= List of Weapon X members =

Weapon X is a fictional Canadian covert operations program appearing in books published by Marvel Comics, usually those featuring X-Men or Wolverine, who is its most notable former member.

The roster consists of two parts. The first part lists the characters in nominal positions of control of the program. The second part lists the characters the program has used either as agents, or as experimental subjects.

== Weapon X staff ==
- Ajax (Francis Freeman) - A cyborg who was empowered and trained at the Weapon X facility. Former enforcer of Dr. Killebrew. Nearly killed in the past by Deadpool but recovered and slaughtered other survivors of Weapon X to track down Deadpool. Apparently killed by Deadpool.
- The Director (Malcolm Colcord) - Scarred by Wolverine, current whereabouts unknown.
- Dr. Abraham Cornelius - A scientist who bound adamantium to Wolverine's bones. He was killed by Wolverine in the "Death of Wolverine" storyline.
- Dr. Duncan - Current whereabouts unknown.
- Dr. Carol Hines - In charge of monitoring and recording the adamantium bonding process, killed by Aldo Ferro.
- Brent Jackson - A former S.H.I.E.L.D. member, defected to Weapon X and eventually became the director, current whereabouts unknown.
- Madison Jeffries - A former member of Alpha Flight, Gamma Flight, and Zodiac, was brainwashed by the Weapon X. Jeffries retained his superhuman powers after M-Day.
- Dr. Emrys Killebrew - A geneticist who mutated many of the subjects, including Deadpool. Former commander of Ajax, who would later kill him.
- Dr. Cecilia Reyes - A member of the X-Men who was forced to work for Weapon X.
- Professor (Thorton) - Directed the bonding of adamantium to Wolverine, who later would cut his hand off. He was killed by Silver Fox.
- John Sublime
- Robert Windsor (Mr. Sinister) - A guise taken by Mister Sinister.
- Dr. Zira
- Dr. Dale Rice - A scientist who is the father of Dr. Zander Rice. He was killed by Wolverine.
- William Stryker - The director of the Weapon X project, Stryker helped create Weapon H.
- Dr. Aliana Alba - A scientist working under William Stryker.
- Romulus
- Cavan Scott / Great Architect - The leader of a Weapon X branch that reconstructed the New U Technologies reanimations created by Ben Reilly.

== Weapon X agents and test subjects ==
- James "Logan" Howlett / Weapon X / Wolverine - Concurrent member of Alpha Flight. Later member of X-Men, Fantastic Four, the Secret Defenders and the New Avengers. The Weapon X project bonded adamantium to his bones.
- Kayla / Silver Fox - She later became an agent of Hydra. Deceased.
- Jack Mead / Jack-in-the-Box - Current whereabouts and status unknown.
- Native - Deceased
- Jeanne-Marie Beaubier / Aurora - Former member of Alpha Flight.
- Jonothon Starsmore / Chamber - A member of Generation X and the X-Men.
- Vanessa Carlysle / Copycat
- Wade Wilson / Deadpool - Mercenary. He later registered with the Initiative.
- John Wraith / Kestrel
- Sarah / Marrow - Former member of the Morlocks, Gene Nation and the X-Men and later, X-Cell and X-Force. She was depowered after M-Day.
- David North / Agent Zero - Depowered after M-Day.
- Mastodon - Currently deceased.
- Vincent / Mesmero
- Pantu Hurageb / Reaper - Former member of the Mutant Liberation Front and X-Cell.
- Victor Creed / Sabretooth - He was later a member of the Marauders, Brotherhood of Mutants, X-Men and X-Factor.
- Dr. Karl Lykos / Sauron - Former member of the Savage Land Mutates and the Brotherhood of Mutants.
- Gregory "Greg" Terraerton / Slayback - Former member of Department K.
- John Lopez / Washout - Deceased
- Garrison Kane / Weapon X - Deceased
- Kyle Gibney / Wild Child - Former member of Gamma Flight, Alpha Flight and X-Factor.
- Richard Gill / Wildside - Former member of the Mutant Liberation Front.
- Laura Kinney / X-23 - A genetic clone of Wolverine. She was a later member of the New X-Men and X-Force.
- X-13 - Current status and whereabouts unknown.
- Noel Higgins / Wildcat - Current status and whereabouts unknown.
- Aldo Ferro / Vole - Current status and whereabouts unknown.
- Worm Cunningham — Mercifully killed by Wade Wilson at the Workshop (a hospice center for Weapon X rejects) after Ajax lobotomized him in retribution for Wilson's actions.
- Jacques — Killed by Ajax after providing information about Deadpool's location.
- Steve — Killed by Ajax along with Jacques.
- Todd — Tortured and then killed by Ajax after providing information about Deadpool.
- Michelle — Sent to the Workshop due to psychosis from her sensory enhancements. Presumed dead by suicide.
- R. Hoek — Sent to the Workshop due to a strength augmentation mishap that increased his muscle density to be point of being unable to move. Presumed dead.
- Mauvais
- H-Alpha - Clayton Cortez was a NAVY Seal who was subjected to the Weapon X Project's experiments and transformed into a gray-skinned Hulk-like creature with Wolverine-like claws and adamantium protrusions on his limbs.
- H-Beta - Robert Andrews was lured into Weapon X's experiments, turning him into a creature similar to H-Alpha. He is beheaded by H-Alpha during a fight with Amadeus Cho.
- X-31 / Gwen Stacy - A reanimation of Gwen Stacy, X-31 was reconstructed by Weapon X following her death and given retractable Adamantium blades and a healing factor.
- X-32 / Gwenlok - The corpse of Gwenpool was stolen from her grave (after she was accidentally killed by X-31) and retrofit by Great Architect's Weapon X branch as a Deathlok cyborg.

== See also ==
- Weapon Plus
