= Weapon X (story arc) =

Marvel Comics storyline

- Cover of Marvel Comics Presents vol. 1, #79 (Mar 1991), art by Barry Windsor-Smith
- Publisher: Marvel Comics
- Publication date: March – September 1991
- Genre: HorrorSuperhero
- Title(s): Marvel Comics Presents #72–84
- Main character(s): Wolverine; Abraham Cornelius; Carol Hines

Creative team
- Writer: Barry Windsor-Smith
- Artist: Barry Windsor-Smith
- Wolverine: Weapon X: ISBN 978-0-7851-3726-9

"Weapon X" is a comic book story arc written and illustrated by Barry Windsor-Smith and published by American company Marvel Comics. The story arc appears in Marvel Comics Presents #72–84 and tells the story of Wolverine during his time in Weapon X. Only the prologue and part of the final chapter are told from the perspective of Wolverine, who is in a near mindless state for the bulk of the story. Instead, three members of the Weapon X team serve as the protagonists: Abraham Cornelius, Carol Hines, and a man referred to within the story as only "the Professor".

Much of the story arc roughly follows the formula of a slasher film, with the protagonists being stalked in an isolated location by a seemingly unstoppable killing machine. It also contains several sequences of intense body horror.

== Plot ==
An aimless, aggressive loner named Logan is captured and prepared for an experimental procedure. A team of scientists led by the Professor and including Abraham Cornelius (disgraced due to performing involuntary euthanasia) and Miss Hines wipe Logan's mind and bond adamantium, the hardest known substance on Earth, to his bones to prepare him to be a mindless killing machine. An excess of adamantium bonds to his forearms for reasons the team cannot determine, resulting in three retractable adamantium claws emerging from his hands. The Professor, consulting privately with the director of the Weapon X program, appears to have anticipated this, and coaxes a naïve young orderly to enter the experiment booth and tend to the blood spurting from the claw exit points. Logan murders the orderly, which the Professor regards as a satisfactory demonstration of his abilities. Discussing the incident afterwards, he feigns ignorance of why the orderly entered the booth.

The team installs silicon sheathes around the claws to prevent sepsis and silicon bushings through which the claws emerged from his body, and surgical alterations to connect his musculature and nervous system to the claws to provide sensation and control. Cornelius designs devices so that Logan's consciousness is under their direct control. Throughout the program, Logan is constantly referred to not as a person but as a subject, and his humanity is almost completely disregarded in the course of the experiments.

In what is ultimately revealed to be a hallucinatory scenario created by the scientists as a climactic test of Logan's abilities, the unseen director takes control of Logan and sends him amok throughout the facility, killing all of the staff, including the Professor, Cornelius, and Hines, as part of "clearing the dead wood". Except for the Professor himself, the team continues to believe the Professor is the head of the Weapon X project, and assume the mysterious director is a fiction which the Professor added to the hallucinatory scenario.

As the team discusses the outcome of the scenario, Logan breaks free for real, and cuts his way into the control room to confront the Professor, Cornelius, and Hines. The story then cuts to Logan escaping into the wilderness, the devices used to control him removed, while Cornelius and Hines comment regretfully on how the Weapon X project turned a man into a monster. The Professor's fate is left unrevealed.

== Background and creation ==
The Weapon X program was first referred to in The Incredible Hulk #180 (October 1974), Wolverine's first appearance. The impetus for the "Weapon X" story, however, was when the editor of Marvel Comics Presents, Terry Kavanagh, asked Barry Windsor-Smith if he would like to illustrate a script he had received for an eight-page story. Windsor-Smith was not interested in the story, but was inspired by Marvel Comics Presents's eight-page story format. He elaborated in an interview published before the first installments of "Weapon X" came out, "I thought it was something rather concise and very testing of one's storytelling abilities: to do an eight-pager and make it sharp and hard rather than these meandering graphic novels."

Days later, Windsor-Smith brought the first several pages of "Weapon X" (Windsor-Smith said it was three installments, i.e. 24 pages, but Kavanagh remembered it being just 5-6 pages) to the Marvel Comics office, shocking Kavanagh since he had not in any way suggested the project, and since Marvel owned the character of Wolverine, if they turned the story down Windsor-Smith would not be able to publish it elsewhere. Windsor-Smith explained, "I don't like to go through this long process of presentations and 'Is it all right if I draw this, please?' I don't care."

Kavanagh liked what he saw of the story and gave Windsor-Smith approval to proceed. As the deadline to print the issue containing the first installment of "Weapon X" approached, Kavanagh was called into the office of Marvel editor-in-chief Tom DeFalco. DeFalco and Marvel's direct sales manager, Carol Kalish, told him that the "Weapon X" pages they had seen were too good for Marvel's newsstand serials, and that they were going to instead publish it as a hardcover graphic novel with higher quality coloring. Kavanagh objected, informing them that Windsor-Smith liked the eight-page format, that Kavanagh had promised him that he could color it himself, and that a few pages had already been colored, but DeFalco and Kalish were not swayed. However, when Kavanagh returned to DeFalco's office some time later and started protesting both the change of venue for "Weapon X" and the mandate that every issue of Marvel Comics Presents have a Wolverine story, DeFalco relented and decided that "Weapon X" would be published in Marvel Comics Presents first, then recolored and printed in graphic novel format.

Though Windsor-Smith has said that he always saw "Weapon X" as simply an entertaining story rather than a significant part of the Wolverine mythos, the serial came under heavy scrutiny from the X-Men editorial and creative staff, who saw it as an origin story for Wolverine and feared that "the Professor" was meant to be Professor X. X-Men editor Bob Harras demanded changes at every step of the production, according to Kavanagh, and after Windsor-Smith had written and drawn several installments of "Weapon X", longtime Uncanny X-Men writer Chris Claremont told him that he had always intended for Apocalypse to be responsible for Wolverine's adamantium. As a courtesy to Claremont, Windsor-Smith added in the unseen director so that Claremont would still have the option to reveal him as Apocalypse, even though he felt it hindered the plot.

Windsor-Smith had no plot for the story worked out in advance, only a general concept, preferring to have the developments be unexpected for himself as well as the reader.

== Themes ==
Psychologist Suzana E. Flores has interpreted the storyline as a narrative of the psychology of torture, including the perspective of the victim and the perpetrator of torture, particularly as practiced historically by states, now recognized as a crime against humanity. She argues that the story illustrates Martha Nussbaum's understanding of objectification, including aspects of instrumentality, denial of autonomy, inertness, fungibility, violability, ownership, and denial of subjectivity. Flores particularly compares the behavior of the scientists in the story with the medical professionals of Nazi Germany. Flores also draws the studies of obedience and complicity in torture by Stanley Milgram and Philip Zimbardo.

== Sequel ==
Issue 48 of Wolverine's first ongoing series has a cover plugging itself as "The sequel to Weapon X". The issue, published just a few months after the conclusion of "Weapon X", involves Wolverine making preliminary investigations into his past, and included remakes of three scenes from the "Weapon X" story. It is collected in Wolverine Visionaries: Marc Silvestri, among other Wolverine stories from the era. Wolverine issue 50 goes on to reveal the fate of the Professor at the end of "Weapon X": he survived, but Wolverine cut off his hand, just as he did in the hallucinatory trial.

== Collected editions ==
The story has been collected numerous times, first in a 1993 hardcover (ISBN 0871359464) then a 2007 hardcover (ISBN 0-7851-2667-8) which was reprinted in 2009 as a paperback (ISBN 0-7851-3726-2).

Additionally, the story is one of several others in the Best of Wolverine, Volume 1 hardcover, published in 2004 (ISBN 0-7851-1370-3), and the Wolverine Omnibus, published in 2009 (ISBN 978-0785134770).

== In other media ==
=== Television ===
The Weapon X storyline was adapted in X-Men: The Animated Series. In this version, the Weapon X program was responsible for Wolverine's adamantium implants and memory alterations. The program (directed by Professor Oyama and Dr. Cornelius) captured Logan, Sabretooth, Silver Fox, and Maverick and used a combination of false memory implants and brainwashing techniques in order to turn them into an elite team of mind-controlled assassins. Most of the experiments and training were administered at a secret research compound in Canada. There, Thorton and Cornelius forcibly laced Logan's skeleton with adamantium. Enraged by what was done to him, Logan broke free of his restraints and rampaged his way out of the facility. During the ensuing chaos, Sabretooth, Silver Fox, and Maverick escaped.

=== Film ===
- The Weapon X storyline was adapted in the X-Men film series.
  - In the 2009 film X-Men Origins: Wolverine, Wolverine is thrust into the Weapon X program by Colonel William Stryker as a promise to kill his brother Victor Creed, who had faked the murder of Logan's girlfriend Kayla Silverfox to manipulate him. In the Alkali Lake Weapon X facility, Wolverine's skeleton bonds with adamantium. He then escapes the facility when he overhears that his memory will be erased. Weapon XI was portrayed in the film as a genetically altered Wade Wilson / Deadpool. Weapon XI is referred to by Stryker as a "deadpool" possessing powers extracted from several mutants.
  - The Weapon X program, headed by Stryker, appears in the film X-Men: Apocalypse. Hugh Jackman appears as Weapon X, wearing headgear and costume based on Barry Windsor-Smith's designs from the Marvel Comics Presents #72–84 story arc.
