= Mesmero =

Publication information
- Publisher: Marvel Comics
- First appearance: The X-Men #49 (October 1968)
- Created by: Arnold Drake (writer); Don Heck (artist); Werner Roth (artist)

In-story information
- Alter ego: Vincent (last name unrevealed)
- Species: Human mutant
- Team affiliations: Brotherhood of Mutants; Weapon X Demi-Men
- Notable aliases: William P. Thorton; Mesmero; Junichi
- Abilities: Resistance to mind control; Teleportation via suit; Illusion casting; Hypnotism

Mesmero (Vincent) is a mutant supervillain appearing in American comic books published by Marvel Comics. Created by Arnold Drake, Don Heck, and Werner Roth, the character first appeared in The X-Men #49 (October 1968). He has been a member of Weapon X and the Brotherhood of Mutants at various points in his history.

== Publication history ==
Mesmero debuted in The X-Men #49 (October 1968), created by Arnold Drake, Don Heck, and Werner Roth. He appeared in the 2017 X-Men: Gold series.

== Fictional character biography ==
Mesmero is originally a small-time crook who poses as a stage hypnotist at high society parties. He uses his mutant powers to mesmerize guests into giving him their possessions and then making them forget about them. Mesmero draws the attention of Magneto, who wants him to hypnotize Lorna Dane into believing that she is Magneto's daughter. Mesmero successfully captures Lorna, takes control of a large number of latent mutants, and battles the X-Men. The Magneto who had manipulated Mesmero is later revealed to have been a robotic imposter.

Mesmero later becomes a carnival manager and mentally compels the X-Men to work as performers. The X-Men free themselves from his control. As Mesmero attacks the X-Men, the real Magneto appears. Magneto overpowers Mesmero and renders him unconscious, then strands him in a South American jungle.

Following several further encounters with the X-Men, Mesmero joins Weapon X. Weapon X director Malcolm Colcord enhances his powers, enabling him to control entire crowds of people at once. Mesmero later attempts to use his powers to help his dying mother and make her believe that she is healthy, but she sees through the illusions and temporarily causes him to lose confidence in his powers. Upon learning that Mesmero has lost his powers, Colcord has him imprisoned in Neverland.

Mesmero is among the mutants who lose their powers to the Scarlet Witch in Decimation. Devastated and ruined, Mesmero is forced into poverty. Mesmero finally achieves a personal triumph by forming a relationship with a woman who had saved his life, promising to help her in turn. She places trust in him freely and unconditionally, something he had never managed before without his powers. Mesmero decides to give up evil.

Mesmero eventually returns to villainy and becomes the leader of the Brotherhood of Mutants. In the interim, he regained his powers through unknown means. Mesmero first has the Brotherhood attack the United Nations, where they are thwarted by the X-Men. He then had his Brotherhood kidnap Bill de Blasio, the mayor of New York City. Once his control is broken, Mesmero is arrested and the Brotherhood is dissolved.

== Powers, abilities, and equipment ==
Vincent is a mutant with superhuman hypnotic powers. He has the psionic ability to mentally influence the minds of others via eye contact, especially telepaths. Through a combination of careful planning and skill, he can manipulate their minds, even if they were much more prone to realizing/breaking his machinations than a non-psychic. Mesmero can hypnotize people into doing whatever he wants them to, alter their brains with false personalities or memories, and make his victims see him as a different person. Mesmero was unable to control Magneto due to his helmet negating telepathic attacks.

At one time, Mesmero wore a costume, which allows him to teleport, leaving only an energy blip where he once stood. That feat was only used for escaping Alpha Flight and may have been controlled entirely by the technology of this suit or tied in some way to his mental capabilities.

== Reception ==
Benito Cereno of ComicsAlliance referred to Mesmero as an "oddball favorite villain."

== Other versions ==
=== Exiles ===
Two alternate universe versions of Mesmero appear in Exiles.

- In Earth-653, Mesmero is involved with the Weapon X program before being recruited into the team of the same name, which is a ruthless counterpart of the Exiles. Mesmero is killed shortly after the formation of the team.
- In Earth-127, Mesmero is a member of the Brotherhood of Mutants alongside gender-swapped versions of Magneto, Quicksilver, and Scarlet Witch (known as Scarlet Warlock). Scarlet Warlock previously attempted to cast a spell to transfer Wolverine's adamantium skeleton into Magneto's body, which failed and fused Mesmero, the Brotherhood members, and Wolverine into an entity known as Brother Mutant. Brother Mutant battles the Exiles and is ultimately killed by the combined efforts of a separate alternate universe version of Wolverine, Albert, and Elsie-Dee.

=== Age of Apocalypse ===
In the Age of Apocalypse timeline, Mesmero is part of the Overmind, a "psychic pyramid scheme" consisting of Quentin Quire and other telepaths. Mesmero and the members of Overmind are later killed by the Shadow King.

=== X-Men '92 ===
An alternate universe version of Mesmero appears in X-Men '92 as a member of Magneto's Brotherhood of Mutants.

== In other media ==
- Mesmero makes a non-speaking cameo appearance in the X-Men: The Animated Series episode "Beyond Good and Evil".
- Mesmero appears in X-Men: Evolution, voiced by Ron Halder. This version is a servant of Apocalypse.
- Mesmero appears in Ultimate Spider-Man, voiced by Dwight Schultz. This version possesses additional mind-swapping abilities and can channel his mind control through technology.
