= Blob (Marvel Comics) =

Marvel Comics fictional character

Frederick J. "Fred" Dukes Blob
- The Blob taken from a panel of The X-Men #7 (September 1964). Art by Jack Kirby.

Publication information
- Publisher: Marvel Comics
- First appearance: The X-Men #3 (January 1964)
- Created by: Stan Lee (writer); Jack Kirby (artist)

In-story information
- Full name: Frederick J. "Fred" Dukes
- Species: Human mutant
- Team affiliations: Secret Empire; X-Cell; Brotherhood of Evil Mutants; X-Corps; Factor Three; Freedom Force; Defenders
- Notable aliases: Blob; Freddie Dukes
- Abilities: Superhuman strength, stamina, endurance, durability, and mass; Personal gravity field

The Blob (Frederick J. "Fred" Dukes) is a fictional character appearing in American comic books published by Marvel Comics. The character was created by Stan Lee and Jack Kirby and first appeared in X-Men #3 (January 1964). A mutant originally depicted as a morbidly obese circus freak, the Blob claims to be immovable when he so desires. He possesses an extreme amount of pliable body mass, which grants him superhuman strength. Possessing the demeanor of a bully, he mostly uses his powers for petty crime, leading him to clash repeatedly with the X-Men, though he has occasionally fought other superheroes like Spider-Man. The Blob is also sometimes depicted as a member of supervillain teams like the Brotherhood of Mutants and Freedom Force.

In live action, Fred Dukes appeared in X-Men Origins: Wolverine (2009), portrayed by Kevin Durand. "Giant" Gustav Claude Ouimet had a cameo as the Blob in X-Men: Apocalypse (2016), and Mike Waters had a cameo as the character in Deadpool & Wolverine (2024).

== Publication history ==
Created by writer Stan Lee and artist Jack Kirby, the Blob first appeared in X-Men #3 (January 1964).

== Fictional character biography ==
=== Early years ===
Born in Lubbock, Texas, Fred J. Dukes starts out as a member of a circus sideshow under the name "the Blob". His act was that he could remain stationary when others tried to move him. He is detected and contacted by Charles Xavier via Cyclops, who sees his performance and tells him that he (Dukes) is a mutant, and asks him to join the X-Men. At the X-Mansion, the other X-Men dislike Dukes for his obnoxious attitude. Iceman uses his power against Dukes to create an ice block around his foot, but the Blob easily escapes. The Blob refuses Xavier's invitation, saying he is better than the other X-Men. When Xavier tries erasing his mind of what has transpired, the Blob escapes the X-Mansion despite the efforts of Beast and uses the sewer to get away without being followed. He tells the manager of the carnival he is taking over, then gathers up the other circus members and they attack the Xavier School for Gifted Youngsters, as he plans to get technology from the X-Men and take over the world. Meanwhile, Xavier works on a device which will allow him to erase the memories of many people. The carnival succeeds in defeating the X-Men despite a warning from Angel. They tie up the X-Men and leave them on the lawn. They then enter the X-Mansion to find the Professor and his technology. Xavier telepathically contacts Marvel Girl and tells her to remove her blindfold using her telekinesis, then levitate a knife from a performer's tent to cut through her bonds, after which she frees the other members. Xavier is able to wipe everyone's minds after the carnival is stopped by a wall of ice, and the Blob goes back to the circus.

=== Joining the Brotherhood ===
The mutant Magneto seeks out Blob to recruit him into his Brotherhood of Mutants, restoring his memory through a jarring blow to the head. Blob temporarily accepts the invitation, but leaves when it is revealed that Magneto has no real concern for his safety. After leaving the Brotherhood, Blob joins Factor Three, then the Secret Empire. With the reorganized Brotherhood, the Blob fights Professor X and the Defenders. He remains with the Brotherhood, becoming a special operative of the federal government when the Brotherhood is reformed as the government-sponsored Freedom Force.

After Freedom Force's dissolution, the Blob participates in other versions of the Brotherhood, including one led by Toad and another led by Professor X. He takes over as leader of the latter group when Xavier leaves.

The psychic entity Onslaught recruits Blob, increasing his powers. During this time, the Blob fights the various members of X-Force and is soundly defeated in each encounter. Months later, he joins the new Brotherhood led once again by Mystique, alongside Toad, Sabretooth, and Mastermind. When Exodus recreates the Brotherhood of Mutants, Blob offers to join, but is dismissed by Exodus, who considers him useless. After undergoing therapy with Sean Garrison, Blob attacks the Xavier Institute, though he is defeated by the combined efforts of the New Mutants and the Hellions.

=== Post-M-Day ===
Due to the Scarlet Witch's depowering of 90% of Earth's mutants, the Blob is one of the thousands to lose their power. However, his skin does not shrink to compensate for his loss of mass, leaving him with huge folds of loose skin. The depressed Blob attempts to commit suicide, but his skin folds protect his body and prevent him from dying. Through unknown means, he loses the excess skin and his fortunes turn in his favor. Now known as Freddie Dukes, he has become a weight-loss guru in Japan.

In Uncanny X-Men #16, Fred Dukes is working with Mystique in Genosha and is once again shown as heavily obese and appears to have his powers restored.

Blob was later seen on Krakoa. He and Anole become the co-owners and bartenders of the tiki bar Green Lagoon.

== Powers and abilities ==
The Blob's mutant physiology grants him a number of advantages. He had superhuman strength, endurance, and great resistance to physical injury. The Blob's elastic, blubbery skin is difficult to penetrate by gunfire, missiles, and even Wolverine's claws, though with sufficient force and a favorable angle, the claws can lacerate his flesh. On one occasion, a concentrated optic blast fired by Cyclops was sufficient to puncture a hole through his shoulder, much to the shock of Dukes himself. The magic swords of both Black Raazer and the Arabian Knight were able to harm him.

He could also alter his personal mono-directional gravity field beneath himself to make himself virtually immovable as long as he was in contact with the ground, although an incredible force can uproot him, along with a chunk of whatever he is standing on. The only beings on record to have been able to move the Blob against his wishes are the Hulk, Juggernaut, and Strong Guy (powered up near his limit by absorbing kinetic energy), although Colossus has managed to lift Dukes by digging underground and raising the piece of earth Dukes stands on, stating this as an exception to his immovability. Magneto once was able to move the Blob by lifting the ground under the Blob's feet via metal pipes. Despite his appearance, the Blob's speed and agility are those of a fairly athletic male of normal stature, a fact which frequently catches his opponents by surprise.

The Blob's superhuman strength greatly increased over the years, in a manner similar to that of the Thing. This improvement is said to be a result of his ongoing mutation.

The Blob is vulnerable to attacks directed at his face, as his eyes, nose, mouth, and ears do not have the same protection as the rest of his body. Dukes is also susceptible to psionic attacks and psychic manipulation, and he can be incapacitated by sensory assaults; for example, Banshee was able to render Blob unconscious solely through the use of his sonic scream. On another occasion, Sleepwalker defeated the Blob by using his warp beams to wrap a steel girder around the villain, crushing his blubber and causing him great physical pain. The Hulk once took the opposite approach, harming the Blob by grabbing and stretching his flab. While he is all but invulnerable to direct kinetic attacks, such as punches, kicks or gunshots, he is susceptible to concussions and other harm resulting from sufficiently powerful impacts, as Daredevil knocked him out by luring him underneath a massive bell and then having it dropped on him with the aid of a young female mutant.

Dukes can be incapacitated by drinking alcohol, although due to his immense mass, a large amount of alcohol is required.

== Reception ==
- In 2018, CBR.com ranked Blob 9th in their "Age Of Apocalypse: The 30 Strongest Characters In Marvel's Coolest Alternate World" list.

== Other versions ==
=== Age of Apocalypse ===
An alternate universe version of Blob appears in Age of Apocalypse. He is initially introduced as a test subject of Hank McCoy, who experiments on him in a violation of the Kelly Pact that Apocalypse signed to keep the Human High Council occupied. After escaping, Blob goes on to join Mister Sinister's Sinister Six as well as Weapon X's Black Legion. Through unspecified means, Blob had his powers altered in a manner that allows him to project his gravitational field outward.

In the "Final Execution Saga" story line in Uncanny X-Force, Blob appears as a member of the Brotherhood of Mutants led by Daken with the aim of taking down X-Force and turning Evan Sabahnur into a new Apocalypse. Nightcrawler kills Blob by teleporting a live shark into his stomach, causing him to be devoured from within.

=== Age of X-Man ===
In the alternate universe created by Nate Grey in Age of X-Man, Blob is the leader of the X-Tremists. This version of Fred Dukes is a dramatic departure from previous representations; he is "soft-hearted, bookish, kind and gentle". Blob has romantic feelings for his teammate Betsy Braddock. According to X-Tremists writer Leah Williams, "My hope in removing the villainy aspects of his character for X-tremists was to make people confront how they feel about fatness in general by utilizing an intriguing aspect of AoX: there is no bodily prejudice."

=== Amazing Spider-Man: Renew Your Vows ===
An alternate universe version of Blob appears in The Amazing Spider-Man: Renew Your Vows as a member of the Brotherhood of Mutants.

=== Cable & Deadpool ===
Deadpool's search for Cable across alternate timelines forces an encounter with the Blob of "an age of Apocalypse" (not to be confused with the X-Men story arc of the same name). In this reality, Blob has taken the mantle of Famine, one of the Horsemen of Apocalypse.

=== House of M ===
An alternate universe version of Blob appears in House of M. He is introduced as a prisoner of an internment camp following Bolivar Trask's rise to power before being freed in a raid orchestrated by Magneto. Blob later appears as a member of the Marauders and the Brotherhood, an NYPD strike team.

=== Marvel Noir ===
In the Marvel Noir reality, Eric Magnus is Chief of Detectives and Fred Dukes appears as a member of his Brotherhood, a cabal of bent policemen.

=== Marvel Zombies ===
An alternate universe version of Blob appears in Marvel Zombies. He is introduced being pursued by a horde of zombies and is later transformed into a zombie himself.

=== Planet X ===
In Uncanny Avengers, the Blob is an enforcer on the alternate universe (Earth-13133) when the Apocalypse Twins skew the time lines and create a mutant utopia called "Planet X".

=== Ultimate Marvel ===
The Ultimate Universe version of Blob, real name Franklin Dukes, is a member of the Brotherhood of Mutant Supremacy. In Ultimatum, the Blob is killed by Hank Pym after eating Wasp's corpse.

It is revealed that Blob was Liz Allan's estranged genetic father after she discovers her own mutant abilities and becomes known as Firestar. He had impregnated Liz's mother while working for a circus sideshow. It was also shown that the Blob fathered a son (Theodore "Tubby Teddy" Allan) by an unknown woman. Teddy is in high school and has his father's same bulky appearance and similar abilities. He later joins Quicksilver's new Brotherhood as the second Blob.

== In other media ==
=== Television ===
- The Blob makes a cameo appearance in the Spider-Man and His Amazing Friends episode "The Prison Plot" as a member of the Brotherhood of Evil Mutants.
- The Blob appears in X-Men: Pryde of the X-Men, voiced by Alan Oppenheimer. This version is a member of the Brotherhood of Mutant Terrorists.
- The Blob appears in X-Men: The Animated Series, voiced by Robert Cait. This version is initially a Genoshan slave before joining the Brotherhood of Evil Mutants.
- A teenage incarnation of the Blob appears in X-Men: Evolution, voiced by Michael Dobson. This version is a high school bully and member of the Brotherhood of Bayville who possesses a sensitive side and self-esteem issues. In a flash-forward depicted in the two-part series finale "Ascension", he and the Brotherhood have reformed and joined S.H.I.E.L.D.
- The Blob appears in Wolverine and the X-Men, voiced by Stephen Stanton. This version is a member of the Brotherhood of Mutants.

=== Film ===
- The Blob appears in an early draft for X-Men (2000), written by Andrew Kevin Walker in 1994.
- Fred Dukes appears in X-Men Origins: Wolverine, portrayed by Kevin Durand. This version is initially a muscular soldier and member of Team X before the team disbanded, leading to him developing an eating disorder, becoming overweight, and undergoing boxing training at John Wraith's suggestion. Additionally, he has a lisp and dislikes being called "Blob".
- The Blob makes a cameo appearance in X-Men: Apocalypse, portrayed by wrestler "Giant" Gustav Claude Ouimet. This version is a cage fighter.
- An alternate timeline variant of the Blob appears in Deadpool & Wolverine, portrayed by British wrestler and drummer Mike Waters.

=== Video games ===
- The Blob appears as a recurring boss in X-Men (1992).
- The Blob appears in X-Men: Reign of Apocalypse.
- The Blob appears in X-Men: Mutant Academy 2 via the "Poolside" stage.
- The Blob appears as an unlockable playable character in X-Men: Next Dimension. This version is a member of the Brotherhood of Mutants.
- The Blob appears as a boss in X-Men Legends, voiced by Mark Klastorin. This version is a member of the Brotherhood of Mutants.
- The Blob makes a cameo appearance in X-Men Legends II: Rise of Apocalypse, voiced by Peter Lurie. This version is a member of the Brotherhood of Mutants.
- The Blob appears as a boss in the X-Men Origins: Wolverine film tie-in game, voiced by Gregg Berger.
- The Blob appears as a boss in Marvel: Avengers Alliance. This version is a member of the Brotherhood of Mutants.
- The Blob appears in Marvel Heroes, voiced by Fred Tatasciore.
- The Blob appears in Lego Marvel Super Heroes, voiced again by Stephen Stanton. This version is a member of the Brotherhood of Mutants.
- The Blob appears in Pinball FX 2 via the X-Men table.
- The Blob appears as a playable character in Marvel Puzzle Quest.
- The Blob appears in Marvel Snap.

=== Miscellaneous ===
The Blob appears in Planet X as a holodeck simulation.

=== Merchandise ===
- The Blob received a build-a-figure and a standalone figure in the Marvel Legends line.
- The X-Men: The Animated Series incarnation of the Blob received an action figure.
- The X-Men: Evolution incarnation of the Blob received an action figure.
- The Blob received a figure in a "Deluxe Twin Pack" along with Sabretooth as part of the X-Men Origins: Wolverine tie-in toy line.
