= Weapon X =

Fictional comic book government facility

Weapon X Project

Publication information
- Publisher: Marvel Comics
- First appearance: The Incredible Hulk #180 (October 1974)
- Created by: Len Wein; Herb Trimpe

In-story information
- Base(s): Various
- Member(s): List of Weapon X members

Weapon X is a fictional government genetic research facility project appearing in American comic books published by Marvel Comics. They were conducted by Department K, which turned willing and unwilling beings into living weapons to carry out covert missions like assassination or eliminating potential threats to the government. It was similar to human enhancement experiments in the real world, but it captured mutants and performed experiments on them to enhance their abilities such as superpowers, turning them into weapons. They also mutated baseline humans.

The fictional experiment X, or the brutal adamantium-skeletal bonding process, written by Barry Windsor-Smith in his classic story "Weapon X" (originally published in Marvel Comics Presents #72–84 in 1991), was eventually revealed as part of the "Weapon X Project." Grant Morrison's New X-Men in 2002 further revealed that Weapon X was the tenth of a series of such projects, collectively known as the Weapon Plus Program, and the X in "Weapon X" referred not to the letter X but the Roman numeral for the number 10. The first project, Weapon I, pertained to the Super Soldier project that created Captain America.

== Publication history ==
The Weapon X organization was created by writer Len Wein and artist Herb Trimpe, and first appeared in The Incredible Hulk #180 (October 1974).

== Fictional organization biography ==
=== Original installment ===
Wolverine, the original Weapon X

Weapon X was originally mentioned in the first appearance of Wolverine in The Incredible Hulk #180 (1974). In the 1991 story arc "Weapon X" (originally published in Marvel Comics Presents #72–84 in 1991), the project was designated Experiment X, and it was revealed that it was responsible for brainwashing Wolverine to become an assassin and binding adamantium to his skeleton. Wolverine later escapes from Weapon X, killing Dale Rice and dozens of other members.

The project's original test subjects were the members of Team X, a covert ops CIA team (consisting of Wolverine, Sabretooth, Maverick, Silver Fox, Mastodon, Arthur Barrington, Psi-Borg/Aldo Ferro, Wildcat/Noel Higgins, and Kestrel). Psi-Borg was involved in the creation of the victims' memory implants, in exchange for being given immortality. The test subjects were policed by an adaptive robot enforcer, called Shiva, should any of the agents go rogue.

Agent Zero

Subsequent attempts at recreating the success seen by Weapon X with Wolverine include Native, Kimura, and X-23 (a clone of Wolverine who was designed to hunt down rogue agents). The Weapon X Re-Creation Project, also known as the Facility, is headed by Martin Sutter, Dale Rice's son Zander Rice, and Sarah Kinney. Later creations of the Facility, now under the direction of Dr. Adam Harkins, include Predator X.

=== Second installment ===
At some point, Weapon X branched off from Weapon Plus' control and is solely headed by Canada's Department K. A new generation of agents were created and given healing abilities using Logan's DNA. However, the batch produced many additional failures, which were sent to a facility for dissection to determine the cause of their failures. These rejects are freed by Deadpool when he escapes from the facility.

=== Third installment ===
In Weapon X series number 6, director Malcolm Colcord forms the third version of the Weapon X project, designed to monitor and eliminate mutants. Colcord, once a security guard at Weapon X, suffered severe facial lacerations during an escape attempt by Wolverine. Unlike the previous two installments of Weapon X, the third project was completely U.S.-based and focused not only on the creation of living weapons, but also on the ultimate goal of Colcord: the creation of death camps where mutants are either executed or forced to serve Weapon X. Unbeknownst to all except Sabretooth, Mister Sinister is disguised as Robert Windsor, the head scientist at the Neverland facility. As Windsor, Sinister rescues mutants from Neverland for his own use.

After some time, Brent Jackson takes over as director, during a mutiny by the team in conjunction with an attack by mutants from the Underground. Cable leads this group in a mission to destroy Weapon X. Colcord flees Weapon X with Madison Jeffries, Aurora, Wild Child, Sauron, Agent Zero, Mesmero, Jack-in-the-Box, and the newly recruited Chamber, who is brainwashed into Jackson's service. Following M-Day, Chamber and Mesmero lose their powers. Neverland is shut down and the remaining prisoners are executed.

=== Fourth installment ===
As part of the RessurXion event, a fourth installment of the Weapon X project debuted. During the Weapons of Mutant Destruction storyline, Weapon X is interested in Lady Deathstrike, Warpath, Domino, Wolverine, and Sabretooth for a new experiment. It is shown that Weapon X is turning civilians into cyborgs made of adamantium sent to hunt a specific group of mutants, forcing Old Man Logan to team up with Sabretooth to stop them. Weapon X goes on to create H-Alpha, a mutate with the abilities of Amadeus Cho and Wolverine.

== Series called Weapon X ==
=== Age of Apocalypse series ===
In 1995, Weapon X became the name of the Age of Apocalypse variation of Wolverine's ongoing series (during the "Age of Apocalypse" storyline, each X-Men series was renamed and renumbered for four monthly issues and then reverted to the original name and numbering after the storyline ended).

=== 2002 ongoing series ===
Weapon X is a 28-issue ongoing series published by Marvel from 2002 to 2004, featuring the third installment of Weapon X. It was written by Frank Tieri, who previously wrote the ongoing Wolverine title and had created the group's most recent incarnation in the pages of said book. Sales sagged following the removal of Cable from the book after the first year on orders of Rob Liefeld, who was working on a new X-Force project. Tieri was forced to drop nearly all of his subplots, including the introduction of a mutant concentration camp run by Mister Sinister, and take the book into the controversial direction involving the introduction of X-23, and Wolverine and Sabretooth's quest to find Sublime. The new direction failed to catch on, mainly due to the books' over-exposure of Wolverine and the drastic change in tone of the book. The series was cancelled, with its storylines unresolved.

=== 2005 limited series ===
A limited series Weapon X: Days of Future Now in 2005 was released that resolved all of the dangling storylines and revealed that Wolverine's disfigurement of Weapon X director Malcolm Colcord was the catalyst for the creation of a future similar to the "Days of Future Past" scenario.

=== Wolverine: Weapon X ===
An ongoing series launched in 2009 titled Wolverine: Weapon X. The series was written by Jason Aaron and illustrated by Ron Garney.

=== 2017 ongoing series ===
As part of their RessurXion event, a new ongoing series for Weapon X written by Greg Pak and illustrated by Greg Land was launched along with other new ongoing X-Men titles. This series takes place after the events seen in X-Men Prime when Lady Deathstrike is kidnapped by the new version of Weapon X.

== Other versions ==
=== Exiles ===
Weapon X in the Exiles series

In the series Exiles, Weapon X consists of individuals who were taken from their respective realities to carry out missions for the Timebroker. To return home, they are forced to jump between universes, repairing the broken links in the chain of time. Unlike their more heroic counterparts, the Exiles, Weapon X resorts to any means necessary to attain their goals.

=== Ultimate Marvel ===
An alternate universe iteration of Weapon X appears in the Ultimate Marvel imprint. This version is based on Finland, is headed by John Wraith and Abraham Cornelius, and was sanctioned by S.H.I.E.L.D. sometime before or during the Gulf War to capture mutants and force them to carry out covert missions for the United States government.

=== Ultimate Universe ===
An alternate universe iteration of Weapon X called Directorate X appears in Ultimate Wolverine. This version is run by the Rasputin family.

=== X-Men Noir ===
An alternate universe iteration of Weapon X appears in the Marvel Noir imprint. This version is a German government agency led by Amanda Sefton.

== In other media ==
=== Television ===
- Weapon X appears in X-Men: The Animated Series, consisting of Professor Oyama and Abraham Cornelius.
  - Weapon X appears in the X-Men '97 episode "Weapon X, Lies and DVDs".
- Weapon X appears in X-Men: Evolution.
- Weapon X appears in Wolverine and the X-Men, led by Professor Andre Thorton and Abraham Cornelius.
- Weapon X makes a cameo appearance in The Avengers: Earth's Mightiest Heroes episode "Behold...The Vision!".

=== Film ===
- Weapon X appears in X2, with Colonel William Stryker as a prominent member.
- Weapon X appears in Hulk vs Wolverine, with Professor Andre Thorton as a prominent member.
- Weapon X appears in X-Men Origins: Wolverine.
- A Weapon X facility called the Workshop appears in Deadpool, with Ajax and Angel Dust as prominent members. Though unstated in the film, actors Ed Skrein and Ryan Reynolds revealed to MTV via San Diego Comic-Con 2015 and Screen Junkies via Honest Trailers respectively that the Workshop is part of Weapon X.
- Weapon X appears in X-Men: Apocalypse, with a young Colonel William Stryker as a prominent member.

=== Video games ===
- Weapon X appears in X2: Wolverine's Revenge. This version of the organization runs a maximum security mutant prison called the Void and employs the Shiva virus as a failsafe to control their test subjects further.
- Weapon X appears in a flashback in X-Men Legends.
- Weapon X appears in X-Men Legends II: Rise of Apocalypse.
- Weapon X appears in X-Men: The Official Game.
- Weapon X appears in the X-Men Origins: Wolverine tie-in game, with William Stryker, Abraham Cornelius, and Carol Hines as prominent members.

== Collected editions ==
=== First series ===
Title	Material collected	Publication Date	ISBN
X-Men: The Complete Age of Apocalypse Epic Book 2	Astonishing X-Men (Vol. 1) #1, X-Men: Alpha, Age of Apocalypse: The Chosen, Generation Next #1, X-Calibre #1, Gambit and the X-Ternals #1–2, Weapon X (Vol. 1) #1–2, Amazing X-Men #1–2, Factor X #1–2, and X-Man #1	August 2006	0785122648
X-Men: The Complete Age Of Apocalypse Epic Book 3	Astonishing X-Men (1st series) #2–4, X-Calibre #2–3, Generation Next #2–3, X-Man #2–3, Factor X #3, Amazing X-Men #3, Weapon X (1st series) #3, Gambit & the X-Ternals #3 and X-Universe #1	April 2006	0785120513
X-Men: The Complete Age Of Apocalypse Epic Book 4	X-Calibre #4, Generation Next #4, X-Man #4 & #53–54, Factor X #4, Amazing X-Men #4, Weapon X (1st series) #4, Gambit & the X-Ternals #4, X-Universe #2, X-Men Omega #1, Blink #4 and X-Men Prime #1	November 2006	0785120521

=== Second series ===
Title	Material collected	Publication Date	ISBN
Weapon X, Volume 1: The Draft	Weapon X (Vol. 2) #1–5, Weapon X #1/2, Weapon X: The Draft - Agent Zero, Weapon X: The Draft - Kane, Weapon X: The Draft - Marrow, Weapon X: The Draft - Sauron, Weapon X: The Draft - Wild Child	March 2003	ISBN 978-0785111481
Weapon X, Volume 2: The Underground	Weapon X (Vol. 2) #6–13	November 2003	ISBN 978-0785112532

=== Third series ===
Title	Material collected	Publication Date	ISBN
Weapon X, Volume 1: Weapons of Mutant Destruction Prelude	Weapon X (Vol. 3) #1–4, Totally Awesome Hulk #19	September 5, 2017	Paperback: 978-1302907341
Weapons of Mutant Destruction	Weapon X (Vol. 3) #5–6, Totally Awesome Hulk #20–22, Weapons of Mutant Destruction #1	November 7, 2017	Paperback: 978-1302910853
Weapon X, Volume 2: Search for Weapon H	Weapon X (Vol. 3) #7–11	March 6, 2018	Paperback: 978-1302907358
Weapon X, Volume 3: Modern Warfare	Weapon X (Vol. 3) #12–16	June 26, 2018	Paperback: 978-1302910938
Weapon X, Volume 4: Russian Revolution	Weapon X (Vol. 3) #17–21	November 13, 2018	Paperback: 978-1302912239
Weapon X, Volume 5: Weapon X-Force	Weapon X (Vol. 3) #22–27	January 30, 2019	Paperback: 978-1302912246
