= David North (character) =

Mutant comic book character

- Agent Zero, on the cover to Weapon X #3. Art by Georges Jeanty.

Publication information
- Publisher: Marvel Comics
- First appearance: X-Men #5 (February 1992)
- Created by: John Byrne (writer); Jim Lee (co-writer/artist)

In-story information
- Alter ego: Christoph Nord
- Species: Human mutant
- Team affiliations: Cell Six; CIA; Weapon X Team X
- Notable aliases: David North; Maverick; Agent Zero
- Abilities: Expert marksman; Advanced hand-to-hand combatant; Espionage mastery; Master tactician; Demolitions specialist; Computer operation; Communications expertise; Former mutant abilities: Kinetic absorption and redistribution; Kinetic energy conversion; Accelerated healing factor; Inodorosity (no discernible scent); Anti-healing factor acid

David North is a character appearing in American comic books published by Marvel Comics. He is primarily known as Maverick and also went by the codename Agent Zero while operating within the Weapon X program. The character first appeared in X-Men #5 (February 1992) and was created by writer John Byrne and co-writer/artist Jim Lee.

A mutant born with the ability to absorb and redirect kinetic energy, David North becomes a professional assassin and mercenary, renowned for his marksmanship skills. His powers were later enhanced by the Weapon X program, granting him an additional healing factor and the ability to secrete a corrosive enzyme that negates other mutants' healing powers.

Daniel Henney portrayed Agent Zero in the 2009 film X-Men Origins: Wolverine.

== Publication history ==
David North first appeared as Maverick in X-Men #5 (February 1992) and was created by John Byrne and Jim Lee. The character later appeared in a self-titled one-shot, Maverick: In the Shadow of Death, and a short-lived ongoing series called Maverick. As Agent Zero, he became a regular in the second Weapon X series.

== Fictional character biography ==
=== Early life ===
Christoph Nord was born in East Germany to American parents. His early history is clouded in mystery, though it is rumored that his parents were involved with the Nazi regime. He also had an older brother named Andreas. (Note: As told in flashbacks in X-Men Unlimited #15 and Maverick #2) A mutant, Nord possesses the ability to absorb kinetic energy through impact with little to no harm.

=== Cell Six ===
A self-described idealist, Nord fought against the communist regime during the height of the Cold War, joining a West German black ops unit named Cell Six. On a mission in Italy, he was injured by a rival assassin codenamed the Confessor. (Note: As told in flashbacks in Maverick #2.)

While recovering, Nord met an Italian nurse, Ginetta Barsalini, with whom he fell in love and married. Over the next three years, Cell Six's field agents were eliminated individually, except for Nord. Nord realized Barsalini was a spy. Threatening to shoot her, he demanded to know her employer. Saying he did not have the will to shoot a defenseless woman in cold blood, she lunged at him with a knife, causing him to shoot her in self-defense. Dying, she revealed that in killing her, he also killed their unborn child. Long after this incident, Nord continues to be wracked with guilt about the betrayal and still seeks answers as to whom Barsalini was working for. This watershed moment left Nord cold and distrusting of everyone, especially women.

=== Weapon X ===
Fueled by the betrayal, Nord became one of Germany's most efficient covert operatives. In the 1960s, his exploits attract the attention of the C.I.A., who offered him a spot in the clandestine Team X. He agrees, and at this time, changes his name to David North. As a part of Team X, North is one of the several mutant operatives the government experimented on and exploited. Each member unknowingly received false memory implants, and North received a slight healing factor culled from Logan's DNA. North's immediate team consists of three field agents: North, Logan (who later became Wolverine), and Victor Creed (who later became Sabretooth). The mutant teleporter John Wraith, also referred to as Kestrel, serves as the team's intelligence man and extractor. At this time, North begins wearing his signature yellow and black faceplate.

On a mission in East Germany, both Creed and Logan are badly injured. Rather than follow protocol and leave them, North brings them to the extraction point. Cornered by Andreas Nord (his brother), now an assassin, North saves his teammates by killing him. Because of this incident, Logan holds North in high regard.

Another mission saw the three agents confront Omega Red in Berlin. They succeed in stealing the carbonadium synthesizer, which Omega Red needs to sustain himself. In the ensuing battle, the synthesizer is thought lost, and a rift forms between Creed and Logan due to Creed's actions on the mission. Unbeknownst to the agency, Logan had recovered the synthesizer and hid it. (Note: As told in flashbacks in X-Men #5 and Wolverine vol. 2 #60.)

By the early 1970s, Team X is summarily disbanded. However, the team's agents are captured by Weapon X to be used as test subjects. After Logan has adamantium bound to his skeleton, he goes on a murderous rampage, allowing North and the others to escape. Around this time, North inexplicably loses his powers. Undaunted, North continues to work in espionage as a mercenary under the name Maverick.

=== Mercenary ===
Maverick contracts the Legacy Virus, which restores his powers, but will eventually kill him. His health declining, he travels the world, using his savings to procure treatment for his infection. In Canada, Maverick encounters former KGB agent and mutant telepath Elena Ivanova, who enlists him to track down Sabretooth. The two are attacked by Omega Red, who had tracked Ivanova in hopes of recovering the carbonadium synthesizer. With the help of John Wraith, they succeed in keeping the device away from Omega Red. Ivanova feels she owes Maverick and accompanies him in his ventures. After North dies from the Legacy Virus, Ivanova uses her powers to resuscitate him.

=== Agent Zero ===
Agent Zero's anti-healing factor in action.

After the Weapon X project is reestablished, Sabretooth and Wraith are sent to recruit Maverick. Maverick refuses to join, and a fierce battle ensues. Sabretooth catches Maverick off guard, impaling him in the chest and then throwing him off the roof of a 20-story building.

Taken to Weapon X near death, North joins Weapon X at the insistence of Malcolm Colcord. He is healed and then upgraded with the explicit intent of assassinating Wolverine, taking the new codename Agent Zero. As Zero, North has no scent, makes no sound thanks to a vibranium suit, possesses an enhanced healing factor, and wields a corrosive that hinders a foe's healing factor. After sending Maverick on a few simple missions, Colcord tries to break his will by sending him to kill Wolverine, which he purposely botches.

During a mission, Agent Zero encounters Chris Bradley, who he had previously met and saved from the Friends of Humanity. Bradley has since taken up the Maverick name himself and infiltrated Gene Nation to destroy them from the inside. Zero, believing this new Maverick was a terrorist, shot and killed him, only to find the truth as Bradley dies.

=== Decimation ===
Agent Zero lost his powers on M-Day as a result of Scarlet Witch's actions during the House of M. Wolverine seeks him out for information on carbonadium, reuniting the two and Jubilee. However, Omega Red soon attacks the building, looking for the carbonadium synthesizer.

Still known as Agent Zero, Nord returns to mercenary work. He is petitioned by an unknown intelligence agency to take down Doctor Doom after Doom was framed for a terrorist attack.

== Powers and abilities ==
North's primary mutant power is the ability to absorb the kinetic energy generated by an impact without harming himself. While this power has limits, North can survive falls from tremendous heights, energy blasts, and strikes by superhumanly strong foes without injury. He can also channel the energy into his physical attacks, increasing the impact force from his punches and kicks to superhuman levels.

Upon accepting his first offer to work for the Weapon X Program, North is artificially granted a slight healing factor that allows him to recover from mild to moderate injuries much faster than an average human. It also renders him immune to most diseases and toxins and greatly suppresses his natural aging process. After contracting the Legacy Virus, his kinetic absorption ability is dramatically reduced in efficiency, and his healing factor burns out while he is fighting the virus.

After being forced to join the Weapon X Program again, North's regenerative aspects were restored, and his kinetic absorption ability was artificially tempered. Now, aside from channeling the energy to increase the strength of his physical attacks and discharge ranged blasts of kinetic energy, North's fingertips carry a corrosive enzyme secreted through the skin that carried over into his force discharges. Aside from its acidic properties, the enzyme is specifically designed by the Weapon X Program to counteract the effects of an opponent's self-healing capabilities by reversing the process. The more an enemy's body attempts to fix and mend itself from injuries sustained, the worse injuries become, thanks to the specialized enzyme. Agent Zero's body now possesses no discernible scent to track as a side effect of the procedure used to grant him this ability.

Currently, North possesses no superhuman powers. Like most of the world's mutant population, North lost his mutant powers following the events of M-Day.

=== Skills and equipment ===
North is a skilled hand-to-hand combatant and covert operative. He is a skilled marksman, experienced in using all types of firearms.

While having worn a variety of uniforms throughout his career, the costume he has worn for most of his mercenary career as Maverick is a suit of body armor consisting of lightweight fiberglass armor plating, a padded kevlar lining, and airtight seals or shields allow him to seal the suit for further protection. His mask contained a limited oxygen supply, infrared scanning, and targeting systems. The suit also harnessed a booster pack that could magnify the kinetic energy his body absorbed. Canadian inventor Isabel Ferguson is the primary source of his specialized gear.

As Agent Zero, North wears a body armor woven from vibranium, rendering him utterly silent as he moves. It also refracts light, which renders it practically invisible to conventional detection methods in total darkness.

North has carried a wide array of weaponry including, but not limited to, thermite bombs, hydraulic bolt guns, titanium bullets, wrist-mounted projectile tasers, wrist-mounted plasma blasters, adamantium bullets, anti-metal bullets, and an adamantium-coated knife.

== Reception ==
- In 2014, Entertainment Weekly ranked Maverick/Agent Zero 39th in their "Let's rank every X-Man ever" list.

== Other versions ==
=== Exiles ===
An alternate universe version of David North / Maverick appears in Exiles. This version is an agent of S.H.I.E.L.D. who was forced to join Weapon X, a group of reality-hopping people who had to kill people to save realities. After Maverick is killed during a mission, his body is trapped in the Timebroker's Crystal Palace until the Exiles return him to his home universe.

=== Earth-5700 ===
In a possible future timeline (Earth-5700), Agent Zero joins a version of the X-Men led by Wolverine. Zero's embedded mental directive, implanted by Weapon X, causes him to kill all of the X-Men except for Wolverine. Unable to bring himself to kill Wolverine, Zero fights off the mind control long enough to commit suicide.

== In other media ==
=== Television ===
Maverick (left) and Silver Fox as they appear in X-Men: The Animated Series.

- Christoph Nord / Maverick appears in X-Men: The Animated Series, voiced by an uncredited actor. This version is a former member of Weapon X who seeks to recover his lost memories.
- Christoph Nord / Maverick appears in Wolverine and the X-Men, voiced by Jim Ward. This version only possesses kinetic energy absorption and is the father of series original character Christy Nord. After being captured, brainwashed, and forced to work for Weapon X's Team X, Maverick is sent to capture Christy until Wolverine and Mystique join forces to stop him. Afterward, Emma Frost restores Maverick's memories, allowing him to reunite with Christy.
- Christoph Nord / Maverick appears in the X-Men '97 episode "Weapon X, Lies and DVDs", voiced by Crispin Freeman. He serves as a member of Team X until he is killed by a Brood-infected Wolverine.

=== Film ===
Daniel Henney as Agent Zero in X-Men Origins: Wolverine.

Agent Zero appears in X-Men Origins: Wolverine, portrayed by Daniel Henney. This version is a ruthless Asian mutant with superhuman reflexes, agility, and accuracy with firearms who serves as a member of Team X and William Stryker's second-in-command. Additionally, producer Lauren Shuler Donner stated on the DVD commentary that Zero has no scent. After most of Team X questions Stryker's morality and leaves the group, Stryker, Zero, and Victor Creed set about killing them for Stryker's experiments. Zero targets Logan, killing an elderly couple who took the latter in, before Logan crashes the helicopter Zero was pursuing him in. With Zero trapped in the destroyed helicopter, Logan interrogates him and sets off an explosion after Zero mocks him, blowing up the helicopter and killing Zero.

=== Video games ===
- Agent Zero appears in the X-Men Origins: Wolverine tie-in game, voiced by Robert Wu. This version's name is David Nord. His role plays out similarly to the film, though Logan kills Zero with his claws following the helicopter crash.
- Maverick appears in Marvel Snap.
