= Omega Red =

Marvel Comics fictional character

Arkady Gregorivich Rossovich Omega Red
- Omega Red taken from a variant cover of Wolverine (vol. 8) #3 (November 2024). Art by Mico Suayan.

Publication information
- Publisher: Marvel Comics
- First appearance: X-Men (vol. 2) #4 (January 1992)
- Created by: John Byrne (writer); Jim Lee (artist)

In-story information
- Alter ego: Arkady Gregorivich Rossovich
- Species: Human mutant
- Team affiliations: The Hand; Red Mafia; Weapon X-Force; The Marauders
- Notable aliases: Arkady Gregorivich; Vasyliev Arkady
- Abilities: Keen intellect; Superhuman strength, stamina, durability, agility, and reflexes; Enhanced healing; Carbonadium coil housed within each arm; Life-force absorption; Poisonous pheromones

Omega Red (Arkady Gregorivich Rossovich) is a supervillain appearing in American comic books published by Marvel Comics, most commonly in association with the X-Men. Created by Jim Lee and John Byrne, the character first appeared in X-Men #4 (vol. 2, January 1992).

Arkady Rossovich is a former Soviet soldier and serial killer, as well as a mutant possessing enhanced healing powers and the ability to secrete deadly pheromones. After being subjected to an experimental procedure by the Soviet government that saw the fictional metal carbonadium being bonded to his body, he gained two retractable coils that extend from his hands and allow him to drain people's "life" energy. This ability became vital for his survival, as his carbonadium implants are highly poisonous and draining life energy on a regular basis is the only way to sustain himself in the absence of the Carbonadium Synthesizer, a device that can be used to stabilize his condition.

The character has been adapted from the comics into several other forms of media, and made his live-action debut through a cameo appearance in Deadpool 2, portrayed by Dakoda Shepley. Additionally, Len Doncheff, Richard Newman, and Colin Murdock have voiced Omega Red in animation. In 2009, Omega Red was ranked by IGN as the 95th Greatest Comic Book Villain of All Time.

== Publication history ==
Omega Red first appeared in X-Men #4 (vol. 2, January 1992), and was created by writer Jim Lee and artist John Byrne.

== Fictional character biography ==
Little is known about Arkady Rossovich's past except that he was a serial killer born in Soviet Russia. He was captured by Interpol agent Sean Cassidy and turned over to the KGB, which wanted to experiment and attempt to create a super-soldier similar to Captain America.

In another version of Omega Red's past, Arkady Rossovich was a Soviet soldier stationed in a small Siberian town. He was a murderer, his crimes easily discoverable due to the town's small size and limited number of potential victims. He was caught by his fellow soldiers and summarily executed via a gunshot to the back of the head. His superiors were astonished when Rossovich survived the execution, and recommended him for the aforementioned Soviet super soldier project, a brutal process; it is suggested that Rossovich survived solely due to his evil and cruel nature. He became an operative for Soviet intelligence and the KGB.

The Soviet government implanted a retractable carbonadium coil within each of Omega Red's arms. Carbonadium was the Soviets' attempt to recreate the artificial alloy known as adamantium, as carbonadium is a more malleable form of adamantium. Omega Red is able to wrap others in his coils to drain them of their "life" energy. This vampiric tendency is essential to Omega Red's survival; the carbonadium implants, while great offensive weapons, slowly poisoned him and he was required to regularly drain life energy to sustain himself. In order to stabilize his condition, Omega Red requires the Carbonadium Synthesizer, a device that was stolen by Wolverine, Maverick, and Sabretooth during their final mission together as Team X in the 1960s.

At some time in the past, the Soviet government decided that Omega Red was too unpredictable and treacherous to be relied upon and placed him in suspended animation until a method could be found to control him. After the fall of the Soviet Union, Omega Red is revived by Matsu'o Tsurayaba, the leader of the Hand. Omega Red became a warrior serving Tsurayaba and was led to believe that Wolverine knew the whereabouts of the Carbonadium Synthesizer which could save his life, and sought him out in an effort to find this device.

After Omega Red is captured by S.H.I.E.L.D., the Red Room buys his freedom with the hopes of using him to their own ends. Wolverine, Colossus, and Nightcrawler encounter him after he has freed himself from his master, however, and they engage in combat. Omega Red is largely impervious to Wolverine's claws; the Red Room had been experimenting on his body in an effort to enhance his healing factor. After Nightcrawler intervenes and knocks Omega Red unconscious, he is returned to S.H.I.E.L.D. custody.

Omega Red is killed after being stabbed in the heart by Wolverine. "The White Sky" organization later arranged for his DNA samples to be used to create the Omega Clan.

The members of the Church of St. Mitrophan later obtain Omega Red's corpse and resurrect him in a mystical ceremony. However, the resurrection is incomplete, leaving Omega Red in danger of dying again until the Russian mafia uses Magik's abilities to restore him.

Arriving bloodied and beaten at Krakoa and seeking asylum, Omega Red is met by Wolverine, who tries to persuade Magneto that Omega Red is too dangerous to be allowed on the island, as he poses too serious a threat to the women and children living there. Investigating his claims of a secret vampire enclave hidden in Paris, Wolverine is captured by Vlad Dracula, who has rejuvenated himself by drinking his blood. As per their agreement, Dracula presents Omega Red with the Carbonadium Synthesizer, warning him that it now contains a detonator. Omega Red will serve as a spy in the service of Dracula to aid against any interference from the mutants towards the Vampire Nation's hidden agenda.

At Wolverine's insistence, Omega Red is restrained by Krakoa and psychically interrogated by Jean Grey, whereupon X-Force discovers that Omega Red has indeed been mesmerized by Dracula to possibly serve as a spy for the Vampire Nation in exchange for the Carbonadium Synthesizer. While Beast discusses with Forge about creating a duplicate Carbonadium Synthesizer containing audio surveillance and homing beacon capabilities, it is revealed that the original detonator has exploded, killing Omega Red. Omega Red is resurrected by the Five, but is left with no memory of his death or rebirth, allowing him to serve X-Force as a double agent in his future dealings with Dracula.

== Powers and abilities ==
Omega Red is a mutant with superhuman strength, stamina, durability, agility, and reflexes, and the ability to secrete pheromones from his body typically referred to as "Death Spores". The spores are fatal to ordinary humans within seconds, though some superhumanly powered beings can withstand exposure to them for extended periods of time.

Implanted within Omega Red's arms are long retractable tendril-like coils made of carbonadium, a durable artificial alloy that is the former Soviet Union's attempt at creating true adamantium. Carbonadium is more malleable than adamantium and, while being vastly stronger than steel, is considerably less durable than adamantium.

Omega Red has the ability to drain the life force of others with his spores, which he can conduct through his coils. Due to the mutant "death factor" and the presence of carbonadium within his body, Omega Red must drain life force to sustain himself.

Omega Red is a highly trained hand-to-hand combatant and military tactician. He was taught various forms of armed and unarmed combat by both the Soviet government and various organizations throughout the Japanese and Russian criminal underworlds. Highly intelligent, he became skilled in the management of criminal organizations.

== Reception ==
In 2018, CBR.com ranked Omega Red 17th in their "Age Of Apocalypse: The 30 Strongest Characters In Marvel's Coolest Alternate World" list.

== Other characters named Omega Red ==
There have been other characters named Omega Red:

=== Warwolf version ===
One of Mojo II's Warwolves posed as Omega Red and joined the other disguised Warwolves in attacking Wolverine. These Warwolves were defeated by Wolverine, Dazzler, Longshot, and the X-Babies.

=== Omega Clan clone ===
As mentioned above, "The White Sky" had arranged for Omega Red's DNA to be used in making the Omega Clan, with one of its members being an Omega Red that came as close to the original.

== Other versions ==
Several alternate universe versions of Omega Red have appeared throughout the character's publication history.

=== Age of Apocalypse ===
In "Age of Apocalypse", Omega Red is a businessman with ties to the mutant underground and the black market. After the death of Apocalypse, Omega Red returns to Russia and builds an army powerful enough to overrun most of Asia and Eastern Europe.

=== Age of Revelation ===
An alternate universe version of Omega Red appears in "Age of Revelation". This version was affected by the X-Virus, causing his powers to harm him. He is recruited into Mister Sinister's group, Sinister's Six. During a raid on an abandoned facility formerly used by Revelation, Omega Red is ambushed and killed by the Angel of Death.

=== Ultimate Marvel ===
In the Ultimate Marvel universe, Omega Red is an enemy of Spider-Man who possesses organic tentacles that emerge from above his wrists.

=== Ultimate Universe ===
An alternate universe version of Omega Red appears in the Ultimate Universe. This version is one of the leaders of the Eurasian Republic until he is killed by Wolverine.

== In other media ==
=== Television ===
- Omega Red appears in X-Men: The Animated Series, voiced by Len Doncheff.
  - Omega Red appears in X-Men '97, voiced by Darin De Paul.
- Omega Red appears in the X-Men: Evolution episode "Target X", voiced by Richard Newman. This version is a Hydra operative and former member of the Weapon X program.
- Omega Red appears in Marvel Anime: Wolverine, voiced by Ryūzaburō Ōtomo in the Japanese version and by JB Blanc in the English dub.
- Omega Red appears in Lego Marvel Avengers: Code Red, voiced by Mick Wingert.
- Omega Red appears in Lego Marvel Avengers: Strange Tails, voiced again by Mick Wingert.

=== Film ===
- Omega Red appears in Hulk Vs, voiced by Colin Murdock. This version is a member of Weapon X's Team X.
- Omega Red makes a cameo appearance in Deadpool 2, portrayed by Dakoda Shepley. This version is a prisoner of a mutant prison called the Ice Box.
- An Omega Red film was in development at 20th Century Fox before it was cancelled amidst the merger between 20th Century Fox and The Walt Disney Company.

=== Video games ===
- Omega Red appears in X-Men: Mutant Apocalypse as a Danger Room simulation.
- Omega Red appears as a playable character in X-Men: Children of the Atom, voiced by George Buza.
- Omega Red appears as a playable character in Marvel Super Heroes vs. Street Fighter, voiced again by Len Doncheff.
- Omega Red appears as a playable character in Marvel vs. Capcom 2: New Age of Heroes, voiced again by Len Doncheff.
- Omega Red appears as a boss in X-Men Legends II: Rise of Apocalypse, voiced by Steve Blum. This version works for Mikhail Rasputin and Apocalypse.
- Omega Red appears as a boss in the Game Boy Advance version of X2: Wolverine's Revenge. Additionally, he was originally set to appear as a boss in the console versions, voiced by Mark Hamill.
- Omega Red and a variant who joined the Horsemen of Apocalypse appear as playable characters in Marvel Puzzle Quest.
- Omega Red and a variant who was empowered by the Phoenix Force appear as playable characters in Marvel Strike Force.
- Omega Red appears in Marvel's Deadpool VR, voiced by Scott Adkins.
- Omega Red appears as the first boss of Marvel's Wolverine, voiced by Raphael Corkhill. This version is a former member of Team X-turned-mercenary and member of the Reavers who holds a grudge against Wolverine after the latter forcefully removed him from Team X when he caught him trying to drain another mutant's life energy.
