= Brent Jackson =

- Brent Jackson; Art by Jay Phillips

Publication information
- Publisher: Marvel Comics
- First appearance: Wolverine (vol. 2) #163 (June 2001)
- Created by: Frank Tieri (writer); Sean Chen (artist)

In-story information
- Alter ego: Brent Montgomery Jackson
- Team affiliations: Weapon X S.H.I.E.L.D.
- Notable aliases: Agent Jackson, Director Jackson

Brent Jackson is a character appearing in American comic books published by Marvel Comics. He first appeared in Wolverine #163 and was created by Frank Tieri and Sean Chen.

== Fictional character biography ==
Brent Jackson initially appears as an agent of S.H.I.E.L.D. who is sent to capture Wolverine after he is framed for the murder of Senator Walsh. Despite Nick Fury's efforts, Jackson succeeds in capturing Wolverine and is revealed to have done so under orders from Malcolm Colcord, director of the Weapon X program.

When Colcord becomes focused on his newfound relationship with Weapon X agent Aurora, Jackson orchestrates a coup, declaring himself the director of Weapon X.

During an argument over Sabretooth's loyalties and criminal behavior, Colcord slaps Jackson. When Jackson tries to attack Colcord in retaliation, he learns that he has an implanted chip that stops him from doing so. Jackson is suspended from Weapon X, but is eventually allowed to return while being observed to prevent further misdemeanors.

== Other versions ==
An elderly Brent Jackson appears in Wolverine: Days of Future Now.
