= Abraham Cornelius =

Fictional character appearing in American comic books

Doctor Cornelius
- Abraham Cornelius as depicted in Death of Wolverine #4 (December 2014). Art by Steve McNiven (penciller), Jay Leisten (inker), and Justin Ponsor (colorist).

Publication information
- Publisher: Marvel Comics
- First appearance: Marvel Comics Presents #73 (March 1991)
- Created by: Barry Windsor-Smith

In-story information
- Alter ego: Dr. Abraham B. Cornelius
- Species: Human
- Team affiliations: Weapon X The Hand
- Partnerships: Matsu'o Tsurayaba; Fenris
- Abilities: Scientific genius

Abraham Cornelius is a character appearing in American comic books published by Marvel Comics. He works as a scientist for Weapon X and was one of the people who played a part in the origin of Wolverine.

== Publication history ==
Cornelius was first mentioned in Barry Windsor-Smith's eight page preview prequel chapter to the original "Weapon X" story arc in Marvel Comics Presents #72. He first fully appeared in Marvel Comics Presents #73 (March 1991).

== Fictional character biography ==
Abraham Cornelius, one of the senior scientists for Weapon X, is employed by Professor Andre Thorton and partnered with Carol Hines. Sometime after World War II, Logan is taken in by the project and Cornelius is assigned with perfecting a technique that bonds the indestructible alloy adamantium to human bone cells. Cornelius uses this to bond Logan's skeleton with adamantium. Logan is later indoctrinated into the Weapon X assassin program.

In the "Death of Wolverine" storyline, Abraham Cornelius resurfaces and places a bounty on Wolverine. Wolverine later tracks down Cornelius. After defeating Cornelius' latest experiment, Wolverine slashes the adamantium container and is covered in adamantium. Wolverine kills Cornelius, but suffocates in the adamantium and dies shortly afterward.

== In other media ==
=== Television ===
- Abraham Cornelius appears in X-Men: The Animated Series, voiced by Dan Hennessey.
  - Abraham Cornelius appears in X-Men '97, voiced by Todd Haberkorn.
- Abraham Cornelius appears in Wolverine and the X-Men, voiced by Jim Ward.

=== Film ===
- Abraham Cornelius makes a non-speaking cameo appearance in Hulk vs Wolverine.
- Abraham Cornelius appears in X-Men Origins: Wolverine, portrayed by David Ritchie.

=== Video games ===
- Abraham Cornelius appears in X2: Wolverine's Revenge, voiced by Don Morrow.
- Abraham Cornelius appears in the X-Men Origins: Wolverine tie-in game, voiced by David Prince.
- Abraham Cornelius appears in Deadpool VR, voiced by Joe Kelly.
