= Kestrel (Marvel Comics) =

Marvel Comic character

John Wraith Kestrel
- John Wraith

Publication information
- Publisher: Marvel Comics
- First appearance: As Carlisle: Wolverine (vol. 2) #48 (November 1991); As John Wraith: Wolverine #60 (September 1992)
- Created by: Larry Hama; Marc Silvestri

In-story information
- Alter ego: John Wraith
- Species: Human mutant
- Team affiliations: Weapon X Team X
- Notable aliases: Carlisle, Halcon
- Abilities: Teleportation; Slowed aging

Kestrel (John Wraith) is a character appearing in American comic books published by Marvel Comics. A mutant possessing teleportation powers, he is depicted as a test subject of Weapon X alongside his former Team X teammates. Since then, he has been used by the Weapon X program and had encounters with his former teammate Wolverine.

will.i.am portrayed the character in the 2009 film X-Men Origins: Wolverine.

== Publication history ==
Kestrel first appeared in Wolverine #48 (November 1991) and was created by writer Larry Hama and artist Marc Silvestri.

== Fictional character biography ==
John Wraith is a member of Team X and later a test subject of the Weapon X program. John possesses the mutant ability to teleport, which allows him to save his teammates from danger. However, he keeps his abilities secret, even from his own teammates. Omega Red and Wolverine eventually learn that John is a mutant after witnessing him teleport during a battle with each other.

Years later, Weapon X member Mastodon dies from rapid aging after his anti-aging mechanism malfunctions. John and the remaining members of Weapon X investigate and discover that they have been listed for termination. Following a battle with Weapon X associate Aldo Ferro, John vanishes.

Wraith is seemingly killed by Sabretooth, who intends to betray Weapon X and no longer trusts him. He is later revealed to have survived and become a preacher. Hellverine, a demon who has possessed Wolverine, attacks Wraith and sets his church on fire. Wraith attempts to stop Hellverine, but is injured and left for dead.

Through unknown means, Wraith later returns from the dead. Sage hires him to get Professor X and the last Krakoan egg to Toybox 27. When Professor X is forced to go on the run, Wraith assists him in getting to safety.

== Powers and abilities ==
Kestrel possesses the mutant ability to teleport over long distances. Additionally, he was given a life-extending serum as part of his initiation into Weapon X.

== Other versions ==
The Ultimate Marvel version of John Wraith is a Caucasian man and the head of the Weapon X program, which specializes in capturing mutants and forcing them to carry out covert missions for the government. He and his men capture and subject James Howlett to experiments which wipe his memories and bond adamantium to his skeleton. They christen Howlett Weapon X and give him the false name Logan. Wraith and his men enjoy tormenting Logan by teasing him with parts of his lost memories and repeatedly shooting him, which he survives due to his healing factor.

When Thunderbolt Ross threatens to phase out Weapon X, Wraith uses Charles Xavier to dispose of Ross with a mental explosion. Later, Wolverine secretly leads the Brotherhood in raiding Weapon X. Wraith is mortally wounded by Nick Fury. Canadian government forces save Wraith's life by injecting him with the Banshee drug, giving him the ability to fly and generate energy blasts. Wraith is made leader of Alpha Flight under the name Vindicator.

During the Ultimatum storyline, Wraith is killed by William Stryker Jr.

== In other media ==
=== Television ===
Colonel Moss of Wolverine and the X-Men is a character partially based on John Wraith's Ultimate Marvel incarnation.

=== Film ===
John Wraith appears in X-Men Origins: Wolverine, portrayed by will.i.am. This version is a member of William Stryker's Team X during the Vietnam War and the only member of the group who James "Logan" Howlett trusts. Initially loyal to the group, Wraith and Logan eventually quit over moral issues, with the former going on to be a boxing manager and helping to get Fred Dukes back into shape. Years later, Wraith accompanies Logan in seeking out Stryker, only to be confronted by Victor Creed who kills him for use in Stryker's experiments.

=== Video games ===
John Wraith appears in X-Men Origins: Wolverine, voiced by will.i.am.
