= X-Men Origins: Wolverine (video game) =

2009 video game

- Cover art used for the Uncaged Edition
- Developer: Raven Software (Note: PlayStation 2 and Wii ports developed by Amaze Entertainment. Nintendo DS and PlayStation Portable versions were developed by Griptonite Games, while EA Mobile developed the mobile version.)
- Publisher: Activision (Note: Electronic Arts published the Mobile version.)
- Writer: Marc Guggenheim
- Composer: Paul Haslinger
- Engine: Unreal Engine 3
- Platforms: Mobile phone; Nintendo DS; PlayStation 2; PlayStation Portable; Wii; Uncaged Edition; PlayStation 3; Windows; Xbox 360
- Release: AU: April 29, 2009; NA/EU: May 1, 2009
- Genres: Action-adventure, hack and slash
- Mode: Single-player

X-Men Origins: Wolverine is a 2009 action-adventure game based on the film of the same name. The game's release coincided with the release of the film on May 1, 2009, for the PlayStation 3, Xbox 360, Windows, Wii, PlayStation 2, Nintendo DS and PlayStation Portable. A version of the game was also released for mobile phones. Raven Software developed the game primarily using Unreal Engine 3. Its ESRB rating has varied widely across platforms, with the non-Nintendo console and PC versions being entitled the Uncaged Edition and receiving a Mature 17+ rating to provide players an opportunity to experience the uncensored graphic violence of the natural use of Wolverine's abilities, the Nintendo DS version receiving an Everyone 10+ rating due to its violence being tamed by reduced resolution and graphics, and the Wii, PlayStation 2 and PlayStation Portable versions receiving a Teen rating by featuring standard superhero violence consistent with what was seen in the PG-13 rated film.

Following the expiration of Activision's licensing deal with Marvel, the game was de-listed and removed from all digital storefronts on January 1, 2014. It was the final Wolverine game published by Activision before the license expired in 2014. It was also the last standalone Wolverine video game to be released until Marvel's Wolverine (2026), developed by Insomniac Games and published by Sony Interactive Entertainment for the PlayStation 5.

== Gameplay ==
Wolverine lunges toward an enemy helicopter.

X-Men Origins: Wolverine takes influences from games such as God of War and Devil May Cry with a third-person perspective. The Uncaged Edition also features a large amount of blood and gore. Enemies can be slain in several ways, and the game also features the graphic display of Wolverine's healing factor.

Combat relies on three options – light attacks, heavy attacks, and grabs. Another attack is the lunge, which lets Wolverine quickly close the distance to an enemy. Wolverine can also use the environment to his advantage, such as impaling foes on spikes. During combat, Wolverine's rage meter builds up, and when full, it lets him use more devastating attacks, like the claw spin and berserker mode, which increases Wolverine's claw strength until his Rage Meter empties. Experience (XP) is collected from defeating enemies, destroying elements and accumulating collectibles. The XP is used to level up, and each new level results in gaining skill points, which are used to purchase upgrades.

The PlayStation 2 and Wii versions are less graphic, with less dialogue and slightly different combat.

== Synopsis ==
The story is a combination of Wolverine's (voiced by Hugh Jackman) backstory explored in the film and an original plot created by Raven Software, which was influenced by major events in the X-Men comic series.

=== Plot ===
In the prologue, set in a bleak urban environment, Wolverine eliminates a group of soldiers sent to kill him. His thoughts drift to a forgotten past.

The game begins in Angola, Africa, chronicling the final mission of Team X, led by Col. William Stryker and his soldiers – James "Logan" Howlett / Wolverine, Logan's brother Victor Creed / Sabretooth, Wade Wilson, John Wraith, and Nord – to locate a village that holds the secret to a valuable mineral deposit (implied to be adamantium). Traveling through the jungle and ancient temples, they encounter and slaughter numerous mercenaries and mutants trying to stop them. When Raven, their CIA liaison, objects to Stryker harming innocent civilians, Stryker orders her termination, and Wraith seemingly kills her. Eventually, Team X locates the village, but the villagers refuse to cooperate, and Stryker threatens their lives. Logan turns on his teammates but is subdued and knocked out before he can prevent the massacre of the villagers.

Three years later, Team X has disbanded. Logan has settled in Canada with his girlfriend, Kayla Silverfox, when Creed surprises Logan at a bar and engages him in battle. Creed emerges victorious, breaks Logan's bone claws, and knocks him unconscious. Logan awakens to find Kayla dead. Stryker arrives and tells Logan Creed is killing his former comrades in revenge for firing him. He offers Logan a chance at revenge, via a procedure to bond the indestructible metal adamantium to his skeleton. Logan accepts, but when the procedure ends, he overhears Stryker ordering his termination. He breaks out of the Alkali Lake facility in a rage, killing many of Stryker's men attempting to stop him, including Nord, and vowing to kill Stryker and Creed.

Searching for Wraith, Logan travels to Project Wideawake, a secret government facility producing mutant-hunting Sentinel robots. There, he meets Raven, who is also searching for Wraith and is revealed to be a mutant shapeshifter; she explains that Wraith helped fake her death three years earlier, and the two have been in a relationship ever since. Raven leads Logan through the facility, where he encounters the Sentinels' mutant-hating inventor, Bolivar Trask. After cutting off Trask's hand to access Wraith's prison with his handprint, Logan rescues Wraith and destroys a large prototype Sentinel.

Wraith leads Logan to Fred Dukes, a former team member who, after Logan bests him in a fight, tells him about "The Island", a prison for mutants captured by Creed on Stryker's behalf. Dukes also reveals the whereabouts of Remy LeBeau, the island's sole mutant escapee, who is currently residing at a casino in New Orleans. Remy flees when Logan questions him, thinking he is one of Stryker's agents, while Creed surprises and kills Wraith. After battling Logan, Remy is convinced he is not with Stryker and takes him to Stryker's island base.

There, Logan confronts Stryker and discovers Kayla is alive and a mutant who seduced Logan with her persuasion ability. Her "death" was an elaborate ruse to trick Logan into volunteering for the Weapon X project to acquire his DNA. Stryker's true plan is to complete Wade's transformation into "Weapon XI", grafting the powers of various mutants (including Wraith and Logan) onto him to create the ultimate mutant-killing super soldier. Devastated by the truth, Logan accepts Stryker's offer to erase his memory, but changes his mind after Creed takes Kayla hostage. Logan fights and defeats Creed, but spares him at Kayla's pleading. While Kayla leaves to rescue her sister, who was captured by Stryker to force her cooperation, Weapon XI is sent to kill Logan. Despite Weapon XI's capabilities, he dies at Logan's hand in the ensuing battle. Creed recovers and amicably parts ways with Logan after reminding him that they are both killers at heart.

Logan finds Kayla wounded and near death; Stryker takes the opportunity to shoot him in the head with an adamantium bullet, erasing all of his memories. Kayla persuades Stryker to walk "until [his] feet bleed", says a tearful goodbye to the unconscious Logan, and drowns herself in a lake. Logan heals from the gunshot and awakens aimlessly and alone.

The epilogue takes place in the same period as the prologue; Trask has taken Logan hostage and replaced his severed hand with a lifelike robotic prosthesis. Logan breaks free of his chains, and Trask flees. As an army of Sentinels ravages a ruined city in the distance, Logan quips, "This world may be broken, but I've got just the tools to fix it."

== Development ==
In May 2009, Raven Software launched a developer blog. Blur Studio, who also worked with Raven on X-Men Legends II: Rise of Apocalypse and Marvel: Ultimate Alliance, provided all of the CGI cutscenes for the game. Hugh Jackman reprised his role as the voice of Wolverine, though he did not provide motion capture. Jackman worked on the project for over a year and "did more voiceover for this than [he had] ever done before." From January to March, the developers published a large number of 3D screenshots. The music for the game was composed by Paul Haslinger. Raven worked with publisher Activision to provide easter eggs from other games to be found, such as the Lich King's sword from World of Warcraft: Wrath of the Lich King and the cake mentioned in the game Portal.

=== Downloadable content ===
In June 2009, Activision released downloadable content for the Xbox 360 and PlayStation 3 versions of the game, featuring a Custom Combat Arena, a Ladder Challenge, and an Environmental Simulator.

== Reception ==
Reception

Aggregate scores
Aggregator	Score
GameRankings	DS: 55% PC: 79% PS3: 75% PSP: 62% Wii: 52% X360: 76%
Metacritic	DS: 55/100; PC: 77/100; PS3: 73/100; PSP: 60/100; Wii: 53/100; X360: 75/100

Review scores
Publication	Score
Destructoid	X360: 7.5/10
Eurogamer	PS3/X360: 5/10
Game Informer	PS3: 8/10
GamePro	X360: 3/5
GameRevolution	B+
GameSpot	PC: 7/10; PS3: 7/10
GameSpy	PS3: 3/5
GameTrailers	7.2/10
GameZone	PC: 8.3/10; PS3: 7.4/10
Giant Bomb	X360: 3/5
IGN	7.8/10 (AU) 6.9/10; DS: 5/10; PS2: 4.5/10; PSP: 5.1/10; Wii: 4.8/10
Nintendo Power	Wii: 5/10
Official Xbox Magazine (US)	X360: 8/10

The Uncaged Edition version received generally positive reviews, whereas other versions of the game attained mostly mixed-to-negative reviews. In general, the level of violence consistent with Wolverine's comic book appearances and the aesthetic value were identified as strong points, but the campaign's short length and lack of replay value, as well as the repetitive nature of the combat, were criticized.

IGN's Greg Miller stated the Uncaged Edition version of the game is an "awesome guilty pleasure", despite criticism of the action's repetitiveness. Miller appreciated the game's cinematic nature, as well as its bloody sights. Overall, IGN gave the visuals a mixed review, stating, "the game looks great sometimes and shoddy other times". Miller also criticized that the only noteworthy sounds are Hugh Jackman's voice and the claws' sound. While the game received an overall 7.8/10 ('good'), the PS2 and Wii versions were rated 4.5 ('bad') and 4.8 ('poor'), respectively. The two ports' shortcomings included, among others, a general lack of music during fights, poor controls, and bad textures.

Review aggregators GameRankings and Metacritic confirmed the different reception across ports. While the PC, PS3, and Xbox 360 versions scored around 75/100 on both aggregators, the Nintendo DS and Wii ports ranked significantly lower, with the PSP port ranked around the middle.

GameSpot gave the game a 7/10, praising the variety of enemies, the brutal action, and the representation of Wolverine's power, yet criticizing the poor replay value and the disappointing boss fights. Overall, the game was defined as "one of the better movie tie-ins released recently". Destructoid's review, which gave the game a 7.5/10, focused on similar points, by finding fault with the boss fights, poor replay value and sloppy plot, and identifying as strong points the quality of the aesthetics and the brutal action.

Eurogamer gave the game a 5/10, stating: "X-Men Origins may be unapologetically violent, but it's also unapologetically repetitive, and it's the one apology that needs to be made". Game Informer, even though criticizing the repetitiveness, stated that "the game is nearly impossible to put down". GamePro stated that "its repetitive gameplay, mundane puzzle design and eye-twitching platforming segments really cuts into Origins' fun and yet, for fans of the franchise, it's a solid title that's worth playing through".

=== Accolades ===
In ScrewAttack's list of "Top 10 Movie-Based Games", the Uncaged Edition of X-Men Origins: Wolverine came in sixth. At the 2009 Spike Video Game Awards, the game won the "Best Cast" award, while Hugh Jackman received the "Best Performance By A Human Male" award for his role as Wolverine. In IGN's list of "Top 5 Favorite Wolverine Games", the Uncaged Edition of X-Men Origins: Wolverine came in first. In GameSpy's "Top 10 Best Superhero PC Games" list, the Uncaged Edition of the game came in tenth.
