= Silver Fox (character) =

Marvel Comics fictional character

Kayla Silver Fox
- by Tom Smith

Publication information
- Publisher: Marvel Comics
- First appearance: Wolverine (vol. 2) #10 (August 1989)
- Created by: Chris Claremont; John Buscema

In-story information
- Alter ego: Kayla Silver Fox
- Species: Human mutant
- Team affiliations: Hydra; Weapon X; Team X
- Notable aliases: Zorra de Plata
- Abilities: Accelerated healing

Kayla Silver Fox is a supervillain appearing in American comic books published by Marvel Comics. She works for the terrorist organization Hydra and is also known as a former love interest for Wolverine.

Lynn Collins portrays Silver Fox in the 2009 film X-Men Origins: Wolverine.

== Publication history ==
Silver Fox first appeared in Wolverine (vol. 2) #10, and was created by Chris Claremont and John Buscema.

== Fictional character biography ==
Silver Fox is a member of the First Nation Blackfoot Confederacy. In the early to late 1900s, she lived with Wolverine as his lover in Canada. She was allegedly murdered by Sabretooth on Wolverine's birthday, but is later revealed to be alive and a member of the covert ops Team X. Fox eventually betrays Team X and becomes a member of Hydra, a subversive terrorist organization.

Silver Fox reappears during the modern period when Wolverine tracks down each member of the Weapon X staff, discovering the studios where many of his memories, which he believes to be real, were staged. Allegedly she kills the professor who had been in charge of the program after Logan left. At this point it is revealed that Silver Fox is in command of a section of Hydra.

Shortly thereafter, Silver Fox captures the assassin Reiko, and forms an alliance with Reiko's boss, Hand Jonin Matsu'o Tsurayaba. Matsu'o is in the process of trying to buy Clan Yashida's underworld connections before Mariko Yashida severs them entirely. Silver Fox dupes Reiko into poisoning Mariko, giving Matsu'o what he wanted. Silver Fox's motivations in this are unclear.

Later, when Mastodon, a member of Weapon X, dies due to the failure of his anti-aging factor, Silver Fox reunites with Logan, Victor Creed, Maverick, and Wraith. She is cold to Logan and seems not to remember having spent any pleasant time with him. The group infiltrates a secret base and confronts the man who had implanted them with their false memories: Aldo Ferro, the Psi-Borg. After Carol Hines dies of fright at the hands of Ferro's transformation, Ferro takes control of their minds and this time makes Creed kill Silver Fox. After Ferro's defeat, Silver Fox was to be buried in Salem Center. At the church, Logan discovered that her body has been prepared for flight. The father at the church notifies Logan that "a brick wall with an eyepatch" gave the order. Suddenly, a S.H.I.E.L.D. carrier arrives with Nick Fury, who states he never imagined the day when a top-ranking Hydra member would get a full honors S.H.I.E.L.D. burial. Wraith appears as well, having orchestrated the entire funeral, stating "Salem Center meant nothing to her". Wraith tells Logan that they found the cabin where he really had lived with Silver Fox a lifetime ago. He gets permission to bury her there and uses the part of the door with "Silver Fox + Logan" in a heart that he had carved into it as a headstone.

Before beheading Sabretooth, Wolverine expresses his doubt on whether or not the events of Silver Fox's return actually happened, but admits the pain and loss he felt during that time was real.

== Powers and abilities ==
Silver Fox possesses an accelerated healing and an age suppressant, allowing her to retain her appearance after years of being separated from Logan.

== In other media ==
Maverick and Silver Fox (right) as depicted in X-Men: The Animated Series.

Lynn Collins as Kayla Silverfox in X-Men Origins: Wolverine.

- Silver Fox appears in the X-Men: The Animated Series episode "Weapon X, Lies and Videotape", voiced by Shannon Lawson.
- Kayla Silverfox appears in X-Men Origins: Wolverine, portrayed by Lynn Collins. This version works as a school teacher, has a sister named Emma, and has a relationship with Logan, having given him his codename "Wolverine" after a Native American legend. Additionally, she possesses tactile manipulation, allowing her to persuade anyone she touches into obeying her. Kayla is later killed while working with Logan to save William Stryker's mutant captives.
- Kayla Silverfox appears in the X-Men Origins: Wolverine tie-in game, voiced by April Stewart.
- Silver Fox appears in the Wolverine Versus Sabretooth motion comic, voiced by Heather Doerksen.
