= Malcolm Colcord =

Director Colcord
- Malcolm Colcord in the cover of Weapon X #6. Art by Keron Grant and Pop Mahn.

Publication information
- Publisher: Marvel Comics
- First appearance: Wolverine vol. 2 #166 (2001)
- Created by: Frank Tieri and Sean Chen

In-story information
- Alter ego: Malcolm Colcord
- Team affiliations: Weapon X
- Notable aliases: The Director

Malcolm Colcord, also known as The Director, is a fictional character appearing in American comic books published by Marvel Comics. The character plays an important role in Weapon X comics and has appeared as a villain in Wolverine.

== Publication history ==
Malcolm Colcord first appeared in Wolverine Vol. 2 #166, and was created by Frank Tieri and Sean Chen.

== Fictional character biography ==
Malcolm Colcord has been depicted as the patriarch of a family and a soldier, until he is assigned as a guard to the Weapon X complex in Canada. One night, Wolverine escapes from the complex, massacring all the soldiers in his way. Colcord does not escape his wrath and gets repeatedly slashed in the face, becoming disfigured for the rest of his life.

After being mutilated, Colcord becomes obsessed with mutants; his wife and children leave him, unable to recognize the man they had once loved. He seizes control of the Weapon X program, becoming the cold, ruthless and calculating Director. He presents to his superiors the idea that mutants are a resource waiting to be exploited, but inside he desires nothing less than the complete extermination of all mutants.

Colcord later falls in love with the mutant Aurora, who persuades him to go through facial surgery to lose his bitterness. Colcord agrees, and for a while the couple lives happily together. Colcord keeps Aurora ignorant of Weapon X's mutant concentration camp, Neverland, and never sends her there during inspections. Brent Jackson points out Colcord's hypocrisy, and slyly calls him a mutant lover. Colcord, troubled by this, angrily beats Aurora. Jackson uses this moment as a chance to usurp control of Weapon X from Colcord.

== Other versions ==
=== Days of Future Now ===
An alternate universe version of Malcolm Colcord from Earth-5700 appears in the miniseries Weapon X: Days of Future Now. He joins the Sentinels in their extermination of mutants and manages to kill the X-Men.

=== Ultimate Marvel ===
An alternate universe version of Malcolm Colcord from Earth-1610 appears in Ultimate Origins as Abraham Cornelius's employer in 1946. Nick Fury later kills Colcord to prevent information about Weapon X from being made public.

=== What If ===
An alternate universe version of Malcolm Colcord from Earth-31340 appears in What If...? Miles Morales #2. This version worked for Weapon X in the 1980s and had his face scarred by Miles Morales. By the 2020s, Colcord becomes the director of S.H.I.E.L.D.

== In other media ==
- Malcolm Colcord appears in The Avengers: Earth's Mightiest Heroes episode "Behold...The Vision!".
- Malcolm Colcord makes a non-speaking appearance in Nemesis' ending in Ultimate Marvel vs. Capcom 3.
