= Team X (comics) =

Fictional comic book group

- Textless cover of Wolverine: Origins #7 (December 2006). Art by Joe Quesada.

Publication information
- Publisher: Marvel Comics
- First appearance: Unnamed: Wolverine #48 (November 1991); As Team X: X-Men #5 (February 1992)
- Created by: Larry Hama; Marc Silvestri

In-story information
- Type of organization: Espionage
- Agent(s): Original version: Victor Creed; Kestrel; Wolverine; Major Arthur Barrington; Mastodon; Maverick; Silver Fox; Vole; Wildcat

Team X is a fictional black ops team appearing in American comic books published by Marvel Comics.

== Publication history ==
Team X first appeared in Wolverine #48 (November 1991) and was created by writer Larry Hama and artist Marc Silvestri. Initially an unnamed black ops group introduced as part of Wolverine's backstory, it was formally identified as Team X in X-Men #5 (February 1992).

== Fictional team history ==
In the Marvel Universe, Team X was a CIA black ops team that operated during the 1960s and was linked to Weapon Plus. It was made up of both mutant and highly skilled human agents, including Wolverine, Sabretooth, Mastodon, Maverick, Major Arthur Barrington, Silver Fox, Wildcat, Vole, and Kestrel.

== In other media ==
=== Television ===
- Team X appears in the X-Men: The Animated Series episode "Weapon X, Lies and Videotape", consisting of Wolverine, Sabretooth, Silver Fox, and Maverick.
- Team X appears in the X-Men '97 episode "Weapon X, Lies and DVDs", consisting of Wolverine, Sabretooth, Maverick, Garrison Kane, Lady Deathstrike, and Morph.
- Team X appears in Wolverine and the X-Men, consisting of Wolverine, Sabretooth, Mystique, and a brainwashed Maverick following Wolverine and Mystique's departure.

=== Film ===
- Team X appears in Hulk vs. Wolverine, consisting of Sabretooth, Deadpool, Lady Deathstrike, and Omega Red.
- Team X appears in X-Men Origins: Wolverine, led by William Stryker and consisting of Logan, Victor Creed, Wade Wilson, Frederick Dukes, John Wraith, Chris Bradley, and Agent Zero. After everyone save for Creed and Zero question Stryker's morality and leave, Stryker, Creed, and Zero set about killing the dissenters and turning Wilson into Weapon XI, with Logan killing Zero.

=== Video games ===
- Team X appears in the X-Men Origins: Wolverine tie-in game, consisting of Logan, Victor Creed, Wade Wilson, Frederick Dukes, John Wraith, and Agent Zero.
- Team X appears in Marvel's Wolverine, led by Nathaniel Essex and consisting of Logan, Raven Darkhölme, and Victor Creed, with Walter Langkowski acting as tech support. Furthermore, Shiro Yoshida and Arkady Rossovich are depicted as former members, having quit the team prior to the game's events.
