= Wolverine (character) =

Marvel Comics superhero

James "Logan" Howlett Wolverine
- Wolverine as seen on the variant cover of Wolverine: Revenge #1 (August 2024). Art by Stanley Lau.

Publication information
- Publisher: Marvel Comics
- First appearance: The Incredible Hulk #180 (October 1974)
- Created by: Len Wein (writer); John Romita Sr. (design); Herb Trimpe (artist)

In-story information
- Alter ego: James "Logan" Howlett
- Species: Human mutant
- Place of origin: Cold Lake, Alberta, Canada
- Team affiliations: X-Men; Avengers; X-Force; Team X; Savage Avengers; Alpha Flight; Canadian Army; New Fantastic Four
- Notable aliases: Logan, Patch, Weapon X
- Abilities: Enhanced strength, speed, agility, reflexes, stamina, durability and senses; Indestructible bones via adamantium; Retractable adamantium claws; Regenerative healing factor; Extended longevity; Master of various forms of combat; Skilled strategist and tactician

Wolverine is a superhero appearing in American comic books published by Marvel Comics. The character first appeared in the comic book The Incredible Hulk #180 (1974) and is best known as a member of the superhero team, the X-Men. Wolverine is the alias of James "Logan" Howlett, a mutant born in Canada in the late 19th century. He possesses a range of superpowers including highly advanced self-healing abilities, a significantly prolonged lifespan, animal-keen senses, and retractable claws. His skeleton is reinforced with the unbreakable fictional metal adamantium, which he acquired after becoming an unwilling test subject in the Weapon X super soldier program. Wolverine is commonly depicted as a gruff loner susceptible to animalistic "berserker rages" who struggles to reconcile his humanity with his wild nature.

Initially portrayed as a Canadian government-sanctioned superhero and a rival of the Hulk, Wolverine was later recruited by Charles Xavier to join his second team of X-Men and has since been one of their key members. Since joining the X-Men, Wolverine has built strong relationships with many of his teammates, being close friends with Nightcrawler, Colossus, and Storm, with whom he also has an on-again, off-again relationship. Wolverine has a complicated but strong friendship with Scott Summers / Cyclops, who he initially views as a rival but has since become one of his most trusted allies on the team. When he first joined the X-Men, Wolverine harbored romantic feelings for Jean Grey, but ultimately chose to reject her out of respect for her and Scott's marriage. Across his life, Wolverine has fathered a son Daken and a daughter X-23, and been a mentor to Kitty Pryde and Jubilee. His archenemy is fellow mutant and Weapon X participant Sabretooth, with whom he shares similar abilities. Alternate iterations of the character have included variations in origin, morality, and sexual orientation.

The character was co-created by writer Len Wein and Marvel art director John Romita Sr., with his first published appearance written by Wein and drawn by artist Herb Trimpe. After joining the X-Men in 1975, the character was significantly developed by writer Chris Claremont, artist Dave Cockrum, and artist-writer John Byrne. He gained greater prominence as a standalone character when artist Frank Miller collaborated with Claremont on a four-issue eponymous limited series in 1982, which debuted the character's catchphrase: "I'm the best there is at what I do, but what I do best isn't very nice." Since 1988, Wolverine has often been featured in ongoing, self-titled series, while also remaining a member of X-Men-related comics. Major Wolverine stories include "Wounded Wolf" (1986), "Weapon X" (1991), "Enemy of the State" (2004–2005), and "Old Man Logan" (2008–2009).

Wolverine quickly emerged as the breakout character of the X-Men, and is among the most popular Marvel Comics characters. His willingness to use deadly force and his brooding loner nature became defining attributes of the many comic book antiheroes that emerged in the aftermath of the Vietnam War. Wolverine's mental health struggles have often been analyzed by academics and psychologists, cited as part of the character's appeal with audiences.

In addition to his comic appearances, Wolverine has been depicted in a wide range of adapted and spin-off media, including television, video games, and film. Wolverine's first major appearance outside of comics was in X-Men: The Animated Series (1992–97), voiced by Cal Dodd, which helped popularize the character among the general public; Dodd reprises his role in the revival series X-Men '97 (2024–present). Actor Hugh Jackman has portrayed the character in ten films, beginning with X-Men (2000) and most recently in Deadpool & Wolverine (2024).

== Publication history ==
=== Creation and development ===
Wolverine made his full debut in The Incredible Hulk #181 (November 1974). Cover art by Herb Trimpe with alterations by John Romita Sr.

Marvel Comics editor-in-chief Roy Thomas wanted to create a Canadian superhero and decided that wolverines were a typical Canadian animal that could inspire such a hero. He asked artist John Romita Sr. and writer Len Wein to devise a character of Canadian origin named Wolverine. Romita designed Wolverine's costume. Wolverine first appeared in the final "teaser" panel of The Incredible Hulk #180 (cover-dated October 1974), written by Wein and penciled by Herb Trimpe. The character then appeared in a number of advertisements in various Marvel Comics publications before making his first major appearance in The Incredible Hulk #181 (November 1974), again by the Wein–Trimpe team. In 2009, Trimpe said he "distinctly remembers" Romita's sketch and that, according to him, Romita and Wein "sewed the monster together [while he] shocked it to life". According to him, Wolverine was initially conceived as a minor character and there were no plans for his continuing popularity. Though sometimes credited as co-creator, Trimpe denied having had any role in Wolverine's creation. The character's introduction was ambiguous, revealing little beyond his being a superhuman agent of the Canadian government. He appears briefly in the following issue's conclusion to the story.

Wolverine's next appearance was in Giant-Size X-Men (May 1975), written by Wein and penciled by Dave Cockrum, in which he is recruited for a new team of X-Men to rescue the original group. Gil Kane illustrated the cover artwork but drew Wolverine's mask with larger headpieces. Cockrum incorporated Kane's alteration into his artwork for the story.

At the time of his initial appearances, basic ideas about Wolverine's abilities and origins remained in development. While some sources indicate that Wein originally intended for Logan to be a mutated wolverine cub evolved to humanoid form by the High Evolutionary, Wein has denied this, suggesting that this may have been Cockrum's idea. In an article about the evolution of Wolverine included in Incredible Hulk and Wolverine (1986), a reprint of The Incredible Hulk #180–181, Cockrum confirmed that he considered having the High Evolutionary play a vital role in making Wolverine a human.

In Wein's original conception, Wolverine was a young adult, and his claws were retractable and part of his gloves, with both made of adamantium. Romita said that he always envisioned the claws as retractable, explaining: "When I make a design, I want it to be practical and functional. I thought, 'If a man has claws like that, how does he scratch his nose or tie his shoelaces?'" Wein recollects that Cockrum first suggested that the claws were installed in Wolverine's forearms. Romita established Wolverine's short stature, deciding that he would be 5 feet, 3 inches (1.6 meters), reflecting the small size of wolverines.

=== 1970s ===
Following Giant-Size X-Men, the X-Men comic was revived with issue #94 (August 1975), drawn by Cockrum and written by Chris Claremont. Wolverine is initially overshadowed by the other characters, although he creates tension in the team as he is attracted to Cyclops' girlfriend, Jean Grey. As the series progressed, Claremont considered dropping Wolverine from the comic; Cockrum's successor, artist John Byrne, championed the character, later explaining that as a Canadian himself he did not want to see the only Canadian character dropped. Byrne modeled his rendition of Wolverine on actor Paul D'Amato, who played Dr. Hook in the sports film Slap Shot (1977). Cockrum introduced another costume for Wolverine in the final issue of his run, but it was dropped at the start of Byrne's run because he found it difficult to draw.

Wolverine was first drawn without his mask in X-Men #98 (April 1976); his distinctive hairstyle became one of his trademarks. The same issue also established that Wolverine's claws are an integrated part of his anatomy. X-Men #100 introduces the "fastball special", a combat maneuver in which the super-strong Colossus throws Wolverine at a distance as if he were a projectile weapon; this tactic recurs in many future battles. Stories of the late 1970s establish Wolverine's murky past and unstable nature, which he battles to keep in check. Wolverine's name was revealed as "Logan" in X-Men #103 (February 1977); Claremont drew inspiration from Canada's Mount Logan, liking "the idea [of] the tallest mountain being the name of the shortest character". Beginning with X-Men #107 (October 1977), Wolverine began wearing a new brown-and-tan costume. X-Men #116 (December 1978) first introduces Wolverine's healing factor, and issue #124 (August 1979) first suggests that he has a reinforced skeleton. The same year, Wolverine appeared in his first solo story, "At the Sign of the Lion", published in the UK in Marvel Comic #335 (March 1979).

=== 1980s ===
In the last years of Byrne's collaboration with Claremont, Wolverine played a pivotal role in "The Dark Phoenix Saga" (January–October 1980) and "Days of Future Past" (January–February 1981) story arcs. In these years, the character primarily wore his brown-and-tan costume. Following Byrne's departure in 1981, Wolverine remained a prominent character in Uncanny X-Men (as X-Men was retitled at this time) throughout the decade. Wolverine's appearance and characterization were influenced by the film roles of Clint Eastwood, particularly the Revisionist Western antihero films featuring the Man with No Name and the 1971 neo-noir detective film Dirty Harry.

The character's growing popularity led to a four-issue solo series, Wolverine (September–December 1982), by Claremont and Frank Miller. Elliott Serrano, a comic writer and commentator, argues that this series was particularly significant in establishing the character's popularity, asserting that "before Claremont and Miller created the Wolverine series, Logan wasn't a key figure, but the creation of this series is when Wolverine became Marvel's Batman." The Claremont and Miller miniseries introduced Wolverine's connection to traditional Japanese culture and his identity as a masterless samurai. The first issue begins with a statement that became Wolverine's catchphrase: "I'm the best there is at what I do but what I do isn't very nice." The mini-series was followed by the six-issue Kitty Pryde and Wolverine by Claremont and Al Milgrom (Nov. 1984 – April 1985).

Barry Windsor-Smith, who had come to prominence illustrating Marvel's Conan the Barbarian series, collaborated with Claremont for the "Wounded Wolf" story that was published as Uncanny X-Men #205 (May 1986), focusing entirely on Wolverine. The story introduced a new adversary for Wolverine, Lady Deathstrike. The "Mutant Massacre" story arc of 1986 brought Sabretooth into conflict with the X-Men and particularly Wolverine. Byrne had previously designed Sabretooth as an enemy of the martial artist superhero Iron Fist in Iron Fist #14 (August 1977), written by Claremont. Sabretooth's face was based on a preliminary and unused drawing Byrne had proposed for Wolverine; he became Wolverine's archenemy. Marvel launched an ongoing Wolverine title written by Claremont with art by John Buscema in November 1988. In the late 1980s, Wolverine featured in self-contained crossover stories with two other characters: Spider-Man, in Spider-Man versus Wolverine (1987), by Christopher Priest and M.D. Bright, and Nick Fury, in Wolverine/Nick Fury: The Scorpio Connection (1989), written by Archie Goodwin with art by Howard Chaykin.

=== 1990s ===
In the early 1990s, Wolverine featured as a prominent character in X-Men vol. 2, initially written by Claremont and illustrated by Jim Lee. The first issue of this series is the highest selling comic book issue in history, selling more than eight million copies. During this period, Wolverine regularly appeared in cover stories for the anthology series Marvel Comics Presents, due to a mandate from Marvel's sales department, which noticed that sales of the series were always higher for issues in which Wolverine was featured. Among these stories was "Weapon X", written and drawn by Windsor-Smith, serialized in issues #72–84 (1991). The story depicts Wolverine's past, how adamantium was grafted to his skeleton, and his experience of extreme psychological and physical trauma. Subsequent Wolverine stories in Marvel Comics Presents were often illustrated by Sam Kieth and had a more psychedelic aesthetic and storytelling style. Wolverine returned to his original blue-and-yellow costume in this period. Wolverine starred in a popular new story arc in X-Men after Claremont's departure, plotted by Byrne and Lee, that revealed more about Wolverine's past and the consequences of the Weapon X program.

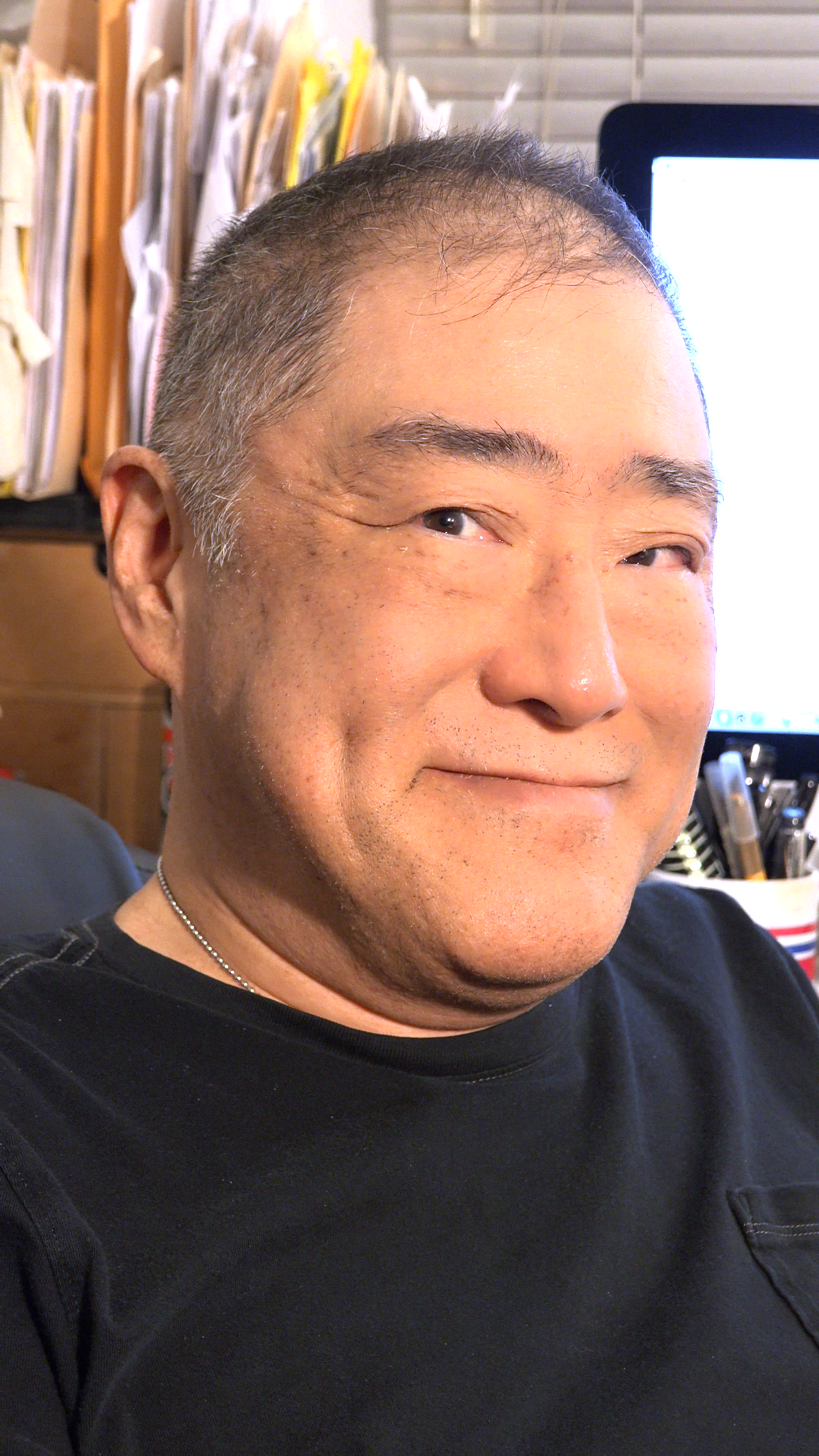
Larry Hama wrote a long run of Wolverine stories in the 1990s.

Larry Hama took over Wolverine's solo series in 1990, and exerted a major influence on how Wolverine was depicted throughout the X-Men family of publications during his run. Hama commented that he "considered the Chris Claremont, Frank Miller, and Barry Windsor-Smith [Wolverine] stories to be canon" and "pretty much ignored everything else." From 1990 to 1992, the series was usually illustrated by Marc Silvestri, who contributed to the character's rising popularity; his work on Wolverine also established him as a star artist in the industry. In issues #48-50 (November 1991-January 1992), Hama delved into Wolverine's mysterious past in the Weapon X program, which was often highly convoluted and unreliable due to the false memories implanted by the program's designers. In 1992, he revisited the Japanese setting and characters of Claremont's and Miller's earlier limited series, ending the story with the poisoning of Mariko Yashida, Logan's lover, and her mercy killing at the hands of Wolverine.

During the Fatal Attractions storyline, in X-Men #25 (October 1993), the adamantium in Wolverine's body is ripped out by Magneto, using his magnetic abilities. Writers Fabian Nicieza and Scott Lobdell were inspired by a suggestion of another Marvel writer, Peter David. The story arc reveals that Wolverine has natural bone claws, in contrast to previously established narrative continuity that his claws were entirely bionic. Wolverine himself is confused by this realization, and his healing factor is also greatly weakened by recovery from this extraordinary injury. At the conclusion of the arc, Wolverine takes a leave of absence from the X-Men.

By the mid-1990s, Wolverine was one of Marvel's most popular characters, rivaling Spider-Man. In 1995, all of the X-Men related comic books were temporarily replaced by a storyline in an alternate reality, named Age of Apocalypse; the Wolverine series was renamed Weapon X. Following the return to the original timeline, a follower of Apocalypse captures Wolverine and attempts to bond adamantium to his skeleton a second time, with the goal of making him one of Apocalypse's warriors. Wolverine's healing factor and willpower reject the process, but the ensuing stress leads him to regress into a bestial state. Stick, the former mentor of Daredevil, sends Elektra to re-train Wolverine, and heal his psyche. For a few issues of his title, Wolverine remains in a bestial state in which he is less articulate and shrewd. Hama left the Wolverine series with issue #118 (November 1997), and Logan's adamantium was restored at the end of the decade in issue #145 (December 1999).

=== 2000s ===
When the Ultimate Marvel imprint was created with reimagined versions of Marvel's characters, an alternate Wolverine appeared in 2001 with the Ultimate X-Men. The series was initially written by Mark Millar, who went on to write a number of other influential stories about Wolverine, in both mainstream continuity and alternate versions.

Sales for X-Men comics declined somewhat at the turn of the 21st century, and Grant Morrison was hired to revive interest in the characters, including Wolverine. This was achieved with the more experimental New X-Men; the re-titling of the ongoing X-Men series for issues #114-156 (May 2001 to March 2004). Frank Quitely and Chris Bachalo drew many of these issues, as well as a returning Silvestri. Origin, a six-issue limited series by co-writers Joe Quesada, Paul Jenkins, and Bill Jemas and artist Andy Kubert (Nov. 2001 – July 2002), expanded on Wolverine's past. This story provided Wolverine's birth name as James Howlett and recounted his previously mysterious childhood and adolescence. Tom DeSanto, a writer and producer for the X-Men film franchise, indicates that Marvel felt the necessity to provide a definitive origin for Wolverine because of his success as a film character and concern that the films would begin to answer these questions if the comic books failed to do so first.

The ongoing Wolverine title ended with issue #189 (2003), and was replaced with a new volume. It was initially written by Greg Rucka and illustrated by Darick Robertson. The following year, after the conclusion of New X-Men, Wolverine featured as a main character in the Astonishing X-Men (2004–2008) series, initially written by Joss Whedon and illustrated by John Cassaday. Millar wrote the "Enemy of the State" storyline, published in Wolverine #20-25 (October 2004–February 2005), in which Wolverine is brainwashed by the ninja secret society the Hand and kills numerous innocent people before returning to consciousness. As in his previous bestial state, Elektra helps him recover his humanity.

In 2005, at the conclusion of the "House of M" storyline, Wolverine regained the memories he had lost or repressed. In the "Decimation" (2006) storyline, 90% of mutants lose their powers; Wolverine is among the 198 mutants who retain them. The same year, a second solo series, Wolverine: Origins, written by Daniel Way with art by Steve Dillon, ran concurrently with the Wolverine title. Wolverine: Origins delved into the ramifications of his newly remembered past and introduced Daken, his son, in issue #11 (April 2007).

In 2007, Jason Aaron became the main writer for the ongoing Wolverine series. The following year, Millar and artist Steve McNiven explored a possible future for Wolverine in an eight-issue story arc entitled "Old Man Logan" that debuted with Wolverine #66 (June 2008). In Uncanny X-Men #493 (February 2008), part of the Messiah Complex storyline, Cyclops asks Wolverine to re-form and lead X-Force. This militaristic sub-team of the X-Men, which initially also included X-23 (Wolverine's daughter), featured in its own ongoing series, written by Craig Kyle and Christopher Yost, from 2008 to 2010. In 2008, Brian K. Vaughan and Eduardo Risso collaborated to produce the Logan miniseries (April–June), which recounted one of Logan's adventures in Japan at the conclusion of World War II.

=== 2010s and 2020s ===
Wolverine joined the Avengers and appeared as a regular character throughout the Avengers (2010–2013) and New Avengers (2010–2013) series, both written by Brian Michael Bendis. Jason Aaron wrote a fourth volume of Wolverine that began in August 2010 and lasted 40 issues. Aaron also wrote a new X-Men storyline, X-Men: Schism (2011), in which Wolverine and Cyclops come into conflict, dividing the team. The same year, he began writing Wolverine and the X-Men, in which Wolverine becomes the headmaster of the Jean Grey School for Higher Learning and must mentor a younger generation of mutants as well as leading one of the X-Men teams. In the Avengers vs. X-Men storyline of 2012, Wolverine sides with the Avengers against his previous team. In 2013, a fifth volume of Wolverine began, written by Paul Cornell and Alan Davis and lasted 13 issues. Cornell then collaborated with Ryan Stegman on Wolverine volume 6 (February 2014 - February 2015). In 2014, Charles Soule wrote the "Death of Wolverine" storyline, in which Wolverine contracts a virus that disables his healing factor, allowing his enemies to finally kill him. He is resurrected in 2018, in the Return of Wolverine miniseries.

2019 saw the beginning of a new era for the X-Men, spearheaded by Jonathan Hickman, starting with the House of X and Powers of X series. This launched the "Krakoan Age", with mutants founding a new nation on the living island of Krakoa, where they are capable of regularly resurrecting mutants after their death. Wolverine continued to appear in a number of series in the 2020s, both as a solo character and as part of multiple teams. During this period, he featured as part of the Savage Avengers (2019–2023), along with Punisher, Elektra, Venom, Brother Voodoo, and Conan the Barbarian. As the "Krakoan Age" continued, Benjamin Percy wrote a new Wolverine ongoing series (vol. 7) beginning in 2020, as well as new X-Force series with Wolverine as leader. In 2022, Percy also wrote a new series titled X Lives of Wolverine and X Deaths of Wolverine, concerning time travel. In Wolverine vol. 7 #50 (May 2024), Logan finally kills Sabretooth.

The "Krakoan Age" concluded in 2024. An eighth volume of Wolverine began the same year, written by Saladin Ahmed and illustrated by Martín Cóccolo and Javier Pina.

== Characterization ==
=== Fictional character biography ===
Wolverine as originally depicted in his debut in The Incredible Hulk #181 (November 1974). Interior art by Herb Trimpe.

James Howlett was born near Cold Lake in Alberta, Canada, during the late 19th century to rich farm owners John and Elizabeth Howlett. However, James was actually the result of an extramarital affair between Elizabeth and the family's groundskeeper Thomas Logan. Thomas was also the father of Dog Logan, James's half-brother. Thomas became increasingly unstable because of his drinking, lost his job, and was expelled from the Howlett manor. He returned to the manor and killed John Howlett. In retaliation, James killed Thomas with bone claws that emerged from the back of his hands, as his mutation manifested. He fled with his childhood companion, Rose, and grew into manhood on a mining colony in Yukon, adopting the name "Logan". When Logan accidentally killed Rose with his claws, he fled the colony and lived in the wilderness among wolves. Logan then resided with the Blackfoot people.

Sabretooth apparently killed Logan's Blackfoot lover, Silver Fox. Logan joined the Canadian military during World War I, and then became a career soldier. During World War II, Logan teamed up with Captain America. He spent time in Madripoor before settling in Japan, where he married a civilian, Itsu. While Logan was away from home, Romulus sent the Winter Soldier to kill the pregnant Itsu and had her baby taken from her womb. While Logan believed his son to be dead, the child was taken and given the name Daken.

Wolverine later worked for the Central Intelligence Agency before being recruited by Team X, a black ops unit. As a member of Team X, Logan was given false memory implants. Eventually breaking free of this mental control, he joined the Canadian Defense Ministry. Logan was subsequently kidnapped by the Weapon X program, where he was held captive and made a subject of experiments; the program fused adamantium onto his bones, before he escaped. James and Heather Hudson helped him recover his humanity following his escape, and Logan began work as an intelligence operative for the Canadian government's Department H.

He becomes Wolverine, one of Canada's first superheroes. In his first mission, he is dispatched to stop the destruction caused by a brawl between the Hulk and the Wendigo. Professor Charles Xavier recruits Wolverine to a new iteration of his superhero-mutant team, the X-Men. He competes with Cyclops for the affection of Jean Grey. While his teammates often distrust him, Wolverine is invaluable in rescuing the others and defeating their enemies, particularly in their conflict with the Hellfire Club; due to their influence, Jean transforms into the Dark Phoenix and apparently sacrifices herself, temporarily ending the love triangle involving her, Wolverine, and Cyclops.

Wolverine becomes engaged to Mariko Yashida, a wealthy businesswoman whose father is head of the Clan Yashida criminal organization, and battles the Hand, a secret society of ninjas. However, she breaks off the engagement, under the influence of a member of the Hellfire Club. He battles Sabretooth, and discovers that he had multiple encounters with him that his traumatic amnesia concealed. During his tenure with the X-Men, Wolverine becomes a mentor for Kitty Pryde and later on Jubilee. Logan again encounters Jean, who has been resurrected and re-joins the X-Men, leading to resumption of Logan's rivalry with Cyclops. He is able to recall some of the trauma he received from the Weapon X program and tries to investigate his past, although his memories remain unreliable because of brainwashing and false memory implants. He meets Maverick, another former participant in the Weapon X project, and discovers that he had previously worked together with Sabretooth in Team X.

During a conflict, the supervillain Magneto forcibly removes the adamantium from Wolverine's skeleton. This massive trauma causes his healing factor to burn out and leads to the discovery that his claws are actually bone. Wolverine leaves the X-Men for a time, embarking on a series of adventures during which his healing factor returns. After his return to the X-Men, Cable's son Genesis kidnaps Wolverine and attempts to re-bond adamantium to his skeleton. This is unsuccessful and causes Wolverine's mutation to accelerate out of control. He degenerates physically and mentally into a more primitive, bestial state. Elektra helps him to recover his humanity. Eventually, the villain Apocalypse captures Wolverine, brainwashes him into becoming the Horseman of Death, and successfully re-bonds adamantium to his skeleton. Wolverine overcomes Apocalypse's programming and returns to the X-Men. Jean becomes possessed by the Phoenix Force once more and Wolverine has no other choice but to kill her with his claws.

Wolverine learns about the existence of X-23. He initially believes her to be a clone, raised to be a perfect assassin. X-23 later goes by the name Laura. She is eventually enrolled at the Xavier Institute. She quickly accepts Wolverine as a father figure, and eventually they learn that he is actually her biological father. Wolverine is brainwashed by the Hand and battles S.H.I.E.L.D., but eventually turns against them with the help of Elektra. After Scarlet Witch drastically transforms reality, Wolverine is able to recall memories of his previous life, overcoming his traumatic amnesia; he discovers that he has a son named Daken, who has been brainwashed and made a living weapon. Cyclops orders Wolverine to reform X-Force.

Wolverine splits from Cyclops and opens a new school in Westchester, New York, the "Jean Grey School for Higher Learning". The Phoenix Force returns to Earth, causing conflict between the X-Men and the Avengers. Wolverine takes the side of the Avengers. Cyclops becomes possessed by the Phoenix Force and kills Professor X. A virus turns off Wolverine's healing factor. He discovers that Doctor Abraham Cornelius, the founder of the Weapon X program, has placed a bounty on his head. Wolverine gets covered in adamantium after confronting him, and dies from suffocation. Laura begins wearing a variation of Wolverine's costume and adopts his codename. Wolverine is eventually resurrected by Persephone, a mutant who can raise the dead. Wolverine is killed again, along with Nightcrawler and others. However, he, along with the other X-Men who have been recently killed, are then resurrected in the Arbor Magus' hatchery on the Pacific island of Krakoa using a new 48 hour cloning process. In this new era, the X-Men have learned how to resurrect any mutant who has died. Wolverine enters into a violent conflict with Beast, who has become aggressive and paranoid in his defense of Krakoa.

=== Personality and mental health ===
Wolverine is a natural-born fighter and one of his key characteristics, according to Claremont, is his struggle to maintain his humanity and reconcile it with his wild, animalistic nature. This theme recurs through various Wolverine stories, such as the period in which he temporarily regresses into a bestial state. He has a tendency to lapse into a "berserker rage" while in close combat, lashing out with the intensity and aggression of an enraged animal.

Despite his apparent ease at taking lives, Wolverine mournfully regrets this and does not enjoy killing. He adheres to a firm code of personal honor and morality, and he generally only responds in a violent or deadly manner to enemies attacking him with deadly force, trying to restrict killing to a "last resort". Claremont has stated that he drew some of Wolverine's characterization from Conan the Barbarian, declaring that "Wolverine in his essence is a lot closer to Conan than any other Marvel hero we have".

Wolverine emulates samurai ethics and practices to control and humanize his violent impulses and abilities; he practices zazen sitting meditation to maintain self-control and restore mental health. J. Andrew Deman argues that while Wolverine is commonly associated with hypermasculinity, at least in Claremont's characterization, he also "consistently demonstrates an emotional intelligence and sense of empathy" to an extremely high degree. Deman acknowledges that Wolverine is a gruff loner who often takes leave from the X-Men to deal with personal issues or problems, irreverent and rebellious towards authority figures, and displays a wry, sarcastic sense of humor. Despite this, Deman also notes that Wolverine is a reliable ally and competent leader, as well as capable of warmth, compassion, and empathy.

Clinical psychologist and Navy veteran Larry Yarbrough recognizes that while "Logan has an extremely reactive temper" he is "also a kind person", pointing out that the "violent/kind demeanor" he displays is typical of combat veterans. According to him, Wolverine's "violent mood swings are a symptom of trauma, not a reflection of his character". He also observes Wolverine's habitual smoking and drinking, which are coping mechanisms for his traumatic experiences. Psychologist Suzana E. Flores writes that Wolverine demonstrates clinical psychological symptoms of post-traumatic stress disorder, bipolar disorder, antisocial personality disorder, dissociative disorder, and even sociopathy, but does so in a way that can be understood and empathized. She interprets his origin story as a depiction of complex childhood trauma, and its effects of dissociative amnesia and hypervigilance. She argues that his first formative trauma was his poor relationship with his mother, who was unable to properly attach to him because she lost her first son. In adulthood, he also suffered the trauma of torture by the Weapon X program.

== Themes and motifs ==
=== Canadian identity ===
Wolverine is the best known Canadian superhero, and one of his nicknames is the "ol' Canucklehead," drawing from a slang term for Canadians. Wolverine's primary connection to Canada is his affinity for the wild outdoors. In civilian clothes, he usually dresses in Western wear characteristic of Saskatchewan and Alberta; Byrne, one of Wolverine's earliest artists, was raised in Alberta. Canadian journalist Paul Jay compared Wolverine to the Canadian rock musician Neil Young. Among Canadians, there is some debate about whether Wolverine really exemplifies Canadian values.

There are numerous stories in which he expresses Canadian patriotism. Vivian Zenari argues that "Wolverine must have national pride, almost out of structural necessity, in order to justify the Canadianness that coalesces around him". Anna F. Peppard notes that Logan's desertion from the Canadian armed forces to join the X-Men in New York reflects a frustration with conformity and bureaucratism in Canadian society.

=== Japanese and samurai culture ===
The essence of [Logan's] character [is] a "failed samurai". To Samurai, duty is all, selfless service the path to their ultimate ambition, death with grace.

— Chris Claremont

Claremont and Miller's Wolverine (1982) introduces the motif that Wolverine emulates samurai ethics and practices to control and humanize his violent impulses and abilities. While he is able to master samurai fighting styles and some norms of behavior, he is not able to fully integrate himself into Japanese society. Comics scholar Jim Davis points out that Claremont took his knowledge of samurai culture from James Clavell's novel Shogun (1975), which takes place in the 16th century; Claremont has confirmed he was inspired by the 1980 TV adaptation.

Davis believes that Claremont's depiction of Japanese society seems fixed in the feudal era, which he indicates is problematic. Academic Eric Sobel argues that Wolverine's samurai proficiency is an example of cultural appropriation and that his Japanese supporting characters are highly stereotyped. However, fellow academic Andrew Deman contests Sobel's argument, particularly his omission of Yukio, who is a complex Japanese character and counterpart to Wolverine. Larry Hama, whose Wolverine stories returned the title character to Japan and acted as a sequel to the Claremont–Miller miniseries, credited the influence of Yakuza films and Ridley Scott's Black Rain (1989) as inspiration. Being a Japanese American, Hama believed that his depiction of Japan was more authentic than previous American superhero stories set in the country. Tsutomu Nihei, a Japanese manga artist, created his own interpretation of Wolverine in the miniseries Wolverine: Snikt! (2003).

=== Masculinity and social bonds ===
Comics scholar Jeffrey K. Johnson argues that Wolverine incarnates cultural values of the Reagan era, emphasizing individualism and retributive justice. Similarly, Neil Shyminsky claims that "Wolverine's appeal is grounded in nostalgia for a morally absolute brand of dangerous masculinity." Gerri Mahn, however, draws attention to the theme of vulnerability in Wolverine's stories, particularly the Fatal Attractions story in which Wolverine is gravely injured by Magneto and loses his adamantium bone lacing. Mahn claims that this experience of recuperation from injury presented an opportunity for Wolverine to redefine his gender identity, establishing more caring bonds with others.

Christopher Michael Roman connects this moment to the continual theme of Wolverine stories in which he cares for a younger person, usually a young woman. While it might seem that Wolverine is learning to be a surrogate father, Roman claims that the kinship bonds are more complicated than a father-child relationship. In his relationship with Kitty Pryde, Roman argues that Wolverine actually teaches her to redefine herself without relying on a father figure, and that their bond is grounded in shared vulnerability. He also draws attention to Wolverine's role as a mentor to other characters like Colossus, Jubilee, Armor, and Quentin Quire.

== Powers and abilities ==
Cover art for Wolverine: Weapon X #1 (June 2009). Art by Ron Garney.

Wolverine's primary mutant power is an accelerated healing process, typically referred to as his mutant "healing factor", that regenerates damaged or destroyed tissues of his body far beyond that of normal humans. In addition to accelerated healing of physical traumas, Wolverine's healing factor makes him extraordinarily resistant to diseases, drugs and toxins. As a result of this ability, Wolverine has the appearance of a man in his early forties, although he is more than 100 years old.

Wolverine's healing factor also affects a number of his physical attributes by increasing them to superhuman levels. His stamina is sufficiently heightened to the point that he can exert himself for hours. Wolverine's agility and reflexes are also enhanced to levels that are beyond the physical limits of the finest human athlete. Due to his healing factor's constant regenerative qualities, he can push his muscles beyond the limits of the human body without injury. Wolverine also has superhuman strength. The Muramasa blade, a katana of mystic origins that can inflict wounds that nullify superhuman healing factors, can suppress Wolverine's powers.

Wolverine's senses of sight, smell, and hearing are super-humanly acute. He can see with perfect clarity at greater distances than an ordinary human, even in near-total darkness. His hearing is enhanced in a similar manner, allowing him to hear sounds ordinary humans cannot and hear across greater distances; he can hear the heartbeats of hostile living beings before conflict begins.

He has three retractable claws made of bone housed within each forearm. Wolverine's hands do not have openings for the claws to move through: they cut through his flesh every time he extrudes them. Due to being subjected through the Weapon X program, Wolverine's entire skeleton, including his claws, has been molecularly infused with the virtually indestructible metal adamantium. While the adamantium in his body prevents or reduces many injuries, such as broken bones and decapitation, his healing factor must work constantly to prevent metal poisoning from killing him. Owing to their adamantium coating, his claws can cut through almost all known solid materials, including most metals, wood, and some varieties of stone. During and after the Return of Wolverine, he showcased a mysterious new ability where the adamantium in his claws can turn red-hot.

During his time in Japan and other countries, Wolverine became proficient in many forms of martial arts, with experience in many different fighting styles. He has trained in jiu-jitsu, judo, karate, escrima, and muay thai. He is proficient in many weapons, although he prefers bladed weapons to firearms.

In contrast to his brutish nature, Wolverine is extremely knowledgeable. In part to his longer lifespan, he has traveled around the world and amassed extensive knowledge of foreign languages and cultures, being fluent or near fluent in Japanese, Russian, Spanish, Cheyenne, and Lakota, among other languages. His fluency in Japanese, in particular, is in large part due to the significant time he spent in Japan and his relationship with Mariko Yashida.

== Supporting characters ==
=== Allies ===
Wolverine is primarily presented as part of the X-Men and has had extensive interactions with all of them and their associates. Nightcrawler is one of his closest friends and was one of the first X-Men to look past Logan's demeanor, which was initially quite abrasive. Wolverine has also teamed up with Gambit on missions separate from the rest of the X-Men. In particular, Wolverine has a complex and ambivalent relationship with Cyclops, with whom he was initially a rival for the affections of Jean Grey.

Logan was one of the original member of Alpha Flight, although he left the group out of frustration with their role as Canadian government operatives. He has also been a member of the Avengers, X-Force, and at times has joined the Fantastic Four. Outside his team allegiances, he has frequently allied with Elektra, particularly during periods when it becomes necessary for him to regain control of his impulses.

=== Romantic interests ===
Rose O'Hara, a close childhood friend, was Logan's first love, although she did not reciprocate his affection. Logan accidentally killed her when she intervened in a fight with his half-brother Dog. Subsequently, Logan had a long relationship with Silver Fox. Logan partnered with a Japanese woman named Itsu, but the relationship was destroyed by enemies and erased from his memory.

Upon joining the X-Men, Wolverine developed a mutual, but unfulfilled attraction to Jean Grey, which often led to arguments with Cyclops, her boyfriend and eventual husband. Later, Wolverine had an intimate relationship with Mariko Yashida and the two of them became engaged, but it was called off. Mariko was eventually poisoned by the Hand and Wolverine had no choice but to mercy kill her to spare her a long agony. Wolverine has had an on-again, off-again romantic relationship with longtime teammate and friend, Storm.

He had a particularly long and complex sporadic relationship with Mystique, which went bad; they have since tried to kill each other. Wolverine had an intimate relationship with Yukio, an assassin initially employed by Clan Yashida who became intrigued by him, and also with his X-Force teammate Domino. He was briefly married to Viper, against his will.

=== Children and mentees ===
Wolverine has a number of children, most notably his daughter, Laura Kinney (X-23), and his son, Akihiro (Daken). A group of his other children, the Mongrels, were used in a plot to torture him by the Red Right Hand. Besides his biological children, Wolverine has also been a mentor and father figure to several younger women, especially Kitty Pryde and Jubilee.

=== Enemies ===
Wolverine was originally introduced as an antagonist of the Hulk. They have fought multiple times, but also occasionally team up against other foes. Wolverine's archenemy is Sabretooth, who shares the same basic powers and abilities with him. Sabretooth is somewhat older than Logan, and was also a participant in the Weapon X program. Wolverine has also frequently battled Lady Deathstrike, a samurai cyborg whose father invented the process of bonding adamantium to bone. In Japan, Wolverine has fought with Silver Samurai, the half-brother of his lover Mariko. Other prominent enemies include the Hellfire Club and Viper.

=== Alternate versions ===
A number of alternate universes and alternate timelines in Marvel Comics publications allow writers to introduce variations on Wolverine, in which the character's origins, behavior, morality, or sexual orientation differ from the mainstream setting. For example, the Wolverine of the alternate future of Days of Future Past is a resistance fighter in a future where Sentinels rule North America. In the Age of Apocalypse story arc, Apocalypse dominates the earth, and Wolverine is missing a hand. In the Age of Apocalypse, Logan has the name Weapon X rather than Wolverine. In this reality, Logan still has his adamantium, but is missing a hand; he and Jean Grey are lovers. In the alternate reality of Ultimate Marvel, Wolverine is initially an agent of Magneto, and is significantly more aggressive and amoral. In X-Treme X-Men, Wolverine is the British Governor General of Canada; he and Hercules are lovers. In the future of Old Man Logan, Wolverine was tricked into killing the other X-Men and subsequently renounced violence. Old Man Logan, created by Millar in 2008, later featured in a miniseries written by Bendis that began in July 2015.

== Reception and legacy ==
Wolverine is one of the most popular Marvel superheroes. In 1995, he tied with Spider-Man as Marvel's most licensed character. In 2008, Wizard magazine ranked Wolverine 1st in their "200 Greatest Comic Book Characters of All Time" list. The same year, Empire ranked Wolverine 4th in their "50 Greatest Comic Book Characters" list. In 2014, Entertainment Weekly ranked Wolverine 1st in their "Let's rank every X-Man ever" list.

Wolverine is typical of the tough antiheroes that emerged in American popular culture after the Vietnam War; his willingness to use deadly force and his brooding loner nature became standard characteristics for comic book antiheroes by the end of the 1980s. Wolverine was considered groundbreaking among comic book superheroes in demonstrating the traits of an antihero, which according to psychologist Suzana E. Flores includes being "psychologically damaged" as well as being "simultaneously depicted as superior due to [their] superhuman abilities and inferior due to [their] impetuousness, irrationality, or lack of thoughtful evaluation." Following Wolverine's creation, antiheroes became increasingly popular in comic books—especially in the 1990s—with the development of ones like the Punisher, Marv, Spawn, and Deadpool.

The illustration of Wolverine's various mental health challenges, particularly recovery from major trauma or psychological trauma, have been identified by Flores as one of the reasons for his popularity. While the character is usually physically invincible, he demonstrates emotional and psychological vulnerability, exemplifying values and aspirations of resilience for his audience. Flores notes that Wolverine's fanbase consists primarily of men and the character generally exemplifies a masculine perspective on recovery from trauma; despite this, she found him therapeutic in her own recovery from rape. Nnedi Okorafor, a Nigerian American science-fiction author, stated that Wolverine was a therapeutic role model for her during her experience of paralysis following surgical treatment of scoliosis.

J. Andrew Deman praises "The Wounded Wolf" story illustrated by Windsor-Smith that appeared in Uncanny X-Men, comparing it to the Iliad. Comic book critics have particularly commended Windsor-Smith's Weapon X story, which describes Wolverine's mistreatment at the hands of the Weapon X program and his experience of trauma. Hagai Palevsky describes it as "quite possibly the best comic Marvel ever published." Rolling Stone journalist Sean T. Collins calls it "Arguably the most important and the most visually impressive Wolverine storyline of all time." In contrast, Paul Young criticizes the trends of the mid-1990s in which Wolverine and other anti-heroes became ubiquitous (he describes this as "Wolverine-mania") and often marketed with gimmick covers. Among later stories, critic Jim Davis considers "Enemy of the State" and "Old Man Logan", both by Millar, to be particularly notable.

The character's healing factor gave its name to the "Wolverine stack", a term used for the combination of the experimental peptides BPC-157 and TB-500.

== In other media ==
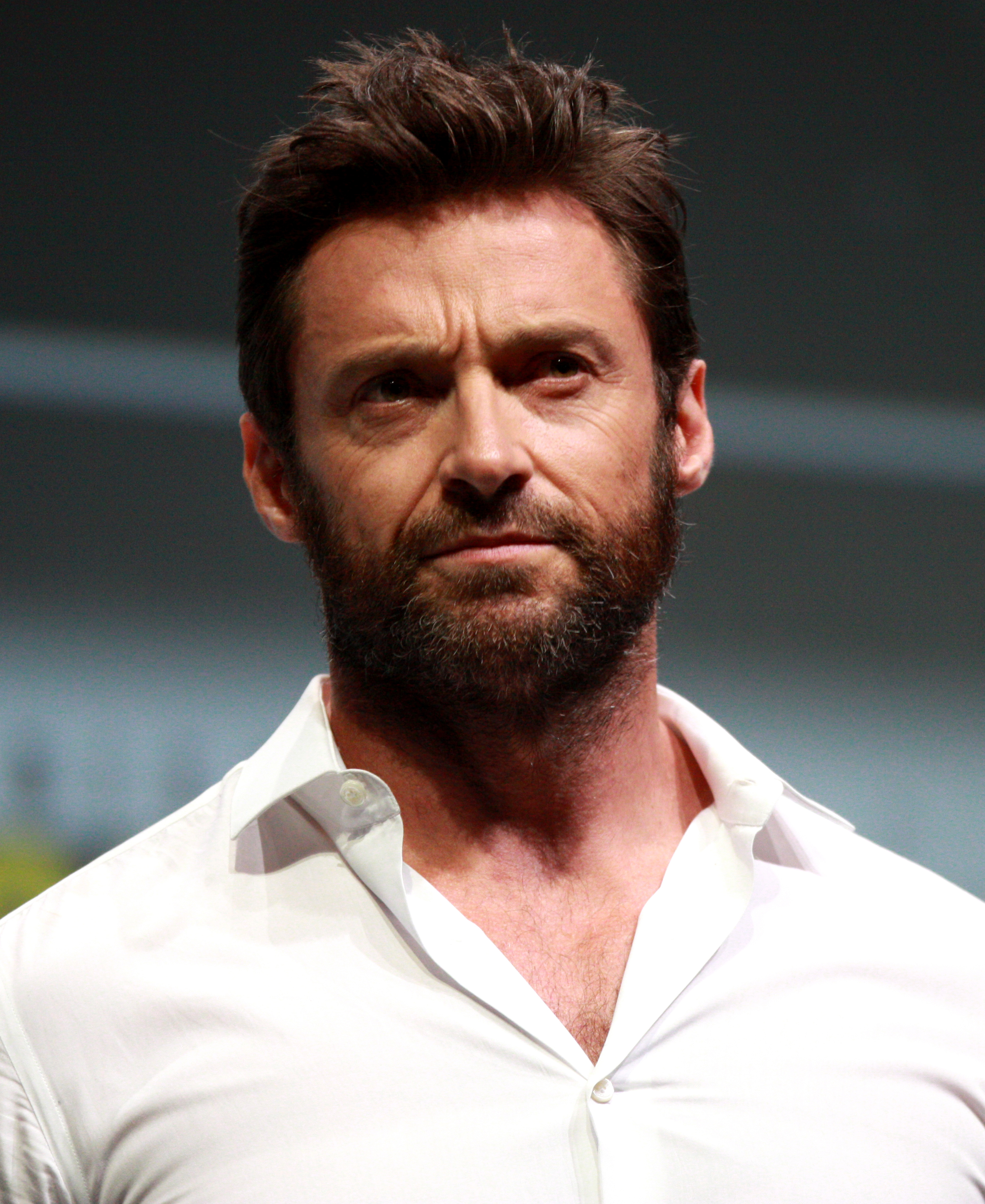
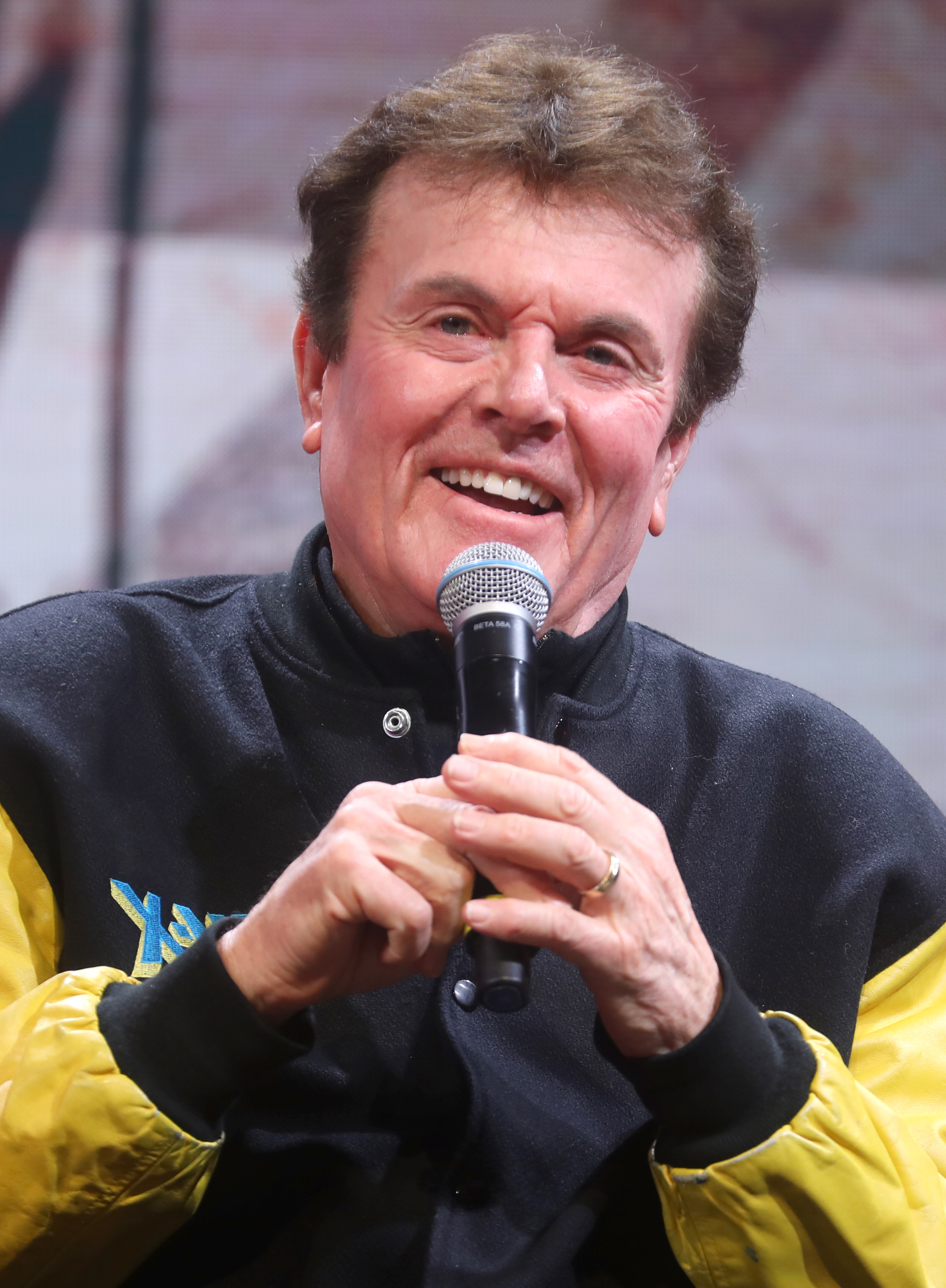
Hugh Jackman (left; pictured 2013) has portrayed Logan in ten films since 2000. Cal Dodd (right; pictured 2024) voiced Wolverine in X-Men: The Animated Series (1992–97), helping popularize the character, and reprises his role in the revival series X-Men '97 (2024–present).

Wolverine is one of the few X-Men characters appearing in nearly every media adaptation of the X-Men franchise, including the 20th Century Fox X-Men films, television, computer and video games. Australian actor Hugh Jackman portrayed Wolverine in the X-Men films, beginning in X-Men (2000). He reprised the role in X2 (2003), X-Men: The Last Stand (2006), X-Men Origins: Wolverine (2009), X-Men: First Class (2011), The Wolverine (2013), X-Men: Days of Future Past (2014), X-Men: Apocalypse (2016), Logan (2017), and Deadpool & Wolverine (2024). Logan received praise from critics, and a nomination for an Academy Award for Best Adapted Screenplay in 2018; it was the first superhero film to be nominated in the category. Deadpool & Wolverine became the highest grossing R-rated film ever made.

Wolverine's first animated appearance was in Spider-Man and His Amazing Friends (1981). He has since been featured in a starring capacity in X-Men: The Animated Series (1992–1997), X-Men: Evolution (2000–2003), Wolverine and the X-Men (2009), Marvel Anime: Wolverine and Marvel Anime: X-Men (both 2011), and X-Men '97 (2024–present). The 1992-97 animated series was particularly significant in introducing Wolverine to a mass popular audience. At its peak, in 1994, it was watched by 23 million households weekly, the highest rated show on Fox Kids. Cal Dodd voices the character in X-Men: The Animated Series and its revival X-Men '97; producers suggested that Dodd base his vocal performance on Clint Eastwood. In Wolverine and the X-Men and the English dub of the Wolverine anime series, Logan was voiced by Steven Blum, who has voiced the characters across more animated films, series, and video games than any other voice actor.

Wolverine has appeared in a variety of Marvel and X-Men video games, and has been the titular lead in six games: Wolverine (1991), Wolverine: Adamantium Rage (1994), X-Men: Wolverine's Rage (2001), the X2 tie-in X2: Wolverine's Revenge (2003), X-Men Origins: Wolverine (2009), a tie-in to the film of the same name, and Marvel's Wolverine (2026), developed by Insomniac Games.
