= Adamantium =

Fictional, indestructible metal alloy

Publication information
- Publisher: Marvel Comics
- First appearance: The Avengers #66 (July 1969)
- Created by: Roy Thomas; Barry Windsor-Smith; Syd Shores

In story information
- Type: Metal
- Element of stories featuring: Wolverine, Ultron, Bullseye, Lady Deathstrike, X-23, Daken, Omega Red

Adamantium is a fictional metal, most famously appearing as an alloy in American comic books published by Marvel Comics. It is best known as the substance bonded to the character Wolverine's skeleton and claws. It also appears in the 1941 story "Devil's Powder" by Malcolm Jameson.

== First mention in Marvel Comics ==
It was first mentioned in Marvel Comics in a story scripted by writer Roy Thomas and drawn by Barry Windsor-Smith and Syd Shores in The Avengers #66 (July 1969). Here, it is part of supervillain Ultron's outer shell. In the stories where it appears, the defining quality of adamantium is its indestructibility.

== Etymology ==
The word is a pseudo-Latin neologism (real Latin: adamans, from original Greek ἀδάμας "indomitable"; adamantem [Latin accusative]) based on the English noun and adjective adamant (and the derived adjective adamantine) added to the neo-Latin suffix "-ium". The adjective adamant has long been used to refer to the property of impregnable, diamond-like hardness, or to describe a firm/resolute position. The noun adamant describes any impenetrably or unyieldingly hard substance and, formerly, a legendary stone/rock or mineral of impenetrable hardness and with many other properties, often identified with diamond or lodestone.

Prior to adamantium's introduction, the term was used as a brand for The Metallurgo Syndicate, Ltd., of Balfour House, and in the 1941 short story "Devil's Powder" by Malcolm Jameson.

== Fictional history and properties ==
Adamantium was first developed by metallurgist Myron MacLain after he failed to replicate the accidental process which created the unique alloy forming Captain America's second shield in World War Two.

The components, blocks of chemical resins, are kept in separate batches before molding. Adamantium is prepared by melting the blocks together, mixing the components while the resin evaporates. Adamantium has a stable molecular structure that prevents it from being further molded even if the temperature is high enough to keep it in its liquefied form. In this liquid form, it does not emit visible light through black-body radiation. In its solid form, adamantium is near-impossible to destroy or fracture, and when molded to a sharp edge, can penetrate most lesser materials with minimal force.

Adamantium is used in Ultron's shell, Wolverine's skeleton and claws, Bullseye's skeleton, Lady Deathstrike's skeleton and talons, Cyber's skin and claws, X-23's claws, and Russian's body.

== Other versions ==
=== Carbonadium ===
Carbonadium is a resilient, unstable metal that is far stronger than steel but more flexible than adamantium. Carbonadium is implied to be similar to or even a variant of adamantium, but the extent of this relation has not been revealed. The process to create carbonadium is apparently even more difficult and expensive than that required to produce adamantium as there is only one carbonadium synthesizer in existence.

=== Secondary adamantium ===
Marvel's comic books introduced a variant of "true" adamantium, "secondary adamantium", to explain why in certain stories adamantium was shown to be damaged by sufficiently powerful forces. Its resilience is described as far below that of "true" adamantium.

=== Ultimate Marvel ===
In the Ultimate Marvel imprint, adamantium possesses the additional ability to protect against telepathic probing or attacks. Unlike its main universe counterpart, adamantium is not depicted as indestructible.

== Comparison with real materials ==
Scientist David Evans stated that, as adamantium "is considered to be a very dense and indestructible metal," the most suitable real material to model it would be osmium, "the densest known metallic element".

== See also ==
- Unobtainium
- Vibranium
