= List of Marvel Comics characters: H =

== Hack ==
Hack is one of the few survivors of Genosha after Cassandra Nova had Sentinels decimate the island, killing over 16 million mutants. He becomes a valuable asset on the island due to his telepathy, as all forms of electronic communication were eradicated or made useless by the attack.

Hack lost his powers during the events of "Decimation". Quicksilver steals Terrigen crystals from the Inhumans in an attempt to repower the mutants. He starts his mass efforts in Genosha and effectively restores the abilities of many on the island, including Hack. However, their abilities are amplified beyond control and quickly fade.

== Haechi ==
Haechi (Mark Sim) is among the latent Inhumans who gained powers from the Terrigen Mist bomb, gaining the ability to absorb energy and transform into a draconian bull-like creature resembling his namesake. Sim is initially mistaken for a mutant and blamed for the destruction caused by Sun Girl's battle with the Evolutionaries, servants of the High Evolutionary. He later joins a new incarnation of the New Warriors.

Haechi can absorb most types of energy directed toward him and expel it in the form of fiery blasts. After he obtains enough energy, Haechi is able to transform into a draconian creature. In his human form, Haechi possesses a single horn on his head and scales across his arms.

=== Haechi in other media ===
Haechi appears in Avengers Assemble, voiced by Todd Haberkorn.

== Hairbag ==
Hairbag (Michael Suggs) was recruited by Mister Sinister to be a member of his Nasty Boys, whose sole purpose was to harass X-Factor. Hairbag retained his mutant powers after the M-Day and opened a lab for mutant growth hormone production with Slab and Gorgeous George.

Hairbag possesses superhuman strength, agility, reflexes and hyper-keen senses. He has razor sharp fangs and claws, as well as flexible hair follicles.

=== Hairbag in other media ===
Hairbag appears in X-Men: The Animated Series, voiced by John Backwood.

== Gabrielle Haller ==
Gabrielle Haller is a character appearing in Marvel Comics. Haller was a catatonic Holocaust survivor who was awoken by Charles Xavier and fell in love with him as he and Magnus oversaw her recovery. When she is kidnapped by terrorist organization Hydra, led by the Nazi Baron Strucker, Charles and Magnus used their mutant powers to save her and defeat Hydra. Immediately afterwards, Magnus left Gabby and Charles feeling that her and Charles' view on mutants and humans contrasted his own. Magnus left with Nazi gold Hydra wanted to claim.

Over some time, the two amicably ended their relationship. Soon after, Charles leaves Israel unaware that Gabrielle was pregnant. Years later, Gabrielle became the Israeli ambassador to Great Britain living in Paris with her young son David. During a terrorist attack at her home claiming the life of David's godfather Daniel Shomron, David's mutant powers activated, ending with him killing the terrorists and putting himself in a catatonic state. David's powers manifest uncontrollably, absorbing the psyches of Tom Corsi and Sharon Friedlander. Moira MacTaggert is forced to call Xavier to help who is assisted by some of the New Mutants. When David absorbs MacTaggert's and Wolfsbane's psyches into his mind, Xavier and Danielle Moonstar use their powers to enter it as well. It is here that Xavier discovers he is David's father. Moonstar and David return everybody to their bodies, fixing most of David's mind and suppressing his personalities.

=== Gabrielle Haller in other media ===
- Gabrielle Haller appears in the X-Men: Evolution episode "Sins of the Son", voiced by Patricia Drake. This version is not associated with the Holocaust, was briefly married to Professor X when they were young before divorcing him due to his work with mutants, and hid David's existence from him.
- Gabrielle Xavier appears in Legion, portrayed by Stephanie Corneliussen.

== Hamir the Hermit ==
- Further reading: Hamir the Hermit at the Comic Book DB (archived from the original); Hamir the Hermit at the Grand Comics Database

Hamir the Hermit is a sorcerer and the descendant of Kan, who started the tradition of assisting sorcerers who used their magic for good. Hamir brought his son Wong to meet the Ancient One, becoming one of his disciples in the process. Hamir was constantly outdone by evil sorcerers such as Baron Mordo and Kaecilius whenever they came for the Ancient One; nonetheless he continued to serve his master in sickness and in health. Following the Ancient One's death, Hamir stayed at the temple and continued to train newer students.

=== Hamir the Hermit in other media ===
Hamir appears in the Marvel Cinematic Universe films Doctor Strange and Doctor Strange in the Multiverse of Madness, portrayed by Topo Wresniwiro. This version is missing his left hand and does not appear to be related to Wong.

== Hammer ==
Hammer is the name of several characters.

=== Eisenhower Canty ===
Hammer was an ally to the mutant Cable and a member of the Six Pack. In another version, described as Ultimate Eisenhower Canty, Canty appears as a member of the Six Pack. He first appeared in Cable: Blood and Metal #1 (April 1990), and was created by Fabian Nicieza and John Romita Jr.

=== Boris Lubov ===
Boris Lubov is a Russian villain who often fights Maverick/Agent Zero. He first appeared in Maverick #1 (September 1997), and was created by Jorge Gonzalez and Jim Cheung.

=== Hydra Four member ===
An unidentified Hammer first appeared in Amazing Spider-Man #520.

Hammer is a member of the Hydra group called the Hydra Four. He is the group's counterpart of Thor and wields a technological copy of Mjolnir.

== Caleb Hammer ==
- Further reading: Caleb Hammer at the Comic Book DB (archived from the original)

Caleb Hammer is an Old West Pinkerton detective who debuted in Marvel Premiere #54.

Hammer was one of the characters featured in Blaze of Glory, where he chases after Kid Colt, later teaming with him and other Western heroes to defend the town of Wonderment, Montana. During the battle the bounty hunter Gunhawk shoots Kid Colt in the back despite agreeing to put aside his chase of the Kid to defend Wonderment. Hammer strongly objects to this turn of events and ends up killing Gunhawk.

A flashback in X-Force #37 features an External named Absalom shooting an elderly Hammer in the back after Caleb refuses to participate in a duel with him.

== Sasha Hammer ==
Sasha Hammer is the daughter of Justine Hammer and the Mandarin as well as a relative of Justin Hammer and Temugin.

Sasha first appeared as the girlfriend/assistant to tech-terrorist Zeke Stane, providing support to Stane's attacks on Stark Industries. Hammer and Stane embark on a campaign to discredit Iron Man in the industrial market, conspiring with the corrupt Pentagon general Bruce Babbage and staging civilian attacks. Hammer was augmented by Stane, enabling her body to generate powerful energy of an unspecified type. She can project this energy from her hands in the form of whips and swords that she can use in physical combat. Her enhancements also give her ability to fly. Her abilities' limits have not been explicitly given yet she can destroy an automobile and can prove a considerable opponent to Iron Man, regarding her enhancements thanks to Stane as a "masterpiece". Her Detroit Steel armor has also been observed to have a directed-energy weapon in palm of her hands.

=== Sasha Hammer in other media ===
- Sasha Hammer appears in Iron Man: Rise of Technovore, voiced by Houko Kuwashima in the original Japanese version and Tara Platt in the English dub.
- The Marvel Cinematic Universe features the character Xu Xialing (portrayed by Meng'er Zhang), an original character with elements of Sasha Hammer, Zheng Bao Yu, and Sister Dagger.

== Hangman ==
Hangman is the name of several characters in Marvel Comics.

=== Harlan Krueger ===
Harlan Krueger was created by Marv Wolfman and Gil Kane and first appeared in Werewolf by Night #11.

After being court-martialed from the army for torturing prisoners of war, Krueger resolved to take the law into his own hands and became the masked vigilante the Hangman. His modus operandi involves executing male criminals while leaving female ones alive but imprisoned to 'protect them' from corruption (many died of starvation while in captivity). After years of stalking criminals with a noose and scythe, he comes into conflict with the Werewolf.

The Hangman later kills a disguised woman, thus inadvertently violating his own moral code. As he kneels over the corpse in remorse, he is fatally stabbed by film reviewer Matthew O'Brien, who had been trying to stop the Hangman from his latest killing spree.

=== Jason Roland ===
Jason Roland was created by Roy Thomas and Barry Smith, and first appeared in Tower of Shadows #5. He was an actor who made a deal with the demon Satannish to make his career successful, but was instead trapped in a monstrous form. He fought with the West Coast Avengers on several occasions.

As the Hangman, he possesses magically enhanced strength and durability. His rope is also magically enhanced, making it virtually indestructible. He can also levitate his rope and climb it without it being attached to anything. He is in almost constant communication with Satannish, who can enhance his powers as needed.

== Maya Hansen ==
Maya Hansen is a scientist who developed the Extremis virus alongside Aldrich Killian. When Killian steals a sample of the virus and sells it to domestic terrorists, she calls up her old friend Tony Stark to help recover it. After Stark is severely beaten by Mallen, a terrorist who had been injected with the virus, he convinces Maya to inject him with Extremis too. Stark defeats and apprehends Mallen, but he discovers that Killian could not have acted alone in selling Extremis. Stark confronts Maya, who confesses to assisting in the crime as she knew it would force defense contractors to renew their funding. She is subsequently taken into custody.

Hansen is captured by A.I.M. and forced to recreate the Extremis serum. Though Hansen is killed while trying to escape, she accomplishes her failsafe plan by sending a prerecorded message to Stark to warn him that the Extremis virus is on the loose again.

=== Maya Hansen in other media ===
- Maya Hansen appears in Iron Man 3, portrayed by Rebecca Hall. This version is a former lover of Tony Stark and a member of A.I.M.
- Maya Hansen appears in the Extremis motion comic, voiced by Theresa Spurrier.

== Harbinger of Apocalypse ==
The Harbinger of Apocalypse is a fictional character appearing in comic books published by Marvel Comics. The character, created by James Robinson and Jose Ladronn, first appeared in Cable #50 (November 1997). He was originally an unnamed human from the 1850s who is utilized by Apocalypse and Mister Sinister to transform him into a mutant that can adapt to any physical or energy attack.

== Hard-Drive ==
Hard-Drive is the name of several characters.

=== Inhuman version ===
Hard-Drive is an Inhuman cyborg who is a member of the Dark Riders.

=== Earth-1610 version ===
In the Ultimate Marvel reality, there is a female mutant named Hard-Drive who is a member of the Brotherhood of Mutant Supremacy. Not much is known about her mutant abilities.

In the "Ultimatum" storyline, Hard-Drive is among the Brotherhood of Mutant Supremacy members who were tortured and killed by Magneto's followers.

== Walter Hardy ==
Walter Hardy is a well-known cat burglar and the father of Felicia Hardy (Black Cat). Peter Parker learns that Walter has been imprisoned for several decades and is terminally ill. At the prison, Spider-Man fights Black Cat while her accomplices Boris Korpse and Bruno Grainger blast the wall to Walter's prison cell, the rubble of which buries Spider-Man.

Spider-Man and the police are unable to stop Black Cat, Korpse, and Grainger from capturing Walter Hardy. At her home, Black Cat reveals that she is Walter's daughter Felicia and that her mother Lydia purposefully hid his past from her. Walter then leaves to spend his final moments with his wife. After Black Cat falls into the river, Spider-Man meets with Lydia as she mourns Walter's death.

=== Walter Hardy in other media ===
- A character based on Walter Hardy named John Hardesky / The Cat appears in the Spider-Man: The Animated Series episodes "The Cat" and "The Black Cat", voiced by John Phillip Law. As a boy, he was tricked by the Nazis into spying on Captain America's creation using his photographic memory. When Hardesky discovered the truth, he was hunted by a group sent by the Red Skull, but he successfully evaded them. Years later, he enters protective S.H.I.E.L.D. custody after a heist gone wrong until the Kingpin has the Chameleon replace him to obtain the super-soldier formula. Upon discovering it, the Kingpin has Doctor Octopus kidnap Hardesky's daughter, Felicia Hardy, so he can use her as a test subject for the formula, transforming her into the Black Cat. Spider-Man follows Black Cat to the Kingpin's hideout and rescues her and Hardesky, destroying the super-soldier formula before it can be replicated. With the Kingpin's plan thwarted, Hardesky shares his goodbyes with his family and returns to S.H.I.E.L.D. custody.
- Walter Hardy, amalgamated with the Burglar, appears in The Spectacular Spider-Man, voiced by Jim Cummings in the episode "Intervention" and by James Remar in the episode "Opening Night". This version was a master thief who prided himself on never harming anyone during his crimes, until his old age forced him to begin carrying a gun for protection. After robbing a fight promoter, he was let go by Spider-Man, only to later accidentally kill his uncle, Ben Parker. He was subsequently captured by Spider-Man and sent to the Vault, a maximum security prison. In the present, Hardy is freed from his cell by his daughter Felicia amidst a prison break. However, Spider-Man recognizes him, and Hardy, expressing regret over his past, offers to make amends by staying behind to subdue the other escaped inmates.
- Walter Hardy appears in the Spider-Man (2018) downloadable content The City That Never Sleeps, voiced by Daniel Riordan. This version operated as the Black Cat twenty years prior to the events of the game and faked his death to protect his family from the Maggia, leading his daughter to take up the Black Cat mantle. In the present, Hardy, posing as NYPD detective Mackey, contacts Spider-Man and enlists his help to recover the paintings he had previously stolen and hidden. Once Spider-Man deduces his real identity, Hardy flees with the paintings, which are intended to fund his retirement, and asks Spider-Man to look after his daughter.

== Edith Harker ==
Edith Harker is the daughter of Quincy Harker and Elizabeth Harker and was kidnapped and transformed into a vampire by Dracula. She is later killed in battle with her father.

== Quincy Harker ==
Quincy Harker is a character appearing in American comic books published by Marvel comics and is based on a character in Bram Stoker's novel Dracula. He first appeared in Tomb of Dracula #7–8 (March, May 1973), and was adapted by Marv Wolfman and Gene Colan.

Quincy is the son of Jonathan Harker and Mina Harker. He was trained as a vampire hunter by Abraham Van Helsing, becoming his successor. In retaliation, Dracula causes Quincy's wife Elizabeth to commit suicide (out of her fear of him) and cripples Quincy, requiring him to use a wheelchair. Despite this, Quincy continues the fight, converting his house into a veritable vampire deathtrap and his wheelchair into a personal anti-vampire arsenal.

Ultimately, Quincy confronted Dracula alone at Castle Dracula itself in Transylvania. Knowing that he would die soon, as he had recently suffered a heart attack, he activated a time bomb in his wheelchair. Quincy plunged a silver wheelchair spoke into Dracula's heart and was about to sever the vampire's head when the explosives went off, killing Quincy and destroying the castle.

== Harold H. Harold ==
Harold H. Harold is a character in the Marvel Universe. He first appeared in Tomb of Dracula #37 (October 1975), and was created by Marv Wolfman and Gene Colan. Harold is a writer for the magazine True Vampire Stories who happens upon an injured and unconscious Dracula, and steals blood to revive him so he can get an interview.

Harold goes on to aid Quincy Harker's team of vampire hunters against Dracula on numerous occasions. This inspires him to write a novel, The Vampire Conspiracy, which is later adapted into a motion picture.

Harold tracks Dracula to Cleveland and finds him impaled by a wooden fence post courtesy of Howard the Duck. The vampire persuades Harold to free him, then bites him and turns him into a vampire.

== Harpy ==
Harpy is the name of two characters.

== Arthur Harrow ==
Arthur Harrow is a scientist with trigeminal neuralgia, which damaged the left part of his lips and gave them a permanent snarling appearance.

=== Arthur Harrow in other media ===
Arthur Harrow appears in Moon Knight, portrayed by Ethan Hawke. This version is the former avatar of Khonshu and the current avatar of Ammit. Though sharing his name with Harrow, he is described as an original character unrelated to his namesake.

== Danika Hart ==
Danika Hart is a blogger who attends New York University and vlogs on YouTube. When Spider-Man's costume is damaged during a fight, she uploads a video on YouTube that states that the second Spider-Man is a "kid of color" much to the dismay of the youth who was shown the video by Ganke Lee. Danika and Ganke later begin dating; to avoid her deducing his connections with Spider-Man, Ganke asked her to call him by his alias of "Ned".

=== Danika Hart in other media ===
Danika Hart appears in Spider-Man: Miles Morales and Spider-Man 2, voiced by Ashly Burch. This version is the host of a podcast called "The Danikast" and rival of J. Jonah Jameson.

== Harvest ==
Harvest was created by writer Scott Lobdell and artist John Romita Jr., and first appeared in Uncanny X-Men vol. 1 #308 (November 1993).

Jonathan Mauro Camden was a human businessman and family man from Missouri with anti-mutant sentiment, willingly being a part of the Phalanx, imprisoning Monet St. Croix, Husk, Skin and Blink before Banshee, Emma Frost, Jubilee and Sabretooth tracked him down and kills him, setting up the formation of Generation X.

== Hauptmann Deutschland ==
Markus Ettlinger / Hauptmann Deutschland (German for Captain Germany), also known as Vormund (Guardian), is part of a team called the Schutz Heiliggruppe, a national superteam protecting Germany. He first appeared in a backup story in Captain America where the Schutz Heiliggruppe captured the Red Skull and abducted him back to Germany in an attempt to put him on trial for war crimes. Captain America, who were actually shapeshifting "bioplastoid" androids created by the Red Skull's lackey Arnim Zola.

Realizing the deception, Hauptmann Deutschland followed the Red Skull back to America. After a brawl with Captain America, the heroes teamed up to track the Red Skull. They concluded the hunt when confronted with a false corpse of the Red Skull. The false Red Skull had been shot through the head and appeared to have been killed by the Scourge of the Underworld.

Vormund set out with Zeitgeist, another member of the Schutz Heiliggruppe, in order to investigate the death of their partner Blitzkrieger who had been killed while investigating the murders of multiple South American local superheroes. Although Vormund was framed for the murders, it was eventually discovered that Zeitgeist was actually Everyman. While fleeing Captain America, Zeitgeist tries to stab Vormund with his sword, but is killed when Vormund redirects the force of his attack.

=== Naming controversy of Hauptman Deutschland ===
When the issues of Captain America containing Hauptmann Deutschland and the rest of the Schutz Heiliggruppe were to be published in Germany by licensee Condor Interpart, the names of the team were changed in accordance with the German taboos on references to Nazism, despite the team being distinctly anti-Nazi in behavior and the fact that Hauptmann Deutschland's name (literal translation: "Captain Germany") contains no actual reference to Nazism. In Germany, Hauptmann Deutschland was renamed Freiheitskämpfer (Freedom Fighter).

Due to a lack of coordination, when Hauptmann Deutschland next appeared in American comics, he was renamed Vormund, which means "legal guardian", "warden" or "custodian". Per Markus Raymond, a submitter to The Appendix to The Official Handbook of the Marvel Universe, Vormund actually should be used only in reference to a "legal guardian for a child or somebody else who can't talk legally for himself".

=== Vormund in other media ===
Vormund appears in Lego Marvel Super Heroes 2.

== Haven ==
- First appearance: X-Factor #96 (November 1993)
- Created by: J.M. DeMatteis, Greg Luzniak
- Species: Human (fetus is human mutant)
- Aliases: Haven

Haven (Radha Dastoor) was the best-selling author of a book about the new humanity that would result from humans and mutants evolving into one race. She planned to bring this 'new humanity' about by destroying three quarters of the world in a Mahapralaya, or 'Great Destruction', as foretold in her Hindu teachings.

X-Factor opposes her, but she is able to sway Wolfsbane by curing her of the genetic engineering that had turned her into a mindless Genoshan mutate, allowing her to once again assume human form. X-Factor shuts down her entire operation with the help of her brother Monsoon. She attempts to cure Jamie Madrox (secretly one of his duplicates) from the Legacy Virus, but she fails and he dies, leaving X-Factor to believe the original Madrox is dead.

Haven has no powers, but is carrying a mutant fetus, with various abilities ranging from healing to telepathy to opening dimensional portals into personal pocket dimensions. The fetus acts through Haven, leaving the true nature of the situation unknown to the general populace. The fetus was the product of an old affair that never came to term, instead remaining a sentient embryo. Haven's efforts to cause destruction attract the attention of the Adversary, who uses her fetus to return himself to the world, consuming Haven in the process.

== Pamela Hawley ==
- Further reading: Pamela Hawley at the Comic Book DB (archived from the original); Pamela Hawley at the Grand Comics Database

Pamela Hawley is a character in the Marvel Comics universe. The character, created by Stan Lee and Jack Kirby, first appeared in Sgt. Fury and his Howling Commandos #4 (November 1963).

Hawley was a Red Cross medic who helped soldiers during World War II. Nick Fury meets her, falling in love with her because of her determined and "stubborn" attitude, but not thinking she would return these feelings. Her father Lord Hawley asked Fury to search for her brother Percy Hawley after being kidnapped by Nazis. Unfortunately, Percy was a Nazi sympathizer and Fury was forced to kill the man. To keep her from grief, Fury told Hawley that Percy died a hero. Hawley would go on to date Fury who, despite getting ridiculed and poked fun at by the Howling Commandos, ensured that she was loved. Despite Fury's overall character, Hawley considered Fury a "gentleman".

At one point, the time-displaced Morgana Blessing and Doctor Strange arrive, with the former discovering that she is Hawley's spiritual descendant. Along with Fury and Dum Dum Dugan, they battle Baron Mordo's minion, Sir Baskerville, using the power of Fury and Hawley's love. Doctor Strange then erases everyone's memories of the event.

Fury planned on proposing to Hawley, but discovers through her father that she died in an air raid.

=== Pamela Hawley in other media ===
Councilwoman Hawley appears in live-action films set in the Marvel Cinematic Universe, portrayed by Jenny Agutter. This version is a member of the World Security Council who oversees S.H.I.E.L.D. as one of Nick Fury's superiors.

== Haywire ==
Haywire (Harold Danforth) has the ability to create and project strands of 5mm diameter metallic "tanglewires". These wires can be created at some distance from his body, and disappear if he loses consciousness. Haywire was a member of Nighthawk's group of freedom fighters, the Redeemers, whose purpose was to overthrow the government controlled by the Squadron Supreme. During, this time he was romantically involved with fellow Redeemer Inertia. Haywire was one of the Redeemers who joined the Squadron Supreme as a double agent in order to sabotage their efforts at world conquest. With his fellow Redeemers, Haywire fought the Squadron, forcing them to end their dictatorship over the United States of "Other-Earth". Haywire battled the Whizzer during the huge battle. After the battle, some of the surviving Redeemers joined the Squadron Supreme, including Haywire.

Haywire happens across a battle between Thanos of Titan (self-styled god of death) and Mantis (also known as the Celestial Madonna), as Thanos attempts to destroy Quoi, her child (destined to become the Celestial Messiah). Haywire tries to help Mantis and eventually, Mantis elicits help from Haywire and an assemblage of Avengers in defeating Thanos's efforts to kill her son. In the process, Haywire hopes to encounter the cosmic embodiment of Death to restore Inertia to life. Ultimately, Haywire gets his chance, but Death does not respond to his pleas. Distraught and obsessed, Haywire leaps into the form of Death itself and is killed.

== Hazmat ==
Hazmat is the name of two characters appearing in Marvel Comics.

=== Jennifer Takeda ===
Hazmat (Jennifer Takeda) is a student of the Avengers Academy whose body naturally generates radiation. She discovers this ability when her boyfriend goes into a seizure while making out with her, an event that leads her family to all but abandon her, said boyfriend to dump her, and Takeda to have to wear a containment suit on a regular basis. Hazmat enters a relationship with Mettle, one of the only people who can physically touch her.

Hazmat constantly emits harmful radiation, forcing her to wear a protective suit at all times when around others. The suit serves the additional purpose of enabling her to focus her radiation into energy bolts. Although her abilities manifested during her teens without obvious explanation, it has been confirmed that she is not a mutant.

=== Keith Kilham ===
Hazmat (Keith Kilham) is a supervillain appearing in the video game Marvel Nemesis: Rise of the Imperfects. Hazmat was a scientist for the Board of Health that was exposed to an array of experimental treatments after a terror attack, giving him the ability to project toxic substances. He made his mainstream universe debut in Venom #1 (October 2026).

=== Hazmat in other media ===
- The Jennifer Takeda incarnation of Hazmat appears as a playable character in Lego Marvel's Avengers.
- The Jennifer Takeda incarnation of Hazmat appears in Marvel Snap.

== Headcase ==
Headcase (Sean Madigan) is a character appearing in American comic books published by Marvel Comics. The character first appeared in Ms. Marvel (vol. 2) #11 (January 2007), and was created by Brian Reed and Roberto De La Torre. Headcase first appeared in Ms. Marvel (vol. 2) #17 (July 2007). He is the son of MODOK who tried to utilize A.I.M. before his terrorist ambitions are foiled by Carol Danvers and the Scientist Supreme.

== Headlok ==
Headlok (Arthur Goddard) is a character appearing in American comic books published by Marvel Comics. The character first appeared in The West Coast Avengers (vol. 2) #10 (July 1986), and was created by Steve Englehart and Al Milgrom. The character subsequently appears in Alpha Flight #93–96 (Feb.–May 1991), #102–104 (Nov. 1991-Jan. 1992) and Thunderbolts #55–58 (Oct. 2001-Jan. 2002). Headlok received an entry in the Official Handbook of the Marvel Universe Update '89 #3.

This mysterious menace found the Griffin roaming the Adirondack Mountains and used his mental powers to enslave the Griffin. Headlok tricked the West Coast Avengers by claiming to have spotted Ben Grimm whom the team was looking for. Headlok ambushed them with the Griffin and attempted to take over their minds one by one. The Avenger Tigra was able to calm the Griffin's rage. It turns out the Thing had indeed been nearby and he joined the battle. Headlok, not knowing this, had not been using his powers to hide himself from sight or mentally influence Ben Grimm and thus was taken by surprise and Headlok was swiftly defeated.

Headlok has since been seen working for S.H.I.E.L.D. alongside Bennet Du Paris. They were brought in to deal with a rogue mutant as part of S.H.I.E.L.D.'s Psi-division. The psychic confrontation appears to have left Headlok dead. This death is eventually undone when Cyclops' former student, Tempus, goes back in time to erase a rogue mutant's existence.

== Headpool ==
Headpool is an alternate universe version of Deadpool who was converted into a zombie, then lost his body, becoming a disembodied head. This incarnation of Deadpool, frequently referred to as Headpool, entered the mainstream Marvel continuity when he is encountered and captured by the original Deadpool in Deadpool: Merc with a Mouth. Along with several other alternate versions of Deadpool, Headpool went on to appear in Deadpool Corps with a propeller beanie mounted to his body, granting him flight.

=== Headpool in other media ===
- Headpool appears in Deadpool & Wolverine, portrayed by Geoff Redknap and voiced by Nathan Fillion.
- Headpool appears in Marvel's Deadpool VR, voiced by Freddy Rodriguez.
- Headpool appears in Marvel Snap.

== Healer ==
Healer is an elderly member of the Morlocks who can heal other mutants. His name and past prior to joining the Morlocks are unknown.

Healer is amongst the few Morlocks who escape the massacre of their community by the Marauders. He is dispatched to Muir Island to tend to the wounded survivors of the massacre.

Healer seeks out the Morlocks' former leader, Callisto, to enlist her aid in resuming leadership of the Morlocks following the death of the usurper, Masque. Rejecting Healer's request, Callisto is attacked by the Morlocks. Healer uses all of his power to heal Callisto, dying in the process.

Healer resurfaces on Krakoa, having presumably been resurrected by the Five.

=== Healer in other media ===
Healer appears in X-Men Legends, voiced by Ed Asner.

== Hecate ==
Hecate

Publication information
- Publisher: Marvel Comics
- First appearance: Ms. Marvel #11 (Nov. 1977)
- Created by: Chris Claremont; Sal Buscema

In-story information
- Abilities: During exile: Energy projection; Illusion casting; Olympian powers: Superhuman strength, speed, stamina and durability; Immortality; Powerful magical abilities

Hecate is a character appearing in American comic books published by Marvel Comics, based on the Greek goddess of the same name. Created by Chris Claremont and Sal Buscema, she first appeared in Ms. Marvel #11 (1977). The character has since made several appearances in various Marvel Comics titles.

In the Marvel Comics universe, Hecate is among the Titans who ruled the ancient world that Zeus spares when he deposes them and conquers Olympus, and becomes Olympus' resident Goddess of Magic. She is the first deity to give magic to mortals, in defiance of Zeus who had forbidden the gods from meddling with humans. Zeus later exiles her from Olympus, wiping her memories and stripping her of her powers.

== H.E.L.E.N. ==
- First appearance: Iron Man vol. 4 #2 (November 2012)
- Created by: Kieron Gillen

H.E.L.E.N. (initially known as P.E.P.P.E.R.) is a character appearing in American comic books published by Marvel Comics. Created by Kieron Gillen, H.E.L.E.N. first appeared in Iron Man vol. 4 #2 (November 2012).

H.E.L.E.N. is an artificial intelligence created by Tony Stark / Iron Man and is initially based on Pepper Potts.

== Helleyes ==
Helleyes is a character appearing in American comic books published by Marvel Comics. He debuted in Adventures into Fear #28 (June 1975).

Hellfire is a demon who conquered a "Hell" realm before targeting Earth.

== Hellfire ==
Hellfire is the name of two characters.

== Hellifino ==
Hellifino (Eli Hartman) is a character in Marvel Comics. He was created by Dan Slott and Paco Medina, and first appeared in Spider-Boy #1 (November 2023).

Eli Hartman is a child and friend of Spider-Boy (Bailey Briggs) who was captured alongside him by Madame Monstrosity and transformed into an African elephant/black rhinoceros hybrid. Madame Monstrosity was inspired by Eli's joke about the hypothetical combination of an elephant and rhinoceros. In the present, Bailey resurfaces after being erased from existence by Shathra and subsequently resurrected. Madame Monstrosity forces Eli to battle Spider-Boy.

Following Madame Monstrosity's defeat, Hellifino chooses to live on her farm with Boy-Spider and Bailey's mother Tabitha as his transformation is irreversible.

Eli is frustrated by having to live in hiding, but Spider-Boy convinces him to become a superhero under the name Captain Pachyderm while using a custom suit that Spider-Boy created for him.

== Hellverine ==
Hellverine is the alias of several characters appearing in American comic books published by Marvel Comics. The character is typically depicted as Wolverine being put under and empowered by demonic possession, granting him additional powers similar to those of a Ghost Rider.

=== First version ===
The first Hellverine appeared in Wolverine (vol. 4) #1 (September 2010) and was created by Jason Aaron and Renato Gudes.

An unnamed powerful demon was summoned from Hell by the criminal organization known as the Red Right Hand as part of their revenge against Wolverine. The organization captures Wolverine and sends his soul to Hell while the demon takes control over his body. Now known as Hellverine, the demon was tasked by the Red Right Hand to killing Wolverine's friends and loved ones. Hellverine tracks down and kills John Wraith, attempts to kill Mystique and Daken for betraying the Red Right Hand and attacks Yukio and Amiko Kobayashi but the two are able to escape from him. Hellverine then sets his sights on the X-Men and travels to Utopia while still disguised as Wolverine. Hellverine's ruse is discovered and he fights the X-Men, who are joined by Mystique, the Ghost Riders Johnny Blaze and Danny Ketch, and Daimon Hellstrom. Thanks to Hellstrom's ritual and Wolverine's own actions in Hell, Wolverine's soul returns to his body and battles for control with Hellverine. Due to the efforts of the X-Men, Wolverine's girlfriend Melita Garner and a subconscious projection of the deceased Nightcrawler, Wolverine regains control over his body and the demon is banished back to Hell.

=== Logan ===
During the "Ghost Rider/Wolverine: Weapons of Vengeance" event, Wolverine is captured by Project Hellfire and has the demon Bagra-ghul grafted onto him, turning him into Hellverine. Hellverine is sent to kill mutants but Hellverine is able to fight off his programing while Johnny Blaze exorcises Bagra-ghul from Wolverine and seals him in stone.

=== Akihiro ===
Bagra-ghul breaks free from his seal and resurrects and possesses the recently killed Akihiro, turning him into Hellverine.

== Hemingway ==
Hemingway is a member of the Gene Nation. When Mikhail Rasputin flooded the Morlock tunnels, many were believed dead. However, at the last instant, Mikhail opened a portal into a parallel dimension dubbed The Hill, through which several Morlocks escaped. In this dimension, time moves at a faster rate, and even though it was a manner of months in the main Marvel Universe, it had been between 10 and 20 years on the Hill.

On the anniversary of the Mutant Massacre, in which the Marauders killed many Morlocks, the members of Gene Nation returned to Earth, aiming to kill one hundred humans for every Morlock who died. They are defeated, but Hemingway escapes.

Hemingway's final appearance is in the pages of Weapon X, where he is killed by Agent Zero.

== Hephaestus ==
Hephaestus is a character appearing in American comic books published by Marvel Comics. He first appeared in Thor #129 (June 1966) and was adapted from the Greek mythology figure by Stan Lee and Jack Kirby.

He is the Olympian pantheon's blacksmith. He is not to be confused with the Eternal Phastos. Immortal and possessing superhuman physical attributes similar to those of the other Olympians, Hephaestus is a master weapons maker and inventor, able to make weapons which could kill even Hercules, but lacks the ability to project any form of energy, mystical or non-mystical. He made Hercules's mace, Ares' armor, and Zeus' chariot.

== Noboru Hideki ==
Noboru-Hideki is a character appearing in American comic books published by Marvel Comics. Created by writer Chris Claremont and artist Frank Miller, the character first appeared in Wolverine #1 (September 1982). He is the abusive husband of Mariko Yashida in order to settle a massive criminal debt incurred by Shingen Yashida before his cowardly nature towards Wolverine results in Yukio killing him.

=== Noboru Hideki in other media ===
- Noboru Hideki / Silver Samurai appears in the Wolverine and the X-Men episode "Code of Conduct", voiced by Keone Young.
- Hideki Kurohagi appears in Marvel Anime: Wolverine, voiced by Kazuki Yao in the Japanese version and by Vic Mignogna in the English dub.
- Noburo Mori appears in The Wolverine, portrayed by Brian Tee.

== Hijacker ==
Hijacker is the name of two characters in Marvel Comics. Both are supervillains who specialize in stealing technology for later resale in criminal auctions.

=== Howard Mitchell ===
Originally the owner of an armored car company, Howard Mitchell adopts the masked alias of Hijacker to steal the cargo his cars are transporting and thus mend the financial difficulties of his firm. Following a battle with Black Goliath and the Thing, Hijacker returns for vengeance on the Thing after the latter is hospitalized. He uses a tank similar in appearance to his last one, but it is not as durable and Iron Man makes quick work of it.

Hijacker was among the villains killed by the Scourge of the Underworld, a vigilante targeting criminals.

=== Mercenary ===
The second Hijacker is an unnamed mercenary who took on the mantle after buying vehicle-upgrading nanites from Overdrive. He works as a hired henchman through Power Broker's Hench App.

== Hildegarde ==
Hildegarde is one of the Valkyries. Odin sent Sif and Hildegarde to Blackworld. There, they came upon a town where people were fleeing in blind terror from Ego-Prime, which was created accidentally from Ego the Living Planet by Tana Nile. Sif and Hildegarde joined forces with Tana Nile, and escaped with her to Earth.

== Hildegund ==
- Further reading: Hildegund at the Comic Book DB (archived from the original); Hildegund at the Grand Comics Database

Hildegund, sometimes called Gudrun, is the wife of Volstagg of the Warriors Three. They have ten sons (Alaric, Arngrim, Einar, Gunnar, Hrolf, Leif, Rolfe, Svein, Sigfod, Thakrad), four daughters (Flosi, Gudrun, Gunnhild, Jargsa) and numerous unnamed children. At some point, twins, Mick and Kevin Mortensen were orphaned when their mother, Ruby, was killed by Zaniac. Thor took the twins to Asgard where Volstagg and Hildegund lovingly accepted them with open arms. When Loki returned, albeit as a child, everyone in Asgard turned him away except for Volstagg and Hildegund, the latter feeling that he just needed motherly love and affection.

=== Hildegund in other media ===
Hildegund appears in Thor: The Dark World, portrayed by Claire Brown.

== Tyesha Hillman ==
Tyesha Hillman is a character appearing in American comic books published by Marvel Comics. The character was created by writer G. Willow Wilson and artist Takeshi Miyazawa, and first appeared in Ms. Marvel (vol. 4) #2 (December 2015).

=== Tyesha Hillman in other media ===
Tyesha Hillman appears in Ms. Marvel (2022), portrayed by Travina Springer.

== Carol Hines ==
Carol Hines is a technician who works for the Weapon X project. She is present when Wolverine is infused with adamantium and when he escapes from Weapon X.

Hines is present when Professor Thorton tells her that Wolverine is playing right into his hands. He tells Hines that they are to book a flight to Canada immediately. Thorton and Carol Hines enter a room to continue monitoring Wolverine as Thorton activates the Shiva program. As Wolverine fights the Shiva robot, Hines and Professor Thorton are attacked by Silver Fox, who knocks out Hines and kills Thorton.

Hydra later captures Hines and forces her to divulge classified information about Weapon X. Hines dies from fright after seeing Aldo Ferro's Psi-Borg form, with Ferro making it appear that he snapped her neck.

=== Carol Hines in other media ===
- Carol Hines makes a non-speaking appearance in a flashback in Hulk Vs.
- Carol Hines appears in X2: Wolverine's Revenge, voiced by Jennifer Hale.
- A character loosely based on Carol Hines called Carol Frost appears in X-Men Origins: Wolverine, portrayed by Asher Keddie.
- Carol Frost appears in X-Men Origins: Wolverine, voiced by Anna Graves.

== Hindsight ==
Hindsight is the name of two characters in Marvel Comics.

=== Carlton LaFroyge ===
Soon after Robbie Baldwin (the superhero Speedball) moves into his building, Carlton LaFroyge discovers his secret identity. He uses this information to blackmail him. Baldwin refuses to cooperate. Soon, the New Warriors are captured by a street gang called the Poison Memories. The Poison Memories had viciously attacked the team's relatives, which led to the death of Rage's grandmother.

LaFroyge creates a caped costume that includes automobile side mirrors attached to a football helmet. He summons the help of Night Thrasher to help free the team. Through this, he forces himself into the New Warriors as an unofficial member, calling himself Hindsight Lad.

At the start of the "Civil War" storyline, the New Warriors are involved in a battle that leads to Nitro devastating Stamford, Connecticut, killing most of the New Warriors and hundreds of civilians. LaFroyge, now retired from heroics, turns against his former teammates, setting up an anti-New Warriors website called DestroyAllWarriors.com. Through the site, LaFroyge publicly exposes the Warrior's civilian identities and incites violence against them. She-Hulk helps Justice, Rage, Ultra Girl, Slapstick, and Firestar locate LaFroyge and force him to shut the site down. Afterward, LaFroyge is arrested by She-Hulk's fiancée John Jameson.

=== Nathaniel Carver ===
Nathaniel Carver is a student at the Xavier Institute with the mutant ability of psychometry. Shortly after his arrival, he is introduced to Benjamin Deeds, who will be his classmate. After becoming involved in a fight between Quentin Quire and several other students, Nathaniel considers leaving the institute. However, he is forced to stay when the Purifiers attack the institute. Nathaniel, Benjamin, and several other students take refuge in the institute's library while Quire confronts the Purifiers, forcing them to attack each other using his psychic powers. After the Purifiers are dealt with, Nathaniel decides to stay at the institute to gain control of his powers. Nathaniel and Benjamin are later revealed to be gay and enter a relationship.

== Hippolyta ==
Hippolyta is a supervillain appearing in American comic books published by Marvel Comics. Created by writer Stan Lee and artist Jack Kirby, the character first appeared in Thor #127 (April 1966). She is the queen of the Amazons and the daughter of Ares. The character is inspired by the queen of the Amazons Hippolyta in Greek mythology.

== H'kurrek ==
H'kurrek is the commander of a Skrull ship and a delegate for the Skrull queen Veranke. He leads a Skrull invasion on San Francisco, but surrenders after the Super-Skrull forces are infected with the Legacy Virus. H'kurrek was created by Mike Carey and Cary Nord, and first appeared in Secret Invasion: X-Men #1 (August 2008).

== Hobgoblin ==
=== Hobgoblin (Imperial Guard) ===
- First appearance: The X-Men #107 (October 1977)
- Created by: Chris Claremont and Dave Cockrum
- Species: Chameloid
- Teams: Imperial Guard
- Abilities: Shapeshifting

Hobgoblin is the name of three Chameloid shapeshifters who are members of the Shi'ar Imperial Guard. Created by Chris Claremont and Dave Cockrum, the first Hobgoblin debuted in The X-Men #107 (October 1977). Like many original members of the Imperial Guard, Hobgoblin is based on a character from DC Comics' Legion of Super-Heroes: in his case Chameleon Boy.

== Benjamin Hochberg ==
Benjamin Hochberg is a district attorney working in New York City. The character was created by Charles Soule and Ron Garney, first appeared in Daredevil (vol. 5) #2 (December 2015).

=== Benjamin Hochberg in other media ===
Benjamin Hochberg appears in Daredevil: Born Again, portrayed by John Benjamin Hickey.

== Hoder ==
Hoder is a blind elder Asgardian god. At one point, Loki tricks Hoder into nearly killing Balder by shooting him with an arrow made of mistletoe wood, the only substance to which Balder is vulnerable. As well as possessing the superhuman abilities shared by all the Gods of Asgard, such as superhuman strength, Hoder can also receive visions of a far distant future or of events that will occur in other realities. Hoder first appeared in Thor #274–275 (August–September 1978), and was adapted from the deity of the same name by Roy Thomas and John Buscema.

== Crusher Hogan ==
Joseph "Crusher" Hogan is a wrestler in Marvel Comics. The character, created by Stan Lee and Steve Ditko, first appeared in Amazing Fantasy #15 (August 1962).

Joseph Hogan, who went by the nickname Crusher Hogan, was a professional wrestler who worked for the Wrestling League. The Wrestling League was losing money due to a rival wrestling company. While his wife wanted him to quit, he instead offered cash money to whoever was able to beat him in wrestling. This worked as people would pay to fight him only to lose.

Young Peter Parker, who had just been bitten by the radioactive spider and was looking to make money, took up the offer and put on a disguise to fight him. To Hogan's surprise, he was defeated and Peter won the money.

Years later, Hogan works as a janitor at a gym. It was revealed that after his defeat at the hands of Spider-Man, his life went to pieces. His wife left him, the Wrestling League fell apart, and he's looked down upon by his peers. Hogan regales stories of how he "trained" Spider-Man and gave him his web shooters and costume. Hogan discovered that one of the boxers at the gym was in trouble with the local criminal Madame Fang. Hogan takes on her muscle Manslaughter Marsdale, but is overmatched. Spider-Man arrives to defeat Marsdale and afterwards confirms Hogan's stories, giving a little bit of credibility and respect to Hogan's reputation.

=== Crusher Hogan in other media ===
- Crusher Hogan appears in a flashback in the Spider-Man and His Amazing Friends episode "Along Came Spidey".
- Crusher Hogan appears in a flashbacks in Spider-Man: The Animated Series.
- A character based on Crusher Hogan named Bone Saw McGraw appears in Spider-Man (2002), portrayed by Randy Savage.
- Crusher Hogan appears in a flashback in The Spectacular Spider-Man episode "Intervention", voiced by Jim Cummings.
- A character based on Crusher Hogan named Bonesaw McGee appears in Spider-Man (2017), voiced by Steve Blum.

== H.O.M.E.R. ==
- First appearance: Iron Man vol. 1 #298 (November 1993)
- Created by: Len Kaminski; Tom Tenney

H.O.M.E.R. (short for Heuristically Operative Matrix Emulation Rostrum) is a character appearing in American comic books published by Marvel Comics. Created by Len Kaminski and Tom Tenney, H.O.M.E.R. first appeared in Iron Man vol. 1 #298 (November 1993).

H.O.M.E.R. is an artificial intelligence created by Tony Stark / Iron Man and Abe Zimmer for assistance within Stark Enterprises.

=== H.O.M.E.R. in other media ===
- H.O.M.E.R. appears in Iron Man, voiced by Tom Kane.
- H.O.M.E.R. appears in The Incredible Hulk episode "Helping Hand, Iron Fist", voiced again by Tom Kane.

== Hope ==
Hope is the name of three unrelated characters who appear in Marvel Comics.

=== Future freedom fighter ===
Hope is a member of Chan Chosen in an alternate future timeline where Cable was raised. She is the sister of Aliya Dayspring / Jenskot.

==== Hope in other media ====
Hope appears in the X-Men: The Animated Series episode "Time Fugitives", voiced by Barbara Rudd.

=== Esperanza Ling ===
Esperanza Ling was created by Louise Simonson and Pasqual Ferry, and first appeared in Warlock #1 (October 1999).

Hope is a Cuban mutant with the power to transmute inorganic matter. At a young age, she is exposed to the transmode virus during an encounter with the Phalanx and is a carrier of the virus without being affected by it. She is later imprisoned by the United States government as part of Project Mainspring, along with the transmode-infected monkey Chi-Chee. Hope is freed by Warlock, who she allies with in search of a cure.

=== Future individual ===
A time-displaced individual from the future was created by Duane Swierczynski and Ariel Olivetti, and first appeared in Cable vol. 2 #7 (October 2008).

Hope is the second wife of Nathan Summers / Cable and the adoptive mother of Hope Summers.

== Phineas Horton ==
Professor Phineas Thomas Horton is a character appearing in American comic books published by Timely Comics, predecessor company of Marvel Comics. He first appeared in Marvel Mystery Comics #1 (September 1939) and was created by Carl Burgos.

Phineas Horton is the creator of the original Human Torch. He is later revealed to be the stepfather of Frankie Raye, and the grandfather of Victoria Anderson.

=== Phineas Horton in other media ===
Phineas Horton appears in VisionQuest, portrayed by Paul Bettany. This version worked on the creation of J.I.M., an artificial being while grappling with the loss of his son James. This caused him to become estranged from his wife Violette and daughter Victoria. In addition, Horton has a grandson named Virgil Horton (portrayed by James Spader).

== Bailey Hoskins ==
Bailey Hoskins is a young mutant with the ability to detonate his own body, killing himself in the process with no means to reconstitute himself. He is the star of X-Men: Worst X-Man Ever, a 2016 five-issue mini-series, where he joins the Xavier Institute after his parents' death, but fails to find his place among his peers. He befriends fellow mutant Miranda, with the ability to vastly alter reality, diverging them from Earth-616 to Earth-61403. Bailey uses his power in the future to kill a fellow mutant that went mad with power and took over the world, but reality was rewritten by Miranda.

== Hoss ==
Hoss is a demon, an enemy and occasional ally of the Ghost Rider. Hoss has been described as "one of Hell's most able tracker-scouts". Hoss first appeared in Ghost Rider (vol. 5) #1 (November 2005) and was created by writer Garth Ennis and artist Clayton Crain.

== John Howard ==
John Howard is a character appearing in Marvel Comics. The character was created by Harry Sahle, and first appeared in Human Torch vol. 1 #9 (September 1942). He was a nephew who was to receive an inheritance from Ruben Hartnett, but gets murdered by Mr. Smythe posing as his uncle.

=== Alternate versions of John Howard ===
A completely different version of the character appears in the alternate Ultimate Marvel universe. The character, created by Jonathan Hickman, Sam Humphries, and Luke Ross, first appeared in Ultimate Comics: Ultimates #10 (May 2012). He is the President of the United States and was previously the Secretary of Energy who reluctantly works with the Ultimates as he struggled to keep America stable until he is removed from power due to blackmail that causes his executive authority to be revoked.

=== John Howard in other media ===
An original incarnation of John Howard appears in Insomniac Games' Marvel's Spider-Man series, voiced by Dave Fennoy.

== H'rpra ==
H'rpra is a character appearing within American comic books involving Marvel Comics. The character, created by Roy Thomas, Dan Thomas and David Ross, first appeared in Avengers West Coast #91 (December 1992).

H'rpra was a Skrull who posed as Mockingbird.

== Hub ==
Hub is a mutant survivor of the Genoshan massacre with the power of teleporting herself and others long distances. After the massacre, she allied herself with Unus the Untouchable and his gang. She would later ally herself with the Genoshan Excalibur team. M-Day would cause Hub to lose her powers, but she regained them due to Quicksilver using Terrigen crystals on her and other Genoshan mutants who lost their powers. Her powers soon went out of control and she was given medical care before again losing her powers. Hub was created by Chris Claremont and Aaron Lopresti and made her first appearance in Excalibur (vol. 3) #1 (May, 2004).

== Hulk Robot ==
The Hulk Robot is the name of several characters.

=== Military's Hulk Robot ===
The first Hulk Robot was a simulacrum created by the scientists at Gamma Base that was used to test the value of the Iceberg Rocket that General Thunderbolt Ross had his scientists create.

A later model of the Hulk Robot was operated by a remote that is worn by an individual at a safe distance. During the time he was cured of his gamma-radiation condition, Bruce Banner uses the robot to battle the Leader during his takeover of Gamma Base. The Hulk Robot is destroyed, generating feedback that nearly kills Banner.

Another version of the military's Hulk Robot came into the possession of the magician Kropotkin the Great during one of his visits to Gamma Base.

=== Second Hulk Robot ===
Rusty and Arthur are two Maryland Institute of Technology students who constructed a Hulk robot to be the mascot for their school's all-star game, but Dr. Timothy Ryan considered it dangerous and would not allow it. It was brought to life by cosmic energies released by the Eternals from Olympia when they emerged from the Uni-Mind. The energies granted the Hulk Robot sentience and increased its strength to rival the Hulk.

During the Fall of the Hulks storyline, Galactus' Cosmos Automaton influences Mad Thinker into creating a new Hulk robot. Red Hulk and A-Bomb consider destroying the robot, but it activates after absorbing Red Hulk's energy. The group Intelligencia obtains the Hulk Robot and uses it to attack former member Doctor Doom.

== Hulkette ==
Hulkette was originally created for a non-canon variant cover in Sensational She-Hulk (2023), which envisioned her as a forgotten sidekick of She-Hulk. Hulkette made her canon debut in Spider-Boy #13 (2024).

Hulkette initially appears as one of several superhumans who are invited to compete in the Challenge of the Jade Dragon before Spider-Boy and Daredevil steal the invitational tickets of Hulkette and her mentor Enormo. Hulkette is among the heroes who aid the New Champions in battling an army of zombie trolls.

== Human Top ==
Human Top is the name of several characters appearing in American comic books published by Marvel Comics.

=== Bruce Bravelle ===
The Human Top (or just the Top) is a Golden Age superhero appearing in American comic books published by Marvel Comics. The character appeared in two stories published by Timely Comics (the predecessor of Marvel Comics) in 1940 and 1942, and not since then. His real name is Bruce Bravelle. He is called "the Human Top" in the story titles but just "the Top" within the body of the stories.

Bravelle appeared in a ten-page backstory ("The Origin of the Human Top") in the first (and only) edition of Red Raven Comics, cover-dated August 1940, with script and artwork by Dick Briefer. Bravelle's second appearance was in the backstory "The Red Terror" in Tough Kid Squad, cover-dated March 1942.

Bruce Bravelle was a test subject for a scientist who was trying to find a way to nourish the human body with electrical currents instead of food. In the middle of one of the tests, a bolt of lightning struck the castle in which the experiment was being conducted, causing an opposing magnetic flow and giving Bravelle the ability to spin around at superhuman speed when he crosses his wrists or is exposed to electricity. He can fly, drill his way through walls, and deflect bullets. He can operate underwater and travel at a speed of up to 250 miles per hour (400 km/h). His bullet-deflecting and wall-drilling powers are created by the intense whirlwind which he generates when spinning.

=== David Mitchell ===
David "Davy" Mitchell was a hero during World War II, and member of Kid Commandos. He had the power to spin like a top at super-speed.

During World War II, teenagers David "Davy" Mitchell and Gwenny Lou Sabuki, were present at a stateside battle in which sidekicks Bucky (Bucky Barnes) and Toro (Thomas Raymond) of the superhero team the Invaders fought the supervillain Agent Axis. During the battle, one of Gwenny's father's inventions accidentally gave Gwenny and Davy superhuman powers. She became Golden Girl, and he the Human Top. The four youthful heroes defeated Agent Axis, and later formed the Kid Commandos, who were allied with the adult Invaders.

In his later years as seen during the Secret Wars storyline, Davy moved into Valhalla Villas, a retirement community for Golden Age heroes and villains located in Miami. He and the rest of the retirees were temporarily de-aged and went back into action one last time before the collision between Earth-616 and Earth-1610.

== Human Torch ==
Human Torch is the name of several characters.

=== Relur ===
The Marvel 2099 reality had an Atlantean Human Torch named Relur.

==== Earth-906943 Relur ====
On Earth-906943, Relur is an Atlantean who fled to the surface world upon developing pyrokinesis and became the Atlantean version of Human Torch. He and Spider-Man 2099 were captured in the Arena Cell and worked together to get out.

==== Earth-2099 Relur ====
In the unified 2099 reality of Earth-2099, Relur is a member of the Avengers until he is killed by the Masters of Evil.

== Hump ==
Hump is a fictional mutant in the Marvel Comics Universe. His first appearance was in New Mutants #91 (July 1990).

Hump and his brother Brute were Morlocks with identical mutations who worked for Masque and accompanied him to confront Sabretooth but failed to kill him. They also tried to capture Feral but she escaped. When they tried to regain Feral from the New Mutants, Cable shot Brute dead causing Hump and Masque to take their leave.

Hump was with his revived brother when he and the Morlocks attacked the Reavers in Madripoor.

In the series Dark X-Men, Hump and Brute are among the Morlocks killed by an Orchis-controlled Archangel.

== Amber Hunt ==
- Further reading: Amber Hunt at the Comic Book DB (archived from the original)

Amber Hunt was an average American teenager in the Ultraverse before being exposed to the alien Theta Virus, which gave her pyrokinesis. Under the alias En Flame, she has been a team member of the Exiles and Ultraforce. Amber was created by Steve Gerber and R.R. Phipps and first appeared in Malibu Comics' Exiles #1 (August 1993).

== Hunter ==
The Hunter (Nina Smith) is a minor character within Marvel Comics. The character, created by Fiona Avery and Mark Brooks, first appeared in Amazing Fantasy (vol. 2) #3 (October 2004).

She is Anya Corazon's critically insensitive rival and Miguel Legar's girlfriend. Nina is a member of the Spider Society / WebCorps who has fought the Sisterhood of the Wasp.

Nina later becomes the true receptacle of Araña's exoskeleton, allowing her to be the Spider Society's Hunter.

=== Hunter in other media ===
A variation of the character renamed Maria Corazon appears in the Spider-Man episode "Generations", voiced by Valenzia Algarin. An amalgamation of Nina Smith, Maria Vasquez, and Lynn Sakura, this version is Anya Corazon's scientifically minded stepsister who is studying in South America for her Ph.D.

== Hunter in Darkness ==
Hunter in Darkness is a semi-legendary, bipedal, lupine creature native to the Canadian wilderness, first appearing in Wolverine (vol. 2) #34 (December 1990). This humanoid, wolf-like being is animalistic though somewhat intelligent, alternating between mindless aggression and calculated hunting behaviors, even at one point seemingly forming an "alliance" with Elsie-Dee, Albert, and Wolverine. Among the Blackfoot in Canada, the Hunter is known as a boogeyman and the subject of legends. Wolverine first encountered the creature in the Canadian wilderness after escaping from the Weapon X project in a mostly feral state, at which point Wolverine freed the Hunter from a bear trap. Wolverine reencountered the Hunter years later. The Hunter was at one point captured and put on display in New York City, but it later escaped and returned to Canada.

== Huntsman ==
Huntsman is the name of two characters appearing in American comic books published by Marvel Comics.

== Hurricane ==
Hurricane is the name of several characters in Marvel Comics.

=== Harry Kane ===
Hurricane (Harold "Harry" Kane), created by Stan Lee and Dick Ayers, was an enemy of the Two-Gun Kid. Originally the leader of a bandit gang defeated by the Kid, he gained superhuman speed from drinking an Indian shaman's potion.

=== Albert Potter ===
Hurricane (Albert Potter) is an enemy of Captain Britain and a former meteorologist. A weather experiment gave him weather and energy manipulating powers. He initially clashed with Captain Britain, but was defeated and incarcerated in Darkmoor Prison. Potter eventually reformed and emigrated to the United States.

=== Dark Riders version ===
Hurricane was a member of the second incarnation of the Dark Riders and a mutant with the power to summon powerful gusts of wind. Hurricane is impaled by adamantium shrapnel and killed during a failed attempt to rebond Wolverine's skeleton with adamantium.

=== Civil War version ===
A new Hurricane character was introduced in the Civil War: The Initiative one-shot. He has an inhuman resistance to damage and an unusual intellect which he used to design his own special "gear", which gives him superpowers. As an unregistered superhuman, he is confronted by the Thunderbolts.

== Hussar ==
- First appearance: The X-Men #137 (September 1980)
- Created by: Chris Claremont and John Byrne
- Species: Unidentified extraterrestrial race
- Teams: Imperial Guard
- Abilities: Bioelectricity generation

Hussar is a warrior serving in the Royal Elite of the Shi'ar Imperial Guard. She wields a whip that she uses to channel bioelectricity for offense. Hussar was created by Chris Claremont and John Byrne, first appeared in The Uncanny X-Men #137 (September 1980).

=== Hussar in other media ===
- Hussar makes non-speaking cameo appearances in X-Men: The Animated Series.
- Hussar appears as a mini-boss in Marvel: Ultimate Alliance, voiced by April Stewart.

== Ralph Hutchins ==
Ralph "Ralphie" Hutchins is a lab worker at UCLA. After receiving a sample of She-Hulk's blood, his boss uses it to make a superhero formula he injects Hutchins with. This turns Hutchins into a series of superhumans. Every time he is killed or beaten, he is resurrected as a new superhuman with new powers. His first transformation was called Brute, followed by Seeker, Radius, Torque, and Earth-Lord. In the final issue of the series, he is turned into an incorporeal being and leaves Earth.

== Hybrid ==
Hybrid is the name of two characters appearing in American comic books published by Marvel Comics.

== Hydron ==
Hydron is the name of several characters appearing in American comic books published by Marvel Comics.

== Hyperstorm ==
Hyperstorm (Jonathan Richards) is a mutant supervillain from an alternate future. The son of his reality's Franklin Richards and Rachel Summers, he possesses psionic powers and the ability to manipulate reality. He conquers most of his reality and attempts to extend his rule to other timelines. Hyperstorm was created by Tom DeFalco, Paul Ryan, and Danny Bulanadi, and first appeared in Fantastic Four #406 (November 1995).

== Hypnotia ==
Hypnotia (/hɪpˈnoʊʃə/) is a servant of the Mandarin who can control the minds of others, and was originally created by Ron Friedman for the Iron Man animated series. Her first appearance in comics was in the series' tie-in comic (November 1994). Hypnotia is voiced by Linda Holdahl in the first season and Jennifer Darling in the second season.
