= Marrow (character) =

- Marrow as depicted on the textless variant cover of Realm of X #1 (August 2023). Art by Karen S. Darboe.

Publication information
- Publisher: Marvel Comics
- First appearance: As Sarah: Cable #15 (September 1994); As Marrow: X-Men Prime (July 1995)
- Created by: Jeph Loeb (writer); David Brewer (artist)

In-story information
- Alter ego: Sarah (last name unknown)
- Species: Human mutant
- Team affiliations: Gene Nation; S.H.I.E.L.D. Weapon X Morlocks; X-Force; X-Men
- Notable aliases: Sarah Rushman
- Abilities: Superhuman strength, stamina, durability, agility, reflexes, and tracking; Controlled bone growth; Healing factor; Street fighting skills; Weapon proficiency

Sarah Marrow is a character appearing in American comic books published by Marvel Comics. Created by writer Jeph Loeb and artist David Brewer, the character first appeared in Cable #15 (September 1994). Marrow belongs to the subspecies of humans called mutants who are born with superhuman abilities. Marrow is able to rapidly grow and protrude her bones, which she can use as armor and weapons.

As a child, Sarah was taken in by the Morlocks, a band of grotesque-looking mutants who hid in tunnels beneath New York City. As a young adult, she formed the violent splinter cell Gene Nation until, under the orders of Morlock leader Callisto, she joined the X-Men to redeem herself. She made progress controlling her powers and learning a moral code, but eventually fell in with the paramilitary group Weapon X.

== Publication history ==
Sarah Marrow first appeared in Cable #15 (September 1994), created by writer Jeph Loeb and artist David Brewer. She first appeared as Marrow in the 1995 X-Men Prime one-shot. She appeared in the 2000 Spidey/Marrow one-shot, the 2006 X-Factor series, and the 2019 Marauders series.

== Fictional character biography ==
As a child, Sarah Marrow was one of the underground-dwelling Morlocks. During the Mutant Massacre that devastated the Morlock community, she witnessed the mauling of Angel by the Marauders. She was saved by Gambit, who was then not yet known by the X-Men. Years later, Sarah and most of the surviving Morlocks were actually brought to another dimension by Mikhail Rasputin. There, Rasputin had established a citadel for himself on the top of a massive hill. The Social Darwinist philosophy of "survival of the fittest" was the only thing which governed the society. Sarah eventually became the leader of Gene Nation, an anti-human terrorist group.

Within the alternate dimension, time passes faster than on Earth. When Marrow and several other members of Gene Nation return to Earth, they discover that only a few years had passed during their absence. Marrow and the other members of Gene Nation begin a homicidal terrorist campaign against surface-dwelling humans. After inconclusive battles with the X-Men and Generation X, Gene Nation is defeated by the X-Men. Marrow wires a time bomb to her own heart to force Storm. However, due to Marrow's possession of two hearts to compensate for her random bone growth and superhuman regenerative abilities, she survives.

After Callisto is injured by a Prime Sentinel, she directs Marrow to seek the aid of the X-Men. This leads to Marrow joining the X-Men for a time, where she is mentored by Wolverine. While with the X-Men, Marrow is given a device that gives her increased control over her powers, causing her to become kinder. Marrow left the X-Men during the six-month gap preceding the events of "Revolution".

Marrow is next seen brainwashed by S.H.I.E.L.D. under the alias of "Sarah Rushman", working as a sleeper agent. With Spider-Man's help, Marrow frees herself from S.H.I.E.L.D.'s control by faking her death.

=== Weapon X ===
Marrow is recruited by Weapon X, who again normalize her appearance and her powers. However, she eventually betrays Weapon X upon discovering their anti-mutant nature. She reforms Gene Nation and, as their leader, leads attacks on Weapon X until most of the group is killed by Agent Zero.

=== Decimation ===
Sally Floyd's article about Marrow.

Marrow is seen as a spokeswoman of a band of Morlocks after M-Day, when most mutants lost their powers. Marrow remains underground to protect and give hope to the few mutants who remain and those who fear going to the surface to live normal lives. X-Men editor Mike Marts confirmed that although Marrow retains the physical attributes of her mutation, her powers were lost during M-Day.

=== X-Cell ===
Marrow appears as a member of X-Cell, a terrorist group of former mutants who believe that M-Day was caused by the U.S. government. After Marrow and Callisto learn the truth behind M-Day, they turn against X-Cell supporter Quicksilver.

Marrow, pregnant at the time, undergoes a procedure that restores her powers at the cost of killing her unborn child.

=== Secret Empire ===
In the Secret Empire storyline, Marrow is affiliated with New Tian and fights along other mutants. Afterwards, Sarah joins Magneto's new Brotherhood of Mutants. She and others under his service attack an anti-mutant rally in Washington DC. Some time later, Marrow attends a self-help group therapy session for mutants who suffered from debilitating appearances due to their mutations.

=== Disassembled ===
After a massive reality distorting event caused by X-Man had left much of the mutant population decimated once again, Marrow and a couple of other mutants work with Emma Frost as debutantes in her new Hellfire Club. They are soon beset by the Office of National Emergency, now under command of Robert Callahan. Frost and Marrow contact the last remaining X-Men to deal with O*N*E.

=== Dawn of X ===
After Krakoa is established as a mutant nation, Professor X offers amnesty to all mutants in the form of an invite to Krakoa. Marrow is seen amongst an enclave of villainous mutants who accept his summons, becoming a citizen of Krakoa.

== Powers and abilities ==
Marrow possesses the ability to enhance the growth of her skeletal structure. She uses her power in many ways, including the creation of knuckle guards, spears, and projectile spikes. She also has a healing factor and enhanced immune system, much in the same vein as Wolverine since every time a bone is ripped out a wound which remains closes itself soon after. Her bones seem to be much more durable than normal; she had easily survived heavy hits in multiple areas of her body. Flag-Smasher hit her twice on the head with his mace without much damage, and Sabretooth likewise threw her against a wall without harm. Marrow also jumped off the Brooklyn Bridge twice (something that would have resulted in death or at least crippling injuries) without any major damage, being able to walk away from the scene. She possesses two hearts to compensate for her random bone growth as well, so when Storm ripped one out she was able to survive.

Marrow is also more agile and stronger than the average woman in her age group and physical condition, and has excellent tracking skills.

== Reception ==
=== Critical response ===
Darren Franich of Entertainment Weekly stated Marrow embodies "superhero body horror at its finest," saying Swiss artist Hans Ruedi Giger would have appreciated the character. Deirdre Kaye of Scary Mommy called Marrow a "role model" and a "truly heroic" female character. Amer Sawan of Comic Book Resources noted the similarities between the powers of Marrow and the newly acquired abilities of Captain Boomerang from DC Comics.

=== Impact ===
Marrow placed 8th in a popularity contest held by Marvel Comics in 2021, which served to determine who would be the final member of a new X-Men team that would debut during the Hellfire Gala storyline.

== Other versions ==
=== X-Men: Age of Apocalypse ===
An alternate universe version of Marrow from Earth-295 makes a cameo appearance in X-Men: Age of Apocalypse #2 as a member of the Morlocks.

=== House of M ===
An alternate universe version of Marrow from Earth-58163 appears in "House of M: Masters of Evil" #4 as a member of the Red Guard who is later killed by the Hood.

=== Age of X ===
An alternate universe version of Marrow from Earth-11326 appears in "Age of X: Universe" #1.

=== Ultimate X-Men ===
An alternate universe version of Marrow from Earth-1610 appears in Ultimate X-Men #47, in which she is killed by Mister Sinister.

== In other media ==
=== Television ===
- Marrow appears in Wolverine and the X-Men, voiced by Tara Strong. This version is a member of Charles Xavier's future X-Men who hails from a post-apocalyptic, Sentinel-controlled future.
- Marrow makes a cameo appearance in the X-Men '97 episode "Remember It" as a resident of Genosha who is later killed by Sentinels.

=== Film ===
Marrow makes a cameo appearance in Deadpool as a patient of an underground facility called the Workshop.

=== Video games ===
- Marrow appears as a playable character in Marvel vs. Capcom 2: New Age of Heroes, voiced by Susan Hart.
- Marrow makes a cameo appearance in Ultimate Marvel vs. Capcom 3.
- Marrow appears as a boss in X-Men Legends, voiced by Nancy Linari. This version is the leader of the Gene Nation.
- Marrow appears in Marvel Snap.

=== Merchandise ===
- In 1995, Toy Biz released a Marrow action figure as part of the "X-Men Generation X" line.
- In 2025, Hasbro released a Marrow figure in their "Marvel Legends" Line as part of the Nemesis Build-a-Figure wave.
