= Masque (comics) =

Marvel Comics supervillain

- Masque as depicted in Uncanny X-Men #489 (October 2007). Art by Salvador Larroca.

Publication information
- Publisher: Marvel Comics
- First appearance: Uncanny X-Men #169 (May 1983)
- Created by: Chris Claremont; Paul Smith

In-story information
- Species: Human mutant
- Team affiliations: Morlocks; Brotherhood of Mutants
- Abilities: Ability to alter the flesh and organs of living creatures

Masque is a supervillain appearing in American comic books published by Marvel Comics. Masque was originally a prominent member of the sewer-dwelling community of mutant outcasts called the Morlocks, led by Callisto.

== Publication history ==
Masque first appeared in Uncanny X-Men #169-170 (May–June 1983), and was created by Chris Claremont and Paul Smith.

Masque appeared as part of the "Morlocks" entry in The Official Handbook of the Marvel Universe Deluxe Edition #9, and the All-New Official Handbook of the Marvel Universe A-Z #7 (2006).

Masque appeared in Marauders #18 (2021) by Gerry Duggan, Stefano Caselli, and Matteo Lolli.

== Fictional character biography ==
Little is known about Masque's life, except that he was born with severe facial deformities, which led to him living the life as an outcast. This was furthered when Masque discovered that he was a mutant born with the ability to alter people's faces and bodies, reshaping them to whatever he wants. Masque's own body is immune to his powers. This cruel irony embittered Masque against the world and those whose beauty Masque envied and loathed. At some point, Masque was recruited by fellow mutant Callisto, who was seeking to create a new community for homeless and deformed mutants such as Masque and her allies. Masque uses his powers to make ordinary-looking recruits to the Morlock community look ugly to conform to Callisto's notions of the Morlocks being outcasts.

After Callisto is believed dead, Masque begins consolidating power among the Morlocks. He trains the Morlocks to act as his personal army and considers attacking humans on the surface. The war talk frightens the Morlock Feral, who flees the tunnels and seeks sanctuary with the New Mutants. Cable accepts her onto his team and when Masque comes with Brute and Hump calling to collect her, Cable kills Brute and given the warning that if he attacks Cable and his friends again, Cable will kill Masque. This causes Masque and Hump to leave.

Feeling humiliated by Cable, Masque and Feral's sister Thornn ally with Toad's Brotherhood of Mutants and launch an attack against Cable and the New Mutants (now called X-Force). The battle does not go well for Masque, as Shatterstar kills him with one of his swords.

Masque resurfaces in the series X-Treme X-Men. It is not said how Masque survived or faked his death, but both Storm and Callisto are not shocked to see him alive, nor are they shocked that he now possesses a new non-disfigured female form. Masque had gotten involved in the underground mutant gladiator circuit and had once again ensnarled Callisto, this time both enslaving her and giving her tentacled arms. Masque has his face mutilated by Callisto in retaliation for his actions.

During the Krakoan Age, Masque becomes a resident of Krakoa and uses his powers to perform plastic surgery. He and the Morlocks relocate to Madripoor, where they get into a fight with the Reavers.

== Powers and abilities ==
Masque using his flesh-shaping powers on Kitty Pryde. Art by John Romita Jr. and Dan Green.

Masque is a mutant with the ability to change the physical appearance of any other person by touch, manipulating it like clay. When the Morlocks formed, Masque's job was to use his powers on those Morlocks who were not "ugly enough" to be considered a true outcast by Callisto. Originally, it was stated that Masque could not use his powers on himself.

In the storyline "Storm: The Arena", Masque is revealed to have a secondary mutation that enables him to transform his own body.

== In other media ==
Masque makes non-speaking appearances in X-Men: The Animated Series.
