= Callisto (comics) =

Marvel Comics fictional character

- Callisto and the Morlocks by artist Jim Cheung

Publication information
- Publisher: Marvel Comics
- First appearance: The Uncanny X-Men #169 (May 1983)
- Created by: Chris Claremont (writer); Paul Smith (artist)

In-story information
- Alter ego: Unknown
- Species: Human mutant
- Team affiliations: Genoshan Excalibur; Gene Nation; Marauders; Morlocks
- Notable aliases: White Knight
- Abilities: Superhuman strength, durability, agility, senses, and reflexes; Regenerative healing; Tactical intuition; Adept at leadership and hunting; Combat proficiency; Multi-tendril limbs

Callisto is a superhero appearing in American comic books published by Marvel Comics. Created by writer Chris Claremont and artist Paul Smith, the character first appeared in The Uncanny X-Men #169 (May 1983). She belongs to a subspecies of humans known as mutants, who are born with superhuman abilities. She is also known under the codename White Knight.

Callisto was the leader of New York City's subterranean mutant settlement, the Morlocks, a group of mutants who are unable to assimilate into human society. However, she lost that position in a duel against Storm. The latter subsequently entrusted the group to Callisto as her representative. Although they once could not tolerate each other's presence, they have since developed a relationship based on mutual respect.

Since her original introduction in comics, the character has been featured in various other Marvel-licensed products, including films and animated television series. Callisto made her live-action debut in the 2006 film, X-Men: The Last Stand, portrayed by Dania Ramirez. She also appeared in the 2024 Marvel Cinematic Universe film Deadpool & Wolverine, portrayed by Chloe Kibble.

== Publication history ==
Callisto debuted in The Uncanny X-Men #169 (May 1983), created by Chris Claremont and Paul Smith. She appeared in the 2018 Uncanny X-Men series, the 2018 X-Men: The Wedding Special one-shot, and the 2019 Marauders series.

== Fictional character biography ==
Callisto's origins remain mysterious, though she asserts that the scars she bears serve as a testament to the folly of her attempt to live among ordinary humans. In one of her earlier appearances, her deepest psychological fear is the memory of the beautiful woman she once was.

=== Morlocks ===
Callisto takes up residence in an abandoned Cold War-era bomb shelter hidden within the sewers. Under untold circumstances, she meets Caliban, a mutant with the power to sense the presence of other mutants. She decides to make the bomb shelter a sanctuary for mutants like herself, using Caliban's power to track down such mutants. She calls this newly formed society the Morlocks, after the group of futuristic subterraneans known as Morlocks in The Time Machine by H. G. Wells. Callisto kidnaps Angel, intending to make him her mate. Kitty Pryde is struck with a deadly illness in an attempt to rescue him, and Callisto refuses to allow her companions to take her to the surface for medical treatment. To rescue Kitty, Storm challenges and beats Callisto in a duel for the leadership of the Morlocks. As the new leader of the Morlocks, Storm decrees that they would no longer kidnap and terrorize surface-dwellers, and in return they would have peace. The confrontation between Callisto and Storm leaves both parties consumed with hatred for each other.

Cover of The Uncanny X-Men #170. Art by Paul Smith.

Callisto attempts to take revenge on Storm by manipulating Kitty Pryde into marrying Caliban, but is foiled when Caliban releases Kitty from their betrothal. When the wizard Kulan Gath enslaves and ensorcells the city of New York and transforms it into a Hyborian Age city, Callisto becomes his warrior servant. She battles Storm again, but Storm saves her life. Callisto helps defeat Gath, and as a result Callisto and her allies find themselves on a new timeline where Gath never transformed New York.

Thereafter, Callisto becomes more of an ally to the X-Men. She rescues Professor X after he was nearly killed by an anti-mutant mob. She saves Power Pack from the Morlocks Annalee and Masque. Callisto is wounded during the Marauders' massacre of the Morlocks, and takes refuge with the X-Men. She convinces Storm not to give up leadership of the X-Men.

After a while, Callisto moves to Muir Island to become the bodyguard for Moira MacTaggert. With Moira, she is transported to an alternate Earth where Britain is dominated by Nazis. Meanwhile, the Nazi counterparts of Callisto and Moira appear on the mainstream Earth. These counterparts capture Brigadier Alistaire Stuart at the Tower of London, but fail in their attempt to escape the Tower of London. Both Callisto and Moira and their counterparts then return to their native Earths.

=== Being beautiful ===
Callisto later encounters an amnesiac Colossus, who has assumed the identity of artist Peter Nicholas. Peter remembers nothing of his former life after his journey through the Siege Perilous. The two become attracted to each other after Masque, who had taken control of the Morlocks in Callisto's absence, restores Callisto's beauty to greater than it was, only to take it away later as a means of tormenting her. The process is repeated several times before Callisto and Colossus are rescued by Forge, Banshee, and Jean Grey.

Callisto began a career as a fashion model and moved above ground, embarking on a new life with Peter Nicholas as her lover. They were attacked by Genoshan magistrates but defeated them. The Morlocks, under Masque's influence, attacked and nearly killed Callisto. The Morlocks' Healer treated Callisto's wounds, but accidentally restored Callisto's scars and her original physical deformities. Healer's powers were overloaded by the severity of her injuries, killing him in the process.

Callisto vowed revenge on her former followers for stealing away her looks, and then allied herself with Mikhail Rasputin, Colossus' older brother. Mikhail and Callisto appeared to have been killed when he used his powers over matter to flood the Morlock tunnels. Rasputin had actually transported the Morlocks into an alternate reality, where time moved more quickly than on Earth. There she watched as the Morlock youths grew up with great bitterness towards their elders for all that had happened to them.

When the young Morlocks, now calling themselves Gene Nation, returned to Earth with revenge planned, she went looking for help and located her former love Colossus, who had recently returned to Earth after the fall of Avalon. The two returned to the X-Mansion to warn the X-Men that Gene Nation was planning to kill innocents for every Morlock killed during the Mutant Massacre. Drawing Storm and Wolverine into the tunnels, she witnessed as Storm fought Marrow in a duel that saw the X-Man once more resort to lethal measures to win.

Callisto remained in the tunnels looking over Marrow until she was injured during the events of Operation: Zero Tolerance. Recovering from her wounds, she told Marrow to find a place amongst the X-Men, figuring it to be the best place for her. Callisto also has a maternal relationship with Marrow, acting as a mother-figure towards the young mutant, though the two are not biologically related, making her the only person Marrow would follow nearly blindly. After the six-month gap and Marrow's departure from the X-Men, Callisto disappeared.

Later, Callisto was once again transformed by Masque, having her arms reformed into tentacles. Callisto was also under Masque's control in "The Arena," an elite fight club in Japan. Callisto and Storm battled each other in the Arena, but later both escaped with help from Storm's friend, Yukio.

=== Genoshan Excalibur ===
She was one of the main characters in the 2004 Excalibur title, where she was helping Professor Xavier and Magneto rebuild Genosha. This alliance briefly reunited her with Archangel.

=== Son of M ===
In the aftermath of "House of M", Callisto is among the many mutants to have lost her powers during "Decimation". During the "Son of M" storyline, Quicksilver offers her Terrigen Mist, stolen from the Inhumans, as a way to restore her powers. Callisto willingly accepted the offer and the Mist effectively restored all her previous abilities, but without any control over them. Her new senses are so acute that even a drop of rain causes her tremendous pain; unable to handle it, she fell into a coma. The depowered Magneto found her body and showed it to Quicksilver saying that he poisoned her with the Terrigen Mist. He later took her body to a hospital, where the effects of the Mists wore off.

=== X-Cell ===
Callisto was later reunited with Marrow as members of X-Cell, a group of mutants who hold the government responsible for their power loss. When Quicksilver offered to repower its members, she warned Marrow about what happens to non-Inhumans who gain power from the Terrigen Mist. She and Marrow later fled into the sewers to escape the government.

=== Return to the sewers ===
At some point, Callisto returned to the sewers. She is later discovered by various teen and young adult runaways. She begins to care for them with a firm but caring hand. Storm stumbles upon this group while investigating the disappearance of one of the girls. Storm and Callisto fight, but when Storm sees the girl helping Callisto, she realizes that the girl is there by choice, and the hostilities cease. Storm helps them clean up. Before leaving, Storm offers Callisto to send regular help should they need it.

In the aftermath of Infinity, Terrigen Mist is released across Earth, infecting mutants who touch it with M-Pox. Callisto takes in numerous mutants who seek refuge underground, as well as some humans. As a way to live out the dream of Professor X, this unified society of humans and mutants resided together as the New Morlocks. The community was assaulted, however, when some Morlocks infected by a type of psi-vampirism attacked them while Monet and a morally inverted Sabretooth were in their territory to find the source of a new mutant sickness. The perpetrator of the underlife abductions was M's brother Emplate, who was suffering as much from the M-Pox epidemic as everyone else since it was killing off his only food supply. Callisto and Sabretooth attempted to fight him off and free the captured Morlocks, but they were incapacitated by Leech.

=== X-Men: Gold ===
Callisto was incarcerated at the Robert Kelly Correctional Facility (also known as The Box), a prison for mutants, despite not being a mutant anymore due to Decimation. She is seen acting as gofer to the other inmates. Her attempt to establish herself as the most dominant inmate failed against a burlier prisoner. She sends a warning to new inmates Kitty, Storm, and Rachel Summers that X-Men are being targeted. However, it was revealed to be a plan by Callisto to establish her authority.

After the three X-Men are released, news of Kitty Pryde's marriage to Colossus is made public. Callisto escapes prison to confront Kitty while she is celebrating at her bachelorette party. The two fight briefly, with Kitty mistaking Callisto's intention at another attempted kidnapping, but Callisto's intentions were in fact merely a threat to Kitty not to hurt Colossus.

=== Disassembled ===
Calamitous events which occur to the X-Men, and mutants are in dire straits. The Morlocks in Callisto's care again face genocide due to the tumult caused by their departure. Even after Chamber came down to care for them, Callisto's people still faced more bloodshed due to the chaos caused by the Office of National Emergency which was blamed on the resurgent Marauders. When the X-Men come searching for clues, Callisto is able to incapacitate Wolverine.

=== Dawn of X ===
With the grand announcement of the new mutant nation of Krakoa broadcast to the world during the "House of X and Powers of X" storyline, Callisto was one among many whom accepted sanctuary there alongside a host of other criminal mutant malcontents. She was also presided over the dead Xavier after he was fatally shot by one amongst a crew of homunculi who infiltrated Krakoa's defenses.

A couple days before the nation's leaders' death and resurrection, Callisto was called to the personal island quarters of Emma Frost to discuss a mutual partnership with the queen of the underground. The White Queen petitioning her to be Emma's White Knight in the Hellfire Trading Company both to foster trust amongst the mutant and human communities, due to her own overly persuasive nature, and the fact that high seas transport can be incredibly dangerous and her branch of the industry needs enforcers to manage the national interests of Krakoa.

Although a bit irked at Emma Frost for ignoring her for most of her life, Callisto decides on a temp occupation of the position until deciding on whether or not she feels comfortable with the gig. While still somewhat untrusting of the White Queen, Callisto admits to her treacherous lieutenant Masque that she's interested in what she's selling nonetheless.

After half a year working as Emma's paladin, she would meet up with members of the Red Queen's; Catherine Pryde's, crew on the Marauders at Island M to take and catalog their contraband while exchanging some swift and deadly albeit friendly parley with her old rival Ororo Munroe after they dock. While questioning why it was Lucas Bishop took so long to return to port, the latter wonders about the whereabouts of his leader and friend. To which the White Knight responds that she never returned from her voyage after what happened in Madripoor.

== Powers and abilities ==
Callisto possesses superhuman abilities, including enhanced senses, such as enhanced sight (with night vision), hearing, smell, taste, and touch. She exhibits superhuman strength, speed, and agility, along with advanced physical conditioning. Her mutant superpowers include a tactical brilliance, enabling her to determine the most effective strategies for engaging in conflicts. Callisto possesses exceptional hand-to-hand combat skills and is a skilled hunter and tracker. She excels in stealth operations when required and is typically armed with knives, demonstrating precise accuracy both in close combat and as throwing weapons. Furthermore, Callisto possesses natural abilities as a huntress, fighter, leader, and tactician, adept at devising intricate plans and strategies even without relying on her superhuman tactical perception.

== Reception ==
Sara Century of Syfy described the rivalry between Callisto and Storm as one of the most intricate and compelling in fiction. Callisto, as an ideal nemesis, was introduced to challenge Storm's moral complexities and deepen our understanding of her character. The conflict significantly contributed to Storm's transformation, marked by a shift from pacifism and a dramatic change in appearance often called her "punk" look. Century concluded that this period of struggle and eventual forgiveness of Callisto were crucial in helping Storm regain her inner stability and evolve into the hero she is today. Michael Johnson of Bam Smack Pow expressed interest in a television series that would explore Callisto's origin story and her leadership of the Morlocks.

== Other versions ==
=== Age of Apocalypse ===
An alternate universe version of Callisto from Earth-295 appears in Age of Apocalypse. This version is a pirate who is later killed by Mystique.

=== Cross Time Capers ===
An alternate universe version of Callisto from Earth-597 appears in Excalibur. This version is Moira MacTaggert's bodyguard.

=== House of M ===
An alternate universe version of Callisto from Earth-58163 appears in House of M. This version is the leader of the Marauders.

=== Mutant X ===
An alternate universe version of Callisto from Earth-1298 appears in Mutant X. This version is a relationship with Mole Man.

=== Ultimate Marvel ===
An alternate universe version of Callisto from Earth-1610 appears in the Ultimate Marvel universe.

== In other media ==
=== Television ===
- Callisto appears in X-Men: The Animated Series, voiced by Susan Roman.
  - Callisto appears in X-Men '97, voiced by Courtenay Taylor. Following the Morlocks' relocation to Genosha, Callisto becomes a member of the island's ruling council before she is later killed by Sentinels.
- Callisto appears in X-Men: Evolution, voiced by Saffron Henderson. This version is the even-tempered leader of the Morlocks.

=== Film ===
- Callisto appears in X-Men: The Last Stand, portrayed by Dania Ramirez. This version is the leader of the Omegas and an expert hand-to-hand combatant who possesses superhuman speed and the ability to sense other mutants' locations and their level of power. After joining forces with Magneto's Brotherhood to resist the development of a "mutant cure", she develops a rivalry with Storm, who later kills Callisto.
- Callisto makes a cameo appearance in Deadpool & Wolverine, portrayed by Chloe Kibble. This version works for Cassandra Nova.

=== Video games ===
Callisto appears in Marvel's Wolverine, portrayed by Debra Wilson. This version is the leader of the Morlocks.

=== Merchandise ===
Callisto received an action figure in Hasbro's Marvel Legends line.

=== Miscellaneous ===
- Callisto appears in the novelization of X-Men: The Last Stand. Unlike the film incarnation, this version is the leader of the Marauders before joining Magneto's Brotherhood of Mutants, does not possess super-speed, and is spared by Storm.
- Callisto is a supporting character in the 2023 X-Men Resistance version of Zombicide.
