= Morlocks (comics) =

Group of fictional characters in Marvel Comics

Publication information
- Publisher: Marvel Comics
- First appearance: The Uncanny X-Men #169 (May 1983)
- Created by: Chris Claremont; Paul Smith

In-story information
- Base(s): Formerly the Alley, New York sewer system Formerly the Hill Dimension; Selima Oasis, North Africa
- Member(s): Membership

The Morlocks are a group of mutant characters appearing in American comic books published by Marvel Comics. The characters are usually depicted as being associated with the X-Men in the Marvel Universe. Created by writer Chris Claremont and artist Paul Smith, they were named after the subterranean race of the same name in H. G. Wells' novel The Time Machine, but unlike in the novel, they are not a faceless, threatening mass of villains. They first appeared as a group in The Uncanny X-Men #169 (May 1983). Caliban appeared prior to that, but he was not yet a member of the Morlocks.

The Morlocks were depicted as an underground society (both literally and figuratively) of outcast mutants living as tunnel dwellers in the sewers, abandoned tunnels, and abandoned subway lines beneath New York City. They were composed of mutant misfits, especially those mutants who, because of physical mutations or other conspicuous manifestations of their mutant genetics, were unable to pass as human in normal society. Subjected to hate, fear, and disgust from human society due to their "deformed" appearances, dangerous mutations, or otherwise outcast or misfit statuses, most of the Morlocks viewed humans (and even other more mainstream mutants such as the X-Men) with distrust and anger, and they occasionally committed criminal or antisocial acts upon the above-ground human society.

Due to a series of tragedies, the original Morlocks no longer resided in subterranean New York City (except Marrow, who was one of the original Morlocks as a child). However, a violent splinter cell, Gene Nation, and a comparable group, called Those Who Live in Darkness, emerged in their absence. Similar groups, referred to as Morlocks by both readers and the X-Men, have appeared beneath Chicago and London. In the post-Krakoan Age, the Morlocks have returned to New York City, reclaiming their place in the underground tunnels.

== Fictional group history ==
According to Callisto, she formed the Morlocks by first recruiting Caliban. She then used his power to track down other mutants who were unable to integrate into normal society. The Morlocks initially squatted in a network of abandoned, interconnected tunnels beneath Manhattan, which had originally been built as Cold War bomb shelters and then forgotten, before expanding into sewers and abandoned subways. The Morlocks occasionally emerged to rob humans in Manhattan and would sometimes kidnap certain mutant children.

The X-Men were alerted to the existence of the Morlocks when their leader Callisto kidnapped Angel and intended to make him her mate. This brought Storm to challenge Callisto to a duel for leadership of the Morlocks. Victorious, Storm orders an end to their attacks on normal humans, but she does not assume leadership of the Morlocks full-time. Against her wishes, several Morlocks later kidnap the child superheroes Power Pack so that they could be raised by the Morlock Annalee, who had lost her own children. When Callisto discovers what was going on, she forces Annalee to let them go. They promise to return in the future to keep her company.

A majority of the Morlocks are killed by Mister Sinister's Marauders in the "Mutant Massacre". Most of the survivors join Gene Nation, having lived in a pocket dimension led by Mikhail Rasputin. Leech instead becomes a ward of Generation X. Other survivors include Erg and Beautiful Dreamer (whose whereabouts were unknown until "Decimation"), Thornn (who would join X-Corporation), and Caliban.

It is later revealed that many of the Morlocks were actually failed experiments of Dark Beast, although he made certain that they did not remember being tampered with, which is why Mister Sinister sought to destroy them.

A new group called the Tunnel Rats which also calls itself "Those Who Live in Darkness" have inhabited the sewer tunnels just below the surface of Mutant Town/District X. District X writer David Hine claims to never have intended this group to have any ties to the original Morlocks.

During the "Decimation" storyline, some of the remaining powered Morlocks seek asylum at the X-Mansion. Some Morlocks remain underground under Marrow's protection.

After Terrigen Mist is released across Earth and threatens the mutant population, many mutants seek refuge underground. In addition to these mutants, Callisto shows sympathy towards humans who sought refuge from the global landscape. This unified society of humans and mutants forms the New Morlocks.

When Krakoa is established as a mutant nation, several of the Morlocks begin living there, including Callisto, Caliban, Cybelle, Erg, a revived Healer, Leech, Masque, Marrow, Mole, a revived Piper, Skids, and a revived Tommy.

During the "Dawn of X" and "Reign of X" storylines, instead of relocating to Krakoa, some Morlocks went to a retirement and golf community in Rio Verde, Arizona (paid for by the Hellfire Trading Company) while others went to Lowtown in Madripoor. At one point in Madripoor, the Morlocks Bliss, a revived Brute, Hump, Masque, and Marrow fought the Reavers.

During the "Fall of X" storyline, following the "global attack on Krakoa" by Orchis, "the X-Men used the Morlock Tunnels as a temporary base".

In the post-Krakoan Age, the Morlocks have returned to New York City and maintain many Krakoan cultural practices while incorporating new practices, such as funerals. In the series NYX, Caliban attempts to persuade Anole to join the Morlocks.

== Membership ==
=== Founding members ===
Debuting along with the rest of the Morlocks (with the exception of Caliban) it was revealed that Masque, Caliban, Callisto and Sunder founded the Morlocks under the streets of Manhattan.

- Caliban - Caliban became Death, and later Pestilence. Served on X-Force for a time. Joined the X-Men after "Decimation". He was killed by the Purifiers saving James Proudstar, but was later resurrected on Krakoa.
- Callisto - The former leader of the Morlocks. She was depowered on M-Day, but regained her powers through The Crucible and Krakoan resurrection protocols.
- Dark Beast - An alternate universe version of Beast from the "Age of Apocalypse" timeline. Although not classed as a Morlock, he sees himself as their creator and has been called the "first one" by members of Gene Nation. He was recruited by Norman Osborn as scientist and member of Dark X-Men. Dark Beast later gains control over Clan Akkaba and returns to his own dimension.
- Masque - The former leader of the Morlocks following the "Mutant Massacre", Masque possesses the ability to transform others via physical contact. For a time, he led a splinter group called the Tunnelers.
- Sunder - Joined the impromptu Muir Island "X-Men" team. Killed by Pretty Boy of the Reavers.

=== Pre-Mutant Massacre ===
- Annalee - A Morlock and Leech's adoptive mother who can manipulate emotions. She is killed by Scalphunter in "Mutant Massacre".
- Ape - A Morlock who possesses an ape-like appearance and shapeshifting abilities. In Weapon X, Ape is captured and killed by Weapon X. Ape returned in Wolverine (2026).
- Beautiful Dreamer - Altered memories of those "recruited" as Morlocks. She was believed killed in "Mutant Massacre", but listed as alive and powered after "M-Day".
- Healer - A mutant whose healing powers only work on mutants. He burned himself out to heal and restore Callisto. Healer was later revived when Krakoa was established as a mutant nation.
- Erg - A Morlock who can absorb and redirect energy. Erg was a painter before becoming a Morlock. He was one of the 198. He later resurfaced as part of the mutant community on the living island Krakoa.
- Jo - Only appearance as a Morlock was her debut issue as Kitty Pryde's bridesmaid. Current whereabouts unknown.
- Leech - A young Morlock who can negate superpowers. He is currently a member of Future Foundation.
- Piper - Controlled animals using music. Killed by the Marauders. Years later, Piper is resurrected and becomes a resident of Krakoa.
- Plague - Became Pestilence, one of the Horsemen of Apocalypse. Died after falling off her flying horse.
- Skids - Resented because she was seen as the prettiest of the Morlocks (her force field protected her from scars and Masque's powers). She left them and became a ward of X-Factor. After "M-Day", she became a follower of Apocalypse and is friends with Scalphunter. Was part of Masque's new group of Morlock Extremists, as a spy for S.H.I.E.L.D.
- Storm - X-Man who defeated Callisto in a duel to become the Morlocks' leader, although not classified as a Morlock. Former Fantastic Four member and former Queen of Wakanda. Currently a member of the X-Men.
- Tar Baby - A Morlock who can generate a tar-like adhesive. In Weapon X, Tar Baby is captured and executed by Weapon X.
- Annalee's four children - Shot by Scalphunter.

=== Mutant Massacre ===
The "Mutant Massacre" was one of Marvel's annual crossover events, centering on the Morlocks. The event resulted in the Marauders killing many of the Morlocks under orders of Mister Sinister. Only a few survived, with the protection of the X-Men, X-Factor, Power Pack, and Thor. Many new Morlocks debuted, although many were killed in their first appearance.

- Berzerker - An mutant with electric abilities who was formerly part of Masque's splinter group, The Tunnelers. He was killed after accidentally electrocuting himself with his own powers.
- Blowhard - A wind-exhaling mutant who was formerly part of Masque's splinter group The Tunnelers. Shot by the Savage Wolf Gang leader.
- Cybelle - Acid-secreting Tunneler. Killed by Harpoon. Years later, Cybelle is resurrected on Krakoa.
- Scaleface - A former member of the Tunnelers who can transform into a reptilian creature. She was killed by the police.
- Tommy - A young girl capable of adopting a two-dimensional form. She is killed by Scalphunter after accidentally leading the Marauders to the entrance to the Morlocks' home. Tommy resurfaced years later as one of the many resurrected mutants on Krakoa.
- Zeek - Killed by Harpoon.

=== Post-Mutant Massacre ===
Most of the surviving Morlocks relocated themselves throughout New York City after the massacre. Few, however, returned to the Alley, their original home. There, Masque assumed leadership. Many new surviving Morlocks were introduced when Sabretooth decided to finish his original task. He is stopped by a newly "upgraded" Caliban. Later, a splinter group of the Morlocks is introduced. This group, led by Pixie, attempts to escape Masque.

- Alex - Alex is an amorphous, blob-like creature, able to engulf and smother others. Current whereabouts and status unknown.
- Bertram - Current whereabouts and status unknown.
- Bliss - Has the power of a poisonous bite. Was a part of Masque's new group of Morlock Extremists.
- Bouncer - Mass teleporter. Current whereabouts and status unknown.
- Brute - A green-skinned mutant with super-strength. Shot by Cable, resurrected by the Five and killed again by Archangel.
- Chickenwings - A mutant with bird-like features. Killed by Sabretooth.
- Ent - Superhuman strength. Current whereabouts and status unknown.
- Feral - Left the Morlocks. She was depowered as a result of "Decimation" but she regained her physical mutation, only to be killed by Sabretooth. Feral is later resurrected on Krakoa.
- Hump - Brute's brother with a similar appearance and super-strength. Killed by Archangel alongside Brute.
- Lightning Bug - Killed in the "Mutant Massacre". Lightning Bug's spirit survived and sought a new body, but later died.
- Mole - Could tunnel through solid matter. It is strongly implied that Mole was killed by Sabretooth. However, he survived by digging to safety and laid low until Krakoa was established as a mutant nation.
- Mother Inferior - Could communicate with rats, cockroaches, and other vermin. Crushed by falling debris.
- Pester - Daughter-in-law of Mother Inferior. Possesses superhuman speed and fangs. Current whereabouts and status unknown.
- Pixie - Led a splinter group of Morlocks on the run from Masque. Murdered by Blackout.
- Samson - A mutant with super-strength and infrared vision. Killed by Sabretooth.
- Thornn - Left the Morlocks after the Great Flood. Depowered as a result of "Decimation", but she regained her physical mutation. Later seen on Krakoa.

=== The Hill ===
With Masque presumed killed, an insane Mikhail Rasputin takes over as leader of the Morlocks in The Uncanny X-Men #293. He floods the tunnels, attempting to destroy the remaining Morlocks. It is revealed later that he actually transported the Morlocks to another dimension dubbed the Hill, whose timeline moved faster than the main Marvel Universe. There, he set himself up as their king and forced them to fight for the right to live.

- Brain Cell - A mutant with telepathy. Current whereabouts and status unknown.
- Marilou - Killed by Mikhail Rasputin.
- Marrow - One of the Morlocks who were transported to the Hill dimension by Mikhail Rasputin. Returned to lead a terrorist faction known as Gene Nation. Formerly of the X-Men, S.H.I.E.L.D., X-Cell and the Weapon X program.
- MeMe - Mind shut down by Jean Grey to rescue humans he absorbed with his lifeform fusion ability.
- Monte - A mutant with bio-electric blasts. Current whereabouts and status unknown.
- Mikhail Rasputin - Former leader of the Morlocks. Transported them to the Hill dimension. Banished himself to Kapalan.
- Sack - A mutant with possession ability.

=== Africa/Gene Nation ===
With the Morlocks presumed dead from the floods caused by Mikhail Rasputin, some of the remaining Morlocks were relocated to Selima Oasis in North Africa. When attacked by Humanity's Last Stand, an emotional backlash caused D'Gard to assume control over Storm, who relinquished her leadership role. In X-Men: Prime many of the Hill Morlocks returned to found Gene Nation. As the new group, they attacked the human oppressors of the past Morlocks under the leadership of Marrow. It is unknown whether the remaining Morlocks of Africa stayed there or relocated to New York. A few have been seen there since, as well as a few Morlocks who chose to remain in New York City despite previous attempts on their lives.

- Boost - One of the surviving Morlocks with power amplification abilities. Helped the Brotherhood of Mutants escape in exchange for being relocated to North Africa. Depowered.
- Carver - Leader of a splinter group of five Morlocks with super-strength and osteokinesis. He survived the Massacre and the Flood and who still followed the old Morlock rules.
- D'Gard - An empathic mutant who became leader of the Morlocks while in North Africa. He made Storm relinquish her leadership. Killed by Marrow as a sign of loyalty to the new Weapon X program.
- Fever Pitch - A mutant whose body is made of organic flames.
- Fugue - An animalistic member of the splinter group who possesses sharp claws and teeth and still follows the old Morlocks rule.
- Revelation - Revealed to have been in suspended animation around the time of Storm's becoming the Morlock leader as a result of her death-powers. Revelation is killed by a Skrull posing as Wolverine.
- Soteira - A mutant with unrevealed powers. Revealed to be around at the time Storm became Morlock leader. Was the scientist that put Revelation in suspended animation. Appeared as a hologram telling the Wolverine Skrull and the Punisher she will die as a result of prolonged exposure to Revelation's powers.
- Tether - A reptilian mutant with an electrified tail who is one of the surviving Morlocks. Helped the Brotherhood of Mutants escape in exchange for being relocated to North Africa. Depowered.
- Ever - Member of Gene Nation and later member of Havok's Brotherhood. His body was composed of brain matter, granting him telepathic abilities.
- Reverb - Member of Gene Nation. Can focus his mental powers psychometrically, conducting clairvoyance and psychic bursts through the walls and floor of his surroundings. Killed by Storm.
- Membrain - Member of Gene Nation. His body is composed of a mucous membrane, allowing him to liquify himself and flow at will. The mucous has psychic properties that allow him to view distant places and stun his opponents.
- Vessel - Member of Gene Nation. Can drain the physical and psychic residue released from the recently deceased, increasing his physical size, strength, endurance, and resistance to injury. Killed by Agent Zero.
- Integer - Member of Dark Beast's Gene Nation. Exists in a conceptual mathematical state, making him intangible and capable of scrambling the thought patterns of others.
- Iron Maiden - Member of Dark Beast's Gene Nation. Body composed of a razor sharp metallic material.
- Opsidian - Member of Dark Beast's Gene Nation. Exists in a state of pure Darkforce, which makes him intangible, invisible while in shadow, able to stretch in light, and allows him to cast a negative empathic effect over others.

=== After M-Day ===
After M-Day, Angel Dust, Boost, Callisto, Delphi, Irving, Marrow, Postman, Qwerty, Shatter, Tether, Feral, and Thornn lost their powers. Feral and Thornn later regained their physical mutations, but did not regain their powers. In one of Generation M's "Ex-Mutants' Diaries", Sally Floyd interviews Marrow about the Morlocks. Marrow reports that 80% of the remaining Morlocks lost their powers.

The former Morlocks who retained their powers sought refuge at Xavier's Institute and became known as the 198. They are Beautiful Dreamer, Caliban, Erg, Leech, and Skids.

=== The Extremists ===
During Ed Brubaker's "The Extremists" arc, the Morlocks reappear under the leadership of Masque and now consisting of Bliss, Erg, Litterbug, Skids, and a captured Leech. Later in this story, it was revealed Skids only joined the Morlocks to spy on them on behalf of S.H.I.E.L.D.

=== Morlocks appearing during the Decimation Era ===
Powered:

- Beautiful Dreamer - Killed by the Purifiers using the Legacy Virus.
- Bliss - A resident of Utopia.
- Joe Bugs - An insect-like mutant who was shown only in flashback. Killed by a clone of Kraven the Hunter called Xraven.
- Caliban - Killed by the Reavers during the events of Messiah Complex
- Erg - A resident of Utopia.
- Feral - Originally depowered on M-Day; her physical mutations were restored by Romulus for unknown reasons before she was killed by Sabretooth. She was revived in Peter David's X-Factor run in exchange for her spirit finding Wolfsbane. After Krakoa she was apparently killed again in the first issue of X-Factor volume V despite her healing factor.
- Fever Pitch - Killed by the Purifiers using the Legacy Virus.
- Leech - A member of the Future Foundation.
- Litterbug - A resident of Utopia.
- Masque - Whereabouts are unknown.
- Sack - Formerly a resident of Utopia; killed by a Nimrod Sentinel during the events of "Second Coming"
- Skids - An agent of S.H.I.E.L.D.

Depowered:

- Callisto - In the tunnels
- Marrow - A member of X-Force. She has had a simulacrum of her powers reactivated through technological means.
- Thornn - Her physical mutations were restored by Romulus.

Former leaders not involved with group:

- Dark Beast - The leader of Clan Akkaba.
- Mikhail Rasputin - Banished himself to Kapalan.
- Storm - Affiliated with the X-Men and the Jean Grey School of Higher Learning and Uncanny X-Force.

=== Krakoan Age and afterward ===
- Loolo - Originally from Arakko, Loolo relocated to Earth after the events of X-Men Red.
- Maggott - Maggott joined the Morlocks in the series Dark X-Men.
- Sobunar of the Depths - Originally from Arakko, Sobunar relocated to Earth after the events of X-Men Red.

== Other groups ==
There are other groups that are related to the main Morlocks group:

=== Chicago Morlocks ===
In June 2002, Marvel released a four-part limited series, Morlocks. In it, a small group of mutants living in the sewers of Chicago help each other to fulfill their one last wish on the surface while trying to escape the mutant-hunting Sentinels.

- Angel Dust - She ran away from home upon discovering she was a mutant, to protect her family from possible Sentinel attacks. Adrenaline gives her bursts of super-strength. Confirmed to be depowered by S.H.I.E.L.D.
- Cell - Robber and gang member whose body transformed into a giant, single-celled body capable of extending pseudopods and engulfing objects which then are digested. Executed by the Sentinels.
- Electric Eve - Former heroin addict and prostitute whose body produces massive amounts of electrical energy that can be extended outward in bolts of electricity. As a side-effect of her powers, the synapses in her brain short-out from time to time, incapacitating her for several minutes. Current whereabouts and status unknown.
- Litterbug - Former soldier who went AWOL upon his transformation into a giant, cockroach-like creature with massive strength, invulnerability, and a keen burrowing ability. He is a member of the New York Morlocks.
- Postman - Leader of the Chicago Morlocks. Can telepathically erase specific memories from targets (such as an event) or complex and deeply rooted facts or knowledge. Depowered.
- Shatter - His body is composed of crystal that can regenerate lost body parts over time, and also can crystallize liquids upon contact. Depowered.
- Trader - Former stockbroker who has a chameleon-like ability to camouflage into his surroundings. Killed taking a bullet meant for Electric Eve.

=== London Tunnel Dwellers ===
In The Uncanny X-Men #397–398, parts 3 and 4 of the Poptopia story, a group of Morlocks living in the tunnels of London are introduced. They were being pursued by an agent of the Church of Humanity named Mr. Clean, a genetically engineered human who was stalking and killing mutants. This was their only appearance. It is unknown whether or not they survived the persecution of the Church of Humanity.

- Burning Puddle - Son of Miss Saccharine. Sweats acid. Current whereabouts and status unknown.
- Carla - A mole-like woman. Current whereabouts and status unknown.
- Cyclops - A one-eyed mutant with super-strength who is not to be confused with the X-Men member of the same name. He died buying his fellow London Tunnel Dwellers some time to get away from Mr. Clean.
- Double Helix - A two-headed man. Current whereabouts and status unknown.
- Harmony - Mother of Hope who has gills. Current whereabouts and status unknown.
- Hope - Harmony's newborn baby. Current whereabouts and status unknown.
- Miss Saccharine - Elderly woman and mother of Burning Puddle whose sweat is a sugar-like substance. Current whereabouts and status unknown.

== Other versions ==
=== Age of Apocalypse ===
An alternate universe incarnation of the Morlocks from Earth-295 appear in Age of Apocalypse (2005), consisting of Feral, Leech, Marrow, Skids, Thornn, and Artemis.

=== Ultimate Marvel ===
An alternate universe incarnation of the Morlocks from Earth-1610 appear in the Ultimate Marvel imprint, consisting of Sunder, Caliban, Callisto, Sparks, Leech, Angel, and Nightcrawler.

== In other media ==
=== Television ===
- The Morlocks appear in X-Men: The Animated Series, initially led by Callisto and consisting of Annalee, Ape, Caliban, Erg, Glowworm, Leech, Masque, Mole, Marianna, Plague, Scaleface, Sunder, Tar Baby, and Tommy.
  - The Morlocks appear in X-Men '97, where they relocate to Genosha. In the episode "Remember It", Callisto, Leech, Ape, Erg, and Tommy are killed by the Wild Sentinel.
- The Morlocks appear in X-Men: Evolution, led by Callisto and consisting of Caliban, Cybelle, and Scaleface as well as series original characters Façade, a mutant boy with camouflage-based powers; Lucid, who possesses X-ray vision and is voiced by Lee Tockar; Torpid, a mute girl with a paralyzing touch; and Spyke, a former member of the X-Men.
- The Morlocks appear in The Gifted, led by Erg. This version of the group is a neutral faction who wish to live in peace.

=== Film ===
The Morlocks serve as loose inspiration for a group called the Omegas, who appear in X-Men: The Last Stand. Similarly to the Morlocks, the Omegas are led by Callisto. Additionally, Leech appears as an unaffiliated mutant.

=== Video games ===
- The Morlocks and the Gene Nation appear in X-Men Legends, with the latter led by Marrow and Healer as a prominent member of the former.
- The Morlocks appear in X-Men Legends II: Rise of Apocalypse, with the majority appearing as Apocalypse and Mister Sinister's brainwashed thralls and Marrow appearing as an ally of Moira MacTaggert.
- The Morlock Tunnels appear in Marvel Heroes.
- The Morlocks appear as non-playable characters (NPCs) in Marvel's Midnight Suns via the "Blood Storm" DLC.
- The Morlocks appear in Marvel's Wolverine, consisting of Callisto, Caliban, Leech, Lin Li / Nature Girl, Mortimer Toynbee / Toad, Sally Blevins / Skids, Poser, Annalee, and Jean Grey.

== Reception ==
The Morlocks were ranked #14 on a listing of Marvel Comics' monster characters in 2015 by Den of Geek.

Ashley Fields of Screen Rant highlighted that the pre-Krakoan Age Morlocks were outcasts with "strange or grotesque mutations", while the X-Men offered a mutant sanctuary that required combat training. She noted that Krakoa's sanctuary gave mutants a taste of "a different way of life", free from such demands, and in the post-Krakoan Age, it is the Morlocks who "offer a new kind of hope for mutants that the X-Men no longer capture" as it is "impossible" to live normally with the X-Men. She commented that while the Morlocks are still "the most easily identifiable as 'mutant'", the post-Krakoan Age Morlocks have "a sense of peace and pride that even mutants with less identifiable abilities long for. The group is building and carrying on a culture" that started in Krakoa. She opined that the Morlocks choose "to walk in the sun and inspire others like them to do the same" and "offer what the X-Men can't: unconditional acceptance and a life lived on every mutant's terms".
