= Feral (character) =

- Feral as depicted in Wolverine (vol. 3) #53 (June 2007). Art by Simone Bianchi.

Publication information
- Publisher: Marvel Comics
- First appearance: The New Mutants #99 (March 1991)
- Created by: Rob Liefeld; Fabian Nicieza

In-story information
- Alter ego: Maria Callasantos
- Species: Human mutant
- Team affiliations: X-Force; Morlocks; New Mutants; Mutant Liberation Front; New Hellions; X-Corporation; Hounds; X-Factor
- Abilities: Superhuman speed, agility, stamina, senses, and reflexes; Regenerative healing factor; Sharp claws and fangs; Prehensile tail

Feral (Maria Callasantos) is a character appearing in American comic books published by Marvel Comics. Created by Rob Liefeld and Fabian Nicieza, she first appeared in The New Mutants #99 (March 1991). Feral belongs to the subspecies of humans called mutants who are born with superhuman abilities. She has feline features and superhuman attributes and most often appears in the X-Men family of books. Feral has been both a protagonist and an antagonist at various points in her history. She is a founding member of X-Force and has also been affiliated with the Morlocks, the Mutant Liberation Front, and the New Hellions.

== Publication history ==
Feral debuted in The New Mutants #99 (March 1991), created by Rob Liefeld and Fabian Nicieza. She appeared regularly as a cast member in X-Force until she left the book in issue #28 (November 1993). The character would subsequently fall out of regular publication and made brief appearances in X-Force (1994, 1999), Quicksilver (1998), and New X-Men (2002). She played a supporting role in a 2007 storyline in Wolverine (vol. 3), during which she was killed. Feral was briefly revived during the 2009–2010 "Necrosha" event, but died again at the event's conclusion. Her ghost appeared in X-Factor #220–224 (August–October 2011).

Feral was resurrected during the 2019 "Dawn of X" publishing initiative and appeared sporadically in various X-Men titles published during the Krakoan Age. When X-Factor was relaunched in 2024 as part of the "From the Ashes" publishing initiative, she joined the main cast, but was seemingly killed in issue #1 (October 2024) along with several other team members.

== Fictional character biography ==
=== Origin ===
Maria Callasantos was born in New York City to Marcella Callasantos and an unnamed father. She is the second of four children, including her older sister Lucia, her younger brother Matteo, and her younger sister Carolina. Her father is abusive towards Marcella and abandons his family shortly after Carolina is born. He is later found dead of a drug overdose and Marcella blames the size of their family for driving him away. Maria, influenced by this, comes to blame her younger siblings for their father abandoning them. While Maria is babysitting Matteo and Carolina, Carolina falls down a flight of stairs and dies. It is left ambiguous as to whether Maria is involved in her sister's death. Later, Matteo trips and falls off of the roof of their tenement while chasing pigeons Maria keeps as pets. Maria witnesses this and it is implied that she did not try to help her brother as he hung from the building's ledge, killing him with her inaction.

As with most mutants, Lucia and Maria's mutations develop when they begin puberty, though Maria's develops more quickly than Lucia's. Both sisters gradually gain feline features, including fur and claws. Meanwhile, Marcella begins dating Henry Bellinger, an alcoholic and cocaine addict, and soon becomes addicted to cocaine herself. Henry makes frequent sexual advances towards Lucia and Maria and eventually attempts to rape Lucia, but Maria intervenes and kills him. In retaliation, Marcella kills Maria's pet pigeons, sending Maria into a murderous rage. She kills her mother and she and Lucia run away to the tunnels under the city, joining the Morlocks and taking the names Feral and Thornn respectively.

=== New Mutants and X-Force ===
Feral is introduced in The New Mutants during her attempt to escape from the despotic Masque, leader of the Morlocks. She seeks refuge with the New Mutants and warns them of Masque's plans to ignite a war with the surface, beginning with attacking their team. Cable fights off her pursuers and Feral agrees to join his new paramilitary group X-Force in return for protection. Feral joins the cast of X-Force as one of the team's founding members and helps defeat the Brotherhood of Evil Mutants when they ally with the Morlocks, dueling her sister Thornn. She appears in the 1992–1993 "X-Cutioner's Song" event, notably losing a fight with X-Factor member Wolfsbane.

During a mission to rescue Henry Peter Gyrich from the Mutant Liberation Front (M.L.F.), the M.L.F.'s leader, Reignfire, convinces Feral to leave X-Force and join him, preying on her resentment of Gyrich's anti-mutant bigotry. Feral serves as an operative of the M.L.F. until Thornn is arrested on suspicion of murdering their family and later rescued by X-Force from the anti-mutant group the Friends of Humanity. Learning of Thornn and Feral's troubled past, X-Force confront and subdue Feral, who is arrested and imprisoned for murdering her mother, her mother's boyfriend, and her siblings.

Escaping prison, Feral next appears in Quicksilver (1997–1998) as a member of a team of villainous mutants led by Pyro. She and her teammates have been infected with the Legacy Virus and are working for Exodus and the Acolytes in exchange for a cure. They fail in their mission and are left stranded in the Savage Land.

Later, Feral reappears in X-Force as part of the New Hellions, suffering both physically and mentally from the effects of the Legacy Virus. During a battle with X-Force, she slices Siryn's vocal chords and retreats with the remaining New Hellions when the fight turns in X-Force's favor.

=== X-Corporation ===
Feral is eventually cured of the Legacy Virus and joins the Mumbai branch of the X-Corporation with Thornn. Both of them lose their powers when the Scarlet Witch removes the powers of most mutants on Earth in the 2005 "House of M" event. X-Corporation subsequently disbands. She next appears in Wolverine (vol. 3), in which she and Thornn regain their feline appearances after experimentation by the mutant geneticist Romulus. Feral assists Wolverine in searching for Sabretooth, who later kills her in battle.

During the 2009–2010 "Necrosha" event, Feral is resurrected with the transmode virus by Selene and Eli Bard. Following Selene's death, Feral dies along with most of the resurrected mutants.

She later appears as a ghost in X-Factor and attempts to fight the pregnant Wolfsbane. In exchange for resurrection, her spirit serves as an anchor for the various gods and demons who want to use Wolfsbane's unborn Asgardian child for their own ends. Feral follows and torments Wolfsbane until she gives birth but ultimately remains dead.

=== Krakoan Age ===
During the Krakoan Age, Feral is resurrected by the Five and resides on Krakoa alongside other mutants, including her former X-Force teammates. She becomes Marrow's roommate and the two bond over their shared history with the Morlocks. She later helps Marrow investigate mutant disappearances in Madripoor and fight the anti-mutant organization Homines Verendi.

Feral is captured by the anti-mutant terrorist group Orchis during the fall of Krakoa and infected with Warlock's transmode virus, transforming her into one of Orchis' subservient techno-organic Hounds. She is later rescued by Creepy Crawler and cured of the virus.

=== From the Ashes ===
After the dissolution of the mutant nation on Krakoa, Feral joins X-Factor but is seemingly killed in a nuclear power plant meltdown during a mission.

== Powers and abilities ==
A mutant, Feral possesses superhuman and feline attributes. Her powers include superhuman speed, agility, stamina, senses, and reflexes. Her regenerative healing factor allows her to heal faster than a human. She has sharp claws, fangs, and a prehensile tail. She loses her powers after M-Day, but Romulus' genetic experiments later restore her feline appearance. Feral completely regains her powers after she is resurrected on Krakoa.

== Reception ==
=== Accolades ===
- In 2014, Entertainment Weekly ranked Feral 26th in their "Let's Rank Every X-Man Ever" list.
- In 2017, CinemaBlend included Feral in their "7 X-Force Members Who Should Appear In The Upcoming Movie" list.
- In 2019, Comic Book Resources ranked Feral 16th in their "X-Force: The Deadliest Members from Marvel’s X-Men Spinoff" list.
- In 2020, Scary Mommy included Feral in their "Looking For A Role Model? These 195+ Marvel Female Characters Are Truly Heroic" list.
- In 2022, Comic Book Resources ranked Feral 2nd in their " Scariest Members Of The New Mutants" list.

== Other versions ==
=== Age of Apocalypse ===
An alternate universe version of Feral appears in the "Age of Apocalypse" reality as a member of the Morlocks.

=== House of M ===
An alternate universe version of Feral appears in the "House of M" reality as a member of the Brotherhood's strike force.

=== Ultimate Marvel ===
An alternate version of Feral appears in the Ultimate Marvel imprint as a member of the Mutant Liberation Front.

=== X-Men '92 ===
An alternate universe version of Feral appears in X-Men '92. This version is part of a group of mutants called Rej-X. She later joins X-Force.

== In other media ==
=== Television ===
- Feral makes minor appearances in X-Men: The Animated Series. She is one of many mutants enslaved on Genosha and freed by the X-Men. An alternate version of Feral is later shown when Cable views the consequences of Bishop's time-travelling.
- Feral makes a non-speaking cameo appearance in Wolverine and the X-Men as one of the mutants escaping Genosha with Nightcrawler.

=== Miscellaneous ===
- Feral appears in the Wolverine versus Sabretooth motion comic, voiced by Kathleen Barr.
