= Age of Apocalypse (limited series) =

2005 comic book series

X-Men: Age of Apocalypse
- Cover to X-Men: Age of Apocalypse #1. featuring Weapon X and X-23; Art by Chris Bachalo

Publication information
- Publisher: Marvel Comics
- Schedule: Monthly
- Format: Limited series
- Genre: Superhero
- Publication date: May – June 2005
- No. of issues: 6
- Main character: X-Men

Creative team
- Written by: C. B. Cebulski
- Penciller: Chris Bachalo
- Inker(s): Tim Townsend (1-5); Jay Leisten (3-6); Jaime Mendoza (3-6); Mark Irwin (6); Victor Olazaba (6); Aaron Sowd (6); Al Vey (6)
- Letterer: Chris Eliopoulos
- Colorist: Studio F
- Editor: Mike Marts

Collected editions
- X-Men: The New Age of Apocalypse: ISBN 0-7851-1583-8

X-Men: Age of Apocalypse is a 2005 Marvel Comics six-issue limited series which takes place a year after the last story in the X-Men: Age of Apocalypse one-shot, with Magneto's X-Men helping North America recover from Apocalypse's rule. The series was written by C. B. Cebulski under the pen name Akira Yoshida and pencilled by Chris Bachalo; the first two issues were inked solely by Tim Townsend, with other helping out with the rest.

It undid many elements from the original Age of Apocalypse, and presented an America very similar to the one from the conventional Marvel Universe, despite the devastation wrought to the country (and world) in the original story.

== Plot synopsis ==
=== 1. Like Father... ===
In northern Canada, a cloaked figure kills three of Apocalypse's mutants with its adamantium claws. Magneto, Acting Director of Mutant Affairs, declares his responsibility for hunting down any surviving mutants who are allied with Apocalypse; he shows a press conference via live video feed from his team's raid on the Hellions. Magneto has also sent Kirika to track down Weapon X and bring him back to the team.

=== 2. Coming Up for Air ===
Magneto and his X-Men descend into the sewers to emancipate the Morlocks, but they resist violently. Thorn eviscerates Xorn (whose AoA counterpart is female), and Magneto orders Storm to end the fight. Her lightning storm hits Magneto as well, but Leech saps her powers, and Dana Moonstar (Danielle Moonstar's younger sister) takes Magneto's helmet and shows him his greatest fear: Mister Sinister holding a flaming Phoenix symbol. Storm knocks Leech out, and Silver Samurai calls for Nightcrawler to get Magneto and Xorn back to the mansion. X-23 relates her history to Weapon X, saying she might be his daughter, and an unknown figure calls a glowing unknown inside a holding tank "My angel." X-23 continues to ask Weapon X to rejoin Magneto. X-23 takes Weapon X to hunt down Northstar and Aurora, two of Apocalypse's Mutant Elite Force.

=== 3. Comebacks ===
The X-Men engage in a football game, and X-23's given name — Kirika — is revealed. She stops Silver Samurai and Weapon X from violently settling an old score. Cerebro detects the mutant signature of the Guthrie family in Washington, D.C. Cannonball and Amazon are there with their younger brother Icarus (recently discovered as a mutant in the mainstream universe). While the field team (Storm, Silver Samurai, Dazzler, Nightcrawler, Weapon X, and Kirika) fight the Guthries, Xorn attacks Rogue in the Monitor Room. The Guthries leave the battle to help the wounded Amazon, so the X-Men return to the mansion, which has been smashed. They find Paige Guthrie, thought to be dead, holding little Charles hostage, blaming them for leaving her to die in the Seattle Core. The other Guthries blast through the wall.

=== 4. Betrayal ===
Paige tells the X-Men how she was left to die in the Seattle Core with the rest of Generation Next, until her siblings found her. The X-Men delay, knowing Charles's life is in danger, while Psylocke drops down from above to pull Charles to safety. As the X-Men charge into battle, the roof tears off, and Sunfire and an irate Magneto have arrived. As Amazon grows to attack them, Sunfire fries her. Icarus and Cannonball try to flee, but Magneto wraps them in a metal sphere and crushes it into a torso-sized lump. Rogue stops Quicksilver from killing Husk, telling her that she will rot in a cell for the rest of her life. Paige husks her skin, exposing a stone spike, but Kirika stabs her. With her dying gasps, Paige tells Magneto that Mister Sinister wants his "deal" honoured. Magneto admits that he didn't stop the bombs; Jean Grey did, and that she's still alive in Sinister's clutches.

=== 5. Sinister ===
Weapon X forces Magneto to come clean; he says that he saw the flaming phoenix emblem in the flash of light when the bombs stopped, and decided to accept that the world saw him as its saviour. However, Mister Sinister came to him, and Magneto realized that he knew the truth as well. Sinister had taken Jean's body from the grave Magneto had put it in, but he told Magneto to leave him alone, or else the truth would come out, that the man the world believed saved everyone had done nothing. Weapon X takes a scent off of Husk's body and deduces that Sinister is in New York City. He also smashes Magneto's helmet, telling him that he has to stop hiding behind his mask if he wants people to trust him. Sinister had set up in one of his old labs, but when the X-Men investigate, Cloak teleports them outside, where Sinister and his "Sinister Six" await them. Sinister states that his plans are not about genetics and genocide, and tells Weapon X that Jean Grey is alive and well, and introduces her as a member of his Sinister Six (five of the Sinister Six appear on-panel): Cloak, Dagger, Sonique, Soaron, and Phoenix.

=== 6. Chrysalis ===
The X-Men confront Sinister's Six, and Magneto demands to know why Sinister did what he did. Sinister responds by telling him that he sought Mutant Alpha, whose genetic code gave rise to all mutants, and he believes that Jean Grey has the powers of Mutant Alpha. He commands his Six to destroy the X-Men. The last of the Six appears on-panel; a mutant who is apparently Blob from X-Men Alpha, who can now actively manipulate his personal gravity field to create energy waves. Samurai knocks out Sonique, Cloak swallows Nightcrawler, Dazzler, and Gambit within his dark dimension. Psylocke fights Dagger until Magneto drops a pile of debris on her, and Storm forces Cloak to spit out Dazzler and Nightcrawler. Quicksilver saves Magneto from Soaron at the cost of his own life. Magneto takes up Samurai's sword and kills Soaron. Sunfire and Phoenix battle with their own mutant flames, and Weapon X tries to reach out to Jean. When she falters, Nightcrawler teleports Psylocke behind her, and she stabs her in the head with her psychic knife. Magneto orders Weapon X and Kirika to finish Sinister off. Nightcrawler was unable to rescue Gambit from Cloak's darkness, and Jean admits to being responsible for organizing the Sinister Six. Kirika asks Psylocke to use her knife on her, and unlocks her memories; she is the actual daughter of Weapon X and Mariko Yashida. Magneto turns himself in, admitting that he lied about saving the world. Jean talks to him in prison about how hard they worked to redeem themselves in the humans' eyes. Kirika, Sunfire, Psylocke and Silver Samurai leave for the colony of New Japan, while the rest of the X-Men continue to follow the dream.

== Collected editions ==
The series has been collected into a trade paperback:

- X-Men: The New Age of Apocalypse (Marvel Comics, July 20, 2005, ISBN 0-7851-1583-8)
