= X-Men Legends =

2004 video game

- North American cover art
- Developer: Raven Software (Note: Ported to N-Gage by Barking Lizards Technologies.)
- Publisher: Activision
- Directors: Robert Gee; Patrick J. Lipo
- Producer: Michael Crowns
- Designer: Tom Odell
- Programmer: Daniel Edwards
- Artist: Brian Pelletier
- Writer: Robert Love
- Composer: Rik Schaffer
- Engine: Vicarious Visions Alchemy
- Platforms: GameCube; PlayStation 2; Xbox; N-Gage
- Release: GameCube, PlayStation 2, Xbox: NA: September 21, 2004; PAL: October 22, 2004; JP: January 27, 2005 (Xbox only); N-Gage: PAL: January 2005; NA: February 7, 2005
- Genre: Action role-playing
- Modes: Single-player, multiplayer

X-Men Legends is an action role-playing video game developed by Raven Software and published by Activision. It was released on the GameCube, PlayStation 2 and Xbox consoles in 2004. Barking Lizards Technologies developed the N-Gage port of the game, which was released in early 2005. Players can play as one of fifteen X-Men characters, with the ability to switch between four computer- or human-controlled characters at any time.

X-Men Legends follows Alison Crestmere, a young mutant who has the ability to summon and control volcanic activity. As Alison is taught to control her powers at the X-Mansion, the X-Men are sent on several missions. Eventually the X-Men learn of Magneto's plan to cover the Earth in darkness from his base on Asteroid M.

X-Men Legends received generally positive reviews from critics. The Xbox version was the best received, garnering aggregate scores of 83% and 82/100 on the review aggregating websites GameRankings and Metacritic respectively. Reviewers praised Raven's variation on cel-shaded graphics. Due to the success of the game a sequel was made, X-Men Legends II: Rise of Apocalypse.

== Gameplay ==
X-Men Legends awards players for using their mutant powers against an enemy simultaneously, known as a combo. This concept would later evolve into "Fusions" in Marvel Ultimate Alliance 2.

X-Men Legends is an action role-playing game. Players choose a team of up to four characters from a larger group of X-Men. As players proceed through the game, additional X-Men are unlocked. On the console versions, up to four players can play in the cooperative campaign, with the ability to add or remove players at any time. Cooperative play features a refined combat system and the ability to interact with non-player characters. The game also features a skirmish mode, which allows players to fight against each other or against waves of computer-controlled enemies.

As characters gain experience points, players can upgrade their four main powers and other abilities unique to that character. Items found during gameplay can also be equipped to further enhance a character's abilities. Characters can combine attacks to create a combo, in which two or more players use their mutant powers on a single enemy at the same time. The characters' special abilities can be used to create a "Super Combo" when combined with an "Xtreme Power" which become available at level 15.

The X-Mansion serves as a hub that the team returns to after each mission. While at the mansion, one player controls Alison Crestmere as she explores and learns about herself and the other X-Men. Here players can also view loading screen art, cinematics, and comic book covers acquired during gameplay. Biographies of the X-Men and their enemies can be accessed on computers located in the mansion. Players can participate in an X-Men trivia game, which rewards experience points for correct answers. Additionally, players can access the Danger Room's computer to play challenge missions unlocked during gameplay.

The players have two vendors available to them: Forge, who sells equipment and the Morlock Healer, who provides health and energy packs as well as training disks for use in the Danger Room. Forge becomes available after Alison contacts him accidentally from the X-Mansion, and Healer can be accessed following the third mission.

The N-Gage version of X-Men Legends contains most of the features found on the console versions. However, the game is played from an isometric point of view. Characters are two-dimensional sprites based on their three-dimensional console counterparts, and levels are redesigned to meet the limitations of the isometric point of view. Cutscenes were reused from the console versions, but are rendered at a much lower frame rate. Players can link with other N-Gage systems for four-player cooperative gameplay using GSM cellular technology.

== Plot ==
X-Men Legends is not set in any particular Marvel Comics universe. It is played from the perspective of a teenage girl named Alison Crestmere, a mutant with the ability to control volcanic activity. At the start of the game, Alison is abducted by the Genetic Research and Security Organization (GRSO). As GRSO soldiers take her away, Mystique arrives with Blob and takes Alison from the soldiers. She is in turn rescued from Mystique and Blob by the X-Men Wolverine and Cyclops, who take her to the Xavier Institute to explore her powers.

As Alison trains, the X-Men investigate an Alaskan research facility being attacked by the Brotherhood of Mutants, then rescue Gambit from the Morlocks.

They then try to stop the Brotherhood from rescuing Magneto from captivity aboard the U.S.S. Arbiter, a submersible aircraft carrier. Mystique is able to penetrate the defenses and free Magneto, and the ensuing damage caused by the Brotherhood leaves the X-Men to rescue several Arbiter crew members.

With Alison's training complete, she takes the codename Magma. The X-Men travel to Russia to help Colossus prevent the Brotherhood from obtaining weapons-grade plutonium from a nuclear power plant. After the team defends the X-Mansion from GRSO infiltrators, Cyclops goes alone to investigate the old Weapon X facility in Canada, where Wolverine had been experimented on before joining the X-Men. There, Cyclops meets his younger brother, Havok. Havok reveals that he has joined the Brotherhood and was involved in the attack on the nuclear power plant. Wolverine, who arrives at the facility on his own, stops the brothers from fighting each other. Together, they work to rescue the mutants that are held captive at the facility.

After accomplishing these missions, the team discovers that Colossus's sister, Illyana, is in a coma from a psychic hold placed on her by the Shadow King. The Shadow King reveals that he is aiding the leader of the anti-mutant movement, General William Kincaid. Professor X, Emma Frost, and Jean Grey enter the Astral Plane to save Illyana. They succeed, but Xavier is captured by the Shadow King in the process.

After Xavier's capture, the X-Men learn that General Kincaid is building upgraded variants of the mutant-hunting Sentinels. Magneto travels to his base on Asteroid M, where he reveals his plan to cover the Earth in asteroids to darken the surface. Havok tries to fight back but is imprisoned. The X-Men must prioritize their resources on three separate missions: rescuing mutants from Sentinels in New York, stopping Juggernaut's rampage on Muir Island, and protecting the Morlocks from a GRSO invasion. Afterwards, the X-Men free Xavier, who defeats the Shadow King in a psychic battle.

The X-Men travel to Asteroid M, where they rescue Havok and defeat Magneto in a final battle. After an attack by Sentinels, the X-Men discover that the asteroid is on a collision course with Earth. In the control room of the asteroid, they fight the General Kincaid as he pilots Master Mold, a larger and more powerful prototype Sentinel. After defeating General Kincaid, the X-Men locate the Gravitron, the control mechanism of the asteroid. The Brotherhood's initial plan was to use Magma to control the device if Magneto couldn't be rescued due to her ability to manipulate rocks in a similar fashion to magnetism. Magma uses her powers to steer the asteroid back into space.

The X-Men's victory on Asteroid M is watched by Apocalypse, who makes his upcoming plot from his base.

In the game's epilogue, a television news anchor reports that Magneto is still at large and that General Kincaid has been arrested for crimes against humanity. The game ends with the President of the United States thanking the X-Men for their service.

=== Playable characters ===
- Beast
- Colossus
- Cyclops
- Emma Frost (Note: Does not appear in mobile version.)
- Gambit
- Iceman
- Jean Grey
- Jubilee
- Magma
- Nightcrawler
- Professor X (Note: Only playable during sections of the Astral Plane missions. Not playable in mobile version.)
- Psylocke
- Rogue
- Storm
- Wolverine

== Development ==
It was basically Final Fantasy with X-Men. Over time, however, it really started to evolve. As development moved along, we added more and more elements of action and combat to it.

One thing that remained a consistent mantra through development of the game over the last few years has been the team. To be able to bring something like this to the X-Men universe was very important to us. Even when moved to action, we went into it with the idea that you are controlling a team.

— Co-project lead Patrick Lipo on the development of the game

X-Men Legends was announced in a press release by Activision on April 23, 2003. The game is Raven Software's first console title; after a number of successful titles for personal computers, it wanted to expand into the console market. The company developed the three console versions simultaneously, and used Vicarious Visions' Alchemy engine as a base for the game. After deciding to make an "X-Men RPG", staff began brainstorming story, gameplay and design ideas. Raven wanted to feature a team-based dynamic, something it felt was absent in previous X-Men games. The original concept featured turned-based gameplay, similar to a Final Fantasy game. However, the team concluded that players would prefer more action that allowed control of the character's super powers. The genre switch proved problematic to maintaining the team aspect of gameplay.

The group experimented with several gameplay models, and opted for one that allowed players to freely switch characters. The final product mimics isometric dungeon crawling video games. Raven designed gameplay with strategy in mind; each character's abilities allow different interactions with the environment and other characters. For example, a physically strong character like Colossus can break walls but is unable to reach certain areas that require the ability to fly, and Iceman is able to freeze enemies so that other characters can easily defeat them. Staff hoped that the differences would force players to switch characters regularly during missions. Extraction points, specific locations that players can switch characters, were added to allow players to continue without a game over in the event one or more team member was defeated. Raven included flash back missions as an homage to the franchise and based some on specific comic book issues. Originally a single-player game, Raven eventually incorporated simultaneous co-operative gameplay. The developers chose to not create an online multi-player mode, stating that the gameplay was "designed around localized encounters".

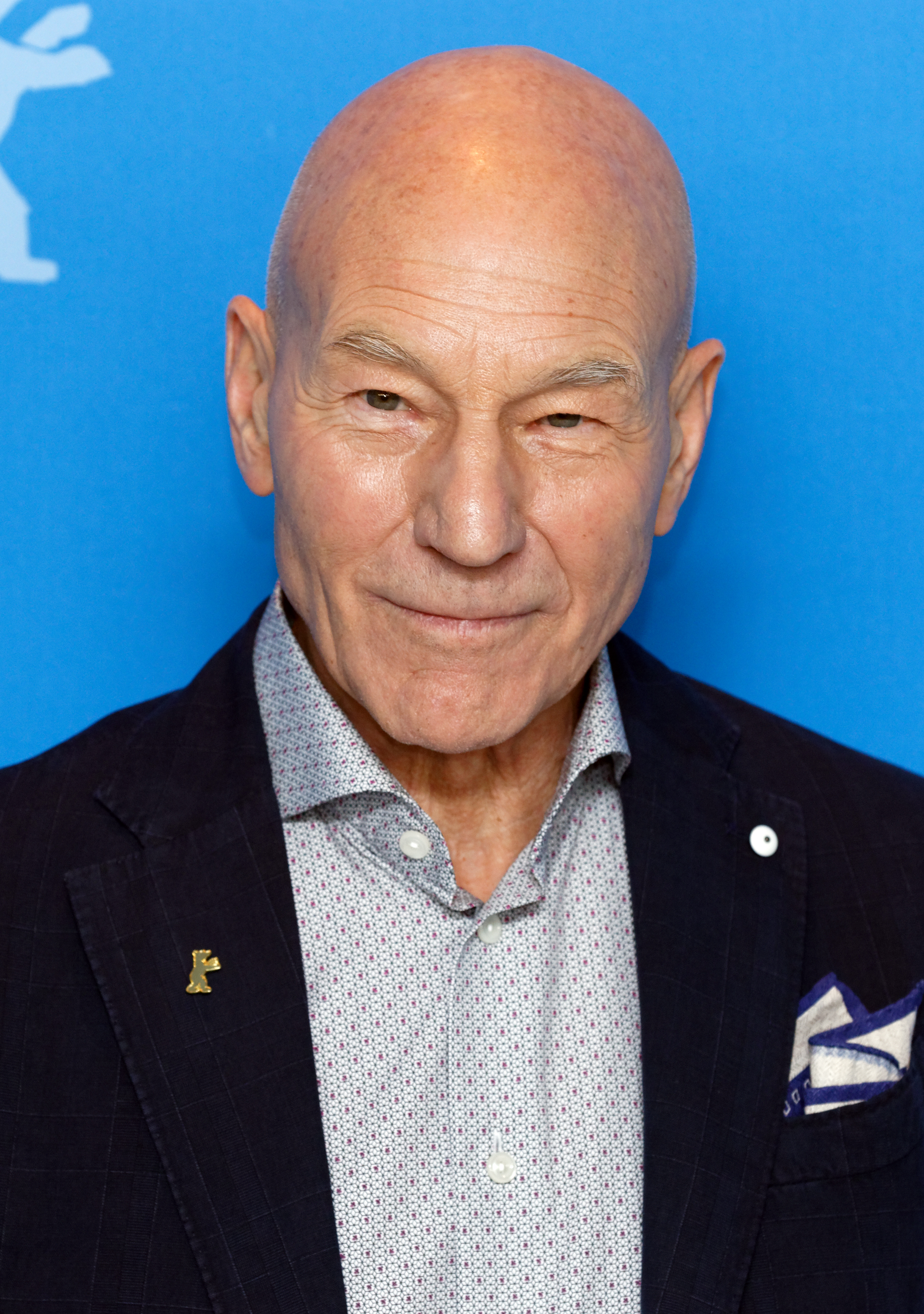
Patrick Stewart provided the voice acting for Professor X, a role that he also portrayed in the X-Men films.

The game's story was penned by a group of former Marvel writers known as Man of Action, consisting of Duncan Rouleau, Joe Casey, Joe Kelly, and Steven T. Seagle, with Stan Lee consulting. Man of Action chose the character Magma as their lead because she was an "appropriately blank slate as a character". Man of Action also stated that the script for X-Men Legends was in excess of five hundred pages. The writers created a story that would allow for players to change their active team throughout the game and not affect the overall flow of the story.

The game's voice cast consists largely of television and film stars as well as veteran voice actors. Patrick Stewart reprised his role as Professor Xavier from the X-Men films, while Tony Jay voiced Magneto. Ed Asner lent his voice as Healer, a Morlock shaman. Lou Diamond Phillips voiced Forge, a Native American mutant whose power grants him intuitive talent for inventing mechanical devices. Danica McKellar voiced Jubilee, a young mutant who generates plasmoids from her fingertips. Veteran voice actors Steven Blum, Grey DeLisle, Dee Bradley Baker, Robin Atkin Downes and Dorian Harewood also lent voices as Wolverine, Mystique, Nightcrawler, Cyclops and Shadow King, respectively. Music for the game was composed by Rik Schaffer of the Los Angeles-based Womb Music.

Characters were selected from different time lines in the X-Men universe. Art lead Brian Pelletier said that they took the most memorable characters from the last 40 years and grouped them together. X-Men Legends uses cel shading to give the characters a comic-like appearance. However, Raven cited that they opted for then-high resolution textures to stay away from "cartoony looking" characters. The process was accomplished by creating a second copy of the model, inverting the normals, then increasing the size of the model slightly. Character costumes were inspired by Marvel Comics' Ultimate X-Men, but some of the X-Men playable in X-Men Legends had not appeared in the comics at the time of its release so, with permission from Marvel, Raven created unique looks for those characters. During development Raven tried visual formats for the X-Men, including using their New X-Men uniforms as well as removing the cel-shaded look from the characters. In contrast, the back stories, relationships and personalities of the X-Men were taken from Marvel's mainstream universe. Angel was also to be included in the game, and was to be voiced by André Sogliuzzo, but was cut from the final build.

The game's marketing budget was $5 million.

== Reception ==
Reception

Aggregate scores
Aggregator	Score			
Aggregator	GameCube	N-Gage	PS2	Xbox
GameRankings	81.98%	76.13%	80.50%	83.36%
Metacritic	81/100	79/100	79/100	82/100

Review scores
Publication	Score			
Publication	GameCube	N-Gage	PS2	Xbox
Eurogamer				7/10
Game Informer	9/10	7/10	9/10	9/10
GamePro	4.5/5		4.5/5	4.5/5
GameSpot	8.2/10	8.1/10	8.2/10	8.2/10
GameSpy	4.5/5	4.5/5	4.5/5	4.5/5
IGN	8.4/10	8.3/10	8.4/10	8.4/10
Nintendo Power	4.1/5			
Detroit Free Press	3/4			
The Sydney Morning Herald	4/5		4/5	4/5

X-Men Legends received mostly positive reviews, with the Xbox version receiving the highest aggregate scores of 83.36% at GameRankings and 82/100 at Metacritic. The GameCube version was rated next highest, scoring 81.98% at GameRankings and 81/100 at Metacritic. Though the PlayStation 2 version received the lowest scores of the console versions, it still fared well, scoring 80.50% at GameRankings and 79/100 at Metacritic. The N-Gage version garnered scores similar to its console counterparts, receiving 76.13% and 79/100 at GameRankings and Metacritic, respectively. During the 8th Annual Interactive Achievement Awards, the Academy of Interactive Arts & Sciences nominated X-Men Legends for "Console Role-Playing Game of the Year". In 2011, GamePro retrospectively listed "the melee combat, ability to customize your stats, and multiplayer" among the strong points of X-Men Legends, adding that the game "was so successful that it created a well-received sequel and paved the way for the Marvel Ultimate Alliance series".

Critics generally praised the game's use of cel-shading. IGN's Hilary Goldstein stated, "to capture the 'comic book feel', Raven Soft chose to go for a cel-shaded look with Legends. It's not that the characters look two-dimensional, but they have very basic textures and a cut-out look". GameSpot reviewer Jeff Gerstmann pointed out that though the characters are cel-shaded, the environments are not, making them easy to distinguish. The gameplay was lauded for its role-playing elements, character powers and melee combat. Eurogamer praised the Xbox version's control system for character powers and melee attacks, as well as the "fluid" combat.

Reviewers found that the artificial intelligence (AI) was lacking, and recommended the game's multiplayer. Opinions were generally mixed on the subject of voice acting. X-Play reviewer Russ Fischer called it "purely average", though he made an exception for Patrick Stewart's portrayal of Professor Xavier. IGN noted that while some voice acting fit the characters well, others seemed out of place.

The N-Gage version was praised for the ability to play cooperatively using the N-Gage's bluetooth technology. Reviewers also found that the game's graphics were "very strong" and that "everything looks amazing". The presence of voice acting in the N-Gage port was also praised, with GameSpy reviewer Justin Leeper stating the audio clips seemed to be "lifted right out of other versions". He criticized the AI, however, for being "[a] bit stupid at inopportune times" and for failing to use the game's healing abilities at important moments.

== Sequel and similar games ==
X-Men Legends sold enough copies to be inducted into the budget lines for all three consoles on which it was released: PlayStation 2's Greatest Hits, GameCube's Player's Choice, and Xbox's Platinum Hits. By July 2006, the Xbox version of X-Men Legends had sold 800,000 copies and earned $28 million in the United States. Next Generation ranked it as the 74th highest-selling game launched for the PlayStation 2, Xbox or GameCube between January 2000 and July 2006 in that country. Combined sales of the Legends series reached 2 million units in the United States by July 2006.

A sequel, X-Men Legends II: Rise of Apocalypse was released for all major platforms in the fall of 2005, and the N-Gage later that year. Barking Lizards again helped port the game, this time to mobile phone devices. Vicarious Visions ported the game to the PlayStation Portable (PSP), and Beenox developed the PC port.

The success of the X-Men Legends series led Raven Software, Marvel, and Activision to create the video game Marvel: Ultimate Alliance, which was released on several consoles, handheld devices and the PC in 2006. Barking Lizards, Vicarious Visions and Beenox handled the ports for different platforms. Marvel: Ultimate Alliance was followed by Marvel: Ultimate Alliance 2, jointly developed by Vicarious Visions, n-Space and Savage Entertainment. Marvel Ultimate Alliance 2 was released on several consoles and handhelds in the fall of 2009. Vicarious Visions developed the PS3 and Xbox 360 versions, while n-Space developed the Nintendo DS, PS2 and Wii versions. Savage Entertainment ported the version developed by n-Space to the PSP.
