= Mikhail Rasputin =

Marvel Comics supervillain

- Mikhail Rasputin from The Uncanny X-Men #374. Art by Tom Raney.

Publication information
- Publisher: Marvel Comics
- First appearance: The Uncanny X-Men #285 (February 1992)
- Created by: Chris Claremont (Writer); Dave Cockrum (Artist)

In-story information
- Alter ego: Mikhail Nikolaievitch Rasputin
- Species: Human mutant
- Team affiliations: Russian Cosmonaut program Morlocks; Gene Nation; The Twelve
- Abilities: Matter manipulation on the sub-atomic level Superhuman strength Energy blasts Portal Creation

Mikhail Nikolaievitch Rasputin is a character appearing in American comic books published by Marvel Comics. He is the older brother of Colossus of the X-Men and Magik of the New Mutants and first appeared in Uncanny X-Men #285 (February 1992).

Mikhail is a mutant with substance-altering and dimension-hopping abilities. He was a Cosmonaut and the Russian Federal Space Agency tried to test his powers by sending him on a suicide mission. He was the only surviving member of his crew and returned to Earth mentally unbalanced, harboring a dangerous messiah complex.

He sometimes collaborates with other villains such as Callisto, Omega Red, Apocalypse, and Mister Sinister.

== Fictional character biography ==
The older brother of both Magik and Colossus, Mikhail was a Soviet cosmonaut and was believed dead after a faulty mission where his space shuttle exploded. It is later revealed that the explosion was set up by the government, who learned of Mikhail's powers and wanted to exploit them without him being encumbered by ties to the past.

Mikhail was sent by his superiors into an inter-dimensional void, counting on his powers to keep him and his comrades safe, to see what was on the other side. Mikhail is the only survivor of the crew. He discovers another world and marries Tra-Mai-A-Zath, daughter of the world's ruler, the Worldly Avatar. Mikhail becomes involved in a civil war, during which the dimensional rift that he entered through is opened. He closes the rift, but the ensuing blast kills hundreds of people, including his wife.

With help from the X-Men, Mikhail returns to Earth. However, he struggles to adjust and begins hearing and seeing visions of his dead companions and loved ones. He escapes from the X-Mansion and flees into the nearby tunnels, where he becomes leader of the Morlocks. After a battle with the X-Men, Mikhail floods the Morlocks' tunnels and is presumed dead.

Mikhail is later revealed to have survived in another dimension along with Callisto and a group of Morlocks. They formed Gene Nation, a group based on survival of the fittest. Mikhail established a citadel for himself on the top of a massive hill. If someone could reach the summit of the hill, they were considered "fit" and worthy of being part of Gene Nation. After capturing Storm, Mikhail is forced to return her and the Gene Nationals to Earth. Storm takes the Gene Nationals to a village in Africa where they can make a new life for themselves. It is revealed that Mikhail was working for Dark Beast to try to propagate a group of elite warriors.

=== Legacy Virus ===
Distraught by the death of his younger sister Illyana from the Legacy Virus, Mikhail attempts to save her past self by deliberately infecting her with the virus, intending for her to build an immunity. It is later revealed that Mikhail also had the virus and was trying to cure himself. His plan backfires and Illyana dies, with Mikhail having inadvertently caused her death.

=== The Twelve ===
When Professor X temporarily disbands the X-Men, Colossus takes Marrow with him to Boston to see an art expo. Mikhail transports them both to the Hill, where Colossus meets him for the first time since his supposed death. Colossus and Marrow end up freeing Mikhail from the corrupting influence of a sentient energy native to that dimension and bring him back to the X-Mansion to recuperate. Shortly afterward, the X-Men become embroiled in the gathering of the Twelve. Mikhail is one of the Twelve, and one of the Horsemen breaches the mansion's security to kidnap him. Colossus joins a strike force of X-Men who travel to Egypt in order to confront Apocalypse. In the ensuing battle, Mikhail sacrifices himself to carry the Horsemen away from the conflict in a dimensional gateway.

=== Colossus: Bloodline ===
Mikhail reappears, having allied with Mister Sinister to assassinate all of the members of the Rasputin family but one, so that the spirit of their forefather Grigory Rasputin can be reincarnated in the last remaining member of the lineage. Mikhail teleports himself and his brother to another dimension. Not wanting to physically kill his brother, he decides to leave him in the dimension, where he will die in a matter of weeks. Having separated from Sinister, Mikhail overcome his mental manipulations and rescues his brother. He decides to seclude himself in the Dark Zone, a world in which he cannot die or escape.

=== Krakoa ===
During the Krakoan Age, Mikhail works alongside XENO, an organization intent on destroying Krakoa. Mikhail uses the mutant Chronicler to manipulate Colossus into weakening the Krakoan state. However, Colossus manages to escape Chronicler's mind control and kills Mikhail.

== Powers and abilities ==
Mikhail Rasputin possesses vast energy-manipulating abilities. His role as a cosmonaut was to use his powers to protect the crew and vessel from the energies of the void they were investigating on Sakhalin Island. Whilst in the world he had entered through the void, he attempted to close it to protect both Earth and the other world; 'a source of energy that paralleled the void' was required, and Mikhail served 'in lieu of that powerful source', which indicates he could wield considerable energy. When the portal between the two worlds was later opened, and the X-Men came to Mikhail's world, he served as the focal point of the atomic power of Sunfire, the control of low temperature of Iceman, and the telekinetic fields of Jean Grey, wielding 'the untold energies of a thousand thousand stars' (sic). On his return to Earth, the traumatized Mikhail was shown to possess warping powers that could affect more than just energy, lashing out at a man delivering pizza and turning him into a tree, apparently killing him. Still wielding the inter-dimensional energies to which he was exposed traversing the void, Mikhail retained the ability to move between dimensions. His apparent atomic or molecular control manifested in the ability to imbue inanimate objects with a degree of life; in his psychosis believing himself to be a god, Mikhail sought to animate a portrait of his deceased sister Illyana, but was dissuaded by Colossus.

== Other versions ==
=== Age of Apocalypse ===
An alternate universe version of Mikhail Rasputin from Earth-295 appears in "Age of Apocalypse". This version is a former opponent of Apocalypse who was captured, brainwashed, and forced to serve him. Rasputin becomes a Prelate, member of the Horsemen of Apocalypse, and ruler of the central United States. Rasputin later loses his sanity, isolates himself, and gives himself metallic skin. When Rasputin returns, Apocalypse places him in charge of his Eurasian lands.

Rasputin later abandons North America and approaches the Human High Council with an offering of peace, which he does not intend to fulfill. He attempts to assume control of Europe using Empath's ability to manipulate emotions. Rasputin is stopped by Donald Blake, who sacrifices himself to kill him.

The Age of Apocalypse version of Rasputin is said to be able to "command energy and force fields." He is able to manipulate the substance of matter on a subatomic level and warp energy wavelengths, allowing him to fire destructive blasts and teleport through space and dimensions.

=== Amalgam Comics ===
Alexi Rasputin, a composite character based on Mikhail Rasputin and DC Comics character Douglas Nolan, appears in the Amalgam Comics one-shot X-Patrol.

=== Mini Marvels ===
An alternate universe version of Mikhail Rasputin from Earth-99062 appears in Mini Marvels. This version lives in Russia with his siblings.

=== Secret Wars ===
An alternate universe version of Mikhail Rasputin appears in "Secret Wars". This version is from the Domain of Apocalypse, a domain of Battleworld. He is a prelate, akin to his "Age of Apocalypse" counterpart, and possesses the metallic skin of Colossus.

=== Ultimate Marvel ===
An alternate universe version of Mikhail Rasputin from Earth-1610 appears in Ultimate X-Men #18. This version is a young civilian.

=== Ultimate Universe ===
An alternate universe version of Mikhail Rasputin from Earth-6160 appears in Ultimate Wolverine. This version is a member of the Rasputin family, which rules the Eurasian Republic. He later fakes his death and secretly joins the Opposition, a rebellion against the Rasputin family.

== Reception ==
Mikhail Rasputin was ranked 4th strongest comicbook character related to Colossus by ScreenRant.

== In other media ==
Mikhail Rasputin appears as a boss in X-Men Legends II: Rise of Apocalypse, voiced by Scott MacDonald. This version is a member of the Horsemen of Apocalypse whose design is based on that of his "Age of Apocalypse" counterpart. Additionally, he possesses the ability to produce energy blasts, self-duplication, superhuman speed, and the ability to bring inanimate objects to life.
