= Bibliography of Apocalypse =

Below is a complete list of detailed appearances by the Marvel Comics character Apocalypse.

== Comic books ==
=== Significant stories ===
==== 1980s ====
X-Factor Annual #3 (1988): Apocalypse battles the High Evolutionary; X-Factor in the background. Cover art by Walter Simonson.

- X-Factor (vol. 1) #4 (Mentioned as "The Master")
- X-Factor (vol. 1) #5-6 (First appearance; commanded the Alliance of Evil, first clashed with X-Factor)
- X-Factor (vol. 1) #10 (Recruits a Morlock, Plague, to become Pestilence)
- X-Factor (vol. 1) #11 (Recruits the mutant Abraham Kieros to become War)
- X-Factor (vol. 1) #12 (Recruits the mutant Autumn Rolfson to become Famine)
- X-Factor (vol. 1) #15 (cameo)
- X-Factor (vol. 1) #17 (Plans to give Angel new wings and make him into his Horseman Death)
- X-Factor (vol. 1) #18 (Angel agrees to become Apocalypse's Horseman)
- X-Factor (vol. 1) #19 (The introduction of the Four Horsemen)
- X-Factor (vol. 1) #24-26 ("Fall of the Mutants;" Apocalypse's Horsemen attack New York, are opposed by X-Factor, recruits Caliban)
- X-Factor (vol. 1) #28 (Vs Apocalypse's Ship)
- X-Factor Annual (vol. 1) #3 (Battles the High Evolutionary)
- Wolverine: Jungle Adventure (Wolverine battles an Apocalypse robot in the Savage Land)
- X-Factor (vol. 1) #50 (Battles Loki, refuses to join his "Acts of Vengeance")
- Classic X-Men (vol. 1) #25 (Flashback; granted superhuman powers to Moses Magnum)

==== 1990s ====
- X-Factor (vol. 1) #65-67 (Causes Ship to attack New York. His Dark Riders captures Nathan Summers)
- X-Factor (vol. 1) #68 (Infects Nathan with a techno-organic virus. Apocalypse is defeated on the moon)
- X-Men (vol. 2) #14 (The "X-Cutioner's Song"; is prematurely awoken from his hibernation process by the Dark Riders)
- Uncanny X-Men (vol. 1) #295 (Fights the X-Men)
- X-Factor (vol. 1) #85 (Goes to Cable's hideout)
- X-Men (vol. 2) #15 (Is once again prematurely awoken from his hibernation process, this time by Stryfe)
- X-Force (vol. 1) #17 (Is defeated by Stryfe. Joins forces with the X-Men)
- Uncanny X-Men (vol. 1) #296 (Recovers from his confrontation with Stryfe. Offers to save Charles Xavier)
- X-Factor (vol. 1) #86 (Cures Xavier of the techno-organic virus)
- X-Men (vol. 2) #16 (Attacks Stryfe's base on the moon with the X-Men. Fights his Dark Riders)
- X-Force (vol. 1) #18 (Final chapter of the "X-Cutioner's Song"; Seemingly dies at the moon)
- X-Force (vol. 1) #37 (Flashback; strikes down Saul and enters a Celestial ship in the 12th century)
- Uncanny X-Men (vol. 2) #335 (Onslaught saga; is revived)
- Cable (vol. 2) #35 (Onslaught saga; attempts to free Franklin Richards from Onslaught with Cable)
- Rise of Apocalypse #1-4 (His origin is told)
- Black Knight: Exodus (Transforms Exodus in the 12th century)
- The Further Adventures of Cyclops and Phoenix #1-4 (Transforms Nathaniel Essex into Mister Sinister during the 19th century)
- The Incredible Hulk (vol. 2) #455-457 (Transforms Hulk into his Horseman War)
- Cable (vol. 2) #53 (Releases Caliban and Ozymandias from his possession)

==== 2000s ====
- New Eternals: Apocalypse Now (Battles the Eternals)
- Uncanny X-Men (vol. 2) #377 (Apocalypse: The Twelve saga; Captures the remaining mutants part of the Twelve)
- X-Men (vol. 2) #97 (The Twelve saga; merges with Cyclops)
- Uncanny X-Men (vol. 2) #378 (Ages of Apocalypse; warps reality)
- Cable (vol. 2) #77 (Ages of Apocalypse; warps reality)
- X-Men (vol. 2) #98 (Ages of Apocalypse; warps reality)
- X-Men: Search for Cyclops #1-4 (Assumes control over Cyclops; essence is destroyed by Cable)
- Cable & Deadpool #26-27 (Pre-Blood of Apocalypse; resurrects back to life thanks to Cable)
- X-Men (vol. 2) #181-186 (Blood of Apocalypse; attempts to destroy 90% of humanity's population; is taken away by the Celestials)
- X-Men: Apocalypse vs. Dracula #1-4 (Flashback; battles Dracula)
