= List of Marvel Comics characters: P =

== Doctor Paine ==
Dr. Thaddeus Paine is a character appearing in American comic books published by Marvel Comics. The character, created by Len Kaminski, first appeared in Morbius the Living Vampire #4 (December 1994). He is a sadist who was unable to feel pain and has prosthesic hands equipped with surgical tools. Paine is a silent partner of Dr. David Langford who was threatened, resulting in the deaths of Martine Bancroft and his business partner. Paine then experiments on Morbius much like his inhumane medical experiments on the homeless, resulting in the Living Vampire vengefully destroying his facility while the doctor escaped. Paine next tortured Eddie Brock and experimented on the Venom symbiote, resulting in both individuals as Venom getting revenge by imbalancing his brain.

=== Doctor Paine in other media ===
Teddy Paine appears in Venom: The Last Dance, portrayed by Juno Temple. This version is a scientist for the government organization Imperium alongside Sadie Christmas, and later bonded to the Agony symbiote.

== Panda-Mania ==
Panda-Mania is a supervillain appearing in American comic books published by Marvel Comics. She was created by Dan Slott and Humberto Ramos, and first appeared in Amazing Spider-Man (vol. 3) #1 (April 2014).

Panda-Mania is an unnamed female with super-strength who wears a panda-themed outfit. She is a member of White Rabbit's animal-themed group Menagerie, and has fought Spider-Man on numerous occasions.

=== Panda-Mania in other media ===
Panda-Mania appears in the Spider-Man episode "Bring on the Bad Guys", voiced by Teala Dunn.

== Pandapool ==
Pandapool is an anthropomorphic giant panda version of Deadpool from Earth-51315 and a member of the Deadpool Corps.

== Paper Doll ==
Paper Doll (Piper Dali) is a character appearing in American comic books published by Marvel Comics. She first appeared in Amazing Spider-Man #559 and was created by Dan Slott and Marcos Martín in 2008.

Piper Dali is the daughter of the scientist Kenneth Dali. After being exposed to her father's "dimensional compressor", Piper acquired the ability to turn two-dimensional and paper-like. She was an obsessive fan and later stalker of actor Bobby Carr and used her powers to kill those she felt caused problems for him. Paper Doll was eventually defeated by Spider-Man.

=== Powers and abilities of Paper Doll ===
Paper Doll can stretch and bend her body into a paper-like form that is difficult to injure. The edges of her body are razor sharp and can cut through even Spider-Man's webs. Her powers also allows her to flatten others.

== Paradox ==
Paradox is a magical construct created by Doctor Strange and a member of the Midnight Sons.

=== Paradox in other media ===
Paradox makes a non-speaking appearance in the Spider-Man episode "The Cellar" as an inmate of the eponymous prison.

== Parker family ==
=== Benjy Parker ===
Benjamin Richard Parker (often called Benjy by his sister) is a character appearing in American comic books published by Marvel Comics. The character is from the alternate future MC2 universe, and is the younger brother of Mayday Parker / Spider-Girl, and son of Mary Jane Watson and Peter Parker / Spider-Man.

Benjamin was born after a complicated pregnancy. Because of his father's artificially altered genetic code, Ben was at a high risk of being born with some kind of genetic abnormality: deformity, disability, or perhaps even mutant powers. Due to the risk to Mary Jane's health, her obstetrician advised her to consider abortion. However, remembering that she faced similar risks when pregnant with her daughter May, Mary Jane decided to proceed with the pregnancy. Ben was born while his sister fought Seth, and to his family's relief, was apparently a perfectly healthy, normal little boy. He was named Benjamin in honor of his uncle Ben Reilly and great-uncle Ben Parker, while his second name, Richard, is in honor of his grandfather Richard Parker.

Benjamin seems to display some superhuman abilities. He is able to balance a block toy while simultaneously spinning his arm quickly. He is also seen dangling the block from his finger on a web-like string. May discovers Ben crawling on the ceiling of their home. Ben is briefly possessed by a miniature version of the Carnage symbiote, which accelerates the development of his powers.

In the storyline Spider-Verse, Benjy's family is attacked by Daemos, a relation of the 616 Spider-Man's former nemesis Morlun. During the attack, Mary Jane, Mayday's boyfriend Wes, and Peter are apparently all killed and their home destroyed. Mayday flees with Ben and is rescued by visiting Spider-Men from other dimensions. It is revealed that Ben is part of a prophecy that will help bring about the downfall of the Inheritors, alongside Kaine and Silk.

=== Teresa Parker ===
Teresa Parker (also addressed as Teresa Durand) is a character appearing in American comic books published by Marvel Comics. The character first appeared in The Amazing Spider-Man: Family Business #1 (April 2014). She is the long lost younger sister of Peter Parker / Spider-Man and daughter of Richard and Mary Parker.

After their parents' deaths, Peter was sent to live with their Aunt May and Uncle Ben while Teresa, whose birth had been kept a secret, was adopted. Many years later, Teresa was personally recruited into the C.I.A. by Nick Fury. Teresa first came into Peter's life after saving the latter from several mysterious gunmen sent by the Kingpin. Following this adventure, Teresa left the C.I.A. to join a S.H.I.E.L.D. division called the Gray Blade under Nick Fury Jr., specializing in international hostage rescues and intel gathering, before becoming a fugitive after learning of a program named "Project Twilight", an exhaustive plan to take down both superheroes and supervillains. After deleting all traces of the project from Gray Blade's systems and hiding the only known backup in nanobots in her bloodstream, Teresa sought Peter's assistance in confronting the Kingpin once again, who was involved in the operation. Later on, she helped Spider-Man stop an attack by the Vulture. Since Teresa had been spotted by Gray Blade operatives with Spider-Man, they arrested Peter himself due to his alter-ego being supposedly a bodyguard. When Peter then attempts to get Teresa out of New York, they are attacked by numerous criminals sent by the Tinkerer, ahead of an alien armada. After traveling to the past of an alternate timeline, to retrieve information to stop the coming invasion, Teresa joined Peter in this journey, contacting Fury and confirming that she was in fact the Parkers' daughter and Peter's sister.

== Pathway ==
Pathway (Laura Dean) is a character appearing in American comic books published by Marvel Comics. She first appeared in Alpha Flight #48 (July 1987), and was created by Bill Mantlo and Jim Lee.

Laura Dean's parents were mutant-phobic and decided to abort Laura's twin fetus because it was a mutant. While still a fetus, Laura protected her twin sister by using her mutant abilities to send her to another dimension, dubbed "Liveworld".

Laura grew up withdrawn from the world. In an attempt to cure her, her parents sent her to the New Life Clinic, which was actually run by the villain Scramble. Laura managed to escape but was later caught by Bedlam and forced to become a member of his team of Derangers. During the clash with Alpha Flight, Laura swapped places with her twin, whom she had named Goblyn, in Liveworld. After Alpha Flight defeated Bedlam, Goblyn and Laura were admitted into Beta Flight under the misbelief that they were the same person.

== Perun ==
Perun (Valeri Sovloyev) is a character appearing in American comic books published by Marvel Comics. He first appeared in Captain America #352 (April 1989) and was created by Mark Gruenwald and Kieron Dwyer.

Perun is a Russian superhero who serves in Russia's government-sponsored super-team, the Winter Guard, alongside Fantasma, the Red Guardian, Vostok, and Crimson Dynamo. Perun is an avatar of the Slavic god of the same name.

Perun and the Winter Guard come into conflict with the Hulk and the Pantheon over the kidnapping of Igor Drenkov, a Russian spy. The Hulk believes Drenkov to have been responsible for his, the Hulk's, creation. Drenkov is put through a re-creation of the incident, which causes great distress. The Hulk easily defeats Perun and takes his weapons, using them to temporarily entrap Vostok. The confrontation ends in a stalemate, for Drenkov had gone mad with guilt and nobody was sure what to do.

Perun and fellow Slavic god Chernobog later join the Winter Guard.

== Pestilence ==
Pestilence is the name of several characters in the Marvel Comics universe; some are members of the Horsemen of Apocalypse.

=== Plague ===
Pestilence

Publication information
- Publisher: Marvel Comics
- First appearance: Uncanny X-Men vol. 1 #169 (February 1983)
- Created by: Chris Claremont (writer); Paul Smith (artist)

In-story information
- Full name: Plague
- Species: Human mutant
- Team affiliations: Morlocks; Horsemen of Apocalypse
- Notable aliases: Pestilence
- Abilities: Disease Vector

Plague was originally a member of the Morlocks with disease-inducing abilities. She was saved from the Mutant Massacre by Apocalypse, and joined as Pestilence. She fell to her death after Molecula accidentally knocked her off her flying steed.

=== F.R. Crozier ===
Pestilence

Publication information
- Publisher: Marvel Comics
- First appearance: Alpha Flight #36 (April 1986)
- Created by: Bill Mantlo; David Ross

In-story information
- Alter ego: F.R. Crozier
- Abilities: Shapeshifting; Various mystical powers and abilities

This character is an adaptation of Francis Crozier, an Ulsterman who disappeared while searching for the Northwest Passage. Six months after the departure of the expedition, the ships became trapped in ice. The captain set forth with a party in search of help and was never seen again. Crozier led the remainder over the ice, only for much of the crew to die of exposure. Crozier ingested an elixir he had prepared before, entering a state of suspended animation.

Crozier possesses Snowbird's newborn son, calling himself Pestilence. Pestilence travels south, in possession of the baby, until he reaches a mining town in Klondike. He is followed by the child's father, Douglas Thompson, who dies of Pestilence's plague. Alpha Flight battles Pestilence until he takes control of Snowbird, forcing Alpha Flight to kill her. After Snowbird is buried, Pestilence rises from Snowbird's grave and attacks Alpha Flight until he is trapped in Shaman's medicine bag.

Pestilence had a number of supernatural abilities of unknown origin, perhaps deriving from his being buried at a place of power for over a century . He had the power to spontaneously generate life forms symbolic of disease and death, including insects. He could control the spirits of the dead, transform his appearance into that of other people, generate disease, cause instantaneous but temporary rapid aging and had the power to draw upon the "bodily decay" of other living beings to rejuvenate himself. Pestilence had extensive knowledge of chemistry beyond what was commonly known in the 19th century.

=== Ichisumi ===
Pestilence

Publication information
- Publisher: Marvel Comics
- First appearance: Uncanny X-Force vol. 1 #2 (January 2011)
- Created by: Rick Remender (writer); Jerome Opena (artist)

In-story information
- Full name: Ichisumi
- Species: Human mutant
- Team affiliations: Horsemen of Apocalypse

Ichisumi is a geisha who comes from 19th-century Kumamoto, Japan. Ichisumi was jealous of all the more beautiful and intelligent women around her as she suffered from a severe inferiority complex. Stemming from her repressed rage and the disapproval of her father, Ichisumi attacked the other geishas with a swarm of beetles generated through her mutant abilities to absorb thoughts and memories. She enters a relationship with Archangel and is later revealed to be pregnant with his child. She has since given birth to twins, Eimin and Uriel, known as the Apocalypse Twins.

=== Pestilence (First Horseman of Apocalypse) ===
Pestilence

Publication information
- Publisher: Marvel Comics
- First appearance: Marvel Comics #1000 (Oct. 2019)
- Created by: Jonathan Hickman (writer); Dustin Weaver (artist)

In-story information
- Full name: Pestilence
- Species: Human mutant
- Team affiliations: Horsemen of Apocalypse
- Partnerships: Apocalypse (father); Genesis (mother)
- Abilities: Disease Vector

Pestilence is one of four children of Apocalypse and Genesis, born and raised on Okkara. She and her siblings grow up to be the first Horsemen of Apocalypse and fight against the Brood in Ancient Egypt. When the forces of Amenth invade Earth and split Okkara into Krakoa and Arakko, Pestilence, along with her mother, her siblings, all Okkaran mutants, and Arakko, is voluntarily sealed away in Amenth to stop the invasion while her father Apocalypse remains on Earth.

When Genesis incites a civil war on Arakko, Pestilence joins her mother there and fights against Storm and her allies. When she attempts to kill Storm, she is killed by Death.

Pestilence is an Omega-level mutant able to create poisoned arrows that infect their targets with a transmissible fatal disease, an ability known as "Disease Vector". She is also very long-lived, having been alive for thousands of years.

=== North ===
In a possible future depicted in "House of X and Powers of X", Pestilence is North, a Chimera created from the DNA of Polaris and Emma Frost.

=== Other characters named Pestilence ===
The Pestilence title has also been held by Spider-Man and Emplate in alternate realities.

=== Pestilence in other media ===
- The Plague incarnation of Pestilence appears in X-Men: The Animated Series, voiced by Judy Marshak. Another incarnation of Pestilence who served Apocalypse in ancient times made a non-speaking cameo later in the series.
- An original incarnation of Pestilence appears in X-Men: Evolution as Mystique (voiced by Colleen Wheeler).
- An original incarnation of Pestilence appears in X-Men: Apocalypse, portrayed by Warren Scherer.
- The Ichisumi incarnation of Pestilence makes a non-speaking appearance in the X-Men '97 episode "Days of Past Future".

== Petra ==
Petra is a character appearing in the comic books published by Marvel Comics. The character first appears in the limited series X-Men: Deadly Genesis #1 (November 2005), and was created by writer Ed Brubaker and artist Pete Woods. She is one of the "Missing X-Men".

Petra was the first of her family to be born in the United States. Her mother, father and brother emigrated from Denmark while the former was pregnant with her. They lived the typical American life in the suburbs of New York City for most of her childhood. Shortly after her thirteenth birthday, Petra's family was killed by a rockslide while on a camping trip, and Petra unknowingly used her mutant powers of earth manipulation to avoid getting hurt. After spending weeks in Child Protective Services, Petra was sent to live in New Jersey in a foster home. She was placed in a home that had five other children that were forced to share the same bedroom. Her foster mother was old and uncaring, and her foster father was too caring while trying to hold and touch her all the time.

One day on an outing to Central Park, her foster father tried to touch her yet sank knee-deep into the ground. It was then that Petra realized that she was a mutant, and she ran away. She found a cave and hid there for days crying, knowing that with her abilities she could have either killed or saved her family. She camped in Central Park for a couple of years, using her power to manipulate rock caves into shelters to avoid being arrested and sent to juvenile detention centers. When she was sixteen, she discovered another useful aspect of her ability: she could turn coal into diamonds by concentrating hard enough. For a year, she used this aspect of her power to make diamonds of varying sizes to sell to pawn shops so she could buy food and survive. One day, however, a pawn shop employee said he was going to call the owner of the store, but he called the police. Running to her rock shelter, the police found Petra before she could hide, and took her into custody after a brief battle. When she awoke, a female guard informed her that she was being released into the custody of Moira MacTaggert who was there to help Petra. This at first frightened Petra because she had never known anyone to try to help her because of her abilities, only hurt her. After some time with MacTaggert, Professor X took Petra alongside Sway, Darwin, and Vulcan to rescue the original X-Men team trapped on the mutant island Krakoa, during which Petra and Sway were killed.

=== Powers and abilities of Petra ===
Petra is a "terrakinetic" or "geo-morph", having the ability to psychokinetically manipulate, control, levitate and reshape the earth. She can use this power to cause minor earthquakes and create shapes out of solid rock.

=== Petra in other media ===
A character based on Petra named Christy Nord appears in Wolverine and the X-Men, voiced by Kari Wahlgren as an adult and Danielle Judovits as a child. This version is the geokinetic daughter of Christoph Nord.

== Phage ==
Phage is the name used by a symbiote in Marvel Comics. The symbiote, created by David Michelinie and Ron Lim, first appeared in Venom: Lethal Protector #4 (May 1993), and was named in Carnage, U.S.A. #2 (March 2012). It was created as one of five symbiote "children" forcefully spawned from the Venom symbiote along with Riot, Agony, Lasher and Scream. Phage is usually depicted as a brown symbiote that primarily covers its appendages with spikes.

=== Carl Mach ===
Phage's first host was Carl Mach, a mercenary hired alongside Scream (Donna Diego), Agony (Leslie Gesneria), Lasher (Ramon Hernandez) and Riot (Trevor Cole) by Carlton Drake's Life Foundation in San Francisco. Phage and his four symbiote "siblings" are defeated by Spider-Man and Venom. The hosts kidnap Eddie Brock in an attempt to communicate with their symbiotes in Chicago. Brock refuses to aid them while the hosts are killed by Diego.

=== Rico Axelson ===
Phage's second host was Rico Axelson, a Lieutenant assigned alongside Riot (Howard Odgen), Lasher (Marcus Simms), and Agony (James Murphy) to the Mercury Team. With Cletus Kasady on the loose in Colorado, Phage and the Team Mercury assist Spider-Man, Scorn and Flash Thompson. However, Phage and his teammates are killed by Carnage in their secret base, and the four symbiotes bond with Mercury Team's dog.

=== Billy ===
After being possessed by Knull, the four symbiotes possess a bickering family, with Phage taking the son Billy. The group head to New York to assist in Carnage's quest and hunt Dylan Brock and Normie Osborn but are defeated and separated from their hosts by the Maker. Under Knull's possession, Phage merges with his "siblings" into one, but is defeated by Andi Benton.

=== Mitch ===
Phage's fourth host is Buck Cashman's hunting dog Mitch.

=== Carl Strickland ===
During the "Venom War" storyline, the Phage symbiote bonds with Carl Strickland of the Wild Pack while fighting the Zombiotes.

=== Phage in other media ===
- The Carl Mach incarnation of Phage appears as a boss in Spider-Man and Venom: Separation Anxiety.
- The Carl Mach incarnation of Phage appears as a playable character in Spider-Man Unlimited.
- The Phage symbiote appears in Venom: The Last Dance, portrayed by Jack Brady. This version is captured along with other symbiotes by the government organization Imperium after landing on Earth. Phage later bonds with the security guard Jim to help Venom and the symbiotes fight against the Xenophages. Phage is destroyed by a rocket-propelled grenade fired by Rex Strickland.

== Chester Phillips ==
- Further reading: Chester Phillips at the Comic Book DB (archived from the original)

Chester Phillips is a World War II general in the Marvel Universe. The character, created by Stan Lee and Jack Kirby, first appeared in Tales of Suspense #63 (March 1965).

Chester Phillips is one of the army officers overseeing subject selection for Project: Rebirth. He takes a personal interest in Steve Rogers as the best candidate for the first test. Phillips and Abraham Erskine refuse to allow General Maxfield Saunders to have Clinton McIntyre receive the first full treatment. When Saunders steals the serum and apparently kills McIntyre, Phillips has the body shipped away and Saunders arrested.

=== Chester Phillips in other media ===
- Chester Phillips appears in The Marvel Super Heroes.
- Chester Phillips appears in The Avengers: Earth's Mightiest Heroes.
- Chester Phillips appears in media set in the Marvel Cinematic Universe (MCU), portrayed by Tommy Lee Jones. First appearing in Captain America: The First Avenger, this version is a colonel, leader of the Strategic Scientific Reserve (SSR), and a co-founder of S.H.I.E.L.D. Additionally, an alternate timeline version of Phillips appears in the What If...? episode "What If... Captain Carter Were the First Avenger?", in which he is killed by Heinz Kruger and succeeded by John Flynn.

== Phobos ==
Phobos

Publication information
- Publisher: Marvel Comics
- First appearance: Original: Dr. Strange, Sorcerer Supreme #32 (August 1991); Current: Ares: God of War #1 (March 2006)
- Created by: Original: Roy Thomas; Jean-Marc Lofficier; Current: Michael Avon Oeming; Travel Foreman

In-story information
- Full name: Original: Phobos; Current: Alexander Aaron
- Species: Olympian
- Team affiliations: Original: Olympians; Current: Secret Warriors
- Notable aliases: Original: God of Fear; Current: Pre-Retcon: God of War; Currently: Phobos
- Abilities: Original: Ability to Instill Fear and Control Others; Super Strength and Endurance; Current: Pre-Retcon: Mastery of All Forms of Weaponry; Super Strength and Endurance; Currently: Ability to Instill Fear in Others; Precognition

Phobos is the name of two fictional comic book characters appearing in books published by Marvel Comics characters, based on the Greek mythological deity of the same name. The first appeared in Dr. Strange, Sorcerer Supreme #32 (August 1991) in a story written by Roy Thomas and Jean-Marc Lofficier.

The second and current Phobos first appeared in the 2006 Ares: God of War mini-series (written by Michael Avon Oeming; art by Travel Foreman). He is the son of Ares, step-brother to Hippolyta, and a member of the Secret Warriors.

Due to the nature of gods in the Marvel Universe, in addition to the retcon surrounding the current Phobos (see below) the relationship between the two has not been explicitly explained.

=== Original ===
The original Phobos first appeared in the "A Gathering of Fear" storyline in Dr. Strange, Sorcerer Supreme #32 (August 1991) written by Roy Thomas and Jean-Marc Lofficier. He reappeared in "The Great Fear" storyline in DS:SS #39 (March 1992).

Phobos and his brother Deimos are sons of Ares and Nox (posing as Venus) but were killed by Thor and Hercules in their first appearance. Later the Fear Lords release so much fear that Nox is able to bring her sons back, creating them from the Darkforce but they were eventually defeated again. Phobos meets his final fate when Amatsu-Mikaboshi assaults Olympus and kills him.

=== Alexander ===
The current Phobos, Alexander, first appeared in the Ares limited series in 2006 written by Michael Avon Oeming. Here, he is manipulated by Amatsu-Mikaboshi into becoming a warrior until his father, Ares, saves him many years later, a young adult with god-like powers. This ending is ignored for future storyline purposes. The character returns, retconned by Brian Michael Bendis and reduced to a ten-year-old boy with no specialized training in Mighty Avengers #1, then reappears in the Secret Invasion crossover, in Mighty Avengers and the Secret Invasion limited series. Once Dark Reign started, he began appearing regularly in Secret Warriors.

During the Secret Invasion storyline, Alex is recruited by Nick Fury for his team of Secret Warriors. Post-invasion, he remains a member of the team and has shown evidence of additional pre-cognitive powers.

Phobos was sent to Elysium after having been stabbed and killed by Gorgon. His last appearance had his father proud of his actions as they were reunited in the afterlife.

=== Powers and abilities of Phobos ===
Both versions of Phobos control the power of fear, a power that has been seen to cause victims to run for their lives as well as attack their partners. Certain characters have proven immune to this ability (i.e. Nick Fury and Gorgon); they cite that they lack fear as the reason. The current version of Phobos (Alex) was at one time a highly trained swordsman and possessed strength and endurance similar to other Olympian gods in the Marvel universe, however this has since been ret-conned. Secret Warriors #10 re-establishes his training with a sword. He was denied use of it by his father Ares, who required him to be proficient in all forms of arms before returning his sword. Currently he, like the previous Phobos, can instill fear in others. Additionally, he has shown evidence of pre-cognitive powers. When utilizing his fear based powers, Alex's eyes glow. The color has shown to vary between white and red. Whether this is simply due to the artist's rendering or the level of power usage is unknown.

=== Relationship between the two Phobos ===
According to the Thor & Hercules: Encyclopaedia Mythologica, the original Phobos and the current Alex are two separate characters. More specifically, they are half-brothers. The Phobos profile indicates that the original Phobos (and his brother Deimos) were killed during Mikaboshi's invasion of Olympus, and that Alexander inherited the fear-based powers of his slain older half-brother following his return to Earth.

=== Reception of Phobos ===
- In 2019, CBR.com ranked Phobos 9th in their "Marvel Comics: The 10 Most Powerful Olympians" list.
- In 2022, Sportskeeda ranked Phobos 9th in their "10 best Greek gods from Marvel comics" list.

== Photon ==
Photon is the name of two characters in Marvel Comics.

== Piecemeal ==
Piecemeal is the name of two characters in Marvel Comics.

=== Gilbert Benson ===
Gilbert Benson was a mutant with the ability to absorb different energy frequencies and store them within his body. His mother, the armored mutant mercenary known as Harness, forced Gilbert to travel across the world with her to absorb the dispersed energy of Proteus.

Absorbing the energy, Piecemeal grew into a monstrous amalgamation of Gilbert and Proteus and set about warping reality across Scotland. Eventually the X-Factor team convinced the amalgamation that it could never be happy, and it opted to end its own existence.

=== Cyborg ===
Piecemeal was a cyborg created in a secret Amazon laboratory by a scientific team supervised by the Red Skull. Piecemeal was assembled from a combination of human and animal corpses and high-tech weaponry for the purpose of being the ultimate killing machine. Before the Red Skull could fully program Piecemeal's mind, the Hulk attacked the laboratory, but Piecemeal escaped in the confusion. The mindless Piecemeal wandered through the Amazon before stowing away on a cargo plane en route to Scotland. A retired Pantheon member residing on Loch Ness later summoned the Hulk when Piecemeal began attacking tourists and draining their minds. Piecemeal battled the Hulk–during which he revealed his ability to duplicate the Hulk's appearance and powers–and was apparently killed.

== Piranha ==
Piranha

Publication information
- Publisher: Marvel Comics
- First appearance: Sub-Mariner #70 (May 1974)
- Created by: Marv Wolfman (writer); George Tuska (artist)

In-story information
- Species: Mutated piranha
- Team affiliations: Deep Six
- Abilities: Superhuman strength, speed, agility, stamina and durability Underwater breathing Paralyzing venom Marine telepathy Healing factor Asexual reproduction

Piranha is a supervillain appearing in American comic books published by Marvel Comics. The character first appeared in Sub-Mariner #70 (May 1974) and was created by Marv Wolfman and George Tuska.

Piranha is a piranha who was evolved into an anthropomorphic form after being exposed to radiation generated by Lemuel Dorcas's experiments. During a battle with Namor, Piranha is injured and his blood attracts his piranha servants, who consume him. The fish evolve into identical forms to the original, but are killed in a conflict with Namor and the Thing. The original Piranha later regenerates his body and joins Deep Six. Piranha is infected with the zombie plague by Headpool, and killed by the Midnight Sons.

== Pit Bull ==
Pit Bull is an anthropomorphic pit bull who is the leader of a drug cartel in Mexico called the Man-Dogs.

== P.L.A.T.O. ==
P.L.A.T.O. (Piezo-electrical Logistic Analytical Tactical Operator) is a character appearing in American comic books published by Marvel Comics. The character, created by Dan Abnett, Andy Lanning and Tom Tenney, first appeared in Force Works vol. 1 #1 (May 1994).

P.L.A.T.O. is an artificial intelligence created by Tony Stark / Iron Man for assistance within Stark Enterprises.

== Matthew Plunder ==
Matthew Plunder is a character appearing in American comic books published by Marvel Comics. He is the son of Ka-Zar and Shanna the She-Devil. He lived with his family in the Savage Land. The character, created by Chris Claremont and Art Adams, first appeared in X-Men Annual #12 (June, 1988).

When Skaar accidentally unleashed The Designer from its prison, it possessed his mother Shanna and tried to kill Matthew. He escaped into the jungle, but after meeting up with Skaar, was captured by those working for the Designer, when Skaar deemed it more important to save his people than Matthew. He was placed inside the wormhole on the Savage Land and was rescued along with all the other trapped souls by Skaar. He then joined the army that was formed and was seen alive after the Designer was defeated.

A much older Matthew saved the life of Valeria Richards with his Pterosaur Dax after she was dropped by one of the Swamp Men's Terror Birds in midair. After straightening out the situation with the alien Prah'd'gul, Valeria played small talk with Matthew about his age progression through a time traveling incident and flirted with him as they went their separate ways.

== Plunderer ==
The Plunderer (Parnival Plunder) is a fictional character appearing in American comic books published by Marvel Comics. The character first appeared in Daredevil #12 (January 1966), and was created by writer Stan Lee and artist Jack Kirby. He was the younger brother of the character Ka-Zar, as revealed in his origin story in Daredevil #13.

Kevin and Parnival were the sons of Lord Robert Plunder. When Robert discovered the Savage Land, he sent Kevin to explore it and kept Parnival stationed as a sailor to protect them. Believing Kevin dead after a time, he took their family home as a base of operations for his criminal career as Plunderer. He would later clash with Ka-Zar multiple times, as well as other heroes.

Parnival successfully smuggled the Savage Land's terraforming machinery into New York City, which had devastating effects on the Savage Land. During the Civil War, the Plunderer was seemingly killed by Punisher, but it was later revealed to be a representative. His morality is briefly inverted during AXIS, but is later returned to normal.

== Pogg Ur-Pogg ==
Pogg Ur-Pogg is a character appearing in American comic books published by Marvel Comics, created by writer Jonathan Hickman and artists Pepe Larraz and Leinil Francis Yu and first appearing in X of Swords: Stasis (December 2020).

Pogg Ur-Pogg was a mercenary from the dimension of Amenth who constantly spoke in rhyme and had a love of gems and precious metals. Pogg was recruited to fight for Arakko in the X of Swords tournament. His first two contests were duels against Magik. He defeated her in their first fight but lost in their second. He won the three subsequent contests in which he participated.

Though he appears to be a large multi-armed, crocodile-like beast, this is actually an organic suit. Pogg Ur-Pogg's true body is that of a small, weak, goblin-like creature. In combat, he wields a khopesh-like sword.

== Poison ==
Poison is the name of several characters in Marvel Comics.

=== Aliens ===
The Poisons are a crystalline alien race spawned by the Poison Queen, from the alternate Earth-17952. Created by Cullen Bunn and Iban Coello, they first appeared in Edge of Venomverse #2 (July, 2017). Capable of assimilating symbiotes, they sought to conquer realities by infecting superhumans with symbiotes, before feeding on them. The Poisons were defeated by Jean Grey, but Jimmy Hudson retained his symbiote and took the name Poison.

=== Cecilia Cardinale ===
Poison (Cecilia Cardinale) is a character appearing in American comic books published by Marvel Comics. The character was created by writer Steve Gerber and artist Cynthia Martin, first appearing in Web of Spider-Man Annual #4 (1988). Poison is a Cuban woman that bonded with an alien known as Ylandris when she was dying in prison, gifting her superhuman abilities, notably the ability to kill with a look. She worked as a vigilante in Miami, but was later killed and resurrected by the Hand as their agent, before being killed by Wolverine.

=== What If?: The Other ===
An alternate version of Spider-Man was bonded to a symbiote known as Poison in What if?: The Other.

== Portal ==
Portal

Publication information
- Publisher: Marvel Comics
- First appearance: Avengers #304 (June 1989) as Portal: Darkhawk #5 (July 1991)
- Created by: Danny Fingeroth; Rich Buckler

In-story information
- Alter ego: Charles Little Sky
- Species: Human mutant
- Team affiliations: A.R.M.O.R.
- Abilities: Dimensional teleportation and manipulation; Alien weaponry

Portal (Charles Little Sky) is a mutant superhero appearing in American comic books published by Marvel Comics. The character first appeared as Charles Little Sky in Avengers #304 (June 1989) and as Portal in Darkhawk #5 (July 1991) where he was created by Danny Fingeroth and Rick Buckler.

Native American Charles Little Sky was born in Hartsdale, New Mexico. As a teenager, he manifested his dimension-spanning powers during a confrontation between the Avengers and Puma, the superhuman protector of Little Sky's tribe. Little Sky fled the reservation he lived on, moving to New York City where he took a job as a construction worker. He was followed by Puma, who had set out in pursuit of Little Sky out of fear that his powers would prove dangerous. When Puma finally tracked him down at Ellis Island, Little Sky's powers activated for the first time, opening a portal to the dimension where the U-Foes had been exiled, freeing them. The U-Foes attempted to kill Little Sky to keep him from using his powers to banish them again, and the Avengers and Puma were forced to team up to protect him. During the fight, Little Sky escaped, using his powers and began traveling the dimensions.

Portal is one of the few mutants who retained their superhuman powers after the M-Day. He is shown as the director of A.R.M.O.R. and he used his powers to transport Machine Man and Jocasta to the Marvel Zombies universe. He collects Jocasta after Machine Man retrieves a sample of Vanessa Fisk's tissues, but is forced to leave a badly damaged Machine Man behind.

Portal is a mutant capable of opening rifts in space passing through extra-dimensional warps to transport himself and others. His portals allow instantaneous travel between different vibratory-attuned planes of reality, or "dimensions". Opening a portal without preparation will give him access to another dimension completely at random. Portal is capable of using his powers for teleportation, traveling instantly across about a few miles within a single dimension. Trying to transport himself more than a few miles in one jump, however, will destabilize the portal and send him off into another dimension, even if he is trying to stay anchored in one. Dimensional warps created by Portal cease to exist when he is rendered unconscious. Portal has also been shown to be able to home in on other people who have gone through one of his portals, opening a new gateway to retrieve or follow them if necessary. He used that ability to rescue Spider-Man from the dimension he had thrown the wall-crawler into while under Sauron's control. Portal is also armed with a wide variety of weaponry, including a huge gun that shoots 'energy harpoons' (fires concussive force blasts capable of leveling an office building), a hand-weapon (capable of firing a fast-hardening adhesive substance which impedes physical movement of target), a wheel (a 1/2-inch-thick (13 mm) throwing disc which can separate into components with independent guidance systems, each of which contains a burst of concussive force equal to several hand grenades). He also has a suit of body armor composed of alien materials that he stole from a dead Darkhawk android that has been outfitted to allow him to survive in space. Portal carries a supply of adhesive ammunition contained in his belt, and a directional mechanism that focuses his warp power. Little Sky also has a quantity of gymnastics training. He is highly skilled in the use of his own weaponry, and a skilled motorcyclist.

== Post ==
Kevin Tremain was a mutant captured and studied by the Mandarin. His first appearance was in X-Men (vol. 2) #50. On a secret mission, the Six Pack attacked the secret base Tremain was held in. Tremain was mortally injured; Cable tried to save his life, first by using his telekinesis to keep Tremain's body together, and finally by giving him a blood transfusion. Although it seems he survived this trauma, Cable seemed to think Tremain had later died.

Years later, Tremain resurfaced as Post, the lowest of Onslaught's emissaries. Post had superhuman size, strength, stamina, and sturdiness. He was also a mathematical genius. After being infected with the techno-organic virus via blood transfusion from Cable, Post became a cyborg, who was also able to generate energy discharges, cloaking fields, biogenetic scanners and teleport himself to remote locations.

== Malcolm Powder ==
- Further reading: Malcolm Powder at the Comic Book DB (archived from the original); Malcolm Powder at the Grand Comics Database

Malcolm Powder first appeared in Alias #6 (April 2002), created by Brian Michael Bendis and Michael Gaydos. Powder was a high school student and a fan of Jessica Jones.

He made his first appearance by breaking into Jessica's apartment and answering her phone. Jessica kicked him out. Later, while Jessica was looking for a Rick Jones (not the famous one), Powder showed up again asking for a job as her personal part-time secretary. He was kicked out once again.

Powder arrived again, this time asking Jessica about the secret identities of Captain America and Daredevil. He asked for a job, and Jessica agreed under the condition that he find information on Mattie Franklin, who was missing. To Jessica's surprise, Powder showed up with a girl named Laney, who claimed her brother was dating Mattie around the time she disappeared. He was last seen answering Jessica's phone as her secretary.

=== Malcolm Powder in other media ===
A character based on Malcolm Powder named Malcolm Ducasse appears in series set in the Marvel Cinematic Universe, portrayed by Eka Darville. He is Jessica Jones' neighbor and associate.

== Powderkeg ==
Powderkeg

Publication information
- Publisher: Marvel Comics
- First appearance: Captain Marvel Special #1 (1989)
- Created by: Dwayne McDuffie; Mark D. Bright

In-story information
- Alter ego: Frank Skorina
- Team affiliations: Masters of Evil
- Abilities: Superhuman strength High-level resistance to injury Ability to sweat a nitroglycerin like compound which can detonate on impact

Powderkeg is a supervillain appearing in American comic books published by Marvel Comics. Powderkeg first appeared in Captain Marvel Special #1 and was created by Dwayne McDuffie and Mark D. Bright.

Little is known about the man who became Powderkeg. He was a mercenary hired to steal high-tech circuitry for Brazilian crime lord Kristina Ramos. He ran afoul of Captain Marvel (Monica Rambeau) who had thought she lost her powers after stopping a mutated Marrina. She encounters Powderkeg and used her new powers to defeat him. Powderkeg fights the Avengers during a failed mass prison escape occurring at the Vault ("Venom Deathrap: The Vault"). During the incident, he follows the leader of the breakout, Venom. Teamed with Mentallo and Vermin, they temporarily defeat Iron Man and Hank Pym. The entire breakout is soon neutralized by technological means, with energy pumped through Mentallo.

Powderkeg is later recruited by Doctor Octopus to join his incarnation of the Masters of Evil during the Infinity War. The Masters of Evil confront the Guardians of the Galaxy in the Avengers Mansion. Everyone becomes embroiled in a fight against evil doubles of both teams. Magus, the villain behind the Infinity War, had recruited an army of super-powered doubles to defeat and absorb Earth's superpowered resistance. Both groups work together to survive the assault. Doctor Octopus wants to continue his assault on the Mansion and on the Guardians. Powderkeg and his other allies disagree, unwilling to turn on those who they had fought besides minutes earlier. The Masters turn on Octopus, pursuing him out of the Mansion.

Powderkeg is superhumanly strong and highly resistant to injury. He sweats a nitroglycerin-like compound which can detonate on impact, lending explosive force to his punches.

== Power Man ==
Power Man is the name of three characters in Marvel Comics.

== Powerhouse ==
Powerhouse is the name of three characters in Marvel Comics.

=== Rieg Davan ===
Rieg Davan was a member of the Syfon division of the Nova Corps, Xandar's superhuman military. He was sent into space to perform surveillance on the starship of Zorr, an interstellar warlord. Before Davan could report on Zorr's activities, his ship was hit by a meteor shower and careened off-course, eventually landing on Earth. Davan was found by Condor, who brainwashed Davan into serving him. Eventually, Davan regained his memory and returned to Xandar. Davan was later killed in battle with Nebula.

=== Powerhouse (mutant) ===
The second Powerhouse is a mutant with a strong hatred for humanity. As Beast is giving a lecture at Empire State University, Powerhouse attacks, intending to spread her anti-human message. Simultaneously, a mutant hater called Masterblaster decides to spread his presence and opinions at the same lecture. Beast battles both Powerhouse and Masterblaster until Spider-Man arrives. While Spider-Man keeps Powerhouse busy, Beast knocks out Masterblaster. Spider-Man and Beast team up on Powerhouse and knock her out.

== Powerlift ==
Powerlift (Keisha Kwan) is a character appearing in American comic books published by Marvel Comics. The character, created by Cody Ziglar and Federico Vicentini, first appeared in Miles Morales: Spider-Man vol. 2 #13 (December 2023).

== Presence ==
Presence is a character appearing in American comic books published by Marvel Comics.

As a younger man, Sergei Krylov was a Belarusian nuclear physicist born in Minsk, BSSR. His twin children, Nikolai Krylenko and Laynia Petrovna, were taken from birth by the Soviet government to be trained as soldiers, after their mutant natures manifested.

Sergei eventually became one of the most influential men behind the scenes of the Soviet government. However, despite being a scientific genius, he was also quite mad. He caused a Chernobyl-like nuclear disaster in the "Forbidden Zone" using cobalt radiation baths and a nuclear blast, which transformed Tania Belinsky into his super-powered thrall as the second Red Guardian. The nuclear energy transformed Sergei into a superhuman being as well, and he could now generate nuclear energy within his own body for various uses. Sergi began calling himself "The Presence". The Presence and Red Guardian battled the Defenders when they came to find her. The Presence left when she regained her free will and spurned him.

The government now wanted the threat of the Presence eliminated. His own children had been trained by the government as super-powered soldiers and, unaware of their true relationship, were sent to kill him. Alongside the Red Guardian, Presence encountered the Hulk, Professor Phobos, and the Soviet Super-Soldiers in the "Forbidden Zone". Darkstar and Vanguard learned that the Presence was their father and turned against the Soviet regime, and saved the Presence from Phobos. To save the Soviet Union from the radiation of the Forbidden Zone, an irradiated Soviet wasteland, the Presence and the Red Guardian absorbed the radiation into themselves and left for outer space, where they claimed they would transform themselves into inert matter. The twins became agents on their own, fighting for the good of the people, and sometimes working with their father.

Vanguard was ultimately killed in a battle while he and Darkstar were aiding Quasar. Darkstar blamed Quasar for her brother's death and fled back to Russia. When she encountered her father, Darkstar shared her feelings with him, and the Presence forced Quasar to flee Earth on the threat of killing Quasar's loved ones. Sergei visited his son's memorial and sought to revive him by shifting his atoms to microscopically enter Vanguard's body. There he discovered a trace of Vanguard's mutant energy remained, keeping him faintly alive. The Presence managed to use this energy to resurrect his son, but nearly exhausted his own power, and was cast adrift in the subatomic reality he had entered.

While in subatomic exile, the Presence discovered new aspects of his power and atomic particles, and when he had sufficiently regenerated, resumed his normal size and returned to the Forbidden Zone. There he embarked on a plan to unite all of the former Soviet Union by transforming its people into a race of zombie-like radioactive beings living under a communal mind.

In the 2010 Darkstar and Winter Guard limited series, The Presence was apparently destroyed permanently when the Russian superhero Powersurge sacrificed his life to defeat him after he once again tried to conquer Russia after Starlight left him for good to join the People's Protectorate, where she fell in love with his son, Vanguard.

=== Presence in other media ===
Presence appears in Lego Marvel Super Heroes 2.

== Preyy ==
Preyy is Erik Killmonger's trained leopard who was killed during his rise to power in Wakanda by Achebe.

== Lee Price ==
- First appearance: Venom (Vol. 3) #1 (November 2016)
- Created by: Mike Costa, Gerardo Sandoval
- Species: Human, Zombie
- Teams: Black Cat's Gang, Inklings
- Aliases: Venom, Maniac
- Further reading: Lee Price at the Grand Comics Database

Lee Price is a character appearing in American comic books published by Marvel Comics. He was created by Mike Costa and Gerardo Sandoval, and first appears in Venom (Vol. 3) #1. Lee Price was an Army Ranger discharged after losing two of his fingers in an explosion. Unable to find gainful employment due to his disability, Price was hired as an enforcer for Black Cat's criminal organization. Price was almost killed in an arms-deal gone wrong, but was saved by the Venom symbiote, who he dominated using his military training. Price intended to keep the symbiote a secret and use it to rise through the ranks of Black Cat's gang, but his identity was discovered by a pair of corrupt FBI agents who attempted to blackmail him into becoming a mole. Price was double-crossed by fellow enforcer Mac Gargan, who was suspicious of him and bore a grudge against the symbiote from his time as its host. Confronted by Spider-Man, Price attempted to escape with the symbiote. However, Spider-Man and the symbiote's former host Eddie Brock, now an agent for the FBI's Anti-Symbiote Task Force, managed to help it break free of Price's control and it abandoned him to be arrested.

Price's lawyer was able to get him exonerated by arguing that the crimes he committed had been due to the symbiote's influence, and Price promptly attacked Andi Benton and stole her symbiote, taking the alias Maniac and using it to establish his own crime syndicate--the Inklings. Spider-Man, Venom, Andi, Black Cat, and Flash Thompson--now bonded to the Anti-Venom symbiote--set aside their differences to stop Price from seizing control of all of New York's crime families, though he remained bonded to the weakened Mania symbiote. Imprisoned again, Price was killed by Cletus Kasady disguised as Eddie Brock in order to extract his symbiote.

During the Blood Hunt event, the vampiric alien Threkker reanimated Price's corpse--as well as the remnants of the Mania symbiote still present in his body--to serve as bait for symbiotes. The Venom symbiote rebonded to the zombified Price to defeat Threkker, but was separated from him by Meridius--an evil future version of Eddie Brock. Meridius used the reanimated remnants of the Mania symbiote to create the K-Chemical version #44, which he attempted to use to conquer the Earth. Although Meridius was destroyed and the "Zombiote" plague stopped, Price remained locked in a vault in one of Alchemax's laboratories.

== Primal ==
Primal

Publication information
- Publisher: Marvel Comics
- First appearance: Uncanny X-Men #529 (October 2010)
- Created by: Matt Fraction; Kieron Gillen

In-story information
- Alter ego: Teon Macik
- Species: Human mutant
- Team affiliations: The Lights; X-Men; Jean Grey School for Higher Learning
- Notable aliases: The Fourth Light, The Modern Primitive, Instinct
- Abilities: Superhuman physical ability Hyperinstinct

Primal (Teon Macik) is a mutant superhero appearing in American comic books published by Marvel Comics. The character first appeared in The Uncanny X-Men #529, and was created by Matt Fraction and Kieron Gillen. He is one of the "Five Lights" — a group of mutants who manifested their abilities after the events of "Second Coming". Primal's mutation enhances his physical abilities, giving him heightened instincts and a resistance to telepathic probing or assault.

Teon Macik is a Ukrainian boy who was recruited to the Lights by Hope Summers, joining Transonic, Oya, Zero, and Velocidad. He remained with the team on Utopia during Schism, and was present during Avengers vs X-Men, Age of X-Man and the Krakoan Age.

== Prism ==
Prism (Robbie) is a supervillain appearing in American comic books published by Marvel Comics, debuting in X-Factor #10 (November 1986) by Chris Claremont and Louise Simonson. Prism is a mutant member of the Marauders with a crystalline body which enables him to absorb, reflect, and amplify light and energy.

Prism debuts during the Mutant Massacre storyline as a member of the Marauders, and he is killed by Jean Grey when she launches his body into a wall. Mister Sinister clones Prism, but he is killed by demons during the Inferno storyline, only to be quickly resurrected by Sinister. Prism retains his powers after the events of M-Day, but is killed during the Messiah Complex, as well as by the Purifiers and Predator X. Prism was resurrected alongside the other Marauders by Magneto as a soldier. He later died and was resurrected on Krakoa.

== Prodigy ==
Prodigy is the name of several characters appearing in American comic books published by Marvel Comics.

=== Ritchie Gilmore ===
Prodigy

Publication information
- Publisher: Marvel Comics
- First appearance: Slingers #0 (Sept. 1998)
- Created by: Joseph Harris; Adam Pollina

In-story information
- Alter ego: Ritchie Gilmore
- Species: Human
- Team affiliations: Slingers; Fifty State Initiative; Heavy Hitters; New Warriors
- Abilities: Adept wrestler Mystically infused costume grants: Vast superhuman strength, speed and stamina Near-flight leaping Gliding via cape

Ritchie Gilmore first appeared in Slingers #0 (Sept. 1998), and was created by Joseph Harris and Adam Pollina. Prodigy was one of the feature characters in the 2011 six-issue limited series Fear Itself: Youth in Revolt. Prodigy eventually joined the Avengers Initiative.

Ritchie Gilmore is a typical jock, captain of his college wrestling team, and one of the most popular guys in school. But Ritchie wants more from life; he wants to be stronger and more powerful. Black Marvel gives him the Prodigy costume, and the chance to be something better. The costume had been imbued with power: it gives Ritchie superhuman strength, he can leap so far and high that it appears that he is flying, and his cape even allows him to glide. Black Marvel makes Ritchie the leader of his new team, the Slingers.

Prodigy openly defies the Superhuman Registration Act during the Civil War storyline. Iron Man soon arrives on the scene along with agents of S.H.I.E.L.D. Prodigy declares Iron Man a traitor and then attacks him. Prodigy is defeated by Iron Man and apprehended by S.H.I.E.L.D. agents. Prodigy is one of the heroes who are freed from his cell by Hulkling, under the guise of Hank Pym. He joins Captain America's side to fight Iron Man.

Prodigy next appears as one of The Initiative's new recruits. One of the stipulations of his release from jail is that he takes responsibility for his drunken actions against Iron Man, then appear to fully support the Initiative. During the Secret Invasion storyline, Prodigy is one of the many heroes who fight rampaging powered Skrulls in Times Square. After the invasion, Prodigy is placed on a probationary period, rather than being assigned to an Initiative team.

After agreeing to work for Norman Osborn as seen in the Dark Reign storyline, Prodigy is placed on the Heavy Hitters. However, eventually he becomes disillusioned with the reorganization of the Initiative under Osborn, who had placed criminals on Initiative teams and publicly seceded his team from the Initiative. Prodigy is captured and held at Prison 42. After Osborn is removed from power following the Siege of Asgard, Prodigy is released and honored for his resistance against Osborn. He has joined the motivational speaker circuit, but he is also trying to reunite the longtime fractured roster of Slingers.

During the Fear Itself storyline, he takes an office job. Then, Steve Rogers has him assemble a new incarnation of the Avengers Initiative, to deal with the fear and chaos that was happening. At the end of the story-arc, he gets a promotion, only to find out his "promotion" is storage arrangement.

Prodigy's costume is mystically infused with power, giving him vast superhuman strength, speed, and stamina. He can leap incredible distances and when he jumps, it appears that he is flying. His golden costume is completely bulletproof, and can withstand most physical assaults. His cape functions as a hang glider, and enables him to glide on air currents. Prodigy is also adept in the skills of collegiate wrestling. He himself is the captain of the wrestling team at Empire State University. He often employs these grappling techniques when he fights. Prodigy has used submission moves as well, which may stem from the trend of collegiate wrestlers competing in MMA.

=== Prodigy in other media ===
- The Ritchie Gilmore incarnation of Prodigy appears as an alternate costume for Spider-Man in Spider-Man 2: Enter Electro.
- The Ritchie Gilmore incarnation of Prodigy appears as a boss in Marvel: Ultimate Alliance 2, voiced by Robert Tinkler.
- The Ritchie Gilmore incarnation of Prodigy appears as an alternate costume for Spider-Man in Spider-Man: Edge of Time.

== Professor ==
The Professor is an alias of three characters in Marvel Comics.

=== Professor Thorton ===
The Professor

Publication information
- Publisher: Marvel Comics
- First appearance: Marvel Comics Presents #72 (January 1991)
- Created by: Barry Windsor-Smith (writer – artist)

In-story information
- Alter ego: Truett Hudson
- Team affiliations: Weapon X Weapon Plus
- Notable aliases: Professor Andre Thorton, Number One
- Abilities: Genius-level intellect

Andre Thorton (real name Truett Hudson; referred to only as the Professor in his initial appearances) had a hand in the origin of Wolverine as part of the Weapon X project. Thorton first appeared in Marvel Comics Presents #72 (January 1991), and was created by Barry Windsor-Smith. Windsor-Smith intended the Professor to be the head of the Weapon X project, but after he had written and drawn several installments of the "Weapon X" serial in which the Professor first appears, Chris Claremont told him that he had always wanted Apocalypse to be the one responsible for Wolverine's adamantium, so he added scenes where the Professor reports to an unseen superior to the later installments.

Because he is referred to only as "The Professor" in the "Weapon X" serial and has obvious physical similarities to Professor X (a narrow skull, baldness, etc.), there was considerable speculation that the character was the young Professor X. Though no in-universe connection between the two was ever established, in an interview shortly before "Weapon X" was published, Windsor-Smith hinted that the similarity was intentional: "... one [character] is called the Professor, who, by sheer coincidence, looks just like Professor X." [emphases in original]

In 1972, Thorton experimented on numerous mutants including Sabretooth and Mastodon. He hired Carol Hines as his assistant and the scientist Abraham Cornelius. His experiments on Wolverine are responsible for the adamantium-laced skeleton. He is also connected to the creation of Alpha Flight on to developing super-soldiers for the US government. During the adamantium-lacing process, the physical trauma causes Wolverine to regress to violent animal behavior, prone to attacking anyone who comes near. In a virtual reality simulation, Thorton's mysterious "master" takes control of Wolverine and has attack everyone in the facility, cutting off Thorton's right hand and killing him. Afterwards Wolverine escapes for real and confronts Thorton. Though the outcome of this encounter is not shown, when Thorton next appears, in Wolverine vol. 2 #49 and 50, he has a metal hook in place of his right hand.

Years later, Thorton and Carol Hines lure Wolverine into an abandoned warehouse in Canada which was once the secret location for the Weapon X program. Codenamed Project X, Wolverine discovers Weapon X was funded by the CIA and sheltered in Canada. Thorton activates the robotic android Shiva which is programmed to destroy all of Project X's test subjects, starting with Wolverine. Project X's other test subject Silver Fox steps forward to interrogate Thorton at gunpoint. He tries to grab the gun from Silver Fox who shoots him fatally.

==== Professor Thorton in other media ====
- Professor Thornton appears in X-Men: The Animated Series, voiced by David Calderisi (for most episodes) and by Michael Fletcher (in "Weapon X, Lies, and Video Tape").
- Professor Thorton appears in the X-Men: Evolution episode "Grim Reminder", voiced by Campbell Lane.
- Professor Thorton appears in Wolverine and the X-Men episode "Past Discretions", voiced by Tom Kane.
- Professor Thorton appears in The Avengers: Earth's Mightiest Heroes episode "Behold...The Vision", voiced again by Tom Kane.
- Professor Thorton appears in the "Hulk vs. Wolverine" segment of Hulk Vs, voiced again by Tom Kane.
- Professor Thorton appears in X2: Wolverine's Revenge, voiced by Don Morrow.
- Professor Thorton appears in X-Men: Legends, voiced by Earl Boen.
- Professor Thorton appears in the Wolverine vs. Sabretooth motion comic, voiced by Trevor Devall.

=== Prosh ===
Prosh

Publication information
- Publisher: Marvel Comics
- First appearance: X-Factor #19 (May 1987)
- Created by: Louise Simonson (writer); Walter Simonson (artist)

In-story information
- Team affiliations: Apocalypse; X-Factor; Cable
- Notable aliases: Ship, Professor, Graymalkin
- Abilities: Artificial intelligence

Prosh is an artificial intelligence. The character, created by Louise Simonson and Walter Simonson, first appeared in X-Factor #19 (May 1987) as the Ship, in X-Force #8 (March 1992) as the Professor, and in X-Force vol. 1 #39 (October 1994) as Prosh.

Prosh was originally a sentient Celestial spacecraft called the Ship which serves as Apocalypse's main base of operations flying over New York before choosing to align with the original X-Men (as X-Factor) and furthering the choice by saving Nathan Summers / Cable from the techno-organic virus by operating as a futuristic tactical program called the Professor (as a homage to Charles Xavier) as well as the space station Graymalkin (which is later reconfigured into Magento's Avalon). The character ultimately takes on the humanoid male appearance of Prosh by overpowering and assimilating the Phalanx.

==== Prosh in other media ====
- A variation of the Professor called the Computer Cube appears in X-Men: The Animated Series, voiced by Maria del Mar (in "Time Fugitives"), and by George Buza (in "Beyond Good and Evil").
  - The Computer Cube appears in the first season of X-Men '97, voiced by Rachel Kimsey.
- The Professor as Graymalkin appears as a non-playable character via support for Cable in Marvel Heroes.

== Protector ==
Protector (Thoral Rul) was the Prime Thoran of Xandar, whose duty was to protect the Xandarian's Living Computers (aka Worldmind). Protector was killed when Nebula's forces wiped out Xandar's population.

== Protégé ==
- Further reading: Protégé at the Comic Book DB (archived from the original); Protégé at the Grand Comics Database

Protégé is a cosmic entity from an alternate future of the Marvel Universe.

The character, created by Jim Valentino, first appeared in Guardians of the Galaxy #15 (August 1991) as the childlike ruler of the Universal Church of Truth of the alternate future of the Guardians of the Galaxy. Valentino modeled him after his son Aaron at seven years old. He is depicted as a superhuman of unlimited potential, with the ability to duplicate not only super-powers, but also the skills of others simply by observing the ability being used.

Later, Protégé uses its abilities to duplicate the powers of the Living Tribunal, nearly usurping its place in Marvel's cosmology. When attempts to defeat Protégé fail, The Living Tribunal states that any and all realities rest on Protégé's shoulders. Protégé itself claims to have become the new One-Above-All. Scathan the Approver, a Celestial, saves all realities by judging against Protégé. The Living Tribunal then absorbs Protégé into itself to prevent him from endangering all realities again.

== Pulsar ==
- First appearance: X-Men #107 (October 1977)
- Created by: Chris Claremont and Dave Cockrum
- Species: Unidentified extraterrestrial race
- Teams: Imperial Guard
- Abilities: Flight; Projection of energy blasts
- Aliases: Impulse

Pulsar, originally named Impulse, is a member of the Shi'ar Imperial Guard. Created by Chris Claremont and Dave Cockrum, the character first appeared in X-Men #107 (October 1977). An energy being in a containment suit, Pulsar is capable of flight and the projection of energy blasts. Like many original members of the Imperial Guard, Pulsar is the analog of a character from DC Comics' Legion of Super-Heroes: in his case Wildfire.

Impulse was amongst the first of the Imperial Guard encountered by the team of superhuman mutants known as the X-Men who sought to rescue Shi'ar empress Lilandra Neramani from her brother D'Ken. Following their emperor's orders, the Guard clashed with the X-Men on a nameless Shi'ar Empire planet and were on the verge of winning when the band of interstellar freebooters known as the Starjammers arrived to turn the tide of battle in the X-Men's favor. After the battle, Lilandra takes over as Majestrix, and the Guard swears allegiance to her. Beginning with the "Infinity" crossover, the character's name is changed to Pulsar.

== Pulse ==
Pulse

Publication information
- Publisher: Marvel Comics
- First appearance: X-Men vol. 2 #173 (September 2005)
- Created by: Peter Milligan (Writer); Salvador Larroca (Artist)

In-story information
- Alter ego: Augustus
- Species: Human mutant
- Team affiliations: X-Men; The 198
- Notable aliases: Gus; Pulsey
- Abilities: Ability to disable superpowers, electronic systems, and telepathic intrusions

Pulse (Augustus) is a character appearing in American comic books published by Marvel Comics. He first appeared in X-Men vol. 2, #173 (September, 2005).

Sometime after having Gambit was not right for her. Mystique's plan to rid Rogue of Gambit involved sowing discord in the couple's romance and, once the pair was soon to be no more, introduce Rogue to Augustus. Mystique and Augustus make their way back to the Xavier Institute and Mystique announces she is joining the X-Men.

Outside of Apocalypse's temple, Mystique suggests that they use Pulse to neutralize Apocalypse; the X-Men argue over the idea. Rogue interrupts, stating that they should ask Augustus if he can do this to Apocalypse. He smiles coyly and replies that he "doesn't know." Later in the issue, Gambit is revealed to be the new Horseman of Death. In his time as a Horseman, Gambit twice attempted to kill Rogue so as to break his ties to his former life. Both times, Pulse saves Rogue by neutralizing Gambit's powers and physically overcoming him. Following the events of Decimation, Augustus he was one of the few mutants to retain his powers and was forcibly relocated to a mutant camp housing the 198 remaining mutants.

Augustus produces a disruptive pulse from his eyes which can disable systems and people, including mutant and non-mutant powers, and scramble electronic systems. His power also creates a masking effect that shields his mind from psychics.

=== Pulse in other media ===
Pulse appears in The Gifted, portrayed by Zach Roerig. The version is a member of the Sentinel Services under the Hound Program.

== Puppy ==
Puppy is a character appearing in American comic books published by Marvel Comics. The character, created by Chris Claremont, first appeared in Fantastic Four vol. 3 #9 (July, 1998).

Allegedly the offspring of Lockjaw, Puppy was a teleporting dog owned by Franklin Richards.

== Purge ==
- Further reading: Purge at the Comic Book DB (archived from the original)

Purge is a fictional mutant in the Marvel Comics Universe. He was created by Chris Claremont and Aaron Lopresti, and his first appearance was in Excalibur vol. 3 #3.

Little is known about Purge before he made his appearance on the desolate island of Genosha. He was one of the few survivors after Cassandra Nova programmed her Wild Sentinels to decimate the island, killing over 16 million mutants. Somehow he found other survivors and allied himself with Unus the Untouchable and his gang. Inside of the gang, he mostly worked with Hub and Hack and the three of them began to doubt if Unus' exclusive, clique-like strategy was the best way. Purge lost his powers following the events of "Decimation".

Before M-Day, Purge had the powers of superhuman strength, agility, and resilience.

== Pyko ==
Pyko is a character appearing in American comic books published by Marvel Comics. The character, created by Bill Mantlo, first appeared in The Incredible Hulk vol. 1 #271 (February 1982).

Pyko is an anthropomorphic turtle living on Halfworld who is the planet's chief toymaker.

=== Pyko in other media ===
Pyko appears in the Guardians of the Galaxy episode "We Are Family", voiced by Brian George. This version is the leader of a resistance against the robots of Halfworld. However, his extreme methods eventually lead the robots to devolve him and every other animal on the planet.
