= Genesis (Marvel Comics) =

Genesis is the alias of three fictional characters in Marvel Comics. The first incarnation is Tyler Dayspring, a mutant and recurring foe of Cable and Wolverine while the subsequent two incarnations are connected to Apocalypse.

== Fictional character biography ==
=== Tyler Dayspring ===
Genesis
- Genesis (Tyler Dayspring) and Cable as depicted in Cable #19 (January 1995). Art by Steve Skroce.

Publication information
- Publisher: Marvel Comics
- First appearance: As Tyler: X-Force #1 (August 1991); As Mr. Tolliver: X-Force #5 (December 1991); As Genesis: Cable #19 (January 1995)
- Created by: Fabian Nicieza (writer); Rob Liefeld (artist)

In-story information
- Alter ego: Tyler Dayspring
- Species: Human mutant
- Team affiliations: Askani Clan Chosen
- Notable aliases: Mr. Tolliver, The Other
- Abilities: Could project solid holograms of memories of others, advanced knowledge of technology

Tyler Dayspring first appeared in a flashback in X-Force #1 (August 1991), and appeared as Mister Tolliver in X-Force #5 (December 1991) and his first appearance as Genesis was in Cable #19 (January 1995). Some sources state that he is Cable's son, while others claim that he is the son of Stryfe.

Tyler is the son of Nathan Summers and Aliya Dayspring, and was born 2,000 years in an alternate future. As a teenager, Tyler is abducted by the villain Stryfe and manipulated into joining his service. He captures Dawnsilk, a friend of Nathan, as a hostage. Seeing no other solution, Nathan shoots Tyler, freeing Dawnsilk. Tyler survives, but is embittered at Nathan for shooting him.

Tyler arrives in the present day and establishes the identity of "Tolliver", a masked merchant. Seeking revenge against his father, now known as Cable, Tyler hires the Six Pack and sends them to battle Stryfe. This mission results in the Six Pack disbanding and most of the members hating Cable afterwards.

Tyler is later revealed to have survived. Now working with Zero, Tyler discovers that Stryfe is a clone of Cable. He reveals this knowledge to Cable who has been possessed by Stryfe. Hurt by this revelation, Stryfe is apparently killed, freeing Cable from his control.

Under his "Genesis" identity, Tyler considers himself an heir of Apocalypse and chooses Wolverine to turn into a Horseman of Apocalypse. He attempts to erase Wolverine's mind and restore the adamantium skeleton, but is unsuccessful. Wolverine reverts to a feral state and kills Genesis.

=== Evan Sabahnur ===
Genesis

Publication information
- Publisher: Marvel Comics
- First appearance: Uncanny X-Force #7 (January 2011); Full appearance: Uncanny X-Force #18 (February 2012)
- Created by: Rick Remender; Esad Ribić

In-story information
- Alter ego: Evan Sabahnur
- Species: Human mutant
- Team affiliations: Jean Grey School; X-Men; X-Tracts
- Notable aliases: Kid Apocalypse; Apocalypse; Death
- Abilities: Self-atomic manipulation; Shapeshifting; Superhuman strength; Enhanced durability

Evan Sabahnur, also known as Kid Apocalypse and Death, was created by Rick Remender and Esad Ribić, and was first seen in Uncanny X-Force #7 (June 2011) and fully appeared in Uncanny X-Force #18 (February 2012).

Evan is a clone of Apocalypse raised by Fantomex in isolation in a secret facility. When the Horseman of Death Archangel ascends to replace Apocalypse, Fantomex unleashes Evan to defeat him. Evan is subsequently enrolled at the Jean Grey School for Higher Learning, marking his first exposure to the outside world. He struggles with his identity, aware of the implications of his connection to Apocalypse. Many of his peers fear him due to his lineage, and Deathlok predicts that Evan may become one of the X-Men's greatest enemies. When Daken and the Brotherhood of Mutants attempt to manipulate him into committing murder, he resists their influence and forms a close bond with Deadpool who seeks to guide and protect Evan.

After spending several years as a student at the school, Evan is affected by the events of the 2014 "AXIS" storyline, in which a spell cast by Doctor Doom and the Scarlet Witch inverts the moral alignments of many heroes and villains. As a result, Evan transforms to more closely resemble Apocalypse and leads the X-Men as his loyal enforcers. However, Deadpool is able to reach Evan and help undo the effects of the spell. Evan adopts the codename "Genesis" and joins the time-displaced X-Men.

In the storyline "Age of X-Man", Genesis is transported to a pocket dimension created by X-Man. In this reality, he is raised by Apocalypse and joins X-Tracts, a group of revolutionaries opposing X-Man's regime. Genesis is mortally wounded by Omega Red in battle and subsequently dies.

=== Genesis (Wife of Apocalypse) ===
Genesis

Publication information
- Publisher: Marvel Comics
- First appearance: Free Comic Book Day 2020 (X-Men/Dark Ages) (September 2020) (drawing); X-Men (vol. 5) #12 (November 2020) (full); As Annihilation: X of Swords: Stasis (December 2020)
- Created by: Jonathan Hickman (writer); Pepe Larraz (artist); Leinil Francis Yu (artist)

In-story information
- Full name: Genesis
- Species: Human mutant
- Team affiliations: Great Ring of Arakko; Swordbearers of Arakko
- Partnerships: Apocalypse (husband); War (daughter); Famine (son); Pestilence (daughter); Death (son); Isca the Unbeaten (sister)
- Notable aliases: Annihilation
- Abilities: Chlorokinesis

The third version of Genesis first appeared in a drawing in Free Comic Book Day 2020 (X-Men/Dark Ages) (September 2020) and made her full debut in X-Men (vol. 5) #12 (November 2020).

Genesis is a mutant who ruled the ancient mutant island of Okkara alongside her husband Apocalypse. Their four children (War, Famine, Pestilence and Death) go on to be the first incarnation of the Horsemen of Apocalypse. When Okkara is invaded by Annihilation and split into Krakoa and Arakko, Genesis seals herself, Arakko, and all of the Okkaran mutants in Amenth to stop the invasion while Apocalypse remains on Earth to build a mutant society strong enough to defeat Amenth's Daemons if they return.

After millennia of fending off the Amenthi hordes and a failed counteroffensive, Genesis is tricked by Annihilation into killing its host, forcing her to claim the Annihilation Helm and be its new host to stop the leaderless Daemons from destroying Arakko.

Genesis, still under Annihilation's influence, begins to believe that the Arakkii mutants have grown weak in her absence. She travels to Arakko and confronts the Great Ring of Arakko and the island's new regent Storm, causing a schism to erupt between its members and inciting a civil war. However, Storm destroys the Annihilation Staff, freeing Genesis from its influence.

== Powers and abilities ==
The third Genesis is an Omega-level mutant with the ability to control and communicate with plant life and fungi in her vicinity. Additionally, Genesis is very long-lived, born thousands of years ago on Okkara. She is an expert at sword combat, skilled enough to rival Apocalypse.

While wearing the Annihilation Helm, Genesis was possessed by the entity Annihilation and granted all of its powers, including control over the dimension of Amenth and its Daemons.

As Annihilation's host, she wielded the Twilight Sword, the blade used to split the landmass of Okkara into the islands of Krakoa and Arakko. The sword is capable of cutting through realities and creating dimensional rifts.

== Reception ==
- In 2018, CBR.com ranked the first Genesis 2nd in their "8 X-Men Kids Cooler Than Their Parents (And 7 Who Are Way Worse)" list.
- In 2020, CBR ranked the second Genesis 3rd in its "10 Most Powerful Clones In Marvel Comics" list.

== In other media ==
=== Television ===
Tyler Dayspring appears in X-Men: The Animated Series, voiced by Stuart Stone.

=== Miscellaneous ===
- An action figure of Tyler Dayspring as Genesis was produced by Toy Biz as part of the X-Men/X-Force line.
- Tyler Dayspring / Genesis appears as a playable character in the HeroClix game system.
