= War (Marvel Comics) =

Marvel Comics fictional character

War is the name of several fictional characters who are supervillains appearing in American comic books published by Marvel Comics. Four members of the Four Horsemen of Apocalypse: Abraham Kieros; the fifteenth-century incarnation (real name unknown); the mutant Gazer; and the First Horseman War. The title has also been held by the Hulk, Deathbird, and Colossus.

== Publication history ==
War (Abraham Kieros) first appeared in X-Factor #11 (December 1986), and was created by Louise Simonson and Walter Simonson. The character subsequently appears in X-Factor #15 (April 1987), #17 (June 1987), #19 (August 1987), #22–25 (November 1987–February 1988), Daredevil #252 (March 1988), X-Factor #26–27 (March–April 1988), X-Factor #84 (November 1992), The Uncanny X-Men #294–295 (November–December 1992), and Wolverine (vol. 2) #147 (February 2000). War appeared as part of the "Apocalypse's Horsemen" entry in the Official Handbook of the Marvel Universe Update '89 #1.

== Fictional character biographies ==
=== Abraham Kieros ===
War
- War, in action. Art by Walter Simonson.

Publication information
- Publisher: Marvel Comics
- First appearance: X-Factor #11 (December 1986)
- Created by: Louise Simonson; Walter Simonson

In-story information
- Alter ego: Abraham Lincoln Kieros
- Species: Human mutant
- Team affiliations: Four Horsemen of Apocalypse
- Abilities: Ability to create explosions through kinetic contact

Abraham Kieros was a young Vietnam War veteran who was paralyzed in combat. He was kept in a hospital and placed in an iron lung, but felt as though he was betrayed and forgotten by his country. Apocalypse appeared to him one day and offered him the ability to move and to get revenge on those who had tossed him aside. He accepted the offer and transformed into the Horseman of War, restoring his mobility.

During the Horsemen's first confrontation with X-Factor, War attempts to lead the group. However, Famine and Pestilence refuse to obey his orders and flew off to do their own business. Soon after, Death takes over leadership. During the attack on Manhattan, War attacks Cyclops and is later teleported back to the ship by Apocalypse, where he fights several more X-Factor members. War is eventually defeated by Iceman. Apocalypse then grabs War and flees.

Later, during the "X-Cutioner's Song" story arc, War attacks Colossus and Iceman, but soon flees after Caliban grabs Jean Grey and Cyclops. Caliban hands the two over to Apocalypse, who is really Mister Sinister in disguise. The X-Men seek out the Horsemen and War is presumably defeated in combat.

Much later, War appears in an hospital, once again paralyzed from the neck down. He has apparently been abandoned by Apocalypse, who stripped him of his powers. Archangel, who had gained newfound powers and had been searching for Kieros, heals him of his wounds, giving him hope to start over with a new life.

=== Gazer ===
Gazer
- Gazer as War, Horseman of Apocalypse. Art by Salvador Larroca.

Publication information
- Publisher: Marvel Comics
- First appearance: X-Men vol. 2 #169 (June 2005)
- Created by: Peter Milligan; Salvador Larroca

In-story information
- Species: Human mutant and Human mutate
- Team affiliations: Four Horsemen of Apocalypse; NASA
- Notable aliases: War
- Abilities: Superhuman strength and physical resistance Optic blasts Ability to absorb radiation

Gazer, before (left) and after his depowering on M-Day

Gazer is a mutant astronaut who was stationed alone on a NASA observation space station, due to the unusual metabolism he possessed as his mutant power, whereby he could absorb harmful radiation and process it to gain sustenance. Gazer lost his powers on M-Day, along with 90% of mutants. Some time later, Gazer was teleported to Apocalypse's ship and forced to battle Dr. Foster, a human archeologist who had stumbled upon Apocalypse's tomb, for the "right" to become War, Horseman of Apocalypse. Gazer would have lost the battle if it were not for Ozymandias, Apocalypse's servant. Ozymandias told Gazer that he would owe him.

As War, Gazer was sent to battle the X-Men and Sentinel Squad O*N*E. Upon returning to Apocalypse's sphinx, he was approached by Ozymandias, who wanted his debt repaid. War, no longer Gazer, did not fulfill his oath and instead revealed the truth to Apocalypse about Ozymandias' treachery. During a heated battle against the X-Men, Ozymandias kills Gazer, taking vengeance on him.

=== 15th century incarnation ===
War

Publication information
- Publisher: Marvel Comics
- First appearance: X-Men: Apocalypse vs. Dracula #1 (February 2006)
- Created by: Frank Tieri; Clayton Henry

In-story information
- Team affiliations: The Riders of the Dark; Four Horsemen of Apocalypse
- Abilities: Superhuman strength Wields dual axes which he throws with remarkable accuracy

Not much is known about this incarnation of War. He was chosen by Apocalypse in the fifteenth century to become his horseman and lead his army, the Riders of the Dark. This army was so fierce and powerful that most people presumed it was just a myth used to scare soldiers before their first battle. It was no myth at all, and it precisely was what people thought it was, fierce and strong. In most of their battles, the only soldier who had to fight was War, who would single-handedly defeat hordes of men just by himself.

In 1459, the Riders of the Dark appeared in Romania where Vlad Ţepeş' army was fighting against the Ottomans and emerged victorious. Unfortunately for Vlad (who would become Dracula), War defeated Dracula's army. The survivors fled for their life, abandoning Dracula on the field who stood his ground and faced War but ultimately fell.

=== War (First Horseman of Apocalypse) ===
War

Publication information
- Publisher: Marvel Comics
- First appearance: Marvel Comics #1000 (October 2019)
- Created by: Jonathan Hickman (writer); Dustin Weaver (artist)

In-story information
- Full name: War
- Species: Human mutant
- Team affiliations: Horsemen of Apocalypse; Swordbearers of Arakko
- Partnerships: Apocalypse (father); Genesis (mother)
- Abilities: Pyrokinesis

War is one of four children of Apocalypse and Genesis, born and raised on Okkara. She and her siblings grow up to be the first Horsemen of Apocalypse and fight against the Brood in Ancient Egypt. When the forces of Amenth invade Earth and split Okkara into Krakoa and Arakko, War, along with her mother, her siblings, all Okkaran mutants, and Arakko, is voluntarily sealed away in Amenth to stop the invasion, while Apocalypse remains on Earth.

After Genesis becomes the host of Annihilation, Arakko is subjugated by the forces of Amenth. War and her siblings are sent to Otherworld to attack Dryador and the Starlight Citadel. When Saturnyne intervenes and arranges the X of Swords tournament, War is chosen as a swordbearer for Arakko.

War's first challenge in the tournament is against Solem in a contest of who can cut off a limb from their opponent first. Solem calls in a favor owed to him by Wolverine, who takes Solem's place in the battle. In the subsequent fight, War outmatches Wolverine, but fails to kill him. Wolverine cuts off War's left hand and wins the challenge, though the victory goes to Arakko since he was standing in for Solem.

When Genesis incites a civil war on Arakko, War joins her mother there and fights against Storm and her allies. After the war ends, War joins her mother and Famine in exile on Phobos.

== Powers and abilities ==
Abraham Kieros is a mutant with the power to create explosions in his immediate area by channeling and amplifying kinetic energy. His primary method of doing so is by clapping his hands.

Gazer is a mutant with the ability to absorb radiation at frequencies and levels which induce radiation sickness in normal humans and photosynthesize it as food. After losing his powers on M-Day, he was taken by Apocalypse and transformed to possess superhuman strength, enhanced durability, and the ability to absorb and channel solar energy as blasts of fire through his eyes. He also carried a spiked mace which flashed with electricity-like bursts and rode a robotic horse-like flying mount.

Apocalypse's daughter is an Omega-level mutant with the power to psionically manipulate air molecules and excite them to create flame. War can channel her pyrokinesis to regenerate her body. War is also very long-lived, having been alive for thousands of years.

== In other media ==
=== Television ===
- The Abraham Kieros incarnation of War appears in X-Men: The Animated Series, voiced by James Millington. Another incarnation of War who served Apocalypse in ancient times made a non-speaking cameo later in the series.
  - Abraham Kieros / War appears in X-Men '97, voiced by Lawrence Bayne.
- An original incarnation of War appears in X-Men: Evolution as Magneto (voiced by Christopher Judge).

=== Film ===
Abraham Kieros / War appears in X-Men: Apocalypse, portrayed by Fraser Aitcheson. This version served Apocalypse in Ancient Egypt. Additionally, a modern version of War is depicted as Magneto.

=== Video games ===
The Hulk as War appears as an alternate design for the Hulk in Marvel Heroes.
