= Apocalypse (character) =

Supervillain appearing in Marvel Comics

En Sabah Nur Apocalypse
- Apocalypse on Ariel Olivetti's variant cover of Cable (vol. 2) #15 (August 2009)

Publication information
- Publisher: Marvel Comics
- First appearance: Unnamed Appearance: Marvel Graphic Novel #17 (July 1985); Cameo appearance: X-Factor #5 (June 1986); Full appearance: X-Factor #6 (July 1986)
- Created by: Louise Simonson (writer); Jackson Guice (artist)

In-story information
- Alter ego: En Sabah Nur
- Species: Human mutant
- Team affiliations: Four Horsemen; Dark Riders; Clan Akkaba; Coven Akkaba; Alliance of Evil; Quiet Council of Krakoa; Swordbearers of Krakoa
- Partnerships: Mister Sinister; Ozymandias; Genesis (wife)
- Notable aliases: The First One; Genesis; En Sabah Nur; Set; Sarau; Kali-ma; Huitzilopochtli; Eternal One; Revelation
- Abilities: See list: Self-Atomic Manipulation (main ability); Shapeshifting; Adaptation; Immortality; Superhuman strength, nigh-invulnerability, stamina, endurance, speed, reflexes, agility, resilience, dexterity and senses.; Genius-level intellect; Force field; Energy and matter manipulation; Flight; Telekinesis; Telepathy; Technopathy; Teleportation; Ability to augment, manipulate, or steal the powers of other mutants and cosmic beings

Apocalypse (En Sabah Nur) is a supervillain appearing in American comic books published by Marvel Comics. He is one of the world's first mutants, and was a principal antagonist for the original X-Factor team and later the X-Men and related spin-off teams. Created by writer Louise Simonson and artist Jackson Guice, Apocalypse first appeared, unnamed, in Marvel Graphic Novel #17 (July 1985), followed by a full debut in X-Factor #5 (June 1986). Apocalypse is one of the most powerful beings in the Marvel Universe and the father of the original incarnation of the Horsemen of Apocalypse.

Since his introduction, the character has appeared in a number of X-Men titles, including spin-offs and several limited series. Apocalypse has also been featured in various forms of non-comics media, including the 2016 feature film X-Men: Apocalypse, in which he was portrayed by Oscar Isaac.

== Conception and creation ==
While writing the first five issues of X-Factor, Bob Layton dropped hints of a villain operating behind the scenes and leading the Alliance of Evil (mentioned in X-Factor #4, May 1986). Layton intended to reveal this character to be the Daredevil villain the Owl on the final page of X-Factor #5. However, Layton left the book after writing this issue and was replaced by writer Louise Simonson. Editor Bob Harras said that the character arose because of storytelling needs: "All I had communicated to Louise was my desire that an A-level, first class character be introduced. I wanted a Magneto-level villain who would up the stakes and give the X-Factor team reason to exist."

In a 2011 interview with The Philadelphia Inquirer, Simonson explained that when the X-Factor series was created, the original five X-Men were pulled out of the purview of Chris Claremont, who was writing The Uncanny X-Men. However, Simonson felt that the series needed an archenemy, or what Simonson called "a big, bad villain", and conceived of Apocalypse. Simonson described the character thus:

When X-Factor was created, it caused a split in the "Mutant World" [and] several seminal characters were pulled out of [writer] Chris Claremont's X-Men. Apocalypse is the first mutant – a brilliant shape-shifter who is virtually immortal – and sees himself as the father of mutantkind. In his early years, which I covered in the X-Factor Forever miniseries... Apocalypse encountered the Celestials and realized there was a time when humanity might be judged unworthy and destroyed. Consequently, he's been using Darwinian principles – survival of the fittest – to kill off the weak and force the survivors to grow stronger, to push humanity to get better and more powerful. He considers himself the Apocalypse of modern man and the father of what humanity will come next – Mutantkind. Where Magneto sees mutants as the next step of evolution and strives to protect all mutants, Apocalypse believes in absolute survival of the fittest – so if the Hulk, for example, is stronger than [the X-Men's] Colossus... well, in Apocalypse's world he would say, 'Bye, bye, comrade.'

Harras also commented, "As soon as I saw the sketch by Walter [Simonson] and heard Louise's take on him, I knew we had the character I wanted. Jackson [Guice] redrew the page, patching in the shadowy Apocalypse where the Owl had been. But the genesis was clearly Walt and Weezie's." Guice admitted to difficulty recalling the details behind redrawing the last page of issue #5: "The best I can remember now is putting his look together pretty much right on the pencil page—just adding bits of costuming business which hinted toward his true appearance when we'd eventually see him in full reveal. I don't believe there was even a character sketch done for him at that point—I planned on making sense of it all later on, but by then I was gone and others had that concern." Apocalypse's silhouette in issue #5 does not match up with his full appearance in issue #6, suggesting the possibility that Guice was using Simonson's sketch as a reference for issue #6 but did not have access to it earlier, necessitating that he come up with his own design for issue #5. Walter Simonson himself has downplayed his role in the character's creation, saying that Guice was responsible for creating the design and that he, Simonson, merely modified it later: "I did not co-create Apocalypse. However, I wish I had. Louise Simonson and Jackson Guice created him. He appeared in a few panels at the end of one of Jackson’s last X-FACTORs, so I am the first artist to use him extensively in stories. And I kind of juiced up his physique a bit."

Bob Harras said on the character of Apocalypse:

He looked fantastic. Also, the name is dynamic. It tells you right off this character means trouble. And he came with a clear-cut agenda: 'survival of the fittest.' He didn't care if you were a mutant—if you were weak, you would be destroyed. He was merciless, but his philosophy was easy to grasp and it fit in with the harder edge of evolution which is part and parcel of the mutant story. Isn't that what humans fear about mutants? That they are the next step? Now, we had given mutants something new to fear: a character who would judge them on their genetic worthiness. [...] To his own mind he wasn't evil (despite his leadership of the Alliance of Evil, which I think we dropped pretty soon after Apocalypse's introduction); he believed he was doing the right thing. He was ensuring evolution. To me, he was the perfect next step in the mutant story.

Although the character first appeared in 1986, he was retroactively said to have been present during previously published stories. The unnamed benefactor of the Living Monolith in Marvel Graphic Novel #17 (1985) was later identified as Apocalypse in disguise. Classic X-Men #25 revealed that years earlier, Apocalypse encountered the terrorist Moses Magnum and granted him superhuman power.

During his run on Cable, Robert Weinberg planned a story to reveal that Apocalypse was the third Summers brother, a mysterious sibling to the mutants Cyclops and Havok. But Weinberg left the book before he could go along with his plan and the third Summers brother was revealed to be the mutant Gabriel Summers, a.k.a. Vulcan.

Apocalypse was the principal adversary in the mid-1980s X-Men spin-off series X-Factor (1986–91) until being apparently killed at the climax of issue #68 (July 1991). Since then, the character has died and been resurrected several times thanks to his power and advanced alien technology. His name En Sabah Nur was revealed in Cable #2 (June 1993) and his birthplace (Egypt) and the origin of his technology, were revealed in X-Force #37 (August 1994). According to Marvel, the name translates from Arabic as "The First One" (although, in reality, the translation is considered grammatically incorrect, as it means "The First/Morning Light" [En-("The") + Sabah- ("Morning") + Nur- ("Light")] ). It is later revealed in the origin story Rise of Apocalypse that he is possibly the first mutant (meaning, in this case, a human being born with the X-gene), born 5,000 years ago. The character gained greater popularity in 1995 when the storyline "Age of Apocalypse" featured an alternate timeline in which Apocalypse has conquered much of Earth.

The character was reincarnated in the pages of Uncanny X-Force #1 as a small boy with no memory of his previous incarnation. The boy was named Evan Sabahnur. In 2012, the adult, villainous version of Apocalypse returned in the series Uncanny Avengers. His origins are further explored in the storyline "Apocalypse Wars".

In 2019, writers Jonathan Hickman and Tini Howard expanded upon Apocalypse's origin and agenda in the Excalibur series and the X of Swords event. Apocalypse's 'survival of the fittest' mentality was revealed to have had the aim of preparing the mutant population for a dangerous reunion with the long-lost mutants of Arakko, which included his wife and four children, the original Horsemen of Apocalypse.

== Fictional character biography ==
=== Rise of Apocalypse ===
En Sabah Nur as featured on the cover of Rise of Apocalypse #1, by Adam Pollina

The being who would later be called Apocalypse is born with the mutant X-gene thousands of years ago in Akkaba, a settlement in ancient Egypt. Because of his grey skin and blue lips, his people abandoned him as an infant. He is rescued by Baal of the Sandstormers, who sees the child's potential power and will to survive. Baal names him En Sabah Nur, which Marvel translates as "The First One". The Sandstormers live by the credo of survival of the fittest, believing that only those who are strong enough to survive hardship and direct conflict are worthy of life. It is also revealed during the Apocalypse Wars that, as a young boy, En Sabah Nur is very generous and selfless, to the chagrin of Baal. A time-displaced Evan Sabahnur and Beast try to save En Sabah Nur, but he allows himself to be captured to help them escape.

Around this time, the time-traveller Kang the Conqueror arrives in Egypt and assumes the identity of Pharaoh Rama-Tut. Knowing who En Sabah Nur is fated to become and where he is, Rama-Tut sends his General Ozymandias and an army to destroy the Sandstormers and find the young Apocalypse. En Sabah Nur and Baal are injured and seek refuge in a cave. Before he dies, Baal reveals advanced alien technology hidden in the cave, left behind by the space gods known as the Celestials. Vowing revenge on Rama-Tut, En Sabah Nur enters the Pharaoh's city posing as a slave and draws the romantic attention of Ozymandias's sister, Nephri. On seeing the mutant's true appearance, Nephri rejects him and turns to her brother for protection. The heartbroken En Sabah Nur's rage causes his mutant abilities to fully emerge. Rampaging, he renames himself Apocalypse. Rama-Tut flees and En Sabah Nur uses the Celestial technology to transform his former tormentor Ozymandias into a blind clairvoyant made of living stone, now enslaved to Apocalypse. As the years pass, Apocalypse finds he no longer ages.

It is revealed in the series S.H.I.E.L.D. that Apocalypse, at some point in the days of ancient Egypt, joined forces with the Brotherhood of the Shield to fend off a Brood invasion. Also present were Imhotep and a man who was either the moon god Khonshu or his first Moon Knight avatar/champion.

=== Early history ===
As the millennia pass, Apocalypse travels around Earth, convincing civilizations that he is a deity (inspiring different myths as a result) and manipulating them into fighting wars. He justifies that this encourages "growth, judgment, and destruction". Apocalypse's progeny become Clan Akkaba. Apocalypse encounters the near-immortal human offshoot race known as Eternals, primarily Ikaris and Sersi, who refer to him as their "Ancient Nemesis". At different points, Apocalypse uses his Celestial technology to enter periods of suspended animation, leaving Akkaba and Ozymandias to act in his stead.

In AD 1013, Apocalypse seeks to destroy the Asgardian Thor, who he knows will cause him trouble in the future, according to information obtained from Rama-Tut, yet the plans are foiled by Odin. In the 12th century, Apocalypse encounters Sersi again while awakening latent mutant powers in a crusader named Bennet du Paris, also known as Exodus. In 1459, Apocalypse defeats Vlad Tepes (Vlad the Impaler) in Romania, who later becomes Dracula.

In 1859, Apocalypse encounters British scientist Nathaniel Essex and learns more about the nature of mutants. Apocalypse uses his Celestial technology to transform Essex into the superhuman being Mister Sinister. He then coerces Sinister and the Hellfire Club into aiding his plans for global conquest, but Sinister concludes that these plans are madness and betrays Apocalypse, forcing him back into hibernation.

In 1897, Count Dracula attacks Clan Akkaba in revenge for his defeat at Apocalypse's hands, forcing Clan Akkaba to revive their master from suspended animation. Apocalypse defeats the vampire again, this time with help from Abraham Van Helsing. Eventually, Apocalypse enters hibernation again, expecting to remain so for possibly two centuries, by which point mutants should be more common on Earth.

=== Modern era ===
After many years of suspended animation, Apocalypse awakens nearly a century earlier than planned due to the arrival of the time-traveling mutant Cable. Apocalypse decides that Earth is ready for further examination and testing. He grants superhuman powers to the terrorist Moses Magnum, who then tests the X-Men and the Avengers. Apocalypse later briefly employs the Alliance of Evil to capture the mutant Michael Nowlan, who can boost the power of other mutants. This plan brings Apocalypse into direct conflict with the first incarnation of X-Factor, when the team consisted of the original X-Men.

Apocalypse then recruits mutants to serve as his personal guard, known as the Four Horsemen. Among them is Warren Worthington III (Angel), whom Apocalypse has corrupted and turned into a cyborg called Death. Warren regains his identity and helps his friends defeat Apocalypse, adopting the new codename Archangel. Apocalypse escapes with his new recruit, Caliban, while X-Factor then takes his Celestial spaceship as a base.

During The Evolutionary War, the High Evolutionary plans to rid Earth of those he feels are preventing evolution. Believing this disrupts the natural order and his own plans, Apocalypse battles the High Evolutionary.

=== Sins of the Futures ===
Apocalypse learns of Sinister's intention to create an adversary powerful enough to destroy him: Nathan Summers, the son of Scott Summers and Madelyne Pryor. Apocalypse, viewing him as a threat and realizing that Nathan's energy is the very energy that awoke him all those months earlier, sends his newly formed group, the Riders of the Storm, to abduct Nathan. Although Apocalypse is severely defeated, the young Nathan is infected with a techno-organic virus and is sent to the future with a woman named Askani to be cured.

In the future, Apocalypse has conquered Earth and ruled until the 39th century. By this time, Apocalypse's body had grown feeble: he becomes aware of the young Nathan's presence in this time, but only succeeds in kidnapping a clone of the child which Askani created. Apocalypse plans to transfer his consciousness and power into the clone's stronger body, but is killed in combat with the real Nathan. Nathan grows up to become the warrior Cable (while his clone grows up to become the mutant terrorist Stryfe) and travels back to the past to prevent Apocalypse's future domination of the planet.

In the present, Apocalypse is prematurely awoken from his regeneration chamber by his Riders (now calling themselves the Dark Riders), who inform their master that his Horsemen have kidnapped Cyclops and Jean Grey, supposedly under his instructions (in actuality, Mister Sinister, who was posing as Apocalypse). When attempting to rejuvenate himself again, Apocalypse is nearly killed by Stryfe, who had arrived in the past to take revenge on Apocalypse. After a battle on the Moon with his former servants, the Dark Riders (who had joined Stryfe), Apocalypse is left for dead by Archangel.

The Dark Riders' new leader, Genesis (the adopted son of Cable, who had traveled to the present to ensure Apocalypse's rise and exact revenge on his father), plans to resurrect Apocalypse by sacrificing the lives of the people in villages neighboring Akkaba. During this time, Wolverine is held captive by Genesis, who attempts to restore Wolverine's lost adamantium skeleton and turn him into a Horseman as a gift for Apocalypse. Wolverine breaks free and kills Genesis along with nearly all of the Dark Riders. Genesis had built a sarcophagus with Apocalypse's likeness, which is empty since Apocalypse had already revived.

=== Further schemes ===
After a long healing slumber, Apocalypse, fully restored, awakens with Ozymandias at his side and quickly learns of the present danger: Onslaught. He observes the conflict between the psionic entity and Earth's heroes with Uatu, who suggests to Apocalypse a course of action: an alliance with the one who hated him the most, Cable. Apocalypse surmises that Onslaught will be most vulnerable through the astral plane and that he needs Cable for transportation to this realm. Once on the astral plane, Apocalypse removes the captive Franklin Richards, greatly weakening Onslaught. The plan succeeds, but is interrupted by the Invisible Woman, who had invisibly accompanied the pair, having suspected Apocalypse's motive in wanting to actually kill her son. However, the reprieve in battle gave Onslaught the time to escape, prolonging the conflict.

Following the events of the Onslaught saga, the Hulk and his human alter ego, Bruce Banner, are split into two separate entities: Hulk now draws upon energy derived from Franklin Richards' pocket universe. Apocalypse recruits the Hulk to become his Horseman, War, with intentions of using the Hulk's nexus-energy to overcome the Celestials. To test this newest recruit, Apocalypse sets War against the New World Order, a shadow cabinet organization that intends to conquer the planet. The New World Order in turn sets the Juggernaut and the Absorbing Man against War, but both are easily defeated. Hulk comes to his senses after injuring his friend, Rick Jones. Despite this apparent setback, the incident is still a victory for Apocalypse as it was a successful testing of newly understood Celestial technology. Apocalypse activates the self-destruct mechanism on the sword of War, which the New World Order had obtained, destroying their headquarters.

The Hellfire Club later awakens Apocalypse's long-hidden Harbinger from its deep sleep: originally a normal man, whom Apocalypse in the 19th century once left to incubate for 100 years. Apocalypse releases his Horseman (Caliban) and his scribe Ozymandias from his possession, to fend for themselves, if they were to survive the coming events. Cable with the Avengers battles the Harbinger, but are unable to stop it. Apocalypse then appears, activating a bomb inside the Harbinger intended to destroy all of New York, but Cable manages to prevent this disaster.

Intending to start an all-out war between the humans and the subterranean-dwelling Deviants as part of his plan to test the strong, Apocalypse sets off nuclear warheads at Lemuria, causing the Deviants to further mutate. Apocalypse launches an attack at San Francisco, using a mentally controlled Deviant, Karkas, now a gigantic monster, that the Eternals are forced to battle. Apocalypse is confronted by his centuries-old foe, Ikaris, who now is a Prime Eternal. Although Apocalypse defeats Ikaris, the Eternal still succeeds in destroying his ship and thwarting his plan.

=== The Twelve ===
Supposedly lost diaries of the mutant seer Destiny surfaced, telling of twelve beings that could defeat Apocalypse once and for all. Various mutants, all listed in the prophecy, are abducted by Apocalypse's Horsemen including a faction of the Skrulls. The Twelve legend was in fact a ruse, orchestrated by Apocalypse himself: once the Twelve are assembled, Apocalypse intended to use them to transform himself into a deity-like entity beyond the Celestials. It is revealed at the end of this story arc that Apocalypse's physical form has been burned out due to the vast amount of energies he has under his control, forcing him to wear a bio-armor (like his future counterpart) and now plans to use Nate Grey as a host body for him to move his energy and consciousness into. The X-Men confront Apocalypse as he is close to merging with Nate, but are unable to stop him. Cyclops pushes Nate out of the way, merging with Apocalypse instead. While the merge is successful, Apocalypse's aim for unlimited power is not and he attempts to complete the transformation by warping reality into various scenarios. Apocalypse hoped to lure the Twelve into empowering him with their energy, but eventually, the mutants realize their true predicament and Apocalypse teleports away.

An amnesiac and powerless cyborg Cyclops regains control of the merged form, but Apocalypse begins to re-emerge. Jean and Cable are alerted to his location in Egypt, where Jean in the end manages to free Cyclops by telepathically tearing out Apocalypse's essence from her husband's body, rendering Apocalypse in an incorporeal astral form, which Cable apparently destroys using his psimitar.

=== 2000s ===
In the aftermath of the 2005 "Decimation" storyline, in which most of the mutants lost their powers, Apocalypse was revealed to be alive and well. The techno-organic virus, with which he long ago infected Cable, was revealed to be the means by which Apocalypse's spirit reconstituted itself. With only a drop of his blood into a vat of organs and blood, the virus rewrote the genetic code of the material within to form a body for Apocalypse. Apocalypse awakes from a slumber in a tomb in Akkaba, recalling:

Across the world—helpless mutants slaughtered. Pogroms. Horror. ...Something has woken me from my slumber. Once, a sudden surge in worldwide mutant power stirred me from a similar sleep. Now—a plummet in global mutant capacity—has opened my eyes.

Apocalypse finds himself on a planet with its mutant population reduced to a fraction of what it had been, only a few hundred remaining out of the millions who populated earth prior to his demise at Cable's hands. Reappearing inside a Sphinx-shaped ship, Apocalypse confronts the X-Men with his newly assembled cadre of Horsemen on the front lawn of the X-Mansion. The Horseman Famine uses his powers to cause an intense feeling of hunger and weakness in the mutants and humans on the institute grounds. Apocalypse offers the mutants an elixir: his own blood, provided they join his side. Bent on becoming the new messiah for mutant-kind, Apocalypse approaches the Earth leaders at the United Nations in New York and issues an ultimatum: humanity would destroy ninety percent of its own population, putting man and mutant on level ground in anticipation of the final conflict when the worthy alone would survive – or Apocalypse would unleash his meta-plague on the planet and obliterate all humanity.

In the end, Apocalypse's horsemen are lost, Ozymandias betrays him, and he is forced to retreat by a combined assault of the X-Men and the Avengers. Ultimately, it is discovered that the Celestials lent their technology to Apocalypse, requiring as payment greater sufferings later. He attempts to embrace death as an escape from his lifelong pact, only to find himself instantly resurrected and hearing a voice: "We cannot let you die. Not yet. It is time Apocalypse… it is time".

=== 2010s ===
Apocalypse's followers, Clan Akkaba, manage to bring about Apocalypse's return, albeit in the form of a child they will indoctrinate. Upon learning of Apocalypse's return, X-Force seeks to kill him, but when they discover he is a child, Psylocke decides to protect him, believing they can rehabilitate him and train him as a force for good. To the shock of the rest of the team, Fantomex fatally shoots the child.

In a 2011 storyline, as X-Force succeed in stopping the Deathloks inside the World, the home of all Weapon projects, it is revealed that Ultimaton, guardian of the World, is keeping watch over an incubating young boy labeled En Sabah Nur, aged 847 days.

During the 2012 storyline "Dark Angel Saga", it is revealed that Apocalypse had fathered a son with Autumn Rolfson and she kept this a secret from Apocalypse out of fear of what he would do to him. At the end of the storyline, it is revealed that Fantomex creates a clone Apocalypse which he helps raise to the age of a teenager in an artificial world, where the clone knows Fantomex as the kindly "Uncle Cluster" who taught him to use his abilities for good. The boy, code-named Genesis, helps X-force fight Archangel and when the battle is over, Fantomex enrolls him in the Jean Grey School for Higher Learning.

=== Degeneration ===
After degenerating into an ape-like form, he is taken out by his previous human test subjects who, unlike him, have ascended in form after being empowered by Apocalypse's DNA. He and other apes are tortured with the Finch, which was recovered and repaired by the human test subjects. When test subject D experiments on Apocalypse, he uses the last of his mutant power to try to transfer his mind into D and is finally able to possess him, which restores Apocalypse to his former glory.

Apocalypse was soon afterward captured by a mysterious force – later to be revealed as X-Man, Nate Grey.

=== Dawn of X ===
During "Dawn of X", Apocalypse accepts Xavier's invitation to enter Krakoa and even is among the Quiet Council, a group of fourteen powerful and experienced mutants who serve as the island's lawgivers. He takes up learning magic and acts as an advisor to the new Excalibur team. Mutants who lost their powers after M-Day can regain them by dying and undergoing Krakoan resurrection. To prevent mass suicide by depowered mutants in order to regain their powers, the Quiet Council of Krakoa devised the Crucible, a trial by combat where a depowered mutant must endure grueling physical and psychological attacks from Apocalypse before they can die and be resurrected.

=== Fall of X ===
Following Orchis' attack during the "Fall of X", Apocalypse returns to Krakoa and finds it dying due to a lack of mutant energy. Wrongslide and several other mutants offer themselves up as sacrifices, with Apocalypse killing them to replenish Krakoa's energy.

When Krakoa's Atlantean half returns from the White Hot Room and merges with its Pacific half, Apocalypse arrives on Krakoa and takes down Exodus, who objected to Krakoa leaving for the White Hot Room. Upon learning that Krakoa has no need for Apocalypse's ways anymore, Apocalypse goes on the attack and fights the X-Men until Jean talks him down. Upon seeing through the eyes of the mutants on Krakoa, Apocalypse leaves for Arakko. Meeting up with Orc, Apocalypse states that it is time for him to find an heir to his legacy. Apocalypse eventually selects Doug Ramsey as his heir, with Doug taking the new name Revelation.

== Powers and abilities ==
Apocalypse is an ancient mutant who further augmented himself after merging with Celestial technology gaining in the process a variety of superhuman abilities. He is also among the rare subspecies of mutants that possess the additional gift of immortality. He has total control over the atoms of his body which enables him to alter his form as it suits him, such as allowing his body to become extremely malleable and flexible, enhance his physical abilities, transform his limbs into weapons, wings, or jets, regenerate from fatal injuries, generate a wide range of powers at will, and adapt his body to apparently any disease or hostile environment. He can also project and absorb energy; and is capable of telekinesis, telepathy, teleportation, forcefield generation, and technopathy. Thanks to the aid of his mutant abilities allowing him complete control over his body, special "regeneration" chambers, Celestial technology, and changing bodies, Apocalypse has further enhanced his abilities and now he can generate almost any mutant power at his will.

Aside from his superhuman powers, Apocalypse is extraordinarily intelligent with knowledge in various areas of science and technology, including physics, engineering, genetics, and biology, all of which are more advanced than conventional science. Apocalypse has knowledge of Celestial technology that he uses for his own applications, such as altering mutants or humans. Apocalypse is also a skilled demagogue and a master strategist.

Apocalypse's blood can heal other mutants, but is fatal for humans. Apocalypse's blood can also restore his de-powered mutant descendants; a large dose of Apocalypse's blood regenerated Chamber's body and transformed him to resemble Apocalypse.

== Reception ==
- In 2017, WhatCulture ranked Apocalypse 1st in their "10 Most Evil X-Men Villains" list.
- In 2018, CBR.com ranked Apocalypse 1st in their "Age Of Apocalypse: The 30 Strongest Characters In Marvel's Coolest Alternate World" list.
- In 2018, CBR.com ranked Apocalypse second in their "20 Most Powerful Mutants From The '80s" list.

== Other versions ==
Apocalypse, as depicted in the pages of X-Men Alpha (February 1995), during the "Age of Apocalypse" storyline. Art by Roger Cruz.

Many alternate universe versions of Apocalypse have appeared throughout the character's publication history.

- The series "Age of Apocalypse" takes place in an alternate universe where Professor X was inadvertently killed by Legion, causing Apocalypse to attack ten years earlier than expected and take over Earth.
- In "House of M", Apocalypse is the ruler of North Africa until he is killed by Black Bolt.
- In "Messiah War", Apocalypse is attacked by Stryfe and Bishop and is greatly weakened until he is rejuvenated by Archangel.
- In the Ultimate Marvel universe, Mister Sinister is transformed into Apocalypse and attacks the X-Men until Apocalypse is expelled from his host's body by the Phoenix Force.

== See also ==
- List of Marvel Comics characters
- Bibliography of Apocalypse
