= Omega-level mutants =

Fictional classification of mutant appearing in Marvel Comics

Omega-level mutants are a subset of mutants appearing in American comic books published by Marvel Comics with the most powerful potential of their mutant abilities.

== Publication history ==
In August 1986, the term was first introduced by Chris Claremont in Uncanny X-Men #208 as "Class Omega", but was not explained except referring to an exceptional level of power. It was first used to describe Rachel Summers' powers on which Nimrod reported that "upper limit of target-subject's abilities has yet to be determined."

The term was not seen again until the 2001 limited series issue X-Men Forever #3, where Professor X described Iceman and Marvel Girl's "omega level mutant abilities" having unlimited potential. For a time, no firm definition was offered in the comics and the term "omega-level mutant" was simply used whenever a writer wanted audience to know that the character was both important and powerful (See inconsistency). This led several conflicting opinions and debates among fans as to who or what qualified as omega-level.

In July 2019, during X-Men relaunch of the Krakoan Age, Jonathan Hickman provided an official definition in House of X #1 and listed fourteen omega-level mutants alongside their respective omega power.

In November 2020, a new status quo for Powerhouse, who was considered an omega-level mutant, was established that he was not a mutant in Fantastic Four (vol. 6) #26. Then X-Men's senior editor Jordan White had disagreed with this decision and the change was made due to character's affiliation with Fantastic Four. However, in March 2024, Marvel Comics reinstated his previous status as omega-level mutant by revealing that he was repressing his powers.

After the X of Swords event in 2020, a large number of omega-level mutants were introduced as members of the Great Ring of Arakko. These mutants were not explored until X-Men Red (vol. 2) (2022) by Al Ewing, who also established the fact that "a battle between omega-level mutants is all about versatility, not just raw power."

In January 2022, it was revealed that mutants can enhance (at least to some extent) their power to omega-level by further training, as Synch had shown potential to achieve omega-level status in X-Men (vol. 6) #7.

== Definition ==
Definition given by Jonathan Hickman [emphasis in original]:

Omega Level Mutant: A mutant whose dominant power is deemed to register – or reach – an undefinable upper limit of that power's specific classification.

For Example: Both Magneto and Forge are the most powerful mutants of their power types on the planet Earth [Magnetism and Technopathy, respectively], but what makes Magneto, and not Forge, an Omega level mutant is that the upper limit of Forge's measurable powers could hypothetically be surpassed [and, in fact, has by multiple humans on the planet], while the upper limit of Magneto's power cannot be surpassed in any measurable fashion.

Note: Omega level is a classification of a single mutant power. While it is quite common that mutants manifest multiple powers, only one is normally of Omega level.

For Example: While Jean Grey is both a telepath and a telekinetic, she is only an Omega level telepath.

— House of X #1 (July 2019)

Multiple mutants can achieve the upper limit of a power at the same time on which Jordan White stated that he did not believe there is anything in the definition that said there can be only one.

For Example: Both Kid Omega and Jean have the highest upper limit for telepathy that there could be possible.

== Known omega-level mutants ==
Character	Omega power	Issue
Iceman (Bobby Drake)	Negative temperature manipulation	X-Men Forever #3 (January 2001)
Marvel Girl (Jean Grey)	Telepathy	X-Men Forever #3 (January 2001)
Kid Omega (Quentin Quire)	Telepathy	New X-Men #135 (December 2002)
Elixir (Joshua Foley)	Biokinesis	New Mutants (vol. 2) #12 (January 2004)
Vulcan (Gabriel Summers)	Energy manipulation	X-Men: Deadly Genesis #1 (November 2005)
Powerhouse (Franklin Richards)	Universal reality manipulation	X-Men: The 198 Files #1 (January 2006)
Mister M (Absolon Mercator)	Matter manipulation	X-Men: The 198 Files #1 (January 2006)
Storm (Ororo Munroe)	Weather manipulation	Black Panther (vol. 4) #21 (October 2006)
Legion (David Haller)	Power manifestation	New Mutants (vol. 3) #4 (August 2009)
Hope Summers	Power manipulation	X-Men Phoenix Force Handbook #1 (July 2010)
Monarch (Jamie Braddock)	Quantum reality manipulation	House of X #1 (July 2019)
Magneto (Max Eisenhardt)	Magnetism manipulation	House of X #1 (July 2019)
Proteus (Kevin MacTaggert)	Psionic reality manipulation	House of X #1 (July 2019)
Exodus (Bennet du Paris)	Telekinesis	House of X #1 (July 2019)
Genesis	Chlorokinesis	X-Men (vol. 5) #16 (December 2020)
Idyll the Future Seer	Precognition	X-Men (vol. 5) #16 (December 2020)
Isca the Unbeaten	Unbeatable	X-Men (vol. 5) #16 (December 2020)
Lactuca the Knower	Universal spatial awareness	X-Men (vol. 5) #16 (December 2020)
Lodus Logos	Ferro-crafter, speaks metal into existence	X-Men (vol. 5) #16 (December 2020)
Ora Serrata	Not specified	X-Men (vol. 5) #16 (December 2020)
Sobunar of the Depths	Not specified	X-Men (vol. 5) #16 (December 2020)
Tarn the Uncaring	Biological manipulation	X-Men (vol. 5) #16 (December 2020)
Xilo the First Defender	Not specified	X-Men (vol. 5) #16 (December 2020)
Nameless, the Shape-Shifter Queen	Not specified	X-Men Red (vol. 2) #1 (April 2022)
Uqesh the Bridge	Not specified	Legion of X #1 (May 2022)
White Sword (Blue)	Healing	X-Men Red (vol. 2) #12 (June 2023)
Kobak Never-Held	Not specified	X-Men Red (vol. 2) #13 (July 2023)
Lycaon Two Wolves	Not specified	X-Men Red (vol. 2) #13 (July 2023)
Orrdon	Not specified	X-Men Red (vol. 2) #14 (August 2023)
Death	Not specified	X-Men Red (vol. 2) #16 (October 2023)
Famine	Hydrokinesis	X-Men Red (vol. 2) #16 (October 2023)
Pestilence	Disease vector	X-Men Red (vol. 2) #16 (October 2023)
War	Pyrokinesis	X-Men Red (vol. 2) #16 (October 2023)
Forge (Note: Forge created a machine that allowed him to reach omega-level while using it.)	Technopathy	X-Force (vol. 7) #1 (July 2024)
Professor X (Charles Xavier)	Telepathy	X-Men (vol. 7) #13 (March 2025)
Maggott (Japheth)	Psychometry	Storm (vol. 5) #6 (March 2025)

== Inconsistency ==
Many characters were previously termed as Omega-level mutants or having omega-level abilities: Betsy Braddock, Cable, Rachel Summers, and White Queen were excluded from being Omega-level mutants despite being the members of Krakoan Age. However, the status of Hyperstorm, Vulcan, Stryfe, and X-Man remained unconfirmed after the establishment of definition. As the Krakoan, Julian Keller declared himself Omega-level.

== Reception ==
In April and July 2019, Charles Pulliam-Moore from Gizmodo and Thomas Bacon respectively had highlighted the challenges that might come with classifying Omega-level mutants. Pulliam-Moore stated that Omega-level mutants are singled out for being unique but there are also characters with similar powers to them and challenges might come for writers to imagine things when questions would be asked what can these mutants can do when they are at their upper limit. While Bacon wrote in Screen Rant that a writer writes any superhero as very powerful which could be pointed by fans to add their favourite character into the ranks of Omega-level mutants and writers might come under immense pressure from it.

Regarding Omega-level mutant classification, Amer Sawan of CBR in April 2023, commented that one downside to it was that the system to classify Omega-level mutants changes frequently with constantly shifting nature of the powers and due to this, some mutants who had done incredible things with their powers would lack recognition for being denied the status of omega-level.

In May 2024, Robert Wood of Screen Rant hinted the possibility of the 'Omega Level' label being altered after the end of Krakoan Age as House of X's definition was defined by the in-universe nation of Krakoa. He also commented that even with flaws, a set of rules was created by Marvel Comics for writers to play, challenge and redefine; encouraging the kind of 'logic puzzle' on which superhero stories thrives.

== In other media ==
In Deadpool & Wolverine, Cassandra Nova is referred as an Omega-level mutant by the Time Variance Authority.
