= Horsemen of Apocalypse =

Team of Marvel Comics supervillains

Publication information
- Publisher: Marvel Comics
- First appearance: X-Factor #15 (April 1987)
- Created by: Louise Simonson; Walt Simonson

In-story information
- Member(s): Death: Death (1st incarnation); Death (11th c. incarnation); Warren Worthington III; Caliban; Wolverine; Professor X Gambit; Psylocke; Sanjar Javeed; Storm; Banshee; Daken; Grim Reaper; Sentry Famine: Famine (1st incarnation); Famine (11th century incarnation); Autumn Rolfson; Ahab; Sunfire; Jeb Lee; Pestilence: Pestilence (1st incarnation); Pestilence (11th century incarnation); Plague; Caliban; Polaris; Ichisumi; Spider-Man; War: War (1st incarnation); War (11th century incarnation); War (19th century incarnation); Abraham Kieros; Hulk; Deathbird; Gazer; Decimus Furius; Colossus Apocalypse: En Sabah Nur

The Horsemen of Apocalypse are a team of supervillains appearing in American comic books published by Marvel Comics. Led by Apocalypse, they are loosely based on the Biblical Four Horsemen of the Apocalypse from the Book of Revelation, though its members vary throughout the canon.

Members of the Horsemen of Apocalypse appeared in the 2016 film X-Men: Apocalypse.

== Publication history ==
The Horsemen of Apocalypse are first mentioned in X-Factor #10 (Nov. 1986), and make their full appearance in X-Factor #15 (April 1987). They were created by writer Louise Simonson and artist Walt Simonson.

== Fictional biography ==
The group consists of four individuals (usually mutants) that have been genetically altered and mentally conditioned to serve the ancient mutant, Apocalypse, either willingly or forcibly. They are enhanced or endowed with new abilities, and are always given the same titles based upon the biblical Four Horsemen: Death, Famine, Pestilence (replacing the biblical Conquest), and War. While Apocalypse has empowered other individuals to do his bidding, the Four Horsemen remain his elite minions, always playing a key role in his plans.

=== The First Horsemen ===
Thousands of years ago, Apocalypse and his wife Genesis ruled the sentient island Okkara, home to a thriving mutant civilization. They had four children, each named after tribulations absent in Okkara: War, Famine, Pestilence, and Death. When the forces of Amenth invaded Earth and split Okkara into Krakoa and Arakko, the Horsemen, along with Genesis, the rest of the Okkaran mutants, and the newly created island of Arakko, were voluntarily sealed away in Amenth to stop the invasion while Apocalypse remained on Earth to build a mutant society strong enough to repel the Amenthi Daemons when they returned.

=== 11th century incarnation ===
Apocalypse assembled a new incarnation of the Horsemen during the 11th century. For Pestilence, Apocalypse recruited Phantom Bats, a mutant with wings in place of arms and the ability to emit red bats that immolate anything they touch. For the role of Famine, Apocalypse chose an unnamed Native American who rides an undead flying bear. For the role of War, Apocalypse recruits an unnamed mutant who resembles a mummy and rides a horse who has bat-like wings. For the role of Death, Apocalypse recruits a mutant who possesses a gaseous body and wears a full-body cloak. Thor comes to Logan's aid and kills the Horsemen of Apocalypse single-handedly.

=== First modern incarnation ===
==== Fall of Mutants ====
The original Four Horsemen of Apocalypse. Panel from X-Factor #24. Art by Walt Simonson.

In the 20th century, Apocalypse recruits Plague, a member of the Morlocks, to fill the role of Pestilence. He approaches ex-soldier Abraham Kieros and grants him the position of War. An anorexic girl named Autumn Rolfson is Apocalypse's third choice and becomes Famine. Apocalypse recruits Angel after saving him from a plane crash, making him the Horseman of Death. Angel becomes Archangel and is given metallic wings to replace his original wings, which had been amputated.

The Four Horsemen are forced to battle one another for leadership and Death emerges victorious. In their first battle against X-Factor, the Horsemen were nearly defeated until Death appeared, shocking his former comrades. While X-Factor is strapped down, the Four Horsemen are sent out by Apocalypse to destroy New York City. Meanwhile, Caliban confronts Apocalypse and asks for power to avenge his fellow Morlocks.

X-Factor frees themselves and take on the Four Horsemen; Pestilence is accidentally killed by Power Pack in the battle and Archangel comes back to his senses after assuming he killed his former comrade Iceman. Apocalypse retreats with his remaining Horsemen and Caliban.

==== X-Cutioner's Song ====
While Apocalypse heals from his recent defeat on the moon, Mister Sinister disguises himself as Apocalypse and orders the Horsemen War, Famine, and Caliban, who was transformed by Apocalypse and replaced Angel as Death, to capture Jean Grey and Cyclops. The X-Men later defeat the Horsemen when they discover their hideout.

==== Hulk ====
After a battle with the X-Men in their mansion, the Hulk is taken by Apocalypse and becomes the new incarnation of War. Apocalypse sets the Hulk against the Juggernaut to test the latter's strength. The Hulk overcomes the Juggernaut after being empowered by energy from Franklin Richards's "Heroes Reborn" pocket universe. He likewise overloads Absorbing Man, but comes to his senses after injuring Rick Jones.

=== Second incarnation ===
==== The Twelve ====
Second incarnation of the Four Horsemen: War (Deathbird), Pestilence (Caliban) and Famine (Ahab). Panel from X-Men #97. Pencils by Alan Davis.

During "The Twelve" saga, Apocalypse selects a new group of Horsemen to collect the chosen mutants written in Destiny's diary. This group consists of Ahab as Famine, Deathbird as War, Caliban as Pestilence, and Wolverine as Death.

When Death captures Mikhail Rasputin and fails to teleport out with him, he is chased into the Morlock tunnels by the X-Men. He battles them and regains his memory thanks to the efforts of Jubilee, Shadowcat, Archangel, and Psylocke. The rest of the Horsemen are teleported to another dimension by Rasputin.

=== Third incarnation ===
==== Blood of Apocalypse ====
Following the House of M and M-Day, Apocalypse resurrected, assembling a new cadre of Horsemen with the purpose of wiping out 90% of the baseline human population. Apocalypse's new Horsemen were Gazer as War, Sunfire as Famine, Polaris as Pestilence, and Gambit as Death.

=== The Final Horsemen ===
Centuries prior, Apocalypse created what he referred to as his "Final Horsemen". This cadre of Horsemen was assembled one by one through time by Apocalypse and Ozymandias and would only be awoken when all other approaches had failed. They comprise the following members:

- Decimus Furius (War) is a mutant who originates from ancient Rome and possesses a Minotaur-like appearance. He was found by Apocalypse and Ozymandias and appointed as War. War's axe psionically infects all it touches with a berserker rage and a cold thirst for destruction.
- Sanjar Javeed (Death) is the bastard son and servant of Shapur II, king of the Sasanian Empire. Javeed is able to spread disease through metal, with the effects of his powers varying depending on the metal used.
- Jeb Lee (Famine) is a Confederate spy who fought during the American Civil War disguised as a Union drummer. Lee's powers are channeled through sound, attacking the flesh of those who hear it.
- Ichisumi (Pestilence) is a geisha who comes from 19th-century Kumamoto, Japan.
- Psylocke briefly replaces Sanjar Javeed as Death.

=== Fifth incarnation ===
==== The Four Horsemen of Death ====
Banshee, Daken, Grim Reaper, and Sentry are resurrected by the Apocalypse Twins and are each sent after a key member of the Avengers Unity Squad that they have some personal ties to. The Avengers Unity Squad are overpowered by the Horsemen, but undo their victory by transferring their minds into the body of their past selves after the Horsemen's victory. This provides Rogue with sufficient power to force the Celestial Executioner away while her teammates confront Daken, Grim Reaper, and Banshee. After Sentry is freed from his Horseman programming, he takes the Celestial Executioner into deep space. Daken and Grim Reaper escape, while Banshee ends up in the X-Men's custody.

== Other versions ==
=== Age of Apocalypse ===
The Four Horsemen in the "Age of Apocalypse".

An alternate universe iteration of the Horsemen of Apocalypse appears in Age of Apocalypse, initially consisting of Candra, Gideon, Death, and War. Later members include Abyss, Bastion, Maximus, Holocaust, Mikhail Rasputin, and Mister Sinister, with Maximus serving as Death's successor.

=== Cable & Deadpool ===
An alternate universe iteration of the Horsemen of Apocalypse appears in the Cable & Deadpool story arc "Enema of the State", consisting of Spider-Man as Pestilence, Blob as Famine, Archangel as Death, and Cable as War.

=== Exiles ===
One of the original members of the Exiles was Thunderbird of Earth-1100, who was transformed into Apocalypse's Horseman of War. He manages to break through Apocalypse's mind control and rejoin his allies, the X-Men.

=== Horsemen of Salvation ===
The Horsemen of Salvation are a counterpart to the Horsemen of Apocalypse. The group is led by Nate Grey and consists of Magneto as the Horseman of Peace, Angel as the Horseman of Life, Blob as the Horseman of Bounty, and Omega Red as the Horseman of Wellness. After Psylocke releases Angel from Grey's control, Grey brainwashes Storm to become the Horseman of Life.

=== Last Horsemen of Apocalypse ===
An alternate universe iteration of the Horsemen of Apocalypse appears in House of X, consisting of Wolverine as War, Xorn as Death, North (a hybrid clone of Polaris and Emma Frost) as Pestilence, and Krakoa (who had taken over Cypher's corpse) as Famine. This version of the group are among the last surviving mutants and were assembled by Apocalypse after humanity united with the Sentinels to form the Man-Machine Ascendancy.

== In other media ==
=== Television ===
- The first modern incarnation of the Horsemen of Apocalypse appear in X-Men: The Animated Series, consisting of Autumn Rolfson / Famine, Plague / Pestilence, Abraham Kieros / War, and Archangel. This version of the group were brainwashed by Apocalypse's subordinate Mystique, who swayed them with the offer of a "mutant cure".
- The Horsemen of Apocalypse appear in X-Men: Evolution, consisting of Professor X / Death, Magneto / War, Storm / Famine, and Mystique / Pestilence.
- Various incarnations of the Horsemen of Apocalypse appear in the second season of X-Men '97. Abraham Kieros / War and Gambit / Death appear in the present, while the Final Horsemen of Apocalypse appear in the future.

=== Film ===
- The original incarnation of the Horsemen of Apocalypse make a cameo appearance in the post-credits scene of X-Men: Days of Future Past.
- Two incarnations of the Horsemen of Apocalypse appear in X-Men: Apocalypse. The original incarnation consists of Pestilence (portrayed by Warren Scherer) who possesses sharpened teeth and superhuman strength; Famine (portrayed by Rochelle Okoye) who possesses pyrokinesis; Death (portrayed by Monique Ganderton) who possesses telekinesis, mind-control, and shield generation; and War (portrayed by Fraser Aitcheson) who can disintegrate skin and muscle. In the present, Apocalypse recruits Storm, Psylocke, Archangel, and Magneto.

=== Video games ===
- The Horsemen of Apocalypse appear in Marvel Super Heroes vs. Street Fighter, with Cyber-Akuma / Death as a prominent member.
- The Horsemen of Apocalypse appear in X-Men Legends II: Rise of Apocalypse, consisting of Abyss, Mikhail Rasputin, Holocaust, and Archangel. Additionally, the original group appear as statues that get brought to life later in the game.
- The Horsemen of Apocalypse appear in Marvel: Avengers Alliance, consisting of X-23 / War, Rogue / Famine, Beast / Pestilence, and Iceman / Death.
- The Horsemen of Apocalypse appear in Marvel Contest of Champions, consisting of Psylocke, Gambit, Wolverine, and Archangel.
- The Horsemen of Apocalypse appear in Marvel Heroes, consisting of Psylocke / War, Storm / Pestilence, Magik / Famine, and Jean Grey / Death.
- The Horsemen of Apocalypse appear in Marvel Strike Force, consisting of Archangel / Death, Red Hulk / War, Morgan le Fay / Pestilence, and Rogue / Famine.
- The Horsemen of Apocalypse appear in Marvel Realm of Champions, consisting of Archangel / War, Psylocke / Plague, Magneto / Death, and Storm / Famine. This version of the group each rule over lands named after their Horsemen designation.
- The Horsemen of Apocalypse appear in Marvel Rivals, with Jubilee as Famine.
- The Horsemen of Apocalypse appear in Marvel's Wolverine, with Wolverine revealed to have previously served as the Horseman of Death. Following his defeat by Wolverine, Sabretooth finds Apocalypse, who names him the Horseman of War.
