= Caliban (Marvel Comics) =

Marvel Comics fictional character

- Caliban in The Uncanny X-Men #488 (Sept. 2007); art by Salvador Larroca.

Publication information
- Publisher: Marvel Comics
- First appearance: Uncanny X-Men #148 (August 1981)
- Created by: Chris Claremont; Dave Cockrum

In-story information
- Species: Human mutant
- Team affiliations: X-Force; X-Men; The 198; Horsemen of Apocalypse; X-Factor; Morlocks
- Notable aliases: Pestilence; Hellhound; Hound; Death
- Abilities: Pre-alteration: Sensing and tracking other mutants; Terror empowerment; Sensing and manipulating fears; Apocalypse enhancements: Body augmentation; Formerly: Shadow power; Claws and fangs; Invulnerability; Psychoactive virus generation

Caliban is a fictional character appearing in American comic books published by Marvel Comics. He first appeared in The Uncanny X-Men #148 (August 1981), by writer Chris Claremont and artist Dave Cockrum. A mutant with the ability to sense other mutants, he was originally a member of the Morlocks. He was also a member of the X-Factor, X-Men, X-Force and The 198. He was chosen twice by Apocalypse as one of the Horsemen of Apocalypse, first as Death and the second time as Pestilence, and Apocalypse also enhanced his superpowers through genetic manipulation.

The character was portrayed in film by Tómas Lemarquis in X-Men: Apocalypse (2016) and his alternate older version by Stephen Merchant in Logan (2017).

== Publication history ==
Caliban's first appearance was in Uncanny X-Men #148 (Aug. 1981), written by Chris Claremont and illustrated by Dave Cockrum.

== Fictional character biography ==
He is born an albino mutant with a pale complexion and large yellow eyes. At some point in his life, he is banished from his home by his father, who called him Caliban, after a character from the play The Tempest by William Shakespeare.

Caliban is discovered by the mutant Callisto and taken under her wing. Learning of his mutant tracking ability, Callisto uses Caliban to locate other disenfranchised mutants and organizes them into the Morlocks.

Caliban, in his original form, with Kitty Pryde. From Uncanny X-Men #169 (May 1983); art by Paul Smith and Bob Wiacek.

Shortly thereafter, Callisto desires a consort and has the Morlocks abduct Angel to be her husband. The X-Men arrive in the sewers to rescue their ally, and Kitty Pryde is infected with a virus by Plague. Caliban takes her to his quarters to care for her. Kitty pleads with Caliban to allow her to assist her teammates. Caliban agrees, but only if she will return after the fight and stay with him. Though Kitty promises to stay with him forever, she leaves and returns home.

Callisto, vengeful after losing a one-on-one battle with Storm, has the Morlocks kidnap Kitty to force her to marry Caliban, knowing Storm would return. Caliban realizes that Kitty does not truly love him and releases her.

=== X-Factor ===
During the Morlock massacre, X-Factor rescues Caliban from the Marauders, who he swears vengeance upon. With nowhere else to stay, Caliban moves to X-Factor's headquarters with several other surviving Morlocks. Shortly thereafter, Rictor goes missing and Caliban volunteers to help X-Factor find him, officially joining the group.

=== Horseman of Apocalypse ===
Apocalypse kidnaps the X-Factor team after transforming Angel into Death. Caliban, intrigued by Apocalypse's transformation of Angel, betrays X-Factor and asks Apocalypse to do the same to him. Agreeing, Apocalypse promises to give Caliban enough power to gain revenge against the Marauders. Through genetic manipulation, Caliban becomes the second Horseman of Apocalypse known as Death.

=== X-Force ===
Caliban overcomes Apocalypse's control at the cost of his mental faculties. Though mentally unwell, he retains enormous physical power and befriends Cable, who invites him to join his team X-Force. Some time later, Apocalypse returns and transforms Caliban into his new Horseman, Pestilence. Apocalypse augments Caliban's physical power even more and gives him the ability to spread telepathic disease

After Apocalypse is merged with Cyclops, Caliban tracks down Cyclops. He is freed from his service shortly before Cable destroys Apocalypse's spirit. Released from his servitude to Apocalypse, Caliban once more reverts to his childlike state, although he retains the monstrous physique he attained through Apocalypse's machinations.

=== Post M-Day ===
After M-Day, Caliban appears at the Xavier institute as a member of the 198, an alliance of the remaining mutants. He helps the 198 escape with Domino and Shatterstar to a secret base in the Nevada desert. The original X-Men team attempts to retrieve the 198, but are stopped by Bishop's team. After a short battle, the two sides team up and, thanks to a joint effort by Cyclops and Bishop, free the 198.

=== Messiah Complex and Death ===
Caliban becomes part of a strike-force, who are in search of Hope Summers, the first mutant to be born since the Decimation. During a battle with Lady Deathstrike and the Reavers, Caliban sacrifices himself to save Warpath by jumping into the path of a line of bullets meant for him.

=== Dawn of X ===
During the Krakoan Age, Caliban is revived by the Five on Krakoa. Following the end of the Krakoan Age, Caliban returns to the Morlocks. He becomes a leading member of the group and inducts Anole into its ranks.

== Powers and abilities ==
Caliban is a mutant with the ability to psionically sense other mutants out to several miles away and track their movement. He also has the uncontrolled ability to psionically sense, absorb, and turn the psionic energy of fear radiated by humans against them, inducing more intense fear within their minds. He can also utilize fear from others to boost his strength to a level sufficient to easily overpower Spider-Woman.

As Death, he attained superhuman strength, speed, agility, reflexes, coordination, balance, endurance, claws and fangs as well as imperviousness to physical injury through Apocalypse's genetic manipulation. He also is a skilled climber and possesses superhuman leaping ability. He was also mentally conditioned to attack Apocalypse's former ally Mister Sinister on sight. His fear siphoning abilities had also been augmented and he can now control them as well as cast his power over a much wider net; not only gaining in strength from siphoning the anxiety of others but could harness strengthen and redistribute it in much stronger quantities by force of will.

As Pestilence, Apocalypse gave him the ability to generate a mental plague, a virus that attacks from within on the highest planes of the psyche and breaks down the mental functions of the target.

== Reception ==
In 2014, Entertainment Weekly ranked Caliban 89th in their "Let's rank every X-Man ever" list.

== Other versions ==
=== Age of Apocalypse ===
An alternate universe version of Caliban from Earth-295 appears in Age of Apocalypse. This version is a well-learned, albeit egotistical swordsman who works for Domino until he is killed by Toad.

=== House of M ===
An alternate universe version of Caliban from Earth-58163 makes a cameo appearance in House of M as a member of the Marauders.

=== Ultimate Marvel ===
An alternate universe version of Caliban from Earth-1610 appears in Ultimate X-Men #82. This version is a member of the Morlocks who possesses dark gray skin, a muscular physique compared to his Earth-616 counterpart, and the ability to transform into a hulking monster.

=== X-Factor Forever ===
An alternate universe version of Caliban from Earth-16524 makes a minor appearance in X-Factor Forever #3 as a Horseman of Apocalypse.

== In other media ==
=== Television ===
- Caliban appears in X-Men: The Animated Series, voiced by Norm Spencer. This version is an associate of the Morlocks who briefly served as a member of the Hounds.
- Caliban appears in X-Men: Evolution, voiced by Michael Dobson.

=== Film ===
- Caliban appears in X-Men: Apocalypse, portrayed by Tómas Lemarquis. This version is an underground broker.
- Caliban appears in Logan, portrayed by Stephen Merchant. Years prior, he worked with the Transigen Project to locate mutants until he realized the error of his ways and went into hiding with other mutants. He was later recruited by Logan to help care for Charles Xavier. Caliban is kidnapped by the Reavers, who force him to help them find Logan, Xavier, and Laura. After Xavier is killed, Caliban rebels against his captors and sacrifices himself to allow Logan and Laura to escape.

=== Video games ===
- Caliban appears in X-Men: Destiny, voiced by Bob Glouberman.

=== Merchandise ===
- Caliban in his Horsemen of Apocalypse form received an action figure in Toy Biz's X-Force toy line.
- A Build-A-Figure of Caliban was released in Hasbro's Marvel Legends line.
