= Hounds (comics) =

Fictional comic book characters

Publication information
- Publisher: Marvel Comics
- First appearance: Uncanny X-Men #141 (Jan. 1981)
- Created by: Chris Claremont; John Byrne; John Romita Jr.

In-story information
- Type of organization: Enforcers
- Leader(s): Ahab
- Agent(s): Sabretooth; Rachel Summers; Caliban; Wolverine

Hounds are the name given to several fictional groups of mutant characters appearing in American comic books published by Marvel Comics. The Hounds first appeared in Uncanny X-Men #141 (1981). They are mutants from a dystopian alternate future, brainwashed to hunt and capture other mutants for imprisonment in government internment camps.

== History ==
=== Days of Future Past ===
The Hounds were first introduced in Uncanny X-Men, from the "Days of Future Past" dystopian timeline, as part of the backstory of Rachel Summers. These brainwashed mutant hunters were created and commanded by the cyborg Ahab, who used them to hunt down and imprison mutants in concentration camps. Summers was forced to become one of these Hounds while still an adolescent, which scarred and haunted her for years afterward. Eventually she broke her conditioning and rebelled. As a result, she was sent to the camps herself as punishment.

=== Shadow King's Hounds ===
Shadow King is later seen to use mind-controlled humans called Hounds to track Storm, who had been transformed into a child by Nanny. These Hounds were reduced to a nearly mindless, animalistic state by the Shadow King, apparently for his own amusement.

=== Orchis' Hounds ===
Adrian Toomes is recruited into working at an Orchis black site to track Nightcrawler through New York. Toomes sends Cloak and Dagger, Feral, Fatale, Animax, and Reaper to target Mystique and Nightcrawler.

== Other versions ==
=== Age of Apocalypse ===
An alternate universe incarnation of the Hounds from Earth-295 appears in Age of Apocalypse, consisting of Sabretooth, Caliban, and Wolverine.

=== Spider-Verse ===
An alternate universe incarnation of the Hounds from Earth-001 appears in the "Spider-Verse" and "Spider-Geddon" storylines, consisting of Sable, Fireheart, Kravinoff, Scorpion, Rhino, Hammerhead, Ox, Hobgoblin, Green Goblin, Vulture, and Chameleon.

== In other media ==
- The Hounds appear in the X-Men: The Animated Series episode "The Fifth Horseman", consisting of Caliban and three unnamed members.
- The Hounds appear in The Gifted, where they are led by Roderick Campbell.
