= Franklin Richards (character) =

Marvel Comics fictional character

- Franklin Richards. Art by Javier Garron.

Publication information
- Publisher: Marvel Comics
- First appearance: Fantastic Four Annual #6 (November 1968)
- Created by: Stan Lee; Jack Kirby

In-story information
- Alter ego: Franklin Benjamin Richards
- Species: Human mutant (originally); Depowered human mutate (retconned)
- Place of origin: New York City
- Team affiliations: Future Foundation; Fantastic Four; Fantastic Force; Power Pack; Generation X Daydreamers
- Notable aliases: Powerhouse; Psi-Lord; Ego-Spawn; Avatar; Tattletale; Franklin Benjamin; Richard Franklin
- Abilities: Reality warping; Matter and energy manipulation; Energy projection; Psionic abilities such as telekinesis, telepathy, astral projection, and precognition; Teleportation; Immortality; Pocket universe creation

Franklin Benjamin Richards is a fictional character appearing in American comic books published by Marvel Comics. The character is a supporting character in Fantastic Four. He has been portrayed as a child and as a novice superhero.

Franklin is an immensely powerful being with vast reality-manipulating and psionic powers beyond most Omega level mutants. He is the son of Mister Fantastic and the Invisible Woman of the Fantastic Four, the older brother of Valeria Richards, and the nephew of Invisible Woman's younger brother, the Human Torch. His parents named him Franklin Benjamin Richards; his middle name is taken from his godfather Ben Grimm, the Thing. Franklin's first name comes from Franklin Storm, his maternal grandfather. He has started using the code name Powerhouse. Franklin restricts the use of his powers to once a year in an attempt to give himself a normal, healthy childhood.

== Publication history ==
Franklin first appears in Fantastic Four Annual #6 (November 1968), and was created by Stan Lee and Jack Kirby, although he didn't receive his name until two years later in Fantastic Four #94 (January 1970). Lee recounted:

In trying to be realistic, as we always did ... Sue Storm and Reed Richards in The Fantastic Four had been married for quite a while, and I figured the most natural thing in the world would be for them to have a baby. Then it occurred to me we could have a lot of fun with that, because we would assume that if two people with super powers have a baby, the baby might have a super power. But what super power would he have? And we could keep the readers guessing for years until the baby grew up. ... Of course, Sue's pregnancy took about a year and a half or two years, because comic book time is somewhat different from real-world time. And we wanted to stretch that out as long as we could while we tried to figure out whether she'd have a boy or a girl and what to name it. We finally decided on a boy named Franklin Richards.

Appearing sporadically in the pages of Fantastic Four over the following fifteen years, Franklin became a member of the pre-teen superhero team Power Pack as of issue #17 (December 1985) of that title until its cancellation with issue #62 (February 1991). From November 1994 an older version of the same character (aged for the purposes of a story) appeared in the pages of Marvel's Fantastic Force until publication ceased as of April 1996. Between appearances in these other titles, Franklin has remained a recurring cast member of the Fantastic Four comic book. From July 2007 until the series' cancellation in February 2009, an alternate version of Franklin appeared as a cast member in the Marvel Adventures all-ages Power Pack series of titles.

== Fictional character biography ==
=== Origin ===
Franklin Richards was born in New York City to Reed and Susan Richards. He manifests his powers as a toddler, which draws the attention of Annihilus. Annihilus seeks to use Franklin as a source for his own resurgence, transferring some measure of the child's latent power to himself with a gene-based machine, and releasing Franklin's full potential in the process. Fearing the immediate threat of his son's powers to the entire populace of Earth and unable to find another solution in time, Reed Richards shuts down Franklin's mind.

During a battle between Ultron and the Fantastic Four, Ultron's energy output awakens Franklin's powers again, resulting in Ultron's defeat. Free of the energies expended in the confrontation with Ultron, Franklin is seemingly returned to his normal power level.

Needing someone to watch over Franklin in their absence, Reed and Susan Richards hire Agatha Harkness as a nanny. Franklin and Agatha soon developed a familial-like bond, even residing together for a time at Whisper Hill, Agatha's old residence. Eventually, Agatha returned to live in the secret witch community of New Salem, Colorado, and Franklin moved back in permanently with his parents and the rest of the Fantastic Four. His powers, no longer dormant, continue to manifest.

Under the care of yet another guardian, H.E.R.B.I.E., Franklin unintentionally used his powers to age himself into adulthood. As an adult, he is an adept at molecular manipulation and psionics. On realizing his mistake, he restored himself to childhood.

=== Attempt at a normal life ===
The first appearance of Franklin Richards as the superhero/Power Pack member Tattletale (Power Pack #17, December 1985), alongside the similarly-aged Katie Power, who suggests his codename. Art by June Brigman.

A promotional advertisement for the "Fall of the Mutants" storyline which ran in various Marvel Comics cover dated November 1987. Franklin Richards is pictured at the far right as Tattletale. Art by Jon Bogdanove.

To try to give his son a "normal" life, Reed Richards creates psychic inhibitors to prevent his powers from being used, but Franklin, whether by fault or by intent, could still at times bypass the inhibitors and use his powers, such as projecting an image of himself at a long distance. At this point he secretly joined a team of pre-teen superheroes called Power Pack, in which he was code-named "Tattletale". Katie Power of the group is sometimes resentful of the attention Franklin gets, and Power Pack writer Louise Simonson commented that they "kind of become friends, but there will always be a little bit of rivalry between the two of them."

Franklin lives with the Power family for a time when his parents decide that a superhero headquarters was a dangerous place for a child to live, and want Franklin to spend time in a "normal" family environment. He returns to his family when Power Pack temporarily left Earth for the Kymellian homeworld.

=== Psi-Lord ===
Franklin is later kidnapped by his time-traveling grandfather Nathaniel Richards and replaced with his teenage counterpart, Psi-Lord, who had been raised by Nathaniel in a dimension outside of time. Franklin, as Psi-Lord, founds the team Fantastic Force. By tapping a stud hidden within the glove of his costume, Franklin was able to summon battle armor from a pocket dimension; it was designed specifically to siphon off the full measure of his powers. As such, Franklin's abilities at this time were limited to telepathy, precognition, and psionic energy blasts.

Nathaniel eventually revealed that in another possible future timeline, Franklin Richards would, with Rachel Summers, father the villain Hyperstorm. In an effort to divert the attention of the Fantastic Four, Nathaniel traveled back to the precise point in time when Franklin was abducted by Nathaniel Richards and returned the child to his parents mere seconds after he was first kidnapped, thus rendering the Psi-Lord version of Franklin Richards obsolete in the Earth-616 timeline.

=== Onslaught ===
Shortly after these events, Onslaught kidnaps Franklin in order to use his abilities to reshape reality. To defeat Onslaught, the Fantastic Four, the Avengers, the X-Men, and several other heroes destroy first his physical form, and then his psychic form. In the process, Franklin's parents seemingly die. Franklin displays his true power, singlehandedly creating the "Heroes Reborn" pocket universe to contain the heroes who had "died" in that adventure. Some of them are recreated based on Franklin's memories of them, such as the temporally-displaced teenage Tony Stark becoming an adult once more while the mutated Wasp is restored to human form. While his parents are away in the Heroes Reborn universe, Generation X and Alicia Masters look after Franklin. This universe comes to be represented by a small, bluish ball which Franklin carries with him. He is ultimately convinced to allow the heroes to return and both universes to remain functioning.

In the wake of Mister Fantastic's activation of the Ultimate Nullifier to destroy Abraxas, Franklin loses all his powers in the process of reforming Galactus and thus becomes a normal child.

=== Future Foundation ===
On his birthday, Franklin's powers are reactivated by a strange intruder who is revealed to be a future version of Franklin himself. The future version of Franklin secretly tutors his younger self in the use of his powers. The future Franklin reiterates to his young counterpart that his powers must be properly harnessed for a singular intent: the act of life preservation.

In a confrontation between the Future Foundation and the Mad Celestials of Earth-4280, Franklin is described by one of the Celestials as 'beyond [the] Omega classification' applied to mutants, and is subsequently attacked with concussion beams. Franklin repels their attacks. It is revealed that Franklin is immortal and will survive billions of years in the future to witness the birth of a new universe alongside Galactus.

=== The Secret of Franklin Richards ===
During the Krakoa era, it is revealed that Franklin is not a mutant, and that he had subconsciously used his cosmic powers to alter the cells of his body so that he had previously appeared to be a mutant.

After resuming a normal, everyday life with his family, Franklin awakens one night to find his conscious control over his reality-altering powers restored. Having previously reasoned that if his abilities were left unchecked throughout his remaining adolescence, he would never be able to grow up normally or reach the emotional development needed to use them wisely as an adult, Franklin chose to keep his powers hidden from himself and others except for one day a year when he wakes up and remembers everything. On such days, Franklin uses his powers to explore the multiverse for any potential threats and only intervenes when absolutely necessary.

== Powers and abilities ==
Originally, Franklin possesses the power to warp reality, i.e., to make any thought or desire come to fruition, even up to a cosmic scale. He is able to rearrange the molecular structure of matter and energy at will. Once, Franklin subconsciously created his own pocket universe, encompassing a virtual replica of Earth-616. Franklin has been referred to as being equal in power to the Celestials and other cosmic entities.

In addition to reality and molecular manipulation, Franklin has vast psionic powers that have manifested as telepathy, telekinesis, energy blasts of concussive force, precognition, and astral projection. Being a child, Franklin's abilities are restricted to an extent by his limited control. Moreover, it remains unclear what power levels Franklin will ultimately achieve as an adult, as several future incarnations from alternate realities as well as the mainstream Marvel universe have been shown to vary in power. One such manifestation of Franklin in adult form was able to destroy two Celestials from Earth-4280 during physical combat; in the aftermath of their defeat, Franklin's immortality was strongly implied. The same individual also tapped into the power of his younger self to resurrect and transform Galactus into his own personal herald after the Devourer of Worlds had been rendered unconscious in battle against the Mad Celestials.

== Other versions ==
=== Days of Future Past ===
An alternate universe version of Franklin Richards appears in Days of Future Past. This version is known as Scrapper and is the lover of Rachel Summers until he is killed by Sentinels. In a variant of this timeline, Richards and Summers give birth to Hyperstorm (Jonathan Richards), a mutant capable of drawing virtually limitless energy from Hyperspace.

=== Fantastic Four: Annual 1998 ===
A possible future version of Franklin Richards appears in Fantastic Four Annual (1998). This version is married to a Wakandan woman named Zawadi and has a daughter named N'Yami. Franklin is also a member of the Fantastic Four, codenamed Zero Man, and has the ability to access the Negative Zone.

=== Earth X ===
In Earth X, Franklin Richards curses Namor for killing the Human Torch. Half of Namor's body is now constantly burning, even underwater. Franklin later takes Galactus' armor and becomes Galactus before leaving Earth.

=== Franklin Richards: Son of a Genius ===
Art by Chris Eliopoulos

In the out-of-continuity humor series Franklin Richards: Son of a Genius, Franklin is portrayed as a Calvin-esque troublemaker who cannot resist "playing" with his father's inventions, with disastrous results. The first twelve Son of a Genius one-shots were drawn by Chris Eliopoulos and co-written by Eliopoulos and Marc Sumerak. Since then, Eliopoulos wrote the series solo.

=== MC2 ===
In the MC2 universe, Franklin is in the Fantastic Five under the name of Psi-Lord, his powers reduced to telekinesis after a battle with Hyperstorm. Franklin deliberately amplifies his powers to battle Doctor Doom, leaving him with a fiery skull-like face and forcing him to wear a containment helmet at all times.

=== Power Pack – All Ages Version ===
In the Fantastic Four and Power Pack miniseries, an alternate timeline Franklin Richards is promoted a few grades and enrolled in the same class as Jack Power. Because of persecution as a result of him having the Richards name, Reed later decides that he should be kept in the Baxter Building for home schooling, possibly as long as college. Franklin then runs away with Jack, then proceeds to get captured by Doctor Doom. Doom switches bodies with Franklin for a short time to pursue the destruction of the Fantastic Four, leaving Franklin trapped in Doom's comatose body. When Jack Power undoes the body swap, Franklin leads the Power Pack in sending Doom to the Negative Zone.

=== Forever Yesterday ===
In an alternate reality detailed in New Warriors #11–13, the Richards family is part of a resistance movement against Sphinx. They join with the family of Dwayne Taylor. Despite their age differences, Franklin and Dwayne are shown as friends. An attack by agents of the Sphinx leaves all but Dwayne murdered.

=== Other future incarnations ===
Future incarnations of Franklin as appearing in Power Pack #36

In Power Pack #36 (published in April 1987), Franklin and his friends battled the giant robot Master Mold. The Master Mold's primary objective was to eliminate the Twelve, the future leaders of mutant-kind. Describing Franklin as a mutant entity of the "ultimate" potential, and the only mutant ever to develop such power, the machine visualizes possible future incarnations of Franklin prior to seeking him out for annihilation. One image depicts Franklin as a young adult known as Ultiman. Another image shows a striking figure somewhat older in appearance than Ultiman (closely resembling the Silver Surfer) with marks upon his face similar to the "hound scars" commonly associated with Rachel Summers of Earth-811. As per Master Mold, this adult incarnation of Franklin is simply called "The Twelfth".

=== Ultimate Marvel ===
In Ultimate X-Men/Fantastic Four Annual #1, a young Franklin Richards is part of a future team of X-Men. It is revealed that in all of the possible futures, Franklin is Reed (as Nihil) and Sue's son. He is also revealed to be the host to that timeline's Phoenix Force.

== In other media ==
- Franklin Richards makes a non-speaking appearance in The Super Hero Squad Show episode "Support Your Local Sky-Father!".
- Franklin Richards appears in The Fantastic Four: First Steps, portrayed by Ada Scott.

== Awards ==
Awards include:

- 2008: Chris Eliopoulos was nominated for the "Special Award for Humor" Harvey Award for his work on Franklin Richards.

== Collected editions ==
Title	Material collected	Published date	ISBN
Franklin Richards: Son of a Genius Ultimate Collection Vol. 1	Son of A Genius, Everybody Loves Franklin, Super Summer Spectacular, Happy Franksgiving, March Madness, World Be Warned, Monster Mash, Fall	October 13, 2010	978-0785149248
Franklin Richards: Son of a Genius Ultimate Collection Vol. 2	Spring Break, Not-So-Secret Invasion, Summer Smackdown, Sons Of Geniuses, It's Dark Reigning Cats & Dogs, April Fools!, School's Out	December 8, 2010	978-0785149255
