= Arclight (Marvel Comics) =

Mutant super-villain character from Marvel Comics

Philippa Sontag Arclight
- Arclight. Main image by Steve Skroce. Background art by Joe Madureira.

Publication information
- Publisher: Marvel Comics
- First appearance: In shadow: Uncanny X-Men #210 (Oct. 1986); Full appearance: Uncanny X-Men #211 (Nov. 1986)
- Created by: Chris Claremont (writer); John Romita Jr. (artist)

In-story information
- Alter ego: Philippa Sontag
- Species: Human mutant
- Team affiliations: Marauders; Femizons
- Abilities: Superhuman strength and durability Able to generate shock waves and seismic tremors U.S. Army training

Arclight (Philippa Sontag) is a supervillain appearing in American comic books published by Marvel Comics. Created by writer Chris Claremont and artist John Romita Jr., the character first appeared in Uncanny X-Men #210 as a shadow, making a full appearance in Uncanny X-Men #211 (November 1986). Arclight is a former military officer who later becomes an assassin, with the mutant ability to create powerful shockwaves from her hands.

Arclight is primarily a member of the Marauders, a group of mutants who often work for the mad scientist villain Mister Sinister. As a Marauder, she has often fought the X-Men as well as related teams and heroes like X-Factor and X-Force. Like many of the Marauders, Arclight has been killed in battle more than once, only to be revived each time by Sinister through advanced human cloning techniques.

The character has made minor appearances throughout other forms of media, such as animated television series and the film X-Men: The Last Stand, portrayed by Omahyra Mota, and the video game Deadpool, voiced by Chani Krich.

== Publication history ==
Arclight and the Marauders were introduced in the storyline "Mutant Massacre", and created by writer Chris Claremont and artist John Romita Jr. Arclight first appeared in silhouette in Uncanny X-Men #210 (Oct. 1986), then made her first full appearance in the following issue, issue #211 (Nov. 1986). In reference to this crossover, X-Factor writer/artist Walt Simonson said that "when Jon Bogdanove drew Arclight in Power Pack, she had a much different figure than I gave her in X-Factor. But I went back and did a little bit of revision work in my book after I'd seen what John had done".

Originally, Arclight was implied to be a veteran of the Vietnam War. Eventually, this proved problematic since modern Marvel Comics stories exist in a sliding timeline where new comics take place around the date of publication. As a result, Arclight and other characters tied to real history would have become implausibly old over time. To address this, the 2019 miniseries History of the Marvel Universe revised canon, revealing that a war was fought for decades in the fictional Asian country Siancong, ending only a few years before the rise of the modern superhero era. As a result, a number of characters were retroactively established to have served in the Siancong War, with Arclight presumably among them.

== Fictional character biography ==
As part of the United States military, Philippa Sontag served with ground forces in southeast Asia, apparently as part of the Vietnam War. Sontag's traumatic experiences during the war haunt her for years afterward. She projects her trauma and rage into bodybuilding and mercenary work, becoming a violent assassin. Already a mutant born with enhanced strength and stamina, Sontag's training makes her proportionately stronger and more formidable. Sontag also trains in how to best use her mutant shock wave power in combat, combining it with her super strength in the form of punches and blows.

Several years later, Mister Sinister decides to wipe out a community of sewer-dwelling mutants called Morlocks. Obsessed with improving mutations in mutants and creating a perfect race of superhumans, Sinister believes the Morlocks (many of whom are physically deformed or disabled by their mutant abilities) will pollute the gene pool. He also learns that many Morlocks were further mutated by scientific methods based on his own research (performed by Dark Beast), and is offended that his "signature" was used without permission. Sinister has Gambit assemble the Marauders to exterminate the Morlocks, with John Greycrow as field leader and Sontag as second-in-command.

The terrorist Superia plots to conquer the world, hoping to dominate men and sterilize all other women. To help her overthrow society, she recruits an army of women warriors, including Arclight. After learning that there exists a possible future where Earth is ruled by women overlords called Femizons, Superia names her own present-day army the Femizons. Her efforts are thwarted by a collection of fighters led by Captain America. Although Superia later creates a new, smaller group of Femizons, Arclight does not join them. Instead, she returns to the Marauders.

Following M-Day, most of Earth's mutants lose their X-gene and corresponding abilities. It is determined that about 198 mutants retain the X-gene, with Arclight being one of them. For a time, she takes refuge at the X-Mansion. Later on, Arclight leaves, eventually joining the New Marauders. This team fights the X-Men and other heroes in the storyline "X-Men: Messiah Complex", where they attempt to gain possession of the "Mutant Messiah" - the first mutant born after M-Day.

In the 2019 event Dawn of X, a new mutant community is formed under the direction of former enemies Charles Xavier and Magneto. The new community takes up residence on the living island Krakoa, providing sanctuary and amnesty for mutants. Greycrow joins the community and Mister Sinister is invited to serve in its governing body, the Quiet Council of Krakoa. Arclight and the Marauders (with the exception of Sabretooth) reject amnesty and take refuge in the Essex State Home for Foundlings, an orphanage formerly owned by Sinister.

== Powers and abilities ==
Arclight is a mutant with the ability to generate seismic force from her hands, causing short-range shock waves and tremors in the immediate area. In some comics, a flash of light accompanies her powers. She has developed a fighting style where she releases a shockwave while throwing her fist, creating a shattering punch effect. Her mutant X-gene grants her superhuman strength, stamina, and resistance to injury. Her extensive strength training has made her even stronger and more formidable. Arclight has military training in jungle survival, hand-to-hand combat, and various firearms and explosives.

== In other media ==
=== Television ===
- Arclight makes minor cameo appearances in X-Men: The Animated Series.
- A male incarnation of Arclight appears in Wolverine and the X-Men, voiced by André Sogliuzzo. This version is the field leader of Mister Sinister's Marauders.

=== Film ===
Arclight appears in X-Men: The Last Stand, portrayed by Omahyra Mota. This version is a member of the Omegas, who join forces with Magneto's Brotherhood to oppose the creation of a mutant cure, only to be killed by the Phoenix.

=== Video games ===
Arclight appears as a boss in Deadpool, voiced by Chani Krich. This version is a member of Mister Sinister's Marauders, who encounter the eponymous character after they unknowingly cost him a bounty. While seeking revenge on them, Deadpool kills Arclight in battle and later faces several clones of her.
