= Harpoon (comics) =

Publication information
- Publisher: Marvel Comics
- First appearance: Uncanny X-Men #210 (October 1986)
- Created by: Chris Claremont; John Romita Jr. Dan Green

In-story information
- Alter ego: Kodiak Noatak
- Species: Human mutant
- Team affiliations: Marauders
- Abilities: Ability to charge metal with bio-energy

Harpoon (Kodiak Noatak) is a fictional character appearing in American comic books published by Marvel Comics. He is a member of the mutant assassin team known as Marauders, who are employed by Mister Sinister. Little is known about Harpoon other than that he is Inuit.

== Publication history ==
Harpoon first appeared in Uncanny X-Men #210 (October 1986), and was created by Chris Claremont, John Romita Jr. and Dan Green. (Note: In Uncanny X-Men #210, Harpoon appears as a silhouette.)

The character subsequently appears in Thor #373-374 (November–December 1986), X-Factor #10 (November 1986), Power Pack #27 (December 1986), Uncanny X-Men #213 (January 1987), 221-222 (September–October 1987), 240-241 (January–February 1989), X-Factor #38 (March 1989), Wolverine (vol. 2) #10 (August 1989), X-Man #18 (August 1996), Cable & Machine Man Annual 1999, Gambit #9 (October 1999), Weapon X #26 (September 2004), X-Men and Power Pack #4 (March 2006), New Avengers #18 (June 2006), X-Men (vol. 2) #200-201 (August–September 2007), New X-Men #44-46 (January–March 2008), X-Factor #27 (March 2008), X-Men (vol. 2) #207 (March 2008), and Uncanny X-Men (vol. 5) #18 (July 2019).

Harpoon received an entry in the Official Handbook of the Marvel Universe Update '89 #3.

== Fictional character biography ==
Harpoon is a founding member of the Marauders, which were assembled by Gambit. (Note: In X-Men Origins: Gambit, it is shown on panel Gambit recruiting the original members (save Harpoon), then a double page spread where he is present.) The team ambush a Morlock girl named Tommy and a human Hellfire Club soldier named Richard in Los Angeles. The Marauders kill Richard and let Tommy escape to the Morlocks' Alley. (Note: Although it was initially established that the Marauders followed Tommy to the Alley, later retcons show that Gambit led them into the tunnels.)

In the first encounter with the X-Men during the Morlock Massacre, Harpoon hurls a harpoon at Rogue while she is vulnerable after having her powers neutralized by the Marauder Scrambler. Kitty Pryde phases Rogue, hoping Harpoon's weapon will pass harmlessly through her, but the spear is in an energy state and strikes them anyway, trapping Kitty in her intangible state.

Harpoon crosses paths with Cyclops, Beast, and Iceman and tries to kill the Morlock Plague with Sabretooth, but they are stopped by Apocalypse, who recruits Plague into his Horsemen. He and Blockbuster later attack the X-Man Angel, badly damaging his wings. Angel is saved by Thor, who drives the Marauders off.

Harpoon lost his powers after the events of "Decimation". After M-Day, Harpoon resurfaces with the rest of the Marauders, still working for Mister Sinister. To make up for his lack of powers, he carries a weaponized harpoon.

== Powers and abilities ==
Harpoon is a mutant with the ability to charge metal with his bio-energy for various effects, such as shocking or stunning his opponents. He is skilled in using his spears as weapons, both in melee combat and as thrown projectiles. After losing his powers, Harpoon continues to use spears, which are upgraded to compensate for his loss.

== In other media ==
- Harpoon appears in the Wolverine and the X-Men episode "eXcessive Force", voiced by Fred Tatasciore.
- Harpoon appears in the X-Men '97 tie-in comic.
