= Third Summers brother =

X-Men storyline

The third Summers brother is a plot point in X-Men comic books regarding the family of the superhero Cyclops, alias Scott Summers. The plot point was first referenced by writer Fabian Nicieza in X-Men vol. 2 #23 (1993), published by Marvel Comics. In that issue the villain Mister Sinister has a conversation with X-Men member Cyclops and casually mentions Cyclops' "brothers." Cyclops notes that it is odd to talk about his brothers in the plural, since as far as he knows he has just one brother (Alex Summers, also known as Havok). However, the dialogue does not mention three, implying there could be several brothers still in existence.

While Sinister himself immediately claimed that it was just a common mistake of his, the speculation about the mysterious third Summers brother ran rampant among fandom for many years. The question "Is there a third Summers brother?" lingered for years and is one of the most important questions of the main Marvel continuity, along with "Who is Nightcrawler's mother?" and "What is Wolverine's origin?".

Gambit (due to his energy abilities) and Adam X were both believed to be one of the missing brothers at some point. Marvel revealed a third Summers brother, known as Vulcan, in the 2006 miniseries X-Men: Deadly Genesis. A series released in 2021 returns to this story and reveals Adam X as another Summers brother.

== Adam X ==
Beginning with X-Men #39, Adam X the X-Treme was intended to be the additional brother to Cyclops once mentioned cryptically by Mister Sinister. Sinister mentioned that he did not want Cyclops or "[his] brothers" to succumb to the Legacy Virus, but the plans for this were dropped when Fabian Nicieza left Marvel's various X-Titles in 1995. He was supposed to be the son of D'Ken and Katherine Anne Summers, the mother of Cyclops, Havok, and (as subsequently revealed) Vulcan, who had been captured by the Shi'ar. While this origin was never confirmed in the comics themselves, Adam is half-human, and Katherine was the only known human woman in Shi'ar space at the time. X-Men #39 (December 1994) featured a story about Adam discovering Philip Summers (father of Christopher Summers and grandfather of Cyclops and Havok) in the Alaskan wilderness and feeling an unusual connection to the old man.

Nicieza left the X-Men office in 1995, and many of his plots were taken in new directions. With the emergence of the comic series X-Treme X-Men in 2001, the reappearance of the character X-Treme was made even more unlikely, due to the likelihood of confusion.

In the third issue of that 1995 series, Nicieza revealed the secret origin of Adam X (that he was the illegitimate offspring of D'Ken and Kate Summers) but this plot point has never been mentioned since.

While it was always intended that Adam X is in fact the "third Summers brother", the idea has been retconned in favor of a new character introduced by Ed Brubaker in the mini-series X-Men: Deadly Genesis, Vulcan. Yet, like Adam X, Vulcan does have a mysterious connection to the Shi'ar.

Alternatively, it can be argued that the current version of the story (in Deadly Genesis) would negate the scenario of Adam X being the son of D'Ken and Katherine Summers, as she was already pregnant with Vulcan when they met, and died at the hands of D'Ken when he ripped Vulcan from her womb before Adam X's supposed birth to Katherine. However, this can just as easily be counter-argued by the possibility that Adam X is a test tube baby, like his possible nephews X-Man and Stryfe, and in-vitro fertilization and ectogenesis have been shown to indeed be a common practice for the Shi'ar, who, even if they have the ability to give birth to live young, also incubate their own eggs in public hatcheries (which were shown to be a prime target of the Phalanx, when they once invaded the Empire).

== Apocalypse ==
During his run on Cable, author Robert Weinberg planned for Apocalypse to have been the third Summers brother all along, but Weinberg left the book before he could go along with his plan. Rather than an entirely different origin, Weinberg's idea functions as a prelude to the Rise of Apocalypse story. Following the concept of predestination paradox, Christopher Summers, married with Katherine Anne, had a love affair with a nameless woman, possibly a mutant, and left her before she discovered that she was pregnant. For reasons unknown, she never informed Summers that she was going to have his son. Shortly after the woman gives birth to a powerful mutant, the boy is taken from her, stolen by a mysterious time-traveling figure from the future, who goes back into the past and abandons the child, who knew neither his father nor mother, on the desert of Egypt. He was called "The First One" (because the baby was the first Summers child), or as he became known in the language of those who found and raised him, En Sabah Nur, the mutant to be known as Apocalypse. Moreover, while posing as a god during his lifetime, Apocalypse had fathered children, who, in turn had children, until one of his descendants could have been in London at the time of The Further Adventures of Cyclops and Phoenix. As such, it would be possible that the X-gene that developed in the Summers family also came from Apocalypse (making him Cable's uncle).

Weinberg disliked Apocalypse as being the first mutant, stating:

Surely no one reading Marvel Comics ever believed that Apocalypse was the first mutant? He may have been one of the first powerful mutants, but the first one? Never. Evolution is based on the theory of survival of the fittest. Modern man is the result of thousands of mutations over a hundred thousand years. Claiming someone in early Egyptian times was the first mutant is not only bad science, it's just ridiculous.

== Gambit ==
Several hints were made to Gambit being a third-Summers brother shortly after his introduction into the comics. His most notable similarities were to Cyclops, as both of them shared dark brown hair and red eyes. Gambit's origins prior to being adopted by the Thieves Guild were unknown, causing much speculation as to him possibly being the third Summers brother. The series X-Men: The End, which presented one possible future of the X-Men, established that Gambit was a genetically engineered mutant created by Mister Sinister with his DNA spliced partially from Cyclops and Sinister himself, thus making him a third brother in some respects and explaining how Sinister was already aware of there being another Summers child.

During an interview with Comic Book Resources, at the question "what's your opinion of the revelation of Gambit being the character in question over in X-Men: The End?", Fabian Nicieza answers that "My opinion is that I screwed up plenty of Chris's stories; he's more than welcome to screw up one of mine."

== Vulcan ==
The 2006 series X-Men: Deadly Genesis established that a third Summers brother did indeed exist and was the previously unknown character Vulcan. The series sales was not good at the beginning. During an interview with IGN, the editor Nick Lowe declares that the information about the presence of the third Summers brother in the story was revealed to increase the sales.

It is not yet known whether Mister Sinister was even aware of Vulcan's existence, particularly since at the time he spoke to Cyclops about having more than one brother, Vulcan was believed to have been dead for several years with no evidence to the contrary. As such, the link between Vulcan and Mister Sinister's statement is still speculative. It is also pointed out by fans that Mister Sinister's comment meant there was at least a third brother, he did not specify a number and therefore other brothers might also exist. In any case, the current version of the story could negate the scenario of Adam X being the son of D'Ken and Katherine Summers, as she was already pregnant when they met, and died before Adam X was born, though this could be excused by the possibility that Adam X is a test tube baby, and it has been shown that in-vitro fertilization and ectogenesis are common Shi'ar practices.
