= The Adventures of Cyclops and Phoenix =

Comic book mini-series

- Cover of the 1st issue

Publication information
- Publisher: Marvel Comics
- Schedule: Monthly
- Format: Mini-series
- Genre: Superhero
- Publication date: May – August 1994
- No. of issues: 4
- Main character(s): Cyclops; Jean Grey

Creative team
- Written by: Scott Lobdell
- Penciller: Gene Ha
- Inker(s): Al Vey; Terry Austin; Josef Rubinstein; Mark Pennington; Bill Anderson; Al Milgrom
- Letterer: Richard Starkings
- Colorist: Kevin Somers
- Editor: Bob Harras

Collected editions
- The Adventures of Cyclops and Phoenix: ISBN 0-7851-0171-3

The Adventures of Cyclops and Phoenix is a four-issue comic book mini-series written by Scott Lobdell, drawn by Gene Ha, and published by American company Marvel Comics in 1994. It revealed much of the back story for the character Cable, much of which had been implied before, but was still shrouded in mystery and uncertainty. The series' title characters are two of the founding members of the X-Men, a group of superpowered mutants dedicated to confronting the bigotry that afflicts their people, and stopping mutants with evil motives. They have regular adventures which fall into almost every subgenre of science fiction imaginable, including frequent encounters with time travel.

== Backstory ==
Shortly after Jean Grey (Phoenix) was believed dead, Cyclops (her longtime love interest, real name Scott Summers) met a woman who was almost her exact duplicate named Madelyne Pryor. Unbeknownst to either of them at the time, Pryor was a clone of Jean Grey, created by Mister Sinister. Sinister was given vast powers by the virtually immortal mutant Apocalypse, but he feared Apocalypse's power and began to investigate a means to defeat him. He discovered that the combination of Summers and Grey's DNA would produce a mutant of sufficient power to do this. With Jean Grey apparently dead, and Sinister for some reason unable to combine their DNA artificially, he created Pryor and positioned her to make contact with Cyclops. His plan worked: the two married and had a child, whom they named Nathan Summers.

Some time later, Jean Grey was revealed to be alive, and her reappearance led to a series of events that caused Madelyne Pryor to become insane and eventually kill herself (as told in the Inferno crossover). The baby was left in the care of Cyclops and Jean, who were now part of the group X-Factor.

Shortly after, X-Factor had an encounter with Apocalypse in X-Factor #68, and the villain infected the young baby with a techno-organic virus. The virus was rapidly converting his body into a machine, and had already consumed one of his arms. Unsure of what to do, at that moment a mysterious woman calling herself Askani appeared in front of them. She revealed that she was from the distant future, and had the means to save the child, but it would mean that they would likely never see him again. In reality, the child grew up to be the mutant Cable, who had journeyed back into the past and who had appeared a few months before this event in New Mutants #87.

== Plot summary ==
The series takes place shortly after the wedding of Cyclops and Jean Grey in X-Men #30, some time after the events of X-Factor #68 (approximately three years in real time, but perhaps only a year or less in the timeline of the comic books).

Rachel Summers, the daughter of alternate universe versions of Cyclops and Jean, who serves as the Mother Askani, brings the two into her future, a bleak world ruled by Apocalypse. There, they inhabit separate bodies from their own and are reunited with Scott's son Nathan. Prior to their arrival, Mother Askani and the Askani clan attempted to save Nathan from the techno-organic virus he had been infected with, which was gradually making his body mechanical. They first cloned Nathan, fearing that they would fail in their efforts to save him. Nathan survived the virus, while his clone was kidnapped by Apocalypse's forces and was named Stryfe. Apocalypse thought the baby was the original, and had somehow survived the virus. Seeing this as a sign of strength, Apocalypse plans to transfer his essence into Stryfe.

Nathan is trained in the use of his burgeoning telepathic powers, particularly how to use his telekinesis to keep the virus at bay. Their identity as his true parents was kept a secret, and they instead went by the names Slym and Redd. All together, Cyclops and Jean spend 12 years raising Nathan, who never learns that they are his parents. When Mother Askani dies, their minds are brought back to their original bodies.

== Sequels ==
The Adventures of Cyclops and Phoenix was followed up by two other mini-series, Askani'son and The Further Adventures of Cyclops and Phoenix. Askani'son chronicled Cable's teenage years after Redd and Slym left, and his further struggles to become a man. The Further Adventures of Cyclops and Phoenix sees the two once again misplaced in time, this time back to the turn of the century, to be witness to the origin of Mister Sinister.

== In other media ==
Elements from The Adventures of Cyclops and Phoenix are adapted into the X-Men '97 episode "Days of Past Future".

== Collected editions ==
A trade paperback was produced some time after the mini-series finished publication collecting it into one volume (ISBN 0-7851-0171-3). However, it was produced during a period of economic decline for Marvel, and before trades had reached the popularity they would a few years later, and has thus been left out of print.

In 2014, the miniseries was collected along with two other miniseries that continue the young Cable side of the story Askani'son and X-Men: Phoenix.

In 2018, the miniseries was collected into a single paperback along with The Further Adventures of Cyclops and Phoenix.

=== Cyclops & Phoenix series ===
Title	Material collected	Publication date	ISBN
X-Men: The Adventures of Cyclops and Phoenix	The Adventures of Cyclops and Phoenix #1-4, Askani'son (1996) #1-4, Phoenix #1-3, X-Men Books of Askani, material from the Marvel Valentine's Day Special #1	2014	Paperback: 978-0785188339
X-Men: Cyclops & Phoenix - Past & Future	The Adventures of Cyclops and Phoenix #1-4, The Further Adventures of Cyclops and Phoenix #1-4, material from Marvel Valentine Special #1	2018	Paperback: 978-1302913793
