= Birdy (character) =

Publication information
- Publisher: Marvel Comics
- First appearance: X-Men (vol. 2) #6 (January 1992)

In-story information
- Alter ego: Unrevealed
- Species: Human mutant
- Team affiliations: Marauders; Legionaries
- Partnerships: Sabretooth
- Abilities: Telepathy

Birdy is a character appearing in American comic books published by Marvel Comics. She was created by Jim Lee and Scott Lobdell and made her first appearance in X-Men vol. 2 #6.

== Fictional character biography ==
Birdy is the partner of Sabretooth, using her telepathy to help keep Sabretooth calm. She accompanies Sabretooth while Sabretooth searches for answers on who is trying to kill him and Mystique. Birdy is later killed by Graydon Creed, Sabretooth's son.

Birdy is resurrected on Krakoa, becoming a counsellor for civilians and the Marauders team. She has also been a member of the Legionaries, a peacekeeping group established by Nightcrawler.

== Powers and abilities ==
Birdy is a mutant with the power of telepathy. She has achieved some level of skill, being capable of the standard feats of a mutant telepath (mind reading and manipulation, mental communication, psi-blasts, etc.). She is also able to use her telepathy to temporarily satiate Sabretooth's psychotic feral impulses (which he refers to as getting "the glow"). As a therapist, Birdy applies her powers to counsel patients inside their dreams.

== In other media ==
Birdy appears as an assist character for Sabretooth in the Marvel vs. Capcom series.
