= Riptide (Marvel Comics) =

Supervillain appearing in Marvel Comics

Janos Quested Riptide
- Riptide

Publication information
- Publisher: Marvel Comics
- First appearance: Uncanny X-Men #210 (October 1986)
- Created by: Chris Claremont; John Romita Jr.

In-story information
- Alter ego: Janos Quested
- Species: Human mutant
- Team affiliations: Marauders
- Abilities: Spins his body at greatly increased speeds, creating a vacuum suction that draws in nearby objects and also acts as a high-powered sling for objects which he generates out of calcified substances

Riptide (Janos Quested) is a mutant supervillain appearing in American comic books published by Marvel Comics, usually those related to the X-Men franchise.

He was portrayed by Álex González in the film X-Men: First Class.

== Publication history ==
Riptide first appeared in Uncanny X-Men #210 (as shadow only) in October 1986. He made his first full appearance in Uncanny X-Men #211 in November 1986. The character was created by Chris Claremont and John Romita Jr.

The character subsequently appears in Uncanny X-Men #240-241 (January–February 1989), #243 (April 1989), X-Man #13 (March 1996), Gambit #9 (October 1999), X-Men and Power Pack #4 (March 2006), X-Men #200-203 (August–November 2007), New X-Men #44-45 (January 2008), X-Men #205-206 (January–February 2008), New X-Men #46 (March 2008), and X-Factor #27 (March 2008).

Riptide appeared as part of the "Marauders" entry in the Official Handbook of the Marvel Universe Deluxe Edition #18.

== Fictional character biography ==
Riptide is a member of the Marauders, a team of villains brought together by the mutant thief Gambit at the request of Mister Sinister.

During the "Mutant Massacre" storyline, Sinister sends the Marauders to kill the Morlocks, a group of mutant outcasts who live underground. In an ensuing battle with the X-Men, Riptide severely injures Nightcrawler, Colossus, and Shadowcat. An enraged Colossus attacks Riptide, who manages to penetrate his skin with his blades. Undeterred, Colossus kills Riptide by snapping his neck. However, Riptide returns in a clone body created by Mister Sinister.

=== After M-Day ===
Riptide is among the 198 mutants who retain their powers after the events of M-Day, in which a mentally ill Scarlet Witch removes the mutant gene from the majority of the world's mutant population.

During the storyline "Messiah Complex", Riptide is part of the final battle on Muir Island. He battles Wolfsbane, knocking her out and giving her superficial wounds before he is rendered unconscious by Professor X.

Riptide and the Marauders are killed by Magneto, who seeks revenge for their actions against mutants. When more clones of the Marauders appear, Magneto brainwashes them into serving him.

=== Krakoan Age ===
During the Krakoan Age, Riptide and the Marauders are enslaved by Madelyne Pryor, who intends to use them to invade Krakoa. Greycrow and the Hellions attack and kill the Marauders, enabling them to be resurrected free of Pryor's control.

== Powers and abilities ==
Riptide is a mutant with the ability to spin his body at an incredibly fast rate. He can generate calcium growth from his bones that protrude through his skin, often taking the form of shurikens and spikes. When he spins, Riptide can release these growths at will, as sharp projectiles.

== In other media ==
- Riptide makes a non-speaking cameo appearance in a flashback in the Marvel Anime: X-Men episode "Armor - Awakening". This version is a young boy from South America who was trained by Emma Frost.
- Riptide appears in X-Men: First Class, portrayed by Álex González. This version is a member of the Hellfire Club. He assists the group in their plot to instigate the Cuban Missile Crisis and World War III until they are foiled by Charles Xavier and Erik Lehnsherr's fledgling X-Men and defects to Lehnsherr.
