= Graydon Creed =

Publication information
- Publisher: Marvel Comics
- First appearance: The Uncanny X-Men #299 (April 1993)
- Created by: Scott Lobdell; Brandon Peterson

In-story information
- Species: Human cyborg
- Team affiliations: Friends of Humanity; Upstarts
- Notable aliases: Tribune
- Abilities: Military training Hand-to-hand combat Technopathy

Graydon Creed is a fictional character appearing in American comic books published by Marvel Comics. The character was created by writer Scott Lobdell and artist Brandon Peterson and first appeared in The Uncanny X-Men #299 (April 1993). He is the "baseline human" son of Sabretooth and Mystique, as well as the half-brother of Nightcrawler and Rogue.

== Fictional character biography ==
Mystique (posing as German spy Leni Zauber) seduced freelance assassin Victor Creed (Sabretooth) while he was in Germany. Mystique later gave birth to a normal human child named Graydon whom she gave up for adoption, although she kept an eye on him. Graydon learns that he was the son of two mutants who had abandoned him as an inconvenience, growing resentful of all mutants.

As an adult, Graydon forms the Friends of Humanity, a terrorist group dedicated to opposing mutant civil rights by committing acts of terrorism against peaceful mutants and mutant sympathizers.

=== Upstarts ===
Graydon Creed also joins the Upstarts, a group of wealthy and powerful individuals assembled by Selene and the Gamesmaster with the sole purpose of killing mutants for points in a twisted game. After learning of his parents' identities, Creed seeks to kill them as part of the Upstarts' game. Disguised as the armored Tribune, Creed hires assassins to kill his mother and has his father implanted with a bomb. His father manages to remove the device and confronts his son. Creed callously stabs Birdy, a telepathic mutant who Sabretooth had employed to keep his homicidal rages in check.

During the Upstarts' self-professed "Younghunt", Creed is blackmailed into revealing the location of the Upstarts' prisoners by the New Warriors, who threaten to expose Creed as a mutant collaborator and the son of mutants.

=== Death ===
Graydon Creed runs for President on an anti-mutant platform with the support of Operation: Zero Tolerance. When a reporter from the Daily Bugle investigates Creed and discovers his parentage, Bastion kills the journalist to prevent the news from leaking out. Unbeknownst to Creed, the X-Men have infiltrated his presidential campaign, having Bobby Drake and Sam Guthrie operate undercover as his assistants.

On the eve of the election, Creed is assassinated during a campaign speech. The miniseries X-Men Forever reveals that a future version of Mystique had fired the shot, having sworn to kill Graydon for his part in the Friends of Humanity's attack on Trevor Chase, the grandson of Destiny.

=== Resurrection ===
In X-Force, the Purifiers recover Graydon Creed's corpse, which is resurrected by Bastion using the techno-organic virus taken from an "offspring" of Magus. Creed makes his resurrection public, claiming that he had faked his death.

Creed goes on to join the anti-mutant organization Orchis and begins traveling the multiverse, intending to kill every alternate universe version of Sabretooth. Creed and Sabretooth battle Wolverine and both are killed during this conflict, with Creed being killed by his father.

== Powers and abilities ==
Graydon Creed has basic military training and is an expert at hand-to-hand combat. While he was trapped in an alternate reality, Creed grafted a cybernetic suit to his body that turned him into a cyborg with technopathic abilities.

== Other versions ==
=== Age of Apocalypse ===
An alternate universe version of Graydon Creed appears in Age of Apocalypse. This version is a member of a human resistance against Apocalypse. In the "X-Termination" storyline, Creed is killed by the Exterminators.

=== Age of X ===
An alternate universe version of Graydon Creed appears in Age of X. This version is the leader of a strike force that drove mutants to the verge of extinction.

=== House of M ===
An alternate universe version of Graydon Creed appears in House of M. This version is a friend of Vice President Bolivar Trask who is later killed by Sabretooth.

=== Mutant X ===
An alternate universe version of Graydon Creed appears in Mutant X. This version is the President of the United States after Reed Richards's disappearance.

== In other media ==
- Graydon Creed Jr. appears in X-Men: The Animated Series, voiced by John Stocker.
  - Creed appears in X-Men '97, voiced by Ben Pronsky. By the end of the second season, Creed is elected President of the United States.
