= Marauders (comics) =

Group of fictional characters

- The Marauders featured on the cover of The Uncanny X-Men #240 (Jan. 1989). Art by Marc Silvestri.

Publication information
- Publisher: Marvel Comics
- First appearance: The Uncanny X-Men #210 (Oct. 1986)
- Created by: Chris Claremont; John Romita Jr. Dan Green

In-story information
- Base(s): Various
- Member(s): Current members: Arclight; Blockbuster; Harpoon; Malice; Prism; Riptide; Scalphunter; Scrambler; Vertigo; Former members: Aries; Azimuth; Chimera; Coda; Gambit; Lady Mastermind; Mystique; Omega Red; Omega Sentinel; Polaris; Sabretooth; Sunfire; Vanisher

The Marauders is a team of fictional characters appearing in American comic books published by Marvel Comics. The original Marauders team included mutant warriors and assassins employed by the X-Men's enemy Mister Sinister, a mad scientist villain often intent on creating a perfect race of superhumans. The Marauders have been tasked by Sinister to perform kidnappings, assassinations, mass murder, or simply fight Sinister's enemies. The Marauders have been killed in combat, but often Sinister uses his cloning technology to re-create them. This team of Marauders has appeared in many different stories of the X-Men franchise, as well as stories featuring other Marvel Comics heroes.

In 2019, the Dawn of X event involved the X-Men and many allies and enemies creating a new all-mutant country on the living island Krakoa. Teleport gates that only work for mutants were then created at various points on Earth, allowing any mutant who wished to join the new community to instantly do so. Kitty Pryde then formed a new team of "Marauders" to transport mutants to Krakoa who lived in countries that did not recognize the sovereignty of the mutant nation and/or obstructed the local teleport gates leading to the island. This team also works to protect mutant travelers and refugees from threats. The team's series Marauders debuted in 2019.

== Fictional team biography ==
The Marauders featured on the X-Men #200 wraparound cover, with art by Humberto Ramos. Several characters include Vertigo, Riptide, Sunfire, Harpoon, Scalphunter, Malice, Gambit and Lady Mastermind.

The first Marauders team debuted in Uncanny X-Men #210 (Oct. 1986), during a crossover called the "Mutant Massacre" where the team was sent to slaughter the Morlocks. This issue introduced the characters Arclight, Harpoon, Malice, Scalphunter, Scrambler, and Riptide. Two other Marauders, Blockbuster and Prism, made their first appearance in a later chapter of the "Mutant Massacre" featured in X-Factor #10. The original Marauders team included pre-existing villains Sabretooth and Vertigo, with the other members having been created for the "Mutant Massacre" story by writer Chris Claremont and artist John Romita Jr.

In The Uncanny X-Men #212, Mister Sinister is mentioned as the leader of the Marauders. He is seen in silhouette in The Uncanny X-Men #213 (1986) when Sabretooth's mind is scanned. He does not appear with the team (or debut in comics) until The Uncanny X-Men #221 (1987). Although it is Mister Sinister's team, it is revealed in The Uncanny X-Men #350 (1997) that it was Gambit recruited and organized the team.

X-Men #34 (1994) revealed that Mister Sinister regularly clones dead Marauders so they can serve him again. Gambit vol. 3 #8 (1999) adds that each Marauder clone is made so their minds will shut down if they attempt to betray Sinister. The 1996 miniseries The Further Adventures of Cyclops and Phoenix revealed that Sinister hired a group of criminals known as the Marauders during the 19th century, retroactively making it the first incarnation of the group.

X-Men #200 (2007) featured the original Marauders team with several new members, including Omega Sentinel (possessed by Malice), Lady Mastermind, Sunfire, Gambit, and Mystique. The team worked alongside members of the Acolytes. Following Sinister's apparent death during the crossover "X-Men: Messiah Complex", many dormant Marauder clones awakened and fought the new X-Force team in X-Force (vol. 3) #9. The one-shot X-Men Origins: Gambit (2009) includes flashbacks to Gambit's recruitment of the Marauders – the comic's writer Mike Carey highlighted that artist David Yardin "depicts the first meeting of the Marauders, the first time they're all together in one room, and you get a sense of how powerful and overbearing these personalities are and the tensions between them".

In Astonishing X-Men (vol. 3) #48, a new version of the Marauders appeared whose members included: Arclight, Blockbuster, Harpoon, Prism, Vanisher, and Chimera (serving as the new leader). Mister Sinister later formed another incarnation of the Marauders team consisting of Aries, Azimuth, Chimera, and Coda. Several of the original Marauders (or at least their clones) were killed by Chamber in The Uncanny X-Men (vol. 2) #18 (2019).

=== Krakoan Age ===
The X-Men franchise titles were rebooted for the 2019 event Dawn of X. Professor X, Magneto, and the X-Men, along with many mutant allies and former enemies, created a new mutant community on Krakoa, a self-sufficient living island, and offered sanctuary to all mutants. Various teleport gates were created across Earth to allow mutants entry to Krakoa; if a mutant brings a human with them voluntarily, that human must ask for permission from Krakoa to use the gateway. Kitty Pryde then created a team to help transport those mutants whose native countries did not recognize Krakoa and blocked the local gates that would allow mutants to travel there. Pryde named this team the Marauders, and recruited former X-Men Iceman, Storm, and Bishop, along with Pyro. The team appears in their own series Marauders, which started publication in 2019. Screen Rant highlighted that "the Marauders are functionally the Krakoan navy in the Dawn of X era and are an extension of both the X-Men and the high stakes machinations of the Hellfire Club".

In the 2020 series Hellions, the team heads to Nebraska to destroy Mr. Sinister's defunct clone farm, however, they discover "that Sinister's original team of Marauders have been strung up like pigs in a butcher shop". These Marauders had been turned into zombie-like slaves of Madelyne Pryor; Pryor planned on attacking Krakoa with clones of the Marauders. Afterwards, the Quiet Council approves the resurrection of the original Marauders.

The Marauders series was relaunched in 2022 as part of Destiny of X. In the second volume, Kitty Pryde and Bishop recruit a new team of Marauders in Marauders Annual #1 – the initial roster included Aurora, Daken, Psylocke (Kwannon), Somnus, and Tempo. Screen Rant commented that in the first volume the Marauders were "tasked with protecting the interests of the Hellfire Trading Company's black-market and rescuing mutant refugees feeling from unfriendly nations, returning them to safety on Krakoa. Now that most of the world's mutants have been relocated to Krakoa from dangerous territories, and X-Force taking on more responsibility with retrieving stolen Hellfire goods, Pryde is repositioning her Marauders team as a mutant Search and Rescue squad".

== Members ==
=== Original roster ===
Member	First appearance	Description
Arclight	The Uncanny X-Men #210 (Oct. 1986)	Philippa Sontag is a super-strong mutant. Her mutation allows her to release shockwaves, cause disorientation to her enemies, cause objects to shatter, and generate earth tremors in limited areas. She served with the American ground forces in the Vietnam War, and is still haunted by memories of that place. She has a romantic interest in Scalphunter.
Blockbuster	The Uncanny X-Men #210 (Oct. 1986)	Michael Baer is a superhumanly strong mutant who has withstood punches from Thor, though a single hammer blow from an enraged Thor killed him. He did some work with German terrorists before working for Mister Sinister.
Harpoon	The Uncanny X-Men #210 (Oct. 1986)	Kodiak Noatak is a young Inuit who can charge objects (usually his Slayspears – 20 pound (9 kg) barbed harpoons) with bio-energy for various effects.
Malice	The Uncanny X-Men #210 (Oct. 1986)	Alice MacAllister is an incorporeal psychic being with the ability to possess others. Malice was apparently killed by Sinister for disobeying orders, but returned as a digital entity and possessed Omega Sentinel.
Prism	X-Factor #10 (Nov. 1986)	Robbie is an overconfident and cold-blooded killer who often overestimates the fragility of his crystalline body, which can deflect or reflect most forms of energy attacks, but not physical impact.
Riptide	The Uncanny X-Men #210 (Oct. 1986)	Janos Questad is a brutally evil man who can spin his body at superhuman speeds and fling out shurikens (made from a resin his skin secretes).
Sabretooth	Iron Fist #14 (Aug. 1977)	Victor Creed is the longtime enemy of Wolverine.
Scalphunter	The Uncanny X-Men #210 (Oct. 1986)	John Greycrow is a Comanche ex-G.I., and the group's tactician. He has a powerful healing factor and can manipulate any technological device, a power he uses to create a number of weapons from his battle armor. Initially known as Scalphunter, Greycrow eventually dropped the codename and joined the Hellions, seeking redemption.
Scrambler	The Uncanny X-Men #210 (Oct. 1986)	Kim Il Sung is a Korean mutant who can manipulate powers and systems, whether they be biogenetic, electromagnetic, or even technomechanical, such as mutant abilities, upon physical contact. He is a psychopath more concerned with looking stylish than with the suffering he inflicts on others.
Vertigo	Marvel Fanfare #1 (March 1982)	A mutate from the Savage Land who fights the X-Men. She has the ability to psionically induce dizziness and nausea in others.

=== Second roster ===
The Marauders in Messiah Complex. Art by Simone Bianchi.

During the Messiah Complex storyline, five former X-Men joined the original roster of the Marauders, and Sabretooth was not among the group.

- Gambit (Remy LeBeau): Before joining the X-Men, Gambit was hired by Sinister to assemble the Marauders. Feeling responsible for the deaths of hundreds of Morlocks, Gambit kept this a secret from the X-Men until Rogue absorbed his memories and found out Gambit's secret. His brainwashing by Apocalypse and manipulation by Sinister led him to abandon the X-Men, though he has since returned to the team.
- Lady Mastermind (Regan Wyngarde): An illusion-creating mutant and the daughter of Jason Wyngarde / Mastermind.
- Mystique: A shapeshifter, mother of Nightcrawler and the adoptive mother of Rogue. She infiltrated the X-Men to betray them from within.
- Sunfire (Shiro Yoshida): A Japanese mutant and former X-Man with fire generation and manipulation abilities.
- Omega Sentinel (Karima Shapandar)
- Exodus (Bennet Du Paris)

=== Third roster ===
After the Schism storyline, two enemies of the X-Men joined the Marauders.

- Chimera: A former interdimensional pirate from an unknown Earth, who can generate dragon-shaped flares of greenish-transparent ectoplasmic energy to strike her enemies on various planes of being (i.e. physical, astral, etc.).
- Vanisher (Telford Porter): Longtime criminal and former member of the X-Force, he possesses the ability to teleport.

=== Fifth roster ===
As part of the All-New, All-Different Marvel event, Mister Sinister has formed another incarnation of the Marauders. Besides Chimera, this membership consisted of:

- Aries: A mutant who possesses ram-like horns and superhuman strength.
- Azimuth: A mutant who can unhinge her jaws to form an oral singularity/black hole that can disrupt even Nightcrawler's teleportation.
- Coda: A mutant who has a mummy-like appearance and forked tongue.

== Other versions ==
=== Age of Apocalypse ===
An alternate universe iteration of the Marauders appears in Age of Apocalypse, consisting of Arcade, Dirigible, Owl, and Red. This version of the group are a band of human terrorists who serve Apocalypse.

=== House of M ===
An alternate universe iteration of the Marauders appears in House of M, led by Callisto and consisting of Banshee, Black Tom Cassidy, Blob, Caliban, Mammomax, Sunder, and T-Rex. This version is a covert ops group.

=== Mutant X ===
An alternate universe iteration of the Marauders appears in Mutant X, consisting of Cannonball, Jubilee, Husk, Sunspot and Wolfsbane. This version of the group are thieves.

=== Ultimate Marvel ===
An alternate universe iteration of the Marauders appears in Ultimate X-Men. This version of the group are white supremacists led by Arnim Zola.

=== What If? ===
The Marauders are featured in What If? vol. 2 #101.

== In other media ==
=== Television ===
The Marauders appear in Wolverine and the X-Men, consisting of Mister Sinister, Arclight, Blockbuster, Harpoon, Multiple Man, Vertigo, and Archangel.

=== Video games ===
- The Marauders appear in Deadpool, consisting of Mister Sinister, Vertigo, Blockbuster, and Arclight.
- The Marauders appear in Marvel Strike Force, consisting of Mystique, Mister Sinister, Sabretooth, Stryfe, and Madelyne Pryor.
