= Deadpool (video game) =

2013 video game

- Developer: High Moon Studios (Note: Mercenary Technology developed the Windows port.)
- Publisher: Activision
- Director: Sean Miller
- Producer: Brian Johnson
- Designer: Joseph Shackelford
- Programmer: Michael Riccio
- Artist: Damon Wilson-Hart
- Writer: Daniel Way
- Composer: Julian Soule
- Engine: Unreal Engine 3
- Platforms: Windows; PlayStation 3; Xbox 360; PlayStation 4; Xbox One
- Release: Windows, PS3, Xbox 360: NA: June 25, 2013; AU: June 26, 2013; EU: June 28, 2013; PlayStation 4, Xbox One: NA: November 17, 2015; AU: November 17, 2015; EU: November 20, 2015
- Genres: Action-adventure, hack and slash
- Mode: Single-player

Deadpool is an action-adventure video game based on the Marvel Comics antihero of the same name. It was developed by High Moon Studios and published by Activision for PlayStation 3, Windows, and Xbox 360 in June 2013. Written by Daniel Way, the game's story follows Deadpool as he joins forces with Cable and the X-Men in order to thwart Mister Sinister's latest scheme, getting into numerous comedic adventures along the way. Similarly to other media featuring the character, the game includes self-referential humor and numerous fourth wall breaks.

Upon release, the game received mixed reviews, being praised for its humor and plot elements while critiqued for deficiencies in its gameplay. Deadpool, along with most other games published by Activision that had used the Marvel license, was de-listed and removed from all digital storefronts in 2014. The game was re-released on November 18, 2015 on PlayStation 4, Xbox One, and Steam to coincide with the release of the 2016 film based on the character and included all original DLC. On November 16, 2017, the game was once again removed from digital storefronts due to licensing issues.

== Gameplay ==
Deadpool is an action hack and slash, third-person shooter video game. Gameplay mostly consists of fighting enemies using both melee weapons and guns, with new combos becoming available to Deadpool as he progresses through the story and obtains upgrade points. The game frequently breaks the fourth wall by having Deadpool verbally interact with the player based on their skill and progress.

By default, Deadpool is armed with both guns and swords, but he also has access to giant hammers, plasma guns, and a range of other weapons. A short range of teleportation moves are possible as well. As he slowly falls apart while sustaining damage, players must avoid further damage in order to recover. The game also features several stealth segments, where Deadpool is able to eliminate enemies silently with either his melee weapons or guns, though gun "stealth" kills will immediately alert all nearby enemies.

== Plot ==
Deadpool sits in his vulgar apartment when he gets a voice message from Peter Della Penna of High Moon Studios, telling Wade that his pitch for "the most awesome game ever" starring himself is rejected. In response, Deadpool sets off explosives at the studio, forcing them to cooperate; even hiring Nolan North to be his voice actor. When the game's script is delivered to him, Deadpool finds it boring and draws all over it with a red crayon.

Following the first few lines of the script, Deadpool sets out to assassinate corrupt media mogul Chance White. He slaughters all of White's mercenaries before tackling White himself out of his penthouse window and into the sewers (blowing the game's budget in the process by then repeating the events with added special effects for kicks). Arclight and Vertigo of the Marauders appear and rescue White to bring him to their leader, Mister Sinister, forcing Deadpool to give chase. Along the way, the game suddenly becomes 8-bit (the result of Deadpool blowing the game's budget) and is forced to call High Moon to coerce them into fixing it. He then fights Arclight, who causes both herself and Deadpool to fall and be impaled on pipes, which Deadpool survives thanks to his healing factor. Then, after Vertigo causes him to slide down a sewer pipe, Deadpool finds White meeting with Mister Sinister, who has Blockbuster kill him once informed that the mogul's satellites are under his control. Angry at losing his bounty, Deadpool confronts Sinister while also killing Vertigo and knocking out Blockbuster, but is effortlessly reduced to a head by Sinister, who then leaves for Genosha with Blockbuster.

After regenerating, Deadpool awakens to see Wolverine, Rogue, Psylocke, and Domino, who are trying to foil Sinister's plot to conquer the world with his army of clones. Joining them, Deadpool crashes the Blackbird in Genosha, leaving the X-Men unconscious. While wandering through Genosha, Deadpool runs into Cable, who has come from the future to ensure that Sinister's plan does not succeed, as it will inadvertently destroy the world. After Cable explains that Sinister is in a nearby security tower broadcasting a signal to keep the X-Men unconscious, Deadpool decides to infiltrate it to deal with Sinister, despite Cable's protests. Deadpool discovers Sinister wired into the broadcaster and electrocutes him by messing with the controls, destroying the tower and killing Sinister. Cable explains it was a clone, convincing Deadpool to be serious by telling him Sinister's plan will also destroy Deadpool's favorite taco truck. With Cable's help, Deadpool reconfigures a Sentinel boot into a flying machine to take him to Magneto's citadel, only to crash into Rogue in mid-air.

They end up in an abandoned prison, where Blockbuster kidnaps Rogue, prompting Deadpool to seek a rescue romance. After paying Peter to patch the game again, Deadpool eventually finds Rogue in an arena, briefly abandoning his quest upon spotting Sinister, whom he kills. Unfortunately it was another clone, making Deadpool take out his anger by killing Blockbuster. With Rogue injured, Deadpool kisses her to transfer his healing factor, temporarily making her playable. While weakened, Deadpool attempts to blow up the incoming minions, but his pet dog spontaneous appears and brings his grenade back, briefly killing him. His lover Death greets him and explains Sinister has been grave robbing for mutant DNA, leaving the spirits unable to move on. Tasked with collecting the spirits for Death, Deadpool revives in Genosha's catacombs, helps Cable kill Sinister's goons and collecting the spirits. The resulting chaos collapses the catacombs.

After a song by Death, Deadpool reunites with Wolverine on the surface, goes to Magneto's citadel, kills Sinister's remaining soldiers as well as clones of the Marauders and Sinister. The X-Men arrive to help and Sinister easily overpowers them, only to be crushed by Deadpool's Sentinel boot. Cable gives Deadpool a thumbs-up and confirms that this was the real Sinister, and Deadpool calls for the end credits. As they roll, Deadpool is thrilled with how great his game is and talks to High Moon's representative Peter Della Penna who admits that he did not really blow their budget. Deadpool proceeds to do so by causing multiple explosions during the credits.

== Development ==
Deadpool was first announced at the 2012 San Diego Comic-Con. Only a teaser trailer was shown, without platforms to be shown. Shortly after the announcement, an article was unveiled on Marvel's official website confirming the development of the game; the article was written from Deadpool's point of view, saying he hired High Moon Studios to make him a game. Prior to the game's release, the lead designer of the game revealed the basics of the plot in an interview with IGN, saying Deadpool has taken over the studio and is in charge of the game's development. The game was created using Epic Games' Unreal Engine 3 technology, which also powers High Moon's Transformers: Fall of Cybertron.

During High Moon's panel at Comic-Con, a censored version of the trailer was shown twice after an actor dressing up as Deadpool appeared on stage with the developers. Another marketing campaign started with billboards taking the appearance of graffiti covering advertisements for The Amazing Spider-Man, presumably made by Deadpool to crudely advertise his video game. GameSpot later released an advertisement of the game, with Deadpool giving a holiday greeting while telling people to pre-order the game, stating that it would be released in 2013.

High Moon studio head Peter Della Penna revealed later in a press release that Daniel Way had written the story for the game, bringing his signature Deadpool humor to the title. Jokingly according to Penna, "we weren't actually planning on making a Deadpool game. But, Deadpool came by the studio one day, said he was taking over, and that if I didn't hire Marvel writer Daniel Way pronto and make the most amazing Deadpool video game, he'd break both of our arms and beat us to death with them. I have kids, so we're making the game".

== Marketing ==
High Moon Studios announced a "watch and win" sweepstakes that ran during the Spike Video Game Awards, which aired on December 8, 2012. The winner of the contest would be flown to High Moon Studios and appear as an in-game character in the Deadpool video game. The winner appears in the game as a unique big-headed enemy that Deadpool mentions was supposed to be the pizza delivery man at the start of the game. The winner of the contest was Bill Salina, a database administrator from Atlanta, Georgia. He appears as the character Storm Thrower, who, as he is attacked, will name off pizzas.

== Release and availability ==
The game was released for PlayStation 3, Windows, and Xbox 360. A full list of achievements had leaked via the digital distributor Steam. The ESRB rating page was also updated to list a PC version of the game.

Pre-orders were announced by several retail outlets. GameStop and EBGames released the Merc with a Map Pack DLC. Two new maps are also added, the GRT Plaza and Inside the Tower to Deadpool Challenge mode, and also two bonus costumes, the D-Pooly and Uncanny X-Force suits only for use in the unlockable Infinite mode where stats are tracked on a global leaderboard.

=== Removal and eighth-generation ports ===
On January 1, 2014, Activision's license to create games with Marvel comics characters expired, resulting in Deadpool and numerous other Marvel Games titles published by Activision to be removed from online storefronts such as Steam and PlayStation Network, and Xbox Live. Activision no longer had a right to make downloadable content, trading cards, and patches to the game. Despite this, on July 15, 2015, Deadpool was made available for purchase on Steam for PC again. The title was made no longer available to purchase from the Steam store again on November 16, 2017, but players who purchased it while it was available are still able to download and play the game through the Steam client.

On August 31, 2015, Activision announced that they would remaster the game for the PlayStation 4 and Xbox One. The game was re-released on November 17 in North America and Australia, and November 20 in the United Kingdom. It is unknown how Activision reacquired the rights to re-publish Deadpool, but it is believed that the re-release was timed to help promote the then-upcoming Deadpool film, released a few months after the next-gen version of the game. The game has since been delisted again.

== Reception ==
Reception

Aggregate score
Aggregator	Score
Metacritic	(PC) 63/100 (PS3) 61/100 (PS4) 60/100 (X360) 62/100 (XBO) 57/100

Review scores
Publication	Score
Electronic Gaming Monthly	8/10
Eurogamer	6/10
Game Informer	6/10
GameSpot	5.5/10
GameTrailers	5.5/10
Giant Bomb	2/5
IGN	6/10
Joystiq	3/5
PlayStation Official Magazine – UK	5/10
Official Xbox Magazine (US)	8/10
PC Gamer (UK)	60%
Polygon	7/10
Digital Spy	3/5
The Escapist	3.5/5

High Moon Studios showed an early demo of the video game to journalists at Gamescom 2012, where the game earned a nomination for Best of Show. Several sites wrote positive impressions of the demo that was shown at Gamescom and the Electronic Entertainment Expo (E3), including Joystiq and GameSpot.

Deadpool received "mixed" reviews on all platforms according to the review aggregation website Metacritic. Critics praised the humor, the original story, and faithfulness to the comics, but criticized the controls, combat, and repetitive gameplay.

411Mania said, "Deadpool isn't going to win any end of the year awards, but not every game has to." They appreciated its unique fourth-wall breaking gameplay sequences and humor, but criticized its repetitiveness. GameZone called it "a fun little romp. If you can tolerate Deadpool's demented humor, you'll find a nice few hours of entertainment within the game". The Escapist praised the combat system and humor, although claimed "it has its share of controller-throwing difficulty problems and hit-or-miss jokes". Digital Spy said it was "far from a bad game, yet the developers' over-reliance on the appeal of the source material means it rarely shoots for the stars". However, The Digital Fix said it was "Nowhere near as awesome as Deadpool would have you believe". Edge called it "an indisputably poor game, one whose knowing winks and quips come off not as metacommentary but as tacit apologia for its litany of specific failings".
