= X2: Wolverine's Revenge =

2003 video game

- North American PlayStation 2 cover art featuring Hugh Jackman as Wolverine
- Developers: GenePool Software; Warthog Games (PS2); Vicarious Visions (GBA); LTI Gray Matter (PC); Aspyr (Mac)
- Publishers: Activision; Aspyr (Mac)
- Designer: Haydn Dalton
- Programmers: Mike Anthony, Martin Turton, Kevin Edwards, Mike Ferenduros; Jason L. Maynard & Michael S. Livesay (PC)
- Artist: Han Randhawa
- Writers: Larry Hama; Craig Houston (additional script material & script editor)
- Composer: Ian Livingstone
- Platforms: PlayStation 2, GameCube, Xbox, Microsoft Windows, Game Boy Advance, Mac OS X
- Release: PlayStation 2, Xbox, GameCube, Game Boy Advance, & Windows: NA: April 15, 2003; PAL: April 17, 2003; Mac: NA: October 2003; EU: December 11, 2003
- Genres: Action-adventure, beat 'em up
- Mode: Single-player

X2: Wolverine's Revenge (released as X-Men 2: Wolverine's Revenge in Europe and Australia) is a 2003 action-adventure video game based on the Marvel Comics character Wolverine, a member of the mutant team X-Men. The GameCube and Xbox versions were developed by GenePool Software, the PlayStation 2 version by Warthog Games, the Windows version by LTI Gray Matter, and the Game Boy Advance version by Vicarious Visions. The game was published by Activision on April 15, 2003, to coincide with the release of the film X2.

In X2: Wolverine's Revenge, the player helps Wolverine fight his way past the heavily guarded areas of the Weapon X Facility to piece together fragmented clues to Wolverine's murky past and to save his life. Wolverine has 48 hours to find an antidote to the deadly Shiva Virus circulating in his bloodstream and the clues point to the Weapon X facility, the Canadian fortress where he had his skeletal structure fused with adamantium.

While Hugh Jackman's likeness is on the cover and promotional material, Wolverine is voiced by actor Mark Hamill, and the in-game character model is based on his comic-book appearances. Patrick Stewart reprises his role as Professor X from the film series.

The game received generally mixed reviews upon release. Critics praised the voice acting, especially of Hamill and Stewart, the intriguing plot, and unlockables, but criticized the slow combat, lack of mid-level checkpoints, and for being too hard and requiring too many retries.

== Gameplay ==
Similar to Spider-Man, Wolverine's Revenge is an action-adventure and beat 'em up game played from a third-person perspective spread across six acts. Playing as Wolverine, the player can retract or extend his adamantium claws, punch, kick, and slide tackle to fight various armored soldiers and mutant creatures. The player can earn points by performing Strikes, where Wolverine stylishly attacks his surrounding enemies, and can also earn a "Bowling bonus" by stunning an enemy with claws retracted or a kick, picking them up and throwing them into another enemy. Strike moves can also be used to finish off stunned enemies. The game also features a stealth system.

The player can also use Wolverine's heightened senses by pressing and holding a specific button. At this moment, the screen (except for Wolverine and the enemies) turns into an orange tint and allows the player to see foot prints of an enemy, his position (indicated by a pulsating red arrow above him), his green scent trails, lasers, a ghost of Wolverine about to take him down, and invisible mines, indicated by large spinning circles on the ground, as well as illuminating dark areas. Using the senses also puts the player into a stealth mode where Wolverine can sneak up behind an unsuspecting enemy and instantly kill them, rewarding them with dog tags, which when a certain amount is collected, grants the player access to more damaging Strikes. He can also hug walls to kill any enemies lurking around corners. The player can also earn tags by performing Triple Strikes.

Another mechanic is Wolverine's feral rage. Whenever he damages an enemy or he himself gets damaged by an enemy, his rage meter gradually fills up. When full, or if the player double taps the claw extension button when any red of the meter is showing, Wolverine enters a temporary rage, where he moves faster and kills enemies quicker for a limited amount of time. The player can also trigger Wolverine's healing ability by retracting his claws, at the cost of being able to destroy destructible objects or slash open fences.

Each of the game's acts culminates with a boss fight between one of Wolverine's archenemies including Sabretooth (who is fought twice), Magneto, Wendigo, Lady Deathstrike, and Juggernaut. They often involve using specific Strike moves on them (ex. Wolverine grabs Wendigo's tail and throws him, and Wolverine leaps on Juggernaut's head to attack him), avoiding their attacks and finding an opening. Throughout the game, Professor X assists the player with his telepathy, often giving hints and advice.

There are also collectables scattered throughout the game. Comic books unlock alternate outfits for Wolverine, including his classic blue and yellow outfit, his Ultimate X-Men outfit, a prototype outfit designed by Alex Ross and the uniform depicted in the X-Men films. Cerebro files unlock character model viewers, with Patrick Stewart narrating the character's backstories. The player can also find collectables to fill the health and rage meters quicker.

== Plot ==
In 1968, a younger Logan is betrayed and kidnapped by members of the Canadian Secret Service and sent to the Weapon X facility, where the indestructible metal Adamantium is grafted to his entire skeleton and claws. He is also fitted with equipment to make him a subservient assassin. Breaking through his reprogramming, Logan vows revenge on his captors, turning on the security guards and fighting his way into the facility. Inside, he encounters failed subjects of the Weapon X programming, including his nemesis Sabretooth, whom he defeats. Entering the main laboratory, Logan allows Abraham Cornelius and Carol Hines to escape before confronting The Professor, who informs him that all Weapon X subjects were implanted with a dormant killer virus known as the Shiva Strain, but due to Logan's enhanced regeneration, it is unknown when the virus would take effect.

In present day, Logan - now the X-Man Wolverine - recounts his tale to Beast in the X-Mansion's lab. A physical examination concludes that the Shiva strain will take effect in two days, bypassing Logan's healing factor and killing him. Professor Charles Xavier sends Logan on a mission to return to the Weapon X facility and find an antidote, hiring a private cargo plane and maintaining psychic contact via Cerebro. The plane is shot down, to the apparent delight of the pilot, who is killed in the crash. Surviving the attack, Logan infiltrates a Weapon X outpost and encounters the Wendigo in a cave before discreetly boarding a truck bound for the facility. When ambushed inside, Logan is rescued by a guard who turns on his comrades, leaving his motivations unclear. Logan accesses the main terminal and finds that all records have been transferred to the Void, a mutant detention center. Outside, he is ambushed but victorious in a battle with Sabretooth, who has half of the formula of the antidote. Logan passes the formula to Xavier via their psychic link and spares Sabretooth.

At the Void, Logan is greeted by fellow X-Man Colossus, who is working as a security guard and allows Logan to sneak in and confront Hines and Cornelius. They provide Logan with the complete formula for the antidote, but an energy shield severs Logan's connection to Xavier. Meanwhile, Sabretooth also infiltrates the Void and releases the three most high-risk prisoners - Omega Red, Juggernaut and Magneto. Logan and Colossus team up to defeat Juggernaut and disable the energy shield. Xavier and Beast begin synthesizing the antidote while Logan tracks Magneto. May Deuce, a cyborg mutant hunter is dispatched from the Void to hunt Wolverine and the escaped prisoners, with lethal force authorized. Magneto heads to a smelting factory to use an electromagnet to disable the inhibitor collar on his neck that dampens his powers. Logan is able to track him down, but forced to face advanced mutant hunters with equipment designed to counteract his abilities. Magneto offers his respect to Logan, who still holds a grudge from their last encounter, when Magneto forcibly removed the adamantium from Logan's skeleton.

After defeating Magneto and the Mutant Hunters, Logan is told to head to the top of a skyscraper known as the Xenon building to receive the Shiva antidote and return to the X-Mansion. May Deuce, seemingly showing gratitude for Logan's takedown of Magneto, offers him a lift to the Xenon building aboard her aircraft, only to toss him off onto the roof. Lady Deathstrike is there waiting, revealing that the cargo pilot, the traitorous Weapon X guard and May Deuce were all cyborgs under her control, while Sabretooth was additionally under her employ. Her plot had been to ensure Logan's suffering before leading him to her for her revenge, citing that her father's work on the Adamantium bonding process - her perceived legacy - had been stolen by Logan. Though weakened by the Shiva virus now taking hold, Logan defeats Deathstrike, who willingly falls to her apparent death, forebodingly promising her revenge. Rogue arrives in the X-Jet to provide Logan with the Shiva antidote and send him back to the X-Mansion. Sabretooth finds a vial of the cure found on Deathstrike's body and takes her body away. Meanwhile, Mister Sinister and Apocalypse plot to turn Logan into a Horseman of Apocalypse. Logan awakes from a restless sleep, remembering that Omega Red is still at large.

=== Deleted scene ===
In all versions (except for the Game Boy Advance version) if the player collects all dog tags, a deleted scene is unlocked. Before his battle with Magneto, Logan is approached by Spider-Man, who offers his aid, to which Logan politely declines.

== Development ==
Before the game's announcement at E3 2002, then-new Liverpool-based studio GenePool Software was developing a game based on the long-running New X-Men comic book series titled Weapon X. It was planned to follow Wolverine's origin story which features his first encounter with his former friend-turned-rival and arch-enemy Sabretooth. The game was announced at E3 2002 by publisher Activision as X-Men: Wolverine's Revenge with no relation to the 2003 film X2. However, shortly before X2's release, the game's title was renamed as X2: Wolverine's Revenge for release to tie-in with the film's release. Despite this, it featured an original story by famed comic book writer Larry Hama, and does not take place in the continuity of the film series, but had a closer resemblance to the Marvel Universe instead.

== Reception ==
Reception

Aggregate scores
Aggregator	Score				
Aggregator	GBA	GameCube	PC	PS2	Xbox
GameRankings	76.67%	67.25%	60.83%	61.79%	65.07%
Metacritic	72/100	62/100	55/100	58/100	58/100

Review scores
Publication	Score				
Publication	GBA	GameCube	PC	PS2	Xbox
AllGame	2.5/5			2.5/5	
Eurogamer				5/10	
Famitsu					25/40
Game Informer		5.75/10		5.5/10	5.5/10
GamePro				2.5/5	2.5/5
GameRevolution		D+		D+	D+
GameSpot		5.8/10	5.7/10	5.8/10	5.8/10
GameSpy		2/5	1/5	2/5	2/5
GameZone	8/10	6.7/10	6.5/10	5.6/10	7.8/10
IGN	7.9/10	6.6/10	6.5/10	7.3/10	6.6/10
Nintendo Power	3.9/5	3.7/5			
Official U.S. PlayStation Magazine				3/5	
Official Xbox Magazine (US)					5.9/10
PC Gamer (US)			70%		
The Cincinnati Enquirer		3.5/5	3.5/5	3.5/5	3.5/5
Entertainment Weekly		C−		C−	C−

X2: Wolverine's Revenge was met with mixed reviews upon release. GameRankings gave it a score of 67.25% for the GameCube version; 61.79% for the PlayStation 2 version; 76.67% for the GBA version; 60.83% for the PC version; and 65.07% for the Xbox version. Likewise, Metacritic gave it a score of 62 out of 100 for the GameCube version; 58 out of 100 each for the PS2 and Xbox versions; 72 out of 100 for the GBA version; and 55 out of 100 for the PC version.

Common criticisms include clunky and alienating stealth mechanics, bland visuals, lack of checkpoints, and high and unforgiving difficulty, making the game unfairly hard. Official UK PlayStation 2 Magazine gave the game 7 out of 10, describing it as follows: "a quality action adventure that blends stealth with hand-to-hand combat. Only a few irritations deny this a higher score". Of the said irritations, the most prominently criticized element was the lack of mid-mission checkpoints, forcing players to replay large sections upon death. Maxim gave the game a score of eight out of ten and said, "while most of Revenge’s game play involves turning bad guys into kebab, the game’s strict homage to the comic gives it more depth". The Village Voice gave the Xbox version a score of seven out of ten and said, "deploying your special powers is motivation enough to move through the game's booby-trapped military complexes, crash sites, mines, caves, and places that look like mines or caves". The Cincinnati Enquirer also gave it three-and-a-half stars out of five and stated that "controlling Wolverine during combat can prove difficult, especially when there are multiple enemies onscreen simultaneously". However, Entertainment Weekly gave it a C− and stated that "the pacing is sluggish, the gameplay irritating, and ultimately it feels like Wolverine is exacting revenge on the wrong person: the player".
