= Adam X the X-Treme =

Adam Neramani Adam X
- Cover to X-Force #30

Publication information
- Publisher: Marvel Comics
- First appearance: X-Force Annual #2 (October 1993)
- Created by: Fabian Nicieza; Tony Daniel

In-story information
- Alter ego: Adam Neramani
- Species: Human mutant / Shi'ar hybrid
- Team affiliations: Strong Industries; Shi'ar Imperium; Crystal Claws
- Notable aliases: Adam-X the X-Treme; Ascendant One; X-Treme; Adam-X
- Abilities: Superhuman strength, speed, sight, and stamina; Energy manipulation within oxygenated blood

Adam Neramani is a character appearing in American comic books published by Marvel Comics. Created by writer Fabian Nicieza and artist Tony Daniel, the character first appeared in X-Force Annual #2 (October 1993). Adam Neramani is a half-alien half-mutant. As part of an effort to diversify the genes of the royal Shi'ar bloodline, he was genetically engineered using the DNA of Emperor D'Ken and Katherine Summers, making him the half-brother of Scott Summers. Adam is also known as Adam-X, X-Treme, and Adam X the X-Treme.

== Publication history ==
=== Concept and creation ===
In 1993, Fabian Nicieza introduced Adam Neramani as a grunge-inspired character who was part mutant, part Shi'ar, and whose origin contained hints that he might be the half-brother of Cyclops and Havok. However, this storyline was left unresolved when Nicieza departed from the X-Men series in 1995. Nicieza later confirmed that he intended Adam to be the half-brother of Cyclops and Havok:

Adam X was intended to be the illegitimate offspring of D'Ken and Kate Summers. Taken from D'Ken and raised on a farming planet.

It was later revealed that, after the Shi'ar recognized the potential of the Summers bloodline, they engineered another child by combining the DNA of Emperor D'Ken and Katherine Summers. This child, Adam Neramani, was developed in an artificial womb but grew up unaware of his true lineage. His journey eventually led him to Earth, where his mutant ability to ignite blood first manifested.

=== Publication history ===
Adam Neramani debuted in X-Force Annual #2 (October 1993), created by Fabian Nicieza and Tony Daniel. He appeared in the 2020 X-Factor series, and in the 2021 X-Men Legends series.

== Fictional character biography ==
Finding himself on Earth and unaware of his own past, Adam-X works for industrialist Martin Strong helping bring mutants to a Strong Industries plant where he would seemingly give them shelter. In exchange, Strong promises to help Adam-X regain his identity. During this time, Adam-X develops a close friendship with fellow mutant Michelle Balters, also known as Neurotap. Unbeknown to Adam-X, Strong Industries is funded by Project Wideawake to exterminate the "X" gene that gives mutants their powers. Discovering the truth, Balters flees from Strong Industries and Adam-X is sent to bring her back in.

Adam-X and X-Force eventually join to combat Martin Strong, once they discover that he is a mutant himself. Adam-X and Shatterstar, in particular, discover a mutual affinity due to their alien mutant status and love of battle. X-Force membership is offered to Adam-X but he declines, choosing instead to find his past and find who he is.

While traveling in the Canadian Yukon wilderness, Adam-X witnesses Phillip Summers' plane crash. Adam-X is able to rescue Summers before his plane explodes. Adam-X uses his mutant power to "heat" Summers' blood and keep him warm until he finally manages to carry him to a hospital. They are greeted by Summers' grandson, Cyclops and Cyclops' wife, Jean Grey. The two X-Men thank Adam-X for his efforts and, using Jean's telepathy, Adam-X is able to share some of his memories with Phillip, showing him the ships he flew while with the Shi'ar.

Adam-X meets Captain Marvel, and the two encounter Shi'ar agent Davan Shakari (aka Erik the Red). Shakari reveals that Adam-X is the human/Shi'ar hybrid son of Emperor D'Ken. Adam-X kills Shakari.

=== S.W.O.R.D. ===
Adam-X is one of the many aliens arrested under orders from Henry Peter Gyrich, who had orchestrated a coup with the alien-monitoring agency S.W.O.R.D. He is imprisoned with many other earth-dwelling aliens, such as Beta Ray Bill and Ultra Girl. All the aliens are released by Abigail Brand, the former leader of S.W.O.R.D. Adam-X assists in driving off an alien invasion and is allowed to go free.

=== Fear Itself ===
Among the over 50 plans Cyclops utilized to try to stop Juggernaut, Adam X was used to ignite Juggernaut's blood. The result was "worse than ineffective" as Juggernaut remained unstoppable, and for 15 minutes, burned anything he touched.

=== Summers family ===
The anthology title X-Men Legends reveals that Adam is genetically related to the Summers family, as genetic information from Katherine Summers was used in his creation.

== Powers and abilities ==
Adam Neramani is a Shi'ar-mutant hybrid. He possesses superhuman strength, speed, sight, and stamina, abilities that are typical of the Shi'ar race. Adam's mutant powers allow him to ignite oxygenated blood, causing intense, immobilizing pain.

== Reception ==
George Marston of Newsarama said that Adam Neramani perfectly embodies '90s superhero clichés, evident just by looking at him. He found that the character goes beyond the typical trends of the era, even calling himself "X-Treme" in a time when adding an "X" to anything made it a hit. Marston also stated that Adam's powers, like his blood being acid that can catch fire, and his exaggerated look push the '90s comic book style to its extreme, make him stand out as a symbol of the era, pushing the boundaries of superhero tropes.
