= X-Men Forever =

Comic book series

- Cover to X-Men Forever #1 (2009), by Tom Grummett

Publication information
- Publisher: Marvel Comics
- Schedule: 2001 series: monthly 2009 series: biweekly 2010 series: biweekly
- Format: 2001 series: mini-series 2009 series: ongoing 2010 series: ongoing
- Genre: Superhero
- Publication date: 2001 – 2011
- No. of issues: 2001 series: 6; 2009 series: 24, 1 annual, 1 giant-size 2010 series: 16

Creative team
- Written by: 2001 series: Fabian Nicieza; 2009 series: Chris Claremont; 2010 series: Chris Claremont
- Artist(s): 2001 series: Kevin Maguire; 2009 series: Various; 2010 series: Tom Grummett

Collected editions
- X-Men Forever, Volume 1: ISBN 0785136797
- X-Men Forever, Volume 2: ISBN 0785136800

X-Men Forever is the name of three comic book series published by Marvel Comics featuring the mutant superhero group the X-Men. The first is a 2001 miniseries, unrelated to the others. The second and third are the work of writer Chris Claremont.

== 2001 series ==
The 2001 miniseries, written by Fabian Nicieza and Kevin Maguire, with inking by Andrew Pepoy, starred Jean Grey, Iceman, Mystique, Toad, and Juggernaut. Time travel was used as a plot device to explore the themes and history of the X-Men, and to resolve several dangling plotlines. The story takes place during several different points in the past, until they are eventually brought back to the present. The miniseries consisted of six standard-length issues.

== 2009 series ==
In February 2009, Marvel announced a second X-Men Forever, which began its run on June 10, 2009. It ran semimonthly as a regular title, set in an alternate continuity of the Marvel Universe (Earth-161). This second series is unrelated to the earlier series by the same name.

The series, written by veteran X-Men author Chris Claremont, was originally advertised as a continuation of the storylines he intended for Uncanny X-Men and X-Men in 1991, which never saw print because of his resignation from the title.

Despite the original billing as what "would have been written" by Claremont had he never left, the series quickly diverged from that idea into a more traditional "alternate universe" title. In an interview conducted with Wizard Universe, Claremont acknowledged that what he was doing in X-Men Forever would never have been possible in the primary X-Men books because of the corporate needs of Marvel Comics:

The one significant difference and advantage that Forever has over Uncanny is that we don't have to worry about corporate needs. The one great disadvantage with Fantastic Four or with X-Men or with Spider-Man or with any book in the mainstream Marvel line is that the characters must be preserved for Marvel's sake. But since these characters are being preserved in Uncanny, they can be altogether frighteningly mortal in Forever, as we'll be demonstrating fairly early on. The fact is, if a character is unlucky enough to die, it's a real thing and it isn't corrected a week later. They won't come back. There are consequences and from that basis everything proceeds.

X-Men Forever Alpha, which was released in May 2009, was largely a reprint of the first three issues of the 1991 X-Men. The last pages were devoted to a bridge story meant to segue into X-Men Forever, including a scene that hints at the death of Wolverine. X-Men Forever began its run proper the next month, in June 2009. The first five issues take place on the same night, and resolve long-hanging plot threads left from Claremont's departure from the title in 1991. Among the events that occur in the first issue is the death of Wolverine at the hands of Storm, whose true nature is left undisclosed, outside of a stated allegiance to a group called the Consortium. The series revolves around the team of Cyclops, Jean Grey, Rogue, Shadowcat, Nightcrawler, Beast, Sabretooth, and Professor X as they learn about and deal with the anti-mutant group the Consortium and a mutant-killing condition known as Burnout. Other major changes from the mainstream continuity include Sabretooth being Wolverine's father, Professor X not being crippled by the Shadow King during the Muir Island Saga, and Cyclops's son Nathan never being infected with the techno-organic virus or becoming Cable. Sabretooth incorporates himself into the X-Men by claiming he is seeking revenge for his fallen son, Logan.

Marvel released X-Men Forever Annual #1 in April 2010, which dealt with Wolverine and Jean Grey's relationship, elaborating on their relationship in more detail, including insight to the betrayed heart of Cyclops. X-Men Forever Giant Size #1 involved the Shi'ar Imperial Guard desiring something from Professor X and the X-Men, resulting in a battle between the two teams.

== 2010 series ==
In July 2010, X-Men Forever was cancelled and replaced by X-Men Forever 2 in August 2010 (also set on Earth-161). The story picked up on the growing threat of Consortium and the Burnout disease, with the X-Men going undercover from society, as well as the Consortium taking control of S.H.I.E.L.D. It added Mystique and the Starjammers to the reoccurring cast. The series was cancelled at issue #16, leaving several dangling plot threads regarding the condition of Nightcrawler and the kidnapping of Nathan Summers. Likewise, a cure for Burnout is never developed and the Wolverine clone who tormented Shadowcat in her nightmares is never brought to justice. Mister Sinister was implied as the main behind-the-scenes antagonist, but never actually appeared. The series ended by revealing the true nature of the "Perfect Storm" character and her counterpart, little 'Ro. This final arc showed how certain events from the "X-Tinction Agenda" arc happened quite differently.
