= The Further Adventures of Cyclops and Phoenix =

Comic book mini-series

Further Adventures of Cyclops and Phoenix
- Cover to issue #1

Publication information
- Publisher: Marvel Comics
- Schedule: Monthly
- Format: Mini-series
- Genre: Superhero
- Publication date: June – September 1996
- No. of issues: 4
- Main character(s): Cyclops; Phoenix; Mister Sinister; Apocalypse

Creative team
- Written by: Peter Milligan
- Penciller: John Paul Leon
- Inker: Klaus Janson
- Letterer: Comicraft
- Colorist: Kevin Somers
- Editor: Mark Powers

Collected editions
- Further Adventures of Cyclops and Phoenix: ISBN 0-7851-0556-5

The Further Adventures of Cyclops and Phoenix is a four-issue comic book mini-series published in 1996 by Marvel Comics.

== Publication history ==
The series is a sequel to the Adventures of Cyclops and Phoenix (1994), and was written by Peter Milligan with pencils by John Paul Leon and inks by Klaus Janson.

== Plot summary ==
The X-Men members Cyclops and Phoenix are brought to Victorian era England in the year 1859. Scientist Nathaniel Essex, obsessed with Charles Darwin's theory of evolution, encounters the centuries-old mutant Apocalypse who transforms him into Mister Sinister.

== Collected editions ==
A trade paperback was produced some time after the mini-series finished publication collecting it into one 96 page volume released in October 1997 (ISBN 0-7851-0556-5). However, it was produced during a period of economic decline for Marvel, and before trades had reached the popularity they would a few years later, and has thus been left out of print.

=== Cyclops & Phoenix series ===
In 2018, both miniseries were collected into a single paperback.

Title	Material collected	Publication date	ISBN
X-Men: The Adventures of Cyclops and Phoenix	THE ADVENTURES OF CYCLOPS & PHOENIX #1-4, THE FURTHER ADVENTURES OF CYCLOPS & PHOENIX #1-4, MATERIAL FROM MARVEL VALENTINE SPECIAL #1	2018	Paperback: 978-1302913793
