= Sabretooth (character) =

Comic book character

- Sabretooth taken from a variant cover of Sabretooth #1 (February 2022). Art by Mico Suayan.

Publication information
- Publisher: Marvel Comics
- First appearance: Iron Fist #14 (August 1977)
- Created by: Chris Claremont (writer); John Byrne (artist)

In-story information
- Alter ego: Victor Creed
- Species: Human mutant
- Team affiliations: Brotherhood of Mutants; X-Men; Team X; Marauders; X-Factor; Weapon X; "Avengers" (1959); Hand; Assassins Guild; Astonishing Avengers; Avengers Unity Division; Lethal Legion
- Notable aliases: Slasher; El Tigre; Der Schlächter ("The Butcher" in German); Wolverine
- Abilities: Superhuman strength, stamina, durability, speed, agility, reflexes, and senses; Healing factor; Claws and fangs or razor-sharp teeth; Expert brawler and decades of combat expertise

Sabretooth (Note: Originally stylized as Sabre-Tooth) is a character appearing in American comic books published by Marvel Comics. Created by Chris Claremont and John Byrne, he first appeared in Iron Fist #14 (August 1977) and was initially depicted as a serial killer known as "the Slasher", before being developed into a supervillain associated with the X-Men during the "Mutant Massacre" crossover in 1986. This portrayal of Sabretooth has endured as the archenemy of the superhero Wolverine.

In his comic book appearances, Sabretooth is the alias of Victor Creed, a psychopathic mutant possessing enhanced senses, fangs or sharp teeth, razor-sharp claws, superhuman strength and reflexes, and regenerative healing abilities. There have been various possible accounts of the origin of Sabretooth's feud with Wolverine. The most common story involves both of them being participants in the Weapon X super-soldier program. After Wolverine escapes and attempts to suppress his animalistic qualities, Sabretooth becomes obsessed with forcing Wolverine to embrace his feral instincts by tormenting him and ruining his life.

In the X-Men film series, Sabretooth is depicted as Wolverine's biological brother, portrayed by Tyler Mane in X-Men (2000) and Deadpool & Wolverine (2024) and by Liev Schreiber in X-Men Origins: Wolverine (2009). In May 2008, the Wizard magazine ranked Sabretooth #193 of the 200 best comic book characters of all time. In 2009, Sabretooth was ranked as IGN's 44th Greatest Comic Book Villain of All Time.

== Publication history ==
The character first appeared in Iron Fist #14 (August 1977) and was created by Chris Claremont and John Byrne. Sabretooth was conceived as a recurring antagonist for Iron Fist, whom he fights several times, including once hidden behind a mask and gloves as "the Slasher". He works for a time with the Constrictor as a partner-in-crime, and clashes repeatedly with Iron Fist and Power Man. Sabretooth also appeared in comics such as The Spectacular Spider-Man. Chris Claremont introduced him as a minor X-Men villain, a member of the Marauders, during the "Mutant Massacre" crossover in 1986.

Sabretooth rose to greater prominence when he was split off from the Marauders and became a recurring antagonist of an individual member of the X-Men, Wolverine. The character was subsequently featured in limited series and one-shot comics including Sabretooth and Mystique and Sabretooth: In the Red Zone, and even had his own ongoing reprint series in the mid-1990s, Sabretooth Classics.

=== Origin ===
Chris Claremont intended for Sabretooth to be Wolverine's father, though this was contradicted by subsequent writers. Claremont, when asked what he had intended to be the relationship between Wolverine and Sabretooth, stated:

Father and son. That's why Sabretooth always considered Logan "sloppy seconds" to his "original" / "real deal." The other critical element in my presentation of their relationship was that, in their whole life, Logan has never defeated Sabretooth in a knock-down, drag-out, kill-or-be-killed berserker fight. By the same token, on every one of his birthdays, Sabretooth has always managed to find him, no matter where Logan was or what he was doing, and come within an inch of killing him. For no other reason than to remind him that he could.

Genetic tests performed by S.H.I.E.L.D. confirmed that Sabretooth and Wolverine were not father and son.

An interviewer asked Paul Jenkins if Dog Logan was Sabretooth. Jenkins had not intended the speculation, but said would not have a problem with another writer doing this later. The miniseries Astonishing Spider-Man & Wolverine has shown that the two characters are not the same person. A one-shot specialty comic entitled X-Men Origins: Sabretooth chronicling some of the character's earliest childhood experiences, differing distinctly from Dog's life. It is also later shown that Sabretooth and Dog are separate people.

== Fictional character biography ==
=== Early life ===
Sabretooth's real name is believed to be Victor Creed. His memories have been tampered with by clandestine organizations such as Weapon X, so much so that there are virtually no credible accounts of Victor's past. (Note: Conflicting accounts in Origin II, Origins: Sabretooth, X-Men, Uncanny X-Men stories published in the 1990s, and the Sabretooth limited series also published in the 1990s) The clearest accounts of his childhood begin with him murdering his brother Luther Creed over a piece of pie. His father Zebediah chained him in the basement like an animal and systematically pulled out Victor's canine teeth, which perennially grew back. Victor begged his mother Victoria to let him go, but she did not. Years passed until Victor gnawed off his own hand to escape the basement and apparently murdered his parents. It is later revealed that Sabretooth only killed his father and took care of his mother financially, visiting her frequently until her death.

Victor is revealed to have had a brother named Saul and a sister named Clara, who are believed to be the reason for Victor's ongoing feud with the X-Men's Wolverine. Saul Creed was a tracker and hunter, while Clara Creed was an animal handler. They helped track down the feral Logan for a circus. They also helped Logan escape after he was experimented on by Nathaniel Essex, and the three go on the run. Saul perceives Logan to be stealing Clara, leading to Saul tipping Essex off regarding Logan's location. In the ensuing chaos, Logan accidentally kills Clara, although her healing factor later revives her. Saul, not knowing this, blames Essex for Clara's death, and the two men seek Essex out, Saul revealing that Clara was his sister. Logan finds out that Saul betrayed them to Essex and drowns Saul in a potion of Essex's. Horrified, Clara asks Wolverine to never look for her again. Victor was then informed about his brother's death. After this, Sabretooth captured Logan and brought him back to be experimented on by Essex at the Ravencroft Institute. However, Essex's assistant Dr. Claudia Russell (ancestor to Jack Russell), freed Logan. Creed and Essex later killed Russell for this and experimented on her corpse.

In an early tale, Logan lives in a small Blackfoot community. One day, Sabretooth tracks him down in Canada and seemingly murders his one-time teammate's lover Silver Fox on Logan's birthday, after Silver Fox rejects him. In this tale, it is indicated that Logan did not have particularly strong feelings for Silver Fox and that the murder was simply the last straw in a series of grievances he held against Sabretooth. Creed adopts a tradition of tracking Logan down on his foe's birthday with the intention of fighting.

=== Early history ===
Creed is recruited into a top secret CIA covert ops unit known as Team X, with allies John Wraith (Kestrel), Logan (Wolverine), Silver Fox (whose death was a hoax), and David North (Maverick). On one mission, the psychopathic Sabretooth kills a crucial scientist during a battle against Russian supersoldier Omega Red, causing Team X to break up. During this period, he fathers a son, Graydon Creed, with the mutant shapeshifter Mystique, who is undercover in the guise of a spy named Leni Zauber. Graydon grows up to found the Friends of Humanity, an anti-mutant organization. While running for president, Graydon is assassinated by a time-traveling Mystique from the future.

After the disbanding of Team X, Logan and Victor meet up again, as friends, when Logan learns of anti-mutant forces within the government. Victor and Logan form a team of rebel mutants, and Victor falls in love with a mutant named Holo. Eventually, Creed grows tired of the fighting and wants to leave with Holo, but she has already decided against it. In the final conflict, Holo is mortally wounded. Creed blames Logan for her death.

Next, Sabretooth is recruited by the Weapon X program, but it is unknown what, if any, enhancements he receives. As part of the program, his memories are tampered with by the psychic mutant Aldo Ferro, also known as Psi-Borg.

In 1968, Creed (using the alias Sabretooth) works as a mercenary assassin in Saigon. An individual called the "White Devil", involved in the disappearance of soldiers and locals, contacts Sabretooth and offers to employ him as one of his own enforcers. Sabretooth accepts.

=== Supervillain ===
Sabretooth battling Spider-Man on the cover of The Spectacular Spider-Man #116. Art by Rich Buckler.

Emerging as a costumed villain, Sabretooth becomes partners with Constrictor, with both working as enforcers for major criminal interests. Sabretooth battles Iron Fist and is badly beaten. Sabretooth and the Constrictor then fight Iron Fist, Luke Cage, Misty Knight, and Colleen Wing only to be defeated again. With Constrictor, Sabretooth begins to stalk and kill others for pleasure, which earns him the newspaper title of "The Slasher".

Sabretooth reunites with his employer, the Foreigner, who claims to have trained the mercenary at some point. He attacks the Black Cat, nearly biting through her leg until he encounters a crowbar hidden underneath her boot. He is defeated by Spider-Man, and outmaneuvered and humiliated by the Black Cat in combat.

Sabretooth eventually encounters a thief by the name of Gambit and the two fight, but find they are not exactly enemies. Later while recruiting for Mister Sinister, Gambit gathers a group of mutant criminals he has associated with who form the Marauders. The Marauders are directed to massacre the Morlocks, which sets Sabretooth in another battle against Wolverine. Sabretooth and the Marauders join in an attack on Polaris, and battle Wolverine again during the Marauders' attempt to kill Madelyne Pryor. Wolverine stabs Sabretooth through the heart and uses Scrambler's power to disable his healing factor, killing him. He is replaced by a clone by the time the X-Men attack the Marauders' headquarters.

Sabretooth returns to the sewers to kill the remaining Morlocks. Caliban, a surviving Morlock, breaks Sabretooth's back and leaves him for dead. It takes weeks for his healing factor to repair his spine, during which he sustains himself on sewer water and passing vermin. He recovers just in time to confront Wolverine, who encounters him while lost in the sewers.

=== Betrayal of the X-Men and brief alliance with X-Factor ===
Suffering from severe bloodlust, Sabretooth hires telepathic mutant Birdy to subdue him with "the glow", satiating his bloodlust and numbing of his memories. A short time later, Birdy is killed by Sabretooth's grown son Graydon, who now has a hatred for mutants, especially his father. Without Birdy, Sabretooth slips into a murderous killing spree. This culminates in a clash with Maverick, whom Sabretooth defeats. He escapes, claiming only Wolverine can do what needs to be done to Sabretooth.

Sabretooth later attacks Charles Xavier, leader of the X-Men. As Xavier infiltrates Creed's mind, he discovers that every victim Sabretooth has killed is remembered by the villain. Xavier is confident this means Creed values human life, and there is hope for the mutant. Sabretooth is incarcerated, as a wanted murderer, in a holographic environment because Xavier does not want him to roam on the grounds. Sabretooth is angered, but grudgingly stays with the team.

Caliban, free of Apocalypse's control, kidnaps the X-Man Jubilee in exchange for Sabretooth. When Sabretooth arrives, he mauls Caliban's face, and Caliban flees. Wolverine, who had left the team after his adamantium was removed by Magneto, returns, and the villain escapes for a fight. This leads to Wolverine stabbing one of his claws into Sabretooth's brain. Sabretooth's brain injury frees him from the need for "the glow" and makes him resistant to telepathic detection and control. Retaliating, Sabretooth nearly kills Psylocke, but he is finally confronted by the X-Men, who incapacitate him.

He is turned over to the custody of Dr. Valerie Cooper, who fits him with an explosive restraining collar and forces him to participate as a member of the government-sponsored X-Factor team. Creed later admits he was a "sleeper" agent with the mission of executing X-Factor members the government could not control. He eventually escapes and returns once more to mercenary work. Under unknown circumstances he gains adamantium skeleton and claws.

Sabretooth then joins Mystique's new Brotherhood of Mutants, calling itself the Brotherhood, where he participates in an assassination attempt against Senator Robert Kelly.

=== Weapon X and the Brotherhood ===
Later, he is forced to become a member of a relaunched Weapon X program, where his skeleton is infused with adamantium once more. In Wolverine (vol. 2) #166, Sabretooth reveals that by means of genetic enhancement the Weapon X program has increased his strength and accelerated his healing factor. Eventually he escaped the program again and resumed working solo. However, he sometimes worked on a team, such as when he worked with several other villains to locate the Identity Disc, a record of heroes' secret identities. This ended up being a ruse, though Nick Fury had the real disc.

Later, in Canada, he encountered Sasquatch and the newest Wendigo. Sasquatch believes Creed may be responsible for some of the human deaths occurring there. Creed is seen setting traps and acting mysteriously. Sasquatch discovers Sabretooth is playing a twisted mind-game with the Wendigo before attempting to kill it. Sabretooth and the Wendigo fall into the Arctic Sea with Sabretooth biting the Wendigo's neck, and both are presumed dead by Sasquatch. After a fearsome battle in the arctic waters, Sabretooth emerged victorious with the hide of the Wendigo.

=== Reluctant alliance with the X-Men ===
Promotional art for X-Men (vol. 2) #189 (September 2006). Art by Chris Bachalo and Tim Townsend.

In X-Men (vol. 2) #188 (August 2006), Sabretooth was spotted fleeing a mysterious group of superhumans collectively known as the Children of the Vault. Their reasons for pursuing him remained unknown, but two of them—Sangre and Serafina—were tracking him. Sangre activated a singularity generator that annihilated most of the town and killed all its citizens, except for a little girl whom Serafina deliberately shielded from the destruction so there would be a witness to what had happened. He later encountered two more of the Children—Aguja and Fuego. They attacked him and temporarily neutralized his healing factor, but he managed to escape regardless, only to end up at the Xavier Institute later that night seeking sanctuary.

It is revealed that the Children are after Creed because he has seen them and knows who they are, while the public believed the X-Men destroyed the town. It is only when Rogue, the leader of the team, injected Nano-Sentinels into Sabretooth's blood that they take him along with their fight against the Children, a factor that one of the Children exploited. At one point, Cannonball saved his life during the battle. Sabretooth rewards him with some inside information: "The first time you turn your back, you're dead." Following the incident on Providence, Creed escaped the X-Men, but was hurled into the middle of the Pacific Ocean by Cable.

Writer Mike Carey noted he has no plans on redeeming Sabretooth, saying, "I'm not going to try and show a heroic side to Sabretooth's nature; I'm not going to retcon him so that there are reasons for his actions that make him forgivable. The things he's done are not forgivable and he can't be redeemed. I'm not making him into a hero; I'm making him into a team member and there are reasons within the first storyline as to why he ends up fighting alongside the X-Men against another enemy. And there are reasons why it's not so easy to simply shake him off again afterwards. There are things that are going on that will sort of unfold during the first year of my run which explain his being there and explain his being accepted with very, very grave misgivings into the team."

=== Death ===
Sabretooth attacks Wolverine at Silver Fox's cabin in the Canadian wilderness. In the ensuing battle Wolverine cuts off Sabretooth's left arm with the Muramasa Blade. Sabretooth, still in his animalistic state tries to re-attach his arm allowing his healing factor to kick in, but it does not work. Wolverine explains to a bewildered Creed that it is because the sword interrupts the healing factor and that he has to finally kill Sabretooth for what he has done. Managing to regain control and speak between grunts, Sabretooth tells him, "Do it". Wolverine then decapitates Sabretooth, finally putting an end to his long-time enemy. Logan then walks away, leaving both Creed's body and head in the snow to rot.

=== Return ===
It was later revealed that the Sabretooth beheaded by Logan was one of several clones grown by Romulus. The real Sabretooth comes out of hiding and starts a war between rival gangs in Japan. Sabretooth later holds a party with but Wolverine crashes the party and defeats all the guests, he then tells Sabretooth "Happy birthday, from your old pal Wolverine".

Sabretooth trains Kade Kilgore in combat and tactics, with the purpose of attacking the Jean Grey School. Sabretooth tells Kilgore the best way to destroy them is to hit them in the heart, physical or metaphorical. Kilgore figures that the heart of the school is Beast (Henry McCoy). Sabretooth ambushes the latter managing to physically wound him before taking his fight to Abigail Brand, Hank's girlfriend. With help from Beast, Abigail is able to blast Sabretooth away.

Sabretooth appears as a member of Daken's short-lived Brotherhood of Mutants. Then later becomes a headmaster of the Hellfire Academy. While he also works with Mystique to frame the original X-Men for a series of bank thefts.

Sabretooth is among the villains contracted by the Assassins Guild to target Elektra's allies.

=== Inversion ===
During the AXIS storyline, Sabretooth appears as a member of Magneto's unnamed supervillain group during their fight against Red Onslaught. Sabretooth experiences a 'moral inversion' that turns him into a hero when the attempt to bring out the Xavier elements of Onslaught backfire, prompting Steve Rogers to recruit him and the other inverted villains into a new team of 'Astonishing Avengers' to defeat the inverted heroes. As time goes on, Sabretooth's inversion starts to wear off. He admits not being able to keep living the lie his inverted-self has been, but he does not intend to become the monster he was, so he must become something different. He believes he needs something to fight for to stay grounded, and he remembers the promise he made to Monet, whom he developed feelings for.

=== House of X ===
In "House of X and Powers of X", Mystique, Sabretooth, and Toad infiltrate the base of Damage Control searching for information in the databases. While they get what they searched for, Sabretooth maims several guards in the chaos and is eventually captured by the Fantastic Four. While the Fantastic Four are about to take away Sabretooth, Cyclops arrives to bring him back to Krakoa due to diplomatic immunity. While tensions arise between him and Mister Fantastic, Cyclops decides to leave Sabretooth to them to avoid a situation. In the superhuman prison known as Project Achilles, a trial is being held for Sabretooth. The trial is interrupted by Emma Frost who presents the judge with a pardon from the U.S. Supreme Court as the U.S. government has agreed to a general amnesty for all mutants on American soil in anticipation of Krakoa becoming a sovereign nation. Despite the protests of the human officials at the court, Frost and Sabretooth are allowed to walk free and return to Krakoa. The Quiet Council of Krakoa finds Sabretooth guilty of violating the second law and sentences him to exile deep within Krakoa.

Sabretooth meets fellow prisoners mutants Nekra, Madison Jeffries, Oya, Melter, and Third-Eye, to whom he states his intent to expose the secret and inhumane imprisonments on Krakoa to bring public opinion against the Quiet Council. As he is talking, Melter destroys Sabretooth's body in the material plane. The destruction of Sabretooth's body almost kills everyone in the pit because it is controlled by his mind, but Third-Eye saves the other prisoners by dragging them to the astral plane. Sabretooth escapes from the Pit in a boat shortly after a failed attempt by Magma to free them results in everyone in the area being knocked unconscious. Cypher sends the other exiles to find Sabretooth so he can face punishment.

Sabretooth's boat is caught and apprehended by Orchis agents, who take him to Dr. Barrington to be experimented on. After vivisecting Sabretooth, Barrington leaves to deal with the rest of the exiles who had infiltrated her private island. While Barrington is gone, Sabretooth escapes in a boat, offering the rest of the exiles a ride. The team escapes with the freed Orchis prisoners on their boat, which Jeffries transforms into a vessel big enough to contain them all.

=== Sabretooth War ===
After traveling the Multiverse, killing multiversal variants of the X-Men and recruiting "Camo" - a version of Sabretooth from Earth-33441 who can transform himself into others - from his own universe at the start of the "Sabretooth War" storyline, Sabretooth and his other variants - patriotic superhero "Cap" from Earth-203, and Savage Land inhabitant "Savage" from Earth-1912, and bad boy celebrity "Pretty Boy" of Earth-12 - along with their army of headless Sabretooth cyborgs, arrive on Krakoa to his enact revenge on the Quiet Council for Wolverine's birthday only to find the mutant nation empty as Sabretooth was unaware of the events that transpired during the "Fall of X" storyline. Their presence is picked up by Black Tom Cassidy from X-Force's Arctic base and Kid Omega is sent to investigate. Camo disguises himself as Wolverine to trick Kid Omega. With his guard lowered, Camo stabs Kid Omega in the neck while Sabretooth and the others cannibalize his body. Using the telepathic energy from Kid Omega's still alive head, the Sabretooth Army tracks down Wolverine at the arctic base and uses the head's telepathic powers to put Black Tom and Sage in a trance. Sabretooth ambushes Daken - now calling himself Fang and had just began repairing his relationship with Wolverine - and kills him after a vicious duel. Sabretooth spells out "HAPPy bIrThDAy" with pieces of Fang's corpse to taunt Wolverine. Wolverine flies into a berserk rage and attacks but is defeated by the headless Sabretooth cyborgs while Sabretooth continues to taunt him. Sabretooth restrains Wolverine with adamantium tentacles and wanting to prolong Wolverine's suffering, proceeds to massacre many of the inhabitants at the arctic base with his army. Black Tom and Sage are freed from their trace and activate the base's defense mechanisms, forcing Sabretooth to flee with Savage, Camo and the remnants of his army while Pretty Boy and most of the headless Sabretooth cyborgs are killed and Cap is left behind.

Despite this, the remnant army manage to abduct Wolverine's daughter Laura. Back at the station, Sabretooth uses Kid Omega's head to read Wolverine's thoughts. Satisfied that his actions have sent Wolverine into despair, he also discovers a hidden treasure map in Wolverine's memories. Meanwhile, Savage and Camo blame Sabretooth for the deaths of their other counterparts and plot to recover Graydon against him while Kid Omega sends a telepathic message for help to the Exiles. X-Force capture and interrogate Cap for information regarding Sabretooth and his army and manage to uncover some of their history and plans using telepathy until a psionic image of Sabretooth - implanted within Cap's mind as a "failsafe" - attacks Phoebe Cuckoo, forcing Domino to kill Cap to save her. Kid Omega sends another telepathic distress signal from Sabretooth's base to X-Force, to which Wolverine flies to alone on X-Force's Bluebird to confront him. Following the map's coordinates, Sabretooth flies back to Krakoa and discovers with Omega's head that the treasure is buried beneath the island. Meanwhile, the Exiles are driven away by the patrolling Stark Sentinels while Wolverine is able to get past them. Sabretooth and Wolverine pick up on each other's scents and Sabretooth immobilizes Wolverine with a telepathic blast from Omega by having him relive memories of their Team X days.

Believing that they are doing a mission together, Wolverine leads Sabretooth further into Krakoa's depths into Forge's workshop. The Exiles catch up to Sabretooth, who forces Wolverine to help him fight them off. Sabretooth kills Toad while Wolverine kills Melter, whose death snaps Wolverine out of his hypnosis. While Wolverine is briefly stunned by his actions, Sabretooth reveals the "treasure" he needed Wolverine to help him acquire: Forge's Neutralizer, which he promptly shoots and depowers Wolverine with. Despite losing his healing factor, Wolverine puts up a fight against Sabretooth, who resorts to using Omega to generate a psionic gun which he uses to shoot Wolverine in the head with. While Sabretooth contemplates what to do with the barely alive Wolverine, the surviving Exiles catch up to them. Out of revenge for the atrocities Sabretooth forced him to commit, Kid Omega shoots Sabretooth with a psychic blast while Nekra uses the Killing Seed - a mysterious seed previously given to her by Cypher to use against Sabretooth, which rapidly grows into a gigantic carnivorous plant that ensnares and devours Sabretooth. The Exiles take Wolverine's unconscious body with them for medical attention while Kid Omega remains behind to watch Sabretooth's suffering while waiting for X-Force to rescue him.

While trapped within the Killing Seed, Sabretooth is placed under mental fantasy resembling a therapist's office where a projection of Cypher acts as a therapist and forces Sabretooth to mentally experience the deaths of his many victims from their perspectives to help him feel a sense of remorse for his actions. Instead, Sabretooth rejects Cypher's attempts to rehabilitate him and becomes emboldened by the memories of his victims, giving him the strength to break free from the Killing Seed. In Sabretooth's absence, the Sabretooth Army has been decimated, with Laura killing Savage before sending a distress signal to X-Force while Graydon, who converted himself into a cyborg while trapped in an alternate dimension, betrays and kills Camo and the rest of the army. Before Graydon and Wolverine, donning Forge's Adamantium Armor and wielding a Muramasa Blade to compensate for his lost powers, could face off, Sabretooth sneaks up behind Graydon and kills him. With the reunited X-Force and the Exiles converging together on Krakoa's beach, Sabretooth lures Wolverine to the Pit and uses his mental connection to the Pit to drag Wolverine within his depths and uses its vines to strip him of his armor and sword. However, Phoebe severs Sabretooth's connection to Krakoa, causing the Pit to eject Wolverine. Before X-Force or the Exiles could intervene, Wolverine reveals that the Adamantium Armor restored his powers and challenges Sabretooth to a final showdown. After a bloody and vicious battle, Wolverine kills Sabretooth.

== Personality and themes ==
Psychologist Suzana E. Flores notes that while all Marvel villains have antisocial traits, Sabretooth "takes the notion of being antisocial to another level: he IS antisocial personality disorder incarnate." As such, he is manipulative, sadistic, and violent, and unable to attach emotionally to others. While the exact causes of his disorder are unclear, she concludes that this personality type probably cannot be effectively treated or rehabilitated.

== Powers and abilities ==
Sabretooth using his tracking skills to find Wolverine.

Sabretooth is a mutant with a number of both natural and artificial improvements to his physiology compared to normal humans. His primary mutant power is an accelerated healing ability that allows him to regenerate damaged or destroyed areas of his body and cellular structure far beyond the capabilities of an ordinary human. Like Wolverine's, his abilities have been depicted with variable degrees of contradiction by various creators. Sabretooth's increased attributes stem in part from said healing. This "healing factor" also grants him virtual immunity against most poisons, drugs, toxins, and diseases, and limited immunity to fatigue. The regenerative qualities of his powers cause him to age at an unusually slow rate. While he is of an unknown advanced age, Sabretooth has the appearance and vitality of a tall, very burly, highly muscular man in his late 20s to mid 30s.

The depiction of Sabretooth's powers has changed and evolved depending on creative team, with his healing power introduced as a retcon after he became Wolverine's rival. In other, earlier appearances, Sabretooth was much more average. In a fight with Spider-Man, he was incapacitated when his face was severely wounded, and did not display any accelerated healing. When Sabretooth returned, his still prominent wounds were reopened when he was hit in the face.

Sabretooth possesses acute senses that are comparable to certain animals. This includes the ability to see objects with greater clarity and at much greater distances than an ordinary human. He is able to see with this same level of clarity in almost complete darkness, just like a nocturnal hunter. It is also said that he can see infrared and ultraviolet portions of the spectrum.

He possesses some degree of notable physical abilities, such as superhuman strength due to his healing factor. The exact limits of his strength are unknown, though he originally could crush an iron barbell with ease. His physical strength has been artificially enhanced at least twice. The first was a strength enhancement from his son, Graydon. It was then further enhanced after joining the latest incarnation of the Weapon X Program. His healing factor also grants him superhuman stamina, so he can push himself at peak capacity for several days before fatigue sets in. On top of this he is depicted as having retractable claws that can rend normal clothing and flesh with ease.

His agility and reflexes were both naturally above human and further artificially-enhanced. With an ability to pounce like a hunting big cat, stalk and move quietly throughout his appearances, most human and some super powered enemies can not react to his leap before being hit.

=== Skills ===
Sabretooth is a skilled hand-to-hand and armed combatant, having received training from organizations and individuals including the CIA, Department H's Weapon X program, the Foreigner, and Hydra. He is also experienced in hunting and tracking and has developed a resistance to telepathic probing and manipulation following an injury to his brain. Despite this injury, Sabretooth has demonstrated considerable intelligence, particularly through his ability to evade capture and escape high-security incarceration without assistance. He is also capable of psychological manipulation, and speaks fluent German.

== Reception ==
- In 2014, Entertainment Weekly ranked Sabretooth 66th in their "Let's rank every X-Man ever" list.
- In 2018, Comic Book Resources (CBR) ranked Sabretooth 21st in their "Age Of Apocalypse: The 30 Strongest Characters In Marvel's Coolest Alternate World" list.

== Other versions ==
=== 5 Ronin ===
An alternate universe version of Sabretooth appears in 5 Ronin. This version is a masked ronin who was driven insane after being betrayed by the Daimyo's soldier, and the brother of fellow ronin "The Wolverine". After killing the Wolverine, whom inexplicably revives after being buried by Watari the Fool, before re-fighting and mortally wounds him, the Wolverine is heartbroken to learn he has killed his own brother, apologising to him before granting him a mercy decapitation and setting off to find the Daimyo and avenge his brother.

=== Age of Apocalypse ===
In the universe of "Age of Apocalypse", Sabretooth is a former ally of Apocalypse who was cast out as a traitor when he expressed moral reservations about using nuclear weapons to wipe out the world's human population. After escaping prison, Sabretooth ends up adopting Blink and Wild Child. Sabretooth is later rescued from the destruction of his universe and recruited into Weapon X.

=== Age of X ===
- In Age of X, Sabretooth is also known as 'Weapon X' and was used by the Avengers to track down other mutants before being killed by the Hulk.

=== Earth X ===
In Earth X, Sabreooth is a member of the Bear Clan, a group of humans who the Celestials altered into bestial forms.

=== Ultimate Marvel ===
An alternate universe version of Sabretooth appears in the Ultimate Marvel imprint. This version is a soldier and commando for Weapon X under Colonel Wraith. In addition, Sabretooth has adamantium claws and teeth, which were surgically implanted in an attempt to one-up Wolverine after having many failures in the service of Weapon X.

=== Ultimate Universe ===
In Ultimate Wolverine, Sabretooth is part of a resistance against the Rasputin family.

=== X-Men Forever ===
An alternate universe version of Sabretooth appears in X-Men Forever. This version is Wolverine's father. After being injured while attacking the X-Mansion, he loses his sight, healing factor, and one hand. Following Wolverine's death, Sabretooth joins the X-Men to honor Wolverine, using his still-enhanced senses to compensate for his lack of vision, and a bionic replacement for his hand.

Chris Claremont stated in an interview that in X-Men Forever, the original, true Sabretooth makes his reappearance after a long time, and that the Sabretooth seen prior to X-Men Forever #2, which follows directly after X-Men (vol. 2) #3, was a clone created by Mister Sinister. The original Sabretooth reappears dressed in the Jim Lee costume in X-Men Forever, which would make the weaker clone the one dressed in the John Byrne costume. Claremont claims that he always meant for the Sabretooth dressed in the Byrne costume to be later outed as a clone of the original Sabretooth. Claremont has stated: "Speaking specifically of the cast of X-Men Forever, one character who's becoming more enticing is Sabretooth, in part because (at least as it relates to my conception of him) very little is actually known. They then filled his skeleton with adamantium. At this specific point of his life, readers haven't really seen that much of him over the years, since the Sabes that's shown up most over the time is a less-endowed copy cloned from spare cells by Mr. Sinister."

== In other media ==
=== Television ===
- Sabretooth appears in X-Men: The Animated Series, voiced by Don Francks. This version, also known as Graydon Creed Sr., was born in Edmonton, Alberta.
  - Sabretooth appears in the X-Men '97 episode "Weapon X, Lies, and DVDs", voiced by Darin De Paul.
- Sabretooth appears in X-Men: Evolution, voiced by Michael Donovan. This version is a member of Magneto's Acolytes. Sabretooth leaves following Magneto's apparent death and the Acolytes' disbandment.
- Sabretooth appears in Wolverine and the X-Men, voiced by Peter Lurie. This version is a member of Weapon X who was previously partnered with Wolverine until the latter refused to harm an innocent and attacked him instead.
- Sabretooth appears in The Super Hero Squad Show, voiced by Charlie Adler. This version is a member of Doctor Doom's Lethal Legion.
- Sabretooth appears in the Ultimate Spider-Man episode "Freaky", voiced again by Peter Lurie.
- Sabretooth appears in Marvel Disk Wars: The Avengers, voiced by Takuya Kirimoto in the Japanese version and again by Peter Lurie in the English version.
- Sabretooth appears in Lego Marvel Avengers: Strange Tails, voiced by Trevor Devall.

=== Film ===
- Sabretooth appears in X-Men (2000), portrayed by Tyler Mane. This version is a member of Magneto's Brotherhood of Mutants. While helping the Brotherhood in their plot to turn humans into mutants and fending off the X-Men at the Statue of Liberty, Sabretooth fights Wolverine until he is defeated by Cyclops.
- Sabretooth appears in Hulk vs. Wolverine, voiced by Mark Acheson. This version is a member of Team X.
- Victor Creed appears in X-Men Origins: Wolverine, portrayed by Liev Schreiber as an adult and Michael-James Olsen as a child. This version is Wolverine's half-brother via their father Thomas Logan. While fighting in the American Civil War, World War I, World War II, and the Vietnam War and serving in William Stryker's Team X together, Creed grows increasingly bloodthirsty and arrogant, which contributes to Wolverine leaving Team X. Despite this, Creed stays with Stryker, helping him capture and/or kill mutants to experiment on and manipulate Wolverine until Stryker denies him the chance to have adamantium bonded to his skeleton. Despite their animosity, Creed and Wolverine join forces to defeat Weapon XI before re-parting ways.
- Sabretooth was originally meant to appear in Logan, but was removed from the final screenplay.
- An alternate version of Sabretooth appears in Deadpool & Wolverine, portrayed again by Tyler Mane. This Sabretooth was sent to the Void by the Time Variance Authority and became an enforcer for Cassandra Nova.

=== Video games ===
- Sabretooth appears as the final boss of Wolverine.
- Sabretooth appears as a playable character in X-Men vs. Street Fighter, voiced by Don Francks.
- Sabretooth appears as a playable character in Marvel vs. Capcom 2: New Age of Heroes, voiced again by Don Francks.
- Sabretooth appears as a playable character in X-Men: Mutant Academy, voiced again by Don Francks. This version is a member of the Brotherhood of Mutants.
- Sabretooth appears as a playable character in X-Men: Mutant Academy 2, voiced again by Don Francks. This version is a member of the Brotherhood of Mutants.
- Sabretooth appears as a playable character in X-Men: Next Dimension, voiced by Fred Tatasciore. This version is a member of the Brotherhood of Mutants.
- Sabretooth appears as a boss in X2: Wolverine's Revenge, voiced again by Fred Tatasciore.
- Sabretooth appears as a boss in X-Men Legends, voiced by Peter Lurie. This version is a member of the Brotherhood of Mutants.
- An amalgamated incarnation of Sabretooth appears as a playable character in the PC version of X-Men Legends II: Rise of Apocalypse, voiced again by Peter Lurie. This version is a member of the Brotherhood of Mutants who resembles the Ultimate Marvel incarnation coupled with the mainstream incarnation's personality and history. Additionally, similarly to the Age of Apocalypse and Exiles incarnations, he serves as a father figure to Blink.
- Sabretooth appears as a boss in X-Men: The Official Game, voiced by Tyler Mane.
- Sabretooth appears as a downloadable playable character in the Xbox 360 version of Marvel: Ultimate Alliance, voiced again by Peter Lurie. He was made available through the "Villain Pack" DLC. Additionally, his Age of Apocalypse, Ultimate Marvel, and original comics designs appear as alternate skins.
- Sabretooth appears in the X-Men Origins: Wolverine tie-in game, voiced by Liev Schreiber.
- Sabretooth appears in Marvel Super Hero Squad, voiced again by Charlie Adler.
- Sabretooth appears in Marvel Super Hero Squad Online.
- Sabretooth appears in the Nintendo DS version of X-Men: Destiny.
- The Marvel Zombies incarnation of Sabretooth makes a cameo appearance in Frank West's ending in Ultimate Marvel vs Capcom 3.
- Sabretooth appears as a boss and playable character in Marvel Avengers Alliance. This version is a member of the Brotherhood of Mutants.
- Sabretooth appears in LittleBigPlanet as part of the "Marvel Costume Kit 6" DLC.
- Sabretooth appears in Marvel Heroes, voiced by Neil Kaplan.
- Sabretooth appears as a boss and playable character in Lego Marvel Super Heroes, voiced by Travis Willingham. This version is a member of the Brotherhood of Mutants.
- Sabretooth appears as a playable character in Marvel Contest of Champions.
- Sabretooth appears as a playable character in Marvel Puzzle Quest.
- Sabretooth appears as a playable character in Marvel Strike Force. This version is a member of the Brotherhood of Mutants and the Marauders.
- Sabretooth appears in Marvel's Midnight Suns, voiced again by Peter Lurie.
- Sabretooth appears as a boss in Marvel's Wolverine, voiced by Brett Gipson. This version is a member of Team X who initially shares a close bond with Wolverine and resents him following the latter's departure from the team. When Team X's leader, Nathaniel Essex, begins capturing mutants for his experiments, Sabretooth sides with him and has his powers enhanced via a Helix Engine. After fighting and losing to Wolverine, he escapes and later joins Apocalypse as one of his Horsemen.

=== Books ===
- Sabretooth appears as a holodeck simulation in Planet X.
- Sabretooth appears in the novelization and comic book prequel tie-in for X2, in which it is revealed he survived being blasted by Cyclops, was the subject of an international manhunt, and had a brief confrontation with Logan to talk about their shared history.

=== Miscellaneous ===
- Sabretooth appears in The Amazing Spider-Man. This version is Wolverine's brother.
- Sabretooth appears in the Wolverine versus Sabretooth motion comic, voiced by Ron Halder.

== Collected editions ==
Title	Material collected	Published date	ISBN
Wolverine Epic Collection: Inner Fury	Sabretooth (vol. 1) #1–4 and Wolverine (vol. 2) #69–75, Wolverine: Inner Fury #1, Wolverine: Killing #1, Wolverine: Global Jeopardy #1, X-Men (vol. 2) #25	March 2020	978-1302923907
Sabretooth: Open Season	Sabretooth (vol. 3) #1–4	March 2005	978-0785115076
Wolverine by Daniel Way: The Complete Collection	Wolverine (1988) #187–189, Wolverine (2003) #33–40, Wolverine: Origins #1–5 and #1 Director's Cut, Sabretooth: Open Season (2004) #1–4, and Material From I (Heart) Marvel: My Mutant Heart #1	January 2017	978-1302904722
X-Men Origins: The Complete Collection	X-Men Origins: Sabretooth and X-Men Origins: Colossus, Jean Grey, Beast, Wolverine, Gambit, Cyclops, Nightcrawler, Iceman, Emma Frost, Deadpool	August 2018	978-1302912208
Sabretooth: The Adversary	Sabretooth (vol. 4) #1–5	October 2022	978-1302931452
