= Mister Sinister =

Marvel Comics supervillain

Dr. Nathaniel Essex Mister Sinister
- Mister Sinister as depicted in variant cover of Powers of X #5 (November 2019). Art by R.B. Silva and Marte Gracia.

Publication information
- Publisher: Marvel Comics
- First appearance: First mentioned: The Uncanny X-Men #212 (1986); First seen in silhouette: The Uncanny X-Men #213 (1987); First full appearance: The Uncanny X-Men #221 (1987)
- Created by: Chris Claremont

In-story information
- Alter ego: Dr. Nathaniel Essex
- Species: Human mutate
- Team affiliations: Marauders; Nasty Boys; Intelligencia; Quiet Council of Krakoa; Hellions
- Partnerships: Apocalypse
- Notable aliases: Nathan Milbury, Robert Windsor, Mike Milbury, Nosferatu, Sinister
- Abilities: Molecular manipulation; Shapeshifting; Regenerative healing factor; Longevity; Enhanced durability; Superhuman strength; Telepathy; Telekinesis; Energy projection; Expert genetic engineer and surgeon; Cloning expert; Precognition

Mister Sinister is a supervillain appearing in American comic books published by Marvel Comics. Created by artist Marc Silvestri and writer Chris Claremont, the character was first mentioned as the employer of the Marauders in The Uncanny X-Men #212 (cover dated December 1986), and made his first full appearance in The Uncanny X-Men #221 (September 1987).

Mister Sinister is the persona of Dr. Nathaniel Essex, a London biologist in the 19th century. Inspired by the work of his contemporary Charles Darwin, he becomes obsessed with eugenics and engineering humanity into a perfect race of superhumans. Following the death of his infant son and his wife Rebecca, Essex allies himself with Apocalypse, who uses Celestial technology to transform him into an ageless man with superpowers. Sinister develops a great interest towards the mutant heroes Cyclops and Jean Grey, believing their DNA can create the ultimate mutant. Later, the Krakoan Age storyline revealed that the original Mister Sinister was one of several clones of the original Nathaniel Essex; these other clones consist of Doctor Stasis, Orbis Stellaris, and Mother Righteous.

Major Mister Sinister stories include "Mutant Massacre" (1986) and "Inferno" (1989). Other major storylines involving the character include "X-Cutioner's Song" (1992–1993), in which he releases the Legacy Virus, and the alternate "Age of Apocalypse" reality, in which he serves as one of Apocalypse's chief lieutenants. One of his largest arcs saw him join the ruling Quiet Council of the mutant nation Krakoa, before secretly betraying it by inserting his own genetic code into its population during "Sins of Sinister" (2023). While his primary antagonists are Cyclops, Jean Grey, and the X-Men, Sinister has also come into conflict with Spider-Man, Wolverine, and Deadpool.

Making frequent appearances in the X-Men comics and related spin-off titles, Mister Sinister has also featured in associated Marvel merchandise, including animated television series, toys, trading cards, and video games. IGN's list of the "Top 100 Comic Book Villains of All Time" ranked Sinister as #29. The character was exposed to a wider audience with his television debut on X-Men: The Animated Series, voiced by Christopher Britton, as well as an appearance in Wolverine and the X-Men, voiced by Clancy Brown. Mister Sinister will make his live action cinematic debut in the untitled X-Men film (2028), set in the Marvel Cinematic Universe, portrayed by Adam Driver.

== Publication history ==
Writer Chris Claremont conceived Sinister as a new villain for the X-Men. Having felt "tired of just going back to Magneto and the Brotherhood of Evil Mutants and the same old same old" Claremont recalled:

Dave Cockrum and I went over ideas, and what we were coming towards was a mysterious young boy—apparently an 11-year-old—at the orphanage where Scott (Cyclops) was raised, who turned out to be the secret master of the place. In effect what we were setting up was a guy who was aging over a lifespan of roughly a thousand years. Even though he looked like an 11-year-old, he'd actually been alive since the mid-century at this point—he was actually about 50 [...] He had all the grown-up urges. He's growing up in his mind but his body isn't capable of handling it, which makes him quite cranky. And, of course, looking like an 11-year-old, who'd take him seriously in the criminal community? [...] So he built himself an agent in a sense, which was Mister Sinister, that was, in effect, the rationale behind Sinister's rather—for want of a better word—childish or kid-like appearance. The costume... the look... the face... it's what would scare a child. Even when he was designed, he wasn't what you'd expect in a guy like that.

Mister Sinister was first mentioned by the assassin Sabretooth as the employer behind the team of assassins known as the Marauders in The Uncanny X-Men #212 (December 1986), which was part of the 1986 "Mutant Massacre" storyline, in which Sinister ordered the Marauders to kill the Morlocks living beneath New York City. In the next issue, drawn by Alan Davis, Sinister is first glimpsed as a generic silhouette when the telepathic X-Man Psylocke scans Sabretooth's mind. Mister Sinister appeared unobscured for the first time on the opening splash page of issue #221 (September 1987), drawn by Marc Silvestri. The character is one of the major antagonists in the 1989 "Inferno" storyline, where it is revealed he created the character Madelyne Pryor, estranged wife of Scott Summers (the mutant hero Cyclops), by cloning Scott's former lover Jean Grey, who was believed dead at the time. Sinister sent Pryor into Scott's life in the hopes that the combined DNA of Grey and Summers would result in the birth of a powerful mutant. Soon after "Inferno", Sinister is also revealed to have manipulated Cyclops' life since early childhood and who at times has influenced his behavior from afar. After a battle with the X-Men and X-Factor, the villain is apparently destroyed by Cyclops' optic beam, leaving behind only bones.

Months after his apparent death, backup stories by Claremont published in the reprint series Classic X-Men #41–42 (December 1989) detailed the role Mister Sinister played in Cyclops' early life at an orphanage in Nebraska. The stories feature a boy named Nate who is roommates with the young Scott Summers. Despite Scott saying he does not particularly like Nate, the boy appears to be unhealthily attached to him and is aggressively protective, blocking Scott from having other friends. Claremont intended Nate to actually be Mister Sinister, revealing this was his true form and the armored villain was an illusion he used to threaten others. However, Claremont left the X-Men comics before this origin was revealed to readers. Fans later considered "Nate" to be Sinister in disguise as a boy, whereas his adult, armored appearance was his true form. The 2009 series X-Men Forever (vol. 2) showed an alternate timeline, beginning at roughly the same point where Chris Claremont left as head writer of the X-Men years before. Written by Claremont, the series revealed how he would have continued the stories and what revelations he would have made about different characters. The 2010 sequel series, X-Men Forever 2 features Mister Sinister as a character who is over a century old yet still physically an adolescent boy, using a robot to act as a proxy.

Despite his apparent death in the "Inferno" storyline, Sinister appeared again in X-Factor in 1992, now leader of the Nasty Boys team and displaying the ability to regenerate from damage. He played a major role in the 1992-1993 crossover storyline "X-Cutioner's Song", unwittingly helping to unleash the Legacy Virus on the world. In X-Men (vol. 2) #22-23 (1993), Sinister reveals his seeming death was a "ruse" so he could retreat rather than fight the combined X-Men and X-Factor teams. The same story depicts Sinister willing to protect Cyclops from other villains.

By 1994, Mister Sinister was popular enough that Chef Boyardee used him to advertise its pasta. In X-Men (vol. 2) Annual 1995, flashbacks reveal Sinister living in Los Angeles in the 1930s as "Nathan Essex" and depict him as an adult man during that era. In the 1996 limited series The Further Adventures of Cyclops and Phoenix, writer Peter Milligan (with artists John Paul Leon and Klaus Janson) establishes Sinister's origin, revealing he was originally a Victorian-era scientist named Nathaniel Essex who later gained superhuman powers from Apocalypse, thus abandoning Claremont's idea that he was an immortal trapped in the form of a child.

The 2006 mini-series X-Men: Colossus Bloodline revealed that Sinister's powers were weakening and he hoped to restore them. Before he can restore his full power, Sinister is killed in New X-Men (vol. 2) #46 (2008). The same year, a contingency plan in X-Men: Legacy #214-215 involves him attempting to take a new host body, but fails. In X-23 (vol. 3) #5-6 (2011), another resurrection contingency plan led to the creation of Miss Sinister and to Mister Sinister's mind inhabiting a clone body of himself. In The Uncanny X-Men #544 (2011), it is revealed that Sinister is now an entire colony of Sinister clones co-existing, each with minor differences. In subsequent battles, the leader Sinister and other clones were killed, only to be replaced by new clones with the same consciousness and improved genetics. The community of Sinister clones is destroyed in The Uncanny X-Men (vol. 2) #16 (2012). In issue #17 (2012), reveals that one copy of Sinister's mind survived, however, planting himself in the mind of X-Men public relations manager Kate Kildare. The surviving Sinister mind kills her and creates a new clone body to inhabit.

In the 2019 mini-series Powers of X, it is revealed that several years before the present-day, one of the clones Sinister created possessed an X-gene, making him a mutant like the X-Men. This mutant Sinister assumed leadership of the community of Sinister clones and seems to be the surviving version who operates today. The same mini-series involved Sinister joining the new mutant community of the island Krakoa, and joining its ruling Quiet Council alongside Magneto, Professor X, Apocalypse, and others.

The 2023 series Immortal X-Men established that the original Nathaniel Essex was murdered by Sherlock Holmes / Mystique in 1895. Before his death he created four clones to research paths to Machine Dominionhood independent of one another, whom Mystique's wife Destiny (Irene Adler) ensured would survive to adulthood. The clone branded with (♦️) continued to operate as Minister Sinister, while two others, branded with (♣️) and (♠️) respectively, became Doctor Stasis who researched various ways to post-Humanity and Orbis Stellaris who abandoned Earth and ventured into space to research alien technologies. The fourth clone with the (♥️) was of his late wife Rebecca who became a magical user called Mother Righteous. The male clones were unaware of one another for a long time, and each believed themselves to be the original Nathaniel, with no memory of dying and being cloned. In different possible futures, each had eventually succeeded in ascending to categorical godhood as a Dominion, only to be blocked and had their progress harvested by the A.I. imprint of the original Essex, who thus retroactively brought itself into existence as Enigma, a universal-level godlike intelligence existing outside space and time.

== Fictional character biography ==
=== 19th century ===
Born in Milbury House in Victorian-era London, Nathaniel Essex is the son of Admiral Erasmus Essex and Mary Essex. Earning a full scholarship to the University of Oxford, Essex graduates in 1859, takes up work as a biologist, and marries a woman named Rebecca. A contemporary of Charles Darwin, Essex becomes highly interested in research regarding evolution and "survival of the fittest." He concludes humanity is undergoing increasing mutation due to what he calls "Essex factors" in the human genome. The death of his four-year old son Adam from birth defects hardens his conviction. Arguing that science is beyond morality, his questionable research methods and ideas lead to suspicion, mockery, and finally ousting from the Royal Society and the scientific community. Angry and bitter, Essex accepts that being a "monster" in the eyes of others may be necessary to achieve his goals.

En Sabah Nur offers Essex an alliance, believing they have similar goals in perfecting the world and humanity. Following Rebecca's death, Essex swears his life to Nur, becoming Nur's first "prelate". Apocalypse uses his technology to genetically transform Essex, turning him into an ageless being with chalk-white skin and a form of telekinesis. En Sabah Nur tells the transformed scientist to shed his past identity and choose another, and Essex renames himself "Sinister".

=== Jean Grey and Scott Summers ===
Returning to America, Sinister creates an orphanage to monitor some of the children of families he first observed during Project: Black Womb. Becoming aware of Jean Grey's power, Sinister plans to kill her parents and bring her to the orphanage, only to learn the Greys have already contacted Charles Xavier for help. Not wishing to be detected by Xavier, Sinister decides to keep his distance after acquiring a DNA sample from Jean.

Sinister tracks down Scott Summers and his younger brother Alex, both of whom survived an airplane explosion that seemingly killed their parents. Sinister allows Alex to be adopted by people he can easily monitor, then spends the next year conducting experiments on Scott.

As part of his long-term plan, Sinister allows Scott to be adopted by Jack Winters, who abuses him and forces him to help with crimes. Rather than bend to Winters, Scott resists and is discovered by Xavier and Fred Duncan. With Duncan's help, Scott becomes Xavier's ward and the first official recruit of the original X-Men, with Jean Grey joining weeks later.

Sinister concludes that offspring of Jean Grey and Scott Summers could represent the ultimate stage of mutant potential, possibly a mutant capable of destroying Apocalypse. Using Jean Grey's cell sample, Sinister creates a clone named Madelyne Pryor, giving her false memories and arranging for her to work alongside Scott Summers's grandfather in Alaska.

=== "Mutant Massacre" and "Inferno" ===
Studying the sewer-dwelling community known as the Morlocks, Sinister decides these mutants should not be allowed the chance to mix with the gene pool of other mutants and humans. His studies also reveal that several Morlocks bear signs of genetic manipulation based on his own research (due to Dark Beast's experiments).

Gambit leads the group to the Morlocks, but abandons the group when he learns they intend murder. The Marauders dismiss Gambit and begin their slaughter. Scanning the mind of Sabretooth, Psylocke learns the massacre was ordered by Sinister, alerting the X-Men to his presence for the first time.

Sinister reforms his Marauders, even resurrecting the fallen ones through his now perfected cloning technology. He then confronts Madelyne Pryor and reveals her true origins. Pryor dies and her life-force and memories merge with Jean Grey's. As the X-Factor and X-Men teams fight Sinister, Sinister reveals his many manipulations of Scott Summers over the years, how he mentally influenced Scott to abandon his family, and his quest to create offspring from his and Jean's DNA. Sinister apparently kills Sinister, leaving only charred bones. The battle over, Scott and Jean decide to raise their baby Nathan together. In truth, Sinister is alive, having decided to fake his death so he can retreat rather than continue to battle both X-Factor and the X-Men single-handedly.

=== 1990s ===
Sinister recruits a new team of agents called the Nasty Boys and allies with Stryfe. During this time, he establishes a new cover identity as "Mike Milbury", a neighbor to Scott Summers' grandparents. During the storyline "X-Cutioner's Song", Stryfe gives Sinister a canister he claims contains a sample of his own genetic material, in exchange for a service. When Sinister opens the container, he is angered to find it seemingly empty. He later realizes that he unknowingly unleashed the Legacy Virus, a pathogen engineered by Stryfe that targets mutants. Not long afterward, Scott Summers meets Mike Milbury, who then reveals himself to be Sinister. Sinister warns of the Legacy Virus and also hints that there is a third Summers brother unknown to either Scott or Alex. When the villainous Dark Riders arrive to attack Cyclops, Sinister declares Cyclops to be under his protection.

In the alternative universe of "Age of Apocalypse", Sinister adopts Alex and Scott Summers as his personal soldiers and recruits Hank McCoy (Dark Beast) as his lab assistant. Believing Apocalypse will destroy Earth in his quest to eliminate the weak, Sinister works to create a living weapon against him using DNA from Scott Summers and Jean Grey, creating Nate Grey.

=== 2000s ===
Sinister influences the High Evolutionary to remove the powers of all mutants on Earth, causing widespread injury and several deaths, including most of the community of evolved mutants known as the Neo. Sinister then reveals his true nature and takes over the High Evolutionary's satellite, intending to use it to alter the genetics of people at his discretion, making Earth a giant lab where he could create the ultimate race of superhumans. Sinister's plan is stopped by the X-Men, who restore mutant powers to all of those with the X-gene.

=== 2010s ===
Sinister merges with the Dreaming Celestial, gaining great power. Sinister turns San Francisco's residents into doppelgangers of himself and attempts to create a society resembling 19th-century England, which he claims to now see as a perfect culture. His true plan is to gain the attention of the alien Celestials so they might deem humanity too chaotic and then eradicate the species, leaving him to rebuild the planet with a better version of humanity. The X-Men restore San Francisco and defeat Sinister, who loses his enhanced power.

=== The Quiet Council ===
In the 2019 Powers of X series, it is revealed that at some point in the past, Sinister created his first clone community on an island in the South Pacific, calling it Bar Sinister. While here, he is approached by Professor Xavier and Magneto regarding his collection of DNA samples. Xavier asks Sinister to prioritize cataloging mutant DNA to create a comprehensive database that would be safe, secure, and redundant. In exchange, he offers to provide samples Sinister would have trouble getting on his own. The lead Mister Sinister clone is not interested in the deal, but is suddenly killed by another Sinister clone who has a functional X-gene, making him a mutant. This version of Sinister goes on to join the Quiet Council of Krakoa, the ruling body of Krakoa.

=== Untold story in 1895 ===
Immortal X-Men #8 (January 2023), which opens in 1895 London, revealed that the powers that Apocalypse gave Essex were slowly deteriorating and killing him, and to survive he needed to feast upon the flesh of innocent people who he killed, prompting two long-lived mutants, Mystique (Sherlock Holmes/Raven Darkhölme) and Destiny (Irene Adler) to confront and imprison him. Essex told the two women that Apocalypse did grant him the power to see the future, including major developments in the 20th and 21st centuries such as the escalation of the scale of war and the rise of the machines as the dominant beings on the planet. After Mystique secretly kills Essex, Adler finds four human-sized tanks, each one marked with one of the four suits found on playing cards, smashed open and empty. One of the clones contained in the tanks was a clone of Essex, who became Mister Sinister and continued the original's interest in mutants.

=== Fall of X and the Enigma Dominion ===
Xavier and Sinister discover that Essex's clones were all created to absorb data, leading to the birth of a fifth "child" of Essex: an "apex AI" called Enigma, the same force revealed that stands above all creation, and is coming to end Eternity, the personification of the multiverse.

Years prior, Essex decided the only way to defeat the coming machine supremacy was to join them, creating Enigma in response. Enigma - using a Crown symbol similar to a card deck's King - reaches Dominion outside time and space, but fails to ascend to godhood.

== Powers and abilities ==
Mister Sinister is a genius-level intellect, an expert in genetic manipulation, and a skilled surgeon. Through genetic engineering originally bestowed by Apocalypse—and later refined through his own advanced cloning techniques—Sinister achieved functional immortality. By the late twentieth century, he began transferring his mind into cloned bodies of his own creation. Because cellular imperfections caused slight variations in biology and personality, at least one clone naturally developed an X-Gene. This mutant variant became the leader of the clone community in the 2019 Powers of X miniseries and has acted as the primary Sinister ever since.

He frequently augments his biology with the DNA of other mutants to acquire new powers:

- Cellular Control & Shapeshifting: By implanting Courier's X-Gene, Sinister gained complete molecular control over his body. This grants him accelerated healing, extended longevity, enhanced durability, and the ability to shapeshift between humanoid and amorphous forms.
- Superhuman Conditioning: He integrated a sample of Thunderbird's X-Gene to elevate his physical strength and attributes to superhuman levels.
- Psionics: He possesses formidable telepathic and telekinetic abilities.
- Precognition: As revealed in Immortal X-Men #8, the original Sinister temporarily acquired precognitive powers, allowing him to foresee major 20th-century developments like the escalation of global warfare. However, the strain of these powers was slowly killing him.

While Sinister has occasionally demonstrated the ability to teleport, this is not an inherent genetic power. It is a technological effect generated by his tesseract headquarters.

== Clones of Mister Sinister ==
Nathaniel Essex cloned himself, and members of his original family, many times. In addition to countless Mister Sinister variations are several unique clones.

=== Doctor Stasis ===
Doctor Stasis is a clone of Mister Sinister with a suit of clubs on his forehead who dedicated his life to unlocking the full potential of humans rather than mutants. Flashbacks reveal that he was involved in experiments leading to the origins of Captain America, Hulk and Spider-Man, among others. Like Sinister, Stasis heavily employs clones, using animal chimeras as servants and having dinners with disposable clones of his late wife and sons.

In the present day, he became the director of the Orchis Petal of Human Resources. As a precaution to protect himself from psychic attacks, Stasis wears a full mask over his head.

=== Orbis Stellaris ===
Orbis Stellaris is a clone of Mister Sinister with a suit of spades on his forehead who became an intergalactic arms dealer and used alien technology to prolong his life. He took over the World Farm and later clashed with S.W.O.R.D.

=== Mother Righteous ===
Unlike the previously mentioned entities, Mother Righteous is not a clone of Essex himself, but of his deceased wife Rebecca. She is a skilled mage, collector of magical artefacts, and a vicious dealer for other sorcerers.

=== Enigma ===
First mentioned as a force that stands above all creation and a serious threat to the Marvel Universe which forced the Beyonders to orchestrate the destruction of the Seventh Cosmos through the Molecule Man and the Incursions. A glimpse of the Enigma was first seen by Loki after he survived the destruction of the Seventh Cosmos, and before he landed in Taaia's Sixth Cosmos. The God of Stories describes it as the Crown Above All Things, a menace from beyond the threshold of time, beyond the multiverse itself. Enigma is actually Nathanial Essex's 5th "child", an "apex AI" which used the other four Nathaniel Essex clones to achieve Dominion.

== Reception ==
- In 2017, WhatCulture ranked Mister Sinister 4th in their "10 Most Evil X-Men Villains" list.
- In 2018, CBR.com ranked Mister Sinister 4th in their "20 Most Powerful Mutants From The '80s" list.

Sara Century of Collider expressed interest in seeing Mister Sinister in the X-Men '97 series.

== In other media ==
=== Television ===
- Nathaniel Essex / Mister Sinister appears in X-Men: The Animated Series, voiced by Christopher Britton. This version mutated himself amidst his research to save his ailing wife, culminating in his obsession with Cyclops and Jean Grey.
  - Mister Sinister appears in the first season of X-Men '97, voiced again by Christopher Britton.
- Mister Sinister appears in Wolverine and the X-Men, voiced by Clancy Brown. This version was born a mutant, is obsessed with creating and weaponizing the "ultimate mutant", and leads the Marauders in collecting mutant DNA.
- Mister Sinister appears in the M.O.D.O.K. episode "If Saturday Be... For the Boys!", voiced by Kevin Michael Richardson.

=== Film ===
- In 2018, it was reported that Mister Sinister was initially set to appear in the post-credits scene of The New Mutants (2020), played by Jon Hamm. Josh Boone, director and co-writer of The New Mutants, would later clarify that while Hamm had been approached, no scene featuring him as Sinister was filmed. According to Boone, Fox requested during production that the post-credits scene be changed, stating that the film could not feature Sinister. Later reports confirmed that Sinister was meant to appear in the unproduced Gambit film starring Channing Tatum.
- Sinister will appear in the untitled X-Men film (2028) set in the Marvel Cinematic Universe (MCU), portrayed by Adam Driver. In this version, Sinister uses the name Nathaniel Milbury.

=== Video games ===
- Mister Sinister appears in X2: Wolverine's Revenge, voiced by Christopher Corey Smith.
- Mister Sinister appears as a boss in X-Men Legends II: Rise of Apocalypse, voiced by Daniel Riordan. This version directly serves Apocalypse and experiments on Genoshan prisoners on his behalf.
- Mister Sinister appears as a boss in Marvel Heroes, voiced by Steve Blum.
- Mister Sinister appears as the final boss of Deadpool, voiced by Keith Ferguson. This version is the leader of the Marauders. After killing several clones impersonating Sinister, Deadpool crushes the real Sinister to death with the foot of a Sentinel.
- Mister Sinister appears as a boss in Marvel Avengers Alliance.
- Mister Sinister appears as a playable character in Marvel Contest of Champions.
- Mister Sinister appears as a playable character in Marvel: Future Fight.
- Mister Sinister appears as a playable character in Marvel Puzzle Quest.
- Mister Sinister appears as a playable character in Marvel Strike Force. This version is a member of the Marauders.
- Mister Sinister appears in Marvel Snap.
- Nathaniel Essex appears as the final boss of Marvel's Wolverine, voiced by Troy Baker. This version is the founder of the Essex Institute and the leader of Team X, a black ops group ostensibly dedicated to finding and helping displaced mutants. Furthermore, his powers originate from self-experimentation with mutant genes, and he was responsible for erasing Wolverine's memories in order to recruit him to Team X. After killing Bolivar Trask and acquiring a Helix Engine, which can be used to evolve mutant powers, Essex becomes obsessed with using it to hyper-evolve mutants, believing they are the next stage of human evolution, and increasing his own powers. He reprograms Trask's Sentinels to find and capture dormant mutants for his experiments until he is stopped by Wolverine and Jean Grey and killed by the former.
