= Mutant Massacre =

1986 Marvel Comics storyline

- Cover of X-Men Mutant Massacre (2001), trade paperback collected edition, art by Terry Dodson
- Publisher: Marvel Comics
- Publication date: October – December 1986
- Genre: Superhero; Crossover
Title(s)
New Mutants #46
Power Pack #27
Thor #373-374
The Uncanny X-Men #210-213
X-Factor #9-11
Daredevil #238
- Main character(s): X-Men; X-Factor; Thor; New Mutants; Power Pack; Marauders

Creative team
- Writer(s): Chris Claremont; Louise Simonson; Walter Simonson
- Penciller(s): John Romita Jr. Walter Simonson; Sal Buscema
- Inker(s): Dan Green; Bob Wiacek; Sal Buscema
- Letterer(s): Tom Orzechowski; Joe Rosen; John E. Workman Jr.
- Colorist(s): Glynis Oliver; Petra Scotese; Christie Scheele
- Mutant Massacre: ISBN 0-7851-0224-8

"Mutant Massacre" was a 1986 Marvel Comics crossover storyline. It primarily involved the superhero teams the X-Men and X-Factor. The solo hero Thor, the New Mutants, Power Pack, and Daredevil crossed over for an issue each in their own comic books.

The crossover was a surprise success, yielding sales boosts to the mutant-based books and prompting Marvel Comics' long-running policy of holding such mutant crossovers annually.

The story depicts a massacre of the Morlocks through attacks by the Marauders. The X-Men, X-Factor, and Power Pack attempt to intervene, with the X-Men having three of their members severely injured in the conflict. Annalee and Piper were the only established characters among the casualties of the Morlocks; the others were created solely to be victims of the massacre. This aspect of the story was satirized in What The--?! #4.

== Plot ==
The Marauders attack a mutant named Tommy and her boyfriend for the purpose of following her back to New York and tracking down the Morlocks. The Marauders kill Tommy and hundreds of Morlocks before the X-Men and X-Factor teams arrive separately and fight them, avoiding the total slaughter of the Morlocks. X-Factor's Angel is crucified by the Marauders, while the X-Men's Colossus, Shadowcat, and Nightcrawler are all severely wounded. X-Factor's casualties are lessened by the arrival of Power Pack and Thor, who help save Angel and the rest of X-Factor from suffering any additional harm.

Thor uses his powers to cleanse the dead from the Morlock tunnels with fire, which causes problems for the X-Men, who briefly believe that the firestorm was caused by the Marauders and that the New Mutants died in the fire. Several Morlocks, including Berzerker and Masque, make their way to the surface world.

Wolverine saves the Power Pack and Healer from the Marauder Sabretooth. After their clash, Sabretooth follows Logan home to the X-Mansion. He destroys Cerebro, but is kept from hurting the other Morlocks when Psylocke engages Sabretooth in battle, gleaning information about the Marauders from Sabretooth's mind.

=== Reading order ===
This flow chart, published in select installments of "Mutant Massacre", maps out the story's chronology. The artist is Walt Simonson.

Uncanny X-Men

- Uncanny X-Men #210 (prologue)
- Uncanny X-Men #211
- New Mutants #46
- Uncanny X-Men #212
- Uncanny X-Men #213

X-Factor

- X-Factor #9 (prologue)
- X-Factor #10
- Thor #373
- Power Pack #27
- Thor #374
- X-Factor #11

Daredevil
Daredevil #238 is set after the events of the Mutant Massacre. The issue features Daredevil fighting Sabretooth after his escape from the X-Mansion.

=== Aftermath ===
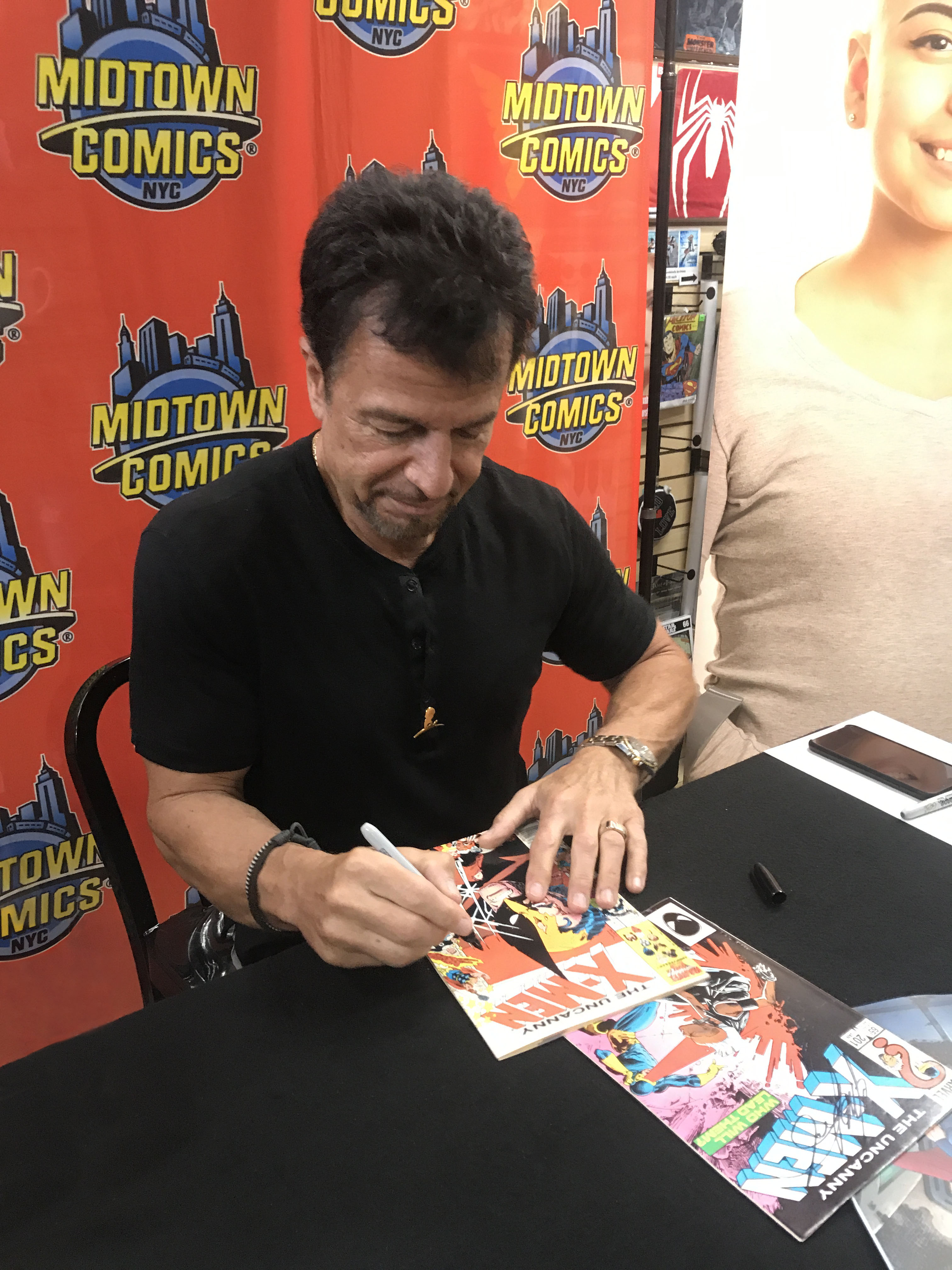
Artist John Romita Jr. signing a copy of The Uncanny X-Men #211 at Midtown Comics in Manhattan

- Angel's injuries sustained during the Massacre lead to his wings being amputated under orders from Cameron Hodge. Angel is given metallic wings by Apocalypse, who transforms him into his Horseman of Death.
- Apocalypse saves Plague from the Massacre and recruits her as the Horseman of Pestilence.
- Colossus is injured by Riptide, briefly leaving him quadriplegic.
- Nightcrawler is left comatose after being ambushed by Riptide.
- Masque assumes control of the remaining Morlocks.
- After proving her bravery in fighting Sabretooth, Psylocke officially joins the X-Men.
- It is revealed that Sinister had the Morlocks killed because they had been experimented on by Dark Beast, who worked with Sinister in the universe of "Age of Apocalypse". Sinister recognized his work in the Morlocks and ordered them destroyed to keep his work secret.
- Gambit is revealed to have been employed by Mister Sinister to assemble the Marauders, though he did not partake in the Morlock massacre itself. Gambit is temporarily expelled from the X-Men for his part in the massacre.

== Background and creation ==
Writer Chris Claremont originally conceived the systematic killing of the Morlocks as a storyline that would run in the pages of Uncanny X-Men. X-Factor writer Louise Simonson felt that such a large storyline would run overly long in a single title, and suggested that it be done as a crossover between all three mutant titles.

Claremont and Simonson, the chief writers of the crossover, exchanged copies of their typewritten plots and scripts, and extensively discussed the intersecting storylines over the telephone. Asked what it was like to coordinate all the Mutant Massacre-linked stories, Simonson said "It was horrible. I don't know why we're thinking of doing this again."

Walt Simonson, who wrote the Thor installments of "Mutant Massacre" and pencilled the X-Factor instalments, said:

Partly, what we were trying to do in the crossover was not create a string of beads where you had to go from one bead to the next bead to the next bead in order to follow the entire storyline. What we were trying to do, rather, was to take several separate skeins and intertwine them in such a way that in the end they formed a coherent whole, but then unwound and went in their own directions. And you can follow any one skein through the Massacre: you can read X-Men, you can read X-Factor, or you can read Thor, New Mutants, Power Pack, or Daredevil without really having to go over and read all the other books. But, of course, then you don't get the whole picture.

== Collected editions ==
Title	Material collected	Published date	ISBN
X-Men: Mutant Massacre (TPB)	Uncanny X-Men #210-214, X-Factor #9-11, New Mutants #46	June 1997	978-0785102243
X-Men: Mutant Massacre (HC)	Uncanny X-Men #210-214, X-Factor #9-11, New Mutants #46, Thor #373-374, Power Pack #27, Daredevil #238	January 2010	978-0785138051
X-Men: Mutant Massacre Omnibus	Uncanny X-Men #210-219, X-Men Annual #11, X-Factor #9-17, X-Factor Annual #2, New Mutants #46, Thor #373-374 377-378, Power Pack #27, Daredevil #238, Fantastic Four vs. the X-Men #1-4, X-Men vs. the Avengers #1-4	January 2022	978-1302931599
