= Days of Future Present =

Marvel Comics Storyline

- Cover of X-Men Annual vol. 14, 1990, art by Art Adams
- Publisher: Marvel Comics
- Publication date: 1990
- Genre: Superhero; Crossover
- Title(s): Fantastic Four Annual #23; The New Mutants Annual #6; X-Factor Annual #5; The Uncanny X-Men Annual #14
- Main character(s): X-Men; X-Factor; New Mutants; Fantastic Four; Franklin Richards; Rachel Summers; Ahab

Creative team
- Writer(s): Walter Simonson; Louise Simonson; Chris Claremont
- Penciller(s): Jackson Guice; Jon Bogdanove; Terry Shoemaker; Chris Wozniak; Art Adams; Mark Heikel
- X-Men: Days of Future Present: ISBN 0-87135-739-9

"Days of Future Present" is a storyline published by Marvel Comics, appearing in the 1990 annuals of Fantastic Four, X-Factor, The New Mutants and The Uncanny X-Men. Centered on the appearance of an adult version of the powerful mutant Franklin Richards, it is a sequel to the popular "Days of Future Past" story arc from The Uncanny X-Men #141–142 (January–February 1981). The storyline unites the Fantastic Four, X-Factor, the New Mutants, and the remnants of a then-disbanded X-Men against a common foe from a dystopian alternate future. It features the first appearance of Gambit, and the first encounter between Jean Grey and her alternate future daughter Rachel Summers. Cyclops' baby son Nathan Christopher Charles Summers and the full-grown mutant antihero Cable are depicted in this story as two separate individuals, although they are subsequently revealed to be one and the same.

== Plot summary ==
=== Part 1: Fantastic Four Annual #23 ===
The Fantastic Four (Mr. Fantastic, the Invisible Woman, the Human Torch, the She-Thing, and Ben Grimm) and young Franklin Richards return to their headquarters at New York City's Four Freedoms Plaza to discover that it has been replaced by their previous headquarters, the Baxter Building. Upon investigating, they encounter a slightly younger version of the team from an alternate timeline. After the present-day FF is defeated in battle, an alternate adult version of Franklin reveals himself. Confused by the sight of the younger Franklin, the adult Franklin uses his mutant power to flee, restoring Four Freedoms Plaza with his departure. In doing so, his energy signature is sensed by Rachel Summers (who is in Great Britain with the team Excalibur), X-Men members Forge and Banshee (also in New York City), and a futuristic mutant-hunter named Ahab. After defeating a group of miniature Sentinel droids, the Fantastic Four (joined by Forge and Banshee) search for the adult Franklin at the home of the Power family. They find him there, but their efforts to reach out to the confused man fail, and he disappears.

=== Part 2: X-Factor Annual #5 ===
Although labelled "Part 2", the events in X-Factor Annual #5 actually take place after The New Mutants Annual #6, which was released later and was labelled "Part 3".

The adult Franklin observes the skyscraper-like extraterrestrial Ship which serves as X-Factor's Manhattan headquarters. Since the Ship is not in his memory of the past, he causes it to vanish. Having noticed the Ship's disappearance, Forge, Banshee and the Fantastic Four arrive, and team up with X-Factor (Cyclops, Jean Grey, Archangel, Iceman, and Beast) to locate the adult Franklin. Above the Statue of Liberty, the adult Franklin encounters the woman who was his true love in his own time: Rachel Summers. Having journeyed to the present some time ago, Rachel is now able to access the Phoenix Force. She is confused, as she witnessed Franklin's death in the future at the hands of the Sentinels. While the collective heroes protect the adult Franklin from a Sentinel attack, Jean Grey meets Rachel for the first time. Cyclops and Jean refuse to accept that Rachel is their daughter from a future where Cyclops's baby son (Nathan Christopher Charles Summers) does not exist. Rachel repels an attack from Ahab, who was her master during her many years as a Hound. Afterward, she flees the area, stung by her parents' rejection. The heroes are joined by the New Mutants (Sunspot, Warlock, Boom Boom, and Cannonball) and their new leader, Cable. They force Ahab to retreat. The adult Franklin returns after the battle. Noticing baby Nathan, who does not exist in his future timeline, Franklin causes the child to vanish. Cyclops collapses in shock and grief.

=== Part 3: The New Mutants Annual #6 ===
Although labelled "Part 3", the events in The New Mutants Annual #6 actually take place before X-Factor Annual #5, which was released earlier and was labelled "Part 2".

The adult Franklin travels to Professor Xavier's School for Gifted Youngsters. Cable and the New Mutants (Sunspot, Warlock, Boom Boom, Cannonball, Rictor and Wolfsbane) are attacked by Franklin and an adult incarnation of the team, including Cypher, who was killed during a New Mutants adventure months earlier. After the New Mutants realize the future team was conjured by Franklin, he disappears. Banshee and the Fantastic Four arrive with the present-day Franklin, and the heroes are all attacked by Ahab and his Hounds.

Appearing at the American Museum of Natural History, the adult Franklin remembers a futuristic Sentinel attack. In response, he lashes out with his power, destroying the Hounds in the present while the present-day Franklin watches. Horrified at the destructive nature of their powers, the two Franklins work in tandem to block young Franklin's power, ensuring that it can never be used again. Young Franklin lapses into a coma-like unconsciousness, and adult Franklin disappears.

=== Part 4: The Uncanny X-Men Annual #14 ===
After their last encounter, Rachel and the adult Franklin reunite and rekindle their love for one another. They reappear at Four Freedoms Plaza, stating that they now have a second chance at happiness. When Reed & Sue Richards bring up the problems with Ahab, baby Nathan, and X-Factor's Ship, adult Franklin induces in them a euphoric, docile state of mind, allowing him to leave. Young Franklin, still unconscious, grows weaker.

At Xavier's School, Cable and the New Mutants are joined by X-Men leader Storm and her new companion: a mutant named Gambit. Ahab transforms Cyclops and the Invisible Woman into Hounds, and uses them to locate and capture Rachel, the adult Franklin and baby Nathan. Meanwhile, Storm briefs the collective heroes on Rachel's dystopian future, where the Sentinels have conquered North America and almost all super-powered beings have been slain or imprisoned in internment camps. The heroes track down Ahab and defeat him, but he flees into the future, leaving Cyclops and the Invisible Woman as hounds.

Having learned from both Rachel and the Kitty Pryde of Rachel's timeline that Franklin is killed by the Sentinels in the future, Storm reasons that the adult Franklin is actually one of his "dream-selves", sent into the past at the moment of his death. To sustain himself, he has been subconsciously draining energy from his younger self and Rachel. Realizing that this would eventually kill them both, the adult Franklin releases the energies and allows himself to discorporate. The young Franklin regains consciousness with his latent powers intact, and Rachel uses the Phoenix Force to genetically restore Cyclops and the Invisible Woman to their natural forms. X-Factor's Ship reappears in Manhattan. The heroes are left with no way of determining if anything they have done will prevent the Sentinel-dominated timeline from coming to pass. However, Rachel still exists in her Hound uniform, leading her to believe that the future is unchanged. Jean reaches out to comfort her, but pulls back at the last moment. Devastated by this, Rachel departs, too upset to hear Jean's calls for her to come back. Later at her parents' house in Annandale-on-Hudson, New York, Jean studies the Shi'ar holo-empathic matrix crystal which Lilandra gave the Greys after Jean's supposed death. The crystal is imbued with the essence of both the Phoenix Force and Rachel, and Jean can learn everything she seeks to know about both of them simply by touching it. Filled with curiosity, fear and uncertainty, Jean wonders what she should do.

==== Part 4.1: "The Fundamental Things" ====
The events of this story take place between pages 10 and 11 of Part 4.

X-Men Annual #14 contains a back-up story entitled "The Fundamental Things", written by Chris Claremont and pencilled by Mark Heikel. The story is set in Madripoor, where Wolverine (accompanied by Psylocke) tells his new teenage companion Jubilee about Charles Xavier and the X-Men. In the middle of the discussion, Rachel and the adult Franklin appear. Wolverine, who mortally wounded Rachel to prevent her from murdering the psychic vampire Selene in The Uncanny X-Men #207, challenges Rachel's "the-ends-justify-the-means" method of confronting threats. Franklin causes Psylocke and Jubilee to vanish, as they are not part of his timeline. Wolverine lectures Franklin and Rachel on the virtues of the X-Men's ideals, and the need for the powerful to use their power responsibly and with restraint. Taking the man's words to heart, Franklin brings Psylocke and Jubilee back, along with baby Nathan. After Rachel and Franklin thank Wolverine for his advice, the two of them (and Nathan) disappear.
