= Cypher (Marvel Comics) =

Marvel Comics fictional character

- Cypher from X-Men Legacy #235. Art by Greg Land.

Publication information
- Publisher: Marvel Comics
- First appearance: The New Mutants #13 (March 1984); As Revelation: X-Men: Heir of Apocalypse #4 (September 2024)
- Created by: Chris Claremont (writer); Sal Buscema (artist)

In-story information
- Alter ego: Douglas Aaron "Doug" Ramsey
- Species: Human mutant
- Team affiliations: New Mutants; Hellions; X-Force; X-Men; X-Factor; Quiet Council of Krakoa; Swordbearers of Krakoa
- Partnerships: Warlock; Bei the Blood Moon (wife)
- Notable aliases: Revelation
- Abilities: Semi-telepathic and semi-clairvoyant omnilingualism (intuitively translates any languages he comes into contact with, including written, spoken, computer, or body language).

Cypher (Doug Ramsey) is a character appearing in American comic books published by Marvel Comics. Created by Chris Claremont and Sal Buscema, the character first appeared in The New Mutants #13 (March 1984). Cypher belongs to the subspecies of humans called mutants, who are born with superhuman abilities. He possesses the power to understand any language, allowing him to read, write, and communicate in any language.

Doug Ramsey is a young mutant from New York who later joins the New Mutants and forms a close friendship with fellow member Warlock. Reception to the character was negative, largely stemming from his lack of combat prowess. As a result, Cypher was killed off in The New Mutants #60 (February 1988). He was resurrected during the 2009 storyline "Necrosha" and went on to join teams such as Excalibur, X-Factor, and the X-Men, while maintaining membership in the New Mutants.

Cypher was a key character during the Krakoan Age of X-Men comics, due to his ability to communicate with Krakoa, the island that housed the mutant nation. The X-Men: From the Ashes relaunch saw Cypher become Apocalypse's new heir, known as Revelation. A future version of Revelation appears as the main antagonist of the storyline Age of Revelation.

== Publication history ==
Created by writer Chris Claremont and artist Sal Buscema, the character first appeared in The New Mutants #13 (March 1984). Initially used as a supporting cast member, he was assimilated into the titular superteam in The New Mutants #21 (November 1984). During his run as a member of the team, Cypher was the least popular of the New Mutants, as series writer Louise Simonson recounted: "He wasn't fun to draw. He just stood around and hid behind a tree during a fight... Every artist who ever did him said 'Can't we kill this guy?' We would get letters from fans about how much they hated him. We never got any letters from people saying they liked him until he was dead."

Cypher was killed in The New Mutants #60 (February 1988). The story was acclaimed as one of the most touching moments in the series, and sparked a surge in popularity for the character. Following his death, Cypher was frequently referenced and even had a solo story in The New Mutants Annual #6 (July 1990), appearing as a ghost. His tombstone appears as one of Magneto's most traumatic memories when psychically assaulted by Professor X and Jean Grey. After the events of the "Phalanx Covenant" storyline, a techno-organic being known as "Douglock" takes Cypher's form in Excalibur #78 (June 1994), but this being turns out to be Warlock infused with Cypher's memories.

The character was resurrected during the 2009–2010 "Necrosha" storyline and appeared regularly in subsequent issues of New Mutants (vol. 3) (2009–2012), All-New X-Factor (2014–2015), and New Mutants (vol. 4) (2020–2023). In the 2024 limited series X-Men: Heir of Apocalypse, Cypher is selected as the heir to Apocalypse, transformed to resemble his predecessor, and renamed Revelation.

== Fictional character biography ==
=== New Mutants ===
Douglas Aaron "Doug" Ramsey was born to Philip and Sheila Ramsey in Westchester County, New York. He becomes friends with Kitty Pryde after she moves there to join Xavier's School for Gifted Youngsters. The two share an interest in computers, Kitty's talent for building hardware complementing Doug's skill at writing software.

A talented hacker, Doug serves as a supporting character for his first few appearances, unaware of Kitty's mutant powers or the true nature of Xavier's School. When Emma Frost offers Doug a scholarship to her Massachusetts Academy, hoping to recruit him to serve the villainous Hellfire Club as a member of the Hellions, Kitty accompanies him on a trip there and is captured, but she is later rescued by the New Mutants. Though Doug's memory of the mutant-related events is wiped by Frost, he does not accept the scholarship.

The New Mutants later call upon Doug to help them communicate with the newly-arrived techno-organic alien Warlock, revealing that they are mutants and superheroes and that Doug himself is a mutant. Doug subsequently becomes a member of the New Mutants, taking the alias Cypher. With Cypher's affinity for technology and being more readily able to understand Warlock than most others, the two of them become fast friends. Whereas Warlock refers to his teammates with the prefix "selfriend," after Cypher saves his life by offering to share some of his life energy with Warlock, Warlock gives Cypher the unique identifier of "selfsoulfriend".

Cypher becomes the team's computer expert and researcher, writing programs for the X-Men's Danger Room. He is the only one of the New Mutants who never tells his parents that he is a mutant, as he fears rejection. Despite being instrumental in many of his team's successful missions, Cypher suffers from occasional feelings of inadequacy. These feelings are driven by his lack of combat-oriented powers and the way Warlock often encapsulates him to provide defense in times of danger.

Cypher helps rescue Psylocke from Mojo, venturing deep into her mind and saving her psyche from being torn apart by Spiral. The shared experience creates a deep emotional bond between the two, though neither pursue those feelings any further due to their inappropriate age difference. Cypher is initially interested in pursuing a romantic relationship with Kitty, but they eventually decide to remain friends, and he later enters into a relationship with his teammate Wolfsbane.

When Warlock's father, the Magus, attacks the team, Cypher defeats him by reprogramming him into an infantile state. After the New Mutants rescue a humanoid bird creature named Bird-Brain, Cypher is initially jealous of Wolfsbane's affection for him, but after he manages to understand and translate the creature's language, he and Wolfsbane bond with Bird-Brain. During the subsequent battle against the Ani-Mator, a geneticist working for Cameron Hodge, Cypher takes a bullet intended for Wolfsbane and dies.

Magneto, leader of the New Mutants at the time, explains Cypher's death to his parents as a hunting accident. A grief-stricken Warlock tries to steal Cypher's body in a confused attempt to reanimate it, but his teammates convince him to return the body. Cypher's ghost later appears to Wolfsbane when she visits his grave in the cemetery. He appears in a fantasy staged by Captain Britain's patron Merlyn to aid Excalibur in exposing and battling the vengeful spirit of the late X-Men member Changeling.

=== Douglock ===
Warlock is killed by Cameron Hodge during the 1990–1991 "X-Tinction Agenda" event, and his ashes are scattered on Cypher's grave at Wolfsbane's request. Later, the techno-organic Phalanx resurrect Warlock with Cypher's memories and appearance, intending to use him as a "Trojan horse" to infiltrate the X-Men. This gestalt entity, called Douglock, breaks free of the Phalanx's programming and joins Excalibur. Unaware of his real identity as Warlock, Douglock believes himself to be a new entity based on the "genetic and mental engrams" of Cypher and Warlock. He enters into a relationship with Wolfsbane and becomes a valued part of Excalibur, appearing regularly in the Excalibur title until its conclusion. After the team disbands, Warlock's personality resurfaces, but exhibits more human speech patterns and appearance. Warlock manifests Cypher's translation powers and maintains a copy of Cypher's memory, but Cypher's personality is not active.

=== Resurrection and New Mutants Reunion ===
During the 2009–2010 "Necrosha" event, Cypher is resurrected with the transmode virus as a thrall of Selene and Eli Bard and tasked with killing former teammate Magma. He is confronted by his old teammates, during which he displays a greatly enhanced ability to read body language and anticipate actions, and is subdued. After Warlock fails to restore his true personality, Cypher is kidnapped by the Hellions, who wish to reprogram him, but he is rescued by his former teammates, who sever his connection to Selene and restore his original personality and free will. Cypher joins the X-Men's New Mutants squad and makes regular appearances throughout subsequent issues of New Mutants (vol. 3). The transmode virus which rebuilt his body is still present, but Cypher reprograms it into permanent remission.

Cypher appears in the 2010 "Second Coming" event, during which he helps defeat Cameron Hodge with his enhanced abilities, accompanies X-Force on a time-travelling mission to stop an invasion of Sentinels from the future, and assists Cable in defeating Master Mold.

Following the 2011 "Schism" and the 2011–2012 "Regenesis" events, Cypher, along with most of the New Mutants, moves to the X-Men's island base of Utopia off the coast of San Francisco. He plays a key role in defeating an alternate future version of himself called Truefriend, which had taken over the world by splicing Warlock's tech into people under the guise of helping them. With the help of Doctor Strange, Truefriend is prevented from coming into existence.

=== All-New X-Factor ===
Cypher joins the corporate-sponsored X-Factor and regularly appears in All-New X-Factor (2014–2015), during which time he has a casual sexual encounter with his robotic teammate Danger. This strains his relationship with Warlock, who has romantic feelings for Danger, but the two later reconcile.

=== Hunt for Wolverine ===
After X-Factor disbands, Cypher isolates himself to focus on decoding the entire Internet. However, his powers will not allow him to stop once he begins, causing him to develop an addiction to Internet use. He becomes a hermit, living in a dilapidated shack in New Jersey. During the 2018 "Hunt for Wolverine" storyline, Cypher is approached by Daredevil, Misty Knight, and Nur for help in locating Wolverine. Initially unresponsive and hostile when Nur cuts off his Internet access, Cypher eventually calms down and agrees to assist, though abstaining from Internet use affects him negatively. At the investigation's conclusion, Cypher admits his addiction and turns to Daredevil for help. His Internet addiction subsequently stabilizes.

Cypher also aids Daredevil in bringing down Kingpin, who had taken over from Matt Murdock as Mayor of New York.

=== Krakoan Age ===
In the 2019 House of X and Powers of X miniseries, Cypher helps establish Krakoa as a mutant nation, using his powers to communicate with the island. He is granted a seat on the Quiet Council and acts as the voice of Krakoa, representing the island's interests in matters of state. In addition to his Quiet Council duties, Cypher rejoins the New Mutants once more, and appears regularly in New Mutants (vol. 4) and other various X-Men titles throughout the Krakoan Age.

During the 2020–2021 "X of Swords" event, Cypher is chosen as one of Krakoa's representatives in the eponymous tournament, wielding Warlock as his "sword." He is slated to face off against Bei the Blood Moon, a member of the opposing team from Arakko. Rather than fight, they are made to marry, earning each of their teams a point for completing the ceremony. Though they are largely strangers to each other, Cypher is fascinated with Bei due to his inability to understand her (a result of her psionic powers conflicting with his own). During Annihilation's invasion of Otherworld at the end of the tournament, Cypher convinces his new wife to betray her Arakkii comrades and help the Krakoans fight the forces of Amenth. Despite the circumstances of their marriage and their communication barrier, Cypher and Bei remain married after the tournament and live together happily on Krakoa, appearing together in subsequent X-Men titles.

During the 2022 "Destiny of X" event, after the Quiet Council is revealed to potentially be under the influence of Mister Sinister, the council votes to disband. Krakoa quickly swallows Cypher and traps him somewhere underground, refusing to release him for his own protection. Distraught by the disappearance of her beloved husband, Bei employs numerous scent trackers and telepaths to locate him, but none can detect his presence on Krakoa.

Cypher is eventually released and reappears during the 2023 "Fall of X" event. He participates in the X-Men's counteroffensive against the anti-mutant terrorist group Orchis and later assists in remerging a fractured Krakoa.

=== From the Ashes ===
Cypher appears in the 2024 miniseries X-Men: Heir of Apocalypse, in which he is chosen to compete in a tournament to be the successor of Apocalypse. Ultimately, Cypher wins the tournament. Transformed by Celestial technology into Revelation, he commits himself to evolving Apocalypse's legacy and protecting mutant-kind on Earth.

== Powers and abilities ==
Cypher is a mutant who possesses a superhuman intuitive facility for translating languages, spoken or written, human or alien in origin. His superhuman skill is extended to his great facility in deciphering codes and computer languages, and he is also able to read inflection and body language which allows him to understand the vast subtext of a conversation. Rather than working the problem out step by step in his conscious mind, he instead subconsciously solves the problem. Hence, he can reach the correct solution by means that appear to be leaps of logic, and he himself may not be consciously aware of the entire process by which he reaches the right answer.

Since his resurrection by Selene's use of the transmode virus, Cypher's powers have evolved to the point where he can read all aspects of "language." He is able to read his opponents' body language and the patterns of their combat moves to counter the attacks of several opponents attacking him at once. By considering the exercise of combat skills to be a form of language, he proved a match for the combined might of the New Mutants. He is able to "read" architectural structure and integrity to ascertain a building's weaknesses. He also appears capable of "speaking" binary; giving verbal commands in machine code that can reprogram the machine.

Cypher is an expert in translating and designing computer software. He took university-level courses in languages and computer science. He can hack some of the most protected computers.

Cypher has been infected by techno-organic viruses on multiple occasions. The presence of the virus has allowed him at times to cheat death and to demonstrate techno-organic shapeshifting, transmode infection, and life-absorption abilities.

Cypher was taught by an imprisoned Magik how to cast a mystical teleportation spell which allows him to transport himself and others to either Hell or Hel.

Cypher is the only mutant who can communicate with the island Krakoa and interpret the island's sentiments.

Cypher's powers render him unable to understand any being who communicates without language. For example, Bei the Blood Moon's Doom Note is a sound and not a language, thus Cypher is incapable of understanding it, regardless of the Doom Note's psionic translation of itself to be understood by all who hear it.

As Revelation, Cypher's linguistic powers were greatly enhanced by Apocalypse's Celestial technology and he gained additional abilities, including increased strength and durability and the power to compel others to follow his verbal commands, an ability dubbed the "Voice of God." Revelation's Voice of God is shown to affect not only living beings, such as people and animals, but also plants. However, it has no effect on people with abnormal brain physiologies, such as the mutant Xorn, whose brain is a black hole.

== Reception ==
In 2014, Darren Franich of Entertainment Weekly ranked Cypher 48th in his "Let's rank every X-Man ever" list. Franich criticized the initial usage of the character, whose powers have a large amount of potential yet went underused until his resurrection. Adding to this, he stated that Cypher was initially depicted as a "milquetoast blond kid".

== Other versions ==
=== Age of Apocalypse ===
In the alternate world of the Age of Apocalypse crossover, Doug Ramsey is the adopted son of Destiny and lives in Avalon. His "translation field" allows everyone in Avalon to understand each other, no matter what language they speak. Doug is killed when he jumps in front of Destiny to protect her from the Shadow King's last desperate attack, a course of action that convinces his adoptive mother to become involved in defeating Apocalypse.

=== Age of Revelation ===
During the "Age of Revelation" storyline, an alternate timeline version of Revelation grows hungry for power and releases the X-Virus, which either kills humans or turns them into mutants. In addition, he enhances four mutants to serve as his Choristers (paralleling Apocalypse's Horsemen) and conquers much of the eastern United States, renamed the Revelation Territories. Anyone who opposes Cypher is reduced to a Babel by having all languages stripped from them. Revelation uses the X-Virus to assimilate the Earth and everyone on it, becoming a living planet.

=== Age of X ===
An alternate universe version of Cypher appears in "Age of X." This version is an ally of Magneto who was infected with an alien substance, giving him the ability to regenerate his body and control technology.

=== Cyberlock ===
An alternate universe version of Cypher appears in X-Force Annual #1 (May 1992). This version is a member of X-Force who fused with Warlock while retaining his memories, becoming known as Cyberlock.

=== Days of Future Present ===
An alternate universe version of Cypher appears in "Days of Future Present." This version is infected with the transmode virus, leaving the left side of his body mechanical.

=== Exiles ===
An alternate universe version of Cypher appears in the Exiles story arc "Legacy". This version is fused with Warlock after being infected with the Legacy Virus, creating a new virus called Vi-Lock that infects over half of Earth's population. Once the virus was introduced to Warlock's unique physiology, it mutated and became even more contagious. With over half the world infected by this new technological virus (called Vi-Locks), Cypher is kept in stasis. He is killed by one of the infected, once it found out the Exiles were trying to create a cure based on Cypher's original strain of the virus.

=== House of M ===
An alternate universe version of Cypher appears in "House of M." This version is a teacher at the New Mutant Leadership Institute.

=== Marvel Zombies ===
A zombified alternate universe version of Cypher appears in Deadpool: Merc with a Mouth #9.

=== Rahne of Terra ===
An alternate universe version of Cypher appears in Wolverine: Rahne of Terra and its sequel, Wolverine: Knight of Terra. This version is a peasant named Doug who marries Queen Rain of the magical land of Geshem and becomes her prince consort. Shortly after Rain becomes queen, Doug successfully defeats a rebellion led by a traitorous duke and his army of ensorcelled mechanical constructs, but is grievously wounded in battle. The Shaman (Professor X's counterpart) uses the remains of the duke's constructs to heal Doug's body.

=== Truefriend ===
An alternate timeline version of Cypher appears in New Mutants (vol. 3) (2012). This version permanently merges with Warlock and then kills his former friend. He takes over Earth using Warlock's transmode virus and becomes known as Truefriend. He is defeated by the New Mutants of the mainstream continuity and prevented from ever coming into existence.

=== Ultimate Marvel ===
An alternate universe version of Cypher appears in the Ultimate Marvel imprint. This version is a human computer programmer and a student at Emma Frost's Academy of Tomorrow. During the "Ultimatum" storyline, he is killed by Jamie Madrox.

=== What If...? ===
An alternate universe version of Cypher appears in What If...? (vol. 2) #12 (April 1990). This version is a scholar and Storm's vizier after she becomes queen of Asgard.
