= Bird-Brain (Marvel Comics) =

- Bird-Brain as depicted in Official Handbook of the Marvel Universe Update '89 #1 (March 1989). Art by Bret Blevins (penciller), Josef Rubinstein (inker), and Andy Yunchus (colorist).

Publication information
- Publisher: Marvel Comics
- First appearance: The New Mutants #56 (Oct. 1987)
- Created by: Louise Simonson and June Brigman

In-story information
- Alter ego: Bird-Brain
- Team affiliations: New Mutants
- Notable aliases: Bird Boy
- Abilities: Flight

Bird-Brain is a character appearing in American comic books published by Marvel Comics, primarily in association with the New Mutants. He was introduced in a story arc lasting from The New Mutants #56 to issue #61 as an ally of the New Mutants who resembles an anthropomorphic bird and was among the Ani-Mates created by the Ani-Mator, a mad geneticist. Bird-Brain befriends New Mutants member Cypher, who is able to comprehend his language and is ultimately killed in a mission to free the Ani-Mates from the Ani-Mator's custody.

== Publication history ==
Bird-Brain first appeared in The New Mutants #55 (September 1987), and was first fully seen in The New Mutants #56 (October 1987). The character was created by Louise Simonson and June Brigman.

== Fictional character biography ==
Bird-Brain is one of a number of "Ani-Mates", creatures created by an insane geneticist named the Ani-Mator, combining the characteristics of humans and animals. The Ani-Mator subjects his creations to a number of cruel and deadly experiments before Bird-Brain escapes the Ani-Mator's island and befriends the New Mutants. Bird-Brain's simplistic language leaves him unable to communicate any of the New Mutants except for Cypher, who possesses the mutant ability to understand all languages. Bird-Brain and Cypher become close friends.

Feeling he had abandoned the other mutated creatures on the island, Bird-Brain returns with the New Mutants to free them. The Ani-Mator, attempting to shoot Wolfsbane, instead kills Cypher. Magik exiles the Ani-Mator to Limbo in retaliation, where he is eaten by demons. Once freed from the Ani-Mator's tyranny, Bird-Brain decides to remain on the island with the other Ani-Mates.

Some time later, the New Mutants return to Bird-Brain's island and learn that he and the Ani-Mates have been infected with a virus created by the Ani-Mator prior to his death in a bid to resurrect himself. Bird-Brain does not recognize the New Mutants and attacks them before being stopped by Warlock. The New Mutants destroy the virus, restoring Bird-Brain to normal.
