= Days of Future Past =

Marvel Comics X-Men storyline

- Cover of The Uncanny X-Men vol. 141, Jan, 1981, art by John Byrne and Terry Austin
- Publisher: Marvel Comics
- Publication date: January – February 1981
- Genre: Superhero
Title(s)
The Uncanny X-Men #141–142
- Main character(s): X-Men; Brotherhood of Evil Mutants; Sentinels

Creative team
- Writer(s): Chris Claremont; John Byrne
- Penciller: John Byrne
- Inker: Terry Austin
- Trade paperback: ISBN 0-7851-1560-9
- Graphic novel: ISBN 0871355825
- Essential X-Men Vol. 2: ISBN 0785102981

"Days of Future Past" is a storyline in the Marvel Comics comic book The Uncanny X-Men issues #141–142, published in 1981. It deals with a dystopian future in which mutants are incarcerated in internment camps. An adult Kate Pryde transfers her mind into her younger self, the present-day Kitty Pryde, who brings the X-Men to prevent a fatal moment in history that triggers anti-mutant hysteria.

The storyline was produced during the franchise's rise to popularity under the writer/artist team of Chris Claremont, John Byrne and Terry Austin. The dark future seen in the story has been revisited numerous times, and was the basis for the 2014 film X-Men: Days of Future Past, wherein Wolverine is projected back in time by Pryde. In 2001, fans voted the first issue of this storyline as the 25th greatest Marvel comic.

The Official Handbook to the Marvel Universe: Alternate Universes 2005 gave the numerical designation for the original "Days of Future Past" timeline as Earth-811 in the Marvel Multiverse.

== Plot ==
The storyline alternates between the present year of 1980 and the future year of 2013. In the future, Sentinels rule a dystopian United States, and mutants are hunted and placed in internment camps. Having conquered North America and hunted all mutants and other superhumans, the Sentinels are turning their attention to the rest of the world. On the eve of a feared nuclear holocaust, the few remaining X-Men, while making a desperate attempt to stop the Sentinels, send Kitty Pryde's mind backward through time, to possess the body of her younger-self and to prevent a pivotal event in mutant–human history and the cause of these events: the assassination of Senator Robert Kelly along with Charles Xavier and Moira MacTaggert by Mystique's newly reassembled Brotherhood of Evil Mutants.

Working with the present-day X-Men, Kitty Pryde's future-self succeeds in her mission and is pulled back to her own time, while her present-day-self is returned with no memory of any interim. The world of 2013 is not shown again in this story arc; the present-day X-Men are left to ponder whether their future dystopia has been averted or simply delayed.

== Background and creation ==
John Byrne devised the plot for "Days of Future Past", since he wanted to do a story featuring the Sentinels and his collaborator Chris Claremont had no interest in coming up with one. Years later, Byrne said, he realized that he had unconsciously lifted the "spine" of the plot from the 1972 Doctor Who serial Day of the Daleks.

== Sequels and prequels ==
Byrne intended "Days of Future Past" to be a completely self-contained story, with the future world seen in the story no longer existing even as an alternate timeline following the conclusion. However, a number of stories have revisited this future and even acted as outright sequels.

Rachel Summers, a character seen in the future segments of "Days of Future Past", later travels through time to the present day and joins the X-Men. A supervillain, Ahab, follows her to the present in the "Days of Future Present" crossover. In this story, Ahab kidnaps the children Franklin Richards (son of Mister Fantastic and the Invisible Woman and, in the future timeline, Rachel's lover) and Nathan Summers (son of Cyclops and Madelyne Pryor) but is defeated by the X-Men, X-Factor, the New Mutants, and the Fantastic Four.

Rachel joins the European mutant team Excalibur, whose series twice revisited the "Days of Future Past" timeline. The first time was in a story by Alan Davis entitled "Days of Future Yet To Come", in which a time-traveling Excalibur and several Marvel UK heroes overthrow the Sentinel rulers of future America. This storyline also reveals that Excalibur's robotic "mascot" Widget had been possessed by the spirit of the future Kitty Pryde.

A similar but distinct reality is seen in a vision by her teammate Captain Britain. This story, "Days of Future Tense", reveals the final fate of that timeline's Excalibur team.

A prelude to "Days of Future Past" was produced in a three-part mini-series entitled "Wolverine: Days of Future Past". This three-issue mini dealt with ramifications between the catalyst for the creation of the alternative future up until the main storyline in Uncanny X-Men 141–142. The prelude explains why Logan leaves for Canada and why Magneto is in a wheelchair in the main two-issue story.

Another view of this reality was presented in the second issue of Hulk: Broken Worlds. A short story, "Out of Time", examines the life of Bruce Banner (the Hulk) in a Sentinel prison camp.

The miniseries Days of Future Past: Doomsday looks at what happened to other characters as this world fell apart, such as Spider-Man being beaten to death in an anti-mutant riot and Thunderbolt Ross and the Avengers resigning from the government in protest at what they were being asked to do.

A prequel, initially only available in the Marvel Made Paragon Collection, counts how the surviving X-Men rescued Rachel Summers and freed her from conditioning as a Hound.

A sequel based on the original storyline written by Marguerite Bennett, Years of Future Past, was released in June 2015, featuring the "Days of Future Past" timeline depicted in the 2015 "Secret Wars" storyline. The setting on Battleworld is called the Sentinel Territories. Major characters in the series include Christina Pryde and Cameron, the children of Kate Pryde and Colossus.

== In other media ==
=== Television ===
- The "Days of Future Past" storyline was adapted in the X-Men animated series. The storyline concepts were combined with another alternative future story—that of Bishop and the idea of a traitor within the ranks of the X-Men, though Mystique is still responsible for Senator Kelly's assassination. Bishop plays the role of Kitty Pryde in the adaptation—albeit traveling completely back in time instead of just projecting his mind into his past self—while the 'traitor' is 'revealed' to be Gambit, with the X-Men's interference revealing that Mystique had killed Senator Kelly while in the guise of Gambit, to try and frame the X-Men.
- The series Wolverine and the X-Men has a similar storyline, in which Professor X is in a coma for 20 years, and awakens to find that the mutants are imprisoned by the Sentinels. He telepathically connects with the X-Men of the past to try to prevent that future from happening. By the end of the first season, the Sentinel-dominated future is averted, but replaced with a future based on "Age of Apocalypse".
- A Days of Future Past incarnation appears in The Super Hero Squad Show episode "Days, Nights, and Weekends of Future Past!".
- A Madland level based on "Days of Future Past" appears in the Ultimate Spider-Man episode "Game Over". Mutant Arcade designs the level under the basis of Sentinels being used to destroy mutants. The scenario features a shot of Wolverine being blasted by a Sentinel in an homage to the cover of Uncanny X-Men #142.
- Hulk and the Agents of S.M.A.S.H. features a five-part episode entitled "Days of Future Smash", which consists of the Hulk chasing the Leader throughout time. The episode's title is a reference to Days of Future Past.
- A future resembling that in Days of Future Past briefly appears in the Moon Girl and Devil Dinosaur episode "Skip This Ad...olescence" as Moon Girl is accidentally sent into the future. The scene itself homages the cover of Uncanny X-Men #141. Executive producer Steve Loter later hinted on his Twitter account that the scene foreshadowed elements from the series' planned storyline.
- The second season premiere of X-Men '97 is entitled "Days of Past Future". The episode's title is a reference to Days of Future Past.

=== Film ===
X-Men: Days of Future Past is a sequel to First Class. Numerous actors from the franchise returned, including Hugh Jackman, Halle Berry, Ian McKellen, Patrick Stewart, James McAvoy, Michael Fassbender, Anna Paquin, Elliot Page, Shawn Ashmore, Daniel Cudmore, Nicholas Hoult, Jennifer Lawrence, and Lucas Till. Newcomers Peter Dinklage, Omar Sy, Adan Canto, Fan Bingbing, Booboo Stewart and Evan Peters were also signed to play Bolivar Trask, Bishop, Sunspot, Blink, Warpath and Quicksilver, respectively. Although Wolverine is the one who is actually sent backward in time to his "younger" body, director Bryan Singer described Pryde as the prime facilitator and it is Pryde's phasing ability that enables time travel to happen. In this film, the catalyst for the Sentinel-dominated future was Mystique's assassination of Bolivar Trask and her subsequent capture, with analysis of her DNA allowing humanity to devise Sentinels capable of adapting to any mutant power. After Shadowcat learns how to use her abilities to 'phase' someone into their past self, Xavier and Magneto decide to have her send someone back in time to the year 1973 to prevent Mystique from killing Trask, with Wolverine choosing to go as he is the only one who can survive the process due to his regenerative healing factor. Upon arriving in 1973, Wolverine locates the past versions of Xavier, Hank McCoy, and Magneto and convinces them to help him prevent their extinction. Although Magneto nearly jeopardizes the plan when he tries to kill Mystique and takes control of the Sentinels as part of his own plan to save the mutant race, Xavier is able to convince Mystique to spare Trask, resulting in her being publicly shown defending President Richard Nixon from Magneto. As a result, Mystique is hailed as a hero, the Sentinel program is scrapped, and Trask is arrested for selling his designs to foreign nations. The film ends with Wolverine waking up in a revised, idyllic future in which the war with the Sentinels never happened and all of the X-Men are still alive.

=== Video games ===
Ultimate Marvel vs. Capcom 3 has a "Days of Future Past"-inspired stage serving as an alternative to the standard Metro City stage, with an "Apprehended"/"Slain" poster similar to the famous one, featuring characters from both Marvel and Capcom that starred in Marvel vs. Capcom 2: New Age of Heroes, but did not return for the Marvel vs. Capcom 3 games. Taking the place of the playable Wolverine is Mega Man.

To coincide with the release of the film, GlitchSoft, a mobile app developer, released The Uncanny X-Men: Days of Future Past for iOS and Android devices. The game is a side-scrolling 2-D action adventure, with a storyline closer to the original comic book, than the one portrayed in the film. Initially players will be able to control Wolverine, and as they advance further in the game, they will be able to choose between Kitty Pryde, Colossus, Scarlet Witch and Cyclops, with Storm, Polaris and Magneto announced as additional characters, each one with different powers and abilities, which is upgradable as the player progress in the game, by obtaining experience points.

The ending of the X-Men Origins: Wolverine video game is set in a not so distant future in which Wolverine (in an X-Men costume) breaks free from captivity by Bolivar Trask to discover Sentinels have taken over the world.

Stern Pinball released "The Uncanny X-Men" in 2024. This pinball machine was designed by Jack Danger. The plot of the game follows the story line of Days of future past by having the player jump between time in past and future. There is a giant sentinel head in the game that's used as a bash toy to simulate battling the sentinel army. Artwork for the game was inspired by the designs of the X-Men animated series and recreated by artist Zombie Yetti.

=== Novel ===
A novel adaptation by Vicki Kamida was released in 1994 and published by Random House.

A novelization of the comic version of "Days of Future Past" by Alex Irvine was released in May 2014 by Marvel Comics that tied into the release of the film, X-Men: Days of Future Past. It essentially follows the plot of the original comic storyline, but with two particular changes to the events set in the future: Magneto survives the escape of the Sentinel camp and hides until his powers are restored to the point that he can annihilate the remaining Sentinels, and Kitty is conscious in the body of her future self rather than remaining comatose until she is returned to her own time. A GraphicAudio dramatised adaptation based upon this novelisation was released in 2015.

== In popular culture ==
In "Genesis", the first episode of the television series Heroes, the character of Hiro Nakamura cites Kitty's traveling through time as teaching him about the concepts of time travel. Hiro states that the comic taught him that time is a circle, even though it actually insinuated that time branched. The episode "Five Years Gone" was a further homage to the story, featuring Hiro and his friend Ando travelling into a future where New York has been destroyed and people with abilities are being hunted, forcing them to travel back into the past to prevent the original explosion.

== Collected editions ==
- Days of Future Past (TPB) ISBN 0-7851-1560-9 collects X-Men #138–141, The Uncanny X-Men #142–143 and X-Men Annual No. 4
- Days of Future Past (graphic novel) ISBN 0-87135-582-5 collects X-Men No. 141 and The Uncanny X-Men No. 142
- Essential X-Men Vol. 2 ISBN 0-7851-0298-1 collects X-Men #120–141, The Uncanny X-Men #142–144

== See also ==
- Multiverse (Marvel Comics)
