= Necrosha =

2009–10 Marvel comic book crossover storyline

- Cover to Necrosha One Shot. Art by Clayton Crain
- Publisher: Marvel Comics
- Publication date: October 2009 – March 2010
- Genre: Superhero; Crossover
Title(s)
New Mutants vol. 3, #6–8
X-Force vol. 3, #21–25 Annual #1
X-Men: Legacy vol. 1, #231–233
X-Necrosha #1
X-Nerosha: The Gathering #1
Dazzler #1
- Main character(s): X-Force; New Mutants; X-Men; Deadpool; Selene

Creative team
- Writer(s): Craig Kyle; Christopher Yost; Mike Carey; Zeb Wells
- X-Necrosha: ISBN 0-7851-4674-1

"Necrosha" is a 2009–10 comic book crossover storyline published by Marvel Comics featuring the X-Men family of characters. In the storyline, Selene decides to utilize the techno-organic virus power to bring any deceased mutants back to life, allowing her to begin her quest to ascend to godhood. This prompts multiple mutant teams to fight against Selene in an attempt to free the newly resurrected mutants. The storyline is notable for reviving a vast majority of its characters.

== Publication history ==
Necrosha had been slowly building in the pages of X-Force and began in earnest with the one-shot X-Necrosha, released on October 28, 2009, and continued in X-Force, New Mutants, and X-Men: Legacy.

== Plot ==
Through her servant, Eli Bard, Selene gains access to the Technarch transmode virus, which she uses to resurrect dead mutants. This resurrection is the beginning of her plan to become a goddess.

Selene orders her minions to bring Destiny, one of the resurrected mutants, to her. Selene wants to know what her future holds; Destiny tells her she will achieve what she has set out to do, and is put back in her cell again. Destiny insists she needs to do something, that otherwise these events will end badly. Destiny is able to contact Blindfold in Utopia and asks the girl to deliver a message. Destiny believes that she has made a mistake. Selene, however, gets something she did not plan for: Proteus is brought back to life along with the resurrected Destiny.

Selene returns to the place of her birth in central Europe, accompanied by her new Inner Circle, consisting of Blink, Senyaka, Mortis, Wither, and Eli Bard. They then travel to the New York branch of the Hellfire Club, where they slaughter every person there. She targets others who, according to her, have failed her in her quest for godhood, such as Sebastian Shaw, Donald Pierce, and Emma Frost. She also intends to attack the X-Men, because they have opposed her many times, and Magma, for her betrayal in Nova Roma. Caliban and Thunderbird lead her to the ruins of Genosha, where she claims her journey will end, welcoming them to what she now dubs Necrosha. She sends most of the resurrected mutants to attack the X-Men on Utopia, and dispatches Cypher to kill Magma.

With Eli Bard, Selene resurrects the massacred residents of Genosha. However, many of the dead have been depowered, despite having been killed before M-Day. The Coven begins to set up a base at Necrosha.

Meanwhile, Cypher sneaks into Magma's room and knocks her unconscious; however, he cannot complete his mission of killing her due to the intervention of his former teammates and the arrival of Warlock. Sensing that something is not right, Eli Bard reports to Selene what is happening, prompting her to send the Hellions to help and to retrieve Cypher. The former members of the New Mutants team manage to defeat the Hellions, while Magik finds out that her soulsword can damage the mutants revived by the techno-organic virus. Warlock returns and, in combination with Magik's soulsword, manages to free Cypher from the Black Queen's influence, fully resurrecting him.

Amidst the chaos, a squad of resurrected Acolytes have come for the former White King of the Hellfire Club, Magneto. They fight Loa and temporary X-Man Deadpool, who finds out that Loa's powers can damage the mutants revived by the techno-organic virus.

While the X-Men battle Selene's troops in Utopia, Hrimhari finds out that his beloved Wolfsbane, who is in a coma, is pregnant with his child (who is neither mutant nor human), and Doctor Nemesis reveals that the unborn child is threatening her life. Hrimhari gives his soul to the Asgardian goddess of the Underworld, Hela, in exchange for her restoring Elixir (who was also in a coma) to life. Hela does so, and they return to the Asgardian Underworld together, Hrimhari's final words being "that he would somehow find his way back to [Wolfsbane] and their unborn child." Elixir heals Wolfsbane. When he realizes that she is pregnant with Hrimhari's child, and that she will not survive the birth, he transfers some of the baby's strength to Wolfsbane.

Meanwhile, on Muir Island, Proteus uses Destiny's body to send the message to Blindfold in order to lure the X-Men there. After Blindfold delivers Destiny's message to the X-Men, Cyclops sends her to Muir Island alongside a team composed of Nightcrawler, Rogue, Psylocke, Colossus, Husk, Trance, and Magneto. Proteus manages to leave Colossus unconscious and take mental possession of the whole team except for Rogue and Magneto. After a hard battle, Magneto manages to disperse Proteus's form, while Rogue (and later Psylocke) frees her teammates and Destiny from Proteus's possession. Magneto, however, recognizes that Proteus is still alive and it is only a matter of time before he returns. Destiny, recognizing that the techno-organic virus in her body is fading and she will soon die again, says her farewells to Rogue before departing.

In Utopia, Selene's plan leads to the X-Men and X-Force fighting for their lives while the island is consumed by Selene's forces. In order to perform the ritual that would turn her into a goddess, Selene needs the mystical dagger that Eli Bard had previously lost when he was attacked by the spirits of Warpath's deceased tribe, so Selene sends her Inner Circle to Utopia to retrieve it. The Inner Circle teleports back to Genosha, taking an unconscious Warpath with them. Once Bard gives Selene the knife and proclaims his eternal love for her, Selene fatally stabs him. Warpath is eventually rescued by the Vanisher, but Selene absorbs the many souls around her.

Selene gains godlike power, incapacitating sorcerers Doctor Doom, Doctor Strange, and Brother Voodoo in the process. Turning to her followers, she commands them to get her more souls. Meanwhile, Warpath teaches X-Force the Ghost Dance, a ritual he learned from Ghost Rider that is intended to kill evil spirits such as Selene, and they engage in battle against Selene's Inner Circle. During the fight, Thunderbird, Senyaka, and Wither are killed, while both Mortis and Blink are defeated and run away.

Warpath is able to kill Selene by plunging her own dagger into her chest. Shocked that her moment of godhood was taken away so quickly, Selene explodes into rays of light, apparently ending the effect of the corrupted techno-organic virus in the bodies she had revived. X-Force is fractured, with most of its members leaving the team, even though Cyclops states that soon, X-Force will be more necessary than ever.

== Chronological reading order ==
- Necrosha: The Gathering
- X-Necrosha #1
- New Mutants #6
- X-Force #21
- New Mutants #7
- X-Force #22
- New Mutants #8
- X-Force #23
- X-Men: Legacy #231
- X-Men: Legacy #232
- X-Force #24
- X-Men: Legacy #233
- X-Force #25

== Issues involved but not listed ==
- X-Force vol. 3 Annual #1 – between New Mutants #7 and X-Force #22
- Dazzler one-shot – after the end

== Collected editions ==
The story has been collected into a number of trade paperback volumes:

- X-Necrosha (collects X-Force #21–25, New Mutants #6–8, X-Men: Legacy #231–233, and X-Force/New Mutants: Necrosha one-shot, 336 pages, hardcover, July 2010 ISBN 0-7851-4674-1)
- X-Men Legacy: Necrosha (collects X-Men Legacy #231–234, X-Necrosha (X-Men Legacy story), 112 pages, Paperback, March 2012, ISBN 0785162984)
- New Mutants, Volume 2: Necrosha (collects New Mutants #6–11, and X-Force/New Mutants Necrosha one-shot, 160 pages, hardcover, May 2010, ISBN 0-7851-3993-1)
- X-Force, Volume 4: Necrosha (collects X-Force #21–25, 144 pages, paperback, April 2010, ISBN 0-7851-3541-3)
