= Warpath (character) =

- Warpath; Art by Clayton Crain

Publication information
- Publisher: Marvel Comics
- First appearance: New Mutants #16 (June 1984)
- Created by: Chris Claremont (writer); Sal Buscema (artist)

In-story information
- Alter ego: James Jonathan Proudstar
- Species: Human mutant
- Place of origin: Camp Verde, Arizona, United States
- Team affiliations: X-Men; X-Force; Hellions; New Mutants; X-Corporation; Weapon X Weapon X-Force
- Notable aliases: Thunderbird, Running Sun
- Abilities: Trained armed/unarmed combatant; Skilled hunter and tracker; Peak physical condition; Superhuman strength, senses, agility, reflexes/reactions, flexibility, speed, stamina, resilience, and resistance to injury; Regeneration; Flight; Use of a pair of vibranium bowie knives

James Jonathan Proudstar, known first as Thunderbird and then as Warpath, is a character appearing in American comic books published by Marvel Comics, commonly in association with the X-Men. Proudstar first appears as the second Thunderbird in New Mutants #16 (June 1984).

Blaming the X-Men for the death of his brother Thunderbird, Proudstar joins the Hellions, a group of young mutants led by Emma Frost. He later becomes a longtime member of the militant X-Men offshoot X-Force.

Proudstar is an Apache and one of the few Native American superheroes in Marvel Comics. His powers are superhuman strength, speed, and flight.

Warpath appeared in the 2014 film, X-Men: Days of Future Past, portrayed by Booboo Stewart.

== Publication history ==
James Proudstar first appeared as Thunderbird in New Mutants #16 (June 1984), created by writer Chris Claremont and artist Sal Buscema. The character initially appears as an antagonist of the New Mutants and the X-Men, but eventually joins the New Mutants in issue #99 of that series. The character appears regularly as a member of that team for most of the duration of the title.

== Fictional character biography ==
=== Early life ===
James Proudstar was born on the Apache reservation at Camp Verde, Arizona. As a child, he once visited the roadside carnival that employed Chondu the Mystic and that Tabitha Smith also attended and had his fortune read by Destiny. He was targeted by geneticist Edwin Martynec secretly researching radiation mutation who was finally foiled by his brother John Proudstar and his reporter friend.

=== Operating as Thunderbird ===
Seeking revenge for his brother's death while serving in the X-Men, James is recruited for Emma Frost's Hellions. As a Hellion, James clashes with the New Mutants and Kitty Pryde, but to his chagrin, Frost feels they are not ready to take on the adult X-Men. James defies Frost's orders, dons his brother's costume, and kidnaps former X-Man Banshee to draw the team to the Cheyenne Mountain Complex, where John was killed. However, when the opportunity to kill Professor X arrives, James finds he has too many doubts about how John joined the X-Men. James is reconciled with the X-Men; Professor X offers him membership in the New Mutants, but he declines out of loyalty to his friends in the Hellions.

Months later, James leaves the Hellions and returns home to his family's reservation. Cable makes him another offer to join the New Mutants but he turns it down. After a meeting in New York City, James returns home to find his entire tribe murdered. Finding a Hellfire mercenary's mask at the scene, James deduces that Emma Frost committed the act to punish him for leaving the team.

=== Operating as Warpath ===
James joins the New Mutants, hoping to track down the Hellions and gain revenge. The New Mutants cut ties with the X-Men and become the militant adventurers X-Force, and James changes his codename to Warpath. As a member of X-Force, James becomes more calm and controlled and strikes up a close friendship with his teammate Theresa Cassidy. Despite his strong attraction to her, Theresa only sees James as a friend.

Warpath meets Risque, who helps James with his confidence, and the two begin a love affair. However, Risque is being blackmailed by Sledge, and she drugs Warpath and brings him to his lair. Sledge's partner, Vanisher, has disappeared in the Darkforce dimension while teleporting. Sledge reveals to James that his enhanced senses would allow him to survive in the Darkforce dimension without going insane. James locates and rescues the Vanisher, who is being held captive by natives of the Darkforce, and in turn Sledge gives information on one of his tribesman, Michael Whitecloud, whom James had presumed deceased. Whitecloud tells him that Stryfe, X-Force's adversary, was behind the killing of his tribe.

After X-Force's disbanding, Warpath joins the Mumbai branch of the international mutant agency X-Corporation. His new team is a mix of old and new friends: Feral, Sunfire, and Thornn. He stays there for a while, helping to save Professor X's life.

Warpath is one of the few mutants to retain his powers after the events of Decimation. Shortly afterwards, he joins the X-Men at Professor X's request. Warpath and Hepzibah confront one of the X-Mansion's guardian Sentinels when Caliban enters the grounds. Warpath enters the Morlock tunnels along with Hepzibah, Storm, and Caliban, to investigate the Morlocks' increased activity, which has included the capture of X-Men ward Leech. They see Warpath's name written on a Morlock wall, along with the names of the other X-Men. After the Morlock encounter, Hepzibah and Warpath begin a relationship.

Warpath, Hepzibah, and Iceman meet up with Archangel in San Francisco, California. All four are caught in the effects of an illusion, created by Martinique Jason, which has transformed the city into a hippie paradise. Warpath (calling himself Running Sun) and the others are sent by Jason to confront Cyclops and Emma Frost. After Emma breaks through Jason's illusion, Warpath and the others return to normal. They begin to reestablish the X-Men organization in San Francisco.

Warpath is one of the founding members of the new X-Force, Cyclops's covert wetwork team, charged with finding and eliminating Purifier cells. Warpath joins out of a desire for revenge for the death of Caliban at the hands of the Purifiers. During X-Force's encounter with the Purifiers, James comes across Eli Bard attacking X-23; after rescuing her, Bard swears a personal vendetta against him.

James takes a break from duty to make peace with the deaths he has caused and visit his brother's grave. En route, his truck is destroyed by the Demon Bear. He is badly beaten before being rescued by Ghost Rider. After defeating the Demon Bear with the aid of Ghost Rider, he learns that this creature was created when the animal spirits of his people were disturbed. They tell James that Eli Bard has dug up Thunderbird, Caliban, and everyone else buried there.

Warpath is caught up in the Necrosha events when his Blackbird crashes after a lightning strike. Making it to shore, the group encounters a resurrected Pyro and Berzerker. After taking them out, James is confronted by his ex-girlfriend, Risque, where she pleads with him to get away before she is controlled again by the techno-organic virus. He is rescued by Archangel, who informs him this is Eli Bard's doing. They meet up with Cyclops and are confronted by Selene's Inner Circle. During the battle, Eli takes on Warpath, who wants the knife responsible for creating the Demon Bear. James is kidnapped by Selene's Inner Circle and taken to Genosha. There he fights and kills his deceased brother John. With the help of ancient rituals from his tribe and Selene's knife, James stabs Selene in the heart and frees his brother's soul. After the battle, James quits X-Force with Wolverine, claiming that he "has made his peace".

Warpath appears as a target for the newly revamped Weapon X program and is opted to join Old Man Logan's new team.

Warpath is among the mutants residing on Krakoa. After Thunderbird rescues some of his people from Heritage Initiative operatives funded by Orchis, Warpath comes through the Krakoan Gate planted on the Apache reservation and meets his grandmother Lozen.

== Powers and abilities ==
=== Physical characteristics ===
Warpath is 7 feet 2 inches (2.18 m) in height and weighs 350 pounds (160 kg).

=== Physical capabilities ===
Warpath is a mutant who possesses superhuman physical ability in virtually all areas. He possesses superhuman strength, allowing him to easily destroy Sentinels and hold his own against Juggernaut. Warpath possesses superhuman resistance to injury, enough to withstand short-range gunfire, grenade explosions, and direct telekinetic attack from Exodus. He also repairs, and regenerates damaged and destroyed tissue much faster than a normal human.

He possesses superhuman agility and flexibility. He can "move with the grace an Olympic gold-medalist would envy" and "swim with the ease of a porpoise."

Warpath's power of flight was discovered by his one-time mentor and team leader Pete Wisdom, who analyzed his mutation after the High Evolutionary devolved and re-evolved all mutants on Earth. Wisdom forced Warpath to incorporate this ability in his fighting style. This power was ignored for a while, as writer Ed Brubaker did not understand how Warpath's speed and strength would allow it. However, Warpath's fighting style in the Messiah Complex storyline showed his flight powers, and X-Force shows him flying for long distances. Writer Christopher Yost suggested that Warpath felt "rather embarrassed by the whole flying thing."

Warpath's senses – particularly sight, smell, and hearing – are enhanced to levels beyond the capabilities of a normal human. He is able to see with perfect clarity at much greater distances than an ordinary human, even in near-total darkness. His hearing is similarly heightened, enabling him to clearly hear sounds beyond the range of ordinary human hearing and to hear sounds that they can detect but at much greater distances.

After nearly being killed by Reignfire, Warpath experienced an increase in senses and speed that allowed him to perform feats he had previously not been aware he was capable of. For example, he can run at high speeds up to at least 150 kilometres per hour (93 mph) for long distances and quickly climb building walls by digging his hands and feet into the bare concrete. He can even evade weapon fire with rapid reflexes and reactions.

=== Training ===
Warpath is well versed in hand-to-hand combat, which is enhanced by his superhuman reflex/reaction rate and eye/ear-hand/foot coordination. He was trained in unarmed combat under the guidance of Emma Frost. He gained extensive training in the use of the staff by his long-time teammate Shatterstar, whom he eventually matched in a record time of only a dozen tries. He wields a pair of bowie knives composed of vibranium, given to him by Storm, with which he has proved to be highly proficient.

James is also a skilled hunter and tracker in his native Apache tradition.

=== Supernatural capabilities ===
Ghost Rider activated limited Apache shaman abilities within James to help him fight the Demon Bear. He could perceive the creature's wounds and the resulting spirit energy when it was destroyed.

== Reception ==
- In 2014, Entertainment Weekly ranked Thunderbird and Warpath 62nd in their "Let's rank every X-Man ever" list.
- In 2018, CBR.com ranked Warpath 9th in their "X-Force: 20 Powerful Members" list.

== Other versions ==
=== Ultimate Marvel ===
In the Ultimate Comics: X-Men storyline, James Proudstar is a member of the mutant liberation in the Southwest.

=== What If ===
James Proudstar appears in the What If story "What If the X-Men Died on their First Mission?". This version joined the X-Men after Thunderbird and the original X-Men were killed in battle with Krakoa.

== In other media ==
- Warpath appears in X-Men: Days of Future Past, portrayed by Booboo Stewart. This version is a member of the X-Men from a post-apocalyptic, Sentinel-dominated future.
- Warpath appears as a playable character in Marvel: Future Fight.
- Warpath appears in Marvel Snap.
