= Cameron Hodge =

Marvel Comics supervillain

- Cameron Hodge as depicted in Uncanny X-Men #271 (Dec. 1990). Art by Jim Lee.

Publication information
- Publisher: Marvel Comics
- First appearance: X-Factor #1 (February 1986)
- Created by: Bob Layton; Jackson Guice

In-story information
- Species: Human mutate-cyborg
- Team affiliations: Phalanx; The Right; Genoshan Cabinet; X-Factor
- Notable aliases: The Commander
- Abilities: Immortality, Superhuman physical attributes through cybernetic body

Cameron Hodge is a supervillain appearing in American comic books published by Marvel Comics, usually as an adversary in stories featuring the X-Men. Created by writer Bob Layton and artist Jackson Guice, he first appeared as a supporting character in X-Factor #1 (February 1986).

== Publication history ==
Cameron Hodge first appeared in X-Factor #1 (February 1986), and was created by Bob Layton and Jackson Guice. The book was a spinoff of Uncanny X-Men featuring an eponymous team composed of the original five members of the X-Men. Hodge is a founding member of X-Factor and works as the group's public relations agent. Later, under writer Louise Simonson, Hodge was revealed to be secretly acting against X-Factor as the leader of the Right, an anti-mutant terrorist organization. He is decapitated in a confrontation with Angel, but his head is later revealed to have been attached to a large robotic body during the 1990 storyline "X-Tinction Agenda". Hodge is later revealed in a 1993 storyline to have merged with the extraterrestrial cybernetic race known as the Phalanx.

In 1989 an entry for Cameron Hodge was included in the Official Handbook of the Marvel Universe Update '89 #3, a reference book that served as a biographical encyclopedia of Marvel Comics' characters.

== Fictional character biography ==
=== X-Factor and The Right ===
Hodge is a founding member of X-Factor and serves as its public relations agent; he is also the former college roommate of co-founder Warren Worthington III, also known as Angel. Under Hodge's plan, the members of X-Factor contact and teach young mutants while posing as professional mutant hunters.

Hodge is later revealed to have been secretly acting against X-Factor. The company's advertising campaign actually increased anti-mutant hysteria. In addition, the team suffers a series of major setbacks. After being injured by Harpoon during the Mutant Massacre, Angel has his wings amputated, and then seemingly dies in a private jet explosion. X-Factor later discovered that Hodge had orchestrated Angel's amputation and plane accident and had created holograms simulating the Phoenix Force. They also discover that Hodge had secretly been the commander of an anti-mutant terrorist group known as the Right. He had fully intended to exacerbate anti-mutant tensions through his advertising campaign.

Hodge and the Right form a pact with the demon N'astirh. In exchange for collecting mutant babies the Right needed for a spell to open up a portal from Limbo to Earth, N'astirh promises Hodge immortality and the continued existence of the Right. Hodge later kidnaps and kills Candy Southern, Warren's former girlfriend. Warren is revealed to have survived the plane explosion and is transformed into Archangel by Apocalypse. Archangel invades the Right's headquarters and confronts Hodge, decapitating him.

=== "X-Tinction Agenda" ===
During the 1990 crossover storyline "X-Tinction Agenda", Cameron Hodge is revealed to be alive. His severed head has been attached to a large robotic body, a fate Hodge says he survived as a result of his pact with N'astirh. Hodge allies with the government of the island nation Genosha, where mutants are enslaved as obedient servants. Hodge and the Genoshan government launch an attack upon the X-Men, X-Factor, and the New Mutants. During these events, Warlock is killed in the course of Hodge's experiments on him. His captives free themselves and defeat Hodge, whose still-surviving head is buried beneath a collapsed building. In a 1993 storyline, Hodge is revealed to have merged with the Phalanx, a cybernetic alien species.

=== Purifiers ===
Cameron Hodge's remains are found in the Himalayas by a group of Purifiers. He is later revived when Bastion infects him with the transmode virus gained from one of Magus' offspring. At Cypher's behest, Warlock kills Hodge by absorbing his life force.

== Powers and abilities ==
When first revealed to be a villain, Cameron Hodge was the commander of the Right, and had access to all the weaponry and resources of the organization, including a ruby quartz battle suit capable of deflecting Cyclops's optic blasts. The demonic being N'astirh granted Hodge immortality, which allowed his head to survive after being decapitated.

In his cyborg form, he had the ability to become intangible and used various special weapons. His spider/scorpionlike robot body was equipped with tentacles, a powerful stinger, plasma and laser weapons, and a molecular adhesive gun, and could also fire bolas, knives and spears of varying sizes. He also possessed a high degree of invulnerability, enough to protect him from the combined attacks of Storm, Cyclops and Jean Grey. This effect was supposedly augmented by external generators linked to his mainframe computer. When these had been destroyed, Cyclops and Havok could destroy his mechanical body, but not kill him. In addition, in his mechanical body's first appearance, it had a cardboard cutout of a man's suit and body that hung from Hodge's neck, presenting, in his mind, a more normal appearance when his attempt to absorb Warlock's techno-organic abilities had failed.

As part of the Phalanx, he had all their typical abilities, but seemingly lost his magical protection.

== In other media ==
- Cameron Hodge appears in X-Men: The Animated Series, voiced by Stephen Ouimette. Throughout the series, he has served as a lawyer for Beast and ambassador for Genosha. Following an attack by Cable, Hodge loses an arm and a leg. Seeking revenge on mutants, he releases the Phalanx infection before merging himself with the Phalanx's leader to help them assimilate Earth and its inhabitants. However, Hodge is defeated and restored by Beast, Warlock, Forge, Mister Sinister, Amelia Voght, and Magneto.
- Cameron Hodge appears as a boss in X-Men: Destiny, voiced by Keith Ferguson. This version is a member of the Purifiers who wears a suit capable of utilizing mutant powers farmed by the U-Men.
