= Phalanx Covenant =

Marvel Comics storyline

- Cover of X-Factor 106 (Sept 1994), art by Steve Lightle
- Publisher: Marvel Comics
- Publication date: September – October 1994
- Genre: Superhero; Crossover
Title(s)
"Generation Next":
The Uncanny X-Men #316–317
X-Men vol. 2, #36–37
"Life Signs":
Excalibur vol. 1, #82
X-Factor vol. 1, #106
X-Force vol. 1, #38
"Final Sanction":
Cable vol. 2, #16
Wolverine vol. 2, #85
- Main character(s): X-Men; X-Factor; X-Force; Excalibur; Phalanx

Creative team
- Writer(s): (Cable, Wolverine); Larry Hama (Excalibur, The Uncanny X-Men, X-Factor); Scott Lobdell (Excalibur, X-Factor); Todd DeZago (X-Force, X-Men); Fabian Nicieza
- Penciller(s): (Cable); Steve Skroce (Excalibur); Ken Lashley, Steve Epting (The Uncanny X-Men); Joe Madureira (Wolverine); Adam Kubert (X-Factor); Jan Duursema, Roger Cruz (X-Force); Tony Daniel (X-Men); Andy Kubert

"Phalanx Covenant" was a crossover storyline that ran through Marvel Comics' X-Men family of books in September and October 1994. The X-Men themselves only played a minor role in the story.

== Plot ==
The X-Men are attacked by mutant-hating humans who have used a virus derived from Warlock to turn into techno-organic beings themselves. With these powers, the Phalanx are able to change their shape and assimilate organic matter. The Phalanx are also a hive mind and they are programmed to destroy all mutants.

The Phalanx Covenant was told in three separate storylines:

- Generation Next: With the X-Men gone, Banshee, Emma Frost, Jubilee, and Sabretooth have to save the next generation of mutants from Phalanx agents led by Harvest. This storyline also planted the seeds for Marvel's next mutant title, Generation X.
- Life Signs: X-Factor, Excalibur, and X-Force discover that the Phalanx are losing their hive-mind programming and becoming more independent. The rogue Phalanx Douglock takes Forge, Wolfsbane and Cannonball on a mission to prevent the Phalanx Shinar from contacting the alien Phalanx.
- Final Sanction: Cable, Wolverine, Cyclops, and Phoenix reunite to rescue the X-Men by infiltrating the main base of the Phalanx.

== Tie-in issues ==
Generation Next

- Uncanny X-Men #316
- X-Men (Vol. 2) #36
- Uncanny X-Men #317
- X-Men (Vol. 2) #37

Life Signs

- X-Factor #106
- X-Force #38
- Excalibur #82

Final Sanction

- Wolverine (vol. 2) #85
- Cable #16

=== Collected editions ===
The comics were collected into the Origin of Generation X trade paperback, published in 1996. A second printing was published on June 1, 2001 (ISBN 0-7851-0216-7).

=== Related issues ===
- The X-Tinction Agenda: included events that led to the creation of the Phalanx.
- Uncanny X-Men #291: Steven Lang is recruited from an institution to guide the mutant-hating group that will become the Phalanx.
- Uncanny X-Men #305–306, and 312–313: The X-Men battle early Phalanx prototypes and face the real deal for the first time.
- Excalibur #78–80: Douglock joins Excalibur.

== In other media ==
- This storyline was re-imagined by Marvel in illustrated novel form on October 17, 1995.
- "Phalanx Covenant" was adapted into the X-Men: The Animated Series episode of the same name.
