= Warlock (New Mutants) =

Fictional character in Marvel comics

- Warlock in Nova (vol. 4) #11 (May 2008). Art by Paul Pelletier.

Publication information
- Publisher: Marvel Comics
- First appearance: The New Mutants #18 (August 1984)
- Created by: Chris Claremont; Bill Sienkiewicz

In-story information
- Full name: Warlock
- Species: Technarch Mutant
- Place of origin: Kvch
- Team affiliations: New Mutants; Fallen Angels; Phalanx; Excalibur; X-Factor; X-Men; Swordbearers of Krakoa
- Partnerships: Cypher
- Notable aliases: Douglock; Moonlock; Warlox
- Abilities: Shapeshifting; Can turn organic objects and beings into techno-organic matter; Can drain the life energy from techno-organic matter

Warlock is a character appearing in American comic books published by Marvel Comics, primarily in association with the X-Men. Created by Chris Claremont and Bill Sienkiewicz, he first appeared in The New Mutants #18 (August 1984).

A young techno-organic extraterrestrial mutant with a body that can assume any shape and the ability to turn organic matter into techno-organic matter, Warlock originally appeared as a member of the New Mutants in the team's original comic run and has since been featured in its subsequent incarnations and other groups affiliated with the X-Men.

== Publication history ==
Warlock was introduced in The New Mutants #18 (August 1984) and joined the titular team in issue #21 (November 1984). He remained a part of the cast until his death in issue #95 (November 1990). With his extraterrestrial origins and shapeshifting powers, he was commonly used for visual gags and fish-out-of-water humor. Pop culture historian James Van Hise described Warlock's visual impact in a 1987 article: "He looks somewhat like an explosion in the shape of a human body and only a couple artists, such as Art Adams, have been able to capture his essence as well as Sienkiewicz does. His unveiling on page 16 of [The New Mutants] issue 21 is pretty startling and it takes a few issues for the eye to get used to scanning his image just because it's so - alien. Truly alien."

After his resurrection, Warlock joined the cast of Excalibur in issue #78 (June 1994) and then briefly starred in a self-titled nine-issue solo series from 1999 to 2000, written by Louise Simonson. After sparse appearances throughout the early 2000s, he returned to regular publication as a main cast member in New Mutants (vol. 3) (2009–2012), All-New X-Factor (2014–2015), and later New Mutants (vol. 4) (2020–2023).

== Fictional character biography ==
=== Origin ===
Warlock is a Technarch, a race of shapeshifting "techno-organic" organisms that survive by infecting living creatures with the transmode virus before draining their life energy ("lifeglow"). His father, the Magus, is the ruler of the Technarchy. Technarch children customarily battle their parents to the death in order to prove their right to exist. Warlock, however, does not wish to fight his father and, knowing that Magus will fight and likely slay him regardless, flees his home planet of Kvch.

=== New Mutants ===
Fleeing from his home planet and pursued by his father, Warlock crash-lands on Earth near Xavier's School for Gifted Youngsters, so drained of energy that he is near death. He soon comes into contact with the New Mutants. Confused by his new surroundings, he does not understand them or recognize them as sentient lifeforms and instead tries to communicate with the Danger Room's computers, mistaking them for beings like himself. After initially misunderstanding his actions and briefly fighting the young alien, the New Mutants contact Doug Ramsey, a mutant with linguistic powers, to establish communication. Once Warlock realizes his error and explains himself, he joins the team alongside Doug, who takes the code name Cypher.

Learning to speak English, Warlock serves as a member of the original New Mutants for much of their eponymous series and soon becomes best friends with Cypher. His compassion, unusual for his species, leads to him being labeled a mutant in spirit. As a result of his compassionate nature, Warlock refuses to drain other sentient creatures of their lifeglow, though he initially has difficulty determining whether or not a creature is sentient. Team leader Mirage orders him not to drain any large creatures without permission; however, Warlock often drains such creatures at his discretion when she is not present. He also has a distinctive speech pattern common to Technarchs, frequently referring to himself with the personal pronoun "self". Though he initially refers to his teammates with their first names or pronouns, he later begins referring to them as "friends", and eventually as "selffriends". An exception is Mirage who, likely due to her status as team leader, he calls "chiefriend". Cypher, after offering his own life energy to keep Warlock alive during a mission in Asgard, earns the unique honorific title of "selfsoulfriend".

During the team's adventures, Warlock often encapsulates Cypher as a suit of armor, keeping him safe and compensating for Cypher's lack of offensive abilities. Though the two often work together to confront enemies, Warlock's constant protection also erodes Cypher's self-esteem. They later discover they can merge physically and mentally, operating as one entity, though this risks Cypher being infected with Warlock's transmode virus and permanently merging the two.

When the Magus arrives on Earth to duel his son to the death, Warlock and the New Mutants battle him and Cypher manages to reprogram the Magus into an infantile state. The Magus is sent back to Kvch to be raised to adulthood once more.

Warlock briefly leaves the New Mutants and joins the Fallen Angels in their self-titled 1987 miniseries, but rejoins the New Mutants following the series' conclusion. Soon after, Cypher is killed during a battle with the Ani-Mator. His friend's death devastates Warlock and he later steals Cypher's body from its grave in a confused attempt to revive him. With the help of his teammates, he comes to terms with Cypher's death and returns his friend's body to its resting place.

Warlock continues to operate with the New Mutants and is eventually confirmed to indeed be a mutant, indicated by his radically different ideals and personality compared to Technarchs in general. During the 1990–1991 "X-Tinction Agenda" event, he is kidnapped alongside his teammates Rictor, Boom-Boom, and Wolfsbane, and sold into slavery on the island nation of Genosha, ruled by Cameron Hodge. When Hodge attempts to steal his shapeshifting powers, Warlock is drained of energy and reduced to ash. At Wolfsbane's request, his remains are scattered over Cypher's grave.

=== Douglock ===
A techno-organic being with the appearance and memories of Cypher appears in Excalibur as a former member of the Phalanx. Dubbed Douglock, the Phalanx had intended to use him to infiltrate the X-Men before the android Zero freed him of their control. Douglock joins Excalibur and plays a major role in defeating his former masters during the 1994 "Phalanx Covenant" event. Though some of his teammates who had known Cypher in life are initially disturbed by his resemblance to their deceased friend, he is eventually accepted and becomes a valued member of the team, even entering into a romantic relationship with his teammate Wolfsbane. Douglock appears regularly in Excalibur until its conclusion in 1998. After the team disbands, Douglock remains on Muir Island with Wolfsbane and Moira MacTaggert.

=== Return as Warlock ===
In the 1999 storyline "Rage Against the Machine", Douglock is abducted and enslaved by the Red Skull, who seeks to use his transmode virus to take over the world. During the storyline, he is revealed to have been Warlock all along, carrying a copy of Cypher's memories and believing himself to be a new entity. His own memories are restored and Warlock vows to rid Earth of all techno-organic technology. Warlock subsequently stars in his own self-titled series, Warlock (1999–2000), in which he discovers Hope, a young mutant whose transmutation powers allow her to be a carrier of the transmode virus without being affected by it. The two quest for a cure for her and their adventures throughout the series bring them into conflict with the villainous android Bastion and the Magus, regrown to adulthood since his encounter with the New Mutants. Warlock allies with Wolfsbane and the Avengers to defeat Bastion and, with Hope's powers, rewrites his father's DNA into a replica of his own, thus making the Magus partially human. Overwhelmed by his sudden humanity, the Magus is defeated and flees.

=== Annihilation: Conquest ===
Reverting to his original appearance, Warlock later returns to Kvch, finding the only Technarch remaining on the planet, the young Tyro. In the hopes of changing the Technarchy into a more benevolent and peaceful society, Warlock infects Tyro with his less aggressive form of the transmode virus and raises him to value life. During the 2007–2008 "Annihilation: Conquest" event, Nova travels to Kvch in search of a cure for his transmode infection. Warlock represses Nova's infection but is hesitant to join the fight to free the Kree from the Phalanx. Gamora and Drax, also infected with the transmode virus, arrive on Kvch and are transformed by the virus into a Babel Spire, which summons Tyro's father, a Technarch Siredam. During the ensuing battle, Warlock sacrifices all of his lifeglow to completely cure Nova in order for the latter to distract the Siredam long enough for Tyro to escape. Tyro, inspired by this selfless act, defeats his father and takes possession of his body, using the inestimable amount of lifeglow he gains to revive Warlock and cure Gamora and Drax. They agree to join Nova, and Warlock personally battles the Phalanx's leader, Ultron (possessing Adam Warlock). Warlock is able to purge Ultron from Adam Warlock, allowing Quasar to restore the real Adam's soul. Following Ultron's defeat, Warlock, Tyro, and Wraith begin curing the infected Kree.

=== New Mutants Reunion ===
Warlock returns to Earth in New Mutants (vol. 3) #5 (November 2009) and helps free the resurrected Cypher from the influence of Selene during the 2009–2010 "Necrosha" event. He joins the X-Men's New Mutants squad, reuniting with some of his old teammates, and appears regularly in subsequent issues of New Mutants (vol. 3). In the 2010 "Second Coming" event, the New Mutants are sent to engage the Right and Cameron Hodge. During the battle, Cypher convinces Warlock to absorb Hodge's and his soldiers' lifeglow to save their friends from imminent death. Taking sentient lives, however reluctantly, deeply troubles Warlock and he soon after purges the harvested lifeglow. Later, he helps defeat Truefriend, an alternate future version of Cypher who took over the world with Warlock's transmode virus, and saves Tyro from the resurfacing influence of the Siredam.

=== All-New X-Factor ===
Warlock next appears in All-New X-Factor (2014–2015) when the corporate-sponsored X-Factor investigates Techno, Inc., a tech company they discover was founded by Warlock and the Magus. He reveals that following the battle with Truefriend, Warlock secretly put a piece of himself into Cypher to monitor his friend, afraid he may hurt himself in his depression over the possibility of becoming his villainous alternate future self. Soon after, the Magus reached out to Warlock to make amends and to seek his aid in helping the Technarchy recover from a lethal virus that has devastated their species, reducing the population to only 10%. Reconciling, they established a base on Earth, disguising it as Techno, Inc. Following their discovery, Warlock decides to join X-Factor and amicably parts ways with his father. During his tenure with X-Factor, Warlock develops a crush on and later has a relationship with his robotic teammate Danger, eventually sharing a piece of his soul with her. After the team disbands, the two of them part ways.

=== Civil War II ===
In New Avengers (vol. 4) during the 2016–2017 "Civil War II" event, Warlock works with Sunspot's A.I.M. and helps trap and defeat the Maker.

=== Dead Souls and Uncanny X-Men ===
In the 2018 limited series The New Mutants: Dead Souls, Warlock becomes ill and isolates himself in an abandoned cabin in Canterbury, Connecticut. He later inadvertently frightens a young mutant with explosive powers and as a result is seemingly killed. The mutant is infected with Warlock's transmode virus and subsequently loses control of his powers, causing a massive explosion which kills himself and his mother. Mirage is sent to investigate the explosion and comes into contact with Warlock's ashes. In a desperate and confused attempt for survival, Warlock, still sick and unable to control his transmode virus, merges with her, forming the gestalt entity Moonlock. Moonlock goes on to infect Magik's New Mutants team, including Magik herself, Wolfsbane, Strong Guy, and later Karma. Moonlock and the infected mutants are all captured by the Office of National Emergency (O*N*E) and forced into service as Sentinel-like mutant hunters and killers.

Moonlock and the others are eventually rescued by the X-Men in Uncanny X-Men (vol. 5) (2019). Beast determines that the virus is Warlock himself, spreading himself over many hosts so he does not completely drain one person. He convinces Warlock to reform and fully merge with one of Jamie Madrox's duplicates, curing Mirage and the New Mutants of their infections. This new entity, dubbed Warlox, joins the X-Men in battling O*N*E and sacrifices himself to disable their techno-organic Sentinels.

=== Krakoan Age ===
After returning to life through unknown means and reconnecting with Cypher, Warlock appears in House of X (2019). In order to sustain the sentient island of Krakoa (which survives by draining the life forces of others) in the short-term while mutants build their own nation upon it, Warlock partially merges with it, feeding on the organic life of the island. As Warlock feeds on the island's organic matter, Krakoa in turn feeds on Warlock. As more mutants move to Krakoa, Warlock is fed upon less and less. Additionally, Warlock's integration with the island makes him aware of everything that happens on it, acting as a surveillance system that Cypher, distrustful of Professor X, monitors. All of this is kept secret from everyone else on the island, with Cypher claiming that they have merged and Warlock is unable to leave Cypher's body, his presence noted by a techno-organic sleeve on Cypher's right arm.

With Cypher, Warlock rejoins the New Mutants on Krakoa and regularly appears alongside him throughout New Mutants (vol. 4), as well as in various other X-Men titles published during the Krakoan Age. During the 2020–2021 "X of Swords" event, his independent presence on Krakoa is revealed (though the extent of how deeply his systems run through the island remains a secret) and he takes the form of a blade to serve as Cypher's "sword" in the tournament. After Cypher marries Bei the Blood Moon during the tournament, Warlock initially struggles with this change and fears he will lose his relationship with his closest friend, but after some counseling from the other New Mutants, he happily settles into a new dynamic with Cypher and Bei.

Warlock appears throughout Legion of X (2022–2023). He learns that the Magus has been killed by the time-travelling Sentinel Nimrod and is saddened by his father's death. Nimrod later infects and possesses Warlock and uses his connection with Krakoa to create organic Sentinels to wreak havoc on the island's population. To save Krakoa, Cypher is forced to disable Warlock, seemingly killing him. Warlock's soul is later revealed to be alive within Nimrod.

In Uncanny Spider-Man (2023–2024), Warlock is shown to have been extracted from Nimrod and imprisoned by the anti-mutant terrorist group Orchis, who are using his transmode virus for their own ends. He is freed from captivity by Creepy Crawler and cures all those infected by his virus.

=== From the Ashes ===
In the conclusion of the limited series X-Men: Heir of Apocalypse (2024), Warlock appears with Bei the Blood Moon to witness Cypher's transformation into Revelation, the heir of Apocalypse.

== Powers and abilities ==
As a Technarch, Warlock possesses the ability to shapeshift his techno-organic body into any form he desires, including changing color. He is even capable of adopting a human form. He can infect organic matter with his transmode virus, thereby transforming it into techno-organic matter, and drain it of its life energy or "lifeglow" to sustain himself. Conversely, he can cure organic matter of the transmode virus by sacrificing some of his own lifeglow reserves. Depending on the progression of the infection, curing it may require more lifeglow than he can spare without draining himself completely. Warlock is also able to physically and mentally merge with other sentient beings, though repeated merges risk the other party being infected with his transmode virus and permanently fusing them. His status as a mutant has less to do with his abilities (which are natural for his species) and more with his compassionate nature and differing ideals compared to the Technarchy as a whole.

Warlock's transmode virus is less aggressive than that of other Technarchs, as shown when he calmed the violent instincts of a Technarch child by infecting him with his virus. As a techno-organic being, Warlock can interface with and influence technology, including other robots like Ultron and Danger. His physiology also makes him difficult to permanently kill, as he has been completely drained of lifeglow, fatally wounded, and reduced to ash, but has returned to life through various means, including by being supplied with lifeglow and possessing a host.

Warlock can survive in the vacuum of outer space and enter hyperspace to travel through it at high speeds. He also possesses great strength and a variety of sensors which enable him to perceive things normal humans cannot. As he is yet an immature Technarch, his powers may possibly grow stronger with age and rival those of his father, the Magus.

During his time as Douglock, Warlock manifested Cypher's linguistic powers, a result of maintaining a copy of Cypher's memories and personality in himself. These abilities have not been demonstrated following his appearances in Warlock (1999–2000).

== Other versions ==
=== Age of Revelation ===
In a potential future depicted in "Age of Revelation", Cypher sacrifices Warlock to create the mutagenic X-Virus. He intends to use the virus to assimilate himself and everyone affected by the virus into the Earth, becoming a living planet.

=== Exiles ===
An alternate universe version of Warlock who fused with Cypher after he was infected with the Legacy Virus appears in Exiles #20 (February 2003).

=== Marvel Zombies ===
An alternate universe version of Warlock appears in Marvel Zombies: Resurrection (vol. 2) (2020–2021), in which he constructs a techno-organic body to house Franklin Richards' consciousness after he is bitten by his zombified mother. Warlock later dies under unknown circumstances.

=== Truefriend ===
An alternate timeline version of Warlock appears in New Mutants (vol. 3) (2012). This version permanently merges with Cypher, who subsequently kills Warlock and uses his transmode virus to take over the world, becoming known as Truefriend. The New Mutants of the mainstream continuity defeat Truefriend and prevent this future from ever coming to pass.

=== Ultimate Marvel ===
An alternate universe version of Warlock makes a non-speaking cameo appearance in Ultimate X-Men #58 (June 2005). This version attacks New Jersey for unknown reasons and is contained by the X-Men.

== In other media ==
=== Television ===
Warlock appears in the X-Men: The Animated Series episode "Phalanx Covenant", voiced by David Corban. This version is a member of the Phalanx who comes to Earth with his unnamed "life mate" (voiced by Susan Roman) to avoid merging with the Phalanx's leader, the Nexus. After his life mate is captured by Cameron Hodge and possessed by the Nexus, Warlock works with the X-Men to free her and stop the Phalanx from assimilating Earth. The two return to their home planet to free the rest of the Phalanx from the Nexus.

=== Film ===
Warlock was intended to appear in The New Mutants as a member of the eponymous team, with Sacha Baron Cohen being considered for the role.

=== Video games ===
Warlock appears as a playable character in Marvel: Contest of Champions.

=== Merchandise ===
Warlock was featured as the Build-a-Figure in the spring 2017 X-Men wave of Marvel Legends action figures.
