= Magus (Marvel Comics) =

Publication information
- Publisher: Marvel Comics
- First appearance: New Mutants #18 (August 1984)
- Created by: Chris Claremont; Bill Sienkiewicz

In-story information
- Alter ego: Magus
- Team affiliations: Technarchy
- Abilities: Techno-organic being; Shape-shifting; Superhuman strength; Flight

The Magus (/ˈmeɪɡəs/) is a fictional character appearing in American comic books published by Marvel Comics. He is a techno-organic patriarch of an alien civilization. He is typically depicted as an antagonist to the X-Men and their associated teams, such as the New Mutants and X-Force.

== Publication history ==
Magus first appeared in the New Mutants #18-19 (August–September 1984). He was created by writer Chris Claremont and artist Bill Sienkiewicz. The character and his son, the New Mutant, Warlock, were intended as an homage to Jim Starlin's characters: Adam Warlock and his evil alter ego Magus.

The character subsequently appeared in The Uncanny X-Men #192 (April 1985), and The New Mutants #46-47 (December 1986-January 1987), and #50 (April 1987). The character did not appear again for many years, until Warlock #7-9 (April–June 2000), and X-Force #2 (May 2008).

Magus received an entry in the Official Handbook of the Marvel Universe Deluxe Edition #8.

== Fictional character biography ==
Magus is the ruler of the extraterrestrial Technarchy. After his son Warlock refuses to obey a custom that would have made him kill his father and flees to Earth, Magus follows Warlock, arriving on Earth within a meteorite that lands near the X-Mansion. After being beaten by Colossus, Nightcrawler, and Rogue, Magus remains on Earth and poses as a human to spy on the mansion. Magus does battle with Warlock and the New Mutants, resulting in him being returned to his home planet.

Deep in space, Magus meets the New Mutants again. Cypher fuses with Warlock, allowing him to rewrite Magus's genetic code and regress him to an infant state. Magus later returns to normal and seeks out his son. He confronts the entity Douglock, an apparent amalgamation of Warlock and Cypher, and flees after being repelled by Douglock and Hope.

It is later revealed that, before Magus left Earth, he had placed an offspring underwater. This offspring is found by members of the Purifiers, who use it to resurrect Bolivar Trask, Cameron Hodge, Stephen Lang, Graydon Creed, and William Stryker by infecting them with the Technarch virus.

=== Techno, Inc ===
The All-New X-Factor, a private super-team handpicked by Harrison Snow, discover that Magus is alive and has become the head of a rival corporation, with Warlock by his side. With the help of Cypher, X-Factor confronts Magus. Magus reveals that, following his fight with Warlock, he was infected with a virus that devastated the Technarchy. Magus decides to make amends with his son, setting aside the race's genetic disposition of father killing son so that they can live in harmony.

In the series Legion of X, Magus is revealed to have been killed by Nimrod. Blindfold learns of Magus's death after encountering a psychic imprint of him in the astral plane and relays this information to Legion, who informs Warlock and Cypher.

== Powers and abilities ==
Magus is a techno-organic entity, a creature composed entirely of living circuitry. Like all others of his kind, his powers include shapeshifting, super strength, starflight, the ability to mimic and interface with any technological artifact, and the ability to transform any organic life-form into a techno-organic being like himself via the infectious Transmode Virus. Though able to draw energy from a variety of ambient and artificial sources, transforming living beings and draining them of their life energy seems to be his preferred means of sustenance. His size and strength are limited only by the amount of power he can acquire and store.

Magus has also demonstrated a high level of intelligence and cunning. Magus also possesses the ability of interdimensional transportation, allowing him to enter Limbo under his own power.

== Other versions ==
An alternate universe version of Magus from Earth-928 appears in 2099: World of Tomorrow.
