= All-New X-Factor =

Marvel comic book

Publication information
- Publisher: Marvel Comics
- Schedule: Twice Monthly
- Format: Ongoing series
- Genre: Superhero
- Publication date: March 2014 – March 2015
- No. of issues: 20
- Main character(s): Polaris; Gambit; Quicksilver; Danger; Warlock; Cypher

Creative team
- Written by: Peter David
- Artist(s): Carmine Di Giandomenico; Pop Mhan (#13)
- Letterer(s): Cory Petit; VC's Cory Petit (#14)
- Colorist: Lee Loughridge
- Editor(s): Jordan D. White (#1-#14); Katie Kubert (#15-#20); Mike Marts (#18); Xander Jarowey (#20)

Collected editions
- Not Brand X: ISBN 978-0785188162
- Change of Decay: ISBN 978-0785188179
- AXIS: ISBN 978-0785188186

All-New X-Factor was an ongoing comic book series published by Marvel Comics which debuted in January 2014, as part of the All-New Marvel NOW! event and a relaunch of X-Factor.

== Publication history ==
Focusing on a new iteration of the X-Factor superhero team, the series is written by Peter David and is a follow-up to his previous book, X-Factor vol. 2, whose incarnation of X-Factor was a private investigation company. The opening storyline, which continues events from issue #260 of the previous series, sees a return to the corporate-sponsored version of the team that was the initial concept when the first version of X-Factor debuted in 1986, and initially featured six team members; Polaris, Quicksilver, Gambit, Danger, Warlock and Cypher. All New X-Factor was cancelled after 20 issues due to low sales.

== Critical reception ==
Peter David's writing of Quicksilver earned the character a 2014 @ssie award from Ain't It Cool News. AICN's Matt Adler commented that David writes the character best, and that the "arrogant, impatient speedster" made the title worth following.

== Collected editions ==
| Vol | Title | Material collected | Pages | Publication date | ISBN |
|---|---|---|---|---|---|
| 1 | Not Brand X | All-New X-Factor #1-6 | 136 | July 1, 2014 | 978-0785188162 |
| 2 | Change of Decay | All-New X-Factor #7-12 | 136 | October 28, 2014 | 978-0785188179 |
| 3 | Axis | All-New X-Factor #13-20 | 176 | March 31, 2015 | 978-0785188186 |
