= Genosha =

Island nation in comics published by Marvel Comics

- Marvel Comics location
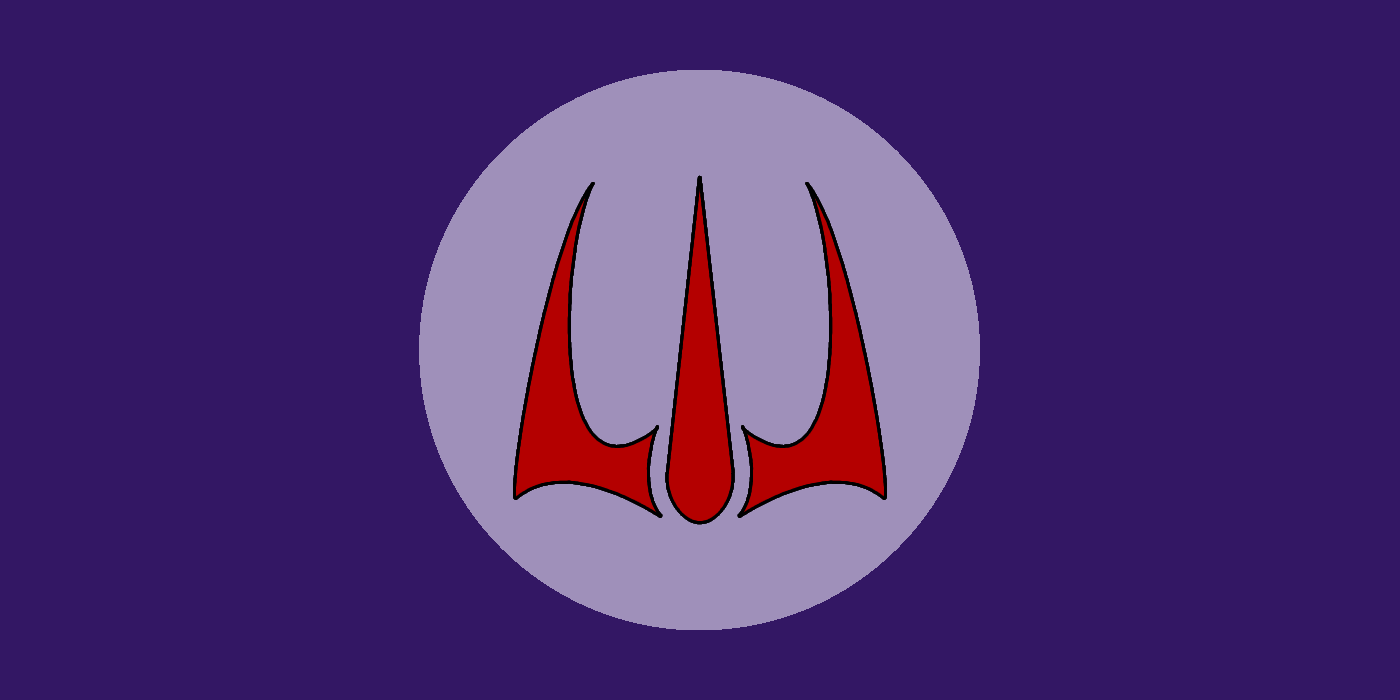
- Flag of Genosha
- First appearance: The Uncanny X-Men #235 (October 1988)
- Created by: Chris Claremont; Rick Leonardi

In-universe information
- Type: African country
- Races: Humans, Mutants
- Locations: Hammer Bay, Ridgeback Mountains, Carrion Cave
- Character: Genoshans

Genosha (/dʒəˈnoʊʃə, ɡəˈ-/ jə-NOH-shə, gə-) is a fictional country appearing in American comic books published by Marvel Comics. It is an island nation that exists in the Marvel Universe and a prominent location in the X-Men comics. The fictional nation served as an allegory for slavery and later for South African apartheid before becoming a mutant homeland and subsequently a disaster zone. The island is located off the southeastern African coast southwest from Seychelles and northeast of Madagascar. Its capital city was Hammer Bay.

== Publication history ==
Genosha, a significant location in the Marvel Universe, first appeared in Uncanny X-Men #235 in 1988. The island nation was created by Rick Leonardi and Chris Claremont, who used it as an allegory for apartheid-era South Africa, portraying a society where mutants were subjugated and transformed into mindless "mutates" by a brutal regime led by the Genegineer, David Moreau. This portrayal of Genosha highlighted issues of oppression and exploitation, resonating with themes of racial and social injustice.

Initially depicted as a paradise with a dark underbelly, Genosha was ruled by a government that treated mutants as second-class citizens, exploiting them as slave labor. The nation's early stories drew parallels to real-world issues of apartheid, reflecting Claremont's intention to use the X-Men comics as a platform for exploring complex social and political issues. The island's story evolved dramatically over time. In Uncanny X-Men #255 (1989), the depiction of Genosha expanded to show the nation descending into civil war, with mutants and "normal" humans locked in a violent conflict, reminiscent of the ethnic conflicts in Bosnia during the 1990s. This civil war storyline deepened Genosha's role in the X-Men mythos as a symbol of the broader struggles faced by mutants.

Magneto, the X-Men's long-time adversary, was later granted control of Genosha by the United Nations in an attempt to deter him from further aggression against humanity. Under Magneto's rule, the island became a sanctuary for mutants, but this was short-lived. In New X-Men #115 (2001), Cassandra Nova, the evil twin of Charles Xavier, unleashed a devastating Sentinel attack on Genosha, wiping out most of its population.

== Fictional country history ==
=== Mutant apartheid ===
Genosha is located off the east coast of Africa, to the north of Madagascar, and boasted a high standard of living, developed economy, and freedom from the political and racial turmoil that characterized neighboring nations. However, Genosha's prosperity was built upon the enslavement of its mutant population. Mutants in Genosha were the property of the state and children who were positively identified with the mutant gene were put through a process developed by David Moreau, commonly known as the Genegineer, stripped of free will and made into "mutates" (a term for those who gained superpowers from external sources rather than possessing them innately). The Genegineer was also capable of modifying certain mutant abilities to fulfill specific labor shortages. Citizenship in Genosha is permanent and the government does not recognize any emigration. Citizens who attempt to leave the country are tracked down and forcibly brought back to the island by the Press Gang, consisting of Hawkshaw, Pipeline, Punchout, and Wipeout. Mutant problems are handled by a special group known as the Magistrates.

In the X-Tinction Agenda storyline, the X-Men and their allies rescue their teammates Storm, Meltdown, Rictor and Wolfsbane from Genoshan brainwashing, toppling the government after discovering their alliance with former X-Factor ally turned mutant hater, Cameron Hodge, and that Havok was one of the Magistrates since having his memory wiped by the Siege Perilous. Havok, woken from his conditioning by his brother Cyclops, kills Hodge.

=== Conflict and Magneto's reign ===
A new Genoshan regime that promises better treatment of mutants is put in place after Cameron Hodge's death. There follows a period of general turmoil and a number of attacks by superhumans, including Magneto's Acolytes who are unwilling to forgive the former Genoshan government for its crimes against mutants. X-Factor returns to Genosha to help restore peace between its government and a rogue group of superpowered beings who fled the island.

The United Nations cede control of Genosha to Magneto after he demands to establish a mutant nation. Magneto and his Acolytes reestablish a modicum of peace and stability until civil war breaks out between him and the remaining humans on the island, led by the Magistrates. Magneto eventually defeats the Magistrates and restores order to the island.

Genosha had a population of sixteen million mutants and a stable, advanced society. However, the entire island was reduced to rubble and its mutant population murdered by Cassandra Nova's Sentinels. There were few survivors, many having been evacuated.

=== Xavier's leadership ===
Magneto and Charles Xavier join forces to rebuild Genosha, as detailed in the series Excalibur vol. 3 (2004). This goes badly as foreign military forces have thrown up a cordon around the island; no one is allowed to enter or leave. A few survivors and mutants who wish to help with the rebuilding process remain on the island, including Callisto, Freakshow, and Wicked.

=== Necrosha and beyond ===
During the 2009 event Necrosha, Selene travels to Genosha, having been led there by Blink and Caliban. She uses the Technarch virus to resurrect the millions who died in Cassandra Nova's attack. Selene is eventually defeated and killed, thus ending the effect of the corrupted Techno-organic virus in the bodies she revived and returning Genosha to an empty land.

At the end of the Krakoan Age, Krakoa is transported to the White Hot Room. There, the Five resurrect all of the mutants who died in the destruction of Genosha over the course of fifteen years. On Earth, Genosha is acquired by billionaire Ethan Farthing, who establishes Gigosha - a republic run by a supercomputer.

== Other versions ==
- A prison inspired by Guantánamo Bay called "Genosha Bay" appears in the Marvel Noir story X-Men Noir: Mark of Cain #1. Originally founded by Quaker missionaries who sought to isolate their prisoners from each other so they could contemplate their sins, Genosha Bay would eventually become an extraterritorial United States prison infamous for holding notorious international prisoners and employing inhumane punishments, such as sleep deprivation and water torture. By the 1930s, the U.S. government secretly began recruiting prisoners to serve as government operatives while using the cover of a public judiciary meeting meant to close it being held up by lawmakers unwilling to release its most dangerous prisoners to obscure their true intentions.
- An alternate universe iteration of Genosha appears in stories set in the Ultimate Marvel imprint. This version of the island is located south of Madagascar near Krakoa and controlled by Mojo Adams. Additionally, its primary export is television programs such as Hunt for Justice while mutants are treated as second-class citizens after Longshot murdered government minister Lord Joseph Scheele.

== In other media ==
=== Television ===
- Genosha appears in X-Men: The Animated Series as the creation of Bolivar Trask, Cameron Hodge, Henry Peter Gyrich, and a government official known as "the Leader", who advertise the island as a mutant paradise so they can capture mutants, outfit them with power-negating collars, and use them as slave labor to build Sentinels. Eventually, Cable, the X-Men, Magneto, and his Acolytes free the slaves and destroy the Sentinels.
  - Genosha appears in the sequel series X-Men '97, with Madelyne Pryor, Banshee, Moira MacTaggert, Callisto, Emma Frost, Sebastian Shaw, and Nightcrawler appearing as the country's ruling council. Genosha is later destroyed by Wild Sentinels sent by Bastion. In the episode "Danger.exe", Charles Xavier establishes X-Corp on Genosha.
- Genosha appears in Wolverine and the X-Men. This version of the island is ruled over by Magneto, who received it from Senator Robert Kelly, and is open to all mutants. While he promises sanctuary, Magneto secretly and unfairly imprisons dissenters and rule breakers. In a possible future depicted in the episode "Badlands", Genosha was destroyed by the Phoenix Force, with Polaris as the sole survivor.

=== Film ===
- Genosha appears in X-Men (2000) as an uncharted island where Magneto and his Brotherhood have established a base for themselves.
- Genosha appears in Dark Phoenix as a mutant refuge run by Magneto, which he received from the U.S. government.

=== Video games ===
- Genoshan Sentinel mines appear in Spider-Man and the X-Men in Arcade's Revenge via Cyclops' levels.
- Genosha appears in X-Men: Mutant Apocalypse as a prison run by Apocalypse.
- Genosha appears as a stage in X-Men: Children of the Atom.
- Genosha makes a cameo appearance in X-Men: Next Dimension.
- Genosha appears in X-Men Legends II: Rise of Apocalypse, in which it is attacked by Apocalypse's forces.
- Genosha appears in Deadpool, in which it was abandoned sometime prior before Mister Sinister took over to use it as a repository of mutant genetic material for his experiments.

=== Music ===
- Genosha serves as the namesake for Genosha Recordings, an experimental hardcore/gabber/darkcore label run by The Outside Agency.
- A song named after Genosha appears in Judgement Day's album, Peacocks/Pink Monsters.

=== Miscellaneous ===
Genosha has been compared to the Confederate States of America in an article by The Atlantic.
