= Phalanx (comics) =

Fictional extraterrestrial species in Marvel Comics

- The Phalanx. Art by Mike Perkins.

Publication information
- Publisher: Marvel Comics
- First appearance: Uncanny X-Men #305 (April 1994)
- Created by: Scott Lobdell; Joe Madureira; Chris Claremont; Bill Sienkiewicz

Characteristics
- Inherent abilities: Transforms sentient beings into techno-organic lifeforms and assimilates them into its collective. Superhuman strength, stamina, and durability, teleportation, shapeshifting

The Phalanx are a fictional cybernetic species appearing in American comic books published by Marvel Comics. They have come into conflict with the X-Men as well as other groups on several occasions. They form a hive mind, linking each member by a telepathic system.

== Publication history ==
The Phalanx were co-created by writer Scott Lobdell and artist Joe Madureira but owe much in concept and appearance to the original Technarchy by writer Chris Claremont and artist Bill Sienkiewicz. Appearing in prototype variations in earlier issues, the Phalanx are featured in Uncanny X-Men #312 (May 1994).

== Fictional history ==
=== Origins ===
The Phalanx are believed to have been created by the Titans, a group of advanced disembodied consciousnesses so vast and dense, that they have caved in on their own combined intelligence to form black holes. These black holes form realms that exist outside normal space-time, where the Phalanx dwell.

The Phalanx wield advanced ships and use techno-organic viruses to create drones and infect civilizations. The virus compels its victims to build a "Babel Spire" to attract the Technarchy, who consume the planet. If the Phalanx find the society worthy or of great interest to them, they assimilate its members into their hive mind.

=== Phalanx on Earth ===
The Phalanx on Earth are initially formed by a group of human mutant haters who voluntarily infected themselves with the Transmode virus, taken from the remains of the renegade Technarch Warlock. However, the Phalanx's initial attempt to assimilate mutants into its collective is thwarted by the natural resistance of mutants to the Transmode virus. In a scheme to subvert the X-Men's mutant genome knowledge base, Phalanx attacks the X-Mansion, kidnaps most of the X-Men, and replaces them with disguised Phalanx members. While Banshee's group and Synch scramble to save the Phalanx's young mutant captives, they are followed closely by the Phalanx. The group saves all the targeted new mutants except for Blink, who sacrifices herself to save the rest and kill their captor, Harvest. The rest of these young mutants become the core of Generation X, tutored by Banshee and Emma Frost.

=== The Shi'ar Massacre ===
Another group of Phalanx nearly decimate the Shi'ar empire in the absence of the Imperial Guard. These versions have dark coloration and consider themselves "pure" Phalanx.

=== Annihilation: Conquest ===
The Phalanx infect the Kree's defensive network, surrounding the Kree empire in an energy barrier. The Kree who escape the Phalanx's control fight back against their oppressors, only to discover that they are controlled by Ultron.

== Powers and abilities ==
The Phalanx exhibit a hive mind reminiscent of insects. Although individual members retain memories and some aspects of their personalities from before assimilation, they are typically unable to act against the collective will without first being disconnected from the group consciousness.

Phalanx can infect other organisms with the transmode virus with any physical contact - the only known exception being mutants, who possess a degree of immunity to the transmode virus.

Phalanx are able to shapeshift and teleport, but cannot grow in size and mass without absorbing external matter. Over time, they can adapt to attacks used against them.

== Other versions ==
=== Cable ===
In an alternate reality, the Phalanx has overrun Earth, assimilating every lifeform. The mutant Cable serves as its central consciousness.

=== Exiles ===
In the series Exiles, the titular group visits a world infested by a mutated version of the Phalanx. On this world, Cypher fell ill with the Legacy Virus and in an act of desperation Warlock infected him with the transmode virus to save his life. The two viruses combine into a deadly plague that transforms most of Earth's population into Phalanx drones, calling themselves the Vi-Locks. The group is led by Forge, whose innate understanding of machinery made him a prime candidate for leadership. Morph eventually contacts the Asgardians, whose divine blood heals the infected via a transfusion.

=== Marvel 2099 ===
In the possible future of 2099, the Phalanx attempt to invade Earth a second time.

== In other media ==
=== Television ===
- The Phalanx appear in the X-Men: The Animated Series episode "Phalanx Covenant".
- The Phalanx appear in the Ultimate Spider-Man episode "Home Sick Hulk".

=== Video games ===
The Phalanx appear in X-Men 2: Clone Wars.
