= Selene (comics) =

Marvel Comics fictional character

Publication information
- Publisher: Marvel Comics
- First appearance: The New Mutants #9 (November 1983)
- Created by: Chris Claremont (writer); Sal Buscema (artist)

In-story information
- Alter ego: Selene Gallio
- Species: Human mutant
- Team affiliations: Hellfire Club; Externals; Sisterhood of Mutants; Power Elite
- Partnerships: Eli Bard; Wither; Mortis; Senyaka; Blink
- Notable aliases: Black Queen; Black Priestess; Dark Huntress; Moon Goddess
- Abilities: Superhuman strength, endurance, speed, and reflexes; Animation and control of fire and non-living materials; Ability to drain the life force of other beings; Immortality; Telekinesis; Telepathy; Extensive magical knowledge

Selene Gallio is a supervillain appearing in American comic books published by Marvel Comics. Created by Chris Claremont and Sal Buscema, the character first appeared in The New Mutants #9 (November 1983). Selene belongs to the subspecies of humans called mutants, who are born with superhuman abilities. She is often associated with the Hellfire Club's Inner Circle and is despised as an enemy of the X-Men.

Selene was portrayed by Kota Eberhardt in the 20th Century Fox X-Men film Dark Phoenix (2019).

== Publication history ==
Selene first appeared in The New Mutants #9 (November 1983), written by Chris Claremont and illustrated by Sal Buscema.

== Fictional character biography ==
Selene is thousands of years old and functionally immortal, with her millennia-long life attributed to her ability to drain the life essence from other beings to extend her own existence indefinitely. Claiming to have already been old when modern mankind was just emerging, Selene was born over 17,000 years ago, somewhere in what is now Central Europe. Her tribe's elders recognized her for what she was and commanded the entire tribe, including her own mother, to sacrifice their lives to feed her.

=== Rome and Eliphas ===
Selene came to reside in Rome during the height of its empire. She approached Eliphas, a well-respected senator whose wife had left for a general named Mascius. Selene offered Eliphas immortality in exchange for helping her kill and absorb every soul in Rome. Eliphas went about drawing pentagrams and performing rituals at several locations in the city, but warned a small girl to get her family out. The girl's father alerted the authorities and Eliphas and Selene were captured before the spell could be carried out. Just before they were burned at the stake Selene killed the guards. She then cursed Eliphas for the perceived betrayal with an eternal life of torture, transforming Eliphas into a vampire-like creature.

=== Nova Roma ===
Selene is trapped for centuries in the Amazon in the Romanesque town of Nova Roma. She is worshipped as a goddess and worked to maintain the isolation of the town so she could maintain control. Eliphas, now known as Eli Bard, locates Selene in Nova Roma. Still in love with her despite her curse, Bard realizes of having to make an offering to her before approaching her. She also was able to marry several times and have descendants, including Amara Aquilla. Selene attempts to kill Amara by knocking her into a lava pool, which activates Amara's latent mutant ability to manipulate fire and earth. Amara goes on to join the New Mutants as Magma.

=== Becoming the Black Queen ===
After escaping from Nova Roma, Selene makes her way to New York City. With help from Friedrich von Roehm, Selene contacts the Hellfire Club and forces the group to take her in as their Black Queen. Selene intends to become the sole leader of the Hellfire Club, which results in Sebastian Shaw and Emma Frost conspiring to kill Selene by manipulating and training the young mutant Firestar to assassinate her. This fails when Firestar realizes their plan.

In the series The New Warriors, it is revealed that Nova Roma was created by Selene several decades prior. In a desperate bid to relive happier days in which she lived in ancient Rome, Selene arranged for hundreds of people to be kidnapped and taken to the jungles of the Amazon, to a city constructed per her designs. There, she was able to brainwash her prisoners to believe themselves descendants of ancient Romans living in the Amazon, with Magma being among her victims. The city is ultimately disbanded and the residents returned to their regular lives.

Selene plots to destroy the Hellfire Club by gathering an army of young mutants with help from the Gamesmaster. Under her authority, the Upstarts engage in a killing spree that will lead to them being granted a prize, described as "being the next best thing to immortality" by the Gamemaster. Selene is betrayed by Trevor Fitzroy and kept in a torture device that repeatedly rips her flesh from her body. Selene is later freed by Amanda Sefton, though the torture has left her weak and scarred.

Selene returns to the Hellfire Club after striking a deal with the demon Blackheart and seemingly throwing out the rest of the Inner Circle. She offers Sunspot the position of Black Rook, which the latter initially refused but then accepted when Selene and Blackheart revealed that doing so would allow them to resurrect Juliana Sandoval, the girl who died saving Sunspot's life when the latter first joined the New Mutants. Sunspot is forced to accept and become Selene's protégé.

Following Sebastian Shaw's return to the Hellfire Club, Selene is trapped inside the catacombs under the Hellfire Club's base. However, she gains limited mobility from an alliance with Donald Pierce. When the X-Men and Rachel Summers arrive, Selene plots to use Rachel to completely free herself. She follows Rachel to Hong Kong via a transport portal and saves her from being corrupted by a telepathic agent of Courtney Ross who was trying to become the next White Queen. Rachel overpowers Selene and expels her, returning her to her prison.

=== After M-Day ===
Selene is one of the few mutants to retain her powers after the events of M-Day. Selene, disguised as an old woman, befriends Wither and encourages him to embrace his power to decay anything he touches. Selene is later attacked by the police and manages to kill two of them before being shot multiple times. Wither arrives and kills the other two officers, only for Selene to drop her disguise, telling him she is immortal and that they should be together. She tells Wither that she will be his queen if he agrees, then kisses him, which he consents to.

=== Eli Bard's offering ===
Selene's relationship with Eli Bard is explained by Warpath to the other members of X-Force. It is revealed he had originally planned to sacrifice the Purifiers to Selene, but changed his plans upon seeing Bastion reprogram an offspring of Magus. Using the transmode virus, he reanimated the corpses in the burial grounds of the Apache tribe that he had destroyed decades earlier along with Caliban. He presented them to Selene for the purpose of finding other dead mutants and resurrecting them by the same means, so that Bard can sacrifice them and their powers to her.

=== Necrosha ===
Selene returns to the place of her birth in central Europe, accompanied by a new Inner Circle, consisting of Blink, Senyaka, Mortis, Wither, and Eli Bard. She sets her plan into motion of becoming a goddess with the Inner Circle; they go to the New York branch of the Hellfire Club, where they kill everyone present. Caliban leads Selene to the ruins of Genosha which are dubbed "Necrosha" by Selene and swears that her journey will end here. While most of the resurrected mutants attack the X-Men and Utopia, Selene is seen with Bard resurrecting the massacred residents of Genosha, with Cerebro detecting the rise of mutant numbers in millions. Warpath destroys Selene by plunging his dagger into her chest, causing her to explode into light.

=== Return ===
It is later revealed that Selene's body and soul had been preserved as airborne particles and stored in stasis in a vault somewhere in New York City. Lady Deathstrike and Enchantress gain access to the vault and resurrect Selene, who is recruited into the newly formed Sisterhood of Mutants.

=== Power Elite ===
In the aftermath of the "Secret Empire", Selene has publicly become head of the White House's "Task Force of Faith-Based Initiatives", and joined the "Power Elite", an alliance of powerful people including Thunderbolt Ross, Baron Strucker, and Alexa Lukin. She also assists in the resurrection of Lukin's husband, Aleksander Lukin.

=== "Dawn of X" ===
In the "House of X" storyline, Selene arrives at Krakoa, an island nation for mutants established by Professor X, Magneto and Moira MacTaggert. Professor X tasks Selene and Emplate with measuring the amount of psychic energy that Krakoa would take from its inhabitants. A similar protocol is put in place for Selene and Emplate, as they need to feed on mutants to survive.

== Powers and abilities ==
Selene is a mutant "psychic vampire" with the ability to sustain herself by psionically draining the life force of other human beings into herself. If she drains a person's entire life force, the victim dies and crumbles to dust in seconds. If Selene only drains the victim's life force partially, she achieves a measure of psychic control over her victim's mind, thereby subverting them to her will. Selene can also cause a human being to become a psychic vampire like herself, but be subordinate to Selene's own will. Selene's youthful appearance and vitality depends upon her absorbing life force. By channeling absorbed energy, Selene can enhance her physical strength, speed, stamina, agility, reflexes, and durability to superhuman levels.

Selene is also a powerful telekinetic. Her most direct weapon is the telekinetic power to animate or levitate inorganic matter on a molecular level, by projecting part of her absorbed life force into it. She can affect nearly anything within her line of sight, and can warp and alter the molecules of inanimate matter to her whim, causing objects to wrap around and constrict others, creating lifelike humanoid structures to combat her opponents, or simply reducing objects to dust. She can use this power in more standard ways, such as creating powerful force fields around herself, and can levitate herself and others but cannot truly fly. Selene can also control and manipulate fire in a variety of ways, though she cannot create the fire herself.

Selene possesses an undefined level of telepathic ability. Selene has used her abilities to scan minds for information and was able to communicate mentally. She often uses her telepathy to blend her psychic signature into the background thoughts around her, making her difficult for other psionics to locate or track, or to induce a hypnotic trance in others, during which she slips away at superhuman speed, leaving them with the impression that she simply vanished.

Selene is able to temporarily assume the appearance of others. Like many of her other abilities, it is unknown if this is achieved through magic, telepathy, or other means.

Selene possesses considerable magical abilities and extensive knowledge of sorcery, enabling her to cast and counteract spells. While the full extent of Selene's magical skill is not known, her greatly extended lifespan has given her sufficient knowledge and experience to be considered a threat to Kulan Gath. She was able to cast an illusion sufficient to fool Gath at his most powerful. Selene was revealed by the Eye of Agamotto to be one of several magic-users with the potential to be Doctor Strange's successor as Sorcerer Supreme.

== Reception ==
=== Critical reception ===
CBR.com ranked Selene 2nd in their "X-Men: The 10 Most Powerful Female Villains" list, 5th in their "Marvel's 10 Most Powerful Female Mutants" list, and 14th in their "21 Most Powerful Sorcerer Supreme Candidates" list.Screen Rant included her in their "10 New Characters We Can Hope To See In X-Men '97" list, and ranked her 3rd in their "10 Smartest X-Men Characters" list, 7th in their "10 Strongest Female Marvel Villains" list, and 29th in their "Marvel: 50 Most Powerful Mutants, Ranked Weakest To Strongest" list.

== In other media ==
=== Television ===
Selene appears in Wolverine and the X-Men, voiced by April Stewart. This version is a member of the Inner Circle.

=== Film ===
- Underworld co-creator Kevin Grevioux confirmed that franchise protagonist Selene is based on Selene Gallio, with Kate Beckinsale further revealing that a crossover film starring her as Selene and Wesley Snipes as Blade had been cancelled in favor of a reboot.
- Selene appears in Dark Phoenix, portrayed by Kota Eberhardt. This version displays telepathic abilities and is a member of Erik Lehnsherr's Brotherhood of Mutants. She and the Brotherhood seek revenge on Jean Grey, only to be captured by the U.S. government. Amidst a D'Bari attack, Selene and fellow Brotherhood member Ariki are killed in battle.

=== Video games ===
- Selene appears as the final boss of Gambit's stage in Spider-Man and the X-Men in Arcade's Revenge.
- Selene appears as a boss in Wolverine: Adamantium Rage.
- Selene appears in X-Men Legends II: Rise of Apocalypse, voiced by Jeannie Elias.
- Selene appears in Marvel: Avengers Alliance.
- Selene appears in Marvel Snap.
