= The New Mutants (comic book) =

Superhero comic book series

New Mutants
- Cover to New Mutants #50. Pencils by Rick Leonardi, inks by Dan Green.

Publication information
- Publisher: Marvel Comics
- Format: Ongoing series
- Genre: Superhero
- Publication date: List: (vol. 1) Nov. 1982–Feb. 1991 (vol. 2) May 2003–Apr. 2004 (vol. 3) May 2009–Oct. 2012 (vol. 4) Nov. 2019–Dec. 2022
- No. of issues: List: (vol. 1): 100 (vol. 2): 13 (vol. 3): 50 (vol. 4): 33
- Main character: New Mutants
- ISSN: 0747-4601

The New Mutants is a comic book series which debuted in 1983, featuring the team the New Mutants and published by Marvel Comics.

The team first appeared in the graphic novel The New Mutants (November 1982) by Chris Claremont and artist Bob McLeod, part of the Marvel Graphic Novel line, followed by their first ongoing series which ran from 1983 until 1991. Like the X-Men parent title, also written by Claremont, The New Mutants featured an ensemble cast, with stories often focused on interpersonal relationships and coming-of-age arcs, blending teen drama with action and adventure. The series was taken over by writer Louise Simonson, ultimately taking a more action-oriented focus under artist Rob Liefeld, who relaunched the characters as X-Force following the series' end.

Since their inception, several New Mutants series have been published, either focusing on the continuing adventures of the original lineup, new groups of young mutants, or some combination of both.

== Publication history ==
=== Original run ===
By the early 1980s, The Uncanny X-Men (under the authorship of Chris Claremont) had become one of the comic book industry's most successful titles, prompting Marvel editor-in-chief Jim Shooter to launch The New Mutants, the first of several X-Men spin-offs. X-Men editor Louise Simonson recalled "Neither Chris [Claremont] or I really wanted to do it. We wanted X-Men to be special and by itself, but Shooter told us that if we didn't come up with a new 'mutant' book, someone else would." The series was primarily written by Claremont and Simonson, with Rob Liefeld plotting the final three issues and Fabian Nicieza scripting issues #91 and 98–100.

The team was intended to debut in their own series. As the first issue was nearing completion, Shooter ordered it to be reworked into a graphic novel so that Marvel Graphic Novel could make its deadline for the next issue. Thus, the New Mutants debuted in Marvel Graphic Novel #4 (November 1982), which continued a plotline from The Uncanny X-Men. (Despite this, the graphic novel missed its shipping slot by two weeks due to artist Bob McLeod's honeymoon.)

Reflecting later on his run on the title, Claremont spoke about the appeal of stories focused on this younger cast: "The X-Men are fun but they're grown-ups. They're already set. The kids are the fungible ones. They're making mistakes and they don't know quite what they're doing. This adventure might lead them to Asgard, the next one might lead them to someone committing suicide. It's like seeing the evolution of Prince Hal through Henry IV 1 & 2, leading up to Henry V. It's about growing and learning and taking responsibility."

The series was originally written by Claremont and illustrated by McLeod, the team's co-creators, but McLeod soon passed artistic duties on to Sal Buscema. McLeod was unprepared for the demands of doing both pencils and inks on a monthly book, prompting him to have Buscema do the breakdowns after the first three issues, and left entirely after issue #8 when he began to lose interest in the stories. Claremont gave the series a darker tone, which was heightened with the arrival of artist Bill Sienkiewicz. Sienkiewicz's avant garde art style and painted covers broke through the conventional comic book boundaries of the day and helped The New Mutants stand out on the shelf.

In addition to depictions of teenage angst and growing pains, the series featured themes of mysticism. The stories also relied on wilder, more far-fetched premises than were typical of X-Men at the time, shaping into more of a science fiction and fantasy series than the superhero coming-of-age comic it had been touted as in its early days.

A supplementary The New Mutants Annual series began in 1984. These annuals were always written by whoever was the regular New Mutants writer at the time and often included significant changes to the status quo. These changes were not explained in the parent series, so that readers would have to buy The New Mutants Annual to follow events in both series. The 1985 annual was solicited as The New Mutants Annual #2, but published as The New Mutants Special Edition #1 because it exceeded the maximum page count for an annual.

With Claremont taking on Wolverine and Excalibur, he left The New Mutants and the series was turned over to writer Louise Simonson and illustrator Bret Blevins with issue #55 (September 1987). Simonson was intended to be only a fill-in writer for the six months Claremont needed to get the two new series launched, but Claremont ultimately remained with his new projects, and Simonson ended up writing the series for over three years. During her run, due to his unpopularity with readers and artists, Cypher is killed off in The New Mutants #60 (February 1988). Simonson recalled, "He wasn't fun to draw. He just stood around and hid behind a tree during a fight... Every artist who ever did him said 'Can't we kill this guy?' We would get letters from fans about how much they hated him."

The most controversial issue of Simonson's run was The New Mutants #64 (June 1988). Titled "Instant Replay!", the story deals with the New Mutants' mourning for Cypher, and includes a scene in which Warlock attempts to resurrect Cypher by taking his corpse out of its coffin and showing it to Cypher's loved ones. Simonson holds it to be her favorite New Mutants story, though she acknowledges that many readers found it too morbid.

Sales of the series had slumped for several years, but took a sharp upturn after Rob Liefeld took over the penciling and co-plotting chores at the end of 1989. A new mentor for the group, the mysterious mercenary Cable, was introduced, further helping sales. However, the relationship between Liefeld and Simonson was fraught with tension, and Simonson claims that editor Bob Harras dealt with the situation by rewriting her plots and dialogue so that the characterizations did not make sense: "Although I wasn't being fired, I think I was being shoved out the door with both hands by Bob Harras. Bob was only doing what he had to do, I expect, which was make Rob Liefeld happy." Simonson eventually gave in, leaving after issue #97. When Liefeld and Fabian Nicieza, who wrote dialogue based on Liefeld's plots, took over as writers of the final three issues of the series, they included several harder-edged characters.

The New Mutants was cancelled in 1991 with issue #100, but the new platoon-like team formed by Cable continued in X-Force, a successful series (whose first issue sold approximately five million copies) that would continue until 2002 and feature a variety of the former New Mutants cast.

=== 2003 series ===
The second incarnation of the New Mutants debuted in 2003 with the ongoing series New Mutants, written by Nunzio DeFilippis and Christina Weir. The series followed Mirage, Karma, and Wolfsbane as they taught a new generation of students, and featured appearances from other original New Mutants members. The series would continue for 13 issues, until June 2004, before being relaunched as New X-Men: Academy X in July 2004, with a greater focus on the newer and younger characters.

=== 2009 series ===
In May 2009, a third volume of New Mutants was launched. The series was initially written by Zeb Wells and pencilled by Diógenes Neves with the titular characters forming a new field team for the X-Men. The team is a reunion of the cast from the first volume.

The story is spun from events from the limited series X-Infernus, and revisited many of the stories from the first volume of the series, including a lingering plot thread from the X-Men event Inferno. The series also intersected with the greater X-Men line during crossover events Necrosha, Second Coming and Age of X.

Dan Abnett and Andy Lanning took over writing duties with issue #25, with the series ultimately finishing at issue #50. During the run, Abnett and Lanning introduced Nate Grey and Blink to the team.

=== 2019 series ===
New Mutants
- Cover to New Mutants (vol. 4) #1 by Rod Reis.

Publication information
- Publisher: Marvel Comics
- Schedule: Monthly
- No. of issues: 33

Creative team
- Written by: List: Jonathan Hickman Ed Brisson Vita Ayala Danny Lore Alyssa Wong Charlie Jane Anders
- Artist: List: Interiors: Rod Reis Flaviano Armentaro Marco Failla Danilo Beyruth Alex Lins Jan Duursema Guillermo Sanna Bauza Emma Kubert Jason Loo Justin Mason Geoff Shaw Roberto Poggi Alberto Alburquerque Ro Stein Ted Brandt Main covers: Rod Reis Mike del Mundo Christian Ward Martin Simmonds Leinil Francis Yu Rafael de Latorre
- Letterer: Travis Lanham
- Colorist: List: Rod Reis Carlos Lopez Matt Milla Dan Brown Ruth Redmond Antonio Fabela Jason Loo Bryan Valenza Nolan Woodard Tamra Bonvillain
- Editor: List: Editor Jordan D. White Annalise Bissa Sarah Brunstad Assistant Editor Annalise Bissa Anita Okoye Head of X Jonathan Hickman

New Mutants was relaunched in November 2019 as part of Dawn of X. The series was at first written by Jonathan Hickman and Ed Brisson, doing rotating issues, and was drawn by Rod Reis. Hickman's story saw the original New Mutants cast head off on a space adventure after reuniting on the island of Krakoa, before coming back to merge with Brisson's group of other younger mutants, as they faced down challenges from both Krakoa and afar.

Vita Ayala took over the title with issue #14 in December 2020. Their run saw the New Mutants characters position themselves as teachers to the younger mutants on the island.

After issue #30, an anniversary issue that celebrated 40 years of the New Mutants, writing duties were handed to Charlie Jane Anders, whose run centered on the mutant Escapade. The series lasted until issue #33, before being wrapped up in the five-issue mini-series New Mutants Lethal Legion by Anders and Enid Balam in 2023.

==== Volume 4 issues ====
Reception of issues of New Mutants volume 4
| Issue | Publication Date | Writer(s) | Artist | Colorist | Comic Book Roundup rating | Estimated sales to North American retailers (first month) |
|---|---|---|---|---|---|---|
| #1 | November 6, 2019 | Jonathan Hickman & Ed Brisson | Rod Reis | | 8.4 by 25 professional critics | 138,484 |
| #2 | November 27, 2019 | Jonathan Hickman | Rod Reis | | 8.9 by 14 professional critics | 60,518 |
| #3 | December 11, 2019 | Ed Brisson | Flaviano Armentaro | Carlos Lopez | 7.6 by 14 professional critics | 49,991 |
| #4 | December 18, 2019 | Ed Brisson | Marco Failla | Carlos Lopez | 7.3 by 9 professional critics | 47,489 |
| #5 | January 8, 2020 | Jonathan Hickman | Rod Reis | | 8.7 by 13 professional critics | 50,013 |
| #6 | January 22, 2020 | Ed Brisson | Flaviano Armentaro | Carlos Lopez | 6.9 by 11 professional critics | 46,521 |
| #7 | February 19, 2020 | Jonathan Hickman | Rod Reis | | 8.2 by 13 professional critics | 40,427 |
| #8 | February 26, 2020 | Ed Brisson | Marco Failla | Carlos Lopez | 7.2 by 11 professional critics | 39,251 |
| #9 | March 11, 2020 | Ed Brisson | Flaviano Armentaro | Carlos Lopez | 7.8 by 11 professional critics | 40,974 |
| #10 | June 10, 2020 | Ed Brisson | Flaviano Armentaro | Carlos Lopez | 7.5 by 10 professional critics | Data not available |
| #11 | July 22, 2020 | Ed Brisson | Flaviano Armentaro | Carlos Lopez | 7.4 by 8 professional critics | Data not available |
| #12 | September 2, 2020 | Ed Brisson | Marco Failla | Carlos Lopez | 8.3 by 9 professional critics | 26,500–31,000 |
| #13 | October 14, 2020 | Ed Brisson | Rod Reis | | 8.5 by 8 professional critics | 45,000–50,000 |
| #14 | December 16, 2020 | Vita Ayala | Rod Reis | | 8.0 by 11 professional critics | Data not yet available |
| #15 | January 27, 2021 | Vita Ayala | Rod Reis | | 7.9 by 9 professional critics | Data not yet available |
| #16 | February 24, 2021 | Vita Ayala | Rod Reis | | 7.8 by 6 professional critics | Data not yet available |
| #17 | April 28, 2021 | Vita Ayala | Rod Reis | | 7.4 by 5 professional critics | Data not yet available |
| #18 | May 26, 2021 | Vita Ayala | Rod Reis | | 8.8 by 5 professional critics | Data not yet available |
| #19 | June 16, 2021 | Vita Ayala | Alex Lins | Matt Milla | 8.3 by 8 professional critics | Data not yet available |
| #20 | July 21, 2021 | Vita Ayala | Alex Lins | Matt Milla | 8.2 by 5 professional critics | Data not yet available |
| #21 | September 1, 2021 | Vita Ayala | Rod Reis | | 8.8 by 5 professional critics | Data not yet available |
| #22 | October 6, 2021 | Vita Ayala | Rod Reis | | 8.6 by 6 professional critics | Data not yet available |
| #23 | December 1, 2021 | Vita Ayala | Rod Reis | | 9.1 by 3 professional critics | Data not yet available |
| #24 | February 9, 2022 | Vita Ayala | Danilo Beyruth | Dan Brown | 8.8 by 4 professional critics | Data not yet available |
| #25 | May 18, 2022 | Vita Ayala | Jan Duursema, Rod Reis | Ruth Redmond, Rod Reis | 9.0 by 6 professional critics | Data not yet available |
| #26 | June 22, 2022 | Vita Ayala | Jan Duursema, Rod Reis | Ruth Redmond, Rod Reis | 8.9 by 5 professional critics | Data not yet available |
| #27 | July 13, 2022 | Vita Ayala | Jan Duursema, Rod Reis | Ruth Redmond, Rod Reis | 8.9 by 3 professional critics | Data not yet available |
| #28 | August 17, 2022 | Vita Ayala | Jan Duursema, Rod Reis | Ruth Redmond, Rod Reis | 8.1 by 4 professional critics | Data not yet available |
| #29 | September 7, 2022 | Danny Lore | Guillermo Sanna Bauza | Dan Brown | 8.1 by 4 professional critics | Data not yet available |
| #30 | September 21, 2022 | Vita Ayala, Alyssa Wong | Emma Kubert, Alex Lins, Jason Loo, Justin Mason, Geoff Shaw, Roberto Poggi | Antonio Fabela, Jason Loo, Bryan Valenza, Nolan Woodard | 8.6 by 6 professional critics | Data not yet available |
| #31 | October 6, 2022 | Charlie Jane Anders | Alberto Alburquerque, Ro Stein, Ted Brandt | Carlos Lopez, Tamra Bonvillain | 7.0 by 4 professional critics | Data not yet available |
| #32 | December 7, 2023 | Charlie Jane Anders | Alberto Alburquerque, Ro Stein, Ted Brandt | Carlos Lopez, Tamra Bonvillain | 5.9 by 3 professional critics | Data not yet available |
| #33 | December 28, 2022 | Charlie Jane Anders | Alberto Alburquerque, Ro Stein, Ted Brandt | Carlos Lopez, Tamra Bonvillain | 4.3 by 3 professional critics | Data not yet available |

Reception of issues of New Mutants Lethal Legion
| Issue | Publication Date | Writer(s) | Artist | Colorist | Comic Book Roundup rating | Estimated sales to North American retailers (first month) |
|---|---|---|---|---|---|---|
| #1 | March 8, 2023 | Charlie Jane Anders | Enid Balam, Elisabetta D'Amico | Matt Milla | 7.3 by 5 professional critics | Data not yet available |
| #2 | April 19, 2023 | Charlie Jane Anders | Enid Balam, Elisabetta D'Amico | Matt Milla | 5.0 by 1 professional critic | Data not yet available |
| #3 | May 24, 2023 | Charlie Jane Anders | Enid Balam, Elisabetta D'Amico | Matt Milla | 6.0 by 1 professional critic | Data not yet available |
| #4 | June 21, 2023 | Charlie Jane Anders | Enid Balam, Elisabetta D'Amico | Matt Milla | 5.3 by 2 professional critics | Data not yet available |
| #5 | July 19, 2023 | Charlie Jane Anders | Enid Balam, Elisabetta D'Amico | Matt Milla | 6.0 by 2 professional critics | Data not yet available |

== Contributors ==
=== Vol. 1 (1983–1991) ===
==== Writers ====
| Years | Writer | Issues |
|---|---|---|
| 1983–1987, 1988, 1989 | Chris Claremont | #1–54, #63, #81, Annual #1–3 |
| 1987–1991 | Louise Simonson | #55–80, #82–91, #93–97, Annual #4–6 |
| 1990 | Dwight Zimmerman | #92 |
| 1991 | Rob Liefeld | #98–100 |
| 1990, 1991 | Fabian Nicieza | #91, #98–100, Annual #7 |

==== Pencilers ====
| Years | Penciler | Issues |
|---|---|---|
| 1983–1984 | Bob McLeod | #1–3, Annual #1 |
| 1983–1984, 1987 | Sal Buscema | #4–17, #54 |
| 1984–1985 | Bill Sienkiewicz | #18–31 |
| 1985 | Steve Leialoha | #32–34 |
| 1986 | Mary Wilshire | #35–37 |
| 1986–1987 | Alan Davis | Annual #2–3 |
| 1986–1989 | Rick Leonardi | #38, #52–53, #78 |
| 1986 | Keith Pollard | #39 |
| 1986–1987 | Jackson Guice | #40–42, #44–48, #50 |
| 1986 | Steve Purcell | #43 |
| 1987–1990 | Bret Blevins | #49, #55, #57–61, #64–69, #71–74, #79–80, #82–83 |
| 1987 | Kevin Nowlan | #51 |
| 1987–1988 | June Brigman | #56, Annual #4 |
| 1988 | Jon J Muth | #62 |
| 1988 | Bo Hampton | #63 |
| 1988–1990 | Terry Shoemaker | #70, #81, #84, Annual #6 |
| 1989 | John Byrne | #75 |
| 1989 | Rich Buckler | #76–77 |
| 1989 | Louis Williams | #81 |
| 1990 | Chris Wozniak | Annual #6 |
| 1990 | Geof Isherwood | #85 |
| 1989–1991 | Rob Liefeld | #86–91, #93–96, #98-100, Annual #5 |
| 1990 | Bob Hall | #92 |
| 1991 | Guang Yap | #97, Annual #7 |

=== Vol. 2 (2003–2004) ===
==== Writers ====
| Years | Writer | Issues |
|---|---|---|
| 2003–2004 | Nunzio DeFilippis & Christina Weir | #1–13 |

==== Pencilers ====
| Years | Penciler | Issues |
|---|---|---|
| 2003 | Keron Grant | #1-4 |
| 2003 | Mark Robinson | #5-6 |
| 2003-2004 | Carlo Barberi | #7-11 |
| 2004 | Khary Randolph | #12-13 |

=== Vol. 3 (2009–2012) ===
==== Writers ====
| Years | Writer | Issues |
|---|---|---|
| 2009-2011 | Zeb Wells | #1–21 |
| 2011 | Mike Carey | #22-24 |
| 2011-2012 | Dan Abnett & Andy Lanning | #25-50 |

==== Pencilers ====
| Years | Penciler | Issues |
|---|---|---|
| 2009 | Diógenes Neves | #1-4, #6-8 |
| 2009 | Zachary Baldus | #5 |
| 2010 | Paul Davidson | #9-10 |
| 2010-2012 | David López | #10, #33-37, #41 |
| 2010 | Niko Henrichon | #11 |
| 2010 | Ibraim Roberson | #12-14 |
| 2010 | Lan Medina | #13-14 |
| 2010 | Nathan Fox | #14 |
| 2010-2011 | Leonard Kirk | #15-21 |
| 2010-2011 | Andrew Currie | #20-21 |
| 2011 | Steve Kurth | #22-24 |
| 2011-2012 | Leandro Fernández | #25-27, #38-40, #44-46 |
| 2011 | Michael Ryan | #28 |
| 2011 | David Lafuente | #29-32 |
| 2011 | Robbi Rodriguez | #32 |
| 2012 | Carmine Di Giandomenico | #42-43 |
| 2012 | Felix Ruiz | #47-50 |

=== Vol. 4 (2019–2022) ===
==== Writers ====
| Years | Writer | Issues |
|---|---|---|
| 2019–2020 | Jonathan Hickman | #1–2, #5, #7 |
| 2019-2020 | Ed Brisson | #3-4, #6, #8-13 |
| 2020-2022 | Vita Ayala | #14-28, #30 |
| 2022 | Danny Lore | #29 |
| 2022 | Alyssa Wong | #30 |
| 2022-2023 | Charlie Jane Anders | #31-33, Lethal Legion #1-5 |

==== Pencilers ====
| Years | Penciler | Issues |
|---|---|---|
| 2019-2022 | Rod Reis | #1-2, #5, #7, #13-18, #21-23, #25-28 |
| 2019-2020 | Flaviano Armentaro | #3, #6, #9-11 |
| 2019-2020 | Marco Failla | #4, #8, #12 |
| 2021-2022 | Alex Lins | #19-20, #30 |
| 2022 | Danilo Beyruth | #24 |
| 2022 | Jan Duursema | #25-28 |
| 2022 | Guillermo Sanna Bauza | #29 |
| 2022 | Justin Mason | #30 |
| 2022 | Jason Loo | #30 |
| 2022 | Emma Kubert | #30 |
| 2022 | Geoff Shaw | #30 |
| 2022 | Alberto Alburquerque | #31-33 |
| 2022 | Ro Stein | #31-33 |
| 2023 | Enid Balam | Lethal Legion #1-5 |

== Collected editions ==
=== Volume 1 ===
The New Mutants has been reprinted in several trade paperbacks, some containing specific story arcs (such as the "Demon Bear Saga" by Claremont and Sienkiewicz), and some collected as part of a larger crossover of the various X-titles. Only in 2006, however, did a chronological reprinting of the series begin, with the commencement of The New Mutants Classic series of trade paperbacks.

Omnibus collections of New Mutants (Volume 1)
| Title | Material collected | Publication date | ISBN |
|---|---|---|---|
| New Mutants Omnibus, Volume 1 | The New Mutants #1–34, Annual #1; Marvel Graphic Novel #4; Marvel Team-Up Annual #6; Marvel Team-Up #100 (A story), #149; Uncanny X-Men #160, #167, #180, #189, #192; Magik #1-4 | December 2020 | 978-1302926885 |
| New Mutants Omnibus, Volume 2 | The New Mutants #35–54, Annual #2-3; New Mutants Special Edition #1; X-Men Annual #9-10; Power Pack #20, #33; Fallen Angels #1-8; Firestar #1-4; New Mutants: War Children #1; Material from Web of Spider Man Annual #2 | November 2021 | 978-1302932343 |
| New Mutants Omnibus, Volume 3 | The New Mutants #55-85, Annual #4; Power Pack #40; Spellbound #4; Uncanny X-Men #231; X-Terminators #1-4; Material from Marvel Comics Presents #22, Marvel Fanfare #55, Marvel Super-Heroes #1; X-Men: Odd Men Out #1 | December 2023 | |
| X-Men: Fall of the Mutants Omnibus | New Mutants (1983) 55-61; Uncanny X-Men (1981) 220-227; X-Factor (1986) 18-26; Captain America (1968) 339; Daredevil (1964) 252; Fantastic Four (1961) 312; Incredible Hulk (1968) 336-337, 340; Power Pack (1984) 35 | May 2022 | 978-1302934118 |
| X-Men Inferno Prologue Omnibus | New Mutants (1983) 62-70, X-Factor (1986) 27-32, X-Factor Annual (1986) 3, Uncanny X-Men (1981) 228-238, New Mutants Annual (1984) 4, X-Men Annual (1970) 12; material from Marvel Age Annual (1985) 4, Marvel Fanfare (1982) 40 | December 2021 | 978-1302931360 |
| X-Men Inferno Omnibus | New Mutants #71-73, X-Factor #33-40, X-Terminators #1-4, Uncanny X-Men #239-243, Power Pack #40, #42-44, Avengers #298-300, Fantastic Four #322-324, Amazing Spider-Man #311-313, Spectacular Spider-Man #146-148, Web Of Spider-Man #47-48, Daredevil #262-263, #265, Excalibur #6-7, Mutant Misadventures Of Cloak and Dagger #4, and material from X-Factor Annual #4. | May 2021 | 978-1302928544 |
| Atlantis Attacks Omnibus | New Mutants #76, Annual #5; Silver Surfer Annual #2; Iron Man Annual #10; Marvel Comics Presents #26; Uncanny X-Men Annual #13; Amazing Spider-Man Annual #23; Punisher Annual #2; Spectacular Spider-Man Annual #9; Daredevil Annual #4; Avengers Annual #18; X-Factor Annual #4; Web of Spider-Man Annual #5; Avengers West Coast #56, Annual #4; Thor Annual #14; Fantastic Four Annual #22 | March 2011 | 978-0785144922 |
| Acts of Vengeance Crossovers Omnibus | New Mutants #84–86; Uncanny X-Men #256–258; Fantastic Four #334–336; Wolverine #19–20; Dr. Strange, Sorcerer Supreme #11–13; Incredible Hulk #363; Punisher #28–29; Punisher War Journal #12–13; Marc Spector: Moon Knight #8–10; Daredevil #275–276; Power Pack #53; Alpha Flight #79–80; X-Factor #49–50; Damage Control #1–4; and Web of Spider-Man #64–65 | August 2011 | 978-0-7851-4488-5 |
| X-Force Omnibus, volume 1 | New Mutants #98-100, Annual #7; X-Men Annual #15; X-Factor Annual #6; X-Force #1-15; Spider-Man #16; Cable: Blood & Metal #1-2; material from New Warriors Annual #1, X-Force Annual #1 | February 2013 | 978-0785165958 |
| Secret Wars II Omnibus | New Mutants #30, #36–37; Secret Wars II #1–9; Uncanny X-Men #198, #202–203; Captain America #308; Iron Man #197; Fantastic Four #282, #285, #288, #316–319; Web of Spider-Man #6; Amazing Spider-Man #268, #273–274; Daredevil #223; Incredible Hulk #312; Avengers #260–261, #265–266; Dazzler #40; Alpha Flight #28; Thing #30; Doctor Strange #74; Cloak and Dagger #4; Power Pack #18; Thor #363; Power Man and Iron Fist #121; Peter Parker, the Spectacular Spider-Man #111; Defenders #152; Quasar #8 | May 2009 | 978-0785131113 |
| Mutant Massacre Omnibus | Uncanny X-Men #210-219, Annual #11; X-Factor #9-17, Annual #2; New Mutants #46; Thor #373-374, #377-378; Power Pack #27; Daredevil #238; Fantastic Four VS. The X-Men #1-4; X-Men VS. The Avengers #1-4 | May 2018 | 978-1302914240 |

Collected Epic Editions of New Mutants (Volume 1)
| Title | Material collected | Publication date | ISBN |
|---|---|---|---|
| New Mutants Epic Collection, Vol. 1: Renewal | Marvel Graphic Novel No. 4 - The New Mutants, The New Mutants #1–12, Uncanny X-Men #167, Marvel Team-Up Annual #6, Magik #1–4 and material from Marvel Team-Up #100 | March 2017 | 978-1302903657 |
| New Mutants Epic Collection, Vol. 2: The Demon Bear Saga | The New Mutants #13–31, Annual #1 | July 2019 | 978-1302918422 |
| New Mutants Epic Collection Vol 3: Asgardian Wars | The New Mutants #32-44, Annual #2, Special Edition #1, X-Men Annual #9 | June 2023 | 978-1302951627 |
| New Mutants Epic Collection Vol 4: Fallen Angels | The New Mutants #45-54, Annual #3; Fallen Angels #1-8 | June 2024 | |
| New Mutants Epic Collection Vol 5: Sudden Death | The New Mutants #55-70, Annual #4 | August 2021 | 978-1302930844 |
| New Mutants Epic Collection, Vol. 6: Curse of the Valkyries | X-Terminators #1–4;The New Mutants #71–85 | February 2018 | 978-1302910174 |
| New Mutants Epic Collection, Vol. 7: Cable | The New Mutants #86-94,The New Mutants Annual #5-6,The New Mutants Summer Special #1 and material from X-Factor Annual #5 and X-Men Annual #14 | October 2020 | 978-1302925239 |
| New Mutants Epic Collection Vol 8: The End Of The Beginning | The New Mutants #95-100, Annual 7, Uncanny X-Men #270-272, X-Factor #60-62; material from New Warriors Annual #1, X-Men Annual #15, X-Factor Annual #6 | July 2022 | 978-1302946647 |

Collected Editions of New Mutants (Volume 1)
| Title | Material collected | Publication date | ISBN |
|---|---|---|---|
| New Mutants Classic, Volume 1 | The New Mutants #1–7; Marvel Graphic Novel #4; Uncanny X-Men #167 | May 2006 | 0785121943 |
| New Mutants Classic, Volume 2 | The New Mutants #8–17 | January 2007 | 0785121951 |
| New Mutants Classic, Volume 3 | The New Mutants #18–25, Annual #1 | May 2008 | 0785131191 |
| New Mutants: The Demon Bear Saga | The New Mutants #18–21 | December 1990 | 0871356732 |
| New Mutants Classic, Volume 4 | The New Mutants #26–34 | March 2009 | 0785137289 |
| New Mutants Classic, Volume 5 | The New Mutants #35–40; New Mutants Special Edition; Uncanny X-Men Annual #9 | March 2010 | 0785144609 |
| New Mutants Classic, Volume 6 | The New Mutants #41–47; Annual #2; Uncanny X-Men Annual #10 | August 2011 | 0785155449 |
| X-Men: Mutant Massacre | The New Mutants #46; Uncanny X-Men #210–213; X-Factor #9–11; Thor #373–374; Power Pack #27 | October 2001 | 0785102248 |
| New Mutants Classic, Volume 7 | The New Mutants #48–54; Annual #3 | May 2012 | 978-0785159711 |
| New Mutants Forever | The New Mutants #53–54; New Mutants Forever #1–5 | February 2011 | 9780785147473 |
| X-Men: Fall of the Mutants Vol. 1 | The New Mutants #55–61; Uncanny X-Men #220–227; Incredible Hulk #340 | February 2013 | 978-0785167440 |
| X-Men: Fall of the Mutants | The New Mutants #59–61; Uncanny X-Men #225–227; X-Factor #24–26 | February 2002 | 0785108254 |
| X-Men: Fall of the Mutants Omnibus | New Mutants #55–61; Uncanny X-Men #220–227; X-Factor #19–26; Captain America #339; Daredevil #252; Fantastic Four #312; Incredible Hulk #340; Power Pack #35 | May 2011 | 978-0-7851-5822-6 |
| X-Men: Inferno Prologue | The New Mutants #62–70, Annual #4; Uncanny X-Men #228–238, Annual #12; X-Factor #27–32, Annual #3; Material from Marvel Age Annual #4; Marvel Fanfare #40 | December 2014 | 0785192735 |
| X-Men: Inferno | The New Mutants #71–73; Uncanny X-Men #239–243; X-Factor #36–39 | December 1996 | 0785102221 |
| X-Men: Inferno (Hardcover edition) | New Mutants #71–73; Uncanny X-Men #239–243; X-Factor #33–40; X-Terminators #1–4; X-Factor Annual #4 | June 2009 | 978-0785137771 |
| Cable and the New Mutants | The New Mutants #86–94, New Mutants Annual #5 | January 2011 | 0785149708 |
| Cable Classic, Volume 1 | The New Mutants #87; Cable: Blood and Metal #1–2; Cable #1–4 | March 2008 | 078513123X |
| X-Men: X-Tinction Agenda | The New Mutants #95–97; Uncanny X-Men #270–272; X-Factor #60–62 | November 1991 | 0871359227 |
| X-Men: X-Tinction Agenda (Hardcover edition) | New Mutants #95–97; Uncanny X-Men #235–238 & #270–272; X-Factor (1986) #60–62 | August 2011 | 978-0785155317 |
| Deadpool Classic, Volume 1 | The New Mutants #98; Deadpool ("The Circle Chase") #1–4; Deadpool, vol. 2 ("Sins of the Past") #1–4; Deadpool, vol. 3 #1 | May 2008 | 0785131248 |
| X-Force: Shatterstar | The New Mutants #99–100; X-Force: Shatterstar #1–4 | August 2005 | 0785116338 |
| X-Force: A Force to be Reckoned With | The New Mutants #98–100, X-Force #1–4, Spider-Man #16 | January 2011 | 978-0785149842 |

=== Volume 2 ===
Collected editions of New Mutants (Volume 2)
| Title | Material collected | Publication date | ISBN |
|---|---|---|---|
| New Mutants: Back to School | New Mutants, vol. 2 #1–6 | March 2005 | 0785112421 |
| New Mutants: Back to School – Complete Collection | New Mutants, vol. 2 #1–13; X-Men Unlimited #42–43 | January 2018 | 978-1302910327 |

=== Volume 3 ===
Collected editions of New Mutants (Volume 3)
| Title | Material collected | Publication date | ISBN |
|---|---|---|---|
| New Mutants: Return of Legion | New Mutants, vol. 3 #1–5; Marvel Spotlight: New Mutants | December 2009 | 0785139923 |
| New Mutants: Necrosha | New Mutants, vol. 3 #6–11 | May 2010 | 0785139931 |
| X-Necrosha | New X-Men #32; X-Force vol. 3 #11, #21–25; New Mutants vol. 3 #6–8; X-Men: Legacy #231–234; X-Force/New Mutants: Necrosha One-Shot; X Necrosha: The Gathering; material from X-Force vol. 3 Annual #1 | December 2010 | 078514675X |
| X-Men: Second Coming | Second Coming: Prepare; Second Coming #1–2; Uncanny X-Men #523–525; New Mutants, vol. 3 #12–14; X-Men Legacy #235–237; X-Force vol. 3 #26–28 | September 2010 | 0785146784 |
| New Mutants: Fall of the New Mutants | New Mutants, vol. 3 #15–21 | March 2011 | 0785145834 |
| X-Men: Age of X | Age of X: Alpha; X-Men Legacy #245–247; New Mutants, vol. 3 #22–24; Age of X: Universe #1–2 | July 2011 | 078515289X |
| New Mutants: Unfinished Business | New Mutants, vol. 3 #25–28 | October 2011 | 078515230X |
| Fear Itself: Wolverine/New Mutants | Fear Itself: Wolverine #1–3; New Mutants, vol. 3 #29–32 | April 2012 | 0785158081 |
| New Mutants: A Date with the Devil | New Mutants, vol. 3 #33–37 | April 2012 | 0785152326 |
| New Mutants: De-Animator | New Mutants, vol. 3 #38–41 | November 2012 | 0785161600 |
| Journey Into Mystery/New Mutants: Exiled | New Mutants, vol. 3 #42–43, Exiled #1, Journey Into Mystery #637–638 | September 2012 | 0785165401 |
| New Mutants: Fight the Future | New Mutants, vol. 3 #44–50 | December 2012 | 0785161619 |

=== Volume 4 ===
Collected editions of New Mutants (Volume 4)
| Title | Material collected | Format | Publication date | ISBN |
|---|---|---|---|---|
| New Mutants by Jonathan Hickman – Volume 1 | New Mutants #1–2, 5, 7 | Trade paperback | May 12, 2020 | ISBN 978-1302919924 |
| New Mutants by Ed Brisson – Volume 1 | New Mutants #3–4, 6, 8–12 | Trade paperback | November 24, 2020 | ISBN 978-1302919931 |
| New Mutants by Vita Ayala – Volume 1 | New Mutants #14–18 | Trade paperback | August 10, 2021 | ISBN 978-1302927875 |
| New Mutants by Vita Ayala – Volume 2 | New Mutants #19–24 | Trade paperback | August 12, 2022 | ISBN 978-1302931193 |
| New Mutants by Vita Ayala – Volume 3 | New Mutants #25–28 | Trade paperback | November 8, 2022 | ISBN 978-1302931209 |
| New Mutants – Volume 4 | New Mutants #29–33 | Trade paperback | May 16, 2023 | ISBN 978-1302932763 |
| New Mutants: Lethal Legion | New Mutants: Lethal Legion #1–5 | Trade paperback | February 13, 2024 | ISBN 978-1302952419 |
