= Forearm (comics) =

- Forearm as depicted in S.W.O.R.D. (vol. 2) #5 (April 2021). Art by Valerio Schiti (penciler/inker) and Marte Garcia (colorist).

Publication information
- Publisher: Marvel Comics
- First appearance: The New Mutants #86 (Feb. 1990)
- Created by: Louise Simonson; Rob Liefeld

In-story information
- Full name: Michael McCain
- Species: Human mutant
- Team affiliations: Mutant Liberation Front; S.W.O.R.D. Krakoan Dark Riders
- Notable aliases: Michael McBride
- Abilities: Two additional arms Superhuman strength, stamina and physical resistance

Forearm (Michael McCain) is a fictional mutant villain appearing in American comic books published by Marvel Comics. As a member of the Mutant Liberation Front, Forearm has always been a mainstay on the terrorist group's roster, even staying through leader changes and incarceration.

== Publication history ==
Forearm first made a minor cameo appearance as a member of the Mutant Liberation Front in The New Mutants #86 (February 1990). He first fully appeared in the following issue, The New Mutants #87.

== Fictional character biography ==
Forearm is a founding member of the Mutant Liberation Front (MLF), a mutant terrorist organization. One of the group's first missions under the leadership of Stryfe is to liberate incarcerated New Mutants members Rusty Collins and Skids, who join the MLF out of confusion and are kept in the group via neural implants that influence their minds.

Forearm and the MLF approach Mister Sinister and propose a trade, taking the captive Cyclops and Jean Grey in exchange for Sinister taking the Legacy Virus from Stryfe. The MLF are later defeated by the X-Men and taken into custody.

Following the events of "X-Cutioner's Song", Reignfire forms a new incarnation of the MLF which consists of Forearm, Reaper, Wildside, Tempo, and new members Locus and Danielle Moonstar. Forearm forms a close friendship with Moonstar, but eventually discovers that she was an undercover agent working for S.H.I.E.L.D. Feeling betrayed, Forearm leaves the MLF.

During the Krakoan Age, Forearm joins the Security Team of S.W.O.R.D. and Magik's Dark Riders.

== Powers and abilities ==
Forearm has an additional pair of arms that extend from beneath his primary arms, giving him four in total. He also possesses increased strength, resistance to injury, and stamina.

== Other versions ==
An alternate universe version of Forearm appears in X-Men '92: House of XCII. This version was killed in the X of Swords tournament, with his subsequent resurrection inadvertently giving him six arms. This version of Forearm was conceptualized by writer Steve Foxe, who considered calling his resurrected self "Sixarms". After a discussion with Steve Orlando, Foxe changed the nickname to "Morearms".

== In other media ==
Forearm makes non-speaking appearances in X-Men: The Animated Series. This version is an inhabitant of Skull Mesa and member of Magneto's army.

== Reception ==
Forearm has been noted as an underwhelming villain.
