= Fatal Attractions (comics) =

Comic book crossover event

- Cover of X-Men vol. 2, 25 (Oct, 1993), art by Andy Kubert
- Publisher: Marvel Comics
- Publication date: July – November 1993
- Genre: Superhero; Crossover
Title(s)
Excalibur vol. 1, #71
The Uncanny X-Men #304
Wolverine vol. 2, #75
X-Factor vol. 1, #92
X-Force vol. 1, #25
X-Men vol. 2, #25
- Main character: X-Men; X-Factor; X-Force; Excalibur; Magneto

Creative team
- Writer(s): Fabian Nicieza, Scott Lobdell
- Artist(s): Andy Kubert, Adam Kubert, Greg Capullo, Joe Quesada, Ken Lashley, John Romita, Jr.

"Fatal Attractions" is a major X-Men crossover written by Fabian Nicieza and Scott Lobdell, published by Marvel Comics in 1993. Spanning the entire line of books, it served to commemorate the 30th anniversary of the X-Men's debut.

When Magneto and his Acolytes return, a new confrontation with the X-Men begins, with Professor Xavier tempted to cross a moral line to stop them.

== Plot summary ==
The Acolytes, now led by Fabian Cortez, attack Camp Hayden, the headquarters for Project Wideawake, a government Sentinel program. The base is defended by government-sponsored mutant team X-Factor and, as the battle rages, Cortez makes an offer to Quicksilver to be the Acolyte's new leader, accepting his role as Magneto's heir. The Acolytes leave after Quicksilver strongly declines.

X-Force is approached by the mutant Exodus, who brings an offer of sanctuary from an unknown greater power. It is revealed that the "sanctuary" (which is referred to as Avalon) is Cable's former base of operations Graymalkin (now retrofitted with Shi'ar technology), and the "greater power" to be the mutant Magneto, who was presumed dead after the fall of Asteroid M. Cable teleports X-Force away from Avalon using the station's bodyslide technology, while he retrieves the sentient computer program Professor from the central core and activate the auto-destruct function. However, he is only successful in the former objective, as Magneto prevents him from fulfilling the latter, and Cable very nearly loses his life in a lopsided battle before teleporting himself out. The mutants Rusty and Skids, who were cured of their brainwashing at Stryfe's hands by Magneto, elect to stay aboard Avalon.

While the X-Men are burying Illyana Rasputin (who died from the Legacy Virus), Magneto and the Acolytes crash the funeral, stating their intentions to wipe out humanity from Avalon, their space station. Colossus, distraught over his sister's death and faltering in his faith in Professor X and his dream, joins Magneto and the Acolytes.

The UN Security Council activates the Magneto Protocols, which uses a network of satellites to create a barrier around the planet that will prevent Magneto from using his powers from within. Magneto retaliates by unleashing an electromagnetic pulse on the Earth that creates havoc on the world's electrical systems. Professor X dons a Shi'ar exoskeleton that enables him to walk, and assembles Jean Grey, Gambit, Rogue, Quicksilver, and Wolverine to go to Avalon and stop Magneto. Arriving via Shi'ar teleportation device, the team boards Avalon and disables the station with a virus created by Beast. Magneto engages the X-Men in battle, and in a fit of rage after nearly being gutted by Wolverine, tears the adamantium out of Wolverine's skeleton. Professor X, enraged by Magneto's actions, mindwipes Magneto, leaving him in a coma. The X-Men race back to Earth to treat Wolverine, while Colossus stays in a devastated Avalon to care for the comatose Magneto.

As the Blackbird returns to Earth, it runs into rough turbulence. Flashes of Wolverine's consciousness are shown as he struggles to stay alive. The X-Men on Earth watch in horror as the crew frantically tries to stabilize the ship and care for Wolverine. The ship's hatch opens, and Wolverine sees himself "going towards the light", but he is pushed back. He awakens in time to prevent Jean Grey from getting sucked out of the Blackbird. The X-Men land on the Earth safely. As Wolverine recovers from his injuries, he and the X-Men learn that his claws were a part of his actual skeletal structure all along, as he now possesses claws made of bone.

On Muir Island, the X-Men use Shadowcat to lure in Colossus in an effort to heal his head wound (caused by the X-Cutioner), which they believed was responsible for his defection. The ruse works, and while Nightcrawler fends off the Acolytes' attempts to reclaim their ally, Professor X and Moira MacTaggert heal Colossus using Cyclops' optic blast. Once again able to return to his human form, Colossus remains with the Acolytes to keep them in check. In the interim, Jean makes peace with her future-daughter, Rachel Grey.

== Aftermath ==
- This story leads directly into the Avengers/X-Men crossover "Bloodties".
- In wiping out Magneto's mind, Professor X unleashes an evil psychic entity, Onslaught, that festers in his own mind, leading to the Onslaught Saga of 1996.
- The mind-wiped Magneto did not return until 1997 in Uncanny X-Men #350.
- Wolverine lost his adamantium skeleton (and subsequently left the X-Men). He did not get it back until 1999, when Apocalypse rebonded it to his skeleton, shown through flashback sequences during Wolverine (vol. 2) #145. Genesis had attempted the same earlier, but did not succeed, in Wolverine (vol. 2) #100 (April 1996).
- With the team in shambles, the three remaining members of Excalibur (Nightcrawler, Shadowcat, and Rachel Grey) remain on Muir Island, abandoning their operations in England.
- After the destruction of Avalon, Colossus would later join Excalibur as part of his rehabilitation.
- Fabian Nicieza returned to this story in honor of the X-Men's 50th anniversary in the special anthology comic X-Men: Gold #1 (2013). In this short story, we see that while he was erasing Magneto's mind, Xavier gave him a final vision of a utopia that could have come to pass if the two of them had worked together.

== Tie-in issues ==
1. X-Factor #92
2. X-Force #25
3. Uncanny X-Men #304
4. X-Men (vol. 2) #25
5. Wolverine (vol. 2) #75
6. Excalibur #71

== Reception ==
Initial installments of "Fatal Attractions" sold higher than the issues of the participating series which preceded them, but noticeably less than previous X-Men crossovers. Wizard magazine speculated that this was due to fan disappointment with recent X-Men crossovers, such as X-Cutioner's Song.

== In other media ==
- Several elements of the Fatal Attractions storyline were influenced in the X-Men animated series. In the two-part episode "Sanctuary", Magneto creates Asteroid M, a human-free orbiting space station, though it was only Cortez who desired to use its weaponry to attack humans.
- Fatal Attractions was loosely adapted into a video game entitled X-Men: Children of the Atom in 1994. Much like the comic book storyline, Magneto plans to unleash an electromagnetic pulse on the Earth that will disrupt the magnetic fields and create havoc on the world's electrical systems, ushering in a Dark Age for the Earth's non-mutant population. Unlike the storyline, where Magneto has the Acolytes on his side, Omega Red, the Sentinels, Silver Samurai, Spiral, and Juggernaut joins forces with Magneto as he promises a mutant run planet.
- The fourth part of Fatal Attractions, X-Men (vol. 2) #25, was loosely adapted into the X-Men '97 episode, "Tolerance is Extinction – Part 2". When Magneto unleashed an electromagnetic pulse on the Earth to deactivate Bastion's Prime Sentinels, it also disrupted the magnetic fields and caused havoc on the world's electrical systems, ushering in a Dark Age for the Earth's non-mutant population. Rogue and Sunspot joined forces with Magneto as he promised a new home for mutants on Asteroid M as revenge for the Wild Sentinel massacre in Genosha. During the battle on the asteroid, when Wolverine stabbed Magneto, he used his powers to rip out all the adamantium from Wolverine's body.

== Collected editions ==
The story has been collected into a trade paperback

- X-Men: Fatal Attractions (January 1995, ISBN 0-7851-0065-2)

The story has been collected into an Omnibus hardcover

- X-Men: Fatal Attractions (816 pages, April 2012, ISBN 978-0785162452 )

Collecting: Uncanny X-Men 298–305, 315, Annual 17; X-Factor 87–92; X-Men Unlimited 1–2; X-Force 25; X-Men 25; Wolverine 75; Excalibur 65

Omnibus reprint, February 2025, ISBN 978-1302963507
