= Locus (comics) =

Publication information
- Publisher: Marvel Comics
- First appearance: X-Force #27 (1993)
- Created by: Fabian Nicieza and Matt Broome

In-story information
- Alter ego: Rayna Piper
- Species: Human mutant
- Team affiliations: Mutant Liberation Front
- Abilities: Teleportation, Self-levitation

Locus is the name of two fictional characters appearing in American comic books published by Marvel Comics. The first one, whose real name is Aaron Verne, originally appeared in Thor #302 (Dec. 1980), and has the ability to create geometric energy constructs.

The second one is a mutant villainess. She was first introduced as a member of the Mutant Liberation Front in the comic title X-Force under the leadership of Reignfire.

== Fictional character biography ==
In the aftermath of the storyline "X-Cutioner's Song", the members of the Mutant Liberation Front (MLF) are imprisoned. Reignfire breaks Forearm, Reaper, Wildside, and Tempo out of prison and recruits new members Locus and Moonstar to join them. The team is sent to kill Henry Peter Gyrich, an anti-mutant government liaison. Sunspot stops Locus from killing Gyrich, but their powers unexpectedly react to each other, causing them both to disappear. Cable and X-Force search tirelessly to find Locus and Sunspot, but are unsuccessful. Six months later, Locus mysteriously appears at X-Force's base, claiming to have been to the furthest reaches of space.

In a later appearance, the MLF is trying to steal data on the Legacy Virus from a government institution that is attempting to manufacture their own strain of the disease. They infiltrate the building and take the scientists hostage, but are stopped by X-Force. Three of the scientists reveal themselves to be Prime Sentinels and attack the group. X-Force, Moonstar, and Forearm escape, while Locus and the remaining members of the MLF are captured.

Weapon X attempts to recruit Locus, seeing her abilities as useful to them. Sabretooth, having learned of Weapon X's intentions, kills Locus out of spite towards the group. In X-Men (vol. 7), Locus appears alive as a member of the Hellions.

== Powers and abilities ==
Locus has the ability to teleport herself, other people, or objects she is in physical contact with to anywhere that she, or they, have been before. She also has the ability to levitate and fire energy blasts.
