= Forearm (disambiguation) =

Forearm may refer to:

- Forearm, the structure and distal region of the upper limb
- Forearm (firearm component), the component of a firearm between the receiver and the muzzle
- Forearm (comics), a fictional Marvel villain also known as Michael McCain
