= Messiah War =

2009 Marvel Comics storyline

- Cover of X-Force/Cable:Messiah War TPB Dec, 2009; Featuring Cable, Deadpool & Domino, art by Ariel Olivetti
- Publisher: Marvel Comics
- Publication date: May – July 2009
- Genre: Superhero; Crossover
Title(s)
Cable vol. 2, #13-15
X-Force vol. 3, #14–16
X-Force/Cable: Messiah War #1
X-Men: Future History - The Messiah War Sourcebook #1
X-Men: The Times and Life of Lucas Bishop #1-3
- Main character(s): X-Force; Cable; Hope Summers; Stryfe; Bishop; Deadpool; Apocalypse

Creative team
- Writer(s): Craig Kyle; Christopher Yost; Duane Swierczynski
- Penciller(s): Mike Choi; Clayton Crain; Ariel Olivetti
- Colorist: Sonia Oback
- Hardcover: ISBN 0-7851-3157-4

"Messiah War" is a crossover storyline running through the issues of Cable and X-Force cover-dated May– July 2009 and a one-shot, X-Force/Cable: Messiah War, published by Marvel Comics. Writer Craig Kyle described it as the follow-up to Messiah Complex and "the middle chapter of what I think will be a major three-part saga, which will continue to define and redefine the X-Universe moving forward". The final chapter is X-Men: Second Coming.

== Publication history ==
The storyline began with a one-shot, X-Force/Cable: Messiah War, and the story runs through the following three months in Cable #13–15 and X-Force #14–16.

== Plot ==
Cyclops sends X-Force into the timestream in pursuit of Cable and Hope Summers, shortening their operation against the Leper Queen despite Wolverine's protests. X-Force arrives in 2973, with 32 1/2 hours to complete their mission before their time-travel devices kill them. Although Elixir removes his time-band, he does not return to the present. As Vanisher discovers his teleportation powers have failed, he is shot by a sniper (the future Deadpool). X-Force takes Deadpool in search of Cable, whom X-23 tracks to UN Headquarters. Wolverine finds Hope, and is held at gunpoint by Cable. When the team finds them, Cable tells X-Force that they are trapped and shows them the fortress of Apocalypse in the distance.

Deadpool tells X-Force and Cable his 900-year story; Stryfe, not Apocalypse, rules this future. Cable refuses to believe this, and they are ambushed by Stryfe's soldiers. Stryfe has an alliance with Bishop, who agreed to help him kill Apocalypse in exchange for his aid in killing Cable. As X-Force overcomes Stryfe's troops, Archangel flies into the distance. Domino grows suspicious of Deadpool, who says that Stryfe just launched from his citadel and is about to kill them. Archangel investigates a cave and discovers a severely-injured Apocalypse.

X-Force and Cable unsuccessfully battle Stryfe. Cable detonates explosives which destroy the cliff, but Stryfe captures Hope and Warpath. Warpath is tortured; Bishop neutralizes Stryfe with nanomachines and tries to kill Hope, but Stryfe subdues him. X-Force splits into two teams: Wolverine, Elixir and Cable go to confront Stryfe, while Domino, X-23, Vanisher and Deadpool search for what is keeping X-Force trapped in the future.

Warpath unsuccessfully attacks Stryfe when he sees him with Hope. Stryfe awaits the arrival of Cable, who is quickly defeated. He realizes the purpose of the attack: to cloak Wolverine, who attacks him. Elixir tries his death touch on Stryfe, who subdues them with his telekinesis (forcing Elixir to heal him and Wolverine to stab himself). In the cave Archangel decides against killing Apocalypse, who suggests that they kill Stryfe.

Domino, X-23, Vanisher and Deadpool find what is keeping X-Force from returning to the present: Kiden Nixon, strapped to a device in Graymalkin which uses her time-manipulation powers to keep Stryfe's fortress out of the timestream. Deadpool says that he will save the "annoying messiah kid" and leaves. Cable and Bishop recover from Stryfe's assault and fight until Bishop leaves Cable to battle a brain-damaged Wolverine. As Bishop confronts Stryfe and Hope, Wolverine attacks Stryfe. Deadpool arrives with a laser cannon and blasts him off the platform. As Wolverine recovers and Deadpool celebrates, Stryfe returns and rips Deadpool in half. Archangel returns Apocalypse to his fortress, and they go to confront Stryfe.

As Wolverine, Elixir, Warpath and Cable prepare to battle Stryfe, the time-travel devices reach 0:00 and try to pull X-Force into the present. Kiden is still alive and connected to Graymalkin, so X-Force remains in the future. Domino kills Kiden despite X-23's protests, and Vanisher removes his time band to return to the present. The rest remain to help Cable, who battles Stryfe until Archangel and Apocalypse arrive. Apocalypse declares the Age of Stryfe over. Bishop makes a final attempt to kill Hope, but is stopped by Cable. As Apocalypse and Archangel defeat Stryfe, Bishop escapes into the timestream. Apocalypse senses power in Hope and deems her worthy of hosting his essence, but Angel demands he return her in return for sparing his life. Apocalypse gives Hope to Cable, warning him that emotion will be their undoing. As X-Force leaves the citadel, Apocalypse teleports away with Stryfe.

As Cable and Hope jump into the timestream, X-Force remains. Wolverine, Archangel and Elixir head to the United Nations, where they hope to find Hellion and Surge when they return to the present. As they remove their time bands, Domino and X-23 struggle to return to the building where Boom-Boom was held by the Leper Queen. Domino goes blind and X-23, realizing that Domino is doomed, removes her time band and vows that she will save Boom-Boom. X-23 crawls to her destination and, prepared to kill the Leper Queen, removes her time band to return to the present.

== Story order ==
- Prologue: The Times and Life of Lucas Bishop #1–3
- Chapter 1: X-Force/Cable: Messiah War (one-shot)
- Chapter 2: Cable #13
- Chapter 3: X-Force #14
- Chapter 4: Cable #14
- Chapter 5: X-Force #15
- Chapter 6: Cable #15
- Chapter 7: X-Force #16

== Collected editions ==
The story event has been collected into the following trade paperbacks.

Title	Material collected	Publication Date	ISBN
Cable: The Last Hope, Volume 1	Cable (vol. 2) #1–12; King-Sized Cable; X-Men: The Life and Times of Lucas Bishop #1-3; X-Men: Future History - The Messiah War Sourcebook	April 2018	1-302-91216-X (softcover)
Cable: The Last Hope, Volume 2	Cable (vol. 2) #13-24; Deadpool & Cable #25; X-Force/Cable: Messiah War #1; X-Force (vol.3) #14-16; X-Men: Hope #1	December 2018	1-302-91394-8 (softcover)
Cable, Volume 1: Messiah War	Cable (vol. 2) #1–5	January 2009	0-7851-3226-0 (hardcover); 0-7851-2973-1 (softcover)
X-Force/Cable: Messiah War	Cable (vol. 2) #11–15; Messiah War one-shot; X-Force (vol. 3) #14–16; X-Men: The Times and Life of Lucas Bishop #1–3; X-Men: Future History – The Messiah War Sourcebook	August 2009	0-7851-3157-4 (hardcover); 0-7851-3173-6 (softcover)
