= Reignfire =

- Cover to X-Force #43 featuring Reignfire and Moonstar.

Publication information
- Publisher: Marvel Comics
- First appearance: X-Force #26 (September 1993)
- Created by: Fabian Nicieza & Matt Broome

In-story information
- Species: Human Mutant, clone
- Team affiliations: Mutant Liberation Front
- Notable aliases: Sunspot, Project Nineteen
- Abilities: Solar absorption and rechanneling Superhuman strength Flight; Projection of heat and light as concussive blasts or in a stream of fiery rain Telepathic link with genetic host

Reignfire is a fictional character and villain appearing in American comic books published by Marvel Comics. The character primarily appeared in the series X-Force. His original creators were Fabian Nicieza and Matt Broome, who had completely different plans for the villain than what evolved.

== Publication history ==
Originally, Fabian Nicieza intended for Reignfire to be a time traveling, slightly older, more mentally disturbed version of Sunspot. When writer John Francis Moore took over the title X-Force, he changed the original plan and made Sunspot a protoplasmic entity who took Sunspot's form.

== Fictional character biography ==
Following the events of "X-Cutioner's Song", the members of the Mutant Liberation Front (MLF) are imprisoned and left without a leader. Reignfire frees MLF members Forearm, Reaper, Wildside, and Tempo from prison and recruits Moonstar and Locus into the group. He tasks the group with killing Henry Peter Gyrich, an anti-mutant government liaison. However, their attempt is foiled by X-Force. During the battle, Locus and Sunspot are teleported away after their powers inadvertently react with one another.

During a later battle, Reignfire removes his mask and reveals himself to be the missing Sunspot. Cable uses his telepathy to suppress the Reignfire persona in Sunspot, which inadvertently gives Sunspot knowledge of Askani—Cable's religion and language.

Sunspot goes to visit his friend and former New Mutants teammate Skids in Colorado when the pair are attacked by Locus and Reignfire. Reignfire reveals that he was originally a protoplasmic entity in the possession of the Celestials who gained Sunspot's appearance and powers after being given a sample of his blood by Gideon. While close to Sunspot, Reignfire is able to telepathically link with him and manipulate his actions.

Reignfire later appears back on the Celestials' ship, which is attacked by X-Force. After a battle, Reignfire is crushed to death by a Celestial golem.

== Powers and abilities ==
As a clone of Sunspot, Reignfire shared all of his abilities: absorption rechanneling of solar energy, either within his own body or externally, to create multiple abilities including, super strength, thermal updrafts for flight, projection of heat and light as concussive blasts or in a stream of fiery rain, and the ability to forge a telepathic link with his genetic host and psychically imprint himself onto his brain.
