= Cable and X-Force =

Comic book

- Cover of Cable and X-Force (February 2013). Art by Salvador Larroca.

Publication information
- Publisher: Marvel Comics
- Schedule: Monthly
- Genre: Superhero
- Publication date: February 2013 – March 2014
- No. of issues: 19
- Main character: X-Force

Creative team
- Created by: Dennis Hopeless; Salvador Larroca
- Written by: Dennis Hopeless
- Artist: Salvador Larroca

Cable and X-Force was an ongoing comic book series published by Marvel Comics that began in February 2013, as part of Marvel NOW! The series finds Cable awakening after Avengers vs. X-Men and on the run with his new team of X-Force from the Uncanny Avengers. The series was replaced by X-Force Volume 4.

== Publication history ==
In mid-September, 2012, Marvel Comics announced that a new title Cable and X-Force would be published in December, headed by the creative team of Dennis Hopeless and Salvador Larroca. The series harkens back to the early days of the original X-Force: Cable leads a fugitive team consisting of Domino, Colossus, Forge and Doctor Nemesis, against the newly formed Uncanny Avengers, led by Cable's uncle, Havok. Hope Summers has a penchant for showing up in the series, as she is Cable's de facto daughter - several issues, including #005, give much attention to Hope on her journey to rejoin her father and his new X-Force team.

As part of the "All-New Marvel NOW!" campaign, a new volume of X-Force was launched in February 2014, replacing Cable and X-Force and Uncanny X-Force vol.2. It features a team of Cable, Psylocke, Fantomex, and Marrow, written by X-Men: Legacy writer Simon Spurrier.

== Plot summary ==
=== Volume 1 ===
Cable seeks the help of Doctor Nemesis because of the headaches and visions he has been having. He builds him a mechanical arm, since his left arm atrophied due to lack of use all the time. It was metal from the techno-organic virus. He cannot fix his metal eye, so he covers it with an eye patch. Cable is then able to help Forge cure his mental illness by using his telepathic powers. Hope teams up with Domino in order to find Cable, who has been missing since the events of "Messiah Complex". After being reunited with one another, Cable and Hope both share a vision in which a tanker hits the shore in Miami Beach and from which a mysterious mass comes out.

A few days later, Havok finds Cable and his team surrounded by multiple dead bodies. He then tries to confront them about the massacre but instead of explaining himself, Cable uses a teleportation gate and disappears. After running away from the Avengers, Colossus get into an argument with Cable about the fact that they had to kill the workers in the facility. Some days earlier, Domino saves people from the mysterious mass in Miami Beach by teaming up with Hope. After getting a sample of the mass, as instructed by Doctor Nemesis, she manages to destroy it by using Forge's antidote. Meanwhile, Cable undergoes brain surgery and it turns out that despite the fact that he woke up; his brain is still swelling which could lead to a potential death. Despite the warnings of his teammates, and especially Domino, Cable goes to deal with a threat he sensed with the help of Colossus.

Following a vision about a virus called the Girth – which attacks only humans and mutates them into monsters – Cable prepares an attack on the Eat-More main processing facility, which is where he believes the virus originates from. Teresa Payton, an outspoken anti-mutant and Eat-More's owner, sends her men to capture Forge as he tries to hack Eat-More's HQ. He later finds out that Teresa lost her daughter during Xorn's attack on New York which is why she has been so vocal against mutant's rights; however, she is not the one who created the virus. Forge manages to escape and returns to his team and back at X-Force's headquarters, Domino takes Hope back to her home through the teleportation gate but the gate unexpectedly breaks down, trapping Domino on the other side. Cable and Doctor Nemesis then go straight to the Eat-More facility in order to destroy the virus but find Colossus fighting Girth mutants when they arrive.

After dealing with the Girth-mutated workers, the team finds out that they are too late from preventing the food trucks containing the virus from leaving but Domino, who mysteriously returns from Hope's house, manages to take out the trucks and rejoins the rest of the team. Doctor Nemesis, who had been trying to find a cure to the virus the entire time, realizes that his attempts have backfired because the victims only became even more dangerous. The only option left is to not only destroy the virus but also kill the infected men. Despite Colossus' protests, Cable orders him to carry out the kill-order. The authorities, including Havok and his Uncanny Avengers, only arrived after all the workers’ mutated bodies morphed back to their regular human forms and were strewn dead across the floor. After destroying the headquarters and using the teleportation gate to run away from Havok and his team, X-Force decides to split up and reunite later on.

Cable then visits Hope to explain to her that she cannot come with him because it is too dangerous and that all he ever wanted for her was to have a normal life. After leaving to rejoin to the rest of the X-Force, now in Mexico, he has another vision of an upcoming threat; a threat that he and his team are all ready to stop.

=== Volume 2 ===
The team split up waiting for Cable to call them again. Doctor Nemesis and Forge hide out in a junk yard and find new challenges to pass the time, like arcade games and battling giant robots. Domino and Colossus hid out in a bar, but eventually spend the night together. The next morning Colossus is racked with guilt over the deaths of the Eat More worker, so he turns himself into S.H.I.E.L.D., who lock him up in the Raft. Cable gets another premonition and tries to get the team back together. The team with a distraction created by Boom Boom break into The Raft, but not to free Colossus, but to free an alien named Kliktok. Doctor Nemesis, Domino, Boom Boom, and Forge are trapped on a spaceship with Kliktok, who turns out to be an interstellar genocidal murderer. Cable and Colossus are able to convince Abigail Brand that they freed Kliktok since in three days an alien armada was going to invade Earth in order to get revenge on Kliktok. Brand agrees to help free X-Force before the armada destroys their ship. Colossus is able to launch himself into the alien ship and free the team, but they them maroon Brand since they won't turn themselves in. Brand ask the Avengers to track Cable and Hope Summers. Havok, Captain America, and Rogue track Hope to a bus station. The noticed that she shook off their tail and was missing for one hour. It turns out she visited Pace Federal Penitentiary and stole the powers of Purple Woman and Lady Mastermind, which she uses to create a diversion in order to escape and track down her father.

=== Volume 3 ===
Cable and his team are resting at the Cheyenne Indian reservation in Southern Montana. He has been crippled by his premonitions. Domino suggests he delegate some authority and split the team up instead of burdening all the responsibilities. He agrees, but just then the Uncanny Avengers show up. The team splits up, but Cable is captured. Boom-Boom and Domino go to a hospital to remove a mutant before his power manifest and hurt others. Then they join Colossus in Switzerland to prevent a demon from crossing into our realm. Lastly the team joins up with Doctor Nemesis and Forge in Lisbon to defeat a giant mutant monster. They then regroup and attack the Avengers Mansion to rescue Cable, but are quickly outmatched and defeated. Not known to the team, but Hope Summers sought out the Blaquesmith to learn about her father's premonitions. He teleports her to the future and meets with a female Stryfe, who used a Deathlok cyborg to channel vision of the future into Cable to prevent a dystopian future of indestructible human cyborgs. It turns out Stryfe is actually Hope Summers, who wanted to change the future, but also end Cable's retirement from being a hero, so he will include Hope in his adventures. He actually did not include her and it is driving him crazy. Hope returns into the past with Stryfe's psimitar, which breaks his link to the future. Cable is able to project to Havok his premonitions. Havok agrees that the Avengers can't be everywhere at once and sometimes won't always do what is necessary, even if it means endangering some lives to save many more, so Havok agrees to allow Cable and his X-Force to escape.

=== Volume 4 ===
X-Force is split into two teams, with Hope and Cable battling The Reavers and Domino and Colossus breaking into a Trask base guarded by a sentinel. Forge is supposed to be coordinating the fire teams, but is possessed by a demon known as The Adversary. Boom-Boom distracts the demon who cannot escape the underground bunker because it is made of steel, while Doctor Nemesis teleports into Forge's subconscious. Forge urges him to teleport back and kill his body before the demon escapes, but Nemesis refuses to kill Forge and instead teleports himself, Forge, and the Adversary into his own subconscious and traps the Adversary. Then Hope views one of Cable's premonitions and sneaks out of the bunker in search of Bishop, who is now part of the Uncanny X-Force. She is not aware that Bishop has traveled back into the future in penance for terrorizing Cable and Hope while she grew up in a parallel time line. The two X-Force teams battle to protect their comrades, but Stryfe interrupts and kidnaps Bishop and Hope. Spiral is able to teleport Cable to Stryfe, but since Stryfe is an omega-level telepath and Cable lost his telepathy, Spiral is forced to teleport herself away and Cable is held prisoner. Stryfe attempts to prove to Cable that he did a poor job of raising Hope by manipulating her into killing Bishop. Nemesis and Forge create a Cerebro out of junkyard parts and use Psylocke's telepathy to track down Spiral and Stryfe's base. Stryfe thinks he's won when Hope stabs Bishop, but she carefully strikes to miss all vital organs. Stryke thinks he mentally broke Cable and quickly dispatches both X-Force teams, until Cable stabs him. Stryfe then imbues Hope with his powers before teleporting away. Hope is now a mutant bomb. Bishop then uses his powers to adsorb her kinetic energy and saves the team. The Uncanny X-Force disbands and Psylocke joins Cable's new X-Force.

== Characters ==
=== X-Men ===
- Cable (Nathan Summers), protagonist of the series and time-travelling son of the X-Men's leader Cyclops. Cable (Nathan Christopher Charles Summers) is a powerful telepath and telekinesist who has been infected with a deadly techno-organic virus at a young age. He founded a new X-Force team, destined to face the threats that he saw in his visions.
- Domino (Neena Thurman), is a skilled mutant mercenary possessing mutant probability-altering powers, powers that she has been using when she was a member of several X-Men teams. Not only is she now the lieutenant of Cable's X-Force team, she is also his partner, confidante and lover.
- Colossus (Piotr Nikolaievitch Rasputin) is a Russian mutant with the ability to transform his body into “organic steel”, which grants him not only stamina and durability but also superhuman strength. He joined Cable's X-Force team after losing control of his powers as a result of losing the Phoenix Force during the Avengers vs. X-Men arc. In order for him to stabilize his condition, Cable provided him a device that controls his powers.
- Forge is a mutant with the ability to create any kind of mechanic or electronic system as well as the ability to “see” the mechanic energy. He is also a Cheyenne with natural mystical abilities. He joined the team after creating a cybernetic arm for Cable who in return used his telepathic abilities to cure Forge's insanity.
- Doctor Nemesis (James Bradley) is a mutant with the ability to extend his longevity and enhance his immune system but also a highly skilled scientist and physician.
- Boom-Boom (Tabitha Smith) is a mutant with the ability to create yellow bombs of psionic energy that explode upon impact. During the series, she helps her friend and old teammate Domino to infiltrate a S.W.O.R.D base.

=== Supporting characters ===
- Hope Summers is the first mutant born after the events of M-Day. She is believed to be the mutant messiah and has the ability to mimic any mutant ability. Because she has been raised by him, she is determined to find Cable and do so with the help of Domino.
- Havok (Alex Summers) is the X-Men leader's Scott Summers younger brother and a mutant with the ability to absorb cosmic energy (such as stellar energy, X-rays or gamma radiation) to generate powerful plasma blasts. He is also immune to the heat that his power generates as well as his brother's Cyclop's optic blasts. He is the leader of the Uncanny Avengers, a team constituted of X-Men and Avengers and who will hunt down Cable's team.

== Roster ==
Issues	Team roster
#1 - 5 (Feb 2013–May 2013)	Cable, Colossus, Doctor Nemesis, Domino, Forge, Hope Summers
#6 - 19 (May 2013–Mar 2014)	Boom-Boom, Cable, Colossus, Doctor Nemesis, Domino, Forge, Hope Summers

== Collected Editions ==
#	Title	Material collected	Pages	Publication date	ISBN
1	Wanted	Cable and X-Force #1–5, and material from Marvel Now! Point One	136	May 14, 2013	978-0785166900
2	Dead or Alive	Cable and X-Force #6-9	96	November 19, 2013	978-0785166917
3	This Won't End Well	Cable and X-Force #10-14	112	February 18, 2014	978-0785188827
4	Vendetta	Cable and X-Force #15-19, Uncanny X-Force (vol. 2) #16-17	152	April 15, 2014	978-0785189466
