= Skids (character) =

Marvel Comics character

- Skids. Art by Salvador Larroca.

Publication information
- Publisher: Marvel Comics
- First appearance: X-Factor #7 (August 1986)
- Created by: Louise Simonson; Jackson Guice

In-story information
- Alter ego: Sally Blevins
- Species: Human Mutant
- Team affiliations: Morlocks; The 198; Acolytes; New Mutants; Mutant Liberation Front; X-Terminators; X-Corporation; S.H.I.E.L.D.
- Abilities: Force field generation

Skids (Sally Blevins) is a mutant character appearing in American comic books published by Marvel Comics. Created by Louise Simonson and Jackson Guice, the character debuted in X-Factor #7 (May 1986). Skids has a personal frictionless forcefield which she can project onto herself and other objects.

Skids was initially a ward of X-Factor, progressing to the X-Terminators and New Mutants. She would then join the villainous groups, Mutant Liberation Front and Acolytes, before defecting back to heroics with X-Corporation and S.H.I.E.L.D.

== Publication history ==
Created by writer Louise Simonson and artist Jackson Guice, Skids first appeared in X-Factor #7 (August 1986), first as one of the Morlocks, and then as a young ward of X-Factor. She remained as a supporting character through X-Factor #33, and a main character in X-Terminators #1-4 (1988). After Inferno, Skids joined the remaining members of the New Mutants in The New Mutants #76, but leaves the title as a regular after joining the Mutant Liberation Front with Rusty in New Mutants #87 (1990).

Skids would then leave regular publication but appear semi-regularly as an antagonist to the X-Men and X-Force, originally with the MLF in X-Men (vol. 2) #13-15 (1992), and later with the Acolytes in X-Men (vol. 2) #25 (1993). Skids then left the Acolytes and appeared infrequently in publication, only in isolated stories: as a college student in X-Force #78-80, 85 (1998–99), a member of the X-Corporation in X-Treme X-Men #42-46 (2004), one of The 198 in X-Men (vol. 2) #183-184 (2006), and as a S.H.I.E.L.D. agent infiltrating the Morlocks in The Uncanny X-Men #487-491 (2007).

== Fictional character biography ==
=== Morlocks ===
Sally Blevins was abused by her stepfather as a teenager. Her mother Matilda was fatally injured in an altercation with him, and her stepfather fled when Sally's mutant power manifested to protect her. Sally ends up a runaway and comes to live with the Morlocks, a group of homeless mutants. Masque, a Morlock who can shape the bodies of others, tries to forcibly give Sally an inhuman appearance, but her force field protects her from Masque's power, leading to resentment from some Morlocks. Skids later encounters Rusty Collins while he is being pursued by Freedom Force and a mob of mutant-hating humans, after accidentally injuring a woman with his pyrokinetic powers. The pair are confronted by Freedom Force at Central Park, but are saved by X-Factor.

=== X-Factor, X-Terminators, and New Mutants ===
Skids and Rusty are one of several trainees under X-Factor's mentorship, with the group eventually forming the X-Terminators. The X-Terminators team up with the New Mutants to help rescue mutant babies from the demon N'astirh, who was using them to help keep open a portal to Limbo. Following the battle, Skids joins the New Mutants, along with Rusty, Rictor, and Boom Boom.

Rusty and Skids are later captured and imprisoned by Freedom Force. The pair are later freed by the Mutant Liberation Front.

=== Mutant Liberation Front ===
Rusty and Skids are brainwashed by Stryfe into following him blindly. The two are kidnapped by the Friends of Humanity, but are rescued by X-Force. X-Force and the pair are confronted by Exodus, who takes them all to Avalon.

=== Avalon ===
Upon arriving in Avalon, the mutants are taken to Magneto, who undoes the brainwashing done to Rusty and Skids. When X-Force arrive to save their friends, Rusty and Skids decide to stay with Magneto and join his Acolytes, indebted to him.

Shortly afterward, the body of Holocaust is discovered floating in space near Avalon and brought on board. Rusty is assigned to guard Holocaust's body, but is killed after he suddenly reawakens. Holocaust destroys Avalon. Skids is rescued by Jean Grey, who coaches Skids to keep Avalon together with her forcefield, and is taken to the X-Men's mansion for medical attention.

=== College ===
Skids begins attending college, where she studies biological sciences. At this time, X-Force is attacked by Reignfire, leader of the Mutant Liberation Front. During the encounter, Skids' force field disrupts the teleportation abilities of MLF member Locus, causing both of them to be transported them to Latveria, where they are captured by sorceress Pandemonia. The two defeat her with the assistance of X-Force and the young sorceress Jennifer Kale.

=== X-Corporation ===
Skids joins the Los Angeles branch of the X-Corporation (a worldwide network supporting mutant causes). This faction assists the X-Treme X-Men after Elias Bogan takes mental possession of some of their members. Shortly afterwards, X-Corp founder Charles Xavier has the network disbanded for its members' safety.

=== M-Day ===
Skids is among the few mutants who retain their powers after M-Day. Skids seeks refuge on Xavier's estate, sharing a tent with Magma and Outlaw. She eventually leaves the camp and is not seen for some time.

=== S.H.I.E.L.D. ===
Skids becomes an agent of S.H.I.E.L.D. and is assigned to infiltrate Masque's sect Morlocks, who attempt to carry out the designs of the late Morlock precognitive Qwerty.. She is unable to interfere with the Morlock's villainous schemes. She later fills the X-Men in on her assignment and Qwerty's prophecies. After the X-Men defeat Masque, Skids leaves with Qwerty's book.

She is later caught up in a plot involving Hawkeye and Black Widow. She later joins Krakoa and S.W.O.R.D.

== Powers and abilities ==
Sally Blevins using her powers

Sally Blevins is a mutant who possesses a protective field around her body that provides nearly total protection from all attacks except those of insufficient force, like gas. Her force field disperses energy assaults, reflects kinetic impact off itself, and negates friction, making her impossible to grab. Skids can move at high speeds by "skating" the surface of her force field across other surfaces.

Originally, Sally was unable to turn off her force field but learned with practice. By concentrating, she can extend her force field to protect others in her immediate area, at least up to 30 cubic feet (0.85 m^{3}).

== Other versions ==
=== Age of Apocalypse ===
An alternate universe version of Skids appears in Age of Apocalypse (2005). This version is a former prisoner of Apocalypse who founded a new version of the Morlocks.

== In other media ==
- Skids makes a non-speaking appearance in the X-Men: The Animated Series episode "No Mutant is an Island" as a mutant recruited by the Purple Man.
  - Skids makes a non-speaking appearance in X-Men '97 episode "Strange Land, Savage Heart" as a member of the Acolytes.
  - Skids appears in the X-Men '97 tie-in comic.
- Sally Blevins appears in Marvel's Wolverine as a member of the Morlocks.
