= Legacy Virus =

Fictional plague appearing in Marvel Comics

The Legacy Virus is a fictional plague appearing in American comic books featuring the X-Men published by Marvel Comics. It first appeared in an eponymous storyline in Marvel Comics titles, from 1993 to 2001, during which it swept through the mutant population of the Marvel Universe, killing hundreds, as well as mutating so that it affected humans as well.

== Description ==
The Legacy Virus is a viroid released by Stryfe, a terrorist and clone of Cable from 2,000 years in the future. It originally exists in two forms, Legacy-1 and Legacy-2, which specifically affect mutants and kill the infected by preventing their body from producing healthy cells. Legacy-3 was accidentally created after Legacy-2 infected Infectia, a mutant with the ability to visualize and alter the genetic structure of others. Infectia's powers caused a replication error that removed the viroid's conditioning to infect individuals only if the X-gene was present and allowed it to infect humans.

The Legacy Virus is strongly suggested to be an allegory for the AIDS epidemic. Although all strains of the Legacy Virus are more dangerous than HIV, they share similar symptoms such as lesions, fever, fatigue, and coughing. In addition, comics featuring the Legacy Virus illustrate the similar social impact of the further isolation of a stigmatized group.

== History ==
The Legacy Virus first appeared in X-Force #18. It is based on a virus created by Apocalypse in the distant future, which was intended to kill the remaining non-mutants. At the time that this version of Apocalypse was killed, the virus had not been perfected, and much like Legacy-3, it targeted all humans indiscriminately. As a result, this virus was not deployed until Stryfe acquired and modified it for his own purposes.

During the X-Cutioner's Song storyline, Stryfe gives Mister Sinister a canister containing the Legacy Virus. Gordon Lefferts, a scientist working for Sinister, opens the canister after Stryfe is apparently killed by Cable, releasing the virus. The virus kills various mutants, including Magik, Mastermind, and Pyro, before Moira MacTaggert and Beast develop a cure. However, the cure will kill whoever activates it. Colossus, not wanting any more people to suffer his sister Magik's fate, sneaks into Beast's lab and sacrifices himself by injecting the cure into his body. This stops the spread of the virus and instantaneously cures everyone who is already infected.

The Legacy Virus returns in X-Force (2009), with Bastion having obtained a sample. Bastion and the Leper Queen infect Beautiful Dreamer and Fever Pitch with the virus, causing them to go berserk and kill themselves and thousands of civilians during an anti-mutant rally. Hellion and Surge are also infected, but are cured by Elixir.

In Deadpool/Wolverine (2025), Stryfe creates a new version of the Legacy Virus that enables him to control the minds of those affected.

== Other versions ==
The Ultimate Marvel universe version of the Legacy Virus is created by Nick Fury in an attempt to replicate the Super Soldier experiment that created Captain America. The virus turns normal humans into super-strong beings, but is fatal to mutants, prompting Fury to hold Beast in S.H.I.E.L.D. custody to coerce him to find a cure for it in the event of an outbreak.

== In other media ==
=== Television ===
The Legacy Virus appears in the X-Men: The Animated Series episode "Time Fugitives". This version was developed by Graydon Creed and Apocalypse.

=== Video games ===
- The Legacy Virus appears in X-Men 2: Game Master's Legacy.
- The Legacy Virus appears in Marvel: Ultimate Alliance. Research data on the Legacy Virus is held in a S.H.I.E.L.D. Omega Base computer which is being attacked by deformed super soldiers. If the data is saved, it will be used to create a cure and stop the plague. If it is not, the Legacy Virus spreads rampantly, dooming mutants to extinction.
