= Tempo (character) =

- Tempo as an Acolyte

Publication information
- Publisher: Marvel Comics
- First appearance: New Mutants #86 (February 1990)
- Created by: Louise Simonson; Rob Liefeld

In-story information
- Alter ego: Heather Tucker
- Species: Human mutant
- Team affiliations: Mutant Liberation Front; Marauders; Acolytes
- Notable aliases: Harriet Solomon
- Abilities: Flight; Time manipulation

Tempo (Heather Tucker) is a fictional character appearing in American comic books published by Marvel Comics. She was introduced as a member of the Mutant Liberation Front in New Mutants #86 (February 1990), by Louise Simonson and Rob Liefeld.

Tempo is an African-American mutant with the ability to manipulate time and fly. She is briefly a member of the Acolytes and later joins the Marauders during the Krakoan Age.

== Publication history ==
Tempo first appeared in New Mutants #86. Tempo would appear as a member of the Mutant Liberation Front throughout the 90s in titles such as X-Force and X-Factor. During the Krakoan Age, she appeared in the second volume of Marauders as a main character and in the supporting cast of Bishop: War College.

== Fictional character biography ==
Tempo (alter ego Heather Tucker) is a founding member of the terrorist organization known as the Mutant Liberation Front (MLF). Tempo is a mainstay in the team, and had a strong relationship with fellow member, Sumo.

The MLF destroy the Tucker Clinic, an institute for pregnant mothers to undergo prenatal DNA testing to determine whether or not their babies would be mutants, resulting in the death of Dr. Tucker. The story hints that Tempo may have been his daughter.

Soon after, Reignfire reforms the MLF and tasks them with killing Henry Peter Gyrich, an anti-mutant government liaison. Tempo intervenes to save Gyrich and is exiled from the MLF. Cable invites Tempo to join X-Force, but she declines, choosing instead to go to college and put aside the super-powered lifestyle. She is again briefly affiliated with the MLF during "Operation: Zero Tolerance".

After M-Day, Tempo is one of the few to retain her powers. She then becomes a member of the reformed Acolytes. When they disband, she joins her fellow mutants in Utopia.

In Age of X, Tempo is transformed into a soldier of Fortress X. Tempo is fatally wounded while battling humans, but before she dies Legacy absorbs her memories.

During the Krakoan Age, Tempo is resurrected and joins Kitty Pryde's Marauders. She is also established to have been in a relationship with Bouncer (Renata Da Lima) before they broke up.

Tempo was a part of the vote for being a new member of the X-Men, but did not win.

== Powers and abilities ==
Tempo can manipulate time. She is able to slow or stop her opponents and speed up either herself or her teammates. She has prevented grenades from exploding by keeping them in suspended motion, and was also able to successfully attack Rogue by amplifying Rogue's speed, causing her to crash into a wall while flying.

Strain limits how long Tempo can maintain a major time manipulation. While it was never established how long that limit is, she was able to completely freeze the X-Men for several minutes while she and the Acolytes conducted a thorough search of the X-Men mansion. Tempo can also levitate herself and fly at subsonic speeds.

Besides offering her physical protection, Tempo's helmet also contains electronic equipment that provides her with resistance to Cable's telepathic probes.
