= ForgetMeNot (Xabi) =

Marvel Comics superhero

Publication information
- Publisher: Marvel Comics
- First appearance: X-Men: Legacy #300 (March 2014)
- Created by: Christos Gage; Mike Carey; Simon Spurrier

In-story information
- Alter ego: Xabi
- Species: Human mutant
- Team affiliations: X-Men; X-Force; Legionaries; X-Factor
- Partnerships: Juggernaut
- Abilities: Being forgotten Technological undetection

ForgetMeNot (Xabi) is a superhero appearing in American comic books published by Marvel Comics. He first appeared in X-Men: Legacy #300 (March 2014), and was created by Mike Carey, Simon Spurrier and Christos Gage.

== Publication history ==
In March 2014, ForgetMeNot debuted in X-Men: Legacy #300 as the member of X-Men. He was created by writers Mike Carey, Simon Spurrier and Christos Gage. Spurrier also used the character during X-Force (vol. 4) and Legion of X.

== Fictional character biography ==
ForgetMeNot was a member of X-Men before the events of X-Men: Legacy. Due to his powers, he went unnoticed by his teammates. Professor X had placed a psychic reminder for ForgetMeNot's existence once an hour. ForgetMeNot battles against the Brood and he is severely depressed by the death of Professor X in Avengers vs. X-Men, as he had lost his connection with others. He seeks Mimic and Omega to remove his powers, but their influences instead convinces him to retain his powers.

ForgetMeNot also joins X-Force briefly. During the Krakoan Age, he relocates to Krakoa and partners with Juggernaut during their stint in Nightcrawler's Legionaries. Forge had developed devices that would enable the X-Men and his teammates to remember ForgetMeNot. When Nimrod takes control of Krakoa using Warlock, the Legionaries have no choice but to kill Warlock. However, the Legionaries fail to do it because of Nimrod's defenses. Due to the nature of his powers, ForgetMeNot gets close enough to land the killing blow. The resulting explosion kills him and Warlock.

ForgetMeNot is resurrected and joins X-Factor during "From the Ashes".

== Power and abilities ==
ForgetMeNot has the mutant power of being forgotten (except to those who have either a psychic reminder or devices created by Forge). When ForgetMeNot is not within the view of an individual, his existence and any memories of him completely disappear from their mind. His power also interferes with individuals' aim and telemetry of mechanical devices.

== Reception ==
- In 2019, CBR ranked ForgetMeNot 7th in their "10 Best New X-Men of the Decade" list.
- In 2024, CBR ranked ForgetMeNot 10th in their "The 10 Most Powerful X-Men No One Talks About" list. and 2nd in "12 Weakest X-Men Members" list.
