= X-Force (comic book) =

Comic book series

- Cover for X-Force #1 (August 1991); Art by Rob Liefeld

Publication information
- Schedule: Monthly
- Format: List: (vol. 1, 3–6) Ongoing series (vol. 2) Limited series
- Genre: Superhero
- Publication date: List: (vol. 1) August 1991 – August 2002 (vol. 2) January 2004 – March 2005 (vol. 3) April 2008 – September 2010 (vol. 4) April 2014 – April 2015 (vol. 5) December 2018 – September 2019 (vol. 6) November 2019 – April 2024
- No. of issues: List: (vol. 1): 129 (vol. 2): 6 (vol. 3): 28 (vol. 4): 15 (vol. 5): 10 (vol. 6): 50

Creative team
- Written by: List: (vol. 1) Rob Liefeld Fabian Nicieza Jeph Loeb John Francis Moore Ian Edginton Peter Milligan (vol. 2) Fabian Nicieza (vol. 3) Craig Kyle Christopher Yost (vol. 4) Simon Spurrier
- Penciller: List: (vol. 1) Rob Liefeld Greg Capullo Tony Daniel Adam Pollina Jim Cheung Whilce Portacio Jorge Lucas Mike Allred (vol. 2) Rob Liefeld (vol. 3) Clayton Crain Mike Choi (vol. 4) Rock-He Kim Jorge Molina
- Inker: List: (vol. 1) Dan Panosian Harry Candelario Kevin Conrad Bud LaRosa Mark Morales Gerry Alanguilan
- Colorist: List: (vol. 1) Brad Vancata Mike Thomas Marie Javins Laura Allred (vol. 2) Matt Yackey (vol. 3) Sonia Oback José Villarrubia

X-Force is an ongoing comic book series featuring the fictional superhero team of the same name, published by Marvel Comics in various incarnations beginning in 1991.

== Publication history ==
=== X-Force Volume 1: 1991–2001 ===
==== Liefeld period ====
X-Force was created by illustrator Rob Liefeld after he started penciling The New Mutants comic book in 1989 with #86. The popularity of Liefeld's art led to him taking over the plotting duties on the book. With help from writer Fabian Nicieza, who provided the dialogue for Liefeld's plots, Liefeld transformed the New Mutants into X-Force in New Mutants #100, the book's final issue. Liefeld and Nicieza launched X-Force in August 1991. Rob Liefeld obtained the name for the series from an unknown artist at a convention a few months prior to its release. With the aid of a multiple-variant poly-bagged card, the book sold a record 5 million copies. The original line-up of the team included Boom-Boom, Cable, Cannonball, Domino, Feral, Shatterstar, and Warpath. Siryn was added to the team in the third issue.

The main opponents of X-Force during its first year were the terrorist Mutant Liberation Front, led by Stryfe, a masked mutant with a mysterious link to Cable. Early issues also featured the wise-cracking mercenary Deadpool, the immortal Externals, and a new version of the Brotherhood of Mutants.

Propelled by Liefeld's art, X-Force became one of Marvel's bestselling comic books immediately after its debut. The series rivaled The Amazing Spider-Man and Uncanny X-Men in popularity, particularly with the adolescent demographic. Toy Biz responded to X-Force's popularity by introducing an X-Force action figure line alongside its X-Men action figure line. Liefeld illustrated the series up to #9 and stopped plotting it after #11, as he had become increasingly frustrated with not owning characters he created and that his art was being used on a variety of merchandise while he allegedly received little royalties. Along with six other popular Marvel artists, Liefeld left Marvel Comics in 1992 to form Image Comics.

==== Nicieza period ====
X-Force continued with Nicieza taking over creative control of the series. Nicieza soon had the team break away from Cable and moved them to a new base in the ruins of Warpath's childhood home at the Camp Verde reservation; he also had former New Mutants Sunspot and Rictor join the team. The series crossed over with most other X-Men related books in the fall of 1992 with the X-Cutioner's Song storyline, co-plotted by Nicieza (who was also writing X-Men vol. 2). In that story, Stryfe frames Cable for an assassination attempt on the X-Men's founder Professor X, leading to a clash between the X-Men and X-Force. The crossover boosted Cable's popularity, despite the character's apparent death in X-Force #18, leading to his own solo series being launched in 1993.

After X-Cutioner's Song, X-Force continued under Nicieza with new artist Greg Capullo. With Cannonball taking over as leader, X-Force develop an identity of their own as an independent team. Cable would return in the Fatal Attractions crossover, with a less hardline leadership stance. Capullo departed from the series at this point, first succeeded by Matt Broome and then Tony Daniel. The team grew into a dysfunctional family, and the title regularly combined soap opera plot threads, such as romance and Siryn's alcoholism, with violent action. Nicieza fleshed out previously unknown elements of each character's history, including Siryn's family in Ireland, Rictor's in Mexico, Cannonball's in Kentucky, and Shatterstar's in Mojoworld. This period also saw reappearances of characters from the group's New Mutants days, such as Rusty and Skids, Danielle Moonstar, and Cypher and Wolfsbane. In issue #40 the team moved to a new underground base beneath Manhattan, formerly belonging to the supervillain Arcade. A long-simmering sub-plot about Reignfire and the disappearance of Sunspot came to a climax just as the book went on hiatus for the Age of Apocalypse crossover event in 1995, ending on a cliffhanger.

==== Loeb period ====
X-Force was radically overhauled in the wake of Age of Apocalypse from issue #44, with a new creative team of writer Jeph Loeb and illustrator Adam Pollina. The in-progress Reignfire story was apparently resolved off-panel between issues, and the team's Manhattan base was abruptly blown up in the X-Men Prime one-shot special. As part of a general editorial push to more closely integrate the various X-Men books, Loeb had the team move in with the X-Men at the X-Mansion and effectively become the X-Men's junior team, complete with introducing new uniforms modelled on the X-Men. Loeb's first issue also saw Cannonball and Rictor written out of the series, with Cannonball "graduating" to the X-Men and Rictor quitting; Caliban, a super-strong albino mutant who possessed the mind of a child, joined the team. Stories in this period generally toned down the series' levels of action and violence. The character Boomer (formerly Boom-Boom) also changed her codename to Meltdown and adopted a new aggressive attitude. Loeb's final story, the three-part Shatterstar Saga, brought Rictor back to the team; it also ambiguously retconned Shatterstar's origins in a manner that was generally regarded as unnecessarily confusing.

==== Moore period ====
In 1997, writer John Francis Moore took over the series and began revisiting plot developments that had been left ignored throughout Loeb's run, including Dani Moonstar infiltrating the MLF and the true perpetrator of the Camp Verde massacre. Following the Operation Zero Tolerance storyline, the team effectively disbanded in issue #70, and Cable, Caliban, Domino, Rictor and Shatterstar were written out of the series. The next year's worth of issues followed the remaining cast members Meltdown, Siryn, Sunspot, Warpath and Danielle Moonstar on a road trip across America. During this time James Proudstar was able to get closure on the massacre of his tribe, and subsequently stopped using the codename Warpath. The Reignfire story was also followed up on, with a new and more complete explanation for what had actually happened during Sunspot's disappearance. Former team members Cable, Cannonball, Domino, Rictor and Shatterstar all made one-off reappearances, as did New Mutants characters Karma and Skids.

In 1998, Moore and new artist Jim Cheung had X-Force move into new headquarters in San Francisco, returned Domino and Cannonball to the team, and added Bedlam, a mutant who could disrupt electronic equipment; they also gained a new ally in sorceress Jennifer Kale. A new major antagonist came to prominence in the Damocles Foundation, an organisation founded by rogue Deviants, Eternals and humans. Magma the former New Mutant also reappeared as an antagonist. Dani Moonstar acquired new superpowers, being able to manipulate quantum energies. Towards the end of the run, Siryn and Sunspot left the team and continued as recurring guests. The 1999 annual starred Rictor and Shatterstar, showing what they had been doing since leaving the team together.

Sales steadily declined throughout this period, falling from selling over 100,000 copies per issue to between forty and fifty thousand by the end of Moore's run with issue #100. A similar sales decline was observed in other ancillary X-Men titles, including Generation X and X-Man.

==== Counter-X ====
Writer Warren Ellis, known for his dark, cynical style, was put in charge of revamping X-Force along with Generation X and X-Man under the branding Counter-X, as part of the Revolution revamp of the various X-Men titles in 2000. Ellis' stint on X-Force over issues #102–115, co-written by Ian Edginton and illustrated by Whilce Portacio, saw Bedlam, Cannonball, Meltdown, and Warpath become a covert ops superhero team under the leadership of Pete Wisdom, a British mutant and former intelligence agent who could shoot burning blades of energy from his fingers. Despite the changes in creators, sales continued to decline at the same rate. The run concluded with Bedlam, Cannonball, Meltdown and Warpath all appearing to die in an explosion, although all were revealed to be alive soon after.

==== Milligan period ====
In early 2001, the X-Force title was completely reimagined by writer Peter Milligan and artist Mike Allred, who replaced the existing incarnation of the team with an entirely different group of mutants using the X-Force name. Issue #116 saw the introduction of a new, sardonically toned X-Force consisting of colorfully dressed and emotionally immature young mutants put together and marketed to be media superstars. X-Force was canceled with issue #129 in late 2002 and relaunched as X-Statix in late 2002.

=== X-Force Volume 2: 2004–2005 ===
In 2004, Marvel released a new six-issue X-Force limited series with the ongoing series' original creative team, with Rob Liefeld as artist and plotter and Fabian Nicieza as scripter. Some controversy arose from Liefeld's insertion of over ten pages from previous unpublished comic books (Weapon X and Cable: First Contact) with word balloons edited to make them fit the X-Force storyline. It was subsequently followed with a four-issue prequel X-Force: Shatterstar miniseries.

Cover of X-Force vol. 3, #1 (April 2008); art by Clayton Crain

=== X-Force Volume 3: 2008–2010 ===
A new X-Force ongoing series was launched in February 2008, written by Craig Kyle and Christopher Yost and drawn by Clayton Crain.

Cyclops forms a black ops incarnation of X-Force that uses lethal force to permanently deal with threats against mutants. Warpath, Wolfsbane, Wolverine, and X-23 form the starting lineup, with Angel, Domino, and Elixir joining soon after. Yost had at one point stated that Deadpool would join the cast to bring more diversity to the team, but this did not happen until after his run and the launch of Uncanny X-Force. This team does battle Red Hulk and his team, consisting of Deadpool, Punisher, Elektra, and Thundra, as they try to hunt down Domino.

=== X-Force Volume 4: 2014–2015 ===
As part of the "All-New Marvel NOW!" campaign, a new volume of X-Force was launched in February 2014, replacing Cable and X-Force and Uncanny X-Force vol. 2. It was written by X-Men: Legacy writer Simon Spurrier and illustrated by Rock-He Kim and Jorge Molina. It features a team of Cable, Psylocke, Fantomex, Doctor Nemesis, and Marrow. The title ended with 15 issues.

=== X-Force Volume 5: 2018–2019 ===
A new volume of X-Force was launched in December 2018. This volume was written by Ed Brisson and illustrated by Dylan Burnett. It features a team of young Cable, Warpath, Boom-Boom, Shatterstar, Deathlok, and Cannonball. It started with the legacy numbering of #231 (adding the issues of X-Force vol 1,2,3,4 and Uncanny X-Force Vol 1,2) This volume ended with issue #10 to allow for Jonathan Hickman's relaunch of all X-Men-related titles.

=== X-Force Volume 6: 2019–2024 ===
X-Force was relaunched in November 2019 as a part of Dawn of X, written by Benjamin Percy and illustrated by Joshua Cassara (pencils) and Dean White (colors). The initial team comprised Beast, Black Tom Cassidy, Domino, Jean Grey, Sage, and Wolverine, with Kid Omega and Colossus joining in issues #2 and #7 respectively.

=== X-Force Volume 7: 2024–2025 ===
X-Force was relaunched in July 2024 as part of X-Men: From the Ashes, written by Geoffrey Thorne and illustrated by Marcus To and Erick Arciniega. The lineup consisted of Forge, Sage, Captain Britain, Askani, Surge, and Tank.

=== Inglorious X-Force: 2026 ===
In October 2025, it was announced that a new series titled Inglorious X-Force would be launched in January 2026 as part of the "Shadows of Tomorrow" publishing line, written by Tim Seeley and illustrated by Michael Sta. Maria. The new team consists of Cable, Hellverine, Archangel, and Boom-Boom, with Ms. Marvel joining later.

=== Fugitive X-Force: 2026-2027 ===
In September 2026, it was announced that Inglorious X-Force would be followed up by Fugitive X-Force, a five-issue limited series which would debut in December of that year, with Seeley returning as writer and Áthila Fabbio on art. In this series, Boom-Boom replaces Cable as the team's new leader after he goes missing and the team is framed for a crime.

== Contributors ==
=== Writers ===
- Rob Liefeld: X-Force #1–12 & vol. 2 #1–6 (August 1991–July 1992 & October 2004–March 2005)
- Fabian Nicieza: X-Force #1–43 & Annual #1–3 & vol. 2 #1–6 (August 1991–February 1995 & October 2004–March 2005)
- Jeph Loeb: X-Force #44–61 (July 1995–December 1996)
- John Dokes: X-Force #62 (January 1997)
- John Francis Moore: X-Force #63–76 & #78–100 (February 1997–April 1998 & June 1998–March 2000)
- Joseph Harris: X-Force #77 & #101 (May 1998 & April 2000)
- Warren Ellis & Ian Edginton: X-Force #102–105 (May–August 2000)
- Ian Edginton: X-Force #102–115 (May 2000–June 2001)
- Peter Milligan: X-Force #116–129 (July 2001–August 2002)
- Craig Kyle & Christopher Yost: X-Force vol. 3 #1–#28 (February 2008–September 2010)
- Si Spurrier: X-Force vol. 4 #1–15 (February 2014–February 2015)
- Ed Brisson: X-Force vol. 5 #1–10 (December 2018–September 2019)
- Benjamin Percy: X-Force vol. 6 #1–50 (November 2019–March 2024)
- Gerry Duggan: X-Force vol. 6 #14 (November 2020)
- Geoffrey Thorne: X-Force vol. 7 #1–10 (July 2024–April 2025)
- Tim Seeley: Inglorious X-Force #1–10 (January 2026–October 2026)
- Tim Seeley: Fugitive X-Force #1–present (December 2026–present) (announced)

=== Artists ===
- Rob Liefeld: X-Force #1–7 & #9 & vol. 2 #1–6 (August 1991–June 1992 & October 2004–March 2005)
- Mike Mignola: X-Force #8 (March 1992)
- Mark Pacella: X-Force #10–13 (May–August 1992)
- Terry Shoemaker: X-Force #14 (September 1992)
- Greg Capullo: X-Force #15–25 (October 1992–August 1993)
- Matt Broome: X-Force #26–27 & #29
- Tony Daniel: X-Force #28, #30–36, #38–41 & #43
- Paul Pelletier: X-Force #37
- Adam Pollina: X-Force #44–81
- Jim Cheung: X-Force #82–84, #86–88, #90, #94–95 & #98–100
- Whilce Portacio: X-Force #102–106 (May–September 2000)
- Mike Allred: X-Force #116–123 & #125–128 (July 2001–August 2002)
- Darwyn Cooke: X-Force #124
- Duncan Fegredo: X-Force #129
- Clayton Crain: X-Force vol. 3 #1–6, #11–16 & #21–25 (February–August 2008, January–June 2009 & November 2009–March 2010)
- Mike Choi: X-Force vol. 3 #7–10, #17–20 & #26–28 (September–December 2008, July–October 2009 & April–June 2010)
- Alina Urusov: X-Force vol. 3 #11 (January 2009)
- Rock-He Kim: X-Force vol. 4 #1–3, #7–9, #11–12, #14–15 (February 2014–February 2015)
- Jorge Molina: X-Force vol. 4 #4–6 (April–June 2014)
- Tan Eng Huat: X-Force vol. 4 #10 (October 2014), #13 (December 2014)
- Dylan Burnett: X-Force vol. 5 #1–4, #8–10 (December 2018–March 2019, May–July 2019)
- Damian Couceiro: X-Force vol. 5 #5-7 (March–May 2019)
- Joshua Cassara: X-Force vol. 6 #1–5, #9–10, #14–18, #20-21 (November 2019–January 2020, March–July 2020, November 2020–March 2021, June 2021-July 2021)
- Stephen Segovia: X-Force vol. 6 #6 (January 2020)
- Jan Bazaldua: X-Force vol. 6 #7–8, #11–12 (February 2020, August–September 2020)
- Viktor Bogdanovic: X-Force vol. 6 #13 (October 2020)
- Garry Brown: X-Force vol. 6 #18-19, (March 2021-April 2021)
- Robert Gill: X-Force vol. 6 #21-22, #25-33, #36-40, #43-43, #48-50 (July 2021-August 2021, November 2021-October 2022, January 2023-May 2023, August 2023-November 2023, January 2024-March 2024)
- Martin Coccolo: X-Force vol. 6 #23-24 (September 2021-October 2021)
- Chris Allen: X-Force vol. 6 #34-35 (November 2022-December 2022)
- Paul Davidson: X-Force vol. 6 #40-42 (May 2023-July 2023)
- Daniel Picciotto: X-Force vol. 6 #47 (December 2023)
- Marcus To: X-Force vol. 7 #1-10 (July 2024-April 2025)
- Michael Sta. Maria: Inglorious X-Force #1-3, 5-7, 9-10 (January 2026-March 2026, May 2026-July 2026, September 2026-October 2026)
- Philip Tan: Inglorious X-Force #4 (April 2026)
- Roi Mercado: Inglorious X-Force #5 (May 2026)
- Luca Maresca: Inglorious X-Force #8 (August 2026)
- Áthila Fabbio: Fugitive X-Force #1–present (December 2026–present) (announced)

=== Cover art ===
- Rob Liefeld: X-Force #1–9 & #11 and #50 & #100 variants (August 1991 – January 1996)
- Greg Capullo: X-Force #15–27 (October 1992 – October 1993)
- Whilce Portacio: X-Force #102–109 (May 2000 – December 2000)
- Mike Allred: X-Force #116–128 (July 2001 – August 2002)
- Clayton Crain: X-Force, vol. 3 #1–6, #11–13, #14–16 (variants) & #21–25
- Bryan Hitch: X-Force, vol. 3 #1 (variant)
- Mike Choi: X-Force, vol. 3 #7–10 & #17–20 (November 2008 – February 2009 & September–December 2009)
- Kaare Andrews: X-Force, vol. 3 #14–16
- Adi Granov: X-Force, vol. 3 #26–28
- David Finch: X-Force, vol. 3 #26–28 (variants)
- Pepe Larraz: X-Force, vol. 5 #1–7 (December 2018 – May 2019)
- Giuseppe Camuncoli: X-Force, vol. 5 #8 (May 2019)
- Valerio Schiti: X-Force, vol. 5 #9-10 (June 2019 – July 2019)
- Dustin Weaver: X-Force, vol. 6 #1–14 (November 2019 – November 2020)
- Joshua Cassara: X-Force, vol. 6 #15-42 (December 2020 – July 2023)
- Daniel Acuña: X-Force, vol. 6 #43-50 (August 2023 – March 2024)
- Stephen Segovia: X-Force, vol. 7 #1-10 (July 2024 – April 2025)
- R.B. Silva: Inglorious X-Force #1-10 (January 2026 – October 2026)
- Eric Canete: Fugitive X-Force #1-present (December 2026 – present)

== Cast ==
=== Volume 1 ===
Issues	Characters
#1–2	Boom-Boom, Cable, Cannonball, Copycat (as Domino), Feral, Shatterstar, Warpath
#3–14	Boom-Boom, Cable, Cannonball, Copycat (as Domino), Feral, Shatterstar, Siryn, Sunspot, Warpath
#15–24	Boom-Boom, Cannonball, Feral, Rictor, Shatterstar, Siryn, Sunspot, Warpath
#25–28	Boom-Boom, Cable, Cannonball, Feral, Rictor, Shatterstar, Siryn, Sunspot, Warpath
#29–38	Boom-Boom, Cable, Cannonball, Domino, Rictor, Shatterstar, Siryn, Warpath
#39	Boom-Boom, Cable, Cannonball, Domino, Prosh, Rictor, Shatterstar, Siryn, Warpath
#40–43	Boom-Boom, Cable, Cannonball, Domino, Rictor, Shatterstar, Siryn, Warpath
#44–50	Boom-Boom, Cable, Caliban, Domino, Shatterstar, Siryn, Sunspot, Warpath
#51–69	Cable, Caliban, Domino, Meltdown (formerly Boom-Boom), Rictor, Shatterstar, Siryn, Sunspot, Warpath
#70–81	Meltdown, Moonstar, Siryn, Sunspot, Warpath
#83–86	Bedlam, Cannonball, Meltdown, Moonstar, Siryn, Sunspot, Warpath
#87–91	Bedlam, Cannonball, Domino, Meltdown, Moonstar, Siryn, Sunspot, Warpath
#92–101	Bedlam, Cannonball, Domino, Meltdown, Moonstar, Warpath
#102–106	Bedlam, Cannonball, Meltdown, Warpath, Wisdom
#107–115	Bedlam, Cannonball, Domino, Meltdown, Warpath
#116	Anarchist, Battering Ram, Doop, Gin Genie, Plazm, U-Go Girl, Zeitgeist
#117–118	Anarchist, Bloke, Doop, Orphan, Phat, Saint Anna, U-Go Girl, Vivisector
#119	Anarchist, Doop, Orphan, Phat, Saint Anna, U-Go Girl, Vivisector
#120	Anarchist, Doop, Orphan, Phat, U-Go Girl, Vivisector
#121–124	Anarchist, Doop, Orphan, Phat, Spike, U-Go Girl, Vivisector
#125–128	Anarchist, Dead Girl, Doop, Orphan, Phat, Spike, U-Go Girl, Vivisector
#129	Anarchist, Dead Girl, Doop, Orphan, Phat, Vivisector

=== Volume 2 ===
Issues	Characters
#1–3	Cable, Cannonball, Domino, Human Torch, Meltdown, Shatterstar, Sunspot, the Thing, Warpath, Wolverine
#4–5	Cable, Caliban, Meltdown, Shatterstar
#6	Cable, Caliban, Domino, Human Torch, Meltdown, Shatterstar, the Thing, Wolverine

=== Volume 3 ===
Issues	Year	Characters
Messiah Complex	2008	Caliban, Hepzibah, Warpath, Wolfsbane, Wolverine, X-23
#1–7	2008	Warpath, Wolfsbane, Wolverine, X-23
#8–10	2008–2009	Archangel, Elixir, Warpath, Wolfsbane, Wolverine, X-23
#11–25	2009–2010	Archangel, Domino, Elixir, Vanisher, Warpath, Wolfsbane, Wolverine, X-23
#26	2010	Archangel, Domino, Vanisher, Wolverine
#27–28	2010	Archangel, Cable, Cypher, Domino, Wolverine, X-23
Second Coming #2	2010	Team disassembling – Archangel, Domino, Wolverine, X-23. Team reformation as Uncanny X-Force – Archangel, Deadpool, E.V.A, Fantomex, Psylocke, Wolverine

=== Volume 4 ===
Issues	Year	Characters
#1–11	2014	Cable, Doctor Nemesis, E.V.A., Fantomex, Hope Summers (as MeMe), Marrow, Psylocke
#12–13	2014	Cable, Domino, Doctor Nemesis, Hope Summers (as MeMe), Marrow, Psylocke
#14–15	2015	Cable, Domino, Doctor Nemesis, ForgetMeNot, Hope Summers, Marrow, Psylocke

=== Volume 5 ===
Issues	Year	Characters
#1–10	2018–2019	Domino, Cannonball, Shatterstar, Boom-Boom, Warpath, Deathlok, Kid Cable

=== Volume 6 ===
Issues	Year	Cast
#1	2019	Beast; Black Tom Cassidy; Domino; Jean Grey; Sage; Wolverine
#2–6	2019–2020	Beast; Black Tom Cassidy; Domino; Jean Grey; Kid Omega; Sage; Wolverine
#7–8	2020	Colossus; Domino; Sage
#9–10	2020	Beast; Black Tom Cassidy; Domino; Jean Grey; Kid Omega; Sage; Wolverine
#11–12	2020	Beast; Black Tom Cassidy; Colossus; Domino; Kid Omega; Sage; Wolverine
#13–14	2020	X of Swords crossover
#15	2020	Beast; Black Tom Cassidy; Colossus; Domino; Forge; Marvel Girl; Sage; Wolverine
#16	2021	Beast; Black Tom Cassidy; Cecilia Reyes; Domino; Forge; Kid Omega; Phoebe Cuckoo; Wolverine
#17	2021	Kid Omega; Phoebe Cuckoo
#18	2021	Beast; Black Tom Cassidy; Jean Grey; Kid Omega; Phoebe Cuckoo; Sage; Wolverine
#19	2021	Black Tom Cassidy; Domino; Jean Grey; Kid Omega; Phoebe Cuckoo; Sage
#20	2021	Beast; Domino; Kid Omega; Sage; Wolverine
#21	2021	Beast; Domino; Forge; Kid Omega; Sage; Wolverine
#22	2021	Beast; Domino; Sage; Wolverine
#23	2021	Beast; Black Tom Cassidy; Sage
#24	2021	Beast; Black Tom Cassidy; Colossus
#25	2021	Forge; Kid Omega; Phoebe Cuckoo; Wolverine
#26	2021	Black Tom Cassidy; Domino; Jean Grey; Kid Omega; Sage; Wolverine
#27	2022	Beast; Domino; Forge; Kid Omega; Sage; Wolverine
#28	2022	Beast; Domino; Kid Omega; Sage; Wolverine
#29	2022	Domino; Kid Omega; Sage; Wolverine
#30	2022	Beast; Black Tom Cassidy; Deadpool; Domino; Omega Red; Sage; Wolverine
#31	2022	Beast; Black Tom Cassidy; Deadpool; Omega Red; Sage
#32	2022	Beast; Black Tom Cassidy; Deadpool; Omega Red; Sage; Wolverine
#33	2022	Beast; Deadpool; Omega Red; Sage; Wolverine
#34	2022	Beast; Black Tom Cassidy; Deadpool; Domino; Omega Red; Sage
#35	2022	Beast; Black Tom Cassidy; Domino; Omega Red; Sage; Wolverine
#36	2023	Beast; Black Tom Cassidy; Deadpool; Domino; Omega Red; Sage
#37-38	2023	Beast; Deadpool; Domino; Omega Red; Sage
#39	2023	Black Tom Cassidy; Deadpool; Domino; Kid Omega; Omega Red; Sage; Wolverine (Laura Kinney); Wolverine (Logan)
#40	2023	Colossus; Deadpool; Domino; Kid Omega; Omega Red; Sage; Wolverine (Laura Kinney)
#41	2023	Colossus; Domino; Kid Omega; Omega Red; Sage; Wolverine (Laura Kinney)
#42	2023	Colossus; Domino; Kid Omega; Sage; Wolverine (Laura Kinney)
#43	2023	Black Tom Cassidy; Colossus; Deadpool; Domino; Kid Omega; Omega Red; Sage; Wolverine (Laura Kinney)
#44	2023	Black Tom Cassidy; Colossus; Domino; Kid Omega; Omega Red; Sage; Wolverine (Laura Kinney)
#45-46	2023	Colossus; Domino; Kid Omega; Omega Red; Sage; Wolverine (Laura Kinney)
#47	2023	Black Tom Cassidy; Colossus; Domino; Kid Omega; Omega Red; Sage; Wolverine (Laura Kinney); Wolverine (Logan)
#48-50	2024	Beast; Black Tom Cassidy; Colossus; Domino; Kid Omega; Omega Red; Sage; Wolverine (Laura Kinney); Wolverine (Logan)

=== Volume 7 ===
Issues	Year	Cast
#1-5	2024	Askani; Captain Britain; Forge; Sage; Surge; Tank
#6	2024	Askani; Captain Britain; Forge; Sage; Tank
#7	2025	Askani; Captain Britain; Forge; Tank
#8-9	2025	Askani; Captain Britain; Forge; Sage; Tank
#10	2025	Askani; Captain Britain; Forge; Sage; Surge; Tank

=== Inglorious X-Force ===
Issues	Year	Cast
#1-7	2026	Archangel; Boom-Boom; Cable; Hellverine; Ms. Marvel
#8-9	2026	Cable's Team: Archangel; Boom-Boom; Cable; Hellverine; Ms. Marvel; Domino's Team: Domino; Pug-Smasher; Rictor; Shatterstar; Warpath

== Prints ==
=== Volume 6 ===
Issue	Publication date	Writer	Artist	Colorist	Comic Book Roundup rating	Estimated sales to North American retailers (first month)	Notes
#1	November 6, 2019	Benjamin Percy	Joshua Cassara	Dean White	8.1 by 23 professional critics	105,138	None
#2	November 27, 2019	Benjamin Percy	Joshua Cassara	Dean White	8.2 by 15 professional critics	53,667	None
#3	December 11, 2019	Benjamin Percy	Joshua Cassara	Dean White	8.2 by 11 professional critics	47,178	None
#4	December 18, 2019	Benjamin Percy	Joshua Cassara	Dean White	8.4 by 8 professional critics	44,872	None
#5	January 8, 2020	Benjamin Percy	Joshua Cassara	Dean White	8.6 by 11 professional critics	53,157	None
#6	January 29, 2020	Benjamin Percy	Stephen Segovia	Guru e-FX	8.2 by 13 professional critics	47,131	None
#7	February 12, 2020	Benjamin Percy	Oscar Bazaldua	Guru e-FX	8.1 by 10 professional critics	42,808	None
#8	February 26, 2020	Benjamin Percy	Oscar Bazaldua	Guru e-FX	7.9 by 10 professional critics	41,153	None
#9	March 11, 2020	Benjamin Percy	Joshua Cassara	Dean White	8.9 by 8 professional critics	43,075	None
#10	July 8, 2020	Benjamin Percy	Joshua Cassara	Guru e-FX	8.2 by 12 professional critics	Data not yet available	None
#11	August 12, 2020	Benjamin Percy	Oscar Bazaldua	Guru e-FX	8.0 by 9 professional critics	Data not yet available	None
#12	September 9, 2020	Benjamin Percy	Oscar Bazaldua	Guru e-FX	8.4 by 7 professional critics	29,500–35,000	None
#13	October 7, 2020	Benjamin Percy	Viktor Bogdanovic	Matt Wilson	7.7 by 11 professional critics	48,000–53,000	X of Swords tie-in
#14	November 18, 2020	Benjamin Percy; Gerry Duggan	Joshua Cassara	Guru e-FX	7.5 by 11 professional critics	Data not yet available	X of Swords tie-in
#15	December 16, 2020	Benjamin Percy	Joshua Cassara	Guru e-FX	8.4 by 7 professional critics	Data not yet available	None
#16	January 20, 2021	Benjamin Percy	Joshua Cassara	Guru e-FX	8.3 by 9 professional critics	Data not yet available	None
#17	February 10, 2021	Benjamin Percy	Joshua Cassara	Guru e-FX	8.2 by 10 professional critics	Data not yet available	None
#18	March 17, 2021	Benjamin Percy	Garry Brown	Guru e-FX	7.2 by 9 professional critics	Data not yet available	None

== Collected editions ==
=== Volume 1 Epic Collections ===
Title	Material collected	Publication Date	ISBN
X-Force Epic Collection Vol 1: Under The Gun	X-Force #1-15, Annual #1; Spider-Man (1990) #16; Wolverine (1988) #54		
X-Force Epic Collection Vol 2: X-Cutioner's Song	X-Force #16-19, Cable: Blood & Metal #1-2, Uncanny X-Men #294-296, X-Factor #84-86, X-Men (vol. 2) #14-16, Stryfe's Strike File #1, New Warriors #31	December 2019	978-1302920661
X-Force Epic Collection Vol 3: Assault on Greymalkin	X-Force #20-26, Cable vol.1 #1-4, Deadpool: The Circle Chase #1-4, X-Force Annual #2	December 2023	
X-Force Epic Collection Vol 4: Toy Soldiers	X-Force #27-39, Annual #3; Cable #6-8; New Warriors #45-46	February 2025	
X-Force Epic Collection Vol 7: Zero Tolerance	X-Force #66-84, #-1	March 2022	978-1302927110
X-Force Epic Collection Vol 8: Armageddon Now	X-Force #85-100, X-Force/Champions Annual ’98, X-Force Annual ’99	June 2023	

=== Other Trade Paperbacks ===
Title	Material collected	Publication Date	ISBN
X-Men: Fatal Attractions	X-Force #25; X-Factor #92; Uncanny X-Men #304; X-Men (vol. 2) #25; Wolverine (vol. 2)#75; Excalibur #71	August 2000	0-7851-0748-7
Origin of Generation X: Tales of the Phalanx Covenant	X-Force #38; Uncanny X-Men #316–317; X-Men (vol. 2) #36–37; X-Factor #106; Excalibur #82; Wolverine (vol. 2) #85; Cable #16; Generation X #1	June 2001	0-7851-0216-7
Cable and X-Force Classic Vol. 1	X-Force #44–48;Cable (vol. 1) #21–28	April 2013	978-0-7851-6272-8
Cable and X-Force: Onslaught Rising	X-Force #49-56; Cable (vol.1) #29-31; X-Man #14, X-Force/Cable Annual '95	February 2018	978-1-302-90949-9
Cable and X-Force: Onslaught!	X-Force #57-61; Cable (vol. 1) #32-39; Incredible Hulk (Vol. 1) #444; X-Man #18-19; X-Force/Cable Annual '96	March 2019	978-1302916190
X-Men: The Complete Onslaught Epic Vol. 2	X-Force #57; Excalibur #100; Fantastic Four #415; Amazing Spider-Man #415; Sensational Spider-Man #8; Spider-Man #72; Green Goblin #12; Punisher #11; X-Factor #125–126; Wolverine (vol. 2) #104; X-Man #17; X-Men (vol. 2) #55; Uncanny X-Men #336	June 2008	0-7851-2824-7
X-Men: The Complete Onslaught Epic Vol. 3	X-Force #58; Avengers #402; Incredible Hulk #445; Iron Man #332; Thor #502; Wolverine (vol. 2) #104; Cable #35; X-Men (vol. 2) #55; Uncanny X-Men #336; X-Man #19	August 2008	0-7851-2825-5
X-Men: Powerless	X-Force #101; Uncanny X-Men #379–380; Cable vol.1 #78; Wolverine, vol. 2 #149; and X-Men, vol. 2 #99	August 2010	0-7851-4677-6
Counter-X: X-Force	X-Force #102–109	July 2008	0-7851-3304-6
Counter X: X-Force: Rage War	X-Force #110–115, 102 Rough Cut	August 2012	978-0785159735
X-Force: Famous, Mutant & Mortal, Volume 1: New Beginning	X-Force #116–120	November 2001	0-7851-0819-X
X-Force: Famous, Mutant & Mortal, Volume 2: Final Chapter	X-Force #121–129	November 2002	0-7851-1088-7

=== Volume 1 Premiere Hardcovers ===
Title	Material collected	Publication Date	ISBN
X-Force: A Force To Be Reckoned With HC	New Mutants #98–100; X-Force #1–4; and Spider-Man #16	January 2011	0-7851-4984-8
X-Force: Under The Gun HC	X-Force #5–15, material from Annual #1	March 2011	0-7851-4985-6
X-Force: Assault on Graymalkin HC	X-Force #19–25, New Warriors #31	November 2011	0-7851-5899-5
X-Force: Toy Soldiers HC	X-Force #26–31, Annual #2; Nomad #20	April 2012	0-7851-6219-4
X-Force: Child's Play HC	X-Force #32–37, Annual #3; New Warriors #45–46	August 2012	0-7851-6269-0
X-Force: The Phalanx Covenant HC	X-Force #38–43; X-Factor #106; Excalibur #82	May 2013	978-0-7851-6272-8

=== Volume 1 Oversized Hardcovers ===
Title	Material collected	Publication Date	ISBN
X-Force Omnibus – Vol. 1	New Mutants #98–100, Annual #7; X-Men Annual #15; X-Factor Annual #6; X-Force #1–15; Spider-Man #16; Cable: Blood & Metal #1–2; material from New Warriors Annual #1, X-Force Annual #1	February 2013	0785165959
X-Men: X-Cutioner's Song	X-Force #16–18; Uncanny X-Men #294–296; X-Factor #84–86; and X-Men (vol. 2) #14–16	May 1994	0-7851-0025-3
Deadpool and X-Force Omnibus	X-Force #19-31, Annual #2; Cable (vol. 1) #1–8; Deadpool: The Circle Chase #1-4; Deadpool (vol. 1) #1-4; New Warriors (vol. 1) #31; Nomad #20	November 2017	978-1302908300
Cable and X-Force Omnibus	X-Force #32-43, Annual #3; Cable #9-20; New Warriors #45-46; X-Factor #106; Excalibur #82, Wolverine #85	July 2019	
X-Men/Avengers: Onslaught	Cable #32-36; X-Force #55, 57-58; Uncanny X-Men #333-337; X-Man #15-19; X-Men #53-57; X-Men Annual '96; X-Men Unlimited #11; Onslaught: X-Men; Onslaught: Marvel Universe; Onslaught: Epilogue; Avengers #401-402; Fantastic Four #415; Incredible Hulk #444-445; Wolverine #104-105; X-Factor #125-126; Amazing Spider-Man #415; Green Goblin #12; Spider-Man #72; Iron Man #332; Punisher #11; Thor #502; X-Men: Road to Onslaught #1; material from Excalibur #100, Fantastic Four #416	March 2022	
X-Men: Operation Zero Tolerance	X-Force #67–70, Generation X #26–31, X-Men #65–70, Uncanny X-Men #346, Wolverine #115–118, Cable #45–47, X-Man #30	August 2012	0-7851-6240-2
X-Men vs. Apocalypse: The Twelve Omnibus	Uncanny X-Men #371-380 and Annual '99; X-Men (vol. 2) #91-99 and Annual '99 (#94, A-story only); X-Men Unlimited #24-26 (#24, A-story only); Astonishing X-Men (vol. 2) #1-3; Wolverine (vol. 2) #145–149; Gambit #8-9; Cable #71-78; X-Man #59-60; X-51 #8; X-Force #101; X-Men Yearbook 1999	February 2020	
X-Force: Famous, Mutant & Mortal	X-Force #116–129	July 2003	0-7851-1023-2
X-Statix Omnibus	X-Force #116–129; Brotherhood #9; X-Statix #1-26; Wolverine/Doop #1-2; X-Statix Presents: Dead Girl #1-5; and material from X-Men Unlimited #41, I [HEART] Marvel: My Mutant Heart and Nation X #4.	December 2011	

=== Volume 2 ===
Title	Material collected	Publication Date	ISBN
X-Force and Cable: Legend Returns	X-Force (vol. 2) #1–6	April 2005	0-7851-1429-7
X-Force: Shatterstar	X-Force: Shatterstar #1–4, New Mutants #99–100	August 2005	0-7851-1633-8

=== Volume 3 ===
Title	Material collected	Publication Date	ISBN
X-Force Volume 1: Angels and Demons	X-Force (vol. 3) #1–6	November 2008	0-7851-3552-9
X-Force Volume 2: Old Ghosts	X-Force (vol. 3) #7–11	June 2009	0-7851-3821-8
X-Force Volume 3: Not Forgotten	X-Force (vol. 3) #12–13, 17–20	December 2009	0-7851-4019-0
X-Force/Cable: Messiah War	X-Force (vol. 3) #14–16; X-Men: The Times and Life of Lucas Bishop #1–3; Cable (vol. 2) #11–15; Messiah War; and X-Men: Future History—The Messiah War Sourcebook	August 2009	0-7851-3157-4
X-Necrosha	X-Force (vol. 3) #11, 21–25, material from Annual #1; New X-Men (vol. 2) #32; New Mutants (vol. 3) #6–8; X-Men: Legacy #231–234; X-Force/New Mutants: Necrosha; and X-Necrosha: The Gathering	July 2010	0-7851-4674-1
X-Men: Second Coming	X-Force (vol. 3) #26–28; Second Coming: Prepare; X-Men: Second Coming #1–2; Uncanny X-Men #523–525; New Mutants (vol. 3) #12–14; and X-Men: Legacy #235–237	September 2010	0-7851-4678-4
X-Force: Sex and Violence	X-Force: Sex & Violence #1–3	December 2010	978-0785149972
X-Force by Craig Kyle & Chris Yost: The Complete Collection Volume 1	X-Force (vol. 3) #1–13; X-Force Special: Ain't No Dog #1, material from X-Force Annual #1	March 2014	0-7851-8966-1
X-Force by Craig Kyle & Chris Yost: The Complete Collection Volume 2	X-Force (vol. 3) #17–25; X-Necrosha: The Gathering; X-Force: Sex & Violence #1–3; material from X-Necrosha and X-Force Annual #1	September 2014	0-7851-9000-7

=== Volume 4 ===
Title	Material collected	Publication Date	ISBN
X-Force Volume 1: Dirty/Tricks	X-Force (vol. 4) #1–6	September 9, 2014	978-0785190264
X-Force Volume 2: Hide/Fear	X-Force (vol. 4) #7–10; X-Men: Legacy (vol. 1) #300	February 3, 2015	978-0785190271
X-Force Volume 3: Ends/Means	X-Force (vol. 4) #11–15	May 12, 2015	978-0785193913

=== Volume 5 ===
Title	Material collected	Publication Date	ISBN
X-Force Volume 1: Sins of the Past	X-Force (vol. 5) #1–5	June 11, 2019	978-1302915735
X-Force Volume 2: The Counterfeit King	X-Force (vol. 5) #6–10	September 17, 2019	978-1302915742

=== Volume 6 ===
Title	Material collected	Publication date	ISBN
X-Force by Benjamin Percy Vol. 1	X-Force (vol. 6) #1–6	June 2, 2020	978-1302919887
X-Force by Benjamin Percy Vol. 2	X-Force (vol. 6) #7–12	December 8, 2020	978-1302919894
X-Force by Benjamin Percy Vol. 3	X-Force (vol. 6) #15-20, Wolverine (vol. 7) #13	October 5, 2021	978-1302927219
X-Force by Benjamin Percy Vol. 4	X-Force (vol. 6) #21-26	February 22, 2022	978-1302927226
X-Force by Benjamin Percy Vol. 5	X-Force (vol. 6) #27-33	December 20, 2022	978-1302932664
X-Force by Benjamin Percy Vol. 6	X-Force (vol. 6) #34-38	June 6, 2023	978-1302947675
X-Force by Benjamin Percy Vol. 7	X-Force (vol. 6) #39-42	October 10, 2023	978-1302947682
X-Force by Benjamin Percy Vol. 8	X-Force (vol. 6) #43-46	May 21, 2024	978-1302951542
X-Force By Benjamin Percy Vol. 1 (HC)	X-Force (vol. 6) #1–12	June 7, 2022	978-1302945077
X-Force By Benjamin Percy Vol. 2 (HC)	X-Force (vol. 6) #15-26, Wolverine (vol. 7) #13	May 30, 2023	978-1302950026
