= X-Cutioner's Song =

Marvel Comics storyline

- Cover of X-Cutioner's Song (1994), trade paperback collected edition, art by Jae Lee
- Publisher: Marvel Comics
- Publication date: November 1992 – February 1993
- Genre: Superhero; Crossover
Title(s)
Stryfe's Strike File #1
The Uncanny X-Men #294-297
X-Factor vol. 1, #84-86
X-Men vol. 2, #14-16
X-Force vol. 1, #16-19
Cable - Blood and Metal #1-2
What If? #69
- Main character(s): X-Men; X-Force; X-Factor; Mutant Liberation Front; Apocalypse; Mister Sinister; Stryfe

Creative team
- Writer(s): Scott Lobdell, Fabian Nicieza, Peter David
- Penciller(s): Brandon Peterson, Andy Kubert, Jae Lee, Greg Capullo
- Inker(s): Terry Austin, Mark Pennington, Al Milgrom, Harry Candelario
- Colorist(s): Mike Thomas, Marie Javins, Glynis Oliver, Joe Rosas, Steve Buccellato
- X-cutioners Song: ISBN 0-7851-0025-3

"X-Cutioner's Song" is a crossover storyline published by Marvel Comics' in twelve parts from November 1992 to early 1993. It ran in Uncanny X-Men, X-Men (vol. 2), X-Factor, and X-Force, and featured Stryfe as the central villain.

The main issues of the crossover were sold polybagged with a special trading card that featured Stryfe's personal views of key characters from the crossover. Because of this, the issues were priced at $1.50, twenty-five cents more than their normal price of $1.25.

== Plot ==
Mutant pop-star Lila Cheney organizes a free concert in Central Park to promote diversity in society and invites Professor Charles Xavier to speak at the concert. His speech is interrupted by Stryfe who, disguised as his doppelganger and nemesis Cable, shoots Xavier with a bullet that infects the professor with a lethal strain of the techno-organic virus.

Meanwhile, War and Famine, the Horsemen of Apocalypse, attack Iceman and Colossus, distracting them from Caliban, who kidnaps Cyclops and Jean Grey. The Horsemen are working for Mister Sinister, who is impersonating the Horsemen's former master Apocalypse. Sinister organized the kidnapping as part of his newly formed alliance with Stryfe. Stryfe trades Mr. Sinister a canister containing the past and future Summers family DNA history, and receives Jean Grey and Cyclops in the exchange.

While Xavier is rushed to the hospital, X-Factor and the Blue X-Men strike team go after X-Force, Cable's team of mutants. X-Force, however, is in the dark about Cable's current location, having been separated from him during a S.H.I.E.L.D.-organized raid of their headquarters. But mutual distrust causes the two groups to attack and ultimately capture X-Force. Meanwhile, Mr. Sinister doublecrosses Stryfe by revealing to the X-Men that Stryfe, under the guise of Cable, was the shooter.

While the Blue X-Men strike team, X-Factor, Boom-Boom and Cannonball go after the Mutant Liberation Front, Storm's Gold X-Men strike team, along with Quicksilver, confront Apocalypse over Scott and Jean's kidnapping, hoping as well to gain a cure for the virus that is threatening Xavier's life. Apocalypse is incredibly weak, having been nearly killed by Cyclops in their previous encounter and prematurely awoken from his regeneration chamber by his minions the Dark Riders. After learning from the Dark Riders that someone had been impersonating him, and ordered his old minions to kidnap Jean and Scott, Apocalypse barely escapes with his life. Archangel finds himself becoming more and more consumed with punishing Apocalypse for his crimes, most notably Apocalypse's converting Archangel into Death.

The Mutant Liberation Front is defeated, though at the cost of Rogue being blinded by MLF member Strobe. Meanwhile, Bishop and Wolverine locate Cable and after a brawl, decide to give him the benefit of the doubt and work together to find Jean and Scott.

Apocalypse is ambushed by Stryfe, who declares that he is out for revenge for unknown wrongs committed against him as a child by Apocalypse. After Stryfe stabs him in the chest, Apocalypse escapes and seeks refuge amongst the X-Men, ultimately curing Xavier of the techno-organic virus as payment for sanctuary.

Cyclops and Jean are systematically tortured by Stryfe, who blames the two mutants for ruining his life, a claim that leaves the two X-Men stunned since they never encountered Stryfe before their kidnapping. Stryfe and his new minions the Dark Riders, who pledge their allegiance to Stryfe after he defeats Apocalypse, move the two to Apocalypse's former base on the Moon. Scott and Jean escape, entering the vacuum before realizing they are not on Earth. Her powers no longer blocked, Jean sends a frantic SOS to Wolverine.

The X-Men, knowing Xavier will live now that Apocalypse has purged the techno-virus from him, head into space to save their teammates. Cable, Wolverine, and Bishop head out to Stryfe's base on the Moon too and arrive there first, decimating Stryfe's defenses just as the X-Men (Storm, Psylocke, Polaris, Cannonball, Havok, Iceman, and Archangel) and Apocalypse arrive. Splitting up, Apocalypse is ambushed by the Dark Riders, who beat their former master to the brink of death. Apocalypse is later confronted by Archangel who refuses Apocalypse's request for a mercy killing.

Upon catching Jean and Scott Summers outside the moonbase, Stryfe takes them to a giant time portal he had constructed on the Moon. As Cable, Cannonball, Havok, and Polaris make their way to the tower, a forcefield is activated that prevents any without the Summers DNA from approaching the tower just as Stryfe activated the tower's time portal technology. Stryfe planned this so he could confront Cable alone, and though Havok has enough genetic similarity to Scott to pass through the forcefield, doing so renders him unconscious. Cable finds himself hopelessly outmatched by Stryfe, but as they battle, Jean Grey and Cyclops break free and Havok regains consciousness. Driven to despair, Stryfe tries to collapse the active tower upon the X-Men. Cable grabs Stryfe and orders Cyclops to activate the time vortex, a plan that would kill both Stryfe and Cable. Cyclops reluctantly does so; both men are sucked into a massive vortex that is created as the tower explodes. Cyclops and Jean Grey begin to suspect that either Stryfe or Cable is Cyclops' son Nathan Christopher Summers, who Cyclops was forced to abandon and send into the future after Apocalypse infected him with a techno-virus.

Mister Sinister has a minion, Gordan, open the canister given to him by Stryfe, only to find it apparently empty. Though not revealed in X-Cutioner's Song, the canister in fact contained the Legacy Virus.

=== Epilogue ===
Professor X discovers that the techno-organic virus has left him temporarily capable of walking, and spends his few hours without paralysis bonding with Jubilee. Rogue and Gambit hang out together as Rogue agrees to let Gambit be her "eyes" until she regains her sight, laying the groundwork for the two finally becoming a couple. Archangel and Beast rebuild the bar that Cyclops and Jean Grey were kidnapped in and think back to their days as the original X-Men.

== Stryfe's Strike File ==
Stryfe's Strike File was the name of a 1993 X-Men one-shot written by Fabian Nicieza and Scott Lobdell. It included several years worth of foreshadowing of Lobdell and Nicieza's X-Men plotlines, most notably the Legacy Virus plotline. The comic framing device was that the files in the one-shot were on a CD-ROM found at Stryfe's base by Bishop and handed over to Xavier without telling anyone else about it. After nearly two dozen pages of text and picture files, most of which were taken from the trading card inserts included in the individual issues of the crossover, the book ended with a closing sequence where Xavier destroys the disk rather than showing it to Cyclops and Jean Grey.

The book contained entries for Graydon Creed, Threnody, and Holocaust prior to their first appearances elsewhere. Graydon Creed would appear as a villain two months later, Threnody would appear eleven months later, yet Holocaust would not appear in the X-Men comics until the alternate reality Age of Apocalypse storyline. The version found in that storyline differs from the one found in Stryfe's Strike File in that the Age of Apocalypse Holocaust requires a containment suit and is very talkative while the Holocaust in the files does not need a containment suit and is a silent killer.

== Publication ==
1. Uncanny X-Men #294
2. X-Factor #84
3. X-Men (vol. 2) #14
4. X-Force #16
5. Uncanny X-Men #295
6. X-Factor #85
7. X-Men (vol. 2) #15
8. X-Force #17
9. Uncanny X-Men #296
10. X-Factor #86
11. X-Men (vol. 2) #16
12. X-Force #18
13. Uncanny X-Men #297 (Epilogue)
14. X-Force #19 (Epilogue)
15. "Stryfe's Strike File"

=== Collected editions ===
The storyline (except for "Epilogues 1 & 2 " & "Stryfe's Strike File") have been collected into a trade paperback:

- X-Men: X-Cutioners Song (May 1994, ISBN 0-7851-0025-3)

It has also been collected into a hardcover:

- X-Men: X-Cutioners Song (368 pages, October 19, 2011, ISBN 0785156100)

Collects Uncanny X-Men #294-297, X-Factor #84-86, X-Men #14-16, X-Force #16-19 and Stryfe's Strike File

It has also been collected as part of the X-Force Epic Collection (except for the Epilogue 1 from Uncanny X-Men #297):

- X-Force Epic Collection Vol. 2: X-Cutioners Song

Collects Cable: Blood & Metal #1-2, Uncanny X-Men #294-296, X-Factor #84-86, X-Men #14-16, X-Force #16-19, Stryfe's Strike File and New Warriors #31

The storyline has also been included to the X-Men Epic Collection:

- X-Men Epic Collection Vol. 21: The X-Cutioner's Song (520 pages, December 13, 2022, ISBN 1302948288)

Collects: Uncanny X-Men #289-296, X-Men (vol. 2) #10-16, X-Factor #84-86, and X-Force #16-18

== Publication history ==
In 1991, the X-Men franchise had reached a popularity level unheard of at the time, with the release of the high selling X-Men (vol. 2) #1 and X-Force #1, as well as the contributions of popular artists Jim Lee, Rob Liefeld and Whilce Portacio to the main X-Men books. But by 1992, Portacio, Lee and Liefeld left Marvel Comics to form their own comic company Image Comics, alongside several other high-profile Marvel artists. New writers and artists were quickly drafted to replace the departing fan favorite artists, most notably writers Scott Lobdell and Fabian Nicieza and artist Greg Capullo.

At a writer's retreat held by the X-Men writing staff in 1992, the writers began to plan which direction for the X-Men. A massive crossover had been decided upon prior to the formation of Image Comics and it was decided by the new writers to continue with the plan as a means to keep attention on the X-Men books at the time. The subject of the crossover was having the X-Men face their biggest enemies at the time, Stryfe, Apocalypse, and Mr. Sinister, and revealing the origin of the popular X-Force leader Cable.

A year earlier it was heavily implied that Cable was Nathan Christopher Summers, the infant son of X-Man Cyclops and Madelyne Prior. Meanwhile, Stryfe revealed that he had the same face as Cable. As fans had picked up on these plot threads, Fabian Nicieza pushed for the reveal that Stryfe was the time-displaced Nathan Summers and that Cable was the heroic clone of the missing Summers child.

During the planning of the crossover, Scott Lobdell and Fabian Nicieza wanted to feature the return of Magneto, believed to be dead at the time, during the storyline, mainly to provide fans with an added shock moment and to add to the impact of the story, which would have the X-Men and their allies face down against their worst enemies in a single crisis. Peter David sarcastically proclaimed that Magneto should remove Wolverine's adamantium skeleton upon his return. While the plan to make Magneto's return was dropped from the storyline, David's suggestion would be used when the writers brought Magneto back the following year as part of the "Fatal Attractions" storyline.

There is a long-standing rumor that X-Men editor Bob Harras forced Lobdell and Nicieza to change the ending of the story to remove what was supposed to be the main drawing point of the storyline: Cable's origin. However, Nicieza has stated that this was not the case. The full details of the origin Cable (and Stryfe) would be held back until 1994, when it was revealed that Cable was in truth Nathan Christopher Summers and that Stryfe, not Cable, was the clone.

== Reception ==
Sales of X-Cutioner's Song were considerably higher than the issues of the participating series which preceded and succeeded it. However, the story was considered a disappointment by fans, chiefly because it had been promised that it would reveal Cable's origin, but instead provided only cryptic and sometimes confusing hints about the identities of Cable and Stryfe.

== Aftermath ==
Stryfe and Apocalypse were both brought back to life. Excluding the "Age of Apocalypse" storyline, Apocalypse would return in Cable #19, while Stryfe would return as a ghost who possessed Cable. The story ended with Cable freeing himself from Stryfe's control, sending Stryfe's spirit to Hell for all eternity. Stryfe reappeared when his ghost attempted to escape Hell by possessing X-Force member Warpath but was foiled by the members of X-Force.

Ultimately Stryfe would be brought back to life as a time anomaly, having shown up out of the blue alongside the Dark Riders during a crossover between Cable and X-Man and would go on to bedevil the X-Men until his most death during the Gambit/Bishop mini-series. Stryfe would yet again return after the "Decimation" storyline and appeared to perish again, although it is unknown if it is a Stryfe from another reality.

The major long-term result of "X-Cutioner's Song" was the Legacy Virus. Stryfe had earlier given Mister Sinister a canister that he claimed contained two thousand years worth of genetic material from the Summers bloodline. When Sinister opened it after Stryfe was apparently killed by Cable, he found nothing inside. The canister actually contained a plague, Stryfe's "Legacy" to the world. The virus, presumably from the future, was 100% fatal and struck only mutants, including Colossus's sister, Illyana Rasputin, causing Colossus to leave the X-Men. It later infected the human doctor and long-time X-Men ally, Moira MacTaggert. MacTaggert would ultimately develop a cure just before her death, though it would cost the mutant Peter Rasputin (Colossus) his life, due to the cure requiring a mutant to die in order to activate it.

== In other media ==
The 1995 video game X-Men: Gamesmaster's Legacy is loosely based on the events of "X-Cutioner's Song".

== See also ==
- The Executioner's Song
