= Doctor Nemesis =

Name of two Marvel characters

Doctor Nemesis is the name of two characters appearing in American comic books published by Marvel Comics and Ace Magazines. The first is James Bradley, a superhero and associate of the X-Men, while the second is Michael Stockton, a supervillain and enemy of Ant-Man.

== Publication history ==
The first version (James Bradley) was a derivative version of the eponymous Golden Age character, who originally appeared in Ace Magazines' Lightning Comics. He is a co-creator of the original Human Torch android, and appears in Uncanny X-Men as a member of the X-Club. Doctor Nemesis appeared in Cable and X-Force, a series by writer Dennis Hopeless and artist Salvador Larroca that debuted in December 2012.

The second version (Michael Stockton) was unidentified in Marvel Feature #4, but officially debuted in Marvel Feature #9 and was created by Mike Friedrich and Craig Russell.

== Fictional character biography ==
=== James Bradley ===
Doctor Nemesis
- Doctor Nemesis as depicted in Uncanny X-Men #511. Art by Greg Land.

Publication information
- Publisher: Ace Magazines, Marvel Comics
- First appearance: Lightning Comics #6 (April 1941; historic); The Invaders vol. 2 #1 (May 1993; Marvel Universe)
- Created by: The creators of the version published by Ace Magazines are unknown. The Marvel Comics version of the character was co-created by Roy Thomas (writer) and Dave Hoover.

In-story information
- Alter ego: James Bradley
- Species: Human mutant
- Team affiliations: X-Men; X-Club; Battle-Axis; X-Force
- Notable aliases: Doctor Death
- Abilities: Accomplished investigator and hand to hand combatant "Self-evolved" intellect Enhanced immune system and eyesight Prolonged longevity

James Bradley was born in San Francisco in 1906. Although primarily trained as a medical physician, he began working with Phineas Horton in developing the original android Human Torch during the late 1930s. A design flaw causes the android to burst into flames upon exposure to oxygen, which Horton refuses to fix. During a display, the android catches on fire and is labeled a menace. Bradley breaks off his partnership with Horton shortly afterward, taking his unfinished second android with him.

Sometime before 1941, Bradley completed his work and the second android acted as the superhero Volton, the Human Generator, from late 1941 to early 1942. Bradley led Volton to believe it was a scientist named Guy Newton who had discovered how to utilize his body's power to generate static electricity. Around this time, Bradley also decided to become a masked crimefighter, too. While working by day at Mercy Hospital in New York City, he would don a surgical mask to fight corruption and crime as Doctor Nemesis.

According to Jess Nevins' Encyclopedia of Golden Age Superheroes, Bradley "uses his fighting ability and hypodermic needle full of truth serum to fight gangs and costumed madmen like the hypnotic Swami, the Surgeon (who unleashes plague-bearing rats on the city), and Dr. Quartz, the comic book version of the sociopathic vivisector who was Nick Carter's arch-enemy in the dime novels."

After a number of adventures, Doctor Nemesis is approached by agents of the Third Reich to form a group of costumed beings. Signifying a change in tactics, Bradley becomes known as Doctor Death and recruits Human Meteor, Spider Queen, Strongman, and Volton for the group Battle-Axis, which takes extreme efforts to force the United States out of participating in World War II. After the war, Bradley reassumes the Doctor Nemesis persona and moves to Santiago del Estero, Argentina to hunt Nazi refugees.

Bradley is approached by Beast and Angel to help assist in undoing the effects of M-Day, when most mutants lost their powers. The group travels through time to turn-of-the-century San Francisco to obtain genetic samples. It is revealed that Doctor Nemesis is a mutant who possesses a "self-evolved intellect", which allowed him to greatly extend his longevity through serums of his creation. Doctor Nemesis' father, also an inventor, is killed when he helps the X-Club stop the Hellfire Club's Sentinel from ravaging across San Francisco. Nemesis' mother later dies in childbirth, as she is already in a weakened condition from the trauma of losing her spouse. Unknown to the rest of the X-Men, Doctor Nemesis assists his mother with his own birth. The X-Club are ultimately unable to obtain the couple's genetic samples; they have apparently been stopped by the Dreaming Celestial as part of some grand cosmic plan.

Doctor Nemesis becomes a citizen of the mutant nation Krakoa, where he helps create medicinal drugs that bring Krakoa international recognition.

=== Michael Stockton ===
Doctor Nemesis

Publication information
- Publisher: Marvel Comics
- First appearance: Marvel Feature #4 (July 1972, unofficial), Marvel Feature #9 (May 1973, official)
- Created by: The early appearance in Marvel Feature #4 was co-written by Roy Thomas and Mike Friedrich, and the artwork was by Herb Trimpe. His reintroduction in Marvel Feature #9 was written by Mike Friedrich and drawn by P. Craig Russell.

In-story information
- Alter ego: Michael Stockton
- Species: Human
- Team affiliations: A.I.M
- Abilities: Size manipulation via device in costume

Michael Stockton was a scientist who was inventing a way to look into and study the subatomic worlds. He succeeded and stumbled onto one that was ruled by the monstrous tyrant Tim Boo Ba.

Stockton becomes associated with A.I.M and stationed in a laboratory near Hank Pym's home. He plots to steal Pym's technology and involves himself in the plot of criminal M'Sieu Tete. Ant-Man and Spider-Man battle Tete's gang until Tete injects the two with a virus to gain their cooperation. Ant-Man and Spider-Man retrieve an antidote for the virus, but Ant-Man is left in a shrunken state. Meanwhile, Stockton invades Hank Pym's lab and steals his technology.

Stockton returns Ant-Man to his normal size, but puts Wasp in a weakened state that will kill her unless she receives further treatment. Doctor Nemesis forces Ant-Man to take him to Avengers Mansion, plotting to steal the scientific research held there, but is ultimately defeated by Ant-Man.

Stockton heads the development of the M.A.U. (Mass Acquisition Unit), with Bill Foster and Edward Hawkins assisting him. The M.A.U. overloads and causes everything in the area to grow to giant size until Foster shuts it down. Foster discusses the M.A.U. with Hawkins, who states that it is too dangerous and would act as a warhead. Stockton attempts to weaponize the M.A.U., but Foster destroys the device and Stockton is sent to prison.

When the Creatures from Kosmos attacks Earth, Doctor Nemesis shrinks himself to microscopic size and ends up on Tim Boo Ba's world. He is captured and tortured by Tim Boo Ba and his minions before returning to normal size and escaping. Doctor Nemesis is later incarcerated at the Big House, a prison where all inmates are shrunken using Pym Particles to lessen the chances of them escaping. He attempts to warn his cellmates of Tim Boo Ba, but none of them believe him.

== Powers and abilities ==
The James Bradley incarnation of Doctor Nemesis is a mutant with a self-described "self-evolved" intellect, making him an instinctively-intuitive scientific and technological genius. He has delayed his own aging and enhanced his own immune system, leading to a prolonged lifespan. He has also enhanced his eyesight, allowing him to see genetic anomalies, including the Nazi clones he primarily hunted before joining the X-Club, over a distance of 200 m (660 ft). Additionally, Nemesis is a polymath who has made major advances in handheld weaponry, medicine, chemistry, genetics, interdimensional travel, computer programming, and robotics. He arms himself with twin handguns that fire hypodermic projectiles containing dangerous narcotics. The projectiles were tailored to pierce body armor. He developed a sedating truth serum for use as an investigator. He created androids, including the sentient superhuman android Volton. He is an accomplished investigator and hand-to-hand combatant.

The Michael Stockton incarnation of Doctor Nemesis can manipulate his size using Pym Particles.

== Other versions ==
=== Age of X ===
An alternate universe version of James Bradley appears in Age of X.

=== Secret Wars (2015) ===
During the "Secret Wars" storyline, two versions of James Bradley / Doctor Nemesis appear as residents of Battleworld:

- The Doctor Nemesis of the Domain of Apocalypse is a servant of Dark Beast and Mister Sinister, who augmented him with the DNA of various mutants. Doctor Nemesis is later killed by Jean Grey.
- A version of Doctor Nemesis resides in the Battleworld domain of Limbo.
