= Stryfe =

- Cover of Uncanny X-Men #296. Art by Brandon Peterson.

Publication information
- Publisher: Marvel Comics
- First appearance: The New Mutants #86 (February 1990)
- Created by: Louise Simonson (writer); Rob Liefeld (artist/co-writer)

In-story information
- Species: Human mutant clone
- Team affiliations: Mutant Liberation Front; Dark Riders
- Notable aliases: Chaos Bringer, Scion of the Dark Lord, Nathan Summers / Cable
- Abilities: Telekinesis; Telepathy; Superhuman strength and durability

Stryfe is a supervillain appearing in American comic books published by Marvel Comics, most commonly in conflict with the superhero team X-Force. He is a clone of Cable from an alternate future timeline.

== Publication history ==
The character was created by Louise Simonson and Rob Liefeld, and first appears in The New Mutants #86 (February 1990), a cameo appearance in which his head cannot be seen. His first full appearance was in the following issue, The New Mutants #87 (March 1990). A clone of Cable, Stryfe is the main antagonist in the 1990s crossover X-Cutioner's Song, the 2009 X-Force/Cable crossover Messiah War, and the 2014 Cable & X-Force/Uncanny X-Force crossover "Vendetta".

Stryfe appears as the main villain of the 2018–2019 run of X-Force.

Stryfe was created as a mystery villain whose identity was initially obscured — his face remained hidden during his first cameo appearance to build suspense. His visual design by Rob Liefeld — featuring heavy armor and a helmet — was deliberately intended to mirror Cable's appearance, foreshadowing the reveal that the two characters are clones of each other. The character's name derives from the word "strife", reflecting his role as a chaos-bringer.

== Fictional character biography ==
Stryfe is a clone of Nathan Summers who was created by Mother Askani as a backup in case of Nathan's death from the techno-organic virus. The Askani ultimately succeed in halting Nathan's virus, while the clone is kidnapped by Apocalypse. Apocalypse takes the child as his own and names him Stryfe, intending to use him as a host body. Years later, Apocalypse is about to transfer his essence into Stryfe only to discovers that Stryfe is a clone and cannot act as a vessel. After Apocalypse's essence is dispersed, Stryfe is raised by Apocalypse's second-in-command Ch'vayre.

Stryfe grows up to be an embittered madman and opponent of Cable, intending to take vengeance on both what he believes to be his real parents (Cyclops and Jean Grey) and his spiritual parent Apocalypse. In 3806, the New Canaanites take full control of the planet, but Stryfe manages to travel back in time two thousand years. He forms a mutant terrorist group, the Mutant Liberation Front (MLF). Stryfe battles Cable, who learns that Stryfe is his clone. As a final insurance, Stryfe gives Mister Sinister a canister containing the Legacy Virus. During a battle with Stryfe, Cable opens a temporal rift by detonating a self-destruct system, destroying Stryfe's body. Stryfe's consciousness enters Cable's mind, where he stays for some time before leaving.

By unknown means, Stryfe revives and attempts to subjugate Latveria. Stryfe is opposed by Cable and Nate Grey, and at first beats them easily, even going as far as to siphon Nate's power. Madelyne Pryor appears to join forces with Stryfe, but secretly steals the psionic energy from Stryfe and gives it back to Nate. Madelyne, Nate and Cable join forces to defeat Stryfe.

Stryfe experiences a personal existential crisis and becomes depressed at the futility of his efforts after the X-Men manage to cure the Legacy Virus. He hunts down Bishop, who has possessed by the entity Le Bete Noir. Its power rivals the Phoenix Force and threatens to consume Bishop's body and unleash evil upon the universe. However, Stryfe ultimately regrets the path he took and the choices he has made in his life. He frees Bishop from the entity and sacrifices himself to save Earth by absorbing Le Bete Noir into himself. Gambit is suspicious and believes that Cable may have telepathically forced Stryfe to sacrifice himself.

=== Messiah War ===
In the storyline Messiah War, it is revealed that Stryfe was able to transport himself into the future instead of dying, where he was discovered by Bishop. Cable, Deadpool, the time-displaced X-Force and Apocalypse join forces to defeat Stryfe and Bishop. Cable and Hope Summers travel further into the future, the X-Force return to the present, and Apocalypse drags Stryfe away, intending to use him as a new host body.

=== Vendetta ===
Stryfe is able to prevent Apocalypse from using his body as a new host and travels back in time to the present in the Cable and X-Force and Uncanny X-Force crossover "Vendetta". Upon discovering that Bishop has returned to the present, Hope tries to kill him in an act of vengeance. Stryfe appears and kidnaps both and brings the two to an old, abandoned Mutant Liberation Front base. There, he attempts to manipulate Hope into killing Bishop, who has come to realize the error of various past mistakes. Stryfe explains to Bishop how he wants him to suffer after he betrayed him and claims that he was imprisoned and tortured by Apocalypse for years until he planned a successful escape and killed him. Stryfe tries to corrupt Hope by making her give in to her feelings of hatred towards Bishop, convincing her to take revenge and murder Bishop, although he is shackled and refuses to fight back out of remorse. Cable and both teams of X-Force soon intervene and combat Stryfe. Hope sees that Stryfe is trying to undo the lessons which Cable taught and refuses to kill Bishop, but Hope severely injures him. Stryfe is defeated by Cable and both X-Force teams, but before escaping, he telepathically forces Hope to mimic his power with the intention that Hope will destroy her own friends. Bishop helps Hope to disperse Stryfe's energy and the two come to an uneasy truce.

== Powers and abilities ==
Stryfe is a clone of the mutant Cable and shares his abilities of telepathy and telekinesis. However, these abilities are far more powerful than the ones Cable has generally displayed, sufficient to block the use of Cyclops and Jean Grey's superhuman powers. This is because Stryfe was never infected with Apocalypse's techno-organic virus like Cable was. Therefore, he does not have to constantly expend his abilities to keep the virus from consuming his body, which drained Cable's capabilities. Stryfe can use his psionic abilities in a variety of ways such as moving large objects with his mind, reading minds, mind control, telepathically negating and activating the use of other's powers, telepathic camouflage, telekinetic flight, telekinetic force fields, mind transference and telekinetic blasts. Stryfe also has far more control over his massive psionic abilities than Cable or Nate Grey, apparently from having a whole lifetime of experience of learning how to use his powers which his alternate counterparts never had. Stryfe also possessed other abilities through genetic manipulation similar to those that Cable achieved through cybernetic augmentation, including superhuman strength and durability.

Stryfe wears battle armor that is highly impervious to damage. He has used various advanced weaponry and technology from the 39th century of his alternate future.

== Other versions ==
=== Ultimate Marvel ===
An alternate universe version of Stryfe from Earth-1610 appears in Ultimate X-Men. This version is a mutant supremacist who is convinced that Professor X was killed by the United States government and that mutants should fight against the government. He possesses the mutant ability to cause "strife" within people's minds, causing them to voice whatever is bothering them. It is later revealed that Stryfe is working with Fenris to promote mutant unrest so they can sell Sentinels to the government.

=== Deadpool Pulp ===
General Stryfe, a character based on Stryfe, appears in Deadpool Pulp. He is a general who, alongside Cable and J. Edgar Hoover, hires Wade Wilson to retrieve a stolen nuclear briefcase. Stryfe is later killed by Deadpool.

== In other media ==
=== Television ===
Stryfe makes a non-speaking appearance in the X-Men: The Animated Series episode "Beyond Good and Evil" Pt. 4.

=== Video games ===
- Stryfe appears as the final boss of X-Men: Gamesmaster's Legacy, a 1995 side-scrolling action game for the Game Gear developed by Sega.
- Stryfe appears as a boss in X-Men Legends II: Rise of Apocalypse, voiced by Daniel Riordan.
- Stryfe appears as a playable character in Marvel Contest of Champions.
- Stryfe appears in Marvel Strike Force as a member of the Marauders.
- Stryfe appears in Marvel Snap.

=== Merchandise ===
- Stryfe received an action figure in Toy Biz's X-Force line.
- Stryfe received a die-cast metal action figure in Toy Biz's "Steel Mutants" line as part of a two-pack with Cable.
- Stryfe received an action figure in Hasbro's Marvel Legends line.
- Stryfe received figures in the HeroClix's "Giant-Size X-Men" and "Deadpool and X-Force" sets.

== Reception ==
Sara Century of Collider expressed interest in seeing Stryfe in X-Men '97.
