= Cable (character) =

Marvel Comics fictional character

- Cover art of Cable (Vol. 3) #1 (May 2017). Art by Rob Liefeld.

Publication information
- Publisher: Marvel Comics
- First appearance: As Nathan Summers: The Uncanny X-Men #201 (Jan. 1986); As Cable: The New Mutants #87 (March 1990)
- Created by: Nathan Summers: Chris Claremont; Rick Leonardi; Cable: Louise Simonson; Rob Liefeld

In-story information
- Alter ego: Nathan Christopher Charles Summers
- Species: Human mutant
- Team affiliations: X-Men; Avengers; X-Force; Askani; Six Pack; The Twelve; New Mutants; Avengers Unity Division; S.W.O.R.D.; The Underground; Swordbearers of Krakoa
- Partnerships: Domino; Rachel Summers; Deadpool; Hope Summers
- Notable aliases: Nathan Winters, Nathan Dayspring, Askani'son, Soldier X, Chosen One, Traveler, Kid Cable (Nate Summers)
- Abilities: Telekinesis; Telepathy; Expert marksman and hand-to-hand combatant; Cybernetic enhancements grant superhuman strength and durability; enhanced, multi-spectrum vision; and the ability to interface with technology; Teleportation

Cable (Nathan Christopher Charles Summers) is a character appearing in American comic books published by Marvel Comics, commonly in association with X-Force and the X-Men. Nathan first appeared as an infant in Uncanny X-Men #201 (Jan. 1986) created by writer Chris Claremont and penciler Rick Leonardi, while Cable first appeared in The New Mutants #87 (March 1990) created by writer Louise Simonson and artist/co-writer Rob Liefeld; Cable's origin initially was undecided and he was assumed to be a separate character, but it was later decided that he was an older version of Nathan and a time traveler.

Nathan Summers is the son of the X-Men member Cyclops (Scott Summers) and his first wife Madelyne Pryor (Jean Grey's clone), as well as the "half"-brother of Rachel Summers from the "Days of Future Past" timeline and Nate Grey from the timeline of the "Age of Apocalypse" storyline, the genetic template of the mutant terrorist Stryfe (one of his deadliest enemies), and the adoptive father of Hope Summers. Born in the present-day, Nathan was infected with a deadly techno-organic virus as an infant and was sent into a possible future timeline where his condition could be stabilized. Raised in a violent, unforgiving world, Nathan grew into the warrior Cable and became an enemy of the villain Apocalypse. He later returned to the present-day era, initially arriving some years before his own birth. Since making his home in the modern era, he has worked alongside the X-Men (including Cyclops and Jean Grey) and reformed the New Mutants group into the original X-Force. He had frequent battles against the near-invincible assassin Deadpool, who later became an on-again, off-again ally for years. In the 2018 Extermination mini-series, Cable was killed and replaced by a younger, time-displaced version of himself who decided that the older one was ineffective in his crusade; this younger version (Nate Summers, sometimes called Kid Cable) operated until 2021, when the original, older iteration was revived.

Cable was introduced to a wider audience as a recurring character in X-Men: The Animated Series (1992–1997) and its sequel series, voiced by Lawrence Bayne and by Chris Potter respectively. The character made his live-action cinematic debut in Deadpool 2 (2018), portrayed by Josh Brolin.

== Publication history ==
=== Creation ===
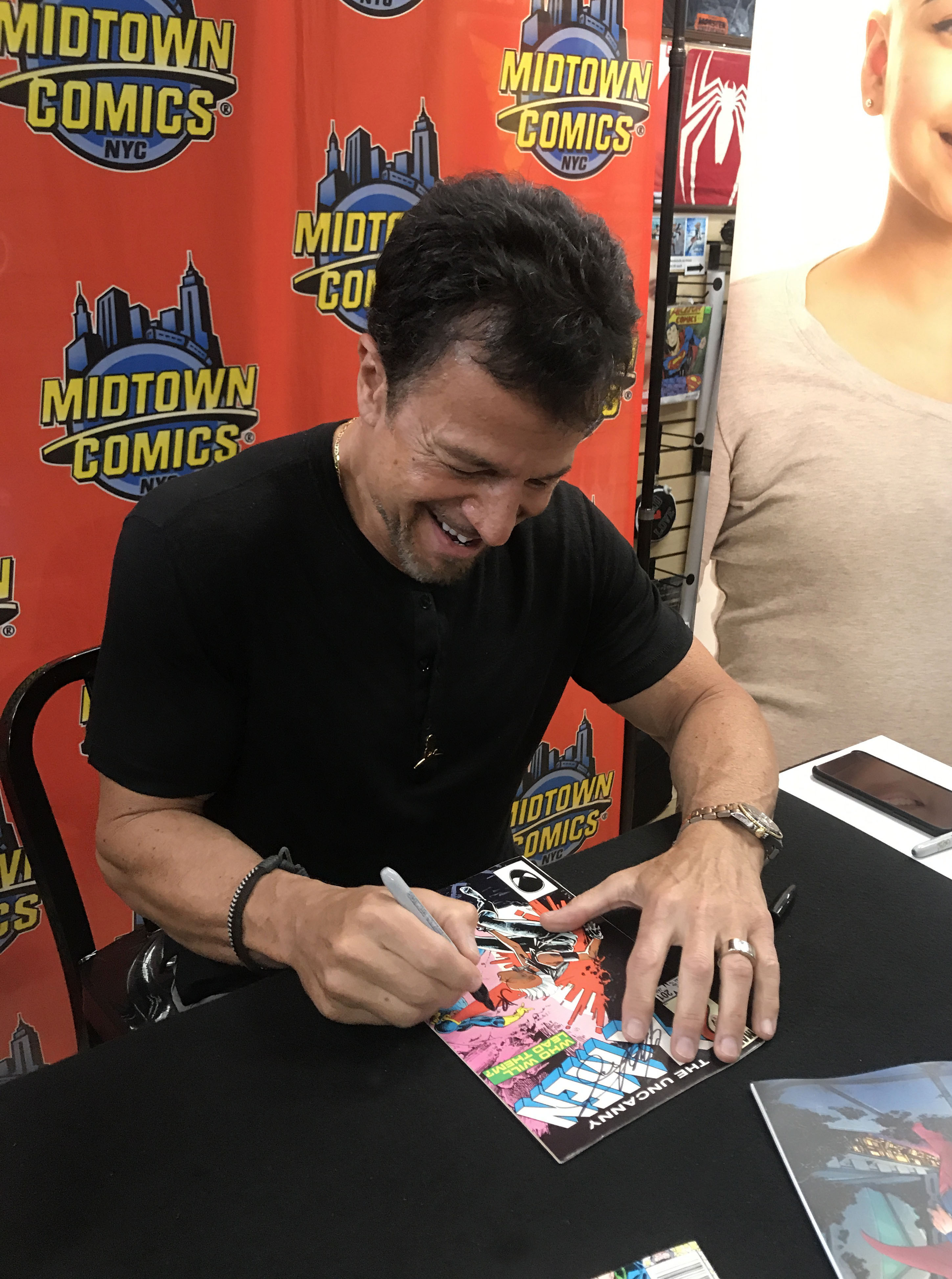
Artist John Romita Jr. signing a copy of The Uncanny X-Men #201, in which Nathan Christopher Charles Summers first appears as an infant

Nathan Christopher Charles Summers is the son of Scott Summers (aka Cyclops), and Madelyne Pryor (who was later revealed in the "Inferno" storyline to be a clone of Jean Grey). Writer Chris Claremont, who had written the series since issue #94 (Aug. 1975), revealed Madelyne to be pregnant in X-Men/Alpha Flight #1 (Dec. 1985). The next depiction of her pregnancy was in The Uncanny X-Men #200, when she goes into premature labor. In the following issue, #201 (Jan. 1986), Nathan first appears as a newborn infant.

The character's first appearance as the adult warrior Cable was at the end of The New Mutants #86 (Feb. 1990). He does not appear anywhere in the issue's story except for the "next issue" teaser. This was followed by a full appearance in The New Mutants #87 (March 1990). At first, Cable was not intended to be the adult version of Nathan Summers, but was created as a result of unrelated editorial concerns. Editor Bob Harras wanted to "shake things up" for the book, and felt a new leader was needed, a sharp contrast from the group's founder and first mentor, Professor X. The book's writer, Louise Simonson, thought a military leader would be a good idea, and Harras tasked the book's artist, Rob Liefeld, to conceptualize the character. Harras may also have suggested the character's bionic eye, while Liefeld developed the character's visual design. In Liefeld's sketches his appearance was dubbed a "Dark Schwarzenegger Type" and derived from Arnold Schwarzenegger's roles in The Terminator and Predator. Both Simonson and Liefeld each separately conceived of the leader being a mysterious time traveler from the future. Liefeld chose the name "Cable" for the character. Liefeld explains the creation of the character:

I was given a directive to create a new leader for the New Mutants. There was no name, no description besides a 'man of action', the opposite of Xavier. I created the look, the name, much of the history of the character. After I named him Cable, Bob suggested Quinn and Louise had Commander X.

Liefeld further explained his inspirations for the character stating "Not only was Cable one of the most popular character's in comic books for over a decade, he was born from my love for Six Million Dollar Man growing up. My family will attest that Six Mill was my religion growing up. Eye, Arm, so many influences, mimicking Steve Austin. Lee Majors has stated repeatedly that all cybernetic characters that followed Six Million Dollar Man owed a debt to the character. He isn't wrong."

Harras and writer/artists Jim Lee and Whilce Portacio, who were writing the X-Men spinoff X-Factor that starred Cyclops and the other four original X-Men, decided that Nathan would be sent into the future and grow up to become Cable. Liefeld, who conceived that Cable and his archenemy Stryfe were one and the same, disliked this idea. Eventually, Stryfe was revealed to be a clone of Cable. In the 1991 X-Factor storyline, Nathan is infected by the villain Apocalypse with a techno-organic virus. Because he can only be saved by the technology of the far-future, Scott reluctantly allows Sister Askani, a member of a clan of warriors dedicated to opposing Apocalypse, to take Nathan into the future so that he can be cured, a one-way trip from which she tells him she and Nathan will be unable to return.

=== New Mutants and X-Force ===
In his first adult appearance, Cable is seen in conflict with Stryfe's Mutant Liberation Front, the United States government, and Freedom Force. The New Mutants intervene and he asks for their help against the Mutant Liberation Front. Cable sees them as potential soldiers in his war against Stryfe, and becomes their new teacher and leader. He comes into conflict with Wolverine, who is revealed to harbor a feud with Cable. Despite this, the two warriors and the New Mutants team up against the MLF. Cable also leads the New Mutants against Cameron Hodge and the Genoshans in the 1990 "X-Tinction Agenda" storyline.

With the aid of Domino, Cable reorganizes the New Mutants into X-Force. The New Mutants ended with issue #100, with Cable and other characters then appearing the following month in X-Force #1. The X-Force series provided further detail for the character's back story revealing that he was from the future and that he had traveled to the past with the aim of stopping Stryfe's plans as well as preventing Apocalypse's rise to power. Cable traveled between the 1990s and his future with his ship Graymalkin, which contained a sentient computer program called Professor (later known as Prosh), the future version of the program built into X-Factor's Ship.

In 1992, the character starred in a two issue miniseries, Cable: Blood and Metal, written by Fabian Nicieza, pencilled by John Romita, Jr., and inked by Dan Green, published in October and November of that year. The series explored Cable and the villain Stryfe's ongoing battle with one another, and its effect on Cable's supporting cast.

=== Cable vol. 1 and Soldier X ===
Shortly after Blood and Metal, Cable was given his own ongoing series titled Cable. Issue #6 (Dec. 1993) confirmed the character to be Nathan Christopher Summers, the son of Cyclops (Scott Summers) and Madelyne Pryor (Jean Grey's clone) who had been taken to the future in X-Factor #68 (July 1991), introduced by writer Chris Claremont, and appeared in Uncanny X-Men #201 (Jan. 1986). The series ran for 107 issues from May 1993 until September 2002 before being relaunched as Soldier X, which lasted 12 more issues until Aug. 2003.

The 1994 miniseries The Adventures of Cyclops and Phoenix provided further information on the character's back story. In the future, Mother Askani, a time-displaced version of Rachel Summers, pulled the minds of Scott and Jean into the future where, as "Slym" and "Redd", they raised Cable for twelve years. During their time together, the "family" prevented Apocalypse from transferring his essence into a new body, ending his reign of terror. It is furthermore established that Mister Sinister created Cyclops' son Nathan (who became the time-traveling soldier Cable) to destroy Apocalypse.

=== Cable & Deadpool, Cable vol. 2 ===
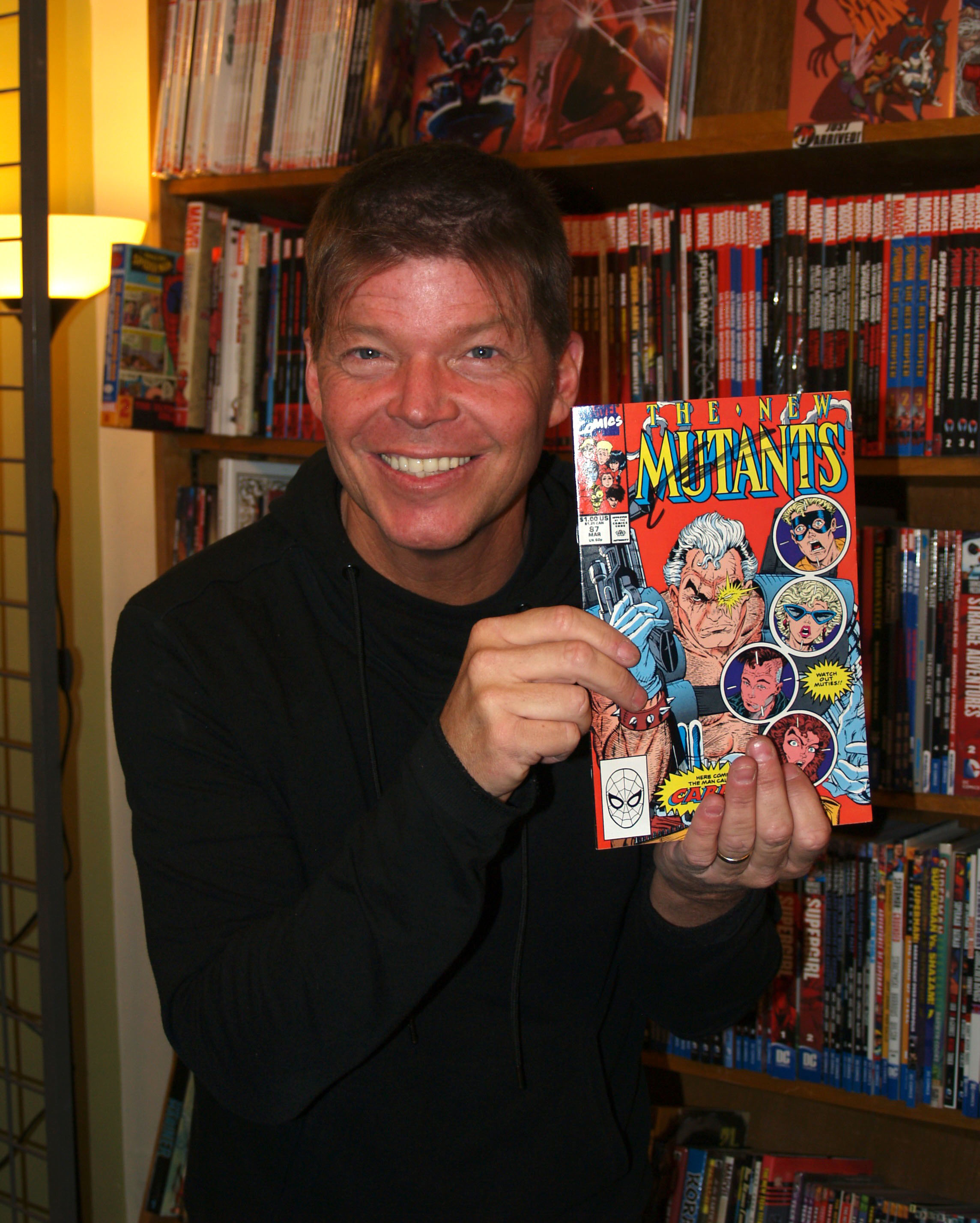
The character's co-creator, Rob Liefeld, holding up a copy of New Mutants #87, in which the character made his first full appearance

After his solo series ended, Cable was paired with the mercenary Deadpool in a new ongoing series titled Cable & Deadpool. The series largely dealt with Cable's efforts to change the world for the better, including turning his old spaceship Graymalkin into the floating utopian island of Providence. The first story arc of the series features a Cable who has learned to suppress his techno-organic virus to a nearly effortless degree, allowing him to access the better part of his vast psionic powers. He gains a power level similar to his Nate Grey counterpart from the Age of Apocalypse reality and tries to use them to force the people of the world to live in peace.

=== Avengers: X-Sanction ===
On July 27, 2011, Marvel announced at San Diego Comic-Con the return of Cable. The new project, originally titled as "Cable Reborn", was re-titled as Avengers: X-Sanction, written by Jeph Loeb and drawn by Ed McGuinness. The miniseries served as a lead-in to the Avengers vs. X-Men storyline beginning in April 2012.

=== Cable and X-Force ===
Cable's next appearance was in a new series, Cable and X-Force by writer Dennis Hopeless and artist Salvador Larroca. The series debuted in December 2012 and features Cable and a new fugitive team, unofficially referred to by the Marvel Universe media as the new "X-Force". This version of X-Force initially consists of Cable, Colossus, Doctor Nemesis, Domino, and Forge. This series focuses on eliminating disasters based on mysterious visions that Cable is receiving, resorting to occasionally more brutal methods than the prime X-teams would use. After the events of "Avengers X-Sanction" Cable is forced to wear an eye patch and an advanced harness for his non-functioning left arm that was created by Forge. Although Hope healed his arm, it is useless because it is not his original arm as it has been destroyed a few times, notably in his battles with Silver Surfer and Bastion.

=== X-Force ===
Continuing from Cable and X-Force Cable puts together a new X-Force team with Psylocke, Dr. Nemesis, Fantomex, Marrow and new recruit MeMe to track down and deal with mutant threats using lethal force. The story is written by X-Men: Legacy writer Simon Spurrier. Cable is infected with an extra-dimensional Super Soldier Serum that provides superpowers at the cost of killing them in around a year, however Cable is injected with an early version designed to kill him in a day. Cable's daughter Hope accidentally copies this virus, since it is based on superpowers, and has to be placed into a coma to save her life. Cable cannot defeat the virus either, so he creates a new clone each day to replace himself but each clone still has only one day to live. Cable and X-Force eventually track down the man Volga who created the biotech virus and defeat him. However, Fantomex goes insane from needing to "be the best" and betrays the team using new god-like powers derived from a digitized form of the Volga Effect he had copied during a tryst with MeMe. Nemesis and Forget-Me-Not unleashes hundreds of Cable clones to fight him, with Hope eventually stopping Fantomex and saving Cable after the last clone is killed wherein her father stepped up to bat while about to catch fire from Volga's poison. Hope then takes over as leader of X-Force and "fires" Cable for his morally questionable methods.

=== Cable and Deadpool: Split Second ===
After traveling through time and fixing several mistakes that a future Deadpool caused, Cable and present-Deadpool eventually fix the timeline. The effects on the timeline causes Cable to revert to his original "status quo", with his robotic arm and his original telekinesis and telepathic power set.

=== Uncanny Avengers ===
Cable is seen in the year 2087 dealing with some unidentified issue related to Stryfe, in the aftermath of an Inhuman attack that covers the city of Boston in sentient plant life led by the Shredded Man. He and his A.I. Belle eventually joins the rest of the Uncanny Avengers helping Synapse in the present and helps deal with the Inhuman causing the problems, before deciding to join the team when he learns the team's true mission is dealing with the Red Skull with Professor Xavier's brain and powers. After Captain America disbands the Uncanny Avengers in the aftermath of the "Civil War II" storyline and Cable and Rogue team up with villains Sebastian Shaw and Toad to find a cure for the Terrigen Mists, Rogue continues the team in their mission to stop the Red Skull.

=== Cable vol. 3/4, Death, Young Cable ===
After the events of Secret Wars storyline, Cable stars in his third ongoing monthly series, as part of Marvel's 2017 "X-Men: ResurrXion" relaunch of its X-Men and Inhumans-related books. In this series, Cable is depicted as a member of an organization that protects the Marvel universe timeline from damage caused by time travel. The first arc of this series "Conquest", sees Cable tracking down a time-traveling villain. The second arc, "The Newer Mutants", has Cable assemble a team trying to determine who is murdering Externals. The third arc, "Past Fears", spans five eras of Cable's history and sees him battling the techno-organic villain Metus.

During a series called "Extermination" by Ed Brisson and Pepe Larraz, Cable was assassinated by his younger self who takes his place. Later, "Old" Cable returns and obtains a position in S.W.O.R.D., but assisted his younger self defeating Stryfe, ensuring the younger one is sent back in time.

=== Inglorious X-Force ===
In Inglorious X-Force by Tim Seeley, Cable fails to prevent the assassination of the first mutant President of the United States—revealed to be Kamala Khan—and returns to the present but is inflicted with partial amnesia and left with a cryptic message. He reforms X-Force and recruits Khan into the team for her protection. However, based on the clues he received, Cable suspects each member of X-Force of being Kamala's future assassin.

== Powers and abilities ==
Cable was born with telepathic and telekinetic abilities. The extent to which he has been able to utilize these powers has varied dramatically throughout his appearances. Originally, both were limited by his need to restrain his techno-organic infection, and his powers were negligible compared to his more traditional fighting skills. Following the subsidence of the infection, they gradually increased to the point where they were similar in magnitude to those of Nate Grey, to whom he is genetically identical. At their height, he demonstrated the ability to simultaneously levitate the floating city of Providence and combat the Silver Surfer.

Following that story, his powers were burnt out and he replaced both with technological substitutes. He later lost and regained his abilities again when he was de-aged during House of M while mending Deadpool's maligned physiology as he progressed to his proper age. Cable himself stated that both his telepathy and telekinesis have faded to nothing.

Cable has fought Wolverine to a stalemate, defeated Captain America in hand-to-hand combat, and defeated Falcon, Red Hulk, and Iron Man using both brute force and wit, all while Cable was in severe pain and hours away from dying of his techno-organic infection.

When Professor Xavier's son Legion travels back in time to kill Magneto in the "Legion Quest" storyline, Beast notes that Cable possesses "latent time-travel abilities". With the assistance of Shi'ar technology, Professor Xavier "jump-starts" this ability while Jean Grey telekinetically holds Cable's body together, allowing Cable to send his consciousness into the past.

His techno-organic body parts possess enhanced strength and durability, and his techno-organic left eye gives him enhanced eyesight, allowing him to see farther than a normal human and in the infrared spectrum. He is also able to interface his techno-organic body parts with other types of machinery, an ability that allows him to hack into computers, open electronic locks, and travel through time.

In the "Messiah War" storyline, during the fight with his clone Stryfe, Cable demonstrates the ability to hide others from Stryfe's mental view, implying that at least he retains some of his telepathic powers. He also still possesses some of his telekinesis, but he is using it solely to keep the techno-organic virus in his body at bay. As well as holding onto just enough telepathic power to simulate and facilitate technopathy through the use of future Stark Industries technology.

As of the end of the "Avengers: X-Sanction" storyline, Hope Summers has apparently cured Cable of the techno-organic virus using the Phoenix Force, and appears to at least have his telepathy. As a result, his cybernetic eye and arm have been restored to flesh and blood, although almost nonfunctional and atrophied, forcing Cable to wear an eyepatch (hiding a psimitar-like implant) and use an enhanced brace, made by Forge and laden with special weaponry. Due to a future Hope's tampering with his mind, he also gained the ability to see multiple possible future events before they unfolded.

After being afflicted by a derivative of the super soldier formula from an alternate reality, Cable was left incapacitated as the faulty chemical weapons test would cause his physiology to self-destruct if left unchecked. To compensate for his genetic instability, he had Dr. Nemesis place his body in suspended animation until they could find a cure for his condition. In the meantime, Cable would operate his X-Force team through short-lived clones who had a fraction of his precognition and a shortened lifespan due to being carbon copies with the faulty Volga Effect serum coursing in their systems. Making his clones useful for kamikaze attacks as they only last about a day's time before violently detonating on their own or when they whistle an audio failsafe to trigger it.

In Deadpool & Cable: Split Second, Cable once again loses most of his powers, but retains his precognition. He regains them along with his cybernetics as a result of Deadpool repairing Cable's personal timeline.

Cable not only regained his psionic abilities, he had even regained the underlying potential he had always possessed since infancy. Having engaged in a psionic battle with a clone of the Red Skull, who had stolen the brain of the deceased Charles Xavier, the clone revealed that Mr. Summers was in fact an omega level mutant. Nathan often makes use of a spear-like morph weapon called the Psi-Mitar, which was originally a long staff with a spear point on one end and a scythe blade on the other, used primarily by the Askani. It functions as a focus and amplifier for telepathic or telekinetic power, which it can combine then project as powered psychic force blasts.

Apart from his superhuman abilities, Cable has been said to have a brilliant mind for military tactics.

=== Techno-organic virus ===
The techno-organic virus is a virus that transforms organic material into techno-organic material, which resembles both machinery and living tissue. All techno-organic cells function like independent machines, and carry both the virus and all information on their carriers. This includes memories and appearance, allowing a damaged techno-organic being to rebuild itself from a single cell. The virus is naturally carried by the alien Technarchy, with Apocalypse creating a second version of the virus.

== Reception ==
- In 2014, Entertainment Weekly ranked Cable 6th in their "Let's rank every X-Man ever" list.
- In 2018, CBR.com ranked Cable 11th in their "8 X-Men Kids Cooler Than Their Parents (And 7 Who Are Way Worse)" list.
- In 2018, CBR.com ranked Cable 1st in their "X-Force: 20 Powerful Members" list.

== Influence ==
Artist Alex Ross drew upon his dislike of Liefeld's design of Cable when Ross designed the character Magog for the 1996 miniseries Kingdom Come. Following writer Mark Waid's instructions that the character's appearance be based on aspects of superhero design trends of the time that they disliked, Ross said of Cable, "That's a character that Mark Waid invented that was really just put to me like come up with the most God awful, Rob Liefeld sort of design that you can. What I was stealing from was – really only two key designs of Rob's – the design of Cable. I hated it. I felt like it looked like they just threw up everything on the character – the scars, the thing going on with his eye, the arm, and what's with all the guns? But the thing is, when I put those elements together with the helmet of Shatterstar – I think that was his name – well, the ram horns and the gold, suddenly it held together as one of the designs that I felt happiest with in the entire series."

== In other media ==
=== Television ===
- Cable appears in X-Men: The Animated Series, voiced by Lawrence Bayne. This version is from the year 3999, in which he fights an endless war alongside his team Clan Chosen against Apocalypse. While traveling back in time on multiple occasions, he has teamed up the X-Men and Bishop.
  - Nathan Summers / Cable appears in X-Men '97, with Cable voiced by Chris Potter, and Nathan Dayspring voiced by Michael Johnston. He initially appears as an infant who gets kidnapped and infected before being taken to the future in order to survive. Cable later travels back in time to the present before reluctantly joining forces with the X-Men against Bastion and Apocalypse.

=== Film ===
Josh Brolin was cast in a four-picture deal with 20th Century Fox to play Nathan Summers / Cable in their X-Men film series.

In Deadpool 2, Cable is depicted as a mysterious time-traveling soldier from a devastated future who travels back in time to assassinate the young mutant Russell Collins before the latter kills Cable's wife and daughter. After encountering Deadpool's X-Force and the Juggernaut, Cable joins forces with the former, during which Deadpool sacrifices himself to save Russell and avert Cable's future. Cable subsequently sacrifices his ability to return to his time to save Deadpool and stay in the present to ensure his family has a brighter future.

=== Video games ===
- Cable appears as a playable character in Marvel vs. Capcom 2: New Age of Heroes, voiced again by Lawrence Bayne.
- Cable appears as an exclusive hidden character in the PSP version of X-Men Legends II: Rise of Apocalypse.
- Cable appears as a hidden character in X-Men: Gamesmaster's Legacy.
- Cable appears in X-Men: Reign of Apocalypse.
- Cable appears as a boss in Marvel: Ultimate Alliance 2, voiced by David Aragnov. In the Pro-Registration campaign, the heroes fight and defeat Cable before seeing him arrested. However, he and Hercules are later broken out by Captain America. In the Anti-Registration campaign, Cable commands the player for a mission. Following the Prison 42 incident, Cable goes missing and is presumed dead. He was later added as a playable character in the Xbox 360 and PS3 versions of the game via downloadable content, and was part of the initial roster of heroes in the PS4, Xbox One, and PC versions.
- Cable makes a cameo appearance in Deadpool's ending in Ultimate Marvel vs. Capcom 3. Additionally, Deadpool received a "Cablepool" costume via DLC.
- Cable appears as a playable character in Marvel Super Hero Squad Online.
- Cable appears as an unlockable character in Marvel Avengers Alliance.
- Cable appears in Deadpool, voiced by Fred Tatasciore.
- Cable appears as a playable character in Marvel Heroes, voiced by James M. Connor.
- Cable appears as a playable character in Marvel: Future Fight.
- Cable appears as a playable character in Marvel Puzzle Quest.
- Cable appears as a paid DLC playable character in Marvel Ultimate Alliance 3: The Black Order, voiced again by James M. Connor.
- Cable appears as a purchasable outfit in Fortnite Battle Royale.
