= List of Acolytes members =

This article lists the members of the Acolytes.

== Members ==
Character	Real Name	Joined In	Notes
Original Incarnation
Magneto	Max Eisenhardt a.k.a. "Erik Magnus Lehnsherr"	X-Men: Legacy #2	Founded and led the team.
Chrome	Allen Marc Yuric a.k.a "Angus Osborn"	X-Men: Legacy #2	Died in the crash-landing of Asteroid M. Chrome was a mutant with the ability to fly and transmute matter.
Anne-Marie Cortez		X-Men: Legacy #2	Sister of Fabian Cortez with the power of mind control/empathy. She died in the crash-landing of Asteroid M.
Fabian Cortez		X-Men: Legacy #2	Cortez is able to augment the powers of other mutants. He was killed by Magneto in Magneto: Dark Seduction #4. Cortez was resurrected on Krakoa and joined S.W.O.R.D.
Marco Delgado		X-Men: Legacy #2	Died in the crash-landing of Asteroid M. Delgado could increase his size.
Winters	Nance Winters	X-Men: Legacy #2	Human S.H.I.E.L.D. agent brainwashed by Anne-Marie Cortez.
Second Incarnation
Rusty Collins	Russell Collins	X-Force #25	Former ward of X-Factor with pyrokinetic powers. Killed during Holocaust's attack on Avalon.
Colossus	Piotr Nikolaievitch "Peter" Rasputin	Uncanny X-Men #304	Colossus is a member of the X-Men with the ability to transform his entire body into organic steel. He joined the Acolytes following the death of his sister, Illyana Rasputin. Colossus left the group after Avalon's destruction.
Exodus	Bennet du Paris	X-Factor #92	Former leader of the team and former second-in-command to Magneto with the power of telekinesis and force fields. Exodus was convinced by Professor X to disband the Acolytes in X-Men: Legacy #225.
Frenzy	Joanna Cargill	Uncanny X-Men #298	Formerly a powerful member of the Alliance of Evil and the X-Men (under Jean Grey's mind control).
Javitz	Isaac Javitz	Uncanny X-Men #298	Killed during Holocaust's attack on Avalon. He had the powers of superhuman strength, speed and senses.
Katu	Katu Kath	Uncanny X-Men #300	An Inuk mutant with bionic arms. Katu was killed during Cassandra Nova's attack on Genosha. He had the power to siphon the earths electromagnetic field to create destructive blasts.
Kleinstock Brothers	Harlan, Sven, and Eric Kleinstock	Uncanny X-Men #298	Identical triplets with the power to fuse with each other. Following the brothers' first mission, Eric Kleinstock was killed by Tom Corsi.
Seamus Mellencamp		Uncanny X-Men #300	A mutant with a reptilian appearance. Mellencamp was killed during Cassandra Nova's attack on Genosha.
Milan	Francisco Milan	Uncanny X-Men #300	An electropathic mutant killed during Holocaust's attacks on Avalon.
Neophyte	Simon Hall	Uncanny X-Men #300	Neophyte is a mutant with the ability to become intangible. He survived execution at the hands of the Acolytes, who saw him as a traitor after he reconsidered his motives. Neophyte was banished from the group, but rejoined sometime after the return of Magneto. He retained his powers after M-Day.
Rakkus	David Anthony Rice	Avengers #380	Rakkus had the power to transform into a viral form, allowing him to possess other's bodies. He was killed by the High Evolutionary.
Scanner	Sarah Ryall	Avengers #357	Formerly known as Screener. Has served in many Acolytes Incarnation, was thought to be dead after Cassandra Nova's attack on Genosha, but revealed alive. Scanner lost her powers after M-Day.
Senyaka	Suvik Senyaka	Uncanny X-Men #300	Formerly known as Sanyaka. Senyaka was revealed to be one of Selene's followers in the "Necrosha" event.
Skids	Sally Blevins	X-Force #25	Former ward of X-Factor. Left the team following Rusty's death. Current agent of S.H.I.E.L.D..
Spoor	Andrew Hamish Graves	Uncanny X-Men #300	Spoor is a mutant with the ability to manipulate others via pheromones. He was killed during Cassandra Nova's attacks on Genosha.
Unuscione	Carmella Unuscione	Uncanny X-Men #298	Unuscione is believed to be the daughter of Unus the Untouchable and has the same power of a psionic field. Unuscione retained her powers after M-Day.
Amelia Voght		Uncanny X-Men #300	A mutant with the power to transform herself and solid matter into vapor. She is the former lover of Professor X, but left him after his decision to start the X-Men.
Third Incarnation
Decay	Jacob Lashinski	Quicksilver #9	Died after his own life absorption powers backfired in a battle against the High Evolutionary.
Gargouille	Lavinia LeBlanc	Quicksilver #9	Confirmed to have retained her diminutive based powers following M-Day.
Joseph		Quicksilver #9	Died in X-Men (vol. 2) #87 after losing physical cohesion while communing with the electromagnetic spectrum. Later resurrected by Astra.
Kamal	Kamal el Alaqui	Magneto #2	Presumed either deceased or depowered, losing his matter enhancing powers.
Orator	Victor Ludwig	Magneto #1	Presumed depowered. Former empath.
Projector	Zachary Williams	Quicksilver #9	Confirmed alive and to have retained his force field/shield powers after M-Day. Current whereabouts are unknown.
Fourth Incarnation
Polaris	Lorna Dane	X-Men: Legacy #98	Was a member of the Acolytes on Genosha and led them after Magneto was injured.
Barnacle	Mortimer Everett	X-Men: The Magneto War	Killed during Cassandra Nova's attack on Genosha. Had the power to form his body into a shell.
REM-RAM	Marcus Andrews	X-Men: The Magneto War	Killed during Cassandra Nova's assault on Genosha. Had the ability to read dreams.
Static	Gianna Carina Esperanza	X-Men: The Magneto War	Killed during Cassandra Nova's attack on Genosha. Static had the power to induce paralysis.
Vindaloo	Venkat Katregadda	Uncanny X-Men #366	Confirmed to be alive and to have retained his powers of producing napalm following M-Day. Current whereabouts are unknown.
Fifth Incarnation
Random	Marshall Evan Stone III	X-Men: Legacy Annual 2007	A former member of the Brotherhood of Mutants, Random has malleable skin able to counter most attacks. Following the disbanding of the Acolytes, he left with Amelia Voght, Omega Sentinel, Frenzy and Tempo to seek refuge in San Francisco alongside the X-Men.
Tempo	Heather Tucker	X-Men: Legacy Annual 2007	Former member of the Mutant Liberation Front. Following the disbanding of the Acolytes, she left with Amelia Voght, Omega Sentinel, Frenzy, and Random to seek refuge in San Francisco alongside the X-Men.
Associates
Avalanche	Dominikos Ioannis Petrakis	Quicksilver #6	Associate member under Exodus.
Beast	Dr. Henry "Hank" Phillip McCoy	X-Men: Legacy #3	Brainwashed into joining and fighting the X-Men. However, Beast came to his senses and fought off the Acolytes.
Cyclops	Scott Summers	X-Men: Legacy #3	Brainwashed into joining and fighting the X-Men. However, Cyclops came to his senses and fought off the Acolytes.
Fenris	Andrea & Andreas Von Strucker	Quicksilver #8	Associate members under Exodus.
Feral	Maria Callasantos	Quicksilver #6	Associate member under Exodus.
Gambit	Remy Etienne LeBeau	X-Men: Legacy #3	Brainwashed into joining and fighting the X-Men. However, Gambit came to his senses and fought off the Acolytes.
Omega Red	Arkady Gregorivich Rossovich	Quicksilver #6	Associate member under Exodus.
Omega Sentinel	Karima Shapandar	X-Men: Legacy #208	Was aiding Exodus in keeping Xavier alive. Xavier defeated Exodus and left Magneto and Omega Sentinel behind.
Psylocke	Elizabeth "Betsy" Braddock	X-Men: Legacy #3	Brainwashed into joining and fighting the X-Men. However, Psylocke came to her senses and fought off the Acolytes.
Pyro	St. John Allerdyce	Quicksilver #6	Associate member under Exodus.
Quicksilver	Pietro Django Maximoff	Unknown	Aided Magneto in his ruling over Genosha. Depowered after M-Day, but regained his powers in X-Factor.
Rogue	Anna Marie (surname unrevealed)	X-Men: Legacy #3	Brainwashed into joining and fighting the X-Men. However, Rogue came to her senses and fought off the Acolytes.
Wolverine	James Howlett	X-Men: Legacy #3	Brainwashed into joining and fighting the X-Men. However, Wolverine came to his senses and fought off the Acolytes.
