= Vindaloo (disambiguation) =

Vindaloo is a popular Indian dish.

Vindaloo may also refer to:

- "Vindaloo" (song), a 1998 release by Fat Les
- Vindaloo (comics), a Marvel Comics character
- Vindaloo Records, a former British independent record company (1979–87) based in Birmingham
