= S.W.O.R.D. =

Fictional comic book agency

- The Peak, headquarters of S.W.O.R.D. Art by Steven Sanders.

Group publication information
- Publisher: Marvel Comics
- First appearance: Astonishing X-Men vol. 3 #6 (December 2004)
- Created by: Joss Whedon (writer); John Cassaday (artist)

In-story information
- Type of organization: Intelligence agency
- Base(s): The Peak
- Agent(s): Beast; Abigail Brand; Agent Deems; Henry Peter Gyrich; Lockheed; Spider-Woman; Sydren

S.W.O.R.D.

Series publication information
- Schedule: Monthly
- Format: Ongoing series
- Genre: Science fiction, superhero
- Publication date: January – May 2010
- Number of issues: 5

Creative team
- Writer(s): Kieron Gillen
- Penciller(s): Steve Sanders
- Inker(s): Craig Yeung
- Letterer(s): Dave Lanphear
- Colorist(s): Matt Wilson
- Creator(s): Kieron Gillen; Steve Sanders
- Editor(s): Daniel Ketchum; Nick Lowe; Joe Quesada

Collected editions
- No Time to Breathe: ISBN 0-7851-4076-X

S.W.O.R.D. (Sentient World Observation and Response Department) is a fictional counterterrorism and intelligence agency appearing in American comic books published by Marvel Comics. Its purpose is to deal with extraterrestrial threats to world security and is the space-based counterpart of S.H.I.E.L.D.

The organization appears in several forms of media, such as The Avengers: Earth's Mightiest Heroes and the Marvel Cinematic Universe miniseries WandaVision.

== Publication history ==
S.W.O.R.D. first appeared in Astonishing X-Men vol. 3 #6 (December 2004), and was created by Joss Whedon and John Cassaday.

== Fictional organization biography ==
S.W.O.R.D. was originally an offshoot of S.H.I.E.L.D. However, relations between the two organizations were strained since Nick Fury's departure as director of S.H.I.E.L.D. The head of S.W.O.R.D. is Special Agent Abigail Brand, and its primary command-and-control headquarters are aboard an orbital space station known as the Peak.

=== "Unstoppable" ===
The Astonishing X-Men, as well as Hisako Ichiki (Armor), Ord, and Danger, are taken to deep space by S.W.O.R.D. and Brand. S.W.O.R.D. psychics fail to detect Cassandra Nova in Emma Frost's shattered psyche. Though emotionally wounded, Frost recovers fast enough to be present for the team's departure to Breakworld, where they plan to disable a missile aimed at Earth. Before they reach Breakworld, the group is attacked by enemy vessels.

After creating a diversion, the X-Men and Brand land on Breakworld. Brand, Cyclops, Emma Frost, and Beast land together, while Wolverine, Armor, Colossus, and Kitty Pryde land elsewhere. Another team, consisting of Lockheed, Sydren, and S.W.O.R.D. troops, converge on the Palace of the Corpse.

=== "Secret Invasion" ===
During the 2008 "Secret Invasion" storyline, the Peak is destroyed by a Skrull infiltrator posing as Dum Dum Dugan. Many S.W.O.R.D. agents die in the initial explosion, though others survive due to hostile-environment suits. Brand is encased in one suit and manages to make her way into one of the Skrull ships.

=== "Dark Reign" ===
During the 2008 - 2009 "Dark Reign" storyline, S.H.I.E.L.D. is reformed as H.A.M.M.E.R. under Norman Osborn. In the Beta Ray Bill: Godhunter mini-series, Beta Ray Bill visits Brand aboard the rebuilt Peak to obtain information about Galactus's whereabouts.

== S.W.O.R.D. volume 1 ==
During the 2009 Chicago Comic Con, it was announced that Kieron Gillen would collaborate with Steven Sanders on a S.W.O.R.D. ongoing series that began in November 2009. The new series starts with Henry Peter Gyrich being assigned as S.W.O.R.D. co-commander alongside Abigail Brand. Gyrich persuades the heads of S.W.O.R.D. to have all aliens currently living on Earth deported from the planet while Brand is distracted with another mission.

The series was cancelled with issue #5. The first issue started with estimated direct sales of 21,988, which dropped to 15,113 by the second issue.

== S.W.O.R.D. volume 2 ==
S.W.O.R.D.
- Cover to S.W.O.R.D. (vol. 2) #1, by Valerio Schiti

Publication information
- Publisher: Marvel Comics
- Schedule: Monthly
- Main character(s): Abigail Brand; Cable; Frenzy; Fabian Cortez; Magneto; Manifold; Wiz Kid

Creative team
- Written by: Al Ewing
- Artist: Valerio Schiti
- Editor(s): Editor; Jordan D. White; Assistant Editor; Annalise Bissa; Head of X Jonathan Hickman

S.W.O.R.D. was relaunched in December 2020 as part of "Reign of X". Written by Al Ewing and drawn by Valerio Schiti, the initial team consists of Abigail Brand, Cable, Frenzy, Fabian Cortez, Magneto, Manifold and Wiz Kid.

S.W.O.R.D. is restored when Brand resigns from Alpha Flight, feeling that Alpha Flight's space program was not being properly utilized. In cooperation with the Quiet Council of Krakoa, S.W.O.R.D. becomes Krakoa's representative to the outer universe.

With Brand as Station Commander, S.W.O.R.D. functions with a six-tier organizational structure:

- Technology/Engineering
  - Station Technologist – Wiz Kid (Takeshi Matsuya)
- Logistics
  - Quintician – Manifold (Eden Fesi)
  - Teleport Team
    - Blink (Clarice Ferguson)
    - Lila Cheney
    - Gateway
    - Vanisher (Telford Porter)
    - Amelia Voght
- Medical/Energy Resources
  - Executive Producer – Khora of the Burning Heart; Fabian Cortez (formerly)
- Diplomacy/Negotiation
  - Amabassador Extraordinary – Frenzy (Joanna Cargill)
  - Ambassador In Training – Armor (Hisako Ikichi)
  - Galactic Ambassador – Paibok
- Security
  - Security Director – Cable (Nathan Summers)
  - Security Team
    - Random (Marshall Stone III)
    - Risque (Gloria Muñoz)
    - Forearm (Michael McCain)
    - Slab (Christopher Anderson)
    - Ruckus (Clement Wilson)
    - Thumbelina (Kristina Anderson)
- Observation/Analysis
  - Psionic Analyst – Mentallo (Marvin Flumm)
  - Analysis Team
    - Peepers (Peter Quinn)

S.W.O.R.D. also forms The Six, a multiversal far-retrieval circuit that combines the powers of mutants. There are two stages required for a full retrieval:

1. First Stage – Translocation: a circuit of five mid-to-long range teleporters who act as the anchor for translocation. [Back-up: Nightcrawler and Magik]
2. Second Stage – Retrieval: a circuit of six mutants who combine their protection and augmentation powers to reach different points in space.
  - The Control – Wiz Kid: unify the first stage circuit of teleporters and adjust the mutant circuits in operation. [Back-up: Forge]
  - The Power – Khora of the Burning Heart; Fabian Cortez (formerly): provide the boost required for the circuit operation.
  - The Shield – Armor: generate a protective exoskeleton that extends to the entire circuit. [Back-up: Skids]
  - The Guide – Manifold: trans-locate the entirety of the second stage circuit while saving energy for the retrieval.
  - The Eye – Peepers: spot specific particles of their target. [Back-up: Doc]
  - The Foundry – Risque: create a small field around their target condensing and containing it to help bring it back to Earth. [Back-up: Xorn]

== Roster ==
=== Volume 1 ===
Former members of S.W.O.R.D.
| Character | Alias | Joined in | Notes |
|---|---|---|---|
| Abigail Brand | | Astonishing X-Men (vol. 3) #10 | Leader |
| Sydren | | Astonishing X-Men (vol. 3) #10 | A Drenx who is skilled in hacking and working on alien technology. |
| Agent Paulletz | Not known | Astonishing X-Men (vol. 3) #20 | |
| Cecilia | | S.W.O.R.D. #2 | |
| K'eel R'kt | | Infinity: Against the Tide: Infinite Comic #1 | A Skrull science officer who was rescued from the Builders by Silver Surfer. |

Former members:

- Agent Deems – An autistic S.W.O.R.D. agent.
- Beast
- Benjamin Deeds – A mutant with transmorphing abilities.
- Death's Head
- Henry Peter Gyrich
- Lockheed
- Manifold Tyger – A tiger-like technician who secretly worked for the Providian Order.
- Mindee – An alias of Irma Cuckoo of the Stepford Cuckoos.
- Reilly Marshall – An ex-S.H.I.E.L.D. and S.W.O.R.D. agent who currently works for the U.N. Security Council.
- Spider-Woman

=== Volume 2 ===
| Issues | Characters |
|---|---|
| #1 - #10 | Amelia Voght; Armor; Abigail Brand; Blink; Cable; Doctor Doom; Egg; Elixir; Emma Frost; Forearm; Frenzy; Fabian Cortez; Gateway; Hope Summer; Hulkling; Jean Grey; Khora of the Burning Heart; Lila Cheney; Magneto; Manifold; Mentallo; Paibok; Peepers; Professor X; Proteus; Random; Risque; Storm; Sunfire; Tempus; Vanisher; Wiz-Kid |

== Reception ==
=== Accolades ===
- In 2019, CBR.com ranked S.W.O.R.D. 3rd in their "10 Most Powerful Secret Organizations In Marvel Comics" list.
- In 2022, CBR.com ranked S.W.O.R.D. 10th in their "The Avengers' 10 Best Allies In Marvel Comics" list.

== In other media ==
=== Television ===
S.W.O.R.D. appears in The Avengers: Earth's Mightiest Heroes. This version initially operates out of the Damocles (Kang the Conqueror's captured spaceship) and subsequently at the Hydro-Base, with Carol Danvers and Abigail Brand as agents, Henry Peter Gyrich as a government liaison, and additional support from Sydren and Peter Corbeau.

=== Marvel Cinematic Universe ===
S.W.O.R.D. appears in the Marvel Cinematic Universe miniseries WandaVision. This version of the organization's full name is the Sentient Weapon Observation and Response Division and was founded by Maria Rambeau. Following the events of Avengers: Infinity War, S.W.O.R.D. recovers Vision's body and investigates Westview, New Jersey after Wanda Maximoff places it under a hex.

=== Video games ===
- An alternate universe iteration of S.W.O.R.D. appears in Marvel Super Hero Squad. This version is an evil counterpart of S.H.I.E.L.D.
- S.W.O.R.D. appears in Marvel Avengers Alliance Tactics.

== Collected editions ==
=== Volume 1 ===
| Title | Material collected | Publication date | ISBN |
|---|---|---|---|
| X-Men: S.W.O.R.D. - No Time to Breathe | S.W.O.R.D. (vol. 1) #1–5 | July 7, 2010 | ISBN 0-7851-4076-X |

=== Volume 2 ===
| Title | Material collected | Publication date | ISBN |
|---|---|---|---|
| S.W.O.R.D. by Al Ewing Vol. 1 | S.W.O.R.D. (vol. 2) #1–5 | September 7, 2021 | ISBN 978-1302927516 |
| X-Men: Hellfire Gala | Marauders (vol. 1) #21, X-Men (vol. 5) #21, Planet-Size X-Men #1, S.W.O.R.D. (vol. 2) #6 and material from Classic X-Men #7 | March 1, 2022 | ISBN 978-1846533365 |
| S.W.O.R.D. by Al Ewing Vol. 2 | S.W.O.R.D. (vol. 2) #7–11, Cable Reloaded #1 | February 15, 2022 | ISBN 978-1302931469 |
