= Fixer (Marvel Comics) =

Fictional comic book characters

The Fixer is the name of two characters appearing in American comic books published by Marvel Comics: Roscoe Sweeney and Paul Norbert Ebersol.

Roscoe Sweeney was portrayed by Kevin Nagle in the Marvel Cinematic Universe series Daredevil, while Paul Ebersol has appeared in animated media.

== Publication history ==
The first Marvel Comics character known as the Fixer was Roscoe Sweeney. He first appeared in Daredevil #1 (Apr. 1964), and was created by Stan Lee, Jack Kirby, and Bill Everett.

The second iteration of Fixer was long-time supervillain Paul Ebersol, first appearing in Strange Tales #141 (February 1966) and was created by Stan Lee and Jack Kirby. Much later, he appeared as a regular character in Thunderbolts, until he was forced to leave the team.

== Fictional character biography ==
=== Roscoe Sweeney ===
Roscoe Sweeney

Publication information
- Publisher: Marvel Comics
- First appearance: Daredevil #1 (April 1964)
- Created by: Stan Lee (writer); Jack Kirby (artist); Bill Everett (artist)

In-story information
- Alter ego: Roscoe Sweeney

Roscoe Sweeney was a gangster and crooked fight promoter who was involved in extortion and illegal gambling. He operated as the "Fixer". He paid boxer Jack Murdock to take a fall and lose a fight. Murdock accepted the money, however, the boxer became determined to continue the fight and eventually won by a knockout. The Fixer's right-hand man Slade killed Jack after the fight in retaliation. Learning of his father's murder and vowing to bring men like the Fixer to justice, Matt Murdock became a lawyer as well as the superhero Daredevil. The Fixer and Slade went to Fogwell's Gym where they encountered Daredevil. The Fixer had a fatal heart attack when being chased by Daredevil in the subway and died.

=== Paul Norbert Ebersol ===
Paul Norbert Ebersol
- Fixer (Paul Norbert Ebersol) by Patrick Zircher.

Publication information
- Publisher: Marvel Comics
- First appearance: Strange Tales #141 (February 1966) (as Fixer); The Incredible Hulk (vol. 2) #449 (January 1997) (as Techno)
- Created by: Stan Lee (writer); Jack Kirby (artist)

In-story information
- Alter ego: Paul Norbert Ebersol
- Team affiliations: Advanced Idea Mechanics; Commission on Superhuman Activities; Hydra; Masters of Evil; New Enforcers; Redeemers; Thunderbolts
- Partnerships: Mentallo
- Notable aliases: Techno; Mr. Fix; Ogre; Phil; Advanced Iron Man
- Abilities: Electronics and mechanical genius Robotic body Technoforming

Paul Norbert Ebersol is a scientist from Dayton, Ohio who held a number of odd jobs, including auto mechanic, television repairman, and electronics laboratory assistant. He then became Fixer, a supervillain and genius-level criminal inventor who has often worked for criminal cartels like Hydra.

Fixer later joins Helmut Zemo's incarnation of the Masters of Evil. The team is later rebranded as the Thunderbolts, who masquerade as superheroes, with Fixer assuming the alias of Techno. He is apparently killed by Iron, one of the Elements of Doom, and transfers his mind into a robotic body.

Fixer joins the Redeemers, a government-backed team whereby criminals could shorten their sentences and clear their record. However, most of the team is killed by Graviton. He joined with the reunited Thunderbolts to stop Graviton, and he was one of the team members exiled to Counter-Earth. The team eventually returns to Earth via a rift.

During the "Avengers: Standoff!" storyline, Fixer appears as a prisoner of the S.H.I.E.L.D.-established gated community Pleasant Hill, where Kobik transforms him into a civilian mechanic named Phil. Phil sees through the effects of Kobik's powers and creates a machine to revert himself to normal. After restoring Zemo, who had been similarly transformed, Fixer vows to take revenge on S.H.I.E.L.D. Following the Pleasant Hill incident, Fixer joins Winter Soldier's incarnation of the Thunderbolts with the goal to keep S.H.I.E.L.D. from continuing the Kobik project.

During the "One World Under Doom" storyline, Fixer is among the original Thunderbolts members who join the Fulgar Victoris led by Valentina Allegra de Fontaine as Citizen V. Amidst the showdown in Latveria, Fixer defects to the Thunderbolts and activates the Doombot Protocol Fixer Omega Daffodil to shut down the other Doombots.

Amidst a power vacuum in A.I.M., Madame Masque enlists Fixer to help obtain scientists to get them to go through the same struggles that Tony Stark did to make his first Iron Man armor and abduct Stark. Fixer later goes rogue and combines all the inventions made by the captive scientists to create armor for himself, becoming known as Advanced Iron Man.

== Powers and abilities ==
The second version of Fixer is an intuitive genius at the invention of weapons and other electrical and mechanical devices. Fixer's Techno body can mentally control his robotic body which is capable of assuming virtually any form from blast cannons to pile-drivers to even the form of a space station. To take on larger shapes, Techno physically absorbed the mass of other mechanical materials nearby into himself. Techno's body also could morph into forms that appeared completely organic, as with his assumed guise of Ogre.

=== Equipment ===
The second Fixer has designed numerous devices and paraphernalia for himself, including his body armor. As for weaponry, he has used various devices including bombs, electronic jamming devices, guided missiles, sonic amplifiers, brain-wave scanners, and mind-control pods. He has also built anti-gravity discs which are affixed to his feet and allow flight at the speed of sound, as well as a special mask that contains a three-hour air supply and acts as an air pressure reduction valve, together with enabling flight at high velocity and high altitude.

== In other media ==
=== Television ===
- The Paul Ebersol incarnation of Fixer, renamed Mr. Fix, appears in Iron Man: Armored Adventures, voiced by Donny Lucas. This version is a genius inventor and high-tech arms dealer with ties to the Maggia. In the second season, Justin Hammer has his personal assistant Sasha inject Fix with a nano-virus to force him to make weapons for the former, primarily the Titanium Man armor. Following a disastrous first outing in the armor, Hammer activates the nano-virus, destroying Fix's body and transforming him into an artificial intelligence called Fix 2.0.
- The Paul Ebersol incarnation of Fixer appears in Marvel Disk Wars: The Avengers.
- Roscoe Sweeney appears in Daredevil (2015), portrayed by Kevin Nagle. As in the comics, he has Jack Murdock killed when the boxer refused to take a dive in one of his matches. Following Jack's death, Sweeney hid out in another country under the alias "Al Marino". In the present, Sweeney is subdued by Elektra so Jack's son Matt Murdock can exact revenge. Matt grievously beats Roscoe, but turns him over to the police instead much to Elektra's disappointment.
- The Paul Ebersol incarnation of Fixer, who also takes on the Techno identity, appears in Avengers Assemble, voiced by Rick D. Wasserman. This version is a Stark Industries employee who was fired for giving away company secrets.

=== Film ===
Roscoe Sweeney, renamed Edward "Eddie" Fallon, appears in Daredevil (2003), portrayed by Mark Margolis. This version previously employed a young Wilson Fisk as an enforcer.

=== Video games ===
- The Paul Ebersol incarnation of Fixer appears as a boss and playable character in Marvel: Avengers Alliance.
- Paul Ebersol / Techno appears in Lego Marvel's Avengers via the "Thunderbolts" DLC.
- The Paul Ebersol incarnation of Fixer appears in Marvel: Avengers Alliance 2.

=== Music ===
The industrial band Mentallo and the Fixer derive their name from the Paul Ebersol incarnation of Fixer and his former partner Mentallo.
