= Peepers (Marvel Comics) =

Marvel Comics character

- Peepers as depicted in S.W.O.R.D. (vol. 2) #1 (December 2020). Art by Valerio Schiti.

Publication information
- Publisher: Marvel Comics
- First appearance: Captain America Annual #4 (1977)
- Created by: Jack Kirby

In-story information
- Alter ego: Peter Quinn
- Species: Human mutant
- Team affiliations: The 198; Brotherhood of Evil Mutants; Mutant Force; Resistants; Secret Empire; S.W.O.R.D.
- Notable aliases: Occult, Peeper
- Abilities: Telescopic/microscopic eyesight X-ray vision Eye beams

Peepers (Peter Quinn) is a character appearing in American comic books published by Marvel Comics. He first appeared in Captain America Annual #4 and was created by Jack Kirby.

== Fictional character biography ==
Peter Quinn was born in Cedar City, Utah. He was recruited by Magneto as a mercenary and professional criminal to be part of his new Brotherhood of Evil Mutants. He takes the name Peeper and joins Slither, Shocker, Lifter, and Burner. After the group fails their first mission, Magneto abandons them.

The group changes their name to Mutant Force and offers their services to Mandrill, assisting him in his plot to take over the United States. After being stopped by the Defenders, the members of Mutant Force are arrested. However, they bargain with the U.S. government and briefly become government agents in exchange for a pardon. Peeper and Mutant Force are later employed by Professor Power's Secret Empire.

The Red Skull became the group's new sponsor. They form a terrorist group called the Resistants who pose as mutant rights advocates. To avoid being associated with their old criminal group, many of the members change their identities, with Peepers becoming known as Occult. It is later revealed that the Resistants were one of many groups that were unknowingly controlled by the newly resurrected Red Skull.

The new Captain America, John Walker, loses control during a battle near Carson City, Nevada, and seemingly kills Occult. He survives, but becomes nervous and mentally unbalanced. While in jail, he repeatedly stabs a prisoner who tried to kill Beast at this time. Shortly afterwards, he is released and becomes a bartender at Satan's Circus, a bar for supervillains.

=== Post M-Day ===
Peepers is among the 198 mutants who retain their powers after M-Day, when the Scarlet Witch removes the power of almost every mutant on Earth. He is seen with Mammomax and Erg on the run from the Sapien League. The three take refuge at the Xavier Institute.

=== Messiah Complex ===
During "X-Men: Messiah Complex" storyline, Peepers is seen driving down a road while on the phone with X-Factor Investigations, claiming that he believes he is being followed. After hitting a deer, Peepers loses control of his car and is lodged deep in the brush by the side of the road. While emerging from the wreckage, he is attacked, killed, and eaten by Predator X.

Peepers later appears alive as a resident of Murderworld in All-New, All-Different Marvel. During the Krakoan Age, Peepers joins S.W.O.R.D. under the command of Abigail Brand.

== Powers and abilities ==
Peepers is a mutant with "telescopic eyesight" that enables him to see through solid objects as well as see things that are miles beyond normal vision range or too small for ordinary vision. He can also project beams of energy from his eyes.

== Other versions ==
An alternate universe version of Peepers from Earth-58163 appears in House of M as a member of Magneto's mutant army.

== Reception ==
Peepers has been noted as an underwhelming villain.
