= List of Marvel Comics teams and organizations =

The comic book stories published by Marvel Comics since the 1940s have featured several fictional teams and organizations and this page lists them.

== 0–9 ==
=== 3K ===
3K is a gene-terrorist organization led by the Chairman and consisting of Astra, Cassandra Nova, and Wyre. They consider themselves Krakoa's heirs and plan to bring about a new world, having mutants outnumber humans by the year 3,000. In the "Age of Revelation" storyline, the Chairman is revealed to be Beast.

=== 3K X-Men ===
The 3K X-Men (also called the Santo Marco Six) are a team formed by 3K consisting of former Orchis operatives who had their X-genes activated by 3K and were trained by Wyre. They are led by Schwarzschild (who gained black hole-generating abilities) and consist of Constellation (a S.T.R.I.K.E. agent who gained blasting abilities), Galatea (a S.H.I.E.L.D. agent who gained rock-like skin, superhuman strength, and increased durability), Juice (who gained an orange liquid body), Psychovore (who gained levitation and telepathy), and Timebomb (an A.I.M. agent and 3K X-Men's second-in-command who gained superhuman speed).

== A ==
=== A.I. Army ===
The A.I. Army is an organization established by Tony Stark, who believed himself to be an artificial intelligence and took on the name of Mark-One. The team also consists of Albert, Awesome Android, Egghead, H.E.R.B.I.E., M-11, Machine Man, Machinesmith, Quasimodo, Super-Adaptoid, Walking Stiletto, the Dreadnoughts, a Sentinel, several Nick Fury LMDs, several Constructo-Bots, and an unnamed bomb disposal robot. This group wants to obtain equal rights with organic beings through whatever way possible.

=== Acolytes ===
The Acolytes are a group of mutants and students/soldiers of the mutant Magneto, christening him a "mutant messiah." There have been several versions of Acolytes in the comics.

==== First Acolytes ====
Led originally by Fabian Cortez, his sister Annie, and consisting of Chrome, Marco Delgado, and Winters, the Acolytes first encountered Magneto on Asteroid M, a space station orbiting Earth. The Acolytes requested and were granted sanctuary in addition to kidnapping Professor X and Moira MacTaggert.

==== Second Acolytes ====
The second group of Acolytes is led by Fabian Cortez and consisted of Rusty Collins, Colossus, Exodus, Frenzy, Javitz, Katu, the Kleinstock Brothers, Seamus Mellencamp, Milan, Neophyte, Rakkus, Scanner, Senyaka, Skids, Spoor, Unuscione, and Amelia Voght.

==== Third Acolytes ====
The third incarnation of the Acolytes is led by Joseph and consisted of Decay, Gargouille, Kamal, Orator, and Projector.

==== Fourth Acolytes ====
The fourth incarnation of the Acolytes consist of Polaris, Barnacle, REM-RAM, Static, and Vindaloo.

==== Fifth Acolytes ====
The fifth incarnation of the Acolytes consisted of Exodus, Karima Shapandar, Random, Tempo, and Amelia Voght.

==== Acolytes in other media ====
- The Acolytes appear in X-Men: The Animated Series, led by Fabian Cortez and consisting of Amelia Voght, Marco Delgado, Unuscione, Chrome, Joanna Cargill, and Burner.
  - The Acolytes appear in X-Men '97, consisting of Colossus, Exodus, Delgado, Voght, Unuscione, Chrome, Cargill, Burner, Scanner, Mellencamp, Vindaloo, Spoor, Static, Tempo, Random, Senyaka, Neophyte, Skids, Rusty Collins, Kamal, Barnacle, Gargouille, Projector, Rem-Ram, Milan, and Anne-Marie Cortez.
- The Acolytes appear in X-Men: Evolution, consisting of Sabretooth, Gambit, Colossus, Pyro, and Mastermind. Additionally, Havok appears as a temporary member.
- The Acolytes appear in Wolverine and the X-Men, consisting of Mystique, Scarlet Witch, Scanner, Pyro, Blink, Juggernaut, Mercury, Seamus Mellencamp, Senyaka, and the Kleinstock brothers.
- The Acolytes appear in the X-Men: Mutant Empire novel trilogy.
- Acolytes appear as playable characters in Lego Marvel Super Heroes. This version of the group possesses members with cryokinesis, electrokinesis, and pyrokinesis.

=== Action Pack ===
Action Pack is Kentucky's sanctioned superhero team, and a part of the Fifty-State Initiative. Its known members are Vox, Prima Donna, and Frog-Man.

=== Agents of Wakanda ===
The Agents of Wakanda are the support staff of Black Panther while he was chairman of the Avengers. Known members are American Eagle, Broo, Doctor Nemesis, Fat Cobra, Gorilla-Man, Ka-Zar, Zabu, Man-Wolf, Mockingbird, Roz Solomon, Ursa Major (who was revealed to be a double agent for Russia), and Wasp.

=== America Redeemers ===
See Squadron Supreme.

=== Americops ===
The Americops are a private security force who serve the Keane Industry and use equipment stolen from Americop.

=== Anachronauts ===
The Anachronauts are a group of warriors who serve Kang the Conqueror as his personal guard. The Anachronauts were brought together by Kang, after having bested each of them in personal combat and extracting their allegiance to him. They are from various eras and alternate realities that Kang has visited in his journeys. They first appeared in Fantastic Four Annual #25 (1992). Its members are Apocryphus, Deathunt 9000, Raa, Sir Raston, Ssith, Tyndar, and Wildrun.

=== Anti-Arach9 ===
The Anti-Arach9 is a supervillain group that was formed by Octavia Vermis and consisted of Aeturnum, Brothers Grimm, Krazy Goat, Lady Bullseye, Los Espadas Gemelas De Toledo, Rose Roché, and Stegron. Each of them came together to take down their mutual enemy Spider-Woman.

=== Assassins Guild ===
The Assassins Guild is an organization that is a rival of the Thieves Guild. Bella Donna serves as the field leader and was supposed to be married to Thieves Guild member Gambit.

An unnamed telepathic child who works for the Assassins Guild dispatches Anaconda, Black Mamba, Blackout, Blizzard, Boomerang, Bullseye, Crossbones, Death Adder, Jack O'Lantern, Lady Bullseye, Puma, Sabretooth, Scalphunter, Sidewinder, Taskmaster, Tiger Shark, Whiplash, and Whirlwind to hunt Elektra and Cape Crow. Elektra defeats the villains, with the child being killed.

==== Assassins Guild in other media ====
- The Assassins Guild appears in the X-Men: The Animated Series episode "X-Ternally Yours", with Bella Donna as a prominent member.
- A group based on the Assassins Guild called the Rippers appears in the X-Men: Evolution episode "Cajun Spice", with Julius and Marion Boudreaux as prominent members.

=== Assembly of Evil ===
The Assembly of Evil is a supervillain team consisting of Jester, Fenris, Hydro-Man, Rock, and the Hulk Robot while also being infiltrated by Cloak and Dagger. This team was first seen during the "Acts of Vengeance" storyline, where it was assembled at Doctor Doom's suggestion to combat the Avengers.

=== Avatars ===
The Avatars are a group of villains who work for Mandarin. They consist of Ancestor, Butterfly, Deluge, Foundry, Lich, Old Woman, Q'Wake, Sickle, Turmoil, and Warfist.

== B ==
=== Bacchae ===
The Bacchae are a group of woman warriors. In ancient times Hippolyta and her sisters set about war mongering various lands. In each attack she would steal female children, raising them to be her faithful warriors. This gave rise to the origin of the mythological Amazons. Hippolyta served as their queen and she called them her Bacchae. This arrangement served for many years until the arrival of Hercules. Sometime later with her being immortal, Hippolyta decided to restart her Bacchae cult to advance her standing in modern day. She did this by initiating female street people and runaways, providing them with weapons and fighting skills. This modern day Bacchae also became former associates of the Golden Horde and once sought vengeance on the Invisible Woman for interfering with their affairs. They then formed a private New York club called Tartarus as a front based in the heart of Wall Street. Outsiders see it as a private pleasure palace for those of the international business elite who consider the Hellfire Club too passé. It was here during a kidnap attempt that they were foiled by the X-Men.

=== BAD Girls, Inc. ===
BAD Girls, Inc. is a group that consists of Black Mamba, Asp, and Diamondback who were close friends as well as founding members of Sidewinder's super-villain team the Serpent Society. When Diamondback began dating Steve Rogers, the team acted behind the scenes to make sure that her first real date was uneventful. After learning of Diamondback and Cap's relationship, the Society's new leader, King Cobra, had Diamondback kidnapped and placed on trial, fearing that she would reveal the groups secrets to the Captain. Diamondback was found guilty by her fellow serpents and sentenced to execution. Black Mamba and Asp objected but were overruled by King Cobra. To save Diamondback, Black Mamba and Asp called in a favor from their former leader, Sidewinder, also Black Mamba's ex-boyfriend and they rescued Diamondback, however in retaliation, King Cobra captured Asp and Black Mamba. Diamondback then hired Paladin to help her free the pair. Together, with Captain America, and Paladin, the five combined to defeat the Serpent Society.

=== Band of the Bland ===
The Band of the Bland is a group of mediocre super villains who united to assassinate Howard the Duck. It consists of Black Hole, Doctor Angst, Spanker, and Tillie the Hun.

=== Bastards of Evil ===
The Bastards of Evil are a team of young supervillains who claim to be the disavowed children of supervillains. They consist of Aftershock (who claims to be Electro's daughter), Ember (who claims to be Pyro's son), Mortar (who claims to be Grey Gargoyle's daughter), Singularity (who claims to be Graviton's son), and Warhead (who claims to be Radioactive Man's son). They came together not only to rob a bank but to come up with plans to take over the world. It is later revealed that the Bastards of Evil members were originally teenagers who were kidnapped by Superior, exposed to various forms of radiation, given personal narrative implants, and false memories as the children of supervillains.

=== Battalion ===
The Battalion is Arkansas' sanctioned superhero team and a part of the Fifty-State Initiative. Tigra is a known member of the group. Razorback was revealed to be a Skrull infiltrator.

=== Batroc's Brigade ===
Batroc's Brigade is a supervillain team assembled by Batroc the Leaper.

=== Black Air ===
Black Air is a governmental intelligence department founded and operating primarily within the United Kingdom, initially as an adjunct to the Ministry of Defence. It was introduced, along with Pete Wisdom, in Excalibur #86 (Feb. 1995), and was created by Warren Ellis. The department is tasked with the research of paranormal phenomena, replacing the Weird Happenings Organization. Notable members include Michelle Scicluna and Pete Wisdom.

=== Black Order ===
The Black Order are a group of alien warriors who serve Thanos. The group was introduced in the 2013 Infinity storyline and initially consisted of Ebony Maw, Corvus Glaive, Proxima Midnight, Black Dwarf, and Supergiant, with Black Swan later joining the group as well.

==== Television ====
- The Black Order appears in Avengers Assemble, with Proxima Midnight voiced by Kari Wahlgren, Corvus Glaive voiced by David Kaye, Ebony Maw voiced by René Auberjonois, Supergiant voiced by Hynden Walch, and Black Dwarf having no dialogue.
- The Black Order appears in Guardians of the Galaxy, with Kari Wahlgren, David Kaye, and Hynden Walch reprising their roles as Proxima Midnight, Corvus Glaive, and Supergiant respectively while Ebony Maw is voiced by James Urbaniak and Black Dwarf is voiced by Jesse Burch. In the episodes "Lyin' Eyes" and "Free Bird", Ebony Maw, Proxima Midnight, and Black Dwarf leave the group to join the Universal Believers.

==== Film ====
The Black Order, barring Supergiant and alternatively referred to as the "Children of Thanos", appear in media set in the Marvel Cinematic Universe, with Ebony Maw voiced and motion-captured by Tom Vaughan-Lawlor; Black Dwarf (renamed Cull Obsidian) voiced and motion-captured by Terry Notary; Proxima Midnight voiced and facial-captured by Carrie Coon, with motion capture primarily provided by Monique Ganderton; and Corvus Glaive voiced and motion-captured by Michael James Shaw. Introduced in Avengers: Infinity War, the Black Order make later appearances in Avengers: Endgame and What If...?. In What If...?, Coon and Vaughan-Lawlor reprise their roles as Midnight and Maw, while Glaive is voiced by Fred Tatasciore and Obsidian has no dialogue.

==== Video games ====
- The Black Order appears in Marvel Avengers Alliance.
- The Black Order appears in Marvel Contest of Champions.
- The Black Order, minus Supergiant, appears in Marvel Strike Force.
- The Black Order appears in Marvel: Future Fight.
- The Black Order appears in Lego Marvel Super Heroes 2 as part of the Avengers: Infinity War DLC.
- The Black Order appears in Marvel Ultimate Alliance 3: The Black Order, with Proxima Midnight voiced by Kari Wahlgren, Corvus Glaive voiced by David Kaye, Black Dwarf voiced by Jesse Burch, Supergiant voiced by Hynden Walch, and Ebony Maw voiced by Todd Haberkorn.
- The Black Order appears in Marvel Snap.

=== Black Spectre ===
The Black Spectre is a group established by Mandrill and consisting of his female followers, who disguise themselves as men using bulky armor. Mandrill plots to use Black Spectre to confuse America using terrorism and racism, instilling chaos in the world and intending to rule it by taking advantage of the anarchy.

=== Blood ===
The Blood are a mysterious race who allegedly supplied the first Earth-born Sorcerer Supreme over 20,000 years ago. The group also attempted to separate Johnny Blaze and Danny Ketch to prevent them from knowing they were family and utilizing their powers together, but failed. Its most notable member is Caretaker.

==== Blood in other media ====
The Blood appears in Helstrom. This version is an ancient, secretive demon-hunting organization.

=== Blood Hunters ===
The Blood Hunters are an alliance formed by Dagger, Elsa Bloodstone, Hallows' Eve, and White Widow. The group stayed together to hunt the renegade vampires which brings them into conflict with the Bloodcoven while also allying with a vampire cat named Moggy.

=== Bloodcoven ===
The Bloodcoven are a group of vampires consisting of Bloodstorm One (a clone of Dracula), Megrim (who can eat thoughts), Cruel (who projects barbed wire from his body), Unusual (who has reality-warping abilities), Damascene (a polygonal-shaped vampire who can cut through anything with his long claws and crawl up walls), and Smoke Eater (who can turn into smoke and possess anyone). During the "Blood Hunt" storyline, a Varnae-possessed Blade has the Bloodcoven sneak into the Impossible City in an attempt to take control of it.

=== Bogatyri ===
The Bogatyri is a group of Russian superhumans who intend to avenge Russia's defeat during the Cold War. They were named after the Valiant Champions of Elder Days in Russian folklore and consist of Svyatogor, Mikula Golubev, Doctor Vladimir Volkh, and Zvezda Dennista.

=== Brotherhood of the Scriers ===
The Brotherhood of the Scriers (also referred to as the Cabal of the Scriers and the Secret Order of the Scriers) is a centuries-old organization that worships the cosmic being known as Scrier. All of its members wear a mix of ghostly costumes and hooded robes.

=== Brute Force ===
Brute Force is a team consisted of eco-sensitive animals who were given the ability to speak and powered armor that gave them special powers by their benefactor Dr. Randall Pierce as part of Weapon II. They consist of a bald eagle named Soar who can transform in a fighter jet, a grizzly bear named Wreckless who can transform into a tank, a lion named Lionheart who can transform into a motorcycle, a kangaroo named Hip-Hop who can transform into an ATV, and a dolphin named Surfstreak who can transform into a race car. Together they fought injustices that were mostly eco-terrorist related such as protecting the rain forests. They primarily fought the similar team Heavy Metal consisting of the gorilla Uproar, the octopus Armory, the rhinoceros Ramrod, the shark Bloodbath, and the vulture Tailgunner.

The series, created by writer Simon Furman and penciler José Delbo, lasted four issues (Aug.-Nov. 1990).

In July 2023, Marvel released a digital revival series on Marvel Unlimited, written by comedian Paul Scheer and Nick Giovannetti, artist Geoffo, and colorist Dee Cunniffe. Scheer said, "We've always wanted to revisit these characters [since Deadpool Bi-Annual #1]. We had some plans for a limited series and even a TV show. And after the success of the documentary I did on Brute Force [for an episode of Marvel's 616 on Disney+], Marvel approached us about going a different route and instead of doing a traditional comic, to embrace this new type of digital comic."

=== Buckies ===
The Buckies/BUCkies (Bold Urban Commandos) are a group of costumed vigilantes in Captain America led costumes under Jerome Johnson/Right-Winger and Hector Lennox/Left-Winger's leadership. After the BUCkies were usurped by John Walker (under the alias of "Super Patriot") and Battlestar, the two leaders sought super-powers and were enhanced by the Power Broker. The group was disbanded after Lennox and Johnson committed suicide.

== C ==
=== Called ===
The Called is Utah's sanctioned superhero team and a part of the Fifty-State Initiative. It consists of unnamed Mormon superheroes.

=== Cavalry ===
The Cavalry is Georgia's sanctioned superhero team and a part of the Fifty-State Initiative. Known members are Stunt-Master, Crime-Buster, Red Nine, Thor Girl (revealed to be a Skrull imposter), and Ultra Girl.

=== Champions ===
There are two versions of the Champions:

=== Champions of Xandar ===
The Champions of Xandar is an organization established to safeguard the four-sectioned world of Xandar in the Andromeda Galaxy from all threats to its security. The Champions coordinated Xandar's space militia, the Nova Corps, a standing army of 500 soldiers, and its special Syfon Warrior regiment. Most of the Champions were killed fighting the forces of Nebula and the team disbanded.

=== China Force ===
China Force is a superhero team in China. Each of its members are named after the Chinese zodiac and several of them trained with the Chinese military. They consist of Rat, Ox, Rabbit, Jade Dragon, Snake, Horse, Monkey, and Dog.

=== Circus of Crime ===
The Circus of Crime is the name of several supervillain organizations. Each of its circus-themed incarnations have battled Hulk, Spider-Man, and Kid Colt. The Circus of Crime first appeared in The Incredible Hulk #3 (September 1962) and was created by Stan Lee and Jack Kirby.

==== Old West version ====
There were two organizations in the Old West who dubbed themselves the Circus of Crime. Both teams fought against Kid Colt.

The first version seen in the 19th century consisted of the strongman Sawyer, the swordsman Blade Benson, the animal trainer Captain Corbett, the tightrope walker Mr. Marvel, and the acrobats known as the Tumbling Turners.

The second version seen in the 1870s is led by former blacksmith Iron Mask. It consists of two incarnations, the first including hypnotist Bennington Brown, the ventriloquist Doctor Danger and the skilled boomerang thrower Fat Man,, and the second one featuring, next to Fatman and Doctor Danger, the extraterrestrial Living Totem, the super-fast marksman Hurricane, the acrobatic horse rider Rattler, and the winged shootist Red Raven.

==== Fritz Tiboldt's Circus of Crime ====
Originally a spy organization employed by the Nazis during World War II, Tiboldt's Circus was a traveling circus led by Fritz Tiboldt, the Ringmaster. His circus consists of the primate-like Missing Link, the snake charmer Omir, the midget Tommy Thumb, the Trapeze Trio, and the strongman Zandow. He and his performers would use their special skills and talents to rob their audiences. He was sent to America to murder US Government officials using the cover of his circus activities. Tiboldt and his gang fell afoul of Captain America and were deported back to Germany, where Tiboldt and his wife were subsequently murdered by their former employers.

==== Maynard Tiboldt's Circus of Crime ====
Fritz Tiboldt's son Maynard became the next Ringmaster and formed a version of the Circus of Crime with Clown, Princess Python, Strongman, Teena the Fat Lady, Human Cannonball, the Great Gambonnos, Live Wire, Rajah, and Fire-Eater. Other members later joined and Ringmaster even brainwashed superheroes to work for the Circus of Crime at different points.

==== Ringmistress' Circus of Crime ====
When Doctor Strange, Clea, and Bats were tasked by Umar to watch over Clea's younger sister Donna at Coney Island, an incarnation of the Circus of Crime was formed nearby. It is led by Ringmaster's daughter Ringmistress and consisting of knife-thrower Stefan Stiletto, strongman Chief Beef, and gymnast Gym-Nasty.

==== Circus of Crime in other media ====
- The Circus of Crime appears in "The Incredible Hulk" segment of The Marvel Super Heroes.
- The Circus of Crime appears in the Spider-Man episode "Carnival of Crime".
- The Circus of Crime appears in The Avengers: United They Stand episode "Comes a Swordsman", consisting of Ringmaster's unnamed henchmen.
- The Circus of Crime appears in the Avengers Assemble episode "Crime and Circuses", consisting of the Ringmaster, Strongman, the Great Gambonnos, Human Cannonball, and Trickshot. Additionally, Hawkeye and Princess Python appear as former members.
- The 19th-century incarnation of the Circus of Crime appear in Lego Marvel Super Heroes 2.

=== Comedy Kids ===
The Comedy Kids are a group of three kids consisting of Gabby, Muscles, and Junior.

=== Command ===
The Command are Florida's sanctioned superhero team and a part of the Fifty-State Initiative. Its known members are Jennifer Kale, Wundarr the Aquarian, Siege, and Conquistador.

=== Corporation ===
The Corporation is a nationwide criminal-political organization run like a business. The Corporation has employed a large number of operatives in its schemes.

The Corporation first appeared in Deadly Hands of Kung Fu #23-24 (April–May 1976), and was created by Bill Mantlo and Gil Kane. A different version of the same organization first appeared in Captain America #213-214 (September–October 1977) by Jack Kirby.

=== Council of Godheads ===
The Council of Godheads is the gathering of all the leaders of the Pantheons.

==== Council of Godheads in other media ====
The Council of Godheads appear in Thor: Love and Thunder.

=== C.R.A.D.L.E. ===
C.R.A.D.L.E. (Child-Hero Reconnaissance and Disruption Law Enforcement) is an organization that was established to stop teenage superheroes from violating the Underage Superhuman Warfare Act (Kamala's Law). Its members include Dum Dum Dugan, Speedball, and Timeslip.

=== Crazy Gang ===
The Crazy Gang is a band of low-level supervillains who appear primarily as opponents of the superhero team Excalibur. They were created by mad reality-warper Jim Jaspers, patterned after figures appearing in Lewis Carroll's Through the Looking-Glass. Their primary membership consists of Jester, the Red Queen, the Executioner, Knave and Tweedledope.

=== Creators ===
The Creators are a league of sorcerers from various time periods, some from at least as far back as the Pre-Cataclysmic era. Backed by the power of the In-Betweener, the Creators temporarily took control of the universe by transforming themselves into stars in an attempt to control the entire universe, and forcing the real stars into human forms. All was set right again by Doctor Strange and the Ancient One.

== D ==
=== Dark Riders ===
The Dark Riders is the name of several organizations.

==== Apocalypse's Dark Riders ====
The Dark Riders are a group of mutants and Inhumans that serve Apocalypse. They consist of the Inhumans Gauntlet, Foxbat, Barrage, Psynapse, and Tusk and the mutants Spyne, Lifeforce, Hurricane, Deadbolt, Genesis, and Dirtnap.

==== Krakoan Dark Riders ====
The Krakoan Dark Riders were a group of mutants brought together by Magik to assist Man-Thing against Harrower. They reunited once more to stop Nature Girl during her rampage.

The team consisted of Magik, Marrow, Shark-Girl, Forearm, Mammomax, and Wolf Cub.

=== Dark Sisterhood ===
The Dark Sisterhood is an organization made up of the superhuman descendants of the Dark Mother (Fiona Knoblach), a precognitive mutant from the time of the Salem witch trials. The organization has many affluent connections and seeks global domination. They first appeared in Cable #88 (December, 2000).

=== Darkhold Redeemers ===
The Darkhold Redeemers are a group led by Victoria Montesi and consisting of Professor Louise Hastings, her grandson Jinx, Interpol agent Sam Buchanan, and Modred the Mystic. They attempted to curtail the effects of the lost pages of the Darkhold. The Darkhold Redeemers starred in the series Darkhold: Pages from the Book of Sins. Many pages of the Darkhold were being passed around by a demonic dwarf. The recipients of the page could use them to grant a wish at the cost of their soul and the wish tends to go horrifically wrong.

=== Daughters of Liberty ===
The Daughters of Liberty are an all-female group that are determined to protect the freedom of everyone at all costs. Harriet Tubman was the leader of one incarnation under the name of Dryad. In the present, Peggy Carter has taken on the Dryad name and the present-day Daughters of Liberty consist of Agatha Harkness, Black Widow, Invisible Woman, Mockingbird, Sharon Carter, Spider-Woman, Shuri, and White Tiger.

=== Dawn of the White Light ===
The Dawn of the White Light is a Japan-based mutant death-cult led by Gorgon. The cult forms an alliance with the Hand and Hydra and together they turn superhumans to brainwashed assassins. The brainwashed X-Man Northstar then becomes the leader of the Dawn of the White Light and they go on a killing spree in America. Wolverine and a group of Sentinels destroy the cult.

=== Deadpool Corps ===
The Deadpool Corps is an alliance of alternate universe versions of Deadpool. Lady Deadpool and Headpool return from their previous appearances in Deadpool: Merc with a Mouth, joined by newcomers Kidpool, a child version of Deadpool who attends Professor X's school, and Dogpool, a dog who possesses Deadpool's healing factor. They are later joined by Champion of the Universe (going by the name of "Championpool"), and a squirrel called Squirrelpool who comes from Earth-41627. The group was brought together by the Elder of the Universe known as the Contemplator. He brought them together to stop the powerful cosmic being known as the Awareness. The Awareness absorbed entire worlds, devouring the people's consciousnesses. They gained other members like Beard of Beespool of Earth-616, Fool of Earth-11542 (Watari), the Golden Age Deadpool of Earth-67484 (Frederick Wilson), Pandapool of Earth-51315, and various other versions of Deadpool.

==== Deadpool Corps in other media ====
- The Deadpool Corps appear in Deadpool & Wolverine, consisting of Ladypool (portrayed by Christiaan Bettridge and voiced by Blake Lively), Cowboypool (voiced by Matthew McConaughey), Headpool (portrayed by Geoff Redknap and voiced by Nathan Fillion), Kidpool (portrayed by Inez Reynolds), Babypool (portrayed by Olin Reynolds), Welshpool (portrayed by Paul Mullin), Canadapool (portrayed by Alex Kyshkovych), Haroldpool (portrayed by an uncredited Harry Holland), Zenpool (portrayed by an uncredited Kevin Fortin), Roninpool (portrayed by an uncredited Hung Dante Dong), Deadpool 2099 (portrayed by an uncredited Ailís Smith), Golden Age Deadpool (portrayed by an uncredited Martin Wilde), Piratepool, Scottishpool, Shortpool, Kingpool, Cupidpool, Greatest Showman Deadpool, Jesterpool, Detectivepool, a hooded Deadpool, and a Deadpool with white parts on his suit.
- The Deadpool Corps appear in Marvel Tokon: Fighting Souls as a part of Deadpool's Ultimate Skill.

=== Death Commandos ===
The Shi'ar Death Commandos are a black-ops team operating under the Shi'ar, out of the public eye. They were involved in eliminating the Grey Genome, killing all members of Jean Grey's family, except for Rachel Grey and Cable.

When Xandra Neramani, daughter of Lilandra and Charles Xavier, was training to take the Shi'ar throne, she asked to see her aunt, Deathbird. Oracle of the Imperial Guard, saw Deathbird as a threat, and sent the Death Commandos to kill Deathbird and her escort, the New Mutants. Many members of the Commandos were killed.

Code Name	Powers, abilities, and equipment	First appearance	Notes
Black Cloak	Superhuman strength. Energy spear and teleportation cloak	The Uncanny X-Men #467 (December 2005)	Killed by Rachel Grey in War of Kings #5 (July 2009)
Black Cloak	Superhuman strength. Energy spear and teleportation cloak	New Mutants vol.4 #5 (Jan. 2020)	Killed by Deathbird in New Mutants (vol. 4) #7 (February 2020)
Colony	Living hive of insects	The Uncanny X-Men #467 (December 2005)	
D'Evo	Creates forcefield to disintegrate and devour victims	The Uncanny X-Men #467 (December 2005)	Died in space in New Mutants (vol. 4) #5 (January 2020)
Flaw	Shapeshifter, cybernetic enhancements give super strength and power replication	The Uncanny X-Men #467 (December 2005)	Killed by Magik in New Mutants (vol. 4) #5 (January 2020)
Hypernova	Plasma generation from hands	The Uncanny X-Men #467 (December 2005)	Killed by Magik in New Mutants (vol. 4) #5 (January 2020)
Krait	Cybernetic enhancements allow flight and superhuman strength	The Uncanny X-Men #467 (December 2005)	Shi'ar. Died in space in New Mutants (vol. 4) #5 (Jan. 2020)
Offset	Insect physiology (four arms, fangs). Wields swords	The Uncanny X-Men #467 (December 2005)	Killed by Magik in New Mutants (vol. 4) #5 (January 2020)
Sega	Gaseous body	The Uncanny X-Men #467 (December 2005)	
Shell	Body composed of rocks, can be used as projectiles and entrap victims inside himself	The Uncanny X-Men #467 (December 2005)	Orthoxalith. Died in space in New Mutants (vol. 4) #5 (January 2020)
Warshot	Excellent marksman. Laser rifle	The Uncanny X-Men #467 (December 2005)	Kree. Killed by Deathbird in New Mutants (vol. 4) #7 (February 2020)
New Roster
Black Cloak	Twin blades	Imperial War: Exiles #1 (September, 2025)	Leader
Farstar	Wings and scythe	Imperial War: Exiles #1 (September, 2025)	
Pale Sun		Imperial War: Exiles #1 (September, 2025)	
Supercluster		Imperial War: Exiles #1 (September, 2025)	
Titanfall		Imperial War: Exiles #1 (September, 2025)	
Warp Rider	Rifle	Imperial War: Exiles #1 (September, 2025)	

=== Death Sponsors ===
The Death Sponsors are a group of merecenaries operating in the Mojoverse. They have worked for the Grandmaster and were tasked with capturing Arize, which lead them into conflict with the X-Men. They were later all killed by Shatterstar, except Timeslot who was killed by Night Thrasher. The members of the Death Sponsors were Cancellator, Deadair, Lead-In, Sweepzweak, and Timeslot.

=== Death Squad ===
The Death Squad are an organization hired by a mysterious employer who wants Iron Man dead. They manage to track Iron Man down at his main office, and a battle began. Though they gave Iron Man a good run for his money, they were not able to defeat the super-hero. Iron Man is about to defeat the entire group, but they manage an escape. Iron Man is unable to give pursuit, as the Death Squad had damaged his armor's boot jets. Later, the Death Squad decide to give the murder attempt another try. They assist their employer (Justin Hammer) in the murder of several ionically powered beings and in the graverobbing of several of Iron Man's old acquaintances. S.H.I.E.L.D. leader Nick Fury informs Iron Man about this and he investigates the matter, with the trail eventually leading toward the Death Squad, who were hiding out at the old castle of the ionically powered long-time Avengers foe Count Nefaria. Nefaria is revealed to be their employer. Iron Man manages to defeat Nefaria and his other minion, Nitro. In the heat of battle, the Death Squad again manages to escape.

=== Death-Throws ===
Death-Throws
- (From left to right) Bombshell, Ringleader, Knickknack, Oddball and Tenpin in Captain America #317 (May 1986). Art by Paul Neary

Publication information
- Publisher: Marvel Comics
- First appearance: Captain America #317 (May 1986)
- Created by: Mark Gruenwald; Paul Neary

In-story information
- Base(s): New York
- Member(s): Bombshell; Knickknack; Oddball (Orville Bock); Oddball (Elton Healey); Ringleader; Tenpin

The Death-Throws are a team of supervillains that first appeared in Captain America #317 (May 1986) and were created by Mark Gruenwald and Paul Neary. Introduced as enemies of Hawkeye, the Death-Throws consists primarily of jugglers who each use various juggling props as weapons.

The Ringleader and the Healey brothers (Oddball and Tenpin) came together to form the juggling-themed supervillain group, the Death-Throws. Knickknack was later recruited as the fourth member of the group. Oddball, given to his eccentric behaviour, quit the Death-Throws and branched out on his own. Oddball was hired, along with Bombshell, by Crossfire to battle Hawkeye and Mockingbird. The two supervillains subdued the heroes and delivered them to Crossfire. Later, when Hawkeye had managed to escape, Bombshell, Oddball and Crossfire were defeated and handed over to the authorities. Bombshell and Oddball were broken out of prison by Oddball's brother, Tenpin, and became members of the Death-Throws.

==== Death-T.H.R.O.W.S. ====
Death T.H.R.O.W.S. is a group of foot soldiers employed by Crossfire. However, deciding to leave behind the "fifth rate hacks in ridiculous costumes", Crossfire created a new army for himself. His "Death T.H.R.O.W.S". (Techno Hybrid Remotely Operated Weapons Systems) are robotic constructs that obey only his commands and each carry a small capable arsenal concealed within their armored shells.

==== Death-Throws in other media ====
- A character based on Tenpin named John Healy appears in Daredevil, portrayed by Alex Morf.
- Tenpin appears in M.O.D.O.K., voiced by Chris Parnell.

=== Death Web ===
Death Web is an organization whose members were granted super powers by the Commission on Superhuman Activities with the intent that they use their powers to serve the government. The team's individual members each obtained superpowers through the scientific manipulation of chemicals extracted from exotic plants from the Amazon jungle.

=== Deep Six ===
The Deep Six is the name of two organizations.

==== Namor's Deep Six ====
When Namor the Sub-Mariner was missing and framed for crimes in the surface world, several of his Atlantean allies set out to find him together as the first Deep Six. The impromptu group consisted of Stingray, Andromeda, Tiger Shark, Tamara Rahn, and Triton. They battled against the Avengers and then broke up shortly thereafter.

==== Attuma's Deep Six ====
Alternatively, Attuma's incarnation of the Deep Six appeared in The Defenders (vol. 2) #7 (September 2001). Membership of the group included Attuma, Nagala, Orka, Piranha, Sea Urchin, and Tiger Shark.

=== Defenders of the Deep ===
Defenders of the Deep is an organization established by Namor to protect the oceans. It consists of Tiger Shark, Orka, Andromeda, Echidna, the Piranhas, Fathom Five members Bloodtide and Manowar, and King Crab.

=== Desert Stars ===
The Desert Stars are Arizona's sanctioned superhero team that are part of the Fifty-State Initiative. It consists of Two-Gun Kid, Komodo, Johnny Cool, and Supermax. Blacksmith was revealed to be a Skrull infiltrator.

=== Desert Sword ===
Desert Sword is Iraq's personal superhuman military team, led by Sirocco. The original team's roster included Sirocco, Aminedi, the Veil, and Black Raazer until Iraq forced Arabian Knight onto the team.

=== Dominus' Minions ===
Dominus' Minions are a team employed by Dominus to help him conquer Earth. One of them was Sunstroke, a human being. The others were sentient beings created from lizards ("Gila"), cacti ("Cactus"), and rocks ("Butte") by means of the robot's alien technology. Dominus was able to create duplicates of each of the three artificially created beings.

== E ==
=== Earth Force ===
Earth Force was formed from a group of hospitalized people who were transformed by Seth. It consists of Earth Lord (created from a police officer who was hospitalized after being shot by criminals), Skyhawk (created from a businessman who was hospitalized from overwork), and Wind Warrior (created from a housewife who was hospitalized following a suicide attempt).

=== Elder Gods ===
The Elder Gods are the oldest of Earth's deities, namely Set, Chthon, Gaea and Oshtur. Later, the Gibborim, Tiwaz, Utgard-Loki, and Toranos in Immortal Thor were added to their number.

=== Elementals of Doom ===
The Elementals of Doom are personifications of Air, Water, Earth and Fire and referred to as such. They were created by Diablo through the use of the Tailsmans of Power to battle the Fantastic Four. He later created a fifth member called the Trans-Mutant who had the ability to transform the composition of one object to another. Diablo later combined all four Elementals into the Elematrix.

=== Elements of Doom ===
The Elements of Doom are a group consisting of numerous humanoid beings composed of the periodic table. They were created by aliens to battle the Avengers, but were all defeated. They were then recruited by Diablo after his Elementals of Doom were destroyed.

=== Enclave ===
Enclave is the name of several organizations.

==== First Enclave ====
The first Enclave was founded by scientists Jerome Hamilton, Maris Morlak, Wladyslav Shinski, and Carlo Zota. The organization's goal was to use advanced technology to establish a benevolent world dictatorship under the rule of the scientists. The four scientists successfully faked their deaths and disappeared from society, using their technology and abandoned Deviant technology they had found. The scientists' first significant accomplishment was the creation of the superhumanly powerful humanoid being they referred to as "Him" in an attempt to "create a perfect race of human beings "without evil - without sin." After entering a cocoon and undergoing metamorphosis, Him emerges, killing Jerome Hamilton and destroying the Citadel. The surviving scientists create another superhumanly powerful humanoid they call "Paragon" (Her/Kismet). Her escapes the scientists' custody and destroys their rebuilt citadel.

==== Asmodeus-worshipping Enclave ====
Another unrelated Enclave in Marvel Comics first appeared in The Tomb of Dracula (vol. 2) #2 in Dec. 1979. The group consisted of Damian Burnemissza, Druig, Satas, Kirk Druker, and Sondra. This Enclave was an organization of occultists dedicated to the worship of the demon Asmodeus. They were enemies of the Dimensional Man and Dracula. This group was created by Marv Wolfman and Steve Ditko.

==== Sewer-dwelling Enclave ====
Shift created an Enclave consisting of sewer dwellers who would be prosecuted on the surface. They consist of Curt Connors, Billy Connors, Martha Connors, Miguel Fuentes, Grace Jonas, Lee Jonas, Vermin, and the Jacks (clones of Jackal).

==== Enclave in other media ====
- The Enclave appears in Moon Girl and Devil Dinosaur, led by Maris Morlak. Additionally, Moon Girl's grandmother Miriam "Mimi" Lafayette appears as a former member. Years prior, Morlak and Mimi attempted to steal research they had conducted on inter-dimensional travel. After their superiors betrayed them, only to be killed by an otherworldly creature, Morlak took over the Enclave while Mimi fled and started a family.
- The Enclave appears in The Incredible Hulk. This version of the organization is led by four mysterious unnamed scientists in armored suits who each lead a separate branch. "Ceres Leader" is the head of genetics and chemical weapons, "Jupiter Leader" is the head of weather manipulation, "Minerva Leader" is the head of the mind control and psych-ops branch, and "Vulcan Leader" is the head of mechanical design. They have total disregard for human life, testing their devices on the citizens of Manhattan, launching many schemes of conquest, and would eliminate all obstacles that stand in their way.

=== Evil Deadpool Corps ===
The Evil Deadpool Corps is a counterpart of the Deadpool Corps that consist of evil alternate universe version of Deadpool. It is led by Dreadpool of Earth-12101 and consists of Assassin Deadpool of Earth-13134, Beard of Beespool of Earth-616 (who was revealed to be a spy for the Deadpool Corps), Cesspool, Galactipool, D.E.A.D.P.O.O.L. (a MODOK version of Deadpool), Dead Man Wade of Earth-295, Deadpool of Earth-1610, Deadpool Kid of Earth-1108, Deadpool the Duck of Earth-791021, Deadpool Dinosaur (a Deadpool/Devil Dinosaur hybrid), Evil Deadpool of Earth-616, Iron Man of Earth-97116, Spiralpool, Swordsman of "Heroes Reborn", Venompool of Earth-90211, War, Wolverinepool, and an assortment of unidentified evil Deadpools.

=== Exemplars ===
The Exemplars are a group of eight humans granted superhuman powers by the Octessence, in a bid to see which member of the Octessence is the most powerful among them. The humans were empowered by physical manifestations of the beings within the Octessence, and their minds were warped in the process. The Exemplars are typically as malevolent as the respective beings which empower them.

The team initially tried to create a "God Machine" to control the minds of humanity, but were thwarted. They next attempted to execute the member Juggernaut for defecting, fighting the Avengers. Captain America convinved Bedlam to use her powers to undo the control of the Octessence on the other members, causing the team to disband.

==== Members ====
- Bedlam (Olisa Kabaki): An eight-year-old girl from Kenya empowered by the Ivory Idol of Ikonn, she possesses powerful telepathic and telekinetic abilities, including the ability to fire off debilitating mental bolts.
- Carnivore (Andreas Zorba): A Greek Count empowered by the Fearsome Fist of Farallah, he possesses superhuman physical abilities, enhanced senses, and powerful claws. He was killed by the Black Knight.
- Conquest (Bridget Malone): A woman from Belfast, Northern Ireland during the Troubles, with suspected links to the IRA. She went on the run when she was suspected of being involved in a shootout with the police. Empowered by the Kestrel Key of Krakkan, Conquest possesses enhanced fighting skills and a wide assortment of weaponry attached to her costume, also demonstrating enhanced agility and the ability to fire powerful bolts of energy from the Kestrel Key.
- Decay (Yoshiro Hachiman): A Japanese business efficiency expert, empowered by the Verdant Vial of Valtorr, he possesses a "touch of death" that caused both organic and inorganic objects to disintegrate.
- Inferno (Samantha McGee): An American pilot from Tennessee that resigned and moved to Nunavut, Canada to set up her own company, McGee Charter Service. She was empowered by the Blinding Brazier of Balthakk, she possesses the ability to fly and generate intense heat and flames, generally focused on powerful bolts of energy strong enough to vaporize steel.
- Juggernaut (Cain Marko): Stepbrother of Professor X and long-time foe of the X-Men. Empowered by the Crimson Crystal of Cyttorak, he possesses superhuman strength and invulnerability, becoming unstoppable once in motion.
- Stonecutter (Utama Somchart): An itinerant worker from Thailand. He was a dreamer and graffiti artist who lacked professional skills and the talent to be the artist he wanted to be. He is empowered by the Ringed Ruby of Raggadorr, possessing enhanced strength and combat skills, as well as the ability to design and build machines rapidly.
- Tempest (Nicolette Giroux): A French woman and an international game warden who was known to take her job too far. Empowered by the Wondrous Waterfall of Watoomb, she possesses the ability to manipulate nature, which enables her to manipulate plant life, the earth, weather, and the wind, as well as transform into living fog.

=== Eyekillers ===
The Eyekillers first appeared in Doctor Strange #38 (December 1979), and were created by Chris Claremont and Gene Colan. The Eyekillers subsequently appear in Uncanny X-Men #222 (October 1987).

The Eyekillers were demons of Native American legend. They had owls' heads, snakes' bodies, and mountain lions' forelegs. They can appear to be humans, and can drain the life forces of humans and project destructive mystic bolts.

Eyekillers have fought Doctor Strange, and Storm and the Adversary (posing as Nazé).

== F ==
=== Factor Three ===
Factor Three is a short-lived organization led by the Mutant Master, who was secretly an octopus-like alien. It used various mind control methods to capture and train new agents, though some merely joined for profit. Members of Factor Three include Banshee, Blob, Changeling, Mastermind, Ogre, Unus the Untouchable, and Vanisher.

Changeling, Mutant Master's second in command, discovers his plans to destroy mutantkind as well as humankind. The X-Men and Factor Three join forces in attacking Mutant Master, who commits suicide to avoid capture. With Mutant Master dead, Factor Three disbands.

=== Fangs ===
The Fangs are a group that was created to assist Viper in her goals. Its members are Bludgeon, Heat-Ray, Razorblade, and Slither.

=== Fast Five ===
Fast Five is an organization founded by Blue Streak whose members sport similar suits to him. Its members consist of Gold Rush, Green Light, Redline, and Silver Ghost.

Following "The War of the Realms" storyline, the Fast Five attempt to steal Asgardian weaponry and encounter Jane Foster. When Gold Rush tries to steal Foster's sword Dragonfang, he is killed by Bullseye, who takes Dragonfang.

=== Fathom Five ===
The Fathom Five is an Atlantean splintered military group with goals to decimate the surface world and were formed by a strike force called the "Fury of the Sea". It consists of Bloodtide, Dragonrider, Llyron, Manowar, and Sea Leopard.

=== Fear Lords ===
The Fear Lords are an organization consisting of seven demons consisting of D'Spayre, Dweller-in-Darkness, Kkallakku, Lurking Unknown, Nightmare, Nox, and Straw Man who conspired to conquer and rule the Earth through fear. They were opposed by Daredevil and Doctor Strange, and Straw Man (who betrayed them).

=== First Line ===
First Line is an organization that first appeared in Marvel: The Lost Generation—essentially a retcon to fill the gaps caused by Marvel's "sliding timescale", in which the emergence of major superheroes and events was only supposed to have occurred "about ten or fifteen years ago".

The team's roster changes considerably over the decades, two constant members being a wealthy urban warrior called Black Fox and a female Eternal who goes by the code name Pixie.

=== Flashmob ===
Flashmob is an organization of street criminals that were originally formed to attack Power Man. It consists of Nightshade, Chemistro, Cheshire Cat, Comanche, Cockroach Hamilton, Mr. Fish, and Spear.

=== Force of Nature ===
Force of Nature is an eco-terrorist group that work for the organization Project Earth. Known members are Aqueduct, Firebrand, Firewall, Skybreaker, Sunstreak, and Terraformer.

=== Four Winds ===
The Four Winds is a global crime syndicate with 20,000 members who have battled Deadpool.

=== Freedom's Five ===
Freedom's Five is a World War I team featuring Union Jack, Phantom Eagle, Sir Steel, Silver Squire and Crimson Cavalier.

=== Friends of Humanity ===
The Friends of Humanity (FoH) is an anti-mutant hate group founded by Graydon Creed. Known members include Bastion, Checks, Grinder, Hanratty, Jumbo, and W. C. Taylor.

==== Friends of Humanity in other media ====
- The Friends of Humanity appear in X-Men: The Animated Series, initially led by Graydon Creed before a ruling council take over.
  - The Friends of Humanity appear in X-Men '97, led by X-Cutioner.

== G ==
=== Garrison ===
The Garrison is Vermont's sanctioned superhero team and a part of the Fifty-State Initiative. Its known members are Fin and Man-Eater.

=== Genetix ===
Genetix is an organization appearing in American comic books published by Marvel Comics. They were created by Andy Lanning, Graham Marks, and Phil Gascoine and first appeared in Codename Genetix #1 (January 1993), followed by another limited series called Genetix (October 1993).

Dr. Oonagh Mullarkey forcibly recruited Genetix into the genetic experiments for Gena-Sys, the genetic research division of Mys-Tech. During the mutation process, their original brain patterns and memories were buried under false memory implants of artificial backgrounds. In addition, their powers have been augmented by their bio-armor, created from proto-silicon implants (derived from the Digitek project), which have also bonded to their DNA strands. Mullarkey fitted each member with restrainer monitoring harnesses to give them greater control of their developing powers. The group members also developed a symbiotic link that allowed them to operate at enhanced efficiency when they were close to each other.

=== Ghosts of Cyclops ===
The Ghosts of Cyclops are young misguided college-age mutant extremists who attack Chicago as part of the legacy of the deceased Cyclops and wear the same visors as him. They are led by Thirst (who possesses strong water-spewing abilities) and consist of Juice (who possesses electrokinesis and flight), Pillar (who can turn into a gray-skinned Hulk-like form), Sebastian (who can turn into a humanoid crustacean and generate fire), Tarpit (who can generate a tar-like substance), and an unnamed member.

=== G.I.R.L. ===
G.I.R.L. is an all-female team of teenage superhero created by writer Jeremy Whitley and Elsa Charretier, first appeared in Unstoppable Wasp #2 (April 2017).

=== Goblin Nation ===
The Goblin Nation, also known as the Goblin Underground, is a group of organized crime composed of Goblin-themed villains led by Norman Osborn operating as the Goblin King against the Superior Spider-Man.

==== Goblin Nation in other media ====
The Goblin Nation appears in the Spider-Man multi-part episode "Goblin War". This incarnation consists of various Goblin clans led by Silvermane, Electro, Crossbones, and the Wake Riders, with Adrian Toomes operating as the Goblin King.

=== Godzilla Squad ===
The Godzilla Squad was formed to study Godzilla, ideally by capturing him, and preventing injury both to and by him. It was funded and partially controlled by S.H.I.E.L.D., with technology—such as the Red Ronin mecha—constructed by Stark International. S.H.I.E.L.D. agents attached to the Godzilla Squad included Dum Dum Dugan, Jimmy Woo, and Gabe Jones. The group was occasionally aided by the Avengers (particularly Henry Pym), the Fantastic Four (particularly Reed Richards), and Spider-Man. The organization was frequently opposed by Doctor Demonicus.

=== Great Beasts ===
The Great Beasts are a group of supernatural origin, originally created as antagonists for Alpha Flight. They consist of Kariooq, Kolomaq, Neooqtoq, Ranaq, Somon, Tanaraq, Tolomaq, and Tundra. Neooqtoq is described as the "deadliest" of the Great Beasts.

=== Green Springs ===
Green Springs is a company established by Abomination with the purpose of creating gamma mutates, with Aliana Alba as an employee. Abomination had Green Springs repower Hulk's son Skaar.

== H ==
=== Haazareth Three ===
The Haazareth Three are a trio of demons that operate out of the hellish realm ruled by Mephisto.

=== H.A.M.M.E.R. ===
H.A.M.M.E.R. logo

H.A.M.M.E.R. is an espionage and law enforcement agency that was founded and led by Norman Osborn to replace S.H.I.E.L.D. The organisation plays a large part in the "Dark Reign" and Siege storylines that ran from 2008 to 2010. Under Osborn's leadership, H.A.M.M.E.R. gains administrative control over the Fifty State Initiative.

During the siege of Asgard, Osborn sends H.A.M.M.E.R., the Dark Avengers, and the Initiative members on his side to attack Asgard. In response, the President dispatches military forces to Broxton, Oklahoma and has Osborn and the Dark Avengers arrested for treason. H.A.M.M.E.R. is soon officially dissolved.

=== Harriers ===
The Harriers are a team of mercenary soldiers, trained and equipped to battle both conventional and superhuman opponents. The organization consists of a military-style unit headed by the commanding officer, Hardcase, and nine other members. Each of the Harriers formerly served as an agent of S.H.I.E.L.D. When the original version of S.H.I.E.L.D. was disbanded, these ten former S.H.I.E.L.D. banded together as the Harriers.

=== Harvesters ===
The Harvesters are Kansas' sanctioned superhero team and a part of the Fifty-State Initiative. Its known members are Pioneer, Grain Belt, Topeka, Meadowlark, and Sunflower.

=== Hatut Zeraze ===
The Hatut Zeraze (translated as Dogs of War; also called the War Dogs and Wakandan Security Force) is Wakanda's secret police. When T'Chaka was killed by Klaw, the Hatut Zeraze were dispatched to find the culprits responsible.

==== Hatut Zeraze in other media ====
- The War Dogs appear in projects set in the Marvel Cinematic Universe.
  - The War Dogs appear in Black Panther, with Zuri and Nakia as prominent members.
  - The War Dogs appear in Eyes of Wakanda.

=== Heat ===
The Heat is a private military company based in Hell's Kitchen, Manhattan. In the storyline "Gang War", Rafael Scarfe is revealed to be the leader of the Heat.

A faction of the Heat was later established in Chicago, led by Lucia von Bardas.

=== Heavy Hitters ===
The Heavy Hitters are Nevada's sanctioned superhero team and part of the Fifty-State Initiative. Known members are Gravity, Hardball, Nonstop, Prodigy, and Telemetry.

=== Heavy Metal ===
Heavy Metal is the name of two organizations.

==== Heavy Metal (Androids) ====
Heavy Metal is a group of androids consisting of Super-Adaptoid, Machine Man, Awesome Android, Sentry-459, and TESS-One.

==== Heavy Metal (Brute Force villains) ====
Heavy Metal is a group of cybernetic animals that were created by Multicorp to fight the Brute Force. It consists of a gorilla named Uproar, a rhinoceros named Ramrod, a shark named Bloodbath, a vulture named Tailgunner, and an octopus named Armory.

=== Heavy Mettle ===
Heavy Mettle is a supervillain group that was founded by Joseph Manfredi.

=== Hell-lords ===
The Hell-lords are the lords of the kingdoms of Hell. Hell is broken into several smaller kingdoms ruled over by demonic entities who are generally at odds with each other. Most of these entities are devils and those considered powerful enough to be the strongest rulers in Hell are referred as the Hell-lords.

=== Hell's Belles ===
Hell's Belles is a team composed of female mutant terrorists. They were formed by Cyber to commit acts of extortion, and worked for a notorious drug cartel. The team consisted of Briquette, Flambé, Shrew, Tremolo, and Vague.

=== Hood's Gang ===
Hood's Gang is a large alliance of supervillains established by Hood, who states that its members will be paid in seed money. The Hood's cousin John King serves as his lieutenant.

==== Hood's Gang in other media ====
A version of Hood's Gang appears in Ironheart. This version consists of Hood, John King, siblings Jeri Blood and Roz Blood, pyrotechnics specialist Clown, tech specialist Rampage, and hacker Slug.

=== Hordeculture ===
Hordeculture is a group of agrochemists, biotechnologists, and bioengineers consisting of Augusta Bromes, Lily Leymus, Edith Scutch, and Opal Vetiver. Specializing in the genetic manipulation and propaganda of plant life, they plan to depopulate the human race so that they can return Earth to what they consider a "more pristine state".

=== Hulk Gang ===
The Hulk Gang is the name of two organizations in the "Old Man Logan" universe, both consisting of Bruce Banner's hillbilly grandchildren.

==== Hulk Gang (Earth-807128 version) ====
Hulk Gang members Bobbie-Jo Banner, Charlie Banner, and Otis Banner beat up Logan and would inflict more pain on him if he did not pay double by next month. As Logan was with Hawkeye to obtain the money, the Hulk Gang got tired of waiting and killed Logan's family. Upon returning and finding his family dead, Logan was informed of what happened by his neighbor Abraham Donovan causing Logan to bring out his claws for the first time. Logan proceeded to hunt down and kill the Hulk Gang members Beau, Bobbie-Jo, Charlie, Elrod, Eustace, Luke, Otis, and Rufus where he killed them. When he made his way to Pappy Banner who admitted that he got tired of being a supervillain landlord and wanted to fight Logan for old time sake by having his family killed, Logan engaged him in his Hulk form in battle and emerged as the victor. He spared Billy-Bob and took custody of Hulk's infant son Bruce Jr.

==== Hulk Gang (Earth-21293 version) ====
The Hulk Gang's history was the same here. Sometime after Pappy Banner's death and the deaths of Beau Banner, Bobbie-Jo Banner, Charlie Banner, Elrod Banner, Eustace Banner, Luke Banner, Otis Banner, and Rufus Banner, the remaining Hulk Gang members Beau Banner II, Billy-Bob Banner, Bobbie Sue Banner, Bodean Banner, Buck Banner, Cambria Banner, Clystine Banner, Horace Banner, Jackson Banner, Jefferson Banner, Jewel Banner, Jozelle Banner, Malakai Banner, Merle Banner, and Virgil Banner are gathered by an unidentified version of Maestro who plans to make a paradise for the Hulk Gang on Earth-616. With help from the Cambria Banner who defected to their side, Logan and Hawkeye of Earth-616 are able to defeat Maestro and the surviving members of the Hulk Gang go their separate ways.

=== Hydro-Men ===
The Hydro-Men are an organization led by fanatical scientist Herman Frayne who used mutagenic Terrigen Mist to transform himself into a green, scaly-skinned humanoid that can breathe underwater. He took the name of Doctor Hydro. He also transformed his hired agents into Hydro-Men as well.

== I ==
=== Inner Demons ===
The Inner Demons are the henchmen of Mister Negative. They wear Chinese opera masks and use high tech electrified versions of swords, knuckles and various other Asian weaponry such as gun staffs and nunchakus. The Inner Demons can regenerate from lethal wounds within a matter of seconds, as they have been shown almost immediately recovering from impalement, gunshots to the head, and even being torn apart or decapitated.

==== Inner Demons in other media ====
The Inner Demons appear in Spider-Man (2018).

=== Institute of Evil ===
The Institute of Evil is an organization from Earth-712 who are the Squadron Supreme's arch-foes. The known members of the Institute of Evil include Ape-X (leader), Doctor Decibel, Foxfire, Lamprey, Quagmire, and Shape.

The Institute of Evil's members are subjected to Squadron member Tom Thumb's Behavior Modification process, altering their personalities. The former super-criminals all became elected to full membership in the Squadron Supreme and aided them in their efforts to conquer the world and forcibly turn it into a utopia.

Squadron Supreme member Nighthawk objects to the extreme methods the Squadron was using to achieve its goals and leaves the group. With the help of Master Menace, Nighthawk and his group, the American Redeemers, reverse the behavior modification of Foxfire, Lamprey, and Shape and recruit them into his group. The three remain in the Squadron as double agents.

When the Redeemers finally confront the Squadron Supreme, an all-out battle breaks out, during which Lamprey, Nighthawk, and Foxfire are killed. The death of Nighthawk causes the Squadron members to realize that they had become the very thing that they had intended to oppose, and thus end the fight. Shape remains with the Squadron Supreme, finding happiness in his new calling.

=== Intelligencia ===
Intelligencia is a group that consists of the greatest criminal minds on Earth. Its known members are Leader, MODOK, Mad Thinker, Red Ghost, and Wizard, with Doctor Doom and Egghead being former members. The Intelligencia were responsible for transforming Thunderbolt Ross and Rick Jones into the gamma mutates Red Hulk and A-Bomb.

The New Intelligencia is an incarnation of Intelligencia consisting of MODOK Superior, Leader, Mad Thinker, Awesome Android, and Mister Sinister.

==== Intelligencia in other media ====
The Intelligencia appears in She-Hulk: Attorney at Law. This version of the group is run by Todd Phelps / "HulkKing" and serves as an online hate group bent on obtaining a sample of She-Hulk's blood to become Hulks themselves and ruining her reputation.

=== Intruders ===
The Intruders are an elite offshoot of the Wild Pack.

=== Inventors ===
The Inventors are an alliance of the Inventor and his fellow creations, all avian clones of inventors and thinkers. They consist of a marabou stork clone of Leonardo da Vinci, an Atlantic puffin clone of Philo Farnsworth, a toucan clone of Nikola Tesla, and a pheasant clone of Marie Curie. Inventor leads the Inventors in fighting Ms. Marvel, who drives off all of them but the Inventor.

== J ==
=== Jack O'Lanterns ===
The Jack O'Lanterns are a group of mercenaries led by the Steven Mark Levins version of Jack O'Lantern who wear the same costumes and wield the same equipment of Jack O'Lantern. They fought Spider-Man and Teresa Parker when they tried to capture Chameleon.

== L ==
=== Landau, Luckman, and Lake ===
Landau, Luckman, and Lake is an interdimensional firm that operates across multiple realities and timelines, employing agents throughout the multiverse. The company manages assets for dimension-traveling clients and exerts influence over events to ensure the survival of key heroes capable of preventing apocalyptic outcomes. Its personnel are strategically positioned in various locations and eras where their presence is believed to have the greatest impact. Chris Claremont named the company after the original owners of the Forbidden Planet comic store: Nick Landau, Mike Luckman, and Mike Lake.

=== League of Losers ===
The League of Losers are a superhero from Earth-6215 that opposes the time-traveling Chronok. They consist of that world's version of Dagger, Darkhawk, Gravity, Speedball, Sleepwalker, Terror, and X-23.

=== Legion Accursed ===
The Legion Accursed is an organization consisting of 99 supervillains who were recruited by Mephisto in his plot to steal the Beyonder's powers. The Legion Accursed was enchanted to send his powers into Mephisto's device called the Beyondersbane when they touched him. Upon seeing Beyonder about to leave the Pacific island he was living on, Mephisto has Thing sign a contract to make him stronger by the time the Legion Accursed was awakened. When the Legion Accursed attacked, Thing fought defeated most of them and even held back Juggernaut. This fight caused the Beyondersbane to malfunction. As a result, Mephisto ended his plot and sent the villains back to where he got them from.

=== Life Foundation ===
The Life Foundation is a survivalist group that is primarily an enemy of enemy of Spider-Man and Venom. The Life Foundation was founded in response to Cold War paranoia, and is dedicated to constructing doomsday-proof communities for both its own members and society's elite who can reserve a spot in these facilities for a minimum payment of $5,000,000.

==== Life Foundation in other media ====
The Life Foundation appears in Venom (2018). This version is a genetic corporation founded by Carlton Drake.

=== Lizard Men ===
There are several types of Lizard Men in Marvel Comics:

- Lizard Men of Subterranea
- Lizard Men of Subterranea
- Lizard Men of Tok

=== The Lookups ===
The Lookers are a support group started by Edwin Jarvis for those who are associated with superheroes. It was funded by Tony Stark, who uses his technology to make its members anonymous to one another.

== M ==
=== Magistrates ===
The Magistrates are a police force that operate in the nation of Genosha.

=== Mandroids ===
The Mandroids are suits of power armor used by numerous organizations.

==== S.H.I.E.L.D. version ====
The Mandroids were originally designed and built for use by S.H.I.E.L.D. to provide the wearer with extensive offensive options so they could respond to various threats, including those from super-powered humans. The Mandroid power armor was constructed of a titanium alloy that provides enhanced protection from all types of attack and offers a life support systems. Sensors include infrared scanners and radar/sonar, along with a full-range radio and intercom system. The suits increase the wearer's strength and durability to superhuman levels. The main armament is the array of weaponry: electrostatic beams, lasers, magnetic force "punch-blasters", "neuro-stunners", and tractor/repellor beams.

==== Kree version ====
The Mandroids are used by the Kree Empire to hunt down traitors who rely on the Psych-Magnitron. A Kree Mandroid is used due to Yon-Rogg using the Psyche-Magnitron. It is destroyed when Mar-Vell tricks the robot into damaging the Psyche-Magnitron, causing the Kree Mandroid to fade away.

Ronan the Accuser retrieves a Universe Energy Core from a Psyche-Magnitron from Uatu's dome on the Moon and uses the Universal Energy Core to create Kree Mandroids, which are destroyed by the Fantastic Four.

==== Mandroids in other media ====
- The Mandroids appear in the Iron Man (1994) episode "Cell of Iron".
- The Mandroids appear in The Avengers: United They Stand episode "Command Decision".
- The Mandroids appear in The Avengers: Earth's Mightiest Heroes. This version is a mass-produced, blue-colored battlesuit utilized by S.H.I.E.L.D. and S.W.O.R.D.
- The Mandroids appear in Iron Man: Armored Adventures.
- The Mandroids appear in Iron Man: Rise of Technovore.
- The Mandroids appear in Avengers Assemble. These versions are unmanned mass-produced drones utilized by S.H.I.E.L.D. and Justin Hammer.

=== Mary Janes ===
The Mary Janes are an all-female band that appear in American comic books published by Marvel Comics. The Mary Janes were created by writer Jason Latour and artist Robbi Rodriguez, and first appeared in Edge of Spider-Verse #2 (September 2014).

On Earth-65, the Mary Janes are an all-female band that consists of Em Jay Watson on vocals and guitar, songwriter Glory Grant on keyboard, and Betty Brant on bass guitar. Other known members include Gwen Stacy on drums and Felicia Hardy on backup vocals.

==== Mary Janes in other media ====
- The Mary Janes, renamed the Emm-Jays, appear in the short film series Marvel Rising: Initiation (2018).
- The Mary Janes appear in the Sony Pictures Animation film Spider-Man: Across the Spider-Verse (2023).

=== Mavericks ===
The Mavericks are New Mexico's sanctioned superhero team and a part of the Fifty-State Initiative. Its known members are Annex, Geiger, and Jocasta. She-Thing was revealed to be a Skrull imposter.

=== Mayhem Organization ===
The Mayhem Organization is an organization that is led by the laser-wielding Mister Mayhem and consisted of the magician Mister Magic, the telepathic Mister Mind, and the super-strong Mister Muscle. They targeted a character called Mayhem and were defeated by Team America.

=== Menagerie ===
The Menagerie is a team of animal-themed villains led by White Rabbit. The lineup consisted of her, Hippo, Gypsy Moth (who had recently changed her name to Skein) and newcomer Panda-Mania. Despite Spider-Man having his clothes torn apart by Skein, he managed to defeat the quartet before fleeing back to his apartment to change. In later appearances, Swarm, Ox, Squid, Armadillo, and Man-Bull join Menagerie.

=== Midnight Wreckers ===
The Midnight Wreckers are a group of scavengers who allied with Dr. Peter Spaulding and Willie "Gears" Garvin during the robot revolution. They consist of Hassle, Bags, and Swift.

=== Mutant Liberation Front ===
The Mutant Liberation Front is the name of several organizations.

==== First Mutant Liberation Front ====
The Mutant Liberation Front first appeared in New Mutants #86, consisting of Strobe, Stryfe, Forearm, Rusty Collins, Dragoness, Kamikaze, Reaper, Skids, Sumo, Tempo, Thumbelina, Wildside, and Zero. The MLF was primarily an antagonist of the New Mutants and their successor group X-Force. They are eventually defeated by a consortium of X-Force, X-Factor, and the X-Men during the "X-Cutioner's Song" story arc.

==== Second Mutant Liberation Front ====
A second incarnation is assembled later by Reignfire. The team seemed mainly organized of disillusioned, anarchic mutant youths. Stryfe founded the group sometime after coming to the 20th century (from roughly 2,000 years in the future). Rusty Collins and Skids remain with the group due to mind control devices Stryfe implanted in them. After the organization is dismantled, Forearm, Reaper, Tempo and Wildside are recruited by Reignfire.

==== Third Mutant Liberation Front ====
A third incarnation was formed by an alternate version of Domino who operated as Stryfe. While Forearm, Zero, and Thumbelina joined the team, the rest of the membership consisted of Cannonball and Jon Spectre.

==== Fourth Mutant Liberation Front ====
A fourth incarnation was formed. While Dragoness, Forearm, Stobe, and Wildside joined the team, its new members include the brothers Kamikaze and Samurai while Selby was an associate member.

==== Mutant Liberation Front (Humanity's Last Stand) ====
Humanity's Last Stand formed a version of the Mutant Liberation Front which were actually humans who were given costume with teleportation devices or special drugs to empower them as part of a plot to discredit the mutants. They consisted of the armored robot Blastfurnace, Blindspot, Burnout, Corpus Delecti, Deadeye, and Thermal. This incarnation fought the Punisher, X-Cutioner, and a group of S.H.I.E.L.D. agents. Most of them were killed when Simon Trask blew up the compound they were in.

==== Sixth Mutant Liberation Front ====
A sixth incarnation was formed during the "Fall of X" storyline. After stealing the Captain Krakoa armor, Grant Rogers formed the Mutant Liberation Front with Blob, Fenris, and Wildside. The group fought the Uncanny Avengers and were defeated, with Captain Krakoa's identity being exposed in the process.

== N ==
=== N'Garai ===
The N'Garai are a race of demons created by Chthon, and have come into conflict with the Midnight Sons, the Hulk, and the X-Men. The N'Garai are ruled by Kierrok the Damned.

=== Nasty Boys ===
The Nasty Boys are a group of mutants who serve as the strike force of Mister Sinister and consist of Gorgeous George, Hairbag, Ramrod, Ruckus, and Slab.

In their initial appearance, the Nasty Boys are led by Steven Shaffran, a senator and mutant with the ability to alter probability in his favor. The Nasty Boys were taken into custody following their first appearance and battle in Washington D.C. Ramrod is subsequently deported from the US due to his immigrant status. Both Hairbag and Slab are rescued from prison by the Mutant Liberation Front. Sinister collects Hairbag from them, but Slab stays with the Mutant Liberation Front for several weeks to spend time with his sister Thumbelina.

The five members of the Nasty Boys are reunited when Sinister orders them to capture and kill Malice. Malice interrupts the Hawaiian vacation of Havok and his girlfriend Lorna Dane (a.k.a. Polaris) to kill Polaris. The Nasty Boys have a hard time controlling the situation, as Malice continues to jump between possessing Havok and Polaris's bodies. She uses their considerable powers against anyone in her way. Both Alex and Lorna are willing to die to end Malice once and for all, and their combined willpower forces Malice to be stuck between them. This allows Sinister to trap her. The Boys get away, as their battle does not draw the attention of the local authorities until after their getaway.

==== Nasty Boys in other media ====
The Nasty Boys appear in X-Men: The Animated Series, initially consisting of Gorgeous George (voiced by Rod Wilson), Hairbag, Ruckus (both voiced by Dan Hennessey), and Slab. Additionally, Morph appears as a temporary member, while Vertigo joins the group later in the series.

=== New Enforcers ===
The New Enforcers are one of several groups contesting for control of the remains of Kingpin's criminal empire. The New Enforcers' inner circle consists of Controller, Fixer, Madame Menace, Mentallo, and Mister Fear while their outer circle consists of Blitz, Dragon Man, Dreadnought, Eel, Plantman, Super-Adaptoid, Tangle, Thermite, and Vanisher.

=== New Immortals ===
The New Immortals are an organization established by the High Evolutionary to make his own race of immortals. They consist of Nobilus (who was created from Thor's DNA taken from his shaved beard), Juvan, and Zon. While Recorder #211 was rebuilt into Analyzer to work with the group, New Men member Count Tager became a member of the group after subjecting himself to the Pool of Knowledge.

=== New Marauders ===
The New Marauders are a group assembled by Miss Sinister and consisting of mutants who were displaced from their home universe (the Ultimate Marvel universe). Those among her New Marauders are Jimmy Hudson, Guardian (Derek Morgan), Quicksilver, Armor, and Mach-II (Nomi Blume). Jimmy Hudson later escapes and is rescued by the time-displaced X-Men.

Initially an ally of Miss Sinister, Emma Frost rejects her ideal and psychically controls Mach-II, Armor, and Guardian to turn them against Sinister. However, Sinister activates a kill-switch she had implanted in the three's genetic code, killing them instantly.

=== New York Bulletin ===
The New York Bulletin is a fictional New York City tabloid newspaper appearing as a plot element in American comic books published by Marvel Comics. It was created by Joe Simon and first appeared in Daring Mystery Comics #2 (December 1939).

=== Nova Corps ===
Nova Corps depicted in Marvel Comics

The Nova Corps is an intergalactic military and police force powered by Xandar's Worldmind, which grants it access to immense energy. Its members utilize energy manipulation to help maintain peace across the galaxy. The team is composed of beings from across the known universe, though it is rare for a corpsman to be appointed from Earth. Only a select few humans have joined the ranks, with Richard Rider and Sam Alexander being the most prominent among them.

==== Nova Corps in other media ====
===== Television =====
- The Nova Corps make cameo appearances in Silver Surfer.
- The Nova Corps appear in The Super Hero Squad Show episode "So Pretty When They Explode!".
- The Nova Corps appear in Ultimate Spider-Man, consisting of Sam Alexander and former member Titus.
- The Nova Corps appear in Guardians of the Galaxy, consisting of Sam Alexander, his father Jesse, Rhomann Dey, Irani Rael, and former member Titus. The second season introduces the Nova Centurions, an elite division dedicated to either protecting or destroying Adam Warlock depending on whether he becomes good or evil.

===== Marvel Cinematic Universe =====
The Nova Corps appear in live-action films set in the Marvel Cinematic Universe (MCU). They appear in Guardians of the Galaxy (2014), consisting of Nova Prime Irani Rael (portrayed by Glenn Close), Rhomann Dey (portrayed by John C. Reilly), and Garthan Saal (portrayed by Peter Serafinowicz). Nova Corps ships appear in the I Am Groot episode "Groot's Sweet Treat". Alternate universe iterations of the Nova Corps appear in the What If…? episodes "What If... Nebula Joined the Nova Corps?" and "What If... the Watcher Disappeared?".

===== Video games =====
- The Nova Corps appear in Guardians of the Galaxy: The Telltale Series.
- The Nova Corps appear in Marvel's Guardians of the Galaxy, consisting of Ko-Rel (voiced by Judith Baribeau), Nikki Gold (voiced by Romane Denis), and the Worldmind (voiced by Robert Montcalm and Leni Parker).

== O ==
=== O-Force ===
The O-Force is a superhuman team created for a reality television show where mutants compete for a place in the O-Force team. Its known members include Obituary, Ocean, Ocelot, Oink, Ooze, Optoman, Oracle, Orbit, Orchid, Orifice, and Overkill, while Ozone was a wannabe member who was rejected.

=== Octessence ===
The Octessence is a group made up of eight great mystical entities consisting of Balthakk, Cyttorak, Farallah, Ikonn, Krakkan, Raggadorr, Valtorr and Watoomb who gathered to determine who amongst them was most powerful. To this end, they created the Exemplars.

=== Offenders ===
The Offenders are a short-lived team meant to serve as an anti-Defenders group formed by the Collector and consisting of Red Hulk, Baron Mordo, Tiger Shark, and Terrax.

==== Offenders in other media ====
Hulu intended to air an animated special called The Offenders: Giant Sized Man-Thing with the titular team, consisting of Howard the Duck, MODOK, Hit-Monkey, Tigra, and Dazzler, going up against Man-Thing. All team members would have all had pre-established shows of their own. In January 2020, Howard the Duck and Tigra & Dazzler were shelved. M.O.D.O.K. went on to premiere in May 2021, and Hit-Monkey premiered in November 2021.

=== Omega Clan ===
Following the death of Omega Red, a secret organization known as "The White Sky" which is specialized in growing and programming unique assassins to meet all their clients' expectations, were hired to create three "clones" from the remains of the original Omega Red. These clones formed the Omega Clan. Each of these clones have different abilities from each other and they passionately hate X-Force just for the fact they were implanted with false memories to believe that X-Force members had killed their father.

The Omega Clan is composed of:

- Omega Black – A female clone of Omega Red, she goes by the programmed name of Sylvia Engel Rossovich. Omega Black's chest is implanted with five retractable Carbonadium tendrils which she can use to affect people with diseases, such as cancer.
- Omega White – A male clone of Omega Red, he has the power to create energy constructs similar to Omega Red's coils which he uses to drain the psychic energy and life force from his enemies. He is also able to render himself intangible, thus becoming immune to physical attacks.
- Omega Red – A male clone of Omega Red who is the closest member in terms of appearance and powers to the original Omega Red.

=== Orchis ===
Orchis are a human supremacist group who antagonized the X-Men during the Krakoan Age. It is directed by Killian Devo as the director and figurehead, Omega Sentinel of the Moira-10 (A) reality as the true leader, with MODOK Superior, Judas Traveller, Moira MacTaggert, Doctor Stasis, Fenris, Vulture, Edwin Martynec, Graydon Creed, Mister Clean, Nimrod, Sebastian Shaw, and Selene as prominent members.

=== Outcasts ===
The Outcasts is the name of two organizations.

==== Outcasts (Subterranea version) ====
The Outcasts are a group of characters first appearing in Fantastic Four Annual #13 (1978). The superhuman members of the Outcasts first appeared in Marvel Treasury Edition #25 (1980) and were created by Bill Mantlo and Sal Buscema. The Outcasts subsequently appear in Rom Spaceknight #28 (March 1982) and The Invincible Iron Man Annual #12 (1991). The Outcasts are people who are ugly, deformed, or disabled who believe themselves to be outcasts in human society and have therefore chosen to live under the Mole Man's rule in Subterranea. The Mole Man has granted superhuman powers to a number of the Outcasts. They were first used in Mole Man's fight with Kala. This conflict drew the attention of Hulk and Spider-Man which led to Mole Man and Kala calling a truce.

The members are:

- Boulder - Boulder has superhuman strength and durability. His current whereabouts is unknown.
- Digger - Digger can slice through most substances with his clawed hands. His current whereabouts are unknown.
- Landslide - Landslide can induce shattering internal vibrations within a person or object by touching it. This includes the ability to create earthquake tremors. His current whereabouts are unknown.
- Water Witch - Water Witch controls water with a wand. She can also project ice, water or steam. She was briefly a member of the Femizons. Her current whereabouts are unknown.

==== Outcasts (Mutants version) ====
The Outcasts are a group of mutants. They were depicted as disguised as an entertainment troupe during the Age of Apocalypse. The group includes Brute, Mastermind, Soaron, Toad, X-Man, and their leader, Forge. Later recruits were Sonique and Essex. All but Sonique, Soaron and X-Man were killed by either Essex or Domino and her Marauders.

=== Outlaws ===
The Outlaws are an elite version of the Wild Pack.

=== Outliers ===
The Outliers are a group of young mutants on the run from a mutant-hunting organization ran by Dr. Corina Ellis and Hag. The group eventually are found by and join the X-Men. The Outliers consists of Deathdream, Jitter, Ransom, Calico, and Calico's horse Ember.

== P ==
=== Pacific Overlords ===
The Pacific Overlords are a supervillain team consisted largely of humans who were mutated by Doctor Demonicus.

=== People's Defense Force ===
The People's Defense Force is the name of two organizations.

==== Hungary version ====
The People's Defense Force is a team of Eastern European superbeings who individually fought Hank Pym during his earliest exploits as Ant-Man and Giant-Man. They operate out of the Bratislava Prison Superhuman Research Complex and consist of the Beasts of Berlin, Madame X, the Scarlet Beetles, El Toro, and Voice.

==== China version ====
Following the breakup of China Force, the Chinese government establishes a second version of the People's Defense Force led by Collective Man and consisting of Lady of Ten Suns, Most Perfect Hero, Ninth Immortal, Radioactive Man, Scientific Beast, and Spirit Animal. The People's Defense Force engage Unspoken and are defeated, with most of its members being killed.

=== Point Men ===
The Point Men is Hawaii's sanctioned superhero team that is part of the Fifty-State Initiative. Its known members are Stingray, Devil-Slayer, Star Sign, and Paydirt. Magnitude was revealed to be a Skrull infiltrator.

=== Power Elite ===
The Power Elite is a cabal of influential brokers that came together to strengthen the country after Hydra's brief takeover of the United States. Its known members include Thunderbolt Ross, Phil Coulson, Selene, Wilson Fisk, Norman Osborn, Aleksander Lukin, Zeke Stane, Baron Strucker, and Taskmaster.

=== Purple Children ===
The Purple Children were created by writer Mark Waid and artist Chris Samnee, and debuted in Daredevil vol. 4 #8 (September 2014). The Purple Children are a group of five children—Joe, Connor, Shallah, Jamie, and a fifth, as yet unnamed, girl—all conceived by the Purple Man during his numerous affairs with women he kept under his mind control.

== R ==
=== Raksha ===
The Raksha are a team of mutant vigilantes operating in Madripoor. They first appeared X-Men: Blue (Vol. 1) #6 (June, 2017) and were created by Cullen Bunn, Ray-Anthony Height, and Ramon Bachs. They were inspired by Wolverine's time in the country and are therefore quite violent. The team consists Gazing Nightshade, Whisper Doll, Hexadecimal, and their leader Norio.

=== Rand Corporation ===
The Rand Corporation (also known as Rand Enterprises or Rand Industries) is one of the world's largest and most influential multinational corporations, primarily serving as financial backing for the activities of its CEO, Danny Rand / Iron Fist.

==== Rand Corporation in other media ====
- Rand Industries appears in Ultimate Spider-Man.
- Rand Enterprises appears in Marvel's Netflix television series Daredevil, Luke Cage, Iron Fist, and The Defenders (2017).
- Rand Corporation appears in Marvel's Spider-Man.

=== Ravagers ===
The Ravagers are a group of space pirates led by Yondu. They originated in the Marvel Cinematic Universe before being introduced into the comics.

==== Ravagers in other media ====
The Ravagers appear in Guardians of the Galaxy (2015).

=== Resistants ===
The Resistants, also known as Mutant Force, originated as the second incarnation of the Brotherhood of Mutants, but later became an independent group. They were originally gathered by Magneto.

- The first group consists of Peepers, Slither, Shocker, Lifter, and Burner and was founded by Magneto after the original Brotherhood of Mutants disbanded. The group later fell under the leadership of Mandrill, who renamed the group Mutant Force.
- The Red Skull offers the team funding and renames them the Resistants. As the Resistants, the team oppose the Mutant Registration Act. During this time, many mutants joined the team, including Mist Mistress and Think Tank.

==== Resisistant in other media ====
The Mutant Force appear in the X-Men: The Animated Series episode "Sanctuary", consisting of Lifter, Peepers, Shocker, and Slither.

=== Right ===
The Right is an anti-mutant organization founded by Cameron Hodge that first appeared in X-Factor #17 (June 1987). The Right employed commandos in high-tech flying battle suits of powered armor with machine guns, missiles, and (presumably to disturb or distract their victims) faceplates resembling a smiley face. They faced off against X-Factor and the New Mutants.

=== Rocketeers ===
The Rocketeers are beings who wear special costumes with rockets on their backs, enabling the wearers to fly. The Rocketeers also fire rockets as weapons from portable launching equipment they carry. The Rocketeers' costumes and equipment were designed by the Dire Wraiths for use against the Spaceknights of Galador. The Rocketeers' costumes are, however, inferior imitations of their prototype, which was worn by the Torpedo until his death.

== S ==
=== S-Men ===
The S-Men are a group of supervillains who were formed by a clone of Red Skull to serve as his version of the X-Men with the main objective to destroy mutantkind. The team is made up of people who have all suffered atrocities at the hands of mutants during their life, including those who have seen their families slaughtered by evil mutants. Its members include the Goat-Faced Girl, Dancing Water (the illegitimate daughter of Avalanche), Dangerous Jinn, Insect, Living Wind, Honest John, Mzee, and an unidentified monk. With the help of Red Skull and Arnim Zola, these people have gone through lengthy and painful genetic alterations involving mad science and magical artifacts to gain the powers they now possess. However, some may have been born with their powers and others, such as Dancing Water, may be mutants. In a fit of rage over finding mutants being used for freak medical experiments, Magneto kills most of the S-Men. Honest John, Dangerous Jinn, and the monk are the only survivors of the attack.

=== S.A.D.S.A.K. ===
The S.A.D.S.A.K.s (Support Alliance Derby for Sensationally Abled Kids) is a group of young Inhumans led by Moon Girl and consisting of Devinder, a boy with super speed, Will, a boy with wings and the ability to talk to birds, and Tasha, a girl with prehensile hair. They initially had another member named "OMG" Olivia who is an internet influencer, but is later revealed to be a junior Kree agent who creates a hair conditioner filled with mind-controlling nanites. The SADSAKs later team up to defeat her.

=== Santerians ===
The Santerians are a superhero team debuting in Daredevil: Father #2 (Oct. 2005) by Joe Quesada. They are a group of magical vigilantes with powers and aliases rooted in Santerian religion. They are led by Eleggua (Nestor Rodriguez), and consist of Oshun, Chango, Ogun and Oya.

=== School ===
The School are a gang of young Atleanteans that lived in the Atlantean capital's slums. They are led by Squid and consist of Crab, Minnow, Mussels, Seahorse, and Seaweed. They rose up against the capital's inhabitants before being defeated by Namorita.

=== Sentinel Squad O*N*E ===
Sentinel Squad O*N*E is a part of the Office of National Emergency. The group first appeared in Decimation: House of M - The Day After #1 (January 2006), and was created by Chris Claremont and Randy Green. Sentinel Squad O*N*E are deployed to protect and observe the remaining mutants following M-Day.

==== Sentinel Squad O*N*E in other media ====
Sentinel Squad O*N*E appears in the X-Men '97 episode "Survival of the Fittest".

=== Serval Industries ===
Serval Industries is a multi-billion dollar corporation owned by Harrison Snow, that hired its own X-Factor team. It first appeared in All-New X-Factor #1 (January 2014).

=== Seven Daggers of Latveria ===
The Seven Daggers of Latveria are a team of Latverian mutants who are loyal to Doctor Doom. They consist of Dreamer, Ironcloak, Nerium, Slag, Volta, and two unnamed members.

=== Shadow Council ===
The Shadow Council is an organization that was founded by Aloysius Thorndrake and the Confederacy soldiers with him after they went through the Vanishing Point and came in contact with an entity called the Abyss.

==== Shadow Council in other media ====
An original incarnation of the Shadow Council appears in Avengers Assemble. This version is a secret organization once led by Heinrich Zemo in the 1940s. By the present, a new version of the Shadow Council is formed, led by Killmonger and consisting of Ulysses Klaue, Madame Masque, Tiger Shark, Princess Zanda, and M'Baku.

=== Shadow Initiative ===
The Shadow Initiative is a special "black ops" team within the Initiative, answerable only to Henry Peter Gyrich and known as the Shadow Initiative. This team comprises Bengal, Trauma, Constrictor, Mutant Zero, and, for a time, the Scarlet Spiders. It is later revealed that the Scarlet Spiders are clones of Michael Van Patrick (MVP), a deceased initiative recruit.

After Secret Invasion, Taskmaster is added to the Black-Ops team as their field leader. The Shadow Initiative, joined by Komodo, is assigned to take down a Hydra cell, led by former Initiative member Hardball, in Madripoor. After the mission briefing, Taskmaster senses something familiar about Mutant Zero and later confronts her. A fight ensues and Taskmaster goads Mutant Zero into revealing her true identity: Mary Walker.

During the "Dark Reign" storyline, Butterball, Ringer, Doctor Sax, Johnny Guitar, Badd Axe, Firearms, Slaughter Boy, and the members of Heavy Mettle join Bengal, Komodo and Batwing in a new Shadow Initiative. As Norman Osborn already has a covert team in the form of the Thunderbolts, the Shadow Initiative is turned into a "cannon fodder" unit, purposely sent on suicide missions, a fact that is hidden from the Shadow Initiative members. During a siege to take back Prison 42, Johnny Guitar, Blackwing, Slaughterboy, and Firearms are killed in action. Bengal and the surviving members of the Shadow Initiative realize the true nature of their mission.

=== Shadow-X ===
Shadow-X (also known as the Dark X-Men) is an alternate reality team of X-Men possessed by the Shadow King. The team debuted in New Excalibur #1, assisting the villain Albion before joining the side of Excalibur against him. The team consisted of possessed versions of Professor X, Cyclops, Marvel Girl, Iceman, Beast, and Angel, all of whom died.

=== Shogun Reapers ===
The Shogun Reapers are mechas among the Yakuza. They built a cannon on the Moon to hold Earth hostage while Nick Fury Jr. broke into their base to steal their powering device. The Shogun Reapers' leader Danny Fear and lieutenant Akihiko are outfitted in shogun mechas for a confrontation. Akihiko's suit gets hacked by the agent of S.H.I.E.L.D. to fight Danny Fear which decompressed the room and caused all the gangsters to be swallowed into space, killing Akihiko while the group's leader survived .

==== Shogun Reapers in other media ====
Akihiko appears in Avengers: Endgame, portrayed by Hiroyuki Sanada. This version is a leader of the Yakuza.

=== Sinister Squadron ===
The Sinister Squadron is a multiversal team that was founded by a mysterious person to make sure the Spider-Society is never formed. The first member seen is the Gwen Stacy version of Green Goblin from an unidentified reality who abducted Spider-Man 2099. Lady Araña worked to rescue him while avoiding the Green Goblin. The rest of the line-up is led by the Aunt May version of Madame Web and consists of various alternate universe versions of Spider-Man's enemies.

=== Sisterhood of the Wasp ===
The Sisterhood of the Wasp is a group that is led by the Insect-esque All-Mother during the "Spider-Island" storyline.

=== Sisters of Sin ===
The Sisters of Sin are a group of young orphan girls who were accelerated into adulthood and given psionic powers by the Red Skull after being indoctrinated by Sinthea Shmidt and Mother Night. The Sisters of Sin would have many run-ins with Captain America before being de-aged when they entered a chamber designed to reverse the Red Skull's aging process and they were restored to children. The group's brainwashed members consisted of Sister Agony, Sister Death, Sister Dream, and Sister Pleasure.

=== Six-Fingered Hand ===
The Six-Fingered Hand is a group of six lesser demons acting as pawns of more powerful demons, including Mephisto. The legion of demons once plotted to merge Earth and Hell, but their plan was successfully opposed by the Defenders. The six are also responsible for the creation of the Lesser Grey God, a statuette which has the power to reactivate old curses.

- Avarrish, who has also clashed with Ghost Rider (Johnny Blaze)/Zarathos.
- Fashima, who has also clashed with Ghost Rider (Johnny Blaze)/Zarathos.
- Hyppokri
- Puishannt, who has also clashed with Dracula.
- Unthinnk, who has also clashed with (and possessed) Man-Thing.
- Maya, the sixth and final member of the Six Fingered Hand, was actually a disguised Mephisto.

=== Skeleton Crew ===
The Skeleton Crew is an organization built by the Red Skull from his operatives.

=== Sons of Satannish ===
The Sons of Satannish were a cult of sorcerers who received mystical power from Satannish.

=== Sons of the Tiger ===
The Sons of the Tiger are a trio of martial arts who are students of Master Kee: Lin Sun, of Chinese ancestry, is the leader of the trio and adopted son of Master Kee; Abe Brown is an African American from the streets of Harlem; and Robert Diamond is a Caucasian Hollywood actor.

Lin Sun is returning from a martial arts tournament with his first place trophy when he is suddenly attacked by ninjas in front of his school in San Francisco. After defeating the villains, he goes into the "Tiger Dojo", which has been ransacked. He finds a dying Master Kee, who tells him that there are forces in this world which would destroy us and then points to a box on a shelf, after which he dies. In the box, Lin finds three amulets made of jade, a tiger's head and two claws: the symbol of the school. The inscription at the base of the box reads, "When three are called and stand as one, as one they'll fight, their will be done...For each is born anew, The Tiger's Son." They are later known as "the Amulets of Power".

Soon after, Lin meets up with his two friends, Abe Brown and Bob Diamond, who have also been attacked by ninjas. Lin recounts the story of Master Kee's death and gives each of them one of the jade tiger claw amulets. They soon discover that when they join hands and chant the inscription from the box they become mystically connected. Their martial arts skills combine to become one force and their physical abilities are tripled when they wear the amulets.

Beginning in Deadly Hands of Kung Fu #19, entitled "An Ending", the trio breaks up and Lin Sun throws all three amulets in a trash can located in an alley. There, Hector Ayala finds the amulets and wears them to become White Tiger. The Sons of the Tiger appeared in the next two stories, "A Beginning" and "To Claw the Eyes of Night", during the transition to the White Tiger stories. The character of Abe Brown is mostly seen periodically after that. The book continued using the title "The Sons of the Tiger", even though the trio had split up and power was transferred to White Tiger.

=== Stane International ===
Stane International is a company run by Obadiah Stane.

=== Strikeforce One ===
Strikeforce One is an organization formed by Master of the World, who created its members to serve him. They consist of Amazon (a clone of She-Hulk), Behemoth (a clone of Hulk), Demi-God (a clone of Hercules), Dragonfist (a clone of Iron Fist), Knight-Errant (a clone of Black Knight), She-Cat (a clone of White Tiger), and Stinger (a clone of Ant-Man).

=== Super-Axis ===
The Super-Axis is a group consisting of Invaders enemies Master Man, U-Man, Baron Blood, and Warrior Woman and assembled by Lady Lotus. Using hypnotism to summon and control the villains, Lotus intends to use the newly formed Super-Axis to undermine the United States on the home front during World War II. Individual members initially skirmish with the Invaders, and the original Human Torch is also hypnotised. In a final battle at an amusement park, the entire Super-Axis confront the Invaders, but are defeated by the heroes' superior teamwork. The Human Torch also frees himself from Lotus' control, and attempts to locate the villain, who has fled.

=== Supernovas ===
The Supernovas are a black ops unit of the Nova Corps. They were also called the Black Novas because their helmets were black instead of yellow. Its members include Adomox, Jesse Alexander, Mister Z's, Phlish, and Titus. Sam Alexander used to be a member of this group until he learned their true motives.

== T ==
=== Thieves Guild ===
The Thieves Guild is an organization of criminals with several branches and sets of rules.

The Thieves Guild's New Orleans branch is a rival of the Assassins Guild. Jean-Luc LeBeau is the adoptive father of Gambit and a former leader of the Thieves Guild.

Odessa Drake is the leader of the New York branch of the Thieves Guild.

==== Thieves Guild in other media ====
- The Thieves Guild appears in the X-Men: The Animated Series episode "X-Ternally Yours".
  - The Thieves Guild appears in the X-Men '97 episode "The Dead Man's Hand".
- The Thieves Guild appears in the X-Men: Evolution episode "Cajun Spice".
- The Thieves Guild appears in the Wolverine and the X-Men episode "Thieves' Gambit".

=== Thor Corps ===
The Thor Corps is the name of two organizations.

==== Eric Masterson's version ====
This version of the Thor Corps came together when Eric Masterson (who was the host of Thor at the time) united with Beta Ray Bill and Dargo Ktor to fight Zarrko after he tricked the latter into fighting Thor.

==== Battleworld's Thor Corps ====
The Thor Corps are a police force on Battleworld who enforce the laws of God Emperor Doom. King Thor serves as their lawspeaker while Thunderer Thorlief is a prominent Thor Corps member.

=== Threshold ===
The Threshold is an ancient society created by the use of time travel by Kate Pryde placing the genetic material of the people of Genosha into a mysterium box known as "the Seed". It first appeared in Marauders (vol. 2) #4 (July 2022).

This society thrived in the Proterozoic era. The society would face many enemies, such as an ancient Shi'ar, and the Unbreathing. Threshold was responsible for the creation of the X-Men enemies, Sublime and Arkea, who would turn on their creators before being defeated by Cassandra Nova. The Unbreathing, led by Stryfe, went on to destroy Threshold. A few members of the society survived, including Grove, Xilo, and the Threshold Three.

==== Threshold Three ====
The Threshold Three were a group of three mutants; Amass, Crave, and Theia, whose powers allowed them to travel forward in time to seek help for Threshold in its war against the Unbreathing.

=== Tiger Division ===
Tiger Division (briefly known as Doom's Division) is South Korea's sanctioned superhero team. The group is led by the National Intelligence Service's director White Fox with Taegukgi as the field leader. The team's original roster consisted of the General, Gun-R, Mr. Enigma, Auntie Ante (later known as Lady Bright), and Luna Snow. When it was renamed Doom's Division during the "One World Under Doom" storyline, Wave, Karma, and Aero also joined the team.

=== Tombstone's Gang ===
Tombstone's Gang is a gang organized by Tombstone. He would later get the brothers Grim and Reaper as his minions.

=== Tough Kid Squad ===
The Tough Kid Squad is a group of five kids consisting of Wally and Tom Danger, Derrick Dawes, Butch, and Eagle.

=== Tracksuit Mafia ===
The Tracksuit Mafia (also called the Tracksuit Bros. and the Tracksuit Draculas) are a gang of non-superpowered organized criminals. Created by writer Matt Fraction, they first appeared in Hawkeye (vol. 4) in 2012. They are so named because the eponymous athletic wear in which all of its members are seen, who serve as adversaries to Hawkeye.

==== Tracksuit Mafia in other media ====
The Tracksuit Mafia appear in Hawkeye (2021). This version is led by Wilson Fisk / Kingpin, with known members including Kazi Kazimierczak, Ivan, Tomas, Enrique and Dmitri. William Lopez was a leader, but following his death, Maya Lopez became the new leader until she defected.

=== Trash ===
Trash are a street gang of young mutants hired by the mutant drug lord, the Garbage Man. They first appeared in Power Pack #31 (August 1987) by Louise Simonson and Jon Bogdanove. The team consisted of Airhead, Blasting Cap, Brute, Crazy Legs, Razor Cut, Thor Kid, and Troop.

=== Triumph Division ===
The Triumph Division is the Philippines' sanctioned superhero team. The team is led by Red Feather and its members include Anitun, Fighter One, Great Mongoose, Mighty Mother, St. George, and Wishing Man. The Triumph Division's members are killed by suicide bombers, with their successors being made public.

During "The War of the Realms" storyline, Wave joins the Triumph Division.

=== Triune Understanding ===
The Triune Understanding is a religious cult. It was created by Kurt Busiek for volume three of the Marvel Comics Avengers series.

== U ==
=== U.S. Hulk Operations ===
The U.S. Hulk Operations is a United States military organization that is tasked with hunting down Hulk and his allies. It is led by General Reginald Fortean. After Fortean is killed, Hulk takes control of the U.S. Hulk Operations.

=== Undying Ones ===
The Undying Ones are a race of humanoid demons from another dimension. They are led by the Nameless One.

=== Unlimited Class Wrestling Federation ===
The Unlimited Class Wrestling Federation (UCWF) is a wrestling promotion based in New York by promoter Edward Garner with a roster of both human (i.e. Sharon Ventura) and superhuman participants from the Eternals like Ikaris to heroes from Ben Grimm/The Thing, Justice, and Demolition Man. It was soon taken over by the Power Broker as a site for his experimental superhuman trials and the base of the Grapplers.

=== Unus' Gang ===
Unus' Gang is a loose group of mutants assembled by Unus the Untouchable who survived the destruction of Genosha by Cassandra Nova. They would act as enemies towards the Genoshan Excalibur team. They would later all lose their powers after M-Day. The team consisted of Unus, Toad, Hub, Caiman, Glamour, Lightning Rod, Shocker, and Toad-In-Waiting.

== V ==
=== V-Battalion ===
The V-Battalion is a secret organization composed of Golden Age superheroes and their descendants.

=== Vulturions ===
The Vulturions are a group of criminals who wield the same technology as Vulture. It was established by Honcho, an engineer who was shown the designs of Adrian Toomes's Vulture armor.

A new group of Vulturions (consisting of three members including a female) appear in Avengers: The Initiative, where they steal a briefcase containing classified research on gamma radiation from Baron Von Blitzschlag. One of the Vulturions is identified as Honcho (apparently released from prison and having gone back to crime). They are stopped with ease by a costume-less Peter Parker and the Scarlet Spiders.

==== Vulturions in other media ====
A group loosely based on the Vulturions called the Wake Riders appear in the Spider-Man episode "Rise Above It All". Based on the name for a group of vultures, they are a viral stunt group.

== W ==
=== Warbound ===
The Warbound are a group of gladiators from the planet Sakaar that were gathered by Hulk. They consist of Korg, Miek, No-Name the Brood, Hiroim, Elloe Kaifi, and Lavin Skee.

==== Warbound in other media ====
- The Warbound appear in Planet Hulk (2010).
- A version of the Warbound appear in Thor: Ragnarok. This version of the group are gladiator warriors who are pitted against each other in games held by the Grandmaster.

=== Wild Sentinels ===
The Wild Sentinels are a type of Sentinel based on salvaged parts, weapons and vehicles that gives them a wide variety of forms. They first appeared in New X-Men #114 (May 2001), and was created by Grant Morrison and Frank Quitely.

The Wild Sentinels are initially created by Master Mold in Ecuador. Cassandra Nova later takes control of the Sentinels and uses them to attack Genosha.

==== Wild Sentinels in other media ====
- A Wild Sentinel appears as a boss in Marvel Heroes.
- The Wild Sentinels appear in X-Men '97.

=== Wildboys ===
The Wildboys are a pair of street-dwellers that commit violent acts of vandalism. They are highly formidable street-fighters and are greatly skilled in the use of knives and other conventional street hardware. When the Horsemen of Apocalypse attacked Manhattan during the events of the Fall of the Mutants and caused a blackout, Vietnam War veteran Ammo organized a gang including the Wildboys, who looted the city.

=== Wolf Spiders ===
The Wolf Spiders are a special ops team trained by the Red Room and serve as the male counterpart of the Black Widow program. The first candidate was Niko Constantin, an assassin who is imprisoned in a gulag (alongside Boris Bullski and Unicorn). At the prison, he is the sadistic leader of his own gang and sold out Bucky Barnes / Winter Soldier to Andre Rostov.

=== Wolfpack ===
The Wolfpack are a group of five teenagers who reside in the South Bronx, in New York City. They were originally selected for their extraordinary abilities and aptitude by a retired Naval officer known only as Mr. Mack. He trained each of them separately from adolescence into their teen years in hand-to-hand combat, strategy, stealth, speed, endurance, and raw strength. When they were ready, he introduced them to each other. According to ancient legend, the Wolfpack has existed for at least two millennia, and serves as a cosmic balance to a group of mortal men completely devoid of compassion, love or charity, known as the Nine. The new Wolfpack soon began battling the forces of the Nine in the Bronx and continue to protect and patrol the Bronx, and battle the forces of The Nine.

An alternate universe iteration of the Wolfpack appears in House of M as a gang of superpowered teens in the Bronx. Members include Robbie Baldwin, Turbo, Darkhawk, Rage, Alex Power with his sister Julie and Raphael Vega, who is their leader.

=== Women Warriors ===
The Women Warriors are Delaware's sanctioned superhero team and a part of the Fifty-State Initiative. It consists of Asp, Black Mamba, Diamondback, Quicksand, and Skein.

=== World Counterterrorism Agency ===
The World Counterterrorism Agency (W.C.A.) is a counterterrorism organization founded by a group of ex-S.H.I.E.L.D. agents, including Mockingbird, following the events of the Secret Invasion storyline. Other members include Hawkeye and Dominic Fortune.

== X ==
=== X-Cell ===
X-Cell is a group of depowered mutants who blamed the government for causing M-Day. They are led by Elijah Cross and consist of Abyss, Blob, Callisto, Fatale, Marrow, and Reaper. They engaged X-Factor on different occasions and even shanghaied Rictor into their group. When they ran into Quicksilver, he used the Terrigen Mist to repower Elijah Cross, Abyss, Fatale, Reaper, and Rictor while Callisto advised Marrow not to take the offer after her own experience with the Terrigen Mist. During the fight with X-Factor, Elijah Cross felt a heat build-up and exploded from the side effect of the Terrigen Mist. Before that side-effect can take effect on them, Abyss flung Fatale and Reaper into the Brimstone Dimension and followed them. Callisto and Marrow escaped into the sewers while Rictor avoided the side-effects by using his powers to break the Terrigen Crystals on Quicksilver's body.

=== X-Cellent ===
The X-Cellent is a team of mutants led by Zeitgeist with the goal of preparing for a supposed coming culture war. The team first appeared in Giant-Size X-Statix #1 (July 2019) and was created by Peter Milligan and Mike Allred. The team appeared in two five-issue limited series in 2022 and 2023.

The team consisted of Fluff, Hurt John, Joe Bomb, Mirror Girl, Pood, Stripe, Toodle Pip, Uno, Whoosh, and led by Zeitgeist.

=== X-Men Green ===
X-Men Green is an eco-terrorism organization founded and led by Nature Girl. The team first appeared in X-Men Unlimited Infinity Comic #7 (October, 2021) and was created by Gerry Duggan and Emilio Laiso.

The team was founded due to Nature Girl's dissatisfaction with humanity's pollution of the planet. The team initially consisted of Nature Girl, Curse, and a stray dog they named Saoirse, before recruiting Sauron, Armageddon Man, and Gwen Warren.

== Y ==
=== Young Gods ===
The Young Gods are a group of twelve young human beings who were chosen by the major pantheons of Earth's goddesses to represent the finest qualities of humanity and the pinnacle of humanity's genetic potential and cultural accomplishment.

== See also ==
- List of government agencies in Marvel Comics
- List of criminal organizations in Marvel Comics
