= Random (comics) =

- Random as depicted in X-Factor #94 (September 1993). Art by Paul Ryan.

Publication information
- Publisher: Marvel Comics
- First appearance: X-Factor #88 (March 1993)
- Created by: Peter David; Joe Quesada

In-story information
- Alter ego: Marshall Evan Stone III
- Species: Human mutant
- Team affiliations: Acolytes; Brotherhood of Mutants; Dark Descendants; Strikeforce; X-Factor; Utopians; S.W.O.R.D.
- Notable aliases: Alex
- Abilities: Protoplasmic physiology; Shapeshifting; Ability to counter other mutant powers

Random (Marshall Evan Stone III) is a fictional character and antihero appearing in American comic books published by Marvel Comics. The character was created by writer Peter David for the series X-Factor. He was originally presented as an opponent of X-Factor, but he later became their reluctant ally.

== Fictional character biography ==
Random's full background is unknown. In his first encounter with the government-sponsored team X-Factor, Random is called in to bring back a group of Genoshan renegades called the X-Patriots, who refuse to leave a hospital where one of their comrades is being treated. Random and X-Factor clash and, wanting to end the fight quickly, team leader Havok buys out Random's contract.

Because of his success as a bounty hunter, Random is contracted to go after X-Factor member Polaris. During their battle, Random tells Polaris that her employers also hired him to kill her. Polaris does not believe him, but he assures her that there are mutant haters in the government. After a brief scuffle, Polaris leaves. She later confesses to Havok that she felt Random was holding back during the fight, as if he wanted her to win.

=== Joining X-Factor ===
After X-Factor encounters the religious fanatic Haven, Random visits X-Factor members Wolfsbane and Strong Guy, confessing to them that the government agents who had previously hired him are now after his life as well. In exchange for protection, he agrees to tell X-Factor who hired him to kill Polaris. The team sets out to find Haven, and Forge hires Random's services against Haven for $15,000 and a new car, so he tags along. When they locate Haven, she transports Random and the rest of X-Factor to a pocket dimension, where she shows them how much they need her. In this world, Random begins to revert to his protoplasmic state. When Haven returns the team to the real world, Random is completely gelatinous, but quickly pulls himself together and refuses to talk to the team about it. Following Haven's defeat, Forge pays Random and offers him a permanent job on the team, which he declines.

=== The Brotherhood ===
Random returns after Havok re-forms the Brotherhood of Mutants. He and Havok clash until Havok reveals to him the true nature of his mission: He is attempting to undermine the Brotherhood from within. The duo then help liberate the subjects of Dark Beast's experiments.

Random is next hired by Exodus to assist the Acolytes. Exodus promises to help his new operatives find a cure for the Legacy Virus if they capture the Knights of Wundagore. When they fail, Exodus leaves them stranded in the Savage Land.

=== Weapon X ===
Random and Diamond Lil trying to revolt from Weapon X.

Random is captured by the refurbished Weapon X program in their attempt to exterminate mutants. He is placed in Neverland, a mutant concentration camp, and attempts a coup with the help of Diamond Lil. However, the inmates do not realize that their powers are being negated by Leech, and they are both severely punished for their actions.

=== Post M-Day ===
Random is one of the few mutants who retain their superhuman powers after M-Day. Random again works with Exodus, joining his new team of Acolytes and participating in an attack on the S.H.I.E.L.D. Helicarrier.

Random and the Acolytes attack the Xavier Institute on a mission from Mister Sinister to retrieve Destiny's diaries. However, the diaries they find are fake. After a battle with Colossus, Shadowcat, and several students, the Acolytes are forced to return to Sinister emptyhanded.

=== House of X ===
Random is among the mutants invited to come live on the newly established mutant island of Krakoa, provided he no longer holds any grudges towards his fellow mutants.

== Powers and abilities ==
Random's body is made of morphing protoplasm which can change into almost any shape he can imagine and commonly changes his forearms into weapons that fire hardened protoplasm projectiles from his own biomatter. He is able to randomly counteract any force or mutant ability directed at him, alter his mass and strength and rapidly regenerate damaged or detached/severed biomatter and limbs.

== Reception ==
In 2014, Entertainment Weekly ranked Random 91st in their "Let's rank every X-Man ever" list.

== In other media ==
Random makes non-speaking cameo appearances in X-Men: The Animated Series.
