= Unus the Untouchable =

Marvel Comics fictional character

Publication information
- Publisher: Marvel Comics
- First appearance: X-Men #8 (November 1964)
- Created by: Stan Lee (writer); Jack Kirby (artist)

In-story information
- Alter ego: Angelo "Unus" Unuscione; legally changed to Gunther Bain
- Species: Human mutant
- Team affiliations: Factor Three; Brotherhood of Mutants; Secret Empire; Unus' Gang
- Abilities: Force field generation Hand-to-hand combat

Unus the Untouchable (also known as Gunther Bain, born Angelo Unuscione) is a supervillain appearing in American comic books published by Marvel Comics. Unus is a mutant, and is named for his ability to consciously project an invisible force field which protects him from harm.

== Publication history ==
Unus first appeared in X-Men #8 (November 1964), and was created by Stan Lee and Jack Kirby.

== Fictional character biography ==
Angelo Unuscione was born in Milan, Italy. After his arrival in the United States, he legally changed his name to Gunther Bain. He became a wrestler, and, when Beast briefly left the X-Men, he was able to defeat him in a wrestling match. Once in America, he sought out the Brotherhood of Mutants to join them. He turned criminal, and joined with the Brotherhood as they fought the X-Men. During the battle, his powers were enhanced by a shot fired from Beast's gun, increasing his power beyond his ability to control it, and making him unable to touch anything. He promised to reform, and his normal power level was restored by Beast.

Unus joins the organization Factor Three in a conspiracy to conquer Earth. They battle the X-Men, but turn against the Mutant Master when the latter is exposed as an extraterrestrial. Unus later works with Blob and Mastermind as agents of the Secret Empire. Not long after, Unus decides to retire as a criminal, deciding to use his powers as a wrestler.

Coming out of retirement and teaming with the Blob again, Unus discovers that his powers have become nearly uncontrollable. Unus loses control of his powers and his force field becomes so thick that he suffocates and loses consciousness. Blob, believing Unus to be dead, rampages through Brooklyn, leading to a fight with Spider-Man and Black Cat.

Unus reappears on the decimated island of Genosha, traumatized by the devastation and speaking of "ghosts". At some point, he stopped seeing ghosts, and returned to his former hubris. While on Genosha, Unus is one of countless mutants who lose their powers following the events of "Decimation". He is later found by Quicksilver, who restores his powers using Terrigen Mist.

== Powers and abilities ==
Unus the Untouchable is a mutant who possesses the power to generate a field of invisible psionic energy around his body. The field acts to deflect objects and even energy beams, and can withstand great concussive force. Normally, Unus can control the force field at will and certain types of radiant energy, such as sunlight, can pass through the field, as do air and sound waves (at least within certain unknown limits). Unus has deflected beams of energy, objects of high mass, objects traveling at high speed, and telepathy, including that of Charles Xavier.
