= Mentallo =

Fictional comic book villain

Publication information
- Publisher: Marvel Comics
- First appearance: Strange Tales #141 (Feb. 1966)
- Created by: Stan Lee (writer); Jack Kirby (artist)

In-story information
- Alter ego: Marvin Flumm
- Species: Human mutant
- Team affiliations: A.I.M. S.H.I.E.L.D. Hydra; Resistants; New Enforcers
- Partnerships: Fixer
- Notable aliases: Think Tank; Iron Patriot; Master of Psionics
- Abilities: Limited psionic powers: Illusion casting; Telekinetic shield; Mental manipulation; Levitation; Psychic possession; Ability to send mental probes that function as a radar-sense; Wears a battle-suit Use of various gadgets & weapons (Think Tank): Rides a small tread-propelled vehicle equipped with weapons (Iron Patriot): Nanotechnology enhancement Superhuman strength and durability Supersonic flight Energy repulsor and missile projection Regenerative life support (Master of Psionics): Demonic transformation Vastly enhanced psionic powers Telepathy; Neural Jumpstart; Mass mind control Psi-energy materialization Immobilization

Mentallo (Marvin Flumm) is a character appearing in American comic books published by Marvel Comics. After being fired from S.H.I.E.L.D. for attempting a covert takeover, he has since operated as both a freelance criminal and subversive, and a high-ranking agent of Hydra. Mentallo is a mutant with low-level psychic powers and is usually depicted as using technology to increase his power.

== Publication history ==
Mentallo first appeared in Strange Tales #141 (Feb. 1966) and was created by Stan Lee and Jack Kirby.

== Fictional character biography ==
Marvin Flumm was born in Watford City, North Dakota. He once worked as a shoe salesman. As a mutant telepath of moderate ability, Mentallo is recruited by S.H.I.E.L.D. as a candidate for their ESP Division. However, he works with the Fixer in an attempt to take over S.H.I.E.L.D., clashing with Nick Fury for the first time. He then serves as a division leader in a splinter group of Hydra led by Silvermane.

As the Think Tank, he is a member of the Resistants which was originally an incarnation of the Brotherhood of Mutants. The Resistants oppose the Mutant Registration Act and battle Captain America. Think Tank is imprisoned and resumed his Mentallo identity.

Shortly after World War Hulk, Mentallo appears as a member of the Hood's crime syndicate. He remains with the group until they are defeated by the New Avengers.

Some time after, Mentallo is hired by MODOK to be part of a supervillain heist squad. Due to his psychic powers, Mentallo realizes that MODOK had created a psychic illusion of money to secure everyone's loyalty. MODOK secretly tells him that the "full extent" of the plans would be revealed to him and several other villains. Mentallo offers to betray MODOK's plans to the Avengers for cash, but is attacked by the Ultra-Adaptoid, who incinerates and nearly kills him to protect its cover.

During the Heroic Age storyline, Mentallo once again encounters the Avengers. He attempts to control Reptil's mind, but Reptil transformed into a dinosaur and resists Mentallo's control. Reptil is unable to control himself and badly injures Mentallo.

Mentallo psychically enslaves the monsters of Monster Island on behalf of the Roxxon Energy Corporation, who attempt to seize control of Monster Island to drill for oil. He is stopped and defeated by the X-Men after double-crossing Roxxon and attempts to flee with his professional fee of a billion dollars. While attempting to flee, one of the monsters drops a cargo hold directly on top of him.

Flumm later appears as the Minister of Public Affairs for the new High Council of A.I.M. He is able to split his focus between his physical self and a series of nanites which control sentient drones as the Iron Patriot.

After escaping confinement, Mentallo begins working with William Stryker, who has assumed a demonic form. Flumm trades his soul to Stryker for greater power. In exchange, he founds a cult of the wealthy elite as well as mutants and mutant affiliates to fund a fast trending movement of followers all brought under their flag through his bolstered mutant abilities as the Master of Psionics.

Mentallo is seen amongst a host of mutants, both heroes and villains, who are welcomed into Krakoa after it is established as a mutant nation.

== Powers and abilities ==
Marvin Flumm is a mutant with weak psychic powers which he has had augmented through scientific means throughout his criminal career, oftentimes being provided by the Fixer. Mentallo boasts telepathy able to read the thoughts of any human mind within an approximate five mile (8 km) radius. He has the ability to project "mental bolts" at opponents, create psionic screens to protect himself from psychological assault, control the bodies and minds of other sentients, communicate telepathically, cast mental illusions and psychically possess the bodies of others. Mentallo has difficulty focusing his powers on moving targets. He is unusually vulnerable to psionic attack unless he erects a mental screen. He is also mildly telekinetic, once shown floating off the ground and again when erecting an invisible barrier to deflect heavy rain from himself.

Mentallo also has the ability to send out mental probes to identify the shape and size of objects in his near vicinity, effectively acting as a radar-sense. He can even locate invisible and intangible objects this way. He has a limited ability to influence peoples emotions as well. As Think Tank, he rode within a small tread-propelled vehicle in which he sat, with his upper body and head still exposed. This tank unit was armed with a wide range of weapons — machine guns, metal grappler arms etc. — which he directly controlled with his telepathic ability and a special interface helmet.

In the services of A.I.M., Mentallo's abilities were further bolstered through nanotech, able to cast his consciousness between micro-machines and his own body for ranged technopathic effect.

As the Master of Psionics, Flumm is able to control thousands of people without any equipment, on top of shaping and manifesting psychic energy. His deal with William Stryker also gave him some demonic powers of his own, like taking on a more monstrous form that seemed to strengthen his physicality and psychic powers.

=== Equipment ===
Mentallo wears a modified S.H.I.E.L.D. battle-suit. He has used various weaponry, including conventional firearms, rocket-guns, and a "sonic whammer" which projects intense vibratory blasts. He usually wears headgear that augments his abilities. The Fixer's device created for him called the Psycho Helmet also protects him against telepathic feedback, background noise, and psionic assault from other telepaths. The Fixer has supplied him with "electronic masks" (or "servo-pods") which adhere to victims' faces and place them under Mentallo's control. The Fixer's "mentascope" enables Mentallo to use his psionic power to locate and attack victims from afar. Mentallo is capable of flight via the Fixer's "anti-grav propellant unit" or "flying discs" and has also used a tank that can bore through the ground.

== Other versions ==
=== House of M ===
An alternate universe version of Mentallo appears in House of M as a member of the Red Guard, a group based in Australia that serves Exodus.

=== Ultimate Marvel ===
An alternate universe version of Marvin Flumm appears in the Ultimate Marvel imprint. This version is an agent of S.H.I.E.L.D. After the Maker's nuclear attack on Washington, D.C. kills most of the political cabinet, Flumm takes advantage of the ensuing chaos to order the Ultimates' capture. Flumm is exposed as a traitor by Black Widow and subsequently fired from S.H.I.E.L.D.

Additionally, a separate incarnation of Mentallo appears in Miles Morales: Ultimate Spider-Man #9 as a prisoner of Toad, who utilizes him in an attempt to produce Mutant Growth Hormone before he is stopped by S.H.I.E.L.D.

== See also ==
- List of S.H.I.E.L.D. members
