= Amelia Voght =

Marvel Comics supervillain

Amelia C. Voght
- Amelia Voght as depicted in X-Men Legacy #225 (August 2009). Art by Philippe Briones

Publication information
- Publisher: Marvel Comics
- First appearance: Uncanny X-Men #300 (May 1993)
- Created by: Scott Lobdell; John Romita Jr.

In-story information
- Species: Human mutant
- Team affiliations: Acolytes; Genoshan Cabinet; S.W.O.R.D.
- Abilities: Mist transformation; Teleportation

Amelia C. Voght is a supervillain appearing in American comic books published by Marvel Comics. The character is most commonly associated with the X-Men franchise.

A mutant with the ability to turn her body into mist, Voght was a love interest of Professor X before he founded the X-Men. Unable to believe in his mission, she eventually joined Magneto's Acolytes, becoming a trusted lieutenant to him.

== Publication history ==
Amelia Voght was created by Scott Lobdell and John Romita Jr., and first appeared in Uncanny X-Men #300 (May 1993).

== Fictional character biography ==
Amelia Voght is a nurse who cared for Charles Xavier in Tibet after his legs were first injured. At first their relationship was professional, but it soon became romantic. After he and Voght return to the United States, Xavier develops a machine called Cerebro to track mutants, hoping to protect and educate them. Voght finds Xavier's plans and believes that Xavier was developing the machine to hunt down and exterminate mutants. She reveals herself as a mutant and attacks him, only to be stopped when Xavier reveals his own mutant powers. This incident strengthens Xavier and Voght's relationship, but they develop different stances on human-mutant interaction over time. Xavier wants co-existence with humans, while Voght believes that mutants should remain hidden.

=== Acolytes ===
Voght is recruited by Fabian Cortez into the Acolytes, followers of Magneto. As one of the older and more experienced mutants, Voght is given a position of seniority within the group, even though she does not agree with some of the Acolytes' more extreme policies. Voght eventually becomes disillusioned with the Acolytes' extremist stance and leaves the group, returning to her work as a nurse. Voght was one of the few mutants to retain their powers following the events of M-Day.

Voght later joins S.W.O.R.D. alongside other mutants who have teleportation powers as part of their transportation division.

== Powers and abilities ==
Amelia Voght is a mutant who can transform herself and others into vapor. This enables her to fly, become intangible, and teleport by traveling through the astral plane.

== In other media ==
- Amelia Voght appears in X-Men: The Animated Series, voiced by Sheila McCarthy in "Sanctuary" and Sally Cahill in "The Phalanx Covenant".
  - Voght appears in the X-Men '97 episode "Bright Eyes", voiced by Donna J. Fulks.
