= Rusty Collins =

Fictional superhero in Marvel Comics

Russell "Rusty" Collins Firefist

Publication information
- Publisher: Marvel Comics
- First appearance: X-Factor #1 (February 1986)
- Created by: Bob Layton; Jackson Guice

In-story information
- Alter ego: Russell "Rusty" Collins
- Species: Human mutant
- Team affiliations: Acolytes; Mutant Liberation Front; New Mutants; X-Terminators; X-Factor; United States Navy
- Notable aliases: Firefist
- Abilities: "Pyromorphing" (Pyric Form or Fiery Form); Pyrokinesis

Russell "Rusty" Collins, formerly known as Firefist, is a superhero appearing in American comic books published by Marvel Comics.

Firefist was portrayed in the 2018 film Deadpool 2 by Julian Dennison and Sala Baker.

== Publication history ==
Created by Bob Layton and Jackson Guice, Rusty Collins first appeared in X-Factor #1 (February 1986).

== Fictional character biography ==
Rusty Collins was born in Tulsa, Oklahoma. Raised by his uncle, Rusty joins the US Navy at sixteen years of age. His mutant power of pyrokinesis manifests itself violently, burning a woman. Rusty is arrested, but when a prison guard playfully threatens him with deadly harm, he bursts into flames again and escapes.

X-Factor is alerted and comes to Rusty's aid, helping him to control his powers. He comes to live with X-Factor, who are slowly gathering a small team of mutant wards. Rusty forms a relationship with Skids, a former Morlock.

For a time, they all live upon Ship, a sentient being in the form of a long, rectangular spacecraft larger than a skyscraper. Rusty and the X-Terminators help X-Factor when an old booby-trap activates, threatening Ship's brain with a gigantic bomb. Ultimately, the bomb explodes harmlessly above Manhattan.

=== "Inferno" ===
During the 1989 "Inferno" storyline, Skids and the other wards form the X-Terminators and team up with the New Mutants to help rescue mutant babies from N'astirh, who is using them to maintain a portal to Limbo. Rusty himself had gone back into custody at the Navy but willingly goes with the group when he realizes his younger friends, Leech and Artie Maddicks have been captured. At the conclusion of Inferno, with the children rescued from the demons, Rusty joins the New Mutants along with Skids, Rictor and Boom Boom.

Rusty and Skids help out when long time New Mutants member Danielle Moonstar loses control of her mystical powers. During the incident, they are separated from the rest of the group. Mystique's Freedom Force attacks them at Liberty Island. Part of this conflict involves the fate of the children Rusty helped rescue; he believes that Freedom Force had wrongfully taken them into custody.

Due to a fight with Nitro and Vulture, Rusty is brought back into the sights of Freedom Force. While attempting to escape, he is severely injured by Blob. While recovering in the hospital, he and Skids are contacted by members of the Mutant Liberation Front (MLF). With soldiers opening fire on them, they feel they have no other choice than to join the MLF.

=== Brainwashed ===
Shortly after, Rusty and Skids are brainwashed by Stryfe to serve him. During this, Rusty is part of an MLF strike team sent to a museum to steal an ancient artifact. Cable, who took over the New Mutants soon after Rusty left, attacks the group. He kills MLF member Sumo and attempts to kill the rest of the group, but only injures two of them in the arm, Rusty included. The Mutant Liberation Front are turned over to authorities.

Shortly after, Rusty and Skids are kidnapped by the Friends of Humanity. While being transported, the two are rescued by X-Force. Arriving back to their base, X-Force are confronted by Exodus, who has invited original New Mutants Cannonball and Sunspot to Avalon, a "safe haven" for selected mutants. Cannonball refuses to go unless all former New Mutants present (Boom Boom, Rictor, Rusty and Skids) are also invited. While Exodus complains that Rusty and Skids were "damaged" due to their brainwashing, he finally acquiesces.

Upon arriving at Avalon, the mutants are taken to "the Savior" (in reality Magneto), who used his powers to undo the brainwashing done to Rusty and Skids. When X-Force arrives to save their friends, Rusty and Skids decide to stay with Magneto and join his Acolytes, feeling that they owe him.

When the body of Holocaust, a "survivor" from the Age of Apocalypse, is discovered floating in space near Avalon, he is brought on board. Rusty is assigned to watch over Holocaust's body, only to be killed when he reawakens.

=== Return ===
Rusty is resurrected by means of the Transmode Virus to serve as part of Selene's army of deceased mutants. Under the control of Selene and Eli Bard, he takes part in the assault on the mutant nation of Utopia.

Rusty is resurrected via the resurrection protocols on Krakoa. He rejoins X-Factor, but is killed in their first outing.

== Powers and abilities ==
Rusty Collins is a mutant with the psionic ability of pyrokinesis. He can control and manipulate fire, as well as turn some or all of his body into flames. He is immune to the effects fire would otherwise normally have on his body.

== In other media ==
- A young Rusty Collins appears in the X-Men: The Animated Series episode "No Mutant is an Island", voiced by Amos Crawley. This version is an orphan living in Nebraska who has difficulty controlling his pyrokinetic powers until a telepathic mutant named Killgrave offers to help. After adopting him, Killgrave attempts to use Rusty, among other mutants, to become Nebraska's governor. However, he is foiled by Cyclops, who frees Rusty and the others from Killgrave's hypnotic brainwashing.
- Russell Collins / Firefist appears in Deadpool 2, portrayed by Julian Dennison as a teenager and Sala Baker as an adult. This version is a 14-year-old New Zealander who was tortured at the "Essex School" along with other mutant children. After killing his primary tormentor, the school's headmaster, he became fascinated with killing and went on to murder Cable's family in a post-apocalyptic future. When Cable travels back in time to kill a young Russell and avert his family's deaths, Deadpool is charged with protecting the boy and ensuring he does not become a killer.
