= Escaut =

Escaut may refer to:

- Scheldt River, Escaut in French
- MV Escaut, a number of ships with this name
- Escaut (department), the former French département

== See also ==
- Manon Lescaut (disambiguation)
