= Manan =

Manan may refer to:

== Given name ==
- Manan Ahmed Asif (born 1971), Pakistani-American historian
- Manan Chandra (born 1981), Indian snooker and pool player
- Manan Desai (born 1987), Indian actor and comedian
- Manan Hingrajia (born 1998), Indian cricketer
- Manan Sharma (born 1991), Indian cricketer from Delhi
- Manan Trivedi (born 1974), American physician and politician
- Manan Vohra (born 1993), Indian cricketer

== Surname ==
- Anuar Manan (born 1986), Malaysian cyclist
- Bagir Manan (born 1941), Indonesian jurist
- Dianette Henriette-Manan, Mauritian politician
- K. K. Manan (fl. 2000s–2010s), Indian jurist
- M. A. Manan (1930s–2009), Bangladesh politician
- Mian Abdul Manan, Pakistani politician
- Suryatati Abdul Manan (born 1953), Malay politician

== Places ==
- Mānān, a 10th-century town in the Kanem–Bornu Empire in central Africa
- Manan-gu, a district (gu) of Anyang, South Korea
- Manan, Kapurthala, a village in Punjab, India

== Other uses ==
- Manan (reflection), or manana, in Indian philosophy
- Manan, a fictional character in the novel The Tombs of Atuan

== See also ==
- Kot Manan, a village in Punjab, Pakistan
- Grand Manan, an island of Canada
- Mannan (disambiguation)
- Manon (disambiguation)
- Manen (disambiguation)
