= Manen =

Manen may refer to:

- Man'en, a Japanese era
- Manen (Ede), a former town in Gelderland, the Netherlands, now part of Ede
- Christian Manen (1934–2020), French composer and music teacher
- Juan Manén (1883 –1971), Spanish violinist and composer
- Martí Manen (born 1976), Spanish art curator

== See also ==
- Van Manen, a Dutch surname (including a list of people with the name)
- Mannen, a mountain in Norway
- Manan (disambiguation)
