= Mannon =

Mannon may refer to:

- Mannon, Illinois, unincorporated community
- Cliff Mannon (born 1970), American handball goalkeeper and Olympian
- James Mannon (born 1942), American professor of sociology
- Wilson Mannon (1928–1992), American murder victim; see Murder of Wilson Mannon
- Ezra, Christine, Lavinia and Orin Mannon, characters in Eugene O'Neil's 1931 play Mourning Becomes Electra

== See also ==
- Manon (disambiguation)
- Mannan (disambiguation)
- Mannen, a Norwegian mountain
- Mannone
