= Tabitha Smith =

Marvel Comics superhero

Tabitha Smith Boom-Boom
- Tabitha Smith taken from the cover to Weapon X #11. Art by Georges Jeanty.

Publication information
- Publisher: Marvel Comics
- First appearance: Secret Wars II #5 (Nov. 1985)
- Created by: Jim Shooter (writer); Al Milgrom (artist)

In-story information
- Full name: Tabitha Smith
- Species: Human mutant
- Team affiliations: Fallen Angels; X-Terminators; New Mutants; Underground; X-Force; Nextwave; X-Men
- Notable aliases: Time Bomb; Boom-Boom; Boomer; Meltdown; Firecracker; Mutate #35
- Abilities: Ability to create variably-sized yellow orbs of pure mental energy that explode with concussive and destructive force

Tabitha Smith is a superhero appearing in American comic books published by Marvel Comics, commonly in association with The X-Men and related titles. Created by Jim Shooter and Al Milgrom, the character first appeared in Secret Wars II #5 (Nov. 1985). She then appeared as a member of X-Force and later as a member of Nextwave.

Tabitha is mentally able to create variably-sized yellow orbs of pure energy that explode with concussive and destructive force. Since her first appearance, she has used a number of different codenames, including Time Bomb, Boom-Boom, Boomer, and Meltdown.

== Publication history ==
Created by Jim Shooter and Al Milgrom, the character first appeared in Secret Wars II #5 (Nov. 1985), in which she and the Beyonder are the primary characters. She next appears as a main character in the 1987 limited series Fallen Angels. This led to her becoming a supporting character in the X-Factor series beginning with issue #11, which then led to a co-star role in the X-Terminators limited series. Following this series, she appeared in The New Mutants, initially guest-starring as a member of the X-Terminators, and eventually becoming a member of the titular group.

The team then became X-Force and she remained a member of the team for most of the X-Force series. Sometime later, she appears as a member of Nextwave throughout the Nextwave series. Writer Warren Ellis said that he picked Boom-Boom to be in Nextwave because Boom-Boom is his favorite superhero name in the history of comics for its sheer oddness and silliness, and he loved it when she was in Uncanny X-Men when Joe Madureira was the artist.

"I wanted a character who could blow things up," he said of his choice of Boom-Boom. "I was also looking for a team structure where the women outnumbered the men. I liked her white-trash criminal background, which had uses in the plot set-up. But mostly I wanted a character who could blow things up. I mean, these are characters who no-one at Marvel had any use for, and I could have been stopped at any time, Jen. But a skinny-ass blonde mutant with a kleptomaniac streak had both plot and entertainment value to me. Especially when played against the others."

== Fictional character biography ==
=== Early life ===
Tabitha Smith was born in Roanoke, Virginia and is depicted as a rebellious but normal teenager, and the daughter of divorced parents, in her first appearance. Her mutant powers manifest at age 13, and her parents immediately show their disgust, with her father even beating her. Running away from home, she gives herself the alias "Time Bomb" and meets the cosmic entity known as the Beyonder. He takes her to Charles Xavier, headmaster of the School for Gifted Youngsters, who ignores her to combat the Beyonder.

=== Fallen Angels and X-Terminators ===
Living on the streets, Tabitha becomes involved with Maurice "Tiger" Antonini and, after he threatens her and murders her friend Gina, she uses her powers to kill him. Vanisher recruits her for his band of thieves, called the Fallen Angels, and she officially takes on the codename "Boom-Boom." She eventually betrays the Vanisher, calling in the help of X-Factor, with whom she stays afterward.

=== New Mutants ===
Cover to X-Force #51, featuring the revamped Tabitha Smith. Art by Adam Pollina.

After working with the New Mutants, Tabitha and some members of the X-Terminators, Rusty Collins, Skids, and Rictor, join the group. The New Mutants team, under the continued tutelage of Cable, is reformed into X-Force. The team undergoes a revamp, employing new, more aggressive methods. During this time, Tabitha acts on her crush on Cannonball, and the two have a relationship. Although she questions the team's new methods, Tabitha sticks with the team, rechristening herself Boomer.

Following the attempted murder of Professor X, mutual distrust places X-Force in conflict with the X-Men and X-Factor, and X-Force is apprehended. Cannonball arranges for the team to be temporarily released so they can help take down the Mutant Liberation Front. Among the MLF are two of Boomer's former X-Terminators and New Mutants teammates, Rusty and Skids, who breaks Boomer's jaw. After X-Force's names are cleared, Tabitha is confronted by Cannonball's ex-girlfriend Lila Cheney, who gives the couple her blessing.

=== Peter Wisdom ===
In the meantime, the sudden power loss really hit home for Cannonball, as to just how little they had been doing lately to help mutant-kind. He got back in touch with Pete Wisdom, and together they devised a plan for reactivating X-Force as a covert strike team. Tabitha (now calling herself Meltdown), along with Warpath and Bedlam, utilize an abandoned Hulkbuster base in Nevada for training. Meltdown is taught to direct the explosive force of her power into streams of guided energy and is trained in computer hacking and manipulating digital information.

=== Weapon X and the X-Force mini ===
When Cable discovers hints regarding the existence of a revamped Weapon X program, one designed to use mutants to hunt down and intern other mutants, he creates an organization to investigate the program and the existence of its internment camp, Neverland. He dubs the organization "the Underground" and invites Meltdown to join his elite group. Ultimately, Cable's Underground group is joined by Weapon X agent Brent Jackson, who hopes to stage a coup against the project's director and has formed his own resistance group with fellow agents Washout, Marrow, Wild Child, and Sauron. Jackson betrays the Underground team after the coup is successful and alters/wipes their memories of the events.

=== Nextwave ===
Shortly afterward, after an initial period of wild arrogance, Tabitha mellows out and settles back into her earlier more bubbly personality, developing a tendency to use chat room-like shorthand when speaking out loud, such as "OMG," "ZOMG," and "OH NOES!". Tabitha grows her hair long, eschews her codename, and re-appears as a founding member of Nextwave.

=== Manifest Destiny ===
Tabitha moves to San Francisco to help with the X-Men's new relocation plans, and resumes using the codename Boom-Boom. While shopping in San Francisco, she confronts the mutant Nuwa. Forced by Beast to confront Nuwa through research, instead of strength alone, she discovers the true nature of Nuwa's sedation powers, then nullifies them by consuming large quantities of caffeine.

=== Kidnapping, death and salvation ===
Tabitha is later kidnapped, along with Surge and Hellion, by Leper Queen and the Sapien League. The Leper Queen attempts to inject her with a modified version of the Legacy Virus, a virus that had been cured years before and afflicted mostly mutants, when the members of X-Force arrive to try and save her. After Cyclops refuses to wait long enough for Wolverine and Domino to kill the Leper Queen, they are sent through time to help Cable, leaving the Leper Queen and Tabitha alone.

=== All-New X-Men ===
Tabitha later appeared in All-New X-Men as a member of the Utopians alongside Elixir, Karma, Madison Jeffries, Masque, and Random, taking down unwanted visitors such as S.H.I.E.L.D.'s investigation team as they sought quiet refuge in the island ruins. S.H.I.E.L.D. asked X-Men for help on the issue, and after a brief fight and discussion, both teams came to an agreement and Tabitha's crew was relocated to New Charles Xavier School.

=== Krakoan Age ===
Tabitha joined the mutant nation of Krakoa. She assisted the New Mutants during this time, rescuing Armor and allies from an ambushed cartel hostage situation. and going on a rescue mission for Natashia Repina, a young mutant who lost control of her powers. She also assisted the All-New X-Terminators during this time.

=== After Krakoa ===
After the fall of Krakoa, Boom-Boom joined teams such as the New Hellions, and Cable's Inglorious X-Force.

== Powers and abilities ==
Tabitha Smith possesses the ability to create variably-sized yellow orbs and spheres of pure plasma, fiery-like energy, which she calls her "time bombs." These "time bombs" explode with concussive force. She can produce marble-sized energized "bombs" which have little concussive impact and which she uses for playing pranks. She has produced "time bombs" ranging up to the size of beach balls, which are able to destroy durable objects, including Predator X and Nimrod. Tabitha can also control the amount of time before detonation. Finally, she can mentally muffle the sound of the detonation. Under the direction of Pete Wisdom, she learns to focus her power as streams of concussive force. Tabitha normally produces spheres from her hands, but has shown to be able to manifest them elsewhere on her body.

== Reception ==
=== Accolades ===
- In 2014, Entertainment Weekly ranked Tabitha Smith 87th in their "Let's rank every X-Man ever" list.
- In 2018, CBR.com ranked Tabitha Smith 18th in their "X-Force: 20 Powerful Members Ranked From Weakest To Strongest" list.
- In 2020, Scary Mommy included Tabitha Smith in their "Looking For A Role Model? These 195+ Marvel Female Characters Are Truly Heroic" list.
- In 2021, Screen Rant included Tabitha Smith in their "10 Most Powerful Members Of The New Mutants" list.
- In 2022, CBR.com ranked Tabitha Smith 1st in their "10 Best X-Men Mutants Who Haven't Been In A Movie Yet" list, 9th in their "Every Member Of The New Mutants, Ranked By Growth" list and 9th in their "10 Marvel Mutants We Want To See In The MCU's Phase 5" list.

== Other versions ==
Alternate universe versions of Tabitha Smith appear in House of M, Marvel Zombies vs. The Army of Darkness,, Rahne of Terra, X-Men: The End, and Days of Future Past, among others.

== In other media ==
=== Television ===
- Tabitha Smith makes a non-speaking appearance in the X-Men: The Animated Series episode "No Mutant is an Island" as a child orphan who, among others, Zebediah Killgrave attempts to take advantage of until they are rescued by Cyclops.
  - Boom-Boom makes a non-speaking cameo appearance in the X-Men '97 episode "Remember It" as a resident of Genosha.
- Tabitha Smith / Boom-Boom appears in X-Men: Evolution, voiced by Megan Leitch. This version was forced by her father to commit crimes when she was younger until she became a student at the Xavier Institute and joins the X-Men's junior team, the New Mutants. However, her lack of discipline and mischievousness leads to her temporarily moving in with the Brotherhood of Bayville before Mystique evicts her. Additionally, Boom-Boom is best friends with fellow New Mutant Magma and displays a romantic interest in Nightcrawler.
- Tabitha Smith / Boom-Boom appears in the Wolverine and the X-Men episode "Hindsight, Part 1", voiced by Jennifer Hale.

=== Video games ===
- Tabitha Smith appears in Marvel Heroes, voiced by Kari Wahlgren.
- Tabitha Smith / Boomer appears in Marvel Cosmic Invasion, voiced by Aileen Mythen.

=== Miscellaneous ===
Tabitha Smith appears in the Wolverine versus Sabretooth motion comic, voiced by Kazumi Evans.

=== Merchandise ===
- Tabitha Smith / Boom-Boom received a figure in HeroClix's "Xplosion" series.
- Tabitha Smith / Boom-Boom, based on her Nextwave appearance, received a figure in HeroClix's Giant Size X-Men set.
- Tabitha Smith / Boom-Boom received a figure in HeroClix's "Deadpool and X-Force" box set.
- Tabitha Smith, based on her 1990s X-Force appearance, received a figure in the Marvel Minimates line.
- Tabitha Smith / Boom-Boom received a figure in the Marvel Legends toyline.
