= Rictor =

Marvel Comics fictional character

Julio Esteban "Ric" Richter Rictor
- Interior art of Excalibur #16 (December 2020); Art by Marcus To and Erick Arciniega

Publication information
- Publisher: Marvel Comics
- First appearance: X-Factor #17 (June 1987)
- Created by: Louise Simonson; Walt Simonson

In-story information
- Full name: Julio Esteban "Ric" Richter
- Species: Human mutant
- Team affiliations: X-Factor Investigations; Purifiers; X-Factor; X-Terminators; New Mutants; Weapon P.R.I.M.E.; X-Force; X-Corporation; Knights of X
- Abilities: Seismic energy generation

Rictor (Julio Esteban "Ric" Richter) is a superhero appearing in American comic books published by Marvel Comics, primarily in the X-Men family of books. The character was created by writer Louise Simonson and artist Walt Simonson and first appeared in X-Factor #17 (June 1987). In subsequent years, the character was featured as a member of the original New Mutants team and the original X-Force team, and continued to appear in various X-Men franchise publications thereafter. In comic books published in the 1980s and 1990s, Rictor's mutant powers were to generate and manipulate seismic energy and create tremendously powerful vibrations in any nearby object, inducing earthquake-like phenomena and causing objects to shatter or crumble. When the character was reintroduced in 2005, it was as one of many depowered mutants adjusting to civilian life. The character remained depowered until a 2011 comic.

Introduced in the late 1980s as a supporting character in X-Factor, Rictor appeared in Marvel comics for ten years under the pens of a number of different writers; much of his character development in this period came from Fabian Nicieza's run on X-Force. The character returned to publication in 2005 with the X-Factor vol.3 and has been written by Peter David continually since then. Responding to fan interest in the gay subtext surrounding the character in Jeph Loeb's X-Force run, Rictor's kiss with teammate Shatterstar in the pages of X-Factor vol.3 in 2009 became the first depiction of a same-sex kiss in a mainstream Marvel Comics publication. Since then, Rictor has been written as an out gay man who is fully accepting of his sexual identity, and one of the few gay superheroes in the Marvel Universe.

Rictor appeared in the 2017 film Logan, portrayed by Jason Genao.

== Publication history ==
Created by writer Louise Simonson and artist Walt Simonson, Rictor first appeared in X-Factor #17 (June 1987). X-Factor owed its early popularity to reuniting the five original main characters of The X-Men; new characters were introduced to the series over time, and Simonson's run introduced Mexican earth-manipulator Rictor as one of several young wards to the senior X-Men characters. In 1988, Simonson spun off these characters into their own miniseries X-Terminators before transferring most of them, including Rictor, to the cast of her other ongoing X-Men title The New Mutants during the "Inferno" crossover event. As part of the main cast of The New Mutants, Rictor also appeared in the crossover events "Days of Future Present" and "X-Tinction Agenda".

Rictor was written out of The New Mutants in issue #98 (February 1991), when artist Rob Liefeld took over plotting for the series after Simonson's departure. Under Liefeld's creative direction, the series was ended with issue #100 and relaunched as X-Force, with substantial changes in team lineup and a new high-octane and gritty tone. Rictor reappeared in X-Force #11, Liefeld's final issue on the series; dialogue scripter Fabian Nicieza subsequently took over full writing duties on the series and had Rictor join X-Force in issue #15 (October 1992).

During his time on X-Force, Rictor also appeared in the crossover stories "X-Cutioner's Song", "Fatal Attractions", "Child's Play" and "Phalanx Covenant", and guest-starred in the Cable series. Rictor remained a main character on X-Force for the duration of Nicieza's run on the series, up to the "Age of Apocalypse" event. Afterwards, Rictor left the team when Jeph Loeb took over as writer in issue #44 (July 1995); Loeb later brought Rictor back in issue #59 (October 1996). The character would remain on the team until issue #70 (October 1997), afterwards reappearing in issue #76 and the 1999 annual.

Rictor would develop a close bond with his X-Force teammate Shatterstar, who had first appeared in The New Mutants #99. From the beginning of Jeph Loeb's run as writer, the characters' relationship was deliberately coded as romantic. However, Loeb's intention to write the characters into a relationship was not followed-up by his successors upon departing the series, and the romantic connection between them was not made explicit.

In 2002, the character returned in the pages of New X-Men as a member of Professor Xavier's X-Corporation. Following the House of M crossover storyline in 2005, which saw the character lose his mutant abilities, Rictor returned to the X-Factor title with Peter David's third volume of the title. X-Factor vol. 3 began with Rictor extremely depressed and suicidal over the loss of his powers, joining as a civilian member of Multiple Man's team of superhero detectives, X-Factor Investigations. David's run would explore the character's romantic relationship with Wolfsbane (Rahne Sinclair), as first visited in the Liefeld run, and later made comic book history when the character was reunited with Shatterstar in X-Factor #45 (2009), which saw the two characters kiss. Storylines since, in the renumbered X-Factor #200 and onwards, have focused on the pair's explicitly romantic and sexual relationship. Marvel continued to depict Rictor as powerless until Avengers: The Children's Crusade #6 (2011), in which the Scarlet Witch restored his abilities.

In 2018, Rictor appeared as a main character in the miniseries New Mutants: Dead Souls and as a supporting character in the miniseries Shatterstar.

== Fictional character biography ==
=== Origins: X-Factor and New Mutants (1980s) ===
In his introductory story in X-Factor #17, Rictor is a captive of the anti-mutant organization called the Right, who connect him to a machine that amplifies his already uncontrollable power of earthquake generation to wreak havoc in San Francisco. Rictor is freed by X-Factor and accepted by them as a trainee member. During the chaos, he is assisted by Boom Boom, who talks him out of a severe emotional crisis. He becomes emotionally attached to her as a result, later describing her as "like a sister". He is recaptured by the Right shortly afterwards, but is again freed by X-Factor.

Rictor and his friends take up residence on X-Factor's base, the sentient craft named 'Ship'. When X-Factor wards Artie Maddicks and Leech are kidnapped by N'astirh's demons, Rictor joins his fellow X-Factor trainees in a mission to rescue them. During the mission, they adopt the name X-Terminators. Following two successful team-ups with the New Mutants, Rictor and Boom Boom both join the group.

Rictor develops romantic feelings for Wolfsbane while on the team. Rictor and friends travel to Asgard and battle Hela, where he assumes a protective role over her, even helping her pass by Garm. Rictor is chagrined when Cable, who he mistakes for the man who killed his father, steps in as mentor of the New Mutants. He initially rebels against Cable's authority, but acquires some respect for him when he spies him practicing in the Danger Room by himself. Alongside the New Mutants, he assists Cable in fighting Stryfe and the Mutant Liberation Front.

Rictor is captured alongside Storm, Boom Boom, Wolfsbane, and Warlock by forces of the island nation Genosha. Only he and Boom Boom escape. They spend nearly a full day as fugitives on the streets of Genosha's capital until being reunited with the X-Men, X-Factor, and New Mutants. Rictor shares a heartfelt kiss with Wolfsbane and is heartbroken when she chooses to stay behind.

Rictor leaves the New Mutants with the intent to bring Wolfsbane back from Genosha. Rictor is by then convinced that Cable—from whom Stryfe had been cloned—is the man who killed his father, and he agrees to join the Canadian government's Weapon P.R.I.M.E. team. The team's sole purpose is the apprehension of Cable, but thanks to both Cable and the New Mutants now known as X-Force, this is averted.

=== X-Force (1990s; 2002) ===
Rictor joins X-Force, and aids them in saving Sunspot from Gideon. When Stryfe, posing as Cable, shoots Professor X, X-Force is hunted by the X-Men and X-Factor. Wolfsbane has since joined X-Factor. She disbelieves Rictor when he says he does not know where Cable is, and shows no hesitation in apprehending him personally, driving a further wedge between the two. X-Force are held captive in the X-Mansion, before being officially released after Cable is cleared of blame in Professor X's shooting. Afterwards, the team sets up its base in the ruins of Camp Verde, Warpath's home reservation.

Although Shatterstar initially irritates Rictor, the two become close friends over time. When his cousin and uncle are shot during an arms deal, Rictor visits his family in Guadalajara for the first time in years and is accompanied by Shatterstar; this story shows scenes from young Rictor's childhood, showing how he was forced to watch his father, a black-market arms merchant, being killed by Stryfe. The same story also shows how Shatterstar has learned Spanish to communicate with Rictor privately. The characters' close relationship is also shown in another story where Rictor takes Shatterstar to a nightclub to try and help him better understand humanity.

Rictor leaves X-Force when the team relocates to the Xavier Mansion and begins using more intrusive telepathic communication, choosing to return to his family. He comes back to the team when Shatterstar undergoes an identity crisis. When the team disbands in the wake of Operation: Zero Tolerance, Rictor and Shatterstar depart for Mexico together to try to systematically take down Rictor's family's arms-dealing business. During their time together, Rictor learns Shatterstar's native language from his home planet of Mojoworld. After having made significant progress against the Richter family, the pair briefly reunite with X-Force when they are caught up in an incident involving genetic experiments on mutants. The ultimate outcome of their campaign against Rictor's family is not shown, but can be assumed to be successful.

Rictor next appeared in two issues of New X-Men in 2002. These issues reveal Rictor is one of several mutants (amongst them other former members of X-Force) who joined Professor X's restructured X-Corporation. X-Corporation's confrontation with Weapon XII is a catastrophe, leading to the death of one of their members, Darkstar.

=== X-Factor Investigations (2005–2013) ===
==== Powerless detective ====
In 2005, Marvel launched the X-Men-centric crossover limited series House of M. That storyline's climax brought a new status quo the Marvel universe, wherein most mutant characters on the planets suddenly lost their powers; stories following this so-called 'M-day' were continued under the bannerhead Decimation. Rictor is one of many mutants who lost their powers. His Decimation narrative thread was started in the relaunch of X-Factor v.3. This series marks the first time Rictor had a starring role in eight years. In the first issue of X-Factor, Rictor once again attempts suicide but is overcome by confusion and doubt. A rogue duplicate of Jamie Madrox nearly kills him but his life is saved by Monet St. Croix, a former member of Generation X. After some convincing from Monet and a gentle nudge from Layla Miller, he joins X-Factor Investigations under the employ of Jamie Madrox, the Multiple Man. He also finds Siryn after she has been attacked and kidnapped and becomes extremely mistrustful of Layla Miller.

Marvel's 2006–2007 Civil War storyline would crossover into X-Factor. When the Superhuman Registration Act is introduced, Rictor and Monet sign up willingly but side with the rest of X-Factor against the pro-registration heroes.

Continuing the storyline from House of M follow-up series Son of M, Quicksilver features in X-Factor for a time. In that series, Quicksilver goes to desperate lengths to reacquire his lost mutant powers, and acquires an ability to restore the powers of other former mutants. Rictor visits Quicksilver, who takes an interest in Rictor being depowered and discusses the possibility of getting his powers back. When Madrox brings Pietro up, Rictor jokes about having had a sexual relationship with him. Madrox then makes a joking comment about making Shatterstar jealous, causing Rictor to become flustered.

Quicksilver later manipulates Rictor, empowering him, in a plan to give other ex-mutants their powers. Unfortunately the process is unstable and several of these ex-mutants explode. Rictor confronts Quicksilver again, ending up with Rictor apparently depowered one more time and the mutagenic Terrigen Crystals in Quicksilver's body destroyed. Afterwards, Wolfsbane and a distraught Rictor share a sexual encounter, but this new aspect of their relationship is marred by multiple arguments. During that time Rictor had several Terrigen Crystals embedded in his back (the remnants from the exploding crystals from Quicksilver), which helped him to defeat Isolationist.

During the X-Men: Messiah Complex crossover storyline, Rictor is asked to infiltrate the Purifiers, as he is still depowered. In an effort to gain the trust of the Purifiers, he, as planned with X-Men, saves them from an attack from Wolfsbane. Rictor then informs the X-Men that the Purifiers' base extends beyond New York and all over America. He also catches the New X-Men sneaking around in the Purifier base and when they are ambushed by the Reavers, he helps Pixie to focus while using a teleportation spell.

As part of the X-Men: Divided We Stand crossover storyline, while walking down the street, he sees a prostitute who looks just like Layla. When he tries to follow her thinking she is Layla, he gets into a fight with an ex-mutant with horns in his head. He kicks him in the crotch and eventually gets into a fight with the prostitute's pimps until Strong Guy steps in. He is later escorted to the hospital where he learns that a lot of fights have been breaking out around Mutant Town. He is the last to learn that Rahne has left and ends up captured by Arcade when he tries to leave X-Factor. He eventually frees himself and finds that the person who hired Arcade is Taylor, the Purifier who he tricked into letting him into their organization. He later relocates with the rest of X-Factor to Detroit.

Scarlet Witch restores Rictor's powers

In the pages of X-Factor vol. 3, after finding out a dupe of Madrox's has been living in New England as a priest, Rictor and Strong Guy take a road trip to visit him, hoping to find out where Madrox had disappeared to. While traveling, Rictor brushes off Strong Guy's questions of his mental state, but acknowledges his reaction to Madrox's absorption of his baby may not have been the greatest. The two question Father Maddox on Jamie's disappearance, but in the middle of this, a masked man crashes through the window, swords pointed toward Rictor. Strong Guy manages to grab the attacker and pull off his mask before being thrown out the window, revealing the masked man to be a possessed Shatterstar. After a brief fight, Shatterstar is broken out of his trance-like state. Upon recognizing Rictor, the two grab one another and finally share a kiss.

==== Powers restored ====
In the 2010–2011 miniseries Avengers: The Children's Crusade, a fully restored Scarlet Witch, who had been responsible for the original M-Day, restores the powers of several mutants, including Rictor.

Rictor later becomes a citizen of Krakoa after it is established as a sovereign mutant nation and studies under Apocalypse to hone his abilities.

He is killed during the X of Swords event, but resurrected by the Five soon after.

== Powers and abilities ==
Rictor is a mutant capable of generating and manipulating seismic energy and creating tremendously powerful waves of vibrations in any nearby object, causing objects to shatter or crumble. When used against objects with a larger surface, the effects are much like an earthquake. Rictor's powers appear to affect organic objects in much the same way as inorganic ones; he is depicted using them to explode a cactus plant in X-Force #25. Rictor himself is immune to the harmful effects of the vibrations he creates. He has expressed reluctance to use his powers in tectonically unstable areas, for fear that he could not control the effects, as when he visited the island of Madripoor, which is located in the Pacific Ring of Fire, in New Mutants #93 (September 1990). In New X-Men #130 Jean Grey also states that Rictor has some kind of telepathic defense against Weapon XII's infestation. In issue #1 of the 2005 relaunch of X-Factor, he is depicted as suicidal, lamenting that he has lost his powers and connection to the earth.

During the 2005–2011 period when Rictor was powerless, he worked as a detective using his skill in computers. In one storyline during this period, Rictor briefly had Terrigen Crystals embedded in his back. In a confrontation with the Isolationist, Rictor was shown to be immune or resistant to the various powers the Isolationist manifested because of these crystals. Physical contact with Rictor reversed the villain's Colossus-like transformation, a direct assault with Cyclops-like optic blasts had no effect, and an ice construct melted around Rictor. According to writer Peter David, these crystals burnt out subsequently.

== Reception ==
- In 2014, Entertainment Weekly ranked Rictor 43rd in their "Let's rank every X-Man ever" list.
- In 2018, Comic Book Resources (CBR) ranked Rictor 17th in their "20 Most Powerful Mutants From The '80s" list.
- In 2018, CBR ranked Rictor 19th in their "X-Force: 20 Powerful Members" list.

== Sexual orientation ==
Rictor and Shatterstar kiss. Art by Marco Santucci.

In early comics featuring Rictor and Shatterstar together (most notably Jeph Loeb's X-Force), there was a persistent subtext that the two were in a relationship together. Over the 1990s, Rictor certainly developed a close—and somewhat ambiguous—relationship with Shatterstar. Although Shatterstar was introduced by creator Rob Liefeld as an asexual killing machine, writer Peter David reflected that the character's "prolonged exposure to humanity" changed this. X-Force writer Jeph Loeb hinted that Shatterstar had romantic feelings for Rictor and was planning on making the two a couple, but he left the title before this could happen. Though the romantic subtext between the characters was never quite explicit in Loeb's series, fans nevertheless picked up on it. Over the course of the characters' appearances, Rictor and Shatterstar's relationship would evolve from a subtext in 1990s X-Force comics to Marvel naming them one of the company's top ten supercouples in 2010. In 2011, David won a GLAAD Award for the portrayal of Rictor and Shatterstar's relationship in X-Factor.

In 2007, a joke in Peter David's X-Factor v. 3 #14 features Rictor insinuating to Madrox that he and Quicksilver might have been romantically or sexually intimate, which he later denies only on account of Quicksilver being "evil". This was the first explicit hint of Rictor's ambiguous sexuality. With regards to this scene, as the writer continued to develop Rictor's personal relationships, David expressed the idea that:

[It is] more fun tweaking the fans than actually spelling anything out ... I think it's much more interesting to have Rictor's comments be a litmus test for the agenda of the readers than if you just show him involved in some sort of bisexual relationship.

Although creator Louise Simonson did not conceive of the character as being gay or indeed non-heterosexual, canonically, Rictor has had romances with men and women. In X-Factor v. 3, under the pen of Peter David, Rictor dated both Rahne Sinclair (Wolfsbane) and Tabitha Smith (Boom Boom). Although in X-Factor #21 in 2007, Rictor had begun a sexual relationship with Rahne, she later left the team "under abrupt circumstances" because editorial had decided to move the character to another book. This created an opening for David to bring back Shatterstar. David was drawn to revisit Loeb's unresolved Rictor-Shatterstar romance because of fans' requests for Shatterstar to return "and to see Rictor and Shatterstar pick up where they left off." David remarked that it was the storyline he got the most requests to write. Because neither character is a "household name", David was given more freedom by Marvel to interpret the characters and write the storyline as he wished; there was no trouble getting the storyline approved. David wrote Rictor's embrace of his love for Shatterstar as a maturation for the character, whom he sees "fully committed to the gay lifestyle... honest about it both with others and himself."

In X-Factor #45, in 2009, Rictor kissed Shatterstar. The two characters' first on-panel kiss became the first male-male kiss between two mainstream male superheroes in mainstream Marvel comic book history. X-Factor editor Jody Leheup knew that the kiss would make "a cool moment for the fans" but stated it had not occurred to him that it would be such an important scene to gay and straight comic fans. He also remarked on the need to not over-hype the scene as he and David "really want[ed] things like this to be seen as normal." David felt this was an interesting direction to take Rictor in, which particularly allowed the character—currently, emotionally vulnerable—to deal with the abruptness of Rahne's departure without having to have Rictor so much as break the fourth wall and resign himself to Rahne being in another book. Shortly after X-Factor v.3 #45, David confirmed Rictor's same-sex sexuality in his blog and expressed his desire to develop the relationship between Rictor and Shatterstar further. In X-Factor #210 (2010), Rictor seems to suggest he has always known deep down that he was gay and closeted. Explaining Rictor's prior straight relationships, David compared him to real-life "women who eventually decided they were lesbians had involvements with men that they ultimately considered unfulfilling."

For David, the relationship opened up other avenues for character development in the series. For example, he was able to explore Strong Guy's "liberal hypocrisy": his socially liberal personal values alongside his discomfort around gay people, in that character's reaction. David expressed that he does not want the relationship to become boring by having no problems. However, he wishes to avoid killing off either character; he opines that both characters are too well-established to fall into the pattern of killing off the more minor character to elicit angst in the more major one. One major facet of the relationship is that this is Shatterstar's first real relationship, meaning the two men may want different things. As David saw it, newly out bisexual Shatterstar is "like a kid in a candy store", whereas Rictor is ready to fully commit. David felt that these issues are interesting because they are new to superhero comic books; he does note, however, that the view he brings to the characters comes from the perspective of a heterosexual writer and his own personal experiences, and may not be the same as that of a gay writer.

== In other media ==
=== Television ===
Rictor makes a non-speaking cameo appearance in the X-Men: The Animated Series episode "Slave Island".

=== Film ===
A teenage Julio Richter / Rictor appears in Logan, portrayed by Jason Genao.
