= Mannan =

Mannan may refer to:

- Mannan (polysaccharide), a type of carbohydrate
- Mannan people, a social group of India
- Mannan language, a language of India
- Mannan (film), a 1992 Indian film
- Manannán, known in Manx as Mannan, a figure in Gaelic mythology

== People with the name ==
=== As a given name ===
- Mannan Hira (1956–2020), Bangladeshi dramatist and filmmaker
- Mannan Shaah (born 1987), Indian film music director, singer and composer

=== As a surname ===
- Khandaker Abdul Mannan, Bangladesh Freedom Party politician and the former Member of Parliament
- Gazi Alimuddin Mannan (1930–1990), Bangladeshi dancer and choreographer
- Hasina Mannan (born 1947), Bangladesh Awami League politician and the former Member of Parliament
- M. A. Mannan, Bangladesh Nationalist Party politician, first mayor of Gazipur City Corporation and former religious affairs minister
- M. Sam Mannan (1954–2018), American chemical engineer
- Masud Mannan (born 1961), Bangladeshi diplomat
- Muhammad Abdul Mannan (born 1946), Bangladeshi politician, diplomat and bureaucrat and the incumbent Minister of Planning of Bangladesh
- Rowshan Ara Mannan (born 1948), Bangladesh Jatiya Party politician
- Shamin Mannan (born 1995), Indian actress
- Sheikh Abdul Mannan (died 1971), Bangladeshi journalist
- Xulhaz Mannan (1976–2016), Bangladeshi LGBTQ+ rights activist

== See also ==
- Manan (disambiguation)
- Mannon (disambiguation)
- Mannen, a mountain in Norway
