= Manon (disambiguation) =

Manon is an opera by Jules Massenet, adapted from Abbé Prévost's novel Manon Lescaut.

Manon may also refer to:

== Fiction and art ==
=== Prévost's character ===
- Manon Lescaut, the eponymous character of the 1731 novel Manon Lescaut by French author Abbé Prévost
- Le portrait de Manon (1894), an opera by Massenet, a sequel to Manon
- Manon (1949 film), a French film by Henri-Georges Clouzot, adapted from Manon Lescaut
- Manon 70, a 1968 French film based on Manon Lescaut
- L'histoire de Manon, a 1974 ballet set to the music of Massenet, with choreography by Sir Kenneth MacMillan
- Manon (1981 film), a Japanese drama film based on Manon Lescaut

=== Other characters ===
- Manon (character), a fictional character from children's books, and related media, by Gerard Moncomble and Nadine Rouviere
- Manon, the fictional title character of the 1962 novel Manon des sources, by Marcel Pagnol, and subsequent adaptations
  - Manon des Sources (1986 film), a French film, released in North America as Manon of the Spring
- Manon, the fictional godlike deity ascribed to Wicca in the film The Craft
- Manon Blackbeak Crochan, a fictional character in the series Throne of Glass by Sarah J Maas
- Manon, a fictional French ballerina, judoka champion, and celebrity introduced in Street Fighter 6
- Manon, a Marvel Comics mutant character

== People ==
- Manon Bannerman (born 2002), Swiss singer and model
- Gloria Manon (born 1939), American actress
- Manon (artist) (born Rosmarie Küng 1946), Swiss artist
- Christian Manon (born 1950), French-Australian actor
- Julio Mañón (born 1973), Dominican baseball pitcher
- Lydia Manon (born 1982), American figure skater
- Víctor Mañón (born 1992), Mexican football player
- Manon (given name), including a list of people with the name

== Places ==
- Mañón, a city council of Ferrolterra in the province of A Coruña, Spain
- Sor Mañón, a river in Galicia, Spain

== See also ==
- Manon Lescaut (disambiguation)
- Mannon (disambiguation)
- Manan (disambiguation)
