= Inferno (Marvel Comics) =

1989 Marvel Comics company-wide crossover

- Cover to The Uncanny X-Men # 240 (Jan 1989), the storyline's first issue, by Marc Silvestri.
- Publisher: Marvel Comics
- Publication date: October 1988 – August 1989
- Genre: Superhero; Crossover
Title(s)
The Amazing Spider-Man #311-313
The Avengers vol. 1, #298-300
The Mutant Misadventures of Cloak and Dagger vol. 3, #4
Daredevil vol. 1, #262-263, #265
Damage Control vol. 1, #4
Excalibur vol. 1, #6-7
Fantastic Four vol. 1, #322-324
The New Mutants vol. 1, #71-73
Power Pack #42-44
The Spectacular Spider-Man vol. 1, #146-148
The Uncanny X-Men #239-243
Web of Spider-Man #47-48
What If...? vol. 2, #6
X-Factor vol. 1, #36-40 Annual #4
X-Terminators #1-4
- Main character: Madelyne Pryor; S'ym; N'Astirh; X-Men; X-Factor; New Mutants; X-Terminators; Mister Sinister
- X-Men: Inferno: ISBN 0-7851-0222-1

"Inferno" was a 1989 Marvel Comics company-wide crossover storyline centered upon the X-Men family of titles, including The Uncanny X-Men, X-Factor, X-Terminators, Excalibur, and The New Mutants. The story's inciting incident is demonic invasion of New York City, and its main character arcs were the corruption of Madelyne Pryor into the Goblin Queen, and the final transformation of Illyana Rasputin into the Darkchylde. Other non-X-Men books that tied into the storyline included the Spider-Man titles, which depicted the demonic transformation of the villain Jason Macendale (a.k.a. the Hobgoblin). The core series were written by Louise Simonson, and Chris Claremont, and drawn by Bret Blevins, Marc Silvestri, and Walt Simonson, while the various tie-in books were handled by creators that included Alan Davis, Steve Engelhart, Gerry Conway, David Michelinie, Ann Nocenti, Walter Simonson, Jon Bogdanove, Terry Austin, and Julianna Jones.

== Plot ==
Two demons from Limbo, S'ym and N'astirh, plan a demonic invasion of Earth. Their plan revolves around Magik of the New Mutants, as her mutant power allows her to open passages between Limbo and Earth. During one of the New Mutants' routine stopovers in Limbo, N'astirh casts a spell blocking Magik's teleportation power, thus trapping the New Mutants in Limbo with S'ym, who has taken control of Limbo's hordes and is eager to kill the New Mutants in order to solidify his claim to Limbo. Magik assumes that the entrapment spell was cast by S'ym, and so sees no reason to distrust N'astirh when he advises her that she can return to Earth by embracing her demonic power. She does so and opens a gateway to Manhattan. N'astirh had kidnapped Wiz Kid of the X-Terminators and coerced him into building a spell-casting computer; once Magik opened the gateway, he uses this computer to cast a spell holding it open.

Manhattan falls under siege, and the Avengers, Fantastic Four, Daredevil, Power Pack, and Spider-Man fend off numerous demons, as well as Hobgoblin, now possessed by a demon, and the mutant-hating Bogeyman, transformed into a monster by N'astirh. Inanimate objects become demonically possessed and begin attacking and devouring people. As shown in Daredevil and The Uncanny X-Men, most residents of Manhattan treat the demonic invasion as a part of normal life in the city. Buses still run, under an all-volunteer force since the drivers had either been eaten or transformed into demons themselves. Subways function, and people ride them willingly, even though some only go into Hell. Stores still sell products. Helicopter tours run. Originally, Spider-Man thinks that the events are illusions caused by Mysterio, however this is proven false when Mysterio is arrested and the strangeness continues.

Meanwhile, N'astirh had made a bargain with Madelyne Pryor, agreeing to locate her son Nathan and manipulate the X-Men into killing the Marauders in exchange for her casting a spell that would make a permanent bridge between Earth and Limbo. To keep his end, N'astirh alters the X-Men's computer systems so that they can use them to locate the Marauders. Driven to bloodthirstiness by N'astirh's Inferno spell, the X-Men attack the Marauders' headquarters, gleefully killing most of them in the ensuing battle. Colossus remains unaffected by this spell, due to the protection of his organic steel armor. When he learns what happened to his sister Magik, he concludes that he can only free his fellow X-Men from Inferno's influence by saving her. In fulfillment of his other half of the bargain, N'astirh liberates Nathan from Mister Sinister's laboratory, where Madelyne learns that she is in fact a clone of Jean Grey created by Sinister.

With their plan fulfilled, N'astirh and S'ym begin fighting each other for leadership of Limbo's hordes (and by extension, rule of both Limbo and Earth). With S'ym gaining the upper hand, N'astirh makes a desperate bid for victory by letting himself be infected with the transmode virus. He then merges with Wiz Kid's spell-casting computer, exponentially increasing his magical powers and thus allowing him to bridge permanently between Limbo and Earth without Madelyne Pryor's help. Wiz Kid destroys the computer before N'astirh can make use of this power. The explosion reduces N'astirh to ashes, but he is immediately reconstituted by the transmode virus.

Finding Magik, Colossus is horrified to see that she has so completely given in to her demonic side that she is fully covered by her eldritch armor and has demonic horns, legs, and a tail. Ashamed at her brother's reaction, she flees into Limbo and decides to end the demonic invasion by assuming the rule of Limbo. Her teammate Wolfsbane persuades her against this, and she instead gives up her demonic powers by creating a massive stepping disc that banishes most of the demons back to Limbo, including S'ym, then throwing her Soulsword in after them to seal the portal shut. Afterwards, the New Mutants find a seven-year-old Magik inside the husk of her eldritch armor.

While Magik's actions banished all demons native to Limbo except for N'astirh, people and objects who had been demonically possessed remain uncured. N'astirh is destroyed by the combined efforts of the X-Men and X-Factor, but Madelyne Pryor maintains the Inferno spell and threatens to kill her son Nathan as a demonic sacrifice to open the gate between Earth and Limbo. She forcibly links herself to Jean Grey's mind and shows her Madelyne's entire life, including what she learned in Mister Sinister's laboratory. Meanwhile, the X-Men and X-Factor break through her defenses and rescue Nathan. In a fatal bid for revenge, Madelyne wills herself to die, attempting to take Jean with her. As Madelyne dies, the fragment of the Phoenix Force that first gave her life emerges and bids Jean to use its power to save herself. Jean does so, thus breaking Madelyne's mental hold on her. New York City returns to normal.

Due to their mind link, part of Madelyne's personality was transferred to Jean, and she becomes determined to get revenge on Mister Sinister, now seeing him as responsible for all her sufferings. The X-Men and X-Factor learn that he took over Xavier's School for Gifted Youngsters while its headmaster, Magneto, was occupied with the demonic invasion. Aware of their coming, Mister Sinister waits until they are inside the school and then sets off explosives that demolish the building. None of the X-Men or members of X-Factor are killed or injured by the explosion, and some are not even rendered unconscious. Cyclops blasts Sinister to a smolder. Before his death, Sinister reveals to Cyclops that he is responsible for relocating his orphanage to separate his brother and arranging his marriage to Madelyne.

Despite all of the destruction and death, many human survivors are convinced it was all a shared hallucination.

== Significant issues ==
- The Uncanny X-Men #239–243
- X-Factor #36–39, Annual #4 (aftermath)
- The New Mutants #71–73
- X-Terminators #1–4
- Excalibur #6–7
- The Avengers #298–300
- Daredevil #262–263, #265
- Power Pack #42–44
- Cloak and Dagger (vol. 3) #4
- Fantastic Four #322–324
- The Spectacular Spider-Man #146–148
- Web of Spider-Man #47–48
- The Amazing Spider-Man #311–313
- Damage Control #4 (frame story only)
- What If...? (vol. 2) #6 (alt version)

When collected into a trade paperback, only the portions from The Uncanny X-Men, X-Factor, and The New Mutants were included, and the latter storyline was presented separately from the first two.

== Background and creation ==
To avoid losing track of individual characters and plot threads in the story's large cast, editor Bob Harras maintained roughly 20 pages of timelines for how each character would develop over the course of "Inferno".

== Sequel ==
The 2008 miniseries, written by C. B. Cebulski, X-Infernus, and starring Magik, serves as a sequel to "Inferno".

A second sequel, "Fall of the New Mutants", centers around Project Purgatory, a government operation that took the mutant babies used to make the portal to Limbo, who were recovered alive and well, to make an Army-controlled base in Limbo, as well as trying to figure out how to activate the powers of the mutant babies. Four years later (though due to a time dilation effect between Earth and Limbo, 26 years passed for them) Project Purgatory's surviving soldiers and General Ulysses along with the new fully grown and powered surviving Inferno babies, return to Earth, apparently out to capture Magik.

A spiritual successor to Inferno began in December 2022 entitled "Dark Web", which follows Spider-Man and the X-Men teaming up to fight Ben Reilly and Madelyne Pryor as they attempt to bring Limbo to New York.

=== Project Purgatory/Inferno Babies members ===
- General Ulysses: A Marine Veteran, he is the commanding officer of Project Purgatory. A top-notch commander, with great battlefield and command skills that allowed him to lead his forces to survive stranded on their own in Hell for two decades. Notably also appears to have no cybernetic or demonic parts attached to his body, unlike nearly all of the non-mutant members of Project Purgatory. Killed by Elder Gods.
- Doc Noc: Grafted demonic right arm, possessing increased strength. The arm responds to ambient anger and can act against Doc Noc's will. Implied to have been killed by Cannonball.
- Face: Weaponized brain stem. Capable of emitting a highly destructive energy blast from his face. Due to the nature of his mutation, he is deaf, blind and mute. Bionic cranio-facial plate allows him to control his blasts.
- Scab: Forms durable armor plating when his blood is exposed to oxygen. Implied to have been killed by Cannonball.
- Trista: Speaks backwards, creating a neural trap, allowing her to control those who hear her. Implied to have been killed by Cypher.
- Shauna: Induces paralysis and drowsiness through contact with her leech-like hands; can also "taste" those she holds between her hands.
- Toko: Generates an impenetrable and immovable forcefield.
- Alex: Gelatinous form, capable of engulfing opponents and inhibiting their mutant powers. The composition of his body means he is resistant to injury.
- Bob: Blue-skinned, can create miniature duplicates from his blood cells.
- Russell: Possesses superhuman speed. Often seen wearing a helmet. Implied to have been killed by Cannonball.
- Loca: Possesses demonic and cybernetic body grafts. Adept tracker, capable of sensing and tasting ambient emotional pheromones. (Killed by Mirage)
- Timothy: Capable of generating thermo-chemical energy from organic exhausts on forearms. Killed by Face.
- Maw: Possesses multiple mouths, each with razor-sharp teeth. Killed by Face.

== "Secret Wars" (2015) ==
As part of the 2015 "Secret Wars" storyline, there was a mini-series called "Inferno." Its domain in Battleworld is known as Limbo.

== Other versions ==
In What if Cyclops had stayed with Madelyne Pryor, X-Factor saved Madelyne's life during Inferno, and Scott chooses to stay with her to help raise Nathan. To protect Scott's family, Jean wipes Mister Sinister's knowledge of her cloning and Nathan's birth from his memories. Scott and Madelyne raise Nathan with a normal childhood until he develops his powers. They become a crime-fighting family known as the House of X, and media coverage triggers Sinister's memories of them. Enraged and mistakenly believing Madelyne altered his mind, Sinister has his forces slaughter most of the X-Men, blind Scott, and kill Madelyne. Scott and Nathan lead X-Force in killing Sinister and his associates. Sinister's death and Hope Summers' absence causes the X-Men to lose the Tournament of Swords, leading to devastation and nuclear fallout that leaves Earth uninhabitable for thousands of years.

== Collected editions ==
Title	Material collected	Published date	ISBN
X-Men: Inferno Prologue Omnibus	X-Factor #27-32 and Annual #3, Uncanny X-Men #228-238, New Mutants #62-70 and Annual #4, X-Men Annual #12, and material from Marvel Age Annual #4 and Marvel Fanfare #40	December 2021	978-1302931360
X-Men: Inferno Vol. 1	Uncanny X-Men #239-240, X-Factor #33-36, X-Terminators #1-4, New Mutants #71-72 and X-Factor Annual #4	February 2016	978-0785195115
X-Men: Inferno Vol. 2	Uncanny X-Men #241-243, Excalibur #6-7, X-Factor #37-40, New Mutants #73, Mutant Misadventures of Cloak and Dagger #4, Power Pack #44	June 2016	978-0785195443
X-Men: Inferno Crossovers	Avengers #298-300; Fantastic Four #322-324; Amazing Spider-Man #311-313; Spectacular Spider-Man #146-148; Web of Spider-Man #47-48; Daredevil #262-263, 265	December 2016	978-0785195511
X-Men: Inferno Omnibus	X-Factor #33-40; X-Terminators #1-4; Uncanny X-Men #239-243; New Mutants #71-73; Power Pack #40, 42-44; Avengers #298-300; Fantastic Four #322-324; Amazing Spider-Man #311-313; Spectacular Spider-Man #146-148; Web of Spider-Man #47-48; Daredevil #262-263, 265; Excalibur #6-7; Mutant Misadventures of Cloak and Dagger #4, material from X-Factor Annual #4	March 2021	978-1302928544
Inferno: Warzones!	Inferno #1-5	December 2015	978-0785198734

== In other media ==
A greatly condensed adaptation of "Inferno" is featured in the X-Men '97 episode "Fire Made Flesh".
