= Louise Simonson =

American comic book writer and editor (born 1946)

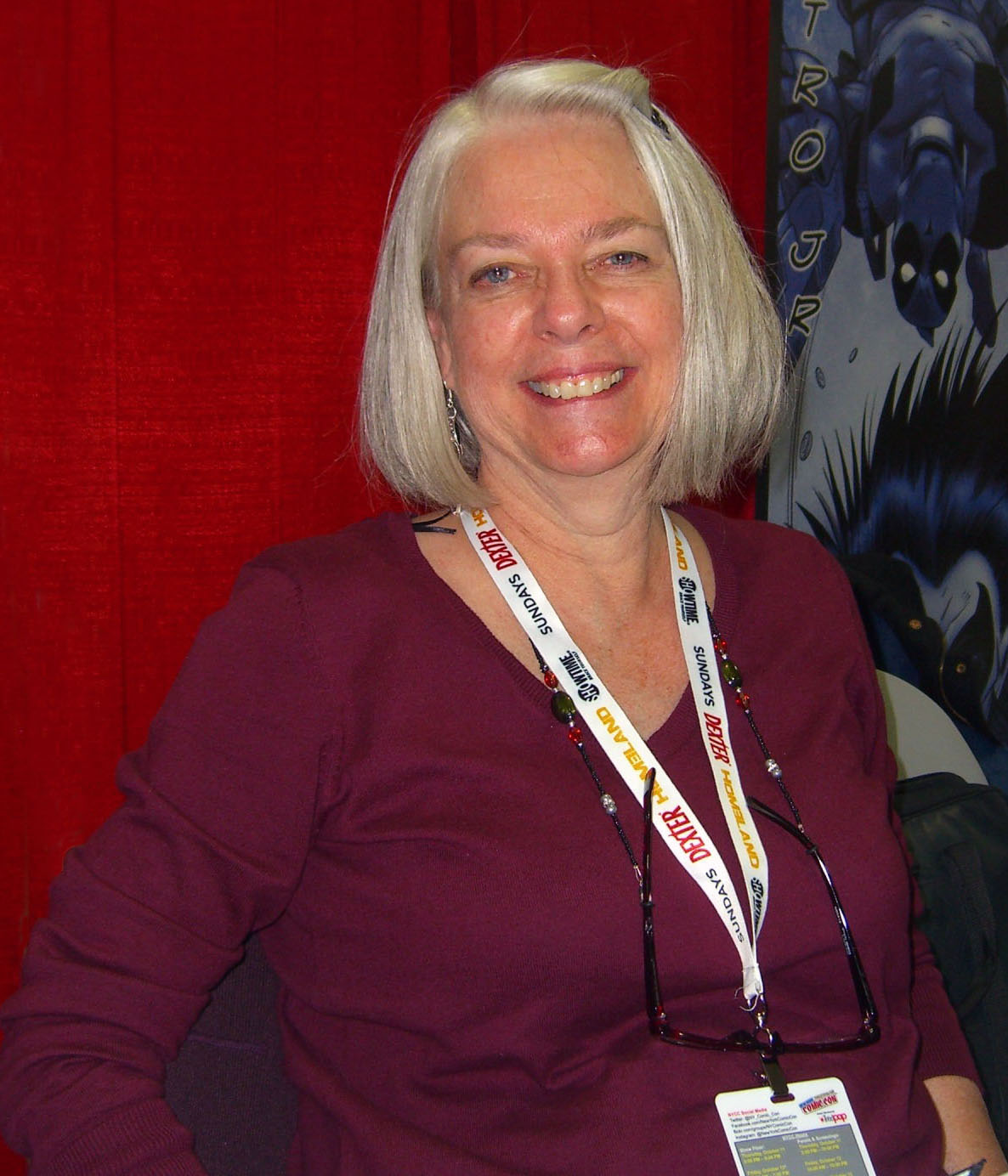
- Simonson at the 2012 New York Comic Con
- Born: Mary Louise Alexander; September 26, 1946 (age 80) Atlanta, Georgia, U.S.
- Areas: Writer, Editor, Colourist
- Pseudonyms: Louise Jones, Weezie
- Notable works: New Mutants, Power Pack, Steel, Conan (as editor), Superman: The Man of Steel, X-Factor
- Awards: Eagle Award for Power Pack; Comics Buyer's Guide Award for The Death of Superman; Inkpot Award for Outstanding Achievement in Comic Arts

Louise Simonson (née Mary Louise Alexander; born September 26, 1946) is an American comic book writer and editor. She is best known for her work on comic book titles such as Conan the Barbarian, Power Pack, X-Factor, The New Mutants, Superman: The Man of Steel, and Steel. She is often referred to by the nickname "Weezie". Among the comic characters she co-created are Cable, Steel, Power Pack, Rictor, Doomsday and the X-Men villain Apocalypse.

In recognition of her contributions to comics, ComicsAlliance listed Simonson as one of twelve female comics creators deserving of lifetime achievement recognition.

== Early life and career ==
In 1964 while attending Georgia State College, Louise met fellow student Jeffrey Jones. The two began dating and were married in 1966. Their daughter Julianna was born the following year. After graduation, the couple moved to New York City. Louise modeled for artist Bernie Wrightson's cover of DC Comics' House of Secrets #92 (June–July 1971), the first appearance of Swamp Thing, and was hired by McFadden-Bartell, a magazine publisher and distributor and worked there for three years. She and Jones split up during this time but she continued to use the name Louise Jones for several years afterward.

Louise met the comic book writer and artist Walt Simonson in 1973, began dating in August 1974, and married in 1980. They collaborated on X-Factor from 1986 to 1989.

== Career ==
=== Comics editor ===
In 1974, Jones started her professional comic book career at Warren Publishing. She went from assistant to senior editor of the comics line (Creepy, Eerie, and Vampirella) before leaving the company at the end of 1979.

In January 1980, Jones joined Marvel Comics, where she initially worked again as an editor, most notably on Uncanny X-Men, which she edited for almost four years (#137–182) and Conan the Barbarian (#114–148 ). Simonson (as "Louise Jones") edited another X-Men spin-off, The New Mutants, at its debut in 1983. After leaving the series, she had a "cameo" in New Mutants #21, drawn in as a slumber party guest by artist Bill Sienkiewicz. During this period, she also edited Marvel's Star Wars and Indiana Jones comics.

In 2017, she edited the graphic novel Son of Shaolin for Image Comics.

=== Comics writer ===
At the end of 1983, Jones quit her editing job at Marvel to try her hand at full-time writing as Louise Simonson. She created the Eagle Award-winning Power Pack. The title, which debuted in August 1984, featured the adventures of four pre-teen superheroes. Simonson wrote the majority of the title's first forty issues, even coloring one issue (#18). Her other Marvel writing work included Starriors, Marvel Team-Up, Web of Spider-Man, and Red Sonja. Louise helped her husband Walt Simonson color his "Star Slammers" story in Marvel Graphic Novel #6 (1983).

In 1986 Bob Layton, writer of the X-Men spin-off X-Factor, was running late on a deadline, and Simonson was called in to write a fill-in issue of X-Factor. This story was never published, since Layton ultimately turned his story in on time, but while writing it Simonson found herself inspired by the characters, to the point where she brought a list of her ideas to editor Bob Harras in the hopes that Layton might use them for the series. Instead, Layton ended up dropping X-Factor shortly after, and at Chris Claremont and Ann Nocenti's suggestion, Harras chose Simonson as his replacement. In #6, her first issue, she and artist Jackson Guice introduced Apocalypse, a character who would go on to make repeated appearances in the X-Men franchise. From #10 of the title, she was joined by her husband, Walt Simonson, on pencils. In #25, the creators gave the character, Angel, blue skin and metal wings in a process which led to his being renamed as "Archangel". It was at Simonson's suggestion that X-Men writer Chris Claremont's "Mutant Massacre" story idea was turned into a crossover through all the "X-books", the first of its kind. Her run on X-Factor included the relevant installments of "Mutant Massacre", and the subsequent crossovers "Fall of the Mutants," "Inferno", and "X-Tinction Agenda". She ended her run on the title with #64 in 1991.

In 1987, beginning with issue #55, she became the New Mutants scripter. Similarly to X-Factor, she was originally brought in as a fill-in writer so that Chris Claremont could launch two other titles, but ended up writing the series for three and a half years, ending with #97 in 1991. It was during this run that she and artist Rob Liefeld introduced Cable, another important character in the X-Men franchise. In 1988–89, she and her husband co-wrote the Havok and Wolverine: Meltdown limited series painted by Jon J Muth and Kent Williams.

In 1991, Simonson began writing for DC Comics. She, artist Jon Bogdanove, and editor Mike Carlin launched a new Superman title, Superman: The Man of Steel — a title she wrote for eight years until #86 in 1999. She contributed to such storylines as "Panic in the Sky" in 1992. Later that year, Simonson (along with Carlin, Dan Jurgens, Roger Stern, and others) was one of the chief architects of "The Death of Superman" storyline, in which Superman died and was resurrected. It was during that storyline, in The Adventures of Superman #500 (June 1993), that Simonson and Bogdanove introduced their character Steel, who graduated to his own title in February 1994, with Simonson as writer until #31. The character went on to feature in an eponymous feature film starring Shaquille O'Neal in 1997. Simonson was one of the many creators who worked on the Superman: The Wedding Album one-shot in 1996 wherein the title character married Lois Lane.

In 1999, Simonson returned to Marvel to write a Warlock series, which featured a character from her previous New Mutants run. That same year, she wrote a miniseries, Galactus the Devourer, in which Galactus died temporarily. In 2005, she wrote stories featuring Magnus, Robot Fighter for the publisher Ibooks, Inc. In 2007, Simonson wrote a one-shot starring Magik of the New Mutants as part of a four-issue event known as Mystic Arcana. In 2009, she wrote two issues of Marvel Adventures featuring Thor. The next year, she scripted the five-part limited series X-Factor Forever and reunited with June Brigman for a new Power Pack story in Girl Comics #3. Simonson also co-wrote the comic World of Warcraft, based on the multi-million player internet game, for Wildstorm, and a manga story, based in the Warcraft universe, for Tokyopop. In 2011, DC hired Louise Simonson to write DC Retroactive: Superman - The '90s, pencilled by her Man of Steel-collaborator Jon Bogdanove.

Simonson wrote the "Five Minutes" chapter in Action Comics #1000 (June 2018) and a twelve-part webcomic tie-in to The Death of Superman animated movie. In 2019, she contributed two stories to DC Primal Age #1 and teamed up with June Brigman again for the one-shot Power Pack: Grow Up. In 2020 she scripted the comic adaptation of Leigh Bardugo's novel Wonder Woman: Warbringer as well as a comic tie-in to the movie Wonder Woman 1984. Simonson revisited her runs on X-Factor and New Mutants with new stories for X-Men Legends, pencilled by her husband Walt and published in 2021 and 2022.

In April 2022, Simonson and her husband were among the more than three dozen comics creators who contributed to Operation USA's benefit anthology book, Comics for Ukraine: Sunflower Seeds, a project spearheaded by IDW Publishing Special Projects Editor Scott Dunbier, whose profits would be donated to relief efforts for Ukrainian refugees resulting from the February 2022 Russian invasion of Ukraine. Simonson teamed up with artist June Brigman to produce an original story with new characters created specifically for the anthology.

In 2023, she wrote a four-issue Jean Grey mini-series for Marvel Comics. In 2024, the five-issue retro series Power Pack: Into the Storm by Simonson and June Brigman, with a story that takes place during their original run, was published by Marvel.

In 2026 she publishes Uncle Scrooge: A Christmas Carol, under the Marvel label.

=== Novelist ===
From 1993 through 2009, she wrote five picture books and eleven novels for middle-readers, many of which featured characters from DC Comics. Two YA novels, Justice League: The Gauntlet and Justice League: Wild at Heart, published by Bantam Books, were based on the Justice League cartoon. She wrote an adult Batman novel and the non-fiction DC Comics Covergirls.

== Awards ==
- Eagle Award for Power Pack (1985)
- Comics Buyer's Guide Award for The Death of Superman (1992)
- Inkpot Award for Outstanding Achievement in Comic Arts (1992)

== Bibliography ==
=== Capstone Publishers ===
- Far Out Fairy Tales: Snow White and the Seven Robots OGN (2015)

=== Dark Horse Comics ===
- Star Wars: River of Chaos #1–4 (1995)

=== DC Comics ===
- Action Comics #701, 1000, Annual #6 (1994, 2018)
- Adventures of Superman #500, 568–569, 571, Annual #3 (1993–1999)
- Convergence Superman: Man of Steel #1–2 (2015)
- DC Primal Age #1 (2019)
- DC Retroactive: Superman - The '90s #1 (2011)
- The Death of Superman #1–12 (webcomic) (2018)
- The Death of Superman 30th Anniversary Special #1 (2023)
- Detective Comics #635–637, Annual #4 (1991)
- Doomsday Annual #1 (1995)
- New Titans #87, 94–96, Annual #10 (1992–1994)
- The Return of Superman 30th Anniversary Special #1 (2023)
- Showcase '96 #2 (1996)
- Steel #1–3, 5–16, 21–27, 29–31, #0, Annual #2 (1994–1996)
- Supergirl/Lex Luthor Special #1 (1993)
- Superman 3-D #1 (1998)
- Superman Forever #1 (1998)
- Superman Red/Superman Blue #1 (1998)
- Superman: Save the Planet #1 (1998)
- Superman: The Man of Steel #1–56, 59–83, 86, #0, Annual #2, 4, 6 (1991–1999)
- Superman: The Man of Tomorrow #11–14 (1998–1999)
- Superman: The Wedding Album #1 (1996)
- Wonder Woman #600 (2010)
- Wonder Woman 1984 #1 (with Anna Obropta) (2020)
- Wonder Woman: Agent of Peace #8 (digital) (2020)
- Wonder Woman: Warbinger GN (2020)
- Wonderful Women of the World GN (among others) (2021)
- World of Warcraft #15–25 (2009–2010)

=== Ibooks ===
- Magnus, Robot Fighter #1 (2005)

=== IDW ===
- Comics for Ukraine: Sunflower Seeds (anthology) (2022)
- Rocketeer Adventures #4 (2012)
- Super Secret Crisis War #1–6 (2014)
- Super Secret Crisis War! Codename: Kids Next Door one-shot (2014)
- Super Secret Crisis War! Cow and Chicken one-shot (2014)
- Super Secret Crisis War! Foster's Home for Imaginary Friends one-shot (2014)
- Super Secret Crisis War! The Grim Adventures of Billy and Mandy one-shot (2014)
- Super Secret Crisis War! Johnny Bravo one-shot (2014)

=== Image ===
- Gen13 Bootleg #4 (1997)
- Wildstorm! #1 (with Walt Simonson) (1995)

=== Marvel Comics ===
- Adventures in Reading Starring the Amazing Spider-Man #1 (promo) (1990)
- Amazing High Adventure #1 (1984)
- The Amazing Spider-Man Annual #19 (1985)
- Avengers: Earth's Mightiest Heroes #9 (2013)
- Avengers Origins #1 (promo) (2015)
- Captain America Meets the Asthma Monster #1 (promo) (1988)
- Chaos War: X-Men #1 (2011)
- Fantastic Four #645, Annual 2000 (2015, 2000)
- Galactus: The Devourer #1–6 (1999–2000)
- Girl Comics #3 (2010)
- Havok and Wolverine Meltdown #1–4 (1989)
- Heroes for Hope Starring the X-Men #1 (1985)
- Iron Age #3 (2011)
- Jean Grey #1–4 (2023)
- Life of Christ: The Christmas Story #1 (1993)
- Life of Christ: The Easter Story #1 (1993)
- Marvel Adventures: Super Heroes #7, 11 (2009)
- Marvel Super Special #38 (1985)
- Marvel Team-Up #149–150, Annual #7 (1984–1985)
- Mystic Arcana: Magik #1 (2007)
- New Mutants #55–80, 82–91, 93–97, Annual #4–6 (1987–1991)
- Power Pack #1–20, 22–33, 35, 37, 39–41, Holiday Special #1 (1984–1988, 1992)
- Power Pack: Grow Up #1 (2019)
- Power Pack: Into the Storm 1–5 (2024)
- Red Sonja #8–13 (1985–1986)
- Sensational She-Hulk #29–30 (1991)
- Spellbound #1–6 (1988)
- Spider-Man and Power Pack #1 (promo) (1984)
- Starriors #1–4 (1984–1985)
- Warlock #1–9 (1999–2000)
- Web of Spider-Man #1–3 (1985)
- Women of Marvel #1 (foreword) (2021)
- X-Factor #6–64, Annual #3, 5 (1986–1991)
- X-Factor Forever #1–5 (2010)
- X-Men: Black Sun #4 (2000)
- X-Men: Gold #1 (2014)
- X-Men: Legends (X-Factor) #3–4; (New Mutants) #11 (2021–2022)
- X-Terminators #1–4 (1988–1989)
- Uncle Scrooge: A Christmas Carol (2026)

=== Tokyopop ===
- Warcraft Legends #5 (2009)

=== Valiant ===
- Faith #5–6 (2016)

=== Virtual Comics ===
- The 6 #2–3 (1996)

=== Warren Publishing ===
- Creepy #101 (1978)
- Eerie #81 (with David Michelinie), #99 (1977–1979)

=== Welsh Publishing Group ===
- Superman & Batman Magazine #5 (1994)

Preceded by n/a	Power Pack writer 1984–1988	Succeeded by Jon Bogdanove
Preceded by Bob Layton	X-Factor writer 1986–1991	Succeeded by Whilce Portacio
Preceded by Chris Claremont	New Mutants writer 1987–1991	Succeeded by Fabian Nicieza
Preceded by n/a	Superman: The Man of Steel writer 1991–1998	Succeeded by Mark Schultz
Preceded by Walt Simonson	World of Warcraft writer 2009–2010 (with Walt Simonson)	Succeeded by Mike Costa
