= X-Terminators =

Fictional comic book characters

Publication information
- Publisher: Marvel Comics
- First appearance: X-Terminators #1 (October 1988) (cover only); X-Terminators #2 (November 1988) (full appearance); Krakoan team: X-Terminators (vol. 2) #1 (September 2022)
- Created by: Louise Simonson; Jon Bogdanove; Krakoan team: Leah Williams; Carlos Gómez

In-story information
- Member(s): Artie Maddicks; Boom-Boom; Cable; Cannonball; Firefist; Khora of the Burning Heart; Leech; Lila Cheney; Rictor; Skids; Wiz Kid; Krakoan team: Boom-Boom; Dazzler; Jubilee; Wolverine

The X-Terminators is the name of several fictional groups of mutant characters appearing in American comic books published by Marvel Comics. The first incarnation of the group was created by Louise Simonson and Jon Bogdanove and first appeared in X-Terminators #2 (November 1988). The second incarnation was created by Leah Williams and Carlos Gómez and first appeared in X-Terminators (vol. 2) #1 (September 2022).

== Publication history ==
The X-Terminators was initially the undercover name for the first incarnation of X-Factor, first using the name in X-Factor #8 (June 1986). The wards of these characters would then go on to take the name during the "Inferno" event, with a four-issue tie-in miniseries and appearances in The New Mutants #72–74 (February–April 1989) and The New Mutants Annual #7 (August 1991). The group would reform under Cable in the one-shot Cable: Reloaded (October 2021). The second group to take the name starred in a 2022–2023 five-issue limited series in the "Destiny of X" line of X-Men comics.

== Fictional history ==
The five original X-Men (Angel, Beast, Cyclops, Iceman, and Marvel Girl) had founded X-Factor, and posed as normal humans purported to be an organization of mutant-hunters. When they went into action in costume in public, they posed as another mutant team under the name X-Terminators. Eventually, X-Factor realized that this ruse was actually a ploy by their former business manager Cameron Hodge to worsen human-mutant relations and they abandoned the X-Terminators identity.

In their time posing as mutant-hunters, X-Factor secretly gathered together a number of mutants, including some Morlocks and several adolescents. The group consisted of Boom-Boom, Rusty Collins, Rictor, Skids, and two younger children, Leech and Artie Maddicks.

== Members ==
In 1988, the team debuted in X-Terminators #1.

Members
Character	Real name
Artie Maddicks
Boom-Boom	Tabitha "Tabby" Smith
Firefist	Russell "Rusty" Collins
Leech
Rictor	Julio Esteban "Ric" Richter
Skids	Sally Blevins
Wiz Kid	Takeshi "Taki" Matsuya

Reformed Team
Character	Real name
Boom-Boom	Tabitha "Tabby" Smith
Cable	Nathan Christopher Charles Summers
Cannonball	Samuel Zachary Guthrie
Khora of the Burning Heart
Lila Cheney
Wiz Kid	Takeshi "Taki" Matsuya

Krakoan Team
Character	Real name
Boom-Boom	Tabitha 'Tabby' Smith
Dazzler	Alison Blaire
Jubilee	Jubilation Lee
X-23 / Wolverine	Laura Kinney

== In other media ==
Boom-Boom, Rusty Collins, Skids, and Wiz Kid appear in the X-Men: The Animated Series episode "No Mutant Is An Island". These versions are orphaned mutants who Cyclops meets while visiting his old orphanage in Nebraska. A man known as Killgrave, who secretly possess mind-control powers, adopts them, seemingly out of charity. In reality, Killgrave intends to use their powers to take over as governor. Cyclops is ultimately able to free them from Killgrave's control.
