= MV Escaut =

A number of motor vessels were named Escaut, including:

- MV Escaut (1929), a Dutch coaster in service 1929–41
- MV Escaut (1938), a Belgian cargo ship in service 1938–41
