= Manan, Kapurthala =

Manan
- Village
- Location in Punjab, India Manan (India)
- Coordinates: 31.275148°N 75.395138°E
- Country: India
- State: Punjab
- District: Kapurthala

Government
  - Type: Panchayati raj (India)
  - Body: Gram panchayat

Population (2011)
  - Total: 585
- Sex ratio 268/317♂/♀

Languages
  - Official: Punjabi
  - Other spoken: Hindi
- Time zone: UTC+5:30 (IST)
- PIN: 144625
- Telephone code: 01822
- ISO 3166 code: IN-PB
- Vehicle registration: PB-09

Manan is a village in Kapurthala district of Punjab State, India. It is located 13 kilometres (8.1 mi) from Kapurthala, which is both district and sub-district headquarters of Manan. The village is administrated by a Sarpanch who is an elected representative.

== Demography ==
According to the 2011 Census of India, Manan had 113 houses with a total population of 585 persons, of which 268 were male and 317 females. The Literacy rate was 69.31%, lower than the state average of 75.84%. The population of children in the age group 0–6 years was 67, being 11.45% of the total population. The child sex ratio was approximately 1310, higher than the state average of 846.

== Population data ==
Particulars	Total	Male	Female
Total No. of Houses	113	-	-
Population	585	268	317
Child (0-6)	67	29	38
Schedule Caste	355	168	187
Schedule Tribe	0	0	0
Literacy	69.31 % 75.31%	64.16 %	
Total Workers	153	136	17
Main Worker	144	0	0
Marginal Worker	9	4	5
