= Kot Manan =

Kot Manan کوٹ منان
- Village
- Location within Pakistan
- Coordinates: 32°27′45.36″N 74°28′20.28″E
- Country: Pakistan
- Province: Punjab
- Division: Gujranwala
- District: Sialkot

Government
- Elevation: 243 m (797 ft)
- Time zone: UTC+5 (PST)
- Postal code: 35510
- Calling code: 052

Kot Manan is a village in Sialkot District in Punjab province of Pakistan. It is located south south-west of the city of Sialkot.
