= Manon Lescaut (disambiguation) =

Manon Lescaut is a short novel by Prévost.

Manon Lescaut may also refer to:

- Manon Lescaut (Puccini), an 1893 opera by Giacomo Puccini
- Manon Lescaut (Auber), an 1856 opera by Daniel Auber
- Manon Lescaut (1914 film), film directed by Herbert Hall Winslow
- Manon Lescaut (1926 film), film directed by Arthur Robison, starring Lya De Putti
- Manon Lescaut (1940 film), film directed by Carmine Gallone, starring Alida Valli and Vittorio De Sica
- The Lovers of Manon Lescaut (Italian: Gli amori di Manon Lescaut),1954 film directed by Mario Costa
- Manon Lescaut (ballet), by Jean-Pierre Aumer

== See also ==
- Manon (disambiguation)
