= New Mutants =

Marvel Comics superhero team

- Cover of New Mutants (vol. 3) #1 (April 2009) by Diógenes Neves. Clockwise from top left: Warlock, Sunspot, Cannonball, Danielle Moonstar, Magma, Karma, Magik, Cypher, and Legion

Publication information
- Publisher: Marvel Comics
- First appearance: The New Mutants (September 1982)
- Created by: Chris Claremont; Bob McLeod

In-story information
- Base(s): Former: Xavier's School for Gifted Youngsters; Ship; Current: Akademos Habitat
- Member(s): Original: Mirage; Cannonball; Karma; Sunspot; Wolfsbane

The New Mutants are a group of mutant superheroes appearing in American comic books published by Marvel Comics, generally in association with the X-Men. Originally depicted as the teenaged junior class at the Xavier Institute, subsequent stories have depicted the characters as adult superheroes (in their eponymous series as well as in related titles such as X-Force and The Avengers) or as teachers and mentors to younger mutants.

The team first appeared in The New Mutants (September 1982) by Chris Claremont and artist Bob McLeod, part of the Marvel Graphic Novel line, followed by the ongoing series The New Mutants which ran from 1983 until 1991. Like the X-Men parent title, also written by Claremont, The New Mutants featured an ensemble cast, with stories often focused on interpersonal relationships and coming-of-age arcs, blending teen drama with action and adventure. The title was taken over by writer Louise Simonson, ultimately taking a more action-oriented focus under artist Rob Liefeld, who relaunched the characters as X-Force following the series' end.

Since their inception, several New Mutants series have been published, either focusing on the continuing adventures of the original lineup, new groups of young mutants, or some combination of both. Individual characters have appeared in various film, television, and other media adaptations of the X-Men franchise, while most of the original lineup of the New Mutants was featured in the 2020 20th Century Studios film of the same name.

== Original run ==
By the early 1980s, The Uncanny X-Men (under the authorship of Chris Claremont) had become one of the comic book industry's most successful titles, prompting Marvel editor-in-chief Jim Shooter to launch The New Mutants, the first of several X-Men spin-offs. X-Men editor Louise Simonson recalled "Neither Chris [Claremont] or I really wanted to do it. We wanted X-Men to be special and by itself, but Shooter told us that if we didn't come up with a new 'mutant' book, someone else would." The name was a modification of Stan Lee's original name for the X-Men, "The Mutants".

The New Mutants were teenaged students of Professor Charles Xavier's School for Gifted Youngsters and wore matching uniforms, much like the original X-Men, who had since grown into adulthood. These students resembled the "all-new, all-different X-Men" of their era in terms of ethnic diversity.

The original team consisted of:

- Cannonball (Samuel Guthrie), a mild-mannered 16-year-old coal miner's son from Kentucky, United States and eventual co-leader, with the ability to generate thermo-chemical energy and propel himself through the air, during which he is invulnerable.
- Karma (Mạnh Cao Xuân), a 19-year-old girl from Vietnam and the team's original leader, who could mentally possess other people's minds.
- Mirage (Danielle Moonstar, originally codenamed Psyche), a Cheyenne Native American girl and eventual co-leader after Karma's apparent death, who could create visual empathic three-dimensional illusions.
- Sunspot (Roberto da Costa), a 14-year-old boy from Brazil who had superhuman strength fueled by sunlight and could store solar energy in his body to use his super strength.
- Wolfsbane (Rahne Sinclair), a 13-year-old Presbyterian girl from Scotland, United Kingdom who could transform into a werewolf-like creature.

The team was intended to debut in their own series. As the first issue was nearing completion, Shooter ordered it to be reworked into a graphic novel so that Marvel Graphic Novel could make its deadline for the next issue. Thus, the New Mutants debuted in Marvel Graphic Novel #4 (December 1982), which continued a plotline from The Uncanny X-Men. Despite this, the graphic novel missed its shipping slot by two weeks due to artist Bob McLeod's honeymoon.

In addition to very serious depictions of teenage angst and growing pains, the series featured themes of mysticism. The stories also relied on wilder, more far-fetched premises than were typical of X-Men at the time, shaping into more of a science fiction and fantasy series than the superhero coming-of-age comic it had been touted as in its early days. Locales included demonic dimensions, alternate futures, and an ancient Roman civilization hidden within the Amazon rainforest. The New Mutants also encountered a secret society called the Hellfire Club, and began a rivalry with their young apprentices, the Hellions.

Karma was dropped from the series after six issues under initially unclear circumstances. The New Mutants #6 ends on a cliffhanger as the building the New Mutants are in explodes, but issue #7 skips ahead several days and opens with the New Mutants grieving the missing Karma, with no explanation for how she was lost. It was not until a flashback by Sunspot in issue #10 that Karma's absence was explained. Adding further to the confusion, while Karma was dropped from the series head roster for the cover of issue #7, she returned to the head roster on the covers of issues #8 and 9, even though she was still gone. After the apparent death of Karma, Cannonball and Dani Moonstar act as co-leaders. New recruits included:

- Cypher (Douglas Ramsey), an otherwise ordinary young man who could learn to read or speak any language rapidly, whether it was human, alien, or machine, making him an unmatched computer expert.
- Magik (Illyana Rasputina), younger sister of the X-Man Colossus and long-time resident of the X-Mansion, an accomplished mystic who can open "teleportation discs" allowing travel to Limbo and any point on Earth.
- Magma (Amara Aquilla), a fiercely tempered native of a secret Roman society in the Amazon who can control lava.
- Warlock, an extraterrestrial of the techno-organic race known as the Technarchy. Considered a pariah due to the uncommon trait of empathy.

A supplementary series, The New Mutants Annual, began in 1984. These annuals were always written by whoever was the regular New Mutants writer at the time and often included significant changes to the status quo. These changes were not explained in the parent series, so that readers would have to buy The New Mutants Annual to follow events in both series. Annual #1 (1984) featured the first appearance of Cannonball's love interest, rock musician Lila Cheney, and was drawn by McLeod. The 1985 annual, which was solicited as The New Mutants Annual #2 but published as The New Mutants Special Edition #1 because it exceeded the maximum page count for an annual, saw Mirage inducted into the Valkyrior and Cypher and Warlock merging into one body for the first time. A 1987 issue of Comics Feature called The New Mutants Special Edition #1 "the single finest New Mutants tale to date and one of the best comics published in the past decade", citing Claremont's penchant for fantasy, artist Arthur Adams's depiction of Warlock, and the strong individual development of all the characters. Annual #2 (1986) featured the first American appearance of Psylocke; it, along with Annual #3 (1987), was drawn by Alan Davis. Annual #4 (1988) saw Mirage's powers dramatically enhanced so that she created physical manifestations of people's fears and desires rather than illusions. Annual #5 (1989) covers the New Mutants' return to Earth after a lengthy stay in Asgard in the main series. Annual #6 (1990) was part of the "Days of Future Present" crossover. It also featured the first appearance (in pin-up form) of Shatterstar, as part of a planned line-up change preview that was ultimately discarded when Louise Simonson left the series. Annual #7 (1991) was the last issue of the series.

Furthermore, in 1990, Ann Nocenti and Bret Blevins produced an 80-page issue called The New Mutants Summer Special. The special saw several New Mutants (Boom Boom, Wolfsbane, Sunspot, and Warlock) dragged into a world of television, which served as a vehicle for Nocenti to discuss mass media theory.

In 1986, Professor X was written out of the series. Before he left, he made the X-Men's one-time nemesis, Magneto, headmaster of his school. Magneto became the team's longest-running headmaster, holding the position from The New Mutants #35 through to #75. Fiercely overprotective of his students, particularly after the events of the "Mutant Massacre" and "Fall of the Mutants", he was increasingly used as an uptight foil for the adventurous New Mutants, setting rules that they would inevitably break in the interests of helping their friends.

During Simonson's run, Magma is written out of the book, and Magik is de-aged back to childhood. Due to his unpopularity with readers and artists, Cypher is killed off in The New Mutants #60 (February 1988). Simonson recalled, "He wasn't fun to draw. He just stood around and hid behind a tree during a fight... Every artist who ever did him said 'Can't we kill this guy?' We would get letters from fans about how much they hated him." Simonson also folded the X-Terminators, a group of young wards from X-Factor, into the New Mutants.

The X-Terminators added to the team were:

- Boom-Boom (Tabitha Smith), a teen runaway who could create "plasma bombs."
- Rusty Collins, a pyrokinetic wanted by the U.S. government.
- Rictor (Julio Richter), a young Mexican who could create shock waves.
- Skids (Sally Blevins), a former Morlock who could project a frictionless force field around her body.

In 1989, Simonson crafted a saga in which the team journeyed to Asgard, the home of the gods of Norse mythology. The storyline wrote Mirage out of the series, as she joined the Norse pantheon as one of the Valkyrior. The New Mutants #64 deals with the team's mourning of Cypher, and includes a scene in which Warlock attempts to resurrect Cypher by taking his corpse out of its coffin and showing it to Cypher's loved ones. Simonson holds it to be her favorite New Mutants story, though she acknowledges that many readers found it too morbid.

A new mentor for the group, the mysterious mercenary Cable, was introduced. Over the next year, several longtime team members were written out or killed off. When Rob Liefeld and Fabian Nicieza took over as writers of the final three issues of the series, they included several harder-edged characters:

- "Domino" (Vanessa Carlysle), Cable's pale-skinned, black-garbed mercenary lover. She is later revealed to be Copycat impersonating Domino.
- Feral (Maria Callasantos), who possessed a bestial temperament and appearance.
- Shatterstar (Gaveedra Seven), a swashbuckling warrior from another dimension.
- Warpath (James Proudstar), the younger brother of slain X-Man Thunderbird and a former Hellion, an Apache who possessed super strength and speed.

The New Mutants was cancelled in 1991 with issue #100, but the new platoon-like team formed by Cable continued in X-Force. That team featured a variety of the former New Mutants cast.

== Critical response ==
Literary scholar Ramzi Fawaz emphasizes the significance of the original run. He argues that in contrast to the original X-Men stories, New Mutants "radically reassesses the concept of the 'mutant superhero.'" For example, Fawaz writes that mutant powers are re-envisioned as traumatic experiences of shame. He argues that this is a response to the fragmentation of social liberation movements in the 1980s. He writes that "Like the social movements of the 1980s that destabilized instrumentalist understandings of politics, The New Mutants recast the figure of the superhero as a contingent political actor detached from an assumed role as a purveyor of liberal ideals."

== New X-Men: Academy X ==
New Mutants (Training Squad)
- The New Mutants from New X-Men: Academy X #2 by Randy Green. From left to right: Danielle Moonstar, Surge, Prodigy, Wind Dancer, Elixir, Wallflower.

Publication information
- Publisher: Marvel Comics
- First appearance: New X-Men: Academy X #2 (August 2004)
- Created by: Nunzio DeFilippis; Christina Weir; Keron Grant; Randy Green

In-story information
- Base(s): Xavier Institute for Higher Learning
- Member(s): Danielle Moonstar (advisor); Elixir; Icarus; Prodigy; Surge; Wallflower; Wind Dancer; Wither

The second incarnation of the New Mutants debuted in 2003 with an ongoing series of the same name, written by Nunzio DeFilippis and Christina Weir. The series continued for 13 issues, until June 2004. Following the end of Grant Morrison's New X-Men, New Mutants was then relaunched as New X-Men: Academy X. The series featured a handful of the dozens of mutant teenagers attending the Xavier Institute, as well as their instructors, which included various X-Men as well as former members of the original New Mutants (Karma, Magma, Danielle Moonstar, and Wolfsbane).

The featured group of students never refer to themselves as "the New Mutants" before the series relaunch as New X-Men: Academy X in 2004, and the reorganization of the Xavier Institute student body into various training squads. The New Mutants, advised by Dani Moonstar, were:

- Elixir (Josh Foley) – Elixir is an Omega-level mutant who can manipulate his or others' biologies to heal or harm. He was one of the 27 students at the Xavier Institute to retain his powers after "M-Day". He was seemingly killed by the Dark Riders before returning with vastly enhanced abilities.
- Icarus (Joshua "Jay" Guthrie) – Jay possesses red wings that allow him to fly and give him an accelerated healing process. Furthermore, he possesses the ability to manipulate his own voice. He was one of the 27 students at the Xavier Institute to retain his powers after "M-Day". Jay's wings are amputated by William Stryker, who later kills him.
- Prodigy (David Alleyne) – David was the team's co-leader who could temporarily gain the knowledge and skills of those near him. Although he was de-powered after "M-Day", he has retained all the knowledge he had acquired prior to the "Decimation".
- Surge (Noriko Ashida) – Noriko is Japanese. She absorbs electricity from her environment which she can discharge as powerful electric blasts or utilize as superhuman speed. She requires mechanical gauntlets to prevent overcharge. Surge was one of the 27 students at the Xavier Institute to retain her powers after "M-Day".
- Wallflower (Laurie Collins) – Laurie is a shy girl who generates highly potent pheromones that influence people's emotions. She was one of the 27 students at the Xavier Institute to retain her powers after "M-Day". Laurie was later killed by one of William Stryker's men.
- Wind Dancer (Sofia Mantega) – Sofia was the other co-leader and was a temperamental aerokinetic who was particularly adept at using this power to manipulate sound. She was depowered after "M-Day" and joined a group of fellow ex-mutants as part of the New Warriors. Donning a variety of mechanical gear, she took up the codename Renascence before the group disbanded.
- Wither (Kevin Ford) – Kevin could cause organic material to decay with his touch. He eventually switches to the Hellions squad. He is later killed by Elixir.

Another such group, advised by Emma Frost, was known as the Hellions and, like their predecessor, was the arch-rival of the New Mutants. Whereas the original New Mutants series revolved around battles with world-threatening menaces, New Mutants volume 2 focused on the characters' personal relationships and struggles with controlling their powers.

After "M-Day", the cataclysmic event that decimated the world's mutant population, only 27 of the 182 students enrolled at the Xavier Institute retained their powers. The New Mutants and the other training squads were disbanded, and the remaining students were folded into a single junior team, the New X-Men.

== Original team reunion ==
New Mutants
- Variant cover to New Mutants (vol. 3) #1 by Bob McLeod.

Publication information
- Publisher: Marvel Comics
- First appearance: New Mutants (vol. 3) #1 (2009)
- Created by: Zeb Wells (writer); Diógenes Neves (artist)

In-story information
- Base(s): Utopia; 1128 Mission Street, San Francisco

In May 2009, a third volume of New Mutants was launched. The team is a reunion of the cast from the first volume, consisting of Cannonball, Karma, Magik, Magma, Danielle Moonstar, and Sunspot.

The reunion is spun from events from the limited series X-Infernus. Magik shows up at the X-Men headquarters in San Francisco, claiming to be from the future and warning that Dani Moonstar and Karma are in danger. Once tests show that Illyanna is not an imposter, Cannonball leads a rescue mission with her. They are joined by Magma and Sunspot. They end up taking on Legion.

In a later issue, Warlock returns to Earth and Cypher reappears alive, under the control of Selene. After Warlock frees him from Selene's control, Cypher joins the team.

During "Siege", Hela empowers Dani (now going by her old codename Mirage) as a Valkyrie to bring the souls of the fallen Asgardians to her. During "X-Men: Second Coming", Karma loses her leg after being stabbed by Cameron Hodge.

Magik leads the team to Limbo as part of her plan for revenge against the Elder Gods. Cyclops has her imprisoned for her actions. When the X-Men split in the "Schism" storyline, the majority of the team sides with Cyclops and stays on Utopia, while Cannonball and Karma side with Wolverine and leave to join the new Jean Grey School for Higher Learning.

Cyclops tasks the remaining team with closing off some of the X-Men's 'unfinished business', and they ultimately recruit:

- X-Man (Nate Grey), an alternate version of Cable from the Age of Apocalypse timeline, who joins the team after they rescue him from Sugar Man.
- Blink (Clarice Ferguson), a pink-skinned mutant who can create portals.

== Dead Souls ==
A six issue mini-series The New Mutants: Dead Souls was launched in March 2018, written by Matthew Rosenberg and pencilled by Adam Gorham. The new team is a corporate-sponsored squad employed by former New Mutant Karma, who has inherited the multinational Hatchi Corporation. The team consists of other former New Mutants Magik, Wolfsbane, Rictor, and Boom-Boom, alongside:

- Strong Guy (Guido Carosella), a mutant with the ability to rechannel kinetic energy into physical strength, who was first introduced during Claremont's run of The New Mutants as a bodyguard to Lila Cheney.

The team investigated paranormal and magical threats, ultimately realizing Karma had sent them on a hunt for her brother Trân Cao Mạnh, whose soul had escaped her body and was seeking a way to restore his own. The series ended on a cliffhanger, where Karma, Magik, Wolfsbane and Strong Guy, along with Mirage, were infected by the Transmode Virus via Warlock. Rosenberg carried the unresolved plot threads across to his contemporaneous run on Uncanny X-Men, folding the remaining members of the New Mutants team into the X-Men, led by Cyclops.

== Krakoan Age ==
New Mutants was relaunched in November 2019 as part of Dawn of X. There were initially two teams who appeared in rotating issues. The first was a reunion of the original New Mutants team, featuring Mirage, Karma, Magik, Sunspot, Wolfsbane, and Cypher, as well as:

- Chamber (Jonathan Staresmore), a mutant originally from Generation X, whose body is a chamber for psionic energy.
- Mondo, another mutant originally from Generation X, who has the ability to take on the properties of any organic or inorganic material he comes into contact with.

The second team featured Boom-Boom and, later, Magma, alongside:

- Armor (Hisako Ichiki), a Japanese mutant who can generate an impenetrable psionic exoskeleton body armor.
- Glob Herman (Robert Herman), a mutant with a transparent, wax-like body.
- Manon and Maxime, two young twins from an alternate timeline who can manipulate memories and emotions respectively.

These two teams ultimately merged into one under writer Ed Brisson, in which they rescued young mutant Cosmar from the fictional European nation Carnella and took on the online hate group DOX.

When Vita Ayala took over as writer, a new team featuring older New Mutants Karma, Magik, Mirage, Warlock, Warpath, and Wolfsbane acted as teachers and mentors to a new group of younger students known as the Lost Club. This new group of students (which at first includes Anole, Scout, Rain Boy, Cosmar, and No-Girl) falls under the influence of and later into conflict with the Shadow King, culminating in an adventure through the astral plane.

In the concluding mini-series New Mutants Lethal Legion, a group of students from the Lost Club join the New Mutants in an adventure that pits them against Count Nefaria and the Lethal Legion. This includes:

- Escapade (Shela Sexton), a transgender mutant who can switch locations or trade possessions and abilities with anyone within seven feet.
- Scout (Gabby Kinney), a clone of Laura Kinney who shares her regenerative powers, as well as natural strength, speed, agility, endurance, and reflexes.
- Cerebella (Martha Johansson), the telepathic mutant formerly known as No-Girl, who was reborn into a new body after spending years as a disembodied brain in a capsule.
- Galura (Gabrielle Diwa), a Filipino mutant with the ability to fly and who had entered into a romantic relationship with Karma.

== New Mutants members ==
In 1982, the original New Mutants team debuted in Marvel Graphic Novel #4. Originally led by Professor X, and later by Magneto, the lineup gradually expanded to include additional recruits, with subsequent volumes and titles have features a variety of team members and associated characters.

Original members
Character	Real name	Joined in	Notes
Professor X	Charles Xavier	Marvel Graphic Novel #4 (1982)	Team founder
Karma	Mạnh Cao Xuân	Marvel Graphic Novel #4 (1982)	Original team leader
Wolfsbane	Rahne Sinclair	Marvel Graphic Novel #4 (1982)	
Psyche / Mirage	Danielle Moonstar	Marvel Graphic Novel #4 (1982)	Eventual co-leader
Cannonball	Samuel Guthrie	Marvel Graphic Novel #4 (1982)	Eventual co-leader
Sunspot	Roberto Da Costa	Marvel Graphic Novel #4 (1982)	

Later recruits
Character	Real name	Joined in	Notes
Shadowcat	Katherine Pryde	The Uncanny X-Men #167 (1983)	Leaves to rejoin X-Men team in The Uncanny X-Men #168
Magma	Amara Aquilla	The New Mutants #13 (1984)	
Magik	Illyana Rasputina	The New Mutants #14 (1984)	
Warlock		The New Mutants #21 (1984)	
Cypher	Douglas Ramsey	The New Mutants #21 (1984)	
Magneto	Max "Magnus" Eisenhardt	The Uncanny X-Men #200 (1985)	Headmaster (replacing Xavier)
Bird-Brain		The New Mutants #55 (1987)	
Firefist	Russell "Rusty" Collins	The New Mutants #77 (1989)	
Skids	Sally Blevins	The New Mutants #77 (1989)	
Rictor	Julio Richter	The New Mutants #77 (1989)	
Boom-Boom	Tabitha "Tabby" Smith	The New Mutants #77 (1989)	
Cable	Nathan Summers	The New Mutants #89 (1990)	Leader (replacing Magneto)
Warpath	James Proudstar	The New Mutants #99 (1991)	
X-Man	Nate Grey	New Mutants (vol. 3) #28 (2011)	
Blink	Clarice Ferguson	New Mutants (vol. 3) #45 (2012)	
Shatterstar	Gaveedra Seven/Benjamin Russell	Cable #150 (2017)	
Longshot		Cable #150 (2017)	
X-23	Laura Kinney	Cable #150 (2017)	
Armor	Hisako Ichiki	Cable #150 (2017)	
Doop		Cable #150 (2017)	
Strong Guy	Guido Carosella	The New Mutants: Dead Souls #1 (2018)	
Chamber	Jonothon Starsmore	New Mutants (vol. 4) #1 (2019)	
Mondo		New Mutants (vol. 4) #1 (2019)	
Glob	Robert Herman	New Mutants (vol. 4) #6 (2020)	
Escapade	Shela Sexton	New Mutants (vol. 4) #31 (2022)	
Cerebella	Martha Johansson	New Mutants Lethal Legion #1 (2023)	Formerly known as No-Girl
Honey Badger / Scout	Gabrielle "Gabby" Kinney	New Mutants Lethal Legion #1 (2023)	
Galura	Gabrielle Diwa	New Mutants Lethal Legion #1 (2023)	

New Mutants Squad (New X-Men)
Character	Real name	Joined in	Notes
Psyche / Mirage	Danielle Moonstar	New X-Men (vol. 2) #2	Team Advisor
Wind Dancer	Sofia Elizabeth Mantega	New X-Men (vol. 2) #2	
Wallflower	Laurie Collins	New X-Men (vol. 2) #2	
Prodigy	David Alleyne	New X-Men (vol. 2) #2	
Surge	Noriko Ashida	New X-Men (vol. 2) #2	
Elixir	Josh Foley	New X-Men (vol. 2) #2	
Wither	Kevin Ford	New X-Men (vol. 2) #2	
Icarus	Joshua Guthrie	New X-Men (vol. 2) #2	

Lost Club (Students of New Mutants on Krakoa)
Character	Real name	Joined in	Notes
Anole	Victor Borkowski	New Mutants (vol. 4) #14 (2020)	
Honey Badger / Scout	Gabrielle "Gabby" Kinney	New Mutants (vol. 4) #14 (2020)	
Rain Boy	Carl Aalston	New Mutants (vol. 4) #14 (2020)	
Cosmar	Natashia Repina	New Mutants (vol. 4) #14 (2020)	
Cerebella	Martha Johansson	New Mutants (vol. 4) #14 (2020)	Formerly known as No-Girl
Escapade	Shela Sexton	New Mutants (vol. 4) #31 (2022)	
Leo	Leo Eng	New Mutants (vol. 4) #31 (2022)	

Notable allies, honorary, and reserve
Character	Real name	Active in	Notes
Brightwind / Darkwind		The New Mutants Special Edition #1 (1985)	Danielle Moonstar's Steed
Gosamyr		The New Mutants #67 (1988)	
Artie Maddicks		The New Mutants #77 (1989)	
Leech		The New Mutants #77 (1989)	
Copycat	Vanessa Carlysle	New Mutants, Vol. 1 #98 (1991)	
Feral	Maria Callasantos	The New Mutants #100	
Maxime			
Manon			

== Other versions ==
=== Rahne of Terra ===
The 1991 graphic novel Wolverine: Rahne of Terra, by Peter David, is set in a heroic fantasy universe in which Wolfsbane's counterpart is Princess Rain of Geshem. Other denizens of Terra include Rain's lady-in-waiting Tabby (Boom-Boom), the knights Richard (Rictor), Robert (Sunspot), and Samuel (Cannonball), and the peasant boy Douglas (Cypher). The Terrans all duplicate the powers of their counterparts in one way or another.

=== The New Mutants: Truth or Death ===
In 1997, a three-issue reunion series written by Ben Raab and illustrated by Bernard Chang, The New Mutants: Truth or Death, featured the young New Mutants traveling forward in time to meet their older, jaded selves in X-Force.

=== Worst X-Man Ever ===
Here the New Mutants consist of X-Ceptional, who can explode permanently, Riches, who turns whatever he touches to gold, Minerva, who can manipulate reality, and Riches' sister Rags. Riches kills Professor X and takes over the world. Rags begins a relationship with Gambit, and Minerva goes to pure idea. X-Ceptional grabs Riches and explodes, killing them both.

=== Ultimate Marvel ===
In Ultimate X-Men, the Academy of Tomorrow (previously called New Mutants) is founded by Emma Frost. It is loosely linked to the X-Men via Emma Frost's professional relationship with her former lover and teacher Charles Xavier. This Academy accepts any talented students, regardless of their genetic status. The team is headed by Frost and field leader Havok. During Ultimatum, the Academy of Tomorrow is destroyed in a terrorist attack by Multiple Man. Former members include Angel, Beast, Cannonball, Dazzler, Karma, Northstar, Polaris, Sunspot, and Cypher.

== In other media ==
=== Television ===
The New Mutants, based on the first comics incarnation, appear in X-Men: Evolution, consisting of Boom-Boom, Cannonball, Magma, Sunspot, Wolfsbane, Berzerker, Iceman, Jubilee, and Multiple.

=== Film ===
A self-titled film adaptation of the New Mutants was released on August 28, 2020. The film was directed by Josh Boone, with a script written by Boone and Knate Gwaltney, and stars Maisie Williams as Rahne Sinclair / Wolfsbane, Anya Taylor-Joy as Illyana Rasputin / Magik, Charlie Heaton as Sam Guthrie / Cannonball, Blu Hunt as Dani Moonstar / Mirage, and Henry Zaga as Bobby da Costa / Sunspot.
