= Leech (character) =

- Leech as depicted in X-Men: The 198 #2 (April 2006). Art by Jim Muniz.

Publication information
- Publisher: Marvel Comics
- First appearance: The Uncanny X-Men #179 (March 1984)
- Created by: Chris Claremont (writer); John Romita Jr. (artist)

In-story information
- Alter ego: James "Jimmy" (X-Men films); Dorian Leach (X-Men: Evolution)
- Species: Human mutant
- Team affiliations: Future Foundation; Weapon X; The 198; Generation X; Daydreamers; X-Terminators; X-Factor; Morlocks; Xavier Institute
- Notable aliases: The Cure; Kid Incredible
- Abilities: Power suppression

Leech is a fictional character appearing in American comic books published by Marvel Comics.

Leech made his first appearance in Uncanny X-Men as a Morlock, a group of mutants whose deformities force them to live in the sewers under Manhattan. He is usually depicted as being around twelve years old, though his exact age and real name are unrevealed. Leech speaks in broken English and refers to himself in the third person.

== Publication history ==
=== 1980s and 1990s ===
Leech first appeared in The Uncanny X-Men #179 (March 1984), and was created by Chris Claremont and John Romita Jr. Leech appeared as a ward of X-Factor in the first volume of the series, as well as X-Terminators and New Mutants, often paired with Artie Maddicks.

In the 1990s, Leech and Artie became wards of Generation X, beginning with issue 6. They would appear alongside Man-Thing, Howard the Duck, Tana Nile, and Franklin Richards in the 1997 three-issue miniseries Daydreamers.

=== 2000s and 2010s ===
Leech appeared as a member of the 198 in the 198 Files. In 2009, Leech and Artie joined the Future Foundation, appearing in two volumes of the series, as well as issues of volumes 3-6 of Fantastic Four. He made appearances in X-Men and Spider-Man titles of the time as well. The pair would later join the mutant nation of Krakoa.

Leech appeared as part of the "Morlocks" entry in The Official Handbook of the Marvel Universe Deluxe Edition #9.

== Fictional character biography ==
Leech in his original depiction with a more elongated skull. Art by John Romita Jr. and Dan Green.

As a child, Leech is abandoned and left to die when his mutations become apparent. He is found by the Morlock Caliban and taken to Annalee, who raises him and several other young mutants as her children. He becomes friends with X-Factor ward Artie Maddicks and has several encounters with the X-Men.

In Mutant Massacre, Annalee and many other mutants are killed by the Marauders, with Leech being among the survivors. X-Factor takes him and Artie Maddicks in until they can be enrolled in St. Simons, a private school that accepts mutants.

Soon after they begin attending St. Simons, Leech and Artie are captured by mutant-hunting demons. Leech's friend Taki Matsuya and an ad-hoc team of mutants, calling themselves the X-Terminators, join with the New Mutants in battling the demonic threat.

Leech, Artie, and Taki return to St. Simons, though they do not stay out of trouble. Taki's crush on a teacher leads to uncovering a plot by mutant-hating humans to kidnap and kill as many mutants as possible. The young trio disobey orders and literally fly off. After much violence, the kidnapping plans are discovered and the conspirators arrested. A nearby resident, Ida Fassbender, discovers the trio's technologically assisted jaunts, and her paranoia endangers their lives. Ida resolves the problem and allows the three to visit her whenever they want. Leech is comforted by Ida's resemblance to Annalee.

Artie and Leech are kidnapped by Gene Nation, a group of Morlocks who are descended from the survivors of the Morlock massacre and were born and raised in an alternate dimension with a faster flow of time. Gene Nation leads a campaign to hunt down and kill as many humans as possible, viewing them as responsible for their suffering. Leech and Artie are rescued by Generation X and made junior members.

Leech and Artie Maddicks come to live at the Massachusetts Academy under the care of Emma Frost and Sean Cassidy. The school later goes bankrupt, forcing Emma and Sean to open the school to human students. To keep Artie and Leech from being isolated, Emma gives them image inducers that will disguise them as humans. Soon after, the school is exposed as a home for mutants, and Artie, Leech, and Penance are sent away to protect them.

At some point, Leech is captured by the revived Weapon X program and is used to keep imprisoned mutants under control. When the program is about to be discovered, those responsible attempt to erase all information surrounding it by killing the prisoners. Leech survives and is one of the estimated 198 mutants who retain their powers after M-Day.

When Nitro's destruction of Stamford, Connecticut causes the public to turn on superheroes at the start of the "Civil War" storyline, Domino, Shatterstar, and Caliban break out the 198 and take them to a bunker in the middle of the desert. They are sealed inside with nuclear weapons that are activated for self-detonation, but they are eventually freed from the bunker. Leech accompanies Caliban to the Morlock tunnels, where they are attacked by an extremist group of Morlocks led by Masque. Masque kidnaps Leech, but he is rescued by the X-Men and Skids.

Leech and Artie Maddicks are invited to Franklin Richards's birthday, and as a gift, Franklin invites them to live with the Fantastic Four. The two are enrolled in a special class with several Moloids and Alex Power of the Power Pack, among others. Leech later joins the Future Foundation.

== Powers and abilities ==
Leech can dampen or completely suppress, for an undetermined amount of time, the powers and abilities of any superpowered beings within 50 feet of him. His dampening ability was initially involuntary and uncontrollable, but now appears to be under his conscious control.

== Reception ==
In 2014, Entertainment Weekly ranked Leech and Artie Maddicks 23rd in their "Let's rank every X-Man ever" list.

== Other versions ==
=== Age of Apocalypse ===
An alternate universe version of Leech from Earth-295 appears in Age of Apocalypse.

=== Days of Future Past ===
An alternate universe version of Leech from Earth-811 appears in Wolverine: Days of Future Past.

=== Ultimate Marvel ===
An alternate universe version of Leech from Earth-1610 appears in Ultimate X-Men.

=== Ultimate Universe ===
An alternate universe version of Leech from Earth-6160 appears in Ultimate Wolverine.

== In other media ==
Leech (right) as depicted in X-Men: The Last Stand.

=== Television ===
- Leech appears in X-Men: The Animated Series, voiced by Ron Rubin. This version possesses the additional ability of telekinesis.
  - Leech appears in X-Men '97, voiced by David Errigo Jr. In the episode "Remember It", he joins the Morlocks in moving to Genosha and is killed in the Sentinels' subsequent attack on the island.
- A character based on Leech named Dorian Leech appears in X-Men: Evolution, voiced by Danny McKinnon. He possesses a more humanoid appearance and the additional ability to disable machinery.

=== Film ===
Leech appears in X-Men: The Last Stand, portrayed by Cameron Bright. This version is Jimmy. He possesses a human appearance and was used by Worthington Labs to create a "mutant cure" before joining the Xavier Institute.

=== Video games ===
Leech appears in Marvel's Wolverine, voiced by Noga Wind.
