= X-Factor (comic book) =

American comic book series

- Cover to X-Factor #1 (Feb. 1986). Art by Jackson Guice

Publication information
- Publisher: Marvel Comics
- Schedule: Monthly List: (vol. 1, 3, 1 cont., 4, 5) Ongoing series (vol. 2) Limited series
- Format: Ongoing series
- Genre: Superhero
- Publication date: List: (vol. 1) Feb. 1986–Sept. 1998 (vol. 2) June–Oct. 2002 (vol. 3) Feb. 2006–Dec. 2009 (vol. 1 cont.) Feb. 2010–Sept. 2013 All-New X-Factor Jan. 2014–Jan. 2015 (vol. 4) July 2020-June 2021 (vol. 5) Aug. 2024-May 2025
- No. of issues: List: (vol. 1): 149 (vol. 2): 4 (vol. 3): 50 (vol. 1 cont.): 63 All-New X-Factor: 20 (vol. 4): 10 (vol. 5): 10
- Main character: X-Factor

X-Factor is the name of several comic book titles featuring the team X-Factor and published by Marvel Comics, beginning with the original X-Factor comic book series which debuted in 1986.

It is a spin-off from the popular X-Men franchise, featuring characters from X-Men stories. The series has been relaunched several times with different team rosters, most recently in 2024, by Mark Russell.

X-Factor launched in 1986, featuring the five original X-Men reorganizing as a group in response to the seeming outlaw status of the then-current X-Men team of whom Magneto was a member. In 1991, the founding members were incorporated back into the regular X-Men series, and X-Factor relaunched as a U.S. government-sponsored team incorporating many secondary characters from the X-Men mythos. The series was canceled in 1998 after 149 issues.

The 2005 X-Factor series followed the mutant detective agency X-Factor Investigations. Written by Peter David, the series drew acclaim from Ain't It Cool News, and in 2011 won a GLAAD Media Award for Outstanding Comic Book for the romantic relationship between Rictor and Shatterstar. The series ended in 2013 after 114 issues. The following year, a new series, All-New X-Factor, was launched featuring a new corporate-sponsored X-Factor team. It was written by David and drawn by Carmine Di Giandomenico. It was cancelled after 20 issues due to low sales.

== Publication history ==
=== Original team (1986–1991) ===
X-Factor launched in 1986 featuring a team composed of the five original X-Men that debuted in X-Men #1 (1963).

Original writer Bob Layton wanted X-Factor to be a reunion of the original X-Men, an event complicated by the extensive histories of the characters following the initiation of a new team of X-Men in 1975. With the monthly Defenders series already due to be cancelled, Marvel's editorial staff elected to have the other members of the group killed off in the final issue in order to free up Angel, Beast, and Iceman for X-Factor.

A more difficult task was the return of Cyclops and Jean Grey. In 1980, Grey was killed during the seminal Dark Phoenix Saga, and since it was considered vital that the team have a female member, Layton opted to use fellow mutant Dazzler. Publicity material for the series began to appear at this time, with images of the team using a blank space or silhouette in place of the female member as a teaser mystery. However, writer Kurt Busiek had earlier thought of a way to add Grey to the roster which somebody else suggested that became one of the most significant cases of retroactive continuity in comic book history: Grey had never actually been the Phoenix. Instead, the Phoenix Force copied Grey's identity and form, keeping her safe in a cocoon-like structure beneath Jamaica Bay. Busiek related the idea to Roger Stern, who related it to John Byrne. Byrne wrote and illustrated Fantastic Four #286 (1985), incorporating Busiek's idea. Several panels of this comic were rewritten (by X-Men writer Chris Claremont) and redrawn (by initial X-Factor artist Jackson Guice) to depict the Phoenix entity as less malevolent than Byrne intended.

Cyclops leaving his new wife Madelyne Pryor and their infant son, along with the resurrection of Grey in general, were highly controversial with fans.

The five original members set up a business advertised as mutant-hunters for hire, headquartered in the TriBeCa neighborhood of downtown New York City, posing as "normal" (non-superpowered) humans to their clients.

Bob Layton and Jackson Guice wrote and illustrated, respectively, the first few issues of X-Factor. They soon turned over creative duties to Louise Simonson (writer) and Walt Simonson (artist). Despite their relationship as husband and wife, both the Simonsons have said they did not approach work with each other any differently than any other collaboration; in particular, though Walt occasionally contributed ideas, he did not co-plot the series with his wife. In X-Factor #6 (1986), Louise introduced Apocalypse, who would appear in multiple issues and become X-Factor's nemesis.

Louise Simonson placed the series in line with the darker tone of most of the X-Men franchise; after a year on X-Factor, she remarked that "in real life all of my friends should be happy, but in comic books all of my characters should be miserable." In X-Factor #10, the Marauders, a group of mutant mercenaries, severely injure Angel's wings, which are later amputated. When an interviewer commented on the brutality of this turn of events, Walt Simonson replied, "Hey, that's nothing compared to what happens to him eventually."

Wanting to do stories with more focus on X-Factor's teenage wards, Louise Simonson successfully petitioned editor Bob Harras for permission to do a miniseries featuring them. Following the miniseries, titled X-Terminators, the characters left X-Factor and were moved to New Mutants.

=== Government team (1991–1998) ===
Rather than end the series, Marvel hired writer Peter David and illustrator Larry Stroman to recreate X-Factor with new members who worked for the Pentagon.

The lineup was selected by the X-Factor editorial staff. Legion was to be a member as well, but was dropped because it was felt the character was not suited to be a team player. David was instead given the option to use Quicksilver, which he has said was a pleasant surprise.

Commenting on his approach to the series, David said that his priority was to tell stories which developed the individual characters of the team, remarking "I feel there's nothing unique to the book if you come up with a generic plot and just plug in these characters."

David left in 1993. The series continued under writer J. M. DeMatteis and artist Jan Duursema, but struggled to distinguish itself among other X-books.

Writer John Francis Moore and illustrator Jeff Matsuda introduced a new X-Factor line-up, consisting of Forge as the team's new leader, Polaris, Cooper, and several new recruits.

Afterward, writer Howard Mackie injected more political and espionage elements into the series, a trend that culminated in the team's secession from government sponsorship. The popularity of X-Factor continued to dwindle and Mystique and Sabretooth, two popular X-Men villains, failed to draw in more readers.

In 1997, Marvel attempted yet another revival. After various stories focusing on individual characters, a new team was gathered. However, this version of the team disbands in the same issue in which they debut.

Although Marvel planned to revive X-Factor as an ongoing title after Mutant X ended, this did not happen for another 4 years.

=== Volume 2 (2002 miniseries) ===
A four-issue X-Factor limited series was launched in 2002. This series focused heavily on the "mutants as a metaphor for minorities" aspects of the X-Men concept. The series was written by Jeff Jensen with artwork by Arthur Ranson.

=== Volume 3 (2005–2013) ===
X-Factor Investigations is taken from the government-sponsored group the three founders previously served on.

Peter David put a noir spin on the mutant series and dealt with Jamie Madrox as the central character. The new series spun off of the "House of M" and "Decimation" storylines and also "Madrox" mini-series opens with a suicide attempt by Rictor, who has lost his powers.

Writer Peter David's decision to explicitly establish male characters Shatterstar and Rictor entering a romantic relationship in X-Factor #45 (August 2009), confirming clues that had been established in X-Force years earlier, drew criticism from Shatterstar's co-creator, Rob Liefeld, though Editor-in-Chief Joe Quesada supported David's story. David would eventually be nominated for and win a 2011 GLAAD Media Award for Outstanding Comic Book for this second run on the title.

In December 2009, the series adopted a cumulative numbering with issue #200, with 149 issues of the first volume plus 50 issues of the third volume constituting the previous 199 issues. During the Regenesis relaunch, Polaris and Havok joined the team in X-Factor #230.

The series ended with issue #262 in September 2013.

=== All-New X-Factor (2014–2015) ===
The next incarnation of the series was All-New X-Factor, written by Peter David and illustrated by Carmine Di Giandomenico. This version was announced as a part of the All-New Marvel NOW! initiative at the New York Comic Con in October 2013, and debuted in January 2014.

=== Volume 4 (2020–2021) ===
X-Factor was relaunched in July 2020 as part of Dawn of X written by Leah Williams and drawn by David Baldeon.

=== Volume 5 (2024–present) ===
"X-Factor" was relaunched in August 2024 as part of "X-Men: From the Ashes" written by Mark Russell and drawn by Bob Quinn.

== Contributors ==
=== Vol. 1 (1986–1998) ===
==== Writers ====
Years	Writer	Issues
1986	Bob Layton	#1–5, Annual #1
1986-1991	Louise Simonson	#6-46, #48-54, #56-64, Annual #3, #5
1987	Jo Duffy	Annual #2
1989	John Byrne	Annual #4
1989	Kieron Dwyer	#47
1990, 1991-1993	Peter David	#55, #70-89
1991	Whilce Portacio	#63-68
1991	Chris Claremont	#65-68
1991	Jim Lee	#65-68
1991	Fabian Nicieza	#69, Annual #6
1993-1994	Scott Lobdell	#90-95, #106
1993	Joe Quesada	#92
1993-1994	J. M. DeMatteis	#92-105
1994-1995	Todd Dezago	#103-111
1994-1995	John Francis Moore	#108-114
1995-1998	Howard Mackie	#115-141, #143-146, #148-149; #-1
1998	Bill Rosemann	#142
1998	Joseph Harris	#147

==== Pencilers ====
Years	Penciler	Issues
1986	Jackson Guice	#1–3, #5-7
1986	Keith Pollard	#4
1986	Brett Breeding	Annual #1
1986, 1987, 1990	Marc Silvestri	#8, #12, #54
1986-1993	Terry Shoemaker	#9, #35, #50-53, #55, #59, #93, Annual #3, #6
1986-1989	Walt Simonson	#10–11, #13–15, #17–19, #21, #23–31, #33–34, #36–39
1987	Tom Grindberg	Annual #2
1987	David Mazzucchelli	#16
1987	June Brigman	#20
1987	Sal Buscema	#22
1988	Steve Lightle	#32
1989	Rob Liefeld	#40
1989	Arthur Adams	#41-42
1989	Paul Smith	#43-46, #48-49
1989	Kieron Dwyer	#47
1989	John Byrne	Annual #4
1990	Rich Buckler	#50
1990	Colleen Doran	#55
1990	Steven Carr	#56
1990	Andy Kubert	#57
1990-1991	Jon Bogdanove	#58, #60-62, Annual #5
1990	John Caponigro	#61
1991	Whilce Portacio	#63-69
1991	Kirk Jarvinen	#70
1991-1992	Larry Stroman	#71-75, #77-78, #80-81
1992	Tom Raney	#76
1992	Kevin West	#76
1992	Brandon Peterson	#78
1992	Jim Fern	#79
1992	Rurik Tyler	#82
1992	Mark Pacella	#83
1992-1993	Jae Lee	#84-86
1993	Joe Quesada	#87-92
1993	Paul Ryan	#94
1993-1994	Greg Luzniak	#95-96, #98
1993-1995, 2010	Jan Duursema	#97, #99-104, #106, #108-111, #200
1994, 1996	Bryan Hitch	#105, #118
1994	Roger Cruz	#106
1994	Paul Borges	#107
1995, 1996-1997	Jeff Matsuda	#112, #122-125, #127-129, #131-133, #135-136; #-1
1995	Jerry Bingham	#113
1995-1996	Steve Epting	#114-117, #119, #121
1995, 1996	Stefano Raffaele	#117, #126
1996	Mark Bright	#120
1997	Eric Battle	#130, #134
1997	Andy Smith	#137
1997	Mel Rubi	#138
1997-1998	Duncan Rouleau	#139-141, #143
1998	Leo Fernandez	#142
1998	Trevor Scott	#145
1998	Lee Moder	#146, #148
1998	Mike Miller	#147
1998	James Fry	#149

== Collected editions ==
=== Oversized hardcovers ===
Title	Material collected	Pages	Publication Date	ISBN
X-Factor: The Original X-Men Omnibus	Avengers #263; Fantastic Four #286; X-Factor #1–26, Annual #1–2; Iron Man Annual #8; Amazing Spider-Man #282; Thor #373–374, 377–378; Power Pack #27, 35; Mephisto Vs. #2; Incredible Hulk #336–337; Classic X-Men #8, 43; Secret Wars II #5; material from Marvel Fanfare #40	1248	July 2024	978-1302956974
X-Men: Mutant Massacre Prelude Omnibus	Avengers #263; Fantastic Four #286; X-Factor #1-8, Annual #1; Iron Man Annual #8; Amazing Spider-Man #282; Uncanny X-Men #194–209, Annual #9-10; New Mutants Special Edition #1; New Mutants Annual #2; Nightcrawler #1-4; Longshot #1-6; material from Marvel Fanfare #40, and Classic X-Men #8, 43	1484	September 2024	978-1302528492
X-Men: Mutant Massacre Omnibus	X-Factor #9-17, Annual #2; Uncanny X-Men #210–219, Annual #11; New Mutants #46; Thor #373–374, 377–378; Power Pack #27; Daredevil #238; Fantastic Four vs. The X-Men #1-4; X-Men vs. The Avengers #1-4	952	November 2018	978-1302914240
X-Men: Fall of the Mutants	X-Factor #18–26; Uncanny X-Men #220–227; New Mutants #55–61; Captain America #339; Daredevil #252; Fantastic Four #312; Incredible Hulk #336-337, 340; Power Pack #35	824	October 2011	978-0785153122
X-Men: Inferno Prologue	X-Factor #27-32, Annual #3; Uncanny X-Men #228-238, Annual #12; New Mutants #62-70, Annual #4; material from Marvel Age Annual #4, Marvel Fanfare #40	824	December 2014	978-0785192732
Evolutionary War Omnibus	X-Factor Annual #3 (A & C stories only); Punisher Annual #1; Silver Surfer Annual #1; New Mutants Annual #4 (A & C stories only); Amazing Spider-Man Annual #22; Fantastic Four Annual #21; Uncanny X-Men Annual #12 (A & C stories only); Web of Spider-Man Annual #4; West Coast Avengers Annual #3; Spectacular Spider-Man Annual #8; Avengers Annual #17	472	September 2011	0-7851-4464-1
X-Men: Inferno	X-Factor #33–40; Annual #4 (C story only); Uncanny X-Men #239–243; New Mutants #71–73; X-Terminators #1–4	600	June 2009	978-0785137771
Atlantis Attacks Omnibus	X-Factor Annual #4 (A & D stories only); Silver Surfer Annual #2; Iron Man Annual #10; Marvel Comics Presents #26; Uncanny X-Men Annual #13 (A & C stories only); The Amazing Spider-Man Annual #23; Punisher Annual #2; The Spectacular Spider-Man Annual #9; Daredevil Annual #5; Avengers Annual #18; The New Mutants #76, Annual #5 (A & C stories only); Web of Spider-Man Annual #5; Avengers West Coast #56, Annual #4; Thor Annual #14; Fantastic Four Annual #22	552	February 2009	0-7851-4492-7
Acts of Vengeance Crossovers Omnibus	X-Factor #49–50; Wolverine (1988) #19–20; Uncanny X-Men #256–258; Fantastic Four (1961) #334–336; Dr. Strange, Sorcerer Supreme (1988) #11–13; Incredible Hulk (1968) #363; Punisher (1987) #28–29; Punisher War Journal (1988) #12–13; Marc Spector: Moon Knight (1989) #8–10; Daredevil (1964) #275–276; Power Pack (1984) #53; Alpha Flight (1983) #79–80; New Mutants (1983) #84–86; Damage Control (1989) #1–4; and Web of Spider-Man #64–65	752	August 2011	978-0-7851-4488-5
X-Men: Days of Future Past	X-Factor Annual #5 (A story only); Uncanny X-Men #141–142, Annual #14; New Mutants Annual #6 (A story only); material from Fantastic Four Annual #23; Excalibur #52, #66–67; Wolverine: Days of Future Past #1–3; material from Hulk: Broken Worlds #2	392	March 2014	978-0785184423
X-Men: X-Tinction Agenda	X-Factor #60–62; Uncanny X-Men #235–238 & #270–272; New Mutants #95–97	304	August 2011	978-0785155317
X-Men by Chris Claremont and Jim Lee Omnibus Vol. 2	X-Factor #63–70; Uncanny X-Men #273–280; X-Men #1–9 and material from #10–11; Ghost Rider #26–27	832	January 2012	978-0785159056
X-Factor by Peter David Omnibus Vol. 1	X-Factor #55, 70–92; X-Factor Annual #7-8; Incredible Hulk #390-392; material from X-Factor Annual #5 (B story only), #6 (C story only); New Mutants Annual #6 (B story only)	848	September 2021	978-1302930653
X-Men: X-Cutioner's Song	X-Factor #84–86; Uncanny X-Men #294–297; X-Men #14–16; X-Force #16–18; Stryfe's Strike File	368	October 2011	978-0785153122
X-Men: Fatal Attractions	X-Factor #87–92; Uncanny X-Men #298–305 and 315; X-Men Unlimited #1–2; X-Force #25; X-Men #25; Wolverine #75; Excalibur #71	816	April 2012	978-0785162452
X-Men: Phalanx Covenant	X-Factor #106; Uncanny X-Men #306, #311–314 and #316–317; Excalibur #78–82; X-Men #36–37; X-Force #38; Wolverine #85; Cable #16	552	February 2014	978-0785185499
X-Men: Age of Apocalypse Omnibus	Factor X #1–4, Uncanny X-Men #320–321, X-Men #40–41, Cable #20, X-Men Alpha, Amazing X-Men #1–4, Astonishing X-Men #1–4, Gambit & the X-Ternals #1–4, Generation Next #1–4, Weapon X #1–4, X-Calibre #1–4, X-Man #1–4, X-Men Omega, Age of Apocalypse: The Chosen and X-Men Ashcan #2	1072	March 2012	978-0785159827
X-Men/Avengers: Onslaught Omnibus	X-Factor #125-126; Cable #32-36; Uncanny X-Men #333-337; X-Force #55, #57-58; X-Man #15-19; X-Men #53-57, Annual '96; X-Men Unlimited #11; Onslaught: X-Men, Onslaught: Marvel Universe, Onslaught: Epilogue; Avengers #401-402; Fantastic Four #415; Incredible Hulk #444-445; Wolverine #104-105; Amazing Spider-Man #415; Green Goblin #12; Spider-Man #72; Iron Man #332; Punisher #11; Thor #502; X-Men: Road to Onslaught #1; material from Excalibur #100, Fantastic Four #416	1296	July 2015	978-0785192626
Civil War: X-Men	X-Factor vol.3 #8–9; Wolverine vol.3 #42-48; Cable & Deadpool #30–32; Civil War: X-Men #1–4; Blade #5; Civil War Files; Civil War: Battle Damage Report	520	March 2011	0-7851-4884-1
X-Men: Messiah Complex	X-Factor vol.3 #25–27; X-Men: Messiah Complex (one-shot); Uncanny X-Men #492–494; X-Men #205–207; New X-Men #44–46;	352	April 2008	0-7851-2899-9
X-Men: Second Coming Revelations	X-Factor #204-206, X-Men: Hope, X-Men: Blind Science, X-Men: Hellbound #1-3	392	September 2010	0-7851-4678-4
X-Factor by Peter David Omnibus Vol. 2	Madrox #1-5; X-Factor Vol. 3 #1-20, 21-24 (A stories), 25–39; X-Factor: The Quick and the Dead; X-Factor Special: Layla Miller; She-Hulk #31	1128	November 2022	978-1302945220
X-Factor by Peter David Omnibus Vol. 3	X-Factor Vol. 3 #40-50, #200-232 and #224.1; and Nation X: X-Factor	1160	August 2023	978-1302953300

=== Trade paperbacks ===
==== Epic Collections ====
Title	Material collected	Publication date	ISBN
X-Factor Epic Collection Volume 1: Genesis & Apocalypse	Avengers #263; Fantastic Four #286; X-Factor #1-9; X-Factor Annual #1; Iron Man Annual #8; Amazing Spider-Man #282; Material from Classic X-Men #8 and #43	May 2016	ISBN 978-1302900687
X-Factor Epic Collection Volume 3: Angel of Death	X-Factor #21-36, X-Factor Annual #3, Power Pack #35	May 2021	ISBN 978-1302927103
X-Factor Epic Collection Volume 4: Judgment War	X-Factor #37-50, X-Factor Annual #4, Uncanny X-Men #242-243	June 2023	
X-Factor Epic Collection Volume 7: All-New, All-Different X-Factor	X-Factor 71–83, X-Factor Annual #7; Incredible Hulk #390-392	December 2018	ISBN 978-1302913861
X-Factor Epic Collection Volume 8: X-Aminations	X-Factor #84-100, X-Factor Annual #8	November 2019	ISBN 978-1302920579
X-Factor Epic Collection Volume 9: Afterlives	X-Factor #101-111, X-Factor Annual #9, Spider-Man & X-Factor: Shadowgames #1-3, X-Force #38, Excalibur #82	April 2022	ISBN 978-1302934514

==== Volume 1 ====
Title	Material collected	Publication date	ISBN
Essential X-Factor Vol. 1	X-Factor #1–16, Annual #1; Avengers #263; Fantastic Four #286; The Mighty Thor #373–374; Power Pack #27 (black and white print)	November 2005	0-7851-1886-1
Essential X-Factor Vol. 2	X-Factor #17–35, Annual #2; Thor #378 (black and white print)	January 2007	0-7851-2099-8
Essential X-Factor Vol. 3	X-Factor #36–50, Annual #3; Uncanny X-Men #242–243 (black and white print)	December 2009	0-7851-3078-0
Essential X-Factor vol. 4	X-Factor #51–59, Annual #4–5; X-Factor: Prisoner of Love; Marvel Fanfare #50; material from Fantastic Four Annual # 23, New Mutants Annual #6, Uncanny X-Men Annual #14 (black and white print)	February 2012	978-0785162858
Essential X-Factor vol. 5	X-Factor #60–70, Annual #6; Uncanny X-Men #270–272, 280; material from Uncanny X-Men Annual #15, New Mutants #95–97, material from New Mutants Annual #7 (black and white print)	December 2012	978-0785163534
X-Men: Phoenix Rising	Avengers #263; Fantastic Four #286; X-Factor #1; and Classic X-Men #8 and #43	June 2009	0-7851-3948-6
X-Factor: Genesis and Apocalypse	X-Factor #1–9 and Annual #1; Avengers #263; Fantastic Four #286; Iron Man Annual #8; Amazing Spider-Man #282; and Material from Classic X-Men #8 and #43	March 2017	978-1302900687
X-Men: Mutant Massacre	X-Factor #9–11; Uncanny X-Men #210–213; New Mutants #46; Thor #373–374; Power Pack #27	October 2001	0-7851-0224-8
X-Men: Mutations	X-Factor #15, 24–25; Amazing Adventures vol. 2, #11, 17; Uncanny X-Men #256–258	October 1996	0-7851-0197-7
X-Men: The Fall of the Mutants	X-Factor #24–26; Uncanny X-Men #224–226; New Mutants #59–61	February 2002	0-7851-0825-4
X-Men: Inferno	X-Factor #36–39; Uncanny X-Men #239–243; New Mutants #71–73	December 1996	0-7851-0222-1
X-Men: X-Tinction Agenda	X-Factor #60–62; Uncanny X-Men #270–272; New Mutants #95–97	December 1998	0-7851-0053-9
X-Factor Forever	X-Factor #63–64; X-Factor Forever #1–5	November 2010	978-0785147992
X-Men Epic Collection Volume 19: Mutant Genesis	X-Men Annual #15; X-Factor #65-70; Uncanny X-Men #278-280; X-Men #1-3; Material from New Mutants Annual #7; X-Factor Annual #6	December 2017	ISBN 978-1302903916
X-Factor: Visionaries Peter David Vol. 1	X-Factor #71–75	December 2005	0-7851-1872-1
X-Factor: Visionaries Peter David Vol. 2	X-Factor #76–78; Incredible Hulk #390–392	March 2007	0-7851-2456-X
X-Factor: Visionaries Peter David Vol. 3	X-Factor #79–83, Annual #7	October 2007	0-7851-2457-8
X-Factor: Visionaries Peter David Vol. 4	X-Factor #84–89, Annual #8	June 2008	0-7851-2745-3
X-Men: X-Cutioner's Song	X-Factor #84–86; Uncanny X-Men #294–296; X-Men #14–16; X-Force #16–18	May 1994	0-7851-0025-3
X-Men: Fatal Attractions	X-Factor #92; X-Force #25; Uncanny X-Men #304; X-Men #25; Wolverine #75; Excalibur #71	August 2000	0-7851-0748-7
The Origin of Generation X: Tales of the Phalanx Covenant	X-Factor #106; Uncanny X-Men #316–317; X-Men vol. 2, #36–37; X-Force #38; Excalibur #82; Wolverine vol. 2, #85; Cable #16; Generation X #1	June 2001	0-7851-0216-7
X-Men: Legion Quest	X-Factor #109; Uncanny X-Men #320–321; X-Men vol. 2, #40–41	March 1996	0-7851-0179-9
X-Men: Prelude to the Age of Apocalypse	X-Factor #108–109; Uncanny X-Men #319–321; X-Men (vol. 2) #38–41; Cable #20; X-Men: Age of Apocalypse Ashcan Edition	May 2011	978-0-7851-5508-9
X-Men: The Complete Onslaught Epic Vol. 2	X-Factor #125–126; Excalibur #100; Fantastic Four #415; Amazing Spider-Man #415; Sensational Spider-Man #8; Spider-Man #72; Green Goblin #12; Punisher #11; Wolverine #104; X-Man #17; X-Men #55; Uncanny X-Men #336; X-Force #58	June 2008	0-7851-2824-7

==== Volume 2 ====
Title	Material collected	Publication date	ISBN
X-Factor Vol. 1: The Mountaintop	X-Factor Vol. 2 #1–4	June 4, 2003	978-0785110163

==== Volume 3 ====
Title	Material collected	Publication date	ISBN
Madrox: Multiple Choice	Madrox #1–5 (prelude to X-Factor vol. 3)	April 2005	0-7851-1500-5
X-Factor: The Longest Night	X-Factor vol. 3, #1–6	March 2007	0-7851-1817-9
X-Factor: Life and Death Matters	X-Factor vol. 3, #7–12	August 2007	0-7851-2146-3
X-Factor: Many Lives of Madrox	X-Factor vol. 3, #13–17	November 2007	0-7851-2359-8
X-Factor: Heart of Ice	X-Factor vol. 3, #18–24	April 2008	0-7851-2360-1
X-Men: Endangered Species	X-Men (vol. 2) #200–204; Uncanny X-Men #488–491; New X-Men (vol. 2) #40–42; X-Factor (vol. 3) #21–24; X-Men: Endangered Species one-shot	????	ISBN 978-0785128205
X-Men: Messiah Complex	X-Factor vol. 3, #25–27; Uncanny X-Men #492–494; X-Men #205–207; New X-Men #44–46; X-Men: Messiah Complex – Mutant Files	November 2008	0-7851-2320-2
X-Factor: The Only Game in Town	X-Factor vol. 3, #28–32; X-Factor: The Quick and the Dead	January 2009	0-7851-2863-8
X-Factor: Secret Invasion	X-Factor vol. 3, #33–38; She-Hulk vol. 2, #31	June 2009	0-7851-2865-4
X-Factor: Time and a Half	X-Factor vol. 3, #39–45	December 2009	0-7851-3836-6
X-Factor: Overtime	X-Factor vol. 3, #46–50; X-Factor: Layla Miller	December 2009	0-7851-3837-4
X-Factor: The Invisible Woman Has Vanished	X-Factor #200–203	June 2010	0-7851-4657-1
X-Factor: Second Coming	X-Factor #204–206; Nation X: X Factor	September 2010	0-7851-4892-2
X-Factor: Happenings in Vegas	X-Factor #207–212	March 2011	0-7851-4658-X
X-Factor: Scar Tissue	X-Factor #213–219	June 2011	0-7851-5283-0
X-Factor: Hard Labor	X-Factor #220–224	November 2011	0-7851-5285-7
X-Factor: Super Unnatural	X-Factor #224.1, 225–228	February 2012	0-7851-6058-2
X-Factor: They Keep Killing Jamie Madrox	X-Factor #229–232	June 2012	0-7851-6060-4
X-Factor: Together Again for the First Time	X-Factor #233–236, Wolverine 52 (1992)	November 2012	0-7851-6063-9
X-Factor: The Road to Redemption	X-Factor #237–240	December 2012	0-7851-6413-8
X-Factor: Breaking Points	X-Factor #241–245	March 2013	0-7851-6512-6
X-Factor: Short Stories	X-Factor #246–249	March 2013	0-7851-6699-8
X-Factor: Hell On Earth War	X-Factor #250–256	July 2013	0-7851-6700-5
X-Factor: The End of X-Factor	X-Factor #257–262	January 2014	978-0785167013
X-Factor: The Complete Collection Volume 1	Madrox #1–5 (prelude to X-Factor vol. 3); X-Factor vol. 3, #1–12	January 2014	0-7851-5438-8
X-Factor: The Complete Collection Volume 2	X-Factor vol. 3, #13–24; X-Factor vol. 3, #28–32; X-Factor: The Quick And The Dead #1; X-Factor Special: Layla Miller #1	May 2014	0-7851-5439-6

==== All-New X-Factor ====
Title	Material collected	Publication date	ISBN
All-New X-Factor, Vol. 1: Not Brand X	All-New X-Factor #1–6	July 1, 2014	Paperback: 978-0785188162
All-New X-Factor, Vol. 2: Change of Decay	All-New X-Factor #7–12	October 28, 2014	Paperback: 978-0785188179
All-New X-Factor, Vol. 3: Axis	All-New X-Factor #13–20	March 31, 2015	Paperback: 978-0785188186

==== Volume 4 ====
Title	Material collected	Pages	Publication date	ISBN
X-Factor by Leah Williams – Volume 1	X-Factor (vol. 4) #1–3, 5	128	December 8, 2020	Paperback: 978-1302921842
X-Factor by Leah Williams – Volume 2	X-Factor (vol. 4) #6–10	136	August 31, 2021	Paperback: 978-1302921859
