= Mannen =

Mountain in Møre og Romsdal, Norway

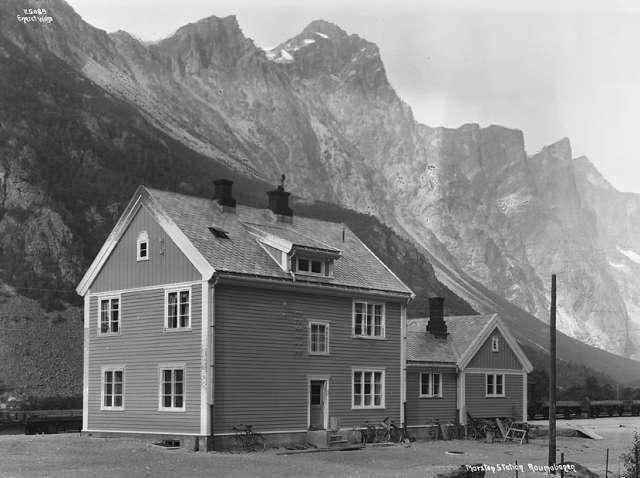
- Marstein Station along the Rauma Line in Norway, just after its 1924 opening, with Mannen as the left peak in the background. The station began operations on 30 November 1924 and was finally closed on 29 May 2012. Photo by Anders Beer Wilse, 1924

Highest point
- Elevation: 1,294 m (4,245 ft)
- Prominence: 13 m (43 ft)
- Parent peak: Breitinden
- Isolation: 1.3 km (0.81 mi)
- Coordinates: 62.4557°N 7.7720°E

Geography
- Interactive map of the mountain
- Location: Møre og Romsdal, Norway

Mannen (lit. 'The Man') is a mountain in Rauma Municipality in Møre og Romsdal county, Norway. The 1,294-metre (4,245 ft) tall mountain is located just west of Horgheim, along the river Rauma in the Romsdalen valley. Mannen has a distinctive needle peak. The mountain's shape has been compared to an enormous seated goose that looks out over the Rauma valley, from which it can easily be seen. The mountainside is unstable and has been closely monitored since 2009 due to the risk of a major landslide.

== Overview ==
A major landslide of up to 100,000,000 cubic metres (130,000,000 yd^{3}) of material is said to be impending on the unstable mountainside, so an emergency preparedness service, the Åknes/Tafjord intermunicipal company (IKS), has closely monitored the area since 2009. Even a smaller slide of about 2,000,000 cubic metres (2,600,000 yd^{3}) could cross the valley floor, potentially devastating buildings and damaging the Rauma Line railway and European route E136. Such an event could also partially or completely dam up the river Rauma, creating major disruption and a flooding hazard.

During the autumn of 2014, observers became aware of an abnormally large shifting of a portion of the mountain. While it normally shifts by 1–2 centimetres (0.39–0.79 in) per year, for three weeks that year the movement averaged about 7 millimetres (0.28 in) per day. As a precaution, on October 22 several houses potentially in the path of a landslide were evacuated and the Rauma Line stopped its four-times-a-day rail service.

During the night of 28 October 2014, the highest part of the mountain shifted as much as 6 centimetres (2.4 in). The mountain's slippage was three times as much as the previous night's measurement, and it was the largest motion the observers had seen to date. Geologist Lars Harald Blikra told a news conference that the lower part of the mountain has also increased its rate of motion.

During 19 and 20 September 2015, the upper parts of the mountain began to shift quickly again, moving 7 centimetres (2.8 in) in one day.

Total movement [cm] recorded at Mannen during October-November 2014.
Date	Centimetres (% change from two days previously)
6 Oct.	0
8 Oct.	0
10 Oct.	1
12 Oct.	2(+100%)
14 Oct.	3(+50%)
16 Oct.	3(0%)
18 Oct.	4(+33.3%)
20 Oct.	4(0%)
22 Oct.	6(+50%)
24 Oct.	7(+16.7%)
26 Oct.	9(+28.6%)
28 Oct.	11(+22.2%)
30 Oct.	17(+54.5%)
1 Nov.	20(+17.6%)
3 Nov.	23(+15%)
5 Nov.	25(+8.7%)
7 Nov.	26(+4%)
9 Nov.	27(+3.8%)

In September 2018, 60 centimetres (24 in) of movement was recorded during 24 hours, the highest measured. Various movements from 2014-2018 triggered a "red alert" status, causing the temporary evacuation of nearby residents and railway closures.

On 5 September 2019, a very large landslide took place from Mannen. In total 54,400 cubic metres (71,200 yd^{3}) fell that day, in addition to 15,000 cubic metres (20,000 yd^{3}) which has fallen as small rockfalls during the previous years. After this landslide, some smaller parts among the debris is still unstable but will not cause a large landslide. It was said that it was the correct action to close the railway and evacuate residents at every one of the 16 red alerts, even if the landslide did not damage any house or the railway.

== Name ==
The name is the definite form of mann which means 'man' (so mannen means 'the Man'). It is common to compare mountains with persons in Norwegian place names.

== See also ==
- List of mountains of Norway
