= List of Flight members =

Alpha Flight members are comic book characters in the Marvel Comics universe, featured mainly in the Alpha Flight series. In the comics, the Flight teams were created by Department H and tasked with protecting Canada.

== The Flight ==
Character	Real name	Joined in	Notes/current status
The Flight The team that would be split into Alpha through Gamma Flights was led by Wolverine. Their first mission is seen in Alpha Flight Special #1 (1992).
Wolverine	James "Logan" Howlett	Alpha Flight Special #1 (1992)	
Groundhog	Sean Benard	Alpha Flight Special #1 (1992)	Quit after the battle with Egghead's Emissaries of Evil.
Saint Elmo	Saint Elmo	Alpha Flight Special #1 (1992)	Died in Alpha Flight Special #1 (1992)
Smart Alec	Alexander Thorne	Alpha Flight Special #1 (1992)	Died in Alpha Flight, vol. 1 #46
Snowbird	Narya	Alpha Flight Special #1 (1992)	
Stitch	Jodi Furman	Alpha Flight Special #1 (1992)	Left the team under undisclosed circumstances
Wild Child Weapon Omega (formerly) Wildheart (formerly)	Kyle Gibney	Alpha Flight, vol. 1 #127 (1993)	Later revealed to have been a Flight member

== Alpha Flight ==
=== Original ===
Character	Real name	Joined in	Notes/current status
Original Alpha Flight The team as it debuted in X-Men, vol. 1 #120 (1979).
Guardian Weapon Alpha (formerly) Vindicator (formerly)	James MacDonald Hudson	X-Men, vol. 1 #109 (1978)	Currently working simultaneously with J.A.N.U.S.
Aurora	Jeanne-Marie Beaubier	X-Men, vol. 1 #120 (1979)	
Northstar	Jean-Paul Beaubier	X-Men, vol. 1 #120 (1979)	
Sasquatch	Walter Langkowski	X-Men, vol. 1 #120 (1979)	Died in Immortal Hulk #21 (2019)
Shaman	Michael Twoyoungmen	X-Men, vol. 1 #120 (1979)	Currently working simultaneously with Stranger Academy
Snowbird	Narya/Anne McKenzie	X-Men, vol. 1 #120 (1979)	

==== Recruits ====
Character	Real name	Joined in	Notes/current status
Alpha Flight, volume 1 recruits
Marrina	Marrina Smallwood	Alpha Flight, vol. 1 #1 (1983)	Married Namor the Sub-Mariner in Alpha Flight, vol. 1 #40; killed by Namor after she mutated in Avengers vol. 1 #291-293; resurrected in Chaos War: Alpha Flight; member of the re-formed Alpha Flight
Puck	Eugene Milton Judd	Alpha Flight, vol. 1 #1 (1983)	Current member of Gamma Flight
Nemesis Vindicator (formerly) Guardian (formerly)	Heather MacNeil Hudson	Alpha Flight, vol. 1 #17 (1984)	Died in New Avengers, vol. 1 #16; resurrected in Chaos War: Alpha Flight; betrayed the re-formed Alpha Flight and joined the Canadian government's new Alpha Strike team; rejoined as the fourth Nemesis in vol.5 #1
Talisman	Elizabeth Twoyoungmen	Alpha Flight, vol. 1 #20 (1985)	Former member of the government-sponsored Omega Flight team
Box	Roger Bochs	Alpha Flight, vol. 1 #24 (1985)	Died in Alpha Flight, vol. 1 #49
Transmutator/Box	Madison Jeffries	Alpha Flight, vol. 1 #28 (1985)	Current member of the X-Men and X-Club
Diamond Lil	Lillian Crawley-Jeffries	Alpha Flight, vol. 1 #73 (1989)	Married Madison Jeffries after Alpha Flight, vol. 1 #105; died in X-Force, vol. 3 #23
Windshear	Colin Ashworth Hume	Alpha Flight, vol. 1 #95 (1991)	Depowered on M-Day; currently retired
Weapon Omega	Kyle Gibney	Alpha Flight, vol. 1 #102 (1991)	Last seen as member of Dark X-Men (2009)
Nemesis	Jane Thorne	Alpha Flight, vol. 1 #125 (1993)	Succeeded by Amelia Weatherly
Wyre		Alpha Flight, vol. 1 #125 (1993)	

=== Re-formed (Volume 2) ===
Character	Real name	Joined in	Notes/current status
Alpha Flight, volume 2 recruits The team that debuted in Alpha Flight, vol. 2 #1 (1997)
Vindicator Guardian (formerly)	"James MacDonald Hudson"	Alpha Flight, vol. 2 #1 (1997)	Younger synthoid duplicate of James Hudson; died in Wolverine, vol. 2 #143 (1999)
Flex	Adrian Corbo	Alpha Flight, vol. 2 #1 (1997)	Depowered on M-Day
Manbot	Bernie Lachenay	Alpha Flight, vol. 2 #1 (1997)	
Murmur	Arlette Truffaut	Alpha Flight, vol. 2 #1 (1997)	Depowered on M-Day
Radius	Jared Corbo	Alpha Flight, vol. 2 #1 (1997)	Depowered on M-Day, as noted in Official Handbook of the Marvel Universe #8
Sasquatch		Alpha Flight, vol. 2 #1 (1997)	Actual Sasquatch mistaken for Walter Langkowski; died in Alpha Flight, vol. 2 #12 (1998)
Sunfire	Shiro Yoshida	Alpha Flight, vol. 2 #4 (1997)	
Ghost Girl	Lilli Stephens	Alpha Flight, vol. 2 #20 (1999)	
Earthmover	Charles "Chuck" Moss	Uncanny X-Men #421 (2003)	Apprentice to Shaman

=== "All-New, All-Different" Alpha Flight (Volume 3) ===
Character	Real name	Joined in	Notes/current status
Alpha Flight, volume 3 recruits The team as it debuted in Alpha Flight, vol. 3 #2 (2004)
Centennial	Rutherford Princeton	Alpha Flight, vol. 3 #2 (2004)	Died sometime off panel, as described in Alpha Flight, vol. 3 #12; succeeded by Heather Hudson
Major Mapleleaf	Louis Sadler Jr.	Alpha Flight, vol. 3 #2 (2004)	Died in New Avengers, vol. 1 #16
Nemesis	Amelia Weatherly	Alpha Flight, vol. 3 #2 (2004)	Died sometime off panel, as described in Alpha Flight, vol. 3 #12
Puck	Zuzha Yu	Alpha Flight, vol. 3 #2 (2004)	Died in New Avengers, vol. 1 #16
Yukon Jack	Yukotujakzurjimozoata	Alpha Flight, vol. 3 #2 (2004)	Married the time-displaced Snowbird and retired
Mar		Alpha Flight, vol. 3 #7 (2004)	A young member of Marrina's species

=== Fall of X (Volume 5) ===
Character	Real name	Joined in	Notes/current status
Alpha Flight, volume 5 recruits
Fang	Akihiro	Alpha Flight, vol. 5 #1 (2023)	Died in Wolverine, vol. 7 #41; resurrected as Hellverine in Hellverine #1

== Alpha Flight temporal copies ==
Character	Real name	Joined in	Notes/current status
Alpha Flight from the past Temporal copies of Alpha Flight members from the past are brought to the present in Alpha Flight, vol. 3 #12 (2005). They have since left the team, presumably returning to their own timeline.
Aurora	Jeanne-Marie Beaubier	Alpha Flight, vol. 3 #12 (2005)	Current status unrevealed
Guardian	James MacDonald Hudson	Alpha Flight, vol. 3 #12 (2005)	Current status unrevealed
Northstar	Jean-Paul Beaubier	Alpha Flight, vol. 3 #12 (2005)	Current status unrevealed
Puck	Eugene Judd	Alpha Flight, vol. 3 #12 (2005)	Current status unrevealed
Shaman	Michael Twoyoungmen	Alpha Flight, vol. 3 #12 (2005)	Current status unrevealed
Snowbird	Narya	Alpha Flight, vol. 3 #12 (2005)	Current status unrevealed
Vindicator	Heather Hudson	Alpha Flight, vol. 3 #12 (2005)	Current status unrevealed

== Beta Flight ==
Character	Real name	Joined in	Notes/current status
Secondary Team The team as it was revealed in Alpha Flight, vol. 1 #1 (1983).
Box	Roger Bochs	Alpha Flight, vol. 1 #1 (1983)	
Flashback	Gardner Monroe	Alpha Flight, vol. 1 #1 (1983)	
Marrina	Marrina Smallwood	Alpha Flight, vol. 1 #1 (1983)	
Puck	Eugene Judd	Alpha Flight, vol. 1 #1 (1983)	
Trainee Team Originally re-formed as a trainee team, Beta Flight was later promoted to going on missions separate from Alpha Flight.
Purple Girl/Persuasion	Kara Killgrave	Alpha Flight, vol. 1 #42 (1987)	Current member of the Canadian government's new Alpha Strike team as Purple Woman
Manikin	Whitman Knapp	Alpha Flight, vol. 1 #50 (1987)	
Goblyn	Goblyn Dean	Alpha Flight, vol. 1 #55 (1988)	
Pathway	Laura Dean	Alpha Flight, vol. 1 #55 (1988)	
Talisman	Elizabeth Twoyoungmen	Alpha Flight, vol. 1 #95 (1991)	Currently teaching the Mystic arts in Strange Academy
Witchfire	Ananym	Alpha Flight, vol. 1 #95 (1991)	Currently seeking to rule Limbo
Feedback	Albert Louis	Alpha Flight, vol. 1 #126 (1993)	Apparently died in Marauders vol. 2 #11 (2023), revealed to be alive in Alpha Flight vol. 5 # 1 (2023)
Secret Trainee Team Secret, captive trainee team that was released following the death of General Clarke.
Ghost Girl	Lilli Stephens	Alpha Flight, vol. 2 #8 (1998)	Joined Alpha Flight after her release
Flinch	Toby Wood	Alpha Flight, vol. 2 #14 (1998)	
Ouija	Bill Astin	Alpha Flight, vol. 2 #14 (1998)	
Secondary Team The team as it debuted in a flashback in Wolverine, vol. 2 #142 (1999).
Vindicator	"James MacDonald Hudson"	Wolverine, vol. 2 #142 (1999)	Younger synthoid duplicate of James Hudson; team leader
Flex	Adrian Corbo	Wolverine, vol. 2 #142 (1999)	
Ghost Girl	Lilli Stephens	Wolverine, vol. 2 #142 (1999)	
Manbot	Bernie Lachenay	Wolverine, vol. 2 #142 (1999)	
Murmur	Arlette Truffaut	Wolverine, vol. 2 #142 (1999)	
Radius	Jared Corbo	Wolverine, vol. 2 #142 (1999)	

== Gamma Flight ==
Character	Real name	Joined in	Notes/current status
Trainee Team The team as revealed in Alpha Flight, vol. 1 #1 (1983).
Diamond Lil	Lillian Crawley	Alpha Flight, vol. 1 #1 (1983)	
Madison Jeffries	Madison Jeffries	Alpha Flight, vol. 1 #1 (1983)	
Smart Alec	Alec Thorne	Alpha Flight, vol. 1 #1 (1983)	
Wild Child	Kyle Gibney	Alpha Flight, vol. 1 #1 (1983)	
Additional Revealed Members
Marrina	Marrina Smallwood		Revealed to have been a member in Alpha Flight, vol. 1 #2 (1983)
Primary Government Team The team as it debuted in Alpha Flight, vol. 1 #76 (1989).
Auric	Zhao Tang	Alpha Flight, vol. 1 #76 (1989)	
Nemesis	"Jane Doe"	Alpha Flight, vol. 1 #76 (1989)	
Silver	Jimon Tang	Alpha Flight, vol. 1 #76 (1989)	
Wild Child	Kyle Gibney	Alpha Flight, vol. 1 #76 (1989)	
Witchfire	Ananym	Alpha Flight, vol. 1 #76 (1989)	

== Omega Flight ==
Character	Real name	Joined in	Notes/current status
Government Team The team as revealed in Omega Flight #1 (2008).
Arachne	Julia Carpenter	Omega Flight #1 (2008)	
Guardian/Weapon Omega	Michael Pointer	Omega Flight #1 (2008)	
Sasquatch	Walter Langkowski	Omega Flight #1 (2008)	
U.S. Agent	John Walker	Omega Flight #1 (2008)	
Beta Ray Bill		Omega Flight #1 (2008)	Honorary member
Shroud	Maximillian Quincy Coleridge	Marvel Comics Presents #8 (2009)	
