= Aurora (comics) =

Marvel Comics superhero

- Aurora. Art by John Byrne.

Publication information
- Publisher: Marvel Comics
- First appearance: The Uncanny X-Men #120 (April 1979)
- Created by: Chris Claremont; John Byrne

In-story information
- Alter ego: Jeanne-Marie Beaubier
- Species: Human mutant
- Place of origin: Earth-616
- Team affiliations: Alpha Flight; Beta Flight; Brotherhood of Mutants; Gamma Flight; NASA; Royal Canadian Mounted Police; The 198; The Children; Weapon X; X-Factor; X-Men; Marauders
- Notable aliases: Sister Beaubier
- Abilities: Invisibility to technological detection; Accelerated metabolism; G-Force compensation; Molecular acceleration; Gestalt Photokinesis; Heightened reflexes; Enhanced durability; Superhuman speed; Photokinesis; Flight

Aurora (French: Aurore) (Jeanne-Marie Beaubier) is a superhero appearing in American comic books published by Marvel Comics. Created by Chris Claremont and John Byrne, the character first appeared in The Uncanny X-Men #120 (April 1979). Aurora is a member of the Canadian superhero team, Alpha Flight.

Aurora is the twin sister of Northstar and the former lover of Sasquatch and Wild Child. The character struggled with a dissociative identity disorder for years leading to two distinctive personalities: the quiet, religious Jeanne-Marie and the outgoing, heroic, uninhibited Aurora. Aurora and Northstar worked together for years as part of Alpha Flight, including dealing with Beaubier's struggles with her personality disorders. She was briefly a member of the X-Men and also participated in the Weapon X program in an attempt to gain control of her splintered personalities.

Aurora would later join teams such as X-Factor and the Marauders during the Krakoan Age.

== Publication history ==
Aurora first appeared in The Uncanny X-Men #120 (April 1979) as a member of Alpha Flight, and was created by Chris Claremont and John Byrne.

She appeared as a main character in Alpha Flight (Vol. 1-2; 4-5), Weapon X (Vol. 2), Captain Marvel (Vol. 9), X-Factor (Vol. 4), and Marauders (Vol. 2).

== Fictional character biography ==
Jeanne-Marie Beaubier was born in Montreal, Quebec, Canada. She and her twin brother Jean-Paul were separated in infancy after their parents died. Jean-Paul was adopted by Mr. and Mrs. Louis Martin, cousins of their mother. The Martins could not afford to adopt Jeanne-Marie as well and arranged for Jeanne-Marie to be raised at Madame DuPont's School for Girls in Laval, Quebec, a reactionary religious school. Soon afterward, the Martins moved to Northern Quebec. The Martins were killed in an accident several years later and Jean-Paul was placed in a foster home, unaware that he had a sister.

Extremely nervous and introverted, Jeanne-Marie was miserable at Madame DuPont's School. At the age of thirteen, she attempted suicide by throwing herself from the roof of one of the school's buildings. Instead of falling to her death, Jeanne-Marie discovered that she could fly at great speed. Unaware that she was a mutant, Jeanne-Marie believed that her flight was the result of a divine miracle. The next morning, she explained to the school's headmistress what she believed had happened. Believing the young girl to be guilty of blasphemy, the headmistress had Jeanne-Marie severely disciplined. This incident (and possibly other abuse) triggered a dissociative identity disorder in Jeanne-Marie; a second personality, extroverted and far more uninhibited, emerged. Under the influence of this second personality, Jeanne-Marie secretly left the school that same night. Returning three days later, she had no memory of where she had been or what she had done and she was again physically punished. The resulting trauma was so great that Jeanne-Marie repressed her second personality.

=== Alpha Flight ===
Five years later, Jeanne-Marie's application to become a teacher of history and geography at the school was accepted. By this time, Jeanne-Marie had adjusted to life at the school and her everyday personality was that of a prim, proper, repressed woman. The same night that her application was accepted, her second personality re-emerged and she left to enjoy herself in Montreal. Confronted by muggers, she knocked one unconscious by moving at superhuman speed (this was the first time that she had used her superhuman powers in five years). The second mugger was halted by Wolverine, who had witnessed the attempted assault. Recognizing that Jeanne-Marie had superhuman powers, Wolverine invited her to go to Ottawa to meet James Hudson, who was organizing a team of superhumanly powerful agents for the Canadian government's Department H. Hudson accepted her as a recruit and reunited her with her brother. After a period of training, both Beaubier siblings joined the team that Hudson created, Alpha Flight, under the code names Aurora and Northstar.

She was later temporarily cured of her multiple personalities. Alongside the X-Men and Alpha Flight, she battled Loki. She was again attacked by Gilded Lily. Aurora was captured by Box, who had gone insane, but was later rescued by Alpha Flight. Loki deceived Aurora into believing that her mother had been an Asgardian Light Elf. The team brought her and Northstar to the place where they once encountered a magical Firefountain; they wanted to heal her mind and Northstar's body. During a battle with dark elves, she cured her brother by giving him all of her light. She was carried off by the elves, but Loki (in an attempt to curry favor with Those Who Sit Above In Shadow) transported her to a convent for safety, who took her in.

Talisman later came to Jeanne-Marie at the convent and transported her to Asgard along with Persuasion, Goblyn and Laura Dean to help rescue Northstar in Alfheim. He had gone to Asgard to explore their half-elf heritage, only to discover that Loki lied about it. Northstar had been trapped on Asgard for months. In battle, Northstar shared the light with Aurora and restored her powers. After their battle with the sorcerer Llan, she rejoined Alpha Flight. Aurora soon discovered that she could now generate a light that bestowed inner peace in others. With Alpha Flight and the Fantastic Four, she fought against Headlok. Headlok mentally manipulated her, causing her to revert to her original split personality, and she then killed Headlok.

=== Resurfacing and rehabilitation ===
In the events leading up her reappearance in Weapon X vol. 2, Aurora's mental health continues to deteriorate and she is later turned into a mind controlled agent of Weapon X. She also engages in an abusive relationship with the Weapon X director, Malcolm Colcord, who frequently beat her. Aurora manages to retaliate against her mind-control by creating a third personality that was unaffected by her situation. She attacks Colcord and manages to escape. In her next appearance, Aurora's mental state becomes unstable to the point that all her personalities agree that suicide is the best solution. She is stopped by the arrival of Northstar, who is under the control of the Children of the Vault, a mysterious group of newly emerged superhumans who seek to destroy mutants, viewing them to be their competition for dominance of the planet. One of the Children, Serafina, places the twins under their control, largely repairing Aurora's fragile psyche, boosting the twins' powers and altering them so that they can generate not only light when in contact with each other, but heat as well.

The twins are sent on a mission to attack the X-Men and retrieve Sabretooth for the Children of the Vault. The twins are able to defeat several of the X-Men and New X-Men until Mystique is able to exploit Aurora's shattered psyche by taking on her image. Iceman manages to incapacitate Aurora while Cable subdues Northstar.

The X-Men take Northstar and Aurora to the S.H.I.E.L.D. Helicarrier in an attempt to fix the mental damage inflicted on the twins. Using their virtual reality equipment the X-Men allowed the twins to relive their lives at an accelerated pace. The process was interrupted near the end of the session by Exodus, creating a telepathic connection between the twins. Using each other's emotional support, they manage to face their inner personal turmoils and regain control of their minds. Aurora and Northstar also gain a higher level of control over their powers, which they use to save Rogue from Frenzy.

They later reappear in the mini-crossover series Secret Invasion: X-Men, joining the X-Men when the Skrull invasion reaches San Francisco.

Aurora next appears in Uncanny X-Men, having formed a snowsporting company with Northstar, Team Northstar Extreme Snowsports. Aurora appears to be living a relatively normal life since regaining control of her mind, working as the joint CEO of the company. She is contacted by Wolverine when he wishes to extend an invitation to Northstar to join X-Men on Utopia.

During one of Aurora's therapy sessions to deal with her disorder, she is given a device to wear on her head for tests, when in actuality, her therapist was bribed by Norman Osborn to use it on her so he could speak with her more dark and violent personality about joining his Dark X-Men. Aurora refuses to be manipulated and leaves, turning on Osborn.

=== Krakoan Age ===
As part of Dawn of X, Aurora was one of the many mutants who joined the mutant nation of Krakoa. Aurora and her brother Northstar were later sent on a flyover scouting mission to investigate a strange island that mysteriously appeared off the southern coast of Krakoa. In their report they mentioned the island being full of giant hostile beasts. Northstar later formed a new iteration of the team X-Factor to investigate Aurora's mysterious death, and she joined the team following her resurrection, beginning a romantic relationship with fellow team member Daken. He kept her secret that her death was actually a suicide to cover up the fact she had murdered a human who was bigoted against mutants. Aurora and Daken later joined Kate Pryde's Marauders team, and after the Fall of X, joined a reformed Alpha Flight to help mutant fugitives escape to Shi'ar space.

== Powers and abilities ==
Northstar and Aurora. Art by Leinil Francis Yu.

Aurora has the powers of flight and superhuman speed and reflexes (theoretically able to approach light-speed. This has never been attempted since if any being or amount of matter were to approach the speed of light in the Solar System, it would wreak devastating havoc on the gravitational forces holding it together). The greater her increase in speed, the more durable her body becomes, but this ability has not been measured.

She also has super-human levels of endurance and stamina that allows her to maintain her super-speed. In an early issue of Alpha Flight, Northstar reveals to readers that Aurora has greater endurance and can fly longer, while he can fly faster in the same period of time. Her strength and reaction time are above-average for a woman of her age and exercise level, yet Aurora usually does not rely on her physical strength while battling opponents, instead using super-speed tricks, like flying someone at great speed until they pass out from lack of oxygen or pummeling them with hundreds of punches a second until they succumb. Aurora also uses her super speed to perform stunts such as creating a cyclone by running in circles, running up walls and across water. She has been shown to breathe while traveling at subsonic speeds.

Originally, while in physical contact with her brother, usually while holding hands, the pair could emit bursts of brilliant white light with an average flash equal in intensity of one million candela. It was generally used to blind their opponents, with the drawback that they could not control its intensity. Experiments performed on Aurora by Walter Langkowski enabled her to generate light independently from Northstar, rendering the side effect that physical contact between the two would temporarily neutralize their powers. Her speed was also greatly reduced to only fly at the speed of sound. With her recent resurrection in a new body, these modifications are gone, enabling the siblings to generate light together and restoring Aurora's previous levels of speed.

Aurora is moderately skilled in hand-to-hand combat using a style utilizing her superhuman speed, and received coaching from Puck and Wolverine.

== Reception ==
=== Critical reception ===
Various websites have listed Aurora as among the fastest characters in Marvel Comics. CBR ranked Aurora 9th in their "10 Most Powerful Members of Canada’s Avengers" list.

Sara Century of SYFY felt that the character was defined by her mental disorder, and that writers poorly handled the topic.

== Other versions ==
An alternate universe version of Aurora appears in Age of Apocalypse as a member of Mister Sinister's Elite Mutant Force. Following the fall of Apocalypse's regime, Aurora and Northstar become fugitives until they are killed by Weapon X and Kirika.

Aurora was killed in the Earth X, Marvel Zombies, Age of X, X-Men: The End, Days of Future Now, and a What If story where she joins the X-Men. Other versions exist in House of M, Ultimate Marvel, and Ruins.

== In other media ==
- Aurora appears in X-Men: The Animated Series, voiced by Jennifer Dale.
  - Aurora makes non-voiced appearances in X-Men '97.
- Aurora appears in Marvel Puzzle Quest.
- Aurora appears in Marvel Snap.
- Aurora received a Marvel Legends figure as part of the Alpha Flight box set.
