= List of Marvel Comics characters: F =

== Joe Face ==
Joseph Facello, known commonly as Joe Face, is a character appearing in American comic books published by Marvel Comics. He was a small time criminal and occasional informant to Spider-Man. Face was killed in the comic story Kraven's Last Hunt.

== Fafnir ==
Fafnir is a character based on the mythological entity of the same name. Fafnir is first encountered in the guise of an old man by Volstagg, who with his companions is currently exploring the ruined realm of Nastrond. Fafnir explains he was the king of Nastrond, which was destroyed by Odin due to the evil nature of its people. Fafnir was left to die, but survived by drinking from a pool of water with magical properties, which transformed him into a dragon. Knowing that Volstagg and his allies were sent by Odin, Fafnir intends to kill them. Thor drives Fafnir into a chasm using his lightning and frees Volstagg.

=== Fafnir in other media ===
Fafnir appears in the Avengers Assemble episode "A Friend in Need".

== Falcona ==
Falcona is an Inhuman with the ability to control birds of prey who is one of several Inhuman criminals found guilty of treason and banished to another dimension. When the Hulk attacks Lockjaw, he teleports the Hulk to the dimension where the evil Inhumans have been banished. Maximus appears and recruits them all as part of his military takeover of Attilan. Maximus seeks a device created by the Inhuman scientist Romnar which can absorb people. The Inhumans use Hulk to gain access to the device, and build a ray gun to use it to attack Black Bolt. The evil Inhumans squabble over the device for their own ideals of conquest, and Black Bolt is able to defeat them. To try to regain Black Bolt's favor, the Inhumans try to stop Hulk as he rampages through Attilan, with Black Bolt ultimately stopping him.

== Falligar the Behemoth ==
Falligar the Behemoth, also known simply as Falligar, is a character appearing in American comic books published by Marvel Comics. He makes a single appearance in Thor: God of Thunder #3 (December 2012).

Falligar is a deity who was among the victims of Gorr the God Butcher. Gorr killed Falligar and left his corpse rotting on the shores of his home planet, with his worshipers surrounding him and praying for his resurrection.

=== Falligar the Behemoth in other media ===
Falligar's corpse appears in Thor: Love and Thunder.

== Famine ==
Famine is the name of several characters appearing in American comic books published by Marvel Comics, usually as one of the Horsemen of Apocalypse.

=== Autumn Rolfson ===
Famine

Publication information
- Publisher: Marvel Comics
- First appearance: X-Factor vol. 1 #12 (October 1986)
- Created by: Louise Simonson (writer); Walt Simonson (artist)

In-story information
- Full name: Autumn Rolfson
- Species: Human mutant
- Team affiliations: Horsemen of Apocalypse
- Notable aliases: Famine
- Abilities: Hydrokinesis

Autumn Rolfson is an anorexic female from Cleveland, Ohio who is recruited as Famine, engaging in combat against the X-Men and X-Factor several times. Rolfson is killed by Archangel while recruiting Genocide.

=== Jeb Lee ===
Famine

Publication information
- Publisher: Marvel Comics
- First appearance: Uncanny X-Force vol. 1 #1 (October 2010)
- Created by: Rick Remender (writer); Jerome Opena (artist)

In-story information
- Full name: Jeb Lee
- Species: Human mutant
- Team affiliations: Horsemen of Apocalypse
- Notable aliases: Famine

Jeb Lee is a Confederate spy who fought during the American Civil War. He marched behind enemy lines disguised as a Union drummer in order to gather information. After the war, he returned home while mistakenly wearing his Union uniform. The Confederates believed him to be a traitor and burned his family alive in front of him. This stimulated his latent mutant powers, the ability to use percussive sound to create a bioauditory cancer, a "living sound" that feeds on the flesh of those who hear it.

=== Famine (First Horseman of Apocalypse) ===
Famine

Publication information
- Publisher: Marvel Comics
- First appearance: Marvel Comics #1000 (October 2019)
- Created by: Jonathan Hickman (writer); Dustin Weaver (artist)

In-story information
- Full name: Famine
- Species: Human mutant
- Team affiliations: Horsemen of Apocalypse
- Partnerships: Apocalypse (father); Genesis (mother)
- Abilities: Hydrokinesis

Famine is the one of four children of Apocalypse and Genesis, born and raised on Okkara. He and his siblings grow up to be the first Horsemen of Apocalypse and fight against the Brood in Ancient Egypt. When the forces of the dimension of Amenth invade Earth and split Okkara into Krakoa and Arakko, Famine, along with his mother, his siblings, all Okkaran mutants, and Arakko, is voluntarily sealed away in Amenth to stop the invasion while Apocalypse remains on Earth. After Genesis becomes Annihilation's new host, Arakko is subjugated and united with the forces of Amenth. Famine and his siblings are sent to Otherworld to attack the province of Dryador and the Starlight Citadel. When Summoner successfully lures Apocalypse to Otherworld, the Horsemen attack and severely wound their father.

While War and Death participate in the X of Swords tournament, Famine and Pestilence serve as regents of Dryador and later fight against the Krakoan mutants to invade Earth. Following the battle and Annihilation's defeat, Famine returns to Amenth.

When Genesis incites a civil war on Arakko, Famine joins his mother there and fights against Storm and her allies. After the war ends, he joins his mother and War in exile on Phobos.

=== Powers and abilities of Famine ===
Autumn Rolfson is a mutant with the power to rot, wither, and decay organic matter. She can cast fields that induce agonizing, extreme hunger pains in people and animals, physically drain the life force of targets through touch which rapidly reducing the targets to a severely emaciated state, and target agricultural centers to destroy entire food supplies instantly.

Apocalypse's son is an Omega-level mutant with the ability to control water, even able to extract it from the bodies of living beings. He is also very long-lived, having been alive for thousands of years.

=== Reception of Famine ===
Jeb Lee has been noted as an underwhelming villain.

=== Famine in other media ===
- The Autumn Rolfson incarnation of Famine appears in X-Men: The Animated Series, voiced by Catherine Gallant. Another incarnation of Famine who served Apocalypse in ancient times made a non-speaking cameo later in the series.
- An original incarnation of Famine appears in X-Men: Evolution as Storm (voiced by Kirsten Williamson).
- Autumn Rolfson / Famine appears in X-Men: Apocalypse, portrayed by Rochelle Okoye. This version served Apocalypse in Ancient Egypt.
- The Jeb Lee incarnation of Famine makes a non-speaking appearance in the X-Men '97 episode "Days of Past Future".
- An original incarnation of Famine appears in Marvel Rivals as Jubilee.

== Fang ==
Fang is the name of several characters appearing in American comic books published by Marvel Comics.

=== Fang (Imperial Guard) ===
- First appearance: X-Men #107 (Oct. 1977)
- Created by: Chris Claremont and Dave Cockrum
- Species: Lupak
- Teams: Imperial Guard
- Abilities: Superhuman senses, strength, speed, stamina, durability, agility, and reflexes; Claws and fangs; Teleportation; Flight; Energy projection/matter manipulation
- Aliases: (second Fang) Nev-Darr

Fang is a Lupak, a wolf-like alien and member of the Royal Elite of the Shi'ar Imperial Guard. Created by Chris Claremont and Dave Cockrum, the character first appeared in X-Men #107 (October 1977). In later appearances, the character develops new abilities, including teleportation, flight, energy projection, and matter manipulation. Like many original members of the Imperial Guard, Fang is the analog of a character from DC Comics' Legion of Super-Heroes: in his case Timber Wolf.

Fang later becomes a "Borderer": a Guardsman stationed on one of the Shi'ar's conquered worlds to help its governor enforce Shi'ar law there. Fang and a small number of other Guardsmen become renegades and turn traitor, betraying the Shi'ar Empire by serving Deathbird in her attempt to overthrow her sister Lilandra Neramani. The Brood interfere with a concussion-style bomb secretly hidden in the midst of the battle. Soon after this incident, Fang is killed when the Brood uses him as a host body for the egg of one of their young. His body is consumed and transformed by the Brood embryo implanted inside him, and the resulting Brood alien later fights Wolverine, who kills it.

Following Fang's death, another Lupak named Nev-Darr is enlisted to replace him. When Nev-Darr is killed, a third one takes his place. According to Fang, the Lupak reproduce through cloning and keep mental templates of their citizens on file. When one of them dies, a new one is made.

=== Tamara Pearson ===
Tamara Pearson is a worker of Ezekiel Sims who once helped him in welcoming Silk into the bunker where they kept her safe from Morlun.

== Fantasia ==
Fantasia is a character in the Marvel Universe. She first appeared in Captain America #352–353 (April–May 1989), and was created by Mark Gruenwald and Kieron Dwyer. The character subsequently appears as Fantasma beginning in The Avengers #319–324 (July–October 1990).

Fantasia was a member of the Supreme Soviets. The team had been sent by the Soviet government to capture the Soviet Super-Soldiers, who were attempting to defect to the United States. Fantasia disguised the team members with an illusion to appear as members of the Avengers: Red Guardian as Captain America, Perun as Thor, Crimson Dynamo as Iron Man, and Sputnik as the Vision. Eventually, the real Captain America defeated the Supreme Soviets and freed the badly wounded Soviet Super-Soldiers.

Fantasia later changed her name to Fantasma when the team became known as the People's Protectorate. Eventually the team broke up and merged with the Soviet Super-Soldiers to form the Winter Guard.

Fantasma is rescued from a time anomaly by the Winter Guard, with her former teammates of the Protectorate on her trail. It is revealed that Fantasma is a Dire Wraith queen, and she aligns herself with the Presence and fights the Winter Guard. She is defeated by banishing her into Limbo again.

Fantasia is a Russian soldier with super-powers. She is skilled in magic, especially in the use of illusions. She has also shown the ability to fly and certain mental abilities.

== Kat Farrell ==
Kat Farrell first appeared in Deadline #1 and was created by Bill Rosemann. A reporter for the Daily Bugle, Farrell is the co-head of The Pulse, a section of the Bugle which focuses on superheroes.

Initially, Farrell is interested in reporting on 'real' heroes, such as police officers and firefighters, and did not like being forced to cover superheroes.

Following six supervillain homicides, Farrell is led to murdered judge Michael Hart, who presided solely over superhero crimes. Hart's wife had also been murdered. The police suspect that it was a double homicide or Hart had killed his wife first. Farrell discovers that Hart had been murdered by the Tinkerer. He had returned, though, with supernatural powers. Paul Swanson, fellow reporter, breaks into her apartment and kills her fish in an attempt to scare her off the case. Undeterred, she nevertheless decides to drop the story regardless to protect Hart.

== Fat Cobra ==
Fat Cobra is a character appearing in American comic books published by Marvel Comics. Created by Ed Brubaker, Matt Fraction, and David Aja, he first appeared in The Immortal Iron Fist #8 (August 2007).

Fat Cobra is a member of the Immortal Weapons who was born 111 years prior to the present on Peng Lai Island, one of the Seven Heavenly Cities. His mother died in childbirth; when he was three months old, his father gave him up to an orphanage due to his immense appetite. At the age of two, Fat Cobra was sent to Earth after the orphanage proved unable to handle his hunger. Fat Cobra went on to become an opera singer before enlisting in the Chinese Civil War. After the war's end, Fat Cobra returned to Peng Lai, where he trained to become a martial artist.

=== Fat Cobra in other media ===
Fat Cobra appears in Hit-Monkey, voiced by Noshir Dalal.

== Fatale ==
Fatale

Publication information
- Publisher: Marvel Comics
- First appearance: The Uncanny X-Men #299 (as Pamela Greenwood) (April 1993); X-Factor #112 (as Fatale) (July 1995)
- Created by: Pamela Greenwood: Scott Lobdell; Brandon Peterson; Fatale: John Francis Moore; Jeff Matsuda

In-story information
- Species: Human mutant
- Team affiliations: X-Cell; Dark Descendants; Brotherhood
- Notable aliases: Pamela Greenwood, Amy Johnson
- Abilities: Depowered, formerly: Teleportation, Light-alteration; Invisibility

Fatale is a supervillain appearing in American comic books published by Marvel Comics. The character primarily appears in comics featuring the X-Men family of characters. She is an assassin who usually works for Dark Beast.

Fatale is one of Europe's finest assassins and Dark Beast's most trusted servant. When Dark Beast becomes interested in the X-Man Bishop, he places Fatale undercover as a waitress under the alias Amy Johnson in Harry's Hideaway, a bar the X-Men often visit, to gather information for him. There she is able to scan Bishop's mind to find information about his ideal woman and changes her appearance to match this image. She takes the name Pamela Greenwood, but fails to get any closer to Bishop. He notices something familiar about Pamela, but never pursues his interest in her.

Dark Beast and Sugar Man order their respective agents Fatale and Scarlett McKenzie to kidnap Havok so that they can brainwash him. Scarlett is able to trick a dazed and confused Havok into coming with her as far as Tokyo, Japan, en route to Genosha, but they are intercepted by Fatale, who has hired the Tatsu clan's ninjas for their help in her mission. Havok is rescued by Yukio and is reclaimed by X-Factor, who had followed the parties involved to Japan, driving off Fatale and Scarlett after a massive battle.

Fatale lost her powers during the "Decimation" storyline. Quicksilver restores Fatale's powers using Terrigen Mist, but its effects prove to be temporary.

== Fearless ==
Fearless (Angela Mitrache) is a character appearing in American comic books published by Marvel Comics. The character was created by writer Tim Seeley and artist Carlos Magno, and made her first appearance in Undeadpool #1 (October 2025).

Angela Mitrache is originally from Silver Spring, Maryland, and was born blind. She was later exposed to the mutagenic X-Virus created by Revelation. Angela gained telepathic and telekinetic abilities and went on to join the Alpha Warriors, a group of aspiring X-Men members. Angela is later killed by Deadpool, who had developed a murderous persona after being exposed to the X-Virus.

== Fen ==
Fen is a character appearing in American comic books published by Marvel Comics. The character, created by Bill Everett, first appeared in Motion Picture Funnies Weekly #1 (April 1939).

Fen is a member of the royal family of Atlantis and the mother of Namor. She is killed by Socus in Namor, the Sub-Mariner #40 (1993).

=== Fen in other media ===
Fen appears in Black Panther: Wakanda Forever, portrayed by María Mercedes Coroy.

== Fer-de-Lance ==
Fer-de-Lance (Teresa Vasquez) was born in San Juan, Puerto Rico. Hired as a personal assassin for Viper, Fer-de-Lance and her allies Puff Adder, Black Racer, and Copperhead, the fourth Serpent Squad, pull a number of bank heists in Las Vegas. Fer-de-Lance is trained in battle with razor-edged claws that retract from her gloves and boots. During one of their casino robberies, Captain America and his allies Falcon, Nomad, and Demolition Man intervene and defeat the group, placing them in jail. Soon after, Fer-de-Lance and the others are rescued by Sidewinder and initiated into the Serpent Society. Fer-de-Lance is secretly a double agent of Viper and allows her to teleport into Serpent Society headquarters.

Fer-de-Lance feigns a friendship with Diamondback during her first night with the Serpent Society, but quickly turns on her when Viper's scheme to overthrow Sidewinder as leader of the criminal organization succeeded. Betraying Sidewinder and Diamondback, Fer-de-Lance finds them hiding in a control room. During the skirmish, Fer-de-Lance lunges at Diamondback, who promptly dodges her attack. Fer-de-Lance, pressing her retractable razors into a computer, suffers an electric shock and was defeated. After Viper abandoned the group of mercenaries, Fer-de-Lance continued to serve with the Serpent Society.

As part of the "All-New, All-Different Marvel," Fer-de-Lance appears as a member of Viper's Serpent Society under its new name Serpent Solutions.

== Ferocia ==
Ferocia was a K'un-L'un wolf whose pack killed Heather Rand outside of K'un-L'un. She was later evolved by the magics of Shirrair and has become a servant of Master Khan under the name Ferocia.

== Feron ==
Feron is the name of two related characters.

=== Feron of Excalibur ===
- First appearance: Excalibur #48 (January 1992)
- Created by: Alan Davis
- Teams: Excalibur
- Further reading: Feron at Comic Vine; Feron at League of Comic Geeks; Feron at Marvel Database

Feron is a wizard and member of Excalibur. The character was created by Alan Davis and first appeared in Excalibur #48 (January 1992).

Feron was trained by an order of monks for the return of Necrom. Feron always levitated with his magic as it was believed when his feet first touched the Earth, he would become host to the Phoenix Force. When Necrom did return, Feron touched the ground but did not become host to the Phoenix, as Rachel Summers was already the host. He then joined Excalibur to defeat Necrom. Feron went missing after a mishap with magic caused him to absorb Meggan's powers and he turned to water and went missing. He would reappear, disgruntled by the fact nobody on Excalibur seemed to search for him. He took on the guise of Executioner and turned the Crazy Gang against Excalibur. He was unmasked and he settled his differences with the team, even attending the wedding of Meggan and Brian Braddock. The team disbanded soon after.

=== Feron (ancestor) ===
Feron is an ancestor of Feron of Excalibur and a once student of Necrom hailing from Earth-148. The character was created by Alan Davis and first appeared in Excalibur #50 (March 1992).

The Sorcerer Supreme of Earth-148, Necrom invited his students (Feron and Merlyn) to help create a matrix of magical energy. The group traveled to Earth-616, where Feron contacted the Phoenix Force and used its power to create towers on every Earth across the omniverse. Necrom then tried to drain Feron of the force, so he retaliated. Necrom took part of the Force, and Feron dedicated his life to prepare himself and his ancestors (including Feron) for his return.

== Connie Ferrari ==
- Further reading: Connie Ferrari at the Comic Book DB (archived from the original); Connie Ferrari at the Grand Comics Database

Connie Ferrari is a character appearing in American comic books published by Marvel Comics. The character, created by Mark Waid and Andy Kubert, first appeared in Captain America (vol. 3) #20 (August 1999).

Connie Ferrari was a noted New York attorney. She met and started dating Steve Rogers who, unbeknownst to her, was actually Captain America. Their relationship would soon hit a snag due to Ferrari's continual defense towards criminals, most notably her brother David who was the Answer. When Ferrari found out that Rogers and Cap were one and the same, she felt betrayed and broke up with him. Rogers later worked up the courage to apologize to her and the two parted as friends.

Later, Ferrari became the Avengers' attorney and gained an assistant named Amy. She seems to somewhat regret breaking up with Rogers as she has started dating men who look like him. She discovers that Flatman unintentionally bought the rights to the name Avengers and comes asking to buy them from him. He agrees under the condition that the Great Lakes Avengers be made official members of the team and she begrudgingly accepts. She later bails the team out of jail, after getting arrested over a bar fight, and inducts Goodness Silva as a member, so that she does not get prosecuted by the authorities.

== Ferret ==
The Ferret is a Timely Comics character who first appeared in Marvel Mystery Comics #4 (February 1940). He was a generic detective whose only notable feature was his pet ferret, Nosie. He wears a bulletproof vest and carries a gun.

The Ferret appeared in six stories during the Golden Age of Comic Books, in Marvel Mystery Comics #4-9. In 2009, he appeared in the Marvel Mystery Comics 70th Anniversary Special and several issues of The Marvels Project, a limited series.

The Ferret aka Leslie Lenrow was a New York City based private investigator. He often consulted with the police on cases. In one case, he worked with Namor, Betty Dean, the Human Torch, Toro, Angel, Electro, and Electro's creator Philo Zog to defeat Nazi Dr. Manyac, his green flame robots, and Project: Blockbuster, a giant version of the green flame robots.

In 1940, during a seemingly routine missing persons case, the Ferret and Nosie tailed Professor Hamilton to a nondescript brownstone. In reality, Hamilton was a Nazi spy named Albrecht Kerfoot and the brownstone was a meeting place for spies. The Ferret was caught and stabbed in the heart with a dagger. His body was found by the Angel, who adopted his pet ferret and trailed the spies, eventually working with Captain America and Bucky to defeat them.

== Fever Pitch ==
Fever Pitch is a character appearing in American comic books published by Marvel Comics. He was created by Jay Faerber and Terry Dodson, and first appeared in Generation X #50 (February 1999).

Fever Pitch is a member of Gene Nation who possesses pyrokinesis, which gradually destroyed his body after manifesting and left him resembling a flaming skeleton. He is killed by the Legacy Virus in X-Force #13 (2009), but resurfaces during the Krakoan Age.

== Fiery Mask ==
Fiery Mask (real name Jack Castle) is a character appearing in American comic books published by Marvel Comics. He was a Golden Age superhero created by Joe Simon and first appeared in Daring Mystery Comics #1 from Timely Comics.

He first appeared in Daring Mystery Comics #1, then in issues #5–6 and then in Human Torch Comics #2. He returned in 2008 in The Twelve. Chris Weston has referred to him as "Marvel's Green Lantern."

== Firebolt ==
Firebolt is a fictional character appearing in American comic books published by Marvel Comics. The character first appeared in Power Man and Iron Fist #108 (August 1984).

Anthony Sloan was a mutant with pyrokinetic powers who tried to cleanse New York City of evil until he was stopped by Iron Fist and Power Man.

== Fisher King ==
The Fisher King is a character appearing in American comic books published by Marvel Comics. Created by writer Al Ewing and artist Stefano Caselli, he first appeared in X-Men Red (vol. 2) #1 (June 2022).

The Fisher King, also known as the King of Nothing, was an Arakkii with no mutant powers. Born in the Abyssal Prisons of Amenth and tortured for refusing to submit to Annihilation, he had his name, identity, and memories psychically amputated at the age of six by Azazoth and became telepathically undetectable, which allowed him to evade the forces of Tarn the Uncaring and conspire against Annihilation. The Fisher King met Zsora of the Spirit Flame after she stopped him from assassinating Tarn. They fell in love, married, and had two daughters, Khora and Zsen. The Fisher King, Zsora, and Zsora's sister Syzya of the Smoke secretly reformed the Night Table of the Great Ring of Arakko and worked to bring down Tarn and subvert Annihilation's tyrannical rule over Arakko. During an attack on Ora Serrata and the rest of the Great Ring, the Fisher King and Zsora were captured. Zsora was executed in front of their daughters and Zsen, believing her father a coward, subsequently allied with the Great Ring and joined the Inward Watch. Despite this tragedy, the Fisher King continued to resist Annihilation's regime.

After Arakko was freed from Annihilation's rule and relocated to Mars, the Fisher King traveled to the new Planet Arakko and took up residence on Elysium Mons, away from the Arakkii mainland. After Magneto constructed his Autumn Palace there, the two met and became friends.

When Genesis returns to Arakko and incites a civil war, the Fisher King sides with Storm and merges with a weakened Xilo. Throughout the war, the Fisher King serves Storm as a tactician. Xilo later leaves the Fisher King and possesses Ora Serrata, killing Fisher King in the process.

== Fiona Fitzhugh ==
Fiona Fitzhugh is a character appearing in American comic books published by Marvel Comics. The character, created by Karl Kesel and Ramon Bachs, made her first appearance in Marvel Apes #1 (September 2008).

== Flashback ==
Flashback

Publication information
- Publisher: Marvel Comics
- First appearance: Alpha Flight #1 (Aug 1983) (identified) Alpha Flight #11 (Mar 1984)
- Created by: John Byrne

In-story information
- Alter ego: Gardner Monroe
- Species: Human mutant
- Team affiliations: Beta Flight; Gamma Flight; Omega Flight
- Abilities: Ability to summon future counterparts and control them

Flashback (Gardner Monroe) is a mutant character appearing in American comic books published by Marvel Comics. His first appearance was in Alpha Flight #1.

Gardner Monroe was born in Manitoba Province, Canada. Possessing the mutant ability to summon duplicates of himself from future timelines, Monroe was recruited by Department H, a branch of Canada's Department of National Defence concerned with training superhumans as government agents. Given the code-name Flashback, Monroe progressed through the initial Gamma Flight training program and had advanced to the second-tier Beta Flight team before Department H as a whole was shut down by the Canadian government. While the primary team, Alpha Flight, continued to operate without government support, the members of Gamma and Beta Flights, including Flashback, were dismissed.

Some time later, Flashback was recruited, along with other disenfranchised members of Gamma and Beta, by Jerry Jaxon and his robot assistant Delphine Courtney into Omega Flight, a team put together to gain revenge on Department H's founder and leader of Alpha Flight, James Hudson. Though Omega Flight was defeated, the encounter ended with Guardian's apparent death. During Alpha Flight's second encounter with Omega Flight, one of Flashback's duplicates was killed by a construct created by Madison Jeffries after Courtney used it as a shield against the construct's attack, causing all other duplicates present to vanish. Upon the realization that his duplicate's death would mean his death in the future, Flashback fell to his knees in shock while Jeffries dealt with the remaining Omegans and destroyed Courtney. Flashback and his teammates were left under guard by Jeffries' construct until the police arrived to apprehend them.

Some years later Alpha Flight was informed that Flashback had disappeared from prison, and was presumed dead. Years later, Flashback resurfaced, and tried to redeem himself by destroying his costume, reasoning that if he didn't have his costume he could not be sent back to his death. Then one morning Flashback woke up to discover his costume hanging in the bathroom. This version however had the same design as the ones worn by his duplicates. Flashback soon discovered that no matter what he did, he kept on finding himself in the duplicate suit. In desperation, Flashback contacted Sasquatch and his Alpha Flight team and convinced them to help him. The Alpha Flight member Nemesis came to the conclusion that she would have to kill him with her enchanted blade to stop him from dying in the future. After much trial and error Alpha Flight managed to keep Flashback from being sent to the past.

== Flashfire ==
- First appearance: The X-Men #107 (Oct. 1977)
- Created by: Chris Claremont and Dave Cockrum
- Species: Unidentified extraterrestrial race
- Teams: Imperial Guard
- Abilities: Generate and fire bursts of light and electricity

Grannz, also known as Flashfire and Tempest, is a member of the Shi'ar Imperial Guard. The character, created by writer Chris Claremont and artist Dave Cockrum, first appeared in Uncanny X-Men #107 (October 1977). Flashfire can generate bursts of light and electricity. Like many members of the Imperial Guard, Tempest/Flashfire is the analogue of a character from DC Comics' Legion of Super-Heroes: in his case Lightning Lad (Garth Ranzz). At one point, Grannz was engaged to marry fellow Guardsman Oracle (an analogue of Saturn Girl, to whom Lightning Lad is married).

Part of the division of the Imperial Guard known as the Superguardians, Tempest is amongst the first of the Imperial Guard encountered by the team of superhuman mutant adventurers known as the X-Men who sought to rescue the Princess-Majestrix Lilandra Neramani from her insane brother, then-Majestor D'Ken. After the battle, Lilandra takes over as Majestrix, and the Guard swears allegiance to her.

Tempest is renamed Flashfire in the first issue of the Imperial Guard limited series to avoid confusion with the DC character Tempest (Joshua Clay).

== Flex ==
Flex

Publication information
- Publisher: Marvel Comics
- First appearance: Alpha Flight vol. 2 #1 (August, 1997)
- Created by: Steven T. Seagle (writer), Anthony Winn (artist)

In-story information
- Alter ego: Adrian Corbo
- Species: Human mutant
- Team affiliations: Department H Beta Flight; Alpha Flight
- Abilities: Ability to transmute limbs into razor sharp weapons

Flex (Adrian Corbo) is a superhero appearing in American comic books published by Marvel Comics. He is a former member of the superhero team Alpha Flight, but later got downgraded to Beta Flight.

Adrian and his older half-brother Jared (later codenamed Radius) were raised in the Hull House orphanage, which was actually a facility operated by the Government of Canada's secretive Department H. While Adrian became shy, reserved and bookish, Jared became athletically inclined, aggressive, and arrogant. Both brothers manifested mutant powers after puberty: Adrian gained the ability to transform parts of his body into blades, while Jared manifested a personal force field that could not be shut down. The brothers were recruited into a new incarnation of the Canadian superhero team Alpha Flight.

This incarnation was being heavily mentally controlled by Department H, led by Jeremy Clarke. As part of this, the team was led to believe that Wolverine had murdered the ex-Alpha Flight member Box. Flex was one of the team sent to stop him, which they did on a heavily forested back road in New York. Wolverine initially faces down the team, discussing things and using his senses to check them out. Flex becomes very nervous, despite his brother's bravado. Despite the efforts of both sides, a fight breaks out and it is soon joined by several more X-Men. Flex is personally confronted by Cannonball and loudly declares his desires to talk, not fight. Cannonball, always willing to do the same, does so and the two manage to get the fight to end. The fact that Wolverine had no adamantium at the time they were tracking him made the entire Alpha Flight team recognize something was wrong with the entire scenario. Radius and Flex assist the new Alpha Flight in battling several foes, including the Zodiac and the Brass Bishop.

During the Brass Bishop incident, the team encounters a church full of zombified townspeople. Flex's teammate Man-Bot reports no life signs, other than the church-goers but a scared little girl emerges from the crowd. The team follows her directions, flying off to where the girl said all the people had gone. While mid-flight, Flex is the one to realize that Man-Bot did not register the girl's vital signs. His warning saves the team from flying nose-first into a mysterious, shielded structure. The team eventually fought the malicious, mind-controlling leader of Alpha Flight, Jeremy Clarke. He later died of radiation poisoning during a Zodiac raid on the Department H headquarters, to be replaced by a new, kinder administrator. A reorganized Alpha Flight team confronts several members of the original Flight and later team up with them to defeat a new Weapon X, who had been created by a rogue Department H scientist. Both groups of Alphas merge into a unified Alpha Flight following this adventure. The Corbo brothers and several other members of the new team were later reassigned to Alpha Flight's trainee team, Beta Flight.

After the events of M-Day, Corbo lost his mutant abilities. His current whereabouts are unknown.

== Flexo the Rubber Man ==
Flexo the Rubber Man is a robot created from a form of "live" rubber that is later retconned to have been a Symbiote. He first appeared in Mystic Comics #1 (January 1940), and was created by Will Harr and Jack Binder.

== Flint ==
- Further reading: Flint at the Comic Book DB (archived from the original); Flint at the Grand Comics Database

Flint (Jaycen in Utolan, called Jason by his adoptive parents) is an Inhuman in Marvel Comics. The character, created by Charles Soule and Joe Madureira, first appeared in Inhuman #3 (October 2014).

Flint was Jason, a young African-born American boy who was adopted by Martin, a white man, and his wife. Though Jason loved his parents, he felt out of place, mostly because in the community he grew up in he was the only black person. One day, the Terrigen Mists arrived and Martin, who was actually an Inhuman, told Jason to embrace their destiny. Jason emerged from his cocoon and was immediately recruited by Lash. He is renamed Korvostax and forced by Lash and the rest of his team to fight the Royal Family, feeling that they were unworthy of being Inhumans. Lash was defeated by Medusa and Jason opted to join the Inhumans in New Attilan. During the fight, he discovered that he had geokinesis, the ability to control the earth and rocks, and could also encase himself in a rock-like body.

While in New Attilan, he learns that his biological family is still in Africa. Soon after he takes the Flint name, Jason finally visits his birthplace Utolan, and discovers his biological mother Irellis and sister Ikelli. Out of respect, Jason changes the spelling of his name to Jaycen. He also starts a relationship with fellow Inhuman Iso.

Flint is among the Inhumans who journey to the planet Centauri IV to investigate the Skyspear, a Kree device which landed there. Flint is attacked by the Zn'rx, a group of reptilian aliens who steal his powers. Flint uses the Skyspear to regain his powers and gains the ability to generate crystal. However, his body begins turning into crystal, which covers his entire right arm and part of his head before it stabilizes and stops spreading.

=== Powers and abilities of Flint ===
Flint is an Inhuman with the ability to manipulate rocks and the earth itself. This allows him to fly by levitating rock and coat himself in rock armor. After using the Skyspear, Flint gained the ability to generate crystal, which now makes up part of his body.

=== Flint in other media ===
- Flint appears in the Avengers Assemble four-part episode "Civil War", voiced by James C. Mathis III.
- Flint appears in Agents of S.H.I.E.L.D., portrayed by Coy Stewart. This version is a young inhabitant of a former S.H.I.E.L.D. base called the Lighthouse, which the Kree took over, who hails from decades in the future. In the sixth season, Izel creates a clone of Flint who later becomes a student of S.H.I.E.L.D.'s Coulson Academy in the series finale "What We're Fighting For".
- Flint appears in Marvel Future Avengers, voiced by Motoki Sakuma in the Japanese version and John Eric Bentley in the English dub.

== Sally Floyd ==
Sally Floyd is a character created by Paul Jenkins and Ramon Bachs, first appearing in Generation M #1 (November, 2005). Sally is a journalist, often reporting on the superhuman community.

Sally initially worked for a journal known as the Alternative and was married to Ken. They had a mutant child, Minnie, whose mutation caused her to deage until she eventually died. Ken left and Sally became an alcoholic.

After the Decimation, she interviewed former mutants for the Ex-Mutant Diaries, including former X-Men. She was hunted by a mutant killer known as the Ghoul, but he was stopped by the X-Men.

During the Civil War event, Sally investigated the anti-registration side. Afterwards, she started up a new journal, Front Line, with Ben Urich and began dating Danny Granville. She remained in Manhattan to cover World War Hulk. She was later imprisoned during Secret Empire.

Sally later uncovered Charles Xavier's plot to save the X-Men by faking an attack on a space frigate. He would have erased her mind of the events, but she chose to have her identity erased and move away.

== Flux ==
Private Benjamin "Benny" Tibbets is a Private First Class in the United States Army who was exposed to a gamma bomb by John Ryker, who wished to test its effects on humans. He was transformed into a Hulk-like creature with superhuman strength and a childlike mentality and vocabulary. Convinced by Ryker that Bruce Banner was responsible for his condition and had sold gamma technology to Iraq, Flux is sent after the Hulk, but the fight proves one-sided and Banner is able to talk him down. Tibbets undergoes psychiatric evaluation thanks to Doc Samson, but he is subsequently recaptured by Ryker. Apparently perceiving Ryker as his parent, Flux is once again pitted against the Hulk, but the fight ends when Thunderbolt Ross forces Ryker to stand down. Without Ryker's commands, Flux stops fighting and broke down, reverting to his human form.

During the World War Hulk storyline, Flux is captured and experimented on by A.I.M. He is later killed by Grey of the Gamma Corps during a raid on the A.I.M. base.

=== Flux in other media ===
Flux appears in Hulk, voiced by Lee Tockar.

== Flying Tiger ==
Flying Tiger is a supervillain appearing in American comic books published by Marvel Comics. Created by writer Chris Claremont and artists Steve Leialoha and Bob Wiacek, the character first appeared in Spider-Woman #40 (October 1981). Flying Tiger is an enemy of Spider-Woman who wields powered armor that allows him to fly and gives him the appearance of a humanoid tiger. Originally a professional football player whose career was cut short, he created his armor himself and became a mercenary and assassin. Flying Tiger has also been a member of the Masters of Evil.

== Fooh ==
Fooh is a character appearing in American comic books published by Marvel Comics. The character, created by Kaare Andrews, first appeared in Iron Fist: The Living Weapon #3 (June 2014).

Fooh was a former Dragon-King and engineer from K'un-Lun who secretly constructed technology for the corrupt Yu-Ti, which is forbidden in K'un-Lun. He was exiled by the Yu-Ti to cover up his involvement with the creation of the android known as the One. Years later, the One attacked K'un-Lun and nearly killed Iron Fist, Fooh and Sparrow rescued Iron Fist and nursed him back to health. Fooh uses his gadgets to help Iron Fist defeat the One.

Fooh would continue assisting Iron Fist as a valuable ally, particularly with his portal technology. He would also go on to assist Danny's successor, Lin Lie.

== Forearm ==
=== Marcus Tucker ===
Forearm (Marcus Tucker) is a character appearing in X-Men comic books published by Marvel Comics. The character was created by Grant Morrison and Ethan van Sciver, first appearing in New X-Men #117 (September 2011). He had joined Cyclops' Street team X-Men to battle against Xorn during his rampage through New York.

== Lee Forrester ==
Lee Forrester

Publication information
- First appearance: Uncanny X-Men #143 (December 1980)
- Created by: Chris Claremont; John Byrne

In-story information
- Alter ego: Aleytys Forrester
- Species: Human
- Place of origin: Florida, United States
- Supporting character of: Cyclops; Magneto; Cable

Aleytys "Lee" Forrester is a fictional character appearing in American comic books published by Marvel Comics. Her first appearance was in The Uncanny X-Men #143.

Forrester first appeared in Uncanny X-Men #143 (December 1980), written by Chris Claremont and illustrated by John Byrne. She was introduced as a minor character when Scott Summers/Cyclops left the X-Men following Jean Grey's death and began working on Forrester's trawler, the Arcadia.

Forrester later appeared in X-Men #16–19 (August–October 2011). The story uses Forrester as a plot device: her ship is pulled into a mysterious dimensional anomaly in the Bermuda Triangle. She sends a distress call via a message buoy, which the Future Foundation recovers and brings to Cyclops and the X-Men. The two teams travel to the dimension to rescue her. There, they discover a hidden prehistoric realm inhabited by descendants of the High Evolutionary's creations, where Forrester has survived and allied with Skull the Slayer. Forrester remains in this realm as its guardian alongside Skull rather than return to Earth.

== Foxfire ==
Foxfire (Olivia Underwood) was born in Nexusville, New Brunswick, in the United States of Earth-712. She later became a criminal and supervillain using the alias Foxfire. She was a member of the Institute of Evil, a criminal organization opposed by the superhero team called the Squadron Supreme. This was complicated somewhat by the fact that Foxfire was in love with Squadron member Doctor Spectrum, although he did not seem to return her feelings.

She was among the Institute of Evil members who battled the Squadron Supreme in their final attempt to destroy the heroes. When the Institute of Evil was captured by the Squadron and its members mind controlled by the Behavior Modification device, Foxfire and the other former super-criminals became members of the Squadron, to assist them in their efforts to forcibly turn the world into a Utopia. Her criminal record was pardoned, and she became a public crusader and government superhero. She accompanied Hyperion to supervise the behavior modification process at a prison. She finally later began a relationship with Doctor Spectrum.

The hero named Nighthawk opposed the Squadron and formed a rebel group, the Redeemers. He undid the Behavior Modification of Foxfire and several others, and recruited them into his group.

During the final battle between the Redeemers and the Squadron at Squadron City, Foxfire, who was still in love with Doctor Spectrum, tried to gain his approval by betraying Nighthawk, thus allowing the Squadron to win the fight. She used her powers to kill Nighthawk by blasting his heart. Foxfire was then killed by fellow Redeemer Mink, who had been in love with Nighthawk, when she was stabbed through the heart by Mink's artificial claws. The death of Nighthawk caused the Squadron members to realize that they had become the very thing that they had intended to oppose, and thus ended the fight, though not in the way that Foxfire had intended.

== Maximilian Frankenstein ==
Maximilian Frankenstein is a character appearing in American comic books published by Marvel Comics. He first appeared in X-Men: Schism #2 (July 2011) and was created by Jason Aaron and Frank Cho.

Born Maximilian von Katzenelnbogen, Maximilian Frankenstein is a child prodigy who is the last known descendant of Victor Frankenstein. He joined Kade Kilgore's new version of the Hellfire Club as the Black Bishop. He was responsible for the creation of the new Krakoa which served as the grounds of the Jean Grey School for Higher Learning. He faced the X-Men a number of times but was defeated at the Hellfire Academy and made to join the Jean Grey school, alongside fellow villain Manuel Enduque.

== Victoria Frankenstein ==
Victoria Frankenstein is the great-granddaughter of Victor Frankenstein who took in the dwarf-like failed creations of Basil Frankenstein and Ludwig Frankenstein as her children. In addition, she took a potion that slowed her aging. She would later take in her great-grandfather's creation Frankenstein's Monster

At one point, she came across Elendil who originally belonged to Black Knight and accidentally mutated it further when trying to restore it to a normal horse. After she helped Bram Velsing recuperate after Doctor Doom fused a metal mask to his head, Victoria Frankenstein, her Children, and Frankenstein's Monster helped Iron Man fight Velsing when he planned revenge on Doom. Iron Man was able to defeat Dreadknight and Victoria and her children took the unconscious Bram into their custody.

== Freak ==
=== Spider-Man villain ===
Freak

Publication information
- Publisher: Marvel Comics
- First appearance: The Amazing Spider-Man #552 (March 2008)
- Created by: Bob Gale; Phil Jimenez

In-story information
- Alter ego: Unknown
- Species: Human
- Notable aliases: Armadillo Man
- Abilities: Superhuman strength and durability Acidic saliva Ability to adapt to conditions through metamorphosis and shoot toxic spores from his body at will

A drug addict nicknamed the Freak is chased down by Spider-Man after attempting to steal from the soup kitchen where Spider-Man's Aunt May works. Freak stumbles into a laboratory owned by Curt Connors and injects himself with animal gene fluids, thinking that they are methamphetamine. As a result, he gains the ability to metamorphose into new forms, taking on the form of a skinless man and an armadillo-like monster. Spider-Man immobilizes Freak with quicklime, after which he is taken away by Oscorp.

Freak is next seen cut open and hooked up to machines in an Oscorp lab where scientists are using his abilities to cure diseases. Norman Osborn injects him with a sample of the anti-venom antibodies to create "super-venom", a virus capable of killing millions with a single drop. He then uses the super-venom to re-power Mac Gargan, who was "cured" of the Venom symbiote by Anti-Venom. In the confrontation between Spider-Man and Osborn, Osborn activates the building's self-destruction with Freak still inside, with him being presumed dead. He is later revealed to have survived.

== Freakshow ==
Freakshow is the name of two characters appearing in American comic books published by Marvel Comics.

=== Kevin ===
In X-Force #101, a young mutant known as Kevin, nicknamed Freakshow, nearly falls to his death when attempting to impress others his age by proving that he could fly. This occurs when the High Evolutionary temporarily eliminates all mutant abilities.

=== Genoshan ===
Freakshow

Publication information
- Publisher: Marvel Comics
- First appearance: Excalibur vol. 3 #1 (2004)
- Created by: Chris Claremont

In-story information
- Species: Human mutant
- Team affiliations: Genoshan Excalibur
- Abilities: Ability to transform into a variety of monstrous forms with unique abilities

Freakshow is one of the few survivors of the island of Genosha after the Sentinel attacks on the capital of Hammer Bay. Freakshow travels with Wicked and becomes an unofficial pupil of Professor X. During a skirmish with Unus the Untouchable, Xavier had Freakshow swallow the man whole. Because of Unus' natural force field he was unharmed, albeit shaken when Freakshow vomited him up later. He protects Wicked from Genoshan Magistrates, as well as taking on a worm-like form to remove the debris of the destroyed Genosha to turn it into arable land.

After the events of the House of M, Freakshow is revealed to be one of the many mutants to lose his abilities as a result of the Scarlet Witch's decimation. He is with a number of Genoshan mutants, including Unus and Wicked, when the travelling Quicksilver convinces them to try the mutagenic Terrigen Mists, which had been stolen from the Inhumans. Freakshow regains his powers, but he is unable to change out of his large, monstrous form. While trapped like this, he and the other Genosha mutants are drawn into battle with the Inhumans, who are tracking down Quicksilver. Some time after, the effects of the mist wear off and the mutants are given medical care.

== Freebooter ==
Freebooter (Brandon Cross) is a character who appeared in the Marvel Comics' series A-Next. He was created by Tom DeFalco and Brent Anderson, and first appeared in A-Next #4 (1999).

Brandon Cross was a protégé of Hawkeye and Swordsman. He was invited to join the "Dream Team" of new Avengers who were going to become members of A-Next. Donning a Hawkeye-like costume, he assumed the guise of the roguish "Freebooter".

Freebooter quickly displayed a tendency to promiscuity and charisma, and poured on the charm for teammate Stinger and found her totally unreceptive to him. Stinger was outraged that new Avengers were being added to the team without her knowledge or permission, and felt no desire to fraternize with the new recruits (especially Freebooter), but in due time Freebooter's fighting skills earned her respect, and his heroic, chivalrous nature her affections. He became a valuable member of the team, but tragedy struck when his close friend and fellow "Dream Teamer" Crimson Curse was killed in the line of duty. Freebooter lost his carefree attitude and became more withdrawn, but he still fought the forces of evil in her honor.

During the events of Last Planet Standing, Freebooter was badly injured, but received help from the former villain Sabreclaw, whom he later convinced to join A-Next while he was recuperating. Freebooter later returns to active Avengers duty.

Freebooter has no powers, but has outstanding swordsmanship skills and is an expert archer. His weapon of choice is a retractable bo staff.

== Freya ==
Freya is an Asgardian and goddess of fertility based on the Norse deity of the same name. She appears as a supporting character of Thor. Freya first appeared in Thor #321 (Oct. 1993) and was created by Bill Mantlo and Don Heck. Freya used to work as a former Valkyrie. The people of Asgard have started a cult that worships her on the Isle of Love. On one occasion, Rimthursar lied to Freya stating that Odin has died to trick her into crying so that Rimthursar can collect her tears. Freya had an artifact named after her called the Cloak of Freya, which Loki once used to turn Storm into a falcon.

The Giant Thrym once tried to barter Thor's stolen hammer Mjolnir for Freya's hand in marriage, but Thor and Loki were able to outwit Thyrm. Freya's history was later retconned with her position was given to the similarly names fellow goddess Freyja. Freya has the various superhuman attributes that the other Asgardians have. She can also speak in the languages of the Nine Realms.

== Sharon Friedlander ==
Sharon Friedlander

Publication information
- Publisher: Marvel Comics
- First appearance: The New Mutants #19 (Sept. 1984)
- Created by: Chris Claremont; Bill Sienkiewicz

In-story information
- Team affiliations: Muir Island X-Men; Xavier Institute
- Abilities: Superhuman strength

Sharon Friedlander is a character appearing in American comic books published by Marvel Comics. Sharon first appeared in New Mutants #19 (1984), and was created by Chris Claremont and Bill Sienkiewicz. Her last appearance was in Uncanny X-Men #298 (March 1993), where she was killed by Joanna Cargill.

Sharon Friedlander is a nurse who was abducted by a creature called the Demon Bear alongside police officer Tom Corsi. The Demon Bear attempts to transform Sharon and Tom into his demonic slaves. After the New Mutants defeat the bear, Tom and Sharon are returned to their natural human form, with a couple of physical changes: the two of them acquired features similar to Native Americans (previously they were both White Americans), along with being enhanced to the level of being perfect human specimens.

After her initial encounter with the New Mutants, Sharon joins the staff at Xavier's School for Gifted Youngsters, as a nurse and confidante. Sharon and Tom Corsi had a brief romantic interest in each other, which was later used against them by Empath, one of the Hellions. Empath used his power over human emotions to make their romantic feelings into obsessive ones.

Sharon stays at Xavier's School for some time, until the New Mutants travel in Asgard; Sharon and Tom appear less frequently in the X-titles by then. Eventually, Sharon moves to Muir Island with Moira MacTaggert.

Some time later, Sharon becomes a teacher at a school for the handicapped, called Our Mother of the Sacred Heart. The school is attacked by a new group of Acolytes, during which Sharon is killed by Joanna Cargill.

== Frog-Man ==
Frog-Man is the name of two characters appearing in American comic books published by Marvel Comics.

=== François LeBlanc ===
François LeBlanc first appeared in Daredevil #10–11 (October and December 1965), and was created by Stan Lee and Wally Wood.

LeBlanc, a man with Olympic-level leaping skills and a former military frogman, is among those recruited by the Organizer, secretly a candidate for the New York mayorship, to form the Ani-Men. Because of his abilities and background, LeBlanc was given a frog-resembling costume. The team goes on missions to undermine the current administration. Daredevil defeats them and they all go to prison. The Ani-Men later work for Count Nefaria, whose scientists submit the unwitting Ani-Men to processes that temporarily give them superhuman powers and animal-like forms. LeBlanc gains superhuman strength and stamina, along with frog-like legs. They invade the Cheyenne Mountain missile base and fight the X-Men. After they lose their powers the team is sent to kill Tony Stark, themselves dying by a bomb that Spymaster had planted to kill Stark.

=== Unnamed Frog-Man ===
During the Secret Wars storyline, a second Ani-Men version of Frog-Man, alongside Ape-Man and Cat-Man, went on a crime spree when the heroes were on Battleworld. They obtained the equipment of the original Ani-Men and used it to rob a vault wagon, only to be opposed by the NYPD.

== Carmilla Frost ==
- Further reading: Carmilla Frost at the Comic Book DB (archived from the original); Carmilla Frost at the Grand Comics Database

Carmilla Frost is a freedom fighter and member of Killraven's Freemen in a post-apocalyptic alternate future of the Marvel Universe.

The character, created by Don McGregor and Herb Trimpe, first appeared in Amazing Adventures (vol. 2) #21 (November 1973) and continued to appear in most issues of the title through #39.

Carmilla is from an alternate-reality Earth run by Martians. In 2001, she and her father Andre are taken to the Martians' Yankee Stadium Genetic and Clonal Complex. Andre is blackmailed with threats to his daughter into helping the Martians in performing cloning research. In 2004 she begins assisting her father in his experiments, and eventually becomes an expert molecular biologist. By 2010 she becomes the youngest human designated as a Keeper by the Martians. In 2014 she refuses to conduct cloning experiments on other humans, but two years later, after a Martian Overlord kills Andre, she agrees to clone his corpse in an attempt to restore him to life. Her efforts fail, instead producing the mutated creature Grok. In 2018 she helps Killraven escape from captivity from the Yankee Stadium Genetic and Clonal Complex and joins his Freemen. In 2020 she learns that she is pregnant with Killraven's child.

She and her newborn son Skar are rescued by the cross-reality traveling Machine Man and Howard the Duck.

== Christian Frost ==
Christian Frost is the younger brother of Adrienne, Cordelia and Emma Frost. He was created by Grant Morrison and Phil Jimenez and made his first appearance in New X-Men #139 (June 2003).

Not wanting anything to do with the family business, Christian often clashed with his father Winston. When Winston learned that his son was gay, he threatened to disown him and forced Christian to dump his then-boyfriend and move into the family home with him. Christian refused and cut ties with his family, only remaining in contact with Emma, his closest confidante. In retaliation, Winston used his power to have Christian's boyfriend deported, leading Christian to develop a substance abuse problem as a way to cope with the resulting depression. As his addiction worsened, a concerned Emma asked their father to help him get clean and Winston gladly welcomed his son back before turning on him and locking him in a mental institution to "cure" him of being gay once Emma had left. Following the conversion therapy, Christian was released and reinstated as the heir to the Frost business. Christian subsequently murdered Winston as revenge for the years of abuse his father had subjected him to and took over his business empire.

After becoming suspicious that her father had appointed Christian as heir to the business, Emma visited his mansion and was greeted by her father. Demanding to see Christian, Winston refused and exhibited never-before-seen psychic powers to force her to retreat. Worried for her brother's safety, Emma approached Iceman and he agreed to help rescue Christian from her father. When they returned to the mansion, they fought through several psychic apparitions before discovering Winston's body in his study. While Iceman bought her time, Emma reached out and discovered that Christian was the one causing the apparitions, including that of their father. Emma's attempts to reach Christian's mind were in vain as, in the midst of a mental breakdown causing him to lose control of his powers, Christian was unable to hear her. As the Frost siblings were unable to directly infiltrate each other's minds, Emma created a telepathic link between Iceman and Christian, allowing them to communicate. Iceman, having recently been outed, empathised with Christian's homophobic experiences and managed to calm him down enough for him to regain control. Emma thanked Iceman and decided to stay with her brother to help him come to terms with what had happened and get him back on his feet.

After the mutant nation of Krakoa is formed, Emma re-establishes the Hellfire Club as the Hellfire Trading Company which aims to help distribute supplies in service of mutants, with Emma once again as its White Queen. Emma brings Christian into the fold, appointing him as her White Bishop. Christian begins to become closer with Iceman through his work for the Company and the two begin a casual relationship.

=== Powers and abilities ===
Unlike his siblings, Christian's psychic powers did not emerge when he was younger and appear to have developed much more recently. He has the ability to draw upon and materialize energy from the astral plane and create Avatars of energy constructs or project it as a destructive psionic energy blast which causes both physical and mental damage. His newly manifested abilities are extremely powerful, as his projection of Winston was robust enough to convince Emma, herself a particularly advanced telepath, that it was her actual father.

== Frost Pharaoh ==
Frost Pharaoh is a supervillain appearing in American comic books published by Marvel Comics. He was created by Saladin Ahmed and Javier Garrón, and first appeared in Miles Morales: Spider-Man #4 (March 2019).

Frost Pharaoh is a young criminal with an obsession with Ancient Egypt and dresses like a pharaoh. The Frost Pharaoh's numerous attempts to obtain the mysterious "Stone of the Gods" through force at the Brooklyn Museum leads to repeated defeats at the hands of Spider-Man (Miles Morales).

During the events of "Gang War", Frost Pharaoh is shown to have gained control of Brooklyn Heights, Dumbo, and Vinegar Hill within New York City's criminal underworld. Frost Phraraoh and his gang, the Ankh-Colytes, engage in a destructive turf war with Bumbler, but are defeated by Spider-Man and the Daughters of the Dragon.

Frost Pharaoh possesses a mystical was-sceptre that can fire blasts of ice. In addition, he is also able to the was-scepter's power to create ice mummies.

== Frostbite ==
Frostbite (Sloan Alden) ran a cryogenics institute where the wealthy and dying would be frozen. As a result of the Zodiac draining of New York's energy, Alden's own cryo-chamber drained power from the others, as well as a back-up generator, to keep him alive. The side-effect granted him the ability to generate and control ice as well as creating things like ice walls and ice storms.

=== Frostbite in other media ===
Frostbite makes a non-speaking cameo appearance in the Spider-Man episode "The Cellar" as an inmate of the eponymous prison.

== Fusion ==
Fusion is the name of two characters appearing in American comic books published by Marvel Comics.

=== Hubert and Pinky Fusser ===
Hubert and Pinky Fusser are twins. Both born with dwarfism, one becomes a nuclear scientist, and the other becomes a janitor at the same privately owned research corporation where his brother works. They are able to fuse into one being which can absorb energy to increase its strength and size.

=== Wayne Markley ===
When he was a child, Markley discovered he had the mutant ability to persuade people into doing whatever he wanted, simultaneously manipulating their senses. Using his power, he made millions, using his money to develop systems to enhance his abilities even further, to the point where he became- in his own words- a "more-than-perfect killing machine". He later became a supervillain using telepathic illusions to deceive heroes that he had various dangerous superpowers. He mainly appeared as a villain of Spider-Man in Peter Parker: Spider-Man #30-41 (2001-2002).

== Futurist ==
Futurist

Publication information
- Publisher: Marvel Comics
- First appearance: Fantastic Four #216 (March 1980)
- Created by: Marv Wolfman; John Byrne

In-story information
- Alter ego: Randolph James
- Species: Human mutate
- Partnerships: Alpha the Ultimate Mutant
- Abilities: Flight, superhuman mental abilities

Futurist (Randolph James) is a character appearing in American comic books published by Marvel Comics.

Dr. Randolph James was a scientist who evolved himself into a large-skulled, highly intelligent humanoid with great psionic abilities. James was a classmate and friend of Reed Richards, who later became Mister Fantastic. He later became a professor and research scientist though he became somewhat unstable when his wife died.

Years later Reed and his team, the Fantastic Four came to visit James. Right after the Fantastic Four departed, a group of young thugs broke into James' home and robbed and assaulted him. James tried to call the Fantastic Four, but they were busy fighting Blastaar. Fearing his own death, James in his desperation used his evolution-accelerator to heal the severe trauma he received. When Mister Fantastic returned, he found his friend transformed into the Futurist. The Futurist discovered the gang that had attacked him still lurking in his neighborhood, and turned them into rats. The Futurist floated towards the Fantastic Four's headquarters, the Baxter Building, displaying his raw power along the way. Once there, Blastaar tricked the Futurist into making an alliance with him, convincing the Futurist that the Fantastic Four were dangerous and needed to be destroyed. Blaastar and the Futurist broke into the Baxter Building, placing the Invisible Woman into a deep slumber. The Futurist sensed Blastaar's evil intent, and allowed Franklin Richards to send Blastaar back to the Negative Zone with his psychic powers. The Futurist left the Earth, seeking out new vistas of exploration in outer space.
