= Puck (Marvel Comics) =

- Puck as depicted in Alpha Flight #5 (December 1983). Art by John Byrne

Publication information
- Publisher: Marvel Comics
- First appearance: Alpha Flight #1 (August 1983)
- Created by: John Byrne

In-story information
- Alter ego: Eugene Milton Judd
- Species: Altered human
- Team affiliations: Alpha Flight; Beta Flight; Gamma Flight; X-Force
- Notable aliases: Geno
- Abilities: Superhuman strength, agility, reflexes, durability Superhuman longevity Skilled fighter

Puck is a fictional character appearing in American comic books published by Marvel Comics. He is a member of Alpha Flight, in the Marvel Universe. A daughter of his has also adopted the name Puck and Alpha Flight membership.

== Publication history ==
Puck debuted in Alpha Flight #1 (Aug 1983) and was created by John Byrne. He had intended for the original Puck to be a dwarf with no superhuman powers, merely great fighting and acrobatic skills; subsequent writer Bill Mantlo retconned Puck's small stature as being due to mystical influences. Byrne commented on this, "Of course, [Bill Mantlo] then went on to do the 'origin' of Puck, with the whole 'demon inside' thing being based, apparently, on the single reference Puck had made to being in constant pain, something which Bill failed to grasp was an effect of the condition — achondroplasty, called by name in the same issue that referenced the pain — which caused Puck's dwarfism." Byrne has also stated that Puck was based "very, very loosely on a friend who was short (but not as short as Puck) and occasionally bald, but never possessed by demons."

A letters page in Alpha Flight seemed to confirm that Judd is named after the Shakespearean character. In a FAQ on May 30, 2006, John Byrne stated that the character was named after a hockey puck.

The second Puck debuted in Alpha Flight vol. 3 #1 and was created by Scott Lobdell and Clayton Henry.

== Fictional character biography ==
=== Puck (Eugene Judd) ===
Eugene Milton Judd was born in 1914 in Saskatoon, Saskatchewan. He spent years traveling the world as a soldier of fortune, working as an intelligence agent and bouncer, before becoming a professional adventurer and joining Alpha Flight.

Early in his career, Judd was hired to steal the Black Blade of Baghdad. The Blade imprisoned an ancient sorcerer called Black Raazer, and Judd accidentally freed him. Judd trapped Raazer using ancient mysticism and the light from his own life force, but was transformed into an immortal, dwarfish form as a result. He became friends with the American playboy Dan Kane, otherwise known as Captain Terror. When Captain Terror was defeated in the Spanish Civil War by the 1930s El Águila, a fellow hero fighting on the opposite side, he retired, but Puck fought Aguila for revenge. He also formed a friendship with noted author Ernest Hemingway and became an accomplished bullfighter. He was paroled into Beta Flight and, eventually joining Alpha Flight, he adopted the codename "Puck".

Puck is seriously wounded by teammate Marrina, made temporarily bestial under a summoning call sent by the Master of the World and hospitalized. While recovering, he battles an illegal drug ring operating out of the hospital. A solo adventure of Puck set shortly after his recovery was produced to be a fill-in issue of Alpha Flight, but never published; however, the adventure remains part of the Marvel canon due to Puck making a fleeting reference to "the affair of the Brass Bishop". Puck returns to active duty, and battles Omega Flight. Puck comforts Heather Hudson after James Hudson's presumed death. Puck then encounters Namor, and allies with the Sub-Mariner in battle against the Master.

Puck journeys to the realm of the Great Beasts alongside Alpha Flight, where they battle the Great Beasts. Puck encounters the Beyonder, and battles the Hulk during the events of Secret Wars II.

During his time with Alpha Flight, he encounters a new city deep in the Arctic Circle. There, his team and the X-Men discover a mystical wellspring. Several humans associated with the X-Men had gained vast powers via the wellspring. Puck is cured of his dwarfism by Madelyne Pryor. The group discovers that the powers cause the loss of all creativity among all affected and the deaths of all mystics. This includes Puck's friend Shaman. The group splits along ideological lines, and both groups battle for some time before turning on the trickster god Loki. Loki removes all effects of the well, including Puck's new height. Puck rejects Loki's offer to restore the well's gifts.

Puck battles Black Raazer, who temporarily freed himself from the prison of Puck's body. He tells his teammates about his past, and then takes Raazer back into his body once more. He had romantic interest in Heather Hudson, but she instead turns to their teammate Madison Jeffries. Puck later encounters the Avengers.

When Northstar and Aurora both fall deathly ill (him physically and her mentally), Alpha Flight takes them to the site of the Firefountain that Loki used to grant powers and wishes. Loki leads them to a dark fountain instead (emanating from a deep pit), and sends dark elves to attack them. During the resulting fight, Puck is knocked into the fountain. Raazer is freed from Puck's body, returning Puck to his normal size and actual age even as he falls to what should have been his death. Loki instead teleports Puck to Tibet, and abandons his previous life. Puck becomes embroiled in a battle between Tibet and mainland China. He fights the Dreamqueen alongside Alpha Flight and is captured by her as the rest of the team is sent elsewhere. After being tortured by the Dreamqueen, he is rescued by Alpha Flight and taken to the hospital to heal the injuries Dreamqueen inflicted. Shaman injects Puck with a serum derived from his own blood and the mutative properties of a formula created by the Master. The serum was designed to repair Puck's body, but it was from his dwarf state. It reshapes him into his dwarf form and gives him the power to harden his skin to near invulnerability. He rejoins Alpha Flight with his new power.

During the events of the Infinity Crusade, Puck is brainwashed and taken by the Goddess. He is paired up with the affected Spider-Man when an invasion force of free-minded superheroes plan to attack the Goddess' fortress. This specific pairing was intended to teach Spider-Man brutality in the face of his 'former' friends. Puck is swiftly taken out of the fight, defeated by Firestar. Due to the effects of the resulting clash, all brainwashed heroes are later freed.

Puck is brainwashed again by members of his own government, who desire to have an Alpha Flight completely under their control. Puck fights with this new team for a while and is one of the few to be relatively successful against the mental mind games.

Along with Major Mapleleaf, Puck (Zuzha Yu), Vindicator, and Shaman, Puck is among the Alpha Flight members apparently killed by the Collective. Only Sasquatch is confirmed to have survived.

When Wolverine is trapped in Hell by unknown forces, Puck and an unknown person are seen there, with the unknown person claiming to just want to talk to Wolverine, but Puck planning on finding a way to get both Wolverine and himself out of hell. Puck tells Wolverine to fight through the pain he feels while being tortured, implying that it will make the devil look weak and cause an uprising in hell, thus giving them a chance to escape. After the Devil is beaten, Puck attempts to escape along with Wolverine, but another condemned one grabs his foot and yanks him off the walls of hell which he was scaling and back into the pit. Though he remains in Hell, he wins the scrum for the Devil's sword, thus making him the ruler of Hell, at least for the time being.

During the Fear Itself storyline, Puck escapes from Hell after his fight with Ba'al and rescues Guardian from Vindicator (who betrayed the team to Gary Cody and his newly elected Unity Party, later revealed to be under the control of the Master of the World).

In the 2012 series Uncanny X-Force, Puck joins the eponymous team alongside Storm, Psylocke, and Spiral.

When Elizabeth Twoyoungmen is introduced to Alpha Flight, Puck becomes her physics instructor. Much later, at the time of a mass Wendigo outbreak, the two have become lovers.

As part of the All-New, All-Different Marvel event, Puck appears as a member of the Alpha Flight space program.

=== Puck (Zuzha Yu) ===
Puck

Publication information
- Publisher: Marvel Comics
- First appearance: Alpha Flight #1 (May 2004)
- Created by: Scott Lobdell; Clayton Henry

In-story information
- Alter ego: Zuzha Yu
- Species: Human Mutant
- Team affiliations: Alpha Flight
- Abilities: Superhuman strength, speed, reflexes, agility, coordination, endurance Ability to redirect kinetic energy Skilled fighter

Zuzha Yu was a mutant who worked at a bar near McGill University in Montreal and was supposedly the daughter of the original Puck. She agreed to join the reformed Alpha Flight after losing an arm-wrestling match with Walter Langkowski, alias Sasquatch.

At the end of the series it shows that she and Major Mapleleaf have children.

She was one of the members of Alpha Flight apparently killed by the Collective.

== Powers and abilities ==
Originally, Puck had no superhuman powers, relying on his exceptional training and his amassed worldly knowledge. He was a formidable hand-to-hand combatant, capable of a mixture of various martial arts, street-fighting techniques, acrobatics and gymnastics. After a run-in with The Master of the World his body was subject to genetic manipulation of his cellular structure. His body tissues were condensed at a molecular level, causing his body to become akin to compressed rubber. His trademark attack is a cartwheeling motion. Spinning on his hands and feet at great speeds, he is able to slam into and knock down enemies with ease. He is also skilled in bullfighting. He has some knowledge of mysticism, enough to once trap Black Raazer, and the ability to put himself in a temporary deathlike trance state. Puck possesses a slowed aging process that makes him appear to be in his thirties.

Zuzha Yu had superhuman strength, speed, reflexes, agility, coordination, endurance, and could redirect kinetic energy. She was an excellent hand-to-hand combatant.

== Other versions ==
=== Earth X ===
In this alternate future, Puck is seen as one of the many heroes in the afterlife. They all rally to fight the forces of Mephisto and Thanos, in an attempt to stop their genocidal plans.

=== Marvel Zombies ===
A zombified alternate universe version of Puck appears in Marvel Zombies: Dead Days.

=== Marvel Noir ===
An alternate universe version of Eugene Judd appears in X-Men Noir. This version is Logan's first mate.

== In other media ==
=== Television ===
The Eugene Judd incarnation of Puck appears in the X-Men: The Animated Series episode "Repo Man", voiced by Don Francks.

He subsequently appears in X-Men '97, both as himself and as a form taken by Morph.

=== Video games ===
- Puck appears in Marvel Super Heroes in War of the Gems.
- Puck appears as a playable character in Marvel Puzzle Quest.

=== Merchandise ===
- In 1999, Toy Biz released an action figure of Puck as part of a two-pack with Snowbird.
- In 2013, Hasbro released an action figure of Puck in wave 21 of its Marvel Universe line.
- In 2013, Puck received a BAF (Build a Figure) in a Diamond exclusive Wolverine Legends wave.
- In 2019, Puck received an action figure in an Amazon exclusive Marvel Legends Alpha Flight set. This figure is the complete version of the Build A Figure from 2013.
