= Heather Hudson =

Marvel Comics superhero

Vindicator
- Vindicator. Art by Clayton Henry

Publication information
- Publisher: Marvel Comics
- First appearance: As Heather Hudson: The Uncanny X-Men #139 (November 1980); As Vindicator: Alpha Flight #32 (December 1985); As Guardian: Alpha Flight #90 (September 1990); As Nemesis: Alpha Flight vol. 5 #1 (August 2023)
- Created by: Chris Claremont; John Byrne

In-story information
- Alter ego: Heather MacNeil Hudson
- Species: Human
- Place of origin: Calgary, Alberta, Canada (Earth-616)
- Team affiliations: Department H Alpha Flight; Alpha Prime; Alpha Strike
- Partnerships: Guardian
- Notable aliases: Guardian; Nemesis
- Abilities: Skilled martial artist, strategist; Suit grants: Flight; Force field generation; Ability to manipulate geothermal energies; Use of the mystical sword Scell granting: Teleportation; Superhuman durability

Heather MacNeil Hudson (known as Vindicator, formerly as Guardian and currently Nemesis) is a superhero appearing in American comic books published by Marvel Comics. Debuting in The Uncanny X-Men #139 (November 1980), the character was created by Chris Claremont and John Byrne as a supporting character to the Canadian superhero team, Alpha Flight.

Following the apparent death of her husband James, Heather inherits his leadership of Alpha Flight and battle-suit, taking on the codename Vindicator, a previous codename James used. Following James' return, she takes her husband's mantle of Guardian while he uses Vindicator for a time before the two switch back to their original codenames. After a long hiatus from Alpha Flight, Heather rejoins the team as the fourth Nemesis. An alternate version as Heather McDaniel / Sasquatch joined the reality hopping heroes, the Exiles.

== Publication history ==
Heather Hudson first appeared in The Uncanny X-Men #139 (November 1980) and was created by Chris Claremont and John Byrne. She remained a major character of Alpha Flight volumes 1-5, while also making cameos in other books.

Heather began as a supporting character in Alpha Flight (Vol. 1), with her maiden name, McNeil, debuting in issue #2 and eventually becoming the team leader in issue #17. Heather debuts as Vindicator in Alpha Flight #32 (December 1985), Guardian in Alpha Flight #90 (September 1990), and Nemesis in Alpha Flight vol. 5 #1 (August 2023). An alternate version known as Heather McDaniel / Sasquatch debuted in Exiles #10 (February, 2002).

== Fictional character biography ==
Heather McNeil was born in Calgary, Alberta, Canada. She was originally a secretary at Amcam corporation, where she fell in love with James MacDonald Hudson. After he had stolen his power suit to prevent it from being used as a military weapon, Heather discovered his secret and decided to share it with him. Soon after they were married. (Note: As revealed in Alpha Flight #3.)

Heather supported her husband in the forming of Department H and his becoming a superhero. She also assisted Wolverine in recovering from the trauma of having been infused with adamantium-laced bones and claws, and was later reunited with him.

After Department H is dissolved, Heather brings members of the disbanded Alpha Flight together to battle Tundra of the Great Beasts. With this initiative creating a spectacular success, the team decides to continue operating Alpha Flight as an independent group. Heather witnesses the apparent death of James Hudson, but because no one else saw him die and there was no corpse, James remains legally alive and no funeral could be held for him, making it more difficult for Heather to get through her grief. She is injured attempting to rescue a child from an alien Plodex.

Heather is asked by the members of Alpha Flight to take over leadership of the team from James. She accepts, though initially she leads purely as a non-combatant. She leads Alpha Flight on a mission with the X-Men, and is transformed by the mystic Fire Fountain into a state Loki refers to as a 'demi-god'. She has increased leadership abilities along with vague powers that put her above all other humans. She rejects these powers when all involved learn it would come at the cost of humanity's creativity and the lives of anyone magical, such as her two friends Shaman and Snowbird.

After encountering Scramble and Deadly Ernest, Heather begins using a copy of her husband's battle-suit. Through extensive training by Wolverine, Heather is able to hold her own in a battle. Heather teams with Wolverine against Lady Deathstrike, and takes the name Vindicator. She becomes stranded in the Savage Land, and forms the mutated natives into a team called Alpha Prime.

Eventually her husband returns and her suit is altered to manipulate geothermal forces and she takes the name Guardian.

Heather and James have a baby (an as-yet-unnamed girl) and travel with their child and several other members of Alpha Flight to return a clutch of Plodex eggs to their homeworld. In addition, an accident brings temporal copies of most of the original Alpha Flight – from a time before her husband's "death" – to the present. This group includes a copy of Heather. While she is not a member, this "new" group is active as Alpha Flight while the originals are helping to rebuild the Plodex homeworld.

Vindicator, Sasquatch, Guardian, Shaman, Major Mapleleaf, and both Pucks are brutally attacked by a new villain named the Collective. They are killed and their bodies are left in the Yukon Territory as the Collective continues on to the United States.

During the Chaos War storyline, Vindicator, Guardian, Shaman, and Marrina Smallwood are resurrected after Death flees the underworld. Reuniting with Aurora, Northstar, Sasquatch, and Snowbird, Alpha Flight gets back together to fight the Great Beasts.

During the Fear Itself storyline, Vindicator helps Alpha Flight in fighting Attuma in the form of Nerkodd: Breaker of Oceans. When Alpha Flight returns to their headquarters, they are betrayed by Gary Cody and his newly elected Unity Party. Vindicator sides with Cody. It is shown that six weeks earlier, Guardian and Vindicator were unable to regain custody of their child. While bringing Guardian to the Box Units for imprisonment, Vindicator is ambushed by Puck, who knocks Vindicator out. After reclaiming her daughter Claire from her cousin, Vindicator assembles Alpha Strike (consisting of Persuasion, Ranark, a Wendigo, and a brainwashed Citadel) to spread the Unity program and take down Alpha Flight. It is later revealed that Vindicator and Department H had fallen under the control of Master of the World. Vindicator (still under the influence of the Master) helped Alpha Flight against Alpha Strike and then Master of the World attempts to kill their child Claire. He was killed by Alpha Flight, but Vindicator escapes with Claire. After the Unity Party is abolished, Vindicator leaves Canada with her daughter Claire.

Heather and Claire spend months on the run until Guardian, who never lost track of them, reluctantly follows orders to bring them to Department H on the condition that Heather and Claire would remain unharmed and safe. Through the use of virtual reality and neuro-stimulants, Guardian tricks Heather into believing she is being rescued by mercenaries and taken to a safehouse in British Columbia, when in reality was being taken to a prison and subjected to more mental brainwashing to trust Department H again.

During the "Fall of X" storyline, Heather escapes confinement and after leaving Claire with Marrina and Walt Samson, assumes the identity of Nemesis and rejoins Alpha Flight to help protect mutant refugees from Department H and Orchis. While most of her teammates are aware or her secret identity, Heather refuses to reveal herself to James, believing that she would do so when ready. Guardian eventually discovers Heather's identity after she is grievously wounded and falls unconscious following a battle with Department H's Box Sentinels. When Department H attacks Krakoa North to capture the mutant refugees, Heather teleports her mutant teammates and the refugees to the Alpha Flight Low-Orbit Space Station. Heather survives, but falls into a coma and is taken into Department H's medical care while James and the remaining Flight members are arrested for treason.

== Powers and abilities ==
Formerly, Vindicator wore the Guardian suit that her husband currently wears. Currently Heather's suit, which she first employed in Alpha Flight vol. 2, taps into a different source for its power. Instead of manipulating electromagnetic energies, this suit allows its wearer to control geothermal energy, allowing Heather to melt rock and manipulate the resulting lava, create jets of lava, create both hot and cold jets of water, including jets of steam and cooling sprays of water. The suit can absorb heat into its power cells, provides its wearer with a personal force field, and enables feats of super-strength and super-speed.

Heather is a master combat strategist, and received training in hand-to-hand combat from Puck and Wolverine.

While as Nemesis, Heather wields the mystical sword Scell, granting her ability to teleport herself and others and superhuman durability, protecting her from serious injuries. However, using Scell's abilities without taking a life drains Heather of her life-force. Due to Scell requiring the life-force of its victims to sustain itself, Heather's lack of victims with Scell causes the sword to drain her of her own life-force whenever she uses its teleportation abilities, worsening depending on the distance traveled and the number of people being teleported. As Heather's predecessors were undead and able to bypass Scell's requirement, Heather's continued use would result in her death.

== Other versions ==
=== Exiles ===
An alternate universe version of Heather Hudson from Earth-3470 appears in Exiles. This version is a black Canadian scientist who was transformed into Sasquatch after being accidentally exposed to gamma radiation. Hudson is later recruited into the Exiles by the Timebroker, replacing a brain-damaged Thunderbird. Shortly afterwards, Hudson meets Wolverine, who has been wandering the wilderness after escaping from Weapon X. Hudson successfully restores Wolverine's sanity, and the two later fall in love and marry. Two years later, Hudson is forced to kill Wolverine when Weapon X activates a hidden trigger in his mind. After years of mourning, Hudson remarries to Alpha Flight commander James Hudson, who had comforted her in her grief.

=== Ultimate Marvel ===
An alternate universe version of Heather Hudson from Earth-1610 appears in Ultimate Comics: X. This version resides in Florida and is the adoptive mother of Wolverine's son James Hudson. Additionally, the Vindicator name is used by John Wraith.

=== Age of Revelation ===
In the Age of Revelation timeline, Heather McNeil (Vindicator) survives outside the territories of Revelation and is married to Wolverine.

== In other media ==
=== Television ===
Heather Hudson appears in the X-Men: The Animated Series episode "Repo Man", voiced by Rebecca Jenkins.

=== Film ===
A loose depiction of Heather Hudson appears in X-Men Origins: Wolverine, portrayed by Julia Blake. This version is an elderly woman who is married to Travis Hudson and is later killed by Agent Zero.

=== Video games ===
- Heather Hudson as Vindicator appears in X-Men Legends II: Rise of Apocalypse.
- Heather Mason / Vindicator was considered to appear in Marvel Strike Force, but was dropped in favor of Sasquatch and Guardian.
