= Sasquatch (comics) =

- Sasquatch as depicted in Civil War: The Initiative (April 2007). Art by Marc Silvestri.

Publication information
- Publisher: Marvel Comics
- First appearance: The Uncanny X-Men #120 (April 1979)
- Created by: John Byrne; Chris Claremont

In-story information
- Alter ego: Walter Langkowski
- Species: Human mutate
- Team affiliations: Omega Flight; Alpha Flight; Beta Flight; Gamma Flight
- Notable aliases: Wanda Langkowski; Box; Tanaraq; Walt Samson
- Abilities: As Walter Langkowski: Genius-level intellect; As Sasquatch: Superhuman strength, stamina, endurance, durability, speed, agility, and senses; Accelerated healing; Sharp fangs and claws; As Walt Samson: Samson form

Sasquatch (Walter Langkowski) is a superhero appearing in American comic books published by Marvel Comics. The character first appeared in The Uncanny X-Men #120 (April 1979) and was created by John Byrne and Chris Claremont. Walter Langkowski is a scientist who turns himself into a Sasquatch-like creature through a controlled gamma-radiation experiment that links him to the god Tanaraq. He is a long-term and founding member of the superhero team Alpha Flight.

== Publication history ==
Sasquatch first appeared in The Uncanny X-Men #120 (April 1979) and was created by John Byrne and Chris Claremont.

== Fictional character biography ==
Dr. Walter "Walt" Langkowski is a founding member of Alpha Flight, a native of Vancouver, Canada, and a renowned physicist and professor at McGill University. He was also a professional football player for the Green Bay Packers. In the 1993 miniseries The Infinity Crusade, it is revealed that Langkowski is Jewish.

As Sasquatch, he has the ability to transform into a massive, orange-furred beast. In this form, Langkowski possesses enhanced physical attributes and natural weaponry.

=== Origin ===
Langkowski's alternate form is the result of self-experimentation with gamma radiation. In an attempt to replicate the process that transformed Bruce Banner into the Hulk, Langkowski bombarded himself with a gamma ray projector at an isolated laboratory near the Arctic Circle.

The experiment transformed Langkowski into a raging beast. He destroyed the laboratory and ran off into the Arctic wilderness before reverting to his human form. He was recovered by a Canadian search-and-rescue team and taken to a hospital for observation. While recovering, he told his colleague James Hudson (a.k.a. Guardian) to call him "Sasquatch."

Langkowski was baffled to discover his alter ego had orange fur instead of green skin (which is common to gamma mutates). He speculated that the gamma rays collected were contaminated by passage through the Aurora Borealis, which meant they might have included some cosmic rays as well.

However, unknown to Langkowski, it was not the gamma rays that turned him into Sasquatch. His lab equipment opened a doorway between their world and the "Realm of the Great Beasts," monsters from Canada's prehistoric past. When the gap opened, a mystical beast named Tanaraq switched places with Langkowski's body, granting him the beast's physical powers. These included superhuman strength and endurance.

His metamorphosis was triggered by willpower, sometimes requiring a few moments of meditation. Further, Langkowski had no difficulty maintaining his personality and intelligence while in Sasquatch form.

=== Alpha Flight ===
As a founding member of the Canadian superhero team Alpha Flight, Sasquatch battled the X-Men in an attempt to capture Wolverine. The fight between the two teams caused a huge amount of property damage at the Calgary Stampede shopping area, as well as the loss of a DC-10 that Sasquatch flung into a hangar.

Sasquatch later battled the Hulk, to test his own physical limits, then fought alongside the Hulk against the Wendigo.

Not long after, Alpha Flight was officially disbanded by its government agency, Department H. However, when Guardian called upon the scattered team members, he joined Alpha Flight to take down the Great Beast Tundra.

The team soon after worked with Namor, and the Invisible Woman, encountering the Master of the World. On his own, he faced the Super-Skrull. and then rejoined the team to fight Omega Flight in New York City, where the team lost Guardian.

Alongside Rom, Alpha Flight fought the Dire Wraiths. and then joined the X-Men on a journey to Asgard, where they clashed with Loki.

=== Tanaraq ===
While shopping with his girlfriend Aurora, Sasquatch encountered and fought a new armored villain, Calibre. Shot in the chest and seriously injured, Langkowski lost control, allowing the spirit of Tanaraq to inhabit Sasquatch. Tanaraq threatened to kill Aurora and wreak havoc. Confronted by Walt's teammate Snowbird, Tanaraq was killed when Snowbird transformed into a white-furred Sasquatch and ripped out the beast's heart. Upon the body's death, Langkowski's spirit was lost.

=== New Body and Identity ===
After his death, Langkowski's teammates traveled to the realm of the Great Beasts to recover his soul. However, a preservation spell cast by Alpha Flight's sorcerer Shaman failed to prevent Langkowski's body from crumbling to dust.

Once in the land of the Great Beasts, they were attacked by the monsters' leader Somon, who summoned his allies Tundra, Kariooq, and Tolomaq against them. Snowbird battled Somon, eventually forcing him to relinquish control of the others; leaderless, the monsters turned on each other and ignored Alpha Flight.

Forcing the now-weakened Somon to reveal to them the location of Langkowski's spirit, Alpha Flight ventured to the Pit of Ultimate Sadness, located beneath the Great Glow-Globe of Phistash-Hasrak, where Somon explained that the souls of those who once inhabited the realm existed in torment. Somon told them that, to enter the Pit's Well of Sorrows, they must sacrifice love, hate, and power. Sending Aurora (representing love), Northstar (representing hate), and Talisman (representing power), Alpha Flight realized the Well was a trap set by Somon.

Snowbird killed Somon and three trapped Alphans were reunited with the rest of the team. Shaman deduced from Somon's trap that no actual souls still remained within the Well of Sorrows but rather, the only wandering soul (Walter's) resided within the Glow-Globe of Phistash-Hasrak. Containing Walter's soul within a globe of its own from his pouch, Shaman then transported Alpha Flight back to Earth, where they met with Heather Hudson and Box.

Lacking a body, in desperation, Shaman projected the soul into the robot Box, who had arrived as the Alphans returned to Earth. After searching for a habitable but mindless body, Langkowski and Box's creator, Roger Bochs, eventually found a nearly-mindless humanoid in another dimension. However, when the pair projected Langkowski's soul along an interdimensional "fishing line", it turned out to be the Hulk. Langkowski, unwilling to displace his colleague and friend Bruce Banner (despite Banner's pleas to the contrary), let his soul dissipate into the interdimensional void.

=== Return and "White Sasquatch" ===
Langkowski survives and returns soon afterward by temporarily inhabiting the shrunken, mindless body of Smart Alec, which had been kept in Shaman's pouch. He then switched over to occupy Snowbird's then-deceased body with her permission. In Snowbird's body, Walt lacked Snowbird's shapeshifting powers and was limited to either Snowbird's (female) human form and a white-furred version of his Sasquatch form. Now biologically female, she called herself "Wanda Langkowski", and fought to be recognized as legally alive. Snowbird's spirit later altered her former body to be identical of his original self. After this, Sasquatch regained his original orange coloration.

Among his later adventures with Alpha Flight, Walt battled Llan the Sorcerer, then joined the Avengers, and the People's Protectorate against the Atlantean army, the Peace Corpse, and the Combine. The team also helped defend Her against the Consortium.

=== 2000s: New Teams, New Troubles ===
In 2005, Sasquatch assembled another incarnation of Alpha Flight to rescue the original team from an alien race known as the Plodex. Sales were poor and the series was canceled with issue #12.

Along with Major Mapleleaf, Puck (both Eugene Judd and Zuzha Yu), Vindicator, Shaman, and Guardian, Sasquatch fights The Collective. He is later revealed to be the only member of Alpha Flight to survive the attack. Following the events of the 2006 "Civil War" storyline, Langkowski is recruited by the Canadian government to form a new team called Omega Flight. He goes out of control when possessed by the Great Beast, Tanaraq, but manages to recover. He also forgives Michael Pointer for the indirect role he played in the destruction of Alpha Flight and apologized for forcing him into the role of Guardian.

Along with American mutants Wolfsbane, Thornn, and Feral, Sasquatch went to Wakanda to help Wolverine against Sabretooth. Feral was killed by Sabretooth while the villain Romulus made plans of his own involving the group.

During the 2010 "Chaos War" storyline, Sasquatch made a deal with the Great Beasts, bringing them to Earth so they can kill Amatusu-Mikaboshi. Teaming up with Snowbird, Northstar, and Aurora, they reunited with a resurrected Guardian, Vindicator, Shaman, and Marrina Smallwood.

During the 2011 "Fear Itself" storyline, Sasquatch was seen helping Alpha Flight fight Attuma (in the form of Nerkodd: Breaker of Oceans) while saving people from a cataclysmic flood. Once Nerkodd was defeated, Alpha Flight was almost immediately betrayed by former ally Gary Cody and his newly elected Unity Party. When in the custody of the Unity Party, Sasquatch's gamma energy is drained enough for him to revert to his human form.

At Parliament Hill--the heart of the Canadian government--Walt is told by Agent Jeff Brown that concussions sustained when he played football will cause him to act less human when he changes back into Sasquatch. Jeff also tells Walt that he will soon achieve Unity. Walt is later freed by Shaman who knocks out Brown. The team was instrumental in exposing Unity as a front for a planned takeover of Canada.

As part of the 2015 All-New, All-Different Marvel branding, Sasquatch was as part of the Alpha Flight space program and was among the heroes stranded in space when Captain America (secretly a Hydra agent at that time) closed a force field around Earth.

==== Immortal Hulk ====
While taking time off from the Alpha Flight space program, Walt met a reporter named Jackie McGee and agreed to aid her in her search for Bruce Banner. After Walt was stabbed breaking up a fight between two men, he wound up in the hospital where he turned into Sasquatch that night. After killing doctors that were treating him, Sasquatch encounters Hulk who realized Walt was possessed by Brian Banner's ghost. Hulk freed Sasquatch from Brian's possession by draining enough gamma energy to depower Walt. It was revealed that Brian's possession of Sasquatch was caused by the One Below All.

Arriving in Reno, Nevada, Walter and Gamma Flight find the Subject B husk in which the U.S. Hulk Operations placed Rick Jones' body. They take the husk to the Alpha Flight Low-Orbit Space Station for study. Reginald Fortean raids the station to reclaim the Subject B husk, killing Walter in the process.

=== Doc Sasquatch and Walt Samson ===
In the Below Place, Samson discovered that gamma mutates had a way back to life by means of a green door opened by the One Below All. Anyone with gamma radiation could self-resurrect this way, so long as the door was open. However, the Leader had learned how to manipulate the doors, including figuring out how to close them.

With his door in the Below Place obstructed, Doc Samson searches for an alternative. He discovers one and resurrects himself by inhabiting Walt Langkowski's body, taking the alias "Doc Sasquatch". Meanwhile, Walt returns the favor by occupying Samson's body, renaming himself Walt Samson.

== Powers and abilities ==
As Sasquatch, Langkowski possessed abnormal strength and stamina, as well as resistance to injury (in an early appearance, he fought the Hulk for "fun" in order to test his limits). He is strong enough to pull a naval destroyer ashore for repairs, as well as hold a DC-10 cargo plane against the thrust of its engines and then hurl it over 1,000 feet backward. Thanks to his thick fur, he can survive easily in extreme arctic environments. Sasquatch is able to jump vast distances, but not as well as the Hulk. His claws are sharp and durable enough to cut through stone, wood, and even some metals. Though his human body requires corrective lenses, Langkowski's vision as Sasquatch was better than human. He also heals with unnatural speed, as demonstrated when Walt's arm, broken by Super-Skrull, healed when he changed into Sasquatch.

As Walt Samson, he has all the powers of Doc Samson.

Early in his career, switching between forms at will caused Langkowski considerable physical discomfort. To alleviate the pain, he recited a mantra while focusing on his body. However, after many months of practice, he could effect the transformations with relative ease, without the need for meditative yoga.

Langkowski is a professionally trained scientist with knowledge of both physics and biophysics. He has experience dealing with many forms of experimental radiation and their mutagenic properties on lifeforms under controlled settings. As a former football player, Langkowski has athletic strength and endurance, though he is no longer in peak condition. Sasquatch also has learned some combat skills, although he relies chiefly on brute force.

== Other characters named Sasquatch ==
=== Sasquatch race ===
A race of Sasquatches were discovered to live in the forests of British Columbia. They are first seen in Alpha Flight vol. 2 #1. Once a year, the Sasquatches gather at the City of Sasquatches in secret, where they worship their forgotten gods and breed with one another.

One Sasquatch named Murkfoot that lived in the 1000s was the Sorcerer Supreme and a member of the Avengers of 1,000 AD.

=== Warwolf version ===
One of Mojo II's Warwolves posed as Sasquatch and joined the other disguised Warwolves in fighting Wolverine. They were defeated by Wolverine, Longshot, Dazzler, and the X-Babies.

=== Actual Sasquatch ===
One of these Sasquatches, a barely intelligent monster, is mistaken by Langkowski's teammates to be a highly degenerated Langkowski, but it was an actual Bigfoot that had been captured by Department H. He is kept in control by the touch of the superpowered Murmur, though not always successfully. This Sasquatch dies in a conflict with Department H's corrupt leadership and the Zodiac.

=== Howling Commandos' Sasquatch ===
Another Sasquatch appears in the 2005–2006 Nick Fury's Howling Commandos series as a member of that titular group. What, if any, connection this character has to Walter Langkowski or the Sasquatch from Alpha Flight volume 2, is not revealed. He is first seen helping the Abominable Snowman to track down Groot.

== Other versions ==
=== Doppelganger ===
A doppelganger of Sasquatch was created by Magus in Infinity War #1 and appeared in Infinity War #1, 5, Fantastic Four #369-370 and Wonder Man vol. 2 #15.

=== Exiles ===
An original incarnation of Sasquatch, Heather Hudson, from Earth-3470 appears in Exiles.

=== Marvel Zombies ===
In the Marvel Zombies comics set in the universe of Earth-2149, the zombified Alpha Flight attack the X-Men and are eventually killed by Magneto.

=== Old Man Logan ===
An alternate universe version of Sasquatch from an unidentified universe appears in Old Man Logan (vol. 2) #17, where he is killed during the supervillain uprising.

=== Ultimate Marvel ===
An original incarnation of Sasquatch, Rahne Sinclair, appears in the Ultimate Marvel imprint.

=== What If? ===
Sasquatch appears in several What If stories:

- In "What If? Logan Battled Weapon X", Walter Langkowski is shown working with James Hudson as a scientist in Department H. He is killed off-panel by a man who was captured and laced with adamantium instead of Logan.
- Langkowski appears as Sasquatch in "What If? Wolverine Was the Leader of Alpha Flight". He fights under Wolverine's lead in battles with Annihilus and the Hellfire Club.

== In other media ==
=== Television ===
Sasquatch (right) as he appears in The Incredible Hulk

- Sasquatch appears in the X-Men: The Animated Series episode "Repo Man", voiced by Harvey Atkin. This version is a member of Alpha Flight.
- Walter Langkowski / Sasquatch appears in The Incredible Hulk episode "Man to Man, Beast to Beast", voiced by Peter Strauss and Clancy Brown respectively. This version is an old friend of Bruce Banner who is unable to return to human form following his transformation into the Sasquatch.

=== Video games ===
- An evil doppelganger of Sasquatch appears in Marvel Super Heroes in War of the Gems.
- Sasquatch appears as a playable character in Marvel Super Hero Squad Online.
- Sasquatch appears as a playable character in Marvel Strike Force, being added as part of an Alpha Flight-themed vote.
- Sasquatch appears as a playable card in Marvel Snap.
- Walter Langkowski / Sasquatch appears in Marvel's Wolverine, voiced by Jeffrey Nordling. This version is a member of Team X and a dormant mutant who, after being captured by the Hand, agrees to help them build a Helix Engine in exchange for using it to activate his X-gene. However, this transforms Langkowski into a feral ape-like creature; after being subdued by Wolverine and Jean Grey, he is experimented on by Nathaniel Essex, further breaking his psyche, and eventually compels Wolverine to kill him.

=== Merchandise ===
Sasquatch received two figures in Hasbro's Marvel Legends line, with the first being released in wave 12 and the second as a build-a-figure as part of a Deadpool-themed wave.

=== Miscellaneous ===
Sasquatch appears in the Wolverine versus Sabretooth motion comic, voiced by Trevor Devall.
