= Madison Jeffries =

Marvel Comics superhero

Publication information
- Publisher: Marvel Comics
- First appearance: Alpha Flight #1 (Aug. 1983)
- Created by: John Byrne

In-story information
- Species: Human mutant
- Team affiliations: Exiles; X-Men; X-Club; Weapon X Alpha Flight; Gamma Flight; Zodiac
- Notable aliases: Box; Gemini
- Abilities: Technokinetic ability to reshape plastic, metal, and glass to any shape desired Technopathy ability to mentally communicate with A.I., such as machines, robots and cyberware Technoformic capacity to physically/mentally merge with and augment his BOX warsuit via mechanical assimilation Intuitive Inventing.

Madison Jeffries is a superhero appearing in American comic books published by Marvel Comics. The character is depicted as having the ability to reshape plastic, metal, and glass to any desired shape. He also possesses the technopathic ability to mentally communicate with A.I., such as machines and robots. Additionally, Madison Jeffries is the brother of Scramble. The character first appeared in Alpha Flight #1 (Aug. 1983), and was created by John Byrne.

He also appears as an NPC in the video game Marvel Heroes, voiced by Richard Epcar.

== Fictional character biography ==
As a young man, Madison Jeffries volunteered to enlist as a soldier in Vietnam alongside his younger brother Lionel. While Madison preferred not to use his mutant abilities to restructure metal, glass, and plastic, Lionel used his abilities to reshape organic materials to heal wounded soldiers. However, when Lionel attempted to use his powers to revive dead soldiers with grotesque results, he went insane, and Madison was forced to use his own powers to bind his brother. Lionel, as Scramble, was committed to a psychiatric ward in Montreal General Hospital, and Madison left the military.

Madison met and befriended a man named Roger Bochs at a clinic for physically disabled persons. The two became friends, and Madison used his mutant powers to help Bochs create his Box robot. They were discovered by James Hudson, a.k.a. Weapon Alpha, and recruited into the new Alpha Flight program.

During the Canadian government's first sanctioning of Alpha Flight and its parent organization, Department H, Madison remains in the third-tier Gamma Flight program, while Bochs and his cybernetically-controlled robot Box reach the Beta Flight level. When the Canadian government cuts Department H's funding, Madison leaves the organization and finds employment digging ditches.

After Alpha Flight returns to Canada, Roger Bochs (who is still working independently) recruits Madison to rebuild his damaged Box robot and seek revenge against Omega Flight. Bochs and Madison reconfigure Box using a "living metal" that allows Bochs to physically merge with the robot, freeing him from his physical limitations.

During the Krakoan Age, Madison Jeffries becomes a citizen of Krakoa, a living island that was established as a mutant nation. However, he is imprisoned for attempting to assist Danger by creating an artificial environment for her, which Krakoa is unable to accept as part of itself. After escaping from prison, Madison and the Exiles track Sabretooth to Noble Island, a site used for human experimentation. Madison is confronted by the experiments, who kill him.

== Powers and abilities ==
Madison Jeffries is a mutant with the ability to manipulate inorganic materials such as plastic, metal, and glass. He can manipulate these materials on microscopic levels, as well as transfer his consciousness and physical being into them, creating living avatars and mechs of inorganic material. He has been shown to also have a form of technopathy, with the ability to communicate and begin a relationship with the robot Danger. He also has a form of intuitive inventive intelligence due to his powers, similar to Forge.

== Alternate versions ==
=== Age of Apocalypse ===
In the "Age of Apocalypse" reality, Madison Jeffries joins Apocalypse's cause and is a member of the Brotherhood of Chaos, an elite religious group affiliated with the Church of the Madri.

=== Age of X-Man ===
In the "Age of X-Man" reality, Madison Jeffries is a history instructor at the Summers Institute of Higher Learning, located in Westchester County, New York.

=== House of M ===
In the "House of M" reality, Madison Jeffries is forced by Weapon X to create anti-mutant weapons.

=== Weapon X: Days of Future Now ===
In the alternate future depicted in Weapon X: Days of Future Now, Madison's Boxbots have gained sentience, with one of them calling itself Master Mold.

== In other media ==
Madison Jeffries appears in Marvel Heroes, voiced by Richard Epcar.
