= Beta Flight =

Fictional superhero team

Publication information
- Publisher: Marvel Comics
- First appearance: Alpha Flight #1
- Created by: John Byrne

In-story information
- Member(s): none, Defunct

Roster

Beta Flight is a fictional superhero team appearing in American comic books published by Marvel Comics. Along with Gamma Flight, Beta Flight is one of the "minor leagues" of the Canadian team Alpha Flight. Originally, Beta Flight was the intermediate level team. Members are more experienced than the raw recruits of Gamma Flight but not yet ready to join Alpha Flight. When members of Beta Flight prove themselves worthy they are promoted to Alpha Flight.

== Publication history ==
Beta Flight first appeared in Alpha Flight #1 and was created by John Byrne.

== Fictional team history ==
Beta Flight was first mentioned as Department H's secondary team behind Alpha Flight. Department H was defunded in that issue, thus ending government support of the Flight teams. Two members of Beta Flight, Puck and Marrina, were already cleared to join Alpha Flight and were called up with the rest of Alpha Flight to assist Vindicator against the Great Beast Tundra, by Heather Hudson. All other members were shown in a single panel. While Alpha Flight continued on their own, this Beta Flight was left to be disbanded along with Department H. The other two members, Box and Flashback along with the members of Gamma Flight were recruited by Jerome Jaxon, an old enemy of Hudson, to join Omega Flight, a criminal organisation. Box planned to spy on Jaxon but was discovered and Jaxon used the Box system as a part of Omega Flight in attacking Guardian.

Under the leadership of Heather Hudson as Vindicator, an independent Alpha Flight restarted the Beta Flight team as a trainee team starting with Purple Girl. Beta Flight gains three additional members (Goblyn, Manikin, and Pathway) by issue 55.

After the Canadian government restarts Department H, Beta gains new members from the former rival government sponsor team, Gamma Flight, and remains the raw recruit team, while Gamma Flight is instead used to refer to Department H's support sections. Department H and all Flight sections are shut down soon after the Canadian Superhuman Registration Act is passed.

After Department H and Alpha Flight are reformed with an almost new group of heroes and administrators, a classified Beta Flight wing of headquarters was established. It was later revealed to have held three young superhumans who were the subjects of secret experiments. When additional members of the earlier Alpha Flight return, several newer members are demoted to form a new Beta Flight. With the loss of several members' powers due to Decimation, the death of most of Alpha Flight, and the disbanding of Department H, it is presumed that Beta Flight is no longer operational.
