= Omega Flight =

Group of fictional characters

Publication information
- Publisher: Marvel Comics
- First appearance: Alpha Flight #11 (June 1984)
- Created by: John Byrne

Omega Flight is a fictional team of superbeings appearing in American comic books published by Marvel Comics. Omega Flight is one of the few Canadian teams published by an American comic book company. Omega Flight first appeared in the pages of Alpha Flight as a supervillain team. Some later incarnations have been composed of heroes.

== Publication history ==
Omega Flight first appeared in Alpha Flight #11–13 (June–August 1984).

A new lineup of the team is assembled by the Master in Alpha Flight #110–112 (July–September 1992).

The next version of the team, known as Omega Flight, is a group of heroes. The team made their first appearance in the one-shot Civil War: The Initiative (April 2007) and moved on to their own series, Omega Flight #1–5.

The most recent incarnation of the team was a group of heroes assembled by Department H, who have only appeared in Avengers vol. 5, #9–10 (June 2013).

== Team biography ==
=== Jerry Jaxon's team ===
Omega Flight is assembled with the purpose of "destroying Alpha Flight", particularly its founder, Guardian. Delphine Courtney, the robotic assistant to Jerry Jaxon, recruits superhuman operatives to Omega Flight using a device which heightens the operatives' feelings of paranoia and aggression. Jaxon had been Guardian's boss and blamed Guardian for his dismissal. All of Courtney's recruits were members of the disbanded Beta and Gamma Flights. It included:

- Delphine Courtney (MX39147) - Courtney is a robot with superhuman strength and durability, along with enhanced sight and hearing. She is destroyed by Madison Jeffries.
- Diamond Lil (Lillian Crawley) – Diamond Lil is a mutant with a bio-aura force field, giving her superhuman durability. She is killed in Selene's attack on Utopia.
- Flashback (Gardner Monroe) – Flashback is a mutant with the ability to bring future versions of himself into the present.
- Jerry Jaxon – Jaxon is a human who controls the Box robot as a member of the team. He is killed by feedback when Vindicator overloads the robot.
- Smart Alec (Alexander Thorne) – Smart Alec is a super-genius. He is killed when he looks into Shaman's pouch, destroying his mind.
- Wild Child (Kyle Gibney) – Wild Child is a mutant with superhuman speed, agility, reflexes and senses. He also has a healing factor, retractable claws and limited ability to communicate with animals. He is killed when Omega Red throws him into molten steel.

Following Jaxon's death, it is revealed that the rest of Omega Flight took "destroying Alpha Flight" to mean simply defeating them in battle, and even while four members of Alpha Flight were their captives, Omega Flight did them no lasting harm. Following this second skirmish with Alpha Flight, the Beyonder defeats Omega Flight, forcing them to flee. Their escape is blocked by Madison Jeffries, a former Flight trainee whom Courtney did not recruit because of his ability to control machines and his loyalty to Guardian. Jeffries destroys Courtney and turns the rest of Omega Flight over to police.

=== Master of the World's team ===
The second incarnation is organized by the Master of the World. Again the purpose of the team's creation is to destroy Alpha Flight. The membership includes:

- Bile (Tom Preston) – Bile has the ability to secrete viruses, giving him a deadly touch.
- Brain Drain (Werner Schmidt) – Brain Drain is a human who uses alien technology to control the minds of others.
- Miss Mass (Gillian Pritikin) – Miss Mass possesses superhuman strength and density.
- Sinew (William Knox) – Sinew has the appearance of a tailed animal. He has enhanced physical abilities.
- Strongarm (Steve Caidin) – Strongarm is a human with cybernetically enhanced right arm, granting him superhuman strength.
- Tech-Noir (Gale Cameron) – Tech-Noir is a cyborg with the power of flight and rocket launchers in her wrists.

=== Initiative team ===
Omega Flight, art by Scott Kolins

This team emerges from the aftermath of Marvel's Civil War crossover storyline. The lineup includes elements of the original Canadian super-team Alpha Flight, as well as American superheroes on loan from S.H.I.E.L.D. thanks to Iron Man and the Initiative. The team roster was meant to include Arachne, Michael Pointer as the new Guardian, Sasquatch, U.S. Agent, Beta Ray Bill and Talisman, but changes to the story after Omega Flight was reduced to a limited series meant that the final two never actually joined the team.

Former Alpha Flight member Sasquatch acts as recruiter for the team. After his attempts at recruiting Talisman are rebuffed, Sasquatch is forced to battle the rampaging Wrecking Crew alone, and is defeated. Upon learning of her friend's capture, Talisman accepts the offer to join Omega Flight, even for a temporary basis. As the Wrecking Crew carve a path of destruction towards Toronto, Talisman, driven by a series of mysterious visions, joins up with U.S. Agent and Arachne in Ottawa, but not before lambasting Iron Man and blaming him for the supervillain crisis that has engulfed Canada. Somewhat concerned about the presence of Americans on a Canadian superhero team, Talisman reacts violently when she learns that Michael Pointer, the man who killed Alpha Flight as the Collective, has become the new Guardian.

Meanwhile, the Wrecking Crew (along with the captured Sasquatch) storm into the Royal Ontario Museum (ROM) in Toronto, drawn there by visions. Also present in the ROM is Simon Walters, the human avatar of Beta Ray Bill, who has also been receiving the visions leading him to the ROM's exhibit on the Great Beasts. Opening a portal to the Realm of the Great Beasts, the Wrecking Crew is further empowered by Tanaraq, who also summons a horde of Surtur demons to aid the Crew in destroying the world. Walters unveils himself as Beta Ray Bill and engages the villains, who prove too strong for the Korbinite warrior to handle. As the Wrecking Crew and the Surtur demons spill out onto the streets of Toronto, Talisman, Arachne and U.S. Agent arrive to confront them. Tanaraq possesses and empowers Sasquatch. The team is saved by the eleventh-hour intervention of Pointer, who devastates the ranks of demons and even throws away the Wrecking Crew, but refuses to kill the possessed Sasquatch even as his life is threatened by him.

With no other viable options left, Talisman uses the power of Shaman's medicine bag to exorcise Tanaraq's hold over Sasquatch and the Wrecking Crew, draining them of their newfound powers. Seizing the bag, Beta Ray Bill lures the demons back into the Realm of the Great Beasts. Forcing Guardian to seal the portal behind him, he effectively sacrifices himself to save the planet. With Tanaraq's plot foiled and the Surtur demons locked away, Omega Flight defeat the Wrecking Crew and bring them into S.H.I.E.L.D. custody.

After the battle, the team begins to establish itself as a functioning unit. Guardian moves past his guilt over his role in the Collective incident. U.S. Agent retrieves his genuine shield from the Purple Man, Sasquatch helps out with the reconstruction efforts in Toronto but afterwards is still guilt-ridden over what he did while possessed and disappears. Talisman retires from active duty to serve as her tribe's shaman. Arachne remains with the team. The series ends with Beta Ray Bill locked in eternal combat with the Surtur demons in the Realm of the Great Beasts, trapped in the nightmare plane, but uncaring for his seemingly hopeless situation. However, Bill escapes from his imprisonment and aids Thor against the Skrull invasion of Asgard.

Marvel Comics Presents follows up on the limited series with a story regarding Pointer's powers, and his adjustment to the Guardian suit.

U.S. Agent officially leaves the team in order to join the new team of Mighty Avengers, while Pointer adopts the alias Weapon Omega and joins Norman Osborn and Emma Frost's Dark X-Men. Beta Ray Bill goes to space. Arachne reappears in Manhattan during the "Grim Hunt" storyline. Thus, this incarnation of Omega Flight appears to have disbanded.

=== Department H's team ===
As part of the Marvel NOW! event, a new incarnation of Omega Flight appears under the control of Department H. It consists of Validator, Boxx, Kingdom and a Wendigo. Omega Flight is sent in by Department H to investigate one of the Origin Bomb sites left by Ex Nihilo in Regina, Canada. Validator is changed by the Origin Bomb site while the rest of the Omega Flight members are killed in action.

== Collected editions ==
Title	Material collected	Published date	ISBN
Omega Flight: Alpha To Omega	Omega Flight #1-5	November 2007	978-0785124412
Weapon Omega	Material from Marvel Comics Presents (vol. 2) #1–12	November 2008	978-0785134152

== In other media ==
Omega Flight appears in Marvel Future Revolution. This version is an interdimensional organization that unites heroes from different realities to find a solution to the Convergence and protect Primary Earth.

== See also ==
- Avengers: The Initiative
- List of Flight members
