= Gamma Flight =

Fictional comic book heroes

Publication information
- Publisher: Marvel Comics
- First appearance: First Team: Alpha Flight #1 (August 1983); Second Team: Alpha Flight #76 (1989); Third Team: The Immortal Hulk #8 (January 2019)
- Created by: John Byrne; James D. Hudnall

In-story information
- Base(s): Canada
- Member(s): Flight Level: Diamond Lil; Madison Jeffries; Smart Alec; Wild Child; Premiere Canada Team: Auric; Nemesis; Silver; Wild Child; Witchfire; Space Program; Titania; Puck; Absorbing Man; Rick Jones/Del Frye; Doc Sasquatch; Dr. Charlene McGowan

Gamma Flight is the name of three fictional Canadian teams of superheroes appearing in American comic books published by Marvel Comics.

== Publication history ==
The first version of Gamma Flight debuted in Alpha Flight #1 and was created by John Byrne.

The third version of Gamma Flight was introduced in The Immortal Hulk #8 (January 2019), and was created by writer Al Ewing. This version of the team consists of Absorbing Man, Puck, Titania, Sasquatch, Rick Jones, and Charlene McGowan. In 2021, Gamma Flight received a five-issue solo miniseries, which was written by Ewing and Crystal Frasier.

== Fictional team biography ==
=== Flight tier level ===
Gamma Flight first appeared in Alpha Flight #1 (August 1983).

The original Gamma Flight is the first tier in the three-tier process of becoming a member of Alpha Flight as instituted by Department H. After a training period, the recruits would eventually be upgraded to Beta Flight and then to Alpha Flight, the premiere official superhero team of Canada. The members were Diamond Lil, Smart Alec, Wild Child, and Madison Jeffries.

=== Canadian government sanctioned team ===
The Canadian government founds a new sanctioned superhero team after the disappearance of Alpha Flight. This Gamma Flight includes Nemesis, Wild Child, Silver, Auric and Witchfire. With Alpha Flight implicated in various misdeeds, Gamma Flight is ordered to capture them. This team is later disbanded in a merger with Department H and Alpha Flight, with some members leaving.

=== Support operation ===
In a revived Department H, Gamma Flight refers to support operations.

=== Alpha Flight Space Program version ===
After Hulk escapes from Reginald Fortean's custody, a depowered Walter Langkowski forms a new version of Gamma Flight to pursue Hulk, with Puck as its first member.

Langkowski and Gamma Flight arrive at the site of the gamma bomb that first turned Bruce Banner into Hulk. As Hulk battles Gamma Flight, Absorbing Man absorbs the leftover gamma radiation that enabled the One Below All to plunge New Mexico into the Below-Place. After Hulk defeats the One Below All, Langkowski and Gamma Flight return to Earth, where Absorbing Man joins the group.

With Titania as its latest member, Langkowski and Gamma Flight encounter Doc Samson, who reveals to them Hulk's plans to wipe out the human civilization.

Arriving in Reno, Nevada, Langkowski and Gamma Flight find the Subject B husk containing Rick Jones' body. They take Rick's husk to the Alpha Flight Low-Orbit Space Station for study. Wearing the Hulkbuster-Redeemer armor, Fortean raids the Alpha Flight Low-Orbit Space Station and reclaims the husk.

== Collected editions ==
Title	Material collected	Published date	ISBN
Gamma Flight	Gamma Flight #1-5	January 2022	978-1302928063
