= Marrina Smallwood =

- Art by John Byrne

Publication information
- Publisher: Marvel Comics
- First appearance: Alpha Flight #1 (August 1983)
- Created by: John Byrne

In-story information
- Species: Plodex
- Team affiliations: Alpha Flight; Beta Flight; Avengers
- Notable aliases: Leviathan
- Abilities: Underwater breathing Transformation; Superhuman speed while swimming, Limited water control

Marrina Smallwood is a fictional character appearing in American comic books published by Marvel Comics. She is a member of Alpha Flight and an honorary member of the Avengers.

== Publication history ==
Marrina Smallwood first appeared in Alpha Flight #1 (August 1983) and was created by John Byrne. Byrne has clarified that Marrina was created after the Alpha Flight title was greenlit, and was not a character he had thought up earlier.

Namor writer Glenn Herdling said that issue #61 was his favorite of the series. He stated: "I had never been comfortable with how Namor had used the Black Knight's Ebony Blade to slay Marrina, even though she was a mindless leviathan at the time. Being slain by the Ebony Blade is a fate worse than death. The enchanted blade actually traps the souls of its victims in its obsidian void rather than allowing them to roam free to meet their eternal reward. In one fell stroke, Namor had condemned his wife's soul to an eternity of hell. Two years earlier, I had created a character called Bloodwraith, who was the new (and nastier!) wielder of the blade. The connection that Namor had to the Ebony Blade made the Blood Wraith's presence an organic progression of the story rather than a forced guest appearance. In the end, Namor got to free his wife's soul. By redeeming Marrina, he redeemed himself."

== Fictional character biography ==
Marrina is a member of an alien species called the Plodex, which sends its eggs to various planets. When the eggs hatch, young Plodex take the forms of the native species they encounter.

As an egg, Marrina landed in the Atlantic Ocean about 40,000 years ago, at the turn between the Middle Paleolithic and the Upper Paleolithic, and remained dormant for thousands of years. This incubation place was responsible for her adaptations to aquatic environments. The egg was found by fisherman Tom Smallwood as he was drowning during a storm. It proved buoyant enough to bring him to the surface and thus save his life. Tom took it home to Newfoundland, Canada. The egg was opened prematurely by his wife Gladys, causing Marrina to imprint a humanoid female form. The Smallwoods accepted her as their daughter.

Marrina left home at sixteen years of age to join Beta Flight, a team of superheroes trained and funded by the Canadian government. After performing well in Beta Flight, Marrina is promoted to Alpha Flight, although her field duties only begin after the team went freelance. She learns of her alien origin when captured by the Master of the World, and is rescued by Alpha Flight and Namor alongside the Invisible Woman. Following this she leaves Alpha Flight and stays with Namor. Marrina is captured by Attuma, and reverts to savagery for the third time but overcomes it. Marrina marries her lover, Namor. She serves alongside him on Avengers missions and receives honorary membership, and also serves as the queen of Deluvia.

When Marrina begins exhibiting pregnancy-like symptoms, the Plodex DNA reacts to her condition by turning her into a Leviathan-like monster. Namor is forced to kill her with the Black Knight's Ebony Blade.

It is later revealed that Marrina survived and had entered a state of hibernation. During the Dark Reign event, Norman Osborn recovers Marrina's body and splices her with shark DNA, transforming her into a bloodthirsty Leviathan-like form. Once released, Marrina wreaks havoc in Atlantis, forcing Namor to kill her once more.

During the Chaos War storyline, Marrina and Alpha Flight members Guardian, Vindicator, and Shaman return from the dead when Death leaves the underworld, enabling them to escape.

== Powers and abilities ==
Thanks to her genetic structure that is a hybrid combination of Plodex and Earth DNA, Marrina's body is amphibious, and she has pale yellow skin, large fish-like eyes, and webbed hands and feet. Possessing both lungs and gills, she can breathe and exist indefinitely on land or under the sea. She is able to withstand freezing temperatures and underwater pressures without harm. Her hydrodynamic proportions, sleek skin, webbed extremities, and superhuman strength aid in her swimming. She can sustain underwater speeds approaching 51 knots (roughly 59 mph) for several hours and is capable of massive acceleration by shedding her skin to expose a nearly frictionless inner skin layer, allowing her to briefly reach speeds in the 800–900 kn (1,500–1,700 km/h; 920–1,040 mph) range. She has further demonstrated some ability to control water — in combination with her massive underwater speed, she was able to raise and ride the crest of a huge waterspout, letting her travel from an ocean shore up to three miles inland. After such feats, her outer skin layer can quickly regenerate to normal. Her skin also secretes an oil which can cause extreme constriction of the pupils — with one slap, she was able to temporarily blind Namor, himself superhumanly adapted to underwater existence. On dry land, she can sprint at tremendous speeds.

Although Marrina has a friendly personality, thanks to her upbringing by her foster parents, her mental programming by the Plodex repeatedly emerges from her subconscious mind. Her savage instincts can even be triggered by chemical stimuli given off by other Plodex. When her Plodex DNA takes over, she takes on a more beast-like appearance, gaining claws that easily cut through most material. Marrina can change shape to an unknown degree under the influence of her savage instincts. During her pregnancy, Marrina resembled a sea serpent and was over a mile in length. She also displayed the ability to discharge eye beams of pure kinetic force while in leviathan form.

== Other versions ==
- An alternate universe version of Marrina Smallwood from Earth-3470 appears in Exiles.
- An alternate universe version of Marrina Smallwood from Earth-58163 makes a cameo appearance in House of M #6.
