= Persuasion (comics) =

Purple Woman

Publication information
- Publisher: Marvel Comics
- First appearance: Alpha Flight #41 (December 1986)
- Created by: Bill Mantlo; David Ross

In-story information
- Alter ego: Kara Killgrave
- Species: Human mutant
- Team affiliations: Thunderbolts; Alpha Flight
- Notable aliases: Persuasion; Purple Girl
- Abilities: Mind control via pheromone manipulation; Ability to merge her mind with others

Kara Killgrave is a mutant superhero appearing in American comic books published by Marvel Comics. Created by writer Bill Mantlo and artist David Ross, the character first appeared in Alpha Flight #41 (December 1986). Killgrave is the daughter of the supervillain Zebediah Killgrave / Purple Man. She is known under the codenames Purple Girl and Persuasion. She has also been a member of the Alpha Flight and the Thunderbolts at various points in her history.

== Publication history ==
Kara Killgrave debuted in Alpha Flight #41 (December 1986), and was created by Bill Mantlo and David Ross. She appeared in the 2019 Jessica Jones: Purple Daughter series, and the 2022 Thunderbolts series.

== Fictional character biography ==
Kara Killgrave is the daughter of Zebediah Killgrave / Purple Man and Melanie, a woman he forced into marrying him before genuinely falling in love with her. As a teenager, her abilities manifest and her skin turns purple, leading her to run away from home. Afterwards, Killgrave comes into conflict with Alpha Flight before joining them after they rescue her from the Auctioneer.

Killgrave becomes a valued member of Alpha Flight and Beta Flight and battles alongside them against such foes as the Dreamqueen, the Great Beasts, the Derangers, Scramble, China Force, and what she believed to be her father's reanimated corpse. After being injured in battle with China Force and abandoned by Alpha Flight, she decides to quit the team.

Following the disbanding of Department H, Killgrave is imprisoned in Neverland, a mutant concentration camp created by Weapon X under Malcolm Colcord. She is one of the few mutants who retain their powers after M-Day.

During the Fear Itself storyline, Killgrave works with the anti-government Citadel to steal a server that would reveal the truth about the Unity Party. However, the Unity Party kidnaps her and brainwashes her into joining Alpha Strike before Alpha Flight frees her.

Killgrave later resurfaces in New York City, during which Jessica Jones attacks her while searching for the Purple Man before working with her to stop him and his children.

Seeking redemption, Killgrave joins the new Thunderbolts team led by Luke Cage and Hawkeye, using the name Persuasion.

== Powers and abilities ==
Kara Killgrave emits a pheromone from her skin that allows her to control individuals within proximity through verbal commands, sometimes affecting hundreds of people simultaneously. Controlled subjects sometimes take on a purple hue. Her powers evolved to include limited telepathic abilities, such as sensing emotions and creating mental links between individuals. Despite her formidable influence, her control has limitations—she cannot affect involuntary bodily functions and her victims can be freed by exposure to water, though side effects like migraines may occur.

== Other versions ==
An alternate universe version of Kara Killgrave from Earth-295 appears in Age of Apocalypse.
