= Major Mapleleaf =

Major Mapleleaf is the name of two superheroes appearing in American comic books published by Marvel Comics, primarily in the series Alpha Flight. Both characters were created by writer Scott Lobdell.

== Major Mapleleaf (Louis Sadler) ==
Major Mapleleaf

Publication information
- Publisher: Marvel Comics
- First appearance: Alpha Flight #106 (March 1992)
- Created by: Scott Lobdell; Mark Pacella

In-story information
- Alter ego: Louis Sadler
- Species: Human mutate
- Team affiliations: Invaders

Louis Sadler is the name of the first Major Mapleleaf. He first appeared in Alpha Flight #106.

=== Fictional character biography ===
Louis Sadler is a Canadian superhero during World War II and an occasional ally of the Invaders who gained superhuman strength, durability, and longevity through an unrevealed process. After the war, Sadler goes underground with his crime-fighting and eventually reveals his public identity in 1963 so that he can devote time to raising his son Michael. After Michael dies from AIDS, Sadler sinks into a depression. Later, when the news is making a cause celebre out of a baby with HIV, Sadler goes on a rampage, believing society did not care about Michael due to him being gay. He is stopped by Northstar of Alpha Flight.

== Major Mapleleaf (Lou Sadler Jr.) ==
Major Mapleleaf
- Major Mapleleaf and Thunder as depicted in Alpha Flight (vol. 3) #5 (September 2004). Art by Clayton Henry.

Publication information
- Publisher: Marvel Comics
- First appearance: Alpha Flight (vol. 3) #1 (May 2004)
- Created by: Scott Lobdell; Clayton Henry

In-story information
- Alter ego: Louis "Lou" Sadler Jr.
- Team affiliations: Alpha Flight

Louis Sadler Jr., the younger son of the original Major Mapleleaf, assumes the mantle of Major Mapleleaf. Lou first appears in Alpha Flight vol. 3 #1.

=== Fictional character biography ===
Louis "Lou" Sadler Jr. is a normal human with no superpowers who rides a super-powered horse named Thunder.

Bearing the rank of staff sergeant in the Royal Canadian Mounted Police, Sadler takes the codename Major Mapleleaf to honor his father. Sasquatch later recruits Sadler into Alpha Flight after aliens kidnap the original team. In New Avengers, Michael Pointer kills Major Mapleleaf and the majority of Alpha Flight, with Sasquatch being the only survivor.

=== Powers and abilities ===
Major Mapleleaf has no superhuman powers, but is a skilled combatant and acrobat. His horse, Thunder, possesses flight, superhuman durability, and a degree of enhanced strength.
