= Guardian (Marvel Comics) =

Fictional superhero appearing in American comic books published by Marvel Comics

- Guardian as depicted in Alpha Flight #89 (October 1990). Art by Jim Lee.

Publication information
- Publisher: Marvel Comics
- First appearance: The Uncanny X-Men #109 (February 1978)
- Created by: John Byrne

In-story information
- Alter ego: James MacDonald Hudson
- Species: Human cyborg
- Place of origin: London, Ontario, Canada (Earth-616)
- Team affiliations: Alpha Flight; Beta Flight; Department H; Royal Canadian Mounted Police; J.A.N.U.S.
- Partnerships: Vindicator
- Notable aliases: Weapon Alpha, Vindicator, Jamie, Jimmy, Mac, Jimmy Hudson, Dr. Hudson, Antiguard, Major Maple-Leaf
- Abilities: Genius-level intellect; Proficient scientist and engineer; Skilled hand-to-hand combatant, martial artist, strategist and inventor; Physical attributes enhanced to peak of human potential; Superhuman strength and durability; Flight; Personal force field; Ability to fire energy blasts

Guardian (James Hudson; also known as Weapon Alpha or Vindicator) is a fictional superhero appearing in American comic books published by Marvel Comics. Created by John Byrne, the character made his first appearance in The Uncanny X-Men #109 (February 1978) which was co-plotted by Byrne and his long-time collaborator Chris Claremont.

The character is a founding member and leader of Alpha Flight. He was designed to be the Canadian equivalent of Captain America, hence his costume markings are modeled after the Canadian flag. Guardian is often confused with Captain Canuck, another Canadian-themed superhero with similar costume and superpowers.

As Vindicator, the character appears in X-Men: The Animated Series, voiced by Barry Flatman.

== Concept and creation ==
Guardian was a fan character, created by John Byrne years before he did any professional work in comics.

He was originally called "the Canadian Shield", after the rock formation, but when Byrne introduced the character in X-Men, this name was rejected by publisher Marvel Comics because of their prominent fictional organization named S.H.I.E.L.D. Byrne then suggested "Guardian", but this was also rejected due to the numerous extant Marvel characters under that name, so X-Men scripter Chris Claremont came up with Weapon Alpha and later Vindicator. These names were used for the character's initial appearances in The Uncanny X-Men #109, 120–121, and 139–140. Byrne disliked both these names, and when he was assigned the writing and penciling of the newly launched Alpha Flight comic, he quickly had "Vindicator" change names to his earlier suggestion, "Guardian".

== Fictional character biography ==
James MacDonald Hudson was born in London, Ontario, Canada. He is a leading petrochemical engineer and scientist for the Am-Can Corporation developing a powered exoskeleton suit. When he learns that his work will be used for American military purposes, Hudson raids his workplace, steals the prototype suit, and destroys the plans.

Hudson's girlfriend, Heather MacNeil, uses political connections in the Canadian government to persuade Am-Can to waive the charges against him. As a result, Department H is formed, a secret branch of the Canadian Department of National Defence, and Hudson is named as head of operations. Inspired by the debut of the Fantastic Four, Hudson plans to create a superhero team for Canada. He starts out with a prototype superhero team called the Flight, which has Wolverine as one of its members.

Following his prototype team the Flight, Hudson forms Alpha Flight as a superhero team for the Canadian government and develops his exoskeleton into a battle suit. As Weapon Alpha, Hudson unsuccessfully attempts to capture Wolverine, who had left Canada and joined the X-Men.

With the cancellation of Department H and its funding, Alpha Flight is temporarily disbanded. Hudson laments this for a time, but then is called to action by the arrival of the Great Beast Tundra. He sets out alone, but Heather takes it upon herself to summon the rest of Alpha Flight, plus two recently "gold-striped" members. The team defeats Tundra and decides to reform, albeit without direct government support.

Hudson is offered a plum job with the corporation Roxxon in New York City, which turns out to be a ruse. Hudson is trapped and set upon by an evil incarnation of Omega Flight and his old boss from Am-Can, Jerry Jaxon. The battle is joined by the rest of Alpha Flight. During the battle, Hudson is seemingly killed when his battle suit explodes due to the strain of energizing a multiple teleportation matrix system. He is transported to Ganymede, where he encounters the alien Quwrlln. The Quwrlln integrate Hudson's battle suit into his body, fusing it to his biological and nervous systems. Hudson returns to Earth and takes the name Vindicator, leaving the title of Guardian and position of leadership with Heather.

While again working for Department H, Hudson becomes caught up in the plans of its new director, General Jeremy Clarke. Scientists working for Clarke clone Hudson, steal his memories, and attempt to shoot his body into outer space. The clone meets up with the members of Alpha Flight, while the original Hudson is found by Sasquatch in Antarctica. After his return, he once again becomes team leader while the clone becomes leader of Beta Flight. Hudson and his clone are later captured by A.I.M., with the clone being killed in the escape.

Alpha Flight is attacked by the Collective, who kills Guardian, Vindicator, Shaman, and Puck. During the Chaos War storyline, Guardian, Vindicator, Shaman, and Marrina Smallwood are resurrected after Death leaves the underworld, enabling them to escape.

During the Krakoan Age, Henry Peter Gyrich manipulates Guardian into joining Orchis, an anti-mutant terrorist group. He soon decides to leave the group after reconsidering Gyrich's extreme methods.

== Powers and abilities ==
Formerly, Guardian used a skin-tight technological "battle suit" composed of steel mesh which served as an exoskeleton; it allowed him to fly, fire energy blasts and had a personal force field for defence. The suit design stems from a geological/oil-exploration exo-suit designed by Hudson during his early career. The original suit possessed an energy beam weapon system, ostensibly used for drilling/tunneling. The skin-tight suit is considered to be a later, possibly 2nd or 3rd generation, evolution of the original design. The battle suit is cybernetically controlled and contains a high resolution navigation system. The battle suit permits flight by directing beams of force towards the ground, propelling the wearer forward at up to Mach 1.

Guardian could cause the battle suit computers to trigger and release gravitons, canceling the Earth's rotation relative to himself, propelling himself westward at up to about 1000 miles per hour (at the equator). This effect would suspend his positioning relative to the Earth's electromagnetic field while the planet rotated, allowing him to travel at high speed depending on his latitude positioning.

When he returned from space, the technology of the suit that formerly existed as a separate part of him was incorporated into his body. The alien Quwrlln converted James Hudson into a cyborg incorporating much of his battle suit; some of his mechanical parts were visible on the surface of his body. As a result, his powers were greatly enhanced. Hudson's cyborg brain was half-organic (portions of his original brain) and half-mechanical. Hudson could control his mechanical systems by mental command, though he was vulnerable to being controlled by the Quwrlln through the mechanical portion of his brain. With great effort the human portion of his brain could override this control.

Guardian's power suit allows for:

- Increased strength and durability;
- Cybernetic link-up and hacking abilities;
- Advanced weapons systems, including (but not limited to) electromagnetic pulse projectors, beams of concussive energy from the gauntlets, bolts of plasma, ultrasonic beams, and a graviton beam;
- Increased intelligence due to the fusion of his battle suit to his neural network;
- Increased speed, reaching Mach 1;
- Ability to create and travel through a wormhole.
- The creation of a protective force field that dampens inertia and absorbs energy;
- Force shields that also deflect outside pressure, such as in the ocean depths;

Hudson holds a Ph.D. in engineering and is an inventor. He is trained in hand-to-hand combat and has experience as a battle strategist and leader.

== Other characters named Guardian ==
Several unrelated characters have called themselves Guardian:

- Markus Ettlinger is a German soldier who has been referred to as Guardian and its German translation, Vormund.
- Guardian is a robot who was used by MODOK to fight Iron Man.
- Michael Pointer once used the codename of Guardian.

Guardian is the name of one of the Imperial guards of the Shi'ar Empire.

== Other versions ==
=== Marvel Zombies ===
A zombified alternate universe version of James Hudson / Guardian appears in Marvel Zombies.

=== Ultimate Marvel ===
An alternate universe version of James Hudson appears in the Ultimate Marvel imprint. This version is a Gulf War veteran, sheriff in Port St. Lucie, Florida, and acquaintance of Wolverine. Wolverine entrusts Hudson with raising his son, who Hudson names James Hudson Jr.

==== Derek Morgan ====
Derek Morgan was a mutant who can assume an avian form with prehensile wings, sharp talons, enhanced sight, super-strength, enhanced durability, and a healing factor.

== In other media ==
=== Television ===
James Hudson / Vindicator appears in the X-Men: The Animated Series episode "Repo Man", voiced by Barry Flatman.

=== Film ===
A loose depiction, Travis Hudson, appears in X-Men Origins: Wolverine, portrayed by Max Cullen. This version is an elderly man who is married to Heather Hudson and is later killed by Agent Zero.

=== Video games ===
- Guardian appears as a non-player character (NPC) in X-Men Legends II: Rise of Apocalypse, voiced by Jim Ward.
- Guardian appears as a playable character in Marvel Super Hero Squad Online.
- Guardian appears as a playable character in Marvel Contest of Champions.

=== Merchandise ===
- In 2008, Hasbro released an action figure of Guardian in its Walmart-exclusive Marvel Legends line.
- In 2019, Hasbro released another Marvel Legends figure of Guardian alongside the Wendigo.
