= Utopia (comics) =

Marvel Comics storyline

- Cover of Dark Avengers/Uncanny X-Men: Utopia 1 (Aug 2009), art by Marc Silvestri
- Publisher: Marvel Comics
- Publication date: June – September 2009
- Genre: Superhero; Crossover
Title(s)
Dark Avengers #7-8
Dark Avengers/Uncanny X-Men: Exodus #1
Dark Avengers/Uncanny X-Men: Utopia #1
Dark X-Men: The Beginning #1-3
Dark X-Men: The Confession #1
The Uncanny X-Men #513-514
X-Men: Legacy #226-227
- Main character(s): Iron Patriot; Cyclops; Emma Frost; Namor; Dark Avengers; X-Men; Dark X-Men

Creative team
- Writer(s): Matt Fraction (Dark Avengers, The Uncanny X-Men); James Asmus (Dark X-Men: The Beginning); Mike Carey (X-Men Legacy); Paul Cornell (Dark X-Men: The Beginning)
- Hardcover: ISBN 0-7851-4233-9

"Utopia" is a 2009 comic book crossover story arc written by Matt Fraction and published by Marvel Comics, starring the X-Men and the Dark Avengers. The first issue was released in June 2009. The story's aftermath leads into the "Nation X."

After a mutant riot and an anti-mutant riot in San Francisco, Norman Osborn tries to enforce peace by creating his own team of Dark X-Men to serve in much the same way the Dark Avengers did, using these teams to bring down the real X-Men.

== Publication history ==
The core storyline runs through the Dark Avengers and Uncanny X-Men titles, starting and ending with bookend one-shots titled Utopia and Exodus, respectively, and is written by Matt Fraction with Brian Michael Bendis consulting. The read order for the main story is:

- Chapter 1: Dark Avengers/Uncanny X-Men: Utopia #1 (one-shot)
- Chapter 2: Uncanny X-Men #513
- Chapter 3: Dark Avengers #7
- Chapter 4: Uncanny X-Men #514
- Chapter 5: Dark Avengers #8
- Chapter 6: Dark Avengers/Uncanny X-Men: Exodus #1 (one-shot)
- Epilogue: Dark X-Men: The Confession #1 (one-shot)
- Aftermath: Dark Reign: The List - X-Men #1 (one-shot)

A three-issue anthology limited series titled Dark X-Men: The Beginning was similar in style to limited series X-Men: Divided We Stand and X-Men: Manifest Destiny, which were written by Paul Cornell and James Asmus. Some of the stories describe the reasons for the members of the Dark X-Men joining the team.

Another set of stories are X-Men: Legacy #226-227, written by Mike Carey, which describes the battle between the X-Men and Dark Avengers from the outsider's point of view, in particular Rogue and Gambit. This begins a new direction for the series that began in X-Men: Legacy Annual.

The main storyline leads into Dark Reign: The List - Uncanny X-Men, also written by Fraction, which then leads into the next Uncanny X-Men arc. The Dark X-Men: The Confession one-shot is written by Christopher Yost and Craig Kyle of X-Force. The second arc of the New Mutants volume dealt with the outcome of Utopia on that team.

== Build-up ==
After the events of the "Messiah Complex" storyline, Cyclops ordered Wolverine to form a new X-Force team to act as his own covert black-ops squad, something Cyclops himself revealed to no one outside the team, in particular the co-leader of the X-Men and his lover, Emma Frost. Also, in the Secret Invasion: Dark Reign one-shot, at the first meeting of the Cabal, Osborn promised Frost to leave the San Francisco mutant community alone, provided she kept them under control. Emma kept the fact that she belonged to the Cabal from Cyclops. These secrets almost caused a split in their relationship, but they eventually reveal the truth to each other, promising to keep no more secrets.

Another event of note happened at the start of Messiah Complex, when at the place of birth of the new mutant child in Cooperstown, Alaska, a battle took place between the Marauders and the Purifiers, in which the town was razed. After that, Simon Trask, the brother of Sentinel creator Bolivar Trask, calls for legislating mutant reproductive rights. Trask's influence resulted in many states supporting the anti-mutant legislation, which in turn caused turmoil in the mutant community.

== Synopsis ==
=== Chapter I ===
The tension comes to a head when Trask's anti-mutant group, Humanity Now, marches through San Francisco. On the way to City Hall, they are stopped by members of the X-Men. Riots ensue. Eventually, the police intercede and Hank McCoy is taken into custody. As X-Men try to quell the fighting across San Francisco, Osborn shows up to hold an impromptu press conference. He calls for a stop to the rioting, with Professor X at his side. Both ask for Scott Summers to turn himself in and relinquish his leadership role within the mutant community, but he refuses. Osborn releases the Dark Avengers into the city, who hunt down X-Men. At the jail, Beast begins to hear voices in his head, and it is revealed that the real Charles Xavier is a few cells over, bleeding and injured, claiming that Osborn has done something to him that is impeding his powers.

==== Meanwhile in X-Men: Legacy ====
During Utopia, Rogue, Gambit and Danger go to San Francisco to regroup with the other X-Men. They are intercepted en route by Pixie, who teleports them into the city, which is in a state of chaos due to the riots. Cyclops sends all three out to bring home several missing students. During their mission, Rogue faces off against the new Ms. Marvel.

Later on, she joins Gambit, who has been injured by Ares, along with Danger. Ares does not take her seriously and dismisses her both as an opponent and her attempts to calm things down. Rogue grabs Ares and absorbs some of his powers. She easily dispatches a small group of H.A.M.M.E.R. agents with superhuman strength and proceeds to steal their tank, along with Gambit and Danger.

Rogue finally locates Trance and calms her down. Together, they defeat Ms. Marvel.

=== Chapter II ===
Osborn creates his official X-Men team with Frost as the leader. The team is joined by Namor at Frost's request. Frost confirms that Osborn has a shapeshifter posing as Xavier. Osborn confirms that Mystique is working for him. Frost holds a public meeting introducing the H.A.M.M.E.R.-sanctioned team (Dark X-Men). They impose a curfew, which is shut down by a group of mutants led by Hellion, who are attacked by the Dark X-Men. Meanwhile, Dark Beast sets up a machine to experiment on mutants in Alcatraz for H.A.M.M.E.R. and starts testing on Beast.

=== Chapter III ===
The "Omega Machine" that Dark Beast is using on Hank McCoy is slowly eating him away, causing him great pain and torment. In another cell, Xavier tries to console McCoy and give him words of hope. Meanwhile, Osborn is not impressed with the Omega Machine's test results and wants Dark Beast to make sure the machine works in removing powers from mutants, without killing them. Elsewhere, Frost and the Dark X-Men are finishing up quelling the riots and capture the team led by Hellion. During the skirmish, Daken almost kills Avalanche, but Frost stops him in time, reminding him to avoid force. Cyclops secretly meets with Osborn and demands he leave San Francisco. Osborn is furious with this demand and threatens to kill Cyclops. The Dark X-Men return to their base where Frost (still upset over Daken's actions) demands that Osborn and Dark Beast show her around the facility to verify that all the captured mutants are treated fairly. While she examines the facility, Xavier speaks to her telepathically unbeknownst to Osborn and Dark Beast. Emma tries to find Xavier, but his cell is rigged with a hologram that shows an empty storage cell. Back in San Francisco, Simon Trask gathers a group of Human Sentinels who are ready to destroy all mutants.

=== Chapter IV ===
Frost's team is called out to deal with the Bio-Sentinels attacking San Francisco. Emma discovers that whatever Trask has infected his people with has killed them. Danielle Moonstar goes to Las Vegas in the hope of approaching someone with a deal. Osborn then sends Frost's team to St. Francis Hospital to deal with Simon Trask. Magik meets up with X-Force to retrieve the imprisoned mutants while Psylocke, Kavita Rao, Madison Jeffries, and Doctor Nemesis are just off the Pacific coast, reactivating a ship.

=== Chapter V ===
It is revealed that Dani Moonstar went to Vegas to make a deal with Hela, asking for a new ride home and a big sword, implying that she wishes to regain her Valkyrie powers. Emma's team successfully disables the Bio-Sentinels and takes down Trask. The Dark X-Men and watch the Omega Machine in action. Meanwhile, Madison Jeffries and Psylocke have finished the final installations to the ship. Back at Alcatraz, Hank McCoy looks even weaker. Dark Beast goes to look for more subjects, but finds that Magik and X-Force have teleported them out, as Mindee had warned him. X-Force faces off against Weapon Omega and Dark Beast. Cyclops has Nightcrawler and Pixie gather all their forces in the chapel and Magik and Pixie teleport them all away, group by group, saying it's "time to go home". The Dark X-Men face off against X-Force, with Frost and Namor revealing themselves as still on the good guy's team by taking out Daken and Mimic. Cloak and Dagger flee with Namor, Frost and X-Force after Magik evacuates all the prisoners. The remaining Dark X-Men head back to talk to Osborn. The "ship" the X-Club has reactivated rises up out of the water and is revealed to be an island built onto Asteroid M. Several mutants gather around Cyclops as he declares, via a televised speech, that the island is outside of Osborn and H.A.M.M.E.R.'s jurisdiction. Cyclops further declares the X-Men's stand against Osborn. Osborn then gathers the Dark Avengers and the remaining Dark X-Men, ordering them to bring him Namor's head and Frost's heart and that Summers see them do it.

=== Chapter VI ===
7 days before: McCoy walks in on Summers and Frost in bed. He tells them he will be leaving with the X-Club and will be gone for some time, but when he gets back, he wants a long conversation. Frost jokes about him leaving, but Summers is distraught. Frost attempts to console him, but he feels that he cannot accept her until they talk.

Now: Cyclops and the rest of the X-Men prepare for the Dark Avengers and Dark X-Men's assault on Utopia. The Dark X-Men attack. Warren takes Bullseye out of the equation. Bling, Nekra and Frenzy attack Ms. Marvel. Colossus goes after Venom. Wolverine and X-23 go after Weapon Omega and Daken. The X-Club go after Dark Beast in retribution for their Beast. Namor takes on Sentry, but is defeated. Iron Patriot and Cyclops battle. Moonstar, now empowered by Hela, battles Ares. Iceman fights Mimic. Frost goes to Xavier to help her to get inside Sentry's head to calm him down. They succeed, but Frost must remain in her diamond state as part of the Void is now inside her. After realizing what he has done, the Sentry leaves the battlefield. Moonstar, aided by her New Mutants teammates, defeats Ares. Weapon Omega falls to Wolverine. Daken is taken down by Armor, Pixie, and X-23. Mimic is overpowered by the sheer amount of powers. Osborn stands over Cyclops, beaten. Ms. Marvel informs him that they would have to kill them all in order to win this. Osborn tells her to go ahead, but then realizes the sheer number of mutants as Pixie puts it, all of them X-Men, and in front of the camera. The Dark X-Men retreat. Cyclops goes on TV to inform the world of Utopia, a place where mutants will be safe from harm and from persecution. Osborn also holds a press conference in which he presents himself, his Avengers and his X-Men as the victorious side that managed to drive the mutants away. Osborn also declares the war against the mutants to be over and that Utopia is now their prison.

The X-Men start to rebuild Utopia to make it a safe haven. Frost wonders if the end result will be like Genosha. Cyclops says no.

=== Post Utopia ===
The aftermath of Utopia followed in the Deadpool and New Avengers books:

After deciding to help people, Deadpool makes his way to San Francisco to start a new life. Dressing to 'fit in' (Deadpool wears a set of flamboyantly pink shorts and shirt), Wade is nearly provoked into killing a group of a hecklers, until two teens tell him that no matter what, he's beautiful. Content by the compliment, Wade lets the hecklers live and heads to a local bar where he beats up (and possibly kills) a group of sailors and the bartender. Again feeling dejected, Wade watches Cyclops address the world about Utopia. Seeing Cyclops urging all mutants to join them, Deadpool concludes that Cyclops is speaking to him specifically and decides to join the X-Men.

Meanwhile, in New York, the New Avengers watch the news in which Osborn has labeled the X-Men and all mutants on Utopia as traitors and designates Utopia a prison colony. Ronin, upon hearing this, becomes furious. Mockingbird and Ms. Marvel suggest that the team go to Utopia and help their friends, but Ronin disagrees and urges the other New Avengers to join him in killing Norman Osborn.

== Reading order ==
The following is based on the release dates of the issues.

=== June 2009 ===
- Dark Avengers/Uncanny X-Men: Utopia

=== July 2009 ===
- The Uncanny X-Men #513
- Dark X-Men: The Beginning #1
- X-Men Legacy #226
- Dark Avengers #7
- Dark X-Men: The Beginning #2

=== August 2009 ===
- The Uncanny X-Men #514
- X-Men Legacy #227
- Dark Avengers #8
- Dark X-Men: The Beginning #3

=== September 2009 ===
- Dark Avengers/Uncanny X-Men: Exodus
- Dark X-Men: Confession #1
- Dark Reign: The List-Uncanny X-Men

== Collected editions ==
=== Softcovers ===
Title	Material collected	Publication date	ISBN
Dark Avengers/Uncanny X-Men: Utopia	Uncanny X-Men #513–514; Dark Avengers #7–8; Dark Avengers/Uncanny X-Men: Utopia; Utopia Finale	April 2010	0-7851-4234-7

=== Hardcovers ===
Title	Material collected	Date Released	ISBN
Dark Avengers/Uncanny X-Men: Utopia	Dark Avengers/Uncanny X-Men: Utopia, Dark Avengers/Uncanny X-Men: Exodus, Uncanny X-Men #513-514, Dark Avengers #7-8, Dark X-Men: The Beginning #1-3, X-Men Legacy #226-227 and Dark X-Men: The Confession	November 2009	ISBN 0-7851-4233-9
Uncanny X-Men: The Complete Collection by Matt Fraction Vol. 2	Uncanny X-Men #512–519, Dark Avengers/Uncanny X-Men: Utopia, Dark Avengers/Uncanny X-Men: Exodus, Dark Avengers #7-8, Dark Reign: The List - X-Men, material from Dark Reign: The Cabal	April 2013	0-7851-6594-0
Dark X-Men: The Beginning	Dark X-Men: The Beginning #1-3, and X-Men Legacy #226-227	Cancelled before publication	ISBN 0-7851-4230-4
