= Threnody (character) =

- Cover to X-Man #13 featuring X-Man and Threnody

Publication information
- Publisher: Marvel Comics
- First appearance: X-Men vol. 2 #27 (December, 1993)
- Created by: Fabian Nicieza (writer); Richard Bennett (artist)

In-story information
- Alter ego: Melody Jacobs
- Species: Human Mutant
- Team affiliations: Assassins Guild; Marauders
- Abilities: Ability to sense the dead or dying and absorb the necro-energy, then use that to release a concussive blast or Zombie creation.

Threnody is a supervillain appearing in American comic books published by Marvel Comics. Created by Fabian Nicieza and Richard Bennett, Threnody first appeared in X-Men (vol. 2) #27 (October 1993), but was previously shown in Stryfe's Strike File #1 (November 1992). Melody Jacobs is a mutant with the ability to sense and absorb death energy. She is sustained by these energies and becomes addicted to them.

She was an ally to X-Man, but later became a supervillain due to her need for death energies.

== Fictional character biography ==
Melody Jacobs was born in Manhattan and led a normal life until her mutant powers manifested in adolescence. She found herself feeding off of the energies released by the dead and the dying, with residual slivers of the dead's souls lingering and damaging her psyche. Melody became a runaway, before being found by Abomination (Emil Blonsky), who had established himself as the lord of a clan of homeless and runaways known as the Forgotten, who took refuge in the sewers under the city. Melody spent weeks lying in a fugue-like state in Blonsky's lair, cared for by the Forgotten. She was named "Threnody" after the mournful cries she made in between her brief periods of lucidity.

Over time, Threnody builds up power which is violently released as a "death-purge", killing her caretakers. Threnody flees and lives on the streets of Los Angeles. She later meets Gordon Lefferts, a geneticist in the employ of Mister Sinister and the first mutant exposed to the Legacy Virus. Lefferts identifies the virus within him and begins studying it for a possible cause and cure, while Threnody and other homeless take residence in his lab. Sinister sees that Threnody has potential to track infected mutants and takes her under his care with Beast's permission.

Threnody quickly improves under the care of Mister Sinister, who designs small neuro-locks that prevent her stored energy from being releasing unintentionally. Threnody in turn is used as a tracking system with Legacy Virus-afflicted mutants while working as Sinister's assistant. Threnody escapes to Paris, but is pursued by Sinister's Marauders. She is rescued by Nate Grey (X-Man). Nate accidentally disrupts Threnody's neuro-locks, causing a massive explosion that he contains with his telekinesis.

Threnody travels to Greece with Nate, where they battle the villain Holocaust. During the battle, Threnody discovers that she is able to absorb the energy of the dying, killing them in a non-violent manner. Once she and Nate return to New York, Threnody separates from him without explaining her motivations. She is once again pursued by the Marauders, but is saved by Abomination. He blames her for the deaths of the Forgotten years prior. Nate experiences Abomination's memories of the incident, but forgives Threnody for her actions. The two leave the tunnels and Threnody finally puts her past with the Forgotten behind.

Threnody and Nate begin living together in a SoHo loft. Nate develops a following as a street psychic in Washington Square Park, earning them some spending money. However, Threnody's powers evolve to the extent that she no longer requires normal sustenance, surviving only on the death energy she absorbs. Eventually, Nate pushes her away and she returns to the streets. Threnody is attacked by Madelyne Pryor, who sucks her of her energy.

Threnody is left for dead in St. Raymond's Cemetery and taken to a morgue. She consumes the death energy inside the morgue, restoring her to life. Threnody's powers evolve further, causing her to resurrect nearby corpses as zombie-like beings. Seeking to feed, Threnody stumbles into the Last Lair after the psychotic Jackknife massacred the entire gang and feeds on the lingering death energy. She remains in the Morlock tunnels until she discovers Dark Beast's labs nearby. Threnody chooses to relocate before Dark Beast can find her.

Threnody and her undead followers haunt the apartment where she and Nate Grey had lived until Nate unexpectedly appears after several months away. Threnody is angered to see Nate is traveling with Madelyne Pryor, the woman who killed her. Threnody's stomach is now noticeably distended making it appear as if she was several months pregnant. She tracks Nate via his unique death energy for a time, first to Alaska and then to Seattle where he collapses in an alley after a battle. She takes him to her refuge under the Seattle piers. While Nate lays unconscious for a week, Threnody is sustained by her zombie followers. Nate awakes to see the zombies clawing at Threnody, who is in a state of delusion or intense pain. When Nate pulls her free, she appears to no longer be pregnant. After parting ways with Nate, Threnody retrieves a bundle from her refuge which contains a newborn child. The secrets of this child and its parentage along with the true nature of Threnody's pregnancy are not revealed.

Threnody, the Harkspur Brood and Blackout are seen as recruits to the Assassins Guild and are requested by its leader Belladona Boudreaux to deal with Deadpool. Threnody reveals that she only joined the Assassins Guild to collect the energy necessary to feed her child. Threnody's child was affected by her powers and born an undead demonic creature which needs to be regularly nourished with her death energy.

== Powers and abilities ==
Threnody is capable of sensing the certain necroplasmic energies that surround a person when they are near death or dying. She then absorbs this energy and uses it to generate concussive blasts of energy. When Threnody was murdered, she fed off her own death energy, which resurrected her. This experience of being so close to death enhanced her powers, allowing Threnody to now also be able to bring back the dead as mindless zombies who follow her every command. The zombies that Threnody creates are completely loyal to her and appear to have super strength and can still fight for their "queen" even when their limbs are torn from their bodies. Threnody has often been depicted as being enraptured by the scent of death and the "taste" of the energy, sometimes to the point of it being an addiction.

== Reception ==
Comic Book Resources included Threnody in "Black X-Men Characters That We Need to See in the MCU".
