= X-Men: Nation X =

Marvel Comics storyline

"Nation X"
- Cover of The Uncanny X-Men 515 (Nov 2009), art by Greg Land
- Publisher: Marvel Comics
- Publication date: September 2009 – March 2010
- Genre: Superhero; Crossover
- Title(s): Uncanny X-Men #515–522; Nation X #1–4; X-Men: Legacy #228–230 annual
- Main character: X-Men

Creative team
- Writer(s): Matt Fraction; Simon Spurrier; James Asmus; Chris Yost; Scott Snyder; Grace Randolph
- Artist(s): Leonard Kirk; Mike Allred; Terry Dodson; Greg Land; Whilce Portacio
- Uncanny X-Men: Nation X: ISBN 0-7851-3873-0

"Nation X" (also known as "X-Men: Nation X") is a 2009–2010 crossover storyline published by Marvel Comics featuring the X-Men. Published in the aftermath of the "Utopia" storyline and dealing with the return of Magneto, the story appeared across several different books, including Uncanny X-Men #515–522, Nation X #1–4 and X-Men: Legacy #228–230. Its writers include James Asmus, Matt Fraction, Grace Randolph, Scott Snyder, Simon Spurrier, and Christopher Yost, and its artists include Leonard Kirk, Mike Allred, Terry Dodson, Greg Land and Whilce Portacio.

== Premise ==
The storyline dealt with the aftermath of the "Utopia" storyline and the return of Magneto. Along with the main run in Uncanny X-Men, a four-issue anthology series title Nation X was released along with Nation X: X-Factor one-shot. Additionally, the Deadpool arc "Want You to Want Me" acts as an unofficial tie-in to the main storyline.

== Plot synopsis ==
=== Uncanny X-Men ===
Shortly after the funeral of Dr. Yuriko Takiguchi on Utopia (previously known as the first Asteroid M), Magneto confronts the new inhabitants of his former home. Magneto stuns everyone by telling them he has come in peace and wishes to speak with Cyclops.

Professor Xavier is unconvinced, believing the entire ruse to be a trap and attacks him telepathically. In spite of this, Magneto does not fight back. Instead, he gets down on his knees and repeats his peaceful intentions. Cyclops orders Xavier to stand down and agrees to talk with Magneto, but keeps Psylocke close by in case Xavier is right. Magneto explains how he and the High Evolutionary restored his powers and his intention to use the process to reverse the Decimation effect. Since the High Evolutionary's equipment was destroyed in the process of repowering Magneto, this is now impossible. He also reveals that he has been in space since then trying to find another way of saving mutantkind, but to no avail. Magneto expresses his admiration to Cyclops for finally doing what he and Xavier could not: uniting mutantkind together. Magneto fears that mutantkind is doomed until Cyclops tells him that Hope Summers, the Mutant Messiah, is alive and well. Meanwhile, Scalphunter was recently kidnapped by a group of non-mutant superhumans. They proclaim to want to save all of mutantkind, but force him to fly a plane (which secretly contains five mutant-eating creatures) towards Utopia. Nightcrawler is sent to investigate Scalphunter's intentions as he approaches the island. Upon teleporting to the plane, he retreats to the surface screaming for Cyclops to shoot the plane down before it can land. Cyclops shoots at the plane.

When the five Predator Xs attack Utopia, the X-Men, Namor, and Magneto band together and kill them.

While Professor X helps Cyclops extract the Void from Emma Frost, Magneto helps the X-Men into keeping Utopia from sinking due to the extra weight from the other mutants.

After becoming disillusioned about Cyclops' judgement of having Magneto join up with them, Beast leaves the team.

The latest issue revealed that the villains who had previously kidnapped Scalphunter and released the Predator Xs against the X-Men - named as Lobe, Verre, Burst, Thug, and Bouncing Betty - were Sublime's associates, after they are defeated by Wolverine, Psylocke, Colossus and Fantomex. It also showed Magneto heading up to the top of Mount Tamalpais on a mission of his own, while the others at first question what he is doing, eventually X-Club discover that he is bringing back Kitty Pryde, who was last seen trapped inside a giant bullet hurling through space.

=== Nation X ===
The Nation X miniseries focuses on short and mostly trivial stories centered in one character or a small group during their settlement in Utopia. Although the stories do not have a direct relation of continuity among them, some of them indicate the greater problems in the island, such as lack of food and water.

Characters focused on the stories include Magneto, Wolverine, Nightcrawler, Iceman, Colossus, Northstar, Gambit, No-Girl, Armor, Danger, Magik, Anole, Madison Jeffries, Cannonball, Emma Frost, the Stepford Cuckoos, Warpath, Loa, Rockslide, Match, Namor, and Storm. Non-residents of Utopia were also featured in some stories, like Jubilee and Doop.

== Reading order ==
This is based on the release dates of the issues:

=== September 2009 ===
- Deadpool vol. 2 #15
- X-Men: Legacy Annual #1
- Uncanny X-Men #515

=== October 2009 ===
- Deadpool vol. 2 #16
- Uncanny X-Men #516
- X-Men: Legacy #228

=== November 2009 ===
- Deadpool vol. 2 #17
- X-Men: Legacy #229
- Uncanny X-Men #517

=== December 2009 ===
- Uncanny X-Men #518
- Nation X #1
- Deadpool #18
- X-Men: Legacy #230
- Uncanny X-Men #519

=== January 2010 ===
- Nation X: X-Factor #1
- Nation X #2
- Uncanny X-Men #520

=== February 2010 ===
- Uncanny X-Men #521
- Nation X #3

=== March 2010 ===
- Nation X #4
- Uncanny X-Men #522

== Bibliography ==
- Uncanny X-Men #515–522
- Nation X #1–4
- Nation X: X-Factor #1
- Deadpool vol. 2, #15–18
- X-Men: Legacy #228–230, Annual #1

=== Collected editions ===
The various titles are being collected into individual volumes:

- X-Men: Nation X (collects Uncanny X-Men #515–522, Dark Reign: The List – X-Men and Nation X 1–4, 344 pages, May 2010, ISBN 0-7851-3873-0)
- X-Men Legacy: Emplate (collects X-Men: Legacy #228–230, and Giant-Size X-Men: Legacy, 112 pages, premiere hardcover, March 2010, ISBN 0-7851-4020-4)
