= Matt Coyle =

Australian artist and graphic novelist

- Born: 1971 (age 54–55) Nantwich, United Kingdom
- Notable works: graphic novels: Registry of Death (1996) and Worry Doll (2007 & 2016)
- Collaborators: Peter Lamb
- www.mattcoyle.net

Matt Coyle (born 1971) is an Australian artist and graphic novelist living in Hobart, Tasmania.

Born in Nantwich, United Kingdom, Coyle has created two graphic novels, Registry of Death (1996), co-authored with Peter Lamb and published by Kitchen Sink Press, and Worry Doll (2007) which was originally published by Mam Tor Publishing and again in 2016 by Dover Publications.

Coyle's work has a hyper-reality to it which is achieved with fine-tip black Artline pens. An article in The Telegraph (UK) quotes him as saying; "I draw like this because I love the initial feel of realism, then the unease, or the uncanny feeling that it's not real. I am never bored with drawing like this. Lines are beautiful things, and it's a constant battle for perfection."

== Education ==
He studied painting at Sydney College of the Arts in 1988.

== Publications ==
His debut, Registry of Death, is set in a future in which 'undesirables' can be forcibly eliminated from 'Births, Deaths, and Marriages'—i.e.: killed. One 'Registry Elimination Officer' finds himself on the wrong side of his job—and a gruesome battle to the death is enacted.

His second graphic novel Worry Doll concerns a suitcase full of dolls who stumble across the murdered corpses of their host family, leading them to flee the crime scene and embark on a nightmarish road trip.

He has a third incomplete novel, called, The Trespasser.

== Exhibitions ==
Coyle exhibits regularly in Melbourne, Hobart and Sydney and has appeared in group shows internationally including The Hong Kong Art Fair, The Korean International Art Fair (KIAF)and Art Athina . His work is held in collections including the NGV, GOMA/ Queensland Art Gallery and Maitland Regional Art Gallery and has been commissioned to create drawings for Art and Australia and GQ Style.

== Bibliography ==
- Registry of Death (with co-author Peter Lamb, Kitchen Sink Press, 1996)
- Worry Doll (Mam Tor Publishing, February 2007)
