= Mam Tor Publishing =

English independent comic book publishing company

- Type: Independent Publisher
- Industry: Publishing
- Founded: 2004
- Founder: Liam Sharp (publisher); Christina McCormack
- Headquarters: Derby
- Key people: Liam Sharp (Editor-in-chief); Christina McCormack-Sharp; John Bamber; Tom Muller
- Products: Comics, Graphic Novels, Novels

Mam Tor Publishing is an English independent comic book publisher founded by Liam Sharp and his wife Christina McCormack. The company's headquarters are in Derby, East Midlands.

The name "Mam Tor" comes from the landmark high peak near Castleton in the High Peak of Derbyshire, England.

== History ==
During 2004, Mam Tor Publishing was established by Liam & Christina McCormack-Sharp to publish Sharpenings, The Art of Liam Sharp. It, a personal artbook featuring previously unreleased art samples of Sharp, was initially a portfolio showcase he could send publishers.

Mam Tor has published the anthology Mam Tor: Event Horizon.

Currently Mam Tor is releasing stand-alone graphic novels, like Matt Coyle's Worry Doll and Sharp's Lap Of The Gods, as well as developing other properties for comics, books, and film.

They have just started publishing a quarterly free comic given away in Time Out. Four Feet From a Rat is a 16-page comic comprising 4 stories, all written by the advertising company Mother, Stories in the first issue are "The Crane Gods" Liam Sharp, "The Little Guy" by Chris Weston, "Routemaster" by Dave Kendall and "Don Pigeone" by Kev Crossley. The third issue got press attention thanks to the story illustrated by Roger Langridge "Young Boris," which featured the adventures of London mayor Boris Johnson.

== Mam Tor: Event Horizon ==
The books mascot Viking Zombie Elvis, who opens and closes each book has made the leap from the printed page to (undead) life in the shlock mock rock doc "Paul Hammond's Rumours of Ragnorok? a Historiography"

== Publications ==
- Sharpenings: The Art of Liam Sharp
- Mam Tor: Event Horizon:
  - #1 (140 pages, May 2005, ISBN 0-9549998-0-0)
  - #2 (208 pages, November 2005, ISBN 0-9549998-1-9)
- Life Is Humiliation #1, #2
- Worry Doll — (graphic novel by Matt Coyle, January 2007, ISBN 0-9549998-3-5)
- Lap of the Gods — (collection of personal works by Liam Sharp)
- St. Cyborg's — (by Nick Wray, 168 pages, January 2008, ISBN 0-9549998-5-1)
- The Enemy's Son — Erth Chronicles Book I (by James Johnson, May 2008, ISBN 0-9549998-4-3)
- Four Feet From A Rat — (Quarterly comic supplement in Time Out London magazine, March 2008 - )
- God Killers – Machivarius Point & Other Stories - (Novel and short stories by Liam Sharp, May 2009, ISBN 978-0-9549998-6-5)

== Awards ==
- 2006:
  - Won Best Graphic Novel, Sci-Fi London, for Mam Tor: Event Horizon
- 2007:
  - Won Best Comic Book Artist, Rue Morgue Award, for Matt Coyle's Worry Doll
  - Nominated Best British Colour Comic, Eagle Awards, for Mam Tor: Event Horizon

== Creators ==
- Liam Sharp
- Steve Niles
- Ashley Wood
- Chris Weston
- Dan Wickline
- Kody Chamberlain
- Tom Muller
- Shane McCarthy
- Emma Simcock-Tooth
- Kev Crossley
- Gary Erskine
- Glenn Fabry
- Simon Bisley
- Emily Hare
- Dave Kendall
- Matt Dixon
- Greg Staples
- John Bamber
- Matt Boyce
- Alan Grant
- Brem
- Douglas Rushkoff
- Ali Powers
- Matt Coyle
- Nick Wray
