= Grace Randolph =

American YouTuber, host, and comic book writer

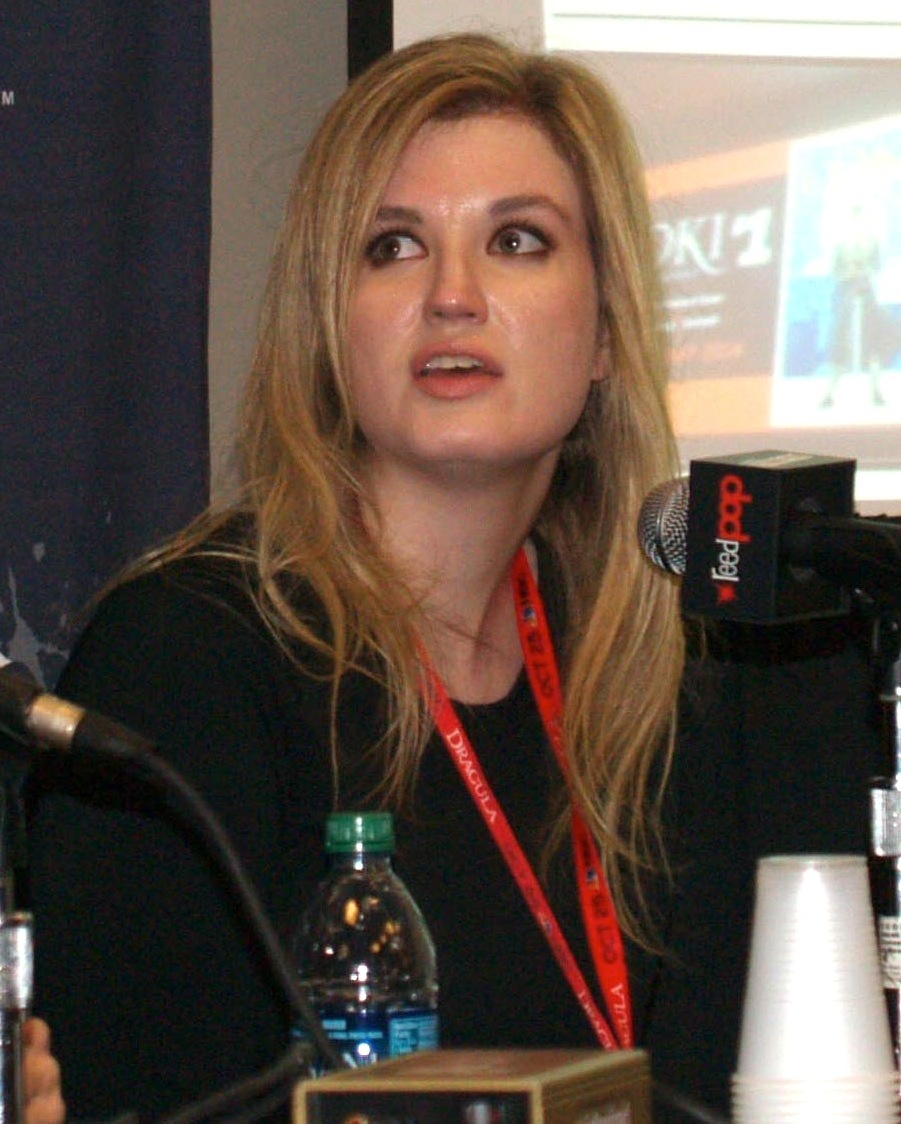
- Randolph in 2013
- Education: New York University
- Occupations: Writer; Host; YouTuber
- Years active: 2008–present

YouTube information
- Channel: Beyond the Trailer
- Years active: 2008–present
- Subscribers: 937 thousand
- Views: 950 million
- Last updated: 30 September 2026

Grace Randolph is an American film critic, YouTuber, and comic book writer. On YouTube, she hosts her channel Beyond the Trailer. She has written numerous comics, among them issues of Justice League Unlimited and X-Men: Nation X, as well as creating the original comic-book series Supurbia.

== Education ==
Randolph studied at New York University's Tisch School of the Arts, and studied sketch writing with the Upright Citizens Brigade comedy group.

== Career ==
=== Comic books ===
From 2008 to 2009, Randolph wrote for Tokyopop's manga adaptations of the Warcraft and StarCraft video game franchises.

In 2009, Randolph wrote DC Comics' Justice League Unlimited #41. She went on to write Boom! Studios' Muppet Peter Pan, which was a reinterpretation of Peter Pan as a Muppet story. In 2010 she wrote Her-oes, a comic book mini-series about the teenage years of some of Marvel Comics' most famous female Avengers. In 2011 she wrote for Archaia's Fraggle Rock comic.

In 2012, Randolph created and wrote the original comic book series Supurbia, which was published by Boom! Studios. Supurbia is a Real Housewives interpretation of the superhero genre, which "explores the drama of superheroes' personal lives" within the context of a suburban lifestyle. It was initially intended to be a four-issue limited series, but its success led to a twelve-issue continuation.

In November 2012, Randolph advocated that Marvel Studios fire James Gunn for offensive comments he made in 2009. In 2017, Randolph claimed that Gunn did not give Thanos a large role in his Guardians of the Galaxy films because he did not find the character interesting. Gunn denied her claim and later stated that Randolph "likes to just make up stuff I've said because it helps her get clicks." After Randolph claimed that the character Bane would appear in Gunn's Peacemaker series, Gunn said that the character "does not show up at the end or anywhere and has zero lines." After Randolph reported that audience reactions to Peacemaker were "less than stellar"; Gunn responded that "Grace Randolph will spout bullshit."

She has also written for Marvel Comics' X-Men: Nation X.

=== YouTube, television, and social media ===
In 2008, Randolph created Beyond the Trailer, a YouTube channel which discusses film and the film industry. In 2012, Beyond the Trailer became a part of Penske Media Corporation's digital network for a few years before leaving.

From 2010 to 2011, Randolph was the host of Marvel Comics' weekly web news show, The Watcher, before she was fired by Marvel.

In 2011, in association with Bleeding Cool, she created the YouTube channel Think About the Ink. The videos explore comic books and the comic book industry, as well as TV adaptations of comic book properties. The channel's last video was uploaded in March 2015.

From 2012 to 2013, she was associated with Movieline. In 2014 and 2015, she was an entertainment correspondent for WTNH NEWS8, appearing on Good Morning Connecticut.

In September 2020, Randolph claimed in a reaction video on Beyond the Trailer that The Mandalorian star Pedro Pascal had quit halfway through filming the second season over being denied more screen time without the title character's helmet on. Randolph further alleged that Pascal's behavior led to Lucasfilm killing his character off and replacing him with Boba Fett (played by Temuera Morrison) for the third season. When Pascal was asked about these reports in an interview with The One Show, he categorically denied Randolph's claims, while Pascal's stunt double confirmed Pascal's involvement with the entire third season in an Instagram post. Randolph refused to retract her story, arguing that the post-credits scene from The Mandalorian's second season finale, which foreshadowed The Book of Boba Fett, corroborated her claims. Jon Favreau, the showrunner of The Mandalorian, later clarified that The Book of Boba Fett was separate from the third season of The Mandalorian. Randolph's handling of the Pascal story was criticized by journalists, who described her report as clickbait and singled out her lack of reliable sources; they also asserted that her claims of Pascal being uncooperative on set could have potentially damaged his reputation and career.

In June 2020, Randolph reported that the film Birds of Prey underwent "massive reshoots" to take out an alleged dick pic storyline that contained elements of pedophilia. Director Cathy Yan vehemently denied the allegation while downplaying the severity of the reshoots, criticizing Randolph for her lack of research. Randolph defended her report, leading to an exchange between the two on Twitter with Yan questioning Randolph's credibility as a journalist.

=== Film ===
In 2019, Randolph appeared as a zombie in a post-credits scene in the film Zombieland: Double Tap alongside actor Bill Murray, who played a fictionalized version of himself.
