= Shane McCarthy =

Australian writer (born 1975)

- Born: 24 July 1975 (age 51)
- Area: Writer

Shane McCarthy (born 24 July 1975) is an Australian writer best known for his comic book work.

== Career ==
A comic book fan from an early age, McCarthy's first widely published work was the three-part Batman backup story Low for DC Comics in 2004, beginning in Detective Comics #797. McCarthy later was responsible for a reinvention of the Riddler character in the five-part Riddle Me That beginning in Batman: Legends of the Dark Knight #185 (2005) and followed it up with Victims in Detective Comics #816 (2006), pitting Batman against Zsasz.

Other published works include Zombies: Feast for IDW Publishing and contributions to Event Horizon for Mam Tor Publishing, and Star Wars Tales for Dark Horse.

McCarthy completed a twelve-part Transformers series entitled All Hail Megatron for IDW Publishing. He is the creator of the character Drift.

His work appears in Marvel's Dark X-Men: The Beginning #1.

McCarthy formerly ran a swing dancing school in Perth, Western Australia.

== Bibliography ==
Transformers for IDW Publishing

- All Hail Megatron (12 issues, 2008–2009)
- Spotlight: Blurr (one-shot, 2008)
- Spotlight: Drift (one-shot, 2009)
- Spotlight: Cliffjumper (one-shot, 2009)
- The Transformers: Drift (4 issues, 2010)
- Mars Attacks: The Transformers (one-shot, 2013)
- The Transformers: Drift - Empire of Stone (4 issues, 2014–2015)

Batman for DC Comics

- Low "Detective Comics" #797 - #799 (2004)
- Riddle Me That "Batman: Legends of The Dark Knight" #185 - #189 (2005)
- Victims "Detective Comics" #815 - #816 (2006)

Others:

- "Black Eight" in Star Wars Tales #21 (2004)
- Event Horizon #1 (2005)
- Event Horizon #2 (2005)
- Zombies! Feast (2006)
- Dark X-Men: The Beginning #1 (2009)
