= Dark X-Men =

Fictional comic book characters

- The Dark X-Men; Art by Simone Bianchi

Group publication information
- Publisher: Marvel Comics
- First appearance: Uncanny X-Men #513 (September 2009)
- Created by: Matt Fraction; Terry Dodson

In-story information
- Type of organization: Team
- Leader(s): Norman Osborn

Dark X-Men

Series publication information
- Publisher: Marvel Comics
- Schedule: Monthly
- Format: Limited series
- Genre: Superhero
- Publication date: (Dark X-Men: The Beginning); September – October 2009 (Dark X-Men); January – May 2010
- Number of issues: Dark X-Men: The Beginning; 3 Dark X-Men; 5

Creative team
- Writer(s): Dark X-Men: The Beginning; Paul Cornell; James Asmus; Shane McCarthy; Marc Bernardin; Adam Freeman; Rob Williams; Jason Aaron; Simon Spurrier; Dark X-Men; Paul Cornell
- Artist(s): Dark X-Men: The Beginning; Ibraim Roberson; Michel LaCombe; Paco Diaz; Jock; Paul Davidson
- Penciller(s): Dark X-Men: The Beginning; Leonard Kirk; Jesse Delperdang; Dark X-Men; Leonard Kirk
- Inker(s): Dark X-Men: The Beginning; Jay Leisten; Andy Lanning; Dark X-Men; Jay Leisten
- Letterer(s): Rob Steen
- Colorist(s): Dark X-Men: The Beginning; Brian Reber; Ranier Beredo; Matt Milla; John Rauch; Edgar Delgado; Dave Stewart; Dark X-Men; Brian Reber
- Creator(s): Matt Fraction; Terry Dodson
- Editor(s): Daniel Ketchum; Nick Lowe; Joe Quesada

The Dark X-Men are a team appearing in American comic books published by Marvel Comics. They made their debut during the crossover between Dark Avengers and Uncanny X-Men written by Matt Fraction, as part of the broader Dark Reign storyline. Each member but Namor has been handpicked by then–H.A.M.M.E.R. director Norman Osborn for his own criminal agenda.

In-universe, the team was never officially called the "Dark X-Men" (which was the name of the comics series, not the team). Instead, they were simply called the "X-Men" and were a government-sponsored team trying to take advantage of the name recognition of Professor X's X-Men, to which they had no official connection (much like Osborn's Dark Avengers team was pretending to be the real Avengers).

== Publication history ==
At the 2009 Emerald City ComiCon, writer Matt Fraction confirmed that the Dark X-Men would not be featured in a title of their own, but would rather be featured in Uncanny X-Men during the crossover with Dark Avengers.

In an April 16, 2009 interview with Comic Book Resources, Fraction explained the idea behind the Dark X-Men was to create three teams: Norman Osborn's Dark Avengers, Scott Summers's X-Men, and Emma Frost's new "Dark" X-Men.

Comic book writer Jason Aaron stated in March 2009 that Mystique would have a short story in the Dark X-Men: The Beginning mini-series, but did not confirm whether or not she would join the team; it was later shown that Mystique was impersonating Professor X to make the media believe Charles Xavier supported Osborn's decisions. Similarly, Dark Beast was mentioned as featured in the first two issues of Dark X-Men: The Beginning, but was not confirmed as member of the Dark X-Men. However, both of them were actually revealed as members of the team (with Mystique impersonating Professor X) in Uncanny X-Men #513, released on July 1, 2009.

Other members of the team Fraction chose include Cloak and Dagger, neither of which have had strong ties to any of the X-Men books. "They're here presented with a chance to have their reputations exonerated and their records sealed [if they join the Dark X-Men]," explains Fraction in an interview with Marvel.com. "Osborn presents it to them as the ultimate public service, [where] they can work off their past indiscretions—[such as] Cloak's dealings with the Avengers during the [Skrull] invasion." Fraction reveals the more appealing part of Dark X-Men was to see how Cloak and Dagger react in a real superhero team scenario. Cloak and Dagger's involvement with the Dark X-Men has put their proposed miniseries on hold.

Another team member worthy of note is Mimic, who sees joining this team as a chance to do some good. Writer James Asmus explained: "To actually be invited onto a team—and one working for the government, no less—gives him a vote of confidence that was sorely needed in his life. Unfortunately for Cal, he doesn't realize he didn't sign up with the good guys." The first issue of Dark X-Men: The Beginning will feature stories about Namor, Mimic and Dark Beast. The second featured stories about Cloak & Dagger, Weapon Omega and Daken. The third featured stories about Emma Frost, Namor, Mystique, and Norman Osborn trying to recruit Aurora.

Following the conclusion of Utopia, a 5-issue mini-series titled Dark X-Men, written by Paul Cornell and illustrated by Leonard Kirk, was published. The team roster consisted of Dark Beast, Mimic, Mystique (no longer impersonating Charles Xavier), and Weapon Omega, and showed the re-emergence of Nate Grey.

== Norman Osborn's X-Men ==
In 2009, a team of X-Men assembled by Norman Osborn during the "Utopia" storyline as part of the overarching "Dark Reign" event.

Members
Character	Real name
Mystique	Unrevealed (alias: Raven Darkhölme)
White Queen	Emma Frost
Sub-Mariner	Namor McKenzie
Wolverine	Daken Akihiro
Mimic	Calvin Montgomery Rankin
Omega	Michael Pointer
Cloak	Tyrone Johnson
Dagger	Tandy Bowen
Dark Beast (Earth-295)	Henry Philip McCoy

== Dark X-Men 2023 ==
A new Dark X-Men team is forged by Madelyne Pryor in 2023 in light of Orchis attacking the Hellfire Gala.

Members
Character	Name
Goblin Queen	Madelyne Pryor
Havok	Alexander Summers
Gimmick / Feint	Carmen Maria Cruz
Gambit	Remy Etienne LeBeau
Archangel	Warren Worthington III
Maggott	Japheth
Emplate	Marius St. Croix
Azazel
Zero	Kenji Uedo
Albert

== Collected editions ==
Title	Material collected	Published date	ISBN
Dark X-Men: The Beginning	Dark X-Men: The Beginning #1-3, X-Men Legacy #226-227	December 2009	978-0785142300
Avengers/X-Men: Utopia	Uncanny X-Men #513-514, X-Men: Legacy #226-227, Dark Avengers/Uncanny X-Men: Exodus, Dark Avengers/Uncanny X-Men: Utopia; Dark Avengers #7-8, Dark X-Men: The Beginning #1-3, Dark X-Men: The Confession	November 2009	978-0785142331
Dark X-Men	Dark X-Men #1-5	May 2010	978-0785145264
Dark X-Men: The Mercy Crown	Dark X-Men (2023) #1-5	July 2024	ISBN 978-1-302-95252-5
