= Emma Frost =

Marvel Comics fictional character

Emma Grace Frost White Queen
- Various incarnations of Emma Frost as depicted on the variant textless cover of Inferno vol. 2 #3 (December 2021). Art by Russell Dauterman.

Publication information
- Publisher: Marvel Comics
- First appearance: The Uncanny X-Men #129 (January 1980)
- Created by: Chris Claremont (writer); John Byrne (artist)

In-story information
- Full name: Emma Grace Frost
- Species: Human mutant
- Team affiliations: X-Men; Hellfire Club; Quiet Council of Krakoa; Generation X; Phoenix Five; Dark X-Men; Marauders; The Cabal; Hellions; Frost International; Legion Accursed
- Notable aliases: Hazel Kendal; White Queen; Black Queen; Black King; Ice Queen
- Abilities: Telepathic abilities: Mental sedation, paralysis, and suggestions; Psionic blast, shielding, and lightning; Mind reading and control; Telepathic illusions; Pain inducement; Astral projection; Power inhibition; Memory wiping; Shapeshifting into an organic diamond form, granting: Superhuman strength, durability, and stamina; Nigh-invulnerability; Psychic immunity (but greatly diminishing her psychic powers); Skilled hand-to-hand combatant

Emma Grace Frost is a character appearing in American comic books published by Marvel Comics. Created by writer Chris Claremont and artist/co-writer John Byrne, the character first appeared in The Uncanny X-Men #129 (January 1980). She belongs to a subspecies of humans called mutants who are born with superhuman abilities. Her mutation grants her high-level telepathic abilities and the power to turn into organic diamond. Emma Frost has evolved from a supervillain and foe of the X-Men to becoming a superhero and one of the team's most central members and leaders. The character has also been known as the White Queen of the Hellfire Club.

Although originally depicted as a supervillain, Emma Frost has been described as one of Marvel's most notable and powerful female heroes, being labeled as a femme fatale.

Since her original introduction in comics, Frost has been featured in various other Marvel-licensed products, including films, video games, animated television series, and merchandise such as trading cards. She has been portrayed by Finola Hughes in the television pilot Generation X (1996), and by Tahyna Tozzi and January Jones in the films X-Men Origins: Wolverine (2009) and X-Men: First Class (2011), respectively. Samara Weaving will portray the character in the Marvel Cinematic Universe, starting with the untitled X-Men film (2028).

== Publication history ==
=== Concept and creation ===
Chris Claremont was inspired to create the Hellfire Club after seeing the episode "A Touch of Brimstone" from the television show The Avengers. Spy duo John Steed and Emma Peel infiltrate a criminal and hedonistic underground society. Emma Frost was specifically inspired by the character of Emma Peel portrayed by actress Diana Rigg. In the episode, Rigg famously dons a provocative corset, collar, and boots and becomes the "Queen of Sin", which was incorporated into the design of Frost.

=== 1980s and 1990s ===
Emma Frost debuted in the Dark Phoenix Saga storyline in The Uncanny X-Men #129 (January 1980), created by writer Chris Claremont and artist co-writer John Byrne. She later appeared in the 1983 New Mutants series. She appeared in the 1986 Firestar miniseries, by Tom DeFalco, Mary Wilshire, and Steve Leialoha.

She later appeared in the 1994 Generation X series, by Scott Lobdell, Chris Bachalo, and Mark Buckingham.

=== 2000s and 2010s ===
Emma Frost appeared in the 2001 New X-Men series, by Grant Morrison. Using Frost as a character was suggested to Morrison on their website by a fan. While Morrison initially had no plans to use her, the death of the character Colossus left Morrison with an opening. Morrison created Emma's secondary mutation – a super-strong diamond form – as a replacement for Colossus' powers and added her to the cast. In the series, she becomes a leading member of the X-Men and begins a relationship with Cyclops that continues in many later stories. The Morrison series also introduces the Stepford Cuckoos, her clone-daughters.

She later appeared in the 2003 Emma Frost series — her first solo comic book series — by Karl Bollers. She appeared in the Astonishing X-Men. series, by Joss Whedon and John Cassaday. She appeared in the 2006 X-Men: Deadly Genesis series, by Ed Brubaker. She appeared in the 2010 X-Men Origins: Emma Frost one-shot, her first standalone comic book.

=== 2020s ===
Emma Frost appeared in the 2020 Giant-Size X-Men: Jean Grey & Emma Frost one-shot, her second standalone comic book, by Jonathan Hickman and Russell Dauterman. She appeared in the 2021 X-Men series. She appeared in the 2021 Way of X series. She appears in the 2023 Sins of Sinister series. She appeared in the 2023 Invincible Iron Man series. A new Emma Frost solo series, Emma Frost: The White Queen, was announced in April 2025, written by Amy Chu and drawn by Andrea Di Vito.

== Fictional character biography ==
=== Early life ===
Emma Frost was born in Boston, Massachusetts, to the wealthy Winston Frost and Hazel Frost. She is the third of four children. Her siblings are Christian, Adrienne, and Cordelia. Winston was cold, ruthless, and domineering, often imposing impossibly high standards, while Hazel abused prescription drugs to cope with the household tensions. Emma had no emotional support from her parents or her sisters, but got along with her brother Christian.

At school, Frost was bullied by her peers but found support in her teacher Ian Kendall. When her telepathic powers manifested, Frost was able to read the minds of others and glean information. Frost became a tutor to the other students. Kendall recommended that she become a teacher, something Frost's father refused. On her way home from school one day, Frost's car stopped functioning, and Kendall gave her a ride home. After reading his thoughts and learning that he thought she was beautiful and intelligent, Frost kissed him. Her sister Adrienne recorded it, and her father used the evidence to get Kendall fired. Frost retaliated by blackmailing her father. Intrigued by her actions, her father offered her the family fortune, but Frost rejected his offer and decided to make her own way in life.

After a period of homelessness, Frost met and fell in love with Troy, a young man who agreed to let her live with him. She learned that he owed a large amount of money to a local mobster, Lucien. To save Troy's life, Frost agreed to participate in a fake kidnapping scheme in an attempt to extort the remainder of Troy's debt from her father. However, this soon turned into a real kidnapping; Troy was killed while valiantly attempting to save Frost from an enraged Lucien. Using her powers, Frost turned the thugs against one another inside an illusion, causing an imaginary gunfight to erupt. The panicked, supposed last survivor freed her. She subsequently called the police anonymously, and the criminals were taken into custody with no memory of her.

Frost took the ransom money and enrolled at Empire State University. There, she began to learn about mutants for the first time and met fellow telepath Astrid Bloom who became her friend and mentor. Frost later learned that Astrid had been secretly manipulating events. Furious, she attacked Astrid telepathically and left her comatose. Frost was later invited to the Hellfire Club, an underground elite society. Frost discovered the plans of Edward Buckman and Steven Lang to destroy all mutants. Alongside Sebastian Shaw, Lourdes Chantel, and Harry Leland, Frost battled Lang's Sentinels. Frost killed Buckman and the Council of the Chosen, then – along with Shaw – took control of the Hellfire Club, and set themselves up as Lords Cardinal of the Inner Circle of the Hellfire Club.

=== White Queen of the Hellfire Club ===
As White Queen of the Hellfire Club, Frost held many titles, one of which was chair of the board and CEO of Frost International, which helped to fund the activities of the Lords Cardinal. Frost also became the chair of the board of trustees and the headmistress of the Massachusetts Academy, a school for mutants which served as a counterpoint to Professor Charles Xavier's School for Gifted Youngsters. Frost and the club's agents later attempted to recruit Kitty Pryde for the Massachusetts Academy, and captured (and Frost personally tortured) several members of the X-Men, including Storm, Colossus, Wolverine, and Phoenix. Frost engaged Phoenix in a psychic battle in which she was overpowered and on the verge of being killed. Frost launched a last-minute attack that led the X-Men to believe she had committed suicide, though in truth, she was comatose and recovering from Phoenix's attack under the care of Shaw. In another encounter with the Hellfire Club, Frost telepathically forced Pryde's parents to transfer her from Xavier's school to Massachusetts Academy. Frost then switched minds with Storm to defeat the X-Men from within their own ranks. However, the process was soon reversed, restoring the women to their respective bodies. Later, Frost was rendered comatose temporarily by Mastermind.

=== The Hellions ===
During her time with the Hellfire Club, Frost continued to run the Massachusetts Academy and mentored the mutant team known as the Hellions. Frost attempted to recruit several gifted youngsters to her cause: Firestar, Doug Ramsey and Pryde, all of which resulted in altercations. Alongside the Hellions, Frost encountered the Hellions' rival team, Xavier's New Mutants, several times. When the New Mutants were later killed and resurrected by the Beyonder, they were left traumatized and withdrawn. Frost offered her assistance in telepathically restoring them to their former selves. She then coerced their headmaster Magneto into allowing them to join the Massachusetts Academy. With Shaw and Selene, Frost invited Magneto to join the Hellfire Club. Alongside the Hellfire Club, Frost battled the High Evolutionary's forces to rescue Magma, helped Magneto search for the New Mutants when they had gone missing, encountered the effects of the Inferno, and eventually formed an alliance with Selene and Magneto to oust Shaw from the inner circle.

When the time traveling mutant Trevor Fitzroy unleashed the mutant-hunting Sentinels on Frost and her Hellions, Frost placed herself in a psychic coma to survive the ordeal. Her students however, were not as lucky and were killed by Fitzroy to fuel his time portals. Frost later awakened in the Xavier Academy. Disoriented, she switched minds with Iceman. Refusing to believe the X-Men when they told her that the Hellions were dead, she escaped. She was overcome with grief and guilt when she discovered that her students were indeed dead; she was briefly suicidal. Professor Xavier consoled Frost and was able to coax her to switch back.

=== Generation X ===
Frost later teamed up with the X-Men to defeat the Phalanx, and in the process, rescued a select group of teenage mutants who became a superhero team known as Generation X, to whom Frost and Banshee became mentors at the reopened Massachusetts Academy. After Frost's business ventures took a bad turn, she sought help from her estranged sister Adrienne who was a psychometrist. Adrienne offered financial assistance but secretly plotted against Frost and planted a bomb at the school, resulting in the death of Synch. Frost tracked down and killed Adrienne, but after returning to the academy, grew increasingly distant from her students in an effort to hide her crime. When the students learned what Frost did, the students became estranged from her, and Generation X disbanded.

=== Joining and leading the X-Men ===
Struggling to move past the grief of having murdered her sister, Frost moved to the mutant haven island of Genosha, where she taught at a mutant school until a Sentinel attack killed most of the island's inhabitants; Frost survived due to the sudden manifestation of her secondary mutation: the power to transform herself into a flexible, near-invulnerable, diamond-like substance. Rescued by the X-Men, Frost was accepted as a member and resumed her teaching career at the Xavier Institute. She mentored the Stepford Cuckoos, a group of telepathic quintuplets who quickly became her prized pupils. Frost and the Cuckoos proved themselves when they helped fight and defeat Cassandra Nova. As a member of the X-Men, Frost began counseling over Cyclops's marital issues with Jean Grey. She quickly developed feelings for him but Cyclops initially rejected her advances.

As Scott Summers confided more in Frost, the two engaged in a psychic affair. While quelling a riot at the school, Sophie of the Stepford Cuckoos was killed and the others rejected Frost's mentorship, blaming her for the death. They attempted to get revenge by telepathically contacting Jean about Frost's and Cyclops's psychic affair. In the aftermath of the riot, Jean caught Frost and Summers in bed together in their minds. In a rage, Jean unleashed reignited Phoenix powers and psychically humiliated Frost. Afterward, Frost was found physically shattered in her diamond form. As Bishop and Sage investigated the crime, Jean used increasingly growing Phoenix powers to reassemble Frost's body, acknowledging that Frost had genuinely fallen in love with Scott. Scott confronted Jean and demands that she read his mind; Jean finally complied, only to discover that Scott and Frost never engaged in any physical contact, though Frost had offered it. Revived, Frost was able to name her attempted murderer: Esme of the Stepford Cuckoos who had mind-controlled fellow student Angel Salvadore into shooting Frost with a diamond bullet, under the direction of Xorn.

Scott was devastated by Jean's death, and considered leaving the X-Men once more. It was revealed in the "Here Comes Tomorrow" storyline that, had he done so, it would have led to an apocalyptic alternate future. To prevent this, a resurrected, future-version of Jean used her powers as the White Phoenix of the Crown and telepathically reached through time to tell Cyclops it was ok to move on, declaring all she ever did was "die" on him and he deserved a chance to "live". Scott began a real relationship with Frost, kissing her physically for the first time by Jean's grave. The new relationship between Frost and Scott led to problems between them and the rest of the X-Men, all of whom believed that the pair were doing Jean's memory a disservice. Frost became co-headmistress with Cyclops and adviser to a new team of Hellions. She developed an antagonistic relationship with Pryde as fellow teachers and Rachel Grey, however, a truce was reached when Frost offered to help hone Rachel's telepathic abilities.

=== Decimation ===
Following the "Decimation" storyline, the student population drastically decreased, and Frost, without consulting Cyclops, decided to revamp the entire workings of the school.

=== Phoenix Warsong ===
During the 2006 miniseries X-Men: Phoenix - Warsong, it was revealed that Frost's ova were the genetic templates used to clone thousands of identical female telepaths, five of whom are the Stepford Cuckoos. The encapsulated offspring began to refer to Frost as "mother" – a title which she later accepted. In the end, the Phoenix (inhabiting the body of Celeste Cuckoo) destroyed the thousands of additional clones, Frost was pained by the loss of her cloned children and declared revenge against the Phoenix.

=== Astonishing X-Men ===
In the series Astonishing X-Men, a flashback showed that Frost's survival of the destruction of Genosha was due to Cassandra Nova creating Frost's secondary mutation as part of a scheme to infiltrate the X-Men as a sleeper agent. The guilt ridden Frost created psychic manifestations of a new Hellfire Club and proceeded to take down the X-Men one by one by showing them their deepest fears. Later on it was revealed that Frost's survivor's guilt is being exacerbated by Nova who had placed a glimmer of her mind in Frost's before being trapped in the body of Stuff, and that Nova had even tricked Frost into thinking she had been complicit in the destruction of Genosha. Kitty, with aid from Cyclops, Blindfold, Hisako Ichiki, and Frost herself eventually prevented Nova from transferring her mind into Hisako. Everyone present was then suddenly teleported onto a S.W.O.R.D. ship headed towards Breakworld. The arc concluded with Kitty trapped in the bullet heading towards Earth and the team trying to find various ways to save the Earth and Kitty. Frost kept in telepathic contact with Kitty, trying to reassure her, even offering to psionically sedate her. Kitty sacrificed herself, phasing the bullet through Earth. In the aftermath, the X-Men were uncertain of Kitty's fate, believing her to either be dead or at least phased into part of the runaway bullet. Frost was devastated.

=== Civil War ===
During the 2006–2007 storyline "Civil War", Frost, during a conversation with Iron Man, announced that the Xavier Institute and the X-Men would not support the Superhuman Registration Act and would remain neutral, as she feared that the registration of mutants would put them in more danger.

=== Messiah Complex ===
During the 2007–2008 storyline "Messiah Complex", Frost was part of the team that investigated the detection of a new mutant in Alaska. She also defended the X-Men from the Marauders and the telepathy of Sinister and Exodus. Frost is seen with Cyclops's team of X-Men looking for Cable and then tracking down the Marauders with the Cuckoos. Later when X-Force arrived at the Marauders' hideout, Frost took out Harpoon. During the final battle on Muir Island, she faced Exodus, stalemating him in a telepathic duel, until Dust was able to enter his body and scour his lungs with her sand form, incapacitating him.

=== Divided We Stand ===
In the 2008 storyline "Divided We Stand", Frost and Scott vacationed in the Savage Land but soon left to answer a distress call made by Archangel from San Francisco. The couple saved San Francisco from an out of control Martinique Jason. Afterwards, the Mayor of San Francisco welcomed the X-Men with open arms as their new super-hero team and Frost and Cyclops sent out a telepathic message to all remaining mutants throughout the world, informing them that San Francisco was considered a sanctuary for the remaining mutants in the world.

=== Manifest Destiny ===
In the 2008–2009 storyline "Manifest Destiny", a new anti-mutant group calling themselves the "Hellfire Cult" appeared in the Bay Area, committing various anti-mutant hate crimes. They are led by Frost's former pupil, Empath, as well as a mysterious red-haired dominatrix telepath who calls herself the Red Queen. After Empath discloses his experience of lusting after Frost during his days at the Massachusetts Academy, the dominatrix takes on Frost's appearance. While investigating the Hellfire Cult's base, Cyclops is seduced by the Red Queen. Later while at a Dazzler concert, Scott reveals that the Red Queen is Madelyne Pryor.

Frost also expresses doubts about whether or not she deserves to be an X-Man, only to have veteran X-Man Wolverine assure her that she has earned her place on the team. Later, when Xavier attempts to warn Cyclops about his recent encounter with Sinister, Frost manages to enter the Professor's mind undetected. During the course of their encounter, Frost forces Xavier to relive each of his mistakes and morally ambiguous decisions made under altruistic pretenses. It is also revealed that while Frost is just as angry with Xavier as Cyclops is, she also wants to help him move on with his life. Frost points the Professor in a new direction by forcing him to relive Moira MacTaggert's death and reminding him of her last words.

=== Secret Invasion ===
In the 2008 storyline "Secret Invasion", Frost is seen fighting Skrull forces in San Francisco during the invasion. There, the Skrulls set up a telepathy-blocking "wall" throughout the globe. Frost channels the Cuckoos' telepathy into her own using Cerebra in an attempt to locate the source of the psi-blockade but is left comatose. The Cuckoos tell Cyclops that Frost is dead, unaware that Frost's telepathic mind is continuing to battle the psychic team of Skrulls. Setting a series of traps through misdirection, Frost manages to break free and shut down the psi-blockade. Following the Skrulls' defeat, she is introduced as a member of a secret cabal, consisting of herself, Norman Osborn, Doctor Doom, Loki, Namor and the Hood, who are manipulating events in their favor.

=== Dark Reign ===
In the 2008–2009 storyline "Dark Reign", Frost, after waking from a vision about the Sentry, is invited to join Osborn's Cabal. At the meeting, it is revealed that she and Prince Namor share a romantic history. During her days as the White Queen, Sebastian Shaw sent Frost to convince Namor to join the Hellfire Club. Instead, Namor took her to his kingdom and they began a relationship. Believing Frost to have betrayed him for Namor, Shaw sent a reprogrammed sentinel to Atlantis, attacking the two and destroying the kingdom. When Namor confronted Shaw for his treachery, Sage took a telepathic hold of Frost, erasing her memories of Namor, who vowed revenge on Shaw. In the present, Frost reveals that after her initial battle with the Phoenix she pieced her memories of Namor back together. She makes a pact with him, seducing Shaw and using her telepathy to make Namor believe she has executed him, while secretly telepathically incapacitating Shaw. Per their deal, Namor vows to protect mutant-kind as his own people, while Frost, more determined to fill her role as a leader of mutant-kind, contacts Scott to have Shaw captured by the X-Men for "crimes against mutant-kind." Approaching him later in his cell, Frost reveals that she has captured Shaw for Namor and on the basis that the Sentinels he commissioned were ones later used by Cassandra Nova to destroy Genosha. She sentences him to remember nothing but the faces of the Genoshan victims using her telepathy.

==== Sisterhood of Mutants ====
The Red Queen, along with her magically powered Sisterhood of Mutants attack the X-Men with the end goal of locating Jean's corpse. Lady Mastermind ambushes Frost nullifying her mind with a mixture of magical and psychic chaff. Frost has a vision telling her to prepare for future events involving the Phoenix Force and eventually breaks free. She defeats the Mastermind sisters and later attacks the rest of the Sisterhood at their base with the X-Men.

==== Dark X-Men ====
Frost is appointed to lead Osborn's new team of "Dark X-Men". Each member is hand-picked by Osborn but Frost has Namor added to the team for her own reasons. The team debuts to the public as the official "X-Men" maintaining high public approval through Osborn's careful media strategy. They oust the original X-Men, portraying them as a dangerous militia. Meanwhile, Frost discovers that Osborn is working with the Dark Beast, torturing apprehended mutants and feeding their powers into a machine that empowers Weapon Omega. Cyclops sends X-Force on a strategic evacuation of the mutant prisoners, resulting in a planned confrontation with the Dark X-Men. As the teams prepare to face off, Frost then reveals her role as a double agent, defeating the Dark X-Men with Namor's assistance. She extends an invitation to Cloak and Dagger to join the true X-Men as they teleport to the newly created island base Utopia. Upon learning of this, Norman orders the Dark Avengers and Dark X-Men to go after Frost, Namor, and Scott. During the final battle, Frost distracts the godlike Sentry by separating the Void persona from Bob Reynolds's persona. Doing so allows the Sentry to regain control and flee the battle, however, Frost cannot contain the Void and it chases after the Sentry, though a sliver of it remains within her body. Frost is forced to remain in diamond form to prevent the sliver of the Void from utilizing her omega-level psychic abilities. Eventually it came to the decision to extract the Void. With Professor X's aid, they bridged Cyclops's mind to Frost. However, the Void instead took over his body, only for Scott to contain it within an inescapable prison in his mind.

=== Necrosha ===
Frost, Shaw and Donald Pierce are targeted by Selene for betraying her years ago in her plan to ascend to godhood. Additionally, Selene is also angry over Frost using the Black Queen moniker when she was leading the Dark X-Men. She resurrects the Hellions and sends them to attack and taunt Frost. Their appearance is enough, to leave Frost in a horrified state of shock and guilt. Once Selene's inner circle appears on Utopia Frost recognizes Blink and stops Wolverine from killing Wither. However, in the aftermath Selene's inner circle succeed in capturing Warpath, injuring Angel and ruthlessly killing Onyxx and Diamond Lil before returning to Necrosha. Frost recognizes that the threat will not end until Selene and her inner circle are permanently stopped, and orders X-Force to travel to Necrosha and kill them all, including Wither.

=== Second Coming ===
During the events of the 2010 "Second Coming" storyline, Frost acts as moral support to Scott as well as the prime means of communication between Scott and his Alpha Roster of X-Men. When Rogue becomes aware that she has an empathic connection to Hope, she contacts Frost for help, Frost finds that the bond is not telepathic in nature. Along with all the other telepaths among the X-Men, Frost is affected by the psionic backlash when Bastion shuts Cerebra down. Frost takes part in the battle on the Golden Gate Bridge and watches with concern as Hope manifests the Phoenix Force energy signature.

After the battle is over, the students have a bonfire to try to relax. As Frost stands around in her diamond state, she sees the Phoenix Force manifest around Hope, prompting her to remember that the Phoenix had told her to "prepare". Horrified, she runs after Scott to tell him about what she saw and what she remembered. Finding him in Cerebra, Scott tells her five new mutants have manifested their powers across the globe.

=== Avengers vs. X-Men ===
In the 2012 storyline "Avengers vs. X-Men", Frost is one of the five X-Men taken over by the power of the Phoenix Force. Under its influence, she finds and kills a man who committed a hit and run against a mutant over a decade earlier. She also reveals to Cyclops that she had a psychic affair with Namor. During the final showdown against the Avengers and the X-Men, her portion of the Phoenix is violently taken by Cyclops. Frost is taken into custody by the Avengers and survives an assassination attempt by members of the Purifiers.

=== All-New X-Men ===
Frost is rescued from prison by Cyclops and Magneto, but it is revealed that her time as a Phoenix has rendered her telepathy erratic at best. Despite her resentment of Cyclops' recent actions she consents to depart with him to resume his mission to protect mutants. Frost trained in secret and regained full control over her telepathy. She continued as acting tutor for the Stepford Cuckoos and Jean Grey in the use of their powers.

=== All-New, All-Different Marvel ===
Black Bolt is believed to have killed Cyclops; in reality, Cyclops died from exposure to the Terrigen Mist on Muir Island. Since then Frost had been projecting an illusion of Cyclops to everyone else as a means of declaring war against the Inhumans in his name.

=== Inhumans vs. X-Men ===
Frost declares war on the Inhumans when Beast reports that the Terrigen cloud will soon saturate and render Earth as completely uninhabitable for mutants, believing they have no time to attempt negotiation. When Medusa learns the truth about why the X-Men went to war against the Inhumans, she willingly destroys the cloud and ends the possibility of future Inhuman manifestations so the mutants can survive.

After the time-displaced younger Cyclops reveals that Frost faked his future self's death, Frost insists that she did what Cyclops would have chosen to do if he could, subsequently fleeing the battlefield with the aid of Havok after using reprogrammed sentinels to slaughter the Inhumans from Ennilux. She is later shown in a secret base donning a helmet that is a combination of Cyclops's and Magneto's in preparation for her next move, as she is now wanted and on the run from both the Inhumans and the X-Men for her actions since Cyclops's death.

=== Secret Empire ===
During the Secret Empire storyline, Frost is revealed to be the true leader of the mutant nation in New Tian, which is somewhere in California, following Hydra's takeover of the United States. She is using Xorn as her puppet ruler and controlling him with her telepathy. A flashback showed that Frost claimed a Cosmic Cube fragment from the unconscious Shang-Chi. When the time-displaced original X-Men rebel against New Tian's government, Frost has Xorn send a group of mutants after them, succeeding in capturing most of the team except for Jean and Jimmy Hudson. She then talks to the younger Cyclops in his cell and telepathically torments him. It is revealed that Frost has been secretly working against Hydra. She, Beast, and Sebastian lead the raids on Supreme Hydra leader Steve Rogers's throne, until Arnim Zola infuses the brainwashed leader with a power of the Cosmic Cube, and he bests them all easily.

=== Becoming Black King ===
Following Magneto's attack, Frost talks the X-Men into taking out the Inner Circle members of the Hellfire Club, while she goes after Sebastian, the man who made her the White Queen so many years ago. Though Shaw is still immune to her telepathy, Frost had an associate place a paralytic agent in his drink, allowing her to defeat him. Frost assumes the role of the Hellfire Club's Black King, including a new darker outfit, and explaining in a letter to the X-Men that she intended to fix the broken world for mutants in her own way by taking control of the Hellfire Club.

=== Nation of Krakoa ===
After the founding of the mutant nation of Krakoa in House of X and Powers of X, Frost is again White Queen, now of the Hellfire Trading Company. The Hellfire Club has been re-imagined as the Hellfire Trading Company, which is responsible for legally exporting the miracle drugs produced on Krakoa. As White Queen, Frost has a seat on the Quiet Council, the ruling body of Krakoa. In addition, she created the Marauders, a team led by Kate Pryde and responsible for handling the black market for the miracle drugs, among other concerns.

== Powers and abilities ==
Emma Frost possesses high-level telepathic abilities and is capable of transforming into an organic diamond state. Frost has been a host to the Phoenix Force.

=== Telepathy ===
Emma Frost is classified as an "Omega-Class telepath." She is capable of psionic feats, including the telepathic standards of: broadcasting and receiving thoughts, mind-control, altering perceptions and memories, psychic shielding, astral projection, mind switching, brain engram modification, mental sedation, mental paralysis, induction of mental pain, projection of psionic force bolts or blast waves, and psionic lightning. She is also able to boost or activate a mutant's powers through accessing their brain's neurological pathways, and can communicate across global distances unaided. Her abilities have been stated to rival those of Charles Xavier himself. She has also been referred to as a "psi of the highest order", been ranked among the five most skilled telepaths on the planet, demonstrated the ability to stalemate Exodus, and overcome telepaths classified as potentially capable of producing unlimited psionic energy (such as Nate Grey, Kid Omega and Rachel Summers) through greater experience and skill.

=== Diamond form ===
Emma Frost manifests a secondary mutation, giving her the ability to transform her body into organic diamond, at the moment of the destruction of Genosha. She is translucent, retains mobility while being nearly invulnerable, and is able to support incredible amounts of weight. Her diamond body is virtually tireless since she does not produce fatigue toxins and has no need for water or food. She is also numbed from emotion, pain, and empathy, impervious to cold, and resistant to heat in this form. Furthermore, in this form, she does not need to breathe. Her diamond form also grants her superhuman strength. She has been shown to defeat Warpath, and Jessica Jones, injure Black Bolt, and has sent Lady Mastermind flying through a wall with a single punch.

Frost is unable to access her psychic powers due to suppression by her diamond form's adamantine luster. However, she is also granted total telepathic immunity while in diamond form. Her diamond form is also stated to emit low-level ultraviolet light, causing it to glow in darkness.

Nonetheless, her diamond form has a single molecular flaw, which, if exploited – such as being shot with a diamond bullet – can cause her body to shatter.

=== Telekinetic potential ===
On occasion, it has been hinted that Frost is also a latent telekinetic. Jean Grey's displaced psyche was able to use Frost's brain to generate a telekinetic force field and fly. During the Onslaught Saga, Frost unwittingly levitated several kitchen utensils while having a bad dream. When the mutant Synch "synched" with Frost's powers, he was able to use them to levitate several objects and individuals in the room. This phenomenon is then referred to as telekinesis and credited to Frost's psi powers.

=== Education and expertise ===
Emma Frost holds college degrees in multiple fields, including a Bachelor of Science in education with a minor in Business Administration from Empire State University. She is also an accomplished businesswoman and was, for many years, the founder and CEO of Frost Enterprises, a major multinational conglomerate headquartered in New York City that rivaled Stark Industries and Worthington Industries. The company specialized in shipping, aerospace engineering and new technology R&D.

She is also a highly capable planner, an electronics expert, and can invent machines that grant various psionic abilities, such as "Multivac", a mutant locater capable of monitoring the psionic levels of mutants; the "Hallucinator" used to induce hypnotic hallucinations to brainwash others; the gun-like device that enabled her to exchange minds and powers with Storm; and the Mindtap mechanism which enhanced and enabled her Hellfire cohort Mastermind to project his illusions directly into the mind of the Phoenix.

Emma Frost is well versed in medical disciplines such as neurology, biochemistry, pathophysiology and genetics. This has allowed her to medically cure Polaris from an array of infectious diseases and examine Iceman's brain physiology. Additionally, Frost has also been shown to bootstrap her own brain chemistry to counter a neurotoxin.

=== Resources and anonymity ===
Emma Frost possesses vast wealth as the owner of several multibillion-dollar conglomerates: Frost International, Frost Enterprises and Meridian Enterprises. She has also invested in numerous companies and projects, including oil companies, Stark Industries, Wakandan Airways, Ben Nishmura's gamma research, Reed Richards' patent for unstable molecules and Cummings Aeronautics helicarrier project. As CEO of Frost International, Emma also has access to a wide range of technologies, some designed by herself, or made through acquisitions of corporations such as LaNeige Industries which specialises in trans-dimensional travel and weaponry.

Her wealth and legal resources (Brooke & Webster esq plc) affords her a degree of anonymity over the digital medium. This has been shown to extend to databases owned by the Avengers, and the Sentinel Bastion. Furthermore, several injunctions have been in place to prevent any discussion or referencing of Frost or her moniker the "White Queen" on any public networks.

As a member of the Phoenix Five, Emma Frost at one point telepathically scanned every single superhuman and human mind on the planet digging for the darkest of secrets and information.

=== Attire and paraphernalia ===
Emma Frost regards her revealing attire as battle armour which may give her a psychological edge against any opponent. Additionally, she considers high-heeled footwear as vital to her attire, and has demonstrated balance and proficiency with them in hand-to-hand combat. Frost has to maintain a careful balance between her fashion sensibilities and being on the battlefield as this has on one occasion hindered her mobility on mountainous terrain.

== Cultural impact and legacy ==
=== Critical response ===
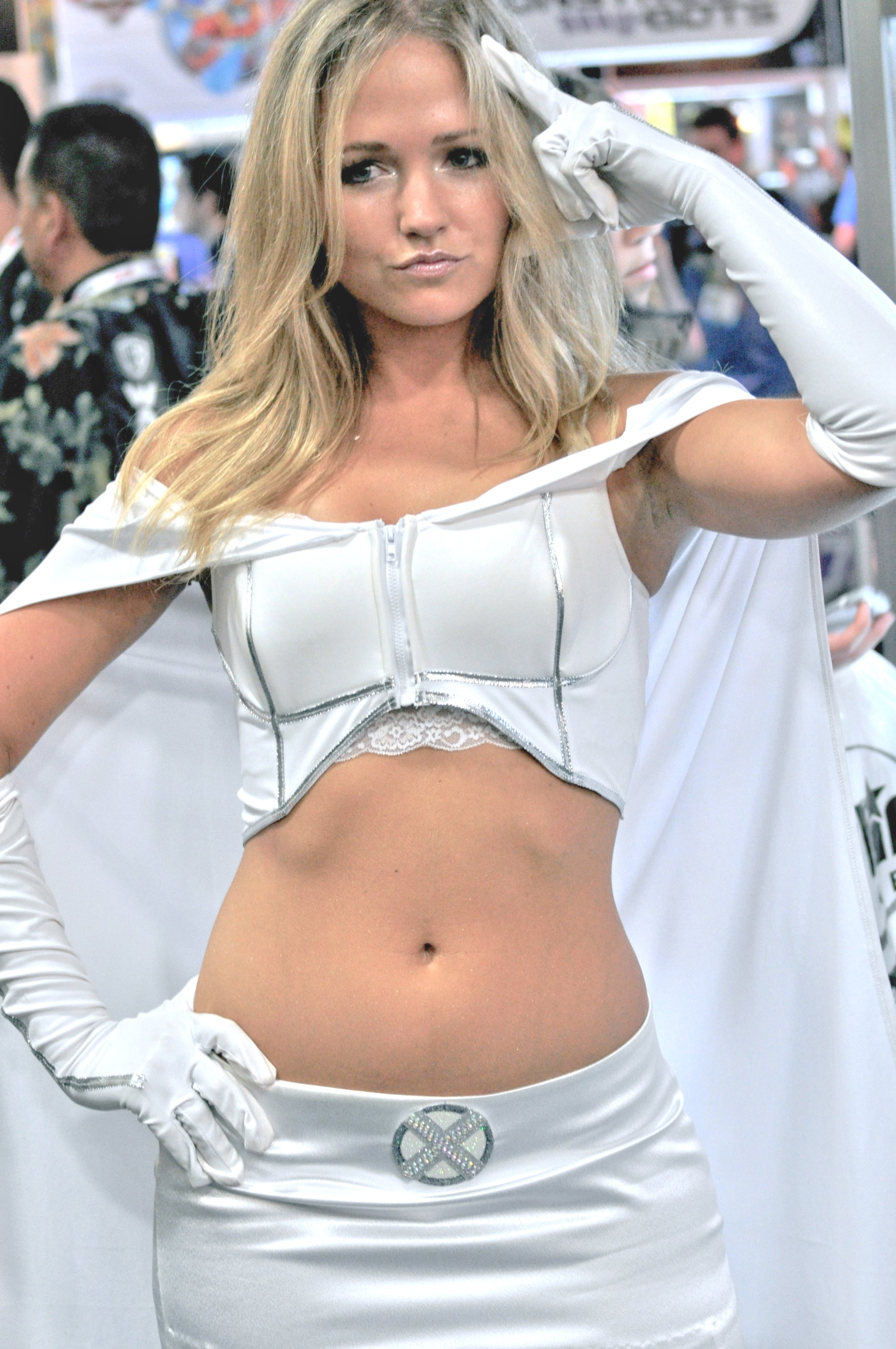
A cosplayer dressed as Emma Frost

Sara Century of Syfy stated, "In the end, much of Emma's sex appeal is based in her directness, her ability to compromise in impossible situations, and her deep understanding of establishing consent and boundaries with her partners. Her ability to put herself in the mind of her lovers and fulfill what they need shows deeply felt altruism. Though Scott seems to be the only man she has genuinely loved, with all her partners she laid the groundwork for mutually beneficial relationships. Emma Frost is a beautiful, intelligent woman who helped lead the X-Men with the ruthless mind of a true businesswoman, but it's her hidden compassion that informs much of her sexuality. That surprising potential for open, messy, life-changing love is one of the reasons she continues to fascinate readers to this day."

Emily Stachelczyk of Screen Rant called Emma Frost the "best anti-hero in the pantheon of Marvel Comics," writing, "She has always looked after herself and carefully manipulated the environment around her to her advantage. This potential to switch sides is why she's the superior Marvel anti-hero. Deadpool, while a good anti-hero, is not the best because his alignment is less suspect than Emma Frost's. Her jumbled history of villainy and heroism not only keeps fans guessing, but also embodies that balance anti-hero characters strive for. Deadpool, while impressive, does not carry Emma Frost's Machiavellian anti-hero status. It is never a guarantee that she will choose to be a hero in a moral dilemma, especially when considering that Deadpool does not always lack conventional heroic attributes when it comes down to the wire. Overall Emma Frost's journey with the X-Men and lapses into villainy solidifies what it means to be a Marvel anti-hero."

Chase Magnett of ComicBook.com called Emma Frost one of "Marvel's most interesting characters and someone with a devoted readership," saying, "Even when you set aside Emma Frost's extensive history and her impressive powerset, she's still a Marvel character in desperate need of a solo series. That's because she's one of the most complex and interesting characters at the publisher today. Even in her earliest days as a villainous member of the Hellfire Club and leader of the Hellions, her motives were far more complicated than world domination. She is someone who has understood the multi-faceted nature of power and how it is essential in defining one's place in the world. Every action she takes, even the misguided ones, stems from relatable fears and concerns and a heart that's far greater than her early appearances revealed. Emma Frost has always been a character looking to make an impact and she has across the past 30 years of X-Men comics. No matter which sort of role she has played within that team's many configurations, she has always been big enough to push them in new and surprising directions."

Andrew Wheeler of ComicsAlliance wrote, "Women's issues and LGBT issues are intimately aligned, because both present opposition to the notion of straight cis male supremacy. Women represent a challenge to conformity, which is why female heroes and icons tend to be more important than male heroes in all corners of the LGBT community. The X-Men include many of the best female heroes in comics. Characters like Storm, Emma Frost, Rogue, Kitty Pryde, and Mystique, frequently shatter old-fashioned ideas about sex and gender through their strength, independence, leadership, and self-possession."

Chelsea Steiner of The Mary Sue asserted, "Emma Frost is such a compelling character because of her complexity and her unique qualities as a female character. She doesn't care about her likeability, and possesses powers beyond her mutations. Frost is highly intelligent, witty, resourceful and very wealthy. She is Bruce Wayne with telepathic abilities. She's James Bond with diamond skin. And unlike many female mutants, she is not ashamed or afraid of her own powers. She is a self-possessed and confident leader. After all, not many mutants would be just as comfortable leading the Hellfire Club as the do the X-Men. Frost is also in control of her sexuality, displaying sex positivity before the term even entered the lexicon. She's romanced Cyclops, Tony Stark, and Namor, to name a few. This characteristic is a natural extension of Frost's confidence and strong sense of self. She knows who she is and will not apologize for it. Her rich character history and skill set show that she could star in countless different films. She could headline an Atomic Blonde-style retro spy film. She could star in a violent revenge film based on the fallout from Genosha. Hell, I would even watch her in a superpowered reboot of The Prime of Miss Jean Brodie starring her and the Stepford Cuckoos. There is so much to explore with Emma Frost, a character who deserves her own damn franchise."

Deirdre Kaye of Scary Mommy called Emma Frost a "role model" and a "truly heroic" female character.

Claire Napier of WomenWriteAboutComics said, "Emma Frost is remarkable because nobody—fan nor creator nor Marvel management—will ever say, "No, you are wrong for thinking that this character has been designed to imply eroticism." She's not a perfect construct, but she's something of a relief. At least, at last, we can talk about it. That's probably why Grant Morrison put her front and centre in his New X-Men. In superhero comics—which he loves to remind us are about muscular men and large-breasted ladies in spandex and latex punching each other through walls—Emma Frost is established as a mouthpiece for those who would sit at the back, whispering, "Isn't this all a bit rude? Where are everybody's sexy bits?" Here they are! They're on Emma. She is our erotic scapegoat."

John Witiw of Comic Book Resources called Emma Frost an "iconic" character.

Jesse Schedeen of IGN included Emma Frost in their "Marvel's Femme Fatales" list, while Hilary Goldstein and Richard George ranked her 21st in their "Top 25 X-Men" list. Comics Buyer's Guide ranked Emma Frost 5th in their "100 Sexiest Women in Comics" list. Anthony Orlando of Digital Trends ranked Emma Frost 5th in their "10 Most Powerful X-Men Villains" list. George Marston of Newsarama ranked Emma Frost 11th in their "Best X-Men Members Of All Time" list, saying, "As many of the best X-Men do, Emma Frost started out as a villain." Jo-Anne Rowney of Daily Mirror ranked Emma Frost 12th in their "Best Female Superheroes Of All Time" list, writing, "Step aside for this iconic lady, not only a complicated ice queen and staple of the X-Men comics, but she's also just a straight up badass. Her fashion is always over the top, and makes a statement, but it's all part of her image. She may have only been in less than half of the X-Men movies (shame on you guys), but she's flying the flag for female superheroes everywhere." Darren Franich of Entertainment Weekly ranked Emma Frost 16th in their "Let's Rank Every X-Man Ever" list, calling her a "cruel beauty who became an occasionally-heroic cruel beauty."

=== Accolades ===
- In 2006, Spike Scream Awards nominated Emma Frost for Best Rack on the Rack.

== Literary reception ==
=== Volumes ===
==== Emma Frost - 2003 ====
According to Diamond Comic Distributors, Emma Frost #1 was the 26th best selling comic in July 2003.

==== X-Men Origins: Emma Frost - 2010 ====
According to Diamond Comic Distributors, X-Men Origins: Emma Frost #1 was the 101st best selling comic book of May 2010.

==== X-Men Black: Emma Frost - 2018 ====
According to Diamond Comic Distributors, X-Men Black: Emma Frost #1 was the 23rd best selling comic book in October 2018. X-Men Black: Emma Frost #1 was the 226th best selling comic book in 2018.

Matt Lune of Comic Book Resources found that X-Men Black: Emma Frost #1 "brings Emma Frost back into the spotlight, and raises her power level higher than ever," asserting, "From Genosha to Scott Summers, Emma Frost has lost a lot, but the biggest thing she has lost is perhaps herself. Here, in this issue, she finds herself again, and in doing so, fans have rediscovered a newly refreshed and re-energized version of a beloved X-Men mainstay. It's hard not to spoil anything about the end of this issue, but Emma's decision regarding her new title is so perfectly relevant for 2018 in a way that doesn't scream at you but is still so provocative, so exciting and so very Emma Frost." Jamie Lovett of ComicBook.com gave X-Men Black: Emma Frost #1 a grade of 4 out of 5, writing, "Of all of the issues of X-Men Black, this Emma Frost issue does the most to progress its title character in a new and interesting direction. That's no small feat considering the moral morass that Emma was dropped into thanks to an unearned villain turn way back during IvX. Other writers have been quick to try to redeem her, but arguably too quick considering how drastic and vile her actions were. Luckily, Leah Williams seem to have a total and complete understanding of Emma's personality and values and knows exactly which way her moral compass should be pointing. Rather than try to redeem Emma or reduce her to a simple villain, Williams has Emma walk her own path, making use of her gifts in intelligent and subtle ways to position herself a major player in the mutant world. She's joined by Chris Bachalo, one of the all-time great X-Men artists, for this story. While Bachalo's signature sense of design and unorthodox framing techniques are intact, he has a small army of inkers and colorists assisting him. As a result, this isn't Bachalo's sharpest-looking work, and there are some inconsistencies within, but it is still some stellar-looking comics. It can not be emphasized enough how essential this issue is for anyone with a soft spot for Emma, and its plenty enjoyable for everyone else as well."

==== Giant-Size X-Men: Jean Grey and Emma Frost - 2020 ====
According to Diamond Comic Distributors, Giant Size X-Men: Jean Grey and Emma Frost #1 was the 5th best selling comic book in February 2020. Giant Size X-Men: Jean Grey and Emma Frost #1 was the 26th best selling comic book in 2020.

Mike Fugere of Comic Book Resources called Giant Size X-Men: Jean Grey and Emma Frost #1 "another arcane, beautiful chapter to the Dawn of X era," writing, "Giant-Size X-Men: Jean Grey and Emma Frost #1 is an obvious tribute to an issue of Grant Morrison and Frank Quitely's iconic run on New X-Men, but its tone is far less psychedelic and far more ethereal. There is a sense of peace throughout Storm's mind, despite the horrific revelation that's discovered by the end of the issue. How the various emotional avatars within our Omega-Level mutant's mind interact with Jean and Emma are probably the most compelling part of this issue from a storytelling standpoint. It does a wonderful job at expressing emotions that are not always openly expressed between characters with conflicting ideologies with humor and a wonderful sense of whimsy." Matthew Aguilar of ComicBook.com stated, "This story is a joy from beginning to end, but it also subtly hints at larger ramifications for not only Storm but every other mutant on the planet. Macro-level ideas regarding the soul, mutant resurrection, and the state of the mind are all explored in one way or another—anchored by the imminent danger to one of the X-Men's most iconic faces, and it makes for one very compelling mix. Whether you're looking for an entertaining adventure between two of your X-Men favorites, a thoughtful and action-packed journey through the mind, or another step forward in the evolution fo [sic] the X-Men, you'll find all of it in Giant Size X-Men: Jean Grey and Emma Frost #1. It is one of the most stunning one-shots on the market today. In short, don't miss out on this issue; you'll regret it."

== Other versions ==
=== Age of Apocalypse ===
An alternate version of Emma Frost appears in the Age of Apocalypse storyline. This version is a member of the Human High Council who had the portions of her brain that granted her telepathy removed to join the ranks of the council. It is later revealed that the lobotomy only temporarily removed Frost's powers. When her powers return, Frost joins in Weapon Omega's reign, later becoming queen of Latveria.

=== Amazing Spider-Man: Renew Your Vows ===
An alternate version of Emma Frost appears in Amazing Spider-Man: Renew Your Vows as a member of the Brotherhood of Mutants.

=== Days of Future Past ===
An alternate version of Emma Frost appears in Days of Future Past storyline. This version is the former White Queen of the Hellfire Club, but retreated to a technological base off the coast of India after a majority of the mutant population was wiped out. Frost is later recruited by Jubilee and Magneto to save Wolverine.

=== Earth-889 ===
An alternate version of Emma Frost appears on Earth-889. This version is the leader of the X-Society, a group that works with the New Albion police in investigation. Frost consistently refuses Cyclops's proposals of marriage citing class differences and her desire to avoid a scandal. During an investigation of parallel events of those in Astonishing X-Men's Earth-616, the X-Society pursue Subject X, who causes the Hindenburg disaster and the X-Society are blamed for the deaths of its passengers. In response, the government places the X-Society under house arrest, causing Frost to consider moving away to Europe and accepting Cyclops's offer of marriage.

Frost is among the mutants who are captured by a deluded version of Charles Xavier known as Savior. The mutants are used as living batteries to keep Savior's Earth from breaking apart, a process which eventually kills Cyclops. Frost and the remaining alternate reality X-Men escape from the machine and join the captured Earth-616 Cyclops in stopping Savior.

=== Exiles ===
An alternate version of Emma Frost appears in a reality visited by the Exiles where Warlock's techno-organic biology interacted with the Legacy Virus and transformed 75% of Earth's population to turn into techno-organic beings known as Vi-Locks. The remaining heroes, led by Frost, band together to fight the Vi-Locks and find a cure.

=== House of M ===
An alternate version of Emma Frost appears in the House of M storyline. This version is a child therapist and is married to Scott Summers.

=== Marvel Adventures ===
An alternate version of Emma Frost appears in Marvel Adventures Spider-Man. She is the best friend of mutant Sophia Sanduval, also known as Chat, and mostly uses her powers for personal gains. She is also one of the few people who knows Peter Parker's identity as Spider-Man and grows interested in him. She uses her telepathic powers and takes on the alias The Silencer to see what Peter is capable of.

=== Marvel Noir ===
An alternate version of Emma Frost appears in Marvel Noir universe. This version is the warden of Genosha Bay, a prison where sociopaths are held without trial or due process.

=== New Exiles ===
An alternate version of Emma Frost appears in New Exiles. This version is the head of Britain's Department X and founder of Force-X.

=== Old Man Logan ===
An alternate version of Emma Frost appears on Earth-807128/Old Man Logan. She marries Doctor Doom to ensure the survival of her species. Together with Doctor Doom, they rule a sector of what once was the United States of America called Doom's Lair, the only place on Earth where mutants can live without fear of persecution.

=== Secret Wars ===
An alternate version of Emma Frost dubbed "Boss Frost" appears as a psychic law enforcement officer in the Mondo City region of Battleworld.

=== Powerless ===
An alternate version of Emma Frost appears in Powerless, a world without superpowers or superheroes. She appears as one of William Watts' therapy patients. She mentions having issues with her mother, as well as being upset about Scott choosing Jean over her.

=== Prelude to Deadpool Corps ===
An alternate version of Emma Frost appears in the Prelude to Deadpool Corps series. This version is the head of an orphanage for girls and is pursued romantically by Professor X, who runs an orphanage for troubled children. During a dance hosted by both facilities, Xavier tries but fails to win Frost's affection.

=== Ruins ===
An alternate version of Emma Frost appears in Ruins. This version is the high priestess/manageress of the Church of the Next Generation, where she legally adopts the children of her followers and has them undergo surgery to unlock their "psychic abilities."

=== Ultimate Marvel ===
An alternate version of Emma Frost appears in the Ultimate Marvel imprint. This version is a former student, and girlfriend, of Professor Charles Xavier, head of the Academy of Tomorrow, and a secret member of the Hellfire Club. In the Ultimatum storyline, Frost is killed by Magneto's forces.

=== Ultimate Universe ===
In the Ultimate Universe, Emma Frost is the White Queen of the Hellfire Club and subservient to Black King Emmanuel da Costa. Frost later turns against da Costa by shutting down parts of his brain and allows da Costa's son Roberto to kill him. Frost assumes leadership of the Hellfire Club.

=== What If? Astonishing X-Men ===
An alternate version of Emma Frost appears in the 2010 What If? Astonishing X-Men one-shot "What if Ord resurrected Jean Grey instead of Colossus?." Jean Grey's resurrection causes friction with Frost, who believes her presence and history with the Phoenix will ensure the X-Men's demise. The two women discover that Breakworld has predicted Phoenix will destroy their planet. Under the deception of the psychic remnant of Cassandra Nova, Frost extracts hidden vestiges of the Phoenix Force from the remaining Stepford Cuckoos, killing them and granting her the powers of the Phoenix so she may free Cassandra from her prison, no longer requiring Shadowcat. Frost kills Ord, destroys Breakworld, and confronts the X-Men, killing Beast. Frost reveals her fear that Jean will proceed to take everything—including Scott—away from her now that she has returned. S.W.O.R.D. intercedes and intends to kill Frost for the destruction of Breakworld. Jean realizes that it is actually Nova controlling Frost. Scott manages to reach Frost with his love and she gains enough control to allow the X-Men a chance to kill her and stop Nova. Shadowcat pulls out Frost's heart, but is also killed when the Phoenix Force explodes from Frost's body.

=== X-Campus ===
An alternate version of Emma Frost appears in the X-Campus series. This version is a teenager, student at the Worthington Academy, and girlfriend of Sebastian Shaw.

=== Young X-Men "End of Days" ===
An alternate version of Emma Frost appears in a dystopic future depicted in the final two issues of Young X-Men. An aged Frost, known as Diamondheart, is one of only four remaining mutants on "Xaviera", a former mutant safe-haven independent state and utopia. She remains on a team of X-Men with Graymalkin, Wolverine, Anole, and Ink. Dust suddenly appears, now greatly changed in her appearance and persona with altered powers, and proceeds to confront and easily kill each member. Frost attempts to fight her, but is suffocated by Dust.

== In other media ==
=== Television ===
Emma Frost as she appears in Wolverine and the X-Men.

- Emma Frost / White Queen appears in X-Men: Pryde of the X-Men, voiced by Susan Silo. This version is a member of the Brotherhood of Mutant Terrorists who possesses the ability to fly and create "psy-bolts", alternatively known as "psionic energy spears" or "psychic harpoons".
- Emma Frost / White Queen appears in X-Men: The Animated Series, voiced by Cynthia Dale. This version is a member of the Inner Circle who possesses a Cerebro-esque machine that enhances her abilities, allowing her to block psychic probes. While helping the Inner Circle Club manipulate Jean Grey into joining them, the Phoenix Force emerges, leading to Frost escaping in the confusion.
  - Emma Frost appears in the sequel series, X-Men '97, voiced by Martha Marion in the first season and by Zehra Fazal in the second season. In Remember It, she has relocated to Genosha and serves as a key member within that government's ruling nation. Amidst a Sentinel attack, her secondary diamond form manifests itself, which helps her survive until she is rescued by the X-Men. In A Force to Be Reckoned With, she supplies X-Force with information regarding the last known whereabouts of Apocalypse, only to double cross the team into a trap led by X-Factor.
- Emma Frost appears in Generation X, portrayed by Finola Hughes. This version is a headmaster of Xavier's School for Gifted Youngsters who possesses a minor degree of telekinesis.
- Emma Frost appears in Wolverine and the X-Men, voiced by Kari Wahlgren. This version is a member of the Inner Circle who works undercover within the X-Men to locate Jean Grey and extract the Phoenix Force from her under the belief that doing so will save humanity. Upon learning that the Inner Circle wish to use the Phoenix Force for their own gain, Frost sacrifices herself to release it into space.
- Emma Frost appears in Marvel Anime: X-Men, voiced by Kaori Yamagata in the Japanese version and by Ali Hillis in the English dub. This version is a former member of the Inner Circle who left for moral reasons and to educate mutant children.

=== Film ===
- Emma Frost was originally meant to appear in director Bryan Singer's third X-Men film, portrayed by Sigourney Weaver. After Singer left the project, Frost was not carried over to the final film X-Men: The Last Stand.
- Emma Frost served as an inspiration for a character in X-Men Origins: Wolverine, portrayed by Tahyna Tozzi. She is Kayla Silverfox's sister, who displays the ability to transmute her skin into a diamond-esque form. While a trailer for the film identified the character as Emma Frost, she was credited as "Kayla's sister/Emma" in the final film.
- Emma Frost / White Queen appears in X-Men: First Class, portrayed by January Jones. This version is a member of the Hellfire Club and consort to the group's leader Sebastian Shaw. Following her introduction, producer Lauren Shuler Donner identified her as the "real" Emma Frost and unconnected to the similarly named character from X-Men Origins: Wolverine. While carrying out their plot to create a mutant-based new world order, the Hellfire Club run afoul of Charles Xavier, Erik Lehnsherr, and the future X-Men. Following Shaw's death, Frost is incarcerated and later freed by Lehnsherr.
- X-Men: Days of Future Past revealed Emma Frost as one of several mutants who were captured, tortured, experimented on, and killed by Bolivar Trask.
- Emma Frost was originally meant to appear in Dark Phoenix, but was cut from the film.
- Emma Frost will appear in the Marvel Cinematic Universe, portrayed by Samara Weaving.

=== Video games ===
- Emma Frost / White Queen appears as a boss in The Uncanny X-Men.
- Emma Frost / White Queen appears as a boss in X-Men: Madness in Murderworld.
- Emma Frost / White Queen appears as a boss in X-Men.
- Emma Frost appears as a playable character in X-Men Legends, voiced by Bobby Holliday.
- Emma Frost appears as a non-playable character in X-Men Legends II: Rise of Apocalypse, voiced again by Bobby Holliday.
- Emma Frost appears as a playable character in Marvel Super Hero Squad Online, voiced by Grey DeLisle.
- Emma Frost appears as a non-playable character in X-Men: Destiny, voiced by Kari Wahlgren.
- Emma Frost appears as an unlockable character in Marvel Avengers Alliance. Additionally, her Phoenix Force-empowered form appears as an alternate skin.
- Emma Frost appears as a playable character in Marvel Heroes, voiced again by Kari Wahlgren.
- Emma Frost appears as a playable character in Lego Marvel Super Heroes, voiced again by Kari Wahlgren. This version is an associate of the X-Men.
- Emma Frost appears as a playable character in Marvel Future Fight.
- Emma Frost appears as a playable character in Marvel Puzzle Quest.
- Emma Frost appears as a playable character in Marvel Contest of Champions.
- Emma Frost appears as a playable character in Marvel Super War.
- Two variants of Emma Frost appear as playable characters in Marvel Strike Force. One is based on her appearance as part of the Hellfire Club while the other is based on her appearance as a member of the X-Men.
- Emma Frost / White Queen appears in Marvel Snap.
- Emma Frost appears as an unlockable cosmetic item and boss in Fortnite.
- Emma Frost appears as a playable character in Marvel Rivals, voiced by Laura Post.
- Emma Frost appears as a playable character in the tactical mobile RPG Marvel Mystic Mayhem, voiced by Cristina Vee.

=== Merchandise ===
Emma Frost received action figures in Hasbro's Marvel Legends action figure line in 2007, 2013, 2019, 2020, 2022, 2025, and 2026.

=== Miscellaneous ===
- Emma Frost appears in the Astonishing X-Men motion comic, initially voiced by Erica Schroeder and later by Lara Gilchrist.
- Emma Frost appears in the Wolverine versus Sabretooth motion comic, voiced by Heather Doerksen.
- Emma Frost, inspired by the Old Man Logan incarnation, appears in Marvel's Wastelanders: Old Man Star-Lord, voiced by Vanessa Williams.

== Collected editions ==
Title	Material collected	Publication date	ISBN
Emma Frost Ultimate Collection	Emma Frost #1–18	May 2011	978-0785155102
X-Men Origins: The Complete Collection	X-Men Origins: Emma Frost and X-Men Origins: Colossus, Jean Grey, Beast, Wolverine, Sabretooth, Gambit, Cyclops, Nightcrawler, Iceman, Deadpool	August 2018	978-1302912208
X-Men: Black	X-Men: Black - Emma Frost and X-Men: Black - Magneto, X-Men: Black - Mystique, X-Men: Black - Juggernaut, X-Men: Black - Mojo	March 2019	978-1302915537
Giant-Size X-Men By Jonathan Hickman	Giant-Size X-Men: Jean Grey and Emma Frost #1 and Giant-Size X-Men: Magneto #1, Nightcrawler #1, Fantomex #1, Storm #1	January 2021	978-1302925833
Emma Frost: The White Queen - All Hail the Queen	Emma Frost: The White Queen #1–5	February 2026	978-1302966256
