= Nate Grey =

Fictional mutant superhero in Marvel Comics

Nathaniel "Nate" Grey X-Man
- Cover art of The New Mutants (vol. 3) #25 (July 2011). Art by Jorge Molina.

Publication information
- Publisher: Marvel Comics
- First appearance: X-Man #1 (March 1995)
- Created by: Jeph Loeb (writer); Steve Skroce (artist) (based upon the character Cable by Chris Claremont, Louise Simonson, and Rob Liefeld)

In-story information
- Full name: Nathaniel "Nate" Grey
- Species: Human mutant
- Team affiliations: Horsemen of Salvation; Brotherhood of Mutants; New Mutants; X-Men; Outcasts
- Partnerships: Madelyne Pryor; Threnody
- Notable aliases: 19X; Shaman of the Mutant Tribe; X-Man
- Abilities: Ability to exist incorporeal as living psychic energy; Omnipotent psychic powers which are most commonly used for: Telekinesis; Telepathy; Teleportation; Energy and matter manipulation; Reality warping; Psychometry; Precognition; Retrocognition; Astral projection; Intangibility; Cross-dimensional travel; Cyberpathy; Power manipulation; Chronokinesis

Nathaniel "Nate" Grey (X-Man) is a superhero appearing in American comic books published by Marvel Comics, commonly in association with the X-Men. Created by writer Jeph Loeb and artist Steve Skroce, the character first appeared in X-Man #1 (March 1995).

X-Man is an alternate version of the regular Marvel Universe hero Cable, hailing from the alternate timeline Earth-295, first established in the "Age of Apocalypse" storyline. He is the biological son of his dimension's Scott Summers and Jean Grey, born of genetic tampering by Mr. Sinister. His first name is derived from his creator's (Mr. Sinister's) real name, Nathaniel Essex, and his last name from his genetic mother, Jean Grey. Due to not being infected by a techno-organic virus, as Cable was, Nate achieved vast telepathic and telekinetic powers (reflecting those that Cable would have had without the virus), and was one of the most powerful mutants in existence during his lifetime.

X-Man was originally a mini-series replacing Cable during 1995's "Age of Apocalypse" alternate reality storyline. After that storyline ended, Marvel transported Nate Grey to Earth-616, the primary shared universe in which most Marvel Comics are set. The series ran until 2001, during which Nate struggled with adjusting to a strange and foreign world, while being the most powerful person in this selfsame world. The series ended with his seemingly sacrificial death.

Despite his name, X-Man was only briefly a member of the X-Men, both in the Age of Apocalypse reality and on Earth-616. Initially, the character was referred to only by his real name, both in "Age of Apocalypse" and on Earth-616. Shortly before the "Onslaught" storyline, Nate began to be sporadically referred to as X-Man, without explanation for the in-universe origin of the code name.

== Publication history ==
Nate Grey first appeared in an eponymous four-issue miniseries in 1995 written by Jeph Loeb and drawn by Steve Skroce. Afterward, the character starred in a self-titled ongoing series. When sales began to wane in 2000, the series was revamped by Warren Ellis as part of the Revolution event beginning with issue 64 with Nate under the name of Shaman. The new direction was unsuccessful, and X-Man was canceled at issue 75 in 2001.

The character returned during the 2008 - 09 "Dark Reign" storyline, appearing in the miniseries Dark X-Men. He was also featured in New Mutants (vol. 3) #25-50.

== Fictional character biography ==
=== Age of Apocalypse ===
Nate Grey from his first appearance in X-Man #1

Nate Grey originates from the parallel reality known as the Age of Apocalypse, where he was created by Mister Sinister using genetic material from Cyclops and Phoenix (Jean Grey). Sinister intended for Nate to be the ultimate mutant and to use him against Apocalypse.

Cyclops frees Nate during a raid on Sinister's base, not knowing his relation to him. Nate is taken in by Forge and taught to control his powers, becoming determined to bring down Apocalypse. After Sinister kills Forge, Nate confronts him to avenge Forge's death. Sinister allows Nate to read his mind, revealing Nate's origin to him. Nate later battles Holocaust and stabs him with a shard of the M'Kraan Crystal, causing them both to vanish.

=== A New World ===
Nate and Holocaust are transported to Earth-616, with Nate arriving in Switzerland. Madelyne Pryor helps Nate adjust to this reality, but they are separated soon after by Selene. Nate wanders Earth alone, encountering many who either desire to use his power or genuinely want to help him, only for Nate's own suspicious nature to prompt him to drive them away.

Nate meets Threnody, one of Sinister's underlings seeking freedom. After rescuing her from the Marauders, the pair form a mutually beneficial partnership: Nate provides protection, while Threnody acts as his guide to the world. Threnody eventually leaves Nate, unwilling to answer questions about her past. Soon afterward, Nate turns down Jean Grey's offer to contact the X-Men and discovers that his telekinesis is gone. Nate visits Moira MacTaggert for answers, which she provides: Nate still has powers, but is suppressing them. Havok appears as Nate is leaving and invites him to join the Brotherhood of Mutants. Havok helps Nate regain his telekinesis to the point where he can fly again.

Nate's time in New York is marked by near-endless conflict and his powers spiraling out of control. He is attacked by the psychotic killer Jackknife, a remnant of the Abomination's followers. Nate himself unknowingly unlocked Jackknife's latent potential in the past, and though Jackknife proves immune to Nate's abilities, Nate manages to defeat him, earning the favor of many citizens who witness the battle. Nate thwarts a terrorist attack, but when lives are still lost, his admirers turn on him. Nate learns that the one responsible for his fast rise to and fall from fame, is Purple Man, who has been controlling Nate and the citizens with his pheromones. Nate resists being controlled and tries to erase all memories of himself from the minds of New Yorkers. Spider-Man intervenes and convinces Nate not to go through with his plan.

=== Shaman to the Mutant Tribe ===
An alternate universe version of Jean Grey, after being cast from her native reality, takes the form of a resurrected Madelyne Pryor. She forms a romance with Nate, teaches him to shift between parallel universes and has him take her to her home universe. Grey intends to use Nate's vast power to help her rule her Earth, but Nate refuses. Nate also meets his counterpart from Grey's universe, who is significantly weaker than him. The alternate Nate stabilizes Nate's powers, giving him a black X-shaped tattoo on his chest similar to his own.

After defeating Grey, Nate sets out to make a difference in the world and considers himself a Mutant Shaman, a teaching he embraced from the alternate version of himself. Nate has few qualms about using his power to mete out justice for fellow mutants. Later on, Nate confronts the Anti-Man, an alien who intends to infuse his genetic code into all living cells on the planet. To save the world from destruction, Nate merged himself with the Anti-Man, in essence "poisoning" the cells of Earth with his presence, and dissipating them both.

=== Return ===
Nate resurfaces in a small town, where his presence causes several of the inhabitants to dreamwalk and continuously repeat "I'm an X-Man." Norman Osborn sends Mimic, Weapon Omega, Dark Beast, and Mystique, to investigate and to raise public opinion. As Osborn's X-Men investigate, both Mimic and Omega are overwhelmed with Nate's energies and go on a rampage, leaving Mystique and Dark Beast alone with a patient that they were examining.

Nate angrily attacks Beast but does not realize that Jean is actually Mystique, who distracts him long enough to save Dark Beast's life. Following this incident, Osborn tasks his X-Men to hunt down and possibly capture Nate for experimentation. Mimic drags Nate into another plane of existence. After a short conversation, they are confronted by Ares, who has followed them and is overjoyed to have an opponent such as Nate. Ares overpowers Nate, who disappears in a flash of light.

Unbeknown to the Dark X-Men, Nate has possessed Osborn's body, something that only Mystique notices. After trying and failing to persuade Nate to remove the tech in her body which is rigged to explode should she betray Osborn, she recruits the rest of the Dark X-Men to invade Osborn's mind and to confront Nate. While Nate and Osborn are engaged in a battle of wills, Osborn gloats that he and Nate are evenly matched.

Osborn forces Mimic to replicate Omega's powers, turning the pair into a powerful siphon that drains Nate's energies. Now returned to the physical world, a powerless Nate is tortured in front of the Dark X-Men as an example to them.

=== Rescue Mission ===
Learning that Nate Grey had returned to the living, Cyclops reorganizes the New Mutants roster under Danielle Moonstar's leadership and tells them to find Nate and bring him home. Nate is found in an abandoned H.A.M.M.E.R. facility, where he is being held by Sugar Man. Sugar Man has Nate hooked up into the Omega Machine, a device built by Norman Osborn to open portals to other realities. Realizing that the only way Sugar Man will leave him alone is to give him what he wants, Nate uses all of his strength and willpower to open a portal to his home reality. Before Sugar Man can escape into it, he is defeated by the New Mutants. Nate reveals that he burnt out most of his powers while opening Sugar Man's portal, leaving him with only telekinesis.

After suffering a series of nightmares, Cypher convinces the team to visit Paradise Island, the place where he was killed. Nate questions Cypher's mental stability, which leads to Danielle Moonstar insulting Nate's diminished powers. While Nate admits that he could still only pick up with telekinesis what he could lift physically, he later demonstrated his new method of telekinetic attack when the team came under attack from the island's Ani-Mates. By focusing his telekinesis into the shape of an X, Nate was able to target his power more precisely. The trip proved to be worthwhile when they discovered a plot by the Ani-Mator to resurrect himself. Nate's mutant abilities steadily return, allowing him to use his telepathy in small doses.

Nate's knowledge and familiarity of alternate universes helps the New Mutants when they are transported to an alternate universe where Cypher permanently merged with Warlock. When the X-Men and Avengers go to war over how to handle the Phoenix Force, Nate fights bravely on the front lines; first to protect Hope Summers and then to defend Cyclops' utopian rule.

Matthew Rosenberg confirmed that Nate went on to travel through Europe on a soul-searching journey in response to a fan's comments on Twitter. He later went on to admit that his earlier statement was a joke and has since said that Nate is a mystery, he "vanishes, maybe he'll come back at some point?"

== Powers and abilities ==
Nate Grey is an Omega-level mutant with immense psychic abilities. He can use his telepathy to read and control multiple minds at once and even read residual thought imprints left on objects touched by people (psychometry), communicate with others by broadcasting his thoughts, create illusions by altering the perceptions of others, fire psionic blasts that scramble an opponent's thought processes, and project his mind into the astral plane.

Nate's telekinesis allows him to move massive objects with his mind, fire blasts of psychokinetic energy that can shatter steel, create mental barriers, and fly at supersonic speeds. He is powerful enough to single handedly defeat Tundra of the Great Beasts and was even able to psionically isolate the planet's gravitational pull on the two other Great Beasts, Tolomaq and Somon. His control over his telekinesis was so acute that he was able to create holograms by mentally manipulating water, molecules and dust to refract light, bend security lasers to avoid detection, and even move the atoms of a wall around his form so that he passed through the wall like a ghost. He was also able to use his telekinesis to bend the Earth's magnetic field and create electromagnetic pulses. His telekinesis extended to at least a molecular level, and he could imbue himself with super human physical attributes by focusing his telekinesis inwards.

After his brief return from his dimensional travels that equipped him with a special genetic dampener that would eventually prevent his powers from killing him, Nate displayed further abilities, which included the power to view and traverse higher planes of existence, to reconstitute his body from astral energy in a similar manner as Onslaught and to transform his physical body back into astral energy. Though not a real teleporter, he then could traverse alternate realities by breaking the barriers between universes and once 'teleported' multiple people all over an alternate version of New York into another dimension. Since he was able to connect any point in one dimension with any point in the dimension he was in at the moment, he could theoretically also use this to cross vast interstellar distances by traveling back and forth.

Nate lost much of his powers after opening Sugar Man's portal, thus burning them out. He later regained his powers from a Life Speed, elevating him to a power level beyond omega-level.

== Reception ==
- In 2014, Entertainment Weekly ranked X-Man/Nate Grey 99th in their "Let's rank every X-Man ever" list.
- In 2018, CBR.com ranked X-Man 19th in their "Age Of Apocalypse: The 30 Strongest Characters In Marvel's Coolest Alternate World" list.

== Relationship to Cable ==
Nate Grey is the counterpart of Cable, though their early lives differ greatly. Nate was grown in a laboratory in an alternate dimension by Mr. Sinister from the genes of Scott and Jean, and Cable was born to Scott and Madelyne Pryor, a clone of Jean Grey also created by Sinister. Nate and Cable have identical psychic profiles, resulting in a painful feedback to both parties when they are in close proximity to each other. However, Nate is much more powerful than Cable, as Cable devotes much of his power to hold off his techno-organic virus.

The juxtaposition of the two characters allowed writers to address issues of identity and nature versus nurture and explore the complex nature of family relationships in the X-Men's world.

== Other versions ==
=== Shaman ===
The Nate Grey of Earth-2098 was transported to Earth-998. Nate's mind is damaged and he goes mad. Grey seemingly kills Nate, who manages to escape. Eight years later, Nate encounters the main version of Nate Grey and helps him escape from Grey. Nate uses his powers to stabilize X-Man's powers, gives him his X-Gene insignia, and sends him to Earth-616. Believing him to be the Nate Grey of Earth-295, Grey's follower Scratch captures Nate and takes him to Grey, who kills him.

=== Nate Xavier ===
On Earth-253, Nate Xavier is a member of the People's Protectorate. Nate and his universe were destroyed by the entity Qabiri.

=== Earth-9997 ===
In Earth-9997 (the setting of Earth X) Grey become Stryfe, battles Cable and is killed while trying to protect Madelyne Pryor.

=== What If? ===
In the alternate Age of Apocalypse depicted in What If? X-Men Age of Apocalypse, both Professor X and Magneto are killed when Legion travels back in time. This version of Nate is the biological son of Scott Summers and Jean Grey and grew up in the Savage Land. After Apocalypse attacks the Savage Land and kills all of its residents, Nate attempts to travel back in time to stop Legion's initial attack, but is killed by Captain America.

== In other media ==
- X-Man appears in the PSP version of X-Men Legends II: Rise of Apocalypse, voiced by Quinton Flynn.
- X-Man appears in the VS System and OverPower trading card games.

== Collected editions ==
Title	Material collected	Publication date	ISBN
X-Men: The Complete Age of Apocalypse Epic Book 1	X-Man #-1, X-Man Annual '96, X-Men Chronicles #1-2, Tales from the Age of Apocalypse: By the Light, Tales from the Age of Apocalypse: Sinister Bloodlines, Blink #1-4	May 3, 2006	0785117148
X-Men: The Complete Age of Apocalypse Epic Book 2	X-Man #1, X-Men: Alpha, Age of Apocalypse: The Chosen, Generation Next #1, Astonishing X-Men #1, X-Calibre #1, Gambit and the X-Ternals #1-2, Weapon X #1-2, Amazing X-Men #1-2, and Factor X #1-2	August 9, 2006	0785122648
X-Men: The Complete Age of Apocalypse Epic Book 3	X-Man #2-3, X-Calibre #2-3, Astonishing X-Men #2-4, Generation Next #2-3, Factor X #3, Amazing X-Men #3, Weapon X #3, Gambit and the X-Ternals #3 and X-Universe #1	April 19, 2006	0785120513
X-Men: The Complete Age of Apocalypse Epic Book 4	X-Man #4 and 53-54, Generation Next #4, X-Calibre #4, Factor X #4, Gambit and the X-Ternals #4, Amazing X-Men #4, Weapon X #4, X-Universe #2, X-Men: Omega, Blink #4, X-Men: Prime (only the last three pages of Blink #4)	November 15, 2006	0785120521
X-Man: The Man Who Fell to Earth	X-Man #5-14, Excalibur #95 and Cable #29-31	July 4, 2012	978-0785159810
X-Men: Prelude to Onslaught	X-Man #15-17; X-Men (vol. 2) #50; The Uncanny X-Men #333; Cable #32-33	March 2010	978-0785144632
X-Men: The Complete Onslaught Epic Vol. 2	X-Man #18; Excalibur #100; Fantastic Four #415; The Amazing Spider-Man #415; Sensational Spider-Man #8; Spider-Man #72; Green Goblin #12; Punisher (vol. 3) #11; X-Factor #125-126; Wolverine (vol. 2) #104; X-Man #17; X-Men (vol. 2) #55; The Uncanny X-Men #336; X-Force #58	June 2008	0-7851-2824-7
X-Men: The Complete Onslaught Epic Vol. 3	X-Man #19; The Avengers #402; The Incredible Hulk (vol. 2) #445; Iron Man #332; Thor #502; Wolverine (vol. 2) #105; Cable #35; X-Men (vol. 2) #55; The Uncanny X-Men #336; X-Force #57	August 2008	0-7851-2825-5
X-Man: Dance with the Devil	X-Man #20-29; Annual '96'; The Amazing Spider-Man #420	January 2013	0-7851-6289-5
X-Men: Operation Zero Tolerance	X-Man #30; The Uncanny X-Men #346, Generation X #26–31, X-Force #67–70, X-Men (vol. 2) 65–70, Wolverine (vol. 2) #115–118, Cable #45–47	August 2012	978-0785162407
X-Men vs. Apocalypse Vol. 1: The Twelve	X-Man #59-60, Cable #75-76, The Uncanny X-Men #376-377, Wolverine (vol. 2) #146-147, X-Men (vol. 2) #96-97	March 19, 2008	0-7851-2263-X
Counter X (X-Man) Vol. 3	X-Man #63-70	Nov 19, 2008	0785133062
Counter X: X-Man: Fearful Symmetry	X-Man #71-75, material from X-Men Unlimited #31: This volume was solicited for release, but was cancelled in March 2013 before being published.	April 23, 2013	978-0785167310
