= Richard Bennett Lamas =

Uruguayan artist

Richard Bennett
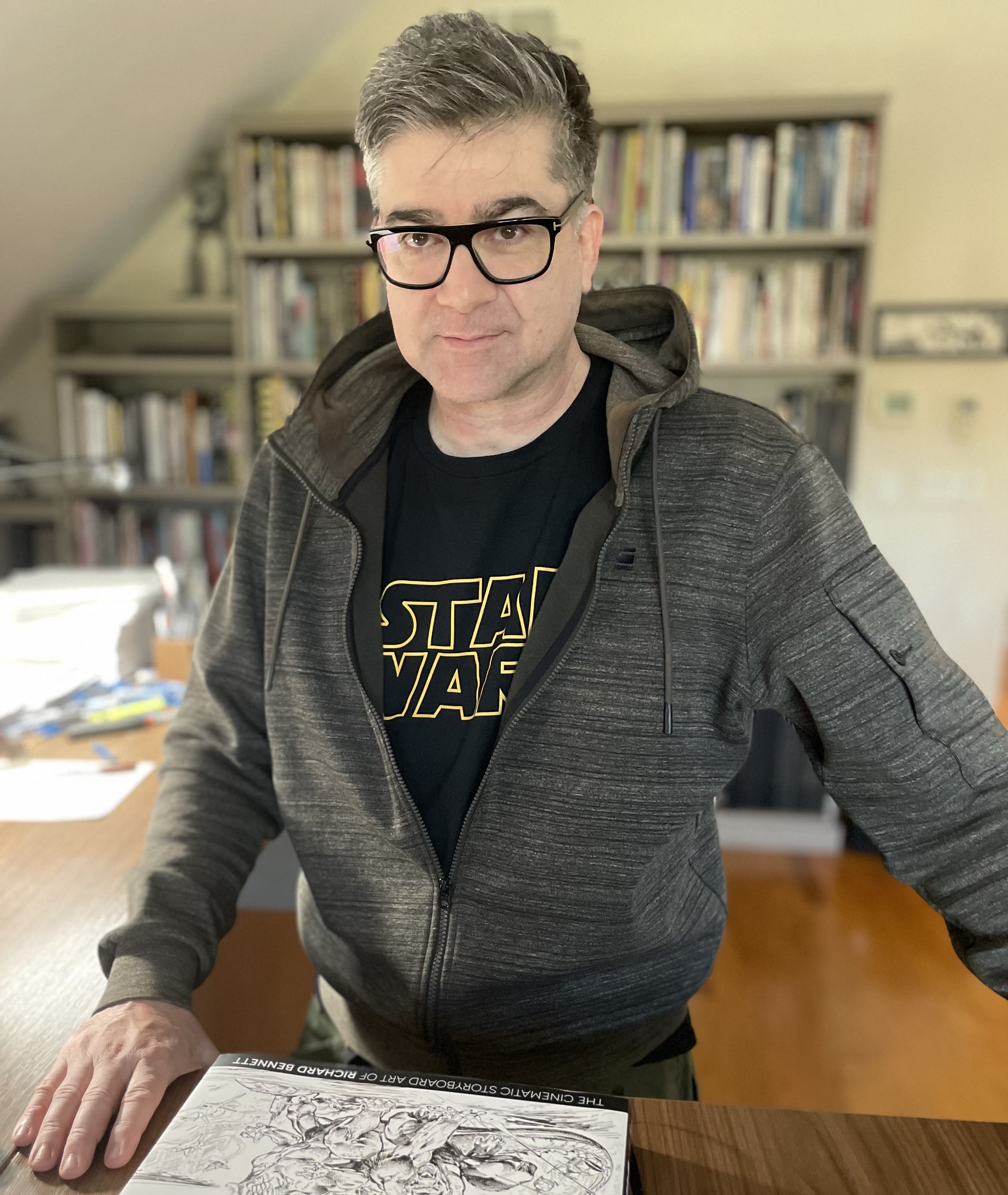
- Born: Richard Bennett Lamas; April 25, 1968 (age 56); Montevideo
- Education: Professor Alvaro Fontana (Uruguay), Art Center College of Design, Pasadena, California
- Known for: comic books, film concept and storyboards
- Awards: Art Directors Guild Award winner- 2009 The Curious Case of Benjamin Button, 2020 Avengers: Endgame, 2021 Tenet

Richard Bennett is a former comic book artist and current film industry storyboard artist born in Uruguay. He broke into the comic book industry in 1990, penciling and inking the Cyberad series for Continuity Comics. In 1992, he began freelancing for Marvel Comics on various X-Men titles, then moving in 1994 to WildStorm, where he worked on a wide variety of titles, including the Brass mini-series. He also contributed to DC Comics, with works including "Stormwatch Vol. 2", "Gen 13: We'll Take Manhattan" and "Divine Right Vol. 2." Additionally, some of his artwork was featured in "Alan Moore: The Complete WildC.A.T.s"

In 1997, he did background and character design work for the first season of the animated Spawn HBO series. A year later, Bennett signed up to the full-time program at the Art Center College of Design in Pasadena. He attended between 1998 and 2003, graduating with a BFA in Illustration.

During 2003 he worked on the Alien vs Predator film, then in 2004 started working on commercials with director David Fincher.

In 2005 he became a member of the ADG Local 800 in Los Angeles, and has been steadily storyboarding mainly for films ever since, having collaborated with directors such as David Fincher, Christopher Nolan, Brad Bird and JJ Abrams among many others.

Some of the projects he has worked on include Zodiac, The Curious Case of Benjamin Button, The Social Network, Star Trek, Mission Impossible: Ghost Protocol, Avengers, Captain America: Winter Soldier, Captain America: Civil War, Tron: Legacy, Dunkirk and Tenet.
