= Dark Beast (Marvel Comics) =

Marvel Comics supervillain

Publication information
- Publisher: Marvel Comics
- First appearance: X-Men: Alpha #1 (February 1995)
- Created by: Scott Lobdell; Roger Cruz

In-story information
- Alter ego: Henry Phillip McCoy
- Species: Human mutant
- Team affiliations: Morlocks; Brotherhood of Mutants; X-Men (infiltrated); Dark X-Men
- Abilities: Same as Beast

Dark Beast (Henry Phillip McCoy) is a supervillain appearing in American comic books published by Marvel Comics. He is an alternative reality version of Beast. This version of the character is a mad scientist and geneticist.

== Publication history ==
Dark Beast debuted in X-Men: Alpha #1 (1995), created by Scott Lobdell and Roger Cruz. He appeared in the X-Factor series, as well as the 2004 Astonishing X-Men series.

== Fictional character biography ==
=== Age of Apocalypse ===
In the alternate dimension he came from, Hank McCoy is a mad scientist and geneticist working for Mister Sinister, intent on breeding more powerful mutants according to Apocalypse's "survival of the fittest" ideology. Because of Charles Xavier's death, and without being taught ethical science while in the X-Men, McCoy becomes ruthless, finding delight in causing pain to his lab subjects. His cruelty causes him to be nicknamed "the Beast" by prisoners and Sinister's Elite Mutant Force. McCoy also experimented on himself in order to further his mutation, gaining a bestial ape-like appearance. Any mutant who he deems unworthy is turned into a component of a genetic stew that is used to create Apocalypse's army of Infinites.

=== Into Earth-616 ===
Dark Beast escapes from his universe into Earth-616 through the M'Kraan Crystal. Presumed dead, he lands twenty years in the past and sustains amnesia. Dark Beast soon meets Emma Frost, who helps him regain some of his memories. Dark Beast then sets up a base in Manhattan's subway tunnels, where he experiments on the Morlocks. Mister Sinister recognizes Dark Beast's actions as an unauthorized use of his own theories, which contributes to him ordering the elimination of the Morlocks. Fearing discovery, Dark Beast continues his operations in secret.

=== Infiltrating the X-Men ===
Dark Beast later kidnaps the real Beast and impersonates him to infiltrate the X-Men, although he occasionally finds himself at risk of discovery due to his limited knowledge. He helps keep up the ruse by killing many of Hank's childhood friends and teachers, although he finds himself unable to kill Hank's parents. Dark Beast keeps up his ruse until the Onslaught Saga, during which he allies with Onslaught. Onslaught had known of Dark Beast's ruse from the beginning and shielded him from telepathic detection, intending to question him about the reality of his origin. Upon learning what happened in Dark Beast's reality when mutants ruled, Onslaught decided to destroy both races rather than helping mutants take their place as the world's rulers, only being defeated due to the apparent sacrifice of the Avengers and Fantastic Four.

=== Gene Nation ===
Dark Beast also had a few run-ins with Generation X and Gene Nation. He serves as the leader of the newly revamped Gene Nation, attempting to capture Generation X to experiment on them. He also leads an incarnation of the Brotherhood of Mutants.

Shortly before the events of House of M, Dark Beast joins Charles Xavier's team after being offered parole. He maintains his powers after M-Day, when the Scarlet Witch removed the powers of almost every mutant on Earth.

=== Endangered Species ===
Dark Beast returns and finally confronts his counterpart to offer his services regarding finding a cure for M-Day. The two form an uneasy alliance to tackle the impending mutant extinction, but part ways due to their drastically different moral approaches to science. While visiting the Guthrie family to obtain DNA samples, Dark Beast poisons Lewis, one of the non-mutant children, without warning. Shocked and enraged with his actions, Hank attacks Dark Beast who, disgusted with his inability to do all that is necessary to save mutantkind, beats him almost unconscious. Dark Beast is interrupted by Mrs. Guthrie, who shoots him in his left shoulder, and is then knocked unconscious by Hank.

=== Dark X-Men ===
During the Dark Reign storyline, Dark Beast appears as a member of the Dark X-Men, a team of X-Men put together by Norman Osborn. He constructs a device known as the "Omega Machine" to experiment on mutants in Alcatraz for H.A.M.M.E.R. and starts testing on Beast, slowly killing him. Osborn is not impressed with the test results of the Omega Machine and wants Dark Beast to make sure the machine works in removing powers from mutants, not killing them. Dark Beast attempts to capture Mindee of the Stepford Cuckoos as a new test subject, but is attacked and stabbed multiple times by Wolverine and Warpath.

Dark Beast recovers quickly and is sent alongside Mimic, Weapon Omega, and Mystique to investigate the cause of several inhabitants of a small town to dream-walk and continuously repeat "I'm an X-Man". As they investigate, both Mimic and Omega are overwhelmed by an unspecified energy and go on a rampage. Shortly thereafter, the energy takes the form of Nate Grey, to Dark Beast's shock.

=== Back to origins ===
Dark Beast has since returned to the Morlock tunnels after the fall of Norman Osborn. He captures the Lizard and develops a method to transform humans into reptilian creatures like him. When the X-Men and Spider-Man find his base, Dark Beast proceeds to mutate Gambit, Storm, and Wolverine. Emma Frost is protected by her diamond form, giving her and Spider-Man time to escape Dark Beast's minions and release the Lizard to knock him out.

=== X-Termination ===
Dark Beast builds a portal and returns to his home universe with Nightcrawler. This inadvertently releases the Exterminators, beings created by the Celestials with the ability to destroy whatever they touch. Nightcrawler sacrifices himself to get everyone to safety as the Exterminators are trapped in the Age of Apocalypse reality. Dark Beast survives these events and is imprisoned.

=== Vindictive End ===
Dark Beast escapes prison and begins hunting the X-Men using classified research sources from S.H.I.E.L.D. Beast launches a coordinated attack using a hijacked Helicarrier to launch a nuclear strike, and new Sentinels that have adapted to all the X-Men's powers. However, he does not account for new X-Men member David Bond, aka Hijack, who can control any electronic device. Dark Beast's body has become so weak after experimenting on himself that he requires a life support suit. After a short battle, Dark Beast's suit is punctured and he sets off a bomb that apparently kills him.

=== Return ===
During the "Secret Empire" storyline, Dark Beast turns up alive and no longer having health problems. He is shown to have set up a laboratory under an outhouse somewhere in the mutant nation of New Tian following Hydra's takeover. After Quake and the Secret Warriors find Dark Beast's hidden lair, he is taken into the mutants' custody.

Faced with a lack of resources, Cyclops agrees to let Dark Beast work on an 'anti-vaccine' to neutralize a mutant 'vaccine', with Warlock monitoring the anti-vaccine to ensure that it does only what Dark Beast says. After the anti-vaccine is dispersed worldwide, it is revealed that Dark Beast and Mister Sinister had made the virus lethal to those with an unactivated X-Gene in addition to its intended effect. As Dark Beast continues mocking the X-Men, Magik executes him with her teleportation discs.

During the "Sins of Sinister" storyline, it is revealed that Dark Beast's head was retrieved by Mister Sinister, who secretly keeps him alive in a tube.

== Powers and abilities ==
Dark Beast has the same superhuman abilities and intelligence as the Earth-616's Beast before he underwent his secondary mutation. Dark Beast was not physically as powerful as his counterpart in the normal Marvel continuity as he did not train on a regular basis, also hampered by the fact that he is 20 years older than the main universe's Beast. While as intelligent as his counterpart, "normal" Beast seems to possess a larger spectrum of knowledge, as evidenced when Dark Beast was infiltrating the X-Men and became annoyed at the amount of knowledge the X-Men expected from him. This is due to Dark Beast specializing in genetics, while 616 Beast maintained study in multiple fields.

After gaining a cybernetic body courtesy of Mister Sinister, Dark Beast can counter-react to any attack made at him. He has demonstrated the ability to alter the shape of his body and generate new limbs, energy-deflecting shields and weapons. The cannons in his arms allow Dark Beast to project powerful energy beams and he can also discharge powerful electric shocks from his body.

== Reception ==
- In 2019, CBR ranked Dark Beast 3rd in "All Of The Dark X-Men" list.
- In 2020, CBR ranked Dark Beast 2nd in "X-Men: Every Version Of Beast" list.
- In 2025, CBR ranked Dark Beast 4th in "The 6 Best Obscure X-Men Villains" list.

== Other versions ==
=== Mutant X ===
An alternate universe version of Dark Beast appears in X-Men: Endangered Species.

=== Secret Wars (2015) ===
An alternate universe version of Dark Beast from Battleworld appears in Secret Wars.

== In other media ==
=== Video games ===
- Dark Beast appears as a boss in X-Men Legends II: Rise of Apocalypse. This version is Beast, who was brainwashed by Apocalypse and Mister Sinister into serving them.
- Dark Beast is featured as an Age of Apocalypse alternate uniform for Beast in Marvel Future Fight.

=== Merchandise ===
- In 1997, Toy Biz released a Dark Beast action figure.
- In 2018, HeroClix released a Dark Beast miniature model. In 2021, another miniature model was released.
- In 2019, Hasbro released a Dark Beast action figure, as part of the Marvel Legends action figure line.
