= Michael Pointer (character) =

Marvel Comics character

Omega
- Michael Pointer as depicted in Marvel Comics Presents (vol. 2) #4 (January 2008). Art by Mike Choi.

Publication information
- Publisher: Marvel Comics
- First appearance: New Avengers #16 (April 2006)
- Created by: Brian Michael Bendis (writer); Steve McNiven (artist)

In-story information
- Alter ego: Michael Pointer
- Species: Human mutant
- Team affiliations: Omega Flight; Dark X-Men; X-Men; Jean Grey School for Higher Learning
- Notable aliases: Omega; Weapon Omega; The Collective; Guardian
- Abilities: Mutant energy absorption and manipulation Flight

Michael Pointer is a fictional character code-named Omega, a mutant appearing in American comic books published by Marvel Comics.

== Publication history ==
He first appeared in New Avengers #16 (April 2006) as the Collective before becoming a member of the Omega Flight team.

== Fictional character biography ==
Michael Pointer is a mail carrier from North Pole, Alaska, who is unaware that he is a mutant with the ability to absorb the energy, abilities, and personalities of other mutants. He inadvertently becomes the focal point of the mutant energy displaced after the Decimation event, when almost every mutant had their powers removed by the Scarlet Witch. Possessed by the disembodied mind of Xorn, Pointer embarks on a rampage across North America, killing over 2,000 people and killed most of the original members of Alpha Flight.

The Collective travels to Genosha and begins transferring his powers to the recently depowered Magneto. After the ensuing battle between Magneto, the Collective, and the New Avengers, Pointer still possesses a large amount of residual energy. After the superhero Civil War, he is forced to join Omega Flight as a means of atoning for the damage he caused as the Collective. As a member of Omega Flight, Pointer utilizes a suit designed by Reed Richards to regulate his mutant absorption powers and briefly uses the Guardian name.

During Omega Flight's first mission, Pointer aids the group against the combined forces of the Wrecking Crew and Tanaraq. After the battle, Sasquatch apologizes for forcing Richards' suit onto Pointer, instructing him to avoid dwelling on the past and to instead do right by the Guardian-styled uniform and the nation it represents. Pointer also gains the forgiveness of Talisman, who realizes that he is genuinely remorseful.

Under the code name of Weapon Omega, Pointer next appears in the ongoing Marvel Comics Presents series, which lasted 12 issues. The Canadian government uses Pointer in a Weapon Omega project, in which he is provided energy from villains captured by Omega Flight. Pointer becomes addicted to the energy, but eventually stops the government's plans with the help of the other members of Omega Flight.

Weapon Omega is recruited to join the Dark X-Men, with Norman Osborn intending to have him 'atone' for all the deaths he helped cause. Osborn attempts to use a device created by Dark Beast (an alternate reality version of Beast) to siphon powers away from mutants and place them into Pointer. Pointer seems to develop an addiction to this, constantly yelling that he needs "more juice" during his power ups from the device.

After Osborn is taken down by the Avengers during the Siege storyline, Mimic and Weapon Omega leave H.A.M.M.E.R. When Weapon Omega's powers start acting up, Mimic goes to Beast for help, as he had been the only person who had always aided him when he needed it. Mimic takes Weapon Omega to the Xavier Institute, where Beast learns that Weapon Omega is going to explode. The X-Men attempt to prevent the explosion, but are forced to place Weapon Omega in an induced coma when all of the other methods fail.

Upon awakening from his induced coma, Pointer accompanies Mimic to assist in cleanup efforts in Montana after a hurricane. The X-Men student ForgetMeNot wants Pointer to remove his powers, which make everyone not actively focusing on him forget that he exists. Pointer convinces ForgetMeNot to hold on to his powers as he and Mimic fly off.

== Powers and abilities ==
Michael Pointer is a mutant with the ability to absorb the energy, personalities and abilities of other mutants. He must be near the mutant, but does not require contact. He wears a suit designed to focus absorbed energies into flight, durability, and energy blasts, but would otherwise demonstrate the same mutant powers he has absorbed. As the Collective, he contains the powers of almost every mutant on the planet.
