= List of Marvel Legends exclusive action figures =

Amazon Exclusive Marvel Legends

== Amazon ==
Release	Figure	Accessories	Description
2019	Deathlok Prime	Machine gun, shotgun and minigun	Uncanny X-Force version Repaint of the Sasquatch wave Deathlok
2020	Wolverine	Alternate head and bone claw hands	X2/The Wolverine version
2021	Deadpool	Twin katanas, two pistols, knife, six alternate hands	Deadpool 2 two ash-covered version Redeco of the Deadpool two two-pack Deadpool figure

=== Box sets ===
Box set	Release	Figure	Accessories	Description
Avengers: Age of Ultron	2015	Black Widow	Stun batons	Repaint of the Mandroid series Black Widow with new accessories Exclusive
Avengers: Age of Ultron	2015	Hawkeye	Bow and quiver	Retool of the Hawkeye from Walmart's (Non-Legends) The Avengers movie line Exclusive
Avengers: Age of Ultron	2015	Thor	Mjolnir	Exclusive
Avengers: Age of Ultron	2015	Bruce Banner		Exclusive
Defenders	December 2017	Luke Cage		Retool of the SDCC Thunderbolts box set figure
Defenders	December 2017	Daredevil	Batons	Repaint of the Hobgoblin wave Daredevil figure
Defenders	December 2017	Jewel		Exclusive
Defenders	December 2017	Iron Fist	Chi fist effect piece	Repaint of the Dormammu wave Iron Fist figure
Days of Future Past	2018	Wolverine	Alternate hands and pistol	Days of Future Past version Exclusive
Days of Future Past	2018	Sentinel		Repaint of the (Non-Legends) Marvel Universe Masterworks Sentinel; Exclusive
Iron Man 3	2018	Pepper Potts	Alternate repulsor arm and blast effect	Exclusive
Iron Man 3	2018	Mandarin (Trevor Slattery)		Exclusive; Originally slated to be released in the Iron Monger BAF wave back in 2013
Iron Man 3	2018	Iron Man		Mark XXII (Hot Rod) version Redeco and retool of the Iron Monger wave MCU Iron Patriot without the shoulder gun
Family Matters	2019	Magneto	Alternate head, hands and magnetic energy effects	Jim Lee version Redeco of the Apocalypse wave Magneto
Family Matters	2019	Scarlet Witch	Hex effect pieces	Retool and redeco of the Allfather wave Scarlet Witch
Family Matters	2019	Quicksilver	Alternate hands	Exclusive
Alpha Flight	December 2019	Northstar		Exclusive
Alpha Flight	December 2019	Aurora		Exclusive
Alpha Flight	December 2019	Vindicator		Exclusive
Alpha Flight	December 2019	Snowbird		Exclusive
Alpha Flight	December 2019	Shaman		Exclusive
Alpha Flight	December 2019	Puck		Retool of the 2013 BAF with a new head
X-Force	Fall 2020	Nimrod	Alternate classic head, two alternate hands, two blast effect pieces and energy wings	Powers of X version
X-Force	Fall 2020	Psylocke	Psychic katana, psychic knife, butterfly effect piece and alternate hand	Dark Angel Saga version Repaint of the Apocalypse wave Psylocke
X-Force	Fall 2020	Fantomex	Twin pistols, two gunfire effect pieces and two smoke effect pieces	Exclusive
Children of Thanos	Fall 2020	Thanos	Alternate burnt arm and head	Avengers: Infinity War version Retool of the 2018 BAF with new parts and accessories
Children of Thanos	Fall 2020	Cull Obsidian	Chain hammer	Avengers: Infinity War version Retool of the 2018 BAF with a new, film-accurate costume
Children of Thanos	Fall 2020	Proxima Midnight	Spear and sword	Avengers: Infinity War version Redeco of the Thanos BAF wave Proxima Midnight with a film-accurate color scheme
Children of Thanos	Fall 2020	Corvus Glaive	Glaive	Avengers: Infinity War version Rereleased from the Walmart-exclusive two-pack
Children of Thanos	Fall 2020	Ebony Maw		Avengers: Infinity War version Repaint of the Armored Thanos BAF wave Ebony Maw with a film-accurate color scheme

== Diamond ==
Figure	Release
Ultimate Wolverine	2008

=== Puck Series (2013) ===
Released to coincide with The Wolverine as a Hasbro Previews Exclusive, this features BAF Puck. Planned, though not released were an alternate version of Cyclops in his Phoenix Force outfit and a modern version of Rogue as an alternative figure to Emma Frost.

Figure	Accessories	Build-A-Figure Piece
Wolverine	Astonishing X-Men version Repaint of the Wolverine figure from the SDCC X-Force box set	
Sabretooth	Back In Japan version	Head
Emma Frost	Modern version	Torso and Legs
Cyclops	Astonishing X-Men (Simone Bianchi) version	Arms

== Disney Store ==
A five-pack featuring rereleased or repainted figures from previous waves, some of which had not previously been available in Europe. It was released in European Disney Stores to coincide with the release of Avengers: Age of Ultron.

Figure	Accessories	Description
Captain America	Shield	Re-released figure from the Mandroid BAF series
Iron Man	Alternate unmasked head	Redeco of the Bleeding Edge Iron Man figure from the Iron Monger BAF series
Thor	Mjolnir	Re-released figure from the Terrax BAF series
Hulk		Re-released figure from the Toys "R" Us two-pack with Valkyrie
Ultron		Redeco of Ultron figure from the Iron Monger BAF series

== EntertainmentEarth.com ==
Set	Release	Figure	Accessories	Description
Guardians of the Galaxy Box Set (Earth-616)	2015	Groot	Baby Groot in pot	Retool of the 2014 BAF with a new, comic-based head
Guardians of the Galaxy Box Set (Earth-616)	2015	Drax the Destroyer	Cosmic Cube, four daggers and interchangeable hands	Exclusive
Guardians of the Galaxy Box Set (Earth-616)	2015	Gamora	Alternate head, cloak and sword	Exclusive
Guardians of the Galaxy Box Set (Earth-616)	2015	Star-Lord	Two blasters	Repaint of the Thanos Imperative box set Star-Lord figure
Guardians of the Galaxy Box Set (Earth-616)	2015	Rocket Raccoon	Three blasters	Repaint of the 2013 BAF
Avengers: Infinity War	2018	Scarlet Witch	Energy effects	Repaint of the Abomination wave figure
Avengers: Infinity War	2018	Vision	Alternate hands	Exclusive
Secret Empire	2018	Captain America	Shield	Supreme Leader version Exclusive
Secret Empire	2018	Arnim Zola		Modern version Exclusive

== GameStop ==
Figure	Accessories	Description
Deadpool	Tendrils, twin energy katanas and alternate head and hands	Back in Black Venom Symbiote version
Spider-Man	Web line and alternate hands	Spider-Man video game version
Ultron		Avengers: Age of Ultron version Repaint of the 2015 BAF
Ronan the Accuser	Universal Weapon	Guardians of the Galaxy version
Hulk	Alternate head and hands	Avengers video game outback version

== HasbroToyShop.com (2008) ==
Hasbro had previously produced fan-voted figures for its Star Wars line. This was the first for Marvel Legends. In a poll run through ToyFare magazine, readers chose among eight Marvel characters for an exclusive figure. Sunfire won the vote, ahead of Silver Samurai and Gambit. The figure was packaged on a blister card with a flame-patterned background and a cardboard wrap around the bottom.

Figure	Description
Sunfire	Age of Apocalypse version

== HASCON ==
Figure	Accessories	Description
Deadpool	Twin katanas	Uncanny X-Force version

== Hasbro Pulse ==
Figure	Accessories	Description
Hydra Trooper	Rifle and pistol	Rerelease of the Mandroid wave Hydra Soldier at a discounted price and with different accessories
A.I.M. Trooper	Two guns and belt	Rerelease of the Mandroid wave A.I.M. figure
Hellfire Club Guard	Two guns	
Silk	Web-casting hand, four alternate hands, alternate head and scarf	Fan vote winner Redeco of the Space Knight Venom Silk

=== HasLab ===
Premium crowdfunded items that are too expensive, massive or niche to see traditional retail releases. The project was launched with a 26.3-inch (669 mm) Sentinel, the largest Marvel Legends figure to date.

Set	Release	Figure	Accessories	Description
Sentinel	2020	Sentinel	Alternate Master Mold head, alternate Tri-Sentinel head, alternate battle damaged head, alternate battle damaged hand and two tentacles	Powers of X version Light-up eyes and chest reactor
Sentinel	2020	Bastion	Alternate Prime Sentinel head	X-Men Blue version
Sentinel	2020	Female Prime Sentinel		Operation: Zero Tolerance version

== Marvel Unlimited Online ==
Free with the purchase of a new Marvel Unlimited Plus digital comics subscription at Marvel.com.

Figure	Year	Accessories	Description	Comic
Ultron	2013	Stand, personalized Plus Member card, welcome letter and custom collectible comic box	Gold repaint of the Iron Monger wave Ultron	Age of Ultron #10 (variant edition) cover art by Salvador Larroca
Rocket Raccoon	2014	Rocket blaster, a personalized member plus card and savings at Marvel.com	Repainted BAF (Red Gloves and Trim to White Gloves and Trim)	Rocket Raccoon #1 variant comic book with cover art by Sara Pichelli
Rescue	2016		Announced in 2013 as part of the Iron Monger series, but was shelved for unknown reasons.	
Captain Marvel (Carol Danvers)	2017		Time Runs Out gray/silver costume version Repaint of the Allfather wave figure	
Tony Stark	2018		Marvel Cinematic Universe (MCU) head sculpt with suit color inspired by Invincible Iron Man (2015) #1; Reused Chameleon body mold with Tony Stark alternate head sculpt from Captain America: Civil War three-pack figure	
Venom-Punisher	2018	Two guns	Punisher Venom symbiote version What If... Venom had possessed The Punisher? version	Black Panther (2018) #1 Venomized variant and Venom #1 Punisher variant
Terror Inc.	2019	Two katanas	Mercs for Money Deadpool costume version Repaint of the Juggernaut wave Deadpool	House of X #1-2
Ms. Marvel (Kamala Khan)	2020	Alternate enlarged hands	Marvel Team-Up Spider-Man cosplay version Redeco of the Sandman wave Ms. Marvel	Iron Man (2020) #1-2
Kitty Pryde	2021	Sword and Lockheed	House of X Marauders version Repaint of the Juggernaut wave Kitty Pryde with a new scarf	Sinister War #1 and X-Men (2021) #1

== Movie Comic Media London Comic Convention ==
Figure	Release	Accessories	Description
Gray Hulk	2019	Crushed pipe	Retool of the 80th anniversary two-pack Hulk with a new head Later released online after convention
Deadpool	2019	Twin katanas, two machine guns, rifle and pistol	Rob Liefeld version Repaint of the Sasquatch wave Deadpool; Later released online after convention

== San Diego Comic Convention ==
Figure	Release	Accessories	Description
She-Hulk	2007	Interchangeable Pieces	Converts from lawyer suit to Fantastic Four uniform
Stan Lee	2007	Spider-Man Arms and Legs, Spider-Man and Peter Parker Heads	Removable clothes reveals a Spider-Man body
Thor	2011	Mjölnir	Oliver Coipel version Initially revealed at The New York Toy Fair in 2011, this figure was later released in the Return of Marvel Legends Terrax series. The first Marvel Legends figure to be released in the new relaunched line. It was released in special Mjölnir shaped package and featured the character with a paint deco that makes him look as if he is about to wield the power of lightning.
Red Skull	2018	Tesseract and life-sized light up Tesseract role play accessory	Captain America: The First Avenger version Retool of the First Ten Years Red Skull figure with a new overcoat
Hulk	2019	Crushed pipe	Dale Keown version Retool of the 80th Anniversary Hulk with a new head

=== Box Sets ===
Set	Release	Figure	Accessories	Description
Savage Land	2008	Ka-Zar	Weapons	Exclusive
Savage Land	2008	Shanna the She-Devil	Rifle	Exclusive
Savage Land	2008	Zabu		Exclusive
Fin Fang Foom	2008	Absorbing Man		
Fin Fang Foom	2008	Doc Samson		
Fin Fang Foom	2008	Hulk		Hulk: The End version
Fin Fang Foom	2008	King Hulk		Planet Hulk version, Retool of the Hulk Classics War Hulk figure from ToyBiz with a new head, hands, legs and accessories
Fin Fang Foom	2008	Savage Grey Hulk		Regular version
Fin Fang Foom	2008	Savage Grey Hulk		Classic Green Hulk Variant
Fin Fang Foom	2008	She-Hulk		First Appearance (Savage She-Hulk) version
Fin Fang Foom	2008	Skaar		Son of Hulk
Fin Fang Foom	2008	Wendigo		
Uncanny X-Force	2012	Psylocke	Psychic katana	Uncanny X-Force version
Uncanny X-Force	2012	Archangel	Attachable wings	Uncanny X-Force version
Uncanny X-Force	2012	Wolverine		Uncanny X-Force version
The Thunderbolts	2013	Luke Cage		Thunderbolts version Exclusive
The Thunderbolts	2013	Moonstone		Thunderbolts version Exclusive
The Thunderbolts	2013	Ghost	Alternate head	Translucent version Thunderbolts version Exclusive
The Thunderbolts	2013	Satana		Thunderbolts version Exclusive
The Thunderbolts	2013	Crossbones	Gatling gun	Thunderbolts version Redeco of the Ares wave Crossbones
The Thanos Imperative	2014	Black Bolt		The Thanos Imperative version
The Thanos Imperative	2014	Medusa		The Thanos Imperative version
The Thanos Imperative	2014	Star-Lord	Two blasters	The Thanos Imperative version
The Thanos Imperative	2014	Gladiator (Kallark)		The Thanos Imperative version
The Thanos Imperative	2014	Blastaar		Exclusive
Ant-Man	2015	Giant-Man		12-Inch
Ant-Man	2015	Goliath		6-Inch
Ant-Man	2015	Hank Pym	Lab coat and alternate heads	3.75"
Ant-Man	2015	Ant-Man (Scott Lang)		1.5"
Ant-Man	2015	Ant-Man (Hank Pym)		1"
Book of the Vishanti	2015	Doctor Strange	Two hex blasts	Marvel NOW! Astral form version Exclusive
Book of the Vishanti	2015	Doctor Voodoo	Staff	
Book of the Vishanti	2015	Magik	Two swords	Exclusive
Book of the Vishanti	2015	Hela	Sword	Exclusive
Book of the Vishanti	2015	Dormammu	Two flaming skull effects	
The Raft	2016	Spider-Man		Todd McFarlane version Repaint of the Hobgoblin wave Spider-Man; Exclusive
The Raft	2016	Abomination		Repaint of the 2016 BAF
The Raft	2016	Purple Man		Exclusive
The Raft	2016	Enchantress	Magical energy effects	
The Raft	2016	Dreadknight	Sword and lance	Exclusive
The Raft	2016	Sandman		Exclusive brown and tan coloration
Battle for Asgard (packaging illustrated by Tyler Jacobson)	2017	Thor (Jane Foster)	Mjolnir	
Battle for Asgard (packaging illustrated by Tyler Jacobson)	2017	Odinson	Jarnbjorn axe	Unworthy Thor; Exclusive
Battle for Asgard (packaging illustrated by Tyler Jacobson)	2017	Malekith the Accursed	Sword	
Battle for Asgard (packaging illustrated by Tyler Jacobson)	2017	Ulik		Exclusive
Battle for Asgard (packaging illustrated by Tyler Jacobson)	2017	Bor	Shield and axe	Exclusive
Netflix Defenders	2018	Daredevil	Batons and alternate unmasked head	Daredevil version Rerelease of the Man-Thing wave figure with new accessories
Netflix Defenders	2018	Jessica Jones		Jessica Jones version Retool of the Man-Thing wave figure with no jacket
Netflix Defenders	2018	Luke Cage		Luke Cage version
Netflix Defenders	2018	Iron Fist		Iron Fist version Exclusive
Netflix Defenders	2018	Colleen Wing	Katana and scabbard	Iron Fist version Exclusive
Elders of the Universe	2019	Collector	Orb and alternate head	Guardians of the Galaxy version Exclusive
Elders of the Universe	2019	Grandmaster	Melt Stick and melted prisoner puddle	Thor: Ragnarok version Retool of the Marvel 80th Anniversary version with a new head and accessory
X-Men 20th Anniversary	2020	Wolverine	Two alternate bloodied claw hands, two normal hands and alternate screaming head	Logan version Exclusive
X-Men 20th Anniversary	2020	Professor X	Wheelchair	Logan version Exclusive
Hellfire Club	2020	Sebastian Shaw	Book, two guns and crumpled Wolverine mask	
Hellfire Club	2020	Jean Grey	Cat o' nine tails, four alternate hands and alternate Selene head	Black Queen version
Hellfire Club	2020	Donald Pierce	Magneto's helmet and four alternate hands	
Hellfire Club	2020	Emma Frost		Classic White Queen version

== Target ==
Figure	Release	Accessories	Description
Hulk	2008		The Incredible Hulk (film) version Uses the body of the Toy Biz series 1 Hulk with a new head sculpt
Captain Marvel	2019	Alternate unmasked head and hands, and alternate Minn-Erva head, scarf, bandolier and Kree sniper rifle	Captain Marvel Starforce uniform version
Stan Lee	2020	Autographed Captain America shield and chess board	The Avengers version Originally scheduled to be released in 2018 as a Build-A-Figure whose parts would've been packaged with the Target-exclusive Erik Killmonger/Everett Ross and Falcon/Winter Soldier two-packs, but was delayed for unknown reasons.
Black Widow (Natasha Romanova)	2020	Sniper rifle, two pistols, two blast effect pieces and two smoke effect pieces	Black Widow: Deadly Origin snow camo version
Red Hulk	2020	Alternate hands	Deluxe release
Iron Man	2020	Alternate hands and four blast effect pieces	Avengers video game Starboost armor version
Gambit	2020	Staff, energized playing card and alternate hand	Vintage version Redeco of the Caliban wave Gambit with a new head
Rogue	2020	Alternate hands	Vintage version Redeco of the Juggernaut wave Rogue with a new head and glove-holding hand
Cyborg Spider-Man	2020	Web line and alternate hand	Vintage version
Spider-Man	2020	Pizza slice and four alternate hands	Negative Zone version Repaint of the Hobgoblin wave Spider-Man figure
Katy and Morris	2021	Bow, quiver, two arrows and two alternate hands	Shang-Chi and the Legend of the Ten Rings version

=== Red Hulk Series (2008) ===
This Marvel Legends BAF series consisted of seven figures, each of which is paired with one of the six parts needed to build Red Hulk.

Figure	Description	Build-A-Figure Piece
Adam Warlock		Left Leg
Silver Surfer	Silver Savage Planet Hulk gladiator armor version	Right Leg
Spider-Man	Symbiote costume version	Left Arm
Spiral	Regular version	Head
Spiral	Gold-accented variant	Head
Union Jack		Torso
Wolverine	Classic yellow and blue costume version Retool of the Toy Biz Wolverine figure from Series 4	Right Arm
Wolverine	Black costume variant from Uncanny X-Men (1963) #381	Right Arm

=== Box Sets ===
Name	Release	Figure	Accessories	Description
Infinite Three-Pack	2014	Ms. Marvel		Warbird costume Exclusive
Infinite Three-Pack	2014	Ultimate Captain America	Shield and alternate head	Reptaint of the Hit-Monkey wave Ultimate Captain America
Infinite Three-Pack	2014	Radioactive Man		Exclusive
Infinite Three-Pack	2015	Doc Green		Marvel NOW! version Thanos BAF series Hulk remold Exclusive
Infinite Three-Pack	2015	Ultron		Age of Ultron version Remold of Ultimate Green Goblin BAF series Beetle; Exclusive
Infinite Three-Pack	2015	Vision		West Coast Avengers version White repaint of Hulkbuster BAF series Vision
Captain America: Civil War	2016	War Machine	Stun baton, mini-guns and alternate hands	Mark III armor version Exclusive
Captain America: Civil War	2016	Iron Man	Shoulder-mounted machine gun	Iron Man 3 Mark XXVII (Disco) Armor version Repaint of the MCU Iron Patriot figure from the Iron Monger BAF Series
Thor: Ragnarok	2017	Thor	Sword, lightning effect and interchangeable hands	Thor: Ragnarok version Retool of the Gladiator Hulk wave Thor with a new head
Thor: Ragnarok	2017	Valkyrie	Dragonfang sword and scabbard	Thor: Ragnarok version Exclusive
Black Panther	2018	Erik Killmonger	Sword, spear and alternate unmasked head	Vibranium suit version Retool of the Okoye wave Erik Killmonger with a new head
Black Panther	2018	Everett K. Ross	Handgun	Exclusive
Avengers: Infinity War	2018	Falcon	Attachable wings, flight pack, assault rifle and Redwing drone	Repaint of the Walmart-exclusive Falcon
Avengers: Infinity War	2018	Winter Soldier	Laser cannon	Exclusive
Into the Spider-Verse	2018	Spider-Man (Miles Morales)	Venom blast effect piece, alternate unmasked head and hands	Redeco of the Space Knight Venom wave Miles Morales
Into the Spider-Verse	2018	Spider-Gwen	Alternate unmasked head and two web-lines	Redeco of the Absorbing Man wave Spider-Gwen
Spider-Man: Homecoming	2019	Spider-Man	Alternate hands	Retool of the Vulture wave Spider-Man with a new Midtown High School jacket
Spider-Man: Homecoming	2019	MJ	Alternate head and hands	Exclusive
Avengers: Endgame	2019	Hawkeye	Bow and alternate Iron Man and Ant-Man heads	Quantum Realm suit version Exclusive
Avengers: Endgame	2019	Black Widow	Pistol, connecting batons, alternate Nebula head	Quantum Realm suit version Exclusive
Kraven's Last Hunt	2019	Spider-Man	Alternate hands and battle-damaged head	Black costume version Rerelease of the Sandman wave Spider-Man with a new alternate head
Kraven's Last Hunt	2019	Kraven the Hunter	Sniper rifle and spear	Classic version Retool and redeco of the Rhino wave Kraven with classic colors and a new head
Giant-Size X-Men	2020	Storm	Two lightning effect pieces, alternate head, four alternate hands, alternate cape	Classic version Exclusive
Giant-Size X-Men	2020	Thunderbird		Exclusive

== Toys "R" Us ==
Release	Figure	Accessories	Description
2007	Wolverine		Silver version of Series 6 Wolverine; 25th Anniversary
2007	Emma Frost		Translucent version of the Annihilus wave Emma Frost figure
2007	Jean Grey		Black Queen version Retool of the Annihilus wave Emma Frost figure with a new head
2017	Groot	Baby Groot and potted Groot sapling	Guardians of the Galaxy Vol. two version

=== Jubilee Series (2014) ===
This wave was released with poor distribution, it was then supposed to ship to comic shops a few weeks later, but before that could happen Hasbro announced to Diamond that it had sold out of the assortment, making this, ultimately, an exclusive Toys "R" Us collection.

Figure	Accessories	Description	Build-A-Figure Piece
Cyclops		Marvel NOW! version	Right arm
Magneto		Classic version	Left arm
Storm		Uncanny X-Force version	Torso and legs
Stryfe	Sword	Classic version	Head and energy blasts
Wolverine		Unmasked Astonishing X-Men (Simone Bianchi) version Redeco of the Puck wave Wolverine with a new head	

=== Box Sets ===
Name	Release	Figure	Accessories	Description
Deadpool and Warpath	2010	Deadpool	Machine gun, pistol, two katanas with removable sheaths and two knives	Red and black costume version
Deadpool and Warpath		Warpath	Machine gun, pistol, two katanas with removable sheaths and two knives	Black and silver X-Force costume version
Deadpool and Warpath (Variant)		Deadpool	Machine gun, pistol, two katanas with removable sheaths and two knives	Blue costume version
Deadpool and Warpath (Variant)		Warpath	Machine gun, pistol, two katanas with removable sheaths and two knives	Red and blue costume version
Valkyrie and Hulk		Valkyrie	Gold sword, bo staff, removable cape and sheath	Classic version
Valkyrie and Hulk		Hulk	Gold sword, bo staff, removable cape and sheath	Ed McGuinness version Retool and repaint of the Red Hulk BAF
Black Widow (Natasha Romanova) and Winter Soldier		Black Widow	Two machine guns, two pistols and two alternate heads	Black costume version
Black Widow (Natasha Romanova) and Winter Soldier		Winter Soldier	Two machine guns, two pistols and two alternate heads	Captain America's shield star on left shoulder
Black Widow (Natasha Romanova) and Winter Soldier (variant)		Black Widow	Two machine guns, two pistols and two alternate heads	Gray costume version
Black Widow (Natasha Romanova) and Winter Soldier (variant)		Winter Soldier	Two machine guns, two pistols and two alternate heads	Red star on left shoulder
Original X-Men	2014	Cyclops		Classic Jack Kirby yellow costume version
Original X-Men	2014	Marvel Girl		Classic Jack Kirby yellow costume version
Original X-Men	2014	Beast		Classic Jack Kirby yellow costume version
Original X-Men	2014	Angel		Classic Jack Kirby yellow costume version
Original X-Men	2014	Iceman		Translucent version
S.H.I.E.L.D.	2015	Maria Hill		The Avengers version Exclusive
S.H.I.E.L.D.	2015	Nick Fury	Two guns	The Avengers version; Previously available in the (Non-Legends), Captain America: The First Avenger series
S.H.I.E.L.D.	2015	Phil Coulson	Revenge blaster and alternate head	The Avengers version Exclusive
Avengers	2016	Vision	Cape	All-New Marvel NOW! version Exclusive
Avengers	2016	Captain America (Sam Wilson)	Shield	Exclusive
Avengers	2016	Hawkeye (Kate Bishop)	Bow	Exclusive
Spider-Man & Mary Jane	2017	Spider-Man	Alternate head & hands	All-New All-Different version Repaint of the Hobgoblin wave Spider-Man
Spider-Man & Mary Jane	2017	Mary Jane Watson	Purse	Exclusive
Cyclops & Dark Phoenix	2017	Cyclops	Uncanny X-Men version	Exclusive
Cyclops & Dark Phoenix	2017	Jean Grey	Two alternate heads & Phoenix bird	Dark Phoenix version Retool of the Juggernaut wave Jean Grey figure
A-Force	2017	Singularity		Exclusive
A-Force	2017	Lady Loki	Cape	Exclusive
A-Force	2017	Sif	Sword and cape	Exclusive
A-Force	2017	Spectrum		Exclusive
A-Force	2017	Elsa Bloodstone	Two rifles	Exclusive
A-Force	2017	She-Hulk		Exclusive
Hydra Troopers	2017	Hydra Soldier	Rifle, machine gun and alternate heads	Retool of the Mandroid series figure
Hydra Troopers	2017	Hydra Enforcer	Rocket launcher, rifle, knife and alternate heads	Captain Britain head, Nuke body repaint Exclusive
Black Panther	2018	Black Panther (Shuri)	Vibranium spear	Exclusive
Black Panther	2018	Klaw	Sonic energy effect	Exclusive

== Walgreens ==
Release	Figure	Accessories	Description
2014	Agent Venom	Four guns and tendrils	Flash Thompson, as he first appeared in Secret Avengers (2010) #23
2015	Black Ant		Ant-Man's Life Model Decoy version
2015	Daredevil	Billy clubs	First appearance yellow costume version
2016	Namor	Trident and alternate hands	Modern version
2016	Punisher	Alternate head, Two Guns and a Rocket Launcher	Jim Lee version
2017	Invisible Woman and H.E.R.B.I.E.	Alternate hand	
2017	Human Torch	Flame effect pieces and alternate hands	
2017	Medusa		Retool of Medusa from the Thanos Imperative box set
2018	Mister Fantastic	Alternate bendable arms, Ultimate Nullifier	
2018	The Thing	Alternate head and hands	
2018	Silver Surfer	Surfboard, power cosmic effects and four alternate hands	
2018	Magik	Two swords, alternate hand, three magic effects, flaming skull and Lockheed	Modern version Rerelease of the Magik figure from the SDCC-exclusive Book of the Vishanti set
2019	Mystique	Pistol, laser rifle, and alternate Rogue and Lilandra heads	Classic version
2019	Doctor Doom	Alternate unmasked head, alternate hands, cloak, two repulsor blast effect pieces and two magic effect pieces	Infamous Iron Man version
2019	Emma Frost	Alternate hands and classic head	Marvel NOW! version
2019	Danielle Moonstar	Bow, arrow, alternate hands, alternate Wolfsbane head and claws, and alternate Karma head	New Mutants version
2020	Celeste Cuckoo	Cerebro helmet, alternate hands, two psychic effect pieces and alternate Mindee Cuckoo and Phoebe Cuckoo heads	Marvel NOW! version
2020	Iron Man 2020	Alternate hands, two blast effect pieces, two exhaust flame pieces and fire display base	
2020	Moon Knight	Alternate head and hands, bo staff and five crescent moon throwing discs	Classic version
2020	Iron Man	Two alternate hands, two blast effect pieces, two exhaust flame effect pieces and two burst effect pieces	Silver Centurion version
2021	The Fallen One	Mjolnir, surfboard, alternate hands and two energy effect pieces	Thanos Wins version Redeco of the Walgreens-exclusive Silver Surfer
2021	Nova (Richard Rider) and Qubit	Alternate hands and flight stand for Qubit	Classic version

== Walmart ==
Year	Figure	Accessories	Description	Comic
2002	Iron Man	Display Stand	Stealth Armor version	Iron Man Vol. 1 #149
2002	Hulk	Display Stand, Removable White Shirt		Incredible Hulk Vol. 1 #314
2007	Silver Surfer	Surfboard	Repainted Toy Biz Figure without blue wash	
2016	Falcon	Attachable wings, flight pack and Redwing drone	Captain America: Civil War version	
2016	Winter Soldier	Pistol and combat knife	Captain America: Civil War version	
2017	Black Panther	Spear, cape and necklace	Repainted Rocket Raccoon wave version without blue wash	
2018	Black Panther	Alternate head, hands and two kinetic Vibranium energy effect pieces	All-New, All-Different Marvel version	
2018	Thanos	Infinity Gauntlet and alternate head	Repaint of the 2015 BAF	
2019	Captain America	Shield, alternate hands, shield-throwing effect piece and alternate head	80th anniversary Alex Ross version	
2019	Captain Marvel	Power effects and alternate masked head	Captain Marvel Binary version	
2019	Captain America	Mjolnir, shield, and alternate unmasked head	Avengers: Endgame version	
2020	Black Widow (Natasha Romanova)	Alternate hands, two gauntlets with blast effects, two smoking gauntlets and S.H.I.E.L.D. jetpack with two exhaust flame effect pieces	90s Avengers bomber jacket version	
2020	Cable	Energy rifle, shotgun, pistol and two alternate hands	Deadpool two version	
2020	Captain America	Symbiote shield	Venomized Spider-Man: Maximum Venom version	
2021	Captain America (John Walker)	Shield and alternate unmasked head	The Falcon and the Winter Soldier version	

=== Build-A-Figure ===
Build-A-Figure	Release	Figure	Accessories	Description	Comic	Build-A-Figure Piece
Giant-Man	2007	Ant-Man (Scott Lang)	Helmet		Marvel Premiere (1972) #47	Right arm
Giant-Man	2007	Captain Britain			Excalibur (1988) #1	Right leg
Giant-Man	2007	Havok			Uncanny X-Men (1963) #97	Left leg
Giant-Man	2007	Kitty Pryde and Lockheed		Astonishing X-Men version	Astonishing X-Men (2004) #6	Upper torso and head
Giant-Man	2007	Sabretooth		Age of Apocalypse version	Astonishing X-Men (1995) #2	Left foot
Giant-Man	2007	Sentry		Clean shaven, short hair, yellow	New Avengers (2005) #3	Left arm
Giant-Man	2007	Sentry		Bearded, long hair, yellow variant	New Avengers (2005) #3	Left arm
Giant-Man	2007	Sentry		Clean shaven, short hair, tan variant	New Avengers (2005) #3	Left arm
Giant-Man	2007	Sentry		Bearded, long hair, tan variant	New Avengers (2005) #3	Left arm
Giant-Man	2007	Thor	Mjolnir		Thor (1980) #351	Right hand
Giant-Man	2007	Warbird			Avengers Annual (1963) #10	Lower torso
Giant-Man	2007	Weapon X (Age of Apocalypse Wolverine)			Weapon X (1995) #1	Right foot
Giant-Man	2007	Weapon X (Age of Apocalypse Wolverine)		Burnt face variant	Weapon X (1995) #1	Left hand
Ares	2008					
Ares	2008	Crossbones	Two guns	Modern version		Left leg
Ares	2008	Guardian				Lower torso
Ares	2008	Human Torch		Regular version		Left arm
Ares	2008	Human Torch		Semi-translucent variant		Left arm
Ares	2008	Iron Man		Heroes Reborn armor version		Helmet and swords
Ares	2008	Kang the Conqueror		Fantastic Four Classics (Non-Legends) repaint		Upper torso
Ares	2008	Spider-Man (Ben Reilly)				Right arm
Ares	2008	Vision				Right leg
Ares	2008	War Machine		Ultimate version		Head
Holocaust (Nemesis)	2009	Beast		Astonishing X-Men version		Right arm
Holocaust (Nemesis)	2009	Black Bolt				Right leg
Holocaust (Nemesis)	2009	Daredevil	Billy clubs	First appearance yellow/brown version		Lower torso
Holocaust (Nemesis)	2009	Daredevil		Red variant		Lower torso
Holocaust (Nemesis)	2009	Nova (Richard Rider)				Left leg
Holocaust (Nemesis)	2009	Punisher	Machine gun and pistol	Tim Bradstreet version		Left arm
Holocaust (Nemesis)	2009	Punisher	Machine gun and pistol	The Punisher (2005 video game) camo variant		Left arm
Holocaust (Nemesis)	2009	Tigra				Upper torso

=== Box Sets ===
Name	Release	Figure	Accessories	Description	Pack-In
Fantastic Four	2005	Human Torch	Display Stand	Partial flame-on version	Fantastic Four Poster Book
Fantastic Four	2005	Invisible Woman	Display stand	Heroes Reborn version	Fantastic Four Poster Book
Fantastic Four	2005	Mister Fantastic	Display Stand, alternate elongated hand and mallet hand	Heroes Reborn version	Fantastic Four Poster Book
Fantastic Four	2005	The Thing	Display stand, sunglasses, hat and removable trenchcoat		Fantastic Four Poster Book
Cable & Marvel Girl	2007	Cable	Two guns		
Cable & Marvel Girl	2007	Jean Grey		Green minidress version	
Cannonball & Domino	2007	Cannonball		Flight Jacket and goggles (late New Mutants) costume Exclusive	
Cannonball & Domino	2007	Domino	Two guns	Exclusive	
Ultimate Spider-Man Versus Vulture	2017	Ultimate Spider-Man	Alternate hands	Ultimate Spider-Man animated version Repaint of Space Venom wave Ultimate Spider-Man	
Ultimate Spider-Man Versus Vulture	2017	Ultimate Vulture	Alternate head from the Ultimate Spider-Man animated series	Ultimate Spider-Man comic version Exclusive	
Netflix	2018	Luke Cage		Luke Cage version Repaint of the SDCC exclusive figure	
Netflix	2018	Claire Temple	Claw gauntlets, and latex glove hands	Iron Fist version Exclusive	
Avengers: Infinity War	2019	Corvus Glaive	Glaive	Exclusive	
Avengers: Infinity War	2019	Loki	Tesseract	Redeco of the Gladiator Hulk wave Loki	
