= Master of the World (character) =

Marvel Comics fictional character

Publication information
- Publisher: Marvel Comics
- First appearance: Alpha Flight #2 (Sept. 1983)
- Created by: John Byrne

In-story information
- Alter ego: Eshu
- Team affiliations: Omega Flight
- Notable aliases: Joshua Lord; Forever Man; Master of Time; Master of Life; Phillipe Beaulieu; Master of Weirdworld
- Abilities: Genius-level intellect Repressed aging Battlesuit contains advanced technology and weapons Superhuman speed, reflexes, stamina, strength, agility and durability

Master of the World (Eshu) is a supervillain appearing in American comic books published by Marvel Comics. He is a recurring villain of the superhero team Alpha Flight.

== Publication history ==
Master of the World (Eshu) was created by writer-artist John Byrne and first appeared in Alpha Flight #2 (September 1983), as part of Alpha Flight's debut as a standalone title after the team's earlier appearances in X-Men.

Byrne introduced the character as a large-scale threat designed to challenge the entire Alpha Flight team. The character's origin — a prehistoric caveman experimented on by alien Plodex technology over 40,000 years — gave him a distinctive place in the Marvel Universe as an ancient, highly evolved villain with both physical and technological superiority.

The character returned in several subsequent Alpha Flight story arcs under different writers, including during the series' later runs in the 1980s and 1990s. He also crossed over into other Marvel titles, appearing against the Avengers and the Heroes for Hire. These appearances established his role as a recurring threat beyond the Alpha Flight corner of the Marvel universe. The character reappeared in the 2011 Alpha Flight limited series by Greg Pak and Fred Van Lente, where he served as the primary antagonist behind the Unity Party storyline. He also returned in the "Civil War II" crossover event in 2016–2017.

== Fictional character biography ==
Forty thousand years ago, a caveman warrior named Eshu was cast out of his tribe in what is now northern Asia after he killed another caveman against his tribe's laws. He wanders the Earth and is soon psionically called to the beacon of an alien ship. Eshu is captured by the alien Plodex, who experiment on him and repeatedly dissect and reassemble his body. His intelligence increases over the years until his mind and body are developed to the peak of perfection. After some time, Eshu learns to access the ship's systems, allowing him to escape. Now calling himself the Master of the World, he captures Alpha Flight after luring them to the Arctic. The Master of the World is confronted by Namor and the Invisible Woman, during which his starship is destroyed. He escapes his ship via a submarine.

Using his knowledge of the alien technologies, the Master of the World gains control of Marrina Smallwood and her Plodex mate. The Master causes Marrina to revert to savagery and captures Namor and Alpha Flight's Puck. However, Puck tears the Master's helmet from his head, severely injuring him. The Master's submarine explodes, thwarting his plans to dominate the world.

The Master of the World escapes and enters a state of suspended animation, from which he is freed by Llan the Sorcerer. His next plan is to take over the Canadian government under the alias Joshua Lord, exploiting the chaos caused by the Super Power Registration Act. The Master also reforms Omega Flight to stop Alpha Flight from getting in his way.

The Master of the World finds James Hudson entrapped in a dimensional limbo. He resurrects Hudson as the Antiguard, intending for him to kill Alpha Flight. Guardian, with the help of his wife Heather Hudson, breaks from the Master's mental control. The Master seemingly kills himself to avoid being imprisoned.

The Master of the World is the founder of Strikeforce One, consisting of Amazon (a clone of She-Hulk), Behemoth (a clone of Hulk), Demi-God (a clone of Hercules), Dragonfist (a clone of Iron Fist), Knight Errant (a clone of Black Knight who wields a flaming sword), She-Cat (a clone of White Tiger), and Stinger (a clone of Ant-Man). Strikeforce One proves to be difficult opponents for Heroes for Hire, who turn the tide against them. The Master escapes while Strikeforce One is presumed dead.

The Master of the World seemingly dies again, at the hands of Warbird, when she kills him so that the Avengers can use his weapons to help attack Kang the Conqueror's forces. Although Warbird requests that she be tried for the Master's death, a tribunal headed by Captain America concludes that there would be no punishment, as Warbird was acting out of necessity.

During the "Fear Itself" storyline, it was revealed that Master of the World was behind the motives of the Unity Party, which had been targeting Alpha Flight. When Alpha Flight escapes from Department H, the Master forces Vindicator and Department H to assemble Alpha Strike (consisting of Persuasion, Ranark the Ravager, a Wendigo, and a brainwashed Citadel) to spread the Unity program and take down Alpha Flight. At the end of the Alpha Flight 2011 series, he is seemingly killed in a battle with Alpha Flight.

During the "Civil War II" storyline, Master of the World resurfaces and assumes the alias of Phillipe Beaulieu, working for the Board of Governors for the Alpha Flight Space Program representing Canada. Master of the World plans to corrupt the evidence in order to isolate Captain Marvel and gain control of the justice system. When it is discovered that Aurora was framed and Captain Marvel confronts Phillipe Beaulieu, he sheds his disguise. After obtaining Thundersword's sword, Master of the World battles Captain Marvel until Thundersword appears and reclaims his sword.

== Powers and abilities ==
The Master of the World is approximately 40,000 years old. After he was experimented on by the Plodex ship, he underwent the reconstruction of his entire body (except for his brain) by Plodex technology, granting him superhuman powers. The master has the agility beyond that of a normal human, which he gained after he altered his body. He has enhanced reflexes, that were fast enough to slice Warbird with a sword. His speed can reach 61–65 mph (105 km/h). His stamina is so high that he can sustain peak physical exertion for several hours before fatigue impairs performance. Also, his strength is enhanced, and he was able to break Sasquatch's arm by, after dodging Sasquatch's attack, grabbing it with both hands and breaking it. He is also a master of hand-to-hand combat, as he learned the techniques 40,000 years ago, retaining his knowledge of hand-to-hand combat from his days as a tribal warrior. He knows all human pressure points, which was shown when he knocked out Namor the Sub-Mariner with a single punch. The Master is virtually immortal, having lived for forty thousand years; although not invulnerable, he ages at a very slow rate. The Master was once mentally integrated with his Plodex starship base, so that he was physically unable to leave it until it was destroyed in a conflict with Alpha Flight. He then underwent further reconstruction of his entire body by a mutagenic fluid concocted from the remains of Scramble the Mixed-Up Man.

=== Equipment ===
Master of the World's suit also has many benefits, allowing him teleportation and flight. His helmet and battlesuit are composed of an unknown metal, including cybernetic mesh enabling the Master to control Plodex technology through mental commands. Devices within the Master’s helmet and battlesuit enable him to cast illusions disguising his appearance. He is able to create a force field that can ward off attacks. Also, he is able to shoot energy blasts with his suit, and it enables him to disperse electromagnetism, which was shown when he was able to control Guardian's suit. The Master designed this battlesuit using his knowledge of Plodex technology. He is self-educated in all recorded knowledge of Earth humanity up to the present, and of the alien Plodex (as of forty thousand years ago) through mental linkage with computers in the starship base. He has utilized various skycraft and underwater craft.
