= List of unproduced X-Men film series projects =

Unmade X-Men superhero films and television series

Film series logo used from 2014 to 2020

X-Men is an American media franchise based on the Marvel Comics superhero team of the same name. In March 2019, The Walt Disney Company acquired the film and television rights for the X-Men after the acquisition deal of 21st Century Fox was completed. The films in development under 20th Century Fox were placed "on hold" and eventually canceled by Disney. Fox had several projects in development that had not been made, were in development hell, or were redeveloped with different directions.

== Films ==
=== Bryan Singer's X-Men 3 ===
In July 2004, Bryan Singer, the director of the first two X-Men films, left the production of the third film in favor of developing Superman Returns for Warner Bros. Pictures. Singer stated that he "didn't fully have X-Men 3 in my mind" in contrast to a fully formed idea for a Superman film and interest in joining that franchise. By the time of his departure, Singer had only produced a partial story treatment with X2 screenwriters Dan Harris and Michael Dougherty, who accompanied him to Superman Returns. The treatment focused on Jean Grey's resurrection, which would also introduce the villainess Emma Frost, a role intended for Sigourney Weaver. Frost was an empath manipulating Jean's emotions in the treatment and, like the finished film, Magneto desires to control her. Overwhelmed by her powers, Jean kills herself, but Jean's spirit survives and becomes a god-like creature, which Dougherty compared to the star child in A Space Odyssey.

=== X-Men Origins: Magneto ===
In December 2004, 20th Century Fox hired screenwriter Sheldon Turner to draft a spin-off X-Men film, and he chose to write Magneto, pitching it as "The Pianist meets X-Men". According to Turner, the script he penned was set from 1939 to 1955, following Magneto trying to survive in Auschwitz. He meets Xavier, a young soldier, during the liberation of the camp. He hunts down the Nazi war criminals who tortured him, and this lust for vengeance turns him and Xavier into enemies. In April 2007, David S. Goyer was hired to direct. The film was to take place mostly in flashbacks with actors in their twenties, with Ian McKellen's older Magneto as a framing device, and some usage of the computer-generated facelift applied to him in the prologue of X-Men: The Last Stand, McKellen reiterated his hope to open and close the film. Magneto was planned to shoot in Australia for a 2009 release. By June 2008, the project was seeking approval to film in Washington, D.C., and Goyer later said that filming would begin if X-Men Origins: Wolverine was successful. The story was moved forward to 1962 and involves Xavier and Magneto battling a villain.

In 2009, Ian McKellen confirmed that he would not be reprising his role as Magneto in the film citing his age, and Lauren Shuler Donner stated that the film might never be made, saying it was "at the back of the queue" in the studio's priorities. Both Donner and Bryan Singer have stated that Magneto would not be produced as the plot of X-Men: First Class "superseded" the story of the planned film. Singer denied using Sheldon Turner's script for Magneto as inspiration to write his draft of First Class, but the Writers Guild of America arbitration still credited Turner for the film's story, while Jamie Moss and Josh Schwartz's collaborations ended up uncredited. In May 2019, First Class writer Zack Stentz revealed that Mister Sinister was the villain of Magneto, with the character being replaced by Sebastian Shaw in First Class.

=== X4 and X5 ===
In August 2006, producer Lauren Shuler Donner stated that a continuation of the X-Men main film series would require a renegotiation. New cast members of X-Men: The Last Stand were signed, while the older cast members were not. Donner said: "There is forty years worth of stories. I've always wanted to do Days of Future Past and there are just really a lot of stories yet to be told". She later pitched the idea of a fourth installment of the X-Men franchise to director Bryan Singer, following the completion of the 2011 prequel X-Men: First Class. In March 2011, Donner said the film was in "active development at Fox": "We took the treatment to Fox and they love it ... And X4 leads into X5".

=== Untitled Fox–Marvel crossover film ===
In 2010, Zack Stentz and Ashley Edward Miller were to co-write an ensemble film featuring every Marvel Comics property whose film rights were owned by 20th Century Fox: the X-Men, the Fantastic Four, Daredevil, and Deadpool. The plot revolved around a superhero registration act, pitting various characters on opposite sides of the conflict, similar to the Civil War story arc. Paul Greengrass had been approached to serve as director, though scheduling conflicts placed the project indefinitely on hold. Warren Ellis worked separately on another draft of the script. Greengrass later stated that he was never contractually signed on to work on the project and that "in the end, nothing happened".

=== Juggernaut film ===
In 2010, Joe Carnahan mentioned in an interview around the premiere of The A-Team that he wrote a script around Juggernaut for 21st Century Fox, but it never came to fruition.

=== Matthew Vaughn's X-Men: First Class sequel ===
In May 2019, X-Men: First Class director Matthew Vaughn revealed in an interview he was initially signed to helm a trilogy of films starring the principal cast and characters introduced in the aforementioned film, with X-Men: Days of Future Past (2014) originally intended to be the third and concluding entry of his story arc as opposed to its direct sequel. His original plan for a First Class sequel was to develop a storyline that expanded the roles of supporting X-Men members such as Hank McCoy / Beast, Sean Cassidy / Banshee and Emma Frost, all of whom were envisioned as carrying the more optimistic and playful tone of First Class and its period piece setting when contrasted with the original X-Men film trilogy. Vaughn's sequel was similarly set in the 1970's, and was also set to feature a younger James "Logan" Howlett / Wolverine, with Tom Hardy being named by Vaughn as someone he'd ideally cast in the role. The filmmaker was originally hired to screenwrite and direct Days of Future Past and revealed that a positive response from Fox executives over his finished screenplay draft convinced them to prioritize said film over his envisioned First Class sequel. This decision would contribute to Vaughn's departure from Days of Future Past as its director in October 2012 alongside his desire to focus on Kingsman: The Secret Service (2014). Bryan Singer was hired by Fox to replace him days later, returning to the franchise for the first time since X2. Days of Future Past in its theatrically released form would additionally retcon First Class as a prequel to the original X-Men as opposed to a franchise reboot as originally planned.

=== Tim Miller's Deadpool 2 ===
In April 2016 during that year's CinemaCon, 20th Century Fox officially announced development on Deadpool 2 (2018) had commenced with Reynolds returning to star as the eponymous character, and Tim Miller reprising his directorial duties from the first film. Miller would eventually clash with Reynolds over several creative aspects of the film's production, leading to his eventual departure from the project that October, although the split was still reported to be on amicable terms. Miller would open up on his decision to leave the film in 2019, including discussion on the differences in his vision for the film and where he found himself creatively disagreeing with Reynolds. This principally included Miller and Reynolds having different criteria for who would be cast as the character Cable after his appearance in the sequel was set up by the first film's post-credits scene. Miller intended to seek a taller actor who met the visual resemblance for the character's 6 foot-7 inches height in the comics, with Kyle Chandler reported to be the director's frontrunner for the role while Josh Brolin would ultimately be cast as the character under Reynolds' direction. Miller also screen tested numerous white actresses for the role of Domino such as Lizzy Caplan, Mary Elizabeth Winstead, Sienna Miller and Ruby Rose among others, despite the producers and Reynolds preferring a Black or Latina actress being cast, as Zazie Beetz secured the role following Miller's departure. Miller's version of the film also refrained from killing off Vanessa Carlysle and had instead planned to depict her transformation into the mutant Copycat as in the comics, which was expected to expand on her romantic relationship with Wade Wilson and provide her with more direct agency over the plot than the finished film. Miller's version of Deadpool 2 also involved a supporting appearance from the Fantastic Four, with plans for Miles Teller, Michael B. Jordan, Kate Mara and Jamie Bell to reprise their respective roles from the 2015 film in an attempt to establish the characters in a shared universe with the X-Men as in the comics. Although the character Juggernaut appeared in the final film, Miller's version was intended to have him play a more significant role in the film's climax, where he would have featured in a major fight scene against Fantastic Four member Ben Grimm / Thing. Miller would explain that Reynolds' more direct influence over Deadpool 2's production and more favored creative influence led to his decision to depart the film, ultimately concluding that "Ryan's the face of the franchise, and he was the most important component of that, by far. So if he decides he wants to control it, then he's going to control it."

=== Films affected by Disney's acquisition of 21st Century Fox ===
After the acquisition of 21st Century Fox by The Walt Disney Company in 2019, which returned the X-Men rights to Marvel Studios, all X-Men films in development at Fox were cancelled, including X-Force and Deadpool 3.

==== Gambit ====
In October 2014, Josh Zetumer was hired to write the screenplay for a film about the character Remy LeBeau / Gambit, based on the treatment by comic-book writer Chris Claremont. Rupert Wyatt was then hired to direct in June 2015 but left in September due to schedule conflicts. In November, Doug Liman was hired to direct the film, but left the film in August 2016, to direct Justice League Dark, and also cited script issues. In August 2017, Channing Tatum, who signed on as the title character, stated that the script was in the process of being rewritten.

By October, Gore Verbinski had signed on as director, while Zetumer continued to work on the script. Verbinski departed the film in early 2018 due to scheduling issues. The film would have starred Channing Tatum with Donner, Kinberg, Tatum and Reid Carolin attached as producers. Kinberg said that the film was intended to be the start of multiple installments focusing on Gambit. During that time, Kinberg stated that the final script had been completed, production would have commenced in New Orleans by the third quarter of 2018 and the film was scheduled for release on March 13, 2020. In October, Daniel Woburn of Screen Rant opined that the film, which he described as being in development hell since 2014, was likely to be canceled once Disney's acquisition of Fox was complete since Marvel Studios would want to integrate the X-Men characters into the MCU. Lauren Shuler Donner revealed that Gambit, as well as the rest of the Fox Marvel films, were "on hold" until the Disney–Fox deal went through. In May 2019, the film was removed from the release schedule and officially cancelled. Tatum would later appear as the character in the Marvel Cinematic Universe films Deadpool & Wolverine (2024) and Avengers: Doomsday (2026) as a homage to the cancelled film.

==== Dark Phoenix sequels ====
Kinberg said in May 2016 that he planned for his directorial debut Dark Phoenix to be the first in a trilogy, spawning a new line of films focusing on the younger versions of the original X-Men characters. After the proposed acquisition of 21st Century Fox by Disney was announced in December 2017, Disney CEO Bob Iger said that the X-Men would be integrated with the MCU under Disney, resulting in a probable reboot of the X-Men franchise. The following year, Kinberg revealed that Marvel Studios President Kevin Feige had reviewed the script and tone of Dark Phoenix. In March 2019, Fox executive Emma Watts described Dark Phoenix as the final Fox X-Men film, ending development on the sequels.

==== The New Mutants sequels ====
In December 2016, Josh Boone and Knate Lee originally pitched The New Mutants to Kinberg as the first in a trilogy. In October 2017, Boone said that the characters Warlock and Karma would appear in the sequels, which he wanted to be "their own distinct kind of horror movies". In his description: "The first film is certainly the 'rubber-reality' supernatural horror movie. The next one would have been a completely different kind of horror movie. Our take was just go examine the horror genre through comic book movies and make each one its own distinct sort of horror film. Drawing from the big events that we love in the comics". He added that connections to the wider X-Men universe could have been explored more in future films. Boone and Lee revealed that they were interested in filming the first sequel in Brazil, and that Sunspot's father, Emmanuel da Costa, would have played a role in the franchise. Fox executive Emma Watts described The New Mutants as the final film in Fox's X-Men series, ending possibilities of sequels. In August 2020, Boone confirmed there were no plans to incorporate The New Mutants into the Marvel Cinematic Universe.

==== Laura / X-23 spin-off ====
In October 2017 following the release of Logan, the film's director and co-writer James Mangold confirmed that Fox was actively developing a spin-off film around Laura Kinney / X-23, portrayed by Dafne Keen, after the studio had been impressed by the critical and commercial success of the Warner Bros. Pictures film Wonder Woman (2017), which was considered a breakthrough for comic book films led by female protagonists. Writer Craig Kyle, who co-created the X-23 character for the animated series X-Men: Evolution (2000-03), was also revealed to be creatively involved in the project alongside Mangold himself, which was revealed to be tentatively titled Laura. In June 2023 during the press tour for Indiana Jones and the Dial of Destiny (2023), Mangold confirmed that while he had produced a rough story outline, the film was among the X-Men projects halted and canceled by Disney following its acquisition of 21st Century Fox, and that Disney had no intention of reviving the film or continue doing anything in relation to Fox's film series. Keen would go on to reprise her role as a grown-up Laura in the Marvel Cinematic Universe film Deadpool & Wolverine (2024).

==== Alpha Flight and Exiles ====
In early 2017, Kinberg revealed that 20th Century Fox had been focusing on developing ideas for future mutant-based teams that could expand the film series. He added that the Alpha Flight and Exiles were the teams being developed for a film adaptation. There have been no further announcements since.

==== Multiple Man ====
In November 2017, a film centering around Jamie Madrox / Multiple Man was in development, with James Franco starring as the titular character. Allan Heinberg signed on to the project as screenwriter with Simon Kinberg and Franco attached as co-producers. There have been no further development news.

==== Kitty Pryde ====
In January 2018, a Kitty Pryde solo film was reported to be in development, with Tim Miller attached as the director and Brian Michael Bendis writing the script.

==== X-Men: Fear the Beast ====
X-Men: Fear the Beast was the title of a spin-off film pitched by Byron Burton, former assistant to editor/composer John Ottman while he was working on X-Men: Apocalypse. Ottman was skeptical of the idea that Beast could carry his own film, but when Burton said he could complete a script in two weeks, Ottman gave the aspiring screenwriter a chance to prove the idea could work.

After reading Burton's draft, Ottman decided to join the project and rework the script as a $90 million film. Fear the Beast would have been set in the late 1980s, opening in a snow-covered Inuit village that was being stalked by a mysterious creature. Ottman likened the film to John Carpenter's The Thing, due to both settings involving an "inhospitable environment". The story would then jump forward to Hank McCoy living in the X-Mansion, where he would be struggling to keep his mutation under control with a serum that was introduced in X-Men: Days of Future Past. His beastly nature surfaced during a Danger Room sequence, where the Friends of Humanity would have also made an appearance. Early in the first act, it would be revealed that Hank had been helping a scientist with a similar mutation known as Dr. Paul Cartier.

Hank provided Cartier with a sample of his serum, but would later discover that he was the one terrorizing the Inuit village at the start of the film as the Wendigo. It would culminate in a showdown where Hank teamed up with Wolverine, who was located by Professor X using Cerebro. Fear the Beast ended with a tease of Mister Sinister having watched all of the proceedings. This was going to be a setup for Sinister being a multi-film villain orchestrating things.

Ottman passed the idea around to people at 20th Century Fox, but because Fear the Beast involved core X-Men characters such as Professor X and Beast, the film needed to be signed off by Simon Kinberg. Kinberg was the key architect behind the X-Men films and was working on Dark Phoenix at the time. He politely declined to read the script to avoid being influenced by it, as he had plans to reintroduce Wolverine into the X-Men films after Hugh Jackman retired from the role. As such, Wolverine being used in any other film would have muddled Kinberg's plans. However, Ottman didn't mind as he would have pushed to direct the film himself had Fox been interested.

Ottman was constantly reworking the script to avoid any problems that would have shown up in post-production. Both Ottman and Burton noted that the version of Fear the Beast they originally pitched was an early draft that would have changed over time.

==== Omega Red ====
An outline of an Omega Red film was written by Byron Burton and John Ottman. It was planned to be a follow-up to X-Men: Fear the Beast, which teased Mister Sinister as a multi-arc villain orchestrating events behind-the-scenes. It would have been set in the late 1980s and involved Sinister testing the X-Men.

==== X-Force ====
20th Century Fox announced an X-Force film in July 2016. Jeff Wadlow was hired to write and direct the adaptation in July 2013. Lauren Shuler Donner and Matthew Vaughn signed on as producers. In December, Rob Liefeld confirmed that Cable and Deadpool would be appearing in the film. The film was planned to be released sometime in 2017. A piece of concept art shows Cable, Domino, Warpath, Cannonball, and Feral as members of the team. After the release of Deadpool, Reynolds felt that Deadpool would soon be in an X-Force film, and Kinberg stated that there was potential for X-Force to be R-rated like Deadpool in contrast to the PG-13 "mainline X-Men movies". Bryan Singer said in an interview with Fandango that he would like to see X-23 to appear in the film as the new Wolverine. In addition, Psylocke was rumored to appear in the film as she is a very prominent member of the team in the comic books; however, actress Olivia Munn (who plays Psylocke in the film X-Men: Apocalypse) did not address these rumours. Kinberg said that the film was still on their schedule. In 2017, Ryan Reynolds co-wrote the script with Joe Carnahan. In September, Drew Goddard was brought on to write and direct X-Force. The shooting of the film was expected to begin in October 2018 before the Disney/Fox deal could be finalised.

Following the release of Deadpool 2 in May 2018, co-writer Rhett Reese confirmed the X-Force film would be an R-rated take on X-Men and would have "all the sex, violence, and silliness one would expect from the Deadpool-skewed militarized mutant force". Reese said, "They can get their hands dirty a little bit. There's more gray area. It'll be raunchier, it'll be rated R, I'm sure. We'll get to see an ensemble movie that's pushed, hopefully, as far as the Deadpool individual movie was pushed". In January 2019, all Fox Marvel properties were postponed until the Disney–Fox deal closed; which eventually happened on March 20.

==== Fox's Deadpool 3 ====
By November 2016, with development underway on Deadpool 2, Fox was also planning a third Deadpool film which was said to feature the X-Force team. With the confirmation that Leitch would direct Deadpool 2, Fox was looking for a separate filmmaker to direct Deadpool 3. Reese clarified that though Deadpool 2 sets up the X-Force team, a future film focused on the team would be separate from Deadpool 3: "[X-Force] is where we're launching something bigger, but then [Deadpool 3 is] where we're contracting and staying personal and small".

After the release of the second film, Reynolds stated that a third might not be made, given the franchise's shift of focus to X-Force, though Reese and Wernick felt a third film would "absolutely" be happening after Reynolds took a break from the character and X-Force was released, which they compared to the Iron Man franchise releasing Iron Man 3 (2013) after the crossover film The Avengers (2012). Leitch expressed interest in returning to the franchise. In January 2021, Reynolds revealed that the plot of the film would have involved Deadpool and Wolverine going on a road trip, in the style of the film Rashomon.

== Television series ==
=== Hellfire ===
In October 2015, a series titled Hellfire was under development by 20th Century Fox Television and Marvel Television with an early 2017 air date. It would have been based on the Hellfire Club. By July 2016, the project was no longer moving forward and the network made a put pilot commitment for a different X-Men based series.
