= Talisman (Alpha Flight) =

- Cover art for Alpha Flight #19. Art by John Byrne.

Publication information
- Publisher: Marvel Comics
- First appearance: Alpha Flight #5 (December 1983)
- Created by: John Byrne

In-story information
- Alter ego: Elizabeth Twoyoungmen
- Species: Human
- Team affiliations: Omega Flight; Alpha Flight; Beta Flight
- Notable aliases: The Binder of Spirits, The Breaker of Dark Spells, The Promised One
- Abilities: Wide-ranging magical abilities

Talisman (Elizabeth Twoyoungmen) is a fictional Canadian superhero appearing in American comic books published by Marvel Comics. She was created by John Byrne, and first appeared in Alpha Flight #5 (December, 1983). She appears as a member of Alpha Flight and its spinoff teams.

Elizabeth is the daughter of Alpha Flight member and magician Shaman. She possesses a variety of magical abilities from the Coronet of Enchantment which she wears on her head.

== Publication history ==
She first appeared as Elizabeth Twoyoungmen in Alpha Flight #5 (December 1983). The character was created by John Byrne.

Elizabeth initially appeared as a college student in six issues before joining Alpha Flight in issue #20 as Talisman. She left the team soon after, returning for revenge on her father, and then later returning to the team. She appeared in the limited series Omega Flight (2007) as a member of the titular team, as well as making appearances in the Amazing X-Men arc "World War Wendigo", and Doctor Strange (Vol. 4) as one of the many magicians aiding the sorcerer.

== Fictional character biography ==
Elizabeth Twoyoungmen was born in Calgary, Alberta, Canada, the daughter of Michael Twoyoungmen (who would later be the superhero Shaman of the Canadian superhero team Alpha Flight) and his wife Kathryn. Elizabeth became estranged from her father at the age of four after the death of her mother following an illness. Michael, a physician, had promised Elizabeth he would save Kathryn, and his failure led Elizabeth to be bitter and resentful toward him.

As a college archaeology student, Elizabeth was excavating the site of the original Fort Calgary when she discovered a skull. When she touched it, an apparition appeared that only she could see. Frightened, she sought out her father, whom she recognized as Shaman despite a spell he had cast to prevent himself from being recognized. Together they investigated the skull, determining that it was the source of ancient anger or ancient evil.

Meanwhile, a young woman named Emily Stang was tending to her great-grandfather, Lucas Stang, when she was attacked by a mystical force manifesting itself through scrambled eggs (eggs being both a symbol of new life and a symbol of potential life unfulfilled). Shaman and Elizabeth traveled to the site of the manifestation, and Shaman seemingly defeated it. However, the force again manifested itself, this time through Lucas, and possessed Emily. As the possessed Emily attacked Elizabeth, Shaman identified it as Ranaq the Devourer, one of the Great Beasts of the North. Under Ranaq's barrage, Elizabeth found herself growing stronger until she was able instinctively to turn the force of Ranaq's attack back against it. Shaman launched an attack on Ranaq as well, and together they drove the beast out of Emily, saving her life. Shortly thereafter, Elizabeth reached into Shaman's mystical medicine pouch at his bidding and withdrew a coronet (later identified as the "Coronet of Enchantment"). Placing it on her brow, she was transformed into Talisman, with the power to manipulate vast magical energies and command the spirits of nature to do her will. She then became a member of Alpha Flight. She was horrified to later learn that she was unable to remove the coronet without enduring unbearable, agonizing pain.

Alongside Alpha Flight, she later fought the rest of the Great Beasts. She was captured by the original Omega Flight and became trapped in the void within Shaman's mystic pouch. She was rescued by the Beyonder and subsequently quit Alpha Flight. Her natural arrogance magnified by her newfound powers as well as the Coronet of Enchantment's influence, and with her bitterness toward her father rekindled — both by his failure to tell her about the coronet and his failure to save her from being consumed by the Void within his medicine pouch — Talisman became corrupted by her powers. She took the impending birth of fellow Alphan Snowbird's first child as her opportunity for revenge on him. She commanded the spirits to lead Shaman to a place of power required for the birth that was also a place of death, intending to let the malevolent spirit trapped there to defeat her father before saving the day herself. However, the spirit trapped there had never truly died, and so was beyond her power to bind. Possessing Snowbird's baby and calling himself Pestilence, the malevolent entity attacked Alpha Flight and tore the coronet from Talisman's brow, thus restoring Elizabeth's humanity. However, in the continuing battle, Shaman donned the coronet, claiming the name and powers of Talisman, and forced Pestilence to flee.

=== Omega Flight ===
In the aftermath of the Civil War of American superheroes, some of their enemies fled north to Canada. To combat this threat, Sasquatch began recruiting for a new team to protect the borders. While initially refusing to join this new Omega Flight, Talisman is spurred into action by Sasquatch's capture, returning to Ottawa to meet with the rest of the team. After angrily accusing Iron Man of bringing the supervillain crisis about through the bitter conflict of the Superhuman Civil War, Elizabeth is horrified to learn that Michael Pointer, the man who killed Alpha Flight, has been selected as the new Guardian. Angry that a murderer and an American is wearing a Canada-inspired costume, Talisman refuses to have anything to do with the former thrall of the Collective. She leaves him behind as the rest of the team goes to Toronto to fight the Wrecking Crew. Aiding the team in their battle against the Great Beasts-empowered Crew and their Surtur demon allies, Elizabeth hesitates when confronted by a Tanaraq-possessed Sasquatch, but she is saved by Guardian's timely arrival. Finally seeing that he was truly remorseful for the indirect role he played in the destruction of Alpha Flight and his outright refusal to kill Sasquatch when he was possessed, Elizabeth finally forgives Pointer. During the series, Talisman is shown wearing Shaman's medicine bag, which she likely inherited after her father's death at the hands of the Collective.

Some time later, Elizabeth and her longtime teammate and mentor, Puck, became lovers.

== Powers and abilities ==
Talisman possesses vast supernatural powers as a result of her descent from forty generations of Sarcee shamans, and was once described as "a mortal channel through which the gods can fight", as well as "a director of forces, not a combatant". Her father, Shaman, has stated that her powers when properly developed would rival even that of the Sorcerer Supreme, Doctor Strange. Primary among her powers is the ability to command the Spirits of the Land to do her bidding, meaning she is literally part of the Spirit World itself. While Shaman could only implore the Spirits for help, Talisman can command them outright. She has the ability to tap into mystical forces and to manipulate them for a variety of effects, including levitation, astral projection, exorcism, matter manipulation, the ability to see prophetic visions, telepathy, teleportation over vast distances, opening inter-dimensional portals, animating the undead, generating wind blasts and lightning, summoning air spirits, calling forth spirit animals, creating magical shields of light, and generating blasts of magical energy. She also has the ability to perceive various mystical phenomena. She possesses considerable knowledge of the mystic arts of the Sarcee.

Most of Talisman's powers stem from the ancient Coronet of Enchantment, which she wears on her forehead. However, even without the Coronet, she has shown to possess the ability to absorb and redirect magical energy used against her, but the Coronet greatly amplifies her powers. Talisman cannot remove the Coronet without it causing her severe mental pain (and it took a great effort from others to remove it). However, if someone else wears it, returning the Coronet to the true owner would spare them the pain. When out of costume, Talisman can use an illusion to hide the presence of the Coronet. Talisman stated in Omega Flight #5 that she "no longer has the blessings she once had", making her level of power unclear.

Following the death of her father, Talisman possesses also Shaman's medicine bag, which contains a pocket dimension known as the Void. She can summon all manner of mystical objects and potions from the bag.

== Other characters named Talisman ==
Nahita / Talisman was a previous wearer of the Coronet of Enchantment and a member of the Tribe of the Moon.

After Elizabeth Twoyoungmen was initially corrupted by her power, Shaman temporarily seized the Coronet of Enchantment, assuming the name and powers of Talisman.

In the mini-series Contest of Champions, where the Grandmaster and Death use the heroes of earth for a contest, a character named Talisman was from Australia, a member of an Aboriginal tribe, who used a mystic "bullroarer" to create various mystical effects, such as disorientate opponents.

== Reception ==
- Screen Rant ranked Talisman 7th in "Marvel’s 15 Most Powerful Magical Superheroes".
- ComicBook.com included Talisman in their list "7 Great Marvel Magic Characters Still Not in the MCU".
- Nerdist included Talisman in "The Marvel Witches We Want to See in AGATHA: DARKHOLD DIARIES".
- CBR included Talisman in their list "Marvel: 10 Characters Whose Main Power Is Magic".
