= Shaman (Marvel Comics) =

Fictional character in Marvel Comics

- Shaman (second from left) on the cover of Alpha Flight #27, October 1985. Art by John Byrne.

Publication information
- Publisher: Marvel Comics
- First appearance: The Uncanny X-Men #120 (April 1979)
- Created by: John Byrne

In-story information
- Alter ego: Michael Twoyoungmen
- Species: Human
- Team affiliations: Alpha Flight
- Notable aliases: The Binder of Spirits, The Breaker of Dark Spells, The Promised One, Talisman
- Abilities: Levitation; Medicine bag which contains a pocket dimension; Ability to summon anything needed from the bag and beseech spirits to fulfill his requests; As Talisman: Vast magic manipulation; Ability to command natural spirits to do his will

Shaman (Michael Twoyoungmen) is a fictional superhero appearing in American comic books published by Marvel Comics. The character is usually depicted as a member of Alpha Flight and is the father of fellow member Talisman.

== Publication history ==
Shaman was created by John Byrne and first appeared in Uncanny X-Men in the 120th issue of the comic in April 1979.

== Fictional character biography ==
Michael Twoyoungmen is from Calgary, Alberta, and is a member of Canada's First Nations (specifically the Tsuu T'ina).

His grandfather, elderly and near death, asks him to become his mystical apprentice. Twoyoungmen, not believing in magic, refuses. At around the same time, his wife Kathryn Twoyoungmen becomes terminally ill. Twoyoungmen desperately seeks a cure but, despite promising his daughter Elizabeth he would find one, Kathryn dies; his grandfather dies on the very same day.

Grief-stricken, Twoyoungmen secludes himself in a cabin in Banff National Park, leaving Elizabeth to be raised by family friends the McNeils (whose daughter Heather later becomes Alpha Flight leader Vindicator). Twoyoungmen's failure to save Kathryn kindles a deep-seated resentment and anger in Elizabeth. In his cabin, Twoyoungmen receives the skull of his grandfather and experiences a vision of the man. Twoyoungmen studies Sarcee magic, eventually becoming strong enough in his beliefs to draw mystical items from his enchanted medicine bag at will. He adopts the title and regalia of a shaman.

Several years later, Shaman assists in the birth of Snowbird, the product of a mystical union between a human and the Inuit goddess Nelvanna. Shaman casts spells to bind Snowbird to the Earthly realm. He raises her and she ages rapidly, stabilizing several weeks later at an apparent physical age of someone in their 20s. Seeking superhuman agents to join Alpha Flight, Heather and her husband James Hudson (aka Alpha Flight founder Guardian) visit Shaman and recruit both him and Snowbird.

A few years after Shaman joins Alpha Flight, his daughter Elizabeth discovers a skull at an archeological site and experiences a vision of Ranaq the Devourer, one of the Great Beasts. She summons her father— who she knows is Shaman despite his use of spells to conceal his identity—to examine the skull. The two then meet Lucas Stang and his great-granddaughter Emily. Emily is possessed by Ranaq and attempts to destroy Elizabeth, but instead activates her latent mystical powers, allowing Elizabeth to defeat the possessed woman. Shaman has Elizabeth reach into his medicine bag and withdraw the Coronet of Enchantment, a mystical circlet which she dons to become Talisman, a prophesied person of great mystical power. Shaman does not tell Talisman that the Coronet, once donned, cannot be removed without causing her intense agony. Shortly thereafter, Talisman is trapped in the pocket dimension contained within Shaman's medicine bag despite his promise that he will save her. Although she is later rescued by the Beyonder, this newest failed promise turns her resentment of Shaman into hatred.

Shaman's failure to save his daughter leads to a crisis of faith and Shaman is unable to draw mystical items from his medicine bag. Shaman embarks on a vision quest and learns anew the secrets of mysticism from the spirit of his grandfather. Shaman gains the power to beseech nature spirits for aid, although he can not command them as Elizabeth does. He also receives a staff and an eagle helm, which can transform into a familiar spirit.

When a pregnant Snowbird is about to give birth to her first child and the birth needs to happen at a place of power, Shaman beseeches the spirits to lead him to such a place. However, Talisman, corrupted by her power and fueled by her rage, compels the spirits to unknowingly lead Shaman and Alpha Flight to a place of evil instead. Snowbird's child is possessed by the spirit of a sailor who has lain under the permafrost for over a century. Calling himself Pestilence, he battles Alpha Flight. Talisman plans to allow Pestilence to defeat Alpha Flight and then step in to defeat him, humiliating her father. However, Talisman is unable to defeat Pestilence as he is only partially of the spirit world, having been preserved in ice, and is thus outside the influence of her powers. As they fight, he tears the Coronet of Enchantment from her brow. Shocked back to her senses, Elizabeth is devastated over what she has done and apologizes to her father. Shaman, believing it is the only way to save Alpha Flight, dons the Coronet and takes on the mantle and powers of Talisman. Shaman, who grew cold and distant as Talisman just as Elizabeth had, eventually relinquishes the Coronet to Elizabeth and takes up his original medicine bag and powers again. He continues to work with Alpha Flight again under the name Shaman.

Shaman, along with Major Mapleleaf, both Pucks, Guardian, and Vindicator, is brutally attacked by the Collective. Their bodies are left in the Yukon Territory as the Collective continues on to the United States. Shaman is later confirmed dead by Sasquatch.

During the "Chaos War" storyline, Shaman (alongside Guardian, Vindicator, and Marrina Smallwood) is among the heroes who return from the dead after Death leaves the Underworld.

In The Immortal Hulk, Shaman joins the group Gamma Flight, a variant of Alpha Flight. In Strange Academy, he joins the eponymous school as a teacher of spiritual studies.

== Powers and abilities ==
During his initial training with the spirit of his grandfather, Shaman underwent intensive physical and mental training and discipline. He gained the understanding of the Sacree medicine men was able to concentrate to the point of not just thinking of objects, but feeling or knowing them in order to draw them out of his medicine pouch. He was also able to run at full speed through the forest without disturbing the wildlife that lived there.

Shaman, as a fully trained doctor, also has knowledge of anatomy and intricate surgical and medical procedures. Before his training as a mystic, he was a surgeon in Canada.

Shaman is a magic-wielder who carries a medicine bag which contains a pocket dimension known as the Void. He can summon all manner of physical and mystical objects and potions from the bag.

Following his vision quest, Shaman gains the power to beseech spirits to fulfill his requests. He cannot force the spirits to obey. In this incarnation, Shaman carries a "spirit staff," which glows when he summons the spirits. He wears an "eagle helm," which can transform into an eagle which serves as his familiar spirit.

Shaman can levitate by manipulating ambient mystical energy, and fly riding the winds. He seemed to be mostly adept at flying vertically.

When Shaman takes on the role of Talisman, he acquires the power to command natural spirits to do his will. He can manipulate vast mystical energy for a wide variety of effects. He has since relinquished these powers.

== Other versions ==
=== Earth-2530 ===
On Earth-2530, Shaman is a member of Alpha North America.

=== Earth X ===
In the "Earth X" reality, Shaman is a member of Alpha Flight who had an encounter with the Six.

=== Ultimate Marvel ===
An original incarnation of Shaman appears in Ultimate X-Men. This version is John Proudstar, who had his mutant abilities enhanced by the drug Banshee.

=== What If ===
Shaman was featured in an issue of What If, which takes place in a universe where the All-New All-Different X-Men were never formed. He is seen as a member of Alpha Flight led by Wolverine.

== In other media ==
Shaman appears in the X-Men: The Animated Series episode "Repo Man", voiced by Don Francks.
