= Ranark the Ravager =

Comics character

Ranark is a supervillain appearing in American comic books published by Marvel Comics. Created by writer Tom DeFalco and artist Ron Wilson, the character first appeared in Marvel Two-in-One #83 (January 1982). Ranark is a Native American shaman known as Ranark the Ravager. He is a dark sorcerer capable of summoning the powers of the Great Beasts, transforming into a cloud or a murder of crows, and performing a wide range of magical feats. The character has been affiliated with the Master of the World at various points in his publication history. He has also faced both the Thing and the superhero team Alpha Flight.

== Publication history ==
Ranark the Ravager debuted in Marvel Two-in-One #83 (January 1982), created by Tom DeFalco and Ron Wilson. He also appeared in the 2011 Alpha Flight series.

== Fictional character biography ==
Ranark the Ravager is an ancient shaman whose spirit was imprisoned for centuries in a mystic urn by rival medicine men. Upon being freed, Ranark awakens in modern Canada and immediately begins a campaign of destruction. He first attacks a civilian couple in Saskatchewan, destroys Canadian Air Force jets, and later wreaks havoc on Winnipeg, forcing Alpha Flight and the Thing to intervene. Ranark is ultimately subdued when Northstar and Aurora combine their powers to stun him, allowing Shaman to trap his spirit in a mystic container once again.

== Powers and abilities ==
Ranark the Ravager stands approximately 20 feet tall, possesses immense strength, and is highly resistant to physical injury. He can fly, tunnel through earth, and—being a spirit—claims to be immortal. These characteristics are innate and require no apparent effort. Beyond these natural attributes, Ranark wields a wide array of shamanic abilities that require concentration and typically cannot be used simultaneously. These include controlling another person’s actions, reading memories, inflicting severe mental pain, altering his size and shape (including taking the form of a whirlwind), generating force fields, and manipulating earth, wind, and fire. He can also control plant life, trigger earthquakes, form giant hands out of earth, conjure storms, influence the weather, absorb and redirect electromagnetic energy, and project energy blasts. Ranark is furthermore able to transform into a murder of crows or a cloud-like form capable of transporting others. He can channel the powers of the Great Beasts, allowing him to produce ice, fire, sickness, and destructive clouds of energy.
