= Ranaq the Devourer =

Ranaq The Great Devourer

Publication information
- Publisher: Marvel Comics
- First appearance: Alpha Flight #14 (June 1984)
- Created by: John Byrne

In-story information
- Alter ego: Martin Preston
- Species: Great Beast
- Team affiliations: Great Beasts
- Notable aliases: The Great Devourer
- Abilities: Ability to possess and control of human beings; Longevity / decelerated aging; Energy projection; Illusion casting

Ranaq the Great Devourer is a character appearing in American comic books published by Marvel Comics. The character first appeared in Alpha Flight #6 (June 1984). Ranaq the Devourer is one of the Great Beasts who have fought the superhero team known as Alpha Flight.

== Fictional character biography ==
Ranaq, the Great Devourer, is one of the Great Beasts trapped in another dimension. He escaped in the early 20th century when Zebediah Chase forced a mystic to open the dimensional barrier, allowing Ranaq to possess Chase. The Alpha Flight (Puck, Shaman, Snowbird, and Talisman) delayed Ranaq until Lucas Stang shot Chase with a magic-dampening bullet, burying the body and learning he'd face Ranaq again in 100 years. A century later, an elderly Lucas confronted Ranaq, who had taken the form of his great-granddaughter, Emily. With Shaman and Elizabeth Twoyoungmen’s help, they defeated Ranaq and traveled back in time to ensure Lucas shot the host body again.

== Powers and abilities ==
Ranaq possesses immense magical power, which he can channel for both offensive and constructive purposes. He can fire destructive bolts of magic from his eyes and manipulate reality to make people's wishes manifest. While Ranaq can be summoned by skilled adepts, he can only remain on Earth by inhabiting a human host. In his human form, he is vulnerable to conventional harm, including being killed by a gunshot. When possessing a host, Ranaq has the ability to permanently destroy the host's mind. Known for his cunning, sly nature, and vengeful tendencies, Ranaq is a dangerous and manipulative entity.
