= Nemesis (Alpha Flight) =

- Amelia Weatherly as Nemesis from the pages of Alpha Flight.

Publication information
- Publisher: Marvel Comics
- First appearance: St. Ives; Alpha Flight #8 (March 1984); Thorne; Alpha Flight #76 (November 1989); Weatherly; Alpha Flight vol. 3 #1 (May 2004); Hudson; The Uncanny X-Men #139 (November 1980); Hudson (as Nemesis); Alpha Flight vol. 5 #1 (August 2023)
- Created by: St. Ives; John Byrne; Thorne; James Hudnall; Weatherly; Scott Lobdell; Hudson; Chris Claremont; John Byrne; Ed Brisson; Scott Godlewski

In-story information
- Alter ego: Isabel St. Ives; Jane Thorne; Amelia Weatherly; Heather MacNeil Hudson
- Species: St. Ives, Thorne and Weatherly: Undead; Hudson: Human
- Team affiliations: St. Ives, Weatherly and Hudson: Alpha Flight; Thorne: Alpha Flight; Children of the Night; Gamma Flight
- Abilities: St. Ives, Thorne and Weatherly: Use of a magical blade granting: Superhuman speed; Teleportation; Time travel; Flight; Longevity; Hudson: Use of a magical blade granting: Teleportation; Superhuman durability

Nemesis is the name of several superheroines appearing in American comic books published by Marvel Comics. The first incarnation of Nemesis, Isabel St. Ives, first appeared in Alpha Flight #8 (March 1984). The second incarnation, Jane Thorne, debuted in Alpha Flight #76 (November 1989). The third incarnation, Amelia Weatherly, made her first appearance in Alpha Flight vol. 3 #1 (May 2004). The fourth incarnation, Heather Hudson, made her debut as Nemesis in Alpha Flight vol 5. #1 (August 2023).

All four women have encountered the superhero team Alpha Flight team, and wore the same black and red costume, carried a mystical sword, and were capable of flight.

== Isabel St. Ives ==
Nemesis (Isabel St. Ives) first appeared in Alpha Flight #8, and was created by John Byrne.

=== Fictional character biography ===
Isabel St. Ives was the daughter of "Deadly" Ernest St. Ives, and used a magical sword "scarcely an atom's width thick," allegedly the only weapon capable of killing her father, to assist the Canadian superheroes Northstar and Aurora in combat with him. Although she apparently killed Deadly Ernest, he did return. There, the Flight member Puck used Nemesis's sword to fatally wound her father, who was then knocked in front of an oncoming subway train and apparently killed. Nemesis then explained to the heroes her relation to the villain and disintegrated.

== Jane Thorne ==
The second Nemesis, Jane Thorne, first appeared in Alpha Flight #76 and was created by writer James Hudnall.

=== Fictional character biography ===
Jane Thorne wore a costume identical to the first Nemesis, and used the original's sword and, on occasion, had used a teleportation device. Nothing about her past has been revealed, save that she once led a cult called the "Children of the Night".

The second Nemesis was introduced as a member of Canada's new government sanctioned team, Gamma Flight, and remained a member until the team was disbanded, at which point she fled to keep her teammate Wild Child from being placed in government custody. After Alpha Flight was reinstated, Wild Child, now a full member of Alpha Flight, rescued her from Rok, the new leader of the Children of the Night. She accompanied him to the Alpha Flight headquarters and became a member of Alpha Flight.

== Amelia Weatherly ==
=== Fictional character biography ===
The third Nemesis to be introduced was born in the early 19th century under the name Amelia Weatherly. She became the mistress of Centennial. She was killed under unknown circumstances involving a building burning down and was buried in a shallow grave. Although Centennial never found her body, he had a proper funeral for "the one thing he ever loved".

Somehow, after having "been to Hell – twice" she was revived as "the living embodiment of retribution", her dead body animated by the connection to her Promethium soulsword, Scell. When the sword is not held by her or sheathed close to her body, she can barely move.

Later, she was arrested by the Canadian Government as an anarchist terrorist and held until Sasquatch made a bargain for her release to join his new Alpha Flight lineup to save the originals – initially under coercion, with Sasquatch injecting her with nanotechnology capable of severing her connection to her sword, effectively killing her, if she attempted to kill any Alpha Flight member. While only Nemesis herself was aware of their connection, Centennial was also independently recruited by Sasquatch to the team.

After they helped to rescue the original team, Nemesis herself was the member keenest for the new team to remain assembled, since, while long-lived, she was not immortal and her life was coming to an end – although, visibly, she had not aged since her original death – and there was a matter she needed to attend to, which she couldn't do from prison. She eventually convinced Sasquatch to allow her freedom in return for remaining a member.

When Flashback then came to ask for help in preventing himself from being drawn back to his death in the past, Nemesis revealed she and her sword could time-travel – however, she didn't mention until after she'd done it that she would need to kill Flashback to do so. She justified it on the grounds that if they prevented the original problem – which Sasquatch identified as Guardian's original death – then she would never have needed to kill Flashback in the first place. She then proceeded to kill the members of Alpha Flight one-by-one, as their attempts to solve the problem made the present increasingly worse and required someone else to go back to alter the past further. When she stabbed them, they went to a "weigh station" inside herself where they would exit in the past with no memory of the time spent there.

When it was Centennial's turn to be stabbed and enter the station, she revealed herself to him at last as the mistress he'd truly loved, but said she couldn't tell him after she exited to reality, and after she sent everyone else (bar Sasquatch) back, she spent time cradling his dead body. When the time finally came to kill herself, she met herself in the final moments of her original life, suffering a "slow and painful death" in a shallow grave at the foot of a hill, topped with a flaming building, and briefly comforted herself.

When she arrived in the past, she killed Heather Hudson to prevent Guardian's death, which meant that the future Sasquatch became one where Guardian had spent ten years becoming the ruler of the world – and torturing Nemesis. Sasquatch, however, managed to persuade Shaman to reset the timeline so that the attempts at altering the past had never happened. The result was that Flashback came, not to prevent his own death, but to give Sasquatch Shaman's pouch, which yielded copies of the original Alpha Flight taken from shortly before Guardian's "death," with only Shaman and Nemesis herself remembering the erased timeline, whereupon Shaman convinced Nemesis to reveal herself to Centennial, so that when they died shortly after they were buried together.

When stunned, she starts talking about "fuzzy bunnies."

== Heather Hudson ==
The fourth Nemesis, Heather Hudson, made her debut in Alpha Flight vol. 5 #1 (August 2023), written by Ed Brisson and illustrated by Scott Godlewski. Heather was previously introduced in The Uncanny X-Men #139 (November 1980) and was created by Chris Claremont and John Byrne.

During the "Fall of X" storyline, Heather assumed the identity of Nemesis and rejoined Alpha Flight to help protect mutant refugees from the Canadian government. Her husband Guardian was unaware of her true identity, which is revealed to him after Heather is grievously wounded following a battle with Department H's Box Sentinels.

As Nemesis, Heather was only shown using Scell's ability to teleport. Unlike her predecessors, Scell grants Heather a certain level of superhuman durability that protects her from injuries that can otherwise be fatal. Due to Scell requiring the life-force of its victims to sustain itself, Heather's lack of victims with Scell causes the sword to drain her of her own life-force whenever she uses its teleportation abilities, worsening depending on the distance traveled and the number of people being teleported. As Scell's previous users were undead and able to bypass this weakness, Heather's continued use would result in her death.

== Reception ==
=== Accolades ===
- In 2020, Scary Mommy included Nemesis in their "Looking For A Role Model? These 195+ Marvel Female Characters Are Truly Heroic" list.
