= Snowbird (character) =

- Snowbird as depicted in Wolverine vol. 2 #172 (March 2002). Art by Sean Chen.

Publication information
- Publisher: Marvel Comics
- First appearance: Uncanny X-Men #120 (April 1979)
- Created by: John Byrne

In-story information
- Alter ego: Narya
- Species: Demigoddess (Inua/Human hybrid)
- Place of origin: Earth
- Team affiliations: Alpha Flight; The Flight; Royal Canadian Mounted Police; God Squad
- Notable aliases: Anne McKenzie; Anne McKenzie-Thompson; Ice Queen; Harfang
- Abilities: Mystical sense and resistance; Arctic animal shapeshifting; Superhuman strength; Compel others; Divine wisdom; Postcognition; Healing; Flight; Unarmed combat skills

Snowbird (Narya) is a superhero appearing in American comic books published by Marvel Comics. Created by John Byrne, the character first appeared in Uncanny X-Men #120 (April 1979). Snowbird is an Inuk demigoddess, being the daughter of a human and Nelvanna, the Inuk goddess of the Northern Skies. She has been depicted as a member of the Canadian superhero team Alpha Flight.

== Publication history ==
Snowbird first appeared in Uncanny X-Men #120 (April 1979) and was created by John Byrne. Byrne later revealed that, unlike most of the Alpha Flight lineup, she was a "fan character" who he created years before he began professional work in comics.

== Fictional character biography ==
Several thousand years before Snowbird's birth, the immensely powerful and malevolent Arctic spirit Tundra sealed the Northern gods — including the Inuk goddess Nelvanna — within a mystical barrier in another dimension, rendering them incapable of defending the mortal realm of Earth. Through clever persuasion and trickery, Nelvanna manipulated Tundra into removing her divinity so she could pass through the barrier. Nelvanna appeared before a mortal man named Richard Easton, insisting upon mating with him to produce a child who would grow to battle the evil, mystical "Great Beasts" of Canada. Easton reluctantly agreed, and the two conceived Snowbird sometime in the early 20th century, near Resolute Bay, Northwest Territories, Canada.

Michael Twoyoungmen, also known as Shaman, was chosen to serve as midwife to Nelvanna when she gave birth. Shaman named the child Narya, used a spell to bind her to the earthly realm, and agreed to raise her in his cabin in the Canadian wilderness. Narya grows quickly, becoming a fully adult woman in just six years. She learns to master various supernatural abilities, including the ability to transform into any animal native to Canada. In addition, she possesses the ability to fly, to sense mystic and magical power, limited precognition and postcognition, and a limited degree of super-strength. However, she is unable to leave Canada's borders without instantly falling ill due to the effects of the binding spell placed on her by Shaman.

When Shaman's friends, James Hudson and Heather Hudson, learn of Narya's powers and origin, they ask the two to join the Canadian super team the Flight, later known as Alpha Flight, under the codename "Snowbird". As a civilian cover, she is given the human identity of "Anne McKenzie" and trains to join the Royal Canadian Mounted Police, eventually working as a records officer in Yellowknife, Northwest Territories. Snowbird is eventually confronted by her new superior, Chief Inspector Hamilton, for repeated "unexcused absences" (which occurred as a result of her superhero activities) and is subsequently forced to break out of confinement to battle Kolomaq, one of the Great Beasts. Snowbird decides that she cannot be both a civilian and a superhero, and decides to abandon her human identity to focus entirely on Alpha Flight.

During her time as an officer, Snowbird falls in love with her workmate Douglas Thompson. After she entrusts him with her secret, she marries him and eventually has a child. For that, she is cast out by the other Inuit gods and stripped of her divine essence. Later, Snowbird is possessed by the villain Pestilence, who kills her family and tries to kill Alpha Flight. In a mine in Burial Butte, a town in the Canadian Klondike, Vindicator kills Snowbird with a plasma blast. Snowbird's spirit passes into the realm of the Inuit gods, but she refuses to enter until the gods admit her husband and child, which they eventually agree to. Pestilence continues to possess Snowbird's body until he is banished into Shaman's medicine pouch. The mind of Walter Langkowski (Sasquatch), who was at that point trapped in Smart Alec's body, is transferred into Snowbird's body, which is eventually altered to resemble his original self.

Snowbird is eventually resurrected by the gods who decide that they need a champion in the earthly realm and returns to active duty in Alpha Flight. Due to the magical effects of her rebirth, the spell preventing her from leaving Canada is removed.

During the Secret Invasion storyline, Snowbird is sent by her uncle Hodiak to be part of a team of gods dubbed the "God Squad", assembled by Hercules to battle the Skrull gods; if the Skrulls win, then the gods of humanity will be devoured or enslaved. When approached by the new Guardian Michael Pointer, she informs him that, due to Alpha Flight's demise, the end of her marriage, and the loss of the Great Beasts, she will not join the new Omega Flight team. When captured by Nightmare, it is revealed that her greatest fear is survivor's guilt for not being present at the battle between Pointer and Alpha Flight. During a battle with a group of gods who had been absorbed into the Skrull pantheon, Snowbird changes into Neooqtoq, the deadliest of the Great Beasts. In doing so, she loses her rational mind, attempting to kill anything in her way. She pulls in all the fallen gods and seemingly collapses into herself. At the last moment, Snowbird saves herself by transforming into a swarm of mosquitoes.

During the Chaos War storyline, Snowbird and Alpha Flight battle Amatusu-Mikaboshi's troops. She only just escapes from the Inuit gods' realm before her mother is killed. When she discovers that Sasquatch has brought the Great Beasts to Earth so they can kill Amatsu-Mikaboshi, she is furious and ends up freezing them, after which Mikaboshi impales them.

== Powers and abilities ==
Snowbird is a shapeshifter who possesses the ability to change into a pale white version of any creature native to the Canadian Arctic. She can draw additional mass from an unidentified and presumably mystical source when she takes the form of an animal whose mass and volume are greater than her own. When she takes the form of an animal whose mass and volume are less than those of a human being, she becomes a human-sized version of that animal. Some things she has transformed into are a swarm of mosquitoes, a sperm whale, Tanaraq (the true form of Sasquatch), and the monster Wendigo. She even transformed into a wolverine and beat Wendigo by ripping him to shreds. However, Snowbird's personality becomes overlaid with the character traits and instinctual patterns of whatever animal's form she is using at the time. Furthermore, the greater the amount of time she spends as a certain animal, the stronger the impression of that animal's psyche on her personality. If she remains in one form for an extended period of time, she risks having her personality fixed as that of the animal, and therefore of never transforming back. Also, transforming from one animal to another without first changing into her base form causes her great strain. However, both of these limitations have been reduced or removed following her resurrection: she has since been shown to talk in animal form, and she transformed from a mountain lion to Wendigo with no strain at all.

She can also transform into a female human being, although her true face is not human. In this form, she has blonde hair and blue eyes, but they are usually depicted as being solid black with white pupils. In her base form, Snowbird has superhuman strength, stamina, durability, agility, and reflexes. Snowbird possesses the ability of "postcognition" to envision events that happened up to six hours in the past in her immediate present vicinity. She can replay events in the area, but only she is capable of seeing them. After a battle with the Great Beast Kolomaq, Snowbird was badly wounded when suddenly a "healing glow" came over her and all her wounds were instantly healed. Many years after her death, Alpha Flight found Snowbird in a cylinder in the A.I.M. headquarters. They rescued her and determined that she has an advanced form of cellular rejuvenation. Once she was buried and began to decay, this regeneration process was initiated and carried to fruition over a considerable length of time. She also has the ability to fly. Snowbird has all the knowledge and wisdom of the gods of the Arctic. Being a mystical creature herself, she can pick up and sense various mystical activities from various places. She has mystical senses enabling her to detect the presence of magical energies or the breaching of a magical field. She can also resist teleportation. Talisman of Alpha Flight tried and failed to teleport her back to their headquarters.

Shaman's binding process initially restricted her from leaving Canada; upon doing so she would become weaker, although she once went to the United States with the X-Men and was not affected. This restriction was temporarily lifted by Hodiak when Snowbird joined the God Squad.

== Reception ==
=== Critical reception ===
Deirdre Kaye of Scary Mommy called Snowbird a "role model" and "truly heroic". Screen Rant included Snowbird in their "10 Marvel Comics Gods Who Should Join The MCU Next" list. CBR.com ranked Snowbird 4th in their "10 Most Powerful Members of Canada's Avengers" list, 7th in their "13 Most Powerful Marvel Demigods" list, and 10th in their "10 Most Powerful Canadians In Comics" list.

== Other versions ==
=== Marvel Zombies ===
A zombified alternate universe version of Snowbird from Earth-2149 appears in Marvel Zombies.

=== Ultimate Marvel ===
An alternate universe version of Snowbird appears in the Ultimate Marvel universe. This version is able to manipulate wind, through which she can fly and create blizzards.

== In other media ==
Snowbird appears in X-Men: The Animated Series, voiced by Melissa Sue Anderson. This version is a member of Alpha Flight.
