= Wendigo (comics) =

Fictional character from Marvel Comics

- The Wendigo on the cover to The Uncanny X-Men #140, art by John Byrne and Terry Austin.

Publication information
- Publisher: Marvel Comics
- First appearance: The Incredible Hulk (vol. 2) #162 (April 1973)
- Created by: Steve Englehart; Herb Trimpe

In-story information
- Alter ego: Several individuals
- Team affiliations: Varies per individual
- Notable aliases: Various names in Native Canadian folklore
- Abilities: Superhuman strength, stamina, durability, speed, and senses; Regeneration; Hardened fangs and claws

The Wendigo (occasionally: Wen-Di-Go) is a fictional monster appearing in American comic books published by Marvel Comics. The Marvel character is based on the Wendigo legend of the Algonquian peoples. The monster first appeared in The Incredible Hulk (vol. 2) #162 (April 1973), created by writer Steve Englehart and artist Herb Trimpe, fighting the Incredible Hulk. The Wendigo is a silver-furred Bigfoot-like creature with a prehensile tail that is not one specific person, but instead is the manifestation of a curse that can strike anyone who commits an act of cannibalism in the Canadian North Woods. Originally only one person can become the Wendigo at the time, which has led to one Wendigo being cured if another person was struck with the curse. In later years, it has been revealed that a pack of Wendigos lived in the Bering Strait. While normally depicted as a savage beast with no control, some Wendigos have appeared as part of various villainous groups, showing some restraint when not fighting.

The Wendigo character has also appeared in media outside comics, including animated series and video games.

== Publication history ==
The Wendigo first appeared in The Incredible Hulk (vol. 2) #162 (April 1973), and was created by Steve Englehart and Herb Trimpe. Englehart recalled: "I knew about the legend of the Wendigo, and thought, between his strength and his sad story, that he sounded like a good Hulk opponent".

== Fictional character biography ==
Several people have been afflicted with the curse of the Wendigo, including Paul Cartier, Georges Baptiste, Francois Lartigue, Lorenzo, Mauvais and others.

The curse is regional to the woods of Northern Canada and takes place, under the right conditions, when a person in the forests of Canada feeds on human flesh. This "curse of the Wendigo" was created by the Northern Gods (also known as the Inua) in an effort to deter human cannibalism.

The cannibal transforms into a superhumanly strong, nearly indestructible, fur-covered monster: the Wendigo. They then roam the woods eating human beings. The Wendigo frequently fights the Hulk, Wolverine, and Alpha Flight. Paul Cartier transforms into the Wendigo, battles the Hulk, and escapes. He battles the Hulk again and encountered Wolverine, and then battles both. Cartier is cured when college professor Georges Baptiste becomes the Wendigo.

Baptiste later terrorizes a snowbound group. He battles Wolverine, Nightcrawler, and members of Alpha Flight, but is captured and cured by Shaman, then arrested by Department H.

Fur trapper Francois Lartigue later transforms into the Wendigo, battles the Hulk when Bruce Banner stumbles across a cabin belonging to him, and Sasquatch, and is taken to be cured by Shaman.

In Spider-Man #8–12 (the "Perceptions" story arc), a Wendigo-like creature is blamed for killing several children near Hope, British Columbia. Spider-Man's alter ego, Peter Parker, is sent to take pictures during the media frenzy that follows. Wolverine, having previous experience with Wendigos and having concern for the creature's welfare, comes to the town and contacts Peter Parker directly, seeking Spider-Man's assistance. Together, Spider-Man and Wolverine determine the real cause of death among the children. This version of Wendigo is less aggressive, not cannibalistic, and not as durable as other Wendigos.

A few years later, a new Wendigo emerges, leading to a fight with Wolverine and She-Hulk. A local Canadian super-hero, Talisman, arrives and claims to have a magical cure for the Wendigo's condition. After a long battle, the Wendigo is defeated by a combined attack from his two opponents, and placed into S.H.I.E.L.D. custody.

During the Chaos War storyline, it is revealed that a pack of Wendigos exist in the Bering Strait after Red Hulk is attacked by a Wendigo, attracted by his camp fire while cooking a meal. The Red Hulk kills one Wendigo, while the others come to claim the body and eat it.

As part of Marvel Comics' 2012 initiative, "Marvel NOW!", a Wendigo appears as a member of Omega Flight. Wendigo and the rest of Omega Flight are sent by Department H to investigate one of the Origin Bomb sites left by Ex Nihilo in Regina, Canada, a mission in which Wendigo is killed.

A Wendigo is summoned to Las Vegas through the wishing well of Tyrannus along with Bi-Beast, Fin Fang Foom, Umar, and Arm'Cheddon to fight the Hulk. This Wendigo is capable of minimalistic human speech and teams up with Bi-Beast to use the well's powers to allow them to grow to about 30 feet tall for fighting the Hulk. However, both creatures are easily defeated by the Hulk and are imprisoned along with Arm'Cheddon in the Dark Dimension by Umar until Tyrannus and Fin Fang Foom raid the dimension, allowing them to escape in the chaos.

A later confrontation between two Canadian meat packing plant employees resulted in one accidentally killing the other, and the perpetrator trying to cover it up by running the body through a meat grinder. This resulted in a mass outbreak of the Wendigo curse, which was greatly exacerbated by the curse being transmitted via bite wounds inflicted by the Wendigos, in a process akin to lycanthropy. Tanaraq (the "father" of the Wendigo) intends to spread the curse outside Canada and across Earth. The combined efforts of the X-Men, the other Beasts, and Guardian thwart his plan, eliminating the curse.

Roxxon embarks on an archaeological expedition to find a Wendigo. When a Wendigo attacks a scientist named Ella Sterling, she is saved by Weapon H. It was revealed that Roxxon executive Mr. Banks had a miner named Philips Waggoner eat Wendigo meat at the site where the Avignon Party resided during a blizzard. Waggoner is transformed into an Ur-Wendigo, which is more powerful than any normal Wendigo and can grow larger by eating flesh. Weapon H borrows Doctor Strange's Ax of Angarruumus and allows himself to be eaten by the Ur-Wendigo to kill it from within.

Wolverine later encounters Leonard Two-Bears, a teenager who was inflicted with the Wendigo curse. Leonard explains to Wolverine that he had fled an abusive group home alongside his friend Ryan only for Ryan to die in the wilderness. Leonard cannibalized Ryan's corpse, resulting in him contracting the Wendigo curse. Wolverine stays with Leonard to help him control himself and ultimately reunites him with his mother.

== Powers and abilities ==
The Wendigo possesses a variety of superhuman physical abilities and powerful claws as a result of transformation by an ancient mystical curse. However, Wendigos usually retain little of their former human personas. Sorcerers such as Mauvais and Lorenzo have been able to avoid this aspect of the curse, using magic to gain the power of the Wendigo while maintaining their intelligence.

== Other Wendigos ==
In The Amazing Spider-Man #277, a creature called Wendigo appears. It is a reptilian, ghost-like being who can become invisible and generate intense cold.

== Other versions ==
=== Age of Revelation ===
A possible future version of Leonard / Wendigo appears in "Age of Revelation".

=== Earth X ===
An original incarnation of Wendigo, Jamie Madrox, appears in "Earth X".

=== MC2 ===
In the MC2 imprint, the Hulk, Doctor Strange, Wolverine, and Wolverine's daughter Wild Thing encounter a large number of Wendigos who were transformed from a lost Cub Scout troop. However, Strange ultimately removes the curse and their memory of the events.

=== Secret Warps ===
Greer Baptise / Wentigra, an amalgamation of the Georges Baptiste version of Wendigo and Tigra created by the Infinity Gems, appears in the Infinity Wars storyline.

== In other media ==
=== Television ===
- The Wendigo appears in The Incredible Hulk episode "And the Wind Cries...Wendigo!", voiced by Leeza Miller McGee. This version is the result of a curse placed upon a Native American warrior, who is eventually defeated and restored by the Hulk.
- The Wendigo appears in the Wolverine and the X-Men episode "Wolverine vs. Hulk". Unlike most versions, the Wendigo was not a supernatural creature, but the result of a super soldier experiment conducted by S.H.I.E.L.D. which went out of control, so Nick Fury sent both Bruce Banner and Wolverine to cure it.
- The Wendigo makes a non-speaking cameo appearance in The Avengers: Earth's Mightiest Heroes episode "Breakout".
- The Wendigo appears in the Avengers Assemble episode "Avengers: Impossible".
- The Wendigo appears in the Hulk and the Agents of S.M.A.S.H. episode "Wendigo Apocalypse", voiced by Dee Bradley Baker. This version possesses the ability to convert others into Wendigos.
- A Wendigo King appears in the Ultimate Spider-Man episode "Contest of Champions", voiced again by Dee Bradley Baker.
- A pack of Wendigos appear in Lego Marvel Avengers: Code Red, voiced by Travis Willingham and Fred Tatasciore.

=== Film ===
- A pack of Wendigos appear in Iron Man and Hulk: Heroes United.
- The Paul Cartier incarnation of Wendigo was meant to appear in the unproduced film X-Men: Fear the Beast. This version would have been a fellow scientist and colleague of Hank McCoy with a similar mutation who accidentally transforms himself into the Wendigo.

=== Video games ===
- The Wendigo appears as a boss in X-Men (1992).
- The Wendigo appears as a boss in X2: Wolverine's Revenge.
- Monsters based on the Wendigo called the W.E.N.D.I.G.O. Prototype (Weaponized Experiment Neurodendritic Incident Gamma Zero) appear in X-Men Origins: Wolverine. They are genetically engineered monsters whose transformations are triggered by adrenaline surges and serve as bosses in Weapon X facilities.
- The Wendigo appears in Avengers Initiative.
- The Wendigo appears in Marvel Super Hero Squad Online.
- The Wendigo appears as a playable character in Lego Marvel's Avengers.
- A pack of Wendigos appear in Marvel's Guardians of the Galaxy. This version inhabits in the planet Maklu IV, where Fin Fang Foom also resides.
