= Alpha Flight =

Group of fictional characters

- Alpha Flight promotional art by John Byrne; Top row: Sasquatch; Middle row: Northstar, Snowbird, Shaman, Guardian, Aurora; Bottom row: Puck, Marrina Smallwood

Publication information
- Publisher: Marvel Comics
- First appearance: Cameo: The Uncanny X-Men #120 (April 1979); Full: The Uncanny X-Men #121 (May 1979)
- Created by: John Byrne

In-story information
- Type of organization: Team
- Base(s): Parliament Hill; Tamarind Island; Maison Alpha; Department H
- Agent(s): Current members: Aurora; Guardian; Nemesis; Northstar; Puck; Shaman; Snowbird

Roster

Alpha Flight is a fictional team of Canadian superheroes appearing in American comic books published by Marvel Comics. The characters premiered in The Uncanny X-Men #120 (April 1979), and were created to serve as part of the X-Men member Wolverine's backstory. Marvel published an Alpha Flight comic book series from 1983 to 1994. The team serves as Marvel's premier Canadian superhero team akin to America's Avengers.

== Publication history ==
Created by British-born Canadian-raised writer and artist John Byrne, the team's leader - Weapon Alpha (later renamed to Guardian), first appeared in The Uncanny X-Men #109. The full team, which was also created by Byrne, then first appeared in a two-part story in The Uncanny X-Men #120 and 121. Byrne never intended the team to be an ongoing title. He created them "merely to survive a fight with the X-Men" for the purposes of that story. Marvel convinced Byrne to feature them in their own series as a way to capitalize on Byrne's soaring popularity with comics fans at the time, but he never found them to have compelling stories or backgrounds and left the title after writing and pencilling the first 28 issues.

The 1985 X-Men and Alpha Flight limited series was originally to be pencilled by Byrne, but he was unable to fit it into his heavy schedule, so the assignment was given to former X-Men artist Paul Smith, who had never drawn Alpha Flight before. Smith said his approach was to try "to be faithful to the way John did them without drawing them the way John's drawn them." The series was written by Chris Claremont, who collaborated with Byrne on the story which introduced Alpha Flight, and inked by Bob Wiacek, who was the inker on Alpha Flight for most of Byrne's last year on the series.

Alpha Flight's ongoing series continued until 1994, lasting 130 issues as well as annuals and miniseries. There have been three short-lived revivals since then, including an eight-issue limited series in 2011–12, after the resurrection of the team in the one shot comic Chaos War: Alpha Flight during the Chaos War event.

Most team members have distinctly Canadian attributes, such as having Inuit/First Nations or French heritage. Throughout most of its history, the team has worked for Department H, a fictional branch of Canada's Department of National Defence that deals with super-powered villains.

== Fictional team biography ==
=== The Flight ===
Alpha Flight was preceded by a team called "The Flight". This team first appeared in Alpha Flight Special vol. 2 #1 (1992).

Inspired by the debut of the Fantastic Four, James Hudson refined the purpose of Department H to find and develop Canada's superheroes. New recruit Groundhog joins Snowbird, St. Elmo, Stitch, Wolverine (as Weapon X) and Smart Alec in training. Within a week, the Flight is pressed into their first battle with Egghead's Emissaries of Evil. Egghead threatens the United States from Canadian soil with a nuclear missile. Smart Alec disables the missile's guidance system, but Egghead triggers the detonation sequence. Smart Alec panics, leading to St. Elmo transforming the missile and the bomb into light. St. Elmo succeeds, but loses himself in the process. Groundhog and Michael Twoyoungmen scold Hudson for sending the team into battle while so inexperienced, with a near psychotic leader (Weapon X) and someone who folds under pressure. Hudson makes plans for a tiered team system, leading to the formation of Alpha, Beta and Gamma Flight.

=== Pre-regular series ===
Alpha Flight first appeared in Uncanny X-Men #120 (April 1979), in which they are sent to follow up on Vindicator's first mission to retrieve Wolverine from the X-Men (Uncanny X-Men #109).

The initial makeup of (Alpha Flight) was drawn from all corners of Canada and included:

- Guardian: Originally Weapon Alpha, then Vindicator, James MacDonald Hudson is a scientist from London, Ontario who wears a suit of battle-armor, allowing him to fly and manipulate Earth's magnetic field. Guardian is the team's first leader; he wears a stylized Canadian maple leaf flag on his costume.
- Northstar: Jean-Paul Beaubier from Montreal, Quebec is a mutant with powers of super-speed and light generation.
- Aurora: Jeanne-Marie Beaubier is Northstar's twin sister who has dissociative identity disorder (multiple personalities). Like her brother, she is also a mutant with powers of super-speed, flight, light generation, and molecular acceleration.
- Sasquatch: Walter Langowski is a scientist from Vancouver, British Columbia who can transform into a giant fur-covered beast resembling his namesake. This character originally developed his powers from a Hulk-inspired gamma radiation experiment that was affected by a solar-flare. Eventually, it was explained that Sasquatch's powers are actually derived from the entity Tanaraq.
- Shaman: Michael Twoyoungmen is a First Nations medicine man from Calgary, Alberta. He is both a skilled doctor and sorcerer.
- Snowbird: Also known as Narya, she is an Inuk demi-goddess from Yellowknife, Northwest Territories who can transform into animals of the north.

According to Byrne, Guardian and Snowbird were "fan characters", created before he became professionally involved in comics, and he created all the remaining members while working on X-Men #120, specifically designing them to be balanced with the X-Men in power.

=== Volume 1 ===
The first (Alpha Flight) comic book series started in 1983 which ran until 1994.

Promoted from Beta Flight despite Department H being closed down by the Canadian government were:

- Marrina Smallwood: An amphibious woman from Newfoundland, she was a former member of Beta Flight before joining Alpha Flight. She is actually part of an extraterrestrial invading force known as the Plodex.
- Puck: Eugene Judd is a dwarf bouncer from Saskatoon, Saskatchewan with enhanced strength and extraordinary acrobatic abilities.

Heather MacNeil is married to James Hudson. After Guardian's apparent death in Alpha Flight #12, she becomes the leader of the team. Later, she utilizes a replica of his battle suit and costume and takes the codename of Vindicator, then Guardian.

Alpha Flight continued for 130 issues, and introduced dozens of characters and villains (the most prominent of which were Talisman, Madison Jeffries, Box, Diamond Lil, Wild Child, Persuasion, and Witchfire).

=== Volume 2 ===
In 1997, Marvel relaunched the series with different characters. The new additions to the roster included:

- Flex: Adrian Corbo is a mutant with the ability to transform his limbs into sharp weapons. He is the half-brother of Radius.
- Manbot: Bernie Lechenay is a human/Box robot cyborg.
- Murmur: Arlette Truffaut is a young mutant from Quebec City, Quebec with powers of mind-control and teleportation.
- Radius: Jared Corbo is a mutant with the ability to create a force field.
- General Clarke: The sinister new director of Department H, responsible for many of the dark plots surrounding the team. Gains some measure of redemption with his sacrifice in issue #12.

Returning members were Vindicator (Heather Hudson, with a new costume and new geothermal powers), a de-aged Guardian (who turned out to be a clone of the original James Hudson, set at age 19), and Puck. Sunfire was also briefly a member while looking for a cure to a crippling illness.

The focus of this series was on Department H's consistently hidden agenda and Alpha Flight's reluctance to comply thereto. The conspiracy plotline saw Department H allowing an incarnation of Zodiac to kidnap Madison Jeffries, who was subsequently brainwashed into becoming the group's "Gemini". To keep the group from interfering with their "deal", Department H brainwashed the team into forgetting Jeffries' kidnapping. Also, Department H employed an actual sasquatch as the new team's version of Sasquatch, without telling the team that it was not Walter Langkowski. Department H also arranged the kidnapping of Diamond Lil, another former Alpha Flight member and Jeffries' wife, when she began to inquire about the location of her husband, with the intent of using her as a test subject for illegal medical experiments.

The series ended with issue #20 with most of the major storylines, such as the identity of the younger version of Guardian, unresolved, until Wolverine vol. 2 #142-143, when the plotline was resolved with the return of the real Guardian and the heroic sacrifice of the clone version.

=== Volume 3: "All-New, All-Different" Alpha Flight ===
In 2004, Marvel started a new volume of Alpha Flight, with the "All-New, All-Different" prefix.

The new team recruited by Sasquatch includes:

- Centennial: Rutherford Princeton is a 97-year-old man whose mutant powers of superhuman strength, invulnerability, flight, and heat vision manifested after being awakened from a coma by Sasquatch.
- Major Mapleleaf: Lou Sadler is the son of a World War II super-hero of the same name. He is secretly a normal human who rides a superpowered horse.
- Nemesis: Amelia Weatherly is both an adversary and ally of the old Alpha Flight. She has the power of flight and is skilled with a magical blade.
- Puck: Zuzha Yu is the daughter of the original Puck. She has superhuman strength, speed, and agility.
- Yukon Jack: Also known as Yukotujakzurjimozoata, he is a mysterious man from a primitive tribe, bought from his father by Sasquatch.

"Waxing Poetic", the second six-issue story arc, sees the return of some original team members as both the original versions visited in the past, and temporal copies brought to the present. These members were Guardian, Vindicator, Puck, and Shaman.

=== Omega Flight ===
Sasquatch, Guardian, Vindicator, Shaman, Major Mapleleaf, and Puck are attacked and killed by a new villain, the Collective (inhabiting the body of postal worker Michael Pointer), in New Avengers #16.

The Alpha Flight title was relaunched as Omega Flight in April, 2007 as a five-issue mini-series. The series was written by Michael Avon Oeming and drawn by Scott Kolins. The roster includes Beta Ray Bill, U.S. Agent, Arachne, Talisman, and Michael Pointer. Sasquatch appears as the group's recruiter and leader. Since the mini-series, the team disbanded. Beta Ray Bill exited; U.S. Agent joined Hank Pym's new Avengers team; Pointer, now calling himself Omega, joined the Dark X-Men; and Julia Carpenter became the new Madame Web.

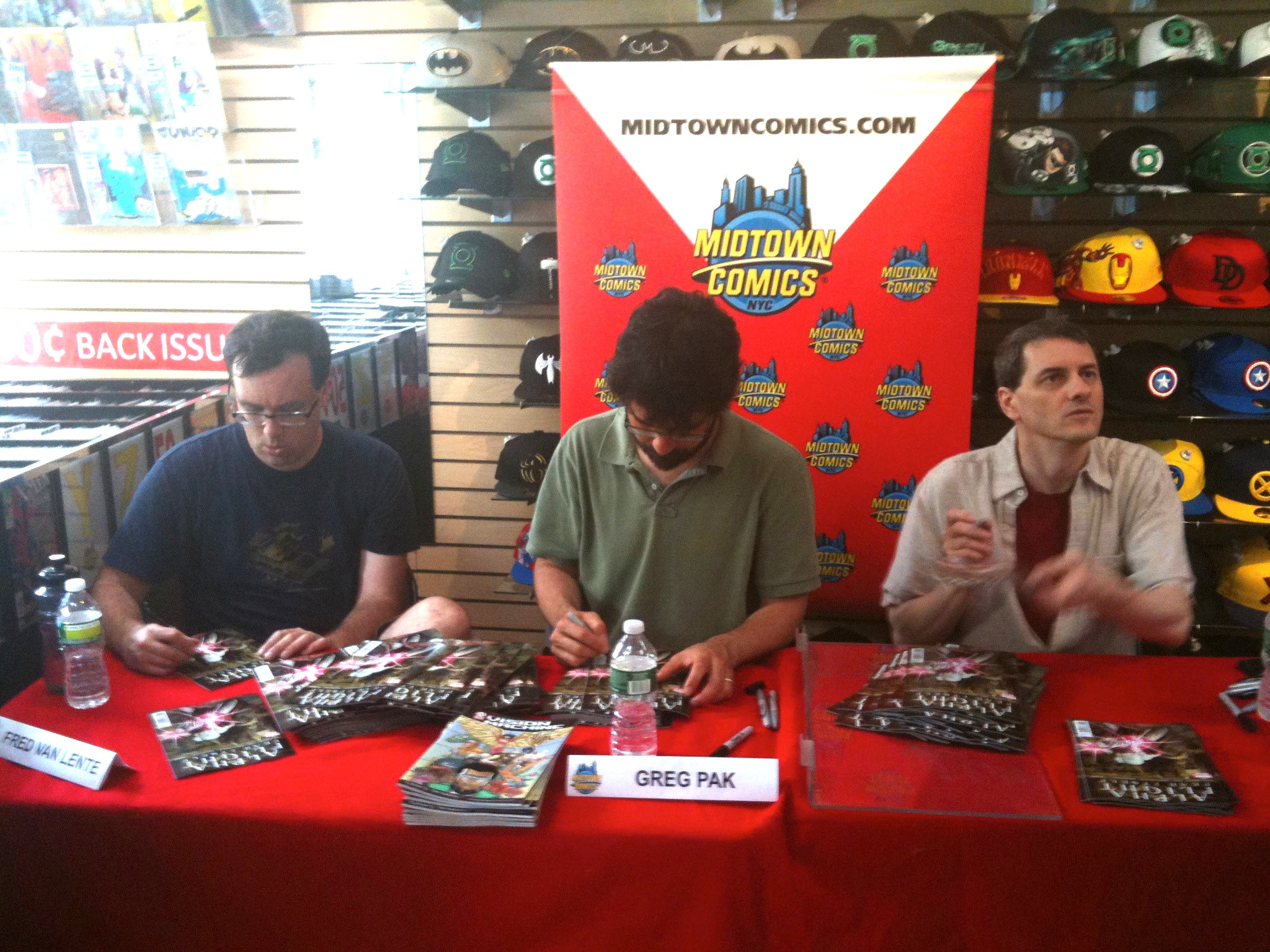
Fred Van Lente, Greg Pak and Mark Paniccia at a signing for Alpha Flight, vol. 4 #1 at Midtown Comics Downtown in Manhattan, June 18, 2011.

=== Volume 4 ===
In the 2010 storyline Chaos War, Guardian, Vindicator, Shaman and Marrina Smallwood return from the dead after escaping from the underworld. Subsequently, the team appeared in a series tied to the crossover storyline Fear Itself, with the resurrected team being joined by Puck. Alpha Flight provides rescue efforts for the victims of a tsunami unleashed by Nerkodd.

After providing rescue efforts for victims of the disaster, Guardian ejects Nerkodd from the country by dumping him off the coast of Cape Race. Once Nerkodd is defeated and repelled, Alpha Flight returns to their headquarters and are betrayed by Gary Cody and his newly elected Unity Party. To make things worse, Vindicator has sided with him.

At Parliament Hill, Walter is informed by Agent Jeff Brown that the concussions he sustained as a football player will cause him to act less human when he changes back into Sasquatch. Jeff also tells Walter that he will soon achieve Unity. Marrina pretends to give in to the Unity treatment so that she can break free. Shaman manages to knock out Jeff and frees Walter, while Guardian frees Snowbird. Northstar and Puck manage to find Marrina, who has knocked out the guards and scientists present. After Alpha Flight escaped, they learn that Gary Cody and his Unity Party are fascists. It is soon discovered that Master of the World is behind the Unity Party.

Vindicator (still under the Master of the World's mental control) helps Alpha Flight against Master of the World when he attempts to kill Claire. Alpha Flight successfully creates the machine to free the people that Master of the World had under his mental control. They kill Master of the World, but Vindicator flies away with Claire. Afterward, Alpha Flight celebrates after the Unity Party is abolished.

=== Space program version ===
A different version of Alpha Flight debuted as part of the All-New, All-Different Marvel event. This version is a space program that becomes Earth's line of defense from extraterrestrial threats and resides in the Alpha Flight Low-Orbit Space Station. Its members include Captain Marvel, Abigail Brand, Aurora, Puck, and Sasquatch.

=== Return of the original team ===
The original lineup of Alpha Flight would be revived as Canada's top superhero team once more in their post-space program years consisting of Guardian, Aurora, Northstar, Snowbird, Sasquatch, Puck and Marrina.

=== Volume 5 ===
During the "Fall of X" relaunch, Guardian, Snowbird, Shaman, and Puck are ordered by Department H to hunt down mutants after the anti-mutant organization Orchis manipulates the Canadian government into declaring Canadian mutants threats to the country. The team's actions puts them at odds with their former mutant members Northstar and Aurora, who are joined by Aurora's lover and Wolverine's son Fang and the new Nemesis, later revealed to be Heather Hudson. Unbeknownst to Department H and the public, the two Alpha Flight factions are secretly working with each other to help smuggle Canadian mutants off-world to Shi'ar space. However, Alpha Flight becomes compromised when Department H deploys Box Sentinels to apprehend Canadian mutants. Its remaining members are arrested by Department H for treason.

== Notable villains ==
Alpha Flight has fought many criminals and malevolent entities. Many were unique to them as they were based in Canada. Notable examples include:

- Bedlam - A prisoner gifted powers and leader of the Derangers.
- Citadel - An injured soldier who had adamantium grafted to his skin.
- Deadly Ernest (Ernest St. Ives) - An immortal soldier with a death touch. He was killed by his daughter Isabel.
- Dreamqueen
- Gilded Lily - A long-lived alchemist.
- Great Beasts – The Great Beasts are supernatural creatures.
- Jerry Jaxon and his Omega Flight
- Master of the World - An immortal caveman who gained superhuman physical abilities and intelligence from Plodex experimentation.
- Pestilence (J.R. Crozier) - A centuries-old ship doctor placed in suspended animation in permafrost.
- Pink Pearl
- The Plodex - A brutal conquering alien race, of which Marrina Smallwood is a member.
- Ranark - A centuries-old shaman.
- Wendigo - A race of creatures that fought Alpha Flight on occasion.

== Other versions ==
=== Marvel Adventures ===
An alternate universe iteration of Alpha Flight appears in Marvel Adventures: Iron Man #11, consisting of Northstar, Aurora, Guardian, Sasquatch, Shaman, and Snowbird.

=== Marvel Zombies ===
An alternate universe iteration of Alpha Flight appears in Marvel Zombies: Dead Days, consisting of Guardian, Northstar, Aurora, Sasquatch, Puck, and Snowbird. After being converted into zombies, the group is killed by Magneto, who uses his powers to make various metallic objects pierce their brains.

=== Old Man Logan ===
An alternate universe iteration of Alpha Flight appears in Old Man Logan #17, consisting of Guardian, Northstar, Aurora, Sasquatch, Puck and Snowbird.

=== Ultimate Marvel ===
An alternate universe iteration of Alpha Flight appears in Ultimate X-Men #94, consisting of Vindicator (John Wraith), Shaman (John Proudstar), Jubilee, Sunfire, Sasquatch (Rahne Sinclair), Snowbird (Danielle Moonstar), and Aurora. The group's members use a drug called "Banshee" to enhance their abilities, making them more powerful than normal mutants.

=== What If? ===
Alpha Flight was featured in the different "What If?" stories:

- In "What If The All-New All-Different X-Men Had Never Existed," Wolverine is the leader of Alpha Flight.
- In "What If Wolverine Was Leader Of Alpha Flight?", Alpha Flight succeeds in capturing Logan. After Logan escapes and boards the X-Men's plane, the X-Men are attacked by military forces, who kill most of the group's members. Following the death of the X-Men, Wolverine is forced to return to Alpha Flight, becoming the group's leader. Wolverine and Alpha Flight rescue Professor X and the surviving X-Men (Iceman, Havok, Beast, and Angel) from the Hellfire Club. Jean Grey, now the Dark Phoenix, tries to get Wolverine to kill Northstar, but he kills her instead to free her from the Phoenix persona.
- In "What if... Wolverine had battled Weapon X?", the Flight members were in the middle of their training when Guy Desjardins (Weapon X) breaks free after the eponymous program left Desjardins in the hands of Department H.

== Collected editions ==
Title	Material collected	Published date	ISBN
Alpha Flight Classic Vol. 1	Alpha Flight (vol. 1) #1-8	April 2007	978-0785127468
Alpha Flight Classic Vol. 2	Alpha Flight (vol. 1) #9-19, X-Men (vol. 1) #106	October 2011	978-0785131250
Alpha Flight Classic Vol. 3	Alpha Flight (vol. 1) #20-29, Incredible Hulk #313 and material from Secret Wars II #4	November 2012	978-0785162926
X-Men/Alpha Flight	X-Men and Alpha Flight #1-2, X-Men/Alpha Flight #1-2, X-Men (vol. 1) #109, 120–121, 139–140	June 2011	978-0785155133
Alpha Flight by John Byrne Omnibus	X-Men (vol. 1) #109, 120–121, 139–140, Incredible Hulk Annual #8, Machine Man #18, Marvel Two-In-One #83-84, Incredible Hulk #272, 313, Alpha Flight (vol. 1) #1-29, X-Men and Alpha Flight #1-2, X-Men/Alpha Flight #1-2, and material from Marvel Team-Up Annual #7	February 2017	978-1302904050
Alpha Flight by Mantlo & Lee	Alpha Flight (1983) #30-70, Annual #1-2; Avengers #272; Marvel Fanfare (1982) #28	January 2026	
Alpha Flight Vol. 1: You Gotta Be Kiddin' Me	Alpha Flight (vol. 3) #1-6	December 2004	978-0785114307
Alpha Flight Vol. 2: Waxing Poetic	Alpha Flight (vol. 3) #7-12	April 2005	978-0785115694
Chaos War: X-Men	Chaos War: Alpha Flight #1 and Chaos War: X-Men #1-2, Chaos War: Godsquad #1, Chaos War: Chaos King #1 and material from X-Men: Curse Of The Mutants Spotlight	June 2011	978-0785153153
Alpha Flight by Greg Pak and Fred Van Lente	Alpha Flight (vol. 4) #0.1, 1–8	May 2012	978-0785162834

== In other media ==
=== Television ===
- Alpha Flight appears in the X-Men: The Animated Series episode "Repo Man", consisting of Vindicator, Puck, Snowbird, Shaman, Northstar, Aurora, Sasquatch, and Heather Hudson.
- Puck, Northstar, and Aurora make non-speaking appearances in the X-Men '97 episode "Tolerance Is Extinction".

=== Video games ===
Alpha Flight appears in Marvel Strike Force, consisting of Sunfire, Wolverine, Guardian, Northstar, and Sasquatch.

=== Music ===
- The band Courage My Love featured various issues of Alpha Flight in their YouTube video of their song "I Sell Comics".
- San Diego–based band Manual Scan's 1997 album, "Plan of Action" includes a full page 1984 vintage photo of frontman Bart Mendoza reading Alpha Flight #6
- Chicago-based band The Kickback released a song called "Alpha Flight" on their Mea Culpa Mea Culpa EP
- Brampton-based Canadian band The Vulcan Dub Squad released a song called "Alpha Flight #12" on their 2005 album Just Watch Us.

== See also ==
- List of Flight members
- Beta Flight
- Gamma Flight
- Omega Flight
