= Alpha Flight (comic book) =

Marvel Comics titles

- Cover to Alpha Flight (vol. 1) #1 by John Byrne

Publication information
- Publisher: Marvel Comics
- Schedule: Ongoing (vol. 1–3); Limited (vol. 4–5)
- Format: Ongoing series
- Genre: Superhero
- Publication date: (Vol. 1) August 1983 – March 1994 (Vol. 2); August 1997 – March 1999 (Vol. 3) May 2004 – April 2005 (Vol. 4) July 2011 – January 2012 (Vol. 5) August 2023 – present
- No. of issues: (vol. 1); 130, 2 annuals (vol. 2); 20, 1 annual (vol. 3); 12 (vol. 4); 8 (vol. 5); 5
- Main character: Alpha Flight

Creative team
- Written by: (vol. 1): John Byrne (1–28); Bill Mantlo (29–66, Annual #1-2); James Hudnall (67–86); Fabian Nicieza (87–101); Scott Lobdell (102–108); Simon Furman (110–112, 114–130); Sven Larsen (113); (vol. 2): Steven T. Seagle; (vol. 3): Scott Lobdell; (vol. 4): Greg Pak; Fred Van Lente; (vol. 5):Ed Brisson
- Penciller(s): (vol. 1); John Byrne (1–28); Michael Mignola (29–31); Jon Bogdanove (32); Sal Buscema (33–34); Dave Ross (35–44); June Brigman (45–50); Jim Lee (51–62); Hugh Haynes (65–68); John Calimee (69–71, 73-76, 78-82, 84-85); Gerry Talaoc (72); Huw Thomas (77); Jim Sherman (83); Mark Bagley (86); Michael Bair (87-91, 93-95, 97-100); Dan Reed (92); Michael Adams (96); Tom Morgan (101-105, 107-109); Mark Pacella (106); Craig Brasfield (113, 121); Pat Broderick (110-112, 114-120, 122-124); Jim Reddington (125); Dario Carrasco Jr (126-130) (vol. 2); Scott Clark (vol. 3); Clayton Henry (vol. 4); Dale Eaglesham (vol. 5); Scott Godlewski
- Inker(s): (vol. 1); John Byrne (1–14); Bob Wiacek (15–28); Gerry Talaoc (29–38); Whilce Portacio (39–54); Al Milgrom (58–65) (vol. 2); Chris Carlson (vol. 3); Mark Morales (vol. 4); Andrew Hennessy
- Letterer(s): (vol. 1); Joe Rosen; Jim Novak; Ken Bruzenak (vol. 2); Albert Deschesne; Richard Starkings (vol. 3); Richard Starkings
- Colorist(s): (vol. 1); Andy Yanchus; Bob Sharen; Glynis Oliver (vol. 2); Lee Ann Garner (vol. 3); Avalon Studios (vol. 5); Matt Milla
- Editor(s): (vol. 1); Denny O'Neil; Carl Potts (vol. 2); Jaye Gardner (vol. 3); Mike Marts; Stephanie Moore; Cory Sedlmeier

Collected editions
- Alpha Flight Classic Volume 1 (vol. 1 #1–8): ISBN 0-7851-2746-1
- Alpha Flight Classic Volume 2 (vol. 1 #9–16): ISBN 0-7851-3125-6
- Alpha Flight Volume 1 (vol. 3 #1–6): ISBN 0-7851-1430-0
- Alpha Flight Volume 2 (vol. 3 #7–12): ISBN 0-7851-1569-2
- Omega Flight: Alpha to Omega (Omega Flight #1–5): ISBN 0-7851-2441-1
- Alpha Flight by Greg Pak and Fred Van Lente Volume 1 (vol. 4 #0.1, 1–4): ISBN 0-7851-6282-8

Alpha Flight is the name of several comic book titles featuring the team Alpha Flight and published by Marvel Comics, beginning with the original Alpha Flight comic book series from 1983 to 1994.

== Publication history ==
Created by John Byrne, the team first appeared in X-Men #120 (April 1979). The team was originally merely a part of the backstory of the X-Men's Wolverine but, in 1983, Marvel launched an eponymous series featuring the group, which continued until 1994, lasting 130 issues as well as annuals and miniseries. Three short-lived revivals have been attempted since, including an eight-issue limited series in 2011–12, after the resurrection of the team during the Chaos War event.

=== Volume 1 ===
Though reluctant to take the job, John Byrne wrote and drew the series for 28 issues before handing it off to another creative team. During that time, the series' storylines generally dealt with the personal problems of one or two characters at a time, seldom bringing all the members together or confronting problems outside the team itself. This approach drew some criticism.

Byrne left, trading titles with then-Incredible Hulk scribe Bill Mantlo, who stepped in to become the series's longest-running writer. Later writers on Alpha Flight include James Hudnall, Fabian Nicieza, Scott Lobdell, and Simon Furman. Byrne's successor as penciler was Mike Mignola, and subsequently Dave Ross, another Canadian, though he claims that his nationality was not a factor in his being chosen for the series, and that Marvel even sent him a box full of Canadian reference material after he was given the assignment.

In Alpha Flight #106 (1992), writer Scott Lobdell was given permission to have the character Northstar state, "I am gay." As the first major, openly gay character published by Marvel Comics, Northstar generated significant publicity in the mainstream press and Alpha Flight #106 sold out in a week, despite the fact that the series was not a very popular title. It is the only comic book issue to have been inducted into the Gaylactic Hall of Fame. The event was also controversial, and almost no mention was made of his sexual orientation for the remainder of the first Alpha Flight series.

The issue of Alpha Flight in which Northstar came out was hugely popular and the New York Magazine reported that a store in Bleecker Street in New York City resorted to making customers who wanted to buy a copy of it to buy a second comic. This was criticized but outside the law. Later they made a policy that everyone who bought a copy had to buy an issue of the series The Punisher War Zone as well. The store claimed they did this to prevent hoarding of the comic. The policy was in effect for thirty minutes till the store was all sold out. In the end they received only one complaint.

Alpha Flight continued for 130 issues, and introduced dozens of characters and villains. The series ended in 1994.

=== Volume 2 ===
In 1997, Marvel relaunched the series with different characters. The series was written by Steven Seagle, then known mainly for his work for DC Comics' Vertigo line, with art mostly by Scott Clark and Duncan Rouleau. One issue, #13, featured guest art by Ashley Wood in an unusually conventional style for him, but still very distinctive for a Marvel superhero comic. This series ended in 1999 after only twenty issues and an annual.

The focus of this series was on Department H's consistently hidden agenda and Alpha Flight's reluctance to comply thereto.

Despite initial positive buzz, the series never took off and the conspiracy plotlines were downplayed for the remaining six issues of the series. The series ended with issue #20 with most of the major storylines unresolved.

=== Volume 3: "All-New, All-Different" Alpha Flight ===
In 2004, Marvel started a new volume of Alpha Flight, with the "All-New, All-Different" prefix.

The first six-issue story arc, which shows Sasquatch attempting to construct the new team, is called "You Gotta Be Kiddin' Me".

The second six-issue story arc, entitled "Waxing Poetic", saw the return of some original team members as both the original versions visited in the past, and temporal copies brought to the present.

The series was canceled with issue #12.

=== Volume 4 ===
In 2011, the team appeared in a series tied to the crossover storyline Fear Itself, with the newly alive team to be joined by Puck.

=== Alpha Flight: True North ===
In June 2019, Marvel Comics announced that Alpha Flight would return in a one-shot titled Alpha Flight: True North featuring the original lineup (with the exception of Aurora) and written by Canadian writers Jim Zub, Jed MacKay and Ed Brisson to commemorate the 80th anniversary of the company.

=== Volume 5 ===
In August 2023, the team returned in a five-issue limited series written by Ed Brisson and drawn by Scott Godlewski, as part of the "Fall of X" relaunch. The lineup includes most of the original team, as well as new addition Fang and Heather Hudson inheriting the Nemesis mantle.

== Collected editions ==
Their appearances have been collected into a number of trade paperbacks:

=== Alpha Flight Volume 1 ===
- Byrne, John (2007). Alpha Flight Classic – Volume 1. New York: Marvel Diamond distributor. 224 pages. ISBN 978-0-7851-2746-8. (Collects Alpha Flight #1-8)
- Byrne, John (2011). Alpha Flight Classic – Volume 2. New York: Marvel Worldwide, Inc. 296 pages. ISBN 978-0-7851-3125-0. (Collects Alpha Flight #9-19 and X-Men #109)
- Byrne, John (2011). Alpha Flight Classic – Volume 3. New York: Marvel Worldwide, Inc. 280 pages. ISBN 978-0-7851-6292-6. (Collects Alpha Flight #20-29 and Incredible Hulk (vol. 2) #313.

=== X-Men crossovers ===
- Claremont, Chris; Raab, Ben; Cassaday, John; Smith, Paul (2011). X-Men: Alpha Flight. New York: Marvel Worldwide. 280 pages. ISBN 978-0-7851-5513-3. (Collects X-Men & Alpha Flight #1-2, X-Men/Alpha Flight (vol. 2) #1-2, X-Men #109, 120–121, 139–140)
- Claremont, Chris; Smith, Paul; Adams, Arthur (2010). X-Men: Asgardian Wars. New York: Marvel Diamond distributor. 248 pages. ISBN 978-0-7851-4148-8. (Collects X-Men & Alpha Flight #1-2, New Mutants Special Edition #1, X-Men Annual #9)

=== Alpha Flight Volume 3 ===
- Scott, Lobdell (2004). Alpha Flight – Volume 1: You Gotta Be Kiddin' Me. New York: Marvel Comics. 136 pages. ISBN 0-7851-1430-0. (Collects Alpha Flight (vol. 3) #1-6)
- Scott, Lobdell (2005). Alpha Flight – Volume 2: Waxing Poetic. New York: Marvel Comics. 144 pages. ISBN 0-7851-1569-2. (Collects Alpha Flight (vol. 3) #7-12)

=== Omega Flight ===
- Oeming, Michael Avon; Kolins, Scott (2007). Omega Flight: Alpha to Omega. New York: Marvel Publishing. 128 pages. ISBN 978-0-7851-2441-2. (Collects Omega Flight #1-5)
- Koslowski, Rich; Di Vito, Andrea (2008). Weapon Omega. New York: Marvel Diamond distributor. 128 pages. ISBN 978-0-7851-3415-2. (Collects material from Marvel Comics Presents (vol. 2) #1-12)

=== Alpha Flight Volume 4 ===
- Pak, Greg; Van Lente, Fred (2012). Alpha Flight by Greg Pak and Fred Van Lente Volume 1. New York: Marvel Turnaround distributor. 120 pages. ISBN 978-0-7851-6282-7. (Collects Alpha Flight (vol. 4) #0.1, 1–4)

== In other media ==
- On February 23, 2022, Luke Cage showrunner Cheo Hodari Coker confirmed that the sudden "rugpull" death of initial series' antagonist Cornell "Cottonmouth" Stokes (primarily portrayed by Mahershala Ali) in the seventh episode of the series' first season was from the series' pitch based on the death of Guardian in Alpha Flight #12.
