= Gambit (comic book) =

Marvel comic book series

- Cover of Gambit (vol .1) #1 (December 1993), art by Lee Weeks.

Publication information
- Schedule: Monthly
- Format: List: Vol. 1-2; 6; Limited series; Vol. 3-5; Ongoing series
- Genre: Superhero
- Publication date: December 1993 – January 2023
- No. of issues: List: Vol. 1 & 2: 4; Vol. 3: 26 (two Annuals); Vol. 4: 12; Vol. 5: 17; Vol. 6: 5

Creative team
- Written by: List: Vol. 1; Howard Mackie; Vol. 2; Howard Mackie; Terry Kavanagh; Vol. 3; Fabian Nicieza; Vol. 4; John Layman; Vol. 5; James Asmus; Vol. 6; Chris Claremont
- Penciller: List: Vol. 1; Lee Weeks; Vol. 2; Klaus Janson; Vol. 3; Pasqual Ferry; Steve Skroce; Yanick Paquette; Jim Calafiore; Anthony Williams; Carlos Pacheco; George Jeanty; Vol. 4; Clay Mann; Vol. 5; Clay Mann; Leonard Kirk; Diogenes Neves; Amilcar Pinna; Khoi Pham; Vol. 6; Wilton Santos
- Inker: List: Vol. 1; Klaus Janson; Jason Gorder; Vol. 2; Klaus Janson; Bill Sienkiewicz; Vol. 3; Bob Wiacek; Scott Hanna; Vol. 4; Clayton Crain; Vol. 5; Clay Mann; Jay Leisten; Cam Smith; Roberto Poggi; David Baldeón; Amilcar Pinna; Vol. 6; Roberto Poggi

Gambit is a series of several comic books published by Marvel Comics from 1993 to 2023, and starring the X-Men character Remy LeBeau / Gambit in both solo and duo titles.

== Publication history ==
=== 1993 series ===
Gambit Volume One (1993) is a four-issue limited series exploring the character's mysterious past.

=== Gambit & The X-Ternals ===
Gambit & The X-Ternals, is a four-issue limited series published in 1995, featured a group of renegade mutants led by Gambit who has been living on the edge of law during the "Age of Apocalypse" storyline.

=== 1997 series ===
Gambit Volume Two (1997) is a four-issue limited series exploring the character's ties to the New Orleans Thieves' Guild.

=== 1998 series ===
From December 1998 to February 2001, an ongoing Gambit series was published for 25 issues, one special, and two annuals (for a total of 28), from writer Fabian Nicieza and artist Steve Skroce.

=== Gambit & Bishop: Sons of the Atom ===
In 2001, the six-issue miniseries Gambit & Bishop: Sons of the Atom was published, advertised as a direct continuation of the 1998–2001 series at the conclusion of its final issue, following Gambit and Bishop.

=== 2004 series ===
From September 2004 to June 2005, an ongoing Gambit series was published for 12 issues, from writer John Layman and artist Georges Jeanty.

=== X-Men Origins: Gambit ===
In 2009, Gambit's past was explored in the one-shot X-Men Origins: Gambit.

=== Curse of the Mutants: Storm & Gambit ===
In 2010, the one-shot Curse of the Mutants: Storm & Gambit was released.

=== 2012 series ===
From August 2012 to November 2013, an ongoing Gambit series was published for 17 issues, from writer James Asmus and artist Clay Mann.

=== Deadpool V Gambit ===
From August to November 2016, an ongoing Gambit and Deadpool team-up series was published and cancelled after 5 issues, from writer Ben Acker and artist Danilo Beyruth.

=== Rogue & Gambit (vol. 1) ===
From January to May 2018, an ongoing Gambit and Rogue team-up series was published for 5 issues, from writer Kelly Thompson and artist Pere Perez.

=== Mr. & Mrs. X ===
From September 2018 and June 2019, a second ongoing Gambit and Rogue team-up series, entitled Mr. & Mrs. X, was published for 12 issues, from writer Kelly Thompson and artists Oscar Bazaldua and Javier Pina, informally known as the second and third volumes of Rogue & Gambit.

=== 2022 series ===
From July to November 2022, a limited-run Gambit series was published for five issues, from writer Chris Claremont and artist Sid Kotian.

=== Rogue & Gambit (vol. 2) ===
From March to July 2023, a third ongoing Gambit and Rogue team-up series was published for five issues, from writer Stephanie Phillips and artist Carlos Gomez, marketed as Rogue & Gambit vol. 2 but informally in-fact being Rogue & Gambit vol. 4 (following both volumes of Mr. & Mrs. X).

== Characters ==
- Remy LeBeau / Gambit – a card-wielding mutant who was adopted by the Thieves' Guild, able to create, control, and manipulate kinetic energy.
- Jacob "Jake" Gavin Jr. / Courier – a shapeshifter able to detach and remotely move his own body parts, who is trapped in the body of a woman by Mister Sinister after he steals his powers, going by the alias Jacqueline ("Jackie").
- Sun / The New Son – an evil version of Gambit from an alternate reality where he never joined the Thieves' Guild.
- Anna-Marie / Rogue – the power-and-lifeforce-absorbing adoptive daughter of Mystique and Gambit's love interest.
- Ororo "‘Ro" Monroe / Storm – a thunder and lightning-controlling mutant goddess and Gambit's former friend.
- Bella Donna Boudreaux – the head of the Thieves' and Assassins' Guilds and Remy's ex-wife.

== Critical reception ==
The series received generally positive reviews from comic critics. AIPT Comics rated the series 7.0/10, calling it "a slow read to be sure [but the] verbose writing style aside, there are some fascinating tidbits about Gambit". Slings & Arrows lauded Nicieza's "verbose form of writing" and Skroce's art as "better than what's perceived as Marvel's 1990s look", complimenting Georges Jeanty for "pull[ing] out all the stops for the art" following Stroke's departure, concluding to call the plot "over-extended, but tie[d] together well".

=== Gambit Vol. 4 – 2004 ===
The series received generally positive reviews from comic critics. AIPT Comics praised the series for having "a good mix of adventures with the predominant story" along with "clean art keep[ing] things looking fresh", concluding to call it "a good [series] with plenty of fun moments Gambit fans should not miss [with] a lot of clever ideas [which is] proof enough a Gambit movie wouldn't be hard to pull off. ComicVine likewise praised the series for bringing Gambit "back to his roots", calling it "exactly what is needed in order to give him a successful series".

=== Gambit Vol. 5 – 2012 ===
Gambit Vol. 5 received largely critical reviews, with some commendation for specific aspects. In the first issue, Joey Esposito from IGN rated it 5.5, criticizing its fundamental flaws and lack of cohesive art and characterization, while expressing hope for improvement in future issues. Kelly Thompson at Comic Book Resources gave the debut a 5.0, noting some potential but ultimately recommending readers skip it until the creative team could deliver better work.

By Gambit #2, Jesse Schedeen of IGN rated it 6.0, appreciating Clay Mann's art during heist scenes but criticizing the coloring choices. However, his score dropped to 6.2 for Gambit #4, where he expressed disappointment over the story's lack of direction and the underdevelopment of Gambit's partner, Joelle. Thompson scored it 4.0, pointing out technical art issues and the challenges posed by a large, inconsistent artistic team.

In Gambit #11, Ryan K. Lindsay of Comic Book Resources rated the issue 6.0, praising the quality of dialogue and action but noting that the narrative suffered from excessive dialogue and pacing issues. Thompson returned for Gambit #12, again scoring it low at 4.0 due to inconsistent artwork and difficulty connecting with Joelle's character.

Finally, in Gambit #17, Thompson expressed her overall disappointment, rating it 4.0 and lamenting the creative team’s failure to provide a clear direction for Gambit’s character, leaving readers questioning his heroism . Overall, while some issues received praise for particular elements, the series was marred by significant criticisms, leading to a predominantly negative reception.

=== Gambit Vol. 6 – 2022 ===
Gambit Vol. 6 received a mixed reception from critics. The series began with a lukewarm start, with Logan Moore from ComicBook.com giving the first two issues a 6.0 rating, criticizing the lack of direction and the awkward dynamic between Gambit and a young Storm, though praising the artwork by Sid Kotian. By issue #3, the series showed improvement, with Moore noting it as the best installment so far. Issue #4 earned the highest score of 9.0, as the story began to hit its stride and deliver more engaging content. However, the final issue, Gambit #5, dropped back to a 6.0, as the conclusion felt underwhelming despite the series' earlier progress.

== Collected editions ==
Title	Material collected	Publication date	ISBN
Stand-alone series
X-Men: The Trial of Gambit	Uncanny X-Men (vol. 1) #341–350, #−1; X-Men (1991) #62–64, #−1, Imperial Guard (1997) #1-3, Psylocke & Archangel: Crimson Dawn (1997) #1-4, Gambit (1997) #1-4, Bishop: Xavier Security Enforcer (1998) #1-3, Marvel Fanfare (1996) #4-5, Longshot (1998) #1 and material from Marvel Valentine Special (1997) #1.	July 20, 2016	978-1-3029-0070-0
Team-up series
X-Men: Gambit & Bishop	Gambit & Bishop: Sons of the Atom #1–6	circa. 2001	—N/a
X-Men: Wolverine/Gambit – Victims	Wolverine/Gambit: Victims #1–4	March 19, 2013	978-0-7851-6717-4
Deadpool V Gambit: The "V" is for "Vs."	Deadpool V Gambit #1–5	November 23, 2016	978-1-3029-0179-0
Rogue & Gambit: Rings of Fire	Rogue & Gambit (vol. 1) #1–5	July 17, 2018	978-1-3029-1160-7
Mr. & Mrs. X: Love & Marriage	Mr. & Mrs. X #1–6	March 12, 2019	978-1-3029-1351-9
Mr. & Mrs. X: Gambit & Rogue Forever	Mr. & Mrs. X #7–12	August 27, 2019	978-1-3029-1352-6
Rogue & Gambit: Power Play	Rogue & Gambit (vol. 2) #1–5	January 9, 2024	978-1-3029-4806-1
Volume One
X-Men: Gambit Classic, Vol. 1	Uncanny X-Men #265–267 and Gambit (1993) #1–4	May 6, 2009	978-0-7851-3729-0
X-Men: Gambit Classic, Vol. 2	Gambit (1993) #1–4 and Rogue #1–4	February 5, 2013	978-0-7851-6790-7
Volume Two
X-Men: Gambit & Rogue	Gambit (1997) #1–4 and Rogue #1–4	October 25, 2016	978-1-3029-0248-3
Volume Three
X-Men: Gambit – The Complete Collection, Vol. 1	Gambit (vol. 3) #1–11, #1/2, Annual '99, Marvel Authentix: Gambit #1, material from X-Men Unlimited #18	March 8, 2016	978-0-7851-9685-3
X-Men Origins: Gambit	X-Men Origins: Gambit #1, Uncanny X-Men #266–267, X-Men (vol. 2) #33, Gambit (vol. 3) #25, Nation X #2	September 27, 2016	978-1-3029-0247-6
X-Men: Gambit – The Complete Collection, Vol. 2	Gambit (vol. 3) #12–25, Annual 2000	December 24, 2018	978-1-3029-1375-5
Volume Four
Astonishing X-Men: Gambit Vol. 1 – House of Cards	Gambit (vol. 4) #1–6	March 23, 2005	978-0-7851-1522-9
Astonishing X-Men: Gambit Vol. 2 – Hath No Fury	Gambit (vol. 4) #7–12	September 28, 2005	978-0-7851-1747-6
Gambit: Thieves' World – Complete Collection	Gambit (vol. 4) #1–12, X-Men Unlimited vol. 2 #3	March 26, 2019	978-1-3029-1605-3
Volume Five
Gambit: King of Thieves – Complete Collection	Gambit (vol. 5) #1–17, material from A+X #3	May 14, 2019	978-1-3029-1778-4
Gambit: Once a Thief	Gambit (vol. 5) #1–7	April 2, 2013	978-0-7851-6547-7
Gambit: Tombstone Blues	Gambit (vol. 5) #8–12	July 30, 2013	978-0-7851-6548-4
Gambit: King of Thieves	Gambit (vol. 5) #13–17	December 17, 2013	978-0-7851-8413-3
Volume Six
Gambit: Thick as Thieves	Gambit (vol. 6) #1–5	March 3, 2023	978-1-3029-3219-0

== See also ==
- List of X-Men comics
