= Georges Jeanty =

American comic book penciler illustrator

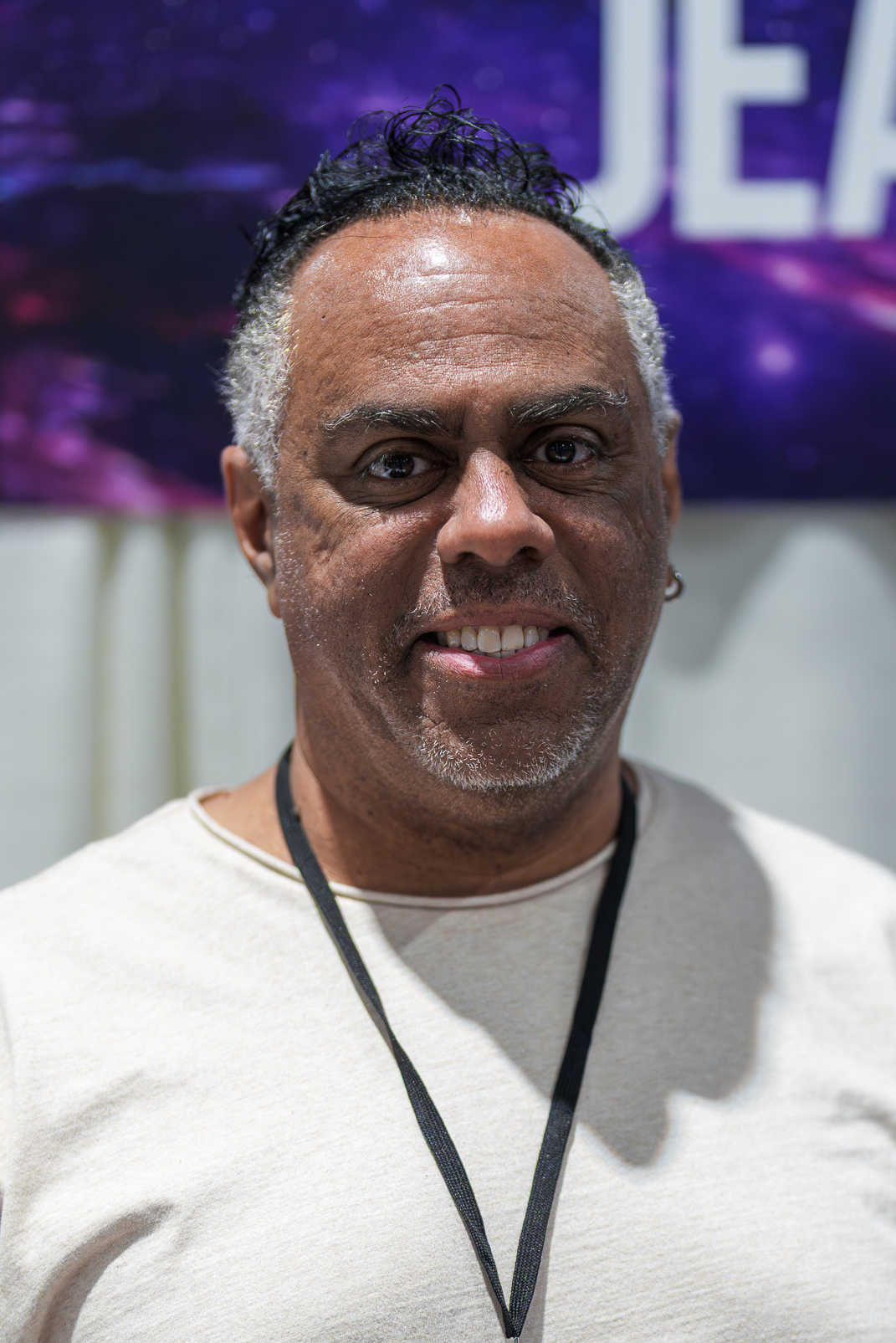
- Jeanty at GalaxyCon Richmond in 2026
- Born: Georges Michael Jeanty Brooklyn, New York, U.S.
- Area: Penciller
- Notable works: Buffy the Vampire Slayer; The American Way; Serenity; X-Men: Gambit; Astonishing X-Men: Gambit; John Walker: U.S. Agent; The Mandalorian
- Awards: Eisner Award

Georges Jeanty is an American comic book penciler illustrator best known for his work on The American Way, an eight-issue American comic book limited series produced under DC Comics' Wildstorm imprint, and the Buffy the Vampire Slayer: Season Eight comic book series published by Dark Horse Comics, various issues of Serenity, X-Men: Gambit, Astonishing X-Men: Gambit, John Walker: U.S. Agent, and The Mandalorian.

== Early life ==
Georges Michael Jeanty was born in Brooklyn, New York, and raised in Miami Beach, Florida. After attending courses in the fine arts at Miami-Dade College, he considered a career in acting, but decided to use his artistic talent to pursue a career as a commercial artist. Inspired by the comic books he read while growing up – featuring 1970s comic book superhero icons like Luke Cage, and classic superhero comics like Fantastic Four and Saga of the Swamp Thing – Jeanty made comic books his focus.

Jeanty specifically credits Frank Miller's Daredevil #183, as pivotal in his decision to pursue a career in comics.

His artist influences include American comic book artists John Byrne, Michael Golden, and Alan Davis, as well as European comic book artist legends Milo Manara and Jean Giraud (Moebius).

== Career ==
=== Early career ===
Jeanty's first break into comics was Paradigm #1 (1994) published by Caliber Comics. Soon after, he worked on the "bad girl" comics for London Night Studios, featuring various characters like Poizon, Stryke, and Razor. Moving to Atlanta in 1999, Jeanty joined the ranks of Atlanta-based Gaijin Studios.

After breaking in at DC Comics, on titles like Green Lantern, Superboy, and Superman, Marvel Comics offered Jeanty his first regular ongoing monthly series- Bishop: The Last X-Man (1999). Jeanty's Marvel work also included X-Men: Gambit, Astonishing X-Men: Gambit, Deadpool, Weapon X, and the X-Men Legends II: Rise of Apocalypse mini-comic for the Activision video game. During this time, in 2003, Jeanty left Gaijin Studios and after a year, formed Atlanta-based Studio Revolver, with Dexter Vines, Tom Feister, Brian Reiber, and Tariq Hassan.

In 2006, DC Comics imprint, Wildstorm Comics paired Jeanty with Hollywood screenwriter John Ridley, for The American Way, an eight-issue comic book mini-series that presented a skewed parallel history of the civil unrest during 1960s America, where the United States Government created its own "superheroes" and "villains" and arranged fake fights to influence public opinions.

=== Buffy the Vampire Slayer ===
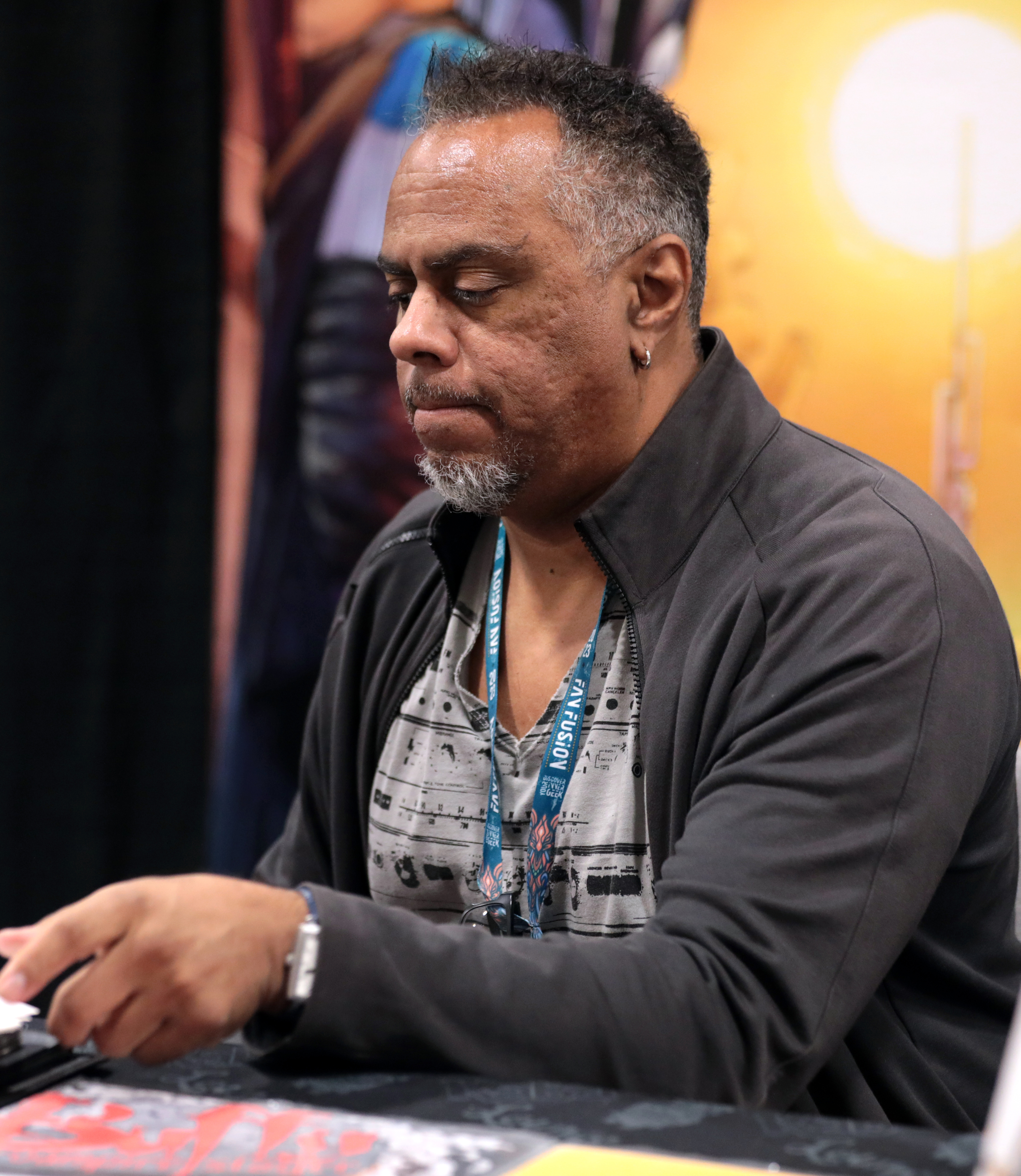
Jeanty at the 2023 Phoenix Fan Fusion

While completing The American Way, Jeanty was contacted by Dark Horse Comics' Senior Managing Editor, Scott Allie, who asked if he was interested in working on a Buffy the Vampire Slayer Season Eight comic book. Buffy's creator, Joss Whedon, who had been a fan of Jeanty's work since Bishop: the Last X-Man, specifically asked for him. This was not the movie and television character's first foray into comics, between 1998 and 2004, Dark Horse Comics published various Buffy comics when the television show was on air, but not all the comics were considered canon. However, this new comic book series was to be the canonical continuation of the popular television series that aired for seven years, hence its name.

Jeanty started penciling the first issue of Season Eight immediately after completing The American Way, working closely with Joss Whedon in bringing the television series to the comic book world. In doing this, Whedon strictly wanted "comic book stylized" versions of the Buffy characters, that carry the essence of their television counterparts, without looking like redrawn picture stills.

Much attention to detail still goes into rendering these stylized versions, Jeanty saying, "It takes me 30% more time to do a Buffy page than, say, a Gambit page, because of the likenesses. But how hard is my job when I get to sit around all day and draw Sarah Michelle Gellar, Alyson Hannigan, or Michelle Trachtenberg?"

Over the course of Season Eight, Jeanty also worked with alumni Buffy writer Jane Espenson, and comic book writers Brian K. Vaughn, Jeph Loeb, and Brad Meltzer. Jeanty also created variant covers for most of the comic book series, which would go on to be nominated for the 2008 Eisner Award for Best New Series.

The complete series was later collected into seven trade paperbacks which were regularly listed on The New York Times Graphic Books Best Seller List.

=== Critical response to the series ===
Jeanty's artwork on Season Eight received praise for successfully capturing the essence, excitement, and humor of the television show, without looking like a media tie-in. Mathew Springer stated, "He brings these people to life not as drawings of actors and actresses, but as fully realized comic book characters in their own right." Buffy creator, Joss Whedon, stated that while looking for an artist for Buffy Season Eight, he desired someone that was "good at capturing the likenesses [of the characters], but did not draw a weak... non-comic that reeks of licensing." And that, "Georges mixes both abilities with a grace and power not seen since Superman vs. Muhammad Ali."

Mark Stoddard complimented Whedon's choice of Jeanty, saying, "his layouts and storytelling are clear, he handles the action sequences pretty well, and the character likenesses are excellent, retaining a sense of artistic individuality, rather than simply generating portraits or rehashing television stills". There was also some initial debate among Buffy fans and critics over Joss Whedon's art style choice. Keith McDuffee thought Jeanty's pencils "have a bit to be desired" compared to the photo-realistic artwork on the covers. However, Richard George of IGN praised Jeanty's work as a good compromise between real life and comics, urging readers not to compare Jeanty's interior art to Jo Chen's photo-realistic cover style, and that "Both styles have their place".

=== Motion and online comics ===
Fox Home Entertainment produced motion comics based on the first 19 issues of Buffy the Vampire Slayer: Season Eight. The first motion comic debuted on Amazon Video on Demand and iTunes on July 19, 2010. The Blu-ray and DVD of the motion comic series was released on January 4, 2011.

Jeanty pencilled an 8-page Spike story written by Jane Espenson that will be available as an online comic book from Dark Horse Comics.

During WonderCon 2011, Dark Horse Comics officially announced that Jeanty will return as regular artist for Buffy The Vampire Slayer: Season Nine. Joining him, as inker, will be Jeanty's former studio mate from Studio Revolver, Dexter Vines.

=== Serenity: Leaves on the Wind ===
In Jan 2014, Dark Horse Comics released Serenity: Leaves on the Wind, a six-issue comic book series with art by Jeanty that continues the story of Joss Whedon's cult television show Firefly, and its subsequent film adaptation Serenity. The comic is written by Zack Whedon and executive produced by Joss Whedon, and continues the story roughly 39 weeks after the events of the film.

A self-confessed fan of the Firefly television show, Jeanty told an interviewer that his work on the Serenity series borrows its inspiration from films with a "rustic futuristic feel" and has discussed the challenge of transitioning from the Buffy series to a series with a much darker tone in both visual content and in story content.

=== John Walker: U.S. Agent ===
In 2020, Jeanty illustrated the five-issue mini-series John Walker: U.S. Agent, written by Christopher Priest.

=== The Mandalorian ===
In 2022, Jeanty illustrated The Mandalorian: Season One for Marvel Comics, written by Rodney Barnes and adapting the first season of the Disney+ series The Mandalorian.

== Personal life ==
Jeanty was raised by his mother in Miami Beach, Florida along with three younger siblings. In early 2011, Jeanty left Studio Revolver in Atlanta and relocated to Long Beach, California, but has since returned to Atlanta, Georgia.

== Awards ==
- Nominated: 2008 Eisner Award for Best New Series for Buffy The Vampire Slayer: Season Eight
