= X-Men Unlimited =

Anthology comic book series, 1993–2024

- Textless cover of X-Men Unlimited vol. 2 #11 (December 2005). Art by Mike Deodato Jr. and Rain Beredo.

Publication information
- Publisher: Marvel Comics
- Schedule: Monthly
- Format: Ongoing series
- Genre: Superhero
- Publication date: June 1993 – June 2024
- No. of issues: Vol. 1 : 50; Vol. 2: 14; Infinity Comic Vol. 1: 142

Creative team
- Written by: List: Vol. 1; Scott Lobdell; Chris Claremont; John Francis Moore; Larry Hama; Terry Kavanagh; Fabian Nicieza; Vol. 2; Chris Claremont; C.B. Cebulski; Stuart Moore; Tony Bedard; Brian K. Vaughan; Mike Carey; Infinity Comic Vol. 1; Jonathan Hickman; Gerry Duggan; Steve Orlando; Tini Howard; Declan Shalvey; Alek Paknadel; Lauren Amaro
- Penciller: List: Vol. 1; Chris Bachalo; Jim Lee; Joe Madureira; Adam Kubert; Tom Grummett; Bryan Hitch; Vol. 2; Dave Wilkins; Laco Medina; Mike Deodato Jr.; David Finch; Roger Cruz; Leinil Francis Yu; Infinity Comic Vol. 1; Declan Shalvey; Matteo Lolli; Alan Robinson; Emilio Laiso; David Messina; Lucas Werneck
- Inker: List: Vol. 1; Scott Williams; Tim Townsend; Mark Farmer; Dan Green; Art Thibert; Al Milgrom Vol. 2; Mark Morales; Tim Townsend; Troy Hubbs; Dexter Vines; Matt Banning; Norm Rapmund; Infinity Comic Vol. 1; Matteo Lolli; Alan Robinson; Emilio Laiso; David Messina; Lucas Werneck; Oren Junior

X-Men Unlimited is the name of three comic book titles published by Marvel Comics. It is an anthology series, featuring standalone stories centered on members of the X-Men or other mutant characters. It explores character backstories, alternate storylines, and peripheral events outside the main X-Men continuity, mostly through self-contained stories that some of which supplement the core X-Men titles like Uncanny X-Men or X-Men.

The series debuted in June 1993 and ran for 49 issues until 2003, transitioning from a bimonthly to a monthly schedule. The second run lasted from 2004 to 2006 and produced 25 issues before the title was paused. The series was later relaunched in 2021 as a digital-exclusive Infinity Comics title. This run, tied to the Krakoan Age during which mutants established their own nation, featured supplementary stories that expanded the X-Men universe without disrupting the primary plotlines of the core titles.

== Volume 1 ==
This title allowed new and lesser-known writers and artists to write and draw X-Men comics. The comics were also usually self-contained stories; with the exception of a tie-in to the Onslaught crossover. This was particularly unique during the late 1990s when most X-Men titles frequently had story arcs that were several issues long. It ran as a quarterly feature releasing four issues per year until late 2002 when it converted into a monthly title.

== Volume 2 ==
The second series ran from early 2004 to early 2006. The series' final issue was in June 2006. Each issue contained two short self-contained stories; in almost every case each story would focus specifically on one character, giving an in-depth glimpse into their psyche.

== Infinity Comic ==
X-Men Unlimited Infinity Comic was part of the Reign of X line of the X-Men comics featuring a rotating adventures of the Krakoan mutants, with the first arc featuring Wolverine's battle against A.I.M. This title was released in weekly chapters exclusively in Marvel's Infinity Comics. It later became part of the Destiny of X and Fall of X line.

== Collected editions ==
=== Collected editions – listed by book ===
Title	Material collected	Publication date	ISBN
X-Men: Fatal Attractions	X-Men Unlimited #1–2; Plus Uncanny X-Men #298–305, 315 and Annual #17; X-Factor #87–92; X-Force#25; X-Men Vol. 2 #25; Wolverine Vol. 2 #75; and Excalibur #71.	May 2, 2012	978-0785162452
X-Men: The Wedding of Cyclops & Phoenix	X-Men Unlimited #3; Plus X-Men Vol. 2 #27–30, X-Men Annual #2; Uncanny X-Men #308–310, Uncanny X-Men Annual #18; X-Men: The Wedding Album; What If Vol. 2 #60	October 2012	0-7851-6290-9
X-Men: Legionquest	X-Men Unlimited #4–7; Plus X-Men Vol. 2 #38–41, X-Men Annual #3; Uncanny X-Men #318–321; X-Factor #107–109; Cable #20	April 2018	978-1302910389
X-Men: Road to Onslaught Vol. 1	X-Men Unlimited #8, Plus Uncanny X-Men #322–326; X-Men: Prime; X-Men Vol. 2 #42–45; X-Men Annual '95;	February 2014	978-0-7851-8825-4
X-Men: Road to Onslaught Vol. 2	X-Men Unlimited #9; Plus Uncanny X-Men #327–328; X-Men/Clandestine 1–2; X-Men Vol. 2 #46–49; X-Men Annual '95; Sabretooth #1	July 2014	978-07851-8830-8
X-Men: Road to Onslaught Vol. 3	X-Men Unlimited #10; Plus Uncanny X-Men #329–332; X-Men/Brood #1–2; X-Men Vol. 2 #50–52; Wolverine Vol. 2 #101; Archangel #1; Xavier Institute Alumni Yearbook	January 2015	978-07851-9005-9
X-Men/Avengers: Onslaught Omnibus	X-Men Unlimited #11; Plus Cable #32–36; Uncanny X-Men #333–337; X-Force #55, 57–58; X-Man 15–19; X-Men Vol. 2 #53–57, Annual '96; Onslaught: X-Men, Marvel Universe, Epilogue; Avengers #401–402; Fantastic Four #415; Incredible Hulk #444–445; Wolverine Vol. 2 #104–105; X-Factor #125–126; Amazing Spider-Man #415; Green Goblin #12; Spider-Man #72; Iron Man #332; Punisher Vol. 2 #11; Thor #502; X-Men: Road to Onslaught #1; material from Excalibur #100, Fantastic Four #416	July 2015	978-0785192626
X-Men: Onslaught Aftermath	X-Men Unlimited #12–14; Uncanny X-Men #338–340; X-Men #58–61; X-Men Annual '97; Uncanny X-Men Annual '96–97; X-Factor #130	April, 2019	978-1302916510
X-Men: Blue: Volume 0: Reunion	X-Men Unlimited #17; Uncanny X-Men #351–359; Uncanny X-Men/Fantastic Four Annual 1998; Cerebro's Guide to the X-Men	March, 2018	978-1302909536
X-Men: The Hunt for Professor X	X-Men Unlimited #22; Plus Uncanny X-Men #360–365; X-Men Vol. 2 #80-84, 1/2	June 2015	978-0785197201
X-Men: The Magneto War	X-Men Unlimited #23, material from #24;Uncanny X-Men #366–371; Magneto Rex #1–3; X-Men: The Magneto War; X-Men (vol. 2) #85–91; X-Men Annual '99;	October 2018	978-1302913762
X-Men vs Apocalypse: The Twelve Omnibus	X-Men Unlimited (2003) #24–26 (#24 a-story only); Uncanny X-Men #371–380 and Annual'99; X-Men #91-99 and Annual'99 (#94, a-story only); Astonishing X-Men #1–3; Wolverine #145–149; Gambit #8-9; Cable #71–78; X-Man #59–60; X-51 #8; X-Force #101; X-Men Yearbook 1999	February 2020	978-1302922870
X-Men Vs. Apocalypse Vol. 2: Ages of Apocalypse	X-Men Unlimited #26; Plus X-51 #8, Uncanny X-Men #378 and Annual 1999, Cable #77, Wolverine Vol. 2 #148, X-Men Vol. 2 #98, and X-Men: The Search of Cyclops #1-4	September 2008	978-0785122647
X-Men: Revolution By Chris Claremont Omnibus	X-Men Unlimited (2003) #27–29; Uncanny X-Men #381–389; X-Men #100–109 and Annual 2000; X-Men: Black Sun #1–5; Bishop: The Last X-Man #15–16; Cable #87	August 2018	978-1302912147
X-Men: Eve of Destruction	X-Men Unlimited (2003) #30–33; Uncanny X-Men #390–393 and Annual 2000; X-Men #110–113; X-Men: Forever #1–6; X-Men: Declassified; X-Men: The Search for Cyclops #1–4; Magneto: Dark Seduction #1–4	July 2019	978-1302918255
X-Men Legends Vol. 4: Hated & Feared	X-Men Unlimited #31, 35–36, 38, 40, 42, 46–49	December 2003	978-0785113508
Starjammers	X-Men Unlimited #32; Starjammers (1995) #1–4, Starjammers (2004) #1–6	June 2019	978-1302918699
Counter X: Generation X - Four Days	X-Men Unlimited #34; Generation X #71–75	February 2013	978-0785167303
New X-Men Companion	X-Men Unlimited (2003) #35, 37–39, 46–47, 49–50; X-Men Unlimited (2004) #1; material from X-Men Unlimited (1993) #34, 36, 40–43, 48	July 2019	978-1302918415
Exiles Vol. 5: Unnatural Instincts	X-Men Unlimited #41, plus Exiles #26–30	July 2006	0-7851-1110-7
New Mutants: Back to School	X-Men Unlimited #42–43; New Mutants vol. 2 #1–13	January 2018	9-781302-910327
X-Men: Unstoppable	X-Men Unlimited #44–45; Uncanny X-Men vol. 1 #410–424	February 2019	978-1302916121
Astonishing X-Men Companion	X-Men Unlimited vol. 2 #2–14, Giant-Size X-Men (2005) #3–4, Mythos: X-Men (2006) #1; material from Free comicbook Day 2006 (X-Men/Runaways)	May 2020	9781302922856
District X vol.2 Underground	X-Men Unlimited vol. 2 #2 (a-story); District X #7–14	October 2005	0-7851-1602-8
Gambit: Thieves' World – Complete Collection	X-Men Unlimited vol. 2 #3 (a-story); Gambit (2004) #1–12	March 2019	978-1302916053
New X-Men: The Quest for Magik - The Complete Collection	X-Men Unlimited vol. 2 #14 (a-story); New X-Men (2004) #33–39, #40–42 (A Stories), #43; X-Infernus #1–4, Saga; material from X-Men: Divided We Stand #2	July 2019	978-1302918378

=== Collected editions – listed by story ===
Volume	Issue	Story Title	Primary Cast	Book Title	Format	Publication date	ISBN
1	1	Follow the Leader	X-Men (Professor X, Storm, Cyclops)	X-Men: Fatal Attractions Omnibus X-Men Epic Collection Vol. 22: Legacies	OHC TPB	May 2, 2012 March 28, 2023	978-0785162452 978-1302951115
1	2	Point Blank	Magneto	X-Men: Fatal Attractions Omnibus X-Men Epic Collection Vol 23: Fatal Attractions	OHC	May 2, 2012	978-0785162452
1	3	The Whispers Scream	Sabretooth / Charles Xavier	X-Men: The Wedding of Cyclops & Phoenix Omnibus; X-Men: Blue & Gold - Bloodties Omnibus	OHC	September 2018	978-1302913229
1	4	Theories of Relativity	Mystique, Nightcrawler and Rogue	X-Men: Legionquest OHC; Excalibur Omnibus Vol 3; X-Men: Blue & Gold - Bloodties Omnibus	OHC	April 2018	978-1302910389
1	5	Hard Promises	Xavier & Lilandra	X-Men: Legionquest OHC; X-Men: Blue & Gold - Bloodties Omnibus	OHC	April 2018	978-1302910389
1	6	Primal Scream	Cyclops, Jean, Havok & Polaris (in Savage Land)	X-Men: Legionquest OHC	OHC	April 2018	978-1302910389
1	7	Memories	Storm	X-Men: Legionquest OHC	OHC	April 2018	978-1302910389
1	8	First Contact	Bolt (Chris Bradley)	X-Men: Road to Onslaught Vol. 1; X-Men: Road to Onslaught Omnibus Vol. 1	Tpb	February 2014	978-0-7851-8825-4
1	9	Horse Latitudes	X-Men	X-Men: Road to Onslaught Vol. 2; X-Men: Road to Onslaught Omnibus Vol. 1	Tpb	July 2014	978-07851-8830-8
1	10	Need to Know	Beast & Dark Beast	X-Men: Road to Onslaught Vol. 3; X-Men: Road to Onslaught Omnibus Vol. 2	Tpb	January 2015	978-07851-9005-9
1	11	Adrift	Rogue & Joseph	X-Men/Avengers: Onslaught Omnibus	OHC	July 2015	978-0785192626
1	12	The Once and Future Juggernaut	Juggernaut	X-Men: Onslaught Aftermath Omnibus	Tpb	March 2019	978-1302916510
1	13	(a) Fugitive From Space	X-Men, Binary, Silver Surfer & Shi'Ar	X-Men: Onslaught Aftermath Omnibus	Tpb	March 2019	978-1302916510
1	13	(b) Junction	Juggernaut	X-Men: Onslaught Aftermath Omnibus	Tpb	March 2019	978-1302916510
1	14	Innocence Lost	Franklin Richards	X-Men: Onslaught Aftermath Omnibus	Tpb	March 2019	978-1302916510
1	15	Second Contact	Bolt (Chris Bradley) & Maverick	X-Men: Onslaught Aftermath Omnibus	OHC	July 2025	978-1302964191
1	16	Primal	Generation X – Banshee & Emma Frost (Operation Zero Tolerance tie-in)	Generation X Epic Collection Vol 3: The Secret of M	TPB	June, 2023	
1	17	Alone in his head	Wolverine, Angel & Sabretooth	X-Men: Blue: Volume 0: Reunion	Tpb	March, 2018	978-1302909536
1	18	(a) Once an X-Man…	Gambit	X-Men: Gambit – The Complete Collection, Volume 1	Tpb	March, 2016	978-0785196853
1	18	(b) Guiding Light	Marrow	X-Men: Gold: Volume 0: Homecoming	Tpb	March, 2018	978-1302909543
1	19	Unforgiven	Excalibur – Nightcrawler & Daytripper (Magik II)	Excalibur Epic Collection Vol 9: You Are Cordially Invited; Excalibur Omnibus Vol 4	TPB	October 2023	
1	20	Where the Wild Things Were	Generation X	Generation X Epic Collection Vol 4: Pride and Penance	TPB	May 2024	
1	21	Devil's Haircut	X-Factor – Strong Guy, Multiple Man, Wolfsbane & Beast	UNCOLLECTED			
1	22	Cat & Mouse	X-Men	X-Men: The Hunt for Professor X	Tpb	June 2015	978-0785197201
1	23	Lessons	X-Men	X-Men: The Magneto War	Tpb	October 2018	978-1302913762
1	24	(a) Search & Destroy	Wolverine & Cecelia Reyes	X-Men vs. Apocalypse: The Twelve Omnibus	OHC	February 2020	978-1302922870
1	24	(b) Aftermath	Magneto	X-Men: The Magneto War	Tpb	October 2018	978-1302913762
1	25	(a) In Remembrance	X-Men (Epilogue to X-Men vol.2 #95)	X-Men vs. Apocalypse: The Twelve Omnibus	OHC	February 2020	978-1302922870
1	25	(b) Game	Wolverine	X-Men vs. Apocalypse: The Twelve Omnibus	OHC	February 2020	978-1302922870
1	26	(a) Day Of Judgement	X-Men (Ages of Apocalypse crossover)	X-Men Vs. Apocalypse Vol. 2: Ages of Apocalypse	Tpb	September 2008	978-0785122647
1	26	(a) Day Of Judgement	X-Men (Ages of Apocalypse crossover)	X-Men vs. Apocalypse: The Twelve Omnibus	OHC	February 2020	978-1302922870
1	26	(b) Full Circle	Wolverine	X-Men vs. Apocalypse: The Twelve Omnibus	OHC	February 2020	978-1302922870
1	27	New Dawn Rising	X-Men, Thunderbird III	X-Men: Revolution By Chris Claremont Omnibus	OHC	August 2018	978-1302912147
1	28	(a) A Plague Among Us	X-Men	X-Men: Revolution By Chris Claremont Omnibus	OHC	August 2018	978-1302912147
1	28	(b) Garden State Slaughter	Deadpool	X-Men: Revolution By Chris Claremont Omnibus; Deadpool Classic Omnibus	OHC	August 2018	978-1302912147
1	29	(a) Renewed Acquaintances (Maximum Security Crossover)	X-Men, Bishop, Ms Marvel	X-Men: Revolution By Chris Claremont Omnibus	OHC	August 2018	978-1302912147
1	29	(b) Tempered Steel	Colossus & Wolverine	X-Men: Revolution By Chris Claremont Omnibus	OHC	August 2018	978-1302912147
1	30	(a) Banshee's Angels in: Mother Knows Best	Jubilee, Husk & M	X-Men: Eve of Destruction; Generation X Epic Collection Vol 6: Counter X	OHC	July 2019	978-1302918255
1	30	(b) Covenant With The Devil	Nightcrawler	X-Men: Eve of Destruction	OHC	July 2019	978-1302918255
1	30	(c) Wild and Free	Rogue	X-Men: Eve of Destruction	OHC	July 2019	978-1302918255
1	30	(d) Seeds of War	Wolverine & Quicksilver	X-Men: Eve of Destruction	OHC	July 2019	978-1302918255
1	31	(a) Monsters	Rogue & Jean Grey	X-Men: Eve of Destruction	OHC	July 2019	978-1302918255
1	31	(b) Hindsight	Cyclops	X-Men: Eve of Destruction	OHC	July 2019	978-1302918255
1	31	(c) Gold	X-Man	X-Men: Eve of Destruction	OHC	July 2019	978-1302918255
1	32	(a) Dazzler : Beyond the Music	Dazzler	X-Men: Eve of Destruction	OHC	July 2019	978-1302918255
1	32	(b) The Gift	Nightcrawler	X-Men: Eve of Destruction	OHC	July 2019	978-1302918255
1	32	(c) All's Swell that ends Swell	Starjammers	X-Men: Eve of Destruction	OHC	July 2019	978-1302918255
1	33	(a) The Blob	Blob	X-Men: Eve of Destruction	OHC	July 2019	978-1302918255
1	33	(b) Special Attraction	Sentinel	X-Men: Eve of Destruction	OHC	July 2019	978-1302918255
1	33	(c) The Sport of Queens	Emma Frost & Selene	X-Men: Eve of Destruction	OHC	July 2019	978-1302918255
1	33	(d) The Grand Illusion	Mastermind	X-Men: Eve of Destruction	OHC	July 2019	978-1302918255
1	33	(e) Survival of the Fittest	Magneto	X-Men: Eve of Destruction	OHC	July 2019	978-1302918255
1	33	(f) Lucky Day	Sabretooth	X-Men: Eve of Destruction	OHC	July 2019	978-1302918255
1	34	(a) My Name In Lights	Generation X - Jubilee & Skin	Counter X: Generation X - Four Days; Generation X Epic Collection Vol 6: Counter X	Tpb	February 2013	978-0785167303
1	34	(b) Twisted Sisters	Generation X - Emma Frost	Counter X: Generation X - Four Days; Generation X Epic Collection Vol 6: Counter X	Tpb	February 2013	978-0785167303
1	34	(c) Underworld	Sunfire	New X-Men Companion	Tpb	July 2019	978-1302918415
1	35	(a) Triptych	Jean Grey & Sabretooth	New X-Men Companion	Tpb	July 2019	978-1302918415
1	35	(b) Unhappy Anniversary	Rogue & Wolverine	New X-Men Companion	Tpb	July 2019	978-1302918415
1	35	(c) X-Men: The Untold Story	X-Men Movie being filmed	New X-Men Companion	Tpb	July 2019	978-1302918415
1	36	(a) This One's For You!	Kitty Pryde (Mekanix prelude)	Marvel Universe by Chris Claremont Omnibus; X-Treme X-Men Omnibus Volume 1; X-Treme X-Men Volume 4: Mekanix	OHC	August 2017	978-1302907150
1	36	(a) This One's For You!	Kitty Pryde (Mekanix prelude)	Marvel Universe by Chris Claremont Omnibus; X-Treme X-Men Omnibus Volume 1; X-Treme X-Men Volume 4: Mekanix	Tpb	June 2003	978-0785111177
1	36	(a) This One's For You!	Kitty Pryde (Mekanix prelude)	Marvel Universe by Chris Claremont Omnibus; X-Treme X-Men Omnibus Volume 1; X-Treme X-Men Volume 4: Mekanix	Omnibus	July 2022	
1	36	(b) The End of the Line	Magneto	New X-Men Companion	Tpb	July 2019	978-1302918415
1	36	(c) Stray	Beast	New X-Men Companion	Tpb	July 2019	978-1302918415
1	37	Sacrificial Worlds	X-Men	New X-Men Companion	Tpb	July 2019	978-1302918415
1	38	Yartzeit	Kitty Pryde mourning Colossus	New X-Men Companion	Tpb	July 2019	978-1302918415
1	39	(a) The Final Alternative	Storm & Magneto (circa Uncanny X-Men #170)	New X-Men Companion	Tpb	July 2019	978-1302918415
1	39	(b) Wounded Animals	Storm & Sunfire (X-Treme era, post XXM #19)	New X-Men Companion	Tpb	July 2019	978-1302918415
1	39	(c) Rebirth	Storm & Yukio (during Uncanny X-Men #173)	New X-Men Companion	Tpb	July 2019	978-1302918415
1	39	(c) Rebirth	Storm & Yukio (during Uncanny X-Men #173)	X-Treme X-Men Omnibus Volume 2	Omnibus	December 2023	
1	40	(a) Hunters	Sabretooth	New X-Men Companion	Tpb	July 2019	978-1302918415
1	40	(b) Animals	Sabretooth	X-Men: Trial of the Juggernaut	Tpb	October 2019	978-1302920371
1	40	(c) Slam	Juggernaut	New X-Men Companion	Tpb	July 2019	978-1302918415
1	41	(a) Dark and Scary Things	Exiles	Exiles Complete Collection vol.2	Tpb	August 2009	978-0785138884
1	41	(b) A Hard Day's Fight	X-Statix	X-Statix Omnibus	OHC	March 2011	0-7851-5844-8
1	41	(c) Something in the Air	Mutant teenager	New X-Men Companion	Tpb	July 2019	978-1302918415
1	42	(a) Ice Queen	Emma Frost	New X-Men Companion	Tpb	July 2019	978-1302918415
1	42	(b) Fear	Dani Moonstar	New Mutants: Back to School - Complete Collection	Tpb	January 2018	978-1302915681
1	42	(c) It's the Thought that Counts	Jean Grey	New X-Men Companion	Tpb	July 2019	978-1302918415
1	42	(d) The Sound of Music	Charles Xavier	New X-Men Companion	Tpb	July 2019	978-1302918415
1	43	(a) Keepsake	Rahne Sinclair	New Mutants: Back to School - Complete Collection	Tpb	January 2018	978-1302915681
1	43	(b) Lockheed, the Dragon	Kitty Pryde & Lockheed	New X-Men Companion	Tpb	July 2019	978-1302918415
1	44	Can They Suffer?	Juggernaut & Squidboy	X-Men: Unstoppable	Tpb	February 2019	978-1302916121
1	45	Hero	Alpha Flight & X-Men	X-Men: Unstoppable	Tpb	February 2019	978-1302916121
1	46	(a) Weapon of Choice	Wolverine	New X-Men Companion	Tpb	July 2019	978-1302918415
1	46	(b) Upon Reflection	Wolverine	New X-Men Companion	Tpb	July 2019	978-1302918415
1	47	(a) Bloody 'ell	Wolverine, remembering Psylocke	New X-Men Companion	Tpb	July 2019	978-1302918415
1	47	(b) Strange Harvest	Cyclops	New X-Men Companion	Tpb	July 2019	978-1302918415
1	48	(a) untitled	Wolverine & Shanna the She-Devil	New X-Men Companion	Tpb	July 2019	978-1302918415
1	48	(b) Control	Mystique	X-Men: Unstoppable	Tpb	February 2019	978-1302916121
1	49	untitled	Cyclops & Nightcrawler	New X-Men Companion	Tpb	July 2019	978-1302918415
1	50	The Swordsmith	Wolverine	New X-Men Companion	Tpb	July 2019	978-1302918415
2	1	(a) Memories	Sage	New X-Men Companion	Tpb	July 2019	978-1302918415
2	1	(b) The Most Wonderful Time of the Year	X-Men	New X-Men Companion	Tpb	July 2019	978-1302918415
2	2	(a) District X	Bishop (District X series prelude)	District X vol. 2 Underground	Tpb	October 2005	0-7851-1602-8
2	2	(a) District X	Bishop (District X series prelude)	Astonishing X-Men Companion	Tpb	May 2020	9781302922856
2	2	(b) All the Rage	Jubilee	Astonishing X-Men Companion	Tpb	May 2020	9781302922856
2	3	(a) I'm just a poor boy	Gambit	Gambit: Thieves' World – Complete Collection	Tpb	March 2019	978-1302916053
2	3	(a) I'm just a poor boy	Gambit	Astonishing X-Men Companion	Tpb	May 2020	9781302922856
2	3	(b) Brothers	Icarus & Cannonball	Astonishing X-Men Companion	Tpb	May 2020	9781302922856
2	4	(a) Testing Times	Juggernaut	Astonishing X-Men Companion	Tpb	May 2020	9781302922856
2	4	(b) Mutual Secrets	Emma Frost	Astonishing X-Men Companion	Tpb	May 2020	9781302922856
2	5	(a) Follow The Leader	Wolverine and Cyclops	Astonishing X-Men Companion	Tpb	May 2020	9781302922856
2	5	(b) Bar Stools	Wolverine	Astonishing X-Men Companion	Tpb	May 2020	9781302922856
2	6	(a) Tempest in a Teapot	Shadowcat, Storm, Emma Frost & Sage	Astonishing X-Men Companion	Tpb	May 2020	9781302922856
2	6	(b) Contact	Rogue & Marvel Girl (Rachel)	Astonishing X-Men Companion	Tpb	May 2020	9781302922856
2	7	(a) Double Feature	Nightcrawler	Astonishing X-Men Companion	Tpb	May 2020	9781302922856
2	7	(b) The Boy Who Wasn't There	Shadowcat	Astonishing X-Men Companion	Tpb	May 2020	9781302922856
2	8	(a) Wings Over the World	Archangel	Astonishing X-Men Companion	Tpb	May 2020	9781302922856
2	8	(b) A Night at the Opera	Shadowcat & Beast	Astonishing X-Men Companion	Tpb	May 2020	9781302922856
2	9	(a) Dead Man Walking	Wolverine	Uncanny X-Men: The Complete Collection by Matt Fraction Vol. 1	Tpb	December 2012	978-0785165934
2	9	(a) Dead Man Walking	Wolverine	Astonishing X-Men Companion	Tpb	May 2020	9781302922856
2	9	(b) Resignation	Iceman	Astonishing X-Men Companion	Tpb	May 2020	9781302922856
2	10	(a) After-school Special	Beast	Astonishing X-Men Companion	Tpb	May 2020	9781302922856
2	10	(b) Ghost in the Graveyard	Beast	Astonishing X-Men Companion	Tpb	May 2020	9781302922856
2	11	(a) Brother's Keeper	Marvel Girl (Rachel) & Havok	Astonishing X-Men Companion	Tpb	May 2020	9781302922856
2	11	(b) So this Guy Walks up to a Fruit Whipz Counter...	Sunspot & Cannonball	Astonishing X-Men Companion	Tpb	May 2020	9781302922856
2	12	(a) The Healing	Wolverine, remembering Jean	Astonishing X-Men Companion	Tpb	May 2020	9781302922856
2	12	(b) Pain is Necessary, Suffering is Optional	Wolverine & Puck	Astonishing X-Men Companion	Tpb	May 2020	9781302922856
2	13	(a) Blind Love	Mesmero (Decimation Tie-in)	Astonishing X-Men Companion; X-Men Decimation Omnibus	Tpb	May 2020	9781302922856
2	13	(b) A Wonderful Life	Decimation Tie-in – depowered Mutant tale	Astonishing X-Men Companion; X-Men Decimation Omnibus	Tpb	May 2020	9781302922856
2	14	(a) Dying Inside	Colossus, remembering Illyana	New X-Men: The Quest for Magik - The Complete Collection	Tpb	July 2019	978-1302918378
2	14	(a) Dying Inside	Colossus, remembering Illyana	Astonishing X-Men Companion	Tpb	May 2020	9781302922856
2	14	(b) How to be an Artist	Colossus	Astonishing X-Men Companion	Tpb	May 2020	9781302922856

== See also ==
- List of X-Men comics
