= Deadpool V Gambit =

2016 limited series published by Marvel Comics

- Cover of Deadpool V Gambit #1 (June 2016). Art by Danilo Beyruth

Publication information
- Publisher: Marvel Comics
- Schedule: Monthly
- Format: Limited series
- Publication date: August – November 2016
- No. of issues: 5
- Main character(s): Deadpool; Gambit

Creative team
- Written by: Ben Acker; Ben Blacker
- Artist: Danilo Beyruth

Collected editions
- Deadpool V Gambit: The "V" is for "Vs.": ISBN 978-1302901790

Deadpool V Gambit, subtitled "The 'V' is for 'VS'," is an American comic book series published by Marvel Comics, featuring Deadpool and Gambit as its main protagonists. The story explores the characters' pre X-Men relationship, and is another in a series of limited print runs where Deadpool battles another character from the Marvel Universe. The series lasted 5 issues, from August to November 2016, and was written by Ben Acker and Ben Blacker with art from Danilo Beyruth.

== Publication history ==
Deadpool V Gambit is part of a line of Deadpool-oriented limited series, which includes Deadpool vs. X-Force (2014), Deadpool vs. Carnage (2014), Hawkeye vs. Deadpool (2014-2015), Deadpool vs. Thanos (2015), and Deadpool vs. The Punisher (2017). Marvel announced the miniseries at the 2016 conference of the Comics Professional Retail Organization, the trade organization for comic book specialty shops. The series' creation was influenced by the release of the Deadpool film, which was then enjoying box office and critical success, a Gambit film that was in development, and of the then recently released Batman v Superman: Dawn of Justice, of which the title of the series is in reference to. The series made frequent use of some lesser known characters, especially from the Iron Fist franchise, and Acker noted that "It's just as fun to elevate lesser-known characters as it is to bring popular characters down to our level." Blacker mentioned that they had submitted a proposal to expand the miniseries into a full Deadpool v. Gambit ongoing series, which he hoped would be approved in early 2017, although it was ultimately rejected, leaving Deadpool V Gambit a simple miniseries.

== Reception ==
The series holds a 7.5 out of 10 on comics review aggregator Comic Book Roundup, indicating generally favorable reviews. User reviews, which are not required to submit comments alongside the scores, give the comic a 6.8 out of 10, indicating mixed reviews. The first two comics were poorly received, with scores of 5.9 and 5.2 for #1 and #2 respectively, but issues #3 and #4 had scores of 8.5 and 7.5.

Critics generally praised the art of Beyruth, but were critical of the writing and the structure of the story. Mark Hassenfratz of ComicsVerse said that he had low expectations of the series due to Deadpool's "overexposure" after the release of his solo movie, but indicated that he enjoyed the first issue "way more" than he thought he would. John McCubbin of Snap Pow called the first issue "strange and muddled" and lacking focus, but also said he believed the first issue "showed some promise, even if it came during the last page."

== Sales ==
The series remained in the Diamond Comic Distributors Top 100 Comics list for its entire publication run. The first issue peaked at 37th for overall sales in June 2016, with a dollar ranking of 28th, selling an estimated 65,773 issues. The series fell in rank during the publication's run, and its lowest point was 79th in August 2016 with 38,173 issues, though the final issue did move back up to 75th.

Deadpool V Gambit: The "V" is for "Vs." -- Comichron and Diamond Comic Distributors
Issue	Rank	Units (est.)	Ref
1	37	65,773	
2	48	49,815	
3	69	42,561	
4	77	38,173	
5	75	36,316	
