= Bella Donna (character) =

Fictional character appearing in Marvel Comics

- Bella Donna, as depicted in interior artwork from Gambit (Vol. 3) #18 (July 2000).

Publication information
- Publisher: Marvel Comics
- First appearance: X-Men (vol. 2) #8 (May 1992)
- Created by: Scott Lobdell (writer); Jim Lee (artist)

In-story information
- Alter ego: Bella Donna Boudreaux
- Species: Human mutant
- Place of origin: New Orleans, Louisiana
- Team affiliations: Assassins Guild; United Guilds
- Notable aliases: Belladonna; Belle
- Abilities: Astral projection; Plasma blasts

Bella Donna Boudreaux is a character appearing in American comic books published by Marvel Comics. Created by writer Scott Lobdell and artist Jim Lee, the character first appeared in X-Men (vol. 2) #8 (May 1992). Bella Donna is a member of the Assassins Guild. She has been involved in a star-crossed romance with the superhero Gambit, a member of the Thieves Guild.

== Publication history ==
Bella Donna debuted in X-Men (vol. 2) #8 (May 1992), created by Scott Lobdel and Jim Lee. She appeared in the 1993 Gambit series, the 1994 Rogue mini-series, the 2004–2005 Gambit series and the 2018 Mr. & Mrs. X series.

== Fictional character biography ==
Young street-thief Remy LeBeau met Bella Donna Boudreaux when they were children, and the pair soon became friends. Unbeknownst to them both, they came from rival Guilds (the Thieves Guild and Assassins Guild). As they grew up and the rivalry between the Guilds increased, their fathers arranged for a marriage between the two in the hopes that it would unite the Guilds. Immediately after the wedding, Bella Donna's brother Julien lashed out in jealousy and challenged Remy in a fight to the death. Remy won, killing Julien. As punishment, Remy was exiled from the New Orleans' Thieves Guild.

A few years later, Bella Donna seeks out Gambit to help fend off the Brood, who are attacking the Guilds. Using her new psychic powers, Bella Donna follows Psylocke into the astral plane and expends her energy, before collapsing in Gambit's arms. Believing Bella Donna dead, Gambit tells the Thieves Guild to take care of her.

Bella Donna survives, but is left comatose. Rogue accidentally touches Bella Donna, causing her to lose her memories. Bella Donna does not remember who she or Gambit are. Bella Donna's memory slowly returns, and she felt as if her soul had been violated. In revenge, she has Rogue's boyfriend Cody Robbins kidnapped. Cody is killed in the ensuing fight between Rogue and Candra.

Gambit returns to New Orleans, ignorant to the multiple hits put up against him in the meantime. Bella Donna had taken one of the contracts, though she had no intention of killing him. Instead, she arranges it so that she could meet with him and sort out the conflicting emotions she had about him. After Gambit is elected viceroy of the Unified Guilds of New Orleans, he transfers his position to Bella Donna and returns to the X-Men.

Bella Donna intends to unite the Thieves and Assassins Guilds in wake of Nate Grey's devastation of the X-Men and the mutant population. Candra later offers Bella Donna and Gambit a choice between her and Rogue as a sacrifice in exchange for power or exile. Gambit opts to free Rogue while working out a new deal between his clan and their enemies.

== Powers and abilities ==
Bella Donna possesses astral projection and plasma blast abilities.

== In other media ==
=== Television ===
- Bella Donna appears in the X-Men: The Animated Series episode "X-Ternally Yours", voiced by Susan Roman.
  - Bella Donna appears in X-Men '97.

=== Film ===
Bella Donna was slated to appear in the 20th Century Fox film Gambit. Initial reports indicated that Lizzy Caplan was in consideration for the role. In 2017, an audition tape surfaced from website Omega Underground, where Ali Rodney auditioned for what appeared to be the role of Bella Donna. In 2022, it was revealed that Léa Seydoux was to be cast as Bella Donna. In 2024, it was reported that Rebecca Furgeson and Abbey Lee were considered before Seydoux. The film, along with other Fox-Marvel productions, was canceled following Disney's acquisition of 21st Century Fox.
