= The American Way (comics) =

American comic book series

- The American Way #1, artist Georges Jeanty.

Publication information
- Publisher: WildStorm: The American Way; Vertigo: The American Way: Those Above and Those Below
- Schedule: Monthly
- Format: Limited series
- Publication date: The American Way: April to September 2006; The American Way: Those Above and Those Below: July to February 2017
- No. of issues: The American Way: 8 The American Way: Those Above and Those Below: 6

Creative team
- Created by: John Ridley; Georges Jeanty
- Written by: John Ridley
- Artist(s): Georges Jeanty
- Inker(s): Karl Story
- Colorist(s): Mayor & Rench of WSFX

The American Way is an American comic book series produced under DC Comics' Wildstorm and Vertigo imprints. The series is an alternate history retelling of the 1960s and 1970s, featuring a team of government-sponsored heroes named the Civil Defense Corps. Much of the series revolves around the introduction of an African American superhero to the team and the responses of the team, government, and public. The series debuted with an eight-issue limited series published by WildStorm and was written by John Ridley with art from Georges Jeanty. The original series ran for eight issues, from April to September 2006. A follow-up series to the original, The American Way: Those Above and Those Below ran six issues, from July to February 2017 with Ridley and Jeanty returning as the creative team.

== Publication history ==
In an interview with National Public Radio, John Ridley stated that the inspiration for this story came from President Lyndon Johnson's wish to include an African-American in the Mercury Space Program. In addition, Ridley noted that he had deliberately employed many different forms of superhero archetypes in order to make the comic more approachable to readers, as well as saying that the U.S. Army's rescuing of Jessica Lynch and the subsequent media narrative, as well as the unraveling of said narrative, inspired the propaganda element of the story.

== Plot ==
=== The American Way ===
The first issue introduces the Civil Defense Corps, a team of superheroes, and their handlers the FDAA (Federal Disaster Assistance Administration). The FDAA stages showdowns between "superheroes" and "supervillains", who are in reality little more than superpowered actors that front for the public. The FDAA is put on the spot when Old Glory, a hero representing the epitome of American ideals, dies of a heart attack during a staged superhero battle.

The New American is introduced in the next issue. Offered as Old Glory's replacement, the New American is secretly an African American man named Jason Fisher. Jason was selected by the FDAA to undergo gene therapy treatments that gave him superstrength and invulnerability, but with a built in weakness: Jason had the pain receptors of a normal human, so that if he was subjected to enough pain he would die even if his skin remained unbroken. The New American is outfitted in a helmet and a pseudo Astronaut's uniform, because 1962 America was depicted in the series as not ready for a minority superhero.

The New American is accidentally "unmasked" at the end of the third issue, while battling a crazed Wanderer.

In the fourth issue the FDAA unleash Hellbent, a homicidal and sociopathic supervillain, to draw attention away from the racial strife caused by the New American's unmasking. The team is split in half along racial views with the southern heroes leaving in disgust, forming the Southern Defense Corps. Most of the rest go to confront Hellbent, who has slaughtered a busload of people on their way to a civil rights rally. They fail miserably, with CDC members Freya being decapitated, Pharos wounded, and The Secret Agent losing a hand. The New American's brother was among the wounded survivors.

The fifth issue shows that Jason's brother was the sole survivor of Hellbent's slaughter but was tortured and left paralyzed. Members continue to debate recent events. The New American escapes to seek revenge on Hellbent after battling his teammates, thus defying the order not to cross the Mason-Dixon line. After this is found out by the SDC they go on to try to track him down. The New American eventually tracks down Hellbent in a secluded cabin in the forest. After a heated battle, Hellbent asks New American to "join him" and kill him. To goad him further, Hellbent reveals that he had raped his brother. This leads Jason to kill him in anger.

In the following issues, the SDC—enraged over him killing "a white" (Hellbent)-hunt Jason until he becomes too exhausted to run. They then attempt to kill him in the street, but are stopped and fought by the CDC. Finally, Wesley "Wes" Chatham, a CDC handler and the main character, is convinced he must trick the CDC/SDC into stranding themselves in a remote area and killing them with nuclear missiles. This plan, however, was designed by Chet, another CDC handler, who reveals himself to be a Hellbent disciple. Since Chet "gets off on killing", he's redirected three of the missiles toward major USA cities. Wes and the East Coast Intellectual realize this in the nick of time and help thwart the plan. The heroes, brought to a truce by Jason, stop most of the missiles.

== Reception ==
=== The American Way ===
A review in The Washington Post described it as a "sly, pointed allegory for U.S. politics in the 1960s".

== Film adaptation ==
In April 2018, series creator John Ridley was attached to write and direct a film adaptation of Those Above and Those Below, and was to be produced by Jason Blum through his Blumhouse Productions company.

== Collected editions ==
The series has been collected into two trade paperbacks:

- The American Way (192 pages, February 2007, ISBN 1-4012-1256-5)
- The American Way: Those Above and Those Below (144 pages, April 2018, ISBN 1401278353)
