= Danilo Beyruth =

Brazilian comics artist

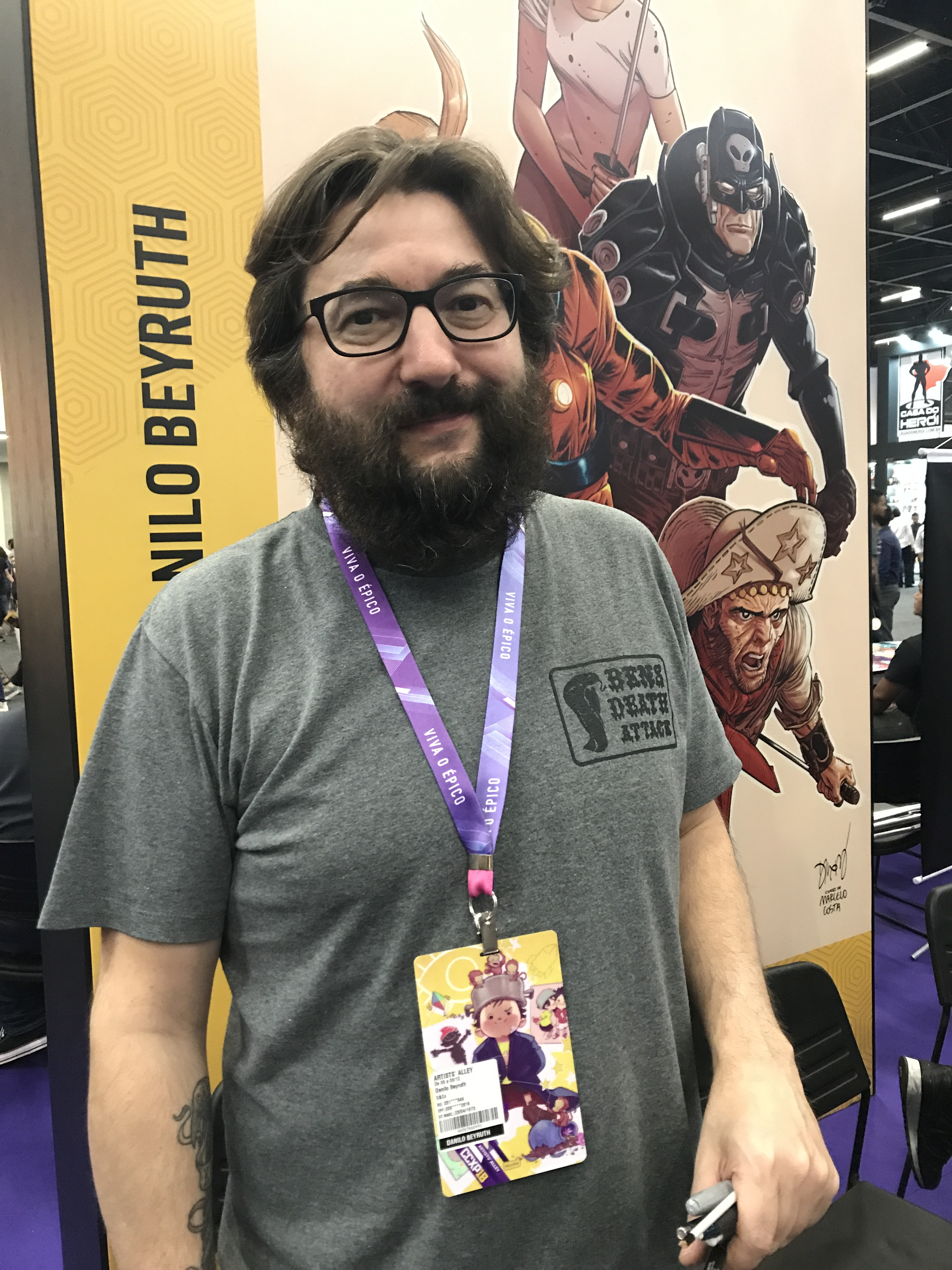
Danilo Beyruth in Comic Con Experience 2018

Danilo Beyruth (born 1973) is a Brazilian comics artist.

== Life and career ==
Beyruth was born in São Paulo. He got a degree in industrial design, and started his career doing advertising illustrations. In 2006, he did classes on perspective and comics narrative at Quanta Academia de Artes, an art school in São Paulo, and by the Kubert School correspondence course. In the following year, he published his first comic book, Necronauta, initially, as a fanzine, and later as a mobile phone comic distributed by the phone carrier Oi, and then as two trade paperbacks published in 2010–11 in Brazil.

In 2010, Beyruth pledged and got funding of the São Paulo State's Secretary of Culture program ProAC - Programa de Ação Cultural, to publish a graphic novel. He published Bando de dois, a story of two cangaceiros, the only survivors of their outlaw band.

In 2012, Beyruth published Astronauta – Magnetar, a graphic novel based on the character created by Mauricio de Sousa, under the label Graphic MSP. Beyruth would draw another five Astronauta books: Astronauta – Singularidade (2014), Astronauta – Assimetria (2016), Astronauta - Entropia (2018), Astronauta: Parallax (2020) and Astronauta: Convergência (2022). He also drew the graphic novel São Jorge based in Saint George for Panini Comics.

Beyruth participated of the Stephen Lindsay's 2007 series Jesus Hates Zombies and of Image Comics' anthology Popgun #3 (2009) with a Necronauta (Deathnaut) story. In 2015 he worked on Marvel NOW!'s Ghost Rider, drawing issues #1 to #4. He also pencilled the titles Deadpool v. Gambit (2016) and The Unbelievable Gwenpool (2016).

He created the concept art for the film Motorrad by Vincente Amorim, released in 2017 Toronto International Film Festival.

In 2023 Beyruth served as the artist on Dan Didio's comic series Ancient Enemies, published by Frank Miller Presents.
