= Gambit (Marvel Comics) =

Comic book character

- Various incarnations of Gambit, as depicted in Gambit vol. 6 #5 (November 2022). Art by Russell Dauterman and Matthew Wilson.

Publication information
- Publisher: Marvel Comics
- First appearance: Published: The Uncanny X-Men Annual #14 (July 1990); In-story: The Uncanny X-Men #266 (August 1990)
- Created by: Chris Claremont (writer); Jim Lee (artist)

In-story information
- Alter ego: Remy Etienne LeBeau
- Species: Human mutant
- Place of origin: New Orleans, Louisiana, United States
- Team affiliations: X-Men; X-Factor; Excalibur; Marauders; Horsemen of Apocalypse; XSE; Thieves Guild
- Partnerships: Rogue
- Notable aliases: Le Diable Blanc; Ragin' Cajun; Robert Lord; Death
- Abilities: Kinetic energy generation and manipulation; Superhuman physical attributes via kinetic energy channeling; Highly skilled martial artist and hand-to-hand combatant; Expert marksman, stick fighter, and acrobat; Telepathic resistance via charged potential energy; Hypnotic charm; Self-charging; Skilled thief

Gambit (Remy LeBeau) is a superhero appearing in American comic books published by Marvel Comics, usually those featuring the X-Men, a group of which Gambit is typically depicted as a member. The character was created by writer Chris Claremont and artist Jim Lee. Drawn by artist Mike Collins, Gambit made his first appearances in The Uncanny X-Men Annual #14 (July 1990) and The Uncanny X-Men #266 (August 1990). Belonging to a subspecies of humans called mutants, Gambit can mentally create, control, and manipulate pure kinetic energy. He is also knowledgeable and skilled in card throwing, hand-to-hand combat, and the use of a fighting staff. Gambit is known to charge playing cards and other objects with kinetic energy, using them as explosive projectiles.

Gambit is Cajun and is originally from New Orleans. He was previously part of the Thieves' Guild before becoming a member of the X-Men. Given his history, few X-Men trusted Gambit when he joined the group. There was consistently a source of stress between him and his on-again, off-again love interest and eventual wife Rogue. This was exacerbated when Gambit's connections to villain Mister Sinister were revealed, although some of his team members accept that Gambit honestly seeks redemption. His solo series of the same name consist of X-Men: Gambit, Astonishing X-Men: Gambit, Gambit: King of Thieves, and Gambit: Thick as Thieves, while his team series consist of Gambit & Bishop, Wolverine/Gambit, Deadpool v. Gambit, Rogue & Gambit, and Mr. & Mrs. X.

The character was most popular during the 1990s. He was adapted into various media throughout the years, including X-Men: The Animated Series (1992–1997), voiced by Chris Potter and Tony Daniels for its last season. The character later appears in the revival X-Men '97 (2024–present), voiced by A.J. LoCascio. The character also appeared in live-action films, first debuting in the 2009 film X-Men Origins: Wolverine, portrayed by Taylor Kitsch. Channing Tatum was attached to star in a solo film, which remained in development hell for five years and was cancelled upon the acquisition of 21st Century Fox by Disney; Tatum eventually portrayed the character in the Marvel Cinematic Universe (MCU) film Deadpool & Wolverine (2024) and is set to reprise the role in Avengers: Doomsday (2026).

== Publication history ==
=== 1990s ===
Writer Chris Claremont and artist Jim Lee created Gambit. The character was introduced in-story in The Uncanny X-Men #266 (Aug. 1990), which was written by Chris Claremont and drawn by Mike Collins. In the initial story, he is a companion to Storm, who has been de-aged to childhood.

His next in-story appearance was intended to be in The Uncanny X-Men Annual #14 (July 1990), but that book was published three weeks early by mistake, before issue #266 was published. Because the story in the annual is set after the story in #266, there is some debate about which issue is the "true" first appearance of the character. Gambit joined the X-Men and appeared in Uncanny X-Men over the next year.

Beginning with X-Men #1 in 1991, Gambit was part of the X-Men's Blue Team, along with Cyclops, Wolverine, Beast, Rogue, Psylocke, and Jubilee. In X-Men vol. 2 #4 (January 1992), Gambit begins to romantically pursue his teammate Rogue. In vol. 2 #8 (May 1992), Bishop claims that he has foreknowledge that Gambit will eventually betray the X-Men, but Bishop is eventually proven wrong. The same issue introduces Bella Donna, Gambit's wife, and elaborates a backstory for Gambit involving a rivalry between the Thieves Guild and the Assassins Guild.

Gambit starred or co-starred in three mini-series during the 1990s. Gambit volume one (1993) and Gambit volume two (1997) explored the character's mysterious past and his ties to the New Orleans Thieves' Guild. Both were written by Ghost Rider writer Howard Mackie, and followed up on characters and plot threads introduced in a 1992 crossover in Ghost Rider #26-27 and X-Men #8-9. A sequel to volume one, Rogue (1994), also prominently featured Gambit. Wolverine/Gambit: Victims (1995) teamed Wolverine and Gambit on a mystery involving what appears to be a modern-day Jack the Ripper. Additionally, Gambit & the X-Ternals, published in 1995, featured a group of renegade mutants led by Gambit who had been living on the edge of law during the "Age of Apocalypse" storyline.

In Uncanny X-Men #350 (December 1997) it is revealed that Gambit was complicit in the Mutant Massacre perpetrated by Mister Sinister; the X-Men expel him from the team. Subsequently, he starred in an ongoing series, X-Men: Gambit, which lasted 25 issues and two annuals, running from December 1998 to February 2001.

=== 2000s and 2010s ===
When Storm created a splinter group to hunt for Destiny's diaries in the pages of X-Treme X-Men, Gambit joined her in issue #5 (November 2001) and co-starred for the remainder of the series. Gambit & Bishop: Sons of the Atom (2001) was advertised as a sequel to the character's first miniseries and involves the two X-Men in Stryfe's return. Gambit starred in a second ongoing series, Astonishing X-Men: Gambit, lasting 12 issues and running from November 2004 to August 2005. In the X-Men: Messiah Complex storyline (2007-2008), Gambit works together with Mystique to recover a mutant baby that Cable has abducted. In 2009, Gambit's past was explored in the one-shot X-Men Origins: Gambit.

In 2010, the one-shot Curse of the Mutants: Storm & Gambit was released; it received a positive review from James Hunt of Comic Book Resources. In June 2011, he began co-starring in X-Men: Legacy.

Marvel Comics announced at the C2E2 convention in August 2012 that Gambit would get a third solo series, Gambit: King of Thieves, that would take him back to his roots as a charismatic, cool, mutant master thief, written by James Asmus and drawn by Clay Mann. When asked about the upcoming series, Asmus said, "This book focuses on the two most important aspects of Gambit: #1 that he's sexy, and #2 that he's the preeminent bad-ass thief of the Marvel Universe." Marvel canceled the series at issue #17, in September 2013.

Gambit was one of the principal characters in the 2013 series All-New X-Factor written by Peter David and drawn by Carmine Di Giandomenico. The series was cancelled after issue #20, with David suggesting it would be some time before Marvel would consider featuring Gambit in a leading role again due to a persistently low sales record in this and previous titles.

Gambit married Rogue in X-Men Gold vol. 2 #30 (August 2018). Gambit co-starred in his own comic with his wife, titled Rogue and Gambit, which was released in 2018. Its reception was mixed, with some praising its reintroduction of the couple's dynamic, while others felt it struggled to balance action with relationship development. Later the same year the same duo appeared in Mr. & Mrs. X, which received generally favorable reviews, highlighting its celebration of the couple's romance and entertaining storytelling.

== Fictional character biography ==
=== Early life ===
Remy Étienne LeBeau was born in New Orleans, Louisiana. He was kidnapped from the hospital where he was born, then raised by the LeBeau Clan Thieves Guild led by Jean-Luc LeBeau and given to the Antiquary as a tribute.

Remy was referred to as "Le Diable Blanc" (French for "the White Devil") due to his combination of Caucasian ethnicity and devilish black and red eyes. He was prophesied to unite the warring Thieves Guild and Assassins Guild. Soon after, Remy was placed in the care of Fagan's Mob, a gang of street thieves who raised him and taught him the ways of thievery. After living as an orphan on the streets, a 10-year-old Remy attempted to steal from Jean-Luc LeBeau, patriarch of the Thieves' Guild, who subsequently adopted him.

Remy's bio-kinetic charging abilities manifested early in his teens, although he kept them secret from his family and friends. When he was 15, he accompanied his cousin Étienne Marceaux on his "Tithing", the ritual initiation test of the Thieves' Guild. However, it went awry as they were assigned to steal from the powerful immortal mutant Candra, who quickly captured them. Candra sold them to the deformed mutant gangster and child slave trader known as the Pig, who planned to sell them and others their age to Hydra to work as soldiers. Remy used his powers to escape their holding pen, but Pig quickly caught up to them. Remy discovered his signature attack when he picked up a playing card that Étienne had dropped, charged it, and threw it in the Pig's face, taking out his eye. Finally escaping his clifftop headquarters by diving into the sea, Remy was ultimately rescued by the Guild, while Étienne drowned.

During his teen years, Remy was first hired by Mister Sinister, then in the disguise of Dr. Nathaniel Essex. Essex wanted his stolen diaries back from the Weapon X program. Remy and the Thieves' Guild accepted the mission and sent out Remy to retrieve said diaries. Standing in the cold, scouting the Weapon X facility, Remy could not bear the cold and swore he would steal a long, stylish jacket in New Orleans after the mission, which he did. Upon entering the facility, Remy witnessed Wolverine escaping from his adamantium procedure and found the diaries. However, deeming them to be too dangerous for Essex to have, as Remy did not fully trust him, Remy burned the diaries. He headed back home, only to find a disappointed Thieves' Guild and Essex.

In an attempt to reconcile the Thieves' and Assassins' Guilds, Remy married Bella Donna Boudreaux, granddaughter of the head Assassin, whom he met at the age of eight. Unfortunately, Bella Donna's brother Julien challenged Gambit to a duel after the wedding. In the duel, Gambit killed Julien, and he was exiled from the city, ending his relationship with Bella Donna.

=== The Mutant Massacre ===
After his exile from New Orleans, he wandered the world and became a master professional thief, making many contacts (and quite a few enemies). During this period, Gambit found he had an uncontrollable amount of energy flowing through him, to the point that he could not withstand it. Desperate, Gambit went to Mister Sinister for help. Sinister modified Gambit's power by removing a portion of Gambit's brain stem, making him significantly less powerful, but able to control his powers. Years later, a much younger version of Mister Sinister surgically returned it, upon Gambit's request, when Gambit time-traveled to the 19th century.

However, Sinister wanted the favor returned, so Gambit carried out various missions for him. For the last of these operations, Gambit gathered together a group of mercenaries which Sinister named the Marauders. Unbeknownst to Gambit, the Marauders intend to massacre the Morlocks, a group of mutant outcasts. Gambit is unable to stop the massacre, but saves a single child named Sarah, who would grow up to be Marrow, the leader of the mutant terrorist group Gene Nation. Gambit long kept his involvement with Mister Sinister and his mission in the massacre secret from the X-Men.

=== X-Men ===
After wandering around the world, Gambit encounters a de-aged and powerless Storm and helps her escape from the Shadow King. The young amnesiac Storm, who had reverted to thievery, joins Gambit, and eventually brings him to the X-Men. When the X-Men are divided into two squads, Gambit joins the Blue team under Cyclops's leadership.

Gambit becomes romantically interested in one of his teammates, Rogue, and begins flirting with her. Despite her off-putting manner and the obstacle of her uncontrollable life-draining abilities, Gambit begins romancing and seducing Rogue, which deveops into a mutual relationship. Their strong romantic relationship was originally written as a one-time, flirtatious moment, but bceame one of the longest and most popular romantic relationships in the X-Men series, probably only second to Jean Grey and Cyclops.

Gambit is captured and brought before a mock trial held by Magneto, leading Rogue to learn of his past with the Marauders. Haunted by Rogue's betrayal of him, Gambit returns to Magneto's citadel, where he encounters the psionic essence of a dead mutant named Mary Purcell. The wraith-like Purcell bonds with Gambit, allowing him to survive until he reaches the Savage Land, a hidden jungle in Antarctica. There, Remy forms a deal with an enigmatic being known as the New Son to return to the United States in exchange for running errands for him.

The New Son reveals his true identity as an alternate universe version of Gambit after organizing an assassination game for a cadre of superpowered mercenaries with Gambit as the target. During the final confrontation, Gambit burns out his enhanced abilities that had been blocked by Sinister, thus returning to his original level of power.

=== Bishop's future ===
In Bishop's future timeline, Bishop stumbles upon a video from the past with Jean Grey making a frantic call to any X-Men she can find. She says that the X-Men have been betrayed by "one of their own" and it appears in the video that she is the last one left and is killed in the video. Disturbed by this, Bishop seeks "The Witness", a man who is said to be the last person who has ever seen the X-Men of the past alive.

When Bishop comes to the X-Men in their original timeline, he meets Gambit, believing him to be the Witness and the "Traitor" who killed the X-Men. For some time, Bishop monitors Gambit until it is revealed that Onslaught was the traitor.

=== 2000s ===
==== X-Treme X-Men: XSE ====
When Storm leads a team of X-Men in search of Destiny's diaries, the Books of Truth, Gambit volunteered to join them, but Rogue — afraid that her increasingly uncontrolled powers would bring him harm — flatly refused to allow him along. He returned to thievery instead and was soon after framed by mutant businessman Sebastian Shaw for the death of crime lord Viceroy. With the assistance of Rogue, Storm's team of X-Treme X-Men, and Red Lotus, Gambit was able to clear his name. Soon after, Gambit is captured and his powers used to open a portal intended for an alien invasion of Earth led by the interdimensional warlord Khan.

Vargas uses the invasion as a chance to attempt to kill more of Storm's team, particularly Rogue. Gambit is seriously wounded by Vargas, but Beast's surgical skills and Rogue's pleading with Gambit on the astral plane resulted in both surviving their ordeal. Gambit and Rogue both lose their powers, leading them to leave the X-Men and move to California.

==== Rejoining the team ====
Gambit and Rogue rejoin the X-Men soon after Sage restores their powers. In their first mission back, Gambit is temporarily blinded by one of his energized cards that went off in his face. Rogue tries to console Gambit during his recovery, but their relationship becomes strained once more as Gambit becomes frustrated with his blindness and their lack of touch after Rogue's powers returned. While he lost his vision, Gambit developed the ability to read his playing cards as if they were tarot cards, giving him a form of precognition. Some time later, Sage jumpstarts Gambit's powers once more, restoring his vision.

==== Horseman of Apocalypse ====
Gambit as the Horseman of Death. Art by Salvador Larroca.

Upon the return of Apocalypse, Gambit submits himself to the villain and was transformed into Apocalypse's Horsemen Death. Gambit intended to infiltrate himself into Apocalypse's ranks to protect the X-Men from the Dark Lord's eventual betrayal, but he miscalculated, as the transformation process warped his mind and body. After becoming Death, Gambit's hair turned white and his skin black. Despite having his mind and body twisted, Gambit retained a large portion of his original personality. Gambit and Sunfire return to the Xavier Institute to claim Polaris. Gambit, in an attempt to free all ties with his old self, attempts to kill Rogue, but is stopped by Pulse. After the X-Men defeat Apocalypse, Sunfire leaves with Gambit to help him clear Apocalypse's brainwashing.

==== Marauders ====
Gambit returns to his original appearance and powers and reemerges as a member of the Marauders. During the 2007–2008 "Messiah Complex" storyline, Gambit is personally targeted by Wolverine during the X-Men's assault on Mister Sinister's Antarctic base. After being tortured by Wolverine, Gambit reveals that Cable has the baby Mutant Messiah before Sinister manages to regain the advantage and drive the X-Men off. As Bishop attempts to kill the baby, Gambit and several of the Marauders quickly stop him, capturing the Messiah.

Mystique touches the baby's face to Rogue's in the hope of sacrificing the child to save her. After an energy burst, Gambit snatches the baby, saying that Rogue would never want an innocent life used to save hers. However, the child is unharmed by Rogue's touch. Gambit gives the baby to Xavier and says he wishes to stay with Rogue. Shortly after, Rogue awakens and tries to kill Mystique. However, somehow the baby cures her of her intensified powers, as well as any psyches she had ever absorbed; this leaves her with the psyche of only one other individual: Mystique. She tells Gambit she needs time alone, and if he still cares for her, he would not follow.

==== "Divided We Stand" ====
In the 2008 "Divided We Stand" storyline, Gambit learns that the Assassins Guild of New Orleans has been approached to kill Charles Xavier and went to track Xavier down and save him from possible danger. He manages to head off Xavier's attackers, defeating them in short order before he is joined by Xavier himself. They determine who the Assassins were supposed to kill next from a list Gambit pulls from one of the goons, which includes Juggernaut, Sebastian Shaw, and Carter Ryking (Hazard). Xavier makes the connection between himself, Ryking, and Juggernaut, but is at a loss with Shaw. They go to see Ryking, who is being held in a mental institution, only to find out that he had died of a brain hemorrhage the night before.

Gambit and Xavier drive out to the Nuclear Research Facility at Alamogordo, where the fathers of Xavier, Juggernaut, and Ryking all worked at some point in their lives, and is most likely where Mister Sinister was running his genetic operations on the X-gene. However, Xavier begins to suffer terrible headaches. He and Gambit decide to wait it out in the desert for a few hours, where they are attacked by the Assassins Guild.

Charles Xavier is abducted and taken to the Almagordo facility, where it is revealed that the employer of the assassins is Amanda Mueller, the head of the Black Womb Project, a former lover and protégée of Mister Sinister. She plans to use Charles to activate Sinister's Cronus machine, to be able to revive herself with Essex's own superpowered essence. Meanwhile, Gambit manages to defeat the rest of the assassins with the assistance of Shaw, and they form a temporary alliance of convenience to destroy the Cronus machine and rescue Xavier. Gambit charges Shaw with biokinetic energy, giving him enough power to destroy the machine.

Gambit begins searching Australia for Rogue and is again in the company of Professor Xavier. Gambit, however, is unsure of this venture, mainly because of Rogue's request that she be left alone. He and Xavier both agreed that if Rogue did not wish for their help or presence, they would do as she wished and leave her be.

When Gambit and Xavier make it over the plains, they find a completely mismatched landscape. Fearing it is Rogue's doing, they go in and find various parts of Rogue's past being projected around them, including her fight against Nimrod and being captured and beaten at Genosha. Gambit finds it hard to control his emotions seeing Rogue in so much pain, but Xavier reminds him that none of it is real. While in the Genoshan prison cells, Gambit and Xavier find the Shi'ar parts hunters and they are told what is happening. They discover that Danger is the one causing the projections and is using Rogue's input from Danger Room sessions. Xavier decides it is better to find Danger first, concluding that Danger is trying to push Rogue to some sort of realization.

Eventually, Xavier, Gambit, and a group of Shi'ar pirates manage to shut down Danger. However, the Professor reactivates her and she defeats the pirates in turn when they attack Gambit and Xavier. After this, it is revealed that Rogue's powers never truly developed past their initial "nascent" stage, which was the reason why her powers never functioned properly. The Professor, now aware of this fact, uses his telepathy to tear down the mental walls that kept Rogue's powers from developing as well as removing the mental echo of Mystique. Rogue kisses Gambit, with no ill side effects, revealing that she is in control of her absorption power.

=== Utopia ===
Following a battle between the X-Men and the Dark Avengers, Cyclops orders Gambit to destroy the Omega Machine chair that Norman Osborn had built to neutralize mutant powers. Gambit makes his way into the H.A.M.M.E.R. headquarters. There, he fights H.A.M.M.E.R.'s mutate guards Hijack and Input. Hijack is easily defeated, however, Input is another story. The input uses his telepathic abilities to enter Gambit's head and discovers there are still leftovers from Gambit's "Death" persona. Death re-emerges and defeats Input, and absorbs him into a playing card, which turns black upon doing so. Gambit then completes his mission, destroys the chair, and returns to the X-Men. When he returns to Utopia, Gambit briefly transforms back into his Death persona.

=== 2010s ===
In the 2010 "X-Men: Second Coming" storyline, Gambit, along with Dazzler, Anole, Northstar, Cannonball, Pixie and Trance travel to Limbo to rescue Magik. Things go wrong when the ground starts to tremble and an army of monstrous demons attack the team. Dazzler calls upon Gambit for help during the attack, but Gambit sinks into the darkness, claiming "Remy's not home right now" leading the X-Men to be overwhelmed by the demons and Gambit transforming into his Death persona. Gambit is stabbed by Magik and Pixie with their magical swords, allowing him to regain control.

In the 2010–2011 "Curse of the Mutants" storyline in the X-Men vol. 3, Gambit and Storm were called upon to help steal the decapitated body of Dracula for the X-Men to resurrect Dracula in their fight against his son, Xarus. He continues to appear as a member of the team as a regular of the series, and also co-stars with X-23 in her self-titled series. He saves her from a burning building after she has been sent away following the events of Second Coming. She decides to pursue a quest to further discover her past when Gambit decides to follow along to keep an eye on her. Gambit and X-23 part ways, as Gambit decides to stay at the newly built Jean Grey School for Higher Learning, while X-23 travels to the Avengers Academy.

In 2012, writer James Asmus had intended to reimagine the character as bisexual, but "word came down we would not be redefining the character as such".

After the events of the Age of X, Gambit chooses not to wipe his memory. He admits the extent of his feelings to Rogue and tells her that he cannot tolerate her indecisiveness. He decides that they should be apart until she is willing to be with him for good. Gambit later joins the team of Legion, Rogue, Magneto, Frenzy, and Xavier, in search of Legion's lost personalities that would not cooperate with him after his troubles in the Age of X. Later on in the series, Gambit, Frenzy and Rogue travel to the Jean Grey High School of Higher Learning to become teachers and mentors of the school.

Gambit joins the newest incarnation of X-Factor. This version is a corporate superhero team sponsored by Serval Industries, which partners him with Polaris and Quicksilver.

Kitty Pryde sends Gambit and Rogue on an undercover mission to the island Paraiso. Their mission, as an estranged couple requiring relationship therapy, was to investigate the disappearance of mutants. This results not only in them confronting their past, emotions, and relationship challenges but also in finding that their memories and powers (as well as those of the missing mutants) are drained into their clones by a mutant called Lavish. Although they are severely weak, they fight against Lavish and the clones, restoring their memories and powers. The couple later decides to learn from their past mistakes and reunite. A conversation with Storm and Nightcrawler spurs Gambit into proposing to Rogue.

=== 2020s ===
Following the fall of Krakoa, Gambit and Rogue move to Louisiana, where they begin training a new group of mutants called the Outliers. After defeating the dragon Sadurang, Gambit obtains one of the Eyes of Agamotto, which gradually corrupts his mind. Eventually, the Eye's corruption causes him to transform into a dragon-like form called Wyvern. Gambit receives an exorcism from the mutant Repent, curing him of the Eye's influence.

== Characterization ==
Gambit first appeared in Uncanny X-Men #266 in 1990 and quickly became a fan favorite during the X-Men's rise in the 1990s. He was characterized as an edgy, gruff ladies' man with a mysterious past, drawing comparisons to Wolverine, a factor that was noted to have contributed to his appeal. His flirtatious, enigmatic nature, along with his smoking habit, reinforced his rebellious image, aligning him with the "bad boy" archetype that was prevalent during the era. Like many characters from the 90s, Gambit was brash and often broke the rules, reminiscent of Wolverine, who was a mouthy loner that resonated with readers. While Wolverine was serious and tough, Gambit was presented as charming and unpredictable, adding a dynamic flair to the team. His cocky, self-assured attitude often led him to drift away from the X-Men, returning to his life as a thief and con man. However, he would inevitably come back to the team.

Entertainment Weekly noted that Gambit is a symbolized "90s cool," with his trench coat, Cajun slang, and "goofy powers" like "hypnotic charm." However, they argue that Gambit stands out because he is not dark or gritty—he is fun and playful. His explosive playing cards fit his "Sly Wink" personality, and EW suggests a Gambit movie should be like Rounders with explosions. In the early 2000s, Marvel's new editor-in-chief, Joe Quesada, mandated that all characters quit smoking. This affected Gambit, as smoking was part of his rebellious image. His character then evolved from a reckless rogue to a more responsible team player.

=== Powers and abilities ===
Gambit is a mutant with the ability to convert the potential energy stored in an inanimate object into pure light kinetic energy, thus "charging" that item with highly explosive results. He prefers to charge smaller objects, such as his ever-present playing cards, as the time required to charge them is greatly reduced and they are much easier for him to throw. The only real limitation to this ability is time: the larger it is, the longer it takes to charge. Most charging takes place through direct skin contact. The power of his explosions is dependent on the mass of the object he is charging: for example, a charged playing card explodes with the force of a grenade. Gambit can also use his mutant abilities to accelerate an object's kinetic energy instead of converting its potential energy; if charged, his Bo staff has been depicted with enough power to level a house.

Gambit's ability to tap into kinetic energy also grants him superhuman physical attributes (speed, reflexes, reactions, agility, flexibility, dexterity, coordination, balance, endurance, as well as enhanced but not superhuman strength), as his body constantly generates bio-kinetic energy and so is constructed for constant motion. This gives him an added edge that he has used to his advantage by developing a unique acrobatic fighting style.

The charged potential energy always in his body grants him a build up of static electricity, which shields his mind from detection and intrusion from the strongest telepaths such as Emma Frost, Jean Grey, and even Charles Xavier. The shield has the added effect of destabilizing touch-based abilities.

Gambit also possesses an unusually strong and irresistible hypnotic charm that allows him to exert a subtle influence over sentient beings, leading them to believe what he says and agree with his suggestions. This characteristic is so powerful that when given the chance, Gambit has even convinced the Shadow King himself. The hypnotic charm does not work on those who are aware and prepared for it.

During combat, Gambit customarily wears a suit of highly articulated light body armor and uses an extendable metal staff. He is extensively trained in martial arts, particularly Savate and the staff style art Bōjutsu. He is an excellent hand-to-hand combatant, applying street-fighting techniques and acrobatics. Gambit is a skilled card-thrower, so he throws his charged playing cards at opponents with great accuracy. He also excels in all aspects of thievery, as he was adopted by the patriarch of a Thieves Guild.

Gambit was temporarily given the full strength and potential of his mutant abilities to battle his counterpart, New Son. At his full strength and power, Gambit can control all aspects of kinetic energy down even to the molecular level, allowing him to manipulate the potency of his bio-kinetic energy to burn, cause molecular discomfort, incinerate, create timed detonations (and manipulate the potency of the energy release), fire energy blasts, defy gravity, heal wounds, charge objects within his line of sight without contact, manipulate the flow of time & space and effectively exist as an energy being. Under such conditions, he holds sufficient power to cause another being to be unable to move—or unable to stop if in motion, by arresting the flow of their kinetic energy. He has been able to cause or simulate various energies by manipulating the kinetic energy present, such as infrared and microwaves, by increasing molecular agitation, or cold by reducing it. He was also able to use his powers to travel through space-time, cross dimensions, and remake realities outside of space-time by transforming himself into living energy which joined with the kinetic flow. Finally, Gambit was able to heal himself by stimulating his cellular activity. These enhanced powers were burnt out after fighting New Son, and Gambit has since returned to his original, somewhat lower power levels.

However, after Sage jump-started his powers again, he was able to heal his blinded eyes. —thus implying he is again able to heal himself—and is also able again to charge living things with energy, as when he teamed up with Sebastian Shaw to destroy Mister Sinister's machines. He was also given another boost when he was killed in an altercation with a drug lord and Faiza Hussain managed to restore him before it set in, enabling him to charge a bullet with twice as much explosive force than usual. He has later proven able to delay his explosions again, although this is difficult for him to accomplish.

After Apocalypse used the Celestial Technology to transform Gambit into the Horseman Death, Gambit demonstrates the ability to convert inert materials into toxic substances (such as transforming breathable air into poisonous gases) and has the potential to ingest diseases and plagues. It is apparent that the Celestial Technology never left his system, as seen during a telepathic attack against him that temporarily brought out the Death persona, which eventually killed the attacker. He also showcased new abilities he had not used before in this form – such as his Death Charge, which fueled his projectiles with dark energies that had the effect of either disintegrating or entrapping beings within his cards. His new transformation also affords him the ability to control the trajectory in which the thrown cards fly in, giving him more control over their vector path while in motion. He could also convert people to his mindset as he did with Northstar, Dazzler and several demons while in limbo. Gambit's body did subsequently return to normal.

== Reception ==
Gambit has long been recognized as one of the most beloved and unique characters in the Marvel Universe. In 2011, IGN ranked him 65th in their "Top 100 Comic Book Heroes" list, they noted that while some might see him as redundant alongside Wolverine, many fans fell in love with Gambit's "swagger, charm, and dark past," with his continued appearances in TV and movie spinoffs solidifying his place as one of the greats. In 2013, ComicsAlliance ranked Gambit 4th in their "50 Sexiest Male Characters in Comics" list, highlighting his charm and fan-favorite status. Similarly, Entertainment Weekly placed him 8th in their 2015 list, "Let's rank every X-Man ever," praising his appeal as a complex and enduring character.

In 2017, Chris Killian of ComicBook.com called Gambit one of the "best X-Men mutants," writing, "It's really hard to have a '10 Best' X-Men mutants list and not include the Ragin' Cajun." He admired Gambit's suave personality, cool trench coat, and his flirtatious relationship with Rogue, despite the dangers of her powers. Killian also commented on Gambit's struggles with solo projects, noting the troubled development of his solo movie starring Channing Tatum, but humorously pointed out, "Is anyone trying to make a solo Strong Guy movie? Didn't think so". That same year, ComicBook.com also ranked Gambit 10th in their "10 Best X-Men" list, reinforcing his lasting importance.

In 2018, CBR ranked Gambit 27th in their "Age of Apocalypse: The 30 Strongest Characters in Marvel's Coolest Alternate World" list. Scoot Allan of CBR further praised Gambit's appeal, remarking that despite debates among collectors about whether his first appearance was in Uncanny X-Men Annual #14 or Uncanny X-Men #266, Gambit quickly became one of the team's most popular members. Allan pointed out how, despite Gambit's ongoing popularity, he hasn't appeared in as many adaptations outside of comics as some of his fellow X-Men.

In 2022, Gambit continued to receive recognition. CBR ranked Gambit and Rogue 7th in their "10 Best Marvel Couples" list, acknowledging their complex and enduring relationship. Kayla Brown of ScreenRant also described Gambit as a fan-favorite character, due to his background as a master thief and his cool, mysterious charm. Brown highlighted how Gambit's ability to turn inanimate objects into explosives, along with his complex personality, made him relatable to fans. His mix of protectiveness, sarcasm, and occasional frustration gave depth to his character. Additionally, ScreenRant ranked him 1st in their "10 Best X-Men Characters Created by Chris Claremont" list, emphasizing his importance within the X-Men universe.

== Other versions ==
=== Age of Apocalypse ===
In the Age of Apocalypse, Gambit is a member of the X-Men and one of Magneto's closest friends. Like his Earth-616 counterpart, Gambit fell in love with Rogue, which prompted him to leave the X-Men when Rogue chose Magneto, whom she could touch due to the two possessing magnetism-based powers (she had permanently absorbed the powers and memories of Polaris just as she had done to Ms. Marvel on Earth-616). Gambit, as a member of the Thieves Guild, maintains a connection with Candra, who was also one of the Horsemen of Apocalypse, until she is killed. Despite having left the X-Men, Gambit still fights for "the Dream" in his own way. He assembles a group of thieves called the "X-Ternals", who steal from Apocalypse's regime and the mutant aristocracy to provide food and medicines to the humans still living in New York.

Gambit is accepted back into the X-Men when they launch a mission to rescue Magneto from Apocalypse's citadel. Following the death of Apocalypse and the fall of his regime, Gambit rejoins the X-Men.

During a battle with the Sinister Six, Gambit, Nightcrawler, and Dazzler are sucked into Cloak's Darkforce. Nightcrawler manages to save Dazzler, but Gambit is presumed dead.

Gambit is later revealed to have survived and escaped from the Darkforce. He is among the team of X-Men who are sent to retrieve a Celestial life seed to prevent Angel from ascending as the new Apocalypse, during which he is killed.

=== Bishop's future ===
In the future timeline that is the home of the X-Man Bishop (Earth-1191), the X-Men were wiped out in 1996 by someone recorded only as 'The X-Traitor'. The Witness, the sole survivor of the attack, has an antagonistic relationship with Bishop. When Bishop comes to the past, he recognizes the Witness as Gambit. The Witness claims to be pantemporal, capable of seeing all things in all realities at all times.

=== Ultimate Marvel ===
The Ultimate Universe's version of Gambit, as introduced in Ultimate X-Men #13 by Chuck Austen, Esad Ribic, and John Livesay, is portrayed as a streetwise hustler from New York City. His initial solo arc involves encountering a young girl whose parents were murdered by mobster Hammerhead while she panhandles on the subway. Determined to protect her from the Maggia, Gambit confronts Hammerhead and Silvermane, where he saves the girl, securing her a safer home before continuing on his own path. Gambit faces the X-Men in a three-issue arc in Ultimate X-Men #50–53, where he works for the Fenris twins, who provide him with a suit to control his explosive powers. Tasked with kidnapping Rogue as a potential recruit for Fenris Corporation, he develops a bond with her and after Wolverine brutally beats him, prompting him to turn against Fenris. Their romance takes a turn in Ultimate X-Men Annual #1 when they attempt to raid a Fenris facility in Las Vegas. Their heist is interrupted by Juggernaut, who has tracked them down due to his infatuation with Rogue. To protect her, Gambit tricks Juggernaut into collapsing a building on them, defeating him but mortally wounding himself. In his final moments, he shares a kiss with Rogue, allowing her to absorb his life force and powers, temporarily enhancing her abilities as she rejoins the X-Men.

== In other media ==
=== Television ===
Gambit as depicted in X-Men: The Animated Series

Gambit has been adapted into several animated television series, first appearing in X-Men: The Animated Series (1992–1997), where he was voiced by Chris Potter for the first four seasons and Tony Daniels in the fifth season. The director Larry Houston initially planned an X-Men team without Gambit with Colossus in the original lineup, but Marvel requested that Colossus be replaced with Gambit. The character later appears as Gambit and Death in the revival X-Men '97 (2024–present), voiced by A. J. LoCascio.

Gambit also appears in Spider-Man: The Animated Series (1994–1998), again voiced by Potter. He made a minor non-speaking appearance in the Fantastic Four (1994–1996) episode "Nightmare in Green". Gambit next appears in X-Men: Evolution (2000–2003) voiced by Alessandro Juliani, and in Wolverine and the X-Men (2009) voiced by Phil LaMarr. Additionally, he appeared in Lego Marvel Avengers: Mission Demolition (2024) voiced by Steve Blum.

=== Films ===
The character was set to appear in 20th Century Fox's X-Men film series (2000–2024). He was originally planned to make a cameo appearance in X2: X-Men United (2003), portrayed by James Bamford, but the scene was ultimately cut.

Gambit was also set to appear in X-Men: The Last Stand (2006), with Channing Tatum auditioning for the role, and Josh Holloway being offered the part but declined due to scheduling conflicts with Lost (2004–2010). Gregory Helms, James Franco, and Keanu Reeves were also considered for the role. Gambit was originally intended to appear as a new student at Xavier's School for Gifted Youngsters and as Iceman's rival for Rogue's affections. However, the character was ultimately cut from the film and appeared only in the novelization. According to the film's audio commentary, Gambit was also intended to appear as a prisoner recruited into Magneto's Brotherhood of Mutants, but this was cut prior to filming.

Gambit as depicted in X-Men Origins: Wolverine (2009), portrayed by Taylor Kitsch (top), and in Deadpool & Wolverine (2024), portrayed by Channing Tatum (bottom).

The character appeared in X-Men Origins: Wolverine (2009), portrayed by Taylor Kitsch. Kitsch reportedly signed a three-picture deal. Holloway was initially considered for the role following screen tests with Hugh Jackman, but his casting was overruled due to an unnamed studio executive's preference for a younger actor. In 2014, Tatum was set to play the character, who would be introduced in X-Men: Apocalypse (2016), followed by an eponymous solo spin-off film, that was scheduled for release on March 13, 2020. On March 14, 2019, following Disney's pending acquisition of Fox, Rupert Wyatt, who was set to direct the film, stated, "Now Disney has the reins, so I don't know what their plans are". By May 2019, the film was officially shelved.

Gambit appears in Deadpool & Wolverine (2024) portrayed by Tatum who was appreciative of star and co-writer Ryan Reynolds's efforts and support towards incorporating Gambit into the film, with the former believing he never would have had the chance to portray Gambit following the solo film's cancellation. Commenting on the possibilities of the Gambit film re-materializing in an Instagram story, Reynolds expressed his interest in working with Tatum for the project, either by reprising his role as Wade Wilson/Deadpool or assisting production. Reynolds also released a deleted scene online featuring Tatum's Gambit having survived the events of the film and teasing the character's potential return. In March 2025, Tatum was announced to be reprising his role as Gambit in Avengers: Doomsday (2026).

=== Video games ===
Gambit has made numerous appearances across a wide variety of video games. His first appearance came in Spider-Man/X-Men: Arcade's Revenge (1992). The character was voiced by Daniels in X-Men vs. Street Fighter (1996), Marvel vs. Capcom: Clash of the Super Heroes (1998), Marvel vs. Capcom 2: New Age of Heroes (2000), X-Men: Mutant Academy 2 (2001), and X-Men: Next Dimension (2002). Gambit was later voiced by Scott MacDonald in X-Men Legends (2004) and X-Men Legends II: Rise of Apocalypse (2005), followed by Chris Edgerly in X-Men Origins: Wolverine (2009) and Michael Dunn in Marvel: Ultimate Alliance 2 (2009), and voiced by LaMarr in both X-Men: Destiny (2011) and Lego Marvel Super Heroes (2013). Rick Pasqualone provided the voice for the character in Marvel Heroes (2013) and Marvel Ultimate Alliance 3: The Black Order (2019). LoCascio voiced Gambit in Marvel Rivals (2024) and Marvel Mystic Mayhem (2025).

Gambit also appeared in other games without voice acting credits, including Lego Marvel Super Heroes (2013), and mobile games like Marvel Puzzle Quest (2013), Marvel: Future Fight (2015), Marvel Contest of Champions (2014). Fortnite (2017), and he remains a key character in card and strategy games like Marvel Super War (2019), Marvel Snap (2022), and Marvel Tōkon: Fighting Souls.

=== Miscellaneous ===
Gambit appeared in the novel X-Men: The Chaos Engine Trilogy. He also appeared in Adi Shankar's Bootleg Universe short film Truth In Journalism (2013), portrayed by JC Tremblay. This version is a French film student directing a documentary on disgraced investigative journalist Eddie Brock's encounters with Bullseye and the Venom symbiote. Gambit also appeared in Wolverine: The Lost Trail (2018–2019), voiced by Bill Heck.

== Bibliography ==
- Brownfield, Troy (2025). X-Men for Dummies. Marvel. ISBN 978-1-394-36274-5.
- Wiacek, Stephen "Win" (2026). X-Men: The Ultimate Guide. DK. ISBN 979-8-2173-0613-8.
