= Gambit (unproduced film) =

Cancelled 20th Century Fox film project

Gambit is an unproduced American superhero film based on the Marvel Comics character of the same name. It was intended to be an installment of the X-Men film series. Before its cancellation, the film had been written by Josh Zetumer based on a story by the character's creator Chris Claremont. Channing Tatum was set to star in the title role.

Tatum was looked at for early attempts to include Gambit in the X-Men films but was not available for that character's film introduction in X-Men Origins: Wolverine (2009). Taylor Kitsch portrayed the character instead. Producer Lauren Shuler Donner expressed interest in a Gambit film starring Tatum in early 2014, and Tatum officially signed on that May. The film had been in development hell since then, with Rupert Wyatt, Doug Liman, and Gore Verbinski attached as director to the film at different times over the years, with Tatum and his producing partner Reid Carolin also lobbying to direct, and the film's release date also pushed back numerous times. Gambit was scheduled for release on March 13, 2020, but development of the film was placed on hold due to the acquisition of 21st Century Fox by Disney. After taking over the film, Disney officially cancelled it in May 2019. Tatum later appeared as the character in Marvel Studios' Deadpool & Wolverine (2024), and will reprise the role in the upcoming Avengers: Doomsday (2026).

== Early development ==
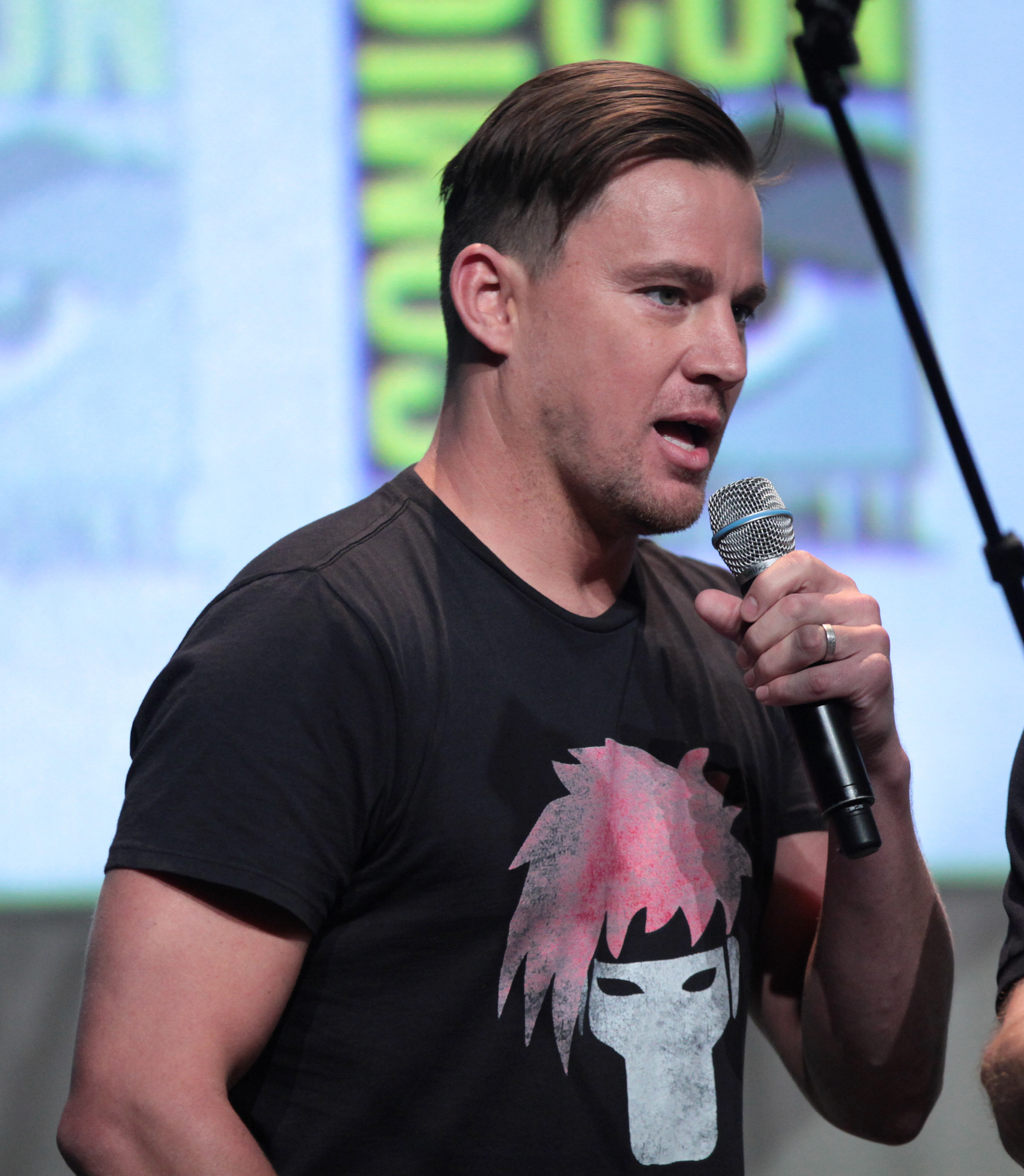
Producer and star Channing Tatum promoting Gambit at the 2015 San Diego Comic-Con

For X2 (2003), director Bryan Singer asked stunt double James Bamford to film a short cameo appearance as the character Gambit. The scene was ultimately cut from the film, and Bamford believed that a better known actor would be cast in the role for any future appearance. Singer wanted the character to have a large part in the sequel, X-Men: The Last Stand (2006), with Keanu Reeves in the role, but ultimately did not return to direct that film. A new writing team of Simon Kinberg and Zak Penn were set to write the sequel's screenplay by 20th Century Fox after Singer's departure, and though the pair wanted to include the character, they felt there was only room for a cameo appearance given the number of new characters more relevant to the film's storylines. They decided to save Gambit for a larger role in a future film. Before that decision was made, Josh Holloway had been looked at for the part but was unavailable due to his filming schedule with the ABC television series Lost (2004–2010). Channing Tatum was then chosen for the role, but the character was written out of the script before he was officially cast.

By October 2007, Gambit was believed to be appearing in the Wolverine spin-off film X-Men Origins: Wolverine, set for release in 2009. Tatum was unable to re-commit to the part at that time because of scheduling conflicts with G.I. Joe: The Rise of Cobra (2009), so Taylor Kitsch was ultimately cast in the role. Kitsch signed a three-picture deal. Fox executive Jeff Katz was confident that the character would be well received, saying, "there is a level of strategy in how we grow these things, and what characters can transition between multiple films", indicating that the character could move on to his own standalone film as was the plan with Ryan Reynolds' Deadpool. However, Wolverine was not well received by critics, and Kitsch's performance did not make him the breakout hit that Fox executives had expected. In September 2013, Tatum expressed interest in taking over the role from Kitsch, saying, "Gambit's my favorite. I'm from New Orleans, around that area. My dad's from New Orleans, and I like to do a Cajun accent. I could do it for real. No knock on Taylor Kitsch, though, 'cause I actually like his Gambit, but I've always lived around Cajun people ... Gambit was always like the woman-loving, cigarette-smoking, drinking [guy]. He was the punk rock of all the superheroes."

X-Men franchise producer Lauren Shuler Donner revealed in January 2014 that she had begun planning a Gambit film with Tatum. She said it "doesn't have to be a great big movie. It's a thief in New Orleans, it's a whole different story. [Tatum]'s on board, and I have to get the studio on board." That May, Tatum officially signed on to star in a Gambit film that was intended to begin a new standalone franchise; he would introduce his version of the character in X-Men: Apocalypse (2016). By October, the producers were discussing the film's story and looking for a writer, with Josh Zetumer hired in the role at the end of the month, working off a story treatment by Gambit's comic creator Chris Claremont. Alongside Donner and Kinberg, Tatum was set to produce the film with Reid Carolin of their company Free Association. In January 2015, Fox gave the film an October 7, 2016, release date. Over several months, Tatum approached Shawn Levy among approximately 40 directors to try and get them to direct. In May 2015, Zetumer completed his first draft of the script, which Tatum described as a "killer" origin story that changed "some of the tropes of these movies".

== Rupert Wyatt ==
In June 2015, Rupert Wyatt signed on to direct the film, with Tatum saying, "We finally found someone that I really do believe wants to make Gambit". Tatum added that the film was "a really unique opportunity" among superhero films, and was no longer set to appear in Apocalypse. He had begun learning to throw cards and sleight-of-hand tricks for the part from magician David Kwong, a friend of Carolin's from College. Filming was set to begin in New Orleans in late October or early November of that year. By the end of July, the film was believed to focus on "mobsters and thieves [rather than] 'end-of-the-world' stakes", but Fox also wanted to "load up on spectacle and make this character as popular as possible" with a large $154 million budget to be mostly spent in Louisiana. Several actresses were being tested for the female lead, including Léa Seydoux.

Tatum was renegotiating his contract with Fox at the end of July 2015, and was believed to be close to dropping out of the project due to Fox's intention to have Tatum become one of the "anchor characters" of the franchise following the impending retirement of Hugh Jackman as the series' former lead character James "Logan" Howlett / Wolverine. This would have been a major commitment for Tatum to make. Backend compensation was also an issue. Within days, the issues had been resolved and Tatum was once again set to star and produce; it was said that his "participation hardly was in any real danger" due to the commitments Tatum had already made to the project. Rebecca Ferguson and Abbey Lee were also testing for the "hotly contested" female lead of Belladonna Boudreaux, but Ferguson soon chose a role in The Girl on the Train (2016) instead. Seydoux was cast in the role by the end of August.

In September, Wyatt left the film after changes to its schedule caused a clash with another project he was committed to. Wyatt was also believed to have become "skittish" about directing the film due to wanting to rewrite the script and "conceive the world that he is filming", leading to differences in opinion on the script with Fox, Tatum, and Kinberg. Tatum said Wyatt left the film because of a "fallout" with the studio. Wyatt later stated in March 2019, that he left the film because the studio "slashed [the budget] quite considerably" following the financial failure of Fantastic Four (2015), but was not willing to let the script be re-written to match the new budget before the beginning of production which then was around 10 weeks away.

== Doug Liman ==
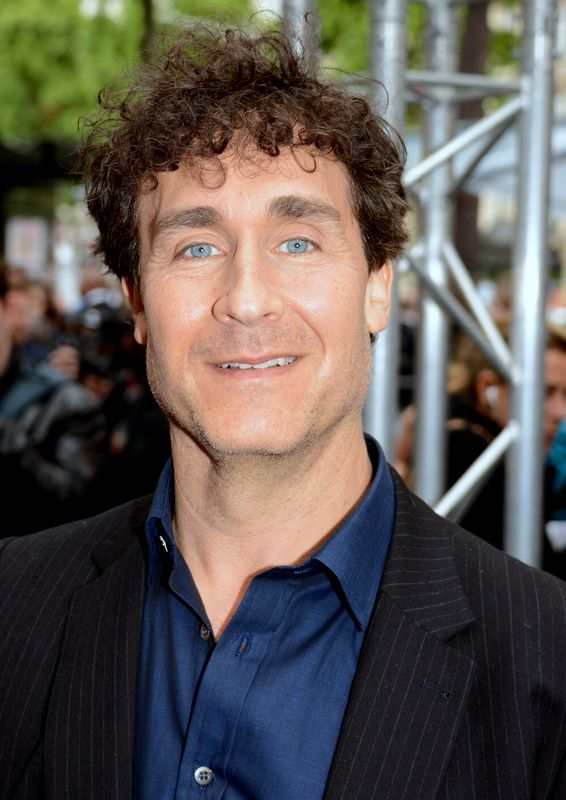
Doug Liman joined the film as director in November 2015, but left in August 2016 due to script concerns

Fox began "furiously" meeting with potential replacements for Wyatt in hopes of keeping the film's release date, including directors Doug Liman, Joe Cornish, Shane Black, and F. Gary Gray. Liman was in final talks to take on the film in November 2015. He had already begun working on the screenplay with Tatum, Carolin, Zetumer, and Kinberg. The latter noted that the X-Men franchise was beginning to branch out into different tones with the irreverent, R-rated Deadpool (2016), and that "Gambit will have its own different flavor and tone to it, will be more like a heist movie and a sexy thriller in a way." In January, filming was set for March 2016.

Fox officially removed Gambit from its October release date in February 2016. Liman soon chose to direct the film The Wall (2017) while waiting for a new draft of the Gambit script, intending to then begin production on Gambit at the end of 2016. Tatum and Carolin were looking for a new writer to undertake the rewrite and pursue a different creative direction for the film, while Liman was expected to discard Wyatt's casting of Seydoux and begin casting from scratch himself. Kinberg explained in May that the group had collectively been unhappy with the film's script, but were now "very close" to completing it. He added that "the most important thing is getting the tone and the voice right ... [we are] hoping that Gambit is like what Deadpool was—the start of a new franchise within the X-Men universe—we want to make sure we get it right."

In July, Kinberg praised the script for Gambit and said that they were now aiming to begin filming at the beginning of 2017. However, Liman left the project the next month in a "mutual split" with Fox, choosing to instead direct the DC Comics-based DC Extended Universe (DCEU) film Dark Universe. Liman later explained that he is "all about the script, and I just wasn't feeling it. I've gotta connect to the script." Tatum attributed part of the reasoning for Liman leaving was because the film had been in development for so long at that point, that he hoped the film could have been moved along with someone else.

== Gore Verbinski ==
In November 2016, Gambit was expected to begin development again with a new director after Tatum completed work on the film Logan Lucky (2017). The next January, Donner confirmed that Tatum was still attached to the project, and a month later Kinberg described the film as being in "active development". He stated his hope for the project to be ready by the end of 2017, for filming to then begin at the start of 2018. He noted that there were already three X-Men franchise films set for release in 2018 at that point, so Gambit "can wait for a moment." Kinberg compared Tatum's commitment to the role of Gambit to the determination shown by Reynolds and Jackman to get their most recent X-Men films (Deadpool and Logan (2017), respectively) made "right", and reiterated Fox's intention to build a new Gambit film franchise.

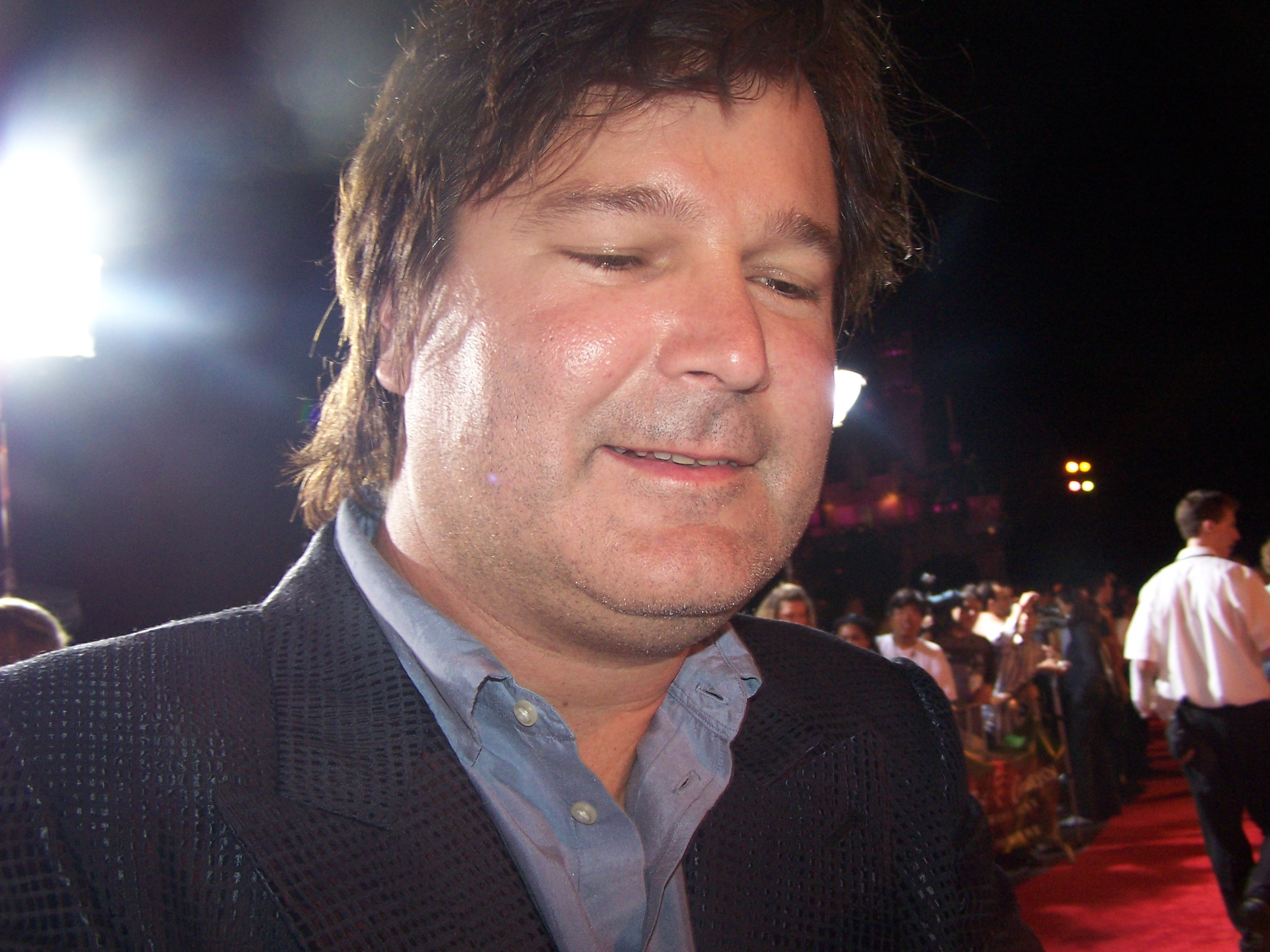
Gore Verbinski joined the film as director in October 2017, but left in January 2018 due to a scheduling conflict and reported creative issues

At the end of May 2017, X-Men producer Hutch Parker was unable to provide an update on the film, but said "there's still a desire and a passionate interest to see [Gambit] made." Tatum reiterated that he was still actively working on the film in July, and discussed the long development period for the film and the many delays to the production, saying,

I think we got super, super lucky. I think a lot of setbacks, we'll look at them in hindsight as giant blessings. Because we were making it, [and] we're writing a movie right at the turn of a paradigm shift in movies. So we got lucky that we didn't just come out with ours, which I don't think was fully formed. It was a good idea. We were going in the right direction. And then we got to learn from two really beautifully different kinds of a complete paradigm shift [in] Logan and Deadpool.

Tatum added the next month that work on the Gambit script had "started over", and that "we're really getting to do some of the things we've always wanted to do with the script" which he described as "something that this genre of movie hasn't seen before." In October, Gore Verbinski was in talks to direct the film, which was described as a "high priority" for Fox. A week later, the film was given a February 14, 2019, release date, and Verbinski was confirmed to direct. By the end of the month, casting for the film was "well underway", and Jenny Beavan was hired as costume designer. The next month, Lizzy Caplan was in talks to join the film as its female lead, and location scouting for the film was taking place in New Orleans. At some point, Lil Rel Howery was attached to star in the film alongside Tatum. By December, filming was set to begin in New Orleans in March 2018. The next month, Verbinski withdrew from the project due to a scheduling conflict, though creative differences were also reported. Tatum said between himself, Fox, and Verbinski, they all were aligned creatively at the start, but as development progressed "we just all grew apart". Fox subsequently moved the release date to June 7, 2019.

== Re-development and cancellation ==
When you have these movies that need a very special and unique tone, it takes a little while to find that tone. Deadpool feels like it exploded out of nowhere, but it was a 10-year development process on that movie.

— Producer Simon Kinberg comparing the long development process for Gambit to that of the successful Deadpool

Despite intending to keep the March filming start following Verbinski's departure, Fox removed the film from its production schedule by the end of January 2018. At that time, the search for Verbinski's replacement was underway, while the new June 2019 release date was expected to play better for the film as a "summer Marvel movie". The film was described as having a comedic tone and revolving around a heist. Fox expected another new draft of the script in March, and still considered the film to be greenlit with a set budget despite the lack of director; a new production start date of June 19, 2018, was set, dependent on a new director being found in time.

The producers met with several directors for the film during April 2018, with Kinberg stating in May that he and Tatum were happy with the current script for the project and hoped to pick a new director in "the next couple of weeks and shoot the movie maybe the end of this summer". He reiterated that the film was still a priority for Fox "believe it or not", and added that the proposed acquisition of 21st Century Fox by Disney did not affect their plans for the film at that point. In September, Fox was believed to be interested in starting production on February 15, 2019. The studio was still looking to shoot the film in New Orleans, and was looking to use Big Easy Studios for production space after doing the same for Logan. This new start date gave the studio time to hire a new crew for the film after previously hired crew members were let go. By the end of the month, Kinberg confirmed that they were now looking to begin production on Gambit in early 2019. He described the film as being "loosely" a romantic comedy due to Fox wanting the tone of each X-Men spin-off to be driven by the protagonist's personality (such as Deadpool's raunchy comedic tone and Logan's western "vibe") and the character of Gambit being "a hustler and a womanizer and we just felt like there was an attitude, a swagger to him, that lent itself to romantic comedy". Tatum later elaborated that this version of the film would have possibly never been made even by Fox due to being an R-rated romantic comedy, making the title character the "kind" of one who could only exist in a movie like Deadpool as the script had mutants having sex. Tatum felt that had Derek Cianfrance, with whom he made Roofman (2025), directed the film, he would have made the film with no special but practical effects. At that time, Fox delayed the release of the film again, pushing it to March 13, 2020. By then, Carolin was believed to have been working with Zetumer on the script.

In October, Kinberg confirmed that the version of the film they were developing was significantly different from their earlier plans, which is why the tone had changed from a heist film to a romantic comedy. He elaborated that some of the heist elements remained in the film due to Gambit still being a thief, but the focus would be a love story between Gambit and Belladonna. Kinberg compared the new direction to Mr. & Mrs. Smith (2005), which he wrote, as well as The Philadelphia Story (1940) and His Girl Friday (1940). At that time, Daniel Woburn of Screen Rant opined that the film, which he described as being in development hell since 2014, was likely to be canceled once The Walt Disney Company's acquisition of Fox was complete since Marvel Studios would want to integrate the X-Men characters into their Marvel Cinematic Universe (MCU).

In January 2019, it was reported that Tatum was interested in directing the film along with starring. Tatum and Carolin would have been co-directors, something the studio was not keen on given both had never directed before. The next month, Donner revealed that Gambit, along with the rest of Fox's Marvel films, was "on hold" until Disney's acquisition of Fox was complete. A week after the acquisition was complete, Kinberg said the film was being evaluated by Marvel. In May 2019, Gambit was officially cancelled by Disney and removed from its release schedule. In May 2020, Kinberg revealed the character Mister Sinister would have featured in the film, after the Essex Corporation was teased in Apocalypse; Mister Sinister had previously been rumored at one point to feature in The New Mutants (2020).

In February 2022, Carolin described the film as "a romantic comedy superhero movie" with an R rating and similar tone to Deadpool. He also revealed that the film had been cast, and was setting up production offices in anticipation of beginning shooting in New Orleans when Disney shelved the project, resulting in Tatum developing a trauma to all Marvel Comics based adaptations. Both Tatum and Carolin were open to returning to the project and character, though not as directors, due to Tatum feeling that decision "doomed" the project. Tatum recalled in November 2026 that it was "frustration and hubris" between he and Carolin believing they would have been able to direct the film, noting that they had "fell in love" with the script but conceded neither of them were "ready" to direct a large-scale superhero film as their first films.

== Marvel Cinematic Universe ==
Tatum as Gambit in Deadpool & Wolverine

Tatum appeared as the character in the Marvel Studios MCU film Deadpool & Wolverine (2024), wearing a comic-accurate costume and using Gambit's "indecipherable" Cajun accent. His lines and interactions with the other characters referenced the unsuccessful efforts to get the Gambit film made. Tatum was appreciative of star and co-writer Ryan Reynolds' efforts and support to incorporate the character in the film, with Tatum believing he never would have had the chance to portray Gambit following the solo film's cancellation. Shawn Levy, one of the directors Tatum approached to direct Gambit, directed Deadpool & Wolverine and knew it would be "gratifying" for Tatum to be in the film as the character, adding lots of nonsensical lines in the screenplay and letting Tatum add a "lot" of Cajun and French flavor. Following the film's release, Tatum expressed his hopes that his appearance's reception may renew interest in a Gambit film, having informed Marvel about his wishes to still make the project while acknowledging it all depends on what Disney CEO Bob Iger and Marvel Studios president Kevin Feige decide. Commenting on the possibilities of a Gambit film materializing in an Instagram story, Reynolds expressed his interest in working with Tatum for the project, either by reprising his role as Wade Wilson / Deadpool or assisting the production in some other way. Reynolds released a deleted scene online featuring Tatum's Gambit having survived the events of the film and teasing the character's potential return; a version of that scene was included on the Time Variance Authority monitors in the background of the film's post-credits scene. Reynolds said in November that Marvel executives were "obsessed" with Tatum's portrayal of the character, comparing the film's cancellation and later responses to his casting and early portrayal as Deadpool.

In March 2025, Tatum was announced to be reprising his role as Gambit in Avengers: Doomsday (2026). In contrast to Deadpool & Wolverine, where Gambit's unintelligible Cajun accent was used for comedic effect, Tatum said he would not "go full Cajun" in Doomsday to maintain a more dramatic and serious tone. In November 2026, Tatum was still interested in starring in a Gambit film.

== See also ==
- Silver & Black (unproduced film), an unproduced film based on the Marvel characters Silver Sable and Black Cat
- Blade (unproduced film), an unproduced film based on the Marvel character of the same name
- List of unproduced Marvel Comics projects
