= Strange Girl =

Strange Girl or variants may refer to:

- Strange Girl (film), 1962 Yugoslav drama film
- Strange Girl (comics), comic series published by Image Comics
- Strange Girls (album), album by Gore Gore Girls (2000). The second album Up All Night, was released in 2002 and received
- Strange Girls (band), toured clubs in Great Britain in 1991
