= Jerome Opeña =

Filipino comic book artist

- Opeña at GalaxyCon San Jose 2026
- Born: Philippines
- Occupation: Comic book artist

Jerome Opeña is a Filipino comic book artist best known for his numerous collaborations with writer Rick Remender.

== Early life ==
Opeña was born in the Philippines, and spent most of his childhood in Taiwan, where his father worked for an international agricultural organization that was based there. When Opeña was approximately 16, his family moved to the United States, where he has lived ever since. Opeña attended art school for four years, and graduated when he was 24 years old.

== Career ==
After he graduated from art school, Opeña "floated around for a few years, did a lot of odd jobs here and there and the occasional illustration or concept art job", as well as some comic work. Opeña began work full-time in the industry in 2005 when he met Rick Remender, with whom he has collaborated on many of his projects. In 2009 he drew Vengeance of the Moon Knight ongoing series with writer Gregg Hurwitz. As part of the Marvel NOW! relaunch of Marvel's titles, Opeña teamed with writer Jonathan Hickman to launch The Avengers vol. 5 series in February 2013. He drew the first three issues. He also drew the Infinity limited series in 2013 with writer Jonathan Hickman.

In September 2019 Opeña drew Spawn issue 300, issue 301, an oversized anniversary issue, with various artists. He also provided a variant cover.

== Personal life ==
Opeña lives in Brooklyn, New York City.

== Bibliography ==
=== Interior work ===
- Star Wars Tales #13: "Mace Windu — The Sith in the Shadow" (with Bob Harris, anthology, Dark Horse, 2002)
- Métal Hurlant vol. 2 #3: "Who's Dreaming Now?" (with Alejandro Jodorowsky, anthology, Humanoids Publishing, 2003)
- Lone (with Stuart Moore, Rocket Comics):
  - "Bad Medicine" (in Rocket Comics: Ignite one-shot, 2003)
  - "Once Upon a Time in the Wasteland" (in #1–4 and 6, 2003–2004)
- Strange Girl #8 (with Rick Remender, Image, 2006)
- Fear Agent (with Rick Remender):
  - "Re-Ignition, Part 4" (with Tony Moore, in #4, Image, 2006)
  - "My War" (in #5–10, Image, 2006–2007)
  - "Hatchet Job" (with Kieron Dwyer, in #17–19 and 21, Dark Horse, 2007–2008)
- Wolverine (one-shots, Marvel):
  - Dangerous Games: "Purity" (with Rick Remender, anthology, 2008)
  - Flies to a Spider: "Swallowed the Spider" (with Gregg Hurwitz, 2009)
- The Punisher vol. 8 #1–5: "Living in Darkness" (with Rick Remender, Marvel, 2009)
- Vengeance of the Moon Knight #1–6: "Shock and Awe" (with Gregg Hurwitz, Marvel, 2009)
- Deadpool #1000: "Appetite for Destruction" (with Rick Remender, anthology, Marvel, 2010)
- Uncanny X-Force #1–4, 14–18 (with Rick Remender, Marvel, 2010–2012)
- The Avengers vol. 5 #1–3 (with Jonathan Hickman, Marvel, 2013)
- Infinity #2–6 (with Jonathan Hickman, Dustin Weaver (#2–5) and Jim Cheung (#6), Marvel, 2013–2014)
- The Avengers: Rage of Ultron (with Rick Remender and Pepe Larraz, graphic novel, Marvel, 2015)
- Seven to Eternity #1–6, 9–17 (with Rick Remender, Image, 2016–2021)
- Spawn #300–301 (with Todd McFarlane, among other artists, Image, 2019)

=== Covers only ===
- The Incal #7 (Humanoids Publishing, 2001)
- Fear Agent #20 (Dark Horse, 2008)
- Avengers vs. X-Men #4, 8, 12 (Marvel, 2012)
- Uncanny X-Force #25–32 (Marvel, 2012)
- Captain America vol. 7 #1 (Marvel, 2013)
- Infinity #1 (Marvel, 2013)
- Miracleman vol. 2 #1 (Marvel, 2014)
- Fantastic Four vol. 5 #1 (Marvel, 2014)
- Kick-Ass 3 #6 (Icon, 2014)
- Magneto vol. 2 #2 (Marvel, 2014)
- Wolverine vol. 6 #1 (Marvel, 2014)
- The Punisher vol. 10 #2 (Marvel, 2014)
- All-New Invaders #3 (Marvel, 2014)
- Hulk vol. 2 #1–3 (Marvel, 2014)
- Daredevil vol. 4 #3 (Marvel, 2014)
- The Amazing Spider-Man vol. 3 #1 (Marvel, 2014)
- Iron Fist: The Living Weapon #3 (Marvel, 2014)
- Spider-Gwen #1 (Marvel, 2015)
- Deadpool vol. 3 #45 (Marvel, 2015)
- Deadly Class #12 (Image, 2015)
- The Uncanny Inhumans #0 (Marvel, 2015)
- FCBD: The Avengers #1 (Marvel, 2015)
- Convergence #5 (DC Comics, 2015)
- Secret Wars: Marvel Zombies #1 (Marvel, 2015)
- The Amazing Spider-Man vol. 4 #1 (Marvel, 2016)
- Uncanny X-Men Omnibus Volume 3 (Marvel, 2016)
- Seven to Eternity #7–8 (Image, 2017)
- Shirtless Bear-Fighter! #5 (Image, 2017)
- Deathstroke vol. 4 #31 (DC Comics, 2018)
- Deadpool vol. 5 #1 (Marvel, 2018)
- The Amazing Spider-Man vol. 5 #1 (Marvel, 2018)
- Tony Stark: Iron Man #4 (Marvel, 2018)
- The Weatherman #6 (Image, 2018)
- X-Force vol. 5 #2 (Marvel, 2019)
- Cosmic Ghost Rider Destroys Marvel History #1 (Marvel, 2019)
- Justice League vol. 4 #23–24 (DC Comics, 2019)
- Batman/Superman vol. 2 #2 (DC Comics, 2019)
- Dark Nights: Death Metal #2 (DC Comics, 2020)
- Strange Academy #1 (Marvel, 2020)
- The Scumbag #1 (Image, 2020)
