= Black Science =

Black Science may refer to:

- Black Science (GZR album), 1997
- Black Science (Steve Coleman album), 1991
- Black Science (comics), an American science fiction comic book
