= X-Force =

Group of fictional characters

- Variant cover of X-Force (vol. 4) #2 (May 2014), art by Adi Granov

Publication information
- Publisher: Marvel Comics
- First appearance: The New Mutants #100 (April 1991)
- Created by: Fabian Nicieza; Rob Liefeld

In-story information
- Type of organization: Team
- Leader(s): Boom-Boom
- Agent(s): Current: Archangel; Boom-Boom; Hellverine; Ms. Marvel

Roster

X-Force is a team of superheroes appearing in American comic books published by Marvel Comics, most commonly in association with the X-Men. Conceived by writer/illustrator Rob Liefeld, the team first appeared in New Mutants #100 (April 1991) and soon afterwards was featured in its own series called X-Force. The group was originally a revamped version of the 1980s team the New Mutants.

X-Force's first leader was the mutant Cable. An offshoot of the X-Men, X-Force takes a more militant and aggressive approach towards its enemies compared to the X-Men.

An alternate incarnation of X-Force appears in the 2018 film Deadpool 2 as part of the X-Men film series. A planned X-Force film adaptation was in production at 20th Century Fox, but canceled after Disney acquired the studio.

== Publication history ==
=== Publication ===
The X-Force series was successful in the early 1990s, with its popularity holding steady after Liefeld left. As with other X-titles in the 1990s, Marvel implemented various reforms to the title throughout its run until 2001, with varying degrees of success. Declining sales on the X-Force series eventually prompted Marvel to revamp the title in 2001 with a new cast in the form of a group of self-interested young mutants who were gathered together by a corporation to become media stars and used the name X-Force. X-Force was canceled with #129 and relaunched as X-Statix, which coincided with a similar rebranding of the team in the story. After X-Statix was canceled with #26, Marvel reunited the original X-Force team for a six-issue 2004 miniseries plotted and drawn by Liefeld.

In 2007–2008, during the Messiah Complex crossover event, a new version of the X-Force team was formed with Wolverine leading a militaristic black ops branch of the X-Men. This squad would form the basis for a new X-Force series starting February 2008 by writers Craig Kyle and Christopher Yost, plus Clayton Crain as the artist. The series came to a conclusion in September 2010 as part of the Second Coming storyline that ran through various X-titles. The title was then relaunched in October 2010 as Uncanny X-Force with Rick Remender and Jerome Opeña as the creative team and Wolverine, Psylocke, Deadpool, Archangel, Fantomex, and E.V.A. as the initial roster.

The Uncanny X-Force series ended at issue #35 in 2012 and was once again relaunched as Uncanny X-Force (vol. 2) as part of Marvel NOW!, with a new team led by Storm and Psylocke, written by Sam Humphries. A concurrent X-Force book written by Dennis Hopeless, Cable and X-Force, was released at the same time, bringing Cable back into the X-Force fold. The two series ended in 2014 after a crossover between the two titled "Vendetta". A new X-Force (vol. 4), written by X-Men: Legacy writer Simon Spurrier, was launched featuring a black ops squad consisting of Cable, Psylocke, Fantomex, and Marrow.

=== Uncanny X-Force ===
X-Force was replaced in October 2010 with Uncanny X-Force by Rick Remender and Jerome Opeña. This new series introduces team members Psylocke, Fantomex, and Deadpool. According to Remender, "This is a group of characters that have had their souls stained by evil forces in the past, a common thread connecting them. They've already made the hard compromises in the past; they've all taken life."

The title had a three-issue "Fear Itself" tie-in miniseries, written by Rob Williams, with art by Simone Bianchi. As of issue #34, thirty-one characters were killed and 14 of them were from the "Age of Apocalypse" timeline.

=== Uncanny X-Force (vol. 2): 2013–2014 ===
As part of Marvel NOW!, two new X-Force series would replace Remender's Uncanny X-Force. Prior to their announcement, the two titles were teased by a single word and the book's creative team: "Wanted" with Dennis Hopeless and Salvador Larroca and "Killers" with Sam Humphries and Ron Garney. "Wanted" was first revealed to be the brand new "Cable and X-Force", with "Killers" later revealed to be a relaunched "Uncanny X-Force."

Cable and X-Force, written by Hopeless and penciled by Larroca, features Cable on the run after awakening from a coma in the post-AvX world. Harkening back to the early days of the original X-Force, Cable leads an outlaw X-Force team consisting of Domino, Colossus, Forge, Doctor Nemesis and Boom-Boom, whose missions of stopping tragedies before they happen puts them at odds with the newly formed Uncanny Avengers, led by Cable's uncle Havok.

The relaunched Uncanny X-Force was written by Sam Humphries and penciled by Ron Garney, and featured a Psylocke-led team with an initial roster of Storm, Puck, and Cluster. They would be joined by Spiral and Bishop as they sought to locate a psychic mutant girl who had been kidnapped.

== Fictional history ==
=== X-Force (vol. 3) ===
==== Angels and Demons ====
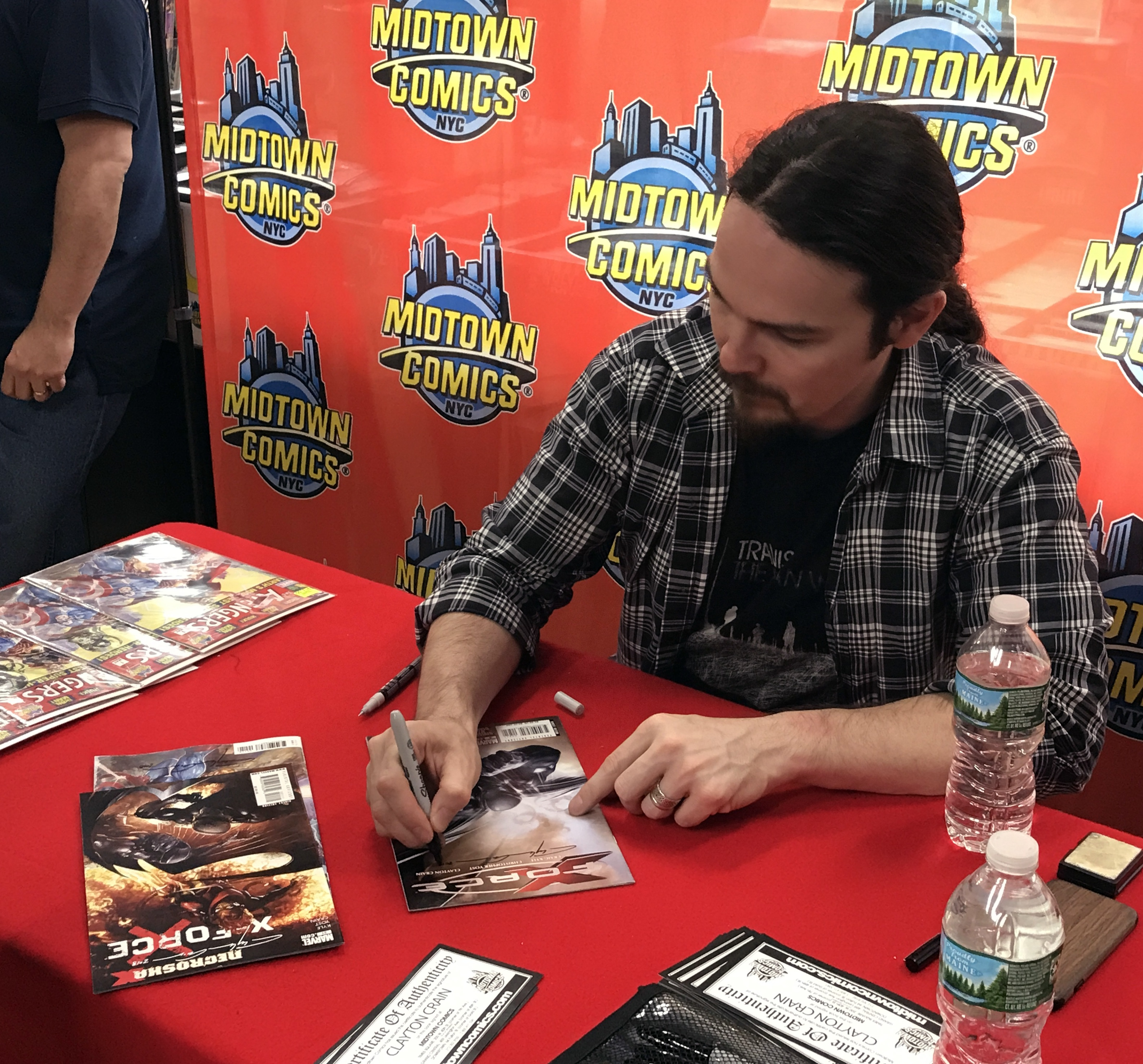
Artist Clayton Crain signing copies of the series' third volume during an appearance at Midtown Comics in Manhattan

The Purifiers, led by Matthew Risman and Eli Bard, resurrect Bastion by attaching his head to a Nimrod unit. Bastion retrieves an offspring of Magus from the ocean floor and revives several deceased enemies of the X-Men, including Cameron Hodge, Bolivar Trask, and Graydon Creed, by infecting their corpses with the Transmode Virus. He also infects two living subjects with the virus: Donald Pierce and the Leper Queen.

During X-Force's raid on a Purifier base, Risman holds Wolfsbane hostage. While Wolverine calls for the team to stand down, X-23 decides Risman is bluffing and activates a concealed detonator, causing an explosion that destroys most of the base. After interrogating and killing numerous Purifiers, X-Force finds Wolfsbane held in a warehouse, barely alive. Wolfsbane is healed by Elixir, but attacks X-23 before handing over Angel's wings to the Purifiers.

Elixir heals both his and Angel's wounds, but discovers that Angel's wings are not organic and cannot be regrown. Angel transforms into Archangel, who retains metallic wings. X-Force pursues Archangel to the Purifiers' base, where X-23 kills Risman. Afterwards, X-Force finds Archangel unconscious and in human form with his original wings restored.

==== Old Ghosts ====
While in pursuit of Vanisher, the team runs into Domino, who joins forces with them to recover the Legacy Virus. After cornering Vanisher, Elixir gives him an inoperable brain tumor to ensure his cooperation. Vanisher reveals he lost the virus while escaping from a horde of Marauder clones that were awakened after the death of Mister Sinister. Domino retrieves the virus, only to be confronted by shocktroopers who have come to take the virus for themselves. X-23 is injected with the virus while doing battle, but is healed by Elixir. With Vanisher in tow, X-Force returns home.

Meanwhile, Warpath returns to his tribe's reservation at Camp Verde to visit his brother John's grave, but discovers the empty graves of his entire tribe before being violently attacked by the Demon Bear. As he is about to be killed, Warpath is saved by Ghost Rider, who offers to teach him how to kill a demon. After engaging the Demon Bear in battle once more, Ghost Rider realizes the demon is reacting to pain caused by a dagger embedded in its body. Once Warpath removes the dagger, the demon is revealed to be the spirit guides of Warpath's tribe, corrupted by black magic. The spirits grant Warpath a vision that reveals the history of the man responsible for digging up the graves of his tribe: Eli Bard. Warpath returns home and tells X-Force what the spirits showed him, which ends with the revelation that Bard is using the Transmode Virus to revive dead mutants as an offering to Selene. Shortly afterward, Cyclops sends X-Force to the future to retrieve Cable and Hope Summers.

==== Not Forgotten ====
Not Forgotten takes place directly after X-Force's return to the present. X-23 emerges from the timestream in time to save Boom-Boom from being killed by the Leper Queen. X-23 kills the Leper Queen, but she and Boom-Boom are taken into custody by H.A.M.M.E.R. Boom-Boom is freed from H.A.M.M.E.R. custody by Warpath, while X-23 is returned to the Facility. She wakes up to find her left arm severed by Kimura. Before she can cut off X-23's right arm, Kimura is shot by Agent Morales. X-23 and Morales make their way to a Facility lab containing mass amounts of the chemical trigger that forces X-23 to kill. X-23 is exposed to the trigger via the room's sprinkler system, but is cleansed shortly afterward. Kimura knocks out X-23 and murders the Facility head, framing X-23 for his death.

==== Necrosha ====
X-Force is involved in the battle against Selene's resurrected mutant forces on Utopia, until Cyclops sends them to Genosha to kill Selene.

They arrive at Necrosha and manage to rescue Warpath, who then leads them in battle against Selene, and manage to kill her using an old ritual of Warpath's tribe. Wolverine tells Cyclops that Warpath, X-23, Wolfsbane and Elixir are out of the team, but Cyclops insists that X-Force will be needed more than ever in the time ahead.

==== X-Men: Second Coming ====
X-Force is joined by Cable and Cypher on a time-traveling mission to stop an invasion of Nimrods sent from a possible dystopian future. As Cable only has one use remaining on his time-traveling device, it is believed to be a one-way suicide mission. After they complete their mission and Cable sacrifices himself to return X-Force to the present, Hope's mutant powers emerge and she destroys Bastion. After the battle, Logan is confronted by Storm about X-Force. She tells Logan that he never should have involved Warpath, Wolfsbane and X-23, and Logan tells her that he never wanted them involved, but does not regret what they did. Logan tells X-23 that she's out and to figure out what she wants from life. Afterward, Logan discusses the future of X-Force with Cyclops, who decides to disband the team. Logan meets with his new team a short time later, consisting of himself, Archangel, Fantomex, Psylocke, and Deadpool, deciding to run a new X-Force team without the knowledge of Cyclops or the other X-Men.

=== X-Force (vol. 4) ===
==== Dirty/Tricks ====
The new X-force consists of Cable, Marrow, Psylocke, Fantomex, and Doctor Nemesis. They are investigating an explosion in Alexandria that put Hope Summers into a coma and find a new mutant nicknamed Meme, who is comatose and can only communicate through computers. They discover Russian billionaire Yevgeny-Malevitch Volga is behind the Alexandria explosion and the kidnapping. He has been kidnapping mutants and supercharging them with kinetic energy and making them into human bombs. While in Paris, the group kidnaps Le Necrogateur, a mutant who can read the minds of the deceased. Using his powers, X-Force discovers Volga's headquarters and uncovers that Volga found a mutant who can teleport between dimensions. Threatening the death of his family, they force the teleporting mutant to bring back a powerful weapon from Earth-1287 that creates super soldiers but greatly decreases their lifespan. During the attack on Volga's base, Marrow discovers that she was pregnant during M-Day and volunteered to get her powers back at the cost of her pregnancy. She has a mental breakdown and X-Force is captured. It seems all is lost when Cable is super-charged and blown up by Volga. It turns out that Cable was present at Alexandria and it was he and Hope that caused the explosion when he was supercharged by Volga's henchman. Hope mimicked his powers and the chemicals caused her to fall into a coma. Cable survived the explosions since he was not really there—Dr. Nemesis keeps Cable locked in stasis and creates a clone of him every day and uploads his memories.

==== Hide/Fear ====
Cable and X-Force, who have barely survived their ordeal with Volga, track a team of British special forces into the desert. The team is tracking terrorists known as the Quaddees. It turns out Volga sold his tech to both the British and the Quaddees. X-Force begins abducting the team, but are attacked by Pete Wisdom, Meggan, and Excalibur from MI-13. The Quaddees kidnap one member of the team, so the three groups decide to work together. Psylocke is able to find out that the super-powered British Special forces team will all die soon from Volga's tech, so the team sacrifices themselves so MI-13 and X-Force can escape. They also learn that there's a secret organization called the Yellow Eye spying on all mutants, who also kidnapped Domino. This series also retcons multiple X-Men backstories with the introduction of ForgetMeNot, a mutant who has aided the X-Men, but has been completely forgotten due to his powers. Dr. Nemesis, using an algorithm based on blurs in camera footage and missing toilet paper at the X-Mansion creates a teleporter to bring ForgetMeNot to the X-Force base on an abandoned S.H.I.E.L.D. Helicarrier. The team has great difficulty catching ForgetMeNot, since whenever he hides they forgot about him then take a coffee break, where a prerecorded video by Dr. Nemesis plays reminding them to find ForgetMeNot. This turns into a vicious cycle until ForgetMeNot realizes that he was brought here to trick the Yellow Eye spybots into allowing himself to be tracked, place a reverse tracking beacon on one and then the drone will forget him immediately and not self-destruct. This plan works; however, Fantomex then kills ForgetMeNot. Stating that he knew about him all the time since he has three brains and nanobots in his brain. Fantomex says he does it because he is evil and bored. The ships cleaning bots sweep away ForgetMeNot's body; Dr. Nemesis forgets speaking with him and assumes he figured out how to track the spybots on his own.

==== Ends/Means ====
The team attacks the Yellow Eye base, but during the battle Meme/Hope Summers hacks into Fantomex's consciousness to learn why he broke up with her. He then reveals that he knew Hope Summers was posing as Meme. He then betrays the team and plans to use the Yellow Eye tracking technology to find his missing clones (Cluster and Weapon XIII). Domino is brainwashed by the Yellow Eye, but Meme is able to hack into her and free her. She then shoots Fantomex in the head. It turns out Yellow Eye is actually Mojo, who reveals that Meme is Hope Summers. Cable debates using the Yellow Eye technology, but Psylocke wants the facility destroyed. They do not have time to debate since the second clone of Cable was already at the facility with Dr. Nemesis tracking Volga during the prior fight. The team does not have time to debate the morality since Fantomex was able to recode Volga's super virus code when he died and E.V.A. reloaded the virus to give her unlimited superpowers. However, since his mind is still mechanical Meme hacked into him making him think he killed the team, while they actually escaped. Cable tricks Fantomex into fighting him, but is actually getting Fantomex to destroy various spy agencies and evil organizations. ForgetMeNot also reveals himself to Hope Summers and explains that the original Meme is still alive and saved him by transferring his consciousness and then repaired his body with the ships clean up bots. He reveals that Meme is actually dying, and once she dies Hope will not be able to copy Meme's powers and communicate with the team using her hacking powers. After Meme dies, ForgetMeNot reveals himself to the team and asks Marrow to touch Hope's body. Hope copies Marrow's healing factor and is able to temporarily heal herself enough to play a video showing how Cable has been manipulating the team. Domino and Psylocke distract Fantomex while ForgetMeNot sneaks up to him and teleports him to Hope, who copies his super-powers, as well as the entire teams. She releases all the Cable clones against Fantomex. Afterwards, Cable is removed from X-Force.

=== Inglorious X-Force ===
Having failed to prevent the assassination of the first mutant President of the United States, which would trigger a war between mutantkind and humanity, Cable returns to the present suffering from partial amnesia and with the names of Archangel, Hellverine, and Boom-Boom etched onto his arm alongside the message "One of Us". Believing one of them to be the future assassin, Cable reforms X-Force and recruits Ms. Marvel, whom he identifies as the future president, for her protection. Cable uses the team's missions to assess and eventually exonerate each of his recruits, concluding that the assassin may instead be a member of the revived Mutant Liberation Front. X-Force subsequently battles the organization and exposes its leader, Kali, as a human supremacist.

Meanwhile, Domino, whom Cable had secretly hired to investigate his memory lapses, discovers that an unknown entity is controlling him. She assembles a second X-Force team to confront Cable and expose the entity, which reveals itself as Catharsix, a sentient bioweapon created by Apocalypse that Cable had unknowingly been exposed to in the past and which had gradually taken control of his body. Revealed to be the future assassin under Catharsix's control, Cable travels to the future to kill President Khan, but X-Force pursues him and prevents the assassination, freeing him from the bioweapon's influence. Realizing that his actions had created a time loop and disrupted the timestream, Cable sends X-Force back to the present while remaining behind to repair the damage. He then etches the three names and the message "One of Us" onto his arm, revealing that they were intended as reminders of those who could help stop him rather than warnings about potential assassins. Meanwhile, Catharsix survives and frames X-Force for an attack on a mutant refugee camp, forcing the team to go on the run. However, Catharsix survives and frames X-Force for an attack on a mutant refugee camp, forcing the team to go on the run.

== Awards ==
Issues #57–58 of the first series were part of the Onslaught storyline which was a top vote-getter for the Comics Buyer's Guide Fan Award for Favorite Comic-Book Story for 1997.

== The original X-Force ==
Before the team best known as X-Force debuted, Marvel introduced an unrelated, little-known group also called X-Force. It was a short-lived group that was designed to replace Freedom Force. The members were not mutants, but received their powers artificially and were named after the X-Men. This group was organized by a government agency known as M Branch and only appeared in the pages of Cloak and Dagger #9–10 (1990).

== Other versions ==
- In the alternate reality of the "Days of Future Now" storyline, the X-Force consists of Banshee, Black Tom Cassidy, Cannonball, Domino, Meltdown and Omega Red.
- In X-Men '92, X-Force consists of Cable, Domino, Deadpool, Psylocke, Archangel, and Bishop.

== In other media ==
=== Television ===
X-Force appears in X-Men '97, led by Cable and consisting of Jubilee, Sunspot, Psylocke, and Archangel.

=== Film ===
- 20th Century Fox were in the midst of developing a film adaptation of X-Force. On July 11, 2013, it was reported that Jeff Wadlow had been hired to write and direct the adaptation. Lauren Shuler Donner and Matthew Vaughn would have produced. On December 3, 2013, Rob Liefeld confirmed that Cable and Deadpool would be appearing in the film. The film was planned to be released sometime in 2017. On February 5, 2019, X-Men film producer Lauren Shuler Donner revealed that X-Force, as well as the rest of the Fox Marvel films, were "on hold" until the Disney-Fox deal went through.
- X-Force appears in Deadpool 2, led by Deadpool and consisting of Domino, Bedlam, Shatterstar, Zeitgeist, Vanisher, and Peter. Deadpool and Weasel form the group to confront Cable. However, all except Deadpool and Domino are killed after their first mission begins. After the death of the original lineup, a second lineup of X-Force is formed, comprising Deadpool, Domino, Cable, Colossus. In a post-credits scene, Deadpool uses Cable's time-travel device to travel back in time and save Peter.

=== Video games ===
- X-Force appears in Deadpool's ending in Ultimate Marvel vs. Capcom 3, consisting of Domino, Fantomex, and Archangel.
- X-Force appears in Marvel Contest of Champions, consisting of Archangel, X-23, Domino, Cable, Deadpool, and Psylocke.
- X-Force appears as a team bonus in Marvel Ultimate Alliance 3: The Black Order, consisting Wolverine, Psylocke, Nightcrawler, Deadpool, Storm and Cable.
