= Fear Agent =

American comic book series

- Cover of Fear Agent 4 (May 2006), art by Tony Moore

Publication information
- Publisher: Dark Horse Comics; Image Comics
- Schedule: Monthly
- Format: Ongoing series
- Genre: Science fiction
- Publication date: October 2005 – November 2011
- No. of issues: 32 (of 32)
- Main character: Heath Huston

Creative team
- Written by: Rick Remender
- Artist(s): Tony Moore (#1–4, 12–15, 22–27); Jerome Opena (#4–10, 17–19, 21); Francesco Francavilla (#11); Eric Nguyen (#16); Kieron Dwyer (#20–21)

Collected editions
- Volume 1: Re-Ignition: ISBN 1-59307-764-5

Fear Agent is an American science fiction comic book series written by Rick Remender with art by Tony Moore and Jerome Opena, who alternated on story arcs. The series was published by Dark Horse Comics from 2007 to 2018 and by Image Comics from 2005 to 2006 and currently from 2018.

The series stars the rugged alcoholic Texas spaceman Heathrow Huston, the supposed last Fear Agent, in a series of fast-paced adventures. The series emphasizes action, adventure, horror, and plot twists rather than realism or scientific detail; Remender claims in the first issue that "science fiction has lost its stones" and that Fear Agent was his attempt to fight that trend. Numerous incidents that occur early in the series are left unexplained for a large period of the story in order to reinforce this.

== Publication history ==
The series launched in October 2005, published by Image Comics. It ran for 11 issues. In September 2006, Dark Horse Comics announced that Fear Agent would be moving to Dark Horse. The company reprinted the first trade paperback collection (originally published by Image), released on April 28, 2007. The second volume followed on May 30, 2007.

On June 13, 2007, Dark Horse began Fear Agent: The Last Goodbye, a four-part mini-series telling of the alien invasion and creation of the Fear Agents by way of flashback after issue 10's events.

After completion of The Last Goodbye and a one-shot "Tales of the Fear Agent: Twelve Steps in One," Dark Horse resumed chronological numbering for the series with number 17, making "The Last Goodbye" issues 12–15 and the one-shot #16.

The series went on a hiatus with issue #27 (cover dated June 2009), following Remender signing an exclusive deal with Marvel, but restarted in July 2010 for the last five-issue storyline "Out of Step".

== Synopsis ==
=== Issues 1–4: "Re-Ignition" ===
Heath Huston is a Fear Agent, a member of a task force dedicated to eradicating alien threats to member planets, which in Heath's case, is Earth. A Mark Twain-studying redneck alcoholic from Texas, Heath spends his days conversing with Annie, the A.I. system of his spaceship.

After a close escape from the planet Frazterga, Heath is forced to investigate an abandoned space outpost with whom he cannot communicate. The compound has been invaded by Feeders, a plasmoid-like octopoid race that devour their victims using powerful stomach acids and reproduce more of their kind. Heath discovers that the race that uses them in biological warfare, the Dressites, who have previously attempted to destroy Earth, intend to make another attempt on the planet.

Heading back to Earth, Heath picks up Mara, another survivor from the mostly decimated Earth. Heath is sidetracked into joining with a race of seemingly primitive aliens, only to find they are not what they seem. It is revealed that Heath is the lone remaining Fear Agent, following the mass slaughter of all of the other Fear Agents in an unknown incident. Heath then discovers a member of the "primitive" race is planning to betray him and his brethren by giving him to the Dressite Empire, who have posted a bounty on his head for a prior incident.

=== Issues 5–10: "My War" ===
A race of aliens clone Heath and place his conscious mind in a new body. He sets out to go back in time, hoping to stop the robotic Tetaldians, the second alien race that has targeted Earth for destruction. Flashbacks reveal that an alien invasion lead to the deaths of Heath's son and father, explaining his hatred of those races. Heath successfully stops the Tetaldian threat early on.

Heath is imprisoned by The Keepers, a race of aliens responsible for the fabric of time who plan to restore the Teteldian Empire. After The Keepers release him, he becomes sexually involved with Mara. He then receives a message from a mysterious version of Mara, but disregards it. Heath returns to Earth to see if his wife, Charlotte is alive, but finds Earth overrun by the Dressen Empire, and believes Charlotte dead. An army of Dressites attack Heath, but a small army of Fear Agents rescue Heath. When the group return to their base on the Moon, Heath discovers Charlotte is now the head of the Earth rebellion, and is happily married to one of the other Fear Agents.

=== Issue 11: "Along Came a Spider" ===
An issue-long "Tales of the Fear Agent" illustrated by Francesco Francavilla. A population of human flies pays Heath to protect them from a race of spiders slowly taking over their world. However, when Heath becomes impregnated with the spiders' eggs he becomes the planet's greatest threat.

=== Issues 12–15: "The Last Goodbye" ===
Picking up at the end of the "My War" arc, Heath, after finding out that Charlotte has remarried, drunkenly reflects on the graves of his fallen comrades, leading to an interlude depicting the origins of the Fear Agents.

During an alien invasion of Earth, the entire population of Earth is seemingly decimated. Heath, a trucker, loses his entire family with the exception of his wife, Charlotte. The couple join a handful of survivors seeking refuge in the bomb shelter of a neighbor named Pete Timberson, where they are caught in the crossfire of a skirmish between a race of humanoid amoeba called the Dressites and a race of robots called the Tetaldians. Heath rallies the survivors to fight the invaders, and show them the meaning of the word "Fear", and thus, the Fear Agents are born. The Fear Agents scavenge advanced weaponry from defeated soldiers on both sides of the conflict, including rocket packs, powerful energy weapons, and conveyances that permit interstellar space travel and teleportation through wormholes. The Fear Agents amass an army of survivors and invade the Dressite base on the Moon. As this occurs, the Fear Agents on Earth discover one of their own is a traitor who used the wormhole teleportation technology to lead the Dressites to the Moon base, allowing them to set a trap with which they eradicate the agents invading the base. Heath is left believing that he is one of a few remaining resistance members.

Enraged at the loss of his comrades, Heath takes a bomb to the Dressite homeworld, despite his close friend Otto's dying wish that Heath not commit genocide of the entire Dressite race. Heath goes through with his plan. Later, after awakening back on Earth, Heath learns that the Dressites have left. A representative from the United Systems lands on Earth, and explains that the Dressite military was serving as their peace keeping force, and is very unpopular on their homeworld. Resentful of being ostracized at home and forced to protect other species far from home, the Dressites unfairly took out their frustrations on humanity. The representative believes that the Tetaldians carried out the genocide, but Charlotte realizes with horror that it was in fact her husband that killed trillions of innocent Dressites. Horrified at this, Charlotte leaves him. A bounty is then placed on Heath's head by the Dressites.

=== Issue 16: "Tales of the Fear Agent: Twelve Steps in One" ===
Heath works through a drunken haze to stop alien exploiters from endangering innocent lives in the name of profit.

=== Issues: 17–21: "Hatchet Job" ===
Mara's past is revealed in this story. A space pirate named Levi sells her and her family to a cannibalistic race looking for a foothold on Earth, sparking a lifelong desire for revenge on Mara's part.

Heath goes to the Feeders' homeworld to find their natural predator, a task in which he is reluctantly partnered with Charlotte's new husband. The Feeders capture them and force them to battle to the death, but even as Heath is losing, Charlotte's husband impales himself on Heath's weapon, revealing that the daughter he raised as his own is actually Heath's. Heath is sent free.

Meanwhile, Charlotte learns that the Dressites have promised to give her Levi's location in exchange for Mara's help in capturing the surviving Fear Agents. Charlotte's team ends up stranded on a planet whose inhabitants conducted an experiment that turned them into soul-eating ghouls. After some members of their team are killed, Mara sends a message to Heath the past but the Heath in the past disregards her message.

Heath makes his way to the planet and saves Charlotte, while Mara goes to Levi's pirate ship. She witnesses a Dressite telling one of his fellow pirates about Heath's bounty, but kills the pirate before he can tell his comrades. Heath tries to convince Mara not to kill Levi since it will spiral into more Galactic civil war. Levi fatally shoots Mara, and throws Heath out the airlock. Facing certain death, Heath admits to himself that he saw Levi taking the gun and let him shoot Mara anyway.

=== Issues 22–27: "I Against I" ===
After being travelling the other side of a black hole, Heath finds himself in another universe, and marooned on the desolate Planet Westx. A stranger in a strange place, the last Fear Agent enters a world populated by gun-slinging robots and venomous mutants in this six-part sci-fi Western.

=== Issues 28–32: "Out of Step" ===
The final storyline. Heath Huston is the only remaining human in a universe that has been totally amalgamated by Tetaldian robotic conquerors. As the Tetaldians continue to hunt him, Heath uncovers the history of the robot hordes and their secret co conspirators. His body aged and broken, he is finally presented with one final opportunity for redemption.

== Collected editions ==
=== Initial TPB Collections ===
The series was collected into a number of trade paperbacks:

#	Title	Material collected	Published date	ISBN
1	Re-Ignition	Fear Agent #1–4	May 9, 2007	ISBN 978-1-59307-764-8
2	My War	Fear Agent #5–10	May 23, 2007	ISBN 978-1-59307-766-2
3	The Last Goodbye	Fear Agent: The Last Goodbye #1–4*	March 12, 2008	ISBN 978-1-59307-929-1
4	Hatchet Job	Fear Agent #17–21	August 27, 2008	ISBN 978-1-59307-974-1
5	I Against I	Fear Agent #22–27	January 15, 2010	ISBN 978-1-59582-249-9
6	Out of Step	Fear Agent #28–32	April 18, 2012	ISBN 978-1-59582-880-4
X	Tales of the Fear Agent	Backup stories from Fear Agent #5–11, stories from MySpace Dark Horse Presents #3–4, and Tales of the Fear Agent: Twelve Steps in One	May 7, 2008	ISBN 978-1-59307-959-8

*Note: After completion of "The Last Goodbye", Dark Horse adopted a chronological numbering for the series in addition to the arc numbering, hence "The Last Goodbye" makes up issues #12–15.

=== "Library Edition" (hardcover) ===
In December 2012 an oversized hardcover, dubbed the library edition was printed collecting issues #1–15 of the acclaimed Fear Agent comics, along with half of the Tales of the Fear Agent side-stories, covers, pin-ups, and artists' sketch galleries. The second volume originally planned to be released the following year was put on hold till it was released in April 2014. This collects issues #17–32 of the popular series, also includes Tales of the Fear Agent bonus stories and a massive gallery of covers, sketches, and pin ups.

#	Title	Material collected	Published date	ISBN
1	Fear Agent Library Edition Volume 1	Fear Agent #1–11, Fear Agent: The Last Goodbye #1–4,Tales of the Fear Agent: Twelve Steps in One, Fear Agent: Nothing To Fear (originally included in MySpace Dark Horse Presents #3-4)	December 25, 2012	ISBN 978-1616550059
2	Fear Agent Library Edition Volume 2	Fear Agent #17–32 and Tales of the Fear Agent bonus stories	April 8, 2014	ISBN 978-1616551032

=== "Final Edition" (softcover) ===
In 2018, a new series of deluxe softcover collections were published by Image Comics.

#	Title	Material collected	Published date	ISBN
1	Fear Agent Final Edition Volume 1	Fear Agent #1–10	April 24, 2018	ISBN 978-1534307971
2	Fear Agent Final Edition Volume 2	Fear Agent #12–21	July 17, 2018	ISBN 978-1534308244
3	Fear Agent Final Edition Volume 3	Fear Agent #22–32	September 11, 2018	ISBN 978-1534308268
4	Fear Agent Final Edition Volume 4	Tales of the Fear Agent: Twelve Steps in One, Fear Agent: Nothing To Fear, Tales of the Fear Agent bonus stories	December 18, 2018	ISBN 978-1534308756

== TV adaptation ==
In July 2009, Universal Pictures were in the early stages of developing a film based on the series.

In January 2020, David F. Sandberg, along with Evan Goldberg and Seth Rogen, were said to be adapting the comic book into a TV series for Amazon.
