= Deadly Class (TV series) =

American action television series

- Genre: Action; Adventure; Black comedy; Drama; Thriller
- Based on: Deadly Class by Rick Remender & Wesley Craig
- Developed by: Rick Remender; Miles Orion Feldsott
- Starring: Benedict Wong; Benjamin Wadsworth; Lana Condor; María Gabriela de Faría; Luke Tennie; Liam James; Michel Duval
- Composer: Nathan Matthew David
- Country of origin: United States
- Original language: English
- No. of seasons: 1
- No. of episodes: 10

Production
- Executive producers: Anthony Russo Joe Russo; Rick Remender; Miles Orion Feldsott; Mick Betancourt; Lee Toland Krieger; Mike Larocca; Adam Targum
- Producers: John G. Lenic; Albert J. Kim
- Production locations: Vancouver, British Columbia, Canada
- Cinematography: Tim Ives; Owen McPolin
- Editors: Jeff Groth; John Peter Bernardo
- Running time: 43–54 minutes
- Production companies: Gozie AGBO; Chipmunk Hill; Getaway Productions; Giant Generator; 2 Miles Entertainment; Universal Cable Productions; Sony Pictures Television

Original release
- Network: Syfy
- Release: January 16 – March 20, 2019

Deadly Class is an American action drama television series developed by Rick Remender and Miles Orion Feldsott for Syfy. It is based on the comic book series of the same name created by Remender and Wesley Craig and published by Image Comics. The series stars Benedict Wong, Benjamin Wadsworth, Lana Condor, María Gabriela de Faría, Luke Tennie, Liam James, and Michel Duval. Set in the late 1980s, the series revolves around King's Dominion, an elite private academy where students are trained to become assassins.

The series was produced by Sony Pictures Television and Universal Cable Productions, in association with Gozie AGBO, Chipmunk Hill, Getaway Productions, Giant Generator and 2 Miles Entertainment. Anthony Russo and Joe Russo served as executive producers alongside Remender, Feldsott, Mick Betancourt, Lee Toland Krieger, Mike Larocca, and Adam Targum. In November 2017, casting began for a pilot ordered by Syfy. In April 2018, the series was picked up for an order of 10 episodes. Filming took place in Vancouver, British Columbia.

The first episode premiered as a special preview online on December 20, 2018 and on Syfy on December 30; the series officially premiered on January 16, 2019. It received mixed reviews from critics, with many praising the cast, visuals, and choreography while criticizing the tone and pacing. The series was canceled in June 2019.

== Premise ==
The show takes place during the late 1980s counterculture, and follows homeless teen Marcus Lopez Arguello as he is recruited into King's Dominion, an elite private school for the children of the world's top crime families. Marcus navigates a morally challenging curriculum, social cliques and all adolescent uncertainties in this relentless setting.

== Cast and characters ==
=== Main ===
- Benedict Wong as Master Lin, the ruthless, no-nonsense headmaster of King's Dominion
- Benjamin Wadsworth as Marcus Lopez Arguello, King's Dominion's newest addition and Saya's pledge
- Lana Condor as Saya Kuroki (Japanese: 黒木沙耶, Hepburn: Kuroki Saya), the leader of the Kuroki Syndicate (Note: Also known as the Kuroki-gumi (黒木組), it is considered Japan's largest Yakuza syndicate in the Deadly Class universe.) and Marcus's sponsor
- María Gabriela de Faría as Maria Salazar, a member of the Soto Vatos and Chico's former girlfriend
- Luke Tennie as Willie Lewis, leader of the F.W.O. (Final World Order) and Marcus's best friend at King's Dominion
- Liam James as Billy Bennett, a punk rocker who is one of Marcus's best friends and the son of a corrupt, drug smuggling cop
- Michel Duval as Chico, the leader of the Soto Vatos, and Maria's former boyfriend

=== Recurring ===
- Taylor Hickson as Petra, a goth hailing from a death cult
- Siobhan Williams as Brandy Lynn, a racist Southern belle and the leader of the Dixie Mob
- Sean Depner as Viktor, notorious as the son of Joseph Stalin's top assassin
- Jack Gillett as Lex Miller, an easygoing outcast
- Isaiah Lehtinen as Shabnam, shunned by his peers, son of a wealthy banker
- Juan Grey as Juan, a member of Maria's clique Soto Vatos
- Tom Stevens as Chester "Fuckface" Wilson, Marcus's psychopathic bunkmate
- Sam Jin Coates as Yukio (Japanese: ゆきお, Hepburn: Yukio), a member of the Kuroki Syndicate and a student at King's Dominion
- Brian Posehn as Dwight Shandy, an aging stoner
- Olivia Cheng as Madame Gao, head of that assassins guild and Master Lin's sister
- David Zayas as El Alma Del Diablo, Chico's father
- Viva Lee as Nahia, Master Lin's daughter
- Victor Andrés Trelles Turgeon as Holy Ghost, El Diablo's enforcer

=== Guest ===
- Henry Rollins as Jürgen Denke, former Poison Lab instructor
- Erica Cerra as Miss De Luca, Hand-to-Hand Combat instructor
- Ryan Robbins as Rory Heemsle, homeless man who terrorized and preyed on other homeless individuals
- Graeme Meekison as Jaden, an attending student at King's Dominion
- Theresa Wong as Shu, Master Lin's wife
- Kelcey Mawema as Gabrielle, a young woman who befriends and romances Willie
- Christopher Heyerdahl as Master Zane, combat skills instructor
- French Stewart as Scorpio Slasher, psychopathy instructor
- Chanelle Peloso as Sue Ann, Chester's ally
- Ice-T as himself
- Doralynn Mui as Riku (Japanese: リク, Hepburn: Riku), a top lieutenant in the Kuroki Syndicate

== Episodes ==
Episode titles are taken from punk rock songs of the 1980s.

No.	Title	Directed by	Written by	Original release date	Prod. code	U.S. viewers (millions)
1	"Reagan Youth"	Lee Toland Krieger	Teleplay by : Rick Remender & Miles Orion Feldsott	December 30, 2018 (Note: The timeslot premiere was on January 16, 2019, which received 598k viewers and a 0.2 18–49 rating.)	100	0.355
In 1987 San Francisco, Marcus, a homeless teenager, fights for survival and unexpectedly finds purpose to his life when he is recruited by Master Lin, the headmaster at an elite academy called King's Dominion. In order to pass his classes, he must learn the deadly arts to be an assassin- while dealing with unwelcoming schoolmates.
2	"Noise, Noise, Noise"	Adam Kane	Rick Remender	January 23, 2019	101	0.438
Feeling remorse for killing Rory, Marcus begins to integrate socially into the school. More situations arise when a party is being held at Shabnam's – with all the school students being invited. Meanwhile, Jürgen Denke tells Master Lin that he intends to resign from the academy.
3	"Snake Pit"	Adam Kane	Krystal Houghton Ziv & Kevin Rodriguez	January 30, 2019	102	0.435
Marcus becomes involved with the pranks and hazings between the two school cliques, the Legacies and Rats. Master Lin realizes that he is struggling with conflicted feelings about Denke's attempt to escape the academy.
4	"Mirror People"	Alexis Ostrander	Miles Orion Feldsott	February 6, 2019	103	0.516
Being caught and punished by Master Lin for the mischief that took place at the dance party, Marcus and the other students are forced to serve detention. After breaking into a locked weapons room out of boredom, Saya refers to her yakuza past when the school suffers a sudden massacre by members of the Kuroki Syndicate.
5	"Saudade"	Adam Kane	Rick Remender	February 13, 2019	104	0.416
Marcus, Saya, Maria, Willie, and Billy make a drug fueled trip to Las Vegas in an old convertible in order to kill Billy's father. All but Billy take acid, but Marcus takes seven times as much as the rest. Billy's father dies in an accident while fighting Marcus and Billy. Marcus encounters Chester in an elevator, but Chester feels he is not prepared to kill Marcus with enough showmanship so lets him go. Chico interrupts Marcus and Maria making out, severely beats up Marcus, and is killed by Maria.
6	"Stigmata Martyr"	Paco Cabezas	Maggie Bandur & Alex Ebel	February 20, 2019	105	0.365
The group's attempts to cover up their involvement in Chico's death are jeopardized by Maria's bipolar behavior. Master Lin and his sister Madame Gao clash over the proper way to run the academy. Chester prepares to make his debut as a serial killer, and sets the stage for a confrontation with Marcus.
7	"Rise Above"	Anthony Leonardi	Dave Anthony & Hilliard Guess	February 27, 2019	106	0.355
Marcus reveals Chester's threat and their shared history to Saya. He, along with Billy, help Marcus track down Chester. Maria is forced by Chico's family to go after a suspect in his disappearance. Willie bonds with his girlfriend. Gao discovers Master Lin's most closely guarded secret.
8	"The Clampdown"	Ami Canaan Mann	Rayna McClendon	March 6, 2019	107	0.372
Lin institutes a lockdown until he can determine who killed Chico and Yukio. Tensions boil over between the Kuroki and Soto Vatos, with Saya and Maria caught in the middle. Meanwhile, some of the students begin exploring an alliance with Gao.
9	"Kids of the Black Hole"	Wayne Yip	Rick Remender & Miles Orion Feldsott	March 13, 2019	108	0.368
Marcus and his friends prepare to take the battle to Chester, and Marcus separately tries to balance his feelings for Saya and Maria. Saya is forced to choose between her duties to Master Lin and her love for Marcus. Willie's loyalty to his friends is tested by his pacifist ideals. Lin implements his plan to deal with Gao, but she proves to be one step ahead of him.
10	"Sink With California"	Adam Kane	Rick Remender	March 20, 2019	109	0.340
Marcus and his friends invade Chester's hideout and enter into a pitched battle with his family. Elsewhere, Master Lin works frantically to keep his daughter alive and stay ahead of El Alma Del Diablo's forces.

== Production ==
Promotional poster

Principal casting for the pilot of the series was released by Syfy in November 2017, with Benedict Wong, Benjamin Wadsworth, Lana Condor, María Gabriela de Faría, Luke Tennie, Liam James, and Michel Duval announced as the pilot's leads. It was picked up to series by Syfy on April 18, 2018, for a planned 2019 debut.

The visual effects for the series, including the Las Vegas sequence in Episode 5, were created by FuseFX, CVDVFX, Zoic, and One. Six One Eight. Nathan Matthew David composed the music.

== Reception ==
=== Critical response ===
On the review aggregation website Rotten Tomatoes, the series has an approval rating of 64% based on 36 reviews, with an average rating of 6.23/10. The website's critical consensus reads, "Despite well executed action and smart casting, Deadly Class struggles to meet the mark set by other spooky teen shows." Metacritic, which uses a weighted average, assigned a score of 58 out of 100 based on 13 critics, indicating "mixed or average reviews".

=== Ratings ===
Viewership and ratings per episode of Deadly Class
No.	Title	Air date	Rating (18–49)	Viewers (millions)	DVR (18–49)	DVR viewers (millions)	Total (18–49)	Total viewers (millions)
1	"Reagan Youth"	December 30, 2018	0.1	0.355	—N/a	—N/a	—N/a	—N/a
2	"Noise, Noise, Noise"	January 23, 2019	0.1	0.438	0.3	0.62	0.4	1.05
3	"Snake Pit"	January 30, 2019	0.2	0.435	0.2	0.69	0.4	1.13
4	"Mirror People"	February 6, 2019	0.2	0.516	0.2	0.55	0.4	1.06 (Note: Live +7 ratings were not available, so Live +3 ratings have been used instead.)
5	"Saudade"	February 13, 2019	0.1	0.416	0.3	0.64	0.4	1.06
6	"Stigmata Martyr"	February 20, 2019	0.1	0.365	0.3	0.58	0.4	0.95
7	"Rise Above"	February 27, 2019	0.1	0.355	0.3	0.54	0.4	0.90
8	"The Clampdown"	March 6, 2019	0.1	0.372	0.2	0.49	0.3	0.87
9	"Kids of the Black Hole"	March 13, 2019	0.1	0.368	0.3	0.54	0.4	0.91
10	"Sink With California"	March 20, 2019	0.1	0.340	0.2	0.49	0.3	0.83
