= Uncanny X-Force =

Comic book series from Marvel Comics

- Cover for Uncanny X-Force #1 (December 2010). Art by Esad Ribic.

Publication information
- Publisher: Marvel Comics
- Schedule: Monthly
- Format: Ongoing series
- Genre: Superhero
- Publication date: List: (vol. 1) December 2010 – February 2013 (vol. 2) March 2013 – March 2014
- No. of issues: List: (vol. 1): 37 (vol. 2): 17
- Main character(s): Wolverine; X-Force

Creative team
- Written by: List: (vol. 1) Rick Remender (vol. 2) Sam Humphries
- Penciller: List: (vol. 1) Jerome Opeña Greg Tocchini Phil Noto (vol. 2) Ron Garney Adrian Alphona Dalibor Talajic Phil Briones
- Inker: List: (vol. 2) Danny Miki
- Colorist: List: (vol. 1) Dean White Frank Martin (vol. 2) Marte Gracia David Curiel

Collected editions
- The Apocalypse Solution: ISBN 0-7851-4855-8
- Deathlok Nation: ISBN 0-7851-4857-4

Uncanny X-Force was a comic book ongoing series published by Marvel Comics. Created by writer Rick Remender and artist Jerome Opeña, the first volume of the series continued the story of Wolverine and his X-Force team from the series X-Force, vol. 3. The title was relaunched after issue #35 as part of the Marvel NOW! relaunch event, and the new volume features Psylocke and Storm leading a new team of "outcasts and scoundrels". The second volume was one of two X-Force ongoing titles, along with Cable and X-Force.

== Publication history ==
Uncanny X-Force, vol. 1, was launched in October 2010 to replace X-Force, vol. 3. This new series features members of the previous X-Force team, which was to have been shut down by X-Men leader Cyclops due to the existence of the team having been previously exposed and now operates without him knowing. Being led by Wolverine, the squad features new team members Psylocke, Fantomex, and Deadpool. According to Remender, "This is a group of characters that have had their souls stained by evil forces in the past, a common thread connecting them. They've already made the hard compromises in the past; they've all taken life."

The title had a three-issue "Fear Itself" tie-in mini-series, written by Rob Williams, with art by Simone Bianchi.

The relaunched Uncanny X-Force is written by Sam Humphries and pencilled by Ron Garney, and features a Psylocke led team with an initial roster of Storm, Puck, Cluster, and Spiral.

As part of the "All-New Marvel NOW!" campaign, a new volume of X-Force was launched in February 2014, replacing Cable and X-Force and Uncanny X-Force vol.2. It was written by X-Men: Legacy author Simon Spurrier and illustrated by Rock-He Kim and Jorge Molina. It features a team of Cable, Psylocke, Fantomex and Marrow.

== Plot summary ==
=== Volume 1 ===
==== The Apocalypse Solution ====
The first mission of the new team is an assassination job to kill Apocalypse, reborn in the form of a child and being indoctrinated by Clan Akkaba on their Moon base. After defeating Apocalypse's Final Horsemen and getting to the young Apocalypse, no one on the team can summon up the courage to kill a child. When the group resigns to bring the child back with them and to reeducate him, Fantomex fires a shot in the child's head, killing him.

==== Deathlok Nation ====
Fantomex discovers there's something wrong with the World, as a presence calling itself Weapon Infinity has started manipulating the timestream within. Fantomex is attacked by a group of Deathlok cyborgs based on the Avengers who apparently want to kill him and take possession of the World. With the aid of a rogue Deathlok unit the team travels inside the World and faces Deathlok versions of themselves while Deadpool kills the architect of Weapon Infinity, the enigmatic Father, erasing the attacking Deathlok strain. The rogue Deathlok joins the team and Fantomex is revealed to be growing a clone of the child Apocalypse inside the World, unbeknownst to the rest of the team, watched over by Ultimaton.

==== The Dark Angel Saga ====
Warren's "Archangel" persona continues to grow stronger, leading X-Force to seek advice from Dark Beast, a former servant of Apocalypse. Dark Beast proposes that the team accompany him back to his lab in the alternate Age of Apocalypse universe (Earth-295), where he can retrieve a "seed of life" to counteract the "seed of death" that is driving Warren mad. Once they reach Earth-295, Dark Beast betrays them and cuts them off from their universe, leading X-Force to seek the help of the AoA's X-Men. They eventually acquire a new Life Seed and use Gateway to return home but discover they are too late as Archangel has completely overtaken Warren. Using the Life Seed to fuel the World, Archangel plans to extinguish all life on Earth and reset evolution, enlisting Ozymandias, Dark Beast, the Final Horsemen, Autumn Rolfson and her son Genocide, as well as the AoA Iceman and Blob in his army. X-Force is initially outmatched until the timely arrival of the AoA X-Men evens the odds, while Fantomex reluctantly releases the young clone of Apocalypse to fight Archangel. Although the clone (now calling himself "Genesis") is unable to defeat him, the fight gives Psylocke an opening to stab Archangel with the Life Seed, killing him. Angel later appears, seemingly fine, but it soon becomes clear the Life Seed removed any trace of both Archangel and Warren inside him. Wolverine sends Genesis and Angel to the Jean Grey School for Higher Learning.

==== Otherworld ====
Fantomex is abducted by Captain Britain and the Captain Britain Corps to be put on trial in Otherworld for his murder of the Apocalypse child. Psylocke is also abducted. Wolverine, Deadpool and the Age of Apocalypse version of Nightcrawler attempt to rescue them both but land in the middle of a battle against a demon which wishes to access the base of the Captain Britain Corps so that it can spread its influence across the multiverse. When Fantomex is sentenced to death, Psylocke saves him and betrays her brothers. However they are then ambushed by the Skinless Man, who seeks vengeance against Fantomex after he was flayed alive due to Fantomex's thieving. He cuts off Fantomex's face but is stopped by Psylocke; eventually it is revealed that the demon is a future incarnation of Jamie Braddock. Captain Britain is unable to kill his brother, so Psylocke possess him and kills Jamie to prevent his demonic ascension.

==== Final Execution ====
When Daken returns from the dead, he plots to destroy X-Force by creating a new incarnation of the Brotherhood of Mutants with Mystique, Sabretooth, the Skinless Man, Blob, Shadow King, and the Omega Clan.

In their first attack, they capture Genesis (Evan Sabahnur) to train him to become the new Apocalypse. They then ambush X-Force, the Skinless Man kills Fantomex by tearing his heart out, destroys Cavern X, and kills Gateway. As his last act, Gateway saves X-Force by teleporting them to a dystopian world ruled by X-Force, who kill innocents who have a possibility of becoming criminals.

Horrified, Psylocke attempts seppuku but is saved by the future version of herself. Upon X-Force's return to the present, they capture Mystique and argue over whether or not to kill Evan. During the commotion, Deadpool infiltrates the Brotherhood's base to try rescuing Evan but is stopped by Daken, the Blob and Omega Black; he is then brought in front of Evan and tortured by Omega Black.

Meanwhile, Nightcrawler betrays X-Force to get his revenge on Blob; he incapacitates EVA (now sentient after Fantomex's death) and Wolverine. Nightcrawler kills Blob by teleporting a shark inside of him and letting it eat him from the inside out. Following this, he is confronted by EVA for his betrayal.

Shadow King shatters Psylocke's mind after she refused to kill him but trapping him in the empty shell of Omega White instead. Daken tries to drown his father (the only way of killing someone with a healing factor) but Wolverine is saved by Deadpool. Deadpool tells him to stop Evan, who has donned the Apocalypse armor and is running rampant.

Evan nearly kills Mystique and the Skinless Man; in retaliation for his brutal murder of Fantomex, Deadpool kills the Skinless Man. Mystique is saved by Nightcrawler, and Wolverine is forced to confront Daken as Sabretooth escapes. In the battle, he ends up drowning Daken because of a message given to him by the dystopian future version of himself – that Daken will kill the students if he is allowed to live.

In the end, Deadpool tells Evan that to him, Evan is a symbol that anyone, no matter who they are, can be redeemed. X-Force helps AoA Nightcrawler assassinate AoA Iceman. Wolverine and Betsy, with EVA, head to a meeting with Deadpool, who has improperly programmed a duplication machine to bring Fantomex back to life. Because Fantomex had three brains, he is resurrected as three different people: Weapon XIII, an evil version of himself; Fantomex, a mischievous but good version of himself; and Cluster, a good, female version of himself. Psylocke pursues a relationship with Fantomex at the end of the story.

=== Volume 2 ===
==== Let It Bleed ====
Cover for Uncanny X-Force, vol. 2, #1 (March 2013). Art by Olivier Coipel and Laura Martin

Psylocke is expelled from Wolverine's School, so she and Storm go on a mission with Puck to hunt down Spiral, who is a drug dealer. It turns out Spiral is not selling drugs, but just using a new telepathic mutant named Ginny to make people think they are high. Bishop returns from the future possessed by the White Owl Demon and hunts Ginny. Storm and Psylocke attempt to cure Bishop, but the demon possesses Ginny. Weapon XIII kidnaps Fantomex, so Cluster seeks help from Psylocke.

==== Torn and Frayed ====
Pyslocke and Cluster travel to Madripoor to hunt Weapon XIII. Weapon XIII uses his power of misdirection (which Fantomex and Cluster not longer possess) to confess his love to Psylocke. She agrees to stay with him only if he allows her to kill Fantomex, who betrayed her during a heist at the Louvre. During a heated battle she decides to free Fantomex and stun Weapon XIII, stating that she is done with all three of them. Psylocke then rehabilitates Bishop, but they are attacked by the White Owl. Storm, Puck, and Psylocke are captured and have revenants, or evil clones, made of them. Bishop is eventually able to free them and are confronted by Spiral, who explains that she is trying to save Ginny and wants X-Force to help her. Bishop also realizes that the White Owl is actually Cassandra Nova.

==== The Great Corruption ====
The White Owl unleashes the revenants upon Earth after sacrificing a telepath named Philip. The White Owl can only be stopped by the death of a telepath, so she kidnaps Psylocke. The White Owl revives a revenant based on Psylocke original body before she transformed into her Japanese body. X-Force eventually overcomes the revenants and Psylocke sacrifices her revenant in order to stop the White Owl.

Later the team breaks up since Bishop is upset that Storm erased several of his memories. Hope Summers, who is with Cable's X-Force team, tracks him and tries to kill him. Cable attempts to stop the battle but is kidnapped by his evil clone Stryfe, who unlike Cable is still an Omega-level telepath. The two X-Force teams initially clash, but reconcile. They build a tracking device, then track down Cable and defeat Stryfe. Storm returns the X-Mansion and the two teams combine.

== Roster ==
=== Volume 1 ===
Issues	Year	Characters
#1–6	2010	Archangel, Deadpool, E.V.A., Fantomex, Psylocke, Wolverine
#7–10	2011	Archangel, Deadpool, Deathlok, E.V.A., Fantomex, Psylocke, Wolverine
#11–18	2011	Deadpool, Deathlok, E.V.A., Fantomex, Psylocke, Wolverine
#19–27	2011–2012	Deadpool, Deathlok, E.V.A., Fantomex, AoA Nightcrawler, Psylocke, Wolverine
#28–32	2012	Deadpool, Deathlok, E.V.A., AoA Nightcrawler, Psylocke, Wolverine
#33–34	2012	Deadpool, Deathlok, E.V.A., Psylocke, Wolverine
#35	2012	Cluster, Deadpool, Deathlok, E.V.A., Fantomex, Psylocke, Wolverine

=== Volume 2 ===
Issues	Year	Characters
#1–17	2013-2014	Bishop, Psylocke, Puck, Spiral, Storm

== Creators ==
=== Writers ===
- Rick Remender: Uncanny X-Force vol. 1 #1–35 (October 2010–December 2012)
- Sam Humphries: Uncanny X-Force vol. 2 #1–17 (January 2013–February 2014)

=== Art ===
- Jerome Opeña: Uncanny X-Force vol. 1 #1–4, #14–18 (October 2010–January 2011, August–December 2011)
- Esad Ribic: Uncanny X-Force vol. 1 #5–7 (February–April 2011)
- Rafael Albuquerque: Uncanny X-Force vol. 1 #5.1 (March 2011)
- Billy Tan: Uncanny X-Force vol.1 #8–10, 19.1 (April–May 2011, March 2012)
- Mark Brooks: Uncanny X-Force vol. 1 #11–13 (June–August 2011)
- Greg Tocchini: Uncanny X-Force vol. 1 #20–23 (March 2012–June 2012)
- Phil Noto: Uncanny X-Force vol. 1 #24, 26–27, 31–34
- Ron Garney: Uncanny X-Force vol. 2 #1–17 (January 2013–February 2014)

=== Cover art ===
- Esad Ribic: Uncanny X-Force, vol. 1 #1–18 (October 2010–December 2011)

== Collected editions ==
=== Volume 1 ===
Title	Material collected	Publication Date	ISBN
Uncanny X-Force Volume 1: Apocalypse Solution	Uncanny X-Force #1–4, material from Wolverine: Road to Hell	May 2011	0-7851-4854-X
Uncanny X-Force Volume 2: Deathlok Nation	Uncanny X-Force #5–7, 5.1, Astonishing Tales (vol. 1) #25	June 2011	0-7851-4856-6
Uncanny X-Force Volume 3: The Dark Angel Saga Book 1	Uncanny X-Force #8–13	November 2011	0-7851-4660-1
Uncanny X-Force Volume 4: The Dark Angel Saga Book 2	Uncanny X-Force #14–19	March 2012	0-7851-5887-1
Fear Itself: Uncanny X-Force/The Deep	Fear Itself: Uncanny X-Force #1–3, Fear Itself: The Deep #1–4	April 2012	0-7851-5796-4
Uncanny X-Force Volume 5: Otherworld	Uncanny X-Force #20-24	June 2012	0-7851-6181-3
Uncanny X-Force Volume 6: Final Execution Book 1	Uncanny X-Force #25-29	November 2012	0-7851-6183-X
Uncanny X-Force Volume 7: Final Execution Book 2	Uncanny X-Force #30-35, material from Wolverine: Dangerous Games #1, Deadpool #1000	February 2013	0-7851-6185-6
Uncanny X-Force by Rick Remender: The Complete Collection Volume 1	Uncanny X-Force #1-19, 5.1, Wolverine: Road to Hell #1, All-New Wolverine Saga; X-Men Spotlight	August 2014	978-0785188230
Uncanny X-Force by Rick Remender: The Complete Collection Volume 2	Uncanny X-Force #20-35, 19.1	December 2014	978-0785188247
Uncanny X-Force by Rick Remender Omnibus	Uncanny X-Force #1-35, 5.1, 19.1, Wolverine: Road to Hell #1, All-New Wolverine Saga; X-Men Spotlight	March 2014	978-0785185710

=== Volume 2 ===
Title	Material collected	Publication Date	ISBN
Uncanny X-Force Volume 1: Let it Bleed	Uncanny X-Force (vol. 2) #1-6	July 2013	978-0785167396
Uncanny X-Force Volume 2: Torn and Frayed	Uncanny X-Force (vol. 2) #7-12	December 2013	978-0785167402
Uncanny X-Force Volume 3: The Great Corruption	Uncanny X-Force (vol. 2) #13-17, Cable and X-Force #18-19	April 2014	978-0785189855
