= 1 Month 2 Live =

Comic book by Marvel Comics

One Month to Live, also called 1 Month 2 Live, is a 5-issue limited series comic book produced by Marvel Comics on a weekly basis in 2010. It was written by Rick Remender in collaboration with Stuart Moore, John Ostrander, and Rob Williams. The concept was devised by Marvel editor Steve Wacker with the premise "What would you do with one month to change the world?" The storyline centers on a protagonist with terminal cancer, in response to Wacker's aunt having been diagnosed with cancer.

The four writers found the experience of writing the story to be especially poignant, as all had personal experiences with cancer—in particular, Remender, whose father survived a bout with cancer in 2008, and Ostrander, whose wife Kim Yale died of cancer in 1997.

== Plot ==
In an accident with toxic waste, banker Dennis Sykes gains superpowers and an untreatable cancer. With a life expectancy of barely a month, Sykes launches himself on a brief career as a superhero, in an attempt to make a difference in the world while he still can, assisting the Fantastic Four in saving Ego the Living Planet from a cancerous infection and averting Hammerhead's attempt to take control of his neighborhood. Although use of his powers made his condition worse, Sykes makes a positive impression on many heroes with his dedication to doing the right thing, accepting training from Spider-Man and receiving honorary membership with the FF and the Avengers before he finally dies of stress from his final battle.

== Critical response ==
USA Today called the story "nuanced and moving". IGN described it as "one of the most human stories that Marvel has published in a long time", and commended Marvel for not devising "some magical cure for Dennis' cancer"; however, Comic Book Resources stated that it was "ambitious but flawed".
