= Low (comics) =

Science fiction comics series

- Cover of Low #1

Publication information
- Publisher: Image Comics
- Schedule: Monthly; complete
- Format: Ongoing series
- Genre: Post-apocalyptic
- Publication date: July 2014 – December 2020
- No. of issues: 26

Creative team
- Written by: Rick Remender
- Artist: Greg Tocchini
- Colorist(s): Greg Tocchini (#1–7); Dave McCaig (#8–26)

Low is an American After the End science fiction comics series written by Rick Remender and drawn by Greg Tocchini. Low was published from July 2014 to December 2020 by Image Comics, for a total of 26 issues.

The series is set billions of years in the future of the Earth after the start of the Sun's expansion into a red giant has made the surface uninhabitable. It follows the lives of the two million survivors in the underwater city of Salus; its helmsmen, the Caine family; and its pirate enemies. The protagonists of the first issues are Stel Caine, who searches for life-supporting planets with robotic probes, her husband Johl, and their children. Remender summarized the story as being about "one woman's optimism in the face of inevitable and true doom".

The first issues of the series received critical praise. In Paste magazine, Robert Tutton wrote of the "primal, silent awe" inspired by Tocchini's "surreal" and "dazzling" art. In IGN, Tres Dean noted the creators' "complex and intriguing worldbuilding and precise, emotional character work", as well as Tocchini's "impeccable and breathtaking" art.

== Collected editions ==
Title	Material collected	Publication date	ISBN
Vol. 1: The Delirium of Hope	Low #1–6	March 2015	978-1-63215-194-0
Vol. 2: Before the Dawn Burns Us	Low #7–10	November 2015	978-1-63215-469-9
Vol. 3: Shore Of The Dying Light	Low #11–15	October 2016	978-1-63215-708-9
Vol. 4: Outer Aspects of Inner Attitudes	Low #16–19	September 2017	978-1-5343-0229-7
Vol. 5: Light Brings Light	Low #20–26	January 2021	978-1-5343-0504-5
Low: Book One	Low #1–15	October 2017	978-1-5343-0243-3
Low: Book Two	Low #16–26	August 2021	978-1-5343-1920-2
Low: Compendium	Low #1–26	August 2023	978-1-5343-9857-3

== See also ==
- List of underwater science fiction works
