= Rick Remender =

America comic writer

- Remender in 2025
- Born: February 6, 1973 (age 53)
- Areas: Writer, Artist
- Notable works: Fear Agent; Uncanny X-Force; Uncanny Avengers; Captain America; Black Science; Low; Deadly Class; Tokyo Ghost

Rick Remender (born February 6, 1973) is an American animator, comic book writer and television producer who resides in Los Angeles, California. As a comic book creator, he is best known for his work on Uncanny X-Force, Venom, Captain America and Uncanny Avengers, published by Marvel, as well as his creator-owned series Fear Agent, Deadly Class, Black Science and Low, published by Image. In video games, he wrote EA's Dead Space and Epic Games' Bulletstorm.

In 2019, Sony Pictures Television adapted Deadly Class into a television series of the same name, for which Remender served as a showrunner and lead writer.

== Career ==
Remender started out in animation, working on such films as The Iron Giant, Anastasia, Titan A.E. and The Adventures of Rocky and Bullwinkle. In 1998, he teamed up with fellow animator Harper Jaten to create the absurdist humor series Captain Dingleberry, which, after four issues of self-publishing, was picked up by SLG Publishing. Remender contributed several short strips to Kieron Dwyer's anthology series Lowest Comic Denominator, and the pair went on to co-create Black Heart Billy, again published by SLG Publishing. Black Heart Billy was canceled after two issues in 2000 and collected/finished by AiT/PlanetLar in 2002 to coincide with the release of Remender's first solo writing work, the graphic novel Doll and Creature.

Remender continued working in animation, co-creating and directing the Flash animated series Swing Town for Wild Brain Animation. His other work of the period includes inking assignments for Marvel's The Avengers, art for several issues of Tales of the Teenage Mutant Ninja Turtles and the comic book adaptation of Bruce Campbell's Man with the Screaming Brain as well as short comics and album covers for Fat Wreck Chords, a Bay Area punk label. During this time, he also taught comics, animation and storyboarding at the Academy of Art University. In 2005, Remender began working primarily with Image, launching several creator-owned titles such as Sea of Red, Strange Girl and Fear Agent. Later work for Image includes horror series Sorrow, co-written with Seth Peck, and Crawl Space, an anthology series for various works by Remender and his long-time collaborator Kieron Dwyer that was discontinued after its initial storyline XXXombies.

In 2007, Remender moved Fear Agent to Dark Horse and launched two new creator-owned titles at the publisher, the superhero series The End League and the giant robot series Gigantic. At the same time, Remender began working for Marvel as a writer, joining Matt Fraction on Punisher War Journal and staying with the character to launch the new volume that tied in to the status quo resulting from the events of the 2008-09 "Dark Reign" storyline. In April 2009, Remender signed an exclusive contract with Marvel, though it allowed him to release The Last Days of American Crime through Radical. Further work for Marvel includes Uncanny X-Force and a Captain America volume that featured the storyline where Falcon took over the mantle of Captain America, which was adapted for Avengers: Endgame and The Falcon and the Winter Soldier.

Remender served as a writer on the Electronic Arts video game Dead Space, and was the lead writer for Epic Games' Bulletstorm, released on February 22, 2011. In 2013, he returned to Image, producing a slate of creator-owned titles such as Black Science with Matteo Scalera, Deadly Class with Wes Craig, Low with Greg Tocchini, Tokyo Ghost with Sean Gordon Murphy, Seven to Eternity with Jerome Opeña and Death or Glory with Bengal. In 2017, Remender launched his own imprint at Image, titled Giant Generator, as well as a production company of the same name.

In addition to his work in comics and video games, Remender served as the showrunner on the Sony Pictures Television adaptation of his series Deadly Class which aired on Syfy, but was canceled after one season.

In 2019, The Last Days of American Crime was adapted into a feature film for Netflix. It is one of the rare movies to receive a 0% rating on Rotten Tomatoes.

In September 2023, it was announced that Remender, through his Giant Generator production company, had signed a three-year exclusivity deal with Image Comics. In October 2023, it was announced that Giant Generator had signed exclusivity deals with 12 high profile artists including Daniel Acuña, André Lima Araújo, Paul Azaceta, Bengal, Roland Boschi, Max Fiumara, Mike Hawthorne, J. G. Jones, Francesco Mobili, Brett Parson, and Yanick Paquette. It was also announced that the imprint would be working on 3 new titles set to release in 2024 including Grommets by Remender, Brian Posehn, and Brett Parson, Napalm Lullaby by Remender and Bengal, and Dust to Dust by Jones and Phil Bram.

In November 2023, the first issue of Holy Roller, a comic written by Remeder, Joe Trohman, Andy Samberg, and illustrated by Roland Boschi, was released and published by Image Comics. Holy Roller about a pro bowler who is forced to quit his dream job and return to his hometown, which he soon discovers has been overrun by Neo-Nazis, leading him to become a trick bowling ball-wielding Jewish superhero.

In October 2024, it was announced that Giant Generator had added Steve Epting, Zeb Wells, and Kalman Andrasofszky to its creator line-up, with each creator working on books that would be announced in 2025.

== Personal life ==
Remender resides in Los Angeles with his wife and two children.

== Bibliography ==
=== Early work ===
- Captain Dingleberry (co-written and drawn by Remender and Harper Jaten):
  - Sideshow (collection of short stories led by "Captain Dingleberry vs. the Sensitive Artist", self-published as Underhanded Comics, 1997)
  - Captain Dingleberry #1–6 (1998–1999) collected as Captain Dingleberry Unplugged (tpb, 144 pages, 1999, ISBN 0-943151-17-1)
    - Issues #1–4 are self-published as Underhanded Comics; #5–6 and the collection are published by SLG Publishing.
  - Captain Dingleberry Sooper Spooky Goth Special (with additional art by Rory Hensley, SLG Publishing, 2000)
- Murder Can Be Fun #12: "The Ride of Your Life!" (script and art, anthology, SLG Publishing, 1999)
- Lowest Comic Denominator (short strips written and drawn by Remender for Kieron Dwyer's anthology):
  - Issue #0 (1999) featured "Hicama!" and "Todd the Really Spooky Goth"
  - Issue #1 (2000) featured "Dillrod the Face Fucker" and another installment of "Hicama!"
  - Issue #2 (2001) featured the third installment of "Hicama!" and "Spertz" (written by Harper Jaten)
- Black Heart Billy (tpb, 120 pages, IDW Publishing, 2008, ISBN 1-60010-317-0) collects:
  - Black Heart Billy #1–2 (co-written by Remender and Kieron Dwyer, art by Dwyer, SLG Publishing, 2000) also collected as Black Heart Billy (tpb, 96 pages, AiT/Planet Lar, 2002, ISBN 1-932051-02-3)
  - Lowest Comic Denominator #3: "Sac, Warrior of Choad" (co-written by Remender and Kieron Dwyer, art by Dwyer, anthology, 2002)
  - Fat Wreck Chords: Catalog, Comics, Zine #2: "My Heart Bill Go On" (script and art — co-written with Kieron Dwyer and Fat Mike, co-feature in the Fat Wreck Chords catalog, 2002)
  - More Fund Comics: An All-Star Benefit Comic for the CBLDF: "Anti-Fashion" (script and art — co-written with Kieron Dwyer, anthology graphic novel, 144 pages, Sky Dog, 2003, ISBN 0-9721831-2-4)
  - 24Seven Volume 1: "I Love Living in the City" (with Paul Azaceta, anthology graphic novel, 224 pages, Image, 2006, ISBN 1-58240-636-7)
- Doll and Creature (with John Heebink, graphic novel, 104 pages, AiT/Planet Lar, 2002, ISBN 1-932051-04-X)
  - A colorized and slightly rewritten version of the story with a new epilogue (drawn by Scott Cohn) was published as Doll and Creature #1–4 (Image, 2006)
  - The new version was subsequently collected by Image as Doll and Creature: Everything Turns Gray (tpb, 104 pages, 2006, ISBN 1-58240-655-3)
- Night Mary #1–5 (co-written by Remender and Kieron Dwyer, art by Dwyer, IDW Publishing, 2005)
  - Collected as Night Mary (tpb, 120 pages, 2005, ISBN 1-933239-27-1)
  - Collected in Crawl Space Omnibus (hc, 616 pages, Image, 2014, ISBN 1-60706-940-7)

==== As inker ====
On Kieron Dwyer:

- Avengers: The Ultron Imperative (two-page pin-up in the one-shot, Marvel, 2001)
- The Avengers vol. 3 #48–50, 53–54, 57–60 (written by Kurt Busiek and Geoff Johns (#57–60), Marvel, 2001–2002)

On Mike Hawthorne:

- Terminator 3 #3–4 (written by Miles Gunter, Beckett Comics, 2003)
- Ruule|Ruule: Ganglords of Chinatown #1–5 (written by Ivan Brandon, Beckett Comics, 2003–2004)

==== As penciller ====
- Tales of the Teenage Mutant Ninja Turtles vol. 2 (written by Stephen Murphy, anthology, Mirage):
  - "The Worms of Madness" (plot by Remender and Murphy, in #3–4, 2004) collected in Tales of the Teenage Mutant Ninja Turtles Volume 3 (tpb, 120 pages, IDW Publishing, 2013, ISBN 1-61377-762-0)
  - "Loops" (plot by Remender, Murphy and Peter Laird, in #13–14, 2004) collected in Tales of the Teenage Mutant Ninja Turtles Volume 6 (tpb, 128 pages, IDW Publishing, 2014, ISBN 1-63140-163-7)
- Man with the Screaming Brain #1–4 (co-written by Bruce Campbell and David Goodman, Dark Horse, 2005) collected as Man with the Screaming Brain (tpb, 104 pages, 2005, ISBN 1-59307-397-6)
- The Last Christmas #1–5 (co-written by Brian Posehn and Gerry Duggan, Image, 2006) collected as The Last Christmas (tpb, 176 pages, 2006, ISBN 1-58240-676-6; hc, 2013, ISBN 1-60706-821-4)

=== Image Comics ===
- Crawl Space Omnibus (hc, 616 pages, 2014, ISBN 1-60706-940-7) includes:
  - Sea of Red (co-written by Remender and Kieron Dwyer, art by Salgood Sam (#1–4) and Paul Harmon, 2005–2006) also collected as:
    - No Grave but the Sea (collects #1–4, tpb, 104 pages, 2005, ISBN 1-58240-537-9)
    - No Quarter (collects #5–8, tpb, 104 pages, 2006, ISBN 1-58240-541-7)
    - The Deadlights (collects #9–13, tpb, 120 pages, 2007, ISBN 1-58240-666-9)
  - Sorrow #1–4 (co-written by Remender and Seth Peck, art by Francesco Francavilla, 2007–2008) also collected as Sorrow (tpb, 96 pages, 2008, ISBN 1-58240-875-0)
  - Crawl Space: XXXombies #1–4 (co-written by Remender and Tony Moore, art by Kieron Dwyer, 2007–2008) also collected as Crawl Space: XXXombies (tpb, 96 pages, 2008, ISBN 1-58240-913-7)
  - Frank Frazetta's Creatures (with Peter Bergting, one-shot, 2008) also collected in The Fantastic Worlds of Frank Frazetta Volume 1 (hc, 176 pages, 2008, ISBN 1-60706-009-4; tpb, 2009, ISBN 1-60706-138-4)
- Strange Girl (with Eric Nguyen, Harper Jaten (#7), Jerome Opeña (#8), Nick Stakal (#10–12, 14–15), Micah Farritor (#13 and 15) and Peter Bergting (#16–18), 2005–2008) collected as:
  - Girl Afraid (collects #1–4, tpb, 104 pages, 2005, ISBN 1-58240-543-3)
  - Heaven Knows I'm Miserable Now (collects #5–9, tpb, 128 pages, 2006, ISBN 1-58240-642-1)
  - Paint a Vulgar Picture (collects #10–15, tpb, 142 pages, 2007, ISBN 1-58240-687-1)
  - Golden Lights (collects #16–18, tpb, 96 pages, 2008, ISBN 1-58240-877-7)
  - Omnibus (collects #1–18, hc, 480 pages, 2011, ISBN 1-60706-397-2; tpb, 2015, ISBN 1-63215-535-4)
- Fear Agent (with Tony Moore, Jerome Opeña, Francesco Francavilla (#11), Kieron Dwyer (#20–21) and Mike Hawthorne (#28–32), published by Image in 2005–2007 and Dark Horse in 2007–2011) collected as:
  - Library Edition Volume 1 (includes #1–11, hc, 440 pages, Dark Horse, 2012, ISBN 1-61655-005-8)
    - Also collects the 4-issue limited series Fear Agent: The Last Goodbye (written by Remender, art by Tony Moore, 2007) published instead of issues #12–15 after the series was moved to Dark Horse.
    - Also collects the Tales of the Fear Agent: Twelve Steps in One one-shot (written by Remender, art by Eric Nguyen, 2007) published instead of issue #16 after the series was moved to Dark Horse.
    - Also collects the "Nothing to Fear..." short serial (art by Kieron Dwyer) from MySpace Dark Horse Presents #3–4 (anthology, 2007)
  - Library Edition Volume 2 (collects #17–32, hc, 520 pages, Dark Horse, 2014, ISBN 1-61655-103-8)
  - The Final Edition Volume 1 (collects #1–10, tpb, 256 pages, 2018, ISBN 1-5343-0797-4)
  - The Final Edition Volume 2 (collects #17–21 and Fear Agent: The Last Goodbye #1–4, tpb, 240 pages, 2018, ISBN 1-5343-0824-5)
  - The Final Edition Volume 3 (collects #22–32, tpb, 256 pages, 2018, ISBN 1-5343-0826-1)
  - The Final Edition Volume 4 (includes #11, Tales of the Fear Agent: Twelve Steps in One and MySpace Dark Horse Presents #3–4, tpb, 248 pages, 2018, ISBN 1-5343-0875-X)
- Put the Book Back on the Shelf: "Nice Day for a Sulk" (with John Heebink, anthology graphic novel, 144 pages, 2006, ISBN 1-58240-600-6)
- Popgun Volume 1: "The Death of the Midnight Sky" (with Josh Hoye, anthology graphic novel, 455 pages, 2007, ISBN 1-58240-824-6)
- Black Science (with Matteo Scalera, 2013–2019) collected as:
  - The Beginner's Guide to Entropy (collects #1–16, hc, 432 pages, 2016, ISBN 1-63215-493-5)
  - Transcendentalism (collects #17–30, hc, 400 pages, 2017, ISBN 1-5343-0344-8)
  - A Brief Moment of Clarity (collects #31–43, hc, 424 pages, 2020, ISBN 1-5343-1582-9)
  - Compendium (collects #1–43, tpb, 1,104 pages, 2023, ISBN 1-5343-9959-3)
- Deadly Class (with Wes Craig, 2014–2022) collected as:
  - Noise Noise Noise (collects #1–16, hc, 440 pages, 2016, ISBN 1-63215-664-4)
  - The Funeral Party (collects #17–31, hc, 424 pages, 2018, ISBN 1-5343-0841-5)
  - Teen Age Riot (collects #32–44 and the Free Comic Book Day 2019: Deadly Class special, hc, 352 pages, 2022, ISBN 1-5343-2199-3)
  - Kids Will Be Skeletons (collects #45–56, hc, 392 pages, 2023, ISBN 1-5343-2605-7)
- Low (with Greg Tocchini, 2014–2021) collected as:
  - Book One (collects #1–15, hc, 440 pages, 2017, ISBN 1-5343-0243-3)
  - Book Two (collects #16–26, hc, 352 pages, 2021, ISBN 1-5343-1920-4)
- Tokyo Ghost #1–10 (with Sean Gordon Murphy, 2015–2016) collected as Tokyo Ghost (hc, 272 pages, 2017, ISBN 1-5343-0046-5)
- Thought Bubble Anthology #5: "Nancy Boy" (with Farel Dalrymple, 2015) collected in Thought Bubble Anthology Collection (tpb, 136 pages, 2016, ISBN 1-5343-0067-8)
- Seven to Eternity #1–17 (with Jerome Opeña and James Harren (#7–8), 2016–2021) collected as Seven to Eternity (hc, 480 pages, 2022, ISBN 1-5343-1931-X)
- Death or Glory #1–11 (with Bengal, 2018–2020) collected as Death or Glory (hc, 336 pages, 2021, ISBN 1-5343-1888-7)
- The Scumbag #1-14 (with Lewis LaRosa (#1), Andrew Robinson (#2), Eric Powell (#3), Roland Boschi (#4, 11-14), Wes Craig (#5), Bengal (#6), Francesco Mobili (#7), Alex Riegel (#8), Jonathan Wayshak (#9), and Matías Bergara (#10), 2020–2022) collected as:
  - Volume 1: Cocainefinger (collects #1–5, tpb, 144 pages, 2021, ISBN 1-5343-1890-9)
  - Volume 2: Moonflower (collects #6–10, tpb, 152 pages, 2021, ISBN 1-5343-1925-5)
  - Volume 3: Goldenbrowneye (collects #11–14, tpb, 128 pages, 2022, ISBN 1-5343-2126-8)
- A Righteous Thirst for Vengeance #1-11 (with André Lima Araújo, 2021–2022) collected as:
  - Volume 1 (collects #1–5, tpb, 136 pages, 2022, ISBN 1-5343-2209-4)
  - Volume 2 (collects #6–11, tpb, 136 pages, 2022, ISBN 1-5343-2321-X)
- Napalm Lullaby #1-10 (with Bengal, 2023-2025) collected as:
  - Volume 1 (collects #1-6, tpb, 168 pages, 2025, ISBN 1-5343-2860-2)
- The Sacrificers #1-21 (with Max Fiumara, 2023-2026) collected as:
  - Volume 1 (collects #1-6, tpb, 192 pages, 2024, ISBN 1-5343-9789-2)
  - Volume 2 (collects #7-12, tpb, 192 pages, 2024, ISBN 1-5343-6681-4)
- Holy Roller #1-9 (co-written with Andy Samberg and Joe Trohman, art by Roland Boschi, 2023-2025)

=== Marvel Comics ===
- X-Men:
  - What If...? (featuring X-Men: Age of Apocalypse): "What If Legion Had Killed Xavier and Magneto?" (with Dave Wilkins, one-shot, 2007)
    - Collected in X-Men: The Age of Apocalypse Omnibus Companion (hc, 992 pages, 2014, ISBN 0-7851-8514-3)
    - Collected in X-Men: The Age of Apocalyse — Twilight (tpb, 432 pages, 2016, ISBN 0-7851-9344-8)
  - Wolverine: Dangerous Games: "Purity" (with Jerome Opeña, co-feature in one-shot, 2008) collected in Wolverine: Dangerous Games (hc, 144 pages, 2008, ISBN 0-7851-3471-9; tpb, 2009, ISBN 0-78513-472-7)
  - Deadpool vol. 2 #1000: "Appetite for Destruction" (with Jerome Opeña, co-feature, 2010) collected in Deadpool: Dead Head Redemption (tpb, 240 pages, 2011, ISBN 0-7851-5649-6)
  - Uncanny X-Force (with Jerome Opeña, Rafael Albuquerque (#5.1), Esad Ribić (#5–7), Billy Tan (#8–10, 19.1), Mark Brooks (#11–13), Robbi Rodriguez (#19), Greg Tocchini (#20–23), Phil Noto, Mike McKone (#25) and Julian Totino Tedesco (#28–29), 2010–2013) collected as:
    - Uncanny X-Force by Rick Remender: The Complete Collection Volume 1 (collects #1–5, 5.1, 6–19, tpb, 520 pages, 2014, ISBN 0-7851-8823-1)
      - Includes "The First Day of the Rest of Your Life" short story (art by Leonardo Manco) from Wolverine: Road to Hell (promotional one-shot, 2010)
    - Uncanny X-Force by Rick Remender: The Complete Collection Volume 2 (collects #19.1, 20–35 and the short stories from Wolverine: Dangerous Games and Deadpool vol. 2 #1000, tpb, 408 pages, 2015, ISBN 0-7851-8824-X)
    - Uncanny X-Force by Rick Remender Omnibus (collects #1–35, 5.1, 19.1 and the short story from Wolverine: Road to Hell, hc, 928 pages, 2014, ISBN 0-7851-8571-2)
- Punisher:
  - Punisher War Journal vol. 2 (co-written by Remender and Matt Fraction, art by Howard Chaykin, 2008–2009) collected as:
    - Jigsaw (collects #19–23, hc, 144 pages, 2008, ISBN 0-7851-3022-5; tpb, 2009, ISBN 0-7851-2964-2)
    - Secret Invasion (includes #24–25, hc, 120 pages, 2009, ISBN 0-7851-3148-5; tpb, 2009, ISBN 0-7851-3170-1)
  - The Punisher vol. 8 (with Jerome Opeña (#1–5), Tan Eng Huat (#6–10), Tony Moore, Dan Brereton (#14 and 21), Roland Boschi (#15 and 17) and Jefte Palo (#18), 2009–2010) collected as:
    - Dark Reign (collects #1–5, hc, 136 pages, 2009, ISBN 0-7851-3997-4; tpb, 2009, ISBN 0-7851-4069-7)
    - Dead End (collects #6–10 and Annual, hc, 168 pages, 2009, ISBN 0-7851-4278-9; tpb, 2010, ISBN 0-7851-4162-6)
    - Franken-Castle (collects #11–21, hc, 344 pages, 2010, ISBN 0-7851-4754-3; tpb, 2011, ISBN 0-7851-4420-X)
      - Includes the Dark Reign: The List—Punisher one-shot (written by Remender, art by John Romita, Jr., 2009)
    - The Punisher by Rick Remender Omnibus (collects #1–21, Dark Reign: The List—Punisher and Punisher: In the Blood #1–5, hc, 760 pages, 2012, ISBN 0-7851-6213-5)
  - Punisher: In the Blood #1–5 (with Roland Boschi, 2011) collected as Punisher: In the Blood (tpb, 120 pages, 2012, ISBN 0-7851-5181-8)
- Dark Reign: The Cabal: "Family Trust" (with Max Fiumara, anthology one-shot, 2009) collected in Dark Reign: The Hood (tpb, 136 pages, 2010, ISBN 0-7851-4163-4)
- Thunderbolts #137 (with Mahmud Asrar, 2009) collected in Thunderbolts: Widowmaker (hc, 136 pages, 2009, ISBN 0-7851-4006-9; tpb, 2010, ISBN 0-7851-4091-3)
- Brother Voodoo:
  - Doctor Voodoo: Avenger of the Supernatural #1–5 (with Jefte Palo, 2009–2010) collected as Doctor Voodoo: Avenger of the Supernatural (tpb, 208 pages, 2010, ISBN 0-7851-4409-9)
  - Age of Heroes #1: "A Date with the Doctor" (with Chris Samnee, anthology, 2010) collected in Age of Heroes (tpb, 104 pages, 2011, ISBN 0-7851-4724-1)
- Heroic Age: One Month to Live #1 (with Andrea Mutti) and #5 (with Jamie McKelvie, 2010) collected in Heroic Age: One Month to Live (hc, 128 pages, 2011, ISBN 0-7851-4903-1; tpb, 2011, ISBN 0-7851-4904-X)
- What If...? Demon in an Armor + What If...? Wolverine: Father + What If...? Spider-Man + What If...? Dark Reign: "What If Venom Possessed Deadpool?" (with Shawn Moll, co-feature in one-shots, 2011)
  - Collected in Venom by Rick Remender: The Complete Collection Volume 1 (tpb, 320 pages, 2015, ISBN 0-7851-9352-9)
  - Collected in Deadpool Classic: Ultimate Deadpool (tpb, 504 pages, 2018, ISBN 1-302-90766-2)
- Venom vol. 2 (with Tony Moore, Tom Fowler (#3, 5–8), Stefano Caselli (#9), Lan Medina, Kev Walker (#16–17) and Declan Shalvey (#22); issues #17–21 are co-written by Remender and Cullen Bunn, 2011–2012) collected as:
  - Venom by Rick Remender: The Complete Collection Volume 1 (collects #1–12, tpb, 320 pages, 2015, ISBN 0-7851-9352-9)
  - Venom by Rick Remender: The Complete Collection Volume 2 (collects #13, 13.1–13.4, 14–22, tpb, 344 pages, 2015, ISBN 0-7851-9353-7)
- Secret Avengers (with Patrick Zircher (#21.1), Gabriel Hardman (#22–25), Renato Guedes (#26–28), Matteo Scalera and Andy Kuhn (#33), 2012–2013) collected as:
  - Secret Avengers by Rick Remender Volume 1 (collects #21.1, 22–25, hc, 112 pages, 2012, ISBN 0-7851-6118-X; tpb, 2013, ISBN 0-7851-6119-8)
  - Secret Avengers by Rick Remender Volume 2 (collects #26–32, hc, 136 pages, 2012, ISBN 0-7851-6120-1; tpb, 2013, ISBN 0-7851-6121-X)
  - Secret Avengers by Rick Remender Volume 3 (collects #33–37, hc, 112 pages, 2013, ISBN 0-7851-6122-8; tpb, 2013, ISBN 0-7851-6123-6)
  - Secret Avengers by Rick Remender: The Complete Collection (collects #21.1 and 22–37, tpb, 384 pages, 2019, ISBN 1-302-91643-2)
- AvX: VS #4: "Daredevil vs. Psylocke" (with Brandon Peterson, anthology, 2012)
  - Collected in Avengers vs. X-Men (hc, 568 pages, 2012, ISBN 0-7851-6317-4)
  - Collected in Avengers vs. X-Men: VS (tpb, 160 pages, 2013, ISBN 0-7851-6520-7)
- Uncanny Avengers (with John Cassaday (#1–4), Olivier Coipel (#5), Daniel Acuña, Adam Kubert (#8.AU), Salvador Larroca (#12 and 24), Steve McNiven (#14–17) and Sanford Greene (#23); issue #8.AU is co-written by Remender and Gerry Duggan, 2012–2014) collected as:
  - The Red Shadow (collects #1–5, hc, 136 pages, 2013, ISBN 0-7851-6844-3; tpb, 2014, ISBN 0-7851-6603-3)
  - The Apocalypse Twins (collects #6–11 and 8.AU, hc, 160 pages, 2013, ISBN 0-7851-6845-1; tpb, 2014, ISBN 0-7851-6604-1)
  - Ragnarok Now (collects #12–17, hc, 136 pages, 2014, ISBN 0-7851-8483-X; tpb, 2014, ISBN 0-7851-8484-8)
  - Avenge the Earth (collects #18–22, hc, 136 pages, 2014, ISBN 0-7851-5423-X; tpb, 2015, ISBN 0-7851-5424-8)
  - AXIS Prelude (collects #23–25 and Annual, hc, 144 pages, 2015, ISBN 0-7851-5425-6; tpb, 2015, ISBN 0-7851-5426-4)
  - Omnibus (collects #1–25, 8.AU and Annual, hc, 672 pages, 2015, ISBN 0-7851-9394-4)
- Captain America by Rick Remender Omnibus (hc, 1,080 pages, 2021, ISBN 1-302-93047-8) collects:
  - Captain America vol. 7 (with John Romita, Jr., Carlos Pacheco, Nic Klein (#13, 17–21), Pascal Alixe (#16) and Stuart Immonen (#25), 2013–2014) also collected as:
    - Castaway in Dimension Z Book One (collects #1–5, hc, 136 pages, 2013, ISBN 0-7851-6826-5; tpb, 2014, ISBN 0-7851-6655-6)
    - Castaway in Dimension Z Book Two (collects #6–10, hc, 136 pages, 2013, ISBN 0-7851-6827-3; tpb, 2014, ISBN 0-7851-6656-4)
    - Loose Nuke (collects #11–15, hc, 136 pages, 2014, ISBN 0-7851-8951-3; tpb, 2014, ISBN 0-7851-8952-1)
    - The Iron Nail (collects #16–21, hc, 144 pages, 2014, ISBN 0-7851-8953-X; tpb, 2015, ISBN 0-7851-8954-8)
    - The Tomorrow Soldier (collects #22–25, hc, 136 pages, 2015, ISBN 0-7851-8955-6; tpb, 2015, ISBN 0-7851-8956-4)
  - Winter Soldier: The Bitter March #1–5 (with Roland Boschi, 2014) also collected as Winter Soldier: The Bitter March (tpb, 112 pages, 2014, ISBN 0-7851-5473-6)
  - All-New Captain America: Fear Him #1–6 (co-written by Remender and Dennis Hopeless, art by Szymon Kudranski, 2014)
    - The digital series was first published in print as a 4-issue limited series titled All-New Captain America: Fear Him (2015)
    - Also collected in Captain America: Sam Wilson — The Complete Collection Volume 1 (tpb, 488 pages, 2020, ISBN 1-302-92325-0)
  - All-New Captain America #1–6 (with Stuart Immonen, 2015) also collected in Captain America: Sam Wilson — The Complete Collection Volume 1 (tpb, 488 pages, 2020, ISBN 1-302-92325-0)
  - Secret Wars: Hail Hydra #1–4 (with Roland Boschi, 2015) also collected as Secret Wars — Warzones: Hail Hydra (tpb, 112 pages, 2015, ISBN 0-7851-9871-7)
- AXIS #1–9 (with Adam Kubert (#1–2, 7, 9), Leinil Francis Yu (#3–4, 8–9), Terry Dodson (#5–6, 9) and Jim Cheung (#9), 2014–2015) collected as Avengers and X-Men: AXIS (hc, 264 pages, 2015, ISBN 0-7851-9095-3; tpb, 2017, ISBN 1-302-90414-0)
- Uncanny Avengers vol. 2 #1–5 (with Daniel Acuña; issues #3–4 are co-written by Remender and Gerry Duggan, 2015) collected as Uncanny Avengers: Counter-Evolutionary (tpb, 112 pages, 2015, ISBN 0-7851-9237-9)
- Avengers: Rage of Ultron (with Jerome Opeña and Pepe Larraz, graphic novel, 120 pages, 2015, ISBN 0-7851-9040-6)

=== Other publishers ===
- Dynamite:
  - Classic Battlestar Galactica #1–5 (with Carlos Rafael, 2006–2007)
    - Collected as Classic Battlestar Galactica (tpb, 112 pages, 2007, ISBN 1-933305-45-2)
    - Collected in Classic Battlestar Galactica Omnibus Volume 1 (tpb, 312 pages, 2017, ISBN 1-5241-0127-3)
  - Red Sonja: Vacant Shell (with Paul Renaud, one-shot, 2007) collected in Red Sonja: Travels (tpb, 144 pages, 2008, ISBN 1-933305-20-7)
  - Devolution #1–5 (with Jonathan Wayshak, 2016) collected as Devolution (tpb, 128 pages, 2016, ISBN 1-5241-0028-5)
- Dark Horse:
  - The End League (with Mat Broome (#1–4), Eric Canete (#4–8) and Andy MacDonald (#9), 2007–2009) collected as:
    - Ballad of Big Nothing (collects #1–4, tpb, 104 pages, 2009, ISBN 1-59582-195-3)
    - Weathered Statues (collects #5–9, tpb, 152 pages, 2010, ISBN 1-59582-517-7)
    - Library Edition (collects #1–9, hc, 248 pages, 2018, ISBN 1-5067-0373-9)
  - Gigantic #1–5 (with Eric Nguyen, 2008–2010) collected as Gigantic (tpb, 128 pages, 2010, ISBN 1-59582-326-3; hc, 2018, ISBN 1-5067-1029-8)
- DC Comics:
  - The All-New Atom #21–25: "Inside Out" (with Pat Olliffe, 2008) collected in The All-New Atom: Small Wonder (tpb, 192 pages, 2008, ISBN 1-4012-1996-9)
  - Booster Gold vol. 2 #13–14: "Stars in Your Eyes" (with Pat Olliffe, 2008–2009)
- The Corps! #0 (with Michael Penick, Devil's Due, 2008)
  - This release was supposed to lead in to a 6-issue The Corps! limited series which ended up not being published.
  - A collected edition was advance-solicited for a 2009 release but subsequently cancelled: The Corps! (tpb, 144 pages, ISBN 1-934692-97-2)
- Legion of the Supernatural (with Bret Blevins, unreleased series intended for publication by IDW Publishing — initially announced for 2008)
  - Three issues were solicited before the series was pulled off schedule.
  - A collected edition was advance-solicited for a 2009 release but subsequently cancelled: Legion of the Supernatural, Volume 1 (tpb, 104 pages, ISBN 1-60010-398-7)
- The Last Days of American Crime #1–3 (with Greg Tocchini, Radical, 2009–2010) collected as The Last Days of American Crime (tpb, 168 pages, 2010, ISBN 1-935417-06-1; hc, Image, 2015, ISBN 1-63215-431-5)
- Anthrax: Among the Living: "Efilnikufesin (N.F.L.)" (co-written by Remender and Joe Trohman, art by Roland Boschi, anthology graphic novel, 120 pages, Z2 Comics, 2021, ISBN 1-940878-59-4)

Preceded by Victor Gischler	The Punisher writer 2009–2010	Succeeded by Greg Rucka
Preceded by Craig Kyle; Christopher Yost (X-Force vol. 3)	X-Force writer 2010–2013	Succeeded by Sam Humphries (Uncanny X-Force vol. 2); Dennis Hopeless (Cable and X-Force)
Preceded by Daniel Way	Venom writer 2011–2012	Succeeded by Cullen Bunn
Preceded by Warren Ellis	Secret Avengers writer 2012–2013	Succeeded by Nick Spencer
Preceded by Ed Brubaker	Captain America writer 2012–2015	Succeeded by Nick Spencer
Preceded by n/a	Uncanny Avengers writer 2012–2015	Succeeded by Gerry Duggan
