= The End League =

- Cover of The End League #1

Publication information
- Publisher: Dark Horse Comics
- Schedule: Bi-Monthly
- Format: Ongoing series
- Publication date: January 2008 – October 2009
- No. of issues: 9
- Main character(s): Astonishman; Soldier American; The Arachnakid; The Prairie Ghost; Codename Black; Brother Occult; Divinity; Grimwood; Blur Girl; Mother Hive; The Blue Gauntlet

Creative team
- Created by: Rick Remender; Mat Broome
- Written by: Rick Remender
- Artist: Mat Broome
- Inker: Sean Parsons
- Colorist: Wendy Broome

Collected editions
- The Ballad of Big Nothing: ISBN 1-59582-195-3
- Weathered Statues: ISBN 159582300X

The End League is a fictional superhero team appearing in a self-titled bi-monthly comic book series by Dark Horse Comics, which began in January 2008.

The series was created by Rick Remender and Mat Broome and focuses on the struggles of the last of the superheroes in a world in which the supervillains have prevailed and enslaved what remains of the world.

== Publication history ==
The series was written by Rick Remender, with pencils by Mat Broome, and inks by Sean Parsons.

As of issue #5, Broome left for Marvel Comics and Eric Canete took over art duties, with Dave Stewart providing the coloring. With the new art team in place for the start of the second story arc, the title started appearing on a monthly basis.

Due to Remender also signing an exclusive deal with Marvel Comics, he wound up both of his creator-owned Dark Horse series, with The End League ending in a double-length issue #9.

== Characters ==
=== Team members ===
- Astonishman (Brian Terrance) – Known as the world's greatest hero, he was more than 100 years old before his death. Astonishman blamed himself for the state of the world due to his involvement in the Green Event (see below). He possessed super strength, super hearing, flight, and invulnerability. Astonishman drew energy from the Earth's core. When his skin was broken, he leaked the very energy that granted him his powers. Upon his death, the energy vacated his body in a blast of nuclear proportions. He died from grievous injuries sustained at the hands (and hammer) of Thor.
- Soldier American (Nicholas "Nick" Winters) – Active since the 1930s, Soldier American participated in a government program that gave him the speed and strength of ten men. He also has the ability to create energy machetes. During a raid on a food facility, he killed his longtime sidekick, The Devil Boy, while possessed by the villain Scarecrow Sinister.
- Blur Girl (Rebecca Watts) – Blur is the fastest human left alive. She is Astonishman's goddaughter and is in a romantic relationship with The Blue Gauntlet.
- The Blue Gauntlet (Palmira) – Described by writer Rick Remender as "a pacifist powered by an ancient alien parasite," Palmira is in a lesbian relationship with Rebecca. Her powers seem to be mainly energy-based. She can also fly. Though she has fought valiantly by the sides of the rest of the End League, Mother Hive will not confide in her as she does the rest of the team due in great part to the fact that she has mental blocks that prevent Mother Hive from accessing her mind telepathically.
- Mother Hive – Mother Hive is a powerful telepath who coordinates the team's missions from the safety of the Citadel of Seclusion.
- The Arachnakid – A young (15 years old) and extremely tall and lithe adventurer with two pairs of arms, sharp teeth, and an acerbic wit used to hide his loneliness and self-pity. He seems to be in love with Blur Girl.
- The Prairie Ghost – Deemed by writer Rick Remender a "living poltergeist," the Prairie Ghost's powers and personality have yet to be fully revealed. He possesses a strong, ghostly steed (CrowBait) and wields mystical chains as weaponry. He speaks with a Southern accent and seems to be of a rather bellicose mentality. He, like Codename Black, does not seem to have any compunctions regarding using lethal force when necessary.
- Brother Occult – Called the "mysterious Master of the Nether Realms," this mage's power seems to be derived mainly from the bargains he makes with various demons, such as one known as Azul. Azul is supposedly bound in servitude to Brother Occult.
- Divinity – A self-described "god-killer," Divinity is one of the "big three," a subgroup comprising the leadership of The End League. The other members are Codename Black and Astonishman. Divinity wields a powerful sword that can both wound and heal (as evidenced by its temporary restoration of Thor's mental capacity, post-lobotomy). The series hints at strong sexual/romantic tension between her and Astonishman. It is hinted that she also played a part in the Green Event, as she was supposed to be Earth's protector when the event happened. There is also mention of her having killed Thor, a fact that only she and her father Zeus know about.
- Codename Black (Zane Ladle) – A mysterious non-Magnificent clad in an impressive suit of armor and revealed to have extensive knowledge of martial arts, as well as near-perfect skills in planning. He also seemingly shows little to no hesitance when it comes to the use of lethal force (as seen in issue #2). According to a conversation with his nemesis, the Smiling Man, Black's family all received powers during the Green Event. They subsequently went mad and became super villains. This further stoked the flames of Codename Black's paranoia regarding all Magnificents. Soldier American openly described him as a "schizophrenic."
- Grimwood – Described by writer Rick Remender as a "spirit-man made of Earth stuff," Grimwood is an enormous humanoid with an extremely easygoing demeanor. He also seems to be the most philosophical of the remaining Magnificents, and does his best to keep his friends optimistic. He has something of a father-son relationship with Arachnakid, and is relentless in his desire to protect his friends and the remaining innocents on Earth after the Green Event.

=== Adversaries ===
- Thor – The Norse God of Thunder and son of Odin, Thor disobeyed his father's orders, refusing to return to Valhalla, instead staying on Earth to help mankind. He is mysteriously absent and presumed dead on the day of the Green Event. It is hinted that he and Astonishman are at around the same level in terms of sheer power; Astonishman's monologue in issue #1 supports the theory that the two titans were friends at some point. Thor arrives at the end of issue #1, lobotomized by and completely under the control of Dead Lexington. He beats Astonishman to death between moments of lucidity brought about by Divinity's sword.
- Charles "Dead" Lexington – Archenemy of Astonishman, Dead Lexington was responsible for tricking Astonishman into triggering the Green Event. Following "The Day of Annihilation" (an event in which most of the world's superheroes died, see Plot Synopsis below), Dead Lexington appointed himself ruler of the world. In exchange for power, he made a deal with a demon called Nargor'ri the Ravager, offering the demon all the nations of the world except for his city, New Lexington.
- Scarecrow Sinister – Capable of possessing others, Scarecrow Sinister operates a food facility for Dead Lexington in the remains of northern Canada and seems to have the ability to possess the bodies and minds of others, turning them into puppets to follow his will. While Scarecrow Sinister was possessing Prairie Ghost to kill Soldier American, Blur Girl killed the villain by throwing his body out of a building.
- The Smiling Man – A clown-like villain inhabiting a trap-filled amusement park in the city of Lore, formerly known as Los Angeles. Easily the most unhinged villain, he openly acknowledges the homoerotic undertones of his relationship with Codename Black. He evidently keeps a "stable of wives" with whom he regularly seems to have sex with. He is also related to Codename Black, but not a member of the Family Fear.
- Wolfsangel – A brutal Nazi warlord with seemingly reptilian characteristics. He plans to overthrow Dead Lexington by using the hammer of Thor and the clones of dead superheroes. He conducts his experiments in his city, called the Berlin Dome.
- Minister of Matter (Peter Ladle) – Member of the Family Fear, Dead Lexington's most trusted associate, and one of Codename Black's brothers. He joined forces with Wolfsangel and other villains to overthrow Dead Lexington.
- Sonic Eel (Jen Ladle) – Member of the Family Fear and Codename Black's sister.
- Azul – A demon once forced to serve Brother Occult. It has become a herald to Nargor'ri.
- Nargor'ri the Ravager – An inter-dimensional demon whose sole purpose is to end all life for mortals and gods. It has already killed all the Norse gods in Asgard and is moving on to Olympus and Earth.

== Magnificents ==
During the Green Event, Astonishman uses his super-hearing to determine which city needs his help the most. While doing so he overhears survivors of the Green Event gaining and using their powers for the first time. Most of these survivors become selfish and corrupt, looking only for ways to exploit their new-found abilities for any type of monetary gain. The majority of the Magnificents live in "Dead" Lexington's city (New York), but the few heroes that survive live with Astonishman in his Citadel of Seclusion in Australia, now a snow-covered wasteland.

== Plot ==
In May 1962, the superhero Astonishman triggers a worldwide cataclysm known as the Green Event. His archenemy, the villain Dead Lexington, leads Astonishman to believe that an alien ship at the bottom of the ocean is a Communist nuclear facility. Astonishman detonates a nuclear missile in the ship, which explodes the alien power core, releasing a wave of radiation and knocking the Earth off its axis. The resulting radiation kills three billion people, with one in ten thousand of the survivors later developing superhuman abilities. Astonishman's responsibility for the Green Event is a fact of which only he and Dead Lexington are aware.

The Norse god Thor is the sole remaining classical god on Earth. Believed to be the only being whose power equaled Astonishman's, Thor goes missing on the day of the Green Event and is believed dead. In reality, he is slain by Divinity using her father's (Zeus) sword (God Killer) . Only Divinity and Zeus know of this.

Selecting the most noble of the super-humans, Astonishman forms the Squadron of Righteousness. Its mission is to repair the damage done to the planet and to protect humanity against the other super-humans who have become super-villains. Eventually, the super-villains join forces and eliminate the world's superheroes in an event known as the Day of Annihilation. Astonishman and the surviving superheroes escape to his Citadel of Seclusion located in Australia, which has turned into a frozen wasteland. There, they remain hidden for twelve years. Known as The End League, the heroes spend that time focusing on survival and searching for the hammer of Thor, Mjöllnir, which they believe can save the world.

On the twelfth anniversary of the Day of Annihilation, the starving members of The End League plan a raid on Scarecrow Sinister's food facility in northern Canada. Astonishman gathers a strike team consisting of himself, Soldier American, Prairie Ghost, Divinity, Brother Occult, and the rookie Blur Girl. When they arrive, Brother Occult's demon servant, Azul, attacks the team and betrays them to Dead Lexington. Dead Lexington appears via remote monitor, gloating that he knows the location of the Citadel of Seclusion and would be attacking it shortly. As Blur Girl runs off to warn the team, she is stopped by a now-lobotomized Thor, who stands ready to kill his former allies.

The brain-damaged Thor and The End League battle. Blur Girl and Soldier American are quickly incapacitated. Astonishman is initially paralyzed by doubts about his team's ability to defeat Thor, but ends up joining in the fight. Divinity temporarily restores Thor's lucidity with her sword. Thor warns Astonishman that a greater danger threatens Earth and then tells Astonishman that he must kill him. When Thor loses his mind once again, Astonishman is still reluctant to kill him. Thor strikes a mortal blow against Astonishman with Mjolnir by piercing the armor that holds in Astonishman's energy. The energy released from Astonishman's body explodes, apparently killing both men. Mjolnir is undamaged and recovered by an unknown figure who may possibly be Lexington.

Lexington proclaims Astonishman's death to the public and moves to consolidate his power. He sends his agents to abduct Kelly Klein, the leader of an underground church and Astonishman's wife. Promising Astonishman that he would protect her, Codename Black battles the agents, even going so far as to utilize a lethal, throat-crushing maneuver against his sister Sonic Eel to stop her from using her powers. Unfortunately, he fails to stop them from capturing Klein.

In the Nether Realm, Azul gloats to the captive Brother Occult and tells him that while Lexington freed the demon, Azul himself serves a greater power known as Nargor'ri the Ravager. Nargor'ri appears in the final scene of Book 1 with a promise to "end all."

In Book 2, we see a familiar-looking boy dressed in Nazi attire in 1941. He is brought to Wolfsangel and trained to kill Jewish prisoners. He is among a group of other children, each of whom appear to have been experimented on, and possesses super powers. When one of the children, a girl named Elsa refuses to kill the Jewish prisoners, Wolfsangel murders her. The execution of the Jewish captives is interrupted by Astonishman and a group of soldiers known as the Flying 33rd. The young man seen at the beginning of the book can form light daggers and possesses telekinesis. He seizes Astonishman's shield and uses it to kill all of the Nazis except Wolfsangel, who teleports away. The reader is led to believe that the boy is the future Soldier American. After this incident, Astonishman never uses his shield again.

More to come...

== Collected editions ==
The series is being collected into two trade paperbacks:

- Ballad of Big Nothing (collects issues #1–4, 104 pages, Dark Horse Comics, October 2008, ISBN 1-59582-195-3)
- Weathered Statues (collects issues #5–9, 104 pages, Dark Horse Comics, June 2010, ISBN 1-59582-300-X)
