= Deadly Class =

American comic book series by Rick Remender

- Cover art for Deadly Class #1. Art by Wes Craig

Publication information
- Publisher: Image Comics
- Schedule: Monthly
- Genre: Action-thriller; Period drama Teen drama
- Publication date: January 22, 2014–October 19, 2022
- No. of issues: 56

Creative team
- Created by: Rick Remender
- Written by: Rick Remender
- Artist: Wes Craig
- Letterer: Rus Wooton
- Colorist(s): Lee Loughridge (#1-14; 45-present); Jordan Boyd (#15-44)
- Editor(s): Sebastian Girner (#1-37); Briah Skelly (#38-41); Will Dennis (#42-present)

Collected editions
- SC Vol. 1: ISBN 978-1632150035
- SC Vol. 2: ISBN 978-1632152220
- SC Vol. 3: ISBN 978-1632154767
- SC Vol. 4: ISBN 978-1632157188
- SC Vol. 5: ISBN 978-1534300552
- SC Vol. 6: ISBN 978-1534302471
- SC Vol. 7: ISBN 978-1534306967
- SC Vol. 8: ISBN 978-1534310636
- SC Vol. 9: ISBN 978-1534315686
- SC Vol. 10: ISBN 978-1534319325
- SC Vol. 11: ISBN 978-1534320079
- SC Vol. 12: ISBN 978-1534323407
- HC Vol. 1: ISBN 978-1632156648
- HC Vol. 2: ISBN 978-1534308411

Deadly Class is an American action comic book series written by Rick Remender, illustrated by Wes Craig, colored by Jason Wordie, and lettered by Rus Wooton. Deadly Class is set primarily in the 1980s and follows students enrolled at King's Dominion Atelier of the Deadly Arts, a secret boarding school in San Francisco, as they train to become the next generation of top assassins for crime families across the globe.

Image Comics has published Deadly Class on a mostly monthly basis since the first issue was released on January 22, 2014. It has taken numerous short breaks, and Remender announced the last storyline would take place from issue 49 through to issue 56.

A television adaptation aired on SyFy for one season from January 16 to March 20, 2019, before being cancelled on a cliffhanger.

== Plot ==
The first issues of Deadly Class focus on the story of teenage orphan Marcus Lopez Arguello as he transitions from living on the streets to being enrolled into a school of assassins. The academy, run by Master Lin, is composed of children of mob bosses and mass murderers, learning the same trade as their parents.

Marcus's decision to attend the school is one of the only decisions he gets to make for himself throughout the arc and history. His entire life has been composed of unfortunate events, each leaving him further ostracized from humanity. Marcus is homeless largely because his parents died in a horrible accident when he was young, leaving him in an orphanage whose headmaster required his manual labor for him to retain residence. This continued degradation of his sanity through the abuse by the hands of his roommates and guardians eventually drives him to committing a massive act of violence. Deadly Class then follows the students in the academy and many of their eventual downfalls.

== Characters ==
- Marcus Lopez Arguello is the newest addition to King's Dominion. Plagued by tragedy and trauma, Marcus still finds himself an outcast at the school in regards to both the students and the teachers. At the beginning of the story he aspires to kill President Ronald Reagan whom he blames for inadvertently killing his parents and ruining his life. After the death of his parents, Marcus was sent to live at the Sunset Boys Home where he was forced to work in a sweat shop where he was abused by the guards and also his cruel roommate Chester Wilson. One day, Marcus made a makeshift bomb out of needles from the workshop which he used to escape which disfigures Chester. Marcus escapes the Boys Home but Chester slaughters all of the other kids there and burns the place down which Marcus is blamed for. Marcus is left on the streets to fend for himself and wanted by the police until Master Lin finds him and offers him a place at Kings Dominion. Marcus is given the title of a Rat, which is the lowest status at Kings Dominion. At Kings Dominion, Marcus befriends Willie, Billy and Petra, and begins a secret relationship with Maria. However, he is secretly in love with Saya. During the finals, he and the other rats are hunted by their legacy classmates. Marcus goes on the run with Petra and Billy. Eventually, he is caught by Saya and seemingly killed. In reality, Saya faked his death and asked him to live on the run with Maria, never to return to Kings Dominion. Eventually they are tracked down by Quan and his group to ruin Saya's reputation. Marcus returns to Kings Dominion. He eventually incites an insurrection at the school, killing Master Lin and fleeing. After many years as an assassin, Marcus settles down with Maria and abandons the assassin life, becoming a successful author. He and Maria marry and have two kids. They are forced into hiding after being hunted by Shabnam and Brandy, but are able to fight back. With Shabnam and Brandy gone, Marcus and Maria are able to have a happy ending.
- Saya Kuroki (Japanese: 黒木沙耶, Hepburn: Kuroki Saya) is the leader of the Kuroki Syndicate (Note: Also known as the Kuroki-gumi (黒木組), it is considered Japan's largest Yakuza syndicate in the Deadly Class universe.) at King's Dominion. Her preferred weapon is a katana, which was passed down through her family. It's revealed that Saya since childhood has been competing to be head of her family's clan with her older brother, Kenji and wanted desperately to impress her father. Kenji framed Saya for murdering a fellow yakuza head and breaking a truce which caused their father to take his own life and Saya to be disgraced and wanted dead for treason. Saya enrolled in Kings Dominion to reclaim her rightful place and to take refuge from Kenji and his assassins trying to kill her and take back their family's sword. Marcus had a crush on her but Saya distanced herself from him. Saya grew to love Marcus, but she never acted on her feelings because of her ambition to return home and reclaim her place as head of her family's crime organization. She was upset that Marcus started dating Maria and began flirting with Marcus. This led to Saya and Marcus sleeping together which Marcus ran away in panic leaving Saya alone the next morning. During the raid on Fuckface's hideout, Saya is confronted by Maria who correctly suspects that she slept with Marcus and it leads to a heated and violent argument between them. Saya feeling hurt and betrayed leaves Marcus and Maria to fend for themselves and bitter when she sees them back at King's Dominion together. When Maria disappears, Marcus tells Saya he loves her but she rejects his confession telling him that she's already dating Willie which puts a big strain between them and Marcus accusing her of killing Maria. During the Finals, Saya is forced to hunt down Marcus and the rats seemingly without hesitation that Willie argues with about it but she breaks things off with Willie and leaves on her own. Saya has a change of heart when she reads Marcus's journal and she realizes that not everything is worth sacrificing. This causes her to save Marcus by faking his death by temporarily poisoning him which also makes her pass her exam. The next year, the finals had left Saya distant and alone with most of her friends dead and Marcus out of her life. Saya is trying to move on while trying to protect the new freshmen but then she and the freshmen are attacked on Halloween by Kenji's henchmen. Saya fends them off and helps the freshmen escape but she is betrayed and stabbed by Quan who leaves her to be captured. Saya is taken back to Japan where she is recovering from her injuries but still held prisoner by her family. Her mother tries to help Saya escape but Kenji thwarts their efforts and kills their mother and knocks Saya out. Saya is later drugged and chained up in a cell where Kenji tells her that he knows Marcus is alive and his men are going to close in and capture him to show Master Lin that Saya cheated so that she would be expelled and disgraced. When Kenji's plan fails, he decides to just kill her which make Quan have a change of heart and free Saya. After getting her family katana back, her and Quan fled Japan on Quan's family's boat but Saya kills Quan for betraying her and selling out Marcus. Saya returns to King's Dominion where she finds out that Marcus and Maria returned as well and that Master Lin now knows she cheated on her finals which makes him strip her of her status and make her a rat. Disgraced and alienated, Saya tries to convince Marcus to leave but he acts cold towards her as he hasn't fully forgiven Saya for last year which causes even more of a strain between them. At Stefano's cabin Saya fights off the honeycomb cultists but Shabnam takes advantage of the situation and knocks her out temporarily and handcuffs her hand to a pipe in the cabin that's on fire and leaves her to resort to cutting off her own hand in order to escape. Losing her hand makes her even more angry at Marcus and when Marcus and the rats choose to turn against Kings Dominion at the finals, she chooses to protect Master Lin in a last ditch attempt at regaining her status back. Saya is forced to fight Marcus to protect Lin but it's in vain as an earthquake occurs which causes Kings Dominion to be destroyed and Saya is willing to accept her fate of dying there until Marcus saves her despite her pleas to him to let her die and Saya disappears when Marcus is unconscious. For many years, Saya is left homeless and addicted to heroin while still on the run from Kenji's assassins. Saya even pawned her family's katana for heroin which leads Kenji right to her. Saya is found by Marcus who was secretly hired by Kenji to kill her, Marcus detox's Saya and they rekindle their old feelings for each other. But it is short lived as Saya finds out that Marcus was hired by Kenji to kill her but Marcus doesn't go through with it and instead tries to make Saya let go of her revenge and ambition and start a new life with him. Saya chooses to kill Kenji and runs away leaving a letter to Marcus. In 2020, Saya is now head of her family's clan and she is now a cold and bitter person who spends most of her nights doing heroin and being in orgies. Saya regrets not being with Marcus as he is now married to Maria and has kids with her living a normal happy life. Saya is informed by her men that Shabnam and Brandy plan to kill Marcus and his family but Saya chooses to do nothing as she is still angry with him. Saya begins to rethink her decision until she is caught off guard when she finds Shabnam waiting for her at her home who just killed her girlfriend, Jayla. Before Saya can act, Shabnam shoots her straight through her head killing her instantly.
- Willie Lewis is a member of the Final World Order (F.W.O.) (Note: It is a powerful and feared African-American gang based in Oakland, California (a city very close to San Francisco, California, where King's Dominion is headquartered).) at King's Dominion and is one of Marcus's best friends. Willie is a sharpshooter who specializes in firearms. It's revealed that Willie is really a pacifist and he hates violence after he accidentally killed his own father when intruders broke into his home. He got Marcus a job at a comic shop that he also worked at. He begins to briefly dated Saya which caused a strain between him and Marcus. During the finals, Master Lin threatens to kill Willie's family if he lets the Rats escape alive so Willie is hesitant to kill Marcus. Even when he had Marcus at gunpoint, Willie couldn't bring himself to kill Marcus but instead was willing to kill himself until Marcus talked him out of it. Willie and Marcus were gonna escape together until Viktor shot Willie through the back killing him. Willie's little sister Jayla enrolled at Kings Dominion to find what happened to her brother and avenge her brother. Marcus has visions of Willie trying to talk sense into him when he is making difficult decisions.
- Maria Esperanza Salazar is Marcus's girlfriend; a member of the Soto Vatos (Note: Based in Ciudad Juarez, Chihuahua (in northern Mexico), it is a powerful Mexican drug cartel, whose most notorious leader was the infamous El Alma del Diablo, a violent and brutal Mexican drug lord and father of Maria's abusive ex-boyfriend, Chico.) and Chico's former girlfriend. Maria's preferred weapons are bladed fans, and she is often seen adorned in Dia de Los Muertos attire. She was forcefully adopted by the Salazars after they slaughtered her family when her father stole from them. She was groomed to be Chico's wife against her will and forced to go to King's Dominion to protect Chico. Maria kills Chico to save Marcus after Chico caught them almost having sex in Las Vegas and nearly killed Marcus out of jealousy. After Chico's death, Maria becomes the new leader of the Soto Vatos and her and Marcus date in secret. Maria is an emotional wreck from trying to hide Chico's death from the Salazars and Master Lin and becomes increasingly jealous of Saya's flirting with Marcus. Her paranoia is realized when she realizes Marcus and Saya slept together and she confronts both of them about it. Maria almost breaks up with Marcus until the Salazars come and find out about Chico and Maria and Marcus flee for their lives. While escaping Marcus realizes his true feelings for Maria and they reconcile while planning to fight back. Maria fights back at the Salazars, killing Chico's father and uncles thus avenging her family. Maria goes to confess to Master Lin but Lin betrays her to the remaining Salazars and drugs her and she is believed to be dead. It's revealed that Maria is alive and held hostage and tortured by the Salazars as revenge for killing their kin. Marcus breaks into the Salazar household and frees Maria and they kill the remaining Salazar family once and for all. Maria and Marcus escape and live together in Puerto Penasco where they try to move on, but Marcus still wants revenge against King's Dominion. They run into Petra and the new freshmen who are on the run and they socialize at the motel Marcus and Maria are hiding in. It's not long until their ambushed by Viktor and Brandy who were following the freshmen but Quan tips them off and gives them a chance to escape. Until Kenji's men come and completely swarms the motel and Marcus and the group are forced to fend them all off. Maria finds out that the Yakuza know Quan and She interrogates him into revealing his true motives. Maria then saves Marcus from getting killed by Viktor and takes him down. Maria tried to convince Marcus not to kill Viktor and he nearly does until coming to his senses and he walks away with her sparing Viktor's life. They are overwhelmed by Kenji's men and Marcus nearly turns himself in to save the others until Viktor gives them a chance to escape. They hideout in Tosawhi's family home until Marcus convinces Maria and the group that they have no choice to go back to King's Dominion and end the school once and for all. Master Lin welcomes both Marcus and Maria with open arms and makes them legacies. Both Marcus and Maria become top of the class and popular but their relationship begins to strain as Marcus becomes focused on his revenge plan and Maria doubts if going back was a good idea. Maria begins to get close to her roommate Stefano which makes Marcus jealous. At the Stefano's Cabin, Stefano seduces Maria into having sex which Marcus catches them and runs away heartbroken and Maria in instant regret. But then she is ambushed by the honeycomb cultists and Stefano runs away to fend for herself. Maria finds Marcus as Helmut is about to kill him but Helmut gains the upper hand and nearly kills Maria until being shot down by Stefano. Stefano tries to comfort her but Marcus takes his gun and shoots Stefano dead which horrifies Maria and causes her to flee which ended their relationship. After King's Dominion, Maria marries a cartel leader Valasco and she lives in Mexico for eight years until she finds out he's cheating on her. Maria personally hires Marcus to kill her husband and his mistress but Marcus only kills the husband and spares the young woman. While being ambushed by his men, Maria finds him and they argue about Marcus sparing the woman. Maria tries to call off her men and make Marcus escape but they immediately turn on her and both Marcus and Maria are forced to kill the cartel. Marcus almost leaves Maria to fend for herself but chooses to take her with him and they escape with Marcus promising Maria he won't let her down again. After this Marcus and Maria get back together and start a normal life back in San Francisco. Maria becomes a nanny working for rich people while Marcus is trying to become an author. Maria begins to suffer from an autoimmune disease which puts her in constant agony because they don't have the money or the insurance at the time. Marcus considers going back to being an assassin but Maria convinces him they can't go back no matter what. Marcus proposes to Maria and while Maria has doubts they will get through this, Marcus tells her how much she means to him and that they will which she accepts. They go back to Las Vegas to get married where they see their old highschool friends again attending as witnesses. Marcus's book series Lone Star becomes a success and Marcus and Maria become rich and they have two children together. Maria helps support Marcus dealing with the stress of running his new show and having to do commercials. Marcus begins to become depressed as the years become more chaotic but Maria tells him that while things are bad to try to be positive and optimistic about the future and that negativity is contagious. Marcus and Maria become aware that Shabnam and Brandy are trying to kill them and they go into hiding for three years to plan and train. Marcus and Maria break into Shabnam and Brandy's home where they easily catch them off guard and knock them out. While they are tied up, Marcus and Maria tell Shabnam and Brandy that they knew they were trying to kill them and they are doing this to protect their children. They cut them free but tell them only one can leave alive which makes Brandy kill her husband with no hesitation not knowing that Marcus and Maria set her up to incriminate her even more. Marcus and Maria return home relieved that their children are safe and that it's all over. While Maria doubts that they are finally safe and that they can live normally now Marcus tells her that some people do deserve happy endings.
- Master Lin is the ruthless headmaster of King's Dominion.
- Viktor is a Russian brute who is the son of Joseph Stalin's personal assassin. Viktor utilizes his brute strength to overwhelm his opponents. Viktor comes to Kings Dominion to earn his father's respect. When he was a boy his mother was raped and murdered by British agents wanting to kill his father when he was away and his father blamed him for being too weak to protect her. Viktor antagonizes Marcus and his friends and aspires to become Valedictorian. When he overhears Marcus talking about Lex's death he tries to blackmail Marcus and his friends which forces Marcus to try and kill him which he fails to do. Viktor takes this personally and begins to ruthlessly pursue Marcus and his friends during the freshmen finals to kill them. Viktor passes the finals by killing Willie and joins Shabnam's group to rule the school after the finals. Viktor tries to kill Saya only for him to see Quan betray her. Viktor takes credit for her supposed death and blackmails Quan into being his informant. When the freshmen escape Kings Dominion after starting a riot in a pep rally, Viktor and Brandy pursue them to Mexico while being tipped off by Quan. Viktor finds out Marcus and Maria are alive but then they get attacked by Yakuza sent by Kenji to capture Marcus which forces them to briefly join forces to fend them off. Viktor later gets into a brutal fight with Marcus which Viktor mostly has the upper hand until Maria comes in and takes him down. Marcus almost kills Viktor but chooses to spare his life which Viktor returns the favor by fending off the yakuza giving Marcus and his friends a chance to escape. When Marcus returns to Kings Dominion, Viktor becomes a reluctant ally to him. When the Honeycomb cult attacks the class at the cabin, Viktor helps them escape but Jayla takes the opportunity to catch him off-guard. Jayla shoots him in the head for killing her brother Willie.
- Petra Yolga is a goth girl who comes from a death cult and one of the Rats at Kings Dominion. Petra specializes in poison, and gained honors in a class because of this. During the finals, She kills Billy in order to pass the Finals and save herself. After the finals, She ditches her goth attire and is part of Shabnam's alliance where they constantly undermine her and mock her upbringing. Petra is kicked out of the group when she poisoned Brandy and damaged her vocal cords. She returns to her old goth look and begins to regret killing Billy to the point of willing to kill herself until Helmut stops her and they fall in love with each other after a night of bonding. Brandy kills her by fatally stabbing Petra in the neck while Marcus ambiguously lets it happen when he finds out she killed Billy and her death devastates Helmut.
- Shabnam is a portly, nerdy boy who is Marcus's former roommate. Being the son of a wealthy banker, Shabnam uses his intellect and wit to strategically win battles. Shabnam reveals himself to be a strategic genius who has collected secrets on his classmates in order to blackmail them. He uses this information during the finals to take control of his classmates and is responsible for the deaths of Billy and several others. Over the course of the series, Shabnam remains in positions of power using his intellect, but lacks respect from his peers. He survives to adulthood alongside Brady Lynn. He is eventually killed by Brandy after Marcus and Maria force the pair of them to fight to the death.
- Brandy Lynn is a Southern belle, and is known as the daughter of a famous neo-Nazi that assassinated dozens of civil rights activists. (Note: According to the TV adaptation of the comic book, her father is the leader of the infamous Dixie Mafia, a powerful crime syndicate based in the Southern United States, made up of White Southerners and with ties to the Ku Klux Klan.) She is considered loud, racist, and a generic Confederate redneck. Brandy is adept at hand-to-hand combat, and has been seen utilizing various throws and grapples that make her a deadly opponent.
- Billy Bennett is one of Marcus's best friends and one of the Rats at Kings Dominion. He is kindly and soft, and needed help to kill his father. His Father, a corrupt cop abused Billy and sent him to Kings Dominion to make a man out of his son. He seems friendly and funny, and he likes to skate. Billy dies after he is betrayed and poisoned by Petra so that she can pass the finals.
- Kelly "Grogda" is Shabnam's girlfriend who seduced Marcus at one point, and suffers from an eating disorder. Grogda joins Shabnam's group to rule over the students the following year with her trying to control Shabnam's actions. Over the year, Grogda begins to slim down presumably from doing Meth. Shabnam begins to get fed up with Grogda's controlling attitude and Brandy takes advantage of it by seducing him on her side. Grogda gets into an argument with Shabnam which ends in him killing her by hitting her in the head with a hatchet and then burning her corpse on a campfire.
- Chico Salazar is the leader of the Soto Vatos, Maria's former boyfriend. He was very controlling and abusive towards Maria thinking he saved Maria from being killed by his family when really they made her into their slave. He follows Maria and her friends to Las Vegas when Maria took off without telling him. He catches Marcus and Maria almost having sex and nearly kills Marcus out of jealous rage until Maria slices his throat with her bladed fan killing him. Chester “Fuckface” Wilson immediately takes his body and uses his head as blackmail to get revenge on Marcus.
- Lex is a British Punk member of the Rats and one of Billy's Friends. He can be rude and confrontational but he can be friendly. He helped Marcus and his friends attack Fuckface's hideout to get Chico's head back. However he dies by getting shot in the head by the Holy Ghost after the Salazars find Marcus's group.
- Kendall is Stephen's former boyfriend and the leader of the Preps. Kendall is the son of a corrupt FBI agent. He is one of the students who helped Marcus in the first issue. During the Finals, he tried to protect his boyfriend Stephen from being killed. Shabnam blackmails him about his secret and threatened to expose him and Stephen if they don't obey him. Kendall is about to kill Shabnam but Stephen shoots him in the head, accepting Shabnam's deal in favor of letting him live and being a part of his alliance.
- Stephen is Kendall's former boyfriend. All he wants is to be one of the top students at King's Dominion. Stephen's preferred weapon are nunchucks.
- Tosawhi is one of the new students. The others do not really like him but he does not seem to care. Like Billy, he is a skater. He later begins to develop a more friendly and upbeat attitude as he starts to open up to his friends and begins a relationship with Zenzele.
- Quan is one of the new students. He is both proud and arrogant. He is Half Vietnamese and White and wears Rockabilly attire. He attempted to hook up with Saya but finally gave up. He is revealed to be a mole working for Saya's Brother to destroy her reputation at King's Dominion. It's revealed that Quan knocked up a daughter of a powerful mob boss and Kenji helped “fix” his mistake in return Quan must do as Kenji says. When Kenji tells him that giving Saya over to him wasn't enough to settle his debt, Quan is tasked to find anything that would tarnish Saya's reputation. While searching he discovers that Saya spared Marcus which means she cheated on her finals and where Marcus is hiding. Quan is tasked to find Marcus but is then confronted by Viktor who blackmails him into working for him when he reveals to Quan that he saw Quan betray Saya. When the Freshmen flee King's Dominion, Quan takes them to Puerto Penasco where Marcus is while also letting Viktor and Brandy tail them. Quan finds Marcus but him and the freshmen bond with him and Quan begins to hesitate betraying Marcus and his friends. Quan tips them off about Viktor and Brandy but lets the Yakuza ambush them all. After the ambush, Quan is forced to go to Japan where he is punished and humiliated by Kenji for failing to capture Marcus. Finding out that Kenji is going to kill him and Saya, Quan frees Saya and helps get her Katana back from Kenji. They flee Japan and escape on Quan's family boat, while Quan wonders if redemption can be possible Saya takes the opportunity to stab Quan to death as revenge for betraying her and selling out Marcus and pushes his body into the ocean.
- Helmut is one of the new students. He is German, loves metal, and also loves other "hardcore" things. Helmut's preferred weapon is his Axe. Helmut then meets Petra who he talks out of killing herself. After a night of bonding they develop feelings for each other and they begin a relationship.
- Zenzele is one of the new students. She is very religious and good natured. However, when put in a life or death situation, Zenzele is capable of brutal strength and a murderous rage. Brandy targets her for her race and her passive personality which Zenzele talks back to Brandy saying the only special thing about her is that she's white and nothing else. She writes a lot of letters to her parents. It's revealed that her parents have been dead for a long time.

== Collected editions ==
Trade paperbacks
Title	Material collected	Publication date	ISBN
Book One: Noise Noise Noise
Deadly Class – Vol. 1: Reagan Youth	Deadly Class #1–6	July 16, 2014	978-1632150035
Deadly Class – Vol. 2: Kids of the Black Hole	Deadly Class #7–11	March 18, 2015	978-1632152220
Deadly Class – Vol. 3: Snake Pit	Deadly Class #12–16	October 7, 2015	978-1632154767
Book Two: The Funeral Party
Deadly Class – Vol. 4: Die for Me	Deadly Class #17–21	August 3, 2016	978-1632157188
Deadly Class – Vol. 5: Carousel	Deadly Class #22–26	March 15, 2017	978-1534300552
Deadly Class – Vol. 6: This Is Not the End	Deadly Class #27–31	December 26, 2017	978-1534302471
Book Three: Teen Age Riot
Deadly Class – Vol. 7: Love Like Blood	Deadly Class #32–35	August 28, 2018	978-1534306967
Deadly Class – Vol. 8: Never Go Back	Deadly Class #36–39, material from Free Comic Book Day 2019 Deadly Class	July 31, 2019	978-1534310636
Deadly Class – Vol. 9: Bone Machine	Deadly Class #40–44	June 17, 2020	978-1534315686
Book Four: Kids Will Be Skeletons
Deadly Class – Vol. 10: Save Your Generation	Deadly Class #45–48	October 20, 2021	978-1534319325
Deadly Class – Vol. 11: A Fond Farewell, Part One	Deadly Class #49–52	June 1, 2022	978-1534320079
Deadly Class - Vol. 12: A Fond Farewell, Part Two	Deadly Class #53-56	November 22, 2022	978-1534323407

Deluxe hardcovers
Title	Material collected	Publication date	ISBN
Deadly Class – Book One: Noise Noise Noise	Deadly Class #1–16	November 19, 2014	978-1632156648
Deadly Class – Book Two: The Funeral Party	Deadly Class #17–31	October 23, 2018	978-1534308411
Deadly Class – Book Three: Teen Age Riot	Deadly Class #32–44, material from Free Comic Book Day 2019 Deadly Class	March 9, 2022	978-1534321991
Deadly Class – Book Four: Kids Will Be Skeletons	Deadly Class #45–56	June 28, 2023	978-1534326057

Compendium
Title	Material Collected	Publication Date	ISBN
Deadly Class Compendium	Deadly Class #1–56, material from Free Comic Book Day 2019 Deadly Class	February 6, 2024	978-1534397972

== Television adaptation ==
Directors Anthony and Joe Russo have signed on to produce a television series based on Deadly Class. The Sony Pictures Television-produced adaptation has been optioned as a pilot for the Syfy channel. Benedict Wong, Benjamin Wadsworth, Lana Condor, Michel Duval and María Gabriela de Faría are among the actors cast in main roles for the series. On April 18, 2018, Syfy picked up the pilot to series. The first episode aired on January 16, 2019, on SyFy. After first season ending on a cliffhanger on March 20, 2019, the series was cancelled due to small audience and high production costs.

== See also ==
- Assassination Classroom
- The Abashiri Family
