= Black Science (comics) =

American science fiction comic book

- Black Science Vol. 1 cover. Art by Matteo Scalera.

Publication information
- Publisher: Image Comics
- Schedule: monthly
- Format: Ongoing series
- Genre: Science fiction
- Publication date: November 2013 – September 2019
- No. of issues: 43

Creative team
- Created by: Rick Remender
- Written by: Rick Remender
- Artist: Matteo Scalera
- Penciller: Matteo Scalera
- Inker: Matteo Scalera
- Colorist: Dean White

Black Science is a creator-owned science fiction American comic book series by Rick Remender and Italian artist Matteo Scalera. Image Comics released the first issue in November 2013. The story follows Grant McKay, an ex-member of the Anarchist Order of Scientists, and his team and family as they are thrown through dimensions as they try to repair his dimensional device, "the Pillar", created by forbidden, unethical means – the eponymous "Black Science". Via the Pillar, McKay and his fellow "Dimensionauts" were able to leap between worlds to find technological and medical advances for their own, but a member of Grant's team sabotages the pillar, causing it to jump to random locations at random times in increasingly lethal and hostile dimensions, forcing the team to try to return to their own dimension before they are killed by numerous hazards, ranging from parasitic fungi, nihilistic dimensional conquerors, and alternate versions of themselves.

The first several issues of Black Science sold out of first printings at the distributor level, and Image announced that certain issues would be reprinted.

== Synopsis ==
Grant McKay, former member of The Anarchistic Order of Scientists, has finally done the impossible: He has deciphered Black Science and punched through the barriers of reality. Grant theorizes that each alternate reality of what he calls the "Eververse" is like an onion. Pierce into each and you discover a new dimension, one based an infinite variety of choices made by everyone everywhere. What lies at the center is perhaps the primal universe that started it all. What lies beyond the veil is not epiphany, however, but chaos. Now Grant and his team are lost; living ghosts shipwrecked on an infinite ocean of alien worlds, barreling through the long-forgotten, ancient, and unimaginable dark realms.

== Characters ==
- Chandra – Second in command to Kadir.
- Grant McKay – Member of the Anarchist League of Scientists, father of Nathan and Pia McKay.
- Kadir – Bankrolled the Pillar project, often at odds with head scientist Grant McKay.
- Nathan McKay – Grant McKay's son, stranded with him in another dimension after the sabotage of the Pillar.
- Pia McKay – Grant McKay's daughter, stranded with him in another dimension after the sabotage of the Pillar.
- Rebecca – Scientist who worked on The Pillar and began an affair with Grant McKay.
- Sara McKay – Grant McKay's wife.
- Shawn – Junior scientist on the Pillar project for the Anarchistic Order of Scientists.
- Ward – Ex-military, now security officer for the Anarchistic Order of Scientists and Grant McKay.
- The Shaman – A medicine man from a dimension where Germany and highly technically advanced Native Americans are at war, who is abducted by, then later joins the Dimensionauts.

== Collected editions ==
Title	Material collected	Publication date	ISBN
Black Science Vol. 1: How to Fall Forever	Black Science #1–6	May 2014	9781607069676
Black Science Vol. 2: Welcome, Nowhere	Black Science #7–11	Jan 2015	9781632150189
Black Science Vol. 3: Vanishing Pattern	Black Science #12–16	Aug 2015	9781632153951
Black Science Premiere Edition Vol. 1: The Beginner's Guide to Entropy	Black Science #1–16 plus bonus material	Feb 2016	9781632154934
Black Science Vol. 4: Godworld	Black Science #17–21	May 2016	9781632156860
Black Science Vol. 5: True Atonement	Black Science #22–25	Dec 2016	9781534300330
Black Science Vol. 6: Forbidden Realms and Hidden Truths	Black Science #26–30	Jul 2017	9781534301825
Black Science Premiere Edition Vol. 2: Transcendentalism	Black Science #17–30 plus bonus material	Dec 2017	9781534303447
Black Science Vol. 7: Extinction is the Rule	Black Science #31–34	Mar 2018	9781534304932
Black Science Premiere Remastered Edition Vol. 1: The Beginner's Guide to Entropy	Black Science #1–16 plus bonus material	May 2018	9781534307407
Black Science Vol. 8: Later Than You Think	Black Science #35–38	Oct 2018	9781534306943
Black Science Vol. 9: No Authority But Yourself	Black Science #39–43	Nov 2019	9781534312135
Black Science Premiere Edition Vol. 3: A Brief Moment of Clarity	Black Science #31–43 plus bonus material	June 2020	9781534315822
