= Strange Girl (comics) =

- Cover of the first issue

Publication information
- Publisher: Image Comics
- Schedule: Monthly
- Format: Series
- Publication date: June 2005 – October 2007
- No. of issues: 18
- Main character: Strange Girl

Creative team
- Written by: Rick Remender
- Artist: Eric Nguyen

Strange Girl is a monthly comic series published by Image Comics. The author of the comic is Rick Remender, with art by Eric Nguyen.

== Plot ==
Bethany Black is the black sheep of her deeply religious family. While her mother, father, and brother sit down to study the Bible, she is off skating, smoking, and doing other things her family considers wicked. One day, while being chastised for her behavior, the rapture occurs. Her pious family, along with all of the other righteous humans, ascends to Heaven, while everyone else is left behind on Earth. God sends a message that he will now forsake Earth, and Satan and his demons rise from Hell to take over the planet. Ten years later, Bethany is working for the demon Lord Belial. She works for him in a bar and serves as a pet. She in turn has a pet demon named Bloato. Bloato is a "half-breed" demon, meaning that his mother and father are of two different species of demon. Earth has become Hell, with demons, giant insects, and fire reigning. Humans exist as slaves, used for labor and sex. In her years in Belial's servitude, Bethany has begun learning magic, and often uses protect spells to shield herself from the violent demons. One day, Bethany gets fed up and incurs Belial's wrath. While trying to escape her enraged master, Bloato tells her about the one remaining gate to Heaven, and that if Bethany can get to it, she may be able to sneak into Heaven. The gate is located in Vatican City.

== Characters ==
- Bethany Black: The main character. Bethany was not taken into Heaven along with the rest of her family during the rapture. 10 years later, she is the servant of Belial, and she has learned magic. Her relationship with Bloato is strange; he seems to be her pet, but it is unknown how they came to be together. Bethany is sarcastic, but is also a good person. She became an atheist because she believed in logic as opposed to faith, a dilemma which she discusses with Bloato. Despite her strained relationship with her family, she misses them very much and wants to see them after reaching the gate.
- Bloato: Bethany's half-breed "pet". His father was a Red demon and his mother a blue. He has a lot of contempt for Reds, seeing them as having no redeeming qualities (Blues at least have a sense of humor). He is vulgar and sarcastic, and often makes derogatory comments about humans, but he truly cares for Bethany.
- Tim: Tim is Bethany's childhood neighbor. Right after the rapture, Bethany helped shelter Tim in her parents' fallout shelter. When a homeless man tried to attack the pair, Tim stabbed the man through the heart with a fire poker. When Belial's demons found them, they were ordered to kill Tim, but his actions with the bum won him their respect. Ten years later, he was still hanging around his and Bethany's houses when Bethany and Bloato found them. He told them about Dead Western, a refuge that might take the three of them in. When the trio was stopped by a group of insane hillbillies, he slaughtered them despite Bethany's request to merely tie them up.

== Collections ==
The series has been collected into four trade paperbacks:

- Girl Afraid (collects #1-4)
- Heaven Knows I'm Miserable Now (collects #5-9)
- Paint a Vulgar Picture (collects #10-15)
- Golden Lights (collects #16-18)

In January 2010, Image Comics released the Strange Girl Limited Edition Slipcase Collection, presenting the complete series in a single set of four softcover volumes boxed in an illustrated slipcase with a Strange Girl print illustrated by artist Michael Kaluta, and reportedly signed by series creator Rick Remender in all 1,000 copies of the edition.

In January 2012, the publisher released the Strange Girl Omnibus hardcover edition, presenting the complete series in a single oversized volume.

In September 2015, Image Comics released the Strange Girl Omnibus trade paperback edition, a standard sized reprint of the collection.
