= Cultural impact of Dragon Ball =

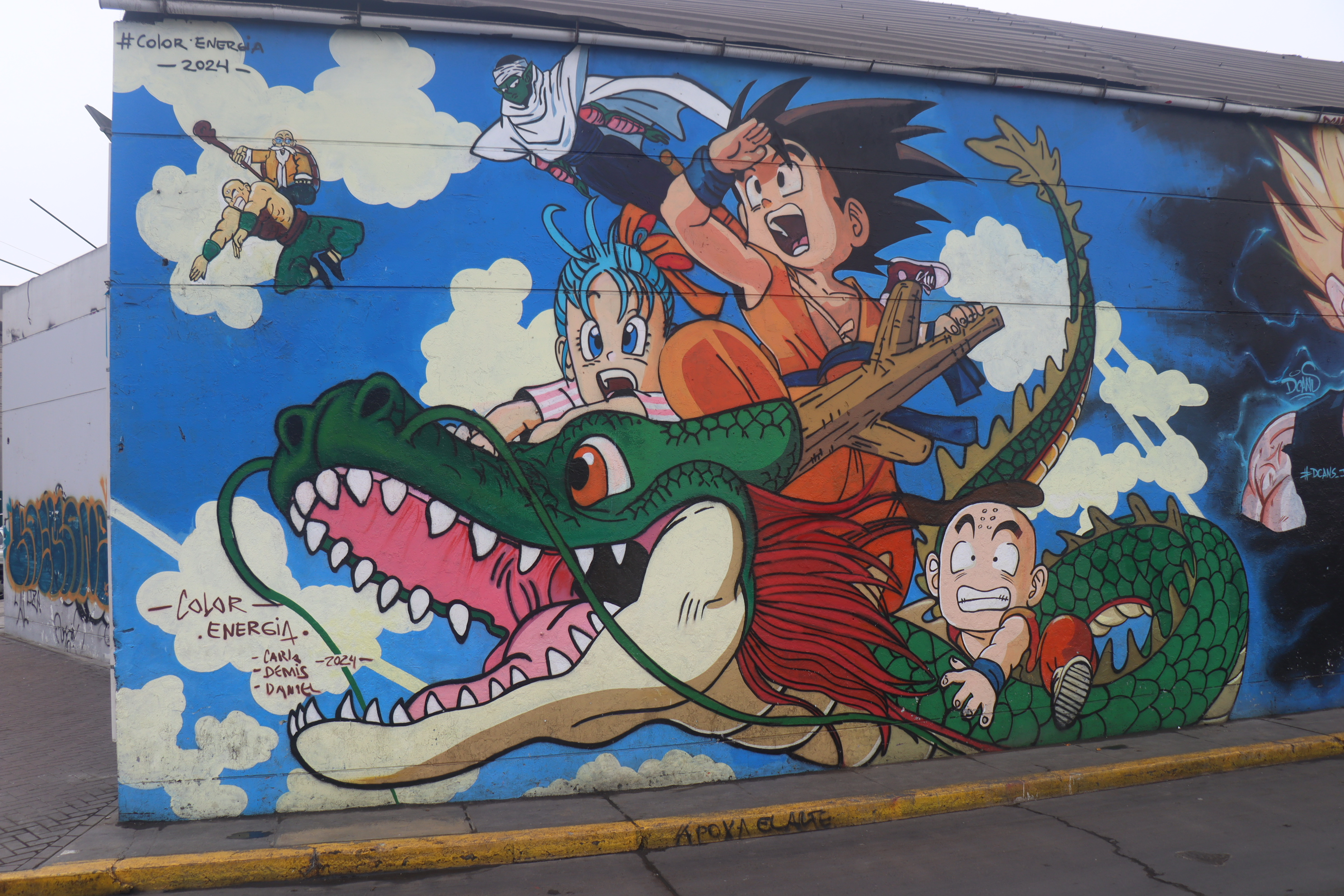
A Dragon Ball-themed mural in Lima, Peru

Since its debut in Japan in 1984, the Dragon Ball franchise by Akira Toriyama has had a considerable impact on global popular culture. In 2015, the Japan Anniversary Association officially declared May 9 as "Goku Day" (Japanese: 悟空の日, Hepburn: Gokū no Hi) after the main character Son Goku; in Japanese, the numbers five and nine can be pronounced as "Go" and "Ku". It is similarly influential in international popular culture across other parts of the world, especially Latin America. Dragon Ball is widely referenced in American popular culture, from television and music to celebrities and athletes, and the series has been celebrated with Goku making an appearance at multiple Macy's Thanksgiving Day Parades, and with murals based on Dragon Ball appearing in cities such as Los Angeles, Chicago, Kansas City, and Denver.

== Fandom ==
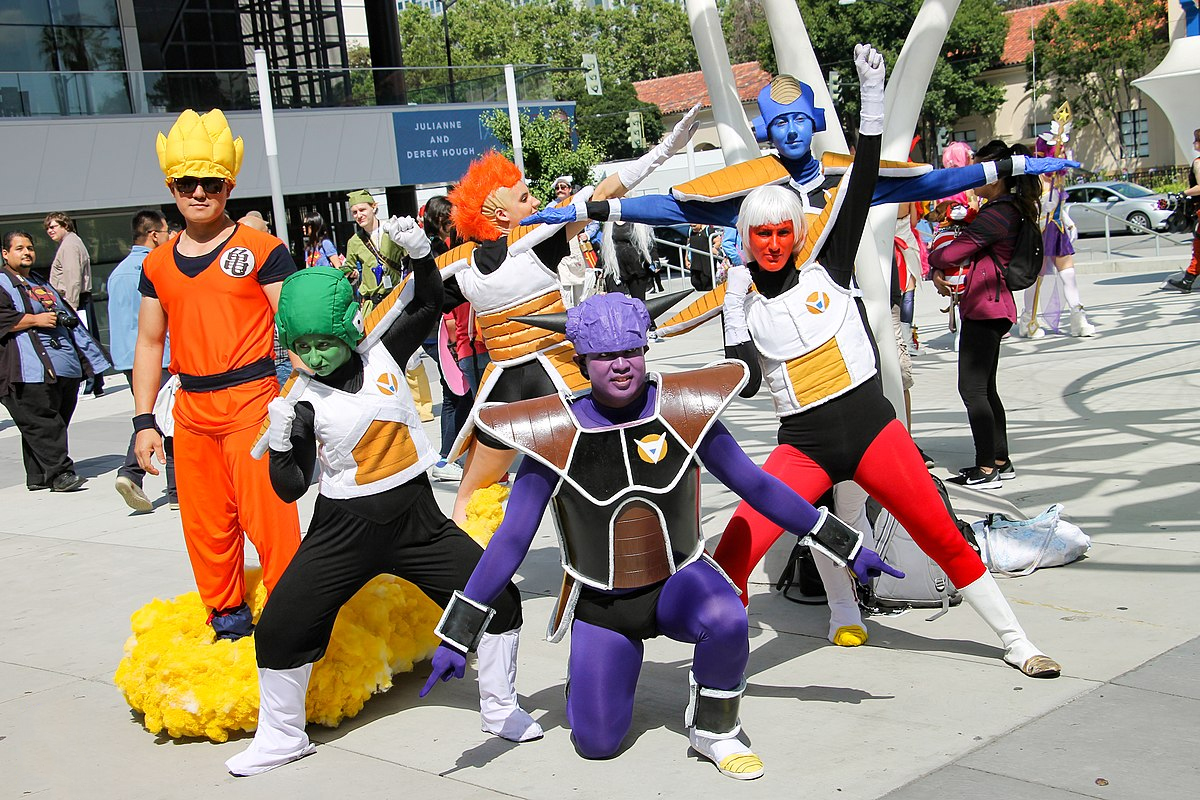
A group of cosplayers dressed as Dragon Ball characters at FanimeCon 2017

Dragon Ball is immensely popular in Latin America, where public screenings of the Dragon Ball Super finale in 2018 filled public spaces and stadiums in cities across the region, including stadiums holding tens of thousands of spectators. Illegal screenings of the 2018 finale even caused a diplomatic incident between Mexico and Japan. Goku has been referred to as "a Latino icon" due to his popularity in Mexico.

Dragon Ball creator Akira Toriyama was decorated a Chevalier (Knight) of the Ordre des Arts et des Lettres by the French government in May 2019 for his contributions to the arts, particularly for Dragon Ball which has been credited with popularizing manga in France.

Vegeta's quote "It's Over 9000!" from the Ocean Dub of Dragon Ball Z is a popular Internet meme among the English-speaking fandom.

== Impact on comics and animation ==
Dragon Ball has been cited as inspiration across various different media. It is credited with setting trends for popular shōnen manga and anime since the 1980s, with manga critic Jason Thompson in 2011 calling it "by far the most influential shōnen manga of the last 30 years." Successful shōnen manga authors such as Eiichiro Oda (One Piece), Masashi Kishimoto (Naruto), Tite Kubo (Bleach), Hiro Mashima (Fairy Tail) and Kentaro Yabuki (Black Cat) have cited Dragon Ball as an influence on their own now popular works. According to Thompson, "almost every Shōnen Jump artist lists it as one of their favorites and lifts from it in various ways."

French comics artist Tony Valente cited Dragon Ball as an influence, especially the adventure aspect of its early portion. Comic book artist André Lima Araújo cited Dragon Ball as a major influence on his work, which includes Marvel Comics such as Age of Ultron, Avengers A.I., Spider-Verse and The Inhumans. Filipino comic artist Dexter Soy, who has worked on comics such as Captain America, cited Dragon Ball as a major inspiration. Tony Stark: Iron Man #11 (2019) makes references to Dragon Ball Z, including Miles Morales as Spider-Man referencing the Super Saiyan transformation.

Ian Jones-Quartey, a producer of the American animated series Steven Universe and creator of OK K.O.! Let's Be Heroes, is a fan of Dragon Ball and Dr. Slump, and uses Toriyama's vehicle designs as a reference for his own. He also stated that "We're all big Toriyama fans on [Steven Universe], which kind of shows a bit." French director Pierre Perifel cited Toriyama and Dragon Ball as influences on his DreamWorks Animation film The Bad Guys.

== Impact on live-action films and television ==
In December 1990, an unofficial live-action Korean film adaptation Dragon Ball: Ssawora Son Goku, Igyeora Son Goku was released. Another unofficial live-action film adaptation of the series, Dragon Ball: The Magic Begins, was released in Taiwan in November 1991. In the Philippines, a children's musical titled Dragon Ball and Dragon Ball Z: Myth, Magic, Music, was staged in June 1996. Hong Kong action film star Jackie Chan is a fan of the franchise, and said Goku is his favorite character. In 1995, Chan had expressed some interest in adapting Dragon Ball into a film, but said it would require "a lot of amazing special effects and an enormous budget." Later in 2013, Toriyama said his ideal live-action Goku would have been a young Jackie Chan, stating that "nobody could play Goku but him."

The Matrix franchise echoes Dragon Ball Z in several action scenes, including the climactic fights of the 2003 films The Matrix Reloaded and The Matrix Revolutions. Filipino-American film storyboard artist Jay Oliva has cited Dragon Ball as a major inspiration on his work, particularly the action scenes of 2013 Superman film Man of Steel, which launched the DC Extended Universe. Several films in the Marvel Cinematic Universe have also been visually influenced by Dragon Ball Z. Erik Killmonger's battle armour in Black Panther (2018) bears a resemblance to Vegeta's battle armour, which actor Michael B. Jordan (himself a Dragon Ball fan) said may have inspired Killmonger's battle armor. The fiery look of Carol Danvers' Binary powers in Captain Marvel (2019) also drew some influence from Dragon Ball Z. In Shang-Chi and the Legend of the Ten Rings (2021), Katy refers to one of Shang-Chi's techniques as a "Kamehameha fireball"; the film's director Destin Daniel Cretton cited Dragon Ball Z as an inspiration behind the film's climactic fight scene.

A key characteristic that set Dragon Ball Z (and later other anime series) apart from American television shows at the time was a serialization format, in which a continuous story arc stretches over multiple episodes or seasons. Serialization has since also become a common characteristic of American live-action streaming television shows during the "Peak TV" era.

== Impact on sports and music ==
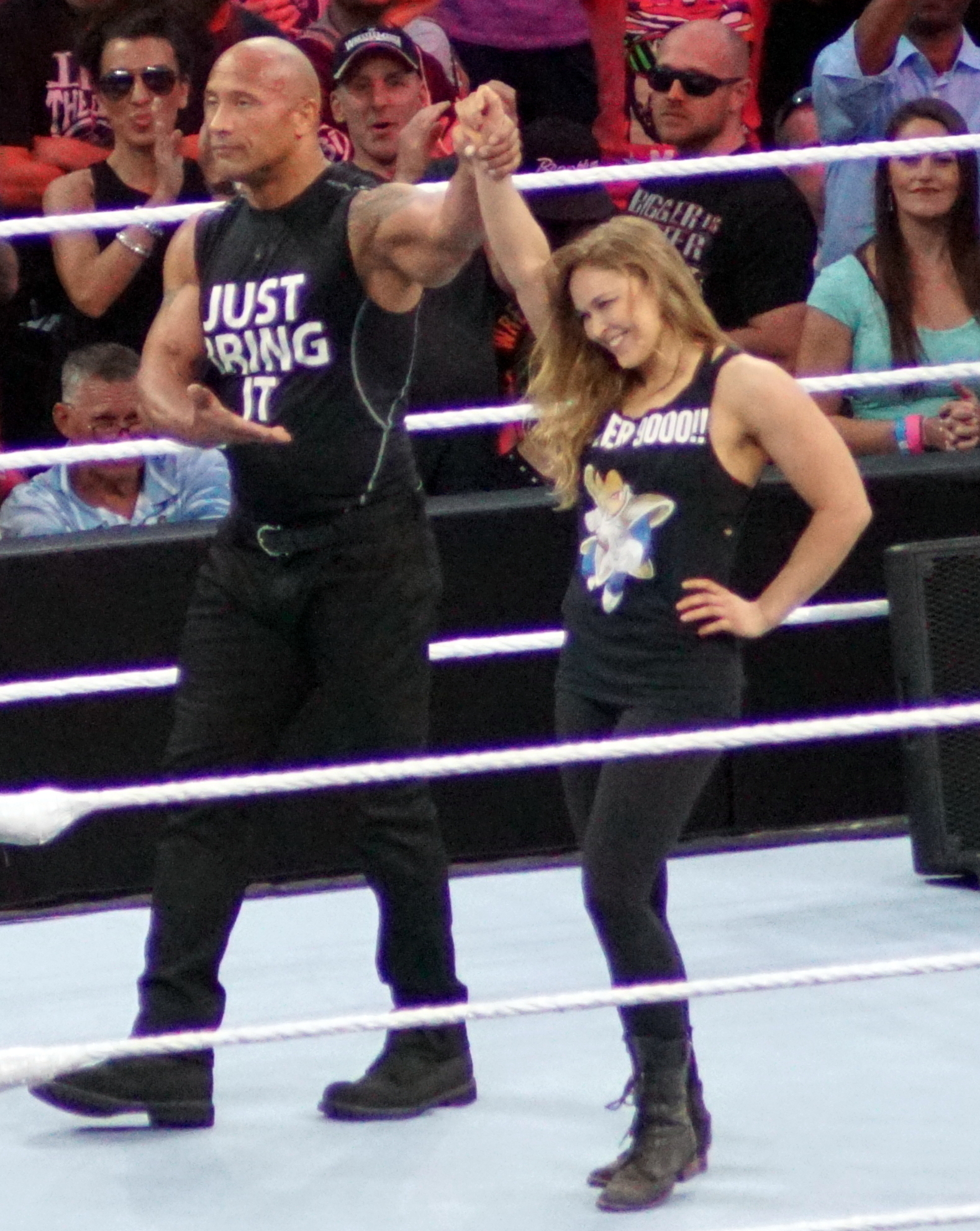
Ronda Rousey (right), wearing a shirt referencing Vegeta and the quote "It's Over 9000!"

As a martial arts series, Dragon Ball has had an impact on martial artists and other athletes. Nobuyuki Sakakibara, the founder of Pride Fighting Championships and Rizin Fighting Federation, noted how the manga depicted a tournament featuring martial artists of various disciplines competing against each other in 1985, before mixed martial arts was coined or established. Mixed martial artists inspired by Dragon Ball include Kana Watanabe, Yushin Okami, Yoshihiro Akiyama, Yuya Wakamatsu, Katsunori Kikuno, and Marcus Brimage. Canadian mixed martial artist Carlos Newton dubbed his fighting style "Dragon Ball jiu-jitsu" in tribute to the series. Japanese mixed martial artist Itsuki Hirata is nicknamed "Android 18" due to her resembling the Dragon Ball character, while Vietnamese martial artist Nguyễn Trần Duy Nhất cited Goku as his inspiration. Similarly, Japanese kickboxer Panchan Rina took her nickname from the Dragon Ball character Pan, and Japanese kickboxer Takeru Segawa cited the series as an influence.

Numerous other athletes have channeled and referenced Dragon Ball, including NBA basketball players such as De'Aaron Fox, Lauri Markkanen, Jordan Bell, and Lonzo Ball, American football NFL players such as Darren Fells and David Njoku, mixed martial artist and professional wrestler Ronda Rousey, and professional wrestlers The New Day. For her appearance at WrestleMania 31 in 2015, Rousey wore a shirt that referenced the character Vegeta and the quote "It's Over 9000!" from an English dub of Dragon Ball Z. For WrestleMania 32 in 2016, The New Day dressed in Saiyan armor in tribute to Dragon Ball Z. The French group Yamakasi cited Dragon Ball as an influence on their development of parkour, inspired by how its heroes attain extraordinary abilities through hard work.

Dragon Ball has also been channeled and referenced by numerous musicians. It is popular in the hip hop community, and has been referenced in numerous songs by rappers and artists such as Chris Brown, Chance the Rapper, Big Sean, Lil Uzi Vert, G-Mo Skee, The Weeknd, Childish Gambino, Denzel Curry, Thundercat, B.o.B, Soulja Boy, Drake, Frank Ocean, and Sese. Mark Sammut of TheGamer notes that Gohan occasionally performed the dab move (as the Great Saiyaman) decades before it became a popular hip-hop dance move in American popular culture.

== Impact on video games ==
The producer of the Tekken video game series, Katsuhiro Harada, said that Dragon Ball was one of the first works to visually depict chi and thereby influenced numerous Japanese video games, especially fighting games such as Tekken and Street Fighter. Masaaki Ishikawa, art director of the video game Arms, said that its art style was largely influenced by Dragon Ball and Akira. French video game designer Éric Chahi also cited Dragon Ball as an influence on his 1991 cinematic platformer Another World. Other video game industry veterans who were inspired by Dragon Ball include Suda51, SWERY, Insomniac Games, Nina Freeman, Heart Machine, Iron Galaxy, and Mega64.

The neologism puff-puff, coined by Toriyama in Dragon Ball, is frequently used in the Dragon Quest video game series, which he was the lead artist of. Due to the term's usage in Dragon Ball and Dragon Quest, it has also been referenced in games such as 3D Dot Game Heroes, Yakuza: Like a Dragon, and Final Fantasy XIV.

== Impact on science and technology ==
After searching for a real-life equivalent to the supernaturally nutritious Senzu seen in Dragon Ball, Mitsuru Izumo founded Euglena Company in 2005 and started making supplements and food products out of Euglena. In 2014, entomologist Enio B. Cano named a new species of beetle Ogyges toriyamai after Toriyama, and another Ogyges mutenroshii, after the Dragon Ball character Muten Roshi. In 2025, researchers named a new species of goby Vanderhorstia supersaiyan after the Super Saiyan transformation seen in Dragon Ball due to the fish's yellow stripes.

The poop emoji was based on Poop-Boy, a character designed by Toriyama that features in the manga Dr. Slump and in Dragon Ball. Motorola's Freescale DragonBall and DragonBall EZ/VZ microcontroller processors, released in 1995, are named after Dragon Ball and Dragon Ball Z, respectively.

== See also ==
- Anime and manga fandom
