= Timothy Green II =

American comic book artist

- Born: 1975 (age 50–51)
- Occupation: Comic book artist
- Years active: 1996 – present
- Notable work: Aeon Flux

Timothy Green II (also credited as Timothy Green or Timothy II) is an American comic book artist who is known for his work on such titles as Fraction, Aeon Flux, Rush City, Annihilation: Conquest – Star-Lord, The Immortal Iron Fist and Generation Hope.

== Influences ==
Growing up, Green read mostly superhero comics until discovering Moebius, whom he now cites as his primary influence, as well as Katsuhiro Otomo, Geof Darrow, J. C. Leyendecker, Gustave Doré, Franklin Booth, Doug Chiang, Koji Morimoto, Olivier Coipel, Joe Madureira, Jim Lee and Art Adams.

== Bibliography ==
Interior comic work includes:

- Leitmotiv #1-2 (script and art, Mythic, 1996)
- Frank Frazetta Fantasy Illustrated #7: "Phantom of Which Opera?" (with Jean-Marc Lofficier, anthology, Quantum Cat, 1999)
- Star Wars Tales (anthology, Dark Horse):
  - "The Secret of Tet Ami" (with Fabian Nicieza, in #13, 2002)
  - "Do or Do Not" (with Jay Laird, in #15, 2003)
- Strangers #3-4: "The Time Brigade: Time Killer" (with Jean-Marc and Randy Lofficier, co-feature, Image, 2003)
- Brigade temporelle: La guerre du Graal (with Jean-Marc and Randy Lofficier, graphic novel, Hexagon, 2004)
- Syn #5: "Synners" (with Keith Giffen, Rocket Comics, 2004)
- Fraction #1-6 (with David Tischman, DC Focus, 2004)
- Swamp Thing vol. 4 #13-14: "A Measure of Faith" (with Joshua Dysart, Vertigo, 2005)
- Aeon Flux #1-4 (with Mike Kennedy, Dark Horse, 2005–2006)
- Rush City #1-6 (with Chuck Dixon, DC Comics, 2006–2007)
- The Dark Horse Book of Monsters: "The Horror Beneath" (with Leah Moore and John Reppion, anthology graphic novel, Dark Horse, 2006)
- Annihilation: Conquest — Star-Lord #1-4 (with Keith Giffen, Marvel, 2007)
- Secret Invasion: Who Do You Trust?: "Agent Brand: In Plain Sight" (with Mike Carey, anthology one-shot, Marvel, 2008)
- Savage World of Sakaar: Son of Hulk (with Greg Pak, Timothy Truman, Carlo Pagulayan and Gabriel Hardman, one-shot, Marvel, 2008)
- The Immortal Iron Fist (with Duane Swierczynski, Marvel):
  - "Wah Sing-Rand and the Mandate of Heaven" (in #21, 2009)
  - "Escape from the Eighth City: Chapter 2" (with Travel Foreman and Tonči Zonjić, in #23, 2009)
  - "The Fall of the House of Rand" (with Travel Foreman and David Lapham, in #27, 2009)
- Immortal Weapons #3: "Urban Legend" (with Rick Spears, anthology, Marvel, 2009)
- Ender's Game (one-shots, Marvel):
  - Recruiting Valentine (with Jake Black, 2009)
  - War of Gifts (with Jake Black, 2010)
  - The League War (with Jordan D. White, 2010)
- X-Men: Curse of the Mutants — Blade: "The Light at the End" (with Duane Swierczynski, one-shot, Marvel, 2010)
- Fear Itself: Fearsome Four #4: "The Only Thing We Have to Fear is..." (with Brandon Montclare, R. A. Height and Michael Kaluta, Marvel, 2011)
- Iron Man 2: Nick Fury, Director of S.H.I.E.L.D.: "Who Made Who" (with Joe Casey, digital, Marvel, 2011)
- Wolverine #1000: "Last Ride of the Devil's Brigade" (with Rick Spears, anthology, Marvel, 2011)
- Rocket Raccoon & Groot (with Dan Abnett and Andy Lanning, co-feature, Marvel):
  - "Back to the Roots" (in Annihilators #1-4, 2011)
  - "Batteries Not Included" (in Annihilators: Earthfall #1-4, 2011–2012)
- Generation Hope #15 (with James Asmus, Marvel, 2012)
- Animal Man vol. 2 (with Jeff Lemire, DC Comics):
  - "Endless Rot" (in Annual #1, 2012)
  - "Rotworld" (with Steve Pugh, in #13-17, 2012)
  - "Tights, Part Two" (with John Paul Leon, in #20, 2013)
- Red Hood and the Outlaws #12-13, 15-16 (with Scott Lobdell, DC Comics, 2012–2013)
- Avengers Academy #32-33: "What the Heart Wants" (with Christos Gage, Marvel, 2012)
- Birds of Prey vol. 3 #11: "Tangled Up Inside" (with Duane Swierczynski and Travel Foreman, DC Comics, 2012)
- Ultimate Comics: The Ultimates #14: "Divided We Fall, Part Two" (with Sam Humphries and Billy Tan, Marvel, 2012)
- Threshold #6-8: "Star Hawkins Case File #237: What Becomes a Legend?" (with Keith Giffen, co-feature, DC Comics, 2013)
- Scarlet Spider #22: "Into the Grave, Part Two" (with Christopher Yost, Erik Burnham, David Baldeon and Patrick Olliffe, Marvel, 2013)
- The Amazing Spider-Man #700.3-700.4: "The Black Lodge" (with Joe Casey, co-feature, Marvel, 2014)
- Avengers Undercover #3, 6, 9 (with Dennis Hopeless, Marvel, 2014)
- Justice League United #5: "The Midayo and the Whitago" (with Jeff Lemire, DC Comics, 2014)
- Convergence: Supergirl — Matrix #1-2: "Buggin'" (with Keith Giffen, DC Comics, 2015)
- Justice League 3001 #12: "Cancelled!" (with Keith Giffen, J. M. DeMatteis and Colleen Doran, DC Comics, 2016)
- Cyborg vol. 2 #4: "The Imitation of Life, Part Four: Mind Maze" (with John Semper, DC Comics, 2017)
- Trollhunters: Tales of Arcadia―The Secret History of Trollkind (with Marc Guggenheim and Richard Hamilton, Dark Horse, 2018)

=== Covers only ===
- Ender's Shadow: Battle School #1 (Marvel, 2009)
- Ender's Shadow: Command School #1-5 (Marvel, 2009–2010)
- The Hypernaturals #1-4 (Boom! Studios, 2012)
- Higher Earth #2 (Boom! Studios, 2012)
- Earth 2 #27 (DC Comics, 2014)
- Justice League 3001 #6 (DC Comics, 2016)
- Detective Comics vol. 2 #48 (DC Comics, 2016)
- Teen Titans vol. 5 #16 (DC Comics, 2016)
- Bloodshot Reborn #17 (Valiant, 2016)
- StarCraft: Scavengers #1 (Dark Horse, 2018)
