= 9001 =

9001 may mean:

- AD 9001, the first year of the 10th millennium
- 9001 BC, the last year of the 10th millennium BC
- 9001 (number), a natural number succeeding 9000 and preceding 9002
- The standard ISO 9001
- A reference to the "It's Over 9000!" meme
- The number 9001

== See also ==
- 90001
