= Rush City (comics) =

Comic book limited series

- Rush City #0, cover art by Joe Ng.

Publication information
- Publisher: DC Comics
- Schedule: Monthly
- Format: Limited Series
- Publication date: September 2006–07
- No. of issues: 6
- Main character: Rush

Creative team
- Created by: Chuck Dixon; Joe Ng and Timothy Green II

Rush City is a six-issue comic book limited series published monthly by DC Comics from September 2006 until 2007. The series is written by Chuck Dixon with illustrations by Timothy Green II colored by Jose Villarrubia. DC Comics produced a special Zero issue web-comic that is available on the DC Comics website, and was packaged with the August 2006 issue of the GamePro magazine. The title features Diego Zhao, an Asian American private investigator who goes by the street name of Rush. Although the series is a crime drama, it does however take place within the continuity of the greater DC Universe.

== Summary ==
As illustrated in the web comic, Diego was once a respected firefighter in Brooklyn, New York. One evening, Diego and his fiancée, Maggie Flynn, decided to spend an evening out on the town, leaving Maggie's daughter Sam at home with a babysitter. Coming home later that evening, the inebriated Zhao discovered Maggie's apartment building on fire. He rushed into the burning building to rescue Sam, but the flames were too intense. Sam died, and Diego suffered massive burns that placed him into a coma for two months.

When he awakened, the guilt of losing his would-be stepdaughter consumed him. He dedicated himself towards helping others and became a privatized hero calling himself Rush.

Rumors of this mysterious new urban hero, Rush, began circulating throughout the city. Unfortunates in need began to admire him, and underworld figures learned to fear him. Anonymous posters circulated the city streets and alleys exclaiming, "Lost Someone? U Need Rush".

In one of his first recorded cases, Rush came into the employ of a woman named Syrese Daly. Syrese hired him to find her missing daughter, Aminta. Aminta was not only missing, but she was also diabetic. Without access to her regularly scheduled insulin injections, the nine-year-old girl had less than twenty-four hours to live.

Rush investigated the matter and learned that she was last seen in the company of a strange man in a nearby music outlet. He tracked the man to his home only to discover that he had since sold the girl to a criminal named Moto. Rush clashed with Moto on the streets of Brooklyn, but succeeded in rescuing the young girl in time. He brought her safely to Bellevue Hospital and reunited Aminta with her mother.
