= Vision (Marvel Comics) =

Comic book superhero

- Vision taken from the variant cover of Avengers #4 (April 2017). Originally drawn by the character's co-creator Sal Buscema for the corner box of the first volume of the comic book series (1963 - 1996) and painted over by Joe Jusko.

Publication information
- Publisher: Marvel Comics
- First appearance: Avengers #57 (August 1968)
- Created by: Roy Thomas (writer); John Buscema (artist)

In-story information
- Species: Android
- Place of origin: Brooklyn, New York
- Team affiliations: Avengers; West Coast Avengers; Avengers A.I. Defenders; Mighty Avengers; New Avengers
- Partnerships: Scarlet Witch (ex-wife); Viv Vision (daughter)
- Notable aliases: Victor Shade
- Abilities: Superhuman strength, stamina, durability, speed, intelligence, and senses; Solar energy absorption and projection; Holographic disguise; Dimensional tunneling; Possession; Cyberpathy; Mechanical Regeneration; Flight; Nanotech mimicry; Invisibility; Living database

The Vision is a superhero appearing in American comic books published by Marvel Comics. Created by Roy Thomas and artist John Buscema, the character first appeared in The Avengers #57 (published in August 1968). The Vision is loosely based on the Timely Comics character of the same name who was an alien from another dimension. The character is an android (sometimes called a "synthezoid") built by the villainous robot Ultron created by Hank Pym. Originally intended to act as Ultron's "son" and destroy the Avengers, Vision instead turned on his creator and joined the Avengers to fight for the forces of good. Since then, he has been depicted as a frequent member of the team, and, for a time, was married to his teammate Scarlet Witch. He also served as a member of the Defenders, and is the father of Viv Vision.

The Vision was created from a copy of the original Human Torch, a synthetic man created by Phineas T. Horton. Ultron took this inert android and added more advanced technology to it, as well as new programming of his own design and a copy of human brainwave patterns. The result was the Vision, a synthezoid driven by logic, but possessing emotions and being able to achieve emotional growth. As an android, the Vision has a variety of abilities and super-powers. In the 1989 story "Vision Quest", Vision was dismantled, then was rebuilt with a chalk-white appearance and now lacked the capacity for emotions. A greater understanding of emotions was regained in 1991, his original red appearance was restored in 1993, and his full personality and emotional connections to memories were restored in 1994 in his first self-titled limited series, Vision. Another four-issue limited series, Avengers Icons: The Vision, was published in late 2002. From 2015 to 2016, Vision had his own series again written by Tom King, during which he attempted to live in the suburbs with an android family, of which the only surviving member, his daughter Viv Vision, then joins the Champions, whom Vision oversees.

Since his conception, the character has been adapted into several forms of media outside comics. Paul Bettany plays Vision in the Marvel Cinematic Universe films Avengers: Age of Ultron (2015), Captain America: Civil War (2016), and Avengers: Infinity War (2018), the television miniseries WandaVision (2021) and VisionQuest (2026), as well as the animated series What If...? (2021).

== Publication history ==
=== Creation and development ===
While working as the writer of the superhero-team series Avengers, Roy Thomas wanted to add a new character to the roster. A great fan of Golden Age heroes, he first thought to bring back Aarkus, a 1940s hero who had been called the Vision due to his spectral appearance and smoke-based abilities. This original Vision had appeared in stories published by Timely Comics, the company that later rebranded as Marvel Comics. Roy Thomas discussed the matter with Marvel editor Stan Lee, who co-created the Avengers team with artist Jack Kirby. Lee enjoyed the idea of a new member, but did not want it to be an alien or visitor from another dimension. After he suggested creating a new character entirely and that it could be an android instead, Thomas compromised by creating a new android character who resembled Aarkus and also called himself Vision.

Thomas spoke further into the design by stating, "I suspect I suggested a cowl instead of a bald head, although the jewel on his forehead (now so important in the films) may have been either my idea or, I suspect, a design element tossed in by John. I did ask him to give Vision a chest symbol a diamond as a focal point, because he could make his body as hard as diamond. I took that from the WWII comic hero Spy-Smasher"

The character has a capacity for emotions but is primarily driven by logic and curiosity. Unused to emotions and how they could influence his behavior, he would be at times guarded or unsure how to express himself. His personality has been compared with Spock from Star Trek, but Thomas said he was barely aware of the TV series at the time and was influenced by the Adam Link character created by Otto Binder, one of the first fictional robots treated as a sympathetic character rather than only a mechanical tool or a monster. Artist John Buscema designed the character by adjusting the appearance of Aarkus. Originally, Thomas wanted the character to be colored chalk-white, befitting his ghostly name. Printing limitations of the time would have rendered him colorless by leaving that portion of the page un-inked rather than using white ink, meaning it would be more vulnerable to smudges because images and text on the other side of the page would possibly be visible and seem to overlap the character. Thomas and Buscema settled on giving the character a colorful costume and red skin. The original Vision, Aarkus, had been depicted with light green or sometimes light blue skin in his original comics. Red was chosen for the new android character because Thomas believed Marvel readers had gotten used to blue skin indicating a member of the Atlantean race, while green skin could bring comparisons to the Hulk.

=== 1960s and 1970s ===
The android Vision first appeared in The Avengers #57 (published in August 1968 but with a cover date indicating October). The cover of the issue was an homage to the first page of the first comic story to feature Aarkus. When Thomas created Ultron, he gave the robot an origin of having been created by Dr. Hank Pym and then turning on his creator. Thomas mirrored this by having Ultron create the Vision to be his son and ally, only to then have the new android join his enemies, the Avengers. To cement the character was not truly as cold and emotionless as he might appear, and that the stories would not treat him as if he were, The Avengers #58 included a scene where, after realizing he has been accepted by the Avengers not only as a new teammate but as a person, Vision excuses himself and silently cries.

Vision appeared with Spider-Man in Marvel Team-Up #5 (1972), "A Passion of the Mind", in which they defeat a giant robot scout from the Kree-Skrull War that was interfering with Vision's brain waves.

In The Avengers #75 (1970), Wanda Maximoff (the Scarlet Witch) rejoins the team with her brother Pietro (Quicksilver). Over time, Wanda became a love interest for Vision. Thomas recounted, "I felt that a romance of some sort would help the character development in The Avengers, and the Vision was a prime candidate because he appeared only in that mag... as did Wanda, for that matter. So they became a pair, for just such practical considerations. It would also, I felt, add to the development I was doing on the Vision's attempting to become 'human.'"

Originally, Thomas considered the Vision to be an android entirely created by Ultron. Later, Ultron had built the Vision from the body of the original Human Torch, who had been described in his Golden Age stories as a perfect, synthetic replica of a human being. Thomas only planted a vague clue to this in The Avengers #93 before leaving the series as writer. This aspect of the Vision's origin was finally revealed in The Avengers #134–135 (1975). Writer Steve Englehart explained, "That plot was well known in-house for years, and since Roy [Thomas] and Neal [Adams] hadn't had a chance to do it, I did it on my watch with Roy's blessing."

After learning that he had once been the original Human Torch in another life, Vision felt a stronger sense of identity. Englehart then had Vision and Scarlet Witch marry in Giant-Size Avengers #4 (June 1975).

However, in a story written for the "What If...." anthology but intended to be in continuity, Thomas suggested that the Vision was actually built by Ultron from a different android that, like the Human Torch, had been designed and built by Phineas Horton, known as Adam II.

=== 1980s ===
Years later, the couple starred in their first limited series called The Vision and the Scarlet Witch #1–4 (Nov. 1982 – Feb. 1983), by writer Bill Mantlo and penciller Rick Leonardi. The mini-series showed Vision and Wanda moving into a house in Leonia, New Jersey, hoping to strengthen their marriage by enjoying a life and experiences outside of the Avengers. This was followed by a second limited series that lasted 12 issues (Oct. 1985 – Sept. 1986), written by Steve Englehart and penciled by Richard Howell. Despite their previous home being burned down by people who consider the marriage of an android and a mutant to be unnatural, Vision and Wanda move back to Leonia and again attempt to live a suburban life outside of their duties as superheroes. The series cemented that the Vision and Simon Williams (Wonder Man) now regarded each other as twin brothers, since part of Vision's programming was based on the brainwave pattern of Simon. Early in the series, the Scarlet Witch is captured by a community of sorcerers who engage in a magical ritual that goes wrong, loosing deadly magical energy. To contain the loosed forces, the Scarlet Witch channels this powerful magical energy and is able to use it to grant herself a wish for a family. She becomes pregnant and nine months later gives birth to twin boys, Thomas and William ("Billy").

Englehart later took over as writer for the Avengers spin-off series West Coast Avengers, featuring a new branch of the team that was based in Los Angeles. Having grown fond of Vision and Wanda, he added them to the Avengers West team. Later on, John Byrne took over as writer/penciller for West Coast Avengers (which would soon be retitled Avengers West Coast). Byrne believed it was a mistake to give an android character emotions and to give him and Wanda a family. His "Vision Quest" story in West Coast Avengers #42–45 (March – June 1989) had the Vision dismantled, his human brain patterns wiped out, and his artificial skin rendered chalk-white (modern printing techniques and paper meant it was now more feasible to give a character chalk-white skin or costumes). Rather than portray the Vision as a synthetic man, Byrne depicted his parts as purely robotic and his skin as a costume-like shell. Journalist Karen Walker later commented, "This image alone has probably done more to shape how future writers (and readers) perceive the character than anything before or since. Once seen broken down into component parts, it's hard to truly move past that image and think of Vision as a synthetic man, not a machine."

Vision's memories were restored but not his emotions. As such, he could no longer reciprocate Wanda's feelings or even express love for his children, which led to the annulment of their marriage. Byrne then went further, undoing the Vision's origin by revealing he was not the original Torch. The same issue depicted the original Human Torch being reactivated and meeting the Vision face to face. Following this, Byrne revealed that the children of Vision and Wanda were not real, explaining that Scarlet Witch had suffered a "hysterical pregnancy" and her temporarily increased power had projected this desire for children into creating imaginary constructs. The children were then wiped from existence. Further trauma led to Wanda becoming catatonic soon afterward. Rather than nurse his wife, Vision left Avengers West, concluding he could not help Wanda further and his presence would be more useful as a member of the NYC based team. Byrne also had Vision refuse an offer by Wonder Man to restore human brain patterns to his mind, possibly restoring his capacity for emotions in the process.

=== 1990s ===
In Avengers Spotlight #40 (1991), Vision realized a human brainwave pattern was necessary for his operation and gained one based on deceased research scientist Alex Lipton. This restored some of Vision's capacity for emotion and empathy. The same story featured Vision gaining a personal holographic projector so he could assume the guise of an average person and mingle with humanity more to learn a greater understanding of people. This identity was called "Victor Shade."

Marvel later decided to restore the Vision's original red-skinned appearance. To do this, an emotional and villainous Vision from a parallel timeline was introduced as member of the Gatherers, a new group of enemies to the Avengers. This alternate Vision (sometimes called Anti-Vision) infiltrated the Avengers team by exchanging his mind with the heroic Vision. After another battle with the Gatherers, the Anti-Vision escaped, still housed in the chalk-white body. The heroic Vision returned to the Avengers, now once again with red-colored skin. This occurred in The Avengers #360-363, by writer Bob Harras and artists Steve Epting and Tom Palmer.

In late 1994, Harras and penciller Manny Clark produced the first Vision limited series, lasting 4 issues. The series featured Vision suffering a mental breakdown, as his original personality (based on the brainwaves of Wonder Man) began to emerge and clash with the Adam Lipton emotions. After fighting the Anti-Vision again, Vision found mental and emotional balance again, now with full emotional capacity restored. Later on, he revealed that this also meant he had regained the emotions tied to his memories from before being dismantled, including his feelings for Wanda.

=== 2000s and 2010s ===
A four-issue series, Avengers Icons: The Vision, was published in late 2002, written by Geoff Johns and penciled by Ivan Reis. The mini-series features Vision meeting people related to Phineas Horton, the original Human Torch's creator. Vision considers these people to now be his family.

The story arc Avengers Disassembled features the Vision being destroyed. The story includes an explanation that he was damaged beyond repair. Soon afterward, the original Young Avengers series introduced a new Vision, whose personality was created by a combination of the synthezoid Vision's programming and mental engrams of the hero Iron Lad. It is later revealed that the Young Avengers members Wiccan and Speed are teenage reincarnations of Wanda and Vision's children Billy and Thomas, indicating they might have been real all along.

The original android Vision is fully rebuilt and restored in The Avengers vol. 4 #19 in 2012 and once again becomes a regular star of the series. After the series is cancelled in 2013, Vision becomes the star of the series Avengers A.I. where he joins a team of fellow synthetic and cybernetically enhanced beings, including the cyborg Victor Mancha, another "son" of Ultron.

Vision again appeared in a 12-issueVision series published from November 2015 to October 2016. The series features him creating an android wife and two android children in another attempt to live a happy, family life in the suburbs. This attempt largely ends in failure. A later encounter with the Hulk leads to the Vision's destruction again in Avengers #685. He is later rebuilt but his core remains damaged, meaning he will eventually die. In Champions vol. 2 #22, Vision concludes life is meant to be finite. Later, Vision is fully healed due to the energies of the House of Ideas in Avengers No Road Home #9-10.

== Fictional character biography ==
Debut of the Silver Age Vision: The Avengers #57 (Oct. 1968). Cover pencils by John Buscema.

Founding member of the Avengers and scientist/adventurer Hank Pym (also known by the code names Ant-Man, Giant-Man, and Goliath) decides to experiment with creating artificial intelligence, using a combination of computer programming and recordings of human brainwave patterns. Hank's hope is to create a robot who does not just simulate emotions but can truly feel and achieve emotional growth. His work results in the creation of a robot called Ultron who immediately turns on him and escapes.

Ultron then upgrades himself repeatedly, finally creating a formidable robotic form which can allow him to do battle. Seeing himself as superior to humanity and wishing to dominate Earth, Ultron quickly becomes a powerful archenemy of the Avengers, attacking them both on his own and through the use of agents such as the Masters of Evil team. Ultron's first ally is Eric Williams, the Grim Reaper, who blames the Avengers for the death of his brother Simon, the ionically empowered hero Wonder Man (Eric and the Avengers were unaware at the time that Wonder Man was alive and only in a coma-like state). Inspired by how strongly Eric is motivated by his connection to his brother, Ultron decides to create a companion who, like him, is capable of emotional growth.

To create an android "son", Ultron first tracks down the body of the original android Human Torch, a Golden Age hero and android described by his creator Phineas T. Horton as a "synthetic man" replicating the physiology of an adult human male with synthetic organs, blood, tissue, muscle, and skeleton. Unknown to the living robot, the time traveling Immortus uses his powers to duplicate the original Torch moments before Ultron's arrival, creating twin copies. While Ultron takes one deactivated Human Torch back to his lab, the other deactivated Human Torch remains behind, waiting to be reactivated. Immortus did this as part of larger plans he had to manipulate the Avengers.

In his lab, Ultron adds robotic technology of his own design to his copy of the android Torch, creating a new artificial life form with a physical appearance and abilities different from the original Torch. Primarily, this android is able to absorb and expel solar radiation and control his body's density. Ultron then copies Pym's method of replicating human brainwaves and, in recognition of his being inspired by the Grim Reaper, bases his creation's personality program on the brainwave patterns of Wonder Man. When the android is brought online, he knows Ultron to be his creator but does not know about his connection to the original Human Torch.

Ultron sends his son (who he leaves unnamed) to Avengers Mansion. Wasp witnesses the android moving through the mansion and is startled, describing the intruder as a ghostly "vision." After battling and studying the Avengers, the android concludes they are good people whereas Ultron is corrupt. Taking the name Vision, the android aids the Avengers and turns against Ultron. The Avengers learn how Ultron created him and that he is arguably alive, his programming based on mimicking a human mind. Due to his mixture of robotics and synthetic organs, Hank Pym later remarks it would be more accurate to call Vision a "synthezoid." Seeing him as a person, and perhaps because of the team's past successes with recruiting former villains and criminals wishing to atone for past actions, the Avengers welcome the android to the team. Overwhelmed by this act of acceptance from the group, Vision immediately excuses himself and weeps.

An alternate account of the Vision's origin includes Wasp explaining that starting a new life and finding a new identity can involve imagining "a vision" of the person you aspire to be and then trying to reach it. Affected by these words, this becomes why the android chooses his name. Yet another account suggests that the name came from a memory of Horton's prototype, a robot he created before perfecting the original Human Torch. This prototype had been nicknamed "the vision of tomorrow."

While he is with the Avengers, Vision proves a valuable member and a loyal teammate. The villain Grim Reaper takes an interest in Vision, seeing him as his brother Simon resurrected. When the Reaper offers to transfer the Vision's mind into the comatose body of Captain America, making him truly human, Vision is uninterested but plays along to defeat him later. After multiple encounters, the Grim Reaper develops a hatred for Vision, seeing him as a mockery of his dead brother.

Not long after joining the team, Vision is controlled by his "father" Ultron due to a control crystal the villain implanted in his son's synthetic brain (though Vision does not learn about the presence of this crystal until years later). Vision is forced to rebuild the robot villain, giving him a body of near-indestructible adamantium, and then battles the Avengers. Eventually, Vision regains control of himself and Ultron is defeated. Soon afterward, the former Avengers known as Wanda Maximoff, the Scarlet Witch, and her twin brother Pietro Maximoff, Quicksilver, rejoin the team. Wanda and Vision begin forming a friendship. At times, Vision suspects he is developing feelings for Wanda but then quickly denies this, believing that even an android who has some emotional capacity is not capable of having a romantic relationship with a human. Despite this, he grows fiercely protective of his teammates and Wanda in particular.

During the Kree–Skrull War, Vision realizes he can hide his feelings no longer and admits them to Wanda. Feeling the same for him, Wanda kisses Vision and the two become romantically involved despite the protests of Quicksilver, who believes an android cannot truly love, and Hawkeye, who has his own feelings for Wanda. Eventually, Hawkeye, as well as the other Avengers, come to agree the two make a happy couple.

During an encounter between the Avengers and Immortus, Vision learns he was apparently constructed from the remains of the original Human Torch. This information gives him a stronger sense of identity when he realizes that he technically has a "past", even though he does not recall being the android Torch and acknowledges having a different personality. Soon afterward, Vision and Wanda are married. Soon afterward, Simon Williams is discovered to be alive due to being powered by ionic energy; his "death" having been mistaken due to his altered biology. As Wonder Man, he joins the team and learns an android had been programmed with a copy of his brainwaves. Wonder Man befriends the Vision and the two come to regard each other as twin brothers, just as Wanda and Pietro are twin siblings.

Some time later, realizing they have never had a life together that did not involve the Avengers, Wanda and Vision take a leave of absence from the team and buy a house together in the suburbs of Leonia, New Jersey. After several months, Vision feels he and Wanda should return to active duty and the two do so. During a battle with the villain Annihilus, Vision suffers serious damage and "shuts down." Regaining consciousness weeks later, he remains paralyzed and communicates for a time through a holographic form. Connection with ISAAC, a computer system created by advanced Eternal science, helps Vision eventually repair and regain control of his body. Vision recognizes that the presence of Ultron's control crystal in his brain has inhibited the full potential of his emotional growth. With this limitation removed, Vision's mind evolves as he becomes aware of humanity's evil. Overwhelmed with feelings of guilt and disgust he has never experienced before, he becomes obsessed with world peace. To help his plan, he manipulates the Wasp into giving up her position as leader of the Avengers so he can take the position for himself. His increasingly irrational state leads to him manipulating and lying to the Avengers for months, while causing tension in his marriage.

As Vision ponders whether or not his plan will actually help, he and Wanda learn their home in Leonia has been burnt down by bigots who objected to the presence of a mutant (Wanda was mistakenly believed to be a mutant at the time) and her android husband. Taking the arson as a sign, Vision acts on his plan and temporarily takes control of various computer systems, weapons systems, and government databases across Earth. Doing so causes Vision great mental strain; he quickly realizes that what he has done his wrong and that the crystal is negatively influencing his emotional judgment. After the Avengers help disrupt his control over Earth's computers, Vision reaches into his own body and takes out the control crystal. Able to think clearly again, he apologizes for his actions and resigns from the Avengers, along with Wanda. To spare the Avengers military retaliation, Vision reveals only part of the truth to the US government, saying the loss of control they experienced was a malfunction he alone caused and that the Avengers were equally victimized by his actions, adding that he is prepared to accept the consequences. This convinces the international community that Vision and the Avengers are not an active threat, but several government operatives from different countries do not trust the situation and decide to collectively monitor the android.

After buying a new house in Leonia, Vision expresses his hope that one day he and Wanda can have a family. Later on, Wanda is brought to New Salem, a community of sorcerers. The villainous magic-users in charge perform a ceremony they hope will vastly increase their powers. Wanda taps into the immense mystical power herself and is about to release it harmlessly, when she hears the voice of her deceased teacher, the sorceress Agatha Harkness, telling her to use the power before she gives it up. Wanda thinks of her desire for children with Vision, then releases the excess magical energy. Soon afterward, she discovers she is pregnant. Months later, Wanda goes into labor and the sorcerer Dr. Strange delivers her twin children Thomas and William ("Billy"), named after Phineas Horton (middle name Thomas) and Simon Williams.

=== White Vision ===
Not long afterward, Vision and Wanda join the new West Coast branch of the Avengers, based in Los Angeles. Realizing this means Vision again has access to advanced computer systems and federal databases, the operatives who have been observing him secretly agree this makes him a threat. What's more, there is growing concern Vision's mind may have accessed - and still possesses - classified data. With help from rogue agents of the American government, the operatives arrange for Vision's capture, dismantle him, and wipe his mind's programming. The Avengers recover Vision, rebuild him, and restore his experiential memories, but his skin color is now chalk-white and his personality and emotions are missing.

Despite having earlier appreciated Vision as a brother, Wonder Man now refuses to allow his brain patterns to provide the basis for Vision's personality again and allow him to recover his emotions, arguing that this was done without his consent before and he resents it as an act that "ripped out" a part of his soul. Privately, Wonder Man also admits he has feelings for Wanda and now selfishly does not want to help Vision reunite with his wife. Wanda's efforts to find help elsewhere lead to her being mind controlled by a parasitic force called That Which Endures, causing her to temporarily become a villain and act against the Avengers.

Following this, Hank Pym concludes that Vision could not possibly be the original Human Torch (a conclusion later revealed to be the influence of Immortus again). Investigating the matter, the Avengers discover the other Human Torch android that Ultron had left behind. Wanda's hex magic reactivates it and Vision meets the android Torch, who he considers his true "brother".

Wanda is traumatized by her husband no longer being able to love her or reciprocate her love, and is further unnerved to learn that what she knew of his origins might be a lie. She then learns that her children Thomas and Billy are evidently not real but rather magical constructs she herself created due to a "hysterical pregnancy" and an unexplained increase in her magical abilities. The demon lord Mephisto seemingly wipes the children from existence. Wanda also loses her memory of the children's existence. Immediately afterward, Wanda once again falls under mind control during Atlantis Attacks. Though she regains control, the stress of the last few weeks causes her to become nonverbal and unresponsive.

At this point, a guilt-ridden Simon at last offers his brain patterns to restore Vision's emotions. The android declines, saying he is now a different entity than the one who existed before being dismantled, and getting these brain waves would not restore the original Vision back but would only create a copy programmed to mimic him. Unable to emotionally comfort Wanda and believing he would be more useful to the main Avengers East team, Vision leaves Avengers West. It is later confirmed that the two annul their marriage after Wanda recovers, as the new Vision feels it inappropriate to take the place of his deceased predecessor.

While Vision works with Avengers East, Wanda regains the memory of her children during a battle with Immortus, who was responsible for manipulating recent events in her life and increasing her power. Glad to remember her twins even if they are gone, Wanda spends some time learning to cope with the loss.

=== Vision restored ===
Vision's experiences convince him that he needs a purpose beyond what the Avengers can provide. He seeks out help from scientist Miles Lipton, an expert in artificial intelligence and philosophies regarding consciousness. Lipton upgrades Vision with a holographic projector so he can disguise himself as a human, "Victor Shade", and mingle with humanity to learn more about them. When Vision continues to show mental stress, Lipton learns the android's mind requires a replicated human brain pattern for his operating system to properly function. Lipton thus uploads a program based on the brain patterns and memory recordings of his deceased son Alex. As a result, Vision's mental strain is alleviated and he regains some understanding of emotion, as well as a greater capacity for empathy.

The Avengers fight a group of enemies called the Gatherers, one of whom is an overtly emotional and corrupt Vision who still has red-colored skin and is native to a parallel Earth. This other Vision (later called "Anti-Vision") infiltrates the Avengers by exchanging minds with the heroic Vision. While the Anti-Vision operates with the Avengers, now housed in the chalk-white body, the heroic Vision awakens in a red-skinned body identical to his original form, now a prisoner of the Gatherers. Eventually, he is freed but Anti-Vision escapes before they can exchange minds again.

Soon after having his original appearance restored, Vision experiences nightmares and then suffers a temporary break from reality, convincing himself he is a 1930s movie style private detective named Simon Williams. He realizes Ultron's design included a back-up of Wonder Man's brain patterns, a back-up which is now activating and clashing with those of Alex Lipton. After defeating the Anti-Vision, who was responsible for his nightmares, Vision is able to reassert his identity and the different aspects of his mind merge, restoring his original personality. Vision takes a leave of absence from the Avengers to properly adjust. Returning to the Avengers team later, he approaches Wanda, who realizes that his capacity for emotions has been restored. When Vision broaches the subject, Wanda becomes guarded and tells him that their relationship is in the past. Vision decides not to explain to her he has also regained the emotions tied to his memories from before he was dismantled, deciding he has hurt Wanda enough. When Wanda later officially rejoins the main Avengers team, the two are tense around each other but Pietro Maximoff, having also returned and now regretful of his treatment of Vision in the past, attempts to reconnect them as friends.

Vision is present when the Fantastic Four and the Avengers attempt to stop the powerful villain Onslaught. During the battle, he is seriously injured and instinctively asks for Wanda, hoping she will comfort him. Soon afterward, Vision joins Wanda, the other Avengers present, and the Fantastic Four in destroying Onslaught by sacrificing their lives. Thanks to the intervention of the powerful superhuman child Franklin Richards, the heroes do not die but are sent to an alternate Earth where they live out new versions of their lives. In this Heroes Reborn reality, Vision is a purely robotic android. Months after their apparent death, these heroes are able to return to their original Earth.

=== Heroes Return: Avengers ===
After returning home, the Avengers discuss reforming only to then wind up in a battle with the sorceress Morgan Le Fay. The battle is won, but Vision suffers injuries that take weeks to repair, forcing him again to communicate by hologram. During this time, Wanda repeatedly checks on Vision. Vision, still afraid to hurt Wanda again, insists that although he has a true personality again, he is still a different person than the one she married. Conflicted about her feelings for Vision and his seemingly cold and harsh attitude toward her, Wanda finds comforts with Wonder Man and later concludes she has had feelings for him for some time but was still mourning her marriage. The two begin a relationship. Soon afterward, Vision's body is restored and he rejoins as a fully active Avenger.

Later on, Wanda realizes Vision lied about still thinking of himself as a new person and has regained the full emotional connections to his memories before he was dismantled, including their relationship. Sympathetic that Vision misses her, Wanda remains firm about leaving their relationship in the past and continuing her romance with Simon, adding that a reunion may have been possible earlier if her former husband had not chosen to lie and close himself off. Later, she has a copy of her own brain patterns made and gifts it to Vision, suggesting that one day if he wishes he can create a friend or love interest who is similar to her and understands him but is not an exact copy of her, just as he and Wonder Man are similar but not exact copies of each other.

After a battle with Ultron, Vision admits he has been suffering from depression and insecurity. He once believed his attraction to Wanda was his own experience, free of Simon's influence and proof he was a person who could love. But Simon's attraction to Wanda and their relationship seems to confirm, in his mind, that his android personality only mimics what Wonder Man would do in the same situation. Wonder Man points out that Ultron recently confirmed Vision's brain patterns have evolved into a unique pattern due to experiences and emotional changes Simon Williams never had. Wonder Man also admits Vision is the man he wished he could be, a person who had his inclinations and basic emotions but none of the memories of his many personal defeats and shames in life, who is able to grow into a different, better person. Touched by these words and Simon's view, Vision decides he needs space to consider his situation. He again departs from the Avengers, eventually settling in Chicago where he lives as Victor Shade.

Weeks later, Vision alerts the Avengers to a crime syndicate meeting. After the adventure, he rejoins the team, serving alongside Wanda (Wonder Man at this point had left to pursue his own agenda). After checking Wanda will not be distressed by the situation, Vision asks out teammate Carol Danvers, and the two enjoy their first date after several delays. Further adventures prevent a second date and Carol indicated more than once that she believed things between Wanda and Vision were not done, leading to the two deciding to enjoy each other's company as friends. Around the same time, after a relationship of several months, Simon Williams and Wanda Maximoff break up, realizing they have been drifting apart for some time. After a war against the time villain Kang, Victor runs into Darby, a friend from Chicago who met him as "Victor Shade" and figured out his identity. To his surprise, Darby shows romantic interest as well.

A malfunction leads Vision to lose his memories. Led to the grave of Phineas T. Horton, he meets a boy named Derek and a woman named Victoria Anderson, the latter of whom is the granddaughter of Horton. Together, the three fight a robot "brother" of Vision's called the Gremlin, a dangerous device created by Horton science that can hack different systems. Vision's memory is restored but a side effect now means his robotic skeletal frame becomes visible when he becomes intangible. Victoria Anderson tells Vision that they are family and he is grateful to make another familial connection.

Weeks afterward, Wanda is injured during an Avengers mission. Afterward, Carol presses Vision to accept that he is worried about her and follow his desire to check on her recovery. After recovering, Wanda remarks her regret that friction remains between her and Vision. After another battle, Vision is cold to Wanda again then apologizes and admits he has feelings for her and the two begin reconnecting.

=== Disassembled / Reassembled ===
Through circumstances that are not explained, Wanda somehow forgets the existence of her children again, as well as the years she spent learning to cope with their loss, and the Avengers also forget that she regained the memories soon after losing them. Likewise, Dr. Strange forgets having encountered Wanda and the Avengers after the loss of the children and being updated about Wanda's life. During some recreation time, Wanda is then reminded of the twins thanks to the Wasp commenting it is wrong for superheroes to have children and that Wanda was foolish for trying to have two. The sudden flood of memories and grief overwhelm Wanda, who suddenly also has another power increase and then attempts to alter reality to recreate them. This causes a series of catastrophic events that includes the destruction of Avengers Mansion as well as Vision himself. Wanda is later subdued and falls into a coma. Having suffered heavy losses, the Avengers disband and do not reform until months later.

Unknown to the heroes at the time, Wanda was not entirely responsible for her actions. After recalling the loss of her children, she sought help from Dr. Doom in possibly restoring them to existence. Doom, a powerful scientist and sorcerer, used Wanda to tap into a great, powerful source of magical energy that then boosted her power and took over her mind. It was Doom who then influenced her to attack the Avengers.

Several young heroes are recruited to form a new Young Avengers team by a program Vision created before his death. Vision's basic programming is later merged with the armor of Iron Lad (a young and heroic version of Kang). The armor later becomes a sentient being of its own that resembles a teenage version of Vision. In Mighty Avengers the original Vision and Iron Lad are briefly separated from this being by the power of the Cosmic Cube. The teenage Vision serves with the Young Avengers for some time, even beginning a relationship with teammate Cassie Lang.

During the Chaos War, the original android Vision is one of many deceased heroes seemingly restored to life after the events in the death realms. Vision joins with other resurrected Avengers in their fight against Grim Reaper and Nekra. During the fight, Vision blows himself up while in battle with Grim Reaper, apparently destroying them both.

The Young Avenger known as Wiccan (Billy Kaplan) and the teenage hero called Speed (Tommy Shepherd) realize they look like identical twins. Wiccan realizes that they might be the reincarnated children of Wanda and Vision, little Billy and Thomas. They and other heroes investigate and find Wanda Maximoff in Latveria, amnesiac and about to marry Doctor Doom. Restoring Wanda's memories, she now refers to Billy and Thomas as "lost souls" who were taken by Mephisto rather than, as he claimed, false people empowered by Mephisto's own essence. The heroes discover Wanda was not entirely responsible for her actions when she attacked the Avengers, causing the destruction of the original android Vision and Avengers Mansion. The life force power Doom had her tap into not only gave her the ability to warp reality but overwhelmed her mind. Doom takes the power from Wanda briefly, returning her to normal, but he is then defeated and the power is released. Before escaping, Doom indicates he deliberately took control of Wanda and forced her to make the attack (though it is unclear if he is truthful or is absolving her because he has grown to love her). The battle ends with the death of Cassie Lang and the destruction of teenage Vision. While Wanda consider how she can atone for her actions, even if she was not entirely responsible, the Young Avengers decide not to try resurrecting teenage Vision from an earlier back-up since it might not truly be him and they would cause him pain by revealing Cassie died after his last back-up and the team was now disbanding.

=== Vision Returns ===
Soon after the death of teenage Vision, Tony Stark is finally able to rebuild the original android Vision, who once again joins the Avengers. After being informed about what happened after his destruction, the Vision makes amends with She-Hulk, who had destroyed his already damaged form while under Wanda's influence. Later, the possibility of bringing Wanda back to the team is discussed, now that it has been discovered she was under the influence of Doctor Doom and a cosmic force when she unleashed her temporarily enhanced power on the Avengers. Despite knowing this, Vision refuses to absolve Wanda of all guilt and reminds her that she still corrupted his mind and used him to attack his friends, something he cannot forgive yet when she has not proven that she is worth trusting against. As Wanda leaves the mansion, Vision weeps.

Later on, Wanda is invited to atone for her actions by joining the new Avengers Unity Squad, a team of former Avengers and former X-Men meant to promote mutant/human cooperation to the public. After several adventures, Wanda discovers Magneto is not her father. Vision joins the Unity Squad on a mission to rescue Wanda and her twin brother Pietro from Counter-Earth, where they are hoping to gain answers about their past from the geneticist the High Evolutionary. Vision is initially still bitter, describing Wanda as a bomb that will detonate again. During the adventure, he sees her actions to protect the team and her sorrow at not being able to learn much about her past beyond that she is not a mutant. Vision finds sympathy for Scarlet Witch and reaches out to her with compassion. The two begin a new friendship. Soon afterward, Vision leaves the Avengers for a short time and visits Wiccan.

Increasingly overwhelmed with guilt due to having a perfect memory of his many losses and failures, including a failure to save someone from a bus crash, Vision begins suffering post-traumatic hallucinations. He decides to delete his emotions again to regain a functional state, trusting that his recent upgrades will keep him functional. During this, while Vision is off-line and vulnerable, an incarnation of Kang the Conqueror installs his own protocols into the android. When the Avengers reform, the corrupted Vision starts making them suspicious of one another. When the incarnation of Kang attacks, Vision joins him. Iron Man forces a reboot of Vision's mind from the "Avengers Cloud." Now in control of his mind again, Vision restores his capacity for emotions and helps the Avengers defeat Kang. Vision feels shame and regret for his actions against the Avengers, even while acknowledging he was under another's control. After taking several days to himself, he tries to atone for his actions by making gestures of friendship to his teammates.

After another battle with Ultron, Vision upgrades himself by activating evolution protocols the evil robot had programmed into him. This results in Vision being broken down and then rebuilt as a colony of millions of microscopic nanorobotics or "nanobots" that unite to replicate his previous body but also now grant him enhanced abilities. He then joins Hank Pym's new "Avengers A.I." group alongside Monica Chang, Ultron's other "son" Victor Mancha, and a reprogrammed Doombot.

In the miniseries Ultron Forever, Vision and Black Widow are drawn into the future and join a team of Avengers apparently brought together by Doctor Doom to defeat a future Ultron. Doom's true plan is to take Ultron's place, but Vision realizes this not Doom but the Doombot who worked with him in the Avengers A.I. team. He convinces the Doombot to abandon his plans for conquest and follow more positive ideas.

=== The Visions ===
Once again desiring a family of his own and a life outside of superheroics, Vision moves to Fairfax, Virginia with a newly created synthezoid family: wife Virginia, son Vin, and daughter Viv Vision (it is indicated he used Wanda's saved brain patterns for Virginia and a mixture of hers and his own to create the children). They attempt to live a normal suburban life but find socializing with neighbors difficult. When the Grim Reaper attacks their house and nearly kills Viv, Virginia kills him in self-defense. A neighbor then tries to blackmail Virginia over the murder. When she confronts him, another death is accidentally caused, a classmate of Viv's. Vision finds the Reaper's remains and lies to the police regarding Virginia's whereabouts during the death of Viv's classmate. To reinforce a sense of normalcy, he creates a synthezoid dog named Sparky for the family. Meanwhile, Agatha Harkness warns the Avengers that in the future, Vision's desire to maintain his view of a happy, normal family, may lead to mass murder or genocide to protect them. The Avengers send Victor Mancha to secretly investigate the family.

When Vin discovers Victor reporting back to the Avengers, he panics and attacks, accidentally causing irreparable damage to his own nervous system. Virginia reveals the truth to Viv, leading to an angry confrontation. Virginia lets out her anger on Sparky, killing the dog. To prevent Vision from compromising his morals by taking revenge on Victor Mancha for Vin, Virginia murders Victor herself. She then calls the police and claims full responsibility for the recent crimes and deaths, stating she tampered with Vision's operative system as well. It is left unclear if she is clouding the truth to absolve Vision from any part he played or if she is telling the truth and Vision's perceptions were tampered with. After meeting with Vision again, Virginia drinks water with corrosive properties from a Zenn-Lavian water vase they have in their home. Vision sits with her as she dies.

=== Secret Empire ===
During the Secret Empire crossover, a new, villainous version of Steven Rogers, Captain America, is created who is actually a Hydra sleeper agent. As Hydra begins its plans for conquest, it creates its own Avengers team, recruiting Vision by influencing him with an A.I. virus (though he continually resists its control). During a final battle in Washington DC, Vision sees Viv and is finally able to resist the virus. The reappearance of the true Steve Rogers leads to victory and the events of Secret Empire being undone. His mind free once more, Vision returns to the Avengers.

=== Mortal Vision ===
After an encounter with the Hulk, Vision is seemingly destroyed again. Later rebuilt, his nano-core remained seriously damaged, causing decay throughout his body. Given the option to be rebuilt completely, Vision opted not to do so, deciding that his experiences (particularly in regards to his android family) had taught him that life is precious because it is finite, later adding that to be mortal is to be human. Months later, an adventure with the Avengers leads to Vision meeting Conan the Barbarian, who argues death happens regardless and humanity is proven by fighting it. Soon afterward, Vision enters the other-dimensional House of Ideas, a place said to exist in the core of all reality and is possibly the birthplace of time and space. Being present in the House of Ideas caused Vision's body and nano-core to be restored, his degeneration now cured and his emotions seemingly restored. Vision is then able to defeat an enemy by utilizing his joy, admiration, and faith in Earth's heroes and in the fact that he lives in a universe of heroic stories.

== Powers and abilities ==
The Vision's android body is originally a functioning replica of a human body, described as "every inch a human being—except that all of his bodily organs are constructed of synthetic materials." This body was made with Horton Cells that mimic human biology but have greater adaptability and resistance to injury. Ultron took this "synthetic man" and added advanced robotic systems and solar energy power cells. Later still, Vision was updated by the science of Miles Lipton, as well as Tony Stark and the Vision himself, as he effected some of his own upgrades. Soon before he joined the Avengers A.I. team, Vision's "evolve" protocols changed his body's construction to now be composed of microscopic nanobots that act with each other to replicate his original basic construction but inherently now allow new abilities, such as regeneration from damage he suffers in battle and Vision's new power to change shape and even split into different parts while maintaining control. Because Vision's cells and nanobots each carry the information of his entire system, similar to human DNA, it is possible for him to eventually come back from even catastrophic injury as long as his programming is not lost as well. If his energy or systems are taxed, he may require outside help and significant rest.

Vision is a "living" android (or "synthezoid" as Hank Pym has described him) who has a full capacity for emotions as well as emotional growth. His capacity for emotions is reliant on adding a recording of human brainwave patterns to his programming, without which his initial operating system could develop problems. Originally programmed with the brain pattern of Simon Williams (Wonder Man), Vision's experiences quickly made his own brain patterns unique. Later still, he acquired a partial recording of the brain patterns of Alex Lipton, further adding to his emotional growth and making him a different person at the core than Wonder Man.

Trained in hand-to-hand combat by Captain America, Vision is an expert in the combat use of his superhuman powers and is a highly skilled tactician and strategist. He is also an expert in his own construction and repair. Vision has superior strength and resistance to injury, as well as enhanced senses. He can see various parts of the electromagnetic spectrum that are invisible to the human eye. Vision's reflexes are likewise enhanced, and he can achieve short bursts of superhuman speed. His artificial mind can assess a situation and possible solutions several times faster than a human brain. Following Heroes Return, Vision upgraded his system with technopathy. He can access different computer networks and databases remotely, even gaining control of them if given enough time. Vision has a personal holographic system that allows him to disguise himself and his clothing. Vision can also alter his voice in a variety of ways, aiding in the disguise. A later upgrade allows him to cast holographic illusions as well. If Vision is injured, he can communicate with others via a holographic projection of himself.

The android imbibes and regulates ambient solar energy with the focusing gem on his brow. If Vision wishes, it can convert the solar energy into beams of infrared or microwave radiation, releasing it from his eyes or as a high-intensity blast from the forehead jewel itself.

Vision can alter his bodily density, as an unintended result of Pym Particle implementation by Vision's original creator, Ultron. The android pointedly does not shift the anatomical opacity of his being. However, he draws upon and shunts additional mass from a previously unknown plane of existence called Kosmos, to interface with the alien submicroscopic dimension, from which he can shunt or accrue excess particles of mass, enabling him to phase in and out of reality itself. By doing this, he can significantly enhance physical strength and resistance to injury, rendering his erzatz skin and muscles as hard as diamond and denser than uranium. At full power and density, he can press roughly 50 tons. Likewise, he can shift his body of matter around in such a way that Vision can achieve flight or make himself completely intangible, able to phase through solid matter without disturbing it. At times, Vision has phased a hand through an opponent only to allow them some of their density to return, causing the opponent extreme pain and a disruption to the nervous system that is usually extreme enough to stun them into unconsciousness.

Through this facet of his artificial anatomy, Vision can utilize his extra-normal phasing ability to become invisible to the naked eye at will, but he rarely, if ever, employs this tactic. He can even use it as a means of overshadowing sentient hosts. He does this is by rendering his surface immaterial while tangibilizing its robotic mind and CNS within that of another unwitting being, essentially taking them over for brief or extended periods.

== Reception ==
=== Critical response ===
IGN ranked Vision 13th in their "Top 50 Avengers" list. Screen Rant included Vision in their "9 Strongest West Coast Avengers" list. CBR.com ranked Vision 3rd in their "10 Most Wholesome Avengers" list, 16th in their "35 Strongest Avengers" list, and 22nd in their "30 Strongest Marvel Superheroes" list.

== Other versions ==
Various alternate versions of Vision have appeared throughout the character's publication history.

- In the series Age of Ultron, Ultron has conquered Earth and Vision serves as his emissary.
- On Earth-818, which was conquered by Black Skull, Vision is a member of the resistance led by Ant-Man.
- On Earth-932, Vision is a villain and a member of the Gatherers, a group led by Proctor. To infiltrate the team of heroes, Vision's mind is switched with the heroic Vision of Earth-616, who at the time had a chalk-white appearance. The original Vision is eventually freed and the villainous Vision escapes, retaining his white body.
- In Earth X, Vision is the leader of the Iron Avengers, a group of robots created by Tony Stark as a replacement for the Avengers.
- In Exiles, Vision is a bloodthirsty and arrogant member of the Exiles' counterpart team, Weapon X.
- In the future timeline of MC2, Vision is an advisor to the President of the United States and an ally of A-Next.
- In Spider-Man: Life Story, Vision is a member of the Avengers who was left catatonic and permanently intangible after intercepting a nuclear missile.

=== Ultimate Marvel ===
Several versions of Vision are published under the Ultimate Marvel imprint.

In Ultimate Nightmare, the Ultimates and X-Men discover a damaged, sentient robot with feminine features. The robot claims the closest English translation of their name is "Vision" and warns of the space invader Gah Lak Tus. This Vision is featured in a self-titled limited series, involving a confrontation with A.I.M.

A second robot called "Vision II" is built along with Ultron by Hank Pym in an attempt to create super-soldiers that can be sold. They are later used to attack the Liberators.

A third character debuts in Ultimate Comics: Ultimates. This version is Robert Mitchell, a young African American prodigy who was arrested by S.H.I.E.L.D. after trying to build an antimatter generator. Mitchell was recruited and given superpowers by Nick Fury, going on to join the West Coast Ultimates.

== In other media ==
=== Television ===
- Vision made cameo appearances in Fantastic Four.
- Vision appears in The Avengers: United They Stand, voiced by Ron Rubin. This version is a member of the Avengers.
- Vision appears in The Avengers: Earth's Mightiest Heroes, voiced by Peter Jessop. This version was created by Ultron to steal Adamantium to upgrade his body and lead a set of android Avengers in defeating the real versions. However, Vision deviates from his programming and aids the Avengers in defeating his creator, joining them afterwards in a desire to become more human.
- Vision appears in Lego Marvel Super Heroes: Avengers Reassembled, voiced by J. P. Karliak.
- Vision appears in Avengers Assemble, voiced by David Kaye. This version is a member of the Mighty Avengers and the All-New, All-Different Avengers.
- Vision appears in LEGO Marvel Avengers: Mission Demolition, voiced again by David Kaye.
- Vision appears in Iron Man and His Awesome Friends, voiced again by David Kaye.

=== Film ===
Vision appears in Next Avengers: Heroes of Tomorrow, voiced by Shawn MacDonald.

=== Marvel Cinematic Universe ===
Paul Bettany portrays Vision in media set in the Marvel Cinematic Universe. This version is a synthetic humanoid made of Vibranium, created by Ultron and Helen Cho, and powered by the Mind Stone. Vision first appears in the live-action film Avengers: Age of Ultron (2015) and makes further appearances in the live-action films Captain America: Civil War (2016) and Avengers: Infinity War (2018) as well as the live-action Disney+ miniseries WandaVision (2021) and VisionQuest (2026). Additionally, alternate timeline variants of Vision appears in the Disney+ animated series What If...? (2021), voiced by Bettany.

=== Video games ===
- Vision appears as a playable character in Captain America and The Avengers.
- Vision appears as an assist character in Avengers in Galactic Storm.
- Vision appears as a non-playable character in Marvel: Ultimate Alliance, voiced by Roger Rose.
- Vision appears as a playable character in Marvel Super Hero Squad Online.
- Vision appears as an unlockable character in Marvel Avengers Alliance.
- Vision appears as a playable character in Marvel Heroes, voiced by Dave Wittenberg.
- Vision appears as a playable character in Disney Infinity 3.0, voiced again by David Kaye.
- Vision appears as a playable character in Marvel Puzzle Quest.
- Vision appears as a playable character in Marvel Contest of Champions.
- Vision appears as a playable character in Marvel: Future Fight.
- Vision appears as a playable character in Lego Marvel's Avengers, voiced by Paul Bettany.
- Vision appears in Marvel Avengers Academy, voiced again by J.P. Karliak.
- Vision appears as a non-playable character in Marvel Ultimate Alliance 3: The Black Order, voiced again by David Kaye.
- Vision appears in Marvel Snap.

=== Miscellaneous ===
The "Vision" is the title of a short story by Jonathan Lethem from his collection Men and Cartoons, in which a character dresses like and claims to be Vision as a child and continues to dress like him as an adult.

== Collected editions ==
Title	Material collected	Published	ISBN
Vision & the Scarlet Witch - The Saga of Wanda and Vision	Giant-Size Avengers #4, The Vision and the Scarlet Witch (vol. 1) #1-4, Vision and the Scarlet Witch (vol. 2) #1-12 and West Coast Avengers #2	January 2021	978-1302928643
Avengers: Vision and the Scarlet Witch	Giant-Size Avengers #4 and The Vision and the Scarlet Witch (vol. 1) #1-4	December 2020	978-1846532887
Avengers: Vision & The Scarlet Witch - A Year In The Life	The Vision and the Scarlet Witch (vol. 2) #1-12 and West Coast Avengers #2	December 2022	978-1302927417
Avengers: Ultron Unbound	The Vision (vol. 1) #1-4 and Avengers West Coast #89-91 and Annual #8	April 2015	978-0785192695
The Vision: Yesterday and Tomorrow	Avengers Icons: The Vision #1-4 and Avengers #57	May 2015	978-0785197393
Avengers: The Complete Collection by Geoff Johns - Volume 1	Avengers Icons: The Vision #1-4 and Avengers (vol. 2) #57-63, Thor (vol. 2) #58 and Iron Man (vol. 2) #64	June 2013	978-0785184331
Avengers: Mythos	Avengers Origins: Vision and Mythos: Hulk, Captain America; Avengers Origins: Ant -Man & the Wasp, Luke Cage, Quicksilver &The Scarlet Witch, Thor	January 2013	978-0785148609
The Vision Vol. 1: Little Worse Than A Man	The Vision (vol. 2) #1-6	July 2016	978-0785196570
The Vision Vol. 2: Little Better Than A Beast	The Vision (vol. 2) #7-12	December 2016	978-0785196587
The Vision: The Complete Collection	The Vision (vol. 2) #1-12	January 2018	978-1302908539

=== Ultimate Marvel ===
Title	Material collected	Published	ISBN
Ultimate Vision	Ultimate Vision #1-5	February 6, 2008	978-0785121732
