= Sam Humphries =

American comic book writer

- Born: Samuel Ryan Humphries; March 16, 1977 (age 49) Maryland, U.S.
- Area: Writer
- Notable works: Our Love is Real; The Ultimates; Legendary Star-Lord; Jonesy; Green Lanterns; Harley Quinn

Sam Humphries (born March 16, 1977) is an American comic book writer located in London. Between 2018 and 2020, he co-hosted DC Daily on the DC Universe streaming platform.

== Early life ==
Humphries was born in Annapolis, Maryland and grew up in Minneapolis, Minnesota.

== Career ==
Humphries began his career in the early 2000s as a Consulting Editor for Gutsoon! Entertainment and, as part of his duties to "monitor the chatter" around the American comic book industry, joined the Warren Ellis Forum where he got acquainted with several professional and aspiring comic book creators. After the dissolution of Gutsoon!, Humphries went on to work at MySpace, where he developed several projects including the network's comics section and its most popular feature, MySpace Dark Horse Presents, the digital revival of Dark Horse's signature anthology series that had been canceled several years prior. Between 2010 and 2011, Humpries was a co-host on Meltcast, the official podcast of the comic book store Meltdown Comics.

Humphries made his debut as a writer in 2010, contributing short stories to Fraggle Rock and a CBGB-themed anthology published by Boom! Studios. In 2011, he self-published Our Love is Real, a sci-fi sex satire that brought him to the attention of comic book publishers. The following year, he was hired by Marvel to write an adaptation of John Carter: The Gods of Mars and take over the scripting duties of Ultimate Comics: The Ultimates after the departure of Jonathan Hickman. During his run on The Ultimates, Humphires wrote the storyline involving Captain America becoming the President of the United States, which received nation-wide coverage in the news. In 2013, he launched the second volume of Uncanny X-Force and wrote an Age of Ultron spin-off series, Avengers A.I.. After signing an exclusive contract with Marvel, Humphries worked on Legendary Star-Lord, one of the Guardians of the Galaxy spin-off series launched in anticipation of the 2014 film, and developed the multi-title crossover storyline "The Black Vortex". In 2016, Humphries joined DC Comics, launching Green Lanterns as part of the company's DC Rebirth initiative. In 2018, he took over Harley Quinn, staying on the title for the next two years. That same year, it was announced Humphries would resurrect the Silver Age title Dial H for Hero for Wonder Comics, DC's "pop-up" imprint curated by Brian Michael Bendis.

Humphries' creator-owned comics include his second self-published series Sacrifice with Dalton Rose, Jonesy with Caitlin Rose Boyle, published by Boom! Studios, and Blackbird with Jen Bartel, published by Image.

In addition to his work in comics, Humphries was a contributing writer for several comics-oriented websites such as Artbomb, Comic Book Resources and ComicsAlliance. In 2014, he co-wrote the mobile fighting game Marvel Contest of Champions, developed by Kabam.

== Personal life ==
Humphries has epilepsy.

== Bibliography ==
=== Early work ===
- Free Comic Book Day 2010: Mouse Guard Spring 1153/Fraggle Rock: "The Birthday Present" (with Jeremy Love, co-feature in one-shot, Archaia Studios, 2010)
  - Collected in Fraggle Rock Volume 1 (hc, 136 pages, 2010, ISBN 1-932386-42-4)
  - Collected in Fraggle Rock Omnibus (tpb, 240 pages, Boom! Studios, 2018, ISBN 1-68415-118-X)
- Our Love is Real (with Steven Sanders, one-shot — self-published in July 2011, reprinted by Image in November 2011)
- Sacrifice #1–6 (with Dalton Rose, self-published, 2011–2013) collected as Sacrifice (hc, 168 pages, Dark Horse, 2013, ISBN 1-59582-985-7)
- Virginia (with Pete Toms, 8-page webcomic, Study Group Comics, 2012)
- Ahoy, Booty!: "Beach Bums" (with Sloane Leong, short segment in the zine self-published by Lainey Diamond and Emily Partridge, 2012)

=== Boom! Studios ===
- CBGB OMFUG #1: "The Helsinki Syndrome" (with Rob G., anthology, 2010) collected in CBGB OMFUG (tpb, 112 pages, 2010, ISBN 1-60886-024-8)
- Fanboys vs. Zombies (with Jerry Gaylord and Bryan Turner (#7–8, 10); issues #10–12 are scripted by Shane Houghton from Humphries' plots, 2012–2013) collected as:
  - Wrecking Crew 4 Lyfe (collects #1–4, tpb, 128 pages, 2013, ISBN 1-60886-289-5)
  - Appetite for Destruction (collects #5–8, tpb, 112 pages, 2013, ISBN 1-60886-307-7)
  - Escape From San Diego (collects #9–12, tpb, 112 pages, 2013, ISBN 1-60886-335-2)
- Higher Earth (with Francesco Biagini, Manuel Bracchi (#2–3) and Joe Eisma (#5), 2012–2013) collected as:
  - Volume 1 (collects #1–5, tpb, 128 pages, 2013, ISBN 1-60886-290-9)
  - Volume 2 (collects #6–9, tpb, 112 pages, 2013, ISBN 1-60886-304-2)
- Jonesy (with Caitlin Rose Boyle, Boom! Box, 2016–2017) collected as:
  - Volume 1 (collects #1–4, tpb, 112 pages, 2016, ISBN 1-60886-883-4)
  - Volume 2 (collects #5–8, tpb, 112 pages, 2017, ISBN 1-60886-999-7)
  - Volume 3 (collects #9–12, tpb, 112 pages, 2017, ISBN 1-68415-016-7)
- Firefly:
  - Firefly: The Fall Guys #1–6 (with Jordi Pérez, 2023–2024) collected as Firefly: The Fall Guys (hc, 160 pages, 2024, ISBN 1-6088-6248-8)
  - Firefly: Malcolm Reynolds — Year One (with Giovanni Fabiano, one-shot, 2024)
- Power Rangers: Infinity (with Ted Brandt and Ro Stein, one-shot, 2024)
- Hello Darkness #18–20: "Cassie" (with Eleonora Carlini, anthology, 2026)
  - All chapters of the story were reprinted in a separate one-shot under the title Cassie (2026)
  - All of the chapters were also collected in Hello Darkness Volume 5 (tpb, 176 pages, 2026, ISBN 979-8892158589)

=== Marvel Comics ===
- John Carter: The Gods of Mars #1–5 (with Ramón K. Pérez, 2012) collected as John Carter: The Gods of Mars (tpb, 112 pages, 2012, ISBN 0-7851-6513-4)
- Ultimate Comics: The Ultimates (with Luke Ross, Butch Guice (#11–12), Billy Tan (#13–15), Timothy Green II (#14), Dale Eaglesham (#18.1), Scot Eaton (#19–21) and Joe Bennett (#22–24), 2012–2013) collected as:
  - Ultimate Comics: The Ultimates by Jonathan Hickman Volume 2 (includes #10–12, hc, 144 pages, 2012, ISBN 0-7851-5719-0; tpb, 2013, ISBN 0-7851-5720-4)
    - Issues #10–12 are scripted by Humphries from Jonathan Hickman's plots.
  - Ultimate Comics: Divided We Fall, United We Stand (includes #13–18, hc, 408 pages, 2013, ISBN 0-7851-6781-1; tpb, 2013, ISBN 0-7851-8416-3)
  - Ultimate Comics: The Ultimates by Sam Humphries Volume 1 (collects #18.1 and 19–24, tpb, 160 pages, 2013, ISBN 0-7851-6174-0)
- Uncanny X-Force vol. 2 (with Ron Garney (#1–4), Adrian Alphona, Dexter Soy (#5–6, 16–17), Dalibor Talajić (#7–9, 15), Ramón K. Pérez (#10–11), Angel Unzueta (#13), Philippe Briones (#13–15) and Harvey Tolibao (#16–17), 2013–2014) collected as:
  - Let It Bleed (collects #1–6, tpb, 136 pages, 2013, ISBN 0-7851-6739-0)
  - Torn and Frayed (collects #7–12, tpb, 136 pages, 2013, ISBN 0-7851-6740-4)
  - The Great Corruption (collects #13–17, tpb, 160 pages, 2014, ISBN 0-7851-8985-8)
- Avengers A.I. (with André Lima Araújo and Valerio Schiti (#5–6), 2013–2014) collected as:
  - Human After All (collects #1–6, tpb, 136 pages, 2013, ISBN 0-7851-8491-0)
  - 12,000 A.D. (collects #7–12, tpb, 136 pages, 2014, ISBN 0-7851-8492-9)
- Guardians of the Galaxy:
  - Legendary Star-Lord (with Paco Medina, Freddie Williams II (#4, 7–8) and Andrea Sorrentino (#12), 2014–2015) collected as:
    - Face It, I Rule (collects #1–5, tpb, 112 pages, 2015, ISBN 0-7851-9159-3)
    - Rise of the Black Vortex (collects #6–12, tpb, 160 pages, 2015, ISBN 0-7851-9160-7)
  - Guardians of the Galaxy and X-Men: The Black Vortex (hc, 312 pages, 2015, ISBN 0-7851-9770-2; tpb, 2016, ISBN 0-7851-9909-8) includes:
    - Guardians of the Galaxy and X-Men: The Black Vortex Alpha (with Ed McGuiness and Kris Anka, one-shot, 2015)
    - Guardians Team-Up #3: "The Black Vortex, Chapter Six" (with Mike Mayhew, 2015)
    - Guardians of the Galaxy and X-Men: The Black Vortex Omega (with Ed McGuiness and Javier Garrón, one-shot, 2015)
  - Secret Wars: Star-Lord and Kitty Pryde #1–3 (with Alti Firmansyah, 2015)
    - Collected as Secret Wars — Battleworld: Star-Lord and Kitty Pryde (tpb, 128 pages, 2015, ISBN 0-7851-9843-1)
    - Collected in Secret Wars: Battleworld Omnibus Volume 4 (hc, 1,280 pages, 2027, ISBN 1-3029-7179-4)
  - Star-Lord vol. 2 (with Javier Garrón and Will Robson (#8), 2016) collected as:
    - First Fly (collects #1–5, tpb, 112 pages, 2016, ISBN 0-7851-9624-2)
    - Out of Orbit (collects #6–8, tpb, 128 pages, 2016, ISBN 0-7851-9625-0)
- The Avengers vol. 5 #34.2: "Big City" (with Bengal, 2015) collected in Avengers World: The Complete Collection (tpb, 528 pages, 2019, ISBN 1-302-91617-3)
- Secret Wars: Planet Hulk #1–5 (with Marc Laming, 2015)
  - Collected as Secret Wars — Warzones: Planet Hulk (tpb, 120 pages, 2016, ISBN 0-7851-9881-4)
  - Collected in Secret Wars: Battleworld Omnibus Volume 3 (hc, 1,200 pages, 2026, ISBN 1-3029-6841-6)
- Weirdworld #1–6 (with Mike del Mundo, 2016) collected as Weirdworld: Where Lost Things Go (tpb, 136 pages, 2016, ISBN 1-302-90043-9)
- The New Avengers vol. 5 (with Ton Lima and Tiago Palma (#4–5), 2025–2026) collected as:
  - Killuminati (collects #1–5, tpb, 120 pages, 2026, ISBN 1-30296-401-1)
  - The Other Woman (collects #6–10, tpb, 112 pages, 2026, ISBN 1-3029-6402-X)
- Alias: Red Band #1–5 (with Geraldo Borges, 2026) collected as Alias: Red Band (tpb, 120 pages, 2026, ISBN 1-3029-6954-4)

=== DC Comics ===
- Green Lanterns:
  - Green Lanterns (with Robson Rocha, Eduardo Pansica, Will Conrad + Jack Herbert (#6), Ronan Cliquet, Ed Benes (#8), Miguel Mendonça (#15), Neil Edwards (#16), Carlo Barberi (#24, 30) and Scott Godlewski (#32), 2016–2017) collected as:
    - Rage Planet (collects #1–6, tpb, 168 pages, 2017, ISBN 1-4012-6775-0)
      - Includes the Green Lanterns: Rebirth one-shot (co-written by Humphries and Geoff Johns, art by Ethan Van Sciver and Ed Benes, 2016)
    - The Phantom Lantern (collects #7–14, tpb, 192 pages, 2017, ISBN 1-4012-6849-8)
    - Polarity (collects #15–21, tpb, 168 pages, 2017, ISBN 1-4012-7371-8)
    - The First Ring (collects #22–26, tpb, 128 pages, 2017, ISBN 1-4012-7505-2)
    - Out of Time (collects #27–32, tpb, 144 pages, 2018, ISBN 1-4012-7879-5)
  - Green Lantern vol. 7 #9: "The Trial of Jessica Cruz" (with Yasmín Flores Montañez, co-feature, 2024) collected in Green Lantern: Love and War (tpb, 200 pages, 2025, ISBN 1-7995-0050-0)
- Manhunter Special: "The Demon and the Infernal Prisons" (with Steve Rude, co-feature, 2017) collected in Jack Kirby 100th Celebration Collection (tpb, 192 pages, 2018, ISBN 1-4012-7479-X)
- Legion of Super-Heroes/Bugs Bunny Special (with Tom Grummett, 2017) collected in DC Meets Looney Tunes (tpb, 248 pages, 2018, ISBN 1-4012-7757-8)
- Batman: The Dawnbreaker (with Ethan Van Sciver, one-shot, 2017)
  - Collected in Dark Nights: Metal — Dark Knights Rising (hc, 216 pages, 2018, ISBN 1-4012-7737-3; tpb, 2019, ISBN 1-4012-8907-X)
  - Collected in Dark Nights: Metal (Omnibus hc, 760 pages, 2023, ISBN 1-77-951703-3; Compendium tpb, 2025, ISBN 1-7995-0084-5)
- Nightwing vol. 4 #35–41 (with Bernard Chang, Jamal Campbell (#37, 39, 41), Klaus Janson (#37) and Phil Jimenez (#39), 2018)
  - Collected as Nightwing: The Untouchable (tpb, 216 pages, 2018, ISBN 1-4012-8757-3)
  - Collected in Nightwing: Rebirth Omnibus (hc, 1,496 pages, 2025, ISBN 1-7995-0116-7)
- Harley Quinn:
  - Harley Quinn vol. 3 (with John Timms, Alisson Borges (#48–49), Sami Basri, Lucas Werneck (#53–54), Otto Schmidt (#61–63) and Abel (#72), 2018–2020) collected as:
    - Harley vs. Apokolips (includes #45–49, tpb, 168 pages, 2018, ISBN 1-4012-8507-4)
    - Harley Destroys the Universe (collects #50–54, tpb, 160 pages, 2019, ISBN 1-4012-8809-X)
    - The Trials of Harley Quinn (collects #55 and 57–63, tpb, 208 pages, 2019, ISBN 1-4012-9191-0)
    - The Final Trial (includes #64–68, tpb, 168 pages, 2020, ISBN 1-4012-9455-3)
    - Hollywood or Die (collects #70–75, tpb, 176 pages, 2021, ISBN 1-77950-309-1)
  - Harley Quinn: Black + White + Red #15: "Happy Thanksquinning" (with Stephen Byrne, digital anthology, 2020) collected in Harley Quinn: Black + White + Red (tpb, 232 pages, 2021, ISBN 1-77950-995-2)
  - Harley Quinn: 30th Anniversary 100-Page Super Spectacular: "A Legend is Born" (with Erica Henderson, anthology one-shot, 2021)
- Dial H for Hero (with Joe Quinones, Arist Deyn (#3) and Paulina Ganucheau (#8), Wonder Comics, 2019–2020) collected as:
  - Enter the Heroverse (collects #1–6, tpb, 160 pages, 2019, ISBN 1-4012-9443-X)
  - New Heroes of Metropolis (collects #7–12, tpb, 160 pages, 2020, ISBN 1-77950-176-5)
- Dark Nights: Death Metal — Infinite Hour Exxxtreme: "Chapter Three" (with Denys Cowan, co-feature in one-shot, 2021)
  - Collected in Dark Nights: Death Metal — The Multiverse Who Laughs (tpb, 208 pages, 2021, ISBN 1-77950-793-3)
  - Collected in Dark Nights: Death Metal Omnibus (hc, 968 pages, 2024, ISBN 1-7795-2307-6)

=== Other publishers ===
- Think of a City page 21 (with Mingjue Helen Chen, Internet art project, 2014)
- Image:
  - Citizen Jack #1–6 (with Tommy Patterson, 2015–2016) collected as Citizen Jack (tpb, 168 pages, 2016, ISBN 1-63215-705-5)
  - Blackbird #1–6 (with Jen Bartel, 2018–2019) collected as Blackbird: The Great Beast (tpb, 168 pages, 2019, ISBN 978-1-5343-1259-3)
  - Super Creepshow #4: "The New Life" (with Sean Izaakse, anthology, Skybound, 2026) collected in Super Creepshow (tpb, 160 pages, 2026, ISBN 1-5343-3321-5)
- Attack on Titan Anthology: "Playtime on Titan" (with Damion Scott, anthology graphic novel, 256 pages, Kodansha, 2016, ISBN 1-63236-258-9)
- Goliath Girls #1–5 (with Alti Firmansyah, self-published digitally via Comixology under the Shadow Valley label, 2018–2019)
  - The series was released simultaneously in English and Japanese (as ゴリアテ・ガールズ — translated by Youhei-Penguin)
- Gatchaman (with Pasquale Qualano (#11, 16), Chris Batista and Giona Zefiro (#21), Mad Cave Studios, 2025–ongoing) collected as:
  - Volume 3 (collects #11–15, tpb, 128 pages, 2026, ISBN 1-5458-2339-1; hc, 2026, ISBN 1-5458-2931-4)
  - Volume 4 (collects #16–20, tpb, 160 pages, 2020, ISBN 1-5458-2937-3; hc, 2027, ISBN 1-5458-4116-0)
- Skate Ali #1–5 (co-written by Humphries and Kelly Sue DeConnick, art by Natacha Bustos, Dark Horse, 2026) collected as Skate Ali (tpb, 136 pages, 2027, ISBN 1-5067-5239-X)

Preceded by Jonathan Hickman	Ultimate Comics: The Ultimates writer 2012–2013	Succeeded by Joshua Hale Fialkov
Preceded by Rick Remender	Uncanny X-Force writer 2013–2014	Succeeded by Simon Spurrier (X-Force vol. 4)
Preceded by Timothy Zahn	Star-Lord writer 2014–2016	Succeeded by Chip Zdarsky
Preceded by n/a	Green Lanterns writer 2016–2017	Succeeded by Tim Seeley
Preceded by Tim Seeley	Nightwing writer 2018	Succeeded by Benjamin Percy
Preceded by Frank Tieri	Harley Quinn writer 2018–2020	Succeeded by Stephanie Phillips
