= Age of Ultron =

Marvel Comics comic book storyline

- Age of Ultron #1 (May 2013); Cover art by Bryan Hitch and Paul Neary

Publication information
- Publisher: Marvel Comics
- Schedule: Thrice monthly (first 6 issues), twice monthly (last 4 issues)
- Format: Limited series
- Genre: Superhero
- Publication date: March – June 2013
- No. of issues: 10
- Main character(s): Avengers; Hank Pym; Wolverine; Invisible Woman; Ultron; Avengers Unity Squad; Fearless Defenders

Creative team
- Created by: Brian Michael Bendis; Bryan Hitch
- Written by: Brian Michael Bendis
- Artist(s): Bryan Hitch (#1-5, 10); Brandon Peterson (#6-10); Carlos Pacheco (#6-7, 9-10); Butch Guice (#10); Alex Maleev (#10); David Marquez (#10); Joe Quesada (#10)
- Inker(s): Paul Neary (#1-5, 10); Roger Bonet (#9-10); Roger Martinez (#6-7, 9); Tom Palmer (#10)
- Letterer: Cory Petit
- Colorist(s): Paul Mounts; Jose Villarrubia (#6-7, 9); Richard Isanove (#10)
- Editor(s): Tom Brevoort; Lauren Sankovitch

"Age of Ultron" (abbreviated AU) is a 2013 comic book crossover storyline published by Marvel Comics that involves the conquest of Earth by the villainous robot Ultron. The storyline consists of an eponymous, 10-issue core miniseries, and a number of tie-in books.

The storyline was published between March and June 2013 and was written by Brian Michael Bendis. Artist Bryan Hitch provided the art for issues one through five, and Brandon Peterson for issues six through nine. Other artists who contributed to the series include Carlos Pacheco and Joe Quesada, the latter of whom drew part of the final issue. Marvel has stated that all art for the series was completed before it was solicited, ensuring deadlines were met and that there were no more than thirteen tie-ins to the four-month event.

This story takes place in two different universes: the alternate Earth where Ultron annihilated humanity is referred to as Earth-61112, and the alternate reality where Morgan le Fay took over half the world is referred to as Earth-26111. A sequel series, Cataclysm, was released later in 2013.

The story arc's title served as an inspiration for the Marvel Cinematic Universe (MCU) film Avengers: Age of Ultron (2015), although the film does not directly adapt the events of the storyline. A loose adaptation of the Age of Ultron storyline later appeared in the MCU animated series What If...? (2021).

== Publication history ==
In 2011, Avengers Vol. 4 No. 12.1 featured a storyline where the Intelligencia find a crash-landed Spaceknight and try to power it back up. During a fight with the Avengers while they try to rescue Spider-Woman, the Spaceknight is powered up, revealing that it was Ultron in disguise. Ultron escapes, setting up the events of Age of Ultron.

In mid-November, 2012, Marvel Comics released a cryptic teaser spelling "Age of Ultron" in binary code. Three days later, the event was officially announced. The first issue, written by Brian Michael Bendis, was released in March 2013, and the series ran for ten issues until June of the same year.

Neil Gaiman's Angela character was introduced into the Marvel Universe in the last issue of the Age of Ultron miniseries, although the issue was shipped in a polybag to prevent other details of the story's ending from being publicized too early. An Age of Ultron #10 A.I. one-shot by writer Mark Waid and artist André Lima Araújo delved into the repercussions of the storyline for Hank Pym. Following the conclusion of Age of Ultron, a new ongoing series titled Avengers A.I. by writer Sam Humphries and André Lima Araújo launched in July.

== Plot ==
=== Main story ===
Ultron has returned and taken over the world, with Ultron Sentinels guarding the streets and looking for fugitives. After rescuing Spider-Man, Hawkeye takes him to an underground area beneath Central Park, where the other surviving heroes have taken refuge. Captain America has the idea to offer a hero to Ultron to be captured to infiltrate his base; Luke Cage and She-Hulk volunteer and Cage delivers She-Hulk to Ultron's forces. Cage is shocked when he discovers that they are going to negotiate with Vision instead of Ultron. Vision reveals that Ultron is acting from the future using him as a conduit. She-Hulk is killed freeing Cage and the other superheroes flee Manhattan. Cage dies from radiation poisoning, but is able to tell the heroes what he learned about Ultron.

Meanwhile in San Francisco, Black Widow meets with Moon Knight in one of Nick Fury's old bases to search for fail-safe plans Fury had for different apocalyptic scenarios. The heroes regroup in the Savage Land, and Black Widow arrives with Moon Knight and Red Hulk, and they reveal Fury had a fail-safe plan to defeat Ultron should he conquer the world. The heroes meet with Fury, who plans to use Doctor Doom's Time Platform to go into the future and defeat Ultron before he attacks the present. Iron Man, Captain America, Nick Fury, Red Hulk, Storm, Quake and Quicksilver go into the future, but Wolverine goes into the past to kill Hank Pym before he can create Ultron, and is followed by the Invisible Woman. The Invisible Woman attempts to convince Wolverine to reconsider his plan, but he reminds her of the crimes Ultron will commit and kills Pym.

The two return to the present to find the Savage Land covered in crashed ships, as in this timeline the war between the Kree and the Skrulls came to Earth. They go to New York and find it patrolled by three Helicarriers, and are attacked by the Defenders, who believe the two are Skrulls. A cyborg Iron Man scans their minds and sees their timeline, and explains that the Avengers broke up after Pym's death and that Morgan le Fay has conquered half the world. The two attempt to break out of the Defenders' Helicarrier when Morgan le Fey attacks with a swarm of Doombots. During the battle, le Fey crashes the other two Helicarriers into New York. Most of the heroes are killed, and a dying Iron Man tells Wolverine he cannot go back in time to try and correct this again, as time will break if ripped too much.

In the past, the previous Wolverine is about to kill Pym when the new Wolverine stops him, and warns him that killing Pym will result in a disaster worse than Ultron. Pym says he will simply not build Ultron, but Wolverine realizes he must preserve the original timeline, and Pym decides to instead install a fail-safe to destroy Ultron. The Invisible Woman and the two Wolverines go to the Savage Land, and the present Wolverine has his past self kill him, since he does not want to live with memories of the ruined future. The Avengers attack the headquarters of the Intelligencia to rescue Spider-Woman, the event that originally led to Ultron's reactivation. Once Ultron serves his purpose in the attack, Pym gives Iron Man the algorithm and it is uploaded into Ultron, destroying him.

Wolverine and the Invisible Woman return to the present and find New York back to normal, but a massive shockwave across time and space seemingly shatters reality before putting it back together. At Avengers Tower, Giant-Man, Iron Man and Beast theorize that Wolverine's time travel journeys caused stress to the space-time continuum and has created tears across the multiverse. In his lab, Pym has a realization on what went wrong and how he must fix it.

Pym reflects on his life and contemplates suicide when he considers that his scientific pursuits resulted in the world's destruction by Ultron, but realizes that the future where Ultron was not created was worse, and takes this as proof he can be a force for positive change in the world. Thus he rededicates himself to superheroics as Ant-Man, a decision that satisfies both sides of his curiosity.

=== Tie-in books ===
While traveling through time and space, the Fantastic Four are contacted by the Black Panther, who informs them that Ultron has taken over the Earth with an army of Ultron Sentinels. After returning to Earth, the team discovers that Manhattan is almost in ruins. While looking for survivors, they are attacked by the Ultron Sentinels. Mister Fantastic, the Human Torch, and the Thing seemingly die in the attack while the Invisible Woman escapes with She-Hulk where they join the resistance.

While visiting her old friends George Smith (the former Stunt-Master) and Richard Fenster in San Francisco, Black Widow was spending the day with them. When a squadron of Ultron Sentinels start attacking San Francisco and killing people, Richard becomes one of the victims while Black Widow and George escape. Afterwards, George Smith's tech-prosthetic arm fell under Ultron's control and he started obeying Ultron. Black Widow was forced to kill George Smith and was partially disfigured in the process. Captain Marvel is vacationing in London when the Ultron Sentinels invade. She fights them alongside Captain Britain and MI-13. After Computer Graham and Magic Boots Mel are killed, Captain Marvel and Captain Britain sacrifice their lives to destroy Ultron's main forces in London.

Victor Mancha was bringing some children to one of the Runaways' old bases in Los Angeles. Victor believes that if he uses his machine abilities, he will help Ultron’s victory. He does not tell any of his new-found friends about his background because he is afraid they will not accept him. In a flashback, it is shown that his Runaways teammates were all killed by Ultron and that Victor has stored digital versions of them in his memory banks. Victor decides to fight the Ultron Sentinels, deciding that if this is the end he will go down fighting.

After being rescued by Hawkeye, Otto Octavius (whose mind secretly took over Spider-Man's body weeks before Ultron's attack) reflects on how the world has gone bad following Ultron's invasion. Iron Man finds him and persuades him to assist the heroes. Iron Man reveals to Octavius a device he had developed during the time when he was the Director of S.H.I.E.L.D. The device in question can send a determined area through a portal into the Negative Zone, but lacks the Negative Zone tech to build the central device. The Baxter Building, which would have had the tech they needed, is gone, but Iron Man reveals that Max Modell has some of it at Horizon Labs. They plan to get inside Horizon so Octavius can build the Central Device while Quicksilver places the remaining parts around Ultron's fortress. Octavius and Quicksilver reach Horizon Labs, where they find Modell dead. Octavius decides to prepare his own counter-plan instead of staying with Iron Man's plan. While reaching through what he believes is Ultron, Octavius senses the pain and agony in the central unit is suffering. Octavius suddenly realizes that it is not Ultron, but someone being manipulated by him. Ultron's defenses push Octavius outside making him lose control of the Ultron Sentinels, forcing him to escape.

After traveling to the past, Wolverine and Invisible Woman discuss the plan of confronting Hank Pym about his creation of Ultron, with Invisible Woman reminding Wolverine that they must keep their actions at a minimum or risk causing a massive butterfly effect. In the middle of the trip, their car breaks down, so they locate an underground S.H.I.E.L.D. base to find an energy cell for the car and return to their mission. Upon entering the base, they take separate paths with Wolverine heading for the energy cell while the Invisible Woman searches for Pym's location. Wolverine bumps into a laboratory where a Brood was contained. Wolverine breaks it out of its confinement, but it attacks him and attempts to procreate inside his body. Wolverine fights the Brood and removes its offspring from his body. He then discovers that the other Brood in the laboratory have started to evolve and adapt from the damage inflicted by Wolverine's attacks. Meanwhile, Invisible Woman breaks into the surveillance room to find Pym's location. She discovers that S.H.I.E.L.D. has been monitoring every location, including the Baxter Building. She then starts having doubts about crossing the line and wonders if she should tell the past version of Mister Fantastic that S.H.I.E.L.D. has been monitoring him. Once their work is done, they both leave the S.H.I.E.L.D. base and head off to search for Pym with the roles reversed: Logan attempting to reason with Pym and Sue determined to do whatever it takes.

In the divergent timeline created by Hank Pym's death, Morgana le Fey and her husband Doctor Doom conquer half the planet. Le Fey and Doom's daughter Caroline recruits Hippolyta to seek revenge for abandoning her as a child. In Latveria, Caroline and Hippolyta discover that Doom has died and has been replaced by Hippolyta's father Ares. Hippolyta defeats Ares and takes back command of the Amazons (who were subdued by Ares).

== Titles involved ==
Title	Issue(s)	Citation(s)
Core miniseries
Age of Ultron	#1-10	
Tie-ins
Fantastic Four	#5AU	
The Superior Spider-Man	#6AU	
Avengers Assemble	#14AU-15AU	
Wolverine & the X-Men	#27AU	
Ultron	#1AU	
Uncanny Avengers	#8AU	
Fearless Defenders	#4AU	
Epilogue
Age of Ultron	#10AI	

== Collected editions ==
Title	Material collected	Published date	ISBN
Age of Ultron (Hardcover)	Age of Ultron #1-10, #10AI, Avengers Assemble #14AU-15AU, Fantastic Four #5AU, Fearless Defenders #4AU, Superior Spider-Man #6AU, Ultron #1AU, Uncanny Avengers #8AU, Wolverine & the X-Men #27AU	September 2013	978-0785155652
Age of Ultron (Paperback)	Avengers #12.1, Age of Ultron #1-10	May 2014	978-1846535406
Age of Ultron Companion	Avengers Assemble #14AU-15AU, Fantastic Four #5AU, Fearless Defenders #4AU, Superior Spider-Man #6AU, Ultron #1AU, Uncanny Avengers #8AU, Wolverine & the X-Men #27AU, Age of Ultron #10AI	May 2014	978-0785184850
What If? Age of Ultron	What If? Age of Ultron #1-5	July 2014	978-0785190547
Age of Ultron vs. Marvel Zombies	Age of Ultron vs. Zombies #1-4, Age of Ultron #1	November 2015	978-0785198635

== Other versions ==
=== What If? ===
A five-issue What If? miniseries centered on the Age of Ultron storyline. Four issues depict what would have happened if one of the other original five Avengers – counting Captain America rather than the Hulk as a founder – had died instead of Pym, and the fifth explores a world where Pym is the last surviving human under Ultron's reign. The series has been collected in paperback.

=== Secret Wars (2015) ===
A world based on the future of Age of Ultron appears in Secret Wars as a domain of Battleworld. It is later established that this is not the "Age of Ultron" seen in the original storyline, but another world in which Ultron killed Pym immediately after achieving sentience. It eliminated Dane Whitman when he tried to infiltrate the Masters of Evil and killed the Avengers before creating a drone army that overwhelmed the remaining heroes.

== In other media ==
=== Film ===
The Marvel Cinematic Universe film Avengers: Age of Ultron features Ultron as the titular main antagonist. However, the film is not based on the comic book, simply borrowing its title.

=== Television ===
The first season of the animated Marvel Cinematic Universe / Disney+ series What If...? (2021) features an adaptation of the "Age of Ultron" storyline. In an alternate timeline depicted in the episode "What If... Ultron Won?", Ultron is successful during the events of Avengers: Age of Ultron; he transfers his consciousness into Vision's body and launches a nuclear holocaust that kills the human race, including most of the Avengers. He later kills Thanos and obtains all the Infinity Stones, using them to extend his campaign of destruction to other planets. After eliminating all life in the universe, Ultron feels that he no longer has a purpose, until he learns about the Watcher and the existence of other realities. After fighting the Watcher in the Nexus of All Realities, Ultron gains access to the entire Multiverse and begins traveling to other timelines in order to destroy them as well. In the following episode, "What If... the Watcher Broke His Oath?", the Watcher assembles alternate reality versions of Doctor Strange, Peggy Carter, T'Challa, Thor, Erik Killmonger, Gamora, and Natasha Romanoff to stop Ultron. Ultimately, Arnim Zola takes control of Ultron's body, erasing the latter's consciousness. Zola and Killmonger then attempt to seize the Infinity Stones but are trapped in a pocket dimension, which Strange promises to watch over.
