= It's Over 9000! =

Internet meme stemming from a quote in Dragon Ball Z

Example of the "It's Over 9000!" meme, which depicts an image macro of Vegeta crushing his scouter

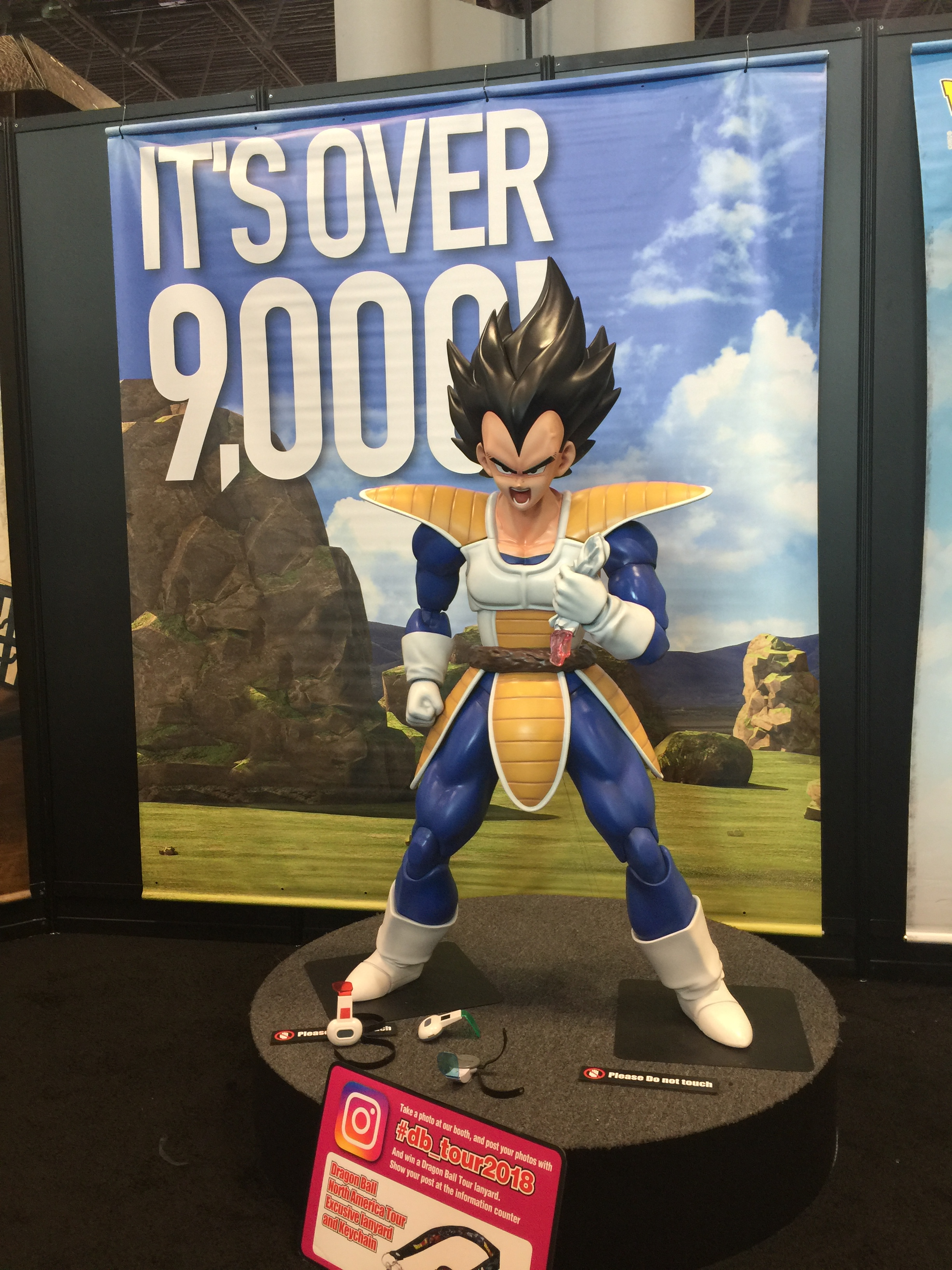
An "It's Over 9000!" display at the 2018 New York Comic Con

"It's Over 9000!", also known simply as "Over 9000!", is an Internet meme that became popular in 2006, involving a change made for English localizations of an episode of the Dragon Ball Z anime television series titled "The Return of Goku", which originally aired in the United States on April 19, 1997. The phrase is typically used as an innumerable quantifier to describe a large quantity of something. Variations of the phrase are also employed as a form of trolling.

The phrase refers to an alteration of the original line spoken in Japanese by the Saiyan character Vegeta, voiced in English by actor Brian Drummond, in the 21st episode of the Ocean Productions English dub. In the original Japanese and English-translated manga as well as the original Japanese anime series, the power level of series protagonist Son Goku is actually read as "over 8000!" (8000以上だ…!, Hassen ijō da…!) (Japanese pronunciation: [hasːeɴ iʑoː da]).

== Origins and analysis ==
In the Dragon Ball franchise, all beings possess ki, a vital force present in all life; beings with high levels of ki can use it to perform supernatural feats, including in combat. Some beings are capable of sensing the Power Level or Battle Power (戦闘力, Sentō-ryoku) of others, denoting their strength as a combatant. Aliens serving the galactic tyrant Frieza possess "scouters," devices that duplicate this ability technologically and can quantify different combatants' power levels objectively, though warriors can employ ki-manipulation techniques to mask the full extent of their strength. In the episode "The Return of Goku," Goku returns to the Earth after intense training in the Other World to confront Vegeta and his comrade Nappa. As Goku powers up in rage after learning they had killed his allies Yamcha, Tenshinhan, Chaozu, and Piccolo right before his arrival, Vegeta senses an explosive increase in his power level through his scouter device. In response to Nappa's query about Goku's power level, Vegeta yells: "It's over nine thousand!", crushing his scouter in his fist.

In the original Japanese version of the scene, and most versions subbed in languages other than English, Vegeta actually says "It's over 8000!". This has occurred several other times where power levels are given more as estimates than accurate figures. Craig Elvy from Screenrant claimed that this phrase is actually a mistranslation from the original Japanese anime. He noted that the Daizenshuu 7 book quoted the dubbing team as saying that speaking "9000" in English was a better fit for Vegeta's animated mouth movements; on the other hand, Elvy made the assertion that Dragon Ball Z's Ocean dub "was notorious for making translation errors (such as Goku believing Vegeta killed Grandpa Gohan or Bardock being a so-called "great scientist") which can't be explained away so easily". When Dragon Ball Z was re-dubbed by Funimation with Christopher Sabat as the voice of Vegeta, the "It's Over 9000" line was retained, and has featured in most English re-dubs and video games ever since.

== Spread ==
A YouTube Poop of the scene from the episode was originally uploaded by YouTuber Weston "Kajetokun" Durant on October 17, 2006, as an inside joke for his friends, making fun of how Drummond phrased the English line to fit Vegeta's on-screen mouth movements, which were animated to fit the original Japanese line. He was surprised when he discovered that the video had attracted 20,000 views the following day. The video was later linked to by the front page of the VG Cats website, where it attracted a further 200,000 views. The popularity of the meme quickly spread, inspiring a series of remix videos on YouTube, various image macros and demotivational posters on 4chan, as well as parody sites dedicated to the phrase. The meme's notoriety reached its initial peak in 2007, when 4chan moderators implemented a word filter that would turn any mentions of the number 7 into "over 9000". The most viewed video clip uploaded on YouTube which references the phrase has received over 15 million views to date; various parodies and spoofs of the clip receive a large number of views on YouTube as well.

According to Elvy, the "It's over 9000!" phrase has attained recognition to the point that it has become one of internet culture's favorite phrases. The absence of the "It's Over 9000" phrase in the 2020 game Dragon Ball Z: Kakarot was considered conspicuous by Paul Tamburro of GameRevolution, who argued that the meme is iconic and immensely popular to warrant its inclusion or reference, even if the phrase itself may have originated as a mistranslation.

== Cultural depictions ==
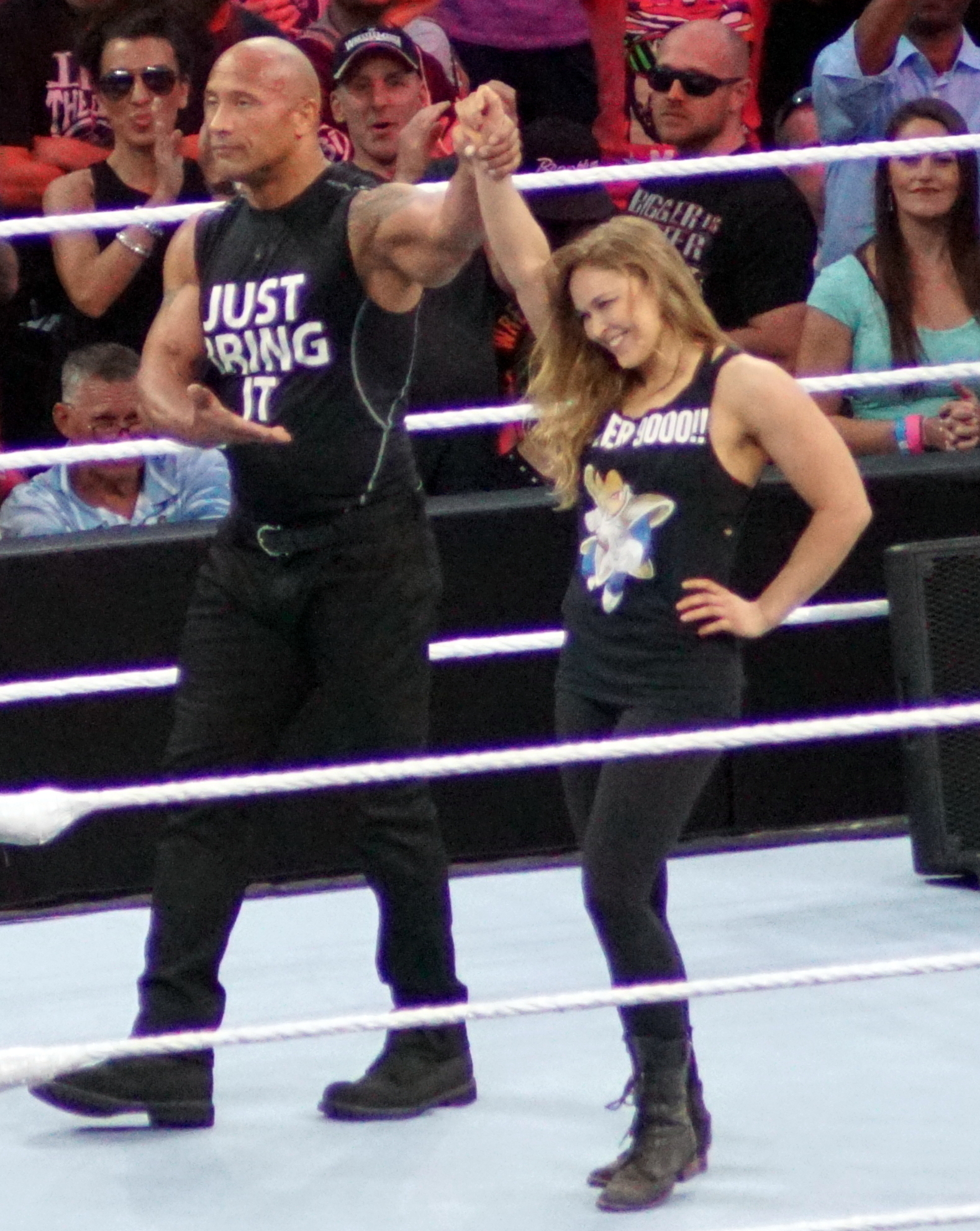
Ronda Rousey (right, with Dwayne Johnson), wearing her tank top which referenced Vegeta and the phrase

In addition to being referenced in discussions of English-language Dragon Ball media, the "It's Over 9000!" meme has also influenced various topic discussions and fictional works unrelated to the Dragon Ball series. Examples of intertextual references include coverage of the PlayStation 3 demo for Final Fantasy XIII by Gamezone, a reference in season 2 episode 17 of DuckTales, and an easter egg in the 2020 game Doom Eternal. American professional wrestler Xavier Woods disclosed in a 2013 interview that he always has the phrase printed on his wrestling attire. For her appearance at WrestleMania 31, American professional athlete Ronda Rousey wore a tank top which referenced Vegeta and the phrase.

In September 2008, an anonymous troll left a message on the official message board of The Oprah Winfrey Show, claiming to be part of a pedophile network with "over 9000 penises" that were "all raping children". Talk show host Oprah Winfrey took the post at face value and read it to her audience on air. A video clip of Winfrey's message to her audience was promptly uploaded to YouTube, but was quickly removed due to a copyright claim by Harpo, Inc. In spite of that, numerous remix videos featuring Winfrey's mention of "9000 penises" continued to surface on YouTube.

== See also ==
- Cultural impact of Dragon Ball
