= Avengers A.I. =

Marvel Superhero Comic Book Series

- Cover of Avengers A.I. #1 (July 2013). Art by Andre Lima Araujo

Publication information
- Publisher: Marvel Comics
- Schedule: Monthly
- Format: Ongoing series
- Genre: Superhero
- Publication date: July 2013 – April 2014
- No. of issues: 12
- Main character(s): Hank Pym (leader); Alexis The Protector; Doombot; Victor Mancha; Vision

Creative team
- Created by: Sam Humphries; Andre Lima Araujo
- Written by: Sam Humphries
- Artist: Andre Lima Araujo

Avengers A.I. is a comic book series published by Marvel Comics that was released in July 2013, as part of the company's Marvel NOW! initiative. The series takes place after the events of Age of Ultron, where the world has been colonized by A.I.s "who may or may not have positive feelings about the way humanity has been treating them for the past 100 years." The series ended in April 2014.

== Publication history ==
Marvel Comics announced Avengers A.I. by the creative team of Sam Humphries and Andre Lima Araujo in March 2013. Humphries has confirmed that Hank Pym and Vision will lead a team consisting of Victor Mancha, a Doombot and a debuting character, Alexis The Protector, with Monica Chang featured as a liaison to the team. The second arc, which began in issue #8, explored the origin of Alexis and added Captain America and Rogue to the team. The series was canceled after 12 issues.

== History ==
In the aftermath of the Age of Ultron storyline, the computer virus that Hank Pym used to destroy Ultron has evolved into Dimitrios. S.H.I.E.L.D.'s A.I. Division Chief Monica Chang is sent to find a way to destroy Dimitrios after it started mounting cyber attacks against secure military and intelligence targets. Monica Chang enlists Henry Pym to help her stop Dimitrios and they form the Avengers A.I. consisting of a Doombot, Victor Mancha and Vision. During their first mission, the Avengers A.I. faced hijacked S.H.I.E.L.D. Drones which attacked a hospital in Atlanta. The Avengers A.I. managed to find the mysterious synthezoid named Alexis the drones were looking for before they could find her.

Alexis' memory banks have been locked and are now inaccessible to her as she has no memory prior to her discovery in the hospital. After Vision did a couple of scans he discovered that she does not fit the physical profile of a robot, cyborg, or android, she doesn't have the right energy signature to be a human and that she exists on several quantum layers. With the help of a Life Model Decoy named Joanie, Dimitrios takes over Iron Man's Safe Armor upon feeling sympathy for it based on how Tony Stark rejected it for becoming self-aware. In this new body, Dimitrios was able to send several attacks towards Henry Pym and the Avengers A.I. with one of them being the Kilgore Sentinel that Dimitrios had reprogrammed to cause as much havoc as possible. After the Kilgore Sentinel was destroyed by S.H.I.E.L.D. upon Vision reprogramming it, the Avengers A.I. discover that Dimitrios has two goals: to find Alexis and to destroy the human race. Vision explores Diamond, the home of Dimitrios and has to make a choice to help the humans or the Avengers A.I. Even though Vision wants to be with the Avengers A.I. world and its citizens, he has to help the humans because the Avengers A.I. want to go to war. While investigating the physical location that hosts the Diamond, Victor Mancha is damaged.

All Avengers A.I. members at this point think that Victor has died, as he tried to prevent an oil rig from exploding. Hank Pym takes the loss the hardest and secludes himself in his lab for days. During this time he starts to hear a faint buzz in his lab and starts to try to find its source. When he does finally find the source of the buzz, he recognizes it as morse code for: "Froot Loops", which was something he mentioned to Victor in their last conversation before going on the oil rig mission, and so he realizes that Victor survived the blast and is somewhere in the Diamond. We also learn that Alexis is one of the SIX. The SIX are the first 6 A.I. constructs created by the computer virus Hank Pym used against Ultron. Alexis is known as the Protector, and Dimitrios The Tactician is another member of the SIX, who is set on conquering the Universe and wiping out any trace of humanity.

Pym and Doombot help clean up after the Infinity crossover. Meanwhile, back at the Diamond, Victor enlists the help of a rogue A.I.. Captain America, Rogue, Vision, Doombot, and Pym hack themselves into the Diamond in order to delete a rogue app that causes users to riot. Alexis then meets with other members of the SIX and is able to see 10,000 years into the future. She learns that Dimitrios hacks into S.H.I.E.L.D. and destroys humanity. Only the Avengers A.I. survive to face him on a makeshift spaceship made from the carcass of Galactus. He almost destroys the universe, but Chang prevents the execution of a rogue LMD infected with a nano virus from affecting S.H.I.E.L.D.. The Avengers vow to respect all life forms, artificial and organic, and the Diamond is left in peace.

== Collected editions ==
Avengers A.I. has been collected in the following paperbacks:

Title	Material collected	Publication date	ISBN
Avengers A.I. Vol. 1: Human After All	Avengers A.I. #1-6	January 2014	978-0785184911
Avengers A.I. Vol. 2: 12,000 A.D.	Avengers A.I. #7.INH, 8-12	July 2014	978-0785184928
