= Higher Earth =

Publication information
- Publisher: Boom! Studios
- Format: Ongoing series
- Genre: see below
- Publication date: May 2012
- No. of issues: 9
- Main character(s): Heide and Rex

Higher Earth is a science fiction comic book published by Boom! Studios. It is written by Sam Humphries, an established writer for Marvel whose previous work has included co-writing Ultimate Comics: The Ultimates. The artwork is provided by Francesco Biagini, who has previously illustrated Elric: The Balance Lost. The first issue was released on 9 May 2012.

The first printing sold out at the distributor level on 2 May, seven days before the official release. A second print run was undertaken, with the US price remaining at a single dollar.

1. Vol. 1: #1 - #5. "When the final frontier proves to be a desolate wasteland, mankind turns its sights toward (...) alternate Earths." - WorldCat - ISBN 1608862909.
2. Vol. 2: #6 - #9. "Heidi (a girl born in garbage) must ally herself with the last person she ever suspected, an ex-soldier. But can they be trusted, or has Heidi lost sight of the truth?" - WorldCat - ISBN 1608863042.

== Story ==
The series is a follow on from Humphries's 2011 comic series, Our Love is real, which was published by Image Comics.

The story is set in a multiverse where many parallel Earths exist, one of which is Higher Earth: a world that has conquered 99 other Earths from alternative timelines. It revolves around a girl named Heidi and a rogue soldier called Rex. Rex is present from the opening scene where he is falling from the sky onto an alternative Earth which has been designated a "junk" world. He is introduced as being committed to a quest of vengeance against an unspecified opponent. Heidi is introduced as a tough young woman who so far has only known the "junk" Earth, where garbage is continually falling out of the sky.

== Reception ==
Trinidad and Tobago Newsday wrote that the comic had already received "rave reviews", only days after the first issue was released. Several reviewers however did note that the story from issue one is somewhat "embryonic", suggesting that it is too early to be sure whether its potential will be realised. Newsarama praise the artwork for its sense of daring and sharpness. Greg McElhatton of Comic Book Resources also praised the artwork stating Biagini's art is good; it's very expressive and the panel progression is smooth. Marcus Doidge however gives the comic only 3.5 out of 5, saying the artwork is "solid but never all that remarkable".
