= Avengers Infinity =

2000 Marvel Comics series

- The Avengers observe one of the entities the Infinites on the cover of Avengers Infinity #3 (Nov. 2000). Art by Sean Chen.

Publication information
- Publisher: Marvel Comics
- Schedule: Monthly
- Format: Limited series
- Genre: Superhero
- Publication date: September – December 2000
- No. of issues: 4
- Main character(s): Avengers; Quasar; Jack of Hearts; Thor; Starfox; Tigra; Photon; Moondragon; Eternity

Creative team
- Written by: Roger Stern
- Penciller: Sean Chen
- Inker: Scott Hanna
- Letterer: Troy Peteri
- Colorist: Steve Oliff
- Editor(s): Tom Brevoort; Frank Dunkerley; Bob Harras

Avengers: Infinity is a four-issue American comic book limited series published from September to December 2000 by Marvel Comics. It was written by Roger Stern and drawn by Sean Chen, Scott Hanna, Steve Oliff and Troy Peteri.

== Publication history ==
Writer Roger Stern explained a number of the decisions that went into planning the series. On the diverse team lineup he said, "I just put together a list of Avengers who would be at loose ends, and who would be good choices for a big, cosmic adventure ... with a welcome bit of kibitzing from Kurt Busiek and Tom Brevoort."

The idea of the huge hand "came from the image that Carlos Pacheco gave us in Avengers Forever #10. Kurt and I had asked him for a shot of a gigantic hand bigger than the star it was reaching for -- and, boy, did he deliver!

The story also partly led into the "Maximum Security" storyline.

== Plot summary ==
The cosmic hero Quasar receives a distress call from a colony of the alien Rigellians in deep space. The character arrives to find the colony destroyed and a single survivor, the superhero Jack of Hearts, who is in a coma. Quasar summons all nearby members of the superhero team the Avengers, and the Thunder God Thor, the Titanian Eternal Starfox, heroines Tigra and Photon, and outsider Moondragon respond.

When the heroes arrive on the planet, Moondragon scans Jack's mind and detects a single word: Infinites. The heroes are then attacked by thousands of robots, and eventually retreat via ship into space as the artificial life forms seem to be forming from the planet itself. Moondragon continues to scan Jack's mind and learns the robots' purpose is to break down the entire planet into a molten mass. The planet's crust is breached by the robots and as it becomes molten ore, Jack of Hearts wakes and states that the master of the robot hordes has arrived. A spatial rift opens, and a being the size of a planet emerges.

The Avengers—at microscopic size compared to the entity–breach its head and attempt to reach the brain to learn more and possibly neutralize it. As the Avengers battle more of the same robots within the entity, Tigra watches as it shapes the molten ore into a cylinder. Several more beings of the same size and scope arrive, bearing similar cylinders, which Tigra assumes are former planets. The group fuses with the cylinders to form a huge circular ring that clamps the star close to the original planet the Avengers visited. Another spatial rift opens and an even larger hand appears and begins to drag away the entire galaxy.

The characters retreat from the entity, now part of the colossal ring. Moondragon determines the entire construct is called a Walker, and being dragging away the galaxy an Infinite. She suggests summoning the cosmic entity Eternity to stop the act. Quasar is able to call Eternity, and the entity wrestles with the hand before travelling with the Avengers to the Dimension of Manifestations, where cosmic entities converse. The Infinites claim they are rearranging galaxies to improve the flow of energy, and Eternity advises them that this would be fatal to all affected life forms.

The Avengers each make a case for the sanctity of life. The Infinites explain that they were ignorant of the fact that life could exist on planets. They abandon their plan, and one of them sacrifices itself to restore all destroyed planets. The Avengers are transported back to the now recreated Rigellian colony, which is a paradise as animal life has yet to appear.
