= Rafael Marín =

Spanish novelist, translator and comic book writer (born 1959)

Rafael Marín Trechera (Cádiz, Spain, 1959) is a Spanish novelist, translator, comic book writer and co-plotter.

He is best known in the United States for his work with artist Carlos Pacheco on the Fantastic Four Vol.3 title in 2000 and 2001, and The Inhumans with José Ladronn and Jorge Lucas. For the Spanish market he wrote the mini-series Iberia Inc and Triada Vértice, as well as the 12-issue historical graphic novels, still in process, 12 del Doce. He is also a well-known scholar on comics history.

== Novels and anthologies ==
- Lágrimas de luz (1984)
- Unicornios sin cabeza (1987)
- Trilogy La Leyenda del Navegante: Crisei, Arce and Génave (1992)
- El muchacho inca (1993)
- Ozymandias (1996)
- Mundo de dioses (1998)
- Contra el tiempo (2001, with Juan Miguel Aguilera)
- La piel que te hice en el aire (2001)
- La sed de las panteras (2002)
- El centauro de piedra (2002)
- Detective sin licencia (2004)
- Elemental, querido Chaplin (2005)
- La leyenda del Navegante (2006, omnibus)
- Juglar (2006)
- El anillo en el agua (2008)
- Piel de fantasma (2010)
- La ciudad enmascarada (2011)
- El niño de Samarcanda (2011)
- Las campanas de Almanzor (2011)
- Oceanum (2012, with Juan Miguel Aguilera) )
- Los espejos turbios (2012)
- Lona de tinieblas (2013)
- Está lleno de estrellas (2015)
- Mobtel (2015)
- Son de piedra y otros relatos (2015)
- Don Juan (2015)

=== Essays on comics ===
- Los Cómics Marvel (1996, second edition 2000)
- Hal Foster: Una épica post-romántica (2004)
- Spider-Man: El superhéroe en nuestro reflejo (2007)
- Los cómics del exilio (2008)
- W de Watchmen (2009)
- Marvel: Crónica de una época (2016)

Preceded by John Francis Moore	Fantastic Four writer 2000–2001 (with Carlos Pacheco) (with Carlos Pacheco & Jeph Loeb in 2001–2002) (with Carlos Pacheco & Karl Kesel in 2002)	Succeeded by Karl Kesel
