= Arrowsmith (comics) =

Fantasy comic book series

Cover to Arrowsmith #1, art by Carlos Pacheco and Jesus Merino

Arrowsmith is a fantasy comic book series by writer Kurt Busiek and penciller Carlos Pacheco that reimagines World War I in a world in which magic, dragons, and other magical beings exist. A six-issue series was published by WildStorm's Cliffhanger imprint in 2003 to generally positive reviews. A second six-issue series was published by Image Comics in 2022, also to positive reviews; it was one of Pacheco's last published works.

== Plot ==
The series is set in an alternate Earth in which magic is real. Set during that world's analog of the First World War, the United States of Columbia fights using dragons, spells, vampires, and all other forms of magic. The protagonist Fletcher Arrowsmith joins the war effort on the side of the Allies, gets taught the rudiments of sorcery, and engages in some brutal battles with the enemy Prussians. In the second series, Fletcher is sent on a secret mission behind enemy lines.

== Publication history ==
The original limited series ran for six issues in 2003. It garnered positive reviews, holding a score of 7.8 out of 10 at the review aggregator website Comic Book Roundup. In 2006, Busiek revealed that he and Pacheco hoped to produce more Arrowsmith projects, and stated in 2008 that they were working on an illustrated prose novel to be sub-titled Far From the Fields We Know, but this was never published. Busiek and Pacheco produced a second series, titled Arrowsmith: Behind Enemy Lines, which started in January 2022. It received a score of 8.4 out of 10 at Comic Book Roundup. Pacheco died in November 2022, and this was one of his last published works.

== Collected editions ==
- Arrowsmith Book One: So Smart In Their Fine Uniforms, Arrowsmith issues #1–6 and 'The Sound of Distant Guns' prelude from 'Astro City/Arrowsmith' flip-book (hardcover: ISBN 1-53432-206-X, paperback: ISBN 1-53439-961-5)
- Arrowsmith Volume 2: Behind Enemy Lines, Arrowsmith: Behind Enemy Lines issues #1–6 (paperback: ISBN 1-53432-316-3)
