= The Avengers (comic book) =

Comic book titles by Marvel Comics

- The Avengers #1 (September 1963). Cover art by Jack Kirby and Dick Ayers featuring the five original members of the team: Ant-Man, the Wasp, Iron Man, Hulk, and Thor.

Publication information
- Publisher: Marvel Comics
- Schedule: Monthly (vols. 1–4, 6–9); Semi-monthly (vol. 5)
- Format: Ongoing series
- Genre: Superhero
- Publication date: (vol. 1); September 1963 – September 1996 (vol. 2); November 1996 – November 1997 (vol. 3); February 1998 – August 2004 (vol. 1 cont.); September – December 2004 (vol. 4); July 2010 – January 2013 (vol. 5); February 2013 – June 2015 (vol. 6); December 2015 - December 2016 (vol. 7); January 2017 – June 2018 (vol. 8); July 2018 – May 2023 (vol. 9); July 2023 – present
- No. of issues: (vol. 1): 402 and 23 Annuals (vol. 2): 13 (vol. 3): 84 and 4 Annuals (vol. 1 cont.): 4 (#500-503) (vol. 4): 36 (#1–34 plus #12.1 and #24.1) and 1 Annual (vol. 5): 46 (#1–44 plus #34.1 and #34.2) and 1 Annual (vol. 6): 15 and 1 Annual (vol. 7): 36 (#1–11, #672-690 plus #1.1–5.1 and #1.MU) (vol. 8): 66 (vol. 9): 3 (#1–20) and 2 annuals (as of January 2025 cover date)

The Avengers is an American comic book series published by Marvel Comics that features the superhero team Avengers. The series first appeared in The Avengers no. 1 in September 1963, created by writer Stan Lee and artist Jack Kirby. It was developed as a team title that brought together established Marvel characters. It has since become one of the publisher’s longest-running and most prominent franchises.

The series has been relaunched and renumbered multiple times, reflecting changes in creative direction, continuity and publishing strategy. Its roster has included various characters, including Iron Man, Thor, the Hulk, Ant-Man, the Wasp, and Captain America, along with many others added over time. Stories usually focus on large-scale threats which individual heroes cannot face alone, a structure that helped define the team’s role in the larger Marvel Universe.

== Publication history ==
In 1960, DC Comics launched a comic book series featuring a team of superheroes called the Justice League. Impressed by that book's strong sales, Martin Goodman, the owner of Marvel Comics predecessor Timely Comics, asked Stan Lee to create a title featuring a similar team of superheroes for Marvel. Lee recounts in Origins of Marvel Comics:

Martin mentioned that he had noticed one of the titles published by National Comics seemed to be selling better than most. It was a book called The [sic] Justice League of America and it was composed of a team of superheroes. ... 'If the Justice League is selling,' spoke he, 'why don't we put out a comic book that features a team of superheroes?'

Much like the Justice League, the Avengers were an assemblage of pre-existing superhero characters created by Lee and Jack Kirby. Kirby did the artwork for the first eight issues only, in addition to doing the layouts for issues #14–16. This initial series, published bi-monthly through issue #6 (July 1964) and monthly thereafter, ran through issue #402 (Sept. 1996), with spinoffs including several annuals, miniseries and a giant-size quarterly sister series that ran briefly in the mid-1970s. Marvel filed for a trademark for "The Avengers" in 1967 and the United States Patent and Trademark Office issued the registration in 1970.

Between 1996 and 2004, Marvel relaunched the primary Avengers title three times. In 1996, the "Heroes Reborn" line, in which Marvel contracted outside companies to produce four titles, included a new volume of The Avengers. It took place in an alternate universe, with a revamped history unrelated to mainstream Marvel continuity. The Avengers vol. 2 was written by Rob Liefeld and penciled by Jim Valentino, and ran for 13 issues (Nov. 1996–Nov. 1997). The final issue, which featured a crossover with the other Heroes Reborn titles, returned the characters to the main Marvel Universe.

The Avengers vol. 3 relaunched and ran for 84 issues from February 1998 to August 2004. To coincide with what would have been the 500th issue of the original series, Marvel changed the numbering, and The Avengers #500-503 (Sept.– Dec. 2004), the one-shot Avengers Finale (Jan. 2005) became the "Avengers Disassembled" storyline and final issues. Avengers vol. 4 debuted in July 2010 and ran until January 2013. Vol. 5 was launched in February 2013. After Secret Wars, a new Avengers team debuted, dubbed the All-New, All-Different Avengers, starting with a Free Comic Book Day preview.

=== 1960s ===
"And there came a day, a day unlike any other, when Earth's mightiest heroes and heroines found themselves united against a common threat. On that day, the Avengers were born—to fight the foes no single super hero could withstand! Through the years, their roster has prospered, changing many times, their glory has never been denied! Heed the call, then—for now, the Avengers Assemble!"

— Prologue from The Avengers used in the 1970s

In the first issue, the Avengers team began with Ant-Man (Hank Pym), Hulk (Bruce Banner), Iron Man (Anthony Stark), Thor, and the Wasp (Janet van Dyne). The roster changed almost immediately after the first issue; in the second issue, Ant-Man became Giant-Man, and at the end of the issue, Hulk quit the team. Issue #4 brought the title's first major milestone: the revival and return of Captain America (Steve Rogers).

=== 1970s ===
The creative team of writer Roy Thomas and artist John Buscema introduced new characters such as Arkon in issue #75 (April 1970) and Red Wolf in #80 (Sept. 1970). The team's adventures increased in scope as the team crossed into an alternate dimension and battled the Squadron Supreme, and fought in the Kree-Skrull War, which guest-starred the Kree hero Captain Marvel (Mar-Vell). Novelist Harlan Ellison plotted two stories for the series. The first ("The Summons of Psyklop") was published in issue #88 (May 1971) and the second ("Five Dooms to Save Tomorrow") in #101 (July 1972).

Writer Steve Englehart introduced Mantis, who joined the team along with the reformed Swordsman.

During the summer of 1973, Englehart and artists Bob Brown and Sal Buscema produced "The Avengers-Defenders Clash" storyline which crossed over between the two team titles. This eight-issue story was the first summertime cross-title event, and was very popular with readers.

George Pérez became the title's artist with issue #141 (Nov. 1975) which saw the start of a seven-part story featuring the Squadron Supreme and the Serpent Crown. In 2010, Comics Bulletin ranked Englehart's run on The Avengers eighth on its list of the "Top 10 1970s Marvels".

After Englehart departed and a seven-issue stint by Gerry Conway, Jim Shooter began as writer, generating several classic adventures, including "The Bride of Ultron", the "Nefaria Trilogy", and "The Korvac Saga". Shooter introduced the character of Henry Peter Gyrich, the Avengers' liaison to the United States National Security Council. The true origins of Quicksilver and the Scarlet Witch were revealed in a three-part story that ran in issues #185-187 (July-Sept. 1979).

=== 1980s ===
The first major development was the breakdown of Hank Pym, which writer Roger Stern resolved by having Pym outwit Egghead and defeat the latest incarnation of the Masters of Evil single-handedly. Pym proved his innocence.

Stern developed several major storylines, such as "Ultimate Vision"; the formation of the West Coast Avengers; and "Avengers Under Siege". Rogue, who would later become a member of the X-Men, was introduced in The Avengers Annual #10 (1981) by writer Chris Claremont and artist Michael Golden.

Stern created the villain, Nebula, who falsely claimed to be the granddaughter of Thanos. Following Stern's departure, Walt Simonson wrote the series briefly but left due to editorial conflicts.

John Byrne took over writing both West Coast Avengers and The Avengers and merged the two separate Avengers teams into one team with two bases. Byrne's contributions included a revamping of the Vision, and the discovery that the children of the Scarlet Witch and the Vision were actually illusions. The Avengers titles in late 1989 were involved in the major crossover event "Acts of Vengeance".

=== 1990s ===
The Avengers vol. 2, #11 (Sept. 1997), showing the Heroes Reborn Avengers. Cover art by Michael Ryan and Sal Regla.

Bob Harras and Steve Epting took over the title in the summer of 1991 and introduced a stable lineup with ongoing story lines and character development. Their primary antagonists in this run were the mysterious Proctor and his team of other-dimensional Avengers known as the Gatherers.

This culminated in "Operation: Galactic Storm", a 19-part storyline that ran through all Avengers-related titles and showcased a conflict between the Kree and the Shi'ar Empire.

Marvel contracted out The Avengers and three related titles — Captain America, Fantastic Four, and Iron Man to former Marvel artists Jim Lee and Rob Liefeld, two of the founding creators of Image Comics. While The Avengers was relaunched as a new series, the "Heroes Reborn" line ended after a year as planned and the license reverted to Marvel.

Writer Kurt Busiek and penciler George Pérez launched a new volume of the series with The Avengers vol. 3, #1 (Feb. 1998). Busiek concurrently wrote the limited series Avengers Forever. Busiek's run included many of the Avengers' traditional villains.

=== 2000s ===
Successor writer Geoff Johns dealt with the aftermath of Busiek's Kang arc, as the Avengers were granted international authority by the United Nations. Chuck Austen followed as writer. Writer Brian Michael Bendis then rebooted the series with the "Avengers Disassembled" storyline.

=== 2010s ===
The "Heroic Age" roster of the Avengers. Cover art for Avengers vol. 4, #12.1, by Bryan Hitch.

All four Avengers series (The Mighty Avengers, New Avengers, Dark Avengers, and Avengers: The Initiative) were canceled, and a new ongoing series titled Avengers was launched in May 2010, written by Brian Michael Bendis and penciled by John Romita Jr.

In 2012, a biweekly Avengers title was launched, written by Jonathan Hickman and drawn by different artists for each story arc. After "Secret Wars", a new Avengers title (vol. 6) dubbed the All-New, All-Different Avengers launched in 2015 written by Mark Waid, with alternating artwork by Mahmud Asrar and Adam Kubert, and covers by Alex Ross. Mark Waid and Alex Ross continued with Avengers vol. 7, which launched in 2017, with artwork by Mike del Mundo.

It was relaunched once again in 2018 as part of Marvel's "Fresh Start" relaunch featuring a creative by Jason Aaron (w) and Ed McGuinness (pen).

== Contributors ==
=== Vol. 1 (1963–1996, 2004, 2017–2018) ===
==== Writers ====
Years	Writer	Issues
1963–1966	Stan Lee	#1–34
1966–1972, 1975, 1990-1991	Roy Thomas	#35-104, #132, Annual #1-2, #19-20, Giant-Size Avengers #3
1971, 1972	Harlan Ellison	#88, #101
1972, 1981	Chris Claremont	#102, Annual #10
1972-1976	Steve Englehart	#105-135, #137-144, #147-152, Giant-Size Avengers #2-4
1975	Reprint of Amazing Adventures (vol. 2) #12	#136
1976	Tony Isabella	#145-146
1976-1977	Gerry Conway	#151-157, Annual #6
1976-1982, 1986	Jim Shooter	#151, #156, #158-168, #170-177, #188, #200-202, #204, #211-222, #224, #266
1977	Jim Starlin	Annual #7
1978	Roger Slifer	Annual #8
1978	Marv Wolfman	#169
1978-1982, 1991	David Michelinie	#173, #175-176, #181-187, #189, #191-205, #221, #223, #340
1978-1979, 1981	Bill Mantlo	#174, #188, #206, #210, Annual #9
1978	Steve Gerber	#178
1979, 1987	Tom DeFalco	#179-180, Annual #16
1979, 1988-1990	Mark Gruenwald	#185-187, #189, #290, #301-303, #325
1979, 1982	Steven Grant	#185-187, #189-190, #225-226
1979-1980, 1983-1988	Roger Stern	#189-190, #201, #227-279, #281-287, Annual #13-14
1981	Bob Budiansky	#207-208
1981, 1986, 1989	Danny Fingeroth	#207-208, #304, Annual #15
1981	J. M. DeMatteis	#209
1987, 1991-1996	Bob Harras	#280, #334-339, #343-351, #355-369, #372-375, #378-382, #384-395
1988-1989	Ralph Macchio	#287-290, #301-303
1988-1989	Walt Simonson	#291-300, Annual #17
1989-1990	John Byrne	#305-317
1990-1991	Fabian Nicieza	#317-324, #341-342, Annual #18
1990-1991	Larry Hama	#326-333
1991	Scott Lobdell	#340
1992	Len Kaminski	#352–354
1993-1994	Glenn Herdling	#366, #370-371
1994	Joey Cavalieri	#376-377
1994-1995	George Pérez	#379-382 (Double Feature flip-book)
1995	Tom Brevoort	#383
1995	Mike Kanterovich	#383
1995-1996	Terry Kavanagh	#384-399
1996, 2017-2018	Mark Waid	#400-402, #672-690
2004	Brian Michael Bendis	#500-503
2018	Al Ewing	#675-690
2018	Jim Zub	#675-690

==== Pencilers ====
Years	Penciler	Issues
1963–1964	Jack Kirby	#1–8
1964-1967, 1973, 1976-1977	Don Heck	#9-15, #17-40, #45, #108-112, #145-146, #157, Annual #1-2, Giant-Size Avengers #4
1965	Dick Ayers	#16
1967-1972, 1974-1976, 1985-1989	John Buscema	#41–44, #46–47, #49–62, #74–77, #79–85, #94, #97, #105, #121, #124–125, #152-153, #255–279, #281–300
1967-1968, 1972-1973, 1975, 1977	George Tuska	#47–48, #51, #53–54, #106-107, #135, #137-140, #163
1969, 1981	Gene Colan	#63–65, #206–208, #210–211
1969, 1972	Barry Smith	#66-67, #98-100
1969-1972, 1974, 1977-1978, 1980, 1983	Sal Buscema	#68–72, #78, #86–92, #98, #127-134, #156, #158-159, #169, #172-173, #193, #227
1970	Frank Giacoia	#73
1970, 1976, 1990-1992	Herb Trimpe	#73 (uncredited), #333, Annual #6 (second story), #19, #21
1971-1972	Neal Adams	#93-96
1972, 1989	Rich Buckler	#101-104, #106, #302-304
1973, 1977	Jim Starlin	#107, Annual #7
1973-1974	Bob Brown	#113-120, #122-123, #126
1974-1975	Dave Cockrum	Giant-Size Avengers #2-3
1975	Reprint of Amazing Adventures (vol. 2) #12	#136
1975-1978, 1980	George Pérez	#141–144, #147–151, #154-155, #160–162, #167-168, #170-171, #194–196, #198–202, Annual #6, #8
1977, 1979-1980, 1983	John Byrne	#164-166, #181-191, #233
1978	David Wenzel	#174-177
1978, 1980-1981	Carmine Infantino	#178, #197, #203
1979	Jim Mooney	#179-180
1979, 1981	Don Newton	#204, Annual #9
1980	Arvell Jones	#192
1981	Alan Kupperberg	#205, #209, #212
1981-1982, 1985, 1987, 1989	Bob Hall	#213–214, #217, #219–221, #251–254, 280, #301, Annual #16
1982	Alan Weiss	#215-216
1982	Don Perlin	#218
1982	Greg LaRocque	#222-223, #225-226
1982	M. D. Bright	#224
1983-1984	Al Milgrom	#228–232, #234, #236–250
1983	Bob Budiansky	#235
1989-1991	Paul Ryan	#305-318, #320, #322, #324, #326–332
1990	Rik Levins	#319, #321, #323, #325
1991	Andy Kubert	#334
1991-1994	Steve Epting	#335–339, #341–347, #349–350, #355–361, #363–366, #368–369, #372–375
1991	Paul Abrams	#340
1992	Kirk Jarvinen	#348
1991-1992	Kevin West	#351, Annual #20
1992	M.C. Wyman	#352-354
1993	Gordon Purcell	#362
1993	Jim Hall	#367
1994	Geof Isherwood	#370
1994-1995	Mike Gustovich	#371, #383
1994	Grant Miehm	#376-377
1994	Stewart Johnson	#378-379
1994	Tom Grindberg	#379
1994-1995	Jeffrey Moore	#379-382 (Double Feature flip-book)
1994-1996	Mike Deodato	#380–382, #384–385, #387–388, #390–391, #393–395, #397–399, #401-402
1995	Angel Medina	#386
1995	Fabio Laguna	#389
1995	M.C. Wyman	#392
1996	John Statema	#396
1996	Mike Wieringo	#400
2004	David Finch	#500-503
2017-2018	Jesus Saiz	#672, #674
2018	Javier Pina	#673
2018	Paco Diaz	#673
2018	Pepe Larraz	#675-678, #689-690
2018	Kim Jacinto	#679-681, #688
2018	Mike Perkins	#681
2018	Sean Izaakse	#682
2018	Paco Medina	#683-687
2018	Joe Bennett	#684
2018	Stefano Caselli	#688

=== Vol. 2 (1996–1997) ===
==== Writers ====
Years	Writer	Issues
1996-1997	Rob Liefeld	#1-7
1996-1997	Jim Valentino	#1-4
1996-1997	Jeph Loeb	#2-7
1997	Walt Simonson	#8-12
1997	James Robinson	#13

==== Pencilers ====
Years	Penciler	Issues
1996-1997	Rob Liefeld	#1, #5
1996-1997	Chap Yaep	#1-5
1997	Ian Churchill	#4-7
1997	Michael Ryan	#8-13
1997	Anthony Winn	#12

=== Vol. 3 (1998–2004) ===
==== Writers ====
Years	Writer	Issues
1998-2002	Kurt Busiek	#0, #1-15, #19-56
1999	Jerry Ordway	#16-18
2002-2004	Geoff Johns	#57-76
2004	Chuck Austen	#77-84

==== Pencilers ====
Years	Penciler	Issues
1998-2000	George Pérez	#1-15, #19-25, #27-34
1999	Jerry Ordway	#16-18
1999-2000	Stuart Immonen	#0, #26
2000	John Romita Jr.	#35
2001	Steve Epting	#36-37
2001	Alan Davis	#38-43
2001	Manuel Garcia	#44-47
2002-2003	Kieron Dwyer	#48-50, #53-54, #57-60
2002	Brent Anderson	#51
2002-2003	Ivan Reis	#52, #64
2002	Patrick Zircher	#55
2002	Yanick Paquette	#56
2003	Gary Frank	#61-62
2003	Alan Davis	#63
2003-2004	Olivier Coipel	#65-70, #77-78, #80-81
2003-2004	Stephen Sadowski	#71, #76
2003-2004	Scott Kolins	#72-75, #82-84
2004	Sean Chen	#79

=== Vol. 4 (2010–2013) ===
==== Writers ====
Years	Writer	Issues
2010-2013	Brian Michael Bendis	#1-34, #12.1, #24.1

==== Pencilers ====
Years	Penciler	Issues
2010-2011	John Romita Jr.	#1-12, #14, #16-17
2011	Chris Bachalo	#13, #15
2011-2012	Daniel Acuña	#18-20, #23-24
2012	Renato Guedes	#21-22
2012-2013	Brandon Peterson	#24.1, #31-32, #34
2012	David Finch	#24.1
2012-2013	Walt Simonson	#25-30, #34
2012-2013	Mike Mayhew	#31-32, #34
2013	Terry Dodson	#33-34
2013	Olivier Coipel	#34
2013	Mike Deodato	#34
2013	Leinil Francis Yu	#34
2013	Jim Cheung	#34

=== Vol. 5 (2013–2015) ===
==== Writers ====
Years	Writer	Issues
2013-2015	Jonathan Hickman	#1-44
2013	Nick Spencer	#12-17
2014	Al Ewing	#34.1
2014	Sam Humphries	#34.2

==== Pencilers ====
Years	Penciler	Issues
2013	Jerome Opeña	#1-3
2013	Adam Kubert	#4-6
2013-2014	Dustin Weaver	#7-9, #35
2013-2015	Mike Deodato	#9-13, #24, #37, #39, #41
2013-2015	Stefano Caselli	#14-17, #36, #38, #40, #42-44
2013	Marco Rudy	#17
2013	Marco Checchetto	#17
2013-2014	Leinil Francis Yu	#18–23, #29-34
2014	Salvador Larroca	#25-28
2014	Dale Keown	#34.1
2014	Bengal	#34.2
2014	Jim Cheung	#35
2014	Nick Bradshaw	#35
2014	Paco Medina	#35
2015	Kev Walker	#44

=== Vol. 6 (2015–2016) ===
==== Writers ====
Years	Writer	Issues
2015-2016	Mark Waid	#0, #1-15, Annual #1
2016	Jeremy Whitley	#14

==== Pencilers ====
Years	Penciler	Issues
2016	Adam Kubert	#1-3, #7-8, #13-15
2015-2016	Mahmud A. Asrar	#0, #4-6, #9-12

=== Vol. 7 (2017) ===
==== Writers ====
Years	Writer	Issues
2017-2018	Mark Waid	#1-11, #1.1-5.1

==== Pencilers ====
Years	Penciler	Issues
2017	Mike del Mundo	#1-6, #9-11
2017	Phil Noto	#7-8
2017	Barry Kitson	#1.1-5.1
2017	Mark Bagley	#5.1
2017	Sean Izaakse	#5.1
2017	Ro Stein	#5.1

=== Vol. 8 (2018–2023) ===
==== Writers ====
Years	Writer	Issues
2018-2023	Jason Aaron	#1-66

==== Pencilers ====
Years	Penciler	Issues
2018–2019	Ed McGuinness	#1–6, #10–12, #18-20
2018–2019	David Marquez	#8-10, #14-17
2018	Paco Medina	#3
2018	Sara Pichelli	#7
2019	Adam Kubert	#10
2019	Frazer Irving	(vol. 8) #10
2019–2020	Andrea Sorrentino	#10, #13, #26
2019	Cory Smith	#11-12
2019	Jason Masters	#21
2019	Stefano Caselli	#22-25
2020–2021	Dale Keown	#26, #39
2020–2022	Ed McGuinness	#27-30, #32, #38, #50
2020	Paco Medina	#29
2020	Francesco Manna	#30, #32
2020–2023	Javier Garrón	#33-37, #40-41, #43-44, #46-50, #55-59, #63-66
2021	Luca Maresca	#42, #45
2022	Carlos Pacheco	#50
2022	Aaron Kuder	#50
2022	Juan Frigeri	#51-55
2022	Greg Land	#60
2022–2023	Ivan Fiorelli	#61-62

=== Vol. 9 (2023–present) ===
==== Writers ====
Years	Writer	Issues
2023-present	Jed MacKay	#1-present

==== Pencilers ====
Years	Penciler	Issues
2023-present	Carlos Villa	#1-4, #7-present
2023	Ivan Fiorelli	#5-6

== Cast ==
Volume 1

The below information for Volume 1 is based on the upper left corner of issues, which would show faces of avengers which allows us to have a general idea of the official roster.

Issues	Years	Team roster
#191-194	1980	Iron Man, Captain America, Scarlet Witch, Carol Danvers, Vision, Wasp, Beast, Falcon
#195-200	1980	Iron Man, Captain America, Scarlet Witch, Carol Danvers, Vision, Wasp, Wonder Man
#201-211	1980-1981	Beast, Wasp, Vision, Iron Man, Captain America, Wonder Man, Scarlet Witch
#212-216	1981-1982	Captain America, Wasp, Hank Pym, Thor, Iron Man, Tigra
#217-218	1982	Captain America, Wasp, Hank Pym, Thor, Iron Man
#219-220	1982	Captain America, Wasp, Iron Man, Thor
#221-231	1982-1983	Captain America, Wasp, Hawkeye, Iron Man, She-Hulk, Thor
#232	1983	Wasp, Thor, Captain America, She-Hulk, Monica Rambeau, Starfox, Hawkeye
#233-234	1983	Wasp, Thor, Captain America, She-Hulk, Monica Rambeau, Starfox
#235-239	1983-1984	Wasp, Scarlet Witch, Captain America, She-Hulk, Monica Rambeau, Starfox
#240-241	1984	Starfox, She-Hulk, Scarlet Witch, Wasp, Monica Rambeau
#242	1984	Captain America, She-Hulk, Wasp, Monica Rambeau, Thor, Starfox
#243-247	1984	Captain America, Vision, Wasp, Monica Rambeau, Scarlet Witch, Starfox
#248	1984	Starfox, Vision, Wasp, Monica Rambeau, Scarlet Witch
#249	1984	Thor, Vision, Wasp, Monica Rambeau, Scarlet Witch, Starfox
#250	1984	Vision, Scarlet Witch, Wasp, Monica Rambeau, Hercules, Starfox
#251	1985	Captain America, Vision, Hercules, Monica Rambeau, Scarlet Witch, Starfox
#252-253	1985	Captain America, Scarlet Witch, Starfox, Hercules, Vision
#254	1985	Captain America, Starfox, Black Knight, Wonder Man, Hercules, Scarlet Witch
#255-256	1985	Captain America, Hercules, Wasp, Black Knight, Starfox
#257-261	1985	Captain America, Starfox, Black Knight, Wasp, Hercules, Monica Rambeau
#262	1985	Captain America, Black Knight, Hercules, Wasp, Monica Rambeau
#263-277	1986-1987	Namor, Black Knight, Hercules, Wasp, Monica Rambeau, Captain America
#278	1987	Hercules, Monica Rambeau, Captain America, Black Knight, Wasp
#279	1987	Monica Rambeau, Captain America, Thor, Doctor Druid, She-Hulk, Black Knight
#280	1987	Namor, Black Knight, Hercules, Wasp, Thor, Captain America
#281	1987	Thor, Monica Rambeau, She-Hulk, Doctor Druid, Black Knight, Captain America
#282	1987	Monica Rambeau, Doctor Druid, Black Knight, Namor, Captain America, She-Hulk
#283-286	1987	Monica Rambeau, Namor, Black Knight, Thor, Captain America, She-Hulk
#287-293	1988	Monica Rambeau, Black Knight, She-Hulk, Doctor Druid, Namor
#294-298	1988	Thor, Black Knight, Doctor Druid, She-Hulk
#299	1989	Captain America, Mister Fantastic, Invisible Woman
#300-305	1989	Thor, Captain America, Mister Fantastic, Forgotten One, Invisible Woman
#306	1989	Thor, Captain America, Black Panther, Quasar, She-Hulk
#307	1989	Thor, Captain America, Quasar, Forgotten One, She-Hulk
#308-309	1989	Thor, Captain America, Namor, Forgotten One, She-Hulk
#310	1989	Thor, Captain America, Namor, Sersi, She-Hulk
#311	1989	Thor, Captain America, Sersi, Namor, Quasar, She-Hulk
#312	1989	Falcon, Wasp, Hank Pym, Vision, Scarlet Witch
#313	1990	Thor, Vision, Quasar, Captain America
#314	1990	Thor, Sersi, Captain America
#315	1990	Thor, Sersi, Captain America, Vision
#316-319	1990	Thor, Sersi, Iron Man, Captain America, Vision
#320-324	1990	Stingray, Sersi, Quasar, Captain America, Vision
#325-331	1990-1991	Thor, Sersi, Iron Man, Captain America, Vision
#332-334	1991	Thor, Sersi, Captain America, Vision
#335-342	1991	Thor, Sersi, Hercules, Captain America, Vision
#343	1992	Thunderstrike, Crystal, Captain America, Hercules, Black Knight
#344-350	1992	Thunderstrike, Vision, Black Knight, Hercules, Captain America, Crystal
#351-357	1992	Thunderstrike, Vision, Hercules, Black Knight, Crystal
#358	1993	Sersi, Vision, Hercules, Black Knight, Crystal

Volume	Characters
Vol. 8 (2018-23)	Black Panther (Note: From Avengers (vol. 8) #6 to #55); Black Widow (Note: From Avengers (vol. 8) #27 to #32); Blade (Note: From Avengers (vol. 8) #12); Captain Marvel; Captain America (Rogers); Doctor Strange (Note: From Avengers (vol. 8) #6 and after #8 as reserve member); Ghost Rider; Iron Man; Namor (Note: Avengers (vol. 8) #54); Nighthawk (Note: From Avengers (vol. 8) #55); Phoenix; She-Hulk (Note: From Avengers (vol. 8) #6 to #50); Starbrand; Thor; Valkyrie
Vol. 9 (2023-2026)	Black Panther; Captain Marvel; Captain America (Rogers) (Note: During Avengers (vol. 9) #14-16); Captain America (Wilson); Hazmat; Hawkeye (Kate); Hercules; Impossible City (Note: From Avengers (vol. 9) #6); Iron Man; Quicksilver; Scarlet Witch; Storm (Note: From Avengers (vol. 9) #17); Thor; Vision

== Collected editions ==
=== Avengers Vol. 1 ===
==== Omnibus ====
Volume	Main years covered	Material collected	Pages	Publication Date	ISBN
The Avengers Vol. 1	1963-1966	Avengers #1–30	744	February 15, 2012	978-0-7851-5846-2 978-0-7851-6015-1 (variant)
The Avengers Vol. 1	1963-1966	Avengers #1–30	776	July 18, 2023	978-1-302-95354-6
The Avengers Vol. 2	1966-1968	Avengers #31–58, Annual #1–2; X-Men #45; material from Not Brand Echh #5, 8	832	March 18, 2015	978-0-7851-9176-6 978-0-7851-9177-3 (variant)
The Avengers Vol. 2	1966-1968	Avengers #31–58, Annual #1–2; X-Men #45; material from Not Brand Echh #5, 8	848	July 25, 2023	978-1-302-95356-0
The Avengers Vol. 3	1968-1971	Avengers #59–88; Incredible Hulk (vol. 2) #140; Marvel Super-Heroes #17	760	March 21, 2018	978-1-302-91020-4 978-1-302-91021-1 (variant)
The Avengers Vol. 3	1968-1971	Avengers #59–88; Incredible Hulk (vol. 2) #140; Marvel Super-Heroes #17	768	August 29, 2023	978-1-302-95360-7
The Avengers Vol. 4	1971-1973	Avengers #89–119; Daredevil #99; Defenders #8–11	856	March 20, 2019	978-1-302-91534-6 978-1-302-91535-3 (variant)
The Avengers Vol. 4	1971-1973	Avengers #89–119; Daredevil #99; Defenders #8–11	856	September 19, 2023	978-1-302-95362-1
The Avengers Vol. 5	1973-1976	Avengers #120–149, Giant-Size Avengers #1–4, Captain Marvel #33, Fantastic Four #150; material from FOOM #6–7, 12	856	September 26, 2023	978-1-302-95411-6
Avengers: The Gathering	1991-1996	Avengers #343–344, 348–375, Annual #22; Avengers Strikefile; X-Men (1991) #26; Avengers West Coast #101; Uncanny X-Men #307; Black Knight: Exodus; Avengers Anniversary Magazine	1,152	March 17, 2021	978-1-302-92649-6 978-1-302-92650-2 (variant)
Avengers: The Crossing	1995-1996	Avengers #390–395; Avengers: The Crossing; Avengers: Timeslide; Iron Man #319–325; Force Works #16–22; War Machine #20–25; Age of Innocence: The Rebirth of Iron Man	792	May 9, 2012	978-0-7851-6203-2 978-0-7851-6204-9 (variant)

==== Marvel Masterworks ====
(hardcover only after Volume 6)

Volume	Material collected	Publication date	ISBN
Vol. 1	Avengers #1–10	May 13, 2009	978-0-7851-3706-1
Vol. 2	Avengers #11–20	October 14, 2009	978-0-7851-3708-5
Vol. 3	Avengers #21–30	April 6, 2011	978-0-7851-5056-5
Vol. 4	Avengers #31–40	April 11, 2012	978-0-7851-1638-7
Vol. 5	Avengers #41–50, Annual #1	July 9, 2013	978-0-7851-1848-0
Vol. 6	Avengers #51–58, Annual #2, X-Men (1963) #45	December 13, 2006	978-0-7851-2079-7
Vol. 7	Avengers #59–68, Marvel Super–Heroes (1966) #17	October 17, 2007	978-0-7851-2680-5
Vol. 8	Avengers #69–79	December 17, 2008	978-0-7851-2934-9
Vol. 9	Avengers #80–88, The Incredible Hulk #140	May 28, 2009	978-0-7851-3501-2
Vol. 10	Avengers #89–100	May 19, 2010	978-0-7851-3331-5
Vol. 11	Avengers #101–111, Daredevil (1964) #99	July 13, 2011	978-0-7851-5038-1
Vol. 12	Avengers #112–119, Defenders (1972) #8–11, and material from FOOM #5–7.	March 2012	978-0-7851-5879-0
Vol. 13	Avengers #120-128, Giant-Size Avengers #1, Captain Marvel #33 and Fantastic Four #150	June 19, 2013	978-0-7851-6629-0
Vol. 14	Avengers #129-135, Giant-Size Avengers #2-4, and material from FOOM #12	July 16, 2014	978-0-7851-8805-6
Vol. 15	Avengers #136-149	April 15, 2015	978-0-7851-9196-4
Vol. 16	Avengers #150-163, Annual #6, and Super-Villain Team-Up #9	June 2016	978-0-7851-9543-6
Vol. 17	Avengers #164-177, Annual #7, and Marvel Two-in-One Annual #2	August 2017	978-1-302-90341-1
Vol. 18	Avengers #178-188, Annual #8-9, Marvel Premiere #49 and material from Marvel Tales #100	April 2018	978-1-302-90960-4
Vol. 19	Avengers #189-202, Marvel Premiere #55 and Tales to Astonish (1979) #12	April 2019	978-1-302-91662-6
Vol. 20	Avengers #203-216, Annual #10 and material from Marvel Super-Action #35-37	June 2020	978-1-302-92224-5
Vol. 21	Avengers #217-226, Annual #11, The Vision and The Scarlet Witch #1-4 and material from Marvel Fanfare #3	August 2021	978-1-302-92935-0
Vol. 22	Avengers #227-235, Annual #12, The Amazing Spider-Man Annual #16, Doctor Strange #60, Fantastic Four #256 and part of #257.	May 2022	978-1-302-93328-9
Vol. 23	Avengers #236-245, Annual #13 and Hawkeye #1-4.	May 2023	978-1-302-94930-3
Vol. 24	Avengers #246-254, Avengers West Coast (1984) #1-4 and Iron Man Annual #7	July 2024	978-1-302-95532-8
Vol. 25	Avengers #255-263, Annual #14, Marvel Graphic Novel #27 & Fantastic Four #286	May 2025	

==== Epic Collections ====
Volume	Material collected	Publication date	ISBN
Vol. 1: Earth's Mightiest Heroes	Avengers #1-20	December 2, 2014 May 28, 2024	978-0-7851-8864-3 978-1-302-95798-8
Vol. 2: Once an Avenger	Avengers #21-40	November 29, 2016	978-0-7851-9582-5
Vol. 3: Masters of Evil	Avengers #41–56, Annual #1-2, X-Men #45, material From Not Brand Echh #5 & #8	May 9, 2017	978-1-302-90410-4
Vol. 4: Behold...the Vision	Avengers #57-76, Marvel Super-Heroes #17	May 12, 2015	978-0-7851-9165-0
Vol. 5: This Beachhead Earth	Avengers #77–97; Incredible Hulk (vol. 2) #140	July 29, 2020 August 22, 2023	978-1-302-92197-2 978-1-302-95052-1
Vol. 6: A Traitor Stalks Among Us	Avengers #98–114; Daredevil #99	June 1, 2021	978-1-302-92911-4
Vol. 7: The Avengers/Defenders War	Avengers #115–128; Giant-Size Avengers #1; Defenders #9–11; Captain Marvel #33; Fantastic Four #150; and material from Defenders #8	April 11, 2018 April 12, 2022	978-1-302-91000-6 978-1-302-93402-6
Vol. 8: Kang War	Avengers #129-149, Giant-Size Avengers #2-4	July 19, 2022	978-1-302-93352-4
Vol. 9: The Final Threat	Avengers #150-166, Annual #6-7, Super-Villain Team-Up #9 & Marvel Two-in-One Annual #2	December 11, 2013 May 26, 2021	978-0-7851-8790-5 978-1-302-92959-6
Vol. 10: The Yesterday Quest	Avengers #167–188, Annual #8–9; and material from Marvel Tales #100	September 26, 2023	978-1-302-94876-4
Vol. 11: The Evil Reborn	Avengers #189–209, Annual #10; Marvel Premiere #55; and material from Tales to Astonish #12	May 21, 2024	978-1-302-95523-6
Vol. 12: Court Martial	Avengers #210-226, Annual #11, and Vision and the Scarlet Witch (1982) #1-4	May 6, 2025	978-1-302-96050-6
Vol. 13: Seasons of the Witch	Avengers #227-237, Annual #12; Amazing Spider-Man Annual #16; Fantastic Four #256; Doctor Strange #60; Hawkeye #1-4	November 12, 2024	978-1-302-96009-4
Vol. 16: Under Siege	Avengers #264-277, Annual #15, Alpha Flight #39 & West Coast Avengers Annual #1	May 31, 2016	978-0-7851-9539-9
Vol. 17: Judgment Day	Avengers #278–285, Annual #16; Marvel Graphic Novel No. 27 - Emperor Doom; X-Men vs. Avengers #1–4; West Coast Avengers Annual #2	June 18, 2014 January 4, 2022	978-0-7851-8894-0 978-1-302-93366-1
Vol. 18: Heavy Metal	Avengers #286-303, Annual #17	November 24, 2020	978-1-302-92315-0
Vol. 19: Acts of Vengeance	Avengers #304-318, Annual #18, Avengers West Coast #53-55	March 28, 2023	978-1-302-95110-8
Vol. 20: The Crossing Line	Avengers #319-333, Annual #19 and material from Captain America Annual #9, Iron Man Annual #11, Thor Annual #15 and Avengers West Coast Annual #5	March 1, 2022	978-1-302-93444-6
Vol. 21: The Collection Obsession	Avengers #334–344, Annual #20, Marvel Graphic Novel No. 68 - Avengers: Death Trap – The Vault and material from Incredible Hulk Annual #17, Namor the Sub-Mariner Annual #1, Iron Man Annual #12 and Avengers West Coast Annual #6	March 14, 2018 September 20, 2022	978-1-302-91001-3
Vol. 22: Operation: Galactic Storm	Avengers #345–347, Avengers West Coast #80–82, Quasar #32–34, Wonder Man #7–9, Iron Man #278–279, Thor #445–446, Captain America #401 and material from Captain America #398–400	July 26, 2017 May 10, 2022	978-1-302-90689-4 978-1-302-94686-9
Vol. 23: Fear the Reaper	Avengers #348–359, Annual #21 and material from Captain America Annual #11, Thor Annual #17 and Fantastic Four Annual #25	April 10, 2019	978-1-302-91616-9
Vol. 24: The Gatherers Strike!	Avengers #360–366, Annual #22; Avengers: Strikefile; Avengers Anniversary Magazine; Avengers: The Terminatrix Objective #1–4	December 11, 2019	978-1-302-92063-0
Vol. 25: The Gathering	Avengers #367-377, Annual #23; X-Men #26; Avengers West Coast #101; Uncanny X-Men #307; Avengers Log	August 22, 2023	978-1-302-95367-6
Vol. 26: Taking A.I.M.	Avengers #378–388; Marvel Double Feature: Avengers/Giant-Man #379-382; Vision #1-4; Captain America #440–441	November 9, 2021	978-1-302-93233-6

==== Other Collections ====
Title (Trade Paperback/ Hardcover)	Material collected	Publication date	ISBN
The Avengers: The Kree/Skrull War	Avengers #89–97	May 7, 2008	978-0-7851-3230-1
Avengers/Defenders War	Avengers #115–118, Defenders #8–11	March 2002	978-0-7851-0844-3
The Avengers: Celestial Madonna (TPB)	Avengers #129–135, Giant Sized Avengers #2–4	May 1, 2002	978-0-7851-0826-9
The Avengers: The Coming of the Beast (Hardcover)	Avengers #137–140, 145–146	January 26, 2011	978-0-7851-4468-7
The Avengers: The Serpent Crown (TPB)	Avengers #141–144 and #147–149	September 7, 2005	978-0-7851-1700-1
The Avengers: The Big Three	Captain America (1968) #176; Avengers #150-151, #215-216, #224; Avengers: The Terminatrix Objective #1-4; Avengers (1998) #21; Thor (1998) #81	March 14, 2012	978-0-7851-5938-4
The Avengers: The Private War of Doctor Doom (Hardcover)	Avengers #150–156, Avengers Annual #6, and Super Villain Team-Up #9	March 2012	978-0-7851-6235-3
The Avengers: The Bride of Ultron (Hardcover)	Avengers #157-166	October 2012	978-0-7851-6251-3
The Avengers: The Korvac Saga (Hardcover)	Avengers #167–168 and #170–177	June 2003	978-0-7851-0919-8
The Avengers: The Korvac Saga (TPB)	Avengers #167–168, #170–177 and Thor Annual #6	March 2012	978-0-7851-6205-6
The Avengers: Nights of Wundagore (TPB)	Avengers #181–187	March 27, 2009	978-0-7851-3721-4
The Avengers: Heart of Stone (TPB)	Avengers #188–196, Avengers Annual #9	May 14, 2013	978-0-7851-8431-7
The Avengers: The Trial of Yellowjacket (TPB)	Avengers #212-230	August 15, 2012	978-0-7851-6207-0
The Avengers: Absolute Vision Book 1 (TPB)	Avengers #231-241, Avengers Annual #11-12, The Amazing Spider-Man Annual #16, Fantastic Four #256, and Doctor Strange vol. 2 #60	December 10, 2013	978-0-7851-8534-5
The Avengers: Absolute Vision Book 2 (TPB)	Avengers #242-254, Avengers Annual #13	March 25, 2014	978-0-7851-8535-2
The Avengers: The Legacy of Thanos (TPB)	Avengers #255-261, Avengers Annual #14, Fantastic Four Annual #19	June 24, 2014	978-0-7851-8891-9
The Avengers: West Coast Avengers Assemble (Hardcover)	West Coast Avengers #1–4, Iron Man Annual #7, and Avengers #250, plus material from Avengers #239, #243–244, and #246, and Avengers West Coast #100.	June 9, 2010	978-0-7851-4321-5
Secret Wars II Omnibus (Hardcover)	Secret Wars II #1–9, Avengers #260–261, #265–266, plus more.	February 18, 2009	978-0-7851-3721-4
Avengers: The Once and Future Kang (TPB)	Avengers #262–269, Avengers Annual #15, West Coast Avengers Annual #1	February 19, 2013	978-0-7851-6729-7
The Avengers: Under Siege (Hardcover)	Avengers #270–277	December 22, 2010	978-0-7851-4382-6
The Avengers: Assault on Olympus (Hardcover)	Avengers #278–285	September 21, 2011	978-0-7851-5533-1
The Avengers: Heavy Metal (TPB)	Avengers #286–293	August 6, 2013	978-0-7851-8452-2
X-Men: Inferno Crossovers Omnibus (Hardcover)	Avengers #298–300 plus more.	September 8, 2010	978-0-7851-4671-1
Acts of Vengeance Omnibus (Hardcover)	Avengers #311–313, Annual #19, Avengers Spotlight #26–29, Avengers West Coast #53–55, plus more.	March 30, 2011	978-0-7851-6127-1
Avengers: Galactic Storm: Volume 1 (TPB)	Collects Avengers #345–346, Avengers West Coast #80–81, Captain America #398–399, Quasar #32–33, Wonder Man #7–8, Iron Man #278 and Thor #445.	March 2006	978-0-7851-2044-5
Avengers: Galactic Storm: Volume 2 (TPB)	Collects Avengers #347, Avengers West Coast #82, Iron Man #279, Thor #446, Captain America #400–401, Quasar #34–35, Wonder Man #9 and What If? #55–56.	December 2006	978-0-7851-2045-2
Avengers: Live Kree or Die!	Avengers #365, #378-379, Iron Man v3 #7, Captain America v3 #8, Quicksilver #10, Avengers v3 #7, material from Avengers #364, #366	August 11, 2020	978-1-302-92318-1
The Avengers/ X-Men: Bloodties (Hardcover)	Avengers #368–369, Avengers West Coast #101, Uncanny X-Men #307, X-Men #26, Black Knight: Exodus	January 18, 2012	978-1-302-91616-9
Avengers/ Iron Man: First Sign (TPB)	Avengers #396-400, Iron Man #326-331, Thor #426, Captain America #449.	August 2013	978-0-7851-8496-6
X-Men: The Complete Onslaught Epic, Book 1 (TPB)	Avengers #400–401, X-Men #53–54, Uncanny X-Men #334–335, and more.	December 20, 2007	978-0-7851-2823-6
X-Men: The Complete Onslaught Epic, Book 3 (TPB)	Avengers #402, Iron Man #332, and more.	August 27, 2008	978-0-7851-2825-0
Marvel Platinum: the Definitive Avengers (TPB)	Avengers #1, 4, 57, 93, Avengers West Coast #51-52, Avengers #10-11, Avengers #503, Avengers Finale and New Avengers #3.	12 April 2012	978-1-84653-507-9
Title (B&W Trade Paperbacks)	Material collected	Publication date	ISBN
Essential Avengers, Vol. 1 (Marvel Essentials)	Avengers #1–24 (B&W) (1963–1966)	November 18, 1998	978-0-7851-1862-6
Essential Avengers, Vol. 2 (Marvel Essentials)	Avengers #25–46, Annual #1 (B&W) (1966–1967)	June 1, 2000	978-0-7851-0741-5
Essential Avengers, Vol. 3 (Marvel Essentials)	Avengers #47–68, Annual #2 (B&W) (1967–1969)	March 1, 2001	978-0-7851-0787-3
Essential Avengers, Vol. 4 (Marvel Essentials)	Avengers #69–97, The Incredible Hulk #140 (B&W) (1969–1972)	October 1, 2004	978-0-7851-1485-7
Essential Avengers, Vol. 5 (Marvel Essentials)	Avengers #98–119, Daredevil #99, Defenders #8–11 (B&W) (1972–1974)	January 25, 2006	978-0-7851-2087-2
Essential Avengers, Vol. 6 (Marvel Essentials)	Avengers #120–140, Captain Marvel #33, Fantastic Four #150, Giant–Size Avengers #1–4 (B&W) (1974–1975)	February 20, 2008	978-0-7851-3058-1
Essential Avengers, Vol. 7 (Marvel Essentials)	Avengers #141–163, Annual #6, and Super-Villain Team-Up #9 (B&W) (1975–1977)	January 8, 2010	978-0-7851-4453-3
Essential Avengers, Vol. 8 (Marvel Essentials)	Avengers #164–184, Annual #7-8, and Marvel Two-in-One Annual #2 (B&W) (1977–1979)	April 25, 2012	978-0-7851-6322-0
Essential Avengers, Vol. 9 (Marvel Essentials)	Avengers #185-206, Avengers Annual #9, Tales to Astonish #12 (B&W) (1979–1981)	September 24, 2013	978-0-7851-8411-9

=== Avengers Vol. 2 ===
Title (Trade Paperback)	Material collected	Publication date	ISBN
Heroes Reborn: Avengers	Avengers (1996) #1–12	December 27, 2006	978-0-7851-2337-8

=== Avengers Vol. 3 ===
==== Omnibus ====
Volume	Main years covered	Material collected	Pages	Publication Date	ISBN
Avengers by Kurt Busiek and George Pérez Vol. 1	1997-1999	Avengers (vol. 3) #1–23, 0, Rough Cut, Annual '99; Iron Man (vol. 3) #7; Captain America (vol. 3) #8; Quicksilver #10; Avengers/Squadron Supreme Annual 1998; Avengers Forever #1–12	1,184	March 18, 2015	978-0-7851-9288-6
Avengers by Kurt Busiek and George Pérez Vol. 1	1997-1999	Avengers (vol. 3) #1–23, 0, Rough Cut, Annual '99; Iron Man (vol. 3) #7; Captain America (vol. 3) #8; Quicksilver #10; Avengers/Squadron Supreme Annual 1998; Avengers Forever #1–12	1,184	January 3, 2023	978-1-302-94545-9
Avengers by Kurt Busiek and George Pérez Vol. 2	1999-2002	Avengers (vol. 3) #24–56, 1½, Annual 2000, Annual 2001; Thunderbolts #42–44; Avengers: The Ultron Imperative; Maximum Security #1–3; Maximum Security: Dangerous Planet	1,248	November 3, 2015	978-0-7851-9807-9
Avengers by Kurt Busiek and George Pérez Vol. 2	1999-2002	Avengers (vol. 3) #24–56, 1½, Annual 2000, Annual 2001; Thunderbolts #42–44; Avengers: The Ultron Imperative; Maximum Security #1–3; Maximum Security: Dangerous Planet	1,248	September 10, 2024	978-1-302-95901-2

==== Complete Collections ====
NB: The Avengers Assemble volumes comprise most of the Busiek and Pérez run.

Volume	Material collected	Publication date	ISBN
Avengers Assemble, Vol. 1	Avengers vol. 3 #1–11, Annual 1998; Iron Man vol. 3 #7; Captain America vol. 3 #8; Quicksilver #10	January 12, 2011	978-0-7851-4498-4
Avengers Assemble, Vol. 2	Avengers vol. 3 #12–23 and #0, Annual 1999; Avengers: Rough Cut.	March 2012	978-0-7851-6126-4
Avengers Assemble, Vol. 3	Avengers vol. 3 #23–34, #1½, Annual 2000; Thunderbolts #42–44	July 26, 2006	978-0-7851-2130-5
Avengers Assemble, Vol. 4	Avengers vol. 3 #35–44, Avengers: The Ultron Imperative, "Maximum Security #1-3" and "Maximum Security: Dangerous Planet"	January 31, 2007	978-0-7851-2347-7
Avengers Assemble, Vol. 5	Avengers vol. 3 #45–56, Annual 2001	November 7, 2007	978-0-7851-2348-4
Avengers: The Complete Collection by Geoff Johns, vol. 1	Avengers vol. 3 #57-63, Vision #1-4, Thor vol. 2 #58, Iron Man vol. 3 #64	2013	978-0-7851-8433-1
Avengers: The Complete Collection by Geoff Johns, vol. 2	Avengers vol. 3 #64-76	2013	978-0-7851-8439-3

==== Hardcovers ====
NB: The Avengers Assemble volumes and Avengers: Disassembled are oversized.

Volume	Material collected	Publication date	ISBN
Avengers Assemble, Vol. 1	Avengers vol. 3 #1–11, Annual 1998; Iron Man vol. 3 #7; Captain America vol. 3 #8; Quicksilver #10	August 4, 2004	978-0-7851-1573-1
Avengers Assemble, Vol. 2	Avengers vol. 3 #12–22, #0 and Annual 1999	April 6, 2005	978-0-7851-1773-5
Avengers Assemble, Vol. 3	Avengers vol. 3 #23–34, #1½, Thunderbolts #42–44	July 26, 2006	978-0-7851-2130-5
Avengers Assemble, Vol. 4	Avengers vol. 3 #35–40, Annual 2000, Avengers: The Ultron Imperative, Maximum Security #1-3" and "Maximum Security: Dangerous Planet"	January 31, 2007	978-0-7851-2347-7
Avengers Assemble, Vol. 5	Avengers vol. 3 #41–56, Annual 2001	November 7, 2007	978-0-7851-2348-4
Avengers, Vol. 1: World Trust	Avengers vol. 3 #57–61	February 10, 2010	978-0-7851-4473-1
Avengers, Vol. 2: Standoff	Avengers vol. 3 #62–64, Thor vol. 2 #58, and Iron Man vol. 3 #64.	February 10, 2010	978-0-7851-4467-0
Avengers, Vol. 3: Red Zone	Avengers vol. 3 #65–70	May 26, 2010	978-0-7851-4466-3
Avengers, Vol. 4: The Search for She-Hulk	Avengers vol. 3 #71–76	August 4, 2010	978-0-7851-4472-4
Avengers: Disassembled	Avengers #500–503 (returns to original numbering); Avengers Finale	December 20, 2006	978-0-7851-2294-4

==== Trade Paperbacks ====
Volume	Material collected	Publication date	ISBN
Avengers: The Morgan Conquest	Avengers vol. 3 #1–4	January 2000	978-0-7851-0728-6
Avengers: Supreme Justice	Avengers vol. 3 #5-7, Avengers/Squadron Supreme Annual '98, Iron Man vol. 3 #7, Captain America vol. 3 #8, and Quicksilver #10	June 1, 2001	978-0-7851-0773-6
Avengers: Clear and Present Dangers	Avengers vol. 3 #8–15	November 1, 2001	978-0-7851-0798-9
Avengers: Ultron Unlimited	Avengers vol. 3 #0 and #19–22	April 1, 2001	978-0-7851-0774-3
Avengers: Living Legends	Avengers vol. 3 #23–30	July 21, 2004	978-0-7851-1561-8
Avengers/Thunderbolts: The Nefaria Protocols	Avengers vol. 3 #31–34, Thunderbolts #42–44	March 1, 2004	978-0-7851-1445-1
Avengers/X-Men: Maximum Security	Maximum Security: Dangerous Planet #1-3, Captain America vol. 3 #36, Thor vol. 2 #30, Uncanny X-Men #387, Bishop: The Last X-Man #15, Iron Man vol. 3 #35, Avengers vol. 3 #35, Gambit vol. 3 #23, X-Men vol. 2 #107, and X-Men Unlimited #29	2010	978-0-7851-4499-1
Avengers: Above and Beyond	Avengers vol. 3 #36–40, 56, Avengers: Ultron Imperative, and Annual 2001	February 15, 2006	978-0-7851-1845-9
Avengers: The Kang Dynasty	Avengers vol. 3 #41–55 (vol. 1 #456–470), (Note: From issue #41, all issues share legacy numbering for both volumes 1 and 3 on covers) and Annual 2001	November 30, 2002	978-0-7851-0958-7
Avengers, Vol. 1: World Trust	Avengers vol. 3 #57–62 (vol. 1 #472–477), and Marvel Double–Shot #2	March 17, 2003	978-0-7851-1080-4
Avengers, Vol. 2: Red Zone	Avengers vol. 3 #64–70 (vol. 1 #478–485)	December 30, 2003	978-0-7851-1099-6
Avengers, Vol. 3: The Search for She-Hulk	Avengers vol. 3 #71–76 (vol. 1 #486–491)	May 2004	978-0-7851-1202-0
Avengers, Vol. 4: Lionheart of Avalon	Avengers vol. 3 #77–81 (vol. 1 #492–496)	August 1, 2004	978-0-7851-1338-6
Avengers, Vol. 5: Once An Invader	Avengers vol. 3 #82–84 (vol. 1 #497–499), Invaders #0	November 1, 2004	978-0-7851-1481-9
Avengers: Disassembled	Avengers #500–503, (Note: Series returns to original numbering) and Avengers Finale	November 22, 2006	978-0-7851-1482-6

=== Avengers Vol. 4 ===
Title (Hardcover)	Material collected	Publication date	ISBN
Avengers Vol. 1	Avengers vol. 4 #1–6	February 9, 2011	978-0-7851-4500-4
Avengers Vol. 2	Avengers vol. 4 #7–12, #12.1	July 27, 2011	978-0-7851-4504-2
Avengers: Fear Itself	Avengers vol. 4 #13–17; New Avengers vol. 2 #14–16	January 25, 2012	978-0-7851-6348-0
Avengers Vol. 3	Avengers vol. 4 #18–24, #24.1	July 25, 2012	978-0-7851-5116-6
Avengers Vol. 4	Avengers (2010) #25-30	January 1, 2013	978-0-7851-6079-3
Avengers Vol. 5	Avengers vol. 4 #31-34, Annual #1; New Avengers vol. 2 Annual #1	March 5, 2013	978-0-7851-6081-6
Title (Trade Paperback)	Material collected	Publication date	ISBN
Avengers, Vol. 1	Avengers (2010) #1–6	August 10, 2011	978-0-7851-4501-1

=== Avengers Vol. 5 ===
Avengers Vol. 5, entirely written by Jonathan Hickman, is best read in tandem with his concurrent New Avengers Vol. 3. As such, given below are the collected editions for both his Avengers and New Avengers series.

==== Omnibus ====
Volume	Material collected	Page count	Publication date	ISBN
Avengers by Jonathan Hickman: Omnibus Vol. 1	Avengers (vol. 5) #1–23; New Avengers (vol. 3) #1–12; Infinity #1–6; Infinity: Against the Tide; Infinite Comic #1–2; material from Astonishing Tales (vol. 2) #1–6 and Shang-Chi: Master of Kung Fu (vol. 2) #1	1,192	July 5, 2017	978-1-302-90708-2
Avengers by Jonathan Hickman: Omnibus Vol. 1	Avengers (vol. 5) #1–23; New Avengers (vol. 3) #1–12; Infinity #1–6; Infinity: Against the Tide; Infinite Comic #1–2; material from Astonishing Tales (vol. 2) #1–6 and Shang-Chi: Master of Kung Fu (vol. 2) #1	1,192	February 7, 2023	978-1-302-94547-3
Avengers by Jonathan Hickman: Omnibus Vol. 2	Avengers (vol. 5) #24–44; New Avengers (vol. 3) #13–33	1,088	July 4, 2018	978-1-302-91181-2
Avengers by Jonathan Hickman: Omnibus Vol. 2	Avengers (vol. 5) #24–44; New Avengers (vol. 3) #13–33	1,088	May 9, 2023	978-1-302-94549-7

==== Oversized Hardcovers ====
Volume	Material collected	Page count	Publication date	ISBN
Avengers Vol. 1	Avengers vol. 5 #1–13	328	2015	978-0-7851-9109-4
Avengers Vol. 2	Avengers vol. 5 #14-23	272	September 2015	978-0-7851-9708-9
Avengers Vol. 3	Avengers vol. 5 #24-34	288	February 2016	978-0-7851-9806-2
Infinity	Infinity (2013) #1-6, Avengers vol. 5 #14-23, New Avengers vol. 3 #7-12, Infinity: Against the Tide - Infinite Comic #1-2	632	2014	978-0-7851-8422-5
New Avengers Vol. 1	New Avengers vol. 3 #1-12	304	April 2015	978-0-7851-9396-8
New Avengers Vol. 2	New Avengers vol. 3 #13.INH-23	280	November 2015	978-0-7851-9709-6
Avengers: Time Runs Out	Avengers vol. 5 #35-44, New Avengers vol. 3 #24-33	520	2016	978-0-7851-9809-3

==== Complete Collections ====
Volume	Material collected	Publication date	ISBN
Avengers by Jonathan Hickman: The Complete Collection Vol. 1	New Avengers (vol. 3) #1-6 and Avengers (vol. 5) #1-5, Astonishing Tales: Mojoworld #1-6	September 2020	978-1-302-92509-3
Avengers by Jonathan Hickman: The Complete Collection Vol. 2	New Avengers (vol. 3) #7 and Avengers (vol. 5) #6-17 and material from Shang-Chi: Master of Kung Fu #1	December 2020	978-1-302-92530-7
Avengers by Jonathan Hickman: The Complete Collection Vol. 3	New Avengers (vol. 3) #8-12 and Avengers (vol. 5) #18-23, Infinity #1-6,	February 2021	978-1-302-92647-2
Avengers by Jonathan Hickman: The Complete Collection Vol. 4	New Avengers (vol. 3) #13-23 and Avengers (vol. 5) #24-34	April 2021	978-1-302-92648-9
Avengers by Jonathan Hickman: The Complete Collection Vol. 5	New Avengers (vol. 3) #24-33 and Avengers (vol. 5) #35-44	July 2022	978-1-302-93351-7

==== Trade Paperbacks and Standard-Size Hardcovers ====
All volumes listed here were available as trade paperbacks and standard-size hardcovers with the exception of Infinity, which was released only as a paperback and as an oversized hardcover.

Volume	Material collected	Publication date	ISBN
Avengers Vol. 1: Avengers World	Avengers vol. 5 #1–6	April 30, 2013	978-0-7851-6823-2
Avengers Vol. 2: The Last White Event	Avengers vol. 5 #7-11	July 23, 2013	978-0-7851-6824-9
Avengers Vol. 3: Prelude to Infinity	Avengers vol. 5 #12-17	October 29, 2013	978-0-7851-6825-6
Avengers Vol. 4: Infinity	Avengers vol. 5 #18-23	January 28, 2014	978-0-7851-8414-0
Avengers Vol. 5: Adapt or Die	Avengers vol. 5 #24-28	July 15, 2014	978-0-7851-5477-8
Avengers Vol. 6: Infinite Avengers	Avengers vol. 5 #29-34	November 18, 2014	978-0-7851-5478-5
Infinity	Infinity (2013) #1-6, Avengers vol. 5 #14-23, New Avengers vol. 3 #7-12	September 2, 2014	978-0-7851-8423-2
New Avengers Vol. 1: Everything Dies	New Avengers vol. 3 #1-6	July 16, 2013	978-0-7851-6836-2
New Avengers Vol. 2: Infinity	New Avengers vol. 3 #7-12	January 14, 2014	978-0-7851-6837-9
New Avengers Vol. 3: Other Worlds	New Avengers vol. 3 #13-17	July 1, 2014	978-0-7851-5484-6
New Avengers Vol. 4: A Perfect World	New Avengers vol. 3 #18-23	November 18, 2014	978-0-7851-5485-3
Time Runs Out, vol. 1	Avengers vol. 5 #35-37; New Avengers vol. 3 #24-25	January 14, 2015	978-0-7851-9341-8
Time Runs Out, vol. 2	Avengers vol. 5 #38-39; New Avengers vol. 3 #26-28	March 10, 2015	978-0-7851-9372-2
Time Runs Out, vol. 3	Avengers vol. 5 #40-42; New Avengers vol. 3 #29-30	May 26, 2015	978-0-7851-9222-0
Time Runs Out, vol. 4	Avengers vol. 5 #43-44; New Avengers vol. 3 #31-33	June 30, 2015	978-0-7851-9224-4

=== Avengers Vol. 6: All-New, All-Different Avengers ===
#	Title	Material collected	Publication date	ISBN
1	The Magnificent Seven	All-New, All-Different Avengers #1–6; Avengers #0 (All-New, All-Different story); Free Comic Book Day 2015 (A story)	May 11, 2016	978-0-7851-9967-0
2	Family Business	All-New, All-Different Avengers #7–12	October 18, 2016	978-0-7851-9968-7
3	Civil War II	All-New, All-Different Avengers #13–15; All-New, All-Different Avengers Annual #1	February 21, 2017	978-1-302-90236-0

=== Avengers Vol. 7: Avengers Unleashed ===
#	Title	Material collected	Publication date	ISBN
1	Kang War One	Avengers vol. 6 #1–6	July 3, 2017	978-1-302-90611-5
2	Secret Empire	Avengers vol. 6 #7–11	November 28, 2017	978-1-302-90612-2

=== Avengers Vol. 8 ===
#	Title	Material collected	Pages	Publication date	ISBN
1	The Final Host	Avengers vol. 8 #1–6, material from Free Comic Book Day 2018 (Avengers / Captain America) #1 (Avengers story)	160	October 16, 2018	978-1-302-91187-4
2	World Tour	Avengers vol. 8 #7-12	160	March 19, 2019	978-1-302-91188-1
3	War of the Vampires	Avengers vol. 8 #13-17	136	June 18, 2019	978-1-302-91461-5
4	War of the Realms	Avengers vol. 8 #18-21, material from Free Comic Book Day 2019 #1(Avengers story)	112	December 10, 2019	978-1-302-91462-2
5	Challenge of the Ghost Riders	Avengers vol. 8 #22-25, All-New Ghost Rider (2014) #1	112	February 12, 2020	978-1-302-92093-7
6	Starbrand Reborn	Avengers vol. 8 #26-30	112	August 4, 2020	978-1-302-92094-4
7	The Age of Khonshu	Avengers vol. 8 #31-38	184	January 19, 2021	978-1-302-92486-7
8	Enter The Phoenix	Avengers vol. 8 #39-45	168	May 25, 2021	978-1-302-92487-4
9	World War She-Hulk	Avengers vol. 8 #46-50	184	January 4, 2022	978-1-302-92488-1
10	The Death Hunters	Avengers vol. 8 #51–56, Avengers 1,000,000 B.C. and material from Free Comic Book Day 2021: The Avengers/Hulk #1 (Avengers story)	176	September 27, 2022	978-1-302-92628-1
11	History's Mightiest Heroes	Avengers vol. 8 #57–62	136	February 7, 2023	978-1-302-92885-8
	Avengers Assemble	Avengers Assemble Alpha #1, Avengers vol. 8 # 63-66, Avengers Forever vol. 2 #12-15, Avengers Assemble Omega #1	288	July 18, 2023	978-1-302-95063-7

=== Avengers Vol. 9 ===
#	Title	Material collected	Pages	Publication date	ISBN
1	The Impossible City	Avengers vol. 9 #1–6, material from Timeless (2022) #1	184	January 9, 2024	978-1-302-94769-9
2	Twilight Dreaming	Avengers vol. 9 #7-11	112	July 2, 2024	978-1-302-94770-5
3	Blood Hunt	Avengers vol. 9 #12-16	112	December 3, 2024	978-1-302-95846-6
4	Storm	Avengers vol. 9 #17-23	160	May 6, 2025	978-1-302-96076-6
