= Batman: Creature of the Night =

2017–19 comic book miniseries

- Cover to Batman: Creature of the Night #1 (November 2017)

Publication information
- Publisher: DC Comics
- Publication date: November 2017 – November 2019

Creative team
- Written by: Kurt Busiek
- Penciller(s): John Paul Leon
- Inker(s): John Paul Leon
- Letterer(s): Todd Klein
- Colorist(s): John Paul Leon
- Editor(s): Chris Conroy; Joey Cavalieri

Batman: Creature of the Night is a four-issue comic book miniseries first published by DC Comics in November 2017. It was written by Kurt Busiek, with art by John Paul Leon. The series is a spiritual companion to Busiek's 2004 miniseries Superman: Secret Identity.

Set in a world where Batman exists as a comic book, the story focuses on a young fan, Bruce Wainwright, who grows up in Boston and whose life story ends up mirroring Bruce Wayne's in several ways, leading to a bat-like creature manifesting as Wainwright's guardian, whom the boy uses to get justice.

== Publication ==
In January 2018, Leon was diagnosed with the disease colorectal cancer a third time, which had again spread to his lungs. He underwent chemotherapy again in January 2019, and indicated in an interview that November that he was responding well to the treatment, and was exhibiting promising energy levels. Though he continued to work throughout this process, it hindered the timely release of Batman: Creature of the Night.

== Story ==
=== Book One: I Shall Become... ===
Starting in the late 60s, Bruce Wainwright is a boy growing up in Boston with moderately well-off parents and a strong obsession with Batman comics. However, one Halloween night, a botched robbery leads to his parents being murdered, and Wainwright's world sent spiraling out of control.

=== Book Two: Boy Wonder ===
Now a young adult, Wainwright has become a successful businessman, while waging a war on Boston's crime with the aide of his supernatural guardian.

=== Book Three: Crusader ===
Realizing his dark protector has a harmful side, Wainwright tries to find a way to control it as he wrestles with whether or not he has changed Boston for the better at all.

=== Book Four: Dark Knight ===
Now one with the bat creature, Wainwright is a lost man, stuck in denial and looking for answers for a supposed conspiracy that is behind all that's wrong in Boston, and his own life.
