= Maximum Security (comics) =

Marvel Comics crossover event

- Cover of Maximum Security 1 (Dec, 2000), art by Jerry Ordway
- Publisher: Marvel Comics
- Publication date: December 2000 – January 2001
- Genre: Superhero; Crossover
Title(s)
The Amazing Spider-Man vol. 2 #24
Avengers vol. 3 #35
Avengers Infinity #1-4
Bishop:The Last X-Man #15
Black Panther vol. 3 #25
Captain America vol. 3 #36
Captain Marvel vol. 3 #12
Gambit vol. 3 #23
The Incredible Hulk vol. 3 #21
Iron Man vol. 3 #34-35
Marvel Knights vol. 1 #6
Maximum Security #1-3
Maximum Security: Dangerous Planet #1
Maximum Security: Thor vs. Ego #1
Peter Parker: Spider-Man #24
Thor vol. 2 #30
Thunderbolts vol. 1 #45
Uncanny X-Men #387
X-Men vol. 2 #107
X-Men Unlimited #29

Creative team
- Writer: Kurt Busiek
- Penciller: Jerry Ordway
- Letterer(s): Jason Levine; Troy Peteri; Albert Deschesne
- Colorist(s): Tom Smith; Jason Wright

"Maximum Security" is a comic book story line and crossover event that ran through a three-issue self-titled limited series and individual issues of the other titles published by Marvel Comics with a cover date of either December 2000 or January 2001. In it, a multitude of alien civilizations that had previously interacted with Earth join forces to prevent humans from interfering further with galactic affairs. To accomplish this, they designate Earth as a penal colony.

The miniseries and its crossover in the pages of Avengers were written by Kurt Busiek.

Marvel collected much the story arc in trade paperback on November 24, 2010.

== Publication history ==
In December 2000, Marvel Comics published Maximum Security: Dangerous Planet, which recapped relevant events and set up the crossover's main plot. All three issues of Maximum Security were published in January 2001. Most other comics from the publisher that month tied into the event, if only marginally. Another tie-in comic, Maximum Security: Thor vs. Ego #1, reprinted earlier stories from Thor.

While not carrying the "Maximum Security" banner, plotlines from the earlier miniseries Avengers Forever (1999) and Avengers Infinity (2000) were concluded in Maximum Security.

Writer Kurt Busiek stated that he wrote the story out of "self-defense", having been told that Marvel was looking for a big crossover story and that he either had to come up with one or he'd be participating in someone else's.

His original synopsis was for a story called "Y2KANG" in which when the clock ticked over at midnight of New Year's Eve 1999, it became 1900 again and all the Marvel characters would be turn-of-the-century versions of themselves. However, by the time Marvel stated this was the story they wanted to do, it couldn't be solicited until April 2000 and wouldn't have made any sense.

Busiek's second suggestion was "Maximum Security", the concept of which was influenced by Australian history and how the British used Australia as a place to dump convicts, too far away from Britain for them to escape and return. Busiek thought it would be fun if the galactic powers that be viewed Earth the same way, dumping their criminals here and not caring about what happened to the natives.

Busiek needed someone to play the 'alien cop' and chose U.S. Agent, saying that he hadn't been used much lately and was inspired by the character. He was influenced by Tommy Lee Jones' character from the movie The Fugitive because he was "a tough, no nonsense Federal Agent who didn't care about your sob stories, just that if you broke the law you were going to jail", considering the character's personality to be "very USAgent-y".

== Plot ==
Thor, Tigra, Starfox, Quasar, Moondragon, Photon and Jack of Hearts become the temporary Avengers Infinity squad when they travel into space and encounter a group of cosmic entities called the Infinites. The Infinites have plans to rearrange galaxies (destroying all life in those galaxies in the process) in order to improve the flow of their energies. The heroes convince the Infinites not to destroy the Earth and the other threatened planets. At the end, the unofficial team began to make their way to an intergalactic bar.

Meanwhile, at the Intergalactic Council, the Skrull ambassador files a formal complaint against humans, charging that Professor X and a band of Skrull mutants known as Cadre K have been interfering in the extermination of other Skrull mutants. The council is attacked by Ego the Living Planet and are rescued by Professor X and Cadre K. A new race, the Ruul, helps to miniaturize and imprison Ego. Despite the human assistance, the council sides with the Skrulls and votes to take action against Earth.

Earth's solar system is surrounded by a force field, and Earth is turned into a prison for intergalactic criminals, the Council reasoning that the criminals will keep Earth too occupied to do anything about the wider universe. Ronan the Accuser acts as warden from an orbiting space craft. The Avengers learn the miniaturized Ego is among the aliens condemned to Earth and that he is expanding and becoming one with the Earth. At the rate it grows, it could possibly assimilate the entire Earth within a week.

Iron Man, the Fantastic Four, and the Silver Surfer work to stop Ego from expanding. Meanwhile, Cadre K try to convince the Intergalactic Council to reverse its actions but are resisted by the Skrull ambassador. On Earth, people rally the alien criminals to fight back against Ronan.

Meanwhile, at a S.H.I.E.L.D. base on the moon, the Ruul release their leader, the Supreme Intelligence. At the same time, Cadre K is imprisoned as a result of their interruption of the council meeting.

While the Avengers Infinity group are held by the Shi'ar, the Ruul imprison them under the orders of the Supreme Intelligence. The Supreme Intelligence tells them how he made use of the Destiny Crystal, a device of great power he recently acquired. He used the crystal to accelerate the evolution of the Kree, creating the Ruul, who then manipulated the Council in a plan to get revenge on and destroy the Avengers and Earth. He will then use Ego's power as a weapon to expand the Kree empire.

U.S. Agent persuades the alien prisoners to fight on the side of Earth. He takes command of the Avengers and all the other heroes they can find and leads an attack on Ronan's citadel. During the battle, the Avengers Infinity team free themselves and teleport to the Intergalactic Council. Moondragon telepathically explains the true situation to the Council. The Supreme Intelligence appears in front of the Council and admits the truth but claims that it is too late to stop it.

Using information obtained by Gambit, Quasar is able to absorb Ego into his Quantum Bands. Ronan is defeated, and the Supreme Intelligence's plan fails. Quasar decides to leave Earth to avoid the risk of unleashing Ego again. The Council removes the alien criminals from Earth and decides to take no further action against humans for the time being.

=== Tie-ins ===
- Maximum Security: Dangerous Planet #1
- Maximum Security: Thor vs. Ego #1 (reprints classic Thor stories featuring Ego)
- The Amazing Spider-Man vol. 2, #24
- Avengers vol. 3, #35
- Bishop:The Last X-Man #15
- Black Panther vol. 3, #25
- Captain America vol. 3, #36
- Captain Marvel vol. 3, #12
- Gambit vol. 3, #23
- The Incredible Hulk vol. 3, #21
- Iron Man vol. 3, #35
- Marvel Knights vol. 1, #6
- Peter Parker: Spider-Man #24
- Thor vol. 2, #30
- Thunderbolts vol. 1, #45
- Uncanny X-Men #387
- X-Men vol. 2 #107
- X-Men Unlimited #29

=== Collected editions ===
Some of the issues are collected in the Avengers/X-Men: Maximum Security trade paperback (ISBN 978-0785144991):

- Maximum Security #1-3
- Maximum Security: Dangerous Planet #1
- Avengers vol. 3 #35
- Bishop: The Last X-Man #15
- Captain America vol. 3 #36
- Gambit vol. 3 #23
- Iron Man vol. 3 #35 and part of last four pages of #34
- Thor vol. 2 #30
- Uncanny X-Men #387
- X-Men vol. 2 #107
- X-Men Unlimited #29

The Busiek stories are included in Avengers Assemble, Vol. 4 (ISBN 978-0785161974):

- Maximum Security #1-3
- Maximum Security: Dangerous Planet #1
- Avengers vol. 3 #35-44
- Avengers Annual 2001

Other issues are collected in other books:

- The Amazing Spider-Man vol. 2 #24 is in Spider-Man: Revenge of the Green Goblin (ISBN 978-1302907006)
- Black Panther vol. 3 #25 is in Black Panther by Christopher Priest: The Complete Collection Vol. 2 (ISBN 978-0785198116)
- Captain Marvel vol. 3, #12 is in Captain Marvel Vol. 2: Coven (ISBN 978-0785113065)
- The Incredible Hulk vol. 3 #21 is in The Incredible Hulk: Past Perfect (ISBN 978-0785162148)
- Thunderbolts vol. 1 #45 is in Hawkeye & the Thunderbolts Vol. 2 (ISBN 978-0785195474)
- Marvel Knights vol. 1 #6 is in Marvel Knights by Dixon & Barreto: Defenders of the Streets (ISBN 978-1302912130)
- Peter Parker: Spider-Man #24 is in Spider-Man: Light in the Darkness (ISBN 978-1302918637)
