= Superman: Secret Identity =

Comic book series

- Cover of Superman: Secret Identity #1, art by Stuart Immonen

Publication information
- Publisher: DC Comics
- Schedule: Monthly
- Format: Limited series
- Genre: Superhero
- Publication date: January – April 2004
- No. of issues: 4
- Main character: Clark Kent

Creative team
- Written by: Kurt Busiek
- Artist: Stuart Immonen

Collected editions
- Paperback: ISBN 978-8419-021-66-3
- Hardcover: ISBN 978-1401-258-69-6

Superman: Secret Identity is a four-issue mini-series written by Kurt Busiek and illustrated by Stuart Immonen. It was first published monthly, starting January 2004. The title was not released under the Elseworlds banner, but is regarded as a non-canonical story.

The story describes the life of Clark Kent, a man in a world in which superheroes exist only as characters in comics, who suddenly gains the powers of Superman and embarks on a super-heroic career, but keeps his existence secret from the world at large.

== Publication history ==
Writer Kurt Busiek stated in the introduction to the collected volume of Superman: Secret Identity that his inspiration for this story was the original appearances of Superboy-Prime (a character created by Elliot S. Maggin and Curt Swan) for Crisis on Infinite Earths in DC Comics Presents. The series developed by Busiek over the course of twenty years and reimagines the story of Superboy-Prime had he not been transported to the DC Universe after developing the powers of Superman.

Busiek later wrote a spiritual companion series Batman: Creature of the Night published by DC Comics in 2017.

== Story ==
=== Issue #1 ===
David and Laura Kent, a farmer couple living in a small town called Picketsville, Kansas, name their child Clark Kent, after the fictional character, Superman.

Clark, essentially average in every way, although perceptive and intelligent, grows up resenting the joke, accepting the inevitable Superman-related gifts with a smile, and endures being the butt of jokes and bullying at school.

He retreats to his "Fortress of Solitude", a broken-down farm tractor, where he writes using an old typewriter, developing talent as a writer. For recreation, he often escapes on overnight hiking trips.

One night on such a trip, Clark awakens in a restless dream to find himself floating in mid-air and discovers that he now has the powers of Superman. He uses the powers at first to avoid his high school tormentors, then begins to secretly use them to rescue people in danger. The incidents of heroism prompt inquiries from journalists and government agents, putting him under pressure to preserve his secret or to reveal his powers to the public.

He makes a deal with Wendy Case, the reporter who first wrote about him, for her to handle his publicity to explore the nature of his powers together. But when he discovers her secretly video-recording him, he destroys the camera and resolves to go public with his powers on his own. Clark wears a Superboy costume to the town's Halloween carnival, where an explosion at the carnival puts people's lives in danger, and he rescues them. Reporters (including Wendy, who set up the explosion to reveal "Superboy") come upon him as he is rescuing his longtime crush, Cassie. Clark pretends that the rescue was not super-powered, becoming a local hero, earning the respect of his former tormentors, and the affection of Cassie.

However, several people are killed as a result of the bombing incident, and Clark resolves to keep his powers hidden, performing lifesaving feats only in secret.

=== Issue #2 ===
Now in his mid-twenties, Clark has moved to Manhattan, where he writes for The New Yorker and begins working on a book. He continues saving lives dressed as Superman, but keeps his actual existence secret (counting on reports by people being saved by the supposedly-fictional Superman to be dismissed as internet legends), as government agents continue to investigate his activities. His coworkers set him up with an Indian-American woman named Lois Chaudhari as a joke, who initially storms out of the setup date.

Following Lois as she stalks down the street, Clark apologizes for his co-workers' prank, and Lois explains that she, too, has been set up with numerous "Clarks", several "Kals" and a "Jimmy Olsen". Upon this, the pair hit it off and start a relationship.

Clark is lured into a trap, knocked out by a powerful electrical-blast weapon, and taken to a government facility, where they attempt to extract tissue samples. He escapes, evacuating the unconscious soldiers and destroying the building.

He begins wearing glasses to make himself less easily recognized, and continues performing rescues, but is more cautious. Meanwhile, his writing career takes off and he embarks on life as a major book author. Clark reveals his secret to Lois, who agrees to support him, and no longer alone, Clark is ready to face whatever lies ahead.

=== Issue #3 ===
Years later, Clark continues his successful writing career while continuing his secret heroic exploits, still evading the government. Lois, a successful residential designer, has built a thriving career of her own, and the pair build an ocean house on the coast of Maine, where Lois informs Clark she is pregnant.

Concerned about the possible effects of his powers on the unborn twins, and fearful of continued efforts by the government to capture him, Clark decides to offer to make a deal.

After an abortive first contact with Agent Malloy, during which the government makes another failed attempt to take Clark into custody, they come to terms: Clark will take non-political missions for the government; in return, the government will leave Clark and his family alone. He is called on a mission to rescue hostages in South America just as Lois goes into labor, which he grudgingly accepts as the cost of his agreement. Completing the mission, Clark realizes that despite Malloy's assurances, the mission was beneficial to the government (although indirectly). Clark and Malloy continue a wary but cooperative relationship.

Returning to the hospital to see his wife and newborn daughters, he swears that he will keep them safe, no matter what it takes. Lois resolves the twins will not be named "Lara or Kara or Lana" or anything else "super-related".

=== Issue #4 ===
Approximately 25–30 years later, Clark has become an accomplished writer, and Lois a famous designer. Their daughters Carol and Jane have come home for the holidays, bearing Superman-related gifts to tease their father.

Clark and Lois have noticed that at age 57, his powers are fading, but he continues his government missions, becoming friendly with Malloy during their regular briefing meetings while still protecting his identity.

Clark decides to do research in his capacity as an author, uncovering records of government research into super-powered people, and concludes that his powers are the result of a meteor shower in Kansas exposing him to unknown agents, and his subconscious shaping his powers to match the Superman archetype. Clark and Lois suspect their daughters may also have developed powers, but leave them to explore this possibility on their own.

In the midst of making a challenging rescue of a supersonic passenger train, testing the limits of his powers, Clark is confronted with his daughters, wearing variations of his uniform, helping to perform the rescue. Carol and Jane admit that their powers manifested in their teens. Clark is proud and somewhat chagrined to learn that the girls had known his identity for several years. Together the three fly to the Maine ocean house where Lois is pleased all three super-members of the family have revealed themselves to each other.

Shortly after, Malloy, now in his mid-sixties, tells Clark he is planning to retire, and further reveals that he had uncovered Clark's identity decades ago, but never reported it to his superiors: "I have children too, Clark. Sons" is his only explanation.

Malloy has since destroyed any evidence that might reveal the secret to others. Malloy reveals he has enjoyed Clark's books as an author. Clark bemusedly thinks, "I'll have to send (Malloy) a case of Scotch, after all".

With his daughters carrying on his superheroics, Clark retires as well. A decade or so later, now-elderly Clark lives in a world that accepts superhumans amongst them, resulting in advancements in every area of science. Jane has teenage sons whom she has jokingly named Perry, Jimmy, and Clark.

Clark, wrapping up his writing career, publishes his book of research on his own origins, though he keeps his family out of it.

Retired and content, his powers much diminished but still effective (he now wears a uniform padded with extra insulation against subzero cold at high altitudes), he still flies with his daughters, as well as grandson Perry at times, who has since also discovered powers of his own.

== Collected editions ==
Title	Material collected	Publication date	Binding	Ref
Superman: Secret Identity	#1–4	April 3, 2013	Softcover	
Superman: Secret Identity	#1–4	January 13, 2016	Hardcover	
