= Carlos Pacheco =

Spanish comics artist and penciller (1961–2022)

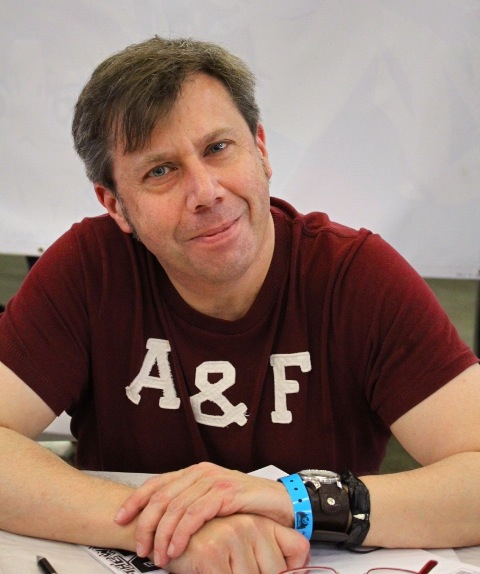
- Pacheco at the 2013 Wizard World New York Experience in Manhattan
- Born: Carlos Pacheco Perujo; 14 November 1961 San Roque, Spain
- Died: 9 November 2022 (aged 60) La Línea de la Concepción, Spain
- Areas: Penciller, inker, writer
- Notable works: Avengers Forever; Fantastic Four vol. 3 Superman

Carlos Pacheco Perujo (14 November 1961 – 9 November 2022) was a Spanish comics penciller. After breaking into the European market doing cover work for Planeta De Agostini, he gained recognition doing work for Marvel UK, the England-based branch of Marvel Comics, for his work on the Spider-Man magazine Dark Guard. He then began doing work for the American-based Marvel and DC Comics, where he was one of the first Spanish-born artists to make a major impact in that country, attaining popularity for his work on Avengers Forever, JLA/JSA: Virtue and Vice, X-Men: Legacy, Fantastic Four, Green Lantern, and Captain America. He contributed to some high-profile storylines published by the Big Two, including 2009's "Final Crisis" at DC and 2013's "Age of Ultron" at Marvel.

Outside of corporate-owned comics, he reunited with his Avengers Forever collaborator, writer Kurt Busiek, to produce through WildStorm the 2003 creator-owned fantasy series Arrowsmith, which reimagines World War I in a world in which magic and dragons exist. That series garnered positive reviews, and an Eisner Award nomination for Best Limited Series. In 2022, Pacheco and Busiek produced a sequel, Arrowsmith: Behind Enemy Lines, which was also positively received, and was one of Pacheco's last published works.

== Early life ==
Carlos Pacheco Perujo was born 14 November 1961 in San Roque, Spain.

== Career ==
Pacheco was studying biology in Seville when he began working in comics, his first work being in Spanish-language editions of Marvel Comics published under the Cómics Forum imprint at Planeta De Agostini. He primarily drew covers, posters and pin-ups for Spanish translated editions of Marvel Comics, published at the time by Planeta under the imprint called Cómics Forum.

Pacheco's first published superhero comic was an eight-page story titled American Soldier with writer and translator Antonio Moreno, and published as a back-up in Marvel Héroes #41 (May 1991).

Pacheco later teamed up with writer Rafael Marín to create the characters Iberia Inc. and Tríada Vértice, two groups of Spanish superheroes, that starred in two miniseries published by Planeta-DeAgostini Comics under the imprint called "Línea Laberinto", with plots by Pacheco and Marín, script by Marín and art by Rafa Fonteri (in Iberia Inc.) and Jesus Merino (in Tríada Vértice).

Cover artwork for Justice Society of America #50 (Sept. 2003) by Carlos Pacheco and Jesus Merino

Pacheco first got attention in the United States for his work as penciller on Dark Guard, a four-issue Marvel UK title, and the first book he fully drew by himself, That assignment teamed him with writer Dan Abnett and inker Oscar Jimenez. This led to his international career, which began in 1993, when he was offered the art duties on Marvel Comics' Bishop miniseries, which was published in 1994, and which teamed him with writer John Ostrander and inker Cam Smith. Later that year Pacheco did his first work for DC Comics on The Flash #93–94 and #99, with writer Mark Waid and inker Jose Marzan Jr.

After that Pacheco's next stateside work came in 1995's X-Universe two-part limited series (a part of the "Age of Apocalypse" storyline), published by Marvel. Pacheco was joined by writer Terry Kavanagh and was again inked by Cam Smith. In late 1995 and early 1996, Pacheco and Smith collaborated with writer Warren Ellis on a Starjammers limited series. This series was successful enough that the creative team was reunited on Marvel's Excalibur ongoing series for a brief run in 1996. Shortly after this Pacheco became penciller on Marvel's Fantastic Four for two issues (#415–416), where he worked with writer Tom DeFalco as the title wrapped up in preparation for the "Heroes Reborn" storyline. By that point Pacheco's art had become a fan favorite, with his work regularly getting coverage in magazines such as Wizard. In early 1997 Marvel acknowledged this by assigning Pacheco to one of its flagship titles, X-Men, with #62 (March 1997). On that title he worked with writers Scott Lobdell and Joe Kelly and inker Art Thibert and produced the "Operation: Zero Tolerance" storyline. He left the series at #75 in May 1998.

After X-Men, Pacheco began work on Avengers Forever, a 12-issue limited series, where Pacheco worked with writers Kurt Busiek and Roger Stern and for the first time in the U.S. inker Jesus Merino, who from that point on became Pacheco's regular inker.

Pacheco's next assignment was in 2000, a four-issue Inhumans limited series, co-written with Rafael Marín with pencils by José Ladrönn and Jorge Lucas. Pacheco wrote, again with co-writer Rafael Marín, a return to the Fantastic Four, with vol. 3 #35. This time he took on the co-writing chores (initially with Rafael Marín, later joined by Jeph Loeb) as well as pencilling duties. Pacheco's pencilling contributions were shorter than expected, with his last art contribution coming in #50, and him leaving the series entirely by #54.

His next substantial work after Fantastic Four was for DC Comics: JLA/JSA: Virtue and Vice, with writers David S. Goyer and Geoff Johns. This 96-page graphic novel united the Justice League and the Justice Society against common foes in the style of what once had been an annual tradition.

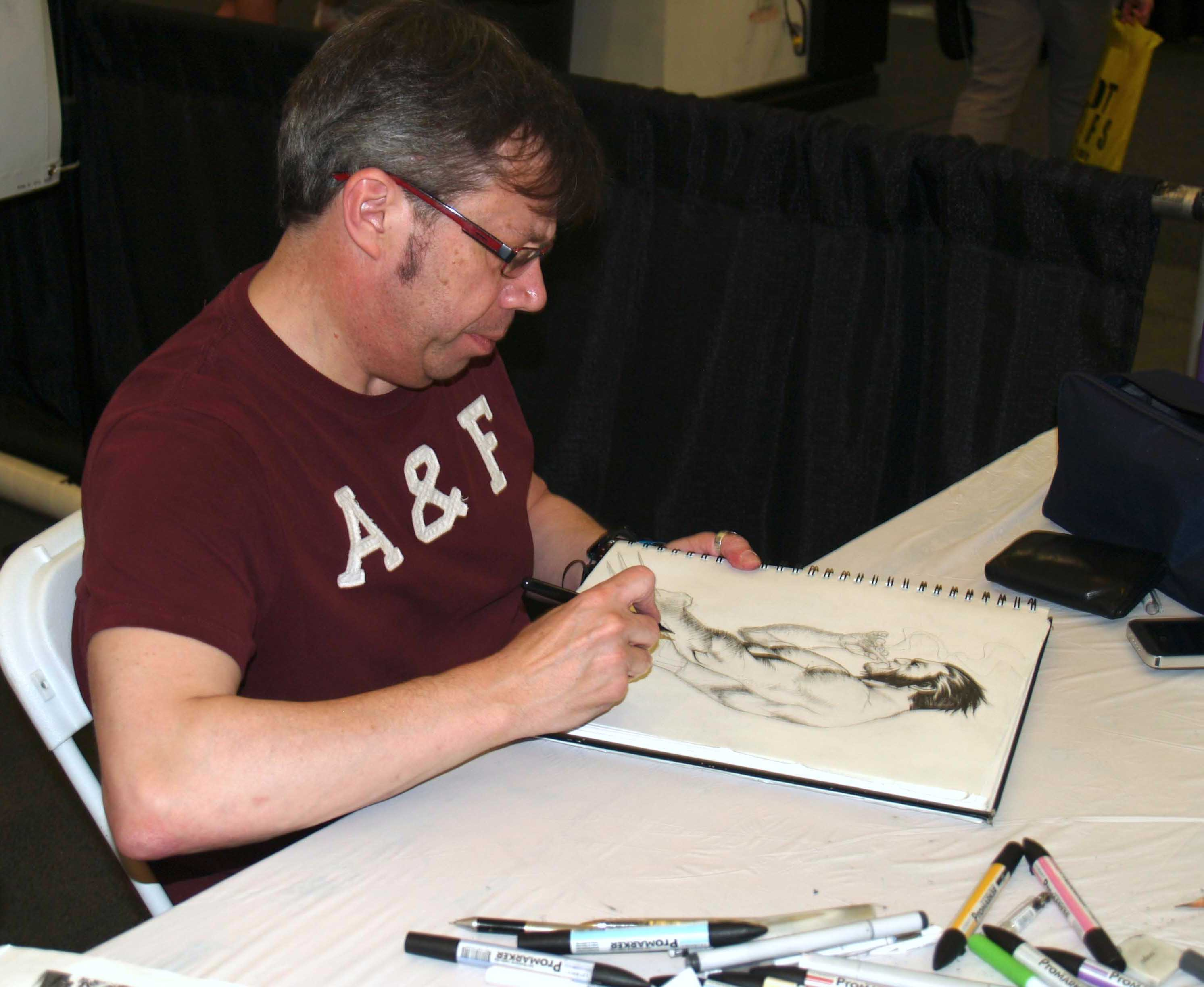
Pacheco sketching Wolverine

In 2003 Pacheco reunited with his Avengers Forever collaborator Kurt Busiek for the creator-owned fantasy war series Arrowsmith, published by WildStorm. This series envisioned a world where magic is real and the First World War was fought with dragons, spells, vampires and others used as weapons by both sides. The six-issue miniseries garnered positive reviews, holding a score of 7.8 out of 10 at the review aggregator website Comic Book Roundup. The series earned Pacheco and Busiek and an Eisner Award nomination for Best Limited Series.

Pacheco returned to DC Comics to pencil the "Absolute Power" storyline in Superman/Batman #14–18 (Jan.–April 2005), where he was again joined by writer Jeph Loeb. The two told a tale in which, due to the time-traveling machinations of the Legion of Super-Villains, Batman and Superman took over the world and a group of Freedom Fighters has to rise up against them. Later that year at DC, Pacheco shared alternate monthly pencilling duties with Ethan Van Sciver on the new Green Lantern series written by Geoff Johns.

From 2006 to 2007, Pacheco worked with Kurt Busiek on DC comics' Superman, illustrating issues #654–658, 662–664, and 667. Due to the difficulty of drawing twelve issues a year, the final chapter of their "Camelot Falls" story arc appeared in Superman Annual #13 (January 2008).

In 2008, Pacheco produced covers for DC's weekly series Trinity, featuring Batman, Superman and Wonder Woman, and assisted artist J. G. Jones in illustrating the 2008-09 miniseries Final Crisis, on issues #4 to #6.

In February 2009, Comic Shop News announced that Pacheco signed an exclusive contract with Marvel. Pacheco's 2009 work included Ultimate Comics: Avengers. Pacheco was one of the artists on the Age of Ultron limited series in 2013 and collaborated with writer Rick Remender on the Captain America series later that year.

In 2022, Pacheco and Busiek reunited on a sequel, Arrowsmith: Behind Enemy Lines, which garnered critical acclaim.

In September 2022, Pacheco announced his retirement, and tweeted his final comics work, the cover to Damage Control vol. 4 #2, which featured the characters Ant-Man and Wasp.

== Awards and accolades ==
In 1996 the comics news magazine Dolmen named Pacheco its Best Spanish Creator. That same year, Wizard named Pacheco the Newcomer of the Year. That magazine included him in its list of the Top Ten Artists from 1997 to 2001, when he was ranked in the Number One spot.

In 2001 Pacheco received the award for Best Spanish Cartoonist at the Granada Comic Fair. In 2004, he received a similar award during Estepona Fantasy and Horror Film Week. That same year, he and writer Kurt Busiek were nominated for an Eisner Award for Best Limited Series for their work on Arrowsmith. At the 2010 Granada International Comic Fair, he was awarded the Andalucía del Cómic Award, in its first edition.

Pacheco was lauded for his accomplished in the town and country of his birth. In 2001 Pacheco he recognized as Hijo Predilecto ("Predilect Son", or "Favorite Son") by the Mayor of San Roque, where he was born. In 2011 the Commonwealth awarded him the Medal of the Campo de Gibraltar. In 2016 he was awarded the Medal of the Province of Cádiz. That same year, a street in San Roque was named after him.

== Personal life and death ==
On April 14, 2022, Pacheco revealed on Twitter that he would be taking a sabbatical from his work, due to paralysis in his right leg that began the previous September, which had been caused by compression of nerves from the L5 vertebrae to his legs, and would undergo surgery and a rehabilitation period of 8–12 months. Pacheco explained that this was the reason why he was unable to complete his Fantastic Four assignment. That June, Pacheco's collaborator on Arrowsmith: Behind Enemy Lines Kurt Busiek stated in the final issue of that miniseries that its follow-up, Arrowsmith: Beyond Borders, would be delayed due both to his own persistent migraine problems and Pacheco's paralysis, which he revealed was the result of a small, difficult-to-detect spinal fracture. In September 2022, Pacheco announced on his Facebook page that he had been diagnosed with amyotrophic lateral sclerosis, or ALS.

Pacheco died at La Línea Hospital in La Línea de la Concepción on 9 November 2022, at around 7.30pm CET, at the age of 60.

Marvel Comics memorialized Pacheco in a tweet posted on the day of his death, which read, "We mourn the loss of a dear part of the Marvel family, comic artist & writer Carlos Pacheco. His legacy of iconic designs and storytelling like Avengers Forever, Fantastic Four, X-Men, Excalibur, Captain America, and more will be remembered. Our thoughts are with his loved ones."

Juan Carlos Ruiz Boi, the mayor of Pacheco's birthplace San Roque, declared two days of official mourning. Flags at government institutions were lowered to half-mast. After consulting with Pacheco's family, Ruiz Boi also decided to create a funeral chapel in the plenary hall of the Palacio de los Gobernadores (Palace Of The Governors), at which the public would be able to pay their respects. Ruiz Boi praised Pacheco for registering as an organ donor, stating, "All of us who have known him will miss him, and he would like to offer condolences to his family and friends. I am sure that the rest of the Corporation and the people of San Roque will share my words, as well as the fact that two days of official mourning have been decreed. Likewise, a burning chapel is going to be set up in the Palace of the Governors so that all the people who wish to can pay homage to him… Our sadness is only lessened by the knowledge that in life, he achieved the recognition of all around him, that he knew and appreciated it. He was grateful that the City Council put up an avenue in his name, that he was named the town's Favourite Son and that, in his honour, there is a contest named after him."

Journalist Heidi MacDonald noted that one of Pacheco's final tweets was a set of lyrics from the song "And When I Die", re-recorded by Blood, Sweat and Tears, which MacDonald felt served as a fitting obituary for the artist:

And when I die
and when I'm dead, dead and gone,
There'll be one child born and
a world to carry on, to carry on
I'm not scared of dying
and I don't really care
If it's peace you find in dying,
well, then let the time be near.

== Bibliography ==
Interior art (except where noted) includes:

=== DC Comics ===
- 9-11: The World's Finest Comic Book Writers & Artists Tell Stories to Remember, Volume Two (2002)
- Arrowsmith, miniseries, #1–6 (2003–2004)
- Astro City/Arrowsmith (2004)
- DC Universe #0 (2008)
- Final Crisis, miniseries, #4–6 (among other artists) (2008–2009)
- The Flash vol. 2 #93–94, 99–100 (1994–1995)
- Green Lantern vol. 4 #1–3, 7–8 (2005–2006)
- Green Lantern / Sinestro Corps: Secret Files #1 (2008)
- JLA/JSA: Virtue and Vice (2002)
- Justice League of America vol. 2 #21 (2008)
- Superman #654–659, 662–664, 667, Annual #13 (2006–2008)
- Superman/Batman #14–18, 26 (2005–06)

=== Image Comics ===
- Common Grounds #4 (2004)
- Arrowsmith: Behind Enemy Lines (2022)

=== Marvel Comics ===
- Age of Ultron #6–7, 9–10 (2013)
- Astonishing X-Men vol. 4 #4 (2017)
- Avengers / Squadron Supreme '98 (1998)
- Avengers Forever limited series #1–12 (1998–2000)
- Bishop miniseries #1–4 (1994–1995)
- Cable vol. 3 #1–3 (2017)
- Captain America vol. 7 #11–12, 14–15, 22–25 (2013–2014)
- Dark Guard miniseries #1–4 (Marvel UK, 1993–1994)
- Excalibur #90 (among other artists); #95–96, 98, 103 (full art) (1995–1996)
- Fantastic Four #415–416 (1996)
- Fantastic Four vol. 3 #35–41, 44, 47–50 (writer/artist), #42–43, 45–46, 51–54 (writer only, 2000–2002)
- The Incredible Hulk vol. 4 #12 (2012)
- Inhumans vol. 3 #1–4 (writer) (2000)
- The Life of Captain Marvel #1–5 (2018–2019)
- Motormouth & Killpower #12 (1993)
- Occupy Avengers #1–4 (2016–2017)
- Phoenix Resurrection: The Return of Jean Grey #2 (2018)
- S.H.I.E.L.D. #1 (2015)
- Squadron Sinister miniseries #1–4 (2015)
- Starjammers miniseries #1–4 (1995–1996)
- Thor vol. 2 #57 (among other artists) (2003)
- Ultimate Comics: Avengers miniseries #1–6 (2009–2010)
- Ultimate Comics: Thor #1–4 (2010–2011)
- Uncanny Avengers vol. 3 #5–6 (2016)
- Uncanny Inhumans #11–13 (2016)
- Uncanny X-Men #534.1 (2011)
- Uncanny X-Men vol. 2 #1–3, 9–10, 20 (2011–2012)
- Wolverine #127 (among other artists) (1998)
- X-Men vol. 2 #62–67, -1, 69–72, 74 (1997–1998)
- X-Men: Schism miniseries #1 (2011)
- X-Universe miniseries #1–2 (1995)

Preceded by Cedric Nocon	X-Men vol. 2 artist 1997–1998	Succeeded by German Garcia
Preceded by John Francis Moore	Fantastic Four writer 2000–2002 (with Rafael Marín) (with Rafael Marín and Jeph Loeb in 2001-2002) (with Rafael Marín and Karl Kesel in 2002)	Succeeded by Karl Kesel
Preceded by Michael Turner	Superman/Batman artist 2005	Succeeded by Ian Churchill
Preceded by Pete Woods	Superman artist 2006–2007	Succeeded by Rick Leonardi
