= Kurt Busiek =

American comic book writer

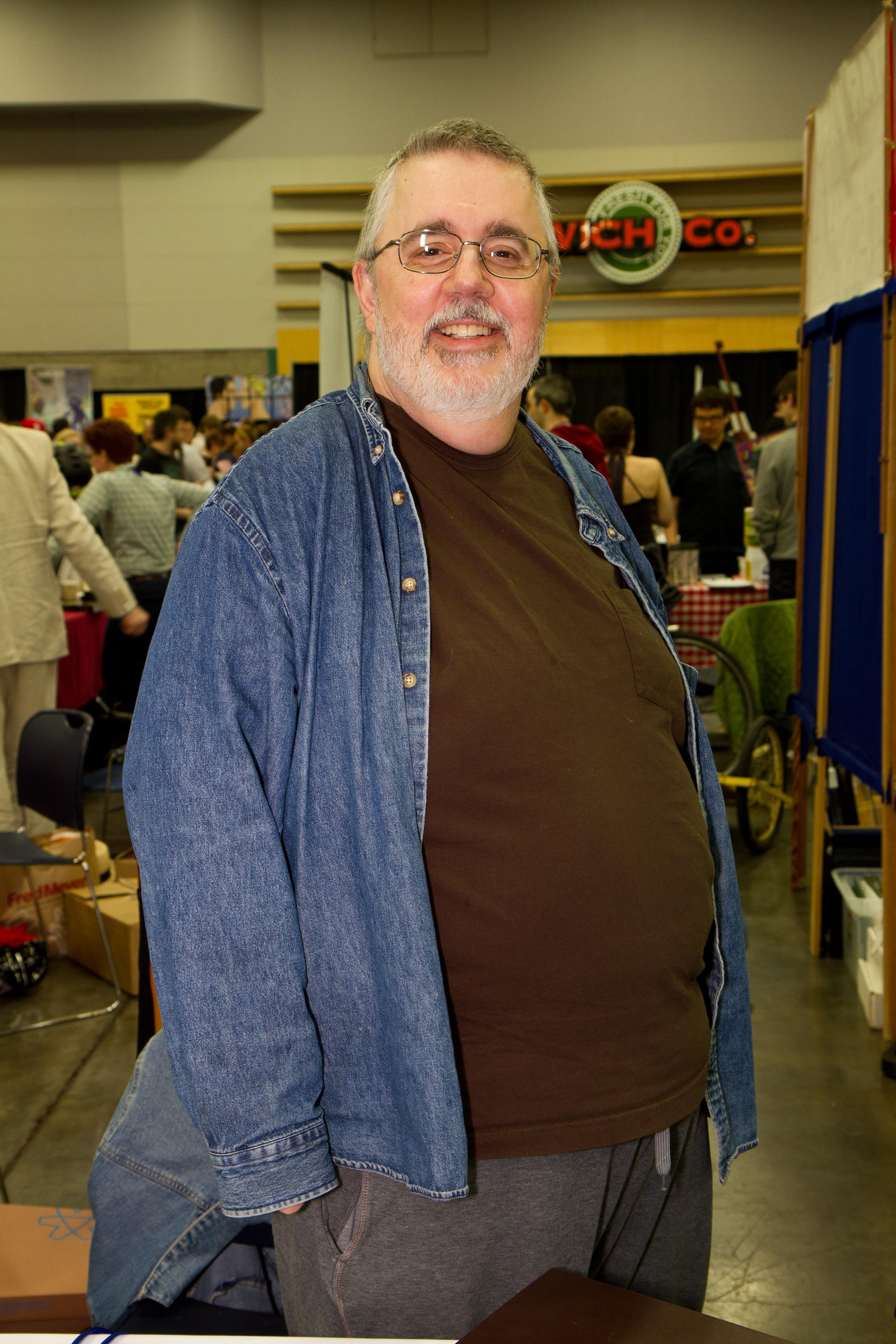
- Busiek at the Stumptown Comics Fest 2012
- Born: September 16, 1960 (age 66) Boston, Massachusetts, U.S.
- Area: Writer
- Notable works: Astro City; The Avengers; Thunderbolts; Marvels; Superman
- Awards: Full list

Kurt Busiek (/ˈbjuːsɪk/ BYOO-sik; born September 16, 1960) is an American comic book writer. His work includes the Marvels limited series, his own series titled Astro City, a four-year run on The Avengers, Thunderbolts, and Superman.

== Early life ==
Busiek was born in Boston. He grew up in various towns in the Boston area, including Lexington, where he befriended future comic book creator Scott McCloud. Busiek did not read comics as a youngster, as his parents disapproved of them. He began to regularly read them around the age of 14, when he picked up a copy of Daredevil #120 (April 1975). That comic is the first part of a continuity-heavy four-part story arc; he was drawn to the copious history and cross-connections with other series. Throughout high school and college, he and McCloud practiced making comics. The pair contributed to comics hobbyist publications such as NMP's Comics Feature.

During that time, Busiek had many letters published in comic book letter columns and he originated the idea that the Phoenix Force was a separate being who had impersonated Jean Grey, and that therefore Grey had not died—a premise which made its way from freelancer to freelancer, and which was eventually used in the comics. Busiek said, "A couple of years later, after I’d broken in, I attended my first convention as a pro, in Ithaca, New York, and I stayed at Roger Stern's house... we were talking about how much we liked the new X-Men, and he said, 'It's just a pity there's no way to bring Jean Grey back'... I said, 'Sure there's a way, there's always a way.'"

== Career ==
During the last semester of his senior year, Busiek submitted some sample scripts to editor Dick Giordano at DC Comics. None of them sold, but they got him invitations to pitch other material to DC editors, which led to his first professional work, a back-up story in Green Lantern #162 (March 1983). After writing four fill-in issues of Power Man and Iron Fist, he was given the series as his first regular assignment. He was a fan of the work of his predecessor, Jo Duffy and emulated her lighthearted, humorous approach, not knowing that the editor disapproved of that style. He was fired from the series after only six issues as its regular writer, but wrote an additional two issues afterward. In 1985, he wrote a Red Tornado limited series.

In 1993, Busiek and artist Alex Ross produced the Marvels limited series which comics historian Matthew K. Manning noted, "reinvigorated painted comics as a genre, went on to become an acclaimed masterpiece, and spawned more than its own fair share of imitators." Busiek and Pat Olliffe crafted the Untold Tales of Spider-Man series beginning in September 1995. Busiek created the Thunderbolts, a group of super-villains disguised as super-heroes. At the end of the first issue, it is revealed that the Thunderbolts are actually the Masters of Evil, a surprise twist carefully guarded by Marvel. In February 1998, he launched The Avengers vol. 3 with penciler George Pérez and Iron Man vol. 3 with artist Sean Chen. Busiek and Carlos Pacheco collaborated on the Avengers Forever limited series in 1998–1999 which replaced the Avengers: World in Chains series on which the two had previously planned to work.

Busiek continued as writer of The Avengers through 2002, collaborating with artists such as Alan Davis and Kieron Dwyer. His tenure culminated with the "Kang Dynasty" storyline. In 2003, Busiek re-teamed with Pérez to create the JLA/Avengers limited series. Busiek has worked on a number of different titles in his career including Arrowsmith, The Liberty Project, The Power Company, Shockrockets, Superman: Secret Identity, JLA, and the award-winning Kurt Busiek's Astro City. In the 1990s, work on some of Busiek's more challenging, less mainstream projects, most notably Astro City, was repeatedly delayed by health problems brought about by mercury poisoning.

In 2004, Busiek began a new Conan series for Dark Horse Comics. In December 2005, he signed a two-year exclusive contract with DC Comics. After DC's "Infinite Crisis" storyline, he teamed with Geoff Johns on the eight-part story arc "Up, Up and Away!" that ran in both Superman titles as part of DC's company-wide "One Year Later" storyline. In addition, he began writing the DC title Aquaman: Sword of Atlantis from issues #40–49. Busiek became the sole writer of the Superman series with issue #654 (Sept. 2006) and Carlos Pacheco became the series' artist. Busiek and Pacheco developed an extended storyline featuring Arion coming into conflict with Superman. The plotline concluded in Superman Annual #13. Busiek wrote a 52-issue weekly DC miniseries titled Trinity starring Batman, Superman and Wonder Woman. Each issue except for the first featured a 12-page main story by Busiek, with art by Mark Bagley, and a ten-page backup story co-written by Busiek and Fabian Nicieza with art from various artists, including Tom Derenick, Mike Norton, and Scott McDaniel.

Busiek teamed with Alex Ross on Dynamite Entertainment's Kirby: Genesis, an eight-issue miniseries which debuted in 2011. The series, which was their first full collaboration since Marvels 17 years previous, featured a large group of Jack Kirby's creator-owned characters, the rights to which were acquired by Dynamite such as Silver Star, Captain Victory, Galaxy Green, Tiger 21 and the Ninth Men. Ross co-plotted, handled designs, and oversaw the series overall with Busiek, who scripted the story. In June 2013, Busiek relaunched his Astro City series as part of DC's Vertigo line. Busiek commented that "Astro City's always been aimed at a more sophisticated reader, which I think suits Vertigo. Plus our backlist sales are closer to a Vertigo pattern than DCU." The ongoing Astro City series concluded as of issue #52 in 2018.

In April 2022, Busiek was one of more than three dozen comics creators who contributed to Operation USA's benefit anthology book, Comics for Ukraine: Sunflower Seeds, a project spearheaded by IDW Publishing special projects editor Scott Dunbier, The profits were donated to relief efforts for Ukrainian refugees from the February 2022 Russian invasion of Ukraine. Busiek and Brent Anderson contributed a new Astro City story to the anthology, which featured themes relevant to the events in Ukraine.

== Awards ==
Busiek's work has won him numerous awards in the comics industry, including the Harvey Award for Best Writer in 1998 and the Eisner Award for Best Writer in 1999. In 1994, with Marvels, he won Best Finite Series/Limited Series Eisner Award and the Best Continuing or Limited Series Harvey Award, as well as the Harvey Award for Best Single Issue or Story (for Marvels #4) in 1995. In 1996, with Astro City, he won both the Eisner and Harvey awards for Best New Series. He won the Best Single Issue/Single Story Eisner three years in a row from 1996 to 1998 for Astro City; for Conan: The Legend #0 in 2004. Busiek won the Best Continuing Series Eisner Award in 1997–1998, as well as the Best Serialized Story award in 1998. In addition, Astro City was awarded the 1996 Best Single Issue or Story Harvey Award, and the 1998 Harvey Award for Best Continuing or Limited Series.

Busiek was given the 1998 and 1999 Comics Buyer's Guide Awards for Favorite Writer, with additional nominations in 1997 and every year from 2000 to 2004. In 2010, he was given the Inkpot Award.

== Personal life ==
Busiek is married to Ann Busiek. Both Kurt and Ann were rendered by Alex Ross as New Yorkers who react to the invasion of Silver Surfer and Galactus on page 17 of Marvels #3. Kurt is used later as the model for a wandering drunk on page 33 of the same issue.

In June 2022, Kurt Busiek revealed in the final issue of Arrowsmith: Behind Enemy Lines that the follow-up series Arrowsmith: Beyond Borders, would be delayed due to his health. Specifically, he related that he had been suffering from persistent migraines for over a year, for which he was receiving Botox treatments every three months, which reduced his productivity. He said that he was searching for a hospital with an advanced headache program where he could be placed.

== Bibliography ==
=== Dark Horse Comics ===
- Army of Darkness #1–3 (text articles) (1992–1993)
- Conan #1–28, 32, 39, 45–46 (2004–2007)
- Conan: The Frost-Giant's Daughter and Other Stories #1 (2005)
- Conan: Book of Thoth #1–4 (2006)
- Jonny Demon #1–3 (1994)
- Young Indiana Jones Chronicles #1–8, 11 (1992–1993)

=== DC Comics ===
- Action Comics #837–843, 850, 852–854 (2006–2007)
- Aquaman: Sword of Atlantis #40–49 (2006–2007)
- Astro City vol. 3 #1–52 (2013–2018)
- Batman: Creature of the Night #1–4 (2018–2020)
- DC Comics Presents: Hawkman (2004)
- DCU Secret Files & Origins #1
- Green Lantern #162, 185 (backup stories) (1983–1985)
- Iron Lantern #1
- JLA #61 (backup story), #107–114 (2002–2005)
- JLA Secret Files & Origins #1 (2004)
- Justice League of America #224, 231–232, 240 (1984–1985)
- Legend of Wonder Woman #1–4 (1986)
- 9-11: The World's Finest Comic Book Writers & Artists Tell Stories to Remember, Volume Two ("Astro City" story) (2002)
- Power Company:
  - Power Company #1–18 (2002–2003)
  - Power Company: Bork (2002)
  - Power Company: Josiah Power (2002)
  - Power Company: Manhunter (2002)
  - Power Company: Sapphire (2002)
  - Power Company: Skyrocket (2002)
  - Power Company: Striker Z (2002)
  - Power Company: Witchfire (2002)
- Red Tornado #1–4 (1985)
- Showcase '94 #7 (1994)
- Silver Age: Green Lantern #1 (2000)
- Superman #650–675, 712, Annual #13 (2006–2011)
- Superman: Secret Identity #1–4 (2004)
- Superman: The Man of Steel Annual #5 (1996)
- Tales of The Green Lantern Corps Annual #3 (1987)
- Tangent Comics: Sea Devils #1 (1997)
- Trinity #1–52 (2008–2009)
- Valor #20–23 (1994)
- Wednesday Comics #1–12 (2009)
- Wonder Woman #318 (1984)
- World's Finest Comics #308–309 (1984)

==== DC Comics and Marvel Comics ====
- JLA/Avengers #1–4 (2003–2004)

==== Milestone Media ====
- Icon #11
- Static #12

==== Wildstorm ====
- Arrowsmith #1–6 (2003–2004)
- Astro City:
  - Astro City: A Visitor’s Guide #1 (2004)
  - Astro City: Local Heroes #1–5 (2003–2004)
  - Astro City: The Dark Age Book One #1–4 (2005)
  - Astro City: The Dark Age Book Two #1–4 (2007)
  - Astro City: The Dark Age Book Three #1–4 (2009)
  - Astro City: The Dark Age Book Four #1–4 (2010)
  - Astro City: Samaritan (2006)
  - Astro City: Beautie #1 (2008)
  - Astro City: Astra #1–2 (2009)
  - Astro City: Silver Agent #1–2 (2010)
  - Astro City/Arrowsmith #1 (2004)
  - Astro City Special #1 (2004)

=== Dynamite Entertainment ===
- Darkman vs. The Army of Darkness #1–5 (2006–2007)
- Kirby: Genesis #0, 1–8 (2011–2012)
- Vampirella Masters Series #4–5 (2011)

=== Eclipse Comics ===
- Airboy-Mr. Monster Special #1 (1987) (Liberty Project house ad)
- The Liberty Project #1–8 (1987–1988)
- Merchants Of Death #1–4 (1988)
- Miracleman: Apocrypha #2 (1992)
- Mr. Monster's Super Duper Special #7 (1987) (Liberty Project house ad)
- Total Eclipse Special: The Seraphim Objective #1
- Zot! #7 (1984) (backup story)

=== Harris Comics ===
- Creepy 1993 Fear Book #1 (1993)
- Vampirella vol. 2 #2–4 (1992)
- Vampirella: Morning In America #1–4 (1991–1993)

=== Image Comics ===
- Arrowsmith: Behind Enemy Lines #1-6 (2022)
- Astro City:
  - Kurt Busiek's Astro City #1–6 (1995–1996)
  - Kurt Busiek's Astro City vol. 2 #1/2 ("The Nearness of You"), #1–22 (1996–1998)
  - Astro City: That Was Then... (2022)
- New Shadowhawk #1–7 (1995–1996)
- Regulators #1–3 (1995)
- Shockrockets #1–6 (2000)
- Spartan: Warrior Spirit #1–4 (1995)
- Superstar: As Seen On TV #1 (2001)
- Shadowhawk Special #1 (1994)
- Shadowhawks Of Legend #1 (1995)
- Shattered Image #1–4 (1996)
- Tooth & Claw (renamed The Autumnlands: Tooth and Claw) #1- (2014-)
- Velocity: Thrill Of The Chase #1–3 (1995–1996)
- The Wizard's Tale (1997)
- Youngblood Strikefile #8 (1994)

=== Marvel Comics ===
- Amazing Fantasy #16–18 (1995–1996)
- The Amazing Spider-Man Annual '97 (1997)
- Avengers:
  - Avengers #0 (1999)
  - The Avengers vol. 3 #1–15, 19–56 (1998–2002)
  - Avengers Annual #19 (backup story) (1990)
  - Avengers/Squadron Supreme '98
  - Avengers 1999
  - Avengers 2000
  - Avengers 2001
  - Avengers Forever #1–12 (1998–1999)
  - Avengers: The Ultron Imperative (2001)
- Darkman #1–6 (1993)
- The Defenders vol. 2 #1–12 (2001–2002)
- Iron Man:
  - Iron Man vol. 3 #1–25 (#14–25 co-plot) (1998–2000)
  - Iron Man/Captain America '98 (1998)
  - Iron Man 1999
  - Iron Man: The Iron Age #1–2 (1998)
  - Iron Man vol. 6 #25 (2022)
- Marvel Age Annual #1 (1985)
- Marvel Holiday Special #4 (1995)
- Marvel Super-Heroes #9, 12–13 (1992–1993)
- Marvel Year-In-Review '92 (1992)
- Marvels #0, 1–4 (1993–1994)
- Marvels: Eye Of The Camera #1–6 (2009–2010)
- The Marvels #1-12 (2021–2022)
- Maximum Security #1–3 (2000–2001)
- Maximum Security: Dangerous Planet #1 (2000)
- Night Thrasher #15–18, 20–21 (1994–1995)
- Open Space #1 (1989)
- The Order: Defenders Against The Earth #1–6 (2002)
- Power Man and Iron Fist #90, 92–100, 102, 105 (1983–1984)
- The Spectacular Spider-Man #176–177 (1991)
- Spider-Man: Legacy of Evil #1 (1996)
- Spider-Man Team-Up #7 (1997) (featuring the Thunderbolts)
- Spider-Man Unlimited #2–5 (1993–1994)
- Spider-Man and X-Factor #1-3 (1994)
- Strange Tales vol. 3 #1 (1994)
- Tales of the Marvel Universe #1 (1997) (Thunderbolts story)
- The Incredible Hulk (Vol. 1) #378 (1991, with Peter David)
- Thor: Godstorm #1–3 (2001–2002)
- Thunderbolts:
  - Thunderbolts Vol. 1 #-1, 0, 1–33 (1997–2000)
  - Thunderbolts Annual '97
  - Captain America/Citizen V Annual '98 (1998)
  - Thunderbolts Annual 2000 (co-written by Fabian Nicieza)
  - Avengers/Thunderbolts #1–6 (2004)
  - Thunderbolts Vol. 3 #10 (backup story)
- Untold Tales of Spider-Man:
  - Untold Tales of Spider-Man #1–25 (1995–1997)
  - Untold Tales of Spider-Man '96
  - Untold Tales of Spider-Man '97
  - Untold Tales of Spider-Man: Strange Encounter #1 (1998)
  - Amazing Spider-Man Annual 37 B Story
- Web of Spider-Man #81–83 (1991)
- What If #13, 23, 26, 44, 46, 47, 60–62 (1990–1994)
- What The--?! #3–4, 8, 17 (1988–1992)
- Wonder Man Annual #1 (1992)

=== Topps Comics ===
- Jack Kirby's Silver Star #1 (1993)
- Jack Kirby's Teenagents #1–4 (1994)
- Satan's Six #4 (1993)
- Topps Comics Presents #0 (1993)
- Victory #1 (1994)

Preceded by Dennis O'Neil	Power Man and Iron Fist writer 1983–1984	Succeeded by Archie Goodwin
Preceded by n/a	Thunderbolts writer 1997–2000	Succeeded by Fabian Nicieza
Preceded by Walt Simonson	The Avengers writer 1998–2002	Succeeded by Geoff Johns
Preceded by Jim Lee and Jeph Loeb	Iron Man writer 1997–2000 (with Roger Stern in 1998–2000)	Succeeded by Joe Quesada
Preceded by John Arcudi	Aquaman writer 2006–2007	Succeeded by Tad Williams
Preceded by Greg Rucka and Geoff Johns	Superman writer 2006–2008 (with Geoff Johns in 2006)	Succeeded by James Robinson
