= Captain America: The Captain =

Captain America comic

- Cover of Captain America #350
- Publisher: Marvel Comics
- Publication date: August 1987 – February 1989
- Genre: Superhero
- Title(s): Captain America #332–350
- Main character(s): Captain America; Red Skull; John Walker; Diamondback; Falcon; Tony Stark; D-Man; Nomad; Flag-Smasher; Serpent Society; Battlestar

Creative team
- Writer: Mark Gruenwald
- Artist(s): Kieron Dwyer; Tom Morgan

"Captain America: The Captain", also known as "Captain America No More!", is a run of Captain America from issue 332 (cover dated Aug. 1987) to issue 350 (cover dated Feb. 1989), written by Mark Gruenwald. In this story arc, Steve Rogers (the original Captain America) temporarily gives up his superhero identity and is replaced by John Walker, before Rogers decides to return.

The first issue in the storyline (#332) invokes the classic comic book story Spider-Man No More! with the tagline "Captain America No More!" on the cover. (The actual name of the issue is "The Choice.")

The storyline also debuts the Commission on Superhuman Activities, which would continue to make many appearances over the years, including in the famous Civil War comics storyline.

== Plot ==
The Commission on Superhuman Activities charges Steve Rogers with decades of unpaid taxes, back-dated to his disappearance in action in 1945. They insist as repayment he serve them in an official capacity as Captain America. Uncertain over the legality of serving American foreign affairs, Steve spends a day considering the issue. Meanwhile, a terrorist known as Warhead parachutes onto the Washington Monument with a thermonuclear device, threatening to detonate it unless America goes to war. Witnessing this, John Walker, who has previously antagonized Rogers as the Super-Patriot, decides to get involved, hoping that dealing with the incident will grant him publicity. Walker's involvement ends with Warhead killing himself with a grenade. After considering his options, Rogers declares he cannot serve the US government as Captain America, and resigns the title, leaving behind his uniform and shield.

Having demonstrated himself, Walker is appointed as the new Captain America by the CSA, undergoing a period of training to sufficiently match Roger's combat prowess in the field. Lemar Hoskins, who had previously worked alongside Walker as one of the Bold Urban Commandoes, is allowed to serve as his partner, Bucky (Hoskins later takes the new name of "Battlestar", after readers wrote in to inform writer Mark Gruenwald that "Bucky" was a derogatory term for African-American men). The two remaining members of the commandoes, feeling slighted by Walker, attempt to blackmail him. In response, Walker and Hoskins attack them, resulting in a public brawl. When confronted by this by his superiors, Walker admits to his culpability, determined to live up to the image of Captain America. Walker's first mission is to deal with the ultra-conservative hate group the Watchdogs, where he is alarmed to find he agrees with many of their viewpoints.

Meanwhile, Steve Rogers goes on a driving tour of America, prompting the Falcon, Demolition Man, Nomad, and Vagabond to gather together to track him down. As they do, Rogers encounters the eco-terrorist Brother Nature. The encounter rekindles Rogers' desire to help others, and he takes on the new persona of "The Captain", wearing a red, white and black outfit based on his original one. Together, the heroes thwart a group of snake-themed villains from robbing a Las Vegas casino, though they are arrested by the police for vigilantism. While in custody, Sidewinder of the Serpent Society arrives to free and recruit the villains, succeeding despite Rogers' efforts. Elsewhere, Walker is sent on a mission to detain the villain Professor Power, but in a burst of rage beats the man to death.

After dealing with the mutant villain Famine, Rogers goes to Tony Stark to ask for a new shield, which Stark provides. Unbeknownst to Steve, Stark is in the middle of his own crusade (in the storyline Armor Wars), and is doing so partly to allay Rogers's suspicions. Rogers realizes what Stark is up to when he attacks the Guardsmen of the super-penitentiary the Vault, and the two fight. After dealing with a group of supervillains inadvertently released by Tony's actions, Steve returns the shield, his friendship with Stark damaged.

In Washington, D.C., Walker is publicly unveiled as the new Captain America, but the press conference is interrupted by Left-Winger and Right-Winger, his former assistants in the Bold Urban Commandoes, who reveal on live television his name and place of birth out of spite. Elsewhere, the terrorist Viper stages a take-over of the Serpent Society, with the supervillains the Captain had fought in Vegas as her agents. Diamondback escapes with Sidewinder, and goes to the Captain for assistance. Viper's plan turns out to be transforming the populace of Washington, D.C. into snake-human hybrids. Armed with a new shield of pure vibranium given to him by the Black Panther, the Captain travels to the White House to stop Viper's scheme, despite knowing the CSA will use this as an excuse to label him a criminal and terrorist. During this, D-Man and Nomad are arrested by Walker and Battlestar.

As a consequence of Left-Winger and Right-Winger's actions, the Watchdogs abduct Walker's parents in revenge. Ignoring the CSA's commands, Walker goes to attempt to negotiate their release, but in the confrontation his parents are shot dead; as a consequence Walker goes berserk and slaughters the Watchdogs. Elsewhere, an increasingly belligerent Nomad parts ways Rogers when he decides to surrender himself to the commission. The Commission covers up Walker's actions, as their president turns out to be answering to a mysterious figure who wishes for Walker to continue in the role. Traumatized by the death of his parents, an increasingly unhinged Walker seeks out Left-Winger and Right-Winger to kill them.

Unable to cover Walker's actions further, the commission votes to suspend him from duty, only to be overruled by the sudden arrival of the President, who also insists on Rogers's release in gratitude for thwarting Viper's plot. Meanwhile, Flag-Smasher, leader of the organization ULTIMATUM, fights against his own minions. Escaping to an Arctic research station, he takes hostages and demands to speak with Captain America. Walker is sent, but Flag-Smasher is incensed by the absence of the original Captain, and defeats Walker in combat. He allows Battlestar to leave with a warning that the world will be doomed in forty-eight hours time. Elsewhere, on the orders of the head commissioner's mysterious backer, Rogers is allowed to escape from confinement. Battlestar ignores orders from the commission, who give Walker up for dead, and seeks out Rogers to work together. With D-Man, they travel to the research station, where ULTIMATUM is in a battle with their founder. Confronting him and proving his identity, Rogers learns Flag-Smasher quit his army on learning it was being financed by Johann Schmidt, the Red Skull, despite the man having died in Captain America's arms some years previously. On Schmidt's orders, ULTIMATUM have built a doomsday device meant to disable all electronic equipment across the world. Allying with Flag-Smasher, Rogers and D-Man go to destroy the device, though D-Man is apparently killed in the attempt.

Returning to America, Rogers confronts the head commissioner, who is killed by a booby-trap using the Skull's "dust of death" in his phone. Walker is summoned to a meeting with the mysterious backer, who turns out to be identical to Steve Rogers, as well as behind the multiple organizations Walker has fought. The fake Rogers orders a group of these agents to kill Walker, but the latter defeats them all. Rogers makes his own way to the building, where he encounters Walker; they fight, with Rogers ultimately winning, at which point his doppelganger reveals himself as the Red Skull, restored to life in a clone of Rogers's body, and as the one who has been responsible for Rogers resigning, Walker's investiture, and the abduction and murder of the Walkers, all to discredit Captain America and the American government. As the villain gloats, just before preparing to hit Rogers with a dose of his dust of death hidden in his cigarette, Walker manages to strike him with his shield. This causes the Skull to get exposed to his own poison; while it does not kill him, it disfigures his head into a skull-like visage. Despite Roger's efforts, however, the Skull still manages to escape.

Afterward, the CSA apologize to Rogers, offering him the title of Captain America again. Rogers refuses, but as he leaves, Walker insists he take the title back, feeling unworthy of the ideals and expectations the role has placed on him, but also to prevent the Commission placing someone else in the role. Rogers agrees and becomes Captain America once again.

== Collected Editions ==
Captain America #332-350 were reprinted into several trade paperbacks along with Iron Man #228 under the title "Captain America: The Captain".

| Subtitle | Years covered | Issues collected | Pages | Publication date | ISBN |
|---|---|---|---|---|---|
| Captain America: The Captain | 1987–1989 | Captain America #332–350; Iron Man #228 | ??? | 2011 | 978-0-7851-4965-1 |
| Captain America Marvel Epic Collection 14: The Captain | 1987–1989 | Captain America #333–350, Iron Man #228 | 502 | July 27, 2021 | 978-1302930707 |

== In other media ==
- Captain America: Civil War teases some elements from "The Captain" when Steve Rogers refuses to sign the Sokovia Accords because he has more faith in his own judgment than that of the government. After his climactic battle with Iron Man, Rogers dropped the shield when Tony Stark taunts him for not being deserving of it, mirroring the events of Captain America No More. In the end of the film, Rogers breaks Falcon, Scarlet Witch, Hawkeye, and Ant-Man out of the Raft prison, and takes refuge in Wakanda.
- In Avengers: Infinity War, Steve Rogers receives new vibranium gauntlets from Shuri to replace his traditional shield instead of a new shield composed of pure vibranium like in the comics. Unlike in the comics, Rogers didn't wear a red, white & black costume. Rogers' allies in the film are Falcon, Scarlet Witch and Black Widow while Hawkeye and Ant-Man were in house arrest.
- In Avengers: Endgame, Tony Stark returns the shield to Steve Rogers. However, in the end of the film, an aged Rogers passes the shield and mantle to Sam Wilson.
- The miniseries The Falcon and the Winter Soldier is in part inspired by "The Captain," with John Walker taking on the mantle of Captain America before his recklessness and aggression leads to the mantle being stripped from him by the government.
