= Sentry (Curtis Elkins) =

- Sentry as depicted in Venom: Lethal Protector #2 (March 1993). Art by Greg Luzniak and Scott Koblish.

Publication information
- Publisher: Marvel Comics
- First appearance: Venom: Lethal Protector #2 (March, 1993)
- Created by: David Michelinie; Mark Bagley

In-story information
- Alter ego: Curtis Elkins
- Team affiliations: The Jury; The Vault
- Abilities: Wields armor that grants: Jet boots; Repulsor gun

Sentry (Curtis Elkins) is a fictional character appearing in American comic books published by Marvel Comics. The character has been depicted as a member of The Jury, in which he is a commanding officer.

== Fictional character biography ==
Curtis Elkins was a Guardsman at the Vault, a prison for super powered criminals. While there, Elkins befriended Hugh Taylor, a new guardsman fresh out of the army. Elkins left the Vault sometime after Hugh was murdered by Venom during an escape.

Elkins and a few of his fellow Guardsmen join the Jury, an agency organized by General Orwell Taylor to track down and destroy Venom for his part in killing Hugh Taylor, Orwell's eldest son. To this end, many of the Jury's members are armed with sonic and fire-generating weapons, which Venom is vulnerable to. After Orwell is arrested for his involvement in the Arachnis Project, his younger son Maxwell reforms the Jury to fit the principles of civil rights and Elkins' ideology of law and order.

== Powers and abilities ==
Sentry's armor and that of the other Jury members is based on that of the Guardsmen, with upgrades designed to aid in the fight against Venom. Sentry's armor gives him enhanced strength that enables him to hold down Spider-Man. He has flight technology with a ramjet propulsion mini engine installed in his boots. He also wields an energy gun and possesses a picklock tool kit inside his right glove.

== In other media ==
- Sentry appears in the X-Men: The Animated Series episode "One Man's Worth (Part 1)".
- Sentry appears as a boss in Venom/Spider-Man: Separation Anxiety.
