= XXXombies =

- Cover of the first issue. Art by Tony Moore; Kieron Dwyer

Publication information
- Publisher: Image Comics
- Schedule: Monthly
- Format: Limited series
- Genre
- Publication date: October 2007 – April 2008
- No. of issues: 4

Creative team
- Created by: Rick Remender; Kieron Dwyer; Tony Moore
- Written by: Rick Remender
- Artist: Kieron Dwyer
- Letterer: Rus Wooton
- Colorist: Lee Loughridge

Collected editions
- Crawl Space: XXXombies: ISBN 1-58240-913-7

XXXombies is a four-issue comic book mini-series written by Rick Remender, with art by Kieron Dwyer. It is the first series for Crawl Space, a line of horror comic books distributed by Image Comics. The first issue was released on October 24, 2007, one week away from Halloween that year.

== Plot ==
In 1977, a zombie-infected plane returning from Haiti crashes into the Hollywood sign, starting an infestation through the city. Meanwhile, a sleazy adult-film producer by the name of Wong Hung Lau plans to film various pornographic movies in a sole weekend with the hopes of earning enough money quickly to pay a large debt he has with the Italian mafia. His plans soon fall apart when one of the performers gets turned into a zombie and Lau has to run, along with his film crew and the surviving actresses.

Among them is Jenny, a promiscuous but naive girl whose father, Steve Mitchum, just arrived to Los Angeles looking for her. Steve is an expert in the use of weapons and fireguns, and not even the apocalypse would stand on his way.

As Lau's group tries to survive the horrors of a city overrun by vicious zombies, a group of mobsters tracks them, looking for their payment at first, and later vengeance, even taking Jenny's former pimp as a guide/hostage.

Steve and the criminals both find what's left of the crew (Jenny, other two actresses and a rookie sound engineer) at the same time, who were engaged in an "end-of-the-world orgy". Jenny's friends are killed but the crime boss wants the father and daughter to suffer before they die, so orders his goons to rape them both. A discussion between the boss and a homophobic underling allows the zombified sound engineer to rise up and attack them, which in turn allows Steve to kill their captors (and Jenny to kill her pimp) and escape.

The comic then flashforwards to some time later. Wong Hun Lau (who escaped prior to the encounter with the mobsters) was living a luxurious life by prostituting zombified celebrities, when a truck makes a quick stop in his mansion. Their occupants are Jenny and Steve, who unceremoniously kill Lau with a shotgun blast and drive off.

== Characters ==
- Wong Hung Lau - Chinese adult film director
- Steve Mitchum - truck driver and survivalist

== Collected editions ==
The series has been collected into a trade paperback:

- Crawl Space: XXXombies (96 pages, Image Comics, June 2008, ISBN 1-58240-913-7)

== Film adaptation ==
Rick Remender has said that he and Dwyer are working on a XXXombie screenplay.

== See also ==
- Fear Agent
- Sea of Red
