= Night Mary =

Horror comic book

Publication information
- Publisher: IDW Publishing
- Schedule: Monthly
- Format: Limited series
- Genre: Horror
- Publication date: July – November 2005
- No. of issues: 5

Creative team
- Written by: Rick Remender
- Artist: Kieron Dwyer
- Letterer: Tom B. Long
- Colorist: Kieron Dwyer
- Editor: Chris Ryall

Collected editions
- Night Mary: ISBN 1-933239-27-1

Night Mary is a horror comic book limited series published by American company IDW Publishing in 2005, created by Rick Remender and Kieron Dwyer.

== Plot ==
The series focused on the character of Mary Specter, a 17-year-old girl trained by her father, who owns a sleep disorder clinic, to enter the dreams of others. The plot revolves around her interactions with the dreams of a serial killer.

== Collected editions ==
- Night Mary (collects #1-5, 120 pages, 2006, ISBN 1-933239-27-1)

== Film adaptation ==
In July 2009, Animal Logic has picked up film rights to IDW Publishing's graphic novel.
