= Super-Patriot =

Super-Patriot may refer to:

- Super-Patriot, several Marvel Comics characters:
  - Patric List, an alias given by the original Super-Patriot
  - John Walker, now known under the moniker of U.S. Agent
  - Kate Walker, the sister of John Walker
- SuperPatriot, an Image Comics character created by Erik Larsen
