= Super-Patriot (Marvel Comics) =

- Panel from Nick Fury, Agent of S.H.I.E.L.D. #13 (July 1969). Pencils by Herb Trimpe, inks by Sam Grainger.

Publication information
- Publisher: Marvel Comics
- First appearance: Nick Fury, Agent of S.H.I.E.L.D. #13 (July 1969).
- Created by: Gary Friedrich; Herb Trimpe

In-story information
- Alter ego: John Walker; Mike Farrell
- Abilities: None, although has access to various high-tech weapons.

Super-Patriot is a name used by three characters in the universe of Marvel Comics. The first was an enemy of Nick Fury and S.H.I.E.L.D. The second was John Walker, who used the name Super-Patriot as a rival to Captain America. When Steve Rogers gave up the role of Captain America, Walker was tapped by the Commission on Superhuman Activities to replace Rogers; Walker later adopted the moniker U.S. Agent after Rogers' return. The third person to use the alias was Mike Farrell, a former neighbor of Steve Rogers. He became Super-Patriot and allied himself with Dead Ringer, a mutant villain with shapeshifting abilities.

== Fictional character biography ==
=== Patric List ===
The Super-Patriot, alias Patric List, is introduced staging a political rally in New York City, protesting the immigration policies of the United States. His speech labels American officials who allow foreigners on American soil as "traitors", and encourages American citizens to overthrow the government. Agents of the anti-terrorist organization S.H.I.E.L.D. arrive to arrest Super-Patriot for his refusal of a federal subpoena, but he manages to escape.

Nick Fury, then a fugitive on the run from S.H.I.E.L.D., is informed that Super-Patriot is planning a terrorist attack on the United Nations. Fury arrives at the United Nations Headquarters as Super-Patriot is about to destroy it with his "Ultimate Weapon". S.H.I.E.L.D. shows up and a three-way battle erupts. Super-Patriot attempts to flee, clutching an American flag to his body (believing that the S.H.I.E.L.D. agents will not fire at the flag). However, he accidentally trips over the flag and falls to his death.

=== John Walker ===
John Walker is introduced as the second Super-Patriot before taking on the mantle of Captain America following Steve Rogers' resignation. He is apparently killed by the Scourge of the Underworld, but is later revealed to have survived. His death was faked as part of a conspiracy enacted by the government, who gave him Steve Rogers' uniform and the new identity of Jack Daniels.

=== Mike Farrell ===
The third Super-Patriot, Mike Farrell was created in Captain America #237 by Chris Claremont, Roger McKenzie and Sal Buscema.

Mike Farrell is a former firefighter who joins the Watchdogs, but soon leaves the group due to his guilt over the death of a janitor in a building he and other members of the Watchdogs burned down. Farrell is kidnapped by the Watchdogs, but is rescued by Captain America and U.S. Agent along with the group's other captives. Farrell turns himself in, insisting he be punished for his involvement with the Watchdogs.

Farrell later begins blaming Captain America for all the problems he had suffered in his life and works with the mutant Dead-Ringer to destroy Captain America's reputation. Dead-Ringer would use his mutant power of mimicry to appear as various supervillains while Farrell would dress as Captain America and fight the villains, causing collateral damage. Farrell also assumes the identity of Super-Patriot, intending to appear superior to Captain America in staged public fights. After a long cat-and-mouse game with Captain America, Farrell is accidentally killed by Dead-Ringer.

== Reception ==
Neal Curtis wrote that the character's 1987 story was "an excellent example of the way Marvel constantly negotiates competing visions of America". He further notes that "despite his passionate love for his country, Walker’s dogmatic belief in America first, together with his own involvement with a campaign of retribution and revenge, shows him to be wholly unfit to assume the mantle." He also commented on the earlier 1969 story, noting that the first incarnation of this character "was an explicit racist who promoted anti-immigration policies and then met his end when he tripped himself up on an American flag he had draped himself in and fell to his death", which portrayed the author's message that American ideals are opposed to "this advocate of exclusionary nationhood".

== See also ==
- Patriot (Marvel Comics)
