= Battlestar (character) =

Marvel Comics superhero

- Battlestar in Civil War Frontline #3. Art by Ramon Sachs.

Publication information
- Publisher: Marvel Comics
- First appearance: As unnamed man: Captain America #323 (November 1986); As Lemar Hoskins: Captain America #333 (September 1987); As Bucky: Captain America #334 (October 1987); As Battlestar: Captain America #341 (May 1988)
- Created by: Mark Gruenwald; Paul Neary

In-story information
- Alter ego: Lemar Hoskins
- Species: Human mutate
- Team affiliations: Bold Urban Commandos; CSA; Wild Pack; U.S. Army
- Partnerships: U.S. Agent
- Notable aliases: Bucky
- Abilities: Superhuman strength, agility, stamina, durability, and reflexes; Peak-level speed, dexterity, coordination and balance; Use of nearly indestructible shield and firearms; Exceptional hand-to-hand combatant; Highly trained acrobat and gymnast

Battlestar (Lemar Hoskins) is a superhero appearing in American comic books published by Marvel Comics. Created by Mark Gruenwald and Paul Neary, the character made his first appearance in Captain America #323 (1986). He became the fifth character to assume the alias Bucky before taking on the name "Battlestar."

Clé Bennett portrayed the character in the Marvel Cinematic Universe television series The Falcon and the Winter Soldier (2021).

== Publication history ==
Battlestar was created by Mark Gruenwald and Paul Neary, and was introduced as a nameless member of the Bold Urban Commandos in Captain America #323 (1986). In Captain America #327, he is called "Lemar" for the first time, but generally is still treated as interchangeable with the other BUCs. He rises from anonymity in Captain America #334, in which his full name is revealed and he adopts the identity of Bucky. Gruenwald later explained:

I get several letters every month asking when Bucky's coming back. And I said, "Well, if the government's getting a new Captain America, maybe they'd want to get a new Bucky." I had previously introduced three Buckies as the friends and partners of the Super-Patriot, the Bold Urban Commandos, and rather than create someone new, I decided one of them would be the Bucky. There were two white guys and a black guy, and I said why not the black guy. He at least stood out in the group. Cap had a black partner before in the Falcon, but he's had three other white partners so I said it's time for another black one. Thus, Bucky was black. Now I'm getting a lot of bad mail, and deservedly so, for my ignorance.

Writer Dwayne McDuffie informed Gruenwald that "Buck" is considered a derogatory term among African-Americans, as it was a term used before the American Civil War to refer to male slaves, and said that it was also racially offensive to have an adult black man taking on the identity of a teenage sidekick. Writer Mark Gruenwald had not known of the racial connotation of "Bucky", having grown up in a region with few African-Americans residents, and worked with McDuffie to create a story to address the problem and give Hoskins a new name.

In Captain America #341 he is renamed Battlestar, dons his own unique costume, and is more explicitly presented as a partner to the new Captain America, rather than a sidekick. Gruenwald recalled, "The search for a good name for a partner to Cap is a whole half-hour unto itself. [laughs] We came up with every single name which was vaguely patriotic, vaguely military, and yet stood on its own, because some day these guys may split up." The name "Battlestar" was suggested by Captain America penciler Kieron Dwyer.

== Fictional character biography ==
Lemar Hoskins was born in Chicago, Illinois. Along with his Army friends John Walker, Hector Lennox, and Jerome Johnson, he is given superhuman attributes by Karl Malus on behalf of the Power Broker, and they become wrestlers. The four later form the Bold Urban Commandos (also known as the "BUCkies"), and are employed by John Walker, known as the Super-Patriot. The Buckies stage a fake attack on the Super-Patriot for publicity. As a BUCky, Hoskins also attacks a group of foreign students.

When the Commission on Superhuman Activities selects Walker to replace Steve Rogers as Captain America, Hoskins is the only one in his group allowed to accompany Walker. He takes the identity of Bucky (after Rogers' original partner Bucky Barnes) and undergoes a rigorous training under the supervision of the Commission. Walker and Hoskins go undercover on a mission to stop the Watchdogs.

Hoskins, who is African American, is persuaded by another black man that "Bucky" is a demeaning title, since American slaveholders often referred to male slaves as "bucks." Consequently, Hoskins takes on the identity of Battlestar, wearing a new costume and wielding a shield patterned after the one Steve Rogers originally carried. Battlestar witnesses the faked assassination of Walker and leaves the Commission's employ. He confronts Valerie Cooper and learns that Walker is still alive.

When Steve Rogers resumes the identity of Captain America, Battlestar leaves federal employment and returns to his native Chicago. He becomes a member of Silver Sable's Wild Pack for some time. When Ernst Sablinova, Sable's father, wants the Pack to murder a captive, Battlestar disobeys.

During the "Civil War" storyline, Battlestar allies himself with many opposed to the Superhuman Registration Act. During a visit by reporter Sally Floyd, S.H.I.E.L.D. agents operating alongside Iron Man attack and capture many of the group. Floyd and a few others escape. Battlestar suffers a back injury during the battle and due to an oversight, does not receive proper medical care while in custody. He is freed by Captain America's forces and takes part in the final battle, despite his injuries.

Battlestar participates in an Unlimited Class Wrestling Federation (UCWF) match against D-Man as part of a charity event. It is revealed that prior to becoming a superhero, Lemar Hoskins was an aspiring wrestler whose career was ended by D-Man. The charity fight ends when it is revealed that the current head of the UCWF is trying to abscond with the money raised by the event, and the two heroes team up to stop the robbery.

== Powers and abilities ==
As a result of the experimental mutagenic augmentation process conducted on him by Dr. Karl Malus on behalf of the Power Broker, Hoskins has superhuman strength (capable of lifting 10 tons under maximum exertion), agility, reflexes, and endurance. His speed, dexterity, coordination, and balance are of the order of an Olympic athlete.

Battlestar is adept at hand-to-hand combat and trained in gymnastics and acrobatics. Battlestar is also a seasoned combat veteran with tactical leadership experience earned with the Wild Pack. He is proficient in the use of conventional firearms.

He carries a near indestructible blunt-end triangular adamantium shield in combat, and is capable of using it defensively against kinetic and energy based attacks, and offensively as a thrown weapon. Due to his superhuman strength, it is potentially a lethal weapon.

== Reception ==
=== Accolades ===
- In 2021, Screen Rant included Battlestar in their "10 Most Powerful Alternate Versions Of Bucky In Marvel Comics" list and in their "Marvel Comics: 10 Strongest Shield Wielding Characters (Who Aren't Steve Rogers)" list.

== In other media ==
- Battlestar makes a non-speaking appearance in the Spider-Man (1994) five-part episode "Six Forgotten Warriors" as a member of the Wild Pack.
- Battlestar makes a non-speaking appearance in the Spider-Man (2017) episode "Take Two" as a member of the Wild Pack.
- Lemar Hoskins / Battlestar appears in The Falcon and the Winter Soldier, portrayed by Clé Bennett. This version works for the U.S. Army and is a friend and partner of John Walker who is later accidentally killed by Karli Morgenthau.
