= The Jury (comics) =

Fictional vigilantes in the Marvel Comics universe

Jury
- Jury. Art by Mark Bagley

Publication information
- Publisher: Marvel Comics
- First appearance: Venom: Lethal Protector #2 (March 1993)
- Created by: David Michelinie; Mark Bagley

In-story information
- Member(s): Bomblast; Firearm; Ramshot; Screech; Sentry; U.S. Agent; Wysper

The Jury is a fictional group of armored vigilantes appearing in American comic books published by Marvel Comics. The team was first introduced in Venom: Lethal Protector #2 (March 1993), and were created by David Michelinie and Mark Bagley.

== Fictional team history ==
The Jury was originally conceived and financed by General Orwell Taylor, with Sentry (Curtis Elkins), Ramshot (Samuel Caulkin), Screech (Maxwell Taylor), Firearm and Bomblast (Kenneth Parmenter) as the armored vigilantes. After his oldest son Hugh Taylor, a guard at the prison for super powered criminals known as The Vault, is killed by Venom in an attempt to escape, a vengeful Orwell gathers together Hugh's friends: Elkins, a co-worker and friend; Caulkin is an army buddy of Hugh's; Maxwell, Hugh's younger brother; and Firearm and Bomblast, Hugh's co-workers. Orwell provides his five employees with costumes based on the Guardsman armors which were outfitted with sonics and fire, both of which are anathema to Venom and the other symbiotes.

The team's first mission is an attempt to destroy Venom that ends in failure. Later, they legally rent spots on multiple New York City rooftops and use sensory equipment to scan for Spider-Man. This does not meet with the expected success, as there are multiple superheroes that operate high above the city streets. Spider-Man figures out their plan and manages to ambush one of the Jury's maintenance men. The man stands up to Spider-Man, encouraging the superhero to take him to the police, as the equipment is all legal.

Unsure what to do about the entire situation, Spider-Man intentionally baits one of the sensors, drawing the entire team out into a fight. Ramshot is unsure about kidnapping Spider-Man and is ordered back to base. Spider-Man is defeated by the remaining members, and is drugged and tried for his part in originally bringing the Venom symbiote to Earth.

Witnesses are present to testify about Venom's crimes. One is a woman whose child has been traumatized after witnessing Venom's monstrous form; Venom had been trying to protect the girl from what he thought was a dangerous stranger. This trial is part of a plan designed to guilt Spider-Man into helping the team steal a government designed weapon capable of slaying Venom.

=== Paranoia ===
Gavel, the judge for the Jury's trials. Art by John Calimee.

After some time, Orwell seems to lose sight of his original goals and begins making shady deals with the Life Foundation (of which he is a shareholder), thus relegating the Jury to act as bodyguards for the Foundation's clientele in their bunkers. Orwell begins to become paranoid that his team is against him, and ultimately abandons them to die at the hands of Carlton Drake as a Man-Spider. Taylor and Roland Treece are later arrested by federal agents after trying to flee the Life Foundation.

Eventually, the Jury breaks from Orwell and reinvent themselves. Maxwell gives up his Screech identity and chooses to redesign the Jury and set himself up as the defense lawyer in the Jury's trials of criminals. A mysterious hooded man named Gavel is assigned to be the judge for all their trials, while . Gavel is not an actual member of the Jury, and he only serves to deliver the verdict, always via a transmission from a secret location. A lawyer named Olivia Lentz is recruited to serve as the prosecutor for their trials. Finally, the Jury recruits Jennifer Stewart, a former Guardsman whose husband Ryan was killed during a riot at the Vault. Stewart takes the codename Wysper and Screech's place in the team. At this time, the Jury operates out of a secret location outside of the United States. They also have a base in southern California located in the office of a shell company named Equity Inc., which supposedly makes office furniture. For transport, the Jury uses a flying ship called the Justifier. Their briefing room is called "The Box".

Shortly after recruiting Wysper, the Jury invades the small country of Boca Del Dios and freeds Tarantula (Luis Alvarez) from a prison guarded by robotic dreadnaughts. The Jury tries Tarantula and after presenting testimony he is convicted. Tarantula tries to escape and is told by Gavel that if he kills Wysper, he would be free to go. Tarantula and Wysper battle, and the latter is unsure she could kill Tarantula until she is informed by Gavel that Tarantula was the one who murdered her husband Ryan during the riot at The Vault. Wysper snaps Tarantula's neck and is officially made a member of the Jury.

=== Hybrid ===
Edwin Cord. Art by Mark Bagley

The Jury later tracks down Scott Washington, aka Hybrid, a former Guardsman who was bonded to a symbiote that is in fact a gestalt of four symbiotes. The Jury fails to kill Hybrid due to the intervention of Hybrid's friends the New Warriors. After a fight that both sides confess got out of hand, all present are convinced that Scott can control the symbiote; he had used pleasant memories of his times with his old Vault colleagues to calm the entity.

Some time after these events, the Jury lose their funding and hit hard times. They are forced to be hired goons yet again, this time working for Edwin Cord. U.S. Agent is made their leader. The Jury is sent after the Thunderbolts, who have recently been revealed to be the Masters of Evil. The Jury is defeated by the Thunderbolts and their new leader Hawkeye. Weeks later, The Jury is ordered not to go into battle with Graviton and the Thunderbolts by Cord, who has no desire to waste resources in battles in which he has nothing to gain personally. The U.S. Agent and the Jury would sometime later go against Cord's mandate and help the Thunderbolts fight the new Secret Empire.

Later, the Jury fights the New Thunderbolts, and are defeated easily by Songbird.

== Members ==
- Bomblast (Kenneth Parmenter)
- Firearm (real name unknown)
- Ramshot (Samuel Caulkin)
- Screech (Maxwell "Max" Taylor)
- Sentry (Curtis Elkins)
- U.S. Agent (assigned to lead the group)
- Wysper (Jennifer Stewart)

== Support staff ==
- Edwin Cord (financier)
- Gavel (judge for their trials, real name unknown)
- Olivia Lentz (prosecutor for their trials)
- General Orwell Taylor (founder and original financier)
- Ms. Santiago (monitored motion detectors for Orwell)
- Ms. Bronson (monitored motion detectors for Orwell)

== In other media ==
The Jury appears in Venom/Spider-Man: Separation Anxiety.
