= Sea of Red =

American comic book series

- Cover of the first issue

Publication information
- Publisher: Image Comics
- Schedule: Monthly
- Format: Ongoing series
- Genre: Swashbuckler; Vampire
- Publication date: March 2005 – November 2006
- No. of issues: 13

Creative team
- Created by: Rick Remender; Salgood Sam
- Written by: Rick Remender; Kieron Dwyer
- Penciller(s): Salgood Sam; Paul Harmon; Francesco Francavilla
- Inker(s): Salgood Sam; Paul Harmon
- Letterer: Ed Dukeshire
- Colorist(s): Salgood Sam; Paul Harmon

Collected editions
- No Grave But the Sea: ISBN 1-58240-537-9
- No Quarter: ISBN 1582405417
- The Deadlights: ISBN 1582406669

Sea of Red is an American comic book series published from 2005 to 2006 by Image Comics. Featuring 16th century vampire pirates, the series was written by Rick Remender and Kieron Dwyer and drawn by Salgood Sam and Paul Harmon.

== Collected editions ==
The series has been collected into trade paperbacks:

- No Grave But the Sea (collects #1-4, 104 pages, September 2005, ISBN 1-58240-537-9, December 2006, ISBN 1-58240-665-0)
- No Quarter (collects #5-8, 104 pages, March 2006, ISBN 1-58240-541-7)
- The Deadlights (collects #9-13, 120 pages, December 2007, ISBN 1-58240-666-9)

A limited edition hardcover slipcase collection of the three trade paperbacks was released in May 2010.
