= U.S. Agent =

Comic book character

- John Walker as the U.S. Agent. Taken from the cover of Captain America Corps #3 (August 2011). Art by Phil Jimenez.

Publication information
- Publisher: Marvel Comics
- First appearance: As Super-Patriot: Captain America #323 (November 1986); As Captain America: Captain America #333 (September 1987); As U.S. Agent: Captain America #354 (June 1989)
- Created by: Mark Gruenwald; Paul Neary

In-story information
- Alter ego: John F. Walker
- Species: Human mutate
- Team affiliations: Mighty Avengers; Omega Flight; New Invaders; S.T.A.R.S. The Jury; Force Works; Secret Defenders; West Coast Avengers; Dark Avengers; Commission on Superhuman Activities; Avengers; Thunderbolts; Astonishing Avengers
- Partnerships: Battlestar
- Notable aliases: Jack Daniels; Super-Patriot; Captain America
- Abilities: Superhuman strength, agility, stamina, durability, and reflexes; Peak-level speed, dexterity, coordination and balance; Use of nearly indestructible shield and firearms; Exceptional hand-to-hand combatant; Highly trained acrobat and gymnast

U.S. Agent (John Walker) is a character appearing in American comic books published by Marvel Comics, usually those starring Captain America and the Avengers. Created by Mark Gruenwald and Paul Neary, the character first appeared in Captain America #323 (November 1986) as Super-Patriot. He was later redesigned as an incarnation of Captain America and a few years later, as U.S. Agent.

Wyatt Russell portrays John Walker in the Marvel Cinematic Universe, starting with the streaming television series The Falcon and the Winter Soldier (2021) and the film Thunderbolts* (2025). He will reprise the role in Avengers: Doomsday (2026).

== Publication history ==
The character of John Walker was first introduced as the antagonistic Super-Patriot in Captain America #323 (November 1986). Mark Gruenwald created Walker to counter the general message in Captain America of patriotism being invariably good, describing him as someone "who embodied patriotism in a way that Captain America didn't—a patriotic villain." He said, "Basically, I just wanted to do the opposite of Steve Rogers. Okay, Steve Rogers is a poor northern urban boy. So I'll make a guy from rural middle-class south. Cap is now old, so this guy'll be a real young up-and-comer. Cap has lofty ideals, so I'll make Super-Patriot be more realistic and more pragmatic. So, I put together his background and character traits by playing the opposite game."

This character is the second Super-Patriot character in the Marvel Universe. The first Super-Patriot debuted in Nick Fury: Agent of S.H.I.E.L.D. #13 in July 1969 and never appeared again. The original Super-Patriot's costume bears no resemblance to that used by John Walker.

After a return appearance in Captain America #327, Gruenwald reintroduced the character as the new Captain America in Captain America #333. Though Gruenwald said he would not have done this if it had not been a logical development from the preceding storylines, he also openly acknowledged that the motivating reason for replacing Steve Rogers as Captain America was to boost sales:

With Iron Man, for example, we had James Rhodes take the lead character's place, and we did it for two years—which I'm sure was about a year and a half longer than anybody thought we would do it. In Thor we had Beta Ray Bill take Thor's place for two or three issues. So, this is the sort of thing that has been done to shake up people before. You know, I'm responsible for it in Iron Man and I was editor of Thor at the time of Beta Ray Bill, and believe me it's a trick I know works because I've seen it work a number of times. It's just to get you noticed so that people who don't normally read it will say, "Oh, I heard something about this, let me read it and see." And with luck, folks will get hooked on the storyline.

In having Steve Rogers quit as Captain America and John Walker take over the role, Gruenwald stated that he was hoping to "better define what Captain America the concept is by seeing someone groping, trying to live up to it, trying to grasp all the facets of the concept". Walker soon developed a following of his own, with Gruenwald admitting that his best selling cover of the comic was #321 which had an image of Captain America shooting a firearm, and that this resulted in many fans wanted him to "Rambo-ize" Cap and make him more Punisher or Wolverine-like. Gruenwald considered this a violation of the character's principles, so he decided that he would give the fans what they wanted but that it could not be Steve Rogers. Walker's popularity as a character continued to grow, with Gruenwald stating that he had letters from readers saying that they did not want Steve Rogers to ever return as they saw Walker - regardless of his faults - as more viable, younger, and more interesting because they did not know what he would do next.

John Walker's installation as Captain America indeed provided a major boost to the series's sales, and he remained the main character of Captain America for issues 333 through 350, during which his character generally became more heroic. In Captain America #354 (June 1989) he was given another name and costume change, this time as U.S. Agent (created by writer Mark Gruenwald and artist Kieron Dwyer) using a discarded costume of Steve Rogers (the original Captain America): a black outfit with a different alignment of the stars and stripes to differentiate it from Steve Rogers' suit.

Like some West Coast Avengers teammates who had their own series (such as Iron Man, or Hawkeye in Solo Avengers), the character U.S. Agent was popular enough to support his own limited series in 1993. The mini-series was used to finish off a long-standing Marvel Universe plot thread involving the Scourge of the Underworld.

During the events of the "Maximum Security" storyline, U.S. Agent was given a new uniform reminiscent of riot police uniforms. He continued to use that uniform in his 2001 miniseries, which followed the events in "Maximum Security" and was written and drawn by Jerry Ordway.

=== "American Zealot" ===
In August 2020, Marvel announced that U.S. Agent would be getting a five-issue mini-series to be released in November that year, written by Christopher Priest and illustrated by Stefano Landini.

Priest described the story—titled "American Zealot"—as "a morality play in five acts". He continued:

John Walker has been fired. Or he quit. Depends on whos [sic] telling the story. Now finding his way as a civilian government contractor, Walker is making more money and taking more risks as he can now venture into places sanctioned agents cannot always follow. However, with limited official access to intelligence data, the now-former USAgent’s missions can and often do lead him into blind alleys he’ll need to MacGyver himself out of. ...

I was thrilled to be invited back to Captain America until I realized it was this guy, Cap’s scowling, emotionally damaged misfit cousin. Cousin America. But USAGENT presents an exciting writer’s challenge to explore the myriad expressions and aspirations of the American dream, how that dream is fulfilled or not, through the eyes and voices of a nation often at war with itself. John Walker is a man often at war with HIMself, so Marvel knows no better a protagonist for this journey, this stumble, this Parkour carom through the many visions of the greatest nation on Earth.

== Fictional character biography ==
=== Origin ===
John Walker was born in the fictional town of Custer's Grove, Georgia. He grew up idolizing his older brother, Mike, a helicopter pilot who died in the Vietnam War in 1974. John wanted to live up to Mike's memory, who was idolized by their parents, and so he later enlisted in the military. John served at Fort Bragg, but only served during peacetime and thus never became the hero that he perceived Mike to have been.

After John received an honorable discharge from the United States Army, he was told by a friend about the Power Broker, a mysterious individual who gave people superhuman abilities. Walker and his friend received treatments that granted them superhuman abilities.

=== Super-Patriot ===
John Walker as Super-Patriot. Cover of Captain America #327 (March 1987). Art by Mike Zeck and Bob McLeod.

Walker, now in debt to the Power Broker, intends to join the Unlimited Class Wrestling Federation but meets Ethan Thurm who becomes his manager and persuades Walker to become a hero instead. Thurm secures financial backing, helps Walker design a costume, and sets out a strategy that allows him to debut as the corporate-sponsored Super-Patriot who then travels the country promoting his image to the nation through patriotic rallies and community service.

At a rally in Central Park, he holds a secretly rehearsed performance in which he publicly criticizes Captain America and is subsequently attacked by three extremist supporters called the Bold Urban Commandos or "Buckies". Walker defeats the Buckies in the staged fight as a demonstration of his combat prowess and patriotism. Steve Rogers confronts Walker privately afterwards and demands that he stop using the Buckies, since people attending the rally could have been hurt in a panic resulting from the staged attack. Walker refuses, arguing that his actions are justified by his quest to replace the outdated Captain America as the nation's symbol.

When Captain America repeatedly refuses his challenges to a fight, Super-Patriot attacks Captain America. Although Captain America proves to be a more skilled fighter and lands blow after blow, the trash-talking Walker manages to absorb the attacks. With neither man falling after a lengthy brawl, Super-Patriot flings a number of throwing stars at Captain America who is too tired to dodge. One hits in the chest, embedding into Captain America's uniform but doing little to no actual physical damage. With the successful strike, the gleeful Super-Patriot claims victory and promptly departs. The weary and dejected Captain America tries to tell himself that the fight was a draw, as neither man actually went down but is nonetheless left questioning his own fighting abilities while acknowledging Super-Patriot's superior strength and stamina.

Walker catches the eye of the nation though when he tackles the terrorist Warhead who threatens to detonate a nuclear weapon in Washington, D.C. atop the Washington Monument. Walker scales the monument, disarming Warhead with a throwing star, before sending Warhead plummeting to the ground below. Warhead—preferring to go out 'like a man'—kills himself before hitting the ground by detonating a hand grenade.

This high-profile act makes him an instant celebrity, appearing in The Washington Post and on national television where he claims himself to be "America's future", which in turn brings him to the attention of Valerie Cooper in her role as a Presidential advisor.

=== Captain America ===
Soon after, Steve Rogers abandons Captain America's costume and identity when ordered to report directly to the Commission on Superhuman Activities, feeling that Captain America had grown beyond the name's original role as a symbol of America during the war and not wanting to be tied down to a political agenda. The Commission debates who should be the new Captain America, with Nick Fury and Sam Wilson both being considered as candidates, although it was considered that the former was too old and would not want to give up the autonomy enjoyed as Director of S.H.I.E.L.D., where as in the case of the latter they did not believe that the United States was ready for a Black equivalent.

Valerie Cooper, a member of the Commission, suggests that Walker should be made the new Captain America as a U.S. government operative. Though repulsed by the notion of giving up being Super-Patriot and taking on the Captain America identity he has criticized so much, Walker ultimately answers, "Ma'am, if Uncle Sam wanted me to be Mickey Mouse, I'd do it." As Captain America, he is forced to abandon Thrum as his manager, and can only retain Lemar Hoskins, one of the Buckies, since the other two failed to pass background checks.

Walker is partnered with Hoskins as the new Bucky, but Hoskins later changes the codename to "Battlestar" due to the negative racial name connotations for a Black man. The two follow Adrian Sammish's orders. Walker is trained by the Freedom Force, the Guardsmen, and the Taskmaster —Taskmaster's training focusing on teaching him how to use Captain America's shield — and goes on his first mission against the Watchdogs militia group.

Another of Walker's early acts as Captain America was a mission to "aid stability and democracy in South America" by teaming up with Tarantula to hunt escaped political dissidents from Delvadia. Despite believing in the fight against Communism and in the principle of helping America's "Democratic allies in Latin America", Walker becomes increasingly uncomfortable with the methods used by Tarantula after he interrogates and threatens occupants of an immigration detention center for information on his targets. The two battle and wound Spider-Man. Walker – increasingly conflicted by the fact that both the immigrants who Tarantula interrogated, and Spider-Man looked upon him and the uniform he wore with fear, seeing him as an enemy – decides to walk away, convincing himself that this course of action was not something that Captain America would support. Spider-Man ultimately defeats Tarantula, and Walker later learns that the individual who gave him his orders to help Tarantula was a rogue agent who did so without legal authority, beating him and telling him that the uniform he wears is supposed to inspire, not terrify.

Although Walker finds himself trying to emulate Rogers's ethics, Walker is more brutal than his predecessor due to his reactionary points of view. His superhuman strength and lack of emotional control lead him to inadvertently beat Professor Power to death. as well as badly injure the Resistants.

Left-Winger and Right-Winger, the two rejected Buckies, crash the press conference arranged by Valerie Cooper to reveal the "new" Captain America and Battlestar, and announce Walker's name and birthplace on national television. His parents are subsequently killed by the Watchdogs, driving Walker to a near mental breakdown. In a state of rage, he kills many of the Watchdogs, then beats Left-Winger and Right-Winger and leaves the two to die in an explosion. Left-Winger and Right-Winger survive, but are left terribly burned and in critical condition.

The Red Skull, inhabiting in a clone body of Steve Rogers, lures Walker to Washington, D.C. The Red Skull attacks Walker with a group of Walker's enemies, but Walker kills or critically injures these agents in a single brawl. The Red Skull arranges for Walker to confront Rogers — now using "the Captain" identity and costume — but Rogers defeats him and confronts the Red Skull. Walker wakes up and throws his shield at the Red Skull, causing the latter to be exposed to his own "dust of death". The exposure restores Red Skull's traditional skull-faced appearance. Rogers and Walker give a report to the Commission, which returns the Captain America uniform to Rogers. Rogers declines the offer, but Walker persuades Rogers to reconsider and accept it. At a press conference announcing the original Captain America's return, General Haywerth fakes Walker's assassination by a Watchdog in order to set up Walker in a new identity.

Walker is hypnotized into believing his parents are still alive, and he would not recover his full memory for many years. He is also given a new cover identity of "Jack Daniels" as well as speech therapy and work to erase old mannerisms in order to help hide the fact that he was the man the public had recently seen "assassinated".

=== U.S. Agent/West Coast Avengers ===
Walker soon resurfaced as U.S. Agent, wearing a variation of the Captain costume and using the vibranium disc as a shield. Walker continued to work for the Commission. He was first seen as the U.S. Agent, battling an Iron Monger as a test for the Commission. He was placed as a watchdog of West Coast Avengers and Vision by the Commission, as a condition to possibly get their government clearance reinstated. Some time later, he rescued Battlestar from the Power Broker, and reconciled with the former; Walker learned that his memories had been altered and that his parents were dead.

The manner of his appointment to the West Coast Avengers team, and his own abrasive attitude, saw U.S. Agent frequently come into conflict with his colleagues, in particular the headstrong Hawkeye (Clint Barton), which culminated in a battle between the two that saw both suspended. He later almost killed Spider-Woman (Julia Carpenter) – an ex-employee of U.S. Agent's former employers – hesitating over delivering the fatal blow before collapsing in grief, with his guilt over his long history of violence catching up with him.

While under the employ of the Commission for Superhuman Activities, U.S. Agent is tasked with taking down the Punisher. After locating the Punisher and engaging him in hand-to-hand combat, the Punisher disclosed he is attempting to take down the Maggia. U.S. Agent agrees to help the Punisher, vowing to take him into custody afterwards. U.S. Agent takes down the mercenary Paladin, who had been employed by the Maggia to kill the Punisher. The Punisher escapes after faking his death.

U.S. Agent investigates the Scourge of the Underworld and discovers that Scourge is a group of killers trained towards the singular purpose of wiping out supervillains. U.S. Agent attempts to infiltrate the organization, but is captured, tortured, and interrogated until he is released by a masked operative who reveals himself to be Mike Walker – U.S. Agent's older brother who he had long thought to have died in the Vietnam War. Mike tries to convince U.S. Agent to join the Scourge program before letting him go in order to think it over.

It is later revealed that "Mike" is not U.S. Agent's brother at all but rather a cleverly designed deception intended to lure U.S. Agent into joining the Scourge program. U.S. Agent decides against joining the program, at which point the imposter unsuccessfully attempts to kill him.

U.S. Agent tracks down the benefactor of the Scourge program, who is revealed to be former superhero Thomas Halloway. Halloway set up the Scourge organization using his immense wealth after a civilian was killed by a bullet that was meant for him. Unable to continue his costumed career because of the guilt, he instead decided to set up the organization to atone for his failings as a crime-fighter and battle those criminals who would undermine America's moral character.

U.S. Agent and Bloodstain battle one last time, and Bloodstain is eventually dispatched by his own bullets as they deflect off U.S. Agent's shield. Thomas Halloway is subsequently arrested for his crimes and the Scourge program seemingly closed down. Later, U.S. Agent muses that just like Halloway, he had done things as a hero that he feels he needs to make amends for, but promises that unlike Halloway he will find the true path to salvation.

U.S. Agent fought alongside the Avengers in several battles. After the Avengers moved to a United Nations-based charter, he received only one vote (though not from himself) in the ensuing vote, and consequently lost his place on the team. Even with his personality conflicts and reckless behavior, he soon proved himself worthy of being an Avenger and was able to rejoin.

=== Force Works ===
When the West Coast Avengers dissolve, John Walker dumps his U.S. Agent costume and shield into the Hudson River. Soon after, most of the then-current members of the West Coast Avengers are requested to join Force Works. Initially, U.S. Agent was reluctant; however, Scarlet Witch later persuaded him to join, stating that she needed U.S. Agent to be the team's "backbone" and intended to run the team on tight military lines and the values of strength and dedication. U.S. Agent ultimately joined the new team, wearing a new costume and using an energy-based shield provided to him by Tony Stark.

U.S. Agent travels to an isolated region of Tennessee in order to locate Hawkeye, who had disappeared after the death of Mockingbird. Angry at the fact that Hawkeye had abandoned his teammates when they had desperately needed his support to avoid the dissolution of the West Coast Avengers, U.S. Agent finds him and they initially fight before eventually reconciling. Hawkeye vents that he has been through a lot with the death of his lover Mockingbird, and that he mistrusts Tony Stark. U.S. Agent confesses that he is haunted by the death of his parents. Hawkeye leaves, but thanks U.S. Agent for helping him deal with his emotions.

U.S. Agent formulates a plan to reconcile Hawkeye with the rest of his former teammates – especially Stark – by inviting him as a secret guest to a Christmas party. While Hawkeye waits alone, he monitors U.S. Agent and Force Works via video feed as Stark gives a sincere apology for his behavior. Hawkeye only catches the part of the speech where Stark talks about Hawkeye's "loud mouthed opinions", switching the feed off before he hears Stark refer to Hawkeye as a friend and the backbone of the West Coast Avengers team, stating that he misses his presence more than anything.

=== Heroes Return ===
U.S. Agent becomes the field leader of the Jury, a group of armored corporate vigilantes, now using an eagle-shaped shield that can be directed in mid-air via remote control. The Jury are tasked with taking down the Thunderbolts, but they are defeated by the Thunderbolts and their new leader Hawkeye.

U.S. Agent was severely beaten to near-death by Protocide. Due to emergency medical procedures performed on him, he is given an enhancing exo-skeleton.

=== S.T.A.R.S. ===
Following his recovery, U.S. Agent rejoins the Commission on Superhuman Activities, with the position at the head of the federal government's U.S. Marshal division, called S.T.A.R.S., the Superhuman Tactical Activities Response Squad. The group battled alien invaders and superhuman threats and was responsible for their imprisonment. In this role, he was placed in charge of coordinating Earth's heroes during the 'Maximum Security' crisis when Earth became a prison planet, claiming that he was needed to prevent the other heroes getting 'sidetracked' by their concern for the prisoners to ensure that their focus remained on what was best for Earth.

U.S. Agent continued to work for S.T.A.R.S. as America's super human 'top cop' under the observation of Valerie Cooper. In this role, his former love and current agent of S.H.I.E.L.D, Kali Vries — with whom he had endured Army boot camp many years previously, and who had bested him in almost all physical tests — was thrust upon him as second-in-command. U.S. Agent was uncomfortable with Vries' appointment as she had previously jilted him, although she was still affectionate towards him. Other S.T.A.R.S. agents warned Agent that Vries was playing him. Vries is later revealed to be in the employ of ambitious Senator Warkovsky and, on his order, places a parasite capable of allowing mind control on U.S. Agent's neck.

In their second mission together, U.S. Agent and Vries battle a radical faction of Atlanteans working with Poundcakes. It transpired that Pouncey was attempting to trade more of the alien parasites capable of mind control with the Atlanteans. The Sub-Mariner (Namor) disrupts the battle and discovers the parasite placed on U.S. Agent's neck by Vries. Vries later attends Agent's room and attempts to seduce him, placing another parasite on him. U.S. Agent — apparently no longer in control of his own will, and despite being informed that a S.H.I.E.L.D. envoy had been dispatched — then takes the duffle bag full of parasites seized by S.T.A.R.S. in order to take them to his manipulator who transpires to be none other than the Power Broker (Curtis Jackson) — the man originally responsible for granting John Walker his super-human powers, whose plan is to infect the international assemblage of heads of state with the mind-controlling parasites.

Power Broker places a parasite on the neck of Senator Warkovsky, intent upon influencing his address to the international assemblage of heads of state, but is interrupted by U.S. Agent, who is subsequently assaulted by Captain America, intent upon stopping him. The two battle, with neither of them able to gain the upper hand. Meanwhile, Vries is captured by the Power Broker, who reveals that he had been attacked and left for dead by aliens during the 'Maximum Security' crisis, at which point, barely alive, he had become the host for an alien which produced the mind-controlling parasites, subsequently attempting to expand its control by infecting influential individuals. Power Broker then infects Vries with a parasite. Eventually, Agent manages to escape Captain America's attention long enough to reveal the presence of the parasite on Senator Warkovsky's neck and removes it with his energy baton. Together, Cap and Agent fight off the crowd of V.I.P.s (also apparently under the control of the Power Broker), escaping and then teaming up to restrain both Power Broker and Vries and removing the parasites from each of them. Dum Dum Dugan then appears on the scene to inform U.S. Agent that Vries was actually a deep cover agent acting on behalf of S.H.I.E.L.D. with the intention of gaining Senator Warkovsky's confidence and discovering who was using the parasites and attempting to take the mother-parasite into custody for study and as evidence. Agent destroys the specimen and then speculates that he did not believe it to be alien at all but rather a product of a government genetics lab that went wrong. Dugan is suspicious by his silence and shocked when Captain America indicates that he believes U.S. Agent's accusation.

=== Invaders ===
Clockwise from top left: Human Torch (Jim Hammond), Captain America, Sub-Mariner, Union Jack (Joseph Chapman), U.S. Agent, and Blazing Skull on the cover to New Invaders #1, with art by Scott Kolins.

Walker eventually became a member of the New Invaders, wearing a Captain America-like costume, serving alongside the likes of the original Human Torch, Union Jack (Joseph Chapman), and the Blazing Skull, until the team disbanded.

U.S. Agent's first task was to negotiate the release of the Blazing Skull from captivity at the hands of Middle-Eastern terrorists. It is revealed that U.S. Agent can speak fluent Arabic, but he is forced to exterminate the terrorists when they renege on the agreed deal.

The New Invaders then team up with Namor and his Atlantean forces in order to overthrow the government of Mazikhandar – an alliance Namor agrees to because Mazikhandar has been choking the seas with pollution by sinking oil tankers in an effort to control supply to the United States.

The New Invaders, alongside the forces of Atlantis, assault Mazikhandar's government forces, scattering them and moving on to the capitol building in order to capture its head of state. However, they find themselves opposed by none other than the Avengers. U.S. Agent is confronted by Captain America, who calls him a disgrace to the uniform, instructing him to take it off before he tears it off, but Walker replies that his country gave him that uniform because Rogers was not willing to do what they needed him to. Walker calls Rogers a traitor, and states that his country has given him the authority of the real Captain America, and that Rogers never understood duty to country and doing what is required to keep its shores safe. Rogers retorts that Captain America represents an ideal for all people, of all countries.

Mazikhandar's leader is presented to his successor, who promptly executes him. Thin Man uncovers that Mazikhandar's previous leader was a simulacrum who was implanted when U.S. Secretary of Defense Dell Rusk (secretly the Red Skull) had the real leader assassinated. The fighting ends when Namor announces that he has formed an alliance with Mazikhandar and that it is now a protectorate of Atlantis.

=== Civil War ===
In the special one-shot Civil War: Choosing Sides, Tony Stark (at this point, the U.S. Secretary of Defense) orders U.S Agent north to Canada – vulnerable due to the death of most of Alpha Flight's members. He will act as a liaison to the newly formed Omega Flight team, with an objective to stop criminals who are dodging the Superhuman Registration Act. U.S. Agent initially refuses this offer.

U.S. Agent is attacked by a team of S.H.I.E.L.D. agents mind-controlled by the super villain Purple Man, but is overcome by the Purple Man himself who orders him to fall from great height after stealing his shield – something he only survives because of his advanced biology. U.S. Agent is persuaded to join Omega Flight after learning that Purple Man has fled north.

=== Mighty Avengers ===
During the "Dark Reign" storyline, U.S. Agent is removed from Omega Flight by Loki (disguised as the Scarlet Witch) to aid Hank Pym in defeating Chthon. Chthon's power is tied to Mount Wundagore, which Iron Man intends to destroy to deprive Chthon of his power. Pym's team ultimately finds a less destructive alternative to defeat Chthon by trapping him in the Darkhold, and U.S. Agent quits the Omega Flight team, stating that he belongs with the Avengers.

=== Thunderbolts ===
U.S. Agent and several members of the now disbanded Mighty Avengers are called upon by Amadeus Cho during the events of Siege. Their mission is to stop Norman Osborn's Thunderbolts from stealing Odin's spear from the Asgardian armory. After engaging the Thunderbolts in battle, Nuke cuts off U.S. Agent's left arm and leg.

As thanks for his service during the siege of Asgard, John Walker is appointed as warden of the Raft maximum security prison. The injuries he sustained during his fight with Nuke have left him unable to walk and using a wheelchair and prosthetic arm. He refuses to repair his body using more technologically advanced prostheses because he does not want to become a cyborg like the man who crippled him. Walker engages several inmates in hand-to-hand combat during a prison riot, demonstrating that he can still hold his own despite his limitations.

During the "Fear Itself" storyline, the Juggernaut heavily damaged the Raft before escaping, causing a prison break. This triggered a security fail-safe in one section of the jail which reversed the air supply, eventually creating a fatal vacuum. Walker set out to override the system, which could only be done in person. He was assisted by Ghost, who earned Walker's respect after protecting the lives of the ungrateful inmates. Walker also rallies other help, inmate and powered alike, to assist him in his duties throughout this crisis. Norman Osborn escapes the Raft due in part to traitors on staff (one had a shrine to Osborn), which leaves Walker under a cloud of suspicion.

When Bucky Barnes once more assembled a Thunderbolts team with the objective of ending the threat of the Red Skull, he would travel to Hong Kong to recruit U.S. Agent with the assistance of Shang-Chi. U.S. Agent was preparing for a covert military mission alongside his partner Todd Ziller (American Kaiju) to destroy a weapons development program in Latveria, but the mission objectives were a lie and had been secretly manipulated by fascist sympathizers of the Red Skull within the United States government and military in order to create a distraction to enable the Red Skull to escape justice once more.

The Red Skull uses trigger words embedded within Todd Zillers psyche to activate his powers, resulting in him losing control and attacking the city in his Kaiju form. Bucky - with the assistance of one of Shang-Chi's ten rings - grows to colossal size in order to stop the Kaiju and is about to kill him to end his threat when a shield hit from U.S. Agent and the look on Walker's face reminds him of the look he saw on Steve Rogers face the moment Roger's believed he had lost his own partner to an exploding bomb. Bucky redoubles his efforts to knock American Kaiju out rather than kill him. Bucky thanks Walker for checking him before he killed American Kaiju and invites him to join the Thunderbolts team for the final assault on the Red Skulls facility in Latveria

=== Dark Avengers ===
U.S. Agent and the Dark Avengers are thrown into an alternate world where, while unconscious, U.S. Agent is examined by an alternate reality Hank Pym and determined to be "John Walker, ex-Marine Captain." June Covington is seemingly able to restore his lost limbs with help from this reality's version of the Venom symbiote in lobotomized form.

=== Civil War II ===
During the "Civil War II" storyline, U.S. Agent meets with Paul Keane, president of Keane Industries, who, along with others, asks him to convince Captain America (Sam Wilson) to give up the shield and stand down. At first John declines the request, out of respect for Steve's decision to share the mantle with Sam, until they see a news report about Sam and Rage fighting the Americops, a private police force funded by Keane Industries. After Sam escapes from the Americops, U.S. Agent attacks him from behind knocking him out of the sky with his shield. He then tells Sam that he needs to stand down, saying that he is out of control and that he should hand over the shield. Sam refuses, acknowledging his mistakes when he assumed the mantle, and the two begin to fight, with John gaining the upper hand due to his powers. Sam defeats U.S. Agent by dragging him into a tunnel, where in the darkness the great horned owls that live in it gave him the advantage, allowing him to see through their eyes whilst Agent remains blind. It is later revealed that John never wanted to fight Sam until Steve approached him and convinced him to do so, saying that Sam has lost his way and needs to stand down. U.S. Agent was then reported missing in action on a secret mission to Syria, with a possible implication that his disappearance may have been the result of the now evil Steve Rogers's machinations.

=== Avengers Standoff ===
During the events of Avengers Standoff, U.S. Agent, in his civilian guise of John Walker, attended a black market auction on Barbuda (formally A.I.M) Island where he bid on and won the Axiom Protocols—a drive containing strategies on how to defeat every superhuman on Earth that had been derived from the encyclopedic knowledge of S.H.I.E.L.D agent Phil Coulson. Coulson, who had also been in attendance at the auction disguised as Wolverine, later retrieves the protocols by disabling Walker with knock-out gas.

=== Secret Empire ===
During the "Secret Empire" storyline, U.S. Agent appears briefly alongside the American resistance forces, including fellow former West Coast Avengers teammates Mockingbird and Tigra. Together while aiding other allied group of superhero and super-villain resistances, they battle the Superior Octopus (Otto Octavius) and the forces of Steve Rogers's Hydra organization which took over America. All-New Captain America, Ant-Man and the Winter Soldier manage to redeem Kobik and return the real Rogers back from imprisonment inside the Cosmic Cube, allowing the real Rogers (who immediately dons the classic Captain America costume) to defeat his Hydra counterpart.

He later joined a team of heroes recruited by Captain Marvel to hunt down the Punisher for his actions when he was a member of Hydra Supreme's "Secret Empire", even though the Punisher had been manipulated by Hydra and was now hunting every last one of them in revenge.

U.S. Agent, believing that the Steve Rogers who had led Hydra had been the genuine article, later confronted the real Rogers as he investigated a new spate of murders by the Scourge of the Underworld, beating him and accusing him of manipulating him. He is stopped when Misty Knight activates a stasis beam to hold him in place, at which point Rogers explains that he did not commit the crimes U.S. Agent is accusing him of and that "someday we're going to grab a beer and I'll tell you exactly what went wrong".

=== Force Works 2020 ===
U.S. Agent forms part of a new iteration of the superhero team Force Works during the "Iron Man 2020" storyline. Assembled to act as the U.S government's last, best line of defense against an uprising of robots and artificial intelligences, they are sent to the fictional South American nation of Lingares where their aircraft is shot down by local rebels. After surviving the crash landing, U.S. Agent is forced to fight off a group of rebels with the assistance of Mockingbird before rendezvousing with the rest of the team, at which point they are attacked and seemingly overwhelmed by a group of rebels infected with Deathlok technology.

While held captive with his shield confiscated, it is revealed that the Deathloks want the team for spare parts in their war against an even bigger threat: Ultimo. The team is rescued by War Machine and are surprised to discover that he had been rescued by MODOK Superior who now desires to join the team in order to add some "much-needed brain power" to their ranks.

Once War Machine gets a clear shot on the head, MODOK reveals his intent to take over Ultimo's body. Retreating into a bunker, Mockingbird states the Poseidon Protocols will have Quake sink the island if Ultimo cannot be stopped, but Quake is reluctant to risk killing civilians. War Machine has Quake distract MODOK to buy the rest of Force Works time to figure out how to stop the Deathloks. War Machine finds the central processor in the command unit as U.S. Agent takes down the bearded Deathlok that has it. The Deathloks are soon controlled by War Machine who partially turned himself into a Deathlok to use the command unit. Ulti-MODOK falls into the lava in the chasm that Quake opened as the Deathloks follow him in, attacking to get him in there. War Machine is rescued by Mockingbird and U.S. Agent as Quake closes the chasm.

=== John Walker: U.S. Agent ===
A five issue mini-series written by Christopher Priest and illustrated by Georges Jeanty, John Walker: U.S. Agent sees the character fired by the government and now acting as a private security consultant. Having had his official status as U.S. Agent revoked, all of his government-issued equipment (such as his Vibranium shield) has been recalled, forcing him to make do with a series of less durable facsimiles. Whilst working a case to thwart a would-be bomber in New York, U.S. Agent encounters Morrie Watanabe before being reactivated by a low-level employee of the Office of National Emergency as a joke to upset his former boss Valerie Cooper. U.S. Agent is sent to Ephraim, West Virginia to investigate the destruction of a distribution facility by the disgruntled local population who blame it for taking employment from the townsfolk. Upon their arrival they come under attack by a group of masked assailants, the leader of which is revealed to be Walker's younger sister Katie Tollifson.

It is revealed that Katie has followed in her brother's footsteps by becoming a government contractor herself and has developed a grudge against John, considering that he had forgotten about her in favor of concentrating on his career as a costumed hero. Like John, Katie was hired to investigate the destruction of the facility which she discloses to have been a front for secret S.H.I.E.L.D activities. The destroyed facility contained specialized fuel cells, one of which has gone missing and in its damaged state is leaking a highly toxic energy that could kill everyone in the town. Additionally the fuel cells were powering a containment field around a classified subterranean asset that is now in danger of being released. U.S. Agent takes off towards the town to investigate but upon his arrival is immediately mistaken by the locals for Captain America despite his efforts to persuade them otherwise. Through his inquiries Walker concludes that the people of the town have no involvement in the disappearance of the missing fuel cell, which brings him into conflict with his sister who considers them to be "liars and bigots who reject science and reason for guns and religion" and does not share John's faith in what he sees as his people. Katie also reveals to John that their brother Mike, who John had always considered his personal hero and inspiration, did not die in a helicopter crash in a war zone as he had long thought, but actually committed suicide after being responsible for a fire at their childhood home that nearly resulted in the death of his two siblings. A furious Walker leaves at which point the members of Katie's team are silently killed by masked assailants led by a man who Katie passionately embraces before addressing as the new U.S. Agent.

Walker visits Cooper to inquire about how his sister ended up working for the government to which she replies she had no involvement in recruiting her but does confirm that Walker's replacement as U.S. Agent has been sent to clean up the mess in the town, although she has no idea who the new U.S. Agent actually is. Cooper informs Walker that Katie had dyed her hair blonde when last she met her, which leads him to conclude that she must have been involved in the theft of the missing fuel cell in light of the fact her hair in now lavender - a change that he is aware can be caused by chemical waste from the fuel cell reacting with hair dye. It is also confirmed that Walker was fired/quit as U.S. Agent after he refused to follow orders to use what would have been unreasonable force to break up a peaceful protest. Elsewhere it is confirmed that Katie and the new U.S. Agent were indeed responsible for taking the missing fuel cell in order to remove the containment field around the secret asset so that they could access it for themselves. The new U.S. Agent, who refers to himself as Saint, is shown to derive his powers from periodic injections of a mysterious blue substance that increases his strength. Saint ambushes Battlestar on his way to contact Walker and the two engage in a vicious battle during which Saint criticized Battlestar for allowing himself to be a sidekick to Walker during his time as Captain America despite being more qualified than Walker for the role, also accusing him of being ashamed of his own blackness and being a living symbol of black people's complicity in their own oppression, before beating him into unconsciousness. Katie retrieves an old S.H.I.E.L.D Helicarrier that had been buried below the destroyed Ephraim facility.

Saint is revealed to have been recruited and trained as part of a secret military program that Morrie had led, and obtained the title of U.S. Agent after the role was privatized and sold off. Katie is confirmed to also have super powers obtained as a result of the same injection that grants Saint his. Both Walker and Saint fear that Katie is suffering a psychosis induced by prolonged exposure to the damaged fuel cells and intends to use the retrieved Helicarrier to wipe out the town of Ephraim and its people who she professes to hate. Walker makes his way to the Helicarrier standing on the wing of an old crop duster plane, at which point it is revealed that the asset hidden under the destroyed facility was not the Helicarrier at all but in fact a monstrous Kaiju that destroys the plane and sends Walker plummeting towards the creature.

Walker correctly surmises the Kaiju as being part of the "American Kaiju Project" - another failed attempt to create the super-soldier serum. The Kaiju was contained below the town of Ephraim and later provided the source of the serum used to grant Katie and Saint their powers - a serum that is revealed to be the only thing keeping Saint alive after prolonged use of it altered his DNA. On the Helicarrier, Saint, wielding the original vibranium U.S. Agent shield, confronts Katie in an attempt to stop her and save the town. Katie reveals to Saint that she considers her brother a joke, that she can do better, and that she manipulated Saint as the new U.S. agent to gain access and powers of her own that she will use to stop government lies and corporate manipulation as America's newest super patriot. The two fight and Saint uses the distraction caused by Walker steering the Kaiju into the Helicarrier to stop Katie with a bullet to the head from his pistol. Landing on the Helicarrier, Walker attacks Saint for his role in injuring Battlestar and indoctrinating his sister, to which Saint responds that it was Katie who manipulated him and that her motive had been to replace Walker as U.S. Agent. The Helicarrier crashes and Saint drags Walker from the wreckage before collapsing due to overuse of the Kaiju serum at which point Walker retrieves the original U.S. Agent shield for himself. Later, Valerie Cooper informs Walker that his sister survived her gunshot wound and has been moved to a psych ward for treatment. Cooper also reveals that Katie's story about their brother committing suicide was a lie and a result of her psychosis. Cooper expresses that Walker might actually be more useful without official government status, which Walker interprets as him being able to break the rules and act with impunity and without oversight, also refusing to return the shield despite it being official government property.

=== The United States of Captain America ===
Days before he was due to lend his shield to a museum exhibit, Captain America is robbed by a super-fast assailant wearing his costume. He enlists former Captain Americas Sam Wilson, Bucky Barnes, and John Walker to reclaim the stolen shield, and their pursuit leads them to the "Captains Network" - a loose collective of people protecting their communities under the mantle of Captain America. Walker is recruited by Steve Rogers in a bar having had one too many Boilermaker but he soon regains sobriety when Rogers informs him that there is a neo-fascist plot to destroy the legacy of the shield and reminds Walker that he loves his country "...more than most. Perhaps as much as I do". Together the assembled Captains past and present travel to a top secret facility where Sin, Warrior Woman and a brainwashed Speed Demon are seeking to release Hate-Monger who they propose to set up as a new leader for a divided America. Walker knocks out the hypnotized Speed Demon. When Sin is captured she is confident that she will be able to resist any questioning from the likes of Rogers and his "cub scouts", that is until Walker volunteers to interrogate her, adding that he was "expelled from the cub scouts".

Sure enough Sin talks under Walker's interrogation as he reveals that he used techniques such as fear, futility, sleep adjustment, isolation, sensory deprivation, and stress positions. Captain America seems shocked at the methods used but Walker reassures him that all of the techniques are permissible under the Geneva Conventions.

=== Devil's Reign ===
It is an election year and as part of his re election campaign during the "Devil's Reign" storyline, Mayor Wilson Fisk is gunning for the superhero community, making all super-powered activity within New York City prohibited. U.S. Agent is the leader of the latest iteration of Fisk's Thunderbolts as he leads Agony, Electro, and Rhino against Moon Knight as their first target.

U.S. Agent promises to keep the Thunderbolts on a short leash and make sure they play nice so that everyone stays safe and Fisk ends up looking good, adding "I don't walk the line. I don't cross the line. I AM the line". True to his word, U.S. Agent prevents the Thunderbolts from keeping diamonds stolen during a robbery they stop for themselves by beating each member single-handedly and promising to turn them into a team, threatening that anyone who thinks otherwise "is gonna find themselves under my boot". What Fisk does not know is that the U.S. Agent is secretly working with the FBI to find any incriminating evidence of any illegal activities that Fisk has committed while in office, although Agony is suspicious of his motives.

U.S. Agent was employed to provide security at the Myrmidon high-security super-powered holding facility when it was attacked by Daredevil who, as leader of the Fist (an organization meant to challenge the Hand) infiltrates the facility in order to break out the various villains incarcerated there and offer them "salvation". Daredevil takes out the armored Guardsmen by first killing the lights before taking them down with his baton. U.S. Agent then challenges Daredevil to fight him "like a man", but Daredevil - who reminds U.S. Agent that he led the Thunderbolts under Wilson Fisk's rule - easily beats him before leaving, taking U.S. Agent's shield with him.

== Powers and abilities ==
As a result of an experimental mutagenic augmentation process carried out on him by Dr. Karl Malus on behalf of the Power Broker, John Walker has superhuman strength, agility, reflexes, and endurance. His speed, dexterity, coordination, and balance are comparable to those of a top Olympic athlete.

U.S. Agent is a skilled hand-to-hand combatant and trained in gymnastics and acrobatics. The Taskmaster rigorously trained him in unarmed combat and the use of his shield in a style similar to Captain America.

He is a seasoned combat veteran with military combat experience in tactical and strategic planning, observations, and special operations, has been shown to have a fluent grasp of Arabic and Spanish, is technically proficient enough to bypass an advanced security system, is a qualified fixed-wing pilot, a trained scuba diver, and is highly proficient in the use of conventional firearms.

He is capable of using his nearly indestructible vibranium shield for defensive purposes and as a weapon. He has great accuracy at throwing his shield, and due to his superhuman strength, it is potentially a lethal weapon.

After being crippled by Nuke, John Walker lost one arm and one leg. Electing to use ordinary low-tech prosthesis, he retired his U.S. Agent identity, and no longer has access to his weapons and gear. However, he still retains his full capability to act in self-defense.

=== Equipment ===
At one point, the Agent used wrist guards which produced an energy shield as well as energy blasts. U.S. Agent's costume incorporated a "thought relay receptor" that picks up his mental commands and shapes his shield however he wills it. In U.S. Agent's own words "It's better than the old trash can lid!"

In his first costumed identity as the Super Patriot, Walker wore a costume that was capable of stopping multiple shots from a handgun at point-blank range, and also used throwing stars and a flame torch. U.S. Agent also wears synthetic stretch bulletproof fabric.

== Reception ==
Neal Curtis wrote that the character's 1987 story (as Super-Patriot) was "an excellent example of the way Marvel constantly negotiates competing visions of America". He further notes that "despite his passionate love for his country, Walker’s dogmatic belief in America first, together with his own involvement with a campaign of retribution and revenge, shows him to be wholly unfit to assume the mantle." He also commented on the earlier 1969 story, noting that the first incarnation of this character "was an explicit racist who promoted anti-immigration policies and then met his end when he tripped himself up on an American flag, he had draped himself in and fell to his death", which portrayed the author's message that American ideals are opposed to "this advocate of exclusionary nationhood".

=== Accolades ===
- In 2012, IGN ranked U.S. Agent 29th in their "Top 50 Avengers" list.
- In 2015, Entertainment Weekly ranked U.S. Agent 67th in their "Let's rank every Avenger ever" list.
- In 2018, CBR.com ranked U.S. Agent 20th in their "Shield Of Dreams: The Very Best Captain Americas" list.
- In 2020, CBR.com ranked U.S. Agent 7th in their "Marvel: Every Version Of Captain America" list.
- In 2022, Screen Rant included U.S. Agent in their "10 Most Powerful Members Of The Thunderbolts" list.
- In 2022, CBR.com ranked U.S. Agent 10th in their "Thunderbolts' 10 Best Leaders" list.

== Other versions ==
=== Days of Future Past ===
An alternate universe version of U.S. Agent appears in X-Men Days of Future Past: Doomsday. This version is a member of the Defenders, a group designed to replace the Avengers.

=== Infinity Wars ===
U.S. Archmage (John Kaluu), a composite character based on U.S. Agent and Kaluu, appears in "Infinity Wars". This version is a soldier in the U.S Army who became the Soldier Supreme after his predecessor, Stephen Rogers, disappeared. Kaluu fought against the Communists during the Cold War, but proved to be out of control because of his use of dark magic and was placed in suspended animation. In the present day, Kaluu escapes following the return of Stephen Rogers, with the two becoming uneasy allies.

=== Marvel Zombies ===
An alternate universe version of U.S. Agent makes a minor appearance in Marvel Zombies: Dead Days.

=== SS Agent ===
An alternate universe version of U.S. Agent appears in Avengers Next. This version is the deputy leader of the Thunder Guard, a superhuman police force.

=== Ultimate Marvel ===
An alternate universe version of John Walker appears in the Ultimate Marvel imprint. This version is a high-ranking official at Camp Angel, a facility designed to hold mutants.

=== Ultimate Universe ===
An alternate universe version of John Walker from Earth-6160 appears in the Ultimate Universe imprint. This version is a member of the Red Skull Gang who was empowered by a Stark Box. Walker and the Red Skull Gang battle the Ultimates, during which he is burned by Human Torch. A scarred Walker later contacts Captain America, having taken on the Red Skull mantle.

=== What If? ===
Several alternate universe versions of John Walker appear in the series What If.

- In an alternate reality, John Walker is Captain America and battles Steve Rogers, with only the intervention of Nick Fury and then-President Ronald Reagan bringing the hostilities to an end. After Rogers is assassinated on the Red Skull's orders, Walker is assigned to replace him, but proves to be violent and lethal. Eventually, Walker is stopped and imprisoned in the Vault for his crimes, but the government—realizing that the man inside the costume was far more important than the costume itself—decides to retire the Captain America role.
- In a dystopian alternate reality in which Steve Rogers is not recovered from ice until much later in history, John Walker is known as American Agent.

== In other media ==
=== Marvel Cinematic Universe ===
John Walker as Captain America and U.S. Agent appears in media set in the Marvel Cinematic Universe (MCU), portrayed by Wyatt Russell. This version wields a firearm and Captain America's shield, which Steve Rogers had bequeathed to Sam Wilson, who in turn gave it to the government and subsequently issued to Walker. Additionally, Walker has a supportive wife named Olivia (portrayed by Gabrielle Byndloss).

- First appearing in the Disney+ miniseries The Falcon and the Winter Soldier (2021), Walker salvages and ingests a recreated Super Soldier Serum amidst several failed attempts to apprehend the Flag Smashers. After the Flag Smashers' leader, Karli Morgenthau, kills his partner Lemar Hoskins, an enraged Walker kills one of her fellow Flag Smashers in front of a horrified crowd. In response, Wilson and Bucky Barnes take the shield from him before the government strip him of his role as Captain America and discharge him from service. Walker is later visited and recruited by Valentina Allegra de Fontaine before he visits Hoskins' family to inform them of his death. Still enraged by this and embittered over the government's treatment of him, Walker builds a new shield from scrap metal and his war medals. Despite losing it while fighting Morgenthau, he lets her escape to save a van containing hostages and assists Barnes in capturing the remaining Flag Smashers. Walker and Olivia later meet with De Fontaine again, who gives him a new suit and dubs him "U.S. Agent".
- An American frontier-themed alternate timeline variant of Walker appears in the What If...? episode "What If... 1872?", voiced by Russell. This version is the leader of an outlaw gang.
- Walker appears in the film Thunderbolts* (2025). By this time, his marriage has become strained due to him losing his title as Captain America and neglecting his and Olivia's newborn child. Nonetheless, he helps found the eponymous team to fight the Void before De Fontaine rebrands them as the New Avengers.
- An alternate timeline variant of Walker appears in the television series Marvel Zombies, voiced by Russell. A survivor of a zombie apocalypse, this version became Helmut Zemo's second-in-command and enforcer for the Raft, which they turned into a sanctuary for survivors. After Namor led a group of zombified Talokanil to attack the Raft, Walker and Zemo attempt to escape, only for the former to be killed by Namor.
- Russell will reprise his role as Walker in the upcoming film Avengers: Doomsday.

=== Video games ===
- U.S. Agent appears as a secret playable character in Marvel Super Heroes vs. Street Fighter.
- U.S. Agent appears as an assist character in Marvel vs. Capcom: Clash of Super Heroes.
- U.S. Agent's suit is available as an alternate costume for Captain America in Marvel: Ultimate Alliance and Marvel Heroes.

=== Merchandise ===
- U.S. Agent received an action figure in Toy Biz's Marvel Superheroes toyline.
- U.S. Agent was meant to receive an action figure in Toy Biz's Iron Man tie-in toyline. While it initially did not make it to mass market in the U.S. it was eventually released in international markets before the company released it as a convention exclusive.
- U.S. Agent received an action figure in the Marvel Minimates line as part of a two-pack with Taskmaster.
- U.S. Agent received an action figure in Hasbro's Captain America: The First Avenger tie-in toyline via the Comic Series sub-line.
- U.S. Agent received an action figure in Hasbro's Return of Marvel Legends line.
- U.S. Agent, based on the MCU incarnation and with a design partially inspired by his Captain America suit, received an action figure from Hasbro.

== Collected editions ==
=== As Captain America ===
Title	Material collected	Published Date	ISBN
Captain America Epic Collection: The Captain	Captain America #332–350 and Iron Man #228	August 13, 2021	978-1302930707

=== As U.S.Agent ===
Title	Material Collected	Published Date	ISBN
Captain America: Scourge of the Underworld	U.S.Agent (vol. 1) #1-4 and Marvel Fanfare #29; Amazing Spider-Man #278; Captain America #318-320, #358-362;	March 2, 2011	978-0785149620
Captain America Epic Collection: Arena of Death	U.S.Agent (vol. 1) #1-4 and Captain America #411-419, Annual #11-12; Ghost Rider/Captain America: Fear #1 and material from Silver Sable & the Wild Pack #15	March 15, 2022	978-1302934453
U.S.Agent: The Good Fight	U.S.Agent (vol. 1) #1-4, U.S.Agent (vol. 2) #1-3, Captain America #333 and material from Captain America #358-362, 380-382; Avengers West Coast #100	December 8, 2020	978-1302927448
U.S.Agent: American Zealot	U.S.Agent (vol. 3) #1-5	July 6, 2021	978-1302924768
