= Professor Power =

- Professor Power from Nomad: Girl Without a World #3

Publication information
- Publisher: Marvel Comics
- First appearance: Marvel Team-Up #117 (May 1982)
- Created by: J. M. DeMatteis; Herb Trimpe

In-story information
- Alter ego: Anthony Power
- Species: Human
- Team affiliations: Mutant Force; Secret Empire
- Notable aliases: The Professor, Number One

Professor Power (Anthony Power) is a fictional character appearing in American comic books published by Marvel Comics.

== Publication history ==
His first appearance was in Marvel Team-Up #117, although individuals working for him appear before then.

== Fictional character biography ==
Anthony Power was born in Norfolk, Virginia. He was originally a historian and teacher, and an advisor to the President of the United States of America. He has a son Matthew, who fought in the Vietnam War only to be discharged after having a nervous breakdown due to the violence he witnessed in combat. A right-wing conservative, Power believes that the only way that world peace could be obtained would be if America conquered the world. Knowing that the American government would never agree to such a strategy, Power decided that he would have to conquer the United States in order to bring about his world view. He adopts the name "Professor Power", the head of a subversive organization and the leader of an unnamed army of right-wing extremists.

Aided by the Fixer, Power captures Professor X and attempts to add his mental powers to Mentallo's. He then reveals to Professor X that Matthew Power had slipped into a catatonic state due to his father's refusal to get his son psychological help and that he had paid Mentallo to restore his son to consciousness. In the ensuing psychic battle, Matthew is hit by a stray psychic blast, damaging his mind beyond repair. Driven insane with rage, Powers transfers his mind into his son's body and seeks revenge against Xavier by plotting the murder of his students.

As Number One, Professor Power is the founder of the third Secret Empire. Power has double agents in the New York S.H.I.E.L.D. headquarters free Leviathan, Mad Dog, and the members of Mutant Force from S.H.I.E.L.D. custody, then sends Leviathan against the Defenders. Power captures the Defenders, and unsuccessfully attempted to brainwash them into killing the New Mutants in revenge against Professor X. Power then launches a subliminal mind-control satellite in an attempt to start World War III, only for the satellite to be destroyed. Moondragon merges Power's consciousness with that of his son, rendering him catatonic.

Some time later, Power is abducted from S.H.I.E.L.D. custody and brought back to his castle in the Adirondack Mountains, where he is revived by his followers. During a battle with Captain America (John Walker), Power is beaten to death. Power's corpse is stolen by his followers, who resurrect him by converting his battle suit into a life-support system.

Professor Power resurfaces in disguise as a high school teacher at the school which Rikki Barnes has been attending under the alias of Rikki Baines. There, he performs mind-control experiments on the student body.

== Powers and abilities ==
Professor Power was originally a normal human with a gifted intellect. He is an excellent long-range planner and battle strategist, and has degrees in history and political science.

His scientists designed for him a battle suit of full body armor capable of flight via jet engines attached to it, and an electron-beam (fired from his right forefinger).

When Professor Power was in Matthew Power's body, he possessed superhuman strength.
