= Venom/Spider-Man: Separation Anxiety =

1995 video game

- North American Genesis box art
- Developer: Software Creations
- Publisher: Acclaim Entertainment
- Producers: Tyrone Miller; Marc Wilding
- Designers: Danny Curley; Chun Wah Kong (credited as Chrono)
- Programmer: Paul Murray
- Composer: Suddi Raval
- Series: Spider-Man
- Platforms: Super NES, Mega Drive/Genesis, PC
- Release: NA: November 1995; EU: 1995
- Genre: Beat 'em up
- Modes: Single-player, multiplayer

Venom/Spider-Man: Separation Anxiety is a 1995 beat 'em up video game and a sequel to Spider-Man and Venom: Maximum Carnage, released for Mega Drive/Genesis and Super NES and then ported to PC. One or two players team up as Spider-Man and Venom to defeat the evil symbiote Carnage. The game boasts many thugs that the player has to defeat: heavily armed Jury and Venom's symbiote children. There is also cameo assistance from Captain America, Ghost Rider, Hawkeye, and Daredevil.

The SNES and Genesis versions were re-released as part of the compilation Marvel MaXimum Collection in 2026.

The game received mediocre reviews, being criticized largely for its repetitiveness, unoriginality and lack of cutscenes.

== Plot ==
Though the game is titled after the comic book series Venom: Separation Anxiety, the story more closely follows the events of Venom's first limited series, Venom: Lethal Protector. The game's plot loosely follows Lethal Protector in the following ways:

- Appearance of Spider-Man (in Lethal Protector #1)
- Confronting the digger in San Francisco (as seen in Lethal Protector #1)
- Discovering the underground city (as seen in Lethal Protector #1)
- Appearance of The Jury (as seen in Lethal Protector #2)
- Removal of five symbiote seeds to create five new symbiotes (as seen in Lethal Protector #4)
- Spider-Man and Venom's escape from the Life Foundation (as seen in Lethal Protector #5)
- Confronting the five symbiotes at the Life Foundation Headquarters (as seen in Lethal Protector #5)

== Reception ==
Reception

Aggregate score
Aggregator	Score
GameRankings	61.50% (SNES); 35.85% (GEN)

Review scores
Publication	Score
Electronic Gaming Monthly	4.75/10 (GEN)
Next Generation	2/5 (GEN, SNES); 1/5 (PC)

Reviewing the Genesis version, Electronic Gaming Monthly's "review crew" unanimously agreed that the game "isn't much fun", particularly finding fault in the repetitive fights with the same enemies and the cheap combat, with its constant flow of unavoidable hits. They generally regarded the ability to play as either Spider-Man or Venom to be the one good feature of the game. A critic for Next Generation commented that the game's graphics, audio, and gameplay "are all on par" with Maximum Carnage, but that there was nothing new or interesting to set the game apart from its predecessor or the other beat 'em up games on the market. GamePro's The Outlaw agreed that the level designs are unoriginal and monotonous, and was one of the few critics to find serious fault with the graphics and sound: "The sprites lack detail, the thugs have washed out faces, and the heroes look dated. The game deserves dynamic music, digitized voice, and maybe some cool effects, but lacks all these key ingredients". He nonetheless concluded it to be a solid action game worth buying, mainly citing the large variety of moves. Reviewing the Super NES version in the same issue, Air Hendrix held it to be superior to the Genesis version due to the more colorful and detailed graphics. Next Generation also found the SNES version's graphics "relatively good", but again emphasized the game's lack of originality.

A reviewer for Next Generation panned the PC port, calling it "an arcade bash-fest with little in the way of the intricacy and depth possible in a PC game". While noting that it was an extremely accurate port, he rated it lower than the Super NES and Genesis versions due to its poor value-for-money; he pointed out that a new Super NES or Genesis and a number of arcade-style beat-'em-ups for those systems could all be picked up for cheap.
