= Kieron Dwyer =

American comics artist

- Born: March 6, 1967 (age 59) Chicago, Illinois, U.S.
- Areas: Writer, Penciller, Inker

Kieron Dwyer (born March 6, 1967) is an American comics artist. He is best known for his work for Marvel Comics and DC Comics as well as for his creator-owned projects.

== Biography ==
During his career, Dwyer has worked on such comic book titles as Captain America (1987–1990), Danger Unlimited (on the "Torch of Liberty" story) (1994), Action Comics (1995–1996), The Avengers vol. 3 (2001–2003), and his creator-owned series, LCD: Lowest Comic Denominator.

Dwyer's first published comics work was the story "The Ghost of Masahiko Tahara" in Batman #413 (Nov. 1987) and he was soon offered the pencilling duties on the monthly Captain America title at Marvel, which he drew for nearly two years during the storyline when John Walker (formerly Super-patriot) was given the mantle of Captain America while Steve Rogers took on the costume and identity of "The Captain." With Steve Rogers reinstated as the official Captain America in issue 350, Dwyer continued pencilling the title through "The Bloodstone Hunt" storyarc as well as the "Acts of Vengeance" crossover issues. Following his run on Captain America, Dwyer collaborated with writer Peter Milligan on the "Dark Knight, Dark City" storyarc in Batman #452–454 (Aug.–Sept. 1990). Dwyer was one of the many artists who contributed to the Superman: The Wedding Album one-shot in 1996 wherein the title character married Lois Lane.

Cover of first LCD issue, signed by the artists, featuring parody of the Starbucks logo that prompted legal actions from the corporation.

Starbucks sued Dwyer in 2000 for parodying their famous siren logo on the first cover of LCD, as well as selling the image on T-shirts and stickers. With assistance from the Comic Book Legal Defense Fund, the two parties settled the case out of court. The settlement established that the image was protected speech, citing the "parody" exception in Constitutional law; however, Dwyer is no longer allowed to use the image for financial gain because of its "confusing similarity" to the original material.

LCD: Lowest Comic Denominator had two "ashcan" editions, #1 (1997) and #2 (1998), before coming out with full comic versions starting in 1999 later with #0 (a second printing was later issued with pieces removed due to the Starbucks legal action) and #1–3. A trade paperback collection of all four issues was published by Image Comics in July 2020.

Dwyer has collaborated with Rick Remender on a number of titles, including XXXombies (the first in a planned line of horror comics Crawl Space), Sea of Red and Night Mary.

As of July 2020, Dwyer has three new books published by Image Comics: Unpresidented, a collection of Dwyer's political cartoons (currently available); Last of the Independents, a hardcover reprint of the original graphic novel written by Matt Fraction (currently available); and the aforementioned LCD: Lowest Comic Denominator trade paperback collection (currently on hold).

== Personal life ==
Kieron Dwyer was born in 1967 in Chicago, Illinois. His father William M. Dwyer and mother Andrea Braun were both actors in Chicago theater and TV ads. Several years after his parents divorced, Dwyer's mother met and married comics creator John Byrne (with whom Dwyer collaborated on the "Torch of Liberty" backups in Danger Unlimited, as well as a one-shot special). Byrne became Dwyer's stepfather when Kieron was 13 and Byrne encouraged Dwyer's aspirations to be a cartoonist and assisted in landing Dwyer's first professional job drawing Batman #413 (Nov. 1987). Braun and Byrne would later divorce, but Dwyer's love of art would continue to grow and flourish.

== Bibliography ==
Comics work includes:

- Batman #413 (with Jo Duffy, DC Comics, November 1987)
- Classic X-Men #17–29 (with Chris Claremont, Marvel Comics, January 1988–January 1989)
- Solo Avengers #2 (Captain Marvel story with Roger Stern, Marvel Comics, January 1988)
- Captain America #338–365, #367 (with Mark Gruenwald, Marvel Comics, February 1988–February 1990)
- Fantastic Four Annual #21 (with Steve Englehart, Marvel Comics, 1988)
- Batman #452–454 (with Peter Milligan, DC Comics, August–September 1990)
- Daredevil #289–290 (with Ann Nocenti, Marvel Comics, February–March 1991)
- Action Comics #671 (with Roger Stern, DC Comics, November 1991)
- Danger Unlimited: "Torch of Liberty" (with John Byrne, Legend/Dark Horse Comics, February–May 1994)
- Lobo: A Contract on Gawd #1–4 (with Alan Grant, DC Comics, April–July 1994)
- Action Comics #712–721 (with David Michelinie, DC Comics, August 1995–May 1996)
- The Avengers vol. 3 #48–50, 53–54, 57–60 (with Kurt Busiek and Geoff Johns, Marvel Comics, January 2002–January 2003)
- Remains (with Steve Niles, five–issue limited series, IDW Publishing, May–September 2004)
- Sea of Red #3–13 (script, with co-author Rick Remender, Image Comics, May 2005–November 2006)
- Night Mary (script and art, with co-author Rick Remender, four–issue mini–series, IDW Publishing, July–November 2005)
- XXXombies (with Rick Remender, four–issue mini–series, Image Comics, October 2007–February 2008)
- Shadowpact #20 (with Lilah Sturges, DC Comics, February 2008)
- Fear Agent #20–21 (with Rick Remender, Dark Horse Comics, April–June 2008)
- Nightmaster: Monsters of Rock #1 (with Adam Beechen, DC Comics, January 2011)

== Awards ==
- 2005: Nominated for "Best Cover Artist" Eisner Award, for Remains.

Preceded by Tom Morgan	Captain America penciller 1988–1990	Succeeded by Ron Lim
Preceded by Jackson Guice	Action Comics penciller 1995–1996	Succeeded by Darick Robertson
Preceded by Manuel Garcia	The Avengers vol. 3 penciller 2002–2003	Succeeded by Gary Frank
