= Watchdogs (Marvel Comics) =

Terrorist group in the Marvel Universe

Publication information
- Publisher: Marvel Comics
- First appearance: Captain America #335 (November 1987)
- Created by: Mark Gruenwald (writer); Tom Morgan (artist)

In-story information
- Type of organization: Domestic terrorist

The Watchdogs are a fictional right-wing terrorist group appearing in American comic books published by Marvel Comics, usually as enemies of Captain America.

The Watchdogs have also been adapted into other media, having appeared in the TV series Agents of S.H.I.E.L.D. and the video game Marvel's Avengers.

== Publication history ==
The Watchdogs first appeared in Captain America #335 (Nov 1987) and were created by writer Mark Gruenwald and artist Tom Morgan.

Most of the villains Mark Gruenwald introduced in Captain America were created to symbolize aspects of contemporary American culture and the world political situation. In the case of the Watchdogs, Gruenwald created them to symbolize censorship and repression.

== Philosophy, goals, and activities ==
The Watchdogs are dedicated to restoring and preserving traditional American culture and values, and fighting against indecency, immorality, and sexual perversion. The Watchdogs seek to impose their conservative moral views on the general public; they believe in strict enforcement of family values, and are violently opposed to pornography, obscenity, sex education, abortion, homosexuality, and the teaching of evolutionary theory. Their terrorist activities, which include vandalism, arson, intimidation, assault, kidnapping, brainwashing, and murder, are targeted primarily at people who produce material which the Watchdogs consider pornographic, including nude art and sexually explicit music.

The Watchdogs are active in Georgia, Alabama, Mississippi, Tennessee, West Virginia, Missouri, plus Washington, D.C., and New York City. The Watchdogs imprison their kidnapping victims at a large compound in Vermont, where they force them to wear "dog collars" which the Watchdogs use to administer a painful electric shock as punishment for undesirable behavior. The prisoners are forced to participate in group activities such as sing-alongs, and exposed to constant televised Americana imagery such as baseball games, American flags, fields of flowers, and happy children.

== Organization ==
The Watchdogs are headed by a leader referred to as Watchdog Prime (real name unknown), also called Watchdog One or Top Dog. Each state ("realm") is governed by a Head Dog. Each realm has one or more operating units ("packs"). Individual cells of Watchdogs, called "dogpounds," are organized by city and led by "pack leaders." Members call one another Dog-Brothers. Unbeknownst to nearly all of its membership, the Watchdogs were partially funded by the Red Skull through his dummy corporation, the Freedom Foundations; the Watchdogs receive the rest of their funding through public contributors and other undisclosed financiers. Watchdog Prime held the position of one of the Red Skull's "division chiefs," and the Red Skull saw in them an opportunity to harm America by creating chaos. Whether Watchdog Prime was deceived by the Skull or was secretly working against that which he claimed to uphold is unknown.

The Watchdogs use conventional technology, with all weapons and paraphernalia purchased from legitimate retailers; members use their own ground vehicles, usually pick up trucks, vans, motorcycles, and recreational vehicles. The Watchdogs wear identical costumes of synthetic stretch fabric resembling riot gear, consisting of tight-fighting purple shirts and pants with gold-colored gloves, leather boots and accessories, armored kevlar vests, and hard plastic helmets with built-in visors. They are trained in the use of firearms, and usually arm themselves with conventional American-manufactured handguns, shotguns, and rifles, and Army surplus explosives. Watchdogs also carry Army surplus walkie-talkies, and short-wave radios. The Red Skull denies Watchdog Prime's request for funding to purchase exotic weaponry, because use of such weapons would undermine the group's image as a grassroots organization.

A Watchdog member must be an adult male over 21 with a valid gun permit willing to sign an affidavit in blood that he is not a homosexual, believes in the Bible and the United States Constitution, disavows all immoral acts, and is willing to use violence to oppose all activities, materials, institutions, and individuals which are deemed by the organization to undermine the morality and decency of the United States.

== Fictional team biography ==
The Watchdogs were introduced as the first group fought by John Walker and Lemar Hoskins after officially becoming the new Captain America and Bucky, respectively. A major Watchdog pack torches an adult bookstore and women's health clinic, and attempts to lynch an alleged pornographer. This pack is busted by John Walker, as the interim Captain America, who was initially conflicted in his opposition to the Watchdogs because he shared their political views. The Watchdogs later hold Walker's parents captive in an effort to get revenge upon him; during the ensuing melee, the Watchdogs murdered his parents, and Walker became a bitter enemy of the organization. The Red Skull was seen to have employed a single Watchdog in his elite cadre of bodyguards.

At the public ceremony where Walker relinquished his title of Captain America to Rogers, a lone Watchdog shot and apparently killed Walker. In the same issue, an unnamed member of the Watchdogs was killed by the Scourge of the Underworld disguised as a government agent. The "Watchdog" was actually a government agent who staged the ruse on Walker's behalf so that he can re-emerge as the U.S. Agent. As Captain America, Rogers continued to oppose the Watchdogs, especially once they kidnapped his then-girlfriend Bernie Rosenthal.

Although he and U.S. Agent arrested all the Watchdogs at the Vermont compound, the organization remains active. Watchdog Prime joins his fellow division chiefs in a meeting with the Red Skull, intending to expand their operations and membership westward across the United States.

== Other versions ==
In the Ultimate Marvel universe, the Watchdogs are a terrorist hate group whose members were killed by Scourge.

== In other media ==
=== Television ===
The Watchdogs appear in media set in the Marvel Cinematic Universe. This version of the group is a radical Inhuman-hunting group who recruit new members from prisons.

- The group first appears in the television series Agents of S.H.I.E.L.D., led by ex-S.H.I.E.L.D. agent Felix Blake and secretly supported by Hydra in the third season before they are replaced by Anton Ivanov / The Superior and anti-Inhuman senator Ellen Nadeer in the fourth season.
- A group of Watchdogs led by an "Alpha Dog" appear in the companion web series Agents of S.H.I.E.L.D.: Slingshot.

=== Video games ===
The Watchdogs appear in Marvel's Avengers. This version of the group originated as a vigilante group who captured and eliminated Inhumans before becoming hired guns for A.I.M. and coming into conflict with the Avengers. They also utilize advanced weaponry such as flamethrowers, riot shields, and jet packs.
