= X-Men: Regenesis =

Comic book

- Publisher: Marvel Comics
- Publication date: October 2011
- Genre: Superhero; Crossover
Title(s)
- Generation Hope #12–15
- New Mutants, vol. 3 #33–36
- Uncanny X-Men, vol. 1 #544, vol. 2 #1–3
- Uncanny X-Force #19
- Wolverine and the X-Men #1–4
- X-Factor, vol. 3 #230
- X-Men, vol. 3 #20–23
- X-Men: Legacy #259–260, 260.1
- X-Men Regenesis #1 (One-Shot)
- Wolverine, vol 4. #17–19
- Magneto: Not a Hero #1
- X-Club #1
- Avengers Academy #22
- X-23 #17–19
- Marvel Holiday Magazine 2011 #1
- Main character(s): Cyclops; New Mutants; Hope Summers; Wolverine; X-Men

X-Men: Regenesis is a comic book branding used by Marvel Comics that ran through the X-Men family of books beginning in October 2011, following the end of the X-Men: Schism miniseries. This realignment of the mutant population is ahead of the 2012 Marvel event Avengers vs. X-Men which begins during Regenesis with the mini series Avengers: X-Sanction and brings back Cable, who was believed dead following the events of X-Men: Second Coming.

== Publication history ==
In a panel at the October 2011 New York Comic Con, writer Kieron Gillen revealed that Cyclops' team becomes a peacekeeping force, while Dan Abnett and Andy Lanning's New Mutants continues to focus on Danielle Moonstar's mission by Cyclops of integrating the mutants that were left over by the X-Men. In Generation Hope, written by James Asmus, Sebastian Shaw's storyline spins out of his prior appearance in Uncanny X-Men, and that the first mission for Hope Summers's team is to hunt down a new mutant signature. Asmus stated, "The book is going to spiral wildly from there, including all the hormones and kissing that a teenage book should have". In X-Men, writer Victor Gischler explores Jubilee's role on the team. Writer Greg Pak, however, demurred on his plans for Astonishing X-Men, or the details behind the teaser poster of Storm passionately kissing Cyclops, though an additional teaser poster was displayed featuring a character with golden claws. In writer Jason Aaron's flagship book, Wolverine and the X-Men, Wolverine takes on the headmaster role at the Jean Grey School for Higher Learning, though the familiar classroom and Danger Room motifs features the feral mutant's "twists". The companion five-issue miniseries, Wolverine and the X-Men: Alpha and Omega by writer/illustrator Brian Wood, begins with a large battle between Wolverine and Quentin Quire spinning off of "Schism". Editor Daniel Ketchum revealed that X-Men: Legacy continues the exploration of Rogue's allegiance to Wolverine, and a possible love triangle between her, Magneto and Gambit. Peter David's X-Factor sees the return of Havok and Polaris to that book as X-Factor Investigations' morale is at an all-time low. Marvel director of communications, publishing and digital media Arune Singh, regarding writer Rick Remender's book, Uncanny X-Force, referred to the teaser poster, which features Psylocke, Fantomex, Wolverine, Deadpool and Nightcrawler, commenting, "It's important to pay attention to the art and see who's there and who's not there."

Also announced was a new series, Age of Apocalypse by David Lapham and Roborto De La Torre, spinning directly out of Remender's "Dark Angel Saga" storyline. The ongoing Wolverine series, which is written by Jason Aaron and illustrated by Andy Kubert, features, according to Aaron, "the biggest Wolverine solo story [that he has] ever done", to which everything Aaron has done in Wolverine has been building. Jeph Loeb and Simone Bianchi's 2012 run on the title re-introduces Sabretooth.

After finishing up the "Chaos Theory" arc in X-23, writer Marjorie Liu deals with Hellion's return to the East Coast and getting a babysitting gig from the Fantastic Four that goes wrong. In Rob Williams' Daken: Dark Wolverine, the titular character questions his typical brutal methods when he encounters the Runaways, whom he underestimates.

== X-Men divisions ==
The division is set as follows:

Cyclops's team

- Uncanny X-Men features Cyclops, Colossus, Danger, Emma Frost, Magik, Magneto, Namor, Storm, and Hope Summers.
- X-Men features Storm, Psylocke, Colossus, Domino, Jubilee, and Warpath.
- New Mutants features Danielle Moonstar, Cypher, Magma, Sunspot, Warlock, and X-Man.
- Generation Hope features Hope, No-Girl, Pixie, Primal, Sebastian Shaw, Transonic, Velocidad, and Zero.
- Other characters remaining with Cyclops include Doctor Nemesis, Kavita Rao, Box, Dazzler, Boom-Boom, Lifeguard, Prodigy, Dust, Loa, Surge, Crosta, and the Stepford Cuckoos.

Wolverine's team

- Wolverine and the X-Men features Wolverine, Beast, Husk, Iceman, Kid Omega, Oya, Shadowcat, and Lockheed.
- X-Men: Legacy features Rogue, Cannonball, Frenzy, Gambit, Husk, Iceman, and Marvel Girl.
- Astonishing X-Men features Gambit, Iceman, Karma, Northstar, Cecilia Reyes, and Warbird.
- Uncanny X-Force features Wolverine, Deadpool, Fantomex, Nightcrawler, Archangel, and Psylocke.
- X-Factor features Jamie Madrox, Banshee, Havok, Longshot, M, Layla Miller, Polaris, Rictor, Shatterstar, Strong Guy, and Wolfsbane.
- Other characters at Wolverine's school include Ariel, Armor, Anole, Blindfold, Bling!, Blink, Broo, Chamber, Cipher, Doop, Ernst, Face, Gentle, Glob Herman, Graymalkin, Hellion, Indra, Kid Gladiator, Match, Mercury, Rockslide, Toad, Trance, Krakoa, Angel, and Genesis.

== Titles involved ==
- X-Men Regenesis #1 (one-shot)
- Wolverine, vol 4. #17–19
- Magneto: Not a Hero #1 (#2-4 were unbannered)
- X-Club #1 (#2-5 were unbannered)
- Avengers Academy #22 (also bannered as part of Shattered Heroes)
- X-23 #17–19 (unbannered, but event of this story happened during Regenesis.)
- Marvel Holiday Magazine 2011 #1

| Cyclops' X-Men | Wolverine's X-Men |
|---|---|
| Uncanny X-Men, vol.1#544 vol. 2 #1–3 | Wolverine & the X-Men #1–4 |
| X-Men, vol. 3 #20–23 | X-Men: Legacy #259–260 260.1 |
| Astonishing X-Men, vol. 3 #43–47 (#46 and #47 were not bannered) | Uncanny X-Force #19 |
| New Mutants, vol. 3 #33–36 | X-Factor, #230 |
| Generation Hope #12–15(#12 is not bannered) | |
