= X-Men: Manifest Destiny =

American comic book storyline

"Manifest Destiny"
- Cover of X-Men: Manifest Destiny 1 (Nov 2008), art by Humberto Ramos
- Publisher: Marvel Comics
- Publication date: July 2008 – March 2009
- Genre: Superhero; Crossover
Title(s)
Astonishing X-Men #25-30
Cable vol. 3, #6
Eternals vol. 4, #7-9
Secret Invasion: X-Men #1-4
Uncanny X-Men #500-507
Wolverine: Manifest Destiny #1-4
X-Men: Legacy #215-216
X-Men: Manifest Destiny #1-5
X-Men: Manifest Destiny Nightcrawler #1
Young X-Men #6-12
Runaways #10
- Uncanny X-Men: Manifest Destiny: ISBN 0-7851-3818-8
- X-Men: Manifest Destiny: ISBN 0785138188

"Manifest Destiny" is an American comic book storyline published by Marvel Comics through the X-Men related titles and a number of limited series, including a self-titled one. The arc was a follow-up to the storyline entitled "Divided We Stand" which started in the issues cover dated September 2008.

== Premise ==
"Manifest Destiny" deals with the change in the X-Men when they shift their headquarters from Westchester to San Francisco. This is the first time the X-Men have changed their headquarters since their brief relocation to Australia during the 1980s. The series is followed by "X-Infernus", the sequel to "Inferno".

== Publication history ==
The X-Men: Manifest Destiny mini-series itself, is an anthology. The lead story is focused on Iceman and his journey to San Francisco. It is written by Mike Carey, with pencils by Michael Ryan. There are two back-up stories in every issue, focusing on different characters (Karma, Boom-Boom, Nuwa, Juggernaut, Colossus, Nightcrawler, Mercury, and many others) and their lives in San Francisco.

== Plot summary ==
=== Uncanny X-Men ===
The X-Men open their new base in San Francisco and send a telepathic invitation to every remaining mutant on Earth. Their first fights were against Magneto, Sentinels and the newly formed Hellfire Cult. This is also the introduction to the Sisterhood of Evil Mutants and Madelyne Pryor is seen alive.

=== Astonishing X-Men ===
The Astonishing X-Men shows up with a new line-up (Cyclops, Emma Frost, Beast, Storm, Armor, and Wolverine). Their first mission was to investigate the murder of an undiscovered mutant.

=== Cable ===
X-Force captures Bishop and brings him to the X-Men Headquarters in San Francisco, while Cable is seen fighting in the future.

=== X-Men: Legacy ===
Cyclops secretly meets with Xavier as one last favor to his former teacher and friend. Elsewhere, the Hellfire Club is discussing Sunspot leaving their ranks and the void that leaves. As Sebastian Shaw tries to create some order, Castlemere and his newfound cybernetic "upgrades" lay waste to another member of the Hellfire Club.

Rogue makes her way to the X-Men's former base in Australia and ends up having a heart to heart talk with Mystique, whose persona is still in her head after the events in "Messiah Complex".

=== Young X-Men ===
Cyclops takes Sunspot and Danielle as mentors of the Young X-Men. After establishing an abandoned cathedral in San Francisco as their new base, the Young X-Men (along with mentors Danielle Moonstar and Sunspot) form their team which includes Ink, Anole, Rockslide, and Dust, but without Blindfold.

=== Manifest Destiny ===
Iceman lands at a hospital after taking a flight with Opal Tanaka, who reveals herself to be Mystique. Disguised as a doctor, Mystique injects Iceman with a neural inhibitor but he manages to escape and flee on a truck. Mystique finds him yet again and destroys the truck, much to the truck driver's dismay. Iceman saves him and asks him to contact the X-Men, while he faces off with Mystique and tells her to shoot him while looking him in the eyes.

Other short stories include:

- Boom-Boom being defeated by Nuwa but taking her revenge by using coffee.
- Karma failing to possess Emma Frost and realizing she needs to get her focus back.
- Juggernaut hesitating between a life of crime or as a hero.
- Emma Frost coming to terms with the fact that the X-Men have accepted her.
- Anole and Graymalkin bonding over their sexuality while Beast explores Graymalkin's history.
- Wolverine and Nightcrawler failing to cheer up Colossus, whose mood lightens when he helps a girl save her kitty.
- X-23 helping Mercury realize she is more than just quicksilver and no one can tell her she is not a person after she defeats some Hellfire Cult members.
- Nightcrawler being depressed over his lack of use as an X-Men and confiding it in a Danger Room created Kitty hologram.

=== Eternals/X-Men Manifest Destiny ===
The last three issues of the short Eternals (vol. 4) run sees the relocation of the X-Men to San Francisco collide with Ikaris, his war with Druig, and the sentinel in Golden Gate Park. The final issue sees the X-Men assist with repelling the Horde which has been foreshadowed as coming since the last issue of Eternals (vol. 3) by Neil Gaiman.

== Issues ==
The following issues are related to the storyline:

- Astonishing X-Men #25-30
- Cable #6
- Eternals (vol. 4) #7-9
- Manifest Destiny: Nightcrawler (previously announced as X-Men: Quitting Time)
- Secret Invasion: X-Men #1-4
- Uncanny X-Men #500-507
- Wolverine: Manifest Destiny #1-4
- X-Men: Legacy #215-216
- X-Men: Manifest Destiny #1-5
- Young X-Men #6-9
- Runaways (Vol. 3) # 10

== Reading order ==
This is the reading order based on the release date of the issues:

=== July 2008 ===
- Astonishing X-Men #25
- Uncanny X-Men #500

=== August 2008 ===
- Cable #6
- Secret Invasion: X-Men #1
- Astonishing X-Men #26
- Uncanny X-Men #501
- X-Men: Legacy #215

=== September 2008 ===
- X-Men: Manifest Destiny #1
- Secret Invasion: X-Men #2
- Uncanny X-Men #502
- Young X-Men #6
- X-Men: Legacy #216

=== October 2008 ===
- X-Men: Manifest Destiny #2
- Astonishing X-Men #27
- Uncanny X-Men #503
- Young X-Men #7
- Wolverine: Manifest Destiny #1
- Secret Invasion: X-Men #3

=== November 2008 ===
- X-Men: Manifest Destiny #3
- Uncanny X-Men #504
- Young X-Men #8
- Secret Invasion: X-Men #4

=== December 2008 ===
- Wolverine: Manifest Destiny #2
- X-Men: Manifest Destiny #4
- Uncanny X-Men #505
- Young X-Men #9
- Wolverine: Manifest Destiny #3

=== January 2009 ===
- X-Men: Manifest Destiny #5
- Eternals #7
- Astonishing X-Men #28

=== February 2009 ===
- Wolverine: Manifest Destiny #4
- Eternals #8
- Uncanny X-Men #506

=== March 2009 ===
- Manifest Destiny: Nightcrawler #1
- Eternals #9
- Uncanny X-Men #507
- Astonishing X-Men #29

=== May 2009 ===
- Runaways (Vol. 3) #10

=== June 2009 ===
- Astonishing X-Men #30

== Collected editions ==
The storyline was collected into a number of volumes:

- Uncanny X-Men: Manifest Destiny (collects Uncanny X-Men #500-503, "X-Men Free Comic Book Day", and Manifest Destiny #1-5, 208 pages, April 2009, ISBN 0-7851-3817-X, softcover, November 2009, ISBN 0-7851-2451-9)
- X-Men: Manifest Destiny (collects Wolverine: Manifest Destiny #1-4, "X-Men Manifest Destiny: Nightcrawler" and X-Men: Manifest Destiny #1-5, 200 pages, hardcover, June 2009, ISBN 0-7851-3818-8, softcover, September 2009, ISBN 0-7851-3518-9)
- Eternals Volume 2 (includes Eternals (vol. 4) #7-9, softcover, 104 pages, September 2009, ISBN 0-7851-2979-0)
- Astonishing X-Men Vol. 5: Ghost Box (includes Astonishing X-Men (Vol. 3) #25–30 & Astonishing X-Men: Ghost Boxes #1–2, softcover, December 2009, ISBN 0-7851-2788-7)
- Secret Invasion: X-Men (includes Secret Invasion: X-Men #1-4, March 2009, ISBN 0-7851-3343-7)
