= Wolverine and the X-Men (comics) =

Comic book series

- Cover of Wolverine and the X-Men #1 (December 2011). Art by Chris Bachalo & Tim Townsend

Publication information
- Publisher: Marvel Comics
- Schedule: Monthly
- Format: Ongoing series
- Genre: Superhero
- Publication date: List: (vol. 1) December 2011 – February 2014 (vol. 2) May 2014 – January 2015
- No. of issues: (vol. 1): 42 (vol. 2): 12
- Main character: X-Men

Creative team
- Created by: Jason Aaron; Chris Bachalo
- Written by: List: (vol. 1) Jason Aaron (vol. 2) Jason Latour
- Penciller: List: (vol. 1) Chris Bachalo Nick Bradshaw Ramon Perez Pepe Larraz (vol. 2) Mahmud Asrar
- Inker: List: (vol. 1) Tim Townsend Jaime Mendoza Walden Wong
- Colorist: List: (vol. 1) Jason Keith Justin Ponsor Laura Martin Matt Milla (vol. 2) Israel Silva

Wolverine and the X-Men is an American comic book series published by Marvel Comics between 2011 and 2015. The title features the character Wolverine in his role as the headmaster of Jean Grey School for Higher Learning, the students of the school, and various members of the mutant superhero team, the X-Men, who serve as professors of the school.

== Publication history ==
During the 2011 crossover X-Men: Regenesis, Wolverine leaves Utopia with a group of X-Men and students. They group moves back to Westchester, New York, where they found the Jean Grey School for Higher Learning.

The initial issues of Wolverine and the X-Men mainly features the Jean Grey School and its faculty and students. The main antagonist in the book is a new Hellfire Club made up of homicidal genius children, led by Kade Kilgore. Starting from issue #9 the series became a tie-in to the Avengers vs. X-Men event until issue #18, except for issue #17 which featured a standalone story. Starting from issue #19, the series became part of the Marvel NOW! event. According to writer Jason Aaron, the book would follow the events of issue #18, in which the character Broo was shot in the head, and would return to the same type of stories that they were doing before Avengers vs. X-Men. "This is our first Marvel NOW! issue, issue #19, so if anything we're trying to get back to where we were before the 'AvX' madness. It picks up right after the events of 18. There were a lot of angry people on the Internet, which was great. It made my day.".

The first volume ended in February 2014 at issue #42. It was relaunched as a new volume 2 one week later by Jason Latour as part of the All-New Marvel NOW! event. With the death of Wolverine, the second volume ended with issue 12. It was followed by Spider-Man and the X-Men, a limited series set after Logan's death. In it, Spider-Man leads a Special Class while secretly investigating the students at Wolverine's request.

== Synopsis ==
=== Volume 1 ===
==== Regenesis ====
Wolverine leaves Cyclops' Utopia and founds the Jean Grey School of Higher Learning with Kitty Pryde, Beast, Iceman, and several other mutants as junior faculty and students. He also negotiates with Captain America to release Quentin Quire (Kid Omega) into his custody as a student. On the first day the NY State Board of Education is sent to approve the school's charter. However, the Hellfire Club attacks the school with Frankenstein monster clones and a Krakoa. This Krakoa eventually decides to join as an unofficial X-Man and the clones are subdued. Wolverine hires attorney Matt Murdock to sue Kade Kilgore, the Black King of the Hellfire Club and CEO of Kilgore, for damages following an attack. Beast brainwashes representatives of the New York State BOE to have them grant the school an educational charter.

Angel loses his board seat on Worthington Industries following a corporate coup initiated by the Hellfire Club. Wolverine realizes he cannot financially keep the school open and travels to a casino offworld with Quire. Kitty Pryde, who has been infested with the Brood, must defend the school from a mysterious bounty hunter/zoologist named Dr. Xanto Starblood. Wolverine does not make it back with the casino winnings, but it turns out Krakoa can create diamonds, so the school does not have any more financial problems.

==== Avengers vs X-Men ====
Soon the war between the Avengers and X-Men comes to the school. Wolverine initially stays neutral, but Cyclops comes to school to secretly recruit Rachel Summers, Iceman, Gambit, and Angel. Gladiator comes to the academy to return his son and kill the Phoenix, but is fended off by the Phoenix Force. Eventually, the Phoenix Force is defeated by Hope, but Broo is shot by Kade Kilgore while investigating Oya's mysterious new friend.

==== Marvel Now ====
Angel has returned to his family's Worthington Industries and hires Matt Murdock to prove the executives were planning to illegally obtain control. With the directors fired, Angel hires students from his A.P. economics class as his new board of directors. Angel is no longer interested in his business and decides to recruit new mutants for the school, he eventually travels to Brazil to enroll Iara Dos Santos, a.k.a. Shark-Girl after a scuffle with Mystique and Silver Samurai.

Kilgore establishes the Hellfire Academy with his first recruit, the mutant Mudcrab. Kitty also is too busy to run the school now that she is watching the time-displaced All-New X-Men. She hires Storm as new headmistress. The Murder Circus comes into town and brainwashes all the adults in Salem Center. The students are able to break the spell thanks to new student Eye-Boy. It turns out Frankenstein's Monster and Calcabria are searching for the last descendant of Victor Frankenstein, who is Baron Maximilian Frankenstein. After narrowly escaping and almost getting Oya killed twice, Max embraces his Frankenstein heritage. Now with some downtime, Kitty Pryde and Iceman go on a date. Storm argues with her ex-husband Black Panther during a tele-conference, then shares a passionate kiss with Wolverine.

Broo wakes up from his coma in a feral state. Wolverine decides to take Oya, Jia Jing, Broo, Quire, Glob Herman, Shark-Girl, and Eye-Boy to the Savage Land to teach them survival. Wolverine's brother Dog Logan kidnaps Wolverine and sets a trap for the students by teleporting cowboys from the past and androids from the future. His intention was to give the students "real life" training, but the students rebel. Eventually Wolverine rejoins the group, but refuses to fight Dog. One of the cowboys shoots at Dog and Quire stops the bullet even though Dog punched him minutes ago. Dog feels guilty and teleports out. Wolverine gathers all the students except Glob, who ran away before the battle. It turns out Wolverine expelled him on the plane ride over. Sauron recruits Glob for the Hellfire Academy.

Issue #29 flashes forward 25 years into the future. Wolverine is still headmaster of the school and opens a time capsule. He decides to change the past by sending his younger self a key to a special vault left behind by Dog Logan. Back in the present, Oya decides to join the Hellfire Academy. Beast travels to S.W.O.R.D. HQ to enlist Xanto Starblood in reinstating Broo's mind. Before he can help, the Philistine teleports Starblood and Broo away.

==== Hellfire Saga ====
Quire and Snot-Boy are teleported to a secret island by the Philistine and start their first day at the Hellfire Academy. The goal of the school is to create the next generation of villains, so Kilgore can sell more Sentinels. Quire finds Oya and vows to try to help her find Broo's assailant and then help escape. The Philistine, who received his powers from the Siege Perilous, can block Quire's telepathy and read his mind. They try to torture and weaken him so he can enter the Siege Perilous and transform. Toad has a change of heart and tries to free him. During the break out, Husk and the new Hellions try to stop them and Kilgore asks Oya to become the new Black Queen. She agrees only if he will kill Broo. Kilgore states that will be easy since he already shot him in the face. Wolverine uses the Bamfs to track down Lord Deathstrike, who he hopes knows the academy's location, but Beast realizes that Krakoa knows where the island is located and they follow him hidden island. Kilgore has other Krakoas created by Maximilian Frankenstein fight off the X-Men's Krakoa and Iceman, while Wolverine and the X-Men fight off the Academy's staff. As the Hellfire Club members begin to fight with each other, Toad begins to rip off all of Husk's layers until she regains her sanity. The Philistine then takes Wilhemina into the Siege, leaving Dog to rescue Kade Kilgore and the Bamfs rescuing the remaining students Manuel Enduque and Maximilian Frankenstein before the school is destroyed. The conclusion of the arc shows Manuel and Maximilian become new students at the Jean Grey School. Oya and Quire are now dating, Broo is cured of his feral state, and Kilgore is trapped in the Siege Perilous.

==== Battle of the Atom ====
The Jean Grey School is the center of the 10 issue crossover Battle of the Atom event.

==== Graduation ====
After the battle of the Atom, Maria Hill visits the school with a flotilla. Wolverine does not respond well to her show of force. He has Quire hack into S.H.I.E.L.D. database about a sentinel base. The Stepford Cuckoos also notice the hack and Cyclops investigates. Two new students, Joseph and Josephine Bricklemoore join the school, but it turns out that they are double agents working for Mystique. Joseph grows fond of the students and school, but Josephine does not want to fail S.H.I.E.L.D. because they may get sent back to the orphanage where they grew up. The other students figure out they are agents and are taking Mutant Growth Hormone. Josephine wants to fight her way out, but she is stunned by Joseph, who asks Quire to mind wipe them both. Wolverine and Cyclops defeat the sentinels base and have a heart-to-heart.

Toad gets fired as the school janitor for helping the Hellfire Club. He then helps Maximilian Frankenstein escape the school, but beats up Manuel. Manuel repeats a final message from Toad to Paige Guthrie, the new guidance counselor, who does not remember falling in love with Toad.

Issue 42 begins with graduation ceremony. Quire is upset he has not become the villain he always thought he will be. The issue incorporates flashforwards to an adult Oya and geriatric Logan. Logan has decided it is time to close the school.

The 2014 Annual takes place at the Shi'ar School for Superguardians, where Kubark is sent back to finish his training after being removed from the Jean Grey School. He is ostracized by other students for being different (he is the last Strontian and only member of his class, since classes are based on species). As the Builders attack the Shi'ar home planet all the sub-guardians, or students, are sent to battle, except Gladiator orders four Warbirds to guard Kubark back on the planet. Kubark breaks free from his wardens and joins the fray. He earns the respect of his fellow students after destroying a Builder battle ship and even steals a kiss from Smasher. His father relates to his solitude and allows him to return to the Jean Grey School.

=== Volume 2 ===
==== Tomorrow Never Learns ====
Edan Younge, CEO of the Phoenix Corporation, tries to recruit Quentin Quire and sends Faithful John to the school to kill Evan Sabahnur in order to prevent him from becoming Apocalypse. The team travels to the future with Fantomex to find out Quire will become the host of the Phoenix Force. With the help of Cyclops and new student Nature Girl, Faithful John is defeated, Evan is saved, and Younge is killed. However, Quire becomes the new CEO of Phoenix and abandons the school.

==== Death of Wolverine ====
During the "Death of Wolverine" storyline, Melita Gardner begins writing a biography on Wolverine's life and interviews the students. In a last ditch effort to turn him from an evil path, Wolverine infiltrates a Hellfire Club party and confronts Quire, but fails. Storm returns later and destroys the party pretending to be under Quire's control, thus putting him on probation with the Hellfire Club and undermining his plans.

== Characters ==
=== Jean Grey School for Higher Learning ===
Faculty
Headmistress
Storm
Senior Staff
Iceman	Northstar	Rachel Grey
Firestar	Nightcrawler	
Junior Staff
Chamber	Frenzy	Husk
Warbird
Adjunct Staff
Deathlok Prime	Doop	Toad
Recruiter
Angel
Students
Benjamin Deeds	Blindfold	Bling!
Broo	Cipher	Crosta
Dust	Ernst	Eye-Boy
Face	Genesis	Gentle
Glob Herman	Goldballs	Graymalkin
Hellion	Hijack	Indra
Kid Gladiator	Match	Mercury
No-Girl	Nature Girl	Oya
Primal	Rockslide	Scorpion Boy
Shark-Girl	Sprite (Jia Jing)	Stepford Cuckoos (Celeste, Mindee, and Phoebe)
Surge	Trance	Transonic
Triage	Velocidad	Ziggy Karst
Other Characters
Anole	Armor	Cecilia Reyes
Colossus	ForgetMeNot	Jubilee
Kid Omega	Krakoa	M
Magik	Pixie	Psylocke
Kavita Rao

== Collected editions ==
=== Volume 1 (2011 series) ===
Title	Material collected	Publication date	ISBN
Wolverine and the X-Men, Vol. 1	Wolverine and the X-Men (vol. 1) #1–4	May 2, 2012	978-0785156796
Wolverine and the X-Men: Alpha & Omega	Wolverine & the X-Men: Alpha & Omega (vol. 1) #1–5	July 2012	978-0785164005
Wolverine and the X-Men, Vol. 2	Wolverine and the X-Men (vol. 1) #5–8	September 5, 2012	978-0785156819
Wolverine and the X-Men, Vol. 3	Wolverine and the X-Men (vol. 1) #9–13	October 10, 2012	978-0785159995
Wolverine and the X-Men, Vol. 4	Wolverine and the X-Men (vol. 1) #14–18	January 8, 2013	978-0785165422
Wolverine and the X-Men, Vol. 5	Wolverine and the X-Men (vol. 1) #19–24	July 16, 2013	978-0785165774
Wolverine and the X-Men, Vol. 6	Wolverine and the X-Men (vol. 1) #25–29	September 24, 2013	978-0785165996
Wolverine and the X-Men, Vol. 7	Wolverine and the X-Men (vol. 1) #30–35	October 2013	978-0785166009
X-Men: Battle of the Atom	X-Men: Battle of the Atom (vol. 1) #1–2; All-New X-Men (vol. 1) 16–17; X-Men (vol. 4) #5–6; Uncanny X-Men (vol. 3) #12–13; Wolverine and the X-Men (vol. 1) #36–37	January 21, 2014	Hardcover: 978-0785189060 Paperback: 978-1846535727
Wolverine and the X-Men, Vol. 8	Wolverine and the X-Men (vol. 1) #38–42; Wolverine and the X-Men Annual (vol. 1) #1	September 24, 2013	978-0785166016
Wolverine & the X-Men by Jason Aaron Omnibus	Wolverine and the X-Men (vol. 1) #1–35 & 38–42; Wolverine and the X-Men Annual (vol. 1) #1	June 17, 2014	978-0785190240

=== Volume 2 (2014 series) ===
Title	Material collected	Publication date	ISBN
Wolverine and the X-Men, Volume 1: Tomorrow Never Learns	Wolverine and the X-Men (vol. 2) #1–6	November 18, 2014	Paperback: 978-0785189923
Wolverine and the X-Men, Volume 2: Death of Wolverine	Wolverine and the X-Men (vol. 2) #7–12	February 17, 2015	Paperback: 978-0785189930
