= X-Men: Messiah Complex =

Crossover storyline in Marvel Comics

"Messiah CompleX"
- Variant cover of X-Men: Messiah Complex 1 (Dec 2007), art by Marc Silvestri
- Publisher: Marvel Comics
- Publication date: October 2007 – January 2008
- Genre: Superhero; Crossover
Title(s)
New X-Men vol. 2, #44-46
The Uncanny X-Men #492-494
X-Factor vol. 3, #25-27
X-Men vol. 2, #205-207
X-Men: Messiah Complex #1
X-Men: Messiah Complex - Mutant Files #1
Marvel Spotlight X-Men: Messiah Complex #1
- Main character(s): X-Men; X-Factor Investigations; X-Force; New X-Men; Marauders; Acolytes; Purifiers; Predator X Reavers; Cable; Forge; Hope Summers; Mister Sinister

Creative team
- Writer(s): Ed Brubaker, Mike Carey, Peter David, Craig Kyle and Christopher Yost
- Penciller(s): Marc Silvestri, Billy Tan, Scot Eaton, Humberto Ramos and Chris Bachalo
- Inker(s): Joe Weems w/Marco Galli, Danny Miki w/Allan Martinez, John Dell, Carlos Cuevas, Tim Townsend w/Victor Olazaba, Jon Sibal, Andrew Hennessy, Dave Meikis and Al Vey
- Colorist(s): Frank D'Armata, Edgar Delgado and Brian Reber
- Hardcover: ISBN 0-7851-2899-9
- Softcover: ISBN 0-7851-2320-2

X-Men: Messiah Complex (also known as Messiah CompleX) is an American comic book crossover storyline published by Marvel Comics from October 2007 to January 2008, which ran through the various X-Men books.

The story is the climax of events that began with House of M, which led to the decimation of mutants in the Marvel Universe, and the first chapter of a three-part saga, which continued in Messiah War, released in 2009, and culminated in Second Coming, a crossover between all X-Men titles in early 2010.

== Overview ==
The "Messiah Complex" storyline is the climax of events set into motion in House of M and defined the direction of the X-Men franchise for the next several years. The storyline's main plot involves the birth of the first child with the X-gene since Decimation, sparking a race between the X-Men, the Marauders, the Acolytes, the Reavers, the Purifiers, and Predator X to see who will find the child first. The event marked the return of X-Man Angel, who had been away from the X-Men teams for a while. "Messiah Complex" also involves X-Factor and New X-Men, Sentinel Squad O*N*E*, and Cable.

== Plot ==
A mutant activation is detected in Alaska and Cyclops and several X-Men investigate, discovering bodies of Purifiers and Marauders. After discovering the source of the battle was for possession of a newborn baby, the group returns home and Cyclops seizes control of the X-Men from Professor X while Predator X detects the newborn mutant, and devours the bodies of the dead Marauders present.

Cyclops creates an "assault team" (consisting of Wolverine, Storm, Colossus, Angel, and Nightcrawler) with the intent of locating the Marauders, who have a comatose Rogue captive. Cyclops sends X-Factor leader Multiple Man and member Layla Miller to visit Forge, and has member Rictor (who lost his powers on M-Day) pretend to join the Purifiers to see if they have the baby. Forge tells Madrox that Scarlet Witch's hex spell flatlined mutants across all possible futures until the baby's birth, which spawned two futures with mutants present. Madrox sends a duplicate to each timeline, and Layla Miller runs in the portal with the second dupe as Madrox falls comatose and Forge takes care of his body.

Rictor joins the Purifiers and discovers they are working with Lady Deathstrike and the Reavers, and that they do not have the baby, as a group of New X-Men attack the Purifiers base. In the fight, Hellion is wounded and in an escape, Pixie accidentally scatter-teleports Rictor and her friends. The assault team track the Marauders to Alaska and attack them with Emma Frost's assistance, until Hellion's wounding leads to the assault team's defeat and Nightcrawler's injury. In New York, the O*N*E* Sentinels are infected by nano-Sentinels and turn on the X-Men, but they are defeated when Iceman returns with the scattered New X-Men. When the assault team returns and Wolverine tells Cyclops he learned Cable has the baby, Cyclops assumes his son used the nano-Sentinels to attack them for some reason, so he dispatches a new X-Force (consisting of Wolverine, Hepzibah, Warpath, Caliban, X-23, and Wolfsbane) to locate him. Cable wanders Alaska with the baby while Predator X continues killing mutants, making his way to the X-Mansion when it loses the baby's scent.

In the future, Layla and Madrox discover there are mutant concentration camps, a result of mutant activity, and they get themselves locked in one and permanently marked with "M" DNA face tattoos. In present day, X-Force finds Cable, who is battling Deathstrike and the Reavers. X-23 defeats Deathstrike at the cost of Caliban's life, and Cable steals X-Force's Blackbird, making a path for Texas, where he goes to Forge's headquarters to use a time traveling device. Cable is hit from behind by X-Man Bishop, who in the future, Madrox and Layla discover would kill the mutant "messiah" since she killed a million people and lead to the camps' creation. Bishop is ambushed by the Marauders, who take the baby to Muir Island under Gambit's leadership. Once on Muir Island, it is revealed that Mister Sinister, who has the baby, is actually Mystique and that Mister Sinister is dead by her forcing him to touch Rogue.

Cerebro is repaired and used to track Gambit as Cyclops rescues X-Force, Bishop and Madrox. Bishop says Cable knocked Forge out and ran away after both him and Cable lost the baby. Cyclops sends Bishop and X-Force ahead to Muir Island in a faster O*N*E* ship. After they leave, Madrox reawakens after Layla uses a stolen grenade to kill his duplicate and send future Madrox's memories to Madrox Prime, now with the duplicate's M scar. He tells the group about Bishop. Predator X arrives at the X-Mansion and fights the New X-Men until Pixie teleports them to Muir Island, and Cable uses his stolen Blackbird to get Xavier to help him, explaining that in his future, the baby was a Messiah who united all of man and mutantkind.

Mystique explains to Gambit that Destiny, her former lover, had told her about the baby and that it would heal Rogue. She holds the baby to Rogue's lips, and Gambit removes her hand, saying Rogue would not want an innocent to die for her, as the Marauders and Acolytes battle X-Force and the newly arrived X-Men. Professor X interrupts Gambit, coming in with Cable, and when Cable gets the baby again, Bishop walks in along with Predator X, and the mutant killer bites Bishop's arm off, and is killed by Wolverine. Rogue awakens and disowns Mystique as punishment for risking a baby's life, then touches her before realizing that the baby wiped her memories away. She leaves Gambit, along with her and Mystique's memories. Cyclops demands that Cable hand over the child, and Professor X, in a sudden change, tells Cable to do it, so that Scott can see what everyone has been fighting for. Cyclops remembers what it was like to lose Nathan, and tells Cable to take the baby and give it the chance Cyclops never gave his own son. An infuriated Bishop takes Scalphunter's gun and shoots as Cable timeslides to the future, missing him and hitting Professor X. In retaliation, Cyclops takes out Bishop with a powerful optic blast. After Professor X is shot, his body is teleported away as Cyclops declares there are no X-Men.

Afterwards, Cable appears in the future, with the baby in his arms. The story ends as Cable thinks to himself, "here comes the hard part".

== Publication ==
October 2007

- Chapter 1: X-Men: Messiah Complex one-shot.

November 2007

- Chapter 2: Uncanny X-Men #492
- Chapter 3: X-Factor #25
- Chapter 4: New X-Men #44
- Chapter 5: X-Men #205

December 2007

- Chapter 6: Uncanny X-Men #493
- Chapter 7: X-Factor #26
- Chapter 8: New X-Men #45
- Chapter 9: X-Men #206

January 2008

- Chapter 10: Uncanny X-Men #494
- Chapter 11: X-Factor #27
- Chapter 12: New X-Men #46
- Chapter 13: X-Men #207

=== Additional books ===
- X-Men: Messiah Complex - Mutant Files #1

=== Collected editions ===
The storyline has been collected into a single volume:

- X-Men: Messiah Complex (collects "X-Men: Messiah CompleX", Uncanny X-Men #492-494, X-Men #205-207, New X-Men #44-46, X-Factor #25-27, and "X-Men: Messiah CompleX - Mutant Files", 352 pages, Marvel Comics, hardcover, April 2008, ISBN 0-7851-2899-9, softcover, November 2008, ISBN 0-7851-2320-2)

== Aftermath and consequences ==
Since Mystique risked the baby's life by touching it to Rogue, Rogue disowned her foster mother, but only after touching her before realizing the baby's touch cleansed her of her gained memories from a lifetime of touching. Rogue left, wanting time alone.

Divided We Stand: The "Divided We Stand" event followed on from the end of Messiah Complex, with the X-Men no longer being a team, and encompassed the Uncanny X-Men, X-Factor, X-Force, Young X-Men, X-Men: Legacy, Wolverine, and Cable ongoing series.

Uncanny X-Men: A separate Divided We Stand storyline ran in Uncanny X-Men from #495 to 500 and ended with the X-Men reforming in San Francisco and pursuing "Cyclops’ vision of what the X-Men should do".

Cable: At the Baltimore Comic-Con on September 10, 2007, Marvel Comics announced that a new solo Cable ongoing series (replacing Cable & Deadpool), with Duane Swierczynski as the writer and Ariel Olivetti as the artist, would be launched after the conclusion of Messiah Complex in March 2008. This series followed the attempts of Cable to protect the Messiah child from Bishop.

X-Men (vol. 2): X-Men (vol. 2) was renamed X-Men: Legacy as of issue #208 in February 2008. Mike Carey remained as writer with various artists contributing to the art, including CompleX artist Billy Tan and Scot Eaton, among others, with David Finch as the cover artist. The book turned to a focus on Professor Xavier, Rogue and Gambit, and featured plans regarding Magneto, as well as a female character from the New X-Men title.

X-Force: A new X-Force series was launched in February 2008 with Craig Kyle and Christopher Yost as the writers and Clayton Crain as the artist. The team consists of the X-Force team introduced in "CompleX", minus the ones that died and the ones that suffered injuries.

X-Factor saw Layla Miller remain trapped in the future. Additionally, two of Madrox's duplicates were sent into future alternate realities. One duplicate traveled into the future with Miller and found himself in Bishop's future. The other duplicate returned as an X-Factor character with the ability to possess others using techno-organic abilities named Cortex.

New X-Men (formerly New X-Men: Academy X): A new series, titled Young X-Men, debuted in April 2008 with Marc Guggenheim as the writer and Yanick Paquette as the artist and will replace the New X-Men series, which was cancelled with issue #46 in January 2008. The team consisted of Dust, Rockslide, Blindfold, Wolf Cub, and Anole (from the cancelled New X-Men series), as well as new members Ink and Graymalkin.

== Sequels ==
Messiah War, a seven-issue crossover between Cable (vol. 2) and X-Force (vol. 3) which writer Craig Kyle describes as being the follow-up to Messiah Complex and a middle chapter for a three-part saga of great significance to the world of the X-Men in the future.

X-Men: Second Coming, was the final part of the trilogy that began with Messiah Complex and Messiah War, intended as a conclusion to Cable's efforts to save Hope from Bishop, who has hunted the so-called Mutant Messiah since her birth.
