= Age of X =

Marvel Comics storyline

- Variant cover of Age of X: Alpha #1 (Jan. 2011); Art by Olivier Coipel
- Publisher: Marvel Comics
- Publication date: January – May 2011
- Genre: Superhero; Crossover
Title(s)
- Age of X: Alpha
- Age of X: Universe #1–2
- New Mutants vol. 2 #22–24
- X-Men: Legacy #245–249
- Main characters: New Mutants; X-Men; Magneto

Creative team
- Writer: Mike Carey
- Pencillers: Clay Mann; Steve Kurth
- Inkers: Jay Leisten; Allen Martinez
- Colorist: Brian Reber

"Age of X" is a comic book storyline published by Marvel Comics as part of its X-Men series. The storyline is set in an alternate reality known as Earth-11326. Running from January to April 2011, it is similar in name and tone to the 1995 "Age of Apocalypse" storyline.

== Plot ==
=== Background ===
After the announcement of the storyline in December 2010, Marvel added QR codes on selected comics. These codes were linked to five different historical logs, each providing background for "Age of X".

- Log 1A: Henry McCoy is killed by anti-mutant protestors during the March For Purity in Washington, D.C.
- Log 2B: Jean Grey's mutant abilities manifest in the form of a phoenix that destroys Albany, New York, killing 600,000 people.
- Log 3C: Following the destruction of Albany, Exonim Sentinels are created to subdue mutants. In the months that follow, the mutant population drastically declines; this period becomes known as "the Decimation".
- Log4D: As anti-mutant hysteria spreads, mutants are required to be imprisoned and, in most cases, executed. When Wolfsbane, a fugitive mutant under the protection of Reed Richards, accidentally injures Franklin Richards, Susan Storm reports Reed to the authorities. To demonstrate that no one is above the law, the Fantastic Four are publicly arrested.
- Log5E: The Avengers are assembled to track down the remaining free mutants, who are believed to be among the most powerful mutants left.

=== Main story ===
The mutants are almost extinct, tortured by a strike force led by Colonel Graydon Creed. The primary event occurs 1,000 days after Magneto moved most of the mutants to Fortress X, their last bastion. Human forces are trying to reach the citadel; although they have always failed to do so, they have inflicted many casualties on the mutants. Legacy/Rogue acts as a "Reaper", storing the thoughts of those killed in battle. After one of her reapings, Legacy sees the capture of Shadowcat (who was returning from a mission in the outside world). Rogue finds the camera which Shadowcat is trying to hide, and discovers that all the pictures in it are blank. Using Madison Jeffries's absorbed powers, Legacy infiltrates the X-Brig (Fortress X's detention facility) to question Shadowcat. There she is seen by Blindfold of Earth-616, who hints that this reality is "wrong" and asks her to ask Professor X about the "scar tissue". As she speaks with Shadowcat and touches a comatose Xavier, Legacy begins a mental attack on every mutant inside the fortress; seen by Danger, she becomes a fugitive. Hunted by Danielle Moonstar's Cadre, she is saved by Gambit. They are attacked by Magneto, who fakes their deaths and explains that he sent Shadowcat out to investigate because he is convinced something is wrong. As Magneto returns to the brig to free Shadowcat and Professor X, X (the voice controlling Fortress X) sends the Cadre after him. Gambit and Legacy (who are in the room at the center of the fortress) discover that their universe has been stolen and is kept in a box. When Professor X is freed, he telepathically shows his pursuers and a reluctant Legion the truth about himself and the reality in which they think they are living. The Age of X was created when Legion's mind reacted to Doctor Nemesis's attempt to restore it to sanity. A new persona (with new powers) was born, creating a new reality to protect Legion's personalities. This manifestation of Legion's power assumed the appearance of Moira MacTaggert to confuse Xavier and protect Legion. MacTaggert confronted Legacy and Gambit, revealing that she is also X. Cornered by Xavier, X launches a last offensive on the fortress.

MacTaggert removes the walls, allowing the humans to enter the fortress. Legion appears, while Xavier, Magneto and Shadowcat try to stop MacTaggert, who created the universe so Legion could be the hero he always wanted to be. Weeping in his arms, she promises to create as many universes for him as he wants. While MacTaggert is distracted, Legion absorbs her back into his body and erases all the humans fighting the mutants. He goes to the battlefield, apologizes and rewrites the universe (returning everything to the way it was). The entire timeline lasts for seven days in reality and the mutants return to Utopia with the memory of their 616 lives; Xavier and Emma Frost reveal that the telepaths will help anyone who wants to lose their Age of X memories.

== Characters ==
=== Heroes ===
The mutant resistance was formed by Magneto to protect the surviving mutants from Graydon Creed and his mutant-hunters:

- Cannonball – Labeled a traitor by his sister, Husk, when he convinced her there was not enough time to avenge the murder of their family. Husk forced him to create X-Force before joining Magneto.
- Cyclops – Known as "Basilisk," he was forced by prison warden Arcade to kill his brother and dozens of mutants. Additionally, his eyelids were removed, leading him to be unable to control his powers and forcing him to wear a mask to contain his optic blasts. After escaping from prison, Basilisk kills Arcade and joins Magneto. He is married to Joanna Cargill.
- Dazzler – After being attacked by Exonim soldiers during a concert, Dazzler retreated to the Manhattan sewers. She was later tracked down and teleported to Fortress X by Doctor Strange, becoming one of Magneto's soldiers.
- Force Warriors – Five psionically powered mutants who protect the walls of Fortress X by channeling their powers to create force walls.
  - Hellion
  - Revenant – At first, Revenant's past is unknown and she is amnesiac. When reality is restored, she is revealed to be Rachel Summers.
  - Legion – Unlike his main universe counterpart, Legion shows no sign of instability or multiple powers. He only displays telekinesis (a power belonging to his personality Jack Wayne).
  - Psylocke – Here, Betsy never switched bodies with Kwannon. She possesses telekinetic abilities and she is romantically involved with Iceman.
  - Carmella Unuscione
- Frenzy – In this universe, Frenzy is married to Cyclops. Unlike nearly all of the others, Frenzy chooses to retain her memories of the Age of X universe, which influence her to join the X-Men.
- Gambit
- Husk – With her brother Cannonball, she tried to save her family (who had been arrested), only to find them murdered. Cannonball refused to avenge his family by killing the guards, forming a rift with Husk.
- Iceman – Romantically involved with Psylocke.
- Madison Jeffries – Jeffries spends most of his time in the Fortress X observatory, unsuccessfully trying to measure starlight. His theories relate to the box containing the universe later found by Gambit and Legacy.
- Magneto – The leader of the mutant resistance.
- Moonstar's Cadre – The Fortress X hunters. When Legacy escapes from the brig and Magneto suspected of betrayal, they are the designated team for the missions.
  - Cypher – Captured and imprisoned in a prison on the Pacific coast, Cypher escaped and joined Magneto. Cypher is bonded to an unidentified alien matter similar in appearance to the main universe's Warlock.
  - Dust – First appeared hiding with mutants before being rescued by Magneto, she later joins the Moonstar Cadre. This version of Dust is harsher, crueler and more lenient in her Muslim beliefs.
  - Karma
  - Magma – Came from Brazil via Mexico to join Magneto in Nevada.
  - Danielle Moonstar – Leader and the tracker of the team. Nothing is known about her mutant powers here.
  - Sunspot – Known as Eclipse in this reality.
- Mystique – The adoptive mother of Rogue. After being captured by the Sapien League, Mystique escapes and returns to Fortress X, where she is killed by Captain America.
- Namor – Left the oceans to live in Fortress X and follow Storm, his love interest here.
- Pixie – Known as "Nightmare" after the Bleecker Street massacre, gaining bat-like wings. She travels to Fortress X, joining Magneto.
- Rogue – Known here as "Legacy," Magneto chooses her to keep the memory of the mutants by absorbing their dying memories (hence her nickname, "Reaper").
- Storm – In a relationship with Namor. She was mentioned as the leader of the Storm Cadre.
- Tempo – Died defending Fortress X against a human attack. Before coming there, Tempo and Frenzy were members of the Mutant Liberation Front.
- Wolverine – Seen in flashback as weakened after Kavita Rao injects him with several doses of a serum designed to cure the mutant gene, counting on his healing factor to destroy the cure. He is unable to fight, since his powers are focused on keeping him alive despite his adamantium infection.

Other X-Men characters appear in the storyline in marginal roles and as inhabitants of Fortress X, including Angel, Anole, Avalanche, Beak, Bling!, Chamber, Colossus, Cecilia Reyes, Domino, Forge, Gentle, Indra, Jubilee, Lady Mastermind, Loa, Martinique Jason, Northstar, Rockslide, Scalphunter, Surge, Toad, Trance, Vertigo, and Warpath (here known as Berserker).

=== X-Brig mutants ===
Dangerous mutants are locked in Fortress X's X-Brig. Most have telepathic powers and wear helmets to inhibit them. X used the brig to imprison Professor X, who knew his true nature and convinced the other mutants that telepathic powers cannot exist; if they did, they would be very dangerous. On Magneto's orders, Danger is the only warden of the brig and runs it with several drone copies of herself. Among the inmates are:

- Blindfold – The Earth-616 Blindfold who knows that this reality should not exist.
- Emma Frost
- Magik
- Martha Johansson
- Professor X – Initially shown in a comatose state. After being freed by Shadowcat and Magneto, Professor X retains knowledge of the Earth-616 reality.
- Shadowcat
- Stepford Cuckoos

=== Villains ===
- Arcade: Arcade is the prison governor of the mutant prison until he is killed by Basilisk.
- Frank Castle – Multi-decorated chief of the Avengers, Castle orders the killing of the occupants of Fortress X.
- Avengers – The Avengers are a group tasked with hunting mutants. During their assault on Fortress X, the Avengers discover a group of mutant children, and abandon their mission. It is revealed to them that their purpose is to carry out a suicide mission, and the team sacrifice their lives to protect the mutant refugees from the Hulk.
  - Captain America – Leader of the Avengers, Captain America struggles to control his team. During the mission, he kills a mutant who was protecting a group of mutant children. Realizing his mistake, he calls off the mission and leads the Avengers to defend Fortress X. He is killed battling the Hulk, but his words and actions inspire the mutant forces to band together. Legacy absorbs his memories to honor his sacrifice.
  - Ghost Rider – Apparently killed by Chamber on his first mission.
  - Hulk – Bruce Banner was involved in mutant experiments for the government. During a sterilization experiment, a prisoner panicked causing the device to explode and transforming Banner into the Hulk. Immediately after his transformation, Banner killed his colleagues and his fiancée Betty Ross, causing him to develop a hatred of mutants. His role in the Avengers is a contingency plan, should they fail in their mission. The Hulk is killed by Redback while trying to deliver a chemical bomb to Fortress X.
  - Invisible Woman – After her son Franklin Richards was nearly attacked by Wolfsbane, she exposed her to the mutant hunters and the rest of the Fantastic Four were arrested for harboring a mutant. She later joined the Avengers. She is determined to stop her fellow Avengers from killing mutants, apparently out of remorse for what she did to the rest of the Fantastic Four. She is killed by the Hulk while trying to protect Fortress X from a military assault.
  - Iron Man – Tony Stark was infected with a virus after a confrontation with Madison Jeffries and merged with his suit. When the team calls off the mission, an emergency override takes over his armor and tries to kill the mutant children in the room. At his request, Captain America kills Iron Man.
  - Spider-Woman – Here, Spider-Woman is known as Redback. A silent, coldblooded killer, she follows orders and was responsible for killing Mr. Sinister. She finally speaks after the discovery of the mutant children in Fortress X, saying that their mission is "wrong". After Sue is killed by the Hulk Redback uses Iron Man's severed glove to detonate the explosive, killing herself and Banner.
- Richard Palance (Pandemic) – Palance is shown working with Dr. Kavita Rao on a mutant cure, before Rao kills him in a confrontation with Wolverine.
- Exonim – A robotic strike-force team which hunts mutants under Graydon Creed's orders, this storyline's version of the Sentinels.
- Graydon Creed – The unseen Creed is a colonel who led the mutant hunters in an attempt to exterminate them.
- X – The only female villain in the AoX, she is the voice controlling Fortress X and creator of the army the mutants must fight daily. Born as a new, unknown personality, she is a reaction to Doctor Nemesis's work on Legion's mind; Nemesis was trying to restore Legion's sanity by isolating him and purging all his personalities. X killed all the imprisoned personalities, using them (and all the minds in Utopia) to create a new environment where Legion would be happy and known as a hero. Xavier suspected that Legion's mind was trying to rebel, and tried to fight X in Legion's mind. X assumed the appearance of Moira MacTaggert to confuse him, and imprisoned everyone inside Fortress X. X became the guardian voice of Fortress X, using her appearance as MacTaggert to control Legion and revealing that she kept the old universe safe for sentimental reasons. X tries to destroy the original universe, but is stopped when Legion sees what she has done for him. He reabsorbs her into his mind, using her powers to restore reality to normal.

=== Other characters ===
- Angel Salvadore – Retreated to the sewers of Manhattan as a fugitive with Dazzler and Gabriel Cohuelo. After being tracked down by Doctor Strange, she is teleported to Fortress X with her two companions.
- Beast – Hank McCoy was beaten to death by anti-mutant protesters during the March of Purity.
- Callisto – Prisoner on Alcatraz who is freed by Basilisk when he escapes. She later goes to Fortress X.
- Camp Gorge's Mutants – The following characters were seen in Camp Gorge during a prison riot:
  - Blob
  - Maggott – Killed by Iron Man.
  - Mammomax
  - Marrow
  - Omega Red
  - Riptide
  - Rusty Collins
- Copycat – Copycat infiltrates Cannonball's X-Force until she is unmasked and killed by Husk.
- Destiny – Died in custody.
- Doctor Nemesis – He us seen frozen and distorted in a room unknown to Magneto at the center of Fortress X.
- Doctor Strange – A mutant-hunter for hire. He is actually a double agent (working with Magneto) who teleports mutants to Fortress X.
- Elixir – Elixir is among the mutants captured by the Sapien League and presented as a dangerous mutant.
- Fantastic Four – Mister Fantastic, Human Torch and Thing were arrested by the mutant hunters when they were informed by Invisible Woman that they harbored Wolfsbane.
- Guthrie Family – Killed by a trigger-happy guard, but no one was prosecuted since two mutants had been born into the family.
- Gabriel Cohuelo – Retreated to the sewers of Manhattan as a fugitive with Dazzler and Angel Salvadore. After being tracked down by Doctor Strange, he is teleported to Fortress X with his two companions and begins using the codename "Velocidad".
- Havok – Killed by his brother Basilisk.
- Jean Grey – Grey's Phoenix Force ability manifested, causing destruction and death in Albany. Although she was presumed dead when air forces bombed the area, a phoenix emerged from the rubble.
- Kavita Rao – Living in Fortress X, she became a traitor to humanity when she sided with the mutants.
- Mary Jane Watson – Spider-Man's wife here, she is a fugitive who is pregnant with a baby girl. Spider-Man sends her to Paris (to avoid arrest for being pregnant with a potentially superhuman infant) while her fetus was small enough to escape detection.
- Masque
- Mister Sinister – Sinister was killed by Redback.
- Moira MacTaggert – One of the few humans allowed to live in Fortress X because of her sympathy with the mutant cause. Legion's stepmother found MacTaggert a place in the Fortress. Revealed to be X, the voice controlling Fortress X and creator of this reality.
- Neophyte – Provided information on Legacy and Magento.
- Onyxx – Recruited to Magneto's cause by Nightmare.
- Polaris – Suspected to be Magneto's daughter, a prisoner of Alcatraz who died while trying to escape.
- Pyro – Killed by Redback during a raid on Fortress X.
- Quicksilver – Although he was shown still alive fighting the Exonim that killed his sister, it is implied that he was among those killed by Exonim during the Decimation.
- Sabretooth – Sabretooth is among the mutants captured by the Sapien League and presented as a dangerous mutant. Later, he is made a tracker for the Avengers in exchange for his freedom. Known by the Avengers as Weapon-S, his jaw is replaced with two metallic tusks. Sabretooth is killed by Hulk when the Avengers find Fortress X.
- Scarlet Witch – She was among those killed by Exonim during the Decimation.
- Siryn – Subject of Bruce Banner's experiment who caused the accident turning Banner into the Hulk. She was killed in the ensuing explosion.
- Spider-Man – Spider-Man is married to Mary Jane Watson and is hunted by the Human Coalition after their discovery of Nick Fury's Secret Warriors. Due to their powers, the coalition assumed they were mutants and the government extended its reach to "Post-Muties" (people whose offspring would be considered mutants). Captured by the coalition while buying time for Mary Jane to escape with their unborn daughter.
- Vulcan – Vulcan is in an induced coma at the Barton-Howell research facility.
- Wind Dancer – Recruited to Magneto's cause by Nightmare.
- Wolfsbane – Harbored by the Fantastic Four until she almost harmed Franklin Richards, leading Invisible Woman to report her to the mutant hunters.

== Issues ==
- Age of X: Alpha
- X-Men: Legacy #245–249
- New Mutants (vol. 3) #22–24
- Age of X: Universe #1–2

== Collected edition ==
Title	Material collected	Published date	ISBN
X-Men: Age of X	Age of X Alpha, X-Men Legacy #245-247, New Mutants (vol. 3) #22-24, Age of X Universe #1-2	July 2011	978-0785152897

== Reception ==
Age of X: Alpha received a rating of 7.5 out of 10 from IGN, and a rating of 3.5 out of 5 from Comic Book Resources. The reviews described it as a good setup, providing a framework for the rest of the series. X-Men: Legacy #245 received a rating of 3.5 out of 5 from Comic Book Resources.
