= Anole (character) =

Marvel Comics superhero

- Anole as depicted in New X-Men #43 (December 2007). Art by Skottie Young.

Publication information
- Publisher: Marvel Comics
- First appearance: New Mutants vol. 2 #2 (August 2003)
- Created by: Nunzio DeFilippis; Christina Weir; Carlo Barberi

In-story information
- Alter ego: Victor "Vic" Borkowski
- Species: Human mutant
- Team affiliations: Alpha Squadron training squad; Lost Club; New X-Men; Xavier Institute; X-Men in training; Young X-Men; Jean Grey School Students
- Abilities: Superhuman agility, speed, reflexes/reactions, coordination, and balance; Wall-crawling; Regeneration; Camouflage; Prehensile tongue

Anole (Victor Borkowski) is a mutant superhero appearing in American comic books published by Marvel Comics. He was created by Christina Weir and Nunzio DeFilippis and first appeared in issue #2 of New Mutants vol. 2 (August 2003). He was a student at the Xavier Institute and junior member of the X-Men. His reptilian mutation grants him superhuman abilities including wallcrawling, superhuman strength, a prehensile tongue, and adaptive camouflage.

Initially a supporting character in New Mutants vol. 2 and its relaunched title, New X-Men: Academy X, Weir and DeFilippis intended for the character to commit suicide early in the series after coming out as gay and finding himself rejected by his family and friends. According to the writers, the story was to serve as a message about intolerance. Marvel editors scrapped the story due to concerns about the controversy it might generate. The storyline was rewritten and the character survived. He has since become a fan favorite and began to be featured regularly throughout the series and as a main character in subsequent X-Men-related titles, including New X-Men and the short-lived Young X-Men.

During the Krakoan Age, Anole – now a young adult – becomes the co-owner and bartender of the tiki bar Green Lagoon on Krakoa. Following the X-Men: From the Ashes relaunch, Anole is one of the main characters of the second volume of NYX in July 2024, where he is now a bartender in New York City.

== Publication history ==
Victor Borkowski first appears in New Mutants vol. 2 #2 in August 2003. Christina Weir and Nunzio DeFilippis originally wrote a storyline for New Mutants that was to take place between issues 8 and 10. The plot involved Victor committing suicide after coming out as gay and being rejected by his parents and his friends, serving as "a powerful message about what intolerance can do to people." Due to the controversial subject matter, the storyline was dropped, with Victor coming from an accepting family and hometown.

Despite only rare initial appearances as a supporting character, Victor developed a fan following. Victor was given the codename "Anole" (/əˈnoʊliː/ ə-NOH-lee), a kind of lizard frequently and incorrectly known as an American chameleon, after it was suggested to Weir and DeFilippis by a fan via a post on their forum. He continued to make numerous appearances during Craig Kyle and Christopher Yost's run on New X-Men, having a more active role in the plots than most of the other background characters.

Anole was featured as a main character beginning in New X-Men vol. 2 #37, illustrated by comic book artist Skottie Young. He was later added to the New X-Men as a teammate. Anole was a "pretty early pick" for new additions to the team, according to Yost, who felt that Anole had a decent set of abilities and represented "a kind of level-headed, good, normal kid." Additionally, Yost and Kyle felt adding Anole and the character Pixie to the New X-Men team gave the roster "tonal balance" and the opportunity to slightly "twist and warp" the characters through darker events to come in the series. While alluded to since his first main appearances in the franchise and confirmed off-panel during their run by DiFilippis and Weir and in Marvel character profiles, it was during this series in New X-Men (2nd Series) #43 that Anole's gay identity was stated and dealt with explicitly on-panel for the first time.

When the series ended, Anole was featured in a vignette entitled "Blend In" written and illustrated by Young in X-Men: Divided We Stand #1. The story explored the effects of the darker events in Yost and Kyle's run on younger characters such as Anole, Young feeling that younger characters were often improperly characterized like mature adults in how they dealt with large, traumatic events in comic series. He described his decision to illustrate and write about Anole as "a natural choice" and that he wanted to flesh out his previously unknown backstory, claiming that drawing Anole for a year during his time on New X-Men allowed him to understand the character. In developing Anole's backstory, Young also established the character's hometown as his own—Fairbury, Illinois. Young added that he chose to write Anole's divestment from the X-Men at the conclusion of the story in a way that would allow him to explore more of the character's future decisions and experiences at another time. Anole would later reappear as a team member in the main cast of Young X-Men as of Young X-Men #6 and as a supporting character in X-Men franchise crossover events such as X-Men: Manifest Destiny, Secret Invasion: X-Men, and X-Men: Nation X.

Anole was featured in the story "Good Judy", published as part of the 2021 issue Marvel's Voices: Pride. In an interview with AIPT, writer Terry Blas compared Anole's struggle with his appearance and self-image to those faced by gay people, who may be harmed by trying to live up to a certain body type.

In April 2024, it was announced that Anole would have a starring role in the second volume of NYX (vol. 2), set for a July 2024 release as part of the "X-Men: From the Ashes" relaunch. It is written by Collin Kelly and Jackson Lanzing with art by Francesco Mortarino. The new ongoing series centers on Anole and several other mutant young adults – Kamala Khan, Laura Kinney, Sophie Cuckoo, and Prodigy – attempting to adapt to life in New York City in the post-Krakoan Age when mutants are hated and feared even more due to the actions of Orchis.

== Fictional character biography ==
=== Early life and arrival at Xavier's ===
Victor Borkowski is a sixteen-year-old mutant born and raised in Fairbury, Illinois, a small, typical American town in which he lives a normal life despite his reptilian features. The close-knit community accepts him until anti-mutant sentiment begins to spread. For his own safety, his parents send him to the Xavier Institute, where he excels academically.

When the advisor system is set up at the Xavier Institute, Victor chooses Karma as his advisor and is given the code name Anole. During the formation of training squads throughout the school, he is reassigned to Northstar's Alpha Squadron where he serves as the squad leader. At first, he is depicted as close friends with fellow student Julian Keller and the other students in the Hellions, but he later becomes closer to his teammates. He is especially close to his mentor Northstar, who helps him to come to terms with his sexuality. Anole is deeply affected by Northstar's death, stating that Northstar understood him and was important as a figure he could confide in.

=== Post M-Day ===
Anole is one of only 27 students at the Institute who does not lose his mutant powers in the aftermath of "House of M" (also known as Decimation or M-Day). The squad system is dissolved and the remaining students are merged into one group. Shortly afterward, Emma Frost sets up an all-out brawl amongst the remaining students to determine who will become the new team of X-Men trainees (dubbed the New X-Men); Victor is not selected for the squad, but remains at the school. When Northstar returns with his sister Aurora and attacks the Institute, Anole finds him and is able to temporarily snap him out of the mind control set in place by the Children of the Vault. Anole's joy at seeing his former mentor is short-lived, as Northstar returns to his mind-controlled status and knocks him out. The school is later attacked by William Stryker and his army of mutant-exterminating Purifiers, killing many of the students.

=== Joining the New X-Men ===
During the New X-Men story arc "The Quest for Magik," Anole and his classmates are sucked into the dimension of Limbo by the demon Belasco. They are soon attacked by a large group of demons, and Anole takes charge, rallying the students around the defenseless Blindfold, only to have his right arm cut off by a demon. Later he is trapped in stone by the machinations of Darkchilde as she attempts to create a Soulsword from Pixie's soul. Anole manages to break himself free and stop Darkchilde from completing the process, saving Pixie. Anole then finds that he has generated a larger and stronger reptilian arm replacing the one he lost, a previously unknown aspect of his mutation. After helping to defeat Belasco, Anole and Pixie are made members of the New X-Men squad on recommendation of Rockslide, who threatens to quit if they are not appointed to the team.

Rockslide and X-23 later try to convince Anole to cut off his other arm in order to generate a stronger replacement. When he refuses, Rockslide calls him a sissy, which Anole finds offensive enough for him to reveal his sexual identity to Rockslide and attack him. Rockslide apologizes, swearing that he did not know. Later, in a misguided attempt at group bonding, Rockslide voices his acceptance of Anole's sexuality, outing him to some of the other students, though Loa states that she was already aware and that everyone already knew.

As a member of the New X-Men, Anole takes part in various missions with the team, including the events leading up to X-Men: Messiah Complex and through to its conclusion when Cyclops officially closes the school and disbands the X-Men. With the school closed, Anole returns to his family in Fairbury, Illinois.

=== Divided We Stand ===
A vignette in the two-part series Divided We Stand explored the after-effects of Anole's numerous traumatic experiences at the Xavier Institute during his return to his hometown. Northstar, now rehabilitated, is contacted by Cyclops to find Anole, who goes into hiding after accidentally attacking his own father due to posttraumatic stress disorder from his experiences at the Xavier Institute. Northstar discovers Anole at his tree house, unhappy to see his former mentor. At first, Northstar makes jokes, thinking Anole is having a problem with fitting in as both a mutant and as a gay teen. Anole explains that his town accepts him for who he is and that his problems come from Northstar, along with the other X-Men, for providing the students under their care with a poor education, stealing their innocence by constantly exposing them to danger, and then throwing them away by disbanding. Planning to run away, Anole leaves a note for his parents at the tree house and elbows Northstar in the face—similar to how Northstar attacked him in the past—and tells him to tell all of the former New X-Men not to come looking for him.

=== Young X-Men ===
Dani Moonstar personally recruits Anole to the Young X-Men team by visiting him at his new home. Anole is still apprehensive, maintaining his views from Divided We Stand, but is persuaded to join the team when Dani tells him that the X-Men have relocated to San Francisco, California, "a place renowned for its tolerance of mutants and... other minorities," a reference to Anole's gay identity. Moving to San Francisco, he engages in various missions with the Young X-Men, including assisting during the Skrull invasion of San Francisco.

When his teammate Dust dies from a hidden medical condition brought on by her fight with Magma, Anole once again voices his opinions about leaving the team as they are constantly put in danger with mortal consequences. Dust is revived by teammate Ink and she convinces the team not to disband.

=== Nation X ===
During the Utopia storyline, the X-Men leave their San Francisco base and establish the island Utopia for mutants on the remains of Asteroid M. The anthology series Nation X explores the characters' reactions to this relocation, with Anole featuring in his own story, "Big Boy Pants". The story depicts Cannonball teaching the younger X-Men how to farm their own crops, but Anole argues that it is a waste of time since they could just buy their food from a store. He looks to Magik for agreement, but she responds by teleporting him to Limbo for five days without food or water. Eventually she returns to bring him water, and Anole tells her that he learned his lesson: without their own food supply, the mutant race could die. Magik informs him that this was not a lesson and that she merely sent him to Limbo because she was sick of looking at him. She returns them both to Utopia and Anole resumes farming, too afraid of Magik to tell anyone what happened. He is almost killed by the mutant Sack, who wanted his own corner of Utopia.

=== Second Coming ===
During the Second Coming crossover storyline, Anole appears prominently in the three issue tie-in series X-Men: Hellbound. In it, he joins a team of X-Men in rescuing Magik from Limbo after she is sent there by Bastion's forces. Cannonball chooses Anole for the mission to provide moral support for Pixie, whose teleportation ability they require to travel to Limbo. Anole and Pixie are extremely reluctant to risk themselves for Magik, who they believe does not deserve to be saved, but decide to go because they are heroes. In Limbo, Anole fends off demons and bickers with Cannonball; he also takes out his teammate Dazzler when she is corrupted by Limbo's influence. In the end, Pixie and Anole somewhat resolve their issues with Magik and the team return home.

=== Marvel NOW! ===
Anole returned to New York to attend the Jean Grey School of Higher Learning alongside many of his former classmates. At some point he began taking AP Economics, and soon became a member of the reborn Angel's Board of Directors for Worthington Industries. Anole later graduates to official X-Men status.

=== All-New, All-Different Marvel ===
Under the All-New, All Different Marvel branding, Anole is a supporting character in the pages of Extraordinary X-Men (2015–2017). He has been seen assisting the X-Men at X-Haven with helping refugee mutants. Anole along with Glob Herman, Martha Johansson, and Ernst are under the tutelage of Colossus in training to become more experienced X-Men. The four of them become lost in the future for a full year before the X-Men manage to bring them back to the 'current' time period.

=== Dawn of X ===
In "House of X and Powers of X", Anole becomes a resident of Krakoa after it is established as a mutant nation. He and Blob become the co-owners and bartenders of the tiki bar Green Lagoon.

Anole is trained by the New Mutants in how to use his powers in combination with the other young mutants of the Akadamos Habitat. He is shown to have bonded with other students Cosmar, Rain Boy, and No-Girl, who all feel shame due to their inhuman appearances and resent their teachers for refusing to kill them in the Crucible so they can be resurrected by the Five in more human bodies. After training, they secretly travel to the Wild Hunt, the home of the Shadow King, for further training.

Shadow King teaches the group how to switch bodies using No-Girl's powers, then takes them to the Boneyard, a Krakoan morgue. He has them inhabit the bodies there so they can experience being more human. Gabby Kinney becomes suspicious of all the time they are spending with the Shadow King and voices her concerns about him to them and the New Mutants. However, the New Mutants are unhelpful and Anole and his friends angrily rebuff her. They refuse to believe Shadow King has malicious intent until after the Hellfire Gala, when they learn that Gabby has been killed. After explaining the circumstances and accepting that the Shadow King was the most likely culprit, the Five decide to ignore the rule against clones being resurrected and help Gabby. By combining their powers, Anole and his group force Shadow King to leave his host body, Amahl Farouk.

== Powers and abilities ==
Anole's reptilian mutation gives him green scaly skin, a spiked head carapace instead of hair, a prehensile sticky tongue, the ability to stick to solid surfaces, and enhanced agility, speed, reflexes/reactions, coordination, and balance. He can also rapidly camouflage himself through physiological color change to his surroundings to become "invisible." Anole can grow back lost limbs and damaged body parts, making them stronger in the process. This ability was first demonstrated when he regenerated his lost right arm; the regenerated limb is larger than before and has spikes similar to those on his head.

== Sexuality and reception ==
Early in the character's publication history, Anole's sexual identity was alluded to by his close relationship with his squad mentor Northstar, one of Marvel's most recognized openly gay superheroes. After Northstar's "death," Anole's conversations with his former mentor Karma, an openly lesbian character, discussed how he felt it was important for him to have someone like Northstar, who "understood him," to talk to in particular. His sexual orientation was later confirmed by DeFilippis on an online forum, who stated that the dialogue intentionally alluded to this, and was reaffirmed in The X-Men: 198 Files. His sexual orientation continued to be mentioned indirectly, and other allusions included him pointing out that Young Avengers characters Wiccan and Hulkling are gay before being cut off, and Anole attacking Rockslide for calling him a "sissy," Rockslide shouting that he "didn't know" and that he "shouldn't be so sensitive." In the following issue, Anole's sexuality was officially stated outright for the first time when Rockslide announces, "Anole's gay!" in an attempt to quickly get the remaining students to bond with each other by opening up about their secrets. Despite Rockslide's vocal acceptance of his sexuality, Anole was outraged, though Loa stated that his classmates already knew.

Since then, Anole's sexual orientation has been handled more openly, being directly referred to as "gay." When discussing further story development of Anole's sexuality during their run on New X-Men, Yost and Kyle stated that they had no plans to further cover the issue, emphasizing that Anole would be able to work out any issues he had regarding his sexuality or his lack of reconciliation with his former mentor Northstar by covering them off-panel with teammate Rockslide. Anole would later confront a rehabilitated Northstar in the X-Men: Divided We Stand vignette "Blend In," revealing that contrary to Jean-Paul's assumptions, he experienced no difficulties being accepted as a mutant or gay from his family or residents of his hometown, and instead experienced posttraumatic stress disorder and a sense of being used and abandoned after his time with the X-Men.

During his review of X-Men: Divided We Stand, writer Dustin Christian of For the Love of Comics Reviews expressed pleasant surprise upon realizing Anole's sexuality and praised writers Yost and Kyle for their handling of the character during their creative run on New X-Men, stating, "It's cool to see a gay character depicted in a non-stereotypical fashion so that their orientation doesn't define everything they do and someone like me wouldn't even know that about them."

In the vignette "Abomination" featured in X-Men: Manifest Destiny, Anole and his Young X-Men teammate Graymalkin have a talk where Graymalkin discusses his past and reveals that he too is gay and was a victim of a near-fatal homophobic attack at the hands of his father. Anole reassures him that he will be all right and the two form a friendship. Lyle Masaki of AfterElton.com expressed interest in this development, stating that, "[w]ith the small number of gay superheroes out there, camaraderie between gay characters is as rare as same-sex couples."

== Alternate storylines ==
Anole coming out to his parents. Original artwork for the scrapped storyline in New Mutants vol. 2. Art by Carlo Barberi.

A scrapped story plot in New Mutants vol. 2 involved Anole committing suicide after coming out at Parent's Day and being shunned by his parents and two closest friends, Joshua Foley (Elixir) and Julian Keller (Hellion), for his sexual orientation. The storyline was originally written to take place in issues 8–10.

The storyline involved Anole's parents and others becoming outraged when some parents witness his instructor Karma kissing another woman. Anole reacts to his parents' outrage by defending her and outing himself. Rejected and disowned by his parents, he seeks solace in Josh and Julian, but also finds himself rejected by them. This causes him to commit suicide. The story resulted in Josh discovering Anole's body while attempting to apologize for his reaction, serving as impetus for him to reform his attitudes while Julian would maintain what would later be revealed to be a facade of indifference. Northstar, as Marvel's "highest profile homosexual," would be a key character in pointing out Karma's difficulties being accepted because of her sexuality by the students' parents, as well as the absurdity of a gay student killing himself over rejection in a school for outcasts. Weir and DeFilippis stated that in addition to being a message about intolerance, the story would serve as a key factor in redeeming Elixir from his initial introduction as an anti-mutant bigot while solidifying Julian's character as "cruel".

Though issue 8 was printed and issue 9 drawn, Marvel put a hold on releasing the issues due to the storyline's controversial nature. Both writers state that ideas to "soft-pedal" the issue were fetched to them, including eliminating Karma's lesbian kiss, having it off-panel, or Northstar never actually stating his sexual orientation. The writers compromised, depicting the same-sex kiss on-panel and silhouetted. Marvel eventually decided to scrap the issues, intending to release issue 10 as issue 8. The writers objected, noting that issue 10 featured the school still dealing with Anole's suicide and would leave Josh's change in character unexplained. Weir and DeFilippis convinced editors to allow them to write a new story last minute from the artwork of the old storyline and changed the dialogue while removing all references to the suicide and changing the reasons for Josh's reformation. Weir and DeFilippis later stated that they were happier with losing this plot, as they did not like the direction it would have taken Julian as a character, noting that, "[t]he Julian who developed since then is not a guy who'd have a problem with Victor being gay. In fact, he'd wipe the walls with anyone who did."

Pink Kryptonite staff writer Megan Parker ("Elf Girl") expressed displeasure with the original storyline and relief with the final changes, stating that, "[killing] off a gay character to further a straight character's development to a 'better human being,'" was understandable as an intended message about intolerance, but "just a bit overused."

== Other versions ==
Various alternate universe versions of Anole have appeared throughout the character's publication history.

- In House of M, Anole is a junior operative of S.H.I.E.L.D.
- In a dystopic future depicted in the final two issues of Young X-Men, Anole is one of the few mutants remaining at Xaviera, a mutant haven, before he is killed by Dust.
- Anole appears in the 2019 storyline Age of X-Man, which takes place in an alternate universe created by Nate Grey.

== In other media ==
- Anole makes a non-speaking appearance in the Marvel Anime: X-Men episode "Conflict - Contested".
- Anole makes a non-speaking appearance in the X-Men '97 episode "A Force to Be Reckoned With".

== See also ==
- LGBT themes in comics
- LGBT themes in American mainstream comics
