= Hellion (character) =

Marvel Comics character

- Hellion as depicted in New X-Men vol. 2 #43 (December 2007). Art by Skottie Young.

Publication information
- Publisher: Marvel Comics
- First appearance: New Mutants vol. 2 #2 (Aug. 2003)
- Created by: Nunzio DeFilippis; Christina Weir; Keron Grant

In-story information
- Alter ego: Julian Keller
- Species: Human mutant
- Team affiliations: Hellions (training squad); X-Men in training; New X-Men; Jean Grey School for Higher Learning
- Notable aliases: Krakoan
- Abilities: Telekinesis

Hellion (Julian Keller) is a fictional character, a mutant appearing in American comic books published by Marvel Comics. He was a member of the student body of the Xavier Institute before its closing and was a member of the X-Men's training squad.

Hellion joined the X-Men in Utopia and during the "Second Coming" storyline, loses his hands in a battle to protect the mutant messiah. He subsequently learned to use his telekinetic abilities to telekinetically control his prosthetic hands. He returned to Westchester and joined the Jean Grey Academy led by Wolverine. After the "Secret Wars" storyline, Hellion comes into contact with the Terrigen Mist and nearly dies of M-Pox. During the Krakoan Age, he relocates to Krakoa and participates in the Crucible, which results in his death. He then goes through the mutant resurrection protocols; this resurrection process restores his body, including his hands. During the "From the Ashes" publishing initiative, following the fall of Krakoa, Julian reappears in New York City as the villain known as the Krakoan.

== Publication history ==
In 2003, Hellion first appeared in New Mutants (vol. 2) #2 and was created by Nunzio DeFilippis, Christina Weir, and Keron Grant. Following the end of Grant Morrison's New X-Men, New Mutants was then relaunched as New X-Men: Academy X in May 2004. Hellion appeared in this series, and the limited series New X-Men: Hellions, as a member of the Hellions. Following the 2005 "Decimation" storyline where most mutants were depowered, the training squads were dismantled and Hellion joined the New X-Men team. The title was later shortened to simply New X-Men when the new creative team of Craig Kyle and Christopher Yost took over the series with issue #20. In 2008, the series ended with issue #46 during the "Messiah Complex" storyline; Hellion is gravely injured during this crossover event. In the follow-up storyline, Hellion is the focal point of one of the short stories in X-Men: Divided We Stand #1 which highlights his discovery that the X-Men are gone and the students have been scattered.

In 2009, Hellion appeared in X-Force (vol. 3) where he is saved by the X-Force team and cured of the Legacy Virus. He then appears in the 2009 "Utopia" storyline set in San Francisco. During the 2010 "X-Men: Second Coming" crossover event, Hellion fought on the front lines to defend Utopia resulting in the loss of his hands in the battle. Following this, he appeared in X-Men: Legacy. The "Fables of the Reconstruction" story arc, in issues #242–243, by writer Mike Carey focused on Hellion. On the confrontation between Hellion and Cyclops during this arc, Carey said:

I think that conversation between Hellion and Cyclops is painful on both sides – and the judgment is flowing in two directions. I think the key difference between the two men at that point is that Cyclops has sanctioned extreme violence having reached the conclusion that nothing else would do the job; Hellion has lashed out in a moment of complete loss of control. Both have blood on their hands, and each thinks that their own violence was defensible. You have to work out where you sit in relation to that argument.

Hellion also made guest appearances in the ongoing series X-23 by writer Marjorie Liu. Following the 2011 "X-Men: Schism" crossover event, Wolverine returned to Westchester to open the Jean Grey School for Higher Learning which was the focus of the Wolverine and the X-Men series. Hellion was one of a number of mutant students who enrolled in that school. In 2014, Hellion was then one of the students in the Special Class taught by Spider-Man, in the limited series Spider-Man and the X-Men by writer Elliott Kalan and artist Marco Failla, following Wolverine's death. On Hellion and the room for character growth, Kalan commented:

His actions are informed by his experiences as a potential mutant leader with a huge destiny ahead of him whose life unexpectedly fell apart, and his future derailed. Now he doesn't know where he's headed anymore and that makes him lash out. He's got a really good reason to be an angry brat! [...] By the end of this first storyline, Hellion will hopefully be ready once again to become the guy he was always meant to be.

In 2016, Hellion appears in Uncanny Avengers (vol. 3) #6 where he attempts to destroy New Attilan since he is dying of the M-Pox disease after being exposed to the Terrigen Mists. Instead, he is captured by the Inhumans and Medusa vows he will be saved. In 2017, later in the series, he is seen volunteering at the New Attilan General Hospital as repayment for being cured of M-Pox. In 2018, artist Carlos Pacheo mistakenly drew Hellion with normal hands instead of his metal hands in Phoenix Resurrection #2.

During the Krakoan Age, Hellion lived on Krakoa. In 2024, during the "X-Men: From the Ashes" publishing initiative, Hellion reappears in New York City as one of the main villains of the ongoing series NYX (vol. 2) where he is known as the Krakoan. The series is written by duo Collin Kelly and Jackson Lanzing with art by Francesco Mortarino. Kelly likened Hellion to "a certain pink-haired troublemaker", describing him as a privileged and powerful individual who assumed the world would conform to his expectations. However, over time, Hellion has "been HAMMERED with the hard fact that that presumption is completely and utterly wrong". On Hellion's role as the Krakoan, Lanzing explained:

He's always been a fascinating character, but what interested me was lensing our story in on a person who had a genuine grievance in the post-Krakoa era and was properly set up to take on a kind of street-level Magneto role. After all, isn't that the thing about Magneto – that you can genuinely empathize and agree with his point of view? Like Magnus/Erik/Max before him, the Krakoan has a point… but it's coming from a place of deep scarring on his soul.

Lanzing described Kelly as a "lifelong fan of Hellion" who wanted to give the character "a story that really paid tribute to his hard-knock time as a young mutant". Hellion is the point of view character for issue #8 (February 2025); this issue also included flashbacks to his time on Krakoa.

== Fictional character biography ==
=== Xavier Institute ===
Born in Los Angeles, California, to parents who managed to work their way out of poverty to become billionaires, Julian was sent to the Xavier Institute in hopes that he would learn to use his powers with some discretion. Hellion has quickly adopted an attitude of superiority while training at the Xavier Institute that has annoyed some of his classmates. A fast favorite of headmistress Emma Frost, who sees in him great potential for heroism as well as a frightening disposition for personal gain and villainy, Julian named himself 'Hellion' in tribute to the former White Queen's first class of students (who had been killed by Trevor Fitzroy).

Hellion has demonstrated quite a significant interest in Sofia Mantega, co-leader of the rival New Mutants squad. The two different personalities had a flirtatious relationship from the beginning, but also often clashed when it came to ideals and beliefs. The two had quite an effect on each other. While Sofia became more rebellious, even helping the Hellions attempt to break Wither out of jail, Julian became more sensitive and more comfortable with his emotions. However, when Sofia rejected Julian's invitation to the school dance, Julian dated all three of the Stepford Cuckoos. By the end of the night, the pair eventually reunited on the dance floor.

Despite his relationship with Sofia, he is particularly hard on her New Mutant teammates like David Alleyne, the New Mutants' other leader, whom he views as possessing a particularly useless mutant power and as a genuine competitor as a leader and strategist. However, when the Blob attacked the school, Julian followed David's plan of attack. He had an on-and-off friendship with Elixir, initially befriending him until he learned of his past as a member of the Reavers. However, they have since reconciled and have a more friendly and supportive relationship. Despite his tumultuous relationship with the New Mutants, he was the one who encouraged Sofia to put her squad back together when they were on the brink of disbanding.

=== M-Day aftermath ===
In the aftermath of M-Day, the previous squad system has been abandoned due to the diminished number of powered students. Those left have been placed to join the only squad that would train under the X-Men, called the New X-Men team. Just prior to the competition, Emma asked Julian to make sure that X-23 was eliminated early. However, when given the chance to knock her out, he saved her instead, because he owed her for doing the same during a session in the "Danger Cave". As a result, Emma placed Surge as team leader to punish Hellion. Surge and Hellion had a well documented mutual dislike for each other, which only intensifies after M-Day.

Julian, having trouble with his powers, is practicing with Beast in the Danger Room when he accidentally blows a hole in the floor. After taking a shower, he goes looking for Mercury when he comes across Loa, Rockslide, and Anole watching the Young Avengers on TV. He eventually finds a bloodied X-23 and finds out Mercury has been kidnapped by the Facility and tags along. X-23 uses her underworld contacts to find Mercury's captors and Julian is horrified when Laura kills people working for the people who created her and he tells her not to. They head to the Facility and are confronted by Kimura and a squad of guards. After a brief fight, Julian throws Kimura a few miles away and together they find Mercury; when they are confronted by a group of Predator Xs, one injures his shoulder.

Alongside Nori, Hellion is one of the students who was not transported to Limbo. While he and Surge argue about his reckless disregard for her leadership by leaving with X-23 to save Mercury and not telling her, the other students inside the X-Mansion get transported to Limbo while they are still outside. Trance used her powers to get a message to the two. She told them that they were taken to hell and then she said "Belasco" and disappeared. Surge and Hellion went to the Office of National Emergency and learned that Amanda Sefton was in a coma in Germany. The two demanded that they be the ones to go see her. Later, Hellion, Surge, and a Sentinel are transported to Limbo, where they are attacked by demons. After Illyana comes to her senses, she teleports everyone back to the X-Mansion.

During the "World War Hulk" storyline, Hellion is one of the students who confront the Hulk when he shows up at the institute. He uses his powers to pin down the Hulk in the first attack but Hulk knocks him away. When Hellion goes in for a second attack he is the first to be defeated. Hulk realizes he is a telekinetic so he gets him out of the way. Hulk smashes his hands together, creating a boom which knocks out Hellion, rupturing his eardrums.

While practicing his powers, Julian complains to Mercury about his powers and says he cannot deal with anything smaller than a refrigerator, and because Marvel Girl is still in space, he is one of the last telekinetics on the planet. Afterwards, he and Mercury are with the Stepford Cuckoos trying to locate the youngest mutant on the planet when Emma Frost asks to see them both for an interview. He reminds Emma about her bizarre trust speech and how she has blown them off since the Purifier attack. He says that she is just putting a little distance between them in case they do not make it.

Later, the students all gather to find out who the youngest student is. During the meeting, Nori kisses Julian in front of Prodigy. Julian pushes her off and notices an upset X-23 leave. He flies off outside and Dust catches up to him. He tells her his best friend is dead, the girl he thought he loves is gone, his mentor flipped out, he cannot stop thinking about a girl who literally scares him, and now he has to deal with Nori. He says it is too hard and while he used to be so sure he has no idea now and there is no one to show him. He then thanks Sooraya for being there. He then walks in on Nori and David in the middle of a fight. He throws David against the ceiling and when he asks Nori if she is OK, David hits him from behind and injures him. He then tells David that he 'didn't kiss her'. to which David replies, 'I know'. He is then told he should go see Elixir about his injuries.

=== Messiah Complex and aftermath ===
While recovering from her injuries, Blindfold predicts that Hellion will be injured. Some of the New X-Men decide to launch a pre-emptive strike against the Purifiers. After spying on the Purifiers, they are ambushed by the Reavers and Lady Deathstrike, who critically wounds Hellion. Pixie then manages to teleport the team out and are spread between Washington and the institute. He was later seen aboard the X-Jet with Iceman and the New X-Men during the Sentinel attack on the mansion being treated by Mercury. After getting him to what is left of the infirmary, Beast and Prodigy manage to stabilize him.

Later, when Predator X attacks the mansion, Hellion is saved by the New X-Men, and Pixie teleports the other New X-Men to Muir Island.

Julian wakes up in a hotel room, still hooked up to medical equipment, after experiencing flashbacks of his injury. He finds Emma Frost watching over him, who soon informs Julian that the X-Men are no more and that the school is gone. Julian immediately panics, claiming Cessily and Sooraya would never have left him, and asks where Laura is, but Emma tells him that everyone is being taken care of. Julian tells Emma that she is taking away everything from him again and Emma puts him to sleep. When Julian awakens again, Emma is gone and he tries to go back home, only to find his parents have put their house up for sale and moved without telling him. Julian begins to search for Magneto, soon finding him and claiming that Magneto needs him. Magneto refuses, telling him that he knows Julian is extremely hurt by the people he loved, so much so that he wants to hurt them back by joining their "greatest enemy". Magneto leaves Julian, telling him to enjoy his time off because a new war for mutant-kind will come soon enough.

Julian is later kidnapped along with Boom Boom and Surge by the Leper Queen and her Sapien League. The Leper Queen injects him with a modified version of the Legacy Virus. After X-Force comes to save the mutants, they find out Surge and Hellion have been sent to the United Nations building. Before Wolverine can kill the Leper Queen and save Julian, Nori, and Boom-Boom, X-Force is teleported out by Cyclops. However, after completing their mission X-Force travel back in time and head to the United Nations Building to save Julian and Nori, while X-23 saves Boom Boom. Elixir cures Julian and Nori of the Legacy Virus, saving them.

=== Utopia and Second Coming ===
When anti-mutant protesters led by Simon Trask march in San Francisco in support of Proposition X, Julian and a number of other mutants attempt to stall their demonstration. When Hellion taunts the protesters, Trask incites a riot. During the chaos, Julian physically assaults Trask on national television. The event calls Norman Osborn and his Dark Avengers to the city to restore order. In the process, Osborn forms his own team of X-Men led by Hellion's former mentor, Emma Frost, and institutes a curfew on the city. Believing this to be a last stand for mutant rights, Hellion gathers a group at a bar owned by the former X-Villain Avalanche with the intent to break curfew and get arrested on TV in non-violent protest. The group fails to make its intended point as Match torches the surrounding area with his powers, and Hellion is arrested by Emma and her Dark X-Men. They are taken into custody after a battle.

Later he is, along with all the other prisoners, saved when Emma and Namor betray Osborn and resides with the rest of the X-Men on Utopia. During the "Necrosha" storyline, Hellion is seen with Surge and Prodigy, fighting the resurrected Rusty Collins.

During the "Second Coming" storyline, Hellion participates in a battle to protect the mutant messiah, Hope, and the remaining mutants on Utopia against Bastion's Sentinels. During the fight he is overpowered and is injured, losing both of his hands and most of his right forearm. He is placed on life support prior to being shipped to Namor's underwater Atlantean colony for reasons of safety and protection. He is eventually stabilized, but cannot participate in the remaining battle. After the Nimrod fleet is destroyed and Hope defeats Bastion, Hellion confronts her, bitter about his injuries, but is rebuffed by Magneto.

Hellion using his strong telekinetic abilities to telekinetically control his artificial hands.

Following the events of "Second Coming", Hellion is with Kavita Rao, testing metal hands created by Madison Jeffries; however, his telekinetic energy apparently interferes with the operation of cyborg hands or even conventional prosthetic hands, since none can be adapted to his use. After destroying her lab, Rogue comes to collect him to help out rebuild in San Francisco. During the reconstruction of a building, Hellion is resentful of Hope Summers, blaming her for his injuries. While taking out his anger on some old walls he starts becoming reckless and almost hits Hope and a young girl helping her. Hope goes to confront Julian when Karima Shapandar flies towards the trio and begins attacking them. During the ensuing battle, Hellion's powers manifest uniquely as he is able to feel the telekinetic wave and the objects it touches down to their sub-atomic structures, moving it through the empty space within atoms to hit a target behind them. After momentarily disposing of Hellion when he is distracted by the other X-Men, who think he initiated the attack, Shapandar defeats the team and begins procedures to kill them off, but Hellion engages her a second time in a short and brutal assault fueled by his repressed rage, crushing her in battle. Her human side briefly reasserts itself during the fight, asking Hellion to put her out of her misery and stop her from harming others. He does so, delivering a telekinetic onslaught that leaves her in a coma and possibly brain dead. During a conversation with Cyclops, Hellion shows no remorse for his actions and is informed he is on probation. If he cannot control himself, he will either have to leave Utopia or be locked up in the Brig.

==== X-23 series ====
In the X-23 series, Hellion and X-23 address their previous closeness more openly since the events of New X-Men, while he defends her from the scorn of her former New X-Men teammates, who are wary of her due to her involvement with X-Force. After a fire breaks out at a half-way house X-23 was sent to, Hellion goes to visit her in the infirmary on Utopia. When he enters her room, he walks in on what appears to be X-23 stabbing Wolverine. In reality however, Logan's soul has been sent to hell and his body is possessed by a demon. The demon started the fire in the half-way house, murdered its occupants, and has been invading X-23's dreams. While X-23 tries to explain, the demon-possessed Wolverine stabs Hellion in the back. To save his life, X-23 bargains with the demon.

=== M-Pox ===
Hellion left Utopia following Wolverine to Westchester to the Jean Grey Academy, which was now headed by Wolverine.

Eight months after the events of the "Secret Wars" storyline, Hellion is shown to be dying of the M-Pox disease after accidentally coming in contact with Terrigen Mist. He attacks Attilan in retaliation, but is defeated by Synapse. Hellion is taken into custody by the Inhumans, with Medusa promising that he will be given medical attention. Hellion is treated and cured of his M-Pox symptoms at the New Attilan General Hospital. As an act of gratitude, he decides to pay the hospital back with volunteer work.

=== Krakoan Age and aftermath ===
Hellion later became a citizen of Krakoa when it was established as a mutant nation. He was able to reunite with his fellow Hellions members. He went through the Crucible resulting in his death and subsequent resurrection through the mutant resurrection protocols; this process restored his hands.

After Krakoa relocates to the White Hot Room following Orchis' defeat, Hellion becomes the villain known as the Krakoan in New York City.

== Powers and abilities ==
Hellion is an unusually strong telekinetic. He is able to fly at supersonic speeds, create telekinetic force fields, unleash powerful blasts of telekinetic force, and levitate and manipulate objects from afar. His telekinetic aura is colored light green and glows around his hands, body, and the objects he telekinetically moves and controls.

When Emma unlocked subconscious blocks on his mutant ability, Hellion was able to reach a flight speed several times the speed of sound, faster than one of the O*N*E Sentinel pilots believed possible and destroyed a Sentinel by telekinetically hurling an armored wagon through it, but was severely injured from the physical strain afterward. With this lack of focus, Hellion has difficulty using his telekinetic abilities with fine control such as lifting up a paper clip but has no problem in raw power when it comes to destroying the entire floor that the paper clip resides on. During his battle with Bastion, he said he felt his telekinesis get stronger and he can now control matter at a molecular level. This was proven when he sent a telekinetic blast through Hope and into Omega Sentinel without harming Hope, but completely destroying Omega Sentinel.

In contrast to most other possessors of extremely strong and powerful telekinesis, Hellion tends to focus and channel his telekinetic energy almost exclusively through his hands, very rarely projecting it as a free flow output directly from his brain. After losing his hands, Hellion's control over his telekinesis was greatly strengthened and magnified, he used his exceptionally powerful telekinesis to feed himself and his telekinetic aura now emanates from his brain. After the Age of X, Dr. Kavita Rao observes that Julian has actually benefited from the experience. She notes that the perception of living a lifetime in that world has allowed Hellion to refine his much stronger telekinetic abilities to fully control and manipulate the artificial hands created for him, a feat that normally could not be accomplished in Julian's condition before the Age of X reality.

== Relationships ==
=== X-23/Laura Kinney ===
At first, Hellion was hostile towards Laura Kinney (X-23), but during the Mercury Rising arc the two grew closer. Mercury managed to pick up on Laura's feelings towards him though he did not get Laura to admit to it. Over time Hellion began to feel the same way, though their relationship never managed to get much further. When Julian lost his hands during Second Coming, Laura stayed by him, watching him recover. After the Misadventures in Babysitting arc, Laura ended things between her and Hellion saying that she no longer felt the same way towards him.

Mike Fugere included Hellion and Laura on the 2018 CBR list "X-Men: 10 Couples That Are Relationship Goals", noting that they had "a classic love story for a new generation" and that "fans have often cited echoes of the relationship between Jean Grey and Wolverine (the Logan one) when it comes to these two". Ashley Fields, for Screen Rant in 2025, noted that NYX (vol. 2) #8 reminds "fans of Hellion's incredible impact on Wolverine's life" and that the issue "offers a solid look back at her and Hellion's past, but a couple of pages isn't quite enough to capture everything they meant to one another". Fields highlighted that when Laura joined "the Academy X class of students, she wasn't exactly met with a wealth of support. She was met with fear and suspicion, and Hellion stepped up as one of the first people to see beyond that". Fields commented that while their history "is hardly all roses", this issue puts the two characters on "a clear path toward building a new friendship". Stephanie Burt, in a review of the issue for ComicsXF, highlighted the personal growth of both characters – "Laura gradually becoming a person and not just a weapon, Julian learning how his anger shapes him but need not control him, both of them figuring out how whatever kissy-face tension once brought them together belongs in the past, but the loyalty they developed for each other … maybe that holds right now".

== Other versions ==
=== Age of X ===
In "Age of X", Hellion is a member of the Force Warriors, a select group of telekinetics who protect Fortress X. Prior to arriving at Fortress X, Hellion was on the run before being attacked by soldiers, who severed his hands and forearms. To replace his lost hands, Hellion utilizes a pair of metal hands that he manipulates with his telekinesis.

=== House of M ===
In "House of M", Hellion is a junior S.H.I.E.L.D. operative, part of Danielle Moonstar's Hellions squad, and is known as Scion.

=== Old Woman Laura ===
In a possible future, Julian and Laura, who had become the new Wolverine, reestablished their relationship. However, after several years together, he is killed during a superhuman conflict known as the Doom World War.

== Reception ==
Rich Shivener, in his 2014 essay "No Mutant Left Behind: Lessons from New X-Men Academy X", discussed how the series reflects the types of bullying defined by the United States Department of Health and Human Services (HHS) and its 2004 "Stop Bullying Now!" campaign. He specifically examines the "Choosing Sides" arc, noting that bullying occurs "in more than one instance", with Hellion serving as the "central bully". Shivener describes Hellion as someone who "on numerous occasions threatens the New Mutants," whom he sees as a threat to his "self-assumed leadership at the Xavier Institute". However, Hellion also occasionally defends other students, which Shivener believes demonstrates the HHS idea that students "can 'be more than a bystander'". Despite these moments, Hellion ultimately returns to his bullying behavior, "raising questions about his own title as being homo superior". Zachary Jenkins of ComicsXF described this era's Hellion as a capable leader with "a soft spot for his teammates" but still "a big ol' jerk" who believed "his money and his powers allowed him to do whatever he wanted". Jenkins admitted he does not find Hellion "sympathetic" and considers him his "least favorite of the New X-Men kids".

Jenkins noted that during the "Utopia" storyline, Hellion "led riots throughout" San Francisco against mutant mistreatment, directly contributing to the creation of Utopia. In the "Second Coming" storyline, though he survived with advanced prosthetics, Hellion became "very bitter about" losing his hands while defending the island. Jenkins criticized this portrayal, arguing that "a disabled character whose mutant abilities" make them functionally unchanged "loses a bit of its impact"; subsequently, Julian began to isolate himself, even from Laura. While many consider Craig Kyle and Christopher Yost's New X-Men the essential Hellion story, Jenkins disagreed, feeling Julian "never really redeems himself" in that run. Instead, he praised Mike Carey, who "immediately got the character" in just "two issues of X-Men: Legacy".

In a 2016 discussion on rating X-Men characters at ComicsAlliance, Hellion received a total of 29 out of 50 with four of the five writers rating him at 6 out of 10. Steve Morris called Hellion a "superior version of Quentin Quire" while Katie Schenkel preferred to have Quire over Hellion; Andrew Wheeler viewed Hellion not as superior to Quire "but as the derivative Manuel de la Rocha" who is "more sympathetic" and has "potential". Morris commented that "Hellion got developed through a long-term traumatic origin to turn him into the antiseptic half-hero of the X-Men's newest generation, until editorial gave up on that generation and switched to a mix of Morrison/Quitely's kids and some new bland ones that don't work". Elle Collins disagreed with Morris that Hellion was completely "dropped from memory" given his recent role in the Spider-Man and the X-Men series, noting that "his free-floating robo-hands are a great visual". Hellion appeared on the 2020 CBR list "X-Men: The 10 Most Powerful Members Of The Hellions, Ranked" at #2; Grant Stoye highlighted that the character "is one of the strongest telekinetics on Earth" and "the scariest thing about Hellion is how strong his powers have gotten over the years, and what his true potential may be".

Ashley Fields, for Screen Rant in 2024, expressed disappointment that Julian appeared as the villain Krakoan in NYX (vol. 2) #1. She highlighted his turbulent history where he was left "lost and furious" following "M-Day, a Purifier attack that killed his best friend, and" the loss of "his hands in a violent assault on Utopia". Fields noted that "Hellion's anger was met with disgust and punishment", unlike other young mutants who received mentorship such as Quentin Quire, and he was "relegated to a literal background presence", left to cope with his trauma alone. She described the character as "deeply affected" by Krakoa's fall and the renewed persecution of mutants, but criticized how this version of Julian "leans more into bitter villainy rather than his leadership potential and natural revolutionary tendencies". Alex Schlesinger, for Screen Rant in 2025, praised NYX (vol. 2) #8 as "a wonderful character study" of Hellion, depicting his plea "for death in Krakoa's Crucible, his romantic relationship with Laura", and the reveal that he "never killed the politicians" and is "not capable of being a true villain". Like Fields, Schlesinger highlighted the "missed opportunity" in the Krakoan Age due to Hellion's underutilization but found the issue's Krakoa flashbacks compelling, particularly the "fascinating glimpse at the disability politics of Krakoan Resurrection," an aspect he felt was underexplored. The story also showed why Hellion was so devastated by Krakoa's fall – "the island nation was the first time in years he felt safe and himself, and humanity took it away from him without a second's thought". Jonathan Jones for AIPT similarly praised NYX (vol. 2) #8 as "a stellar character piece on the hell-raising Hellion", exploring "communication, the violence we can do to our loved ones with words, and how anger can be a mask over a cry for help. Hellion claims that he is a nail that refuses to break under the might of the world's hammer, but maybe he's learning that being broken doesn't mean losing yourself or what makes you a hero". Jones noted that while Julian as the Krakoan initially appears as an "impression of Silver-Age Magneto", Laura breaks through his facade, revealing that he is "not a blossoming megalomaniac, but a hero who's burned out–someone who can still make good out of his mistakes". Schlesinger noted that he "can finally see the appeal of Hellion as an X-Men hero", praising writers Collin Kelly and Jackson Lanzing for "humanizing Julian" and artist Francesco Mortarino for "perfectly" capturing Julian's "complex and triggered emotions". Jones opined that in addition to "rich character work", Mortarino and colorist Raúl Angulo "infused" the dialogue-heavy issue with "beautiful imagery" and specifically highlighted the flashbacks which appeared in both Julian's "mindscape and as ghostly figures that haunt Laura", enhancing the story's emotional depth.

== In other media ==
- Hellion appears in Wolverine and the X-Men, voiced by Roger Craig Smith. This version is a member of Professor X's future X-Men.
- Hellion and his relationship with X-23 is referenced in the MC Chris song "Nrrrd Grrrl".
