= X-Men: Divided We Stand =

Marvel Comics storyline

- Cover of X-Men: Divided We Stand 1 (Jun 2008), art by Brandon Peterson
- Publisher: Marvel Comics
- Publication date: February – August 2008
- Genre: Superhero; Crossover
Title(s)
X-Men: Divided We Stand #1-2
Main series listed by individual story arc titles:
"Angels and Demons"
X-Force vol. 3, #1-6
"Divided"
The Uncanny X-Men #495-499
"Final Genesis"
Young X-Men #1-5
"From Genesis to Revelations"
X-Men: Legacy #208-214
"Get Mystique!"
Wolverine vol. 3, #62-65
"The Only Game in Town"
X-Factor vol. 3, #28-32
"Sins of the Father"
X-Men: Legacy #208-214
"War Baby"
Cable vol. 2, #1-5
- Uncanny X-Men: Divided We Stand: ISBN 0785119833
- X-Factor: The Only Game In Town: ISBN 0785128638
- X-Force: Angels and Demons: ISBN 0785129766
- X-Men: Divided We Stand: ISBN 0785132651
- X-Men Legacy: Divided He Stands: ISBN 0785130004
- X-Men Legacy: Sins of the Father: ISBN 0785130020
- Young X-Men: Final Genesis: ISBN 078513154X

"X-Men: Divided We Stand" is a 2008 comic book storyline published by Marvel Comics. One of the stories, "The Uncanny X-Men" by writer Matt Fraction, is a follow-up storyline to the "Messiah Complex" story arc.

== Publication history ==
The story started with the issues of the X-Men-related titles cover dated April 2008. This included: The Uncanny X-Men; Wolverine vol. 3; X-Factor vol. 3; and X-Men vol. 2, which was retitled X-Men: Legacy. It also launched three ongoing titles - Cable vol. 2, X-Force vol. 3, and Young X-Men - and a self-titled, two-issue limited series. Each ongoing series ran a separate story arc with "Divided We Stand" providing an overall theme. The aftermath of the story is continued in "X-Men: Manifest Destiny".

== Individual titles ==
- Uncanny X-Men
- X-Factor
- Young X-Men
- X-Men: Legacy
- X-Force
- Cable
- Wolverine
- Free Comic Book Day

== Plot ==
The X-Men are disbanded. A new X-Force team is formed to carry out covert assassination missions. Striking out on his own as usual, Wolverine hunts down Mystique to make her pay for her actions in Messiah Complex, while Cable tries to protect the mutant baby from Lucas Bishop.

== Reading order ==
=== Uncanny X-Men ===
- Uncanny X-Men #495
- Uncanny X-Men #496
- Uncanny X-Men #497
- Uncanny X-Men #498
- Uncanny X-Men #499

=== X-Men: Legacy ===
- X-Men: Legacy #208
- X-Men: Legacy #209
- X-Men: Legacy #210
- X-Men: Legacy #211
- X-Men: Legacy #212
- X-Men: Legacy #213
- X-Men: Legacy #214

=== X-Factor ===
- X-Factor Vol. 3 #28
- X-Factor Vol. 3 #29
- X-Factor Vol. 3 #30
- X-Factor Vol. 3 #31
- X-Factor Vol. 3 #32

=== X-Force ===
- X-Force Vol. 3 #1 (2008)
- X-Force Vol. 3 #2
- X-Force Vol. 3 #3
- X-Force Vol. 3 #4
- X-Force Vol. 3 #5
- X-Force Vol. 3 #6

=== Wolverine ===
- Wolverine Vol. 3 #62
- Wolverine Vol. 3 #63
- Wolverine Vol. 3 #64
- Wolverine Vol. 3 #65

=== Cable ===
- Cable Vol. 2 #1 (2008)
- Cable Vol. 2 #2
- Cable Vol. 2 #3
- Cable Vol. 2 #4
- Cable Vol. 2 #5
- King-Size Cable Spectacular #1 (2008)

=== Central title ===
- X-Men: Divided We Stand #1 (2008)
- X-Men: Divided We Stand #2

=== Young X-Men ===
- Young X-Men #1 (2008)
- Young X-Men #2
- Young X-Men #3
- Young X-Men #4
- Young X-Men #5
