= Kingmaker (comics) =

The Kingmaker is the name of three supervillains appearing in American comic books published by Marvel Comics.

== Publication history ==
The first iteration debuted in New X-Men: Hellions #1 (July 2005), and was created by Nunzio DeFilippis, Christina Weir and Clayton Henry.

The second iteration debuted in Dark Reign: Hawkeye #5 (September 2009), and was created by Andy Diggle and Tom Raney.

The third iteration debuted in Osborn #1 (January 2011), and was created by Kelly Sue DeConnick and Emma Rios.

== Fictional character biography ==
=== Wallace ===
Kingmaker

Publication information
- Publisher: Marvel Comics
- First appearance: New X-Men: Hellions #1 (July, 2005)
- Created by: Nunzio DeFilippis; Christina Weir (writers), Clayton Henry (pencils)

In-story information
- Alter ego: Wallace
- Species: Human (Presumed)
- Team affiliations: Hellfire Club
- Abilities: Unknown; has access to high-tech personal equipment and a network of powerful associates.

Wallace is a loan shark whose personal fortune and resources have allied him with various figures of the supervillain underworld. His standard agreement involves delivering any wish to an applicant in exchange for a favour to be named later. His network of favours has given him vast financial reserves, business agreements with powerful individuals, and a personal trove of high-tech weaponry for his personal defence. He has a history with Emma Frost as a result of her rejection of his bid for membership in the Hellfire Club.

When New X-Men member Hellion is denied a family inheritance, he investigates their financial history, eventually discovering their involvement with the Kingmaker. Hellion and his teammates are contacted by the Kingmaker, who offers their standard contract. In exchange for their deepest wishes, the Hellions are tasked with stealing a device for their benefactor. Unbeknownst to the Hellions, the device is a biological weapon that the Kingmaker intended to give to Doctor Octopus. The Hellions retrieve the device and turn on Kingmaker. After several losing battles, the Hellions defeat Kingmaker, who is arrested. Kingmaker is later released by Emma Frost, who convinces him to leave her students alone under the threat of being sent back to jail.

=== Bullseye's Father ===
Kingmaker

Publication information
- Publisher: Marvel Comics
- First appearance: Dark Reign: Hawkeye #4 (September, 2009)
- Created by: Andy Diggle; Tom Raney

In-story information
- Species: Human

The second version is the father of Bullseye and appeared during the Dark Reign storyline. While Bullseye is fighting an army of Hawkeyes, he is captured by Solo and brought before Kingmaker. The Kingmaker prepares to trade his old burned husk of a body for Bullseye's by placing his brain in his son's body. However, Bullseye's bones are laced with adamantium, which is impossible to cut through and blocks Kingmaker's neural inhibitor. Bullseye fights his way through Solo to get to his father, who he kills.

=== Pryor Cashman ===
Kingmaker

Publication information
- Publisher: Marvel Comics
- First appearance: Osborn #1 (January, 2011)
- Created by: Kelly Sue DeConnick; Emma Rios

In-story information
- Alter ego: Pryor Cashman
- Species: Human
- Abilities: Memory manipulation

The third version is Pryor Cashman, a "demon entity" who feeds on memories and is able to view and manipulate them. At some point, he is captured by government officials and incarcerated in an underwater facility. When Norman Osborn is jailed in the facility after being transferred from the Raft, he orchestrates a breakout alongside Kingmaker, June Covington, Ai Apaec, and Carny Rives.

== Powers and abilities ==
Wallace possesses a personal force field and sunglasses with ruby optic blasts similar to Cyclops's optic blasts.

Pryor Cashman can manipulate memories.
