= Graymalkin =

Marvel Comics superhero

- Graymalkin as depicted on the cover of Young X-Men #1 (June 2008). Art by Terry Dodson.

Publication information
- Publisher: Marvel Comics
- First appearance: Young X-Men #1 (June 2008)
- Created by: Marc Guggenheim; Yanick Paquette

In-story information
- Alter ego: Jonas Graymalkin
- Species: Human mutant
- Team affiliations: X-Men-In-Training; Young X-Men; Jean Grey School Students
- Abilities: (When in darkness): Longevity; Night vision; Superhuman strength; Invulnerability

Graymalkin (Jonas Graymalkin) is a fictional character appearing in American comic books published by Marvel Comics. He is a member of the Young X-Men and is named after the address of the Xavier Institute. His super-human strength varies on how much light he is exposed to and was discovered after his father buried him alive for finding him sexually experimenting with another boy.

== Publication history ==
Graymalkin was created by Marc Guggenheim and Yanick Paquette. He first appeared in Marvel Comics' 2008 series Young X-Men #1 during a prophetic vision by X-Men character Blindfold. His first full appearance was in Young X-Men #3. His previously unknown background was explored in X-Men: Manifest Destiny #3. While featured primarily in the ongoing Young X-Men series, Graymalkin has appeared as a supporting character in various other Marvel X-Men titles, including Secret Invasion: X-Men, Wolverine and Power Pack, Generation X, and Marvel's Voices: Pride.

== Fictional character biography ==
=== Origin ===
Jonas Graymalkin was the only child born to Charles and Marcia Graymalkin over two centuries ago. His family lived on the land where the Xavier Institute would eventually be built in New York. Jonas was 16 years old when his father caught him in the barn with another boy, experimenting with each other sexually; calling him an abomination, his father beat Jonas unconscious and buried him alive. Completely cut off from light, his mutant powers activated, and he fell into a state of suspended animation for 200 years.

=== Divided We Stand ===
After the events of Messiah Complex, Jonas awakens from his hibernation after what he describes as "some manner of apocalypse decimated the area, upsetting the very structure of the earth". He is found by Cipher and takes to observing the Young X-Men from the shadows, watching them leave to confront Sunspot's Brotherhood of Mutants. After Blindfold is captured, Graymalkin decides he must rescue her, kill "the Cyclops" and makes unexplained references to Cipher while rambling to himself. He later confronts Cyclops, who is revealed to be a disguised Donald Pierce.

=== Young X-Men ===
After the team deals with Pierce, Beast announced that an analysis of Graymalkin's DNA revealed he is not only a mutant, but related to Charles Xavier. Graymalkin later talks with Anole, another young gay mutant, about his past, with Anole assuring him that he will be safe with the X-Men.

== Powers and abilities ==
Graymalkin has a number of abilities that vary with exposure to light. His powers appear to strengthen with a lack of light, and he is weaker with exposure to light, though he is not powerless. Beast discovered Jonas' powers activated when he was buried alive and he went into suspended animation for over 200 years. His primary ability is super-human strength. He possesses night vision allowing him to see clearly in total darkness. Beast lists invulnerability and longevity as additional abilities, which allow him to survive the pressure and cold extremes of being buried alive.

== Reception ==
Lyle Masaki of AfterElton.com expressed interest in the vignette wherein Graymalkin and fellow gay teammate Anole discuss Graymalkin's sexual identity and the consequences of being discovered by his father. Masaki praised the seemingly platonic interaction between the two stating that, "[w]ith the small number of gay superheroes out there, camaraderie between gay characters is as rare as same-sex couples".
