= Cipher (comics) =

Marvel Comics superhero

- Cipher in her first appearance by Rapha Sandoval. Young X-Men #8.

Publication information
- Publisher: Marvel Comics
- First appearance: Young X-Men #8 (November 2008)
- Created by: Marc Guggenheim; Rafa Sandoval

In-story information
- Alter ego: Alisa Tager
- Species: Human mutant
- Team affiliations: X-Men-In-Training; Young X-Men; Jean Grey School Students; X-Corps
- Abilities: Complete stealth Invisibility; Phasing/intangibility; Inaudibility; In-odouribility

Cipher (Alisa Tager) is a mutant superhero appearing in American comic books published by Marvel Comics. She is a young African-American woman who first appeared in Young X-Men #8 (Nov. 2008) and was created by Marc Guggenheim and Rafa Sandoval.

== Publication history ==
Cipher's first appearance was in Young X-Men #8 by writer Marc Guggenheim and artist Rafa Sandoval. However, references to her character began in Young X-Men #3 and were initially written to deceptively reference Cypher, a long-deceased member of the New Mutants. Through retcons, Cipher is depicted as having been present during events prior to her character's creation, including Grant Morrison's 2001 run on New X-Men and Joss Whedon's 2004 tenure on Astonishing X-Men. She became a featured character in the series Young X-Men, and after that series ended, she appeared in Uncanny X-Men and Wolverine and the X-Men as part of the student cast.

== Fictional character biography ==
Cipher is introduced in the series Young X-Men, where she warns Ink that his teammates are in trouble and he is needed to come with her to save them. Although Ink is skeptical about Cipher's motivations and intentions, she is shown wearing the standard uniform of the Young X-Men, and has a jet from the X-Men's headquarters to transport him to his team as well, to show that her information is legitimate, even though she refuses to give any more information. However, she also gives into his demand to take him to his tattooist to give him new abilities, even though she voices that she feels he is wasting his time while his friends are in danger. She is still able to get him to the battle with the Y-Men in time, though, where Ink is able to turn the tide and save his teammates. Cipher revealing herself to save the Young X-Men causes several members of the team and X-Men faculty to question who she is and why they had never been aware of her.

Cyclops reveals that Cipher was first discovered during events depicted in New X-Men vol. 2. During a riot in Mutant Town, Jean Grey was able to detect Cipher's presence. Jean and Cyclops chose to keep Cipher's presence a secret at her request, aided by her mutant ability to become completely undetectable either psychically or physically. In the meantime, Cipher developed a friendship with Blindfold, secretly communicating with her and making Blindfold appear to be talking to herself. Cipher is also present for various other events in Young X-Men, secretly assisting the team. Her newly revealed presence generates feelings of uneasiness and anger over their seeming lack of privacy and Cipher's ability to go about undetected in their lives.

In a conversation with Cipher, Cyclops theorizes that she had chosen to reveal herself out of a subconscious desire to make herself known to those around her. Regardless, Cipher remains uneasy of her "outing" as she fears an individual only referred to as "he" will now know where to find her and will come for her. Cyclops assures her that "he" will have to get through the X-Men to reach her, reassuring Cipher enough for her to decide to drop her stealth. Following the split between Wolverine and Cyclops in "X-Men: Schism", Cipher decides to return to Westchester with Wolverine and become a student at the newly renamed Jean Grey School for Higher Learning.

She later joins the mutant nation of Krakoa, and the X-Corps.

== Powers and abilities ==
Cipher's abilities include full spectrum invisibility and complete stealth, able to mask even her psychic imprint from most telepaths with the exception of particularly high-level telepaths like Jean Grey and Professor X. She is also able to enter a phased state making her capable of passing through solid objects and levitating through the air. She also exhibits the ability to mask her voice to only those she chooses. Coupled with her invisibility, this makes her a highly adept spy, and she was employed as such by Cyclops. She was also able to extend her invisibility to objects.

She is also able to pilot the X-Men's jets.

== In other media ==
Cipher makes non-speaking cameo appearances in X-Men '97.
