= Mercury (Marvel Comics) =

Marvel Comics superhero

- Mercury as depicted in New X-Men: Hellions #3 (July 2005). Art by Clayton Henry.

Publication information
- Publisher: Marvel Comics
- First appearance: New Mutants vol. 2 #2 (August 2003)
- Created by: Nunzio DeFilippis; Christina Weir; Keron Grant

In-story information
- Alter ego: Cessily Kincaid
- Species: Human mutant
- Team affiliations: Jean Grey School Students; Hellions training squad X-Men in training Xavier Institute; New X-Men
- Abilities: Mercury mimicry granting: Superhuman strength and durability; Ability to cling to solid surfaces; Ability to alter her shape; Magical resistance

Mercury (Cessily Kincaid) is a character appearing in American comic books published by Marvel Comics. Created by Nunzio DeFilippis, Christina Weir, and Keron Grant, the character first appeared in New Mutants vol. 2 #2 (August 2003). Mercury is a teenage member of the student body at the Xavier Institute and a recurring member of the X-Men.

== Publication history ==
Mercury debuted in New Mutants vol. 2 #2 (August 2003), and was created by Nunzio DeFilippis, Christina Weir, and Keron Grant.

== Fictional character biography ==
=== Introduction ===
Cessily Kincaid, an Irish American, was raised in Portland, Oregon by her parents Mark and Jill, who, according to Nunzio DeFilippis, used to dote over her. When Cessily's mutant powers manifested, her parents were disgusted and made her stay indoors to hide her mutation. In response, she was sent to the Xavier Institute, where she befriended Julian Keller (Hellion) and became the roommate of Wallflower. After the school was rebuilt, she was selected by Emma Frost to join the Hellions.

=== Hellions ===
The Hellions squad win the squad challenge. During their summer vacation, they travel with Hellion to his home. There, they encounter the Kingmaker, from whom they each receive a trial wish. Cessily's wish is to have her parents accept and love her, a wish the Kingmaker grants by manipulating her parents with telepathy. When the Hellions refuse a permanent deal with the Kingmaker, Cessily's parents return to normal and Cessily returns to the institute, defeated.

=== Mercury Falling ===
After learning of Emma Frost's plan to have X-23 leave the school, Cessily takes X-23 to Salem Center for coffee to cool X-23 down. Just as Cessily realizes that X-23 has feelings for Hellion, the coffee shop explodes. Facility agents led by X-23's former handler, Kimura come for one of them. X-23, believing it is her, begs Cessily to leave, but not before Kimura shoots Cessily with an electric bullet, incapacitating her. After capturing Cessily, Kimura leaves before X-23 can recuperate from a grenade blast. At the lab, Cessily questions who they are and what they want, but is given no answers. Cessily has part of her metal removed and incorporated into Predator X, leaving her traumatized.

=== World War Hulk ===
During the "World War Hulk" storyline, Mercury is one of the students who intercept the Hulk. Mercury helps in keeping Hulk pinned down in the first attack but is knocked away. When X-23 blinds the Hulk, Mercury joins in taking him down alongside Surge, Beast, and X-23, but they are all knocked away when Hulk's eyes heal. Mercury convinces Hulk that his anger is wrongly directed towards the Illuminati, who banished him from Earth.

=== X-Infernus ===
Mercury and Rockslide are watching a training session between Pixie and Nightcrawler when Pixie stabs Nightcrawler with her soul dagger. They run in and move Pixie away from Nightcrawler's unconscious body. After the dagger is removed from Nightcrawler, Magik's sword emerges from his chest. When Magik arrives to reclaim her sword, Mercury engages her in combat and manages to stab her in the shoulder. Mercury is among the X-Men who venture into Limbo. There, Witchfire turns Colossus and Wolverine against Mercury and Rockslide, who get taken out.

=== Utopia ===
After Norman Osborn's defeat by the X-Men and the creation of Utopia, Mercury is involved in a media tug of war between Osborn, her father Mark, and their claims that she is being held captive against her will. Although she confronts her father over the phone during a live television broadcast, and disputes his claims going as far as to call him a bad father, her situation gets more complicated as Deadpool intervenes. Believing that he is doing them a favor, Deadpool attempts to kill Mark Kincaid on live television, but is stopped by Domino. In the meantime, the X-Men plan on having Mercury declared an emancipated minor to counter Osborn. Wolverine publicly rescues Mark from sniper fire, restoring the X-Men's damaged reputations.

=== X-Men Disassembled and Krakoa ===
Mercury opposes X-Man, but is subsequently transferred to the Age of X-Man plane, along with many other mutants. After X-Man releases the mutants, Mercury joins the mutant nation of Krakoa, and attends the Hellfire Gala. She is shown having romantic relations with Bling! and Loa.

== Powers and abilities ==
Mercury in her liquid form.

Mercury solidifying her arm into a weapon.

Mercury's body is composed of metal resembling her namesake. She can reshape or solidify it at will. Her molecular adhesion power grants her the ability to cling to solid surfaces and move her body at will. Mercury can also control pieces of her liquid mercury and bring them back to her. When forcefully separated from her body, her liquid mercury turns into dead flesh. Mercury's non-organic body makes her immune to the powers of Wither, which decay all organic matter.

== Reception ==
=== Critical response ===
- Deirdre Kaye of Scary Mommy called Mercury a "role model" and a "truly heroic" female character.
- Sportskeeda ranked Mercury 5th in their "5 Coolest Comic Book Characters With Elastic Abilities" list.
- MovieWeb ranked Mercury 7th in their "8 LGBTQ+ Marvel Comics Characters That Need to Be in the MCU" list.
- Screen Rant ranked Mercury 8th on "12 Most Powerful X-Men Heroes Who Can't Pass for Human", and included her in "10 Most Underrated X-Men in Marvel History".

== Other versions ==
An alternate universe version of Mercury appears in House of M.

== In other media ==
- Mercury makes non-speaking appearances in Wolverine and the X-Men as a member of the Acolytes.
- Mercury appears in Marvel Snap.
