= Spider-Man and the X-Men =

Comic book series

- Spider-Man and the X-Men issue 1

Publication information
- Publisher: Marvel Comics
- Schedule: Monthly
- Format: Limited series
- Genre: Superhero
- Publication date: December 2014 – April 2015
- No. of issues: 6
- Main character(s): X-Men; Spider-Man

Creative team
- Created by: Elliott Kalan
- Written by: Elliott Kalan
- Artist: Marco Failla
- Penciller: Stacy Lee

Collected editions
- Spider-Man and the X-Men: ISBN 978-0785197003

Spider-Man and the X-Men is a six-issue superhero limited series of comic books written by Elliott Kalan, drawn by Marco Failla, and published by Marvel Comics between December 2014 and April 2015.

== Publication history ==
Marvel began publishing a comic series titled Wolverine and the X-Men in 2011, but the series ended when the lead character died in 2014. Writer Elliott Kalan and artist Marco Failla continued the storyline, replacing Wolverine with Spider-Man. This volume lasted six issues from December 2014 to April 2015.

A trade paperback collecting all six issues was released August 4, 2015.

== Synopsis ==
Following the death of Wolverine, Spider-Man honors a request in his will to become a faculty member at the Jean Grey School for Higher Learning and tries to teach ethics to troubled students. At the same time, he secretly investigates the students because Wolverine asked him to locate a traitor. After a number of unrelated fights and adventures, one of his students, Ernst, reveals that she made a deal with the evil Mister Sinister in an effort to help No-Girl. Sinister betrays Ernst, who then works with her classmates and Spider-Man to defeat Sinister and save nearby civilians. Because of their teamwork, no one is expelled from the school and the students are allowed to go on weekly patrols with Spider-Man.

== Critical reception ==
Spider-Man and the X-Men #1 sold 61,952 copies the month of release, making it the 14th best selling issue in December 2014. It received an average score of 6.9/10 based on 20 reviews according to review aggregator Comic Book Roundup. Newsarama writer Pierce Lydon said, "Daily Show head writer Elliott Kalan is at the helm, but a throwaway cast and a concept borrowed in part from the last few years of Young Avengers titles doesn't help this one."
