= Young X-Men =

Comic book series

- Cover of Young X-Men 5 (Oct, 2008), art by Terry Dodson

Publication information
- Publisher: Marvel Comics
- Schedule: Monthly
- Format: Ongoing
- Publication date: April 2008 - March 2009

Creative team
- Created by: Marc Guggenheim; Yanick Paquette
- Written by: Marc Guggenheim
- Artist: Rafa Sandoval

Young X-Men is a comic book series published by Marvel Comics. It lasted for 12 issues, from April 2008 through March 2009, and was written by Marc Guggenheim. The series follows Ink, Dust, Wolf Cub, Rockslide, and Blindfold, a group of young mutants recruited by Cyclops.

== Plot summary ==
=== Final Genesis (Issues 1–5) ===
Blindfold has a vision of a team of X-Men battling Donald Pierce. Elsewhere, Cyclops is seen across the world, recruiting several teenaged mutants such as Eric Gitter, and former students Dust, Wolf Cub, and Rockslide. Rockslide refuses to join unless Cyclops accepts Blindfold, whom Cyclops had originally planned not to recruit, to be on the team as well.

After assembling the Young X-Men in the Danger Cave, Cyclops lectures them that he is reforming the X-Men, beginning with what may be the last generation of mutants. Their first mission is to take down what he claims is the new incarnation of the Brotherhood of Mutants, led by Sunspot and consisting of his friends and former teammates Cannonball, Magma, and Danielle Moonstar.

After they fail in training sessions against Brotherhood simulacra, Cyclops sends the group after Moonstar and Magma in small teams, each with a specific target. Dust, Rockslide, and Wolf Cub are sent after Magma, who responds violently by destroying the Blackbird. In the Colorado Rockies, Moonstar is taken down by an unseen force. Carrying the unconscious Moonstar back to their Blackbird, Ink asks Blindfold how her powers work. After she is done explaining, Ink knocks her unconscious and delivers her to Donald Pierce.

Rockslide, Wolf Cub, and Dust recover from their crash and attack Magma. Magma, though unprepared, is much more experienced. She turns Dust into glass and turns Rockslide into a pile of rocks. Dust is eviscerated by Wolf Cub, knocking her out and leaving Wolf Cub with a burn.

Cannonball and Sunspot are watching the battle in Los Angeles. After hearing nothing from Moonstar, they are convinced that the Young X-Men are coming after them. Graymalkin watches Ink talk to Cyclops in the shadows, Ink having lied about what happened to Blindfold and Moonstar. Graymalkin appears to be talking to himself, knowing something nobody knows, and vows to kill Cyclops. Moonstar confronts an awakening Blindfold and is very confused. Blindfold apologizes and points out that Donald Pierce is behind her. The other Young X-Men discuss Blindfold's vision and Dust's critical condition. Ink is surprised he is included in it as part of the team. Elsewhere, Pierce ambushes Moonstar and Blindfold, and disappears.

Ink, Rockslide, and Wolf Cub lead an attack on the Hellfire Club to fight Cannonball and Sunspot. Graymalkin attacks Cyclops back at the Danger Cave, leaving the Young X-Men on their own. Wolf Cub wounds Sunspot, angering Cannonball. Graymalkin takes out the lights to the Danger Cave, saying it gives him more power. He then exposes Cyclops as a disguised Donald Pierce. Once both teams learn the truth, they go after Pierce, but arrive too late to save Wolf Cub, who is killed by Pierce.

=== Membership changes ===
Following Wolf Cub's death, Cyclops asks Sunspot and Danielle Moonstar to teach the Young X-Men, and they both accept. Blindfold decides to leave the team, since she is no great contribution in battle. Moonstar asks Anole, a former member of the New X-Men, to join the new team.

Ink finds out he is not a mutant at all. The artist who made his tattoos is revealed to be a mutant and the one who gave Ink his powers. Ink decides, since he is not a mutant, there is no place for him with the Young X-Men and leaves.

Cipher previously warned Ink that his teammates were in trouble and he is needed to come with her to save them. Although Ink is very skeptical about Cipher's motivations or intentions, he goes along with Cipher as she appears to be affiliated with the X-Men. Cipher gives into Ink's demand to take him to his tattooist to give him some new abilities, even though she voices that she feels he is wasting his time while his friends are "dead or dying." She is still able to get him to the battle with the Y-Men in time, though, where Ink is able to turn the tide and save his teammates. Later that evening, Ink begins to ask Graymalkin about his connection to Cipher and just who she is, as Cipher spies on them.

=== Young X-Men Members ===
Character	Real name
"Cyclops" (trainer)	Donald Pierce (posing as Cyclops)
Moonstar (leader)	Danielle Moonstar
Sunspot (leader)	Roberto da Costa
Anole	Victor Borkowski
Blindfold	Ruth Aldine
Cipher	Alisa Tager
Dust	Sooraya Qadir
Graymalkin	Jonas Graymalkin
Ink	Eric Gitter
Rockslide	Santo Vaccarro
Wolf Cub	Nicholas Gleason

=== Cancellation ===
Young X-Men ended with issue #12, released in March 2009.

== Characters ==
Issues	Characters
#1–4	Blindfold, Dust, Ink, Rockslide, Wolf Cub
#5	Blindfold, Dust, Graymalkin, Ink, Rockslide, Wolf Cub
#6–8	Anole, Dust, Graymalkin, Ink, Mirage, Rockslide, Sunspot
#9–12	Anole, Cipher, Dust, Graymalkin, Ink, Mirage, Rockslide, Sunspot

== Creators ==
=== Writers ===
- Marc Guggenheim - Young X-Men #1–12

=== Art ===
- Yanick Paquette - Young X-Men #1–5
- Ben Oliver - Young X-Men #6–7, #10
- Rafa Sandoval - Young X-Men #8–9, #11–12

=== Cover art ===
- Terry Dodson and Rachel Dodson - Young X-Men #1–7
- Michael Ryan - Young X-Men #8
- Chris Bachalo - Young X-Men #9
- Billy Tan - Young X-Men #10
- Pasqual Ferry - Young X-Men #11–12

== Collections ==
Title	Material collected	Date Released	ISBN
Volume 1: Final Genesis	Young X-Men #1–5	December 2008	ISBN 0-7851-3154-X
Volume 2: Book Of Revelations	Young X-Men #6–12, X-Men: Manifest Destiny #3	June 2009	ISBN 0-7851-3165-5
