= Dust (character) =

Character in Marvel Comics

- Textless cover for New X-Men: Hellions #2 (Aug. 2005). Art by Clayton Henry.

Publication information
- Publisher: Marvel Comics
- First appearance: New X-Men #133 (Dec. 2002)
- Created by: Grant Morrison; Ethan Van Sciver

In-story information
- Alter ego: Sooraya Qadir
- Species: Human mutant
- Place of origin: Kandahar, Afghanistan
- Team affiliations: Hellions training squad New X-Men; Xavier Institute; X-Men in training Young X-Men; Jean Grey School Students; Champions
- Notable aliases: Congregation; Glass
- Abilities: Sand transformation; Superhuman durability; Telepathic resistance; Magical resistance

Dust (Sooraya Qadir) is a superheroine appearing in American comic books published by Marvel Comics. The character usually appears in X-Men-related comic books. Sooraya is a mutant with the ability to transform her body into a pliable cloud of dust.

== Publication history ==
Sooraya Qadir, alias Dust, was created by writer Grant Morrison and artist Ethan Van Sciver for the comic book series New X-Men #133 (December 2002). Dust has since appeared in various X-Men related comic book series, miniseries, and storylines.

== Fictional character biography ==
=== Origin ===
Sooraya Qadir is a Pashtun Muslim from Kandahar, Afghanistan, who possesses the mutant ability to transform into a sand-like substance. The character's origin story depicts her being kidnapped by slavers who attempt to remove her religious head covering, the niqab. This event triggers Sooraya's mutant power for the first time, killing her attackers. After being rescued by Wolverine and Fantomex, Sooraya enrolls at the Xavier Institute for Mutant Education and Leadership, a school dedicated to training mutants to control their powers and coexist with humanity.

After leadership of the school goes to Emma Frost and Cyclops, Sooraya is made a member of the Hellions training squad. After Sooraya's squad wins the field day competition and the academic year ends, Hellion invites the Hellion Squad to his home in Los Angeles for summer vacation. While there, the Hellion Squad encounters the Kingmaker, a powerful criminal with the power to make "dreams come true" through favors and connections, but for whom favors are expected in return. The Kingmaker finds Sooraya's mother and arranges for a trip back to Afghanistan so that Sooraya can reunite with her. She is soon flown back to L.A. to deliver on her part of the deal; stealing an advanced bio-weapon, which she later learns will be sold to Doctor Octopus in New York. The Hellions break their deal with the Kingmaker and end up destroying the weapon.

=== Decimation ===
During the events of "Decimation", the Scarlet Witch removes the powers of over 90% of the mutant population, reducing the population of Xavier's student body to only 27 students (including Dust). Sooraya and Wallflower are targeted by William Stryker's crusade against the Xavier Institute, as Nimrod has informed Stryker that the two pose a significant threat to him. Wallflower is killed, but Dust survives and goes on to take down most of Stryker's Purifiers by herself.

=== Young X-Men ===
Sometime after Cyclops disbands the institute, Sooraya returns to Afghanistan. Shortly afterwards, Cyclops asks her to return to New York to join his new team of Young X-Men. Unaware that "Cyclops" is actually Donald Pierce in disguise, the Young X-Men proceed with their first mission to take down a new Brotherhood of Mutants supposedly composed of the original New Mutants. In the ensuing battle against Magma, a blast of flame turns Dust's sand form into glass. Sooraya's glass form is later shattered in a battle between Donald Pierce and Graymalkin. However, Magma uses her powers to return the glass back into sand, resurrecting Dust.

During a conversation with the now-incarcerated Pierce, Sooraya reveals to him that she is dying. It is later revealed that her body is gradually transforming back into glass, with Beast giving her less than a week to live. Dust ultimately dies despite Beast's efforts to save her. Shortly before Dust is to be buried, Ink uses his Phoenix Force tattoo to revive her, with the strain leaving Ink catatonic.

=== Post-Schism ===
Initial solicits for the post-Schism X-Men split show Dust siding with the majority of younger X-Men and moving to Westchester as part of Wolverine's team. She initially sides with Wolverine's team, but ultimately chooses to remain with Cyclops' faction.

== Characterization ==
In line with Sooraya's character as a traditional Muslim, she chooses to don a loose-fitting black dress, with a niqab covering her face. Sooraya explains to her mother that she dresses this way because of the modesty it affords her from men. Her mother is happy that she lives somewhere where she is able to make those choices.

== Powers and abilities ==
Dust uses her powers

Dust is a transmorph, able to transform herself into an explosive cloud of sand-like silicon particles and maintain control of her sand form. She can reform her normal body at will or maintain an aerial based sand form in the shape of her human body. Her sandstorm form is resistant to most forms of injury. The form makes her hard to detect telepathically, according to Jean Grey and Professor X. She is also resistant to magic. She can use the form to attack, for instance, scouring the flesh from her enemies' bones like a sandstorm as well as enter people's lungs and scouring them from the inside.

== Reception ==
=== Critical reception ===
Peter Eckhardt of CBR.com called Dust one of the "favorite characters with connections to the 616 AAPI community," writing, "Qadir's Sunni Muslim faith is a critical part of her character. She's depicted almost exclusively wearing traditional Muslim dress consisting of a niqab atop an abaya. Although her faith occasionally creates conflict with other characters, Qadir's faith remains strong and makes her one of the most positive representations of Muslim women in speculative fiction." Marc Buxton of Den of Geek said, "We have the devout Muslim warrior Dust, one of the bravest X-Men to join Xavier’s team in the 21st century. When a slave trader forcibly tried to remove her niqab, Sooraya Qadir manifested her power to turn her body into sand and flayed him alive. Dust remains one of X-Men’s bravest, using her unwavering faith and powers to help other young mutants. For Dust, her eyes tell the whole story, of faith and pain, of belief and bravery."

=== Accolades ===
- In 2014, BuzzFeed ranked Dust 81st in their "95 X-Men Members Ranked From Worst To Best" list.
- In 2017, CBR ranked Dust 11th in their "15 Muslim Characters In Comics You Should Know" list.
- In 2017, Den of Geek included Dust in their "40 X-Men Characters Who Haven't Appeared in the Movies But Should" list.
- In 2020, CBR ranked Dust 7th in their "10 Most Powerful Members Of The Hellions" list.
- In 2021, Screen Rant included Dust in their "10 Most Powerful Members Of The Champions" list.
- In 2022, CBR ranked Dust 2nd in their "10 Best X-Men Mutants Who Haven't Been In A Movie Yet" list and 6th in their "X-Men: 10 Heroes Who'd Be Perfect Assassins" list.

== Other versions ==
Alternate universe versions of Dust appear in House of M, X-Men: The End, and Age of X.

== In other media ==
- Dust appears in Wolverine and the X-Men, voiced by Tara Strong.
- Dust makes non-speaking cameo appearances in X-Men '97.
- Dust makes a cameo appearance in Deadpool's ending in Marvel vs. Capcom 3: Fate of Two Worlds.
- Dust appears as a playable character in Marvel Contest of Champions.
