= Blindfold (character) =

Comic book fictional character

- Blindfold. Art by John Cassaday.

Publication information
- Publisher: Marvel Comics
- First appearance: Astonishing X-Men, vol. 3 #4 (Oct. 2004) (mentioned); Astonishing X-Men vol. 3 #7 (Jan. 2005) (fully)
- Created by: Joss Whedon; John Cassaday

In-story information
- Alter ego: Ruth Aldine
- Species: Human mutant
- Team affiliations: Xavier Institute; X-Men-In-Training; Young X-Men; Jean Grey School Students
- Notable aliases: Destiny
- Abilities: Chaos manipulation; Reality anchoring; Astral projection; Retrocognition; Psionic blasts; Clairvoyance; Precognition; Force fields; Telekinesis; Telepathy

Blindfold (Ruth Aldine) is a fictional character, a mutant appearing in American comic books published by Marvel Comics. The character is usually depicted as a member of the student body of the Xavier Institute in X-Men-related comic books. She first appeared in Astonishing X-Men, vol. 3 #7 and was created by Joss Whedon and John Cassaday.

== Fictional character biography ==
Ruth Aldine is a student at the Xavier Institute. Since childhood, she had worn a blindfold to cover up her lack of eyes; this inspired her codename, Blindfold. She is first mentioned by Hisako Ichiki and Wing before their confrontation with Ord. Hisako and Wing both state that Blindfold had a big mouth because she had read Wing's mind and informed Hisako of his dreams of joining the X-Men. Wing was upset, but Hisako told him not to worry, as she wanted to be an X-Man too, and that Blindfold was just lonely.

=== Torn ===
Due to Cassandra Nova's manipulation, Beast becomes feral and attacks Hisako. She scares him off, but passes out from exhaustion. Blindfold takes Hisako to the infirmary, where she finds the unconscious bodies of Colossus and Cyclops. Eventually, Shadowcat makes her way back to the Institute and asks the girls to tell her everything they know. When Kitty leaves to find out who exactly is attacking, Cyclops manages to contact Blindfold and instruct her to give Beast a special box containing a ball of string. He also asks her to keep his mind safe from any sort of psychic attacks. During the middle of the battle, Ord and the Danger Room entity interrupt and a battle begins between the X-Men, Hisako, Ord, and Danger. Suddenly, S.W.O.R.D. beams the team, Danger, Ord, and Hisako into a spaceship headed for Breakworld.

=== Quest for Magik ===
Blindfold, during an evening of storytelling, relays the history of the deceased Illyana Rasputin to her classmates. Her story emotionally bothers some of them as Blindfold begins including aspects that both recently happened and were about to happen. She explains that the demon lord Belasco reclaimed the realm of Limbo by defeating its previous mistress, Amanda Sefton. Belasco cast her out of Limbo and began searching for a way to bring back Illyana Rasputin from the dead. After saying this, Blindfold and the other students are attacked by demons sent by Belasco. Blindfold survives and is returned to the X-Mansion with the rest of the students.

=== Blinded by the Light ===
Cannonball is given knowledge of the plans of the Marauders and implies that Blindfold is second on a targets list for elimination by them and the Acolytes, orchestrated by Mister Sinister. Blindfold speaks to the New X-Men saying that whatever is supposed to happen to her can be prevented by Elixir. She grabs his hands, touching the black part of his skin that represents death and the gold part that represents life at the same time. Blindfold enters a form of stasis that makes her appear to be dead, but later awakens. She gives further cryptic predictions about the X-Men's situation, saying that soon Hellion, Pixie, Nightcrawler, and someone else she cannot recall will be hurt.

Blindfold's predictions are soon proven correct when Lady Deathstrike maims Hellion, Scalphunter seriously injures Nightcrawler and Pixie injures herself by blindly teleporting the team from the Reavers. The other person Blindfold mentions was apparently Forge, who was injured by Bishop; or perhaps Professor X.

=== Young X-Men ===
Blindfold has a nightmare in which one of her future teammates, the Young X-Men, is killed by Donald Pierce. She tells Rockslide her premonition of the soon-to-be-formed team and mentions the death of one of their future teammates. As predicted, Cyclops arrives at the cafe and offers Rockslide a place on the team, but he also reveals that he did not wish to recruit Blindfold. Rockslide refuses to join the team unless she is allowed to as well, noting that Blindfold's vision included her on the squad as well. Cyclops concedes, and Blindfold takes her place on the squad.

Cyclops orders Blindfold and Ink to bring in Danielle Moonstar, who is apparently a member of a new Brotherhood of Mutants. However, Ink betrays Blindfold and delivers both girls to Donald Pierce, who is revealed to be impersonating Cyclops. Eventually they are freed. Blindfold's prediction comes true when Wolf Cub is killed. Blindfold relocates to San Francisco with the rest of the Young X-Men, but she leaves the team. Cyclops states that Blindfold will only be called in as needed.

When Cipher reveals her presence to the Young X-Men, Cyclops explains that she had been there in secret under his orders helping the Young X-Men and much earlier, including during Beast's attack on Blindfold during Astonishing X-Men. Blindfold's seemingly one-sided conversations during that time (and others) were actually directed toward Cipher, who was able to mask her part of the conversation using her stealth powers. Blindfold is the only other besides Jean Grey, Cyclops, and Graymalkin who were aware of Cipher's existence prior to the events of Young X-Men. The two develop a friendship during this time.

=== Necrosha ===
During the "Necrosha" event, the newly resurrected Destiny contacts Blindfold by accident while trying to reach her foster daughter Rogue. Destiny saves her life from being crushed by falling rubble and gives her some information to help combat Selene's forces. After Destiny breaks contact with her, she believes she made a grave mistake. This mistake is revealed to be that Blindfold is possessed by Proteus.

Blindfold is eventually freed thanks to Magneto, who uses his powers to disrupt Proteus' energy matrix. During a conversation with Destiny, it is revealed that she and Destiny are distant relatives and that Blindfold's mother had sacrificed herself to save her from her brother, for what reason has yet to be revealed.

=== Age of X ===
Blindfold later confides in Rogue that she had visions of an entity, a mysterious force that wanted to change everything, and once it started it would not stop until everything had been destroyed. However, she cannot identify what it is because it keeps hiding around the periphery of her visions. Rogue, along with Madison Jeffries, eventually find a squid-like monster that had escaped from Emplate's dimension, which they think to be the entity Blindfold sensed. After Rogue defeats the creature, Blindfold reveals that the threat is still out there.

The world around Blindfold changes dramatically and Blindfold is next seen in the jail of Fortress X during the "Age of X" storyline. She is one of the mutants considered too dangerous to roam free and is under Danger's supervision. She seems to be the Earth-616 version of the character and the only person seen so far with any memory of the mainstream reality.

=== Destiny of X ===
Shortly before the beginning of the Krakoan Age, Blindfold goes into hiding with the Morlocks to avoid anti-mutant violence. She receives visions of several possible future versions of her dying and decides to commit suicide to avoid being killed violently. After the beginning of the Krakoan Age, Blindfold is resurrected by the Five.

== Characteristics ==
=== Powers and abilities ===
Blindfold was born without eyes, a condition known as anophthalmia. Her blindness is part of her mutation in the sense that she has no eyes, but rather has skin where eyes would normally be. However, in exchange, she is psionic, though the full extent of her abilities is unknown. She has been shown using telepathy and can sometimes psychically sense events when other telepaths apparently did not, such as Belasco pulling everyone inside the mansion into Limbo. She is able to use telepathy has been said to be a clairvoyant, retrocognitive, and precognitive mutant, meaning that she is able to see distant, past, and future places or events. With her level of power, she was immune — albeit to a limited degree — to the reality warp caused by Legion's 'Moira' personality that created the 'Age of X', allowing her to be aware that something was wrong with the world. This goes into full reality anchoring when Legion undid his own birth erasing himself from existence, Blindfold was the only individual to remember David even lived after time and space had reset itself when her missing abilities were restored.

Blindfold's precognitive abilities are neutralized while in the presence of Destiny, another precognitive (and vice versa). Destiny explains that this is because two precogs in close presence to one another "are like two magnets pressed together positive pole to positive pole" and will negatively affect one another's precognitive abilities and powers.

Blindfold also had a slew of other psychic abilities tied to her mutant powers which she had been developing since her early childhood. She displayed telekinesis and the ability to read and analyze all possible futures and probabilistic outcomes, but those powers were taken from her by brother, resulted in her impaired mind state. Over time however she has shown remarkable leaps in bounds with her initial ability, similar to Nate Grey, Blindfold can materialize astral plane energy to give her own astral projection a tangible form. With some coaxing from David Haller would showcase herself an adequate match for other powerful telepaths such as the Stepford Cuckoos, and once at the fullest manifest of her powers were returned to her, Blindfold not only regained her mental stability but also the majority of her missing power. She was able to materialize energy from the astral plane as a form of psionic armor enabling her to battle the psionic entity that sprang forth from Legion's damaged psyche.

=== Mannerisms ===
Blindfold has a unique speech pattern. It includes the odd insertion into her sentences of words of politeness, including "please," "thank you," "you're welcome," and "pardon." She's also been known to oddly insert the words "yes" and "no" into her sentences. The reason she has this pattern is explained in X-Men Legacy when Legion tries to wake her up from her coma: her brother, Luca, was a mutant hater and tried to kill her when she was little, but in a fit of rage, he killed their mother. Years later, Blindfold attended his execution and, just after he died, his astral projection attacked her and stole half of her powers, leaving her "broken". When telepathically projecting herself into Legion's mind in the same issue, Blindfold did not demonstrate this speech pattern, instead speaking in a normal manner and acting with more confidence than is usually the case.

Given that she is both a telepath and a precognitive, she often answers questions before they are asked and responds to comments before they are spoken aloud. As a result, she tends to turn what would ordinarily be a two-way conversation into a monologue. While she does not always do this, it may be assumed that she is allowing the other person or persons to say what she already knows they will say out of politeness' sake.

Some of her "one-sided" conversations in Astonishing X-Men and Young X-Men were explained as having been with her friend Cipher, who remained concealed from all others around them via her mutant powers. After the end of Simon Spurrier's run on X-Men Legacy, Blindfold regains her centre of focus, gaining a normalized speech pattern.

== Reception ==
=== Accolades ===
- In 2014, BuzzFeed ranked Blindfold 79th in their "95 X-Men Members Ranked From Worst To Best" list.
- In 2016, CBR.com ranked Blindfold 9th in their "X-Men's Most Mentally Mighty Mutants" list.
- In 2020, Scary Mommy included Blindfold in their "Looking For A Role Model? These 195+ Marvel Female Characters Are Truly Heroic" list.
