= Rockslide (character) =

- Rockslide; Art by Chris Bachalo

Publication information
- Publisher: Marvel Comics
- First appearance: New Mutants (vol. 2) #3 (September 2003)
- Created by: Nunzio DeFilippis; Christina Weir; Carlo Barberi

In-story information
- Alter ego: Santo Vaccarro
- Species: Human mutant
- Team affiliations: Hellions training squad New X-Men; Xavier Institute; Young X-Men
- Abilities: Superhuman strength, durability and endurance Ability to transform into a "golem" form by assimilating surrounding rock and earth into a gestalt shell and explosively detonate the shell and reform at will

Rockslide (Santo Vaccarro) is a fictional mutant superhero appearing in American comic books published by Marvel Comics. The character has been depicted as a member of the X-Men, a student in the Xavier Institute, and a member of the former Hellions squad therein. After M-Day, he was one of only 28 students to retain his powers. He is best friends with Julian Keller (Hellion) and is extremely close to and protective of Cessily Kincaid (Mercury). Despite his earlier appearances as a stereotypical school bully, he has evolved into a good-natured (though extremely boastful) and fiercely protective friend to most of the school's students.

== Publication history ==
Rockslide first appeared in New Mutants vol. 2 #3, and was created by Nunzio DeFilippis, Christina Weir, and Carlo Barberi. The character made subsequent appearances in the series New X-Men, Young X-Men, and Wolverine and the X-Men as a student of the X-Men. Rockslide appeared in the series Spider-Man and the X-Men, where he was part of a special class taught by Spider-Man.

Rockslide was killed during the 2020 event X of Swords and returned in 2024, near the end of the Krakoan Age. In a 2024 interview with AIPT, X-Men editor Jordan D. White stated that he originally intended for Glob Herman to be killed. However, writer Ed Brisson objected to Herman's death, so White chose for Rockslide to die instead.

== Fictional character biography ==
An Italian-American mutant from Boston, Santo Vaccarro is sent to the Xavier Institute, where he befriends Julian Keller (Hellion) and the would-be Hellions. He is originally advised by Iceman, but is selected by Emma Frost to be part of her prized Hellions squad.

On their summer vacation, the Hellions encounter the Kingmaker, who temporarily grants each of them a wish. Rockslide's wish is to become a world-class wrestler. When the Hellions refuse a permanent deal with the Kingmaker, the Kingmaker shatters Rockslide's body with a laser blast. Hellion uses his telekinesis to reassemble Rockslide, and together the Hellions defeat the Kingmaker.

=== Decimation ===
Rockslide is one of 198 mutants who retain their powers following M-Day, when the Scarlet Witch removes the powers of most of Earth's mutants. With the mutant population drastically decreased, the Sentinel O*N*E* Squad is sent to watch over the X-Mansion, which houses Rockslide and the remaining mutants.

=== World War Hulk ===
During the "World War Hulk" storyline, Rockslide is one of the students who battle the Hulk when he attacks the institute. He knocks over the Hulk so the other students can hold him down, but is knocked away when Hulk regains his strength. When Rockslide attacks him alone, it appears that Hulk knows who he is and what he can do. Hulk rips off Rockslide's arms and legs, then throws them far away. His limbs are eventually located and returned to him after Hulk leaves.

=== Krakoan Age ===
In the storyline "X of Swords", Rockslide befriends the Summoner, who later betrays and kills him. When the Five attempt to resurrect Rockslide, they inadvertently create an amalgamation of Rockslide's alternate universe counterparts who is dubbed Wrongslide. This process overwrites all previous backups of Rockslide, making a true resurrection impossible. Rockslide is eventually resurrected, but is trapped in the White Hot Room before being freed.

== Powers and abilities ==
Rockslide in his Limbo rock form.

In his initial appearance, Rockslide's body was made of granite, giving him superhuman strength, endurance, durability and the ability to fire his hands as projectiles. After Rockslide was destroyed and reformed his body, Beast theorized that Rockslide is a psychic entity who forms a body by assimilating nearby earthen material, which allows him to heal himself if injured. Rockslide's original ability to fire off his limbs is seemingly lost in his new reformed bodies. Instead, the energy used to propel his limbs is now explosively released from his entire body, obliterating his form, from which he can recover.

Rockslide's appearance in his rock form depends on the material absorbed; for instance, he assumed a molten form after absorbing rock from Limbo.

== In other media ==
- Rockslide makes a non-speaking appearance in the Wolverine and the X-Men episode "Hindsight".
- Rockslide makes non-speaking appearances in X-Men '97.
- Rockslide appears in Marvel Snap.
