= List of X-Men enemies =

This is a list of some of the major foes of the Marvel Comics superhero team, the X-Men.

== Central rogues' gallery ==
| Villain | First appearance | Description |
|---|---|---|
| Apocalypse | X-Factor #5 (June 1986) | En Sabah Nur is an ancient and immortal mutant with an array of superhuman abilities ranging from shapeshifting to immense superhuman strength and durability. Apocalypse's ultimate goal is to eradicate all life from Earth in order to reshape it in his image. |
| Avalanche | The Uncanny X-Men #141 (January 1981) | Dominikos Petrakis is a mutant with the ability to generate seismic waves from his hands. He most often uses this ability to create tremors and earthquakes. Avalanche was first recruited into Mystique's Brotherhood of Mutants and has remained a prominent X-Men villain since. A second, unnamed Avalanche appeared after the apparent death of Petrakis. |
| Black Tom Cassidy | The Uncanny X-Men #101 (October 1976) | Thomas Cassidy is a mutant with the ability to channel bio-kinetic energy into concussive blasts with wooden objects and later gained the ability to manipulate plant life. Black Tom is often seen with his partner, Juggernaut. |
| Blob | X-Men #3 (January 1964) | Frederick J. Dukes is a mutant with elastic, blubbery skin. Morbidly obese, Blob is immune to most physical harm. He also possesses a personal gravity field which enabled him to render himself immovable. Blob was a member of the original Brotherhood of Mutants and has been one of the X-Men's most recurring and persistent adversaries. Although Blob appeared to lose his powers after Decimation, he has since appeared with his powers intact. |
| Bolivar Trask | X-Men #14 (November 1965) | Bolivar Trask was an anthropologist who saw the rise of mutants as a threat to humanity. Trask was the developer of the robot guardians known as the Sentinels. Trask later realized the errors of his ways and sacrificed himself to destroy the Sentinels' base. |
| The Brood | The Uncanny X-Men #155 (March 1982) | A race of savage, insectoid extraterrestrials that have existed for thousands of years. |
| Cassandra Nova | New X-Men #114 (July 2001) | Cassandra Nova is a mummudrai, an astral, bodiless being, and the ideological dark shadow to her twin Professor X. |
| Dark Beast | X-Men Alpha (1995) | Henry Phillip McCoy is a twisted version of Beast from the Age of Apocalypse reality. Dark Beast escaped the Age of Apocalypse reality into Earth-616 and has since appeared as a major nemesis of the X-Men. |
| Dark Phoenix | The Uncanny X-Men #134 (June 1980) | Jean Grey became the Dark Phoenix after suffering from manipulative illusions created by Mastermind of the Hellfire Club. There had been other hosts for the Dark Phoenix like the Phoenix five. |
| Deathbird | Ms. Marvel #9 (September 1977) | Cal'Syee Neramani is a Shi'ar warrior and the older sister of Shi'ar empress Lilandra Neramani. Exiled from the Shi'ar empire, Deathbird sought to reclaim her throne which put her at odds with Lilandra's allies, the X-Men. |
| Exodus | X-Factor #92 (July 1993) | Bennet du Paris is a powerful mutant with telepathy, telekinesis, teleportation, and immortality. Exodus was a loyal member of the Acolytes, worshipers of Magneto, for many years. |
| High Evolutionary | The Mighty Thor #134 (November 1966) | Herbert Edgar Wyndham was once a normal scientist and protegee of Mister Sinister who became a superhuman cyborg with massive intellect. |
| Juggernaut | X-Men #12 (July 1965) | Cain Marko is Charles Xavier's stepbrother and one of the X-Men's earliest enemies. After finding the mystical gem of Cyttorak, Marko is empowered and becomes the Juggernaut, a massive, unstoppable creature capable of shattering mountains. Despite lacking the mutant gene, Juggernaut is often a member of various incarnations of the Brotherhood of Mutants. |
| Lady Deathstrike | Daredevil #197 (August 1983) | Yuriko Oyama is the daughter of Japanese crime boss Lord Dark Wind. After the death of her lover, Oyama sought out Spiral to enhance her body. She was modified with adamantium bones and talons, and took the name Lady Deathstrike. |
| Magneto | X-Men #1 (September 1963) | Max "Erik Magnus" Eisenhardt is a mutant with the ability to generate and control magnetic fields. A close friend of Professor X, Magneto clashed with the X-Men over the philosophy that mutants and humans could coexist. A survivor of The Holocaust, Magneto believed mutants were superior to humans. Magneto has formed several groups over the years to fight for mutant supremacy, including the Brotherhood of Mutants and the Acolytes. Magneto has also been a member of the X-Men. |
| Mastermind | X-Men #4 (March 1964) | Jason Wyngarde was a mutant with the power to create illusions. A member of several villain groups such as the Brotherhood of Mutants, Factor Three, and the Hellfire Club, Mastermind is largely known for being responsible for Jean Grey's transition into the Dark Phoenix. He later died from the Legacy Virus after he begs for Jean Grey's forgiveness. Mastermind was later resurrected when the X-Men relocated to Krakoa. Mastermind's daughters, Martinique Jason and Regan Wyngarde, later carried on his legacy. |
| Mister Sinister | The Uncanny X-Men #221 (September 1987) | Nathaniel Essex is a genetically altered human and scientific genius, and one of the X-Men's deadliest enemies. Sinister first rose to prominence when he ordered his assassins, the Marauders, to hunt down and kill the sewer-dwelling mutants known as the Morlocks. He later played key roles as a mastermind in the shadows through events such as Inferno and Messiah CompleX. Mister Sinister has mastered genetic cloning, which he uses to create clones of the Marauders and others. Although not a mutant at birth, Essex genetically engineered the X-Gene of John Proudstar into his own genome. In exchange for his collection of mutant DNA, Essex was welcomed to the mutant nation of Krakoa, where he serves in the Quiet Council of Krakoa. |
| Mojo | Longshot #3 (November 1985) | An obese, yellow-skinned alien from a race known as the Spineless Ones, Mojo is a slaver who rules the Mojoverse, a dimension obsessed with television programs and celebrities. |
| Mystique | Ms. Marvel #16 (April 1978) | Raven Darkholme is a mutant with shapeshifting abilities. While she first appeared as a villain of Ms. Marvel, Mystique has become one of the most iconic and recurring adversaries for the X-Men. |
| Omega Red | X-Men (vol. 2) #4 (January 1992) | Arkady Rossovich is a serial killer who underwent experiments that equipped him with retractable tentacle-like coils in each of his arms. He is also a mutant with the ability to generate pheromones that can kill within seconds. |
| Pyro | The Uncanny X-Men #141 (January 1981) | The original Pyro, St. John Allerdyce, is an Australian mutant with pyrokinesis, the ability to manipulate flame. Pyro has served with multiple incarnations of the Brotherhood of Mutants, as well as the government-led Freedom Force. A second Pyro, Simon Lasker, joined Mesmero's Brotherhood of Mutants, but later reformed and joined the X-Men. |
| Sabretooth | Iron Fist #14 (August 1977) | Victor Creed is a mutant with a regenerative healing factor similar to Wolverine's. Like Wolverine, Sabretooth gained an adamantium skeleton and claws under unknown circumstances. He was the first mutant to break the laws of the newly founded mutant nation Krakoa and was banished to a void within the island. |
| Sauron | X-Men #59 (August 1969) | Dr. Karl Lykos is a human geneticist who was transformed into a pterodactyl-like humanoid. As the winged Sauron, Lykos is an energy vampire who must absorb the lifeforce of those around him for sustenance. If Lykos absorbs a mutant's energy, he is transformed into Sauron, and his savage mind takes over. |
| Sebastian Shaw | The Uncanny X-Men #129 (January 1980) | Sebastian Shaw was a mutant with the ability to absorb kinetic and thermal energy directed at him. He was the leader of the New York branch of the Hellfire Club, where he ruthlessly sacrificed mutant interests for the sake of money and power. He later becomes the Black King of the Hellfire Trading Company and has employed his son Shinobi Shaw and the twin mercenaries Fenris as his Black Bishop and Black Knights, respectively, to grapple power of Krakoan trade from Emma Frost and Kitty Pryde. |
| Shadow King | The Uncanny X-Men #117 (January 1979) | Amahl Farouk is an Egyptian mutant with powerful telepathic abilities and the power to possess other beings while on the Astral Plane. The Shadow King played a key role in Storm's origin, and has often faced off against Professor X. |
| Silver Samurai | Daredevil #111 (July 1974) | Kenuichio Harada was a mutant with the ability to charge his katana with a tachyon field. Harada's son, Shingen Harada, later took up the mantle of Silver Samurai. |
| Spiral | Longshot #1 (September 1985) | Rita Wayword is a human who was forcibly modified into the sorceress known as Spiral by her former master, Mojo. As Spiral, Wayword has powerful mystical abilities able to defeat the X-Men singlehandedly. She briefly served with Freedom Force and later opened a "Body Shoppe" where she modified others, such as Lady Deathstrike and the other Reavers, as well as the X-Men's Psylocke. |
| Toad | X-Men #4 (March 1964) | Mortimer Toynbee is a mutant with frog-like abilities, including superhuman leg and tongue strength. Toad served as Magneto's henchman for several years until he formed his own version of the Brotherhood of Mutants. His leadership was temporary, however, as he resumed his status as an underling in later incarnations of the team. |
| White Queen | The Uncanny X-Men #129 (January 1980) | Emma Frost is a mutant with powerful telepathic abilities, and later a secondary mutation that allows Frost to transform into an indestructible diamond form. While she first appeared as the White Queen of the Hellfire Club, she later joined the X-Men and became a prominent member of the group. |
| William Stryker | X-Men: God Loves, Man Kills (1982) | A religious fanatic with a deep hatred of mutants. |

== Other recurring antagonists ==
| Villain | First appearance | Description |
|---|---|---|
| The Adversary | The Uncanny X-Men #188 (December 1984) | A demon with reality-warping powers. He is often associated with the X-Men member Forge. |
| Ahab | Fantastic Four Annual #23 (July 1990) | Roderick Campbell is a time-traveling cyborg from the future with the ability to generate energy harpoons. Ahab was a key figure in the origin of Rachel Summers, the future daughter of Cyclops and Jean Grey. He later served Apocalypse as the Horseman of Famine. |
| Azazel | The Uncanny X-Men #428 (October 2003) | A member of the demonic mutant species known as the Neyaphem. Azazel is not the father of Nightcrawler but was a genetic template for Nightcrawler's parentage. |
| Bastion | X-Men #52 (May 1996) | An android who wished to terminate all mutants. |
| Belasco | Ka-Zar the Savage #11 (February 1982) | An ancient, evil sorcerer serving the Elder Gods, Belasco was the ruler of the realm known as Limbo. Belasco was a key figure in Magik's origin. |
| Bella Donna | X-Men (vol. 2) #8 (May 1992) | Bella Donna Boudreaux is a mutant with astral projection abilities, as well as the power to generate plasma blasts. A member of the Assassins Guild, Bella Donna was a prominent figure in Gambit's past. |
| Caliban | The Uncanny X-Men #148 (August 1981) | An albino mutant and former member of the sewer-dwelling Morlocks, Caliban had the ability to sense and track any mutant. Originally an ally to the X-Men, Caliban was corrupted by Apocalypse and transformed into a Horseman of Apocalypse shortly after the Mutant Massacre. He later overcame this corruption and joined the X-Men. |
| Callisto | The Uncanny X-Men #169 (May 1983) | Leader of the underground-dwelling mutant community known as the Morlocks, Callisto is a mutant with enhanced senses. |
| Cameron Hodge | X-Factor #1 (February 1986) | Cameron Hodge was a human who deceived X-Factor by posing as an ally. But in reality, he despised mutants and plotted to kill the members of X-Factor. He was later killed and bonded with the Phalanx. |
| Candra | Gambit #1 (December 1993) | A member of the Externals, Candra is a mutant with powerful telekinetic abilities and immortality. Candra is most often associated with the Assassins Guild and the Thieves Guild, bestowing great powers to those who serve her. |
| Cobalt Man | X-Men #31 (February, 1967) | Ralph Roberts was a scientist studying cobalt and nuclear radiation. He used his research to make a suit similar to Iron Man planning to give it the military. |
| Corina Ellis | Free Comic Book Day 2024: Blood Hunt/X-Men | The warden of Graymalkin Prison, Ellis imprisons mutants and uses them as tools. |
| Crimson Commando | The Uncanny X-Men #215 (March 1987) | Frank Bohannan was a mutant with peak human physical prowess. Along with Super Sabre and Stonewall, Crimson Commando was a World War II veteran who joined Freedom Force. During a mission with Freedom Force, Crimson Commando was gravely injured and forced to undergo cybernetic modifications. |
| Cyber | Marvel Comics Presents #85 (September 1991) | Silas Burr is a mutant with superhuman strength. He later modified his body with adamantium, granting himself indestructible skin. After Wolverine lost the adamantium, Genesis captured and killed Cyber in attempt to bond his adamantium with the X-Man's. Cyber later escaped Hell and became the new Hornet. |
| Danger | Astonishing X-Men (vol. 3) #9 (2005) | Danger is a sentient AI robot that is the physical manifestation of the Danger Room. It is agender, but has taken the form and shape of a female android. |
| Deadpool | New Mutants #98 (February 1991) | Wade Wilson is a mutated human (not a mutant) with regenerative abilities and enhanced strength. After facing terminal cancer, Wilson joined Canada's Weapon X program where he became the "merc with a mouth" known as Deadpool. Deadpool battled X-Force on several occasions, but later joined the X-Men and several variations of the team. |
| Destiny | The Uncanny X-Men #141 (January 1981) | Irene Adler is a blind mutant with precognitive powers. Mystique's lover, Destiny foresaw many future events which she kept in a diary. Following Destiny's death, Mystique had her revived using the Krakoan resurrection process. |
| D'Ken | X-Men #97 (February 1976) | D'Ken Neramani was the evil brother of Lilandra Neramani and Deathbird. |
| Donald Pierce | The Uncanny X-Men #132 (April 1980) | Donald Pierce is a cyborg and member of the Hellfire Club and the Reavers. Pierce joined the Hellfire Club to kill the other members of the Inner Circle, all of whom were mutants. He later created the cyborg mercenary group called the Reavers to battle the X-Men. He has since appeared as a member of both teams, alternating his allegiance to suit his whims. |
| Erik the Red | X-Men #97 (February 1976) | Davan Shakari is an extraterrestrial bounty hunter employed by D'Ken Neramani of the Shi'ar empire. |
| Fabian Cortez | X-Men (vol. 2) #1 (October 1991) | Fabian Cortez is one of the founding members of the Acolytes, mutants devoted to Magneto. Cortez has the mutant ability to empower other mutants around him, though secretly he would slowly absorb his victims' lifeforces. Despite his many betrayals, Fabian Cortez was invited to the mutant island of Krakoa. |
| Fenris | The Uncanny X-Men #194 (June 1985) | Andreas and Andrea von Strucker are mutant twins with the abilities to fly and generate energy blasts while in contact with each other. |
| Frenzy | X-Factor #4 (May 1986) | Joanna Cargill is a mutant with superhuman strength and indestructible skin. Frenzy has worked for the Alliance of Evil, the Femizons, the Acolytes, and the Marauders, though she later reformed and aligned with the X-Men. |
| Gamesmaster | The Uncanny X-Men #283 (December 1991) | A mysterious mutant with powerful telepathic abilities. Alongside Selene, the Gamesmaster organized and created the Upstarts, a competition for wealthy young individuals to kill mutants. |
| Garokk | Astonishing Tales #2 (November 1970) | Also known as the Petrified Man, Garokk is a deity worshiped in the Savage Land. |
| Gatecrasher | Captain Britain #3 (March 1985) | Leader of band of the extraterrestrial bounty hunters known as Technet, Gatecrasher is a massive, blue-skinned female alien with telepathic abilities. She is most often associated as an antagonist for Captain Britain and Excalibur. |
| Gauntlet | X-Factor #65 (April 1991) | Gauntlet was the original leader of the Dark Riders. A member of the Inhumans, Gauntlet has been a member of each incarnation of the Dark Riders, though he was later killed by Magneto. |
| Genesis | X-Force #5 (December 1991) | Tyler Dayspring was the son of Cable who had previously taken the codename Tolliver. As Genesis, Dayspring took over leadership of the Dark Riders and plotted against Wolverine. |
| Gideon | New Mutants #98 (February 1991) | A member of the Externals and prominent adversary of X-Force. Gideon has the mutant ability to take on the powers of nearby mutants. He was killed by Selene along with the majority of other Externals, though he has since returned without explanation. |
| Goblin Queen / Red Queen | The Uncanny X-Men #168 (April 1983) | Madelyne Pryor is a clone of Jean Grey and the first wife of Cyclops. |
| Graydon Creed | The Uncanny X-Men #299 (April 1993) | Graydon Creed was the human son of Sabretooth and Mystique. |
| Haven | X-Factor #96 (November 1993) | Radha Dastoor was a woman who believed that mutants and humans would become unified after a series of catastrophes. Haven possessed transdimensional powers that enabled her to teleport herself and others to her own pocket dimension, and battled X-Factor multiple times. She was later killed after giving birth to the Adversary. |
| Hazard | X-Men (vol. 2) #12 (September 1992) | Carter Ryking was a mutant with plasma generation. A childhood friend of Professor X, Ryking was experimented on by Mister Sinister at a young age. He later lost his powers during Decimation, which drove him insane. He was killed while in Ryking Institute, a mental asylum. |
| Holocaust | X-Men Alpha (February 1995) | Created by Scott Lobdell and Roger Cruz. Originally known as Nemesis, Holocaust originates from the timeline of "Age of Apocalypse" and claims to be the son of Apocalypse. In 2018, CBR.com ranked Holocaust 22nd in their "Age Of Apocalypse: The 30 Strongest Characters In Marvel's Coolest Alternate World" list, and MSN included the character in the 2024 list of the "10 Strongest X-Men Villains" and rated him as a "horrifyingly powerful mutant". Scholar of religion and philosophy Gareth Evans-Jones observed that topics of persecution and injustice in the X-Men comics invite comparisons to historical events, so much so that "the concept of the 'holocaust' was later personified in [...] with the character Holocaust". |
| Isolationist | X-Factor #89 (February 1993) | Josef Huber is a villain with power mimicry. |
| Krakoa | Giant-Size X-Men #1 (May 1975) | A living island that was alleged to have been mutated by radiation. During the Krakoan Age, Krakoa is established as a mutant nation and is revealed to have existed long before its supposed birth, having been half of the ancient mutant island Okkara until she was split in two. |
| Lady Mastermind | X-Treme X-Men #6 (December 2001) | Regan Wyngarde is a mutant with illusion-based powers and the daughter of the original Mastermind. |
| Lorelei | X-Men #63 (December 1969) | Lani Ubanu is a mutate from the Savage Land with a hypnotic voice that can mesmerize male humanoids. While normally associated with the Savage Land, Lorelei has also been a member of Magneto's Brotherhood of Mutants. |
| Mastermind | Wolverine/Gambit: Victims #1 (September 1995) | Martinique Jason is a mutant with illusion-based powers and the daughter of the original Mastermind. |
| Masque | The Uncanny X-Men #169 (May 1983) | A former Morlock with the ability to alter the flesh and organs of living creatures. |
| Master Mold | X-Men #15 (December 1965) | A massive Sentinel with the primary purpose of creating other Sentinels. |
| Mesmero | X-Men #49 (October 1968) | Vincent is a mutant with the ability of hypnosis. |
| Mikhail Rasputin | The Uncanny X-Men #285 (February 1992) | Mikhail Rasputin is a mutant with substance-altering and dimension-hopping abilities. |
| Mimic | X-Men #19 (April 1966) | Calvin Rankin is one of the X-Men's earliest members, and the first character to be added to the X-Men's original roster. Mimic has the mutant ability to copy the powers of those within his radius. |
| Lois London (Mortis) | Dazzler #21 (November 1981) | Lois London is a mutant and sister to Dazzler. During Necrosha, Mortis joined Selene's Inner Circle and helped her resurrect several deceased mutants. |
| Mutina | Uncanny X-Men Vol. 6 #17 (July 2025) | Leiticia Leech is a famous actress who loves to make controversial takes and troll online users. She hates mutants with a twist; she is also a mutant herself. |
| Nanny and Orphan-Maker | X-Factor #30 (July 1988) | Nanny was once a scientist employed by the Right in the field of cyborg technology. A mutant herself, she opposed the Right's plan but was turned into a cyborg. She escaped with a young mutant whom she called Orphan-Maker. Driven insane by their experiences, the duo became a pair of would-be saviors of mutant children, whose parents they murdered. |
| N'astirh | X-Factor #32 (October 1988) | A demon from the realm of Limbo. A former servant of Belasco, N'astirh coveted power and wished to become ruler of Limbo as well as Earth. |
| Nimrod | The Uncanny X-Men #191 (March 1985) | An upgraded, vastly superior Sentinel from the future. |
| Onslaught | X-Men (vol. 2) #53 (June 1996) | An amalgamation of the minds of Charles Xavier and Magneto. |
| Phantazia | X-Force #6 (January 1992) | Eileen Harsaw is a mutant with the ability to disrupt the electromagnetic field of those around her. Toad recruited Phantazia into his Brotherhood of Mutants, realizing how powerful she was. She was later invited to join the Acolytes, but she rejected the offer. Phantazia lost her powers after Decimation. |
| Proteus | The Uncanny X-Men #125 (September 1979) | Kevin MacTaggert is a reality-warping and body-possessing mutant and the son of Moira MacTaggert. He is a member of The Five, a group of mutants whose abilities in tandem resurrect fallen mutants within the island of Krakoa. |
| Sat-Yr-9 | Captain Britain Monthly #3 (1984) | Opul Lun Sat-Yr-9 is a mutant from Earth-794 who has battled Excalibur and Captain Britain on several occasions. |
| Selene | New Mutants #9 (November 1983) | Selene Gallio is a mutant with an array of powers including telepathy and the ability to absorb the lifeforce from other beings. |
| Senator Robert Kelly | The Uncanny X-Men #133 (May 1980) | A prominent United States senator who began his career on an anti-mutant platform and tended to be an antagonist to the X-Men team. But towards the later days of his career, he began to change his views on mutants as a whole. |
| Saturnyne | Marvel Super Heroes #380 (December 1981) | Opal Luna Saturnyne is an Omniversal Majestrix. She is cunning, deceitful and manipulative and she oversaw the battle in X of Swords between the mutants of Krakoa and mutants of Arakko. |
| Shinobi Shaw | X-Factor #67 (June 1991) | Shinobi Shaw was a mutant with the power to alter his body's density from diamond-hard to intangible. The son of Sebastian Shaw of the Hellfire Club, Shinobi killed his father and took over the role as Black King while also working with the Upstarts, a group of individuals competing to score points by killing mutants. After a number of deaths, Shinobi was resurrected by the X-Men on the mutant island Krakoa and recruited into the Hellfire Trading Company by his father. |
| Siena Blaze | The Uncanny X-Men Annual #17 (June 1993) | Siena Blaze was a mutant with the ability to fire destructive blasts of electromagnetic energy. When she used her powers, she risked destroying the Earth. During her first outing, Blaze nearly killed the three leaders of the X-Men in Antarctica. |
| Stryfe | New Mutants #86 (February 1990) | A clone of Cable and major adversary of X-Force. From the same future timeline as Cable, Stryfe traveled to the past and formed the Mutant Liberation Front, a terrorist group. He was also primarily responsible for the release of the Legacy Virus, a fatal disease for mutantkind. |
| Sugar Man | Generation Next #2 (April 1995) | A twisted, evil mutant from the Age of Apocalypse dimension. |
| Sublime | New X-Men Annual 2001 | Sublime, also known as John Sublime, is a sentient bacterial lifeform. |
| S'ym | The Uncanny X-Men #160 (August 1982) | A demon from the realm of Limbo. |
| Tarn the Uncaring | Hellions #6 (November 2020) | Tarn the Uncaring is a mutant/daemon hybrid who has the ability to manipulate mutant genes. He is a part of the Great Ring of Arakko and Locus Vile. |
| Trevor Fitzroy | The Uncanny X-Men #281 (October 1991) | Trevor Fitzroy is a time-traveling mutant with the ability to absorb life force via touch. For many years, Fitzroy served with the Upstarts. |
| Unus the Untouchable | X-Men #8 (November 1964) | Gunther Bain is a mutant with the ability to generate an invisible psionic field around himself. One of the X-Men's earliest foes, Unus joined a variation of Magneto's original Brotherhood of Mutants. Over the years, Unus was killed in action and later returned, but lost his powers after Decimation. Despite this, he appeared with his powers intact. |
| Vanisher | X-Men #2 (November 1963) | Telford Porter was a mutant with the power of teleportation. One of the X-Men's earliest foes, Vanisher had been a member of the Brotherhood of Mutants, Factor Three, Marauders, and Hellfire Club. He later joined X-Force. |
| Vargas | X-Treme X-Men #1 (July 2001) | A superhuman being who considered himself to be "homo superior superior." Vargas was killed by Harpoon of the Marauders while in possession of a piece of Destiny's diaries. |
| Vertigo | Marvel Fanfare #1 (March 1982) | A mutate from the Savage Land with the ability to disrupt the equilibrium of living creatures. A clone of Vertigo was later recruited into the Marauders by Mister Sinister. |
| Vulcan | X-Men: Deadly Genesis #1 (January 2006) | Gabriel Summers is a mutant with the ability to psionically manipulate, control, and absorb vast amounts of energy. Vulcan is the younger brother of Cyclops and Havok. |
| Wendigo | The Incredible Hulk (vol. 2) #162 (April 1973) | A monstrous race created by a curse that infects and spreads to other individuals. |
| X-Cutioner | The Uncanny X-Men Annual #17 (June 1993) | Carl Denti is a former FBI agent obsessed with stalking mutants who kill humans. |
| Zaladane | Astonishing Tales #3 (December 1970) | Zaladane is a sorceress and possible mutate, most often associated with the Savage Land. While initially a priestess of Garokk, Zaladane later assisted the High Evolutionary and then afterward assumed the role of Empress of the Savage Land. Zaladane was killed by Magneto against the protests of Rogue and Nick Fury. |

== Teams ==
| Villain | First appearance | Description |
|---|---|---|
| 3K | X-Men (Vol. 7) #1 (2024) | A group of supremacists founded after the fall of Krakoa. Claiming to be the "true heirs of Krakoa", they seeks to have mutants overtake humanity by the year 3000, hence their name. |
| 3K X-Men | X-Men (Vol. 7) #1 (2024) | 3K's version of the X-Men. Its members are former Orchis members who were given mutant powers and trained by Wyre. |
| Acolytes | X-Men (vol. 2) #1 (1991) | A group of mutant fanatics who believe that mutants are destined to conquer and destroy normal humanity. The Acolytes were loyal and completely devoted to Magneto, who they believed to be the mutant messiah. |
| Alliance of Evil | X-Factor #5 (June 1986) | A band of mutant mercenaries who have been hired by Apocalypse, Advanced Idea Mechanics, and other criminals. |
| Brotherhood of Mutants | X-Men #4 (March 1964) | A team of mutants founded by Magneto to serve as the antithesis to the X-Men. The team has had many incarnations over the years, with Mystique, Toad, Exodus, Mesmero, and others leading their own versions. |
| Children of the Vault | X-Men (vol. 2) #188 (September 2006) | A group of superhuman beings that have evolved from a baseline human genome over 6,000 years. Prominent members include Serafina, Perro, Aguja, Fuego, and Sangre. |
| Church of Humanity | The Uncanny X-Men #399 (December 2001) | An anti-mutant Christian-based religious sect/hate group. |
| Clan Akkaba | Rise of Apocalypse #1 (October 1996) | The descendants of Apocalypse. They first appeared in Apocalypse vs Dracula #1. |
| Damocles Foundation | X-Force #79 (May 1998) | An organization composed of Eternals, Deviant, and humans, who aimed to end conflicts between warring races by creating a supreme race of superhumans. Members included their leader Odysseus Indigo, Arcadia DeVille, and Segismund Joshua. |
| Dark Descendants | The Uncanny X-Men #335 (August 1996) | A group of mutant worshipers of Onslaught led by Dark Beast. Members included Havok, Fatale, Post, Holocaust, and Random. |
| Dark Riders | X-Factor #65 (April 1991) | Also known as the Riders of the Storm, the Dark Riders are servants of Apocalypse devoted to the philosophy of the survival of the fittest. The first incarnation was composed primarily of Inhumans, though when Genesis took over as leader of the second incarnation, many mutants were added to the roster. |
| Genoshan Magistrates | Uncanny X-Men #235 (June, 1988) | The resident police force of Genosha, responsible for maintaining power over imprisoned mutants. Notable members include David Moreau, and the Press Gang. |
| Externals | X-Force #10 (May 1992) | A group of a rare, immortal subspecies of mutants. Prominent members include Candra, Gideon, Absalom, Crule, and Selene. Apocalypse was later revealed to be an External. |
| Horsemen of Apocalypse | X-Factor #15 (April 1987) | A group of four individuals (typically mutants) that have been genetically altered and mentally conditioned to serve the immortal mutant Apocalypse. The first modern incarnation included Warren Worthington III as Death, Autumn Rolfson as Famine, Abraham Kieros as War, and Plague as Pestilence. However, Apocalypse has had several incarnations of the Horsemen over the years. |
| Foursaken and the First Fallen | Uncanny X-Men #473 (May 2006) | The First Fallen is a cosmic force resembling an angel, that sought to preserve the universe by freezing it in time. It chose four members of each race (known as the Foursaken) to live in an isolated city of its creation. A group of humans including Jamie Braddock, Ned Horrocks, Godfrey Calthrop, and Amina Synge, were chosen by the First Fallen for this purpose. |
| Freedom Force | The Uncanny X-Men #199 (November 1985) | A team of federal agents which was established as a superhero team directly accountable to the US government. The team was formed by former members of the Brotherhood of Mutants's second incarnation, but almost immediately began taking on new recruits, including Spiral, Spider-Woman, Stonewall, Crimson Commando, and Super Sabre. |
| Friends of Humanity | The Uncanny X-Men #299 (April 1993) | A human-supremacist hate group formed by Graydon Creed. |
| Gene Nation | The Uncanny X-Men #323 (August 1995) | An offshoot of the Morlocks who blame the X-Men for their plight. |
| Hell's Belles | X-Factor #80 (July 1992) | A group of female mercenaries led by Cyber. The Hell's Belles functioned as extortionists for high-paying drug cartels. Their membership included fire-breathing Flambé, scorching hot Briquette, invisible Vague, and the sonic wave-projecting Tremolo. The second incarnation of X-Factor was hired to protect former Belle Shrew from the group's attempts at revenge. All of the Belles except for Briquette were depowered after Decimation. The depowered Belles were eventually invited to join Krakoa and potentially have their powers restored through the Crucible. |
| Hellfire Club | The Uncanny X-Men #129 (January 1980) | Due to the long-standing and secretive nature of the organization, not all of its members are known. The listed members are all part of the Inner Circle, also known as the Lords Cardinal. The non-Inner Circle members include many wealthy or politically connected men and women of the Marvel Universe like Tony Stark and Norman Osborn are generally unaware or uninvolved with the club's illegal activities. Prominent members include Emma Frost, Sebastian Shaw, Donald Pierce, Harry Leland, Selene, Shinobi Shaw, Friedrich von Roehm, and Sage (then known as Tessa). |
| Hellions | New Mutants #16 (June 1984) | Young counterparts to the New Mutants, under Emma Frost's tutelage. Prominent members include Empath, Tarot, Catseye, Jetstream, Roulette and Thunderbird. During Dawn of X, the Hellions team name is used by the X-Men, with a lineup including Mister Sinister, Psylocke, Scalphunter, Havok, Empath, Nanny, Orphan-Maker, and Wild Child. |
| Heritage Initiative | X-Men Gold (vol. 2) #1 (April 2017) | An anti-mutant organization focused on harvesting the X-Gene. Its prominent members are its director Lydia Nance and Edwin Martynec. The organization is a subsidiary of Orchis. |
| Homines Verendi | Marauders #4 (December 2019) | Anti-mutant organization led by the children who once commandeered the Hellfire Club: Kade Kilgore, Manuel Enduque, Wilhelmina Kensington, and Maximilian Frankenstein. |
| Hordeculture | X-Men (vol. 5) #3 (February 2020) | A group of elderly human scientists "who specialize in the genetic manipulation of – and propagation of – all things botanical." Membership includes Augusta Bromes, Edith Scutch, Opal Vetiver, and Lily Leymus. Former member includes Harrower. |
| Marauders | The Uncanny X-Men #210 (October 1986) | A group of mutant mercenaries recruited by Mister Sinister to serve as his strike force. Each Marauder's DNA has been stored by Sinister so that in the event of their deaths, he may clone them at a moment's notice. Each Marauder retains the memories of the clone who died before them. Prominent members include Scalphunter, Arclight, Riptide, Vertigo, Prism, Harpoon, Malice, Sabretooth, and Gambit. During Dawn of X, the Marauders team name is used by Kitty Pryde's X-Men team consisting of Storm, Iceman, Bishop, Pyro, and Emma Frost. |
| Morlocks | The Uncanny X-Men #169 (May 1983) | An underground society of mutant outcasts living in the sewers and abandoned tunnels beneath New York City, composed of mutant misfits, especially those with physical mutations or other conspicuous manifestations of their mutant genetics who were unable to pass as human in everyday society. Prominent members include Callisto, Caliban, Masque, Sunder, Annalee, Beautiful Dreamer, Erg, and Marrow. |
| Mutant Liberation Front | New Mutants #86 (February 1990) | Mutant terrorists organized by Stryfe, captured by members of Operation: Zero Tolerance. Prominent members include Reaper, Wildside, Rusty Collins, Dragoness, Forearm, Thumbelina, Zero, Tempo, and Reignfire. |
| Nasty Boys | X-Factor #75 (February 1992) | A gang of mutant thugs who work for Mister Sinister. Prominent members include Ruckus, Hairbag, Gorgeous George, Ramrod, and Slab. |
| Neo | X-Men (vol. 2) #99 (April 2000) | An offshoot of the mutant genome that lived in seclusion from the rest of the world. |
| Orchis | House of X #1 (September 2019) | Orchis is a secretive anti-mutant organization composed of former members of Advanced Idea Mechanics, Hydra, S.H.I.E.L.D., A.R.M.O.R., and Alpha Flight. |
| Purifiers | Marvel Graphic Novel #5 (January 1985) | A team created by William Stryker to rid the world of mutantkind. |
| Reavers | The Uncanny X-Men #229 (May 1988) | A team of cyborgs led by Lady Deathstrike and Donald Pierce. The Reavers were originally created by Spiral, transforming the mortally wounded Hellfire Club mercenaries Reese, Cole, and Macon into cyborgs to save their lives. When Donald Pierce joined the team, he brought with him Skullbuster, Pretty Boy, and Bonebreaker. Cylla Markham later joined the group to replace Skullbuster after his death. |
| Rising Sons | Generation X #53 (May 1999) | A team of adolescent Madripoor-based mercenaries composed of mutants, cyborgs and magic-users led by Dragonwing and including his sister, Spoilsport, along with The Sign, Jet-Black, Tough Love and Nightwind. |
| Sapien League | Decimation: House of M - The Day After #1 (November, 2005) | A team of human supremacists that emerged after M-Day. They were led by the Leper Queen, and are later recruited into Bastion's Purifiers. |
| Savage Land Mutates | X-Men #62 (November 1969) | Primitive humans genetically altered by Magneto. When Magneto abandoned the Savage Land, the mutates were led by Sauron. The Sun Priestess Zaladane later took over as Empress of the Savage Land until her demise. The mutates eventually turned on Sauron, who had returned to lead, instead opting for a shared leadership between Lupa, Vertigo, and Whiteout. Other prominent members include Amphibius, Lupo, Barbarus, Sauron, Lorelei, and Brainchild. |
| Sentinels | X-Men #14 (November 1965) | Technologically advanced mutant-hunting robots created by Bolivar Trask |
| Swordbearers of Arakko | X-Men (vol. 5) #12 (November 2020) | A group of mutant inhabitants of Arakko, Krakoa's sister entity, who have each been given a mythical sword to compete in the X of Swords tournament. |
| Upstarts | The Uncanny X-Men #281 (October 1981) | Amoral thrill-seekers who wager on the life and death of others. Prominent members include Gamesmaster, Shinobi Shaw, Trevor Fitzroy, Siena Blaze, Graydon Creed, Fenris, and Selene. |
| Weapon P.R.I.M.E. | X-Force #10 (May 1992) | An off-shoot of the Weapon X program led by Garrison Kane. A second version of Weapon P.R.I.M.E. later appeared, this time led by Tigerstryke. Weapon P.R.I.M.E. briefly battled X-Force and later attempted to hunt down Northstar. |
| XENO | X-Force (vol. 6) #1 (November 2019) | XENO is an extreme anti mutant organization based out of Seoul, South Korea. Its leader is the Man with the Peacock Tattoo. |
| U-Men | New X-Men 2001 #1 (August 2001) | U-Men are a group of humans that harvest mutant body parts to augment their own bodies with superhuman abilities. They are led by Sublime. |

== See also ==
- List of X-Men members
