= X of Swords =

Marvel Comics storyline

- Publisher: Marvel Comics
- Publication date: September – November 2020
- Genre: Superhero
- Main character(s): X-Men; Apocalypse; Saturnyne; The First Horsemen; Swordbearers of Arakko

Creative team
- Writer(s): Vita Ayala; Ed Brisson; Gerry Duggan; Jonathan Hickman; Tini Howard; Benjamin Percy; Zeb Wells; Leah Williams
- Artist(s): Mahmud Asrar; Viktor Bogdanovic; Joshua Cassara; Carmen Carnero; Stefano Caselli; Leinil Francis Yu; Carlos Gomez; Pepe Larraz; Matteo Lolli; Phil Noto; Rod Reis; R. B. Silva; Marcus To
- X of Swords: ISBN 978-1302927172

"X of Swords" (pronounced "Ten of Swords") is a comic book crossover story arc set during the larger "Krakoan Age" storyline, which debuted in September 2020, published by Marvel Comics. It was part of Marvel's "Dawn of X" relaunch of its X-Men books, following the "House of X" and "Powers of X" storylines. "X of Swords" was followed by the 2021 "Hellfire Gala" storyline.

== Publication history ==
"X of Swords" (September – November 2020) was the first crossover of the Krakoan Age since the relaunch House of X and Powers of X event it concluded the Dawn of X publishing initiative and launched the Reign of X publishing initiative. As with Powers of X, "the 'X' in the title is meant to be read as 'Ten'". It was initially teased in Free Comic Book Day 2020: X-Men #1 before being announced at C2E2 in February 2020 as the upcoming 15-part X-Men summer crossover storyline. The title is a "reference to the Ten of Swords", a tarot card that "generally represents betrayal, rivalry and tragic endings".

Banshee, Glob Herman, and Trinary were set to have roles in X of Swords storyline as teased in Free Comic Book Day 2020: X-Men #1 but Banshee was replaced with his daughter Siryn, Glob Herman with Rockslide and Trinary was removed entirely. Regarding this, then-X-Men line's editor Jordan White revealed that Free Comic Book Day comics are done early and stories could change when revised, so they had meant to change the story and not the characters.

Entertainment Weekly highlighted that "as with so many 2020 comics, X of Swords was hit by big pandemic delays"; the crossover was "a collaboration between more than 28 creators" and "the fact that the creative team was stretched across the globe meant they were all affected by COVID-19 in different ways". On the impact of the pandemic, Excalibur and X-Corp writer Tini Howard commented,

I don't know if it would have been the same book on the original schedule because tinkering with the schedule caused problems, but also enabled us to do certain things. Everything about that book is very much a product of the situation and people functioning under specific conditions probably more than any other comic I've been a part of. [...] We were all working together on it so much, partially because we didn't have anywhere else to go in lockdown. So we were kind of losing our minds together and making this book. In a way I think it saved my year.

The groundwork for the storyline was established during Howard's Excalibur run. In June 2020, it was revealed that the crossover had increased to 24 issues – two prelude issues followed by a 22-part story. Screen Rant commented that in this style of crossover "creative teams work together, with normal stories suspended in favor of continuing the event". X of Swords: Creation #1, by writers Jonathan Hickman and Tini Howard with art by Pepe Larraz and Marte Gracia, was released in September 2020. The final issue, X of Swords: Destruction #1 by the same creative team, was released in November 2020. A 56-page companion guidebook, X of Swords Handbook, in an encyclopedic style was released alongside the crossover; "each entry features multiple paragraphs detailing each character's known history up until this event".

== Plot ==
=== Main story ===
==== The Invading Army ====
It is revealed that the first incarnation of the Horsemen of Apocalypse are the children of Apocalypse and Genesis. In the present day, Apocalypse uses the portal to Otherworld to return to Arakko. However, what Apocalypse did not expect was that this was an elaborate plan created by the Horsemen to overthrow Krakoa. Apocalypse is attacked and critically injured by his daughter War, forcing him to retreat to Krakoa.

==== Failure of the Resurrection Protocols ====
Rockslide suffers a surprise attack by Summoner, who destroys his psychic essence. Hurrying back to Krakoa, the Five restore Rockslide's physical husk. Professor X tries to download Rockslide's memories, but the five Cerebro mainframes fry and short circuit. Apprehensive, the Five convene with the Quiet Council of Krakoa to inform them that Rockslide being killed in Otherworld has interfered with the resurrection process. When the Five attempt to resurrect Rockslide, they create an amalgam of Rockslide's alternate universe counterparts who is later dubbed Wrongslide.

==== The Gathering of Swords ====
Polaris acts as a medium for Saturnyne and delivers the list of swords and cryptic hints about the chosen champions of Krakoa who will fight against champions of Arakko. Wolverine and Arakkii mutant Solem are sent to a Hell-like dimension to reach legendary bladesmith Muramasa, and ask him to forge new blades for the tournament. Solem gets both of the new Muramasa swords, but yields one to Logan in exchange for a favor. Storm travels to Wakanda to request permission to borrow an ancient relic from the Royal Family: a mystical sword named Skybreaker, made of vibranium and previously wielded by a legendary Wakandan king. Due to the Royal Family's refusal, Ororo is forced to steal it only to face her ex-sister in-law Shuri, before leaving the country.

Cypher shares his worries with Warlock and Krakoa while training under Magik for the upcoming tournament. Meanwhile, the Quiet Council decides to take a different approach instead of sending a mutant with little battle experience: they secretly agree to send Mister Sinister and his Hellions to sabotage the contest. Cable, Jean Grey, and Cyclops travel to the S.W.O.R.D. space station and Cable activates it with his sword, the Light of Galador. The trio soon discovers that an extradimensional army known as the Vescora massacred the station's occupants. After dealing with this threat, Cable joins the other swordbearers. In Otherworld, Betsy Braddock (Captain Britain) and Brian Braddock trick Saturnyne into forging the Starlight Sword, while also acquiring the Sword of Might.

Still reeling from the betrayal of his children, Apocalyse reminisces about the time he lost his wife Genesis and children, the First Horsemen, when Okkara was split into two islands. Soon after, he asks Gorgon to accompany him to Egypt to retrieve his own sword (a khopesh) for the tournament. In Arakko, the First Horsemen assemble their forces for the upcoming tournament, all the while revealing underlying tensions among themselves and between a few of the major players of Krakoa's side.

==== Accommodation in Otherworld ====
After the chosen Swordbearers of Arakko and Krakoa travel to Otherworld, they are welcomed by Saturnyne. Both parties intermingle and try to discover each other's secrets and weaknesses. Apocalypse encounters his former wife Genesis, who reveals the story of her banishment while Storm shares a dance with the Horseman of Death.

==== The Tournament Begins ====
After the feast, Saturnyne announces the challenges. Aside from one-on-one battles, she forces the Swordbearers to compete in a series of extravagant contests.

Notable contests include: the apparent death of Captain Britain against Isca the Unbeaten, shattering into glass-like fragments; the marriage of Cypher and Bei the Blood Moon; and Gorgon being killed after a fierce battle against White Sword and his champions. Finally, with the score tied, Saturnyne announces the last match: Apocalyse versus Genesis possessed by Annihilation.

In the meantime, Sinister and the Hellions arrive in Amenth to sabotage the Arakkii team, but their mission goes awry when they encounter Tarn the Uncaring and the Locus Vile. Theirs is a bloody battle, and four of their number (including Sinister, secretly a clone) are killed. The other Hellions barely escape through a portal to Krakoa, but as soon as they return, the real Sinister kills the survivors to keep his true purpose during the mission a secret: stealing gene samples from Arakkii mutants.

==== All-Out War ====
Before his duel with Bei, Cable telepathically communicates with Jean Grey and Cyclops on Krakoa. Saturnyne notices the interference and cuts their contact. Fearing for Cable's life, the heroes present their case to the Quiet Council: they intend to take as many mutants to the Otherworld and rescue Krakoa's champions. They also feel the need to reinstate the X-Men as a permanent team to defend their interests.

When Apocalypse wins the duel against Genesis, Annihilation seizes full control of its host and summons Daemons to invade Krakoa. Cable uses S.W.O.R.D.'s space station to transport everyone they can gather to Otherworld's battlefield (including a reborn Captain Britain Corps), in the middle of an all-out war between Krakoa's and Amenth's armies. During the battle, Apocalypse manages to take the Annihilation Helm from Genesis and, overcoming its corrupting influence, makes Amenth's forces surrender. Saturnyne, satisfied with this conclusion, asks both Krakoa and Arakko to trade prisoners as a token of good will. Apocalypse accompanies his wife and children back to Amenth in exchange for Arakko returning to Earth, so Krakoa can reunite with its "twin" at last.

Saturnyne is crowned Queen in Otherworld and gets what she needed, but not what she wanted: Brian Braddock's heart.

=== Aftermath ===
The conclusion of X of Swords saw the X-Men comics line transition from the Dawn of X era to the Reign of X era, which involved the launch of new titles and Vita Ayala taking over writing duties on New Mutants.

With Apocalypse leaving Krakoa to be with his wife and children in Amenth, and Jean Grey stepping down from her leadership position to form the X-Men, the Quiet Council has two empty seats. The remaining members now try to pick names to fill the void.

In X-Men, with Cyclops and Jean Grey having decided to work outside the Quiet Council and take a strike team to rescue the Champions in Otherworld, the pair begin work on forming Krakoa's first official X-Men team.

In S.W.O.R.D. by Al Ewing, the Krakoans take hold of the S.W.O.R.D space station and reposition it as their satellite base, under the command of Agent Abigail Brand.

In Excalibur, Saturnyne rebuilds the Captain Britain Corps with alternate reality counterparts of Elizabeth Braddock. The original Betsy, however, remains missing after her battle with Isca the Unbeaten, leaving the Excalibur team on a desperate search to find her.

== Characters involved ==
Krakoa
- Apocalypse
- Archangel
- Banshee
- Beast
- Black King
- Cable
- Captain Britain
- Cecilia Reyes
- Cyclops
- Cypher
- Egg
- Elixir
- Empath
- Exodus
- Gambit
- Gorgon
- Greycrow
- Havok
- Healer
- Hope Summers
- Jubilee
- Krakoa
- Magik
- Magneto
- Marvel Girl
- Mister Sinister
- Mondo
- Mystique
- Nanny
- Nightcrawler
- Orphan-Maker
- Penance
- Polaris
- Prestige
- Professor X
- Proteus
- Psylocke
- Red Queen
- Rictor
- Rockslide
- Rogue
- Shogo Lee
- Silver Samurai
- Siryn
- Storm
- Tempus
- Warlock
- White Queen
- Wild Child
- Wolverine
Arakko
- Annihilation
- Bei the Blood Moon
- Death
- Famine
- Genesis
- Isca the Unbeaten
- Pestilence
- Pogg Ur-Pogg
- Redroot the Forest
- Solem
- Summoner
- Tarn the Uncaring
- War
- White Sword
Otherworld
- Captain Avalon
- Mad Jim Jaspers
- Merlin
- Monarch
- Quaddeus Quo
- Roma
- Ryl
- Saturnyne
Other
- Black Panther
- Muramasa
- Ramonda
- Shuri

== Issues involved ==
=== Prelude issues ===
Issue	Release date	Writer	Artist	Colorist	Comic Book Roundup rating	Estimated sales to North American retailers (first month)
Excalibur (vol. 4) #12	September 16, 2020	Tini Howard	Marcus To	Erick Arciniega	8.1 from 7 professional critics	29,500–35,000
X-Men (vol. 5) #12	September 16, 2020	Jonathan Hickman	Leinil Francis Yu	Sunny Gho	8.2 from 10 professional critics	75,000–90,000

=== Main issues ===
Chapter	Issue	Release date	Writer(s)	Artist(s)	Colorist	Comic Book Roundup rating	Estimated sales to North American retailers (first month)
1	X of Swords: Creation #1	September 23, 2020	Jonathan Hickman; Tini Howard	Pepe Larraz	Marte Gracia	8.4 from 18 professional critics	115,000–140,000
2	X-Factor (vol. 4) #4	September 30, 2020	Leah Williams	Carlos Gomez	Israel Silva	8.4 from 8 professional critics	50,000–60,000
3	Wolverine (vol. 7) #6	October 7, 2020	Benjamin Percy	Viktor Bogdanovic	Matt Wilson	7.8 from 11 professional critics	85,000–95,000
4	X-Force (vol. 6) #13	October 7, 2020	Benjamin Percy	Viktor Bogdanovic	Matt Wilson	7.7 from 11 professional critics	48,000–53,000
5	Marauders #13	October 7, 2020	Vita Ayala	Matteo Lolli	Edgar Delgado	8.0 from 10 professional critics	46,000–51,000
6	Hellions #5	October 14, 2020	Zeb Wells	Carmen Carnero	David Curiel	8.2 from 10 professional critics	41,500–46,000
7	New Mutants (vol. 4) #13	October 14, 2020	Ed Brisson	Rod Reis		8.5 from 8 professional critics	45,000–50,000
8	Cable (vol. 4) #5	October 14, 2020	Gerry Duggan	Phil Noto		8.1 from 8 professional critics	32,500–36,000
9	Excalibur (vol. 4) #13	October 21, 2020	Tini Howard	R. B. Silva	Nolan Woodard	7.7 from 8 professional critics	42,000–47,000
10	X-Men (vol. 5) #13	October 21, 2020	Jonathan Hickman	Mahmud Asrar	Sunny Gho	7.8 from 12 professional critics	90,000–100,000
11	X of Swords: Stasis #1	October 28, 2020	Tini Howard; Jonathan Hickman	Pepe Larraz; Mahmud Asrar	Marte Gracia	7.5 from 13 professional critics	61,500–68,000
12	X-Men (vol. 5) #14	November 4, 2020	Jonathan Hickman	Mahmud Asrar; Leinil Francis Yu	Sunny Gho	7.5 from 9 professional critics	Not yet available
13	Marauders #14	November 4, 2020	Gerry Duggan; Benjamin Percy	Stefano Caselli	Edgar Delgado	7.5 from 8 professional critics	Not yet available
14	Marauders #15	November 11, 2020	Gerry Duggan; Benjamin Percy	Stefano Caselli	Edgar Delgado	7.6 from 8 professional critics	Not yet available
15	Excalibur (vol. 4) #14	November 11, 2020	Tini Howard	Phil Noto		7.3 from 11 professional critics	Not yet available
16	Wolverine (vol. 7) #7	November 11, 2020	Benjamin Percy; Gerry Duggan	Joshua Cassara	Guru-eFX	7.9 from 10 professional critics	Not yet available
17	X-Force (vol. 6) #14	November 18, 2020	Benjamin Percy; Gerry Duggan	Joshua Cassara	Guru-eFX	7.5 from 11 professional critics	Not yet available
18	Hellions #6	November 18, 2020	Zeb Wells	Carmen Carnero	David Curiel	7.7 from 9 professional critics	Not yet available
19	Cable (vol. 4) #6	November 18, 2020	Gerry Duggan	Phil Noto		8.0 from 9 professional critics	Not yet available
20	X-Men (vol. 5) #15	November 25, 2020	Jonathan Hickman	Mahmud Asrar	Sunny Gho	8.2 from 11 professional critics	Not yet available
21	Excalibur (vol. 4) #15	November 25, 2020	Tini Howard	Mahmud Asrar; Stefano Caselli	Sunny Gho; Rachelle Rosenberg	7.7 from 7 professional critics	Not yet available
22	X of Swords: Destruction #1	November 25, 2020	Jonathan Hickman; Tini Howard	Pepe Larraz	Marte Gracia	7.8 from 15 professional critics	Not yet available

=== Other ===
Title	Release date
X of Swords Handbook #1	October 14, 2020

=== Collected editions ===
Title	Material collected	Format	Publication date	ISBN
X of Swords	X of Swords: Creation #1, X of Swords: Stasis #1, X of Swords: Destruction #1, X-Men (vol. 5) #12-15, Excalibur (vol. 4) #13-15, Marauders (vol. 1) #13-15, X-Force (vol. 6) #13-14, New Mutants (vol. 4) #13, Wolverine (vol. 7) #6-7, Cable (vol. 4) #5-6, Hellions (vol. 1) #5-6, X-Factor (vol. 4) #4	Hardcover	January 19, 2021	ISBN 978-1302927172
X of Swords vol. 1	X of Swords: Creation #1, X of Swords: Stasis #1, X of Swords: Destruction #1, X-Men (vol. 5) #12-15, Excalibur (vol. 4) #13-15, Marauders (vol. 1) #13-15, X-Force (vol. 6) #13-14, New Mutants (vol. 4) #13, Wolverine (vol. 7) #6-7, Cable (vol. 4) #5-6, Hellions (vol. 1) #5-6, X-Factor (vol. 4) #4	Trade paperback	June 1, 2021	ISBN 978-1846532917
X of Swords	X of Swords: Creation #1, X of Swords: Stasis #1, X of Swords: Destruction #1, X-Men (vol. 5) #12-15, Excalibur (vol. 4) #13-15, Marauders (vol. 1) #13-15, X-Force (vol. 6) #13-14, New Mutants (vol. 4) #13, Wolverine (vol. 7) #6-7, Cable (vol. 4) #5-6, Hellions (vol. 1) #5-6, X-Factor (vol. 4) #4	Trade paperback	January 11, 2022	ISBN 978-1302929978

== Critical reception ==
Susana Polo of Polygon highlighted the risk this crossover took in its structure by eschewing the main miniseries with tie-ins format and instead doing "something we see way less often" by telling a story through existing series – "it all felt like a single contiguous narrative, no need for a narration box to pop through the fourth wall to tell you that you should only read this tie-in issue if you've already read Spider-Man #42069 or what have you". Polo thought a "downside" was that "readers had to buy a lot more books" in a two month span, however, it was a rewarding crossover to read. She commented "If the creative teams had not kept such a high polish on the art, stakes, character forward storytelling, and making sure X of Swords felt like one story and not a clumsy game of Exquisite Corpse, this could have been very different. This format might be harder to pull off than the usual event comic structure, it might require a lot more heft on the part of writers, artists, and editors, but it sure made a damn enjoyable comic". Jim Dandeneau, for Den of Geek, highlighted that the X of Swords "setup promised what was essentially a season of Dragon Ball Super in an X-Men comic", however, "once the tournament started, it ended up being the fighting equivalent of Whose Line Is It Anyway – the rules were made up and the points didn't matter. [...] When it came down to it, X of Swords was an Excalibur story, and it honored that book's roots by being multiversal, very silly, and full of effective character growth. And very, very good".

Alex Abad-Santos of Vox thought the crossover, with its "dependence on House of X and its robust roster of characters and mythology", was a story "that's way too big to serve as a starting point" – "X of Swords is the reward for sticking with the X-Men through a tumultuous era, and it hurtles their story forward with real consequence and thrill". Abad-Santos commented that "as is Hickman's MO, X of Swords veers toward complex, sometimes impenetrable fantasy. [...] X of Swords introduces a sprawling maze of rules and bylaws and lore that would be difficult to explain to someone who hasn't cracked the book. At the same time, it kicks off the kind of story you immediately want to share with your friends because you need someone to talk to about what you just read". Oliver Sava, for The A.V. Club, didn't view the crossover as "perfect", commenting that "the mythologizing of Arakko gets repetitive, especially when one of the issues (X-Men #14) reuses artwork from a previous chapter, pairing it with a new script showing a different perspective of the same events. There are going to be plenty of readers annoyed at the fight fake-outs, and you can't blame them when that's what the promotional materials promised". Sava thought it succeeded as a crossover by "letting individual series hold on to their unique voices while still telling a cohesive story. [...] The Krakoa experiment isn't losing any steam, and the confidence and excitement of this crossover suggests that the best is still to come as seeds take root and the X-Men's world continues to grow". Kofi Outlaw of ComicBook.com similarly highlighted that some readers will "feel the world-building is a bait-and-switch on the big battle event that X of Swords promised" as the crossover "invested a lot of time, panels, and chart work to establish the larger layout of Otherworld, its various kingdoms, various species, and their socio-political order". He commented that "the first half of X of Swords seemed like every fantasy-genre epic or Game of Thrones season, with major characters out questing to obtain some all-important MacGuffins" and the switch in the second half to a tournament "has been a smorgasbord of fantasy-genre tropes, that are often hilariously fun in an X-Men setting. [...] It's absurd in the best kind of way - especially if you're a longtime fantasy fan". Outlaw opined that the real test of the crossover was if the Arakko and Otherworld story building have an impact "on the larger X-Men mythos" going forwards.

Ben Morin, for AIPT in 2022, called the crossover a "fine event" which "works well at paying off several through-lines for the era, while also ushering in new status quo changes. Though the expansive worldbuilding does eventually get in the way of the story, it's still impressive, especially with how it all culminates in the final issues. The writing quality varies across the titles, but the art is consistently great". In reviewing the collected trade paperback edition, Morin thought it was a cost effective way to read the crossover with the "omission of the Excalibur #12 prelude issue" as the "only disappointing aspect"; he highlighted that "the collection does also utilize a neat design layout to structure the books with graphics denoting each issue, which also blends really well with the infographic pages". In 2024, D. Emerson Eddy of The Beat viewed X of Swords as "a capsule of both the micro and macro approaches to storytelling that were inherent across the line. While there is some linear flow from chapter to chapter, each segment is given its own voice and purpose by the various creative teams. [...] Overall, the artwork through the crossover is stunning. Not a weak link to be found" with each artist's style remaining distinct. Although he did feel a reader would be "better informed" by reading the comics leading into the crossover, Eddy thought the various perspectives in the story avoided the common crossover pitfall of disjointed voices since "the story is structured in a way that each shines as its own part of the whole". He commented that "X of Swords is a masterful work that I feel captures the joy and limitless possibility of the early Krakoan era. A fantastic otherworldly adventure that adds an incredible amount of lore, depth, and story possibilities to the world as a whole".
