= Skin (Marvel Comics) =

- Skin as depicted in Generation X #63 (May 2000). Art by Steve Pugh.

Publication information
- Publisher: Marvel Comics
- First appearance: Uncanny X-Men #317 (October 1994)
- Created by: Scott Lobdell (writer); Joe Madureira (artist)

In-story information
- Alter ego: Angelo Espinosa
- Species: Human mutant
- Team affiliations: Generation X X-Men
- Abilities: Six feet of extra, malleable skin which can be stretched or reshaped at will

Skin (Angelo Espinosa) is a fictional character (a human mutant) appearing in American comic books published by Marvel Comics. The character first appeared in The Uncanny X-Men #317 (October 1994).

== Publication history ==
Skin was created by writer Scott Lobdell and artist Joe Madureira and first appeared in Uncanny X-Men #317 (October 1994). The issue was part of the storyline "Phalanx Covenant" and saw him kidnapped along with other young mutants. Skin went on to appear as a main character in the series Generation X (1994-2001). Skin was later killed off in Uncanny X-Men #423 (2003), where he was killed by the Church of Humanity. The character was resurrected in the 2019 series House of X, which began the Krakoan Age.

== Fictional character biography ==
Angelo Espinosa is a former gang member from the east Los Angeles area who faked his own death for numerous reasons; to make sure that his friend Tores was not blamed for murder, to hide his newly manifested mutation from his family, and to leave that part of his life behind. Skin is one of four young mutants (including M, Husk, and Blink) abducted by the Phalanx, a techno-organic alien species who intended to uncover the secret behind their inability to assimilate mutants into their collective. Through their combined efforts and those of Banshee, Emma Frost, Sabretooth, Synch, and Jubilee, the four manage to escape their confines. However, Blink sacrifices herself by using her powers to destroy the Phalanx who had captured them.

Skin accepts an invitation to enroll in the Massachusetts Academy, a school for mutants that is owned by Emma Frost. As a member of Generation X, Skin is joined by Synch, Jubilee, Husk, and M (and later by Chamber, Penance, and Mondo). During his stay at the Massachusetts Academy, Skin becomes close friends with Chamber because neither can pass for normal humans in public, and playfully flirts with Husk, Jubilee (whom he nicknames Jubecita), and M. Skin is also hunted by the mutant-killing vigilante X-Cutioner, who believes him to be responsible for the death of Angelo Espinosa and is unaware that they are the same person. Skin succeeds in defeating the vigilante, but keeps his identity secret.

During Operation: Zero Tolerance, Skin and his teammates are transported to his hometown by Glorian. While searching for Skin's cousin Gil, they are captured by Skin's ex-girlfriend Tores, a gang leader who wants to kill him for making her believe he was dead. However, Prime Sentinels attack both Generation X and her gang, forcing them into a reluctant temporary truce. Skin and Tores act as bait to lead the Sentinels into an ambush, and Gil completes the trap by starting a huge explosion, allowing Generation X to escape.

After the Academy closes due to the machinations of Adrienne Frost, Skin returns to Los Angeles with Jubilee in tow. Some time later, Skin, Jubilee, Magma, Bedlam, and several other mutants are found crucified by the Church of Humanity, an anti-mutant organization. Archangel uses his healing blood to resurrect Jubilee and Magma, but Bedlam and Skin do not survive.

In Necrosha, Skin is resurrected via the Transmode Virus to serve as part of Selene's army of deceased mutants. Under the control of Selene and Eli Bard, he takes part in attacking the mutant nation of Utopia.

During the Krakoan Age, Skin is resurrected on Krakoa through the Five. Synch, who had also died, is resurrected around the same time as Skin. The Five prioritized resurrecting Skin and Synch because Synch would be able to act as a backup for the Five using his ability to duplicate superpowers. In addition, it is believed that the two would help each other re-adjust. Skin is seen arm in arm with Synch and standing next to Broo at a party following the first meeting of the Quiet Council of Krakoa. He is later approached by Madison Jeffries manifesting himself through the land, who explains to him that he was thrown in the Pit of Exile for trying to create a place for Danger to live, which is deemed a violation of rule three by the Council. He later tells Blob about this, unsure if it really happened. Blob assures him he has seen enough weird things to believe his story and remarks there will going to be a power-vacuum soon and that "it's good to have a brotherhood". He was part of the X-Men based in Cassidy Keep alongside Banshee and Husk thereafter.

== Powers and abilities ==
Skin possesses approximately six feet of extra skin, which he is capable of stretching, deforming, wrapping, expanding, and compressing at will. At one point, Skin learns to manipulate the melanin in his epidermis to appear normal. However, this causes him to have migraines and he soon gives up on the idea of being normal.

== Other versions ==
An alternate universe version of Skin appears in "Age of Apocalypse". This version is a protégé of Colossus and Shadowcat who is later killed by the Core's guards.

== In other media ==
Skin appears in Generation X, portrayed by Agustin Rodriguez. This version possesses a fully elastic body, though using his powers gives him severe pain.
