= Reign of X =

2020 relaunch of X-Men

- The cover of the first trade paperback collection.
- Publisher: Marvel Comics
- Publication date: December 2020 – March 2022
- Genre: Superhero
- Main character(s): Excalibur; Hellions; Marauders; New Mutants; Secret X-Men; S.W.O.R.D. X-Corp; X-Factor; X-Force; X-Men

Creative team
- Writer: Various
- Artist: Various

Reign of X is a 2020 relaunch of the X-Men line of comic books published by Marvel Comics. It is the sequel to the "Dawn of X" publishing initiative and second phase of the Krakoan Age, which culminated in the limited series "Inferno" and was followed by a sequel relaunch named "Destiny of X".

== Publication history ==
Dawn of X concluded with the crossover storylinesX of Swords, which initiated a sequel relaunch titled Reign of X in December 2020. This phase saw the line come together for the Hellfire Gala event, as well as Jonathan Hickman's departure from the line with the miniseries Inferno. "Reign of X" concluded with the twin event series X Lives of Wolverine and X Deaths of Wolverine, during which the majority of the line (aside from X-Men, New Mutants, and Sabretooth) was put on pause. X Lives and X Deaths then served as the foundation of a new relaunch titled Destiny of X.

When the issues were re-released in trade paperback collections in 2022, this phase was split and renamed into Reign of X and Trials of X. IGN highlighted that "Reign of X showcases Krakoa at the height of its power and influence. Trials of X is about the new and growing threats to Krakoa, as storm clouds begin to gather on the horizon".

== Titles ==
=== Ongoing series ===
Title	Issues	Writer(s)	Artist(s)	Colourist(s)	Debut date	Conclusion date
Hellions	#7–18	Zeb Wells	Stephen Segovia; Rogê Antônio; Ze Carlos	David Curiel; Rain Beredo	December 2, 2020	December 8, 2021
X-Factor (vol. 4)	#5–10	Leah Williams	David Baldeón; David Messina; Lucas Werneck	Israel Silva	December 2, 2020	June 30, 2021
S.W.O.R.D. (vol. 2)	#1–11	Al Ewing	Valerio Schiti; Stefano Caselli; Guiu Vilanova; Jacopo Camagni	Marte Gracia; Fernando Sifuentes	December 9, 2020	December 22, 2021
Marauders	#16–27	Gerry Duggan	Stefano Caselli; Matteo Lolli; Klaus Janson; Ivan Fiorelli; Phil Noto; Creees Lee	Edgar Delgado; Rain Beredo; Phil Noto	December 9, 2020	January 12, 2022
New Mutants (vol. 4)	#14–24	Vita Ayala	Rod Reis; Alex Lins; Danilo S. Beyruth	Rod Reis; Matt Milla; Dan Brown	December 16, 2020	February 9, 2022
X-Force (vol. 6)	#15–26	Benjamin Percy	Joshua Cassara; Garry Brown; Robert Gill; Martin Coccolo	Guru-eFX	December 16, 2020	December 15, 2021
Excalibur (vol. 4)	#16–26	Tini Howard	Marcus To	Erick Arciniega	December 23, 2020	December 15, 2021
Wolverine (vol. 7)	#8–19	Benjamin Percy	Adam Kubert; Viktor Bogdonavic; Scot Eaton; Lan Medina; Paco Diaz; Javier Fernandez	Frank Martin; Matt Wilson; Java Tartaglia; Dijjo Lima	December 30, 2020	December 22, 2021
X-Men (vol. 5)	#16–21	Jonathan Hickman	Phil Noto; Brett Booth; Mahmud Asrar; Francesco Mobili; Nick Dragotta; Russell Dauterman; Lucas Werneck; Sara Pichelli	Phil Noto; Sunny Gho; Nolan Woodard; Matt Wilson; Frank Martin	December 30, 2020	June 9, 2021
Cable (vol. 4)	#7–12	Gerry Duggan	Phil Noto		January 20, 2021	July 28, 2021
Children of the Atom	#1–6	Vita Ayala	Bernard Chang; Paco Medina	Marcelo Maiolo; David Curiel	March 10, 2021	August 11, 2021
Way of X	#1–5	Si Spurrier	Bob Quinn	Java Tartaglia	April 21, 2021	August 18, 2021
X-Corp	#1–5	Tini Howard; Jason Loo	Alberto Foche; Valentine De Landro; Jason Loo	Sunny Gho; Jason Loo	May 12, 2021	September 22, 2021
X-Men (vol. 6)	#1–9	Gerry Duggan	Pepe Larraz; Javier Pina; Ze Carlos	Marte Gracia; Erick Arciniega	July 7, 2021	March 2, 2022

=== Limited series ===
Title	Issues	Writer	Artist	Colourist	Debut date	Conclusion date
X-Men: The Trial of Magneto	#1–5	Leah Williams	Lucas Werneck	Edgar Delgado	August 18, 2021	December 22, 2021
Inferno (vol. 2)	#1–4	Jonathan Hickman	Valerio Schiti; Stefano Caselli; R. B. Silva	Marte Gracia	September 29, 2021	January 5, 2022
X Lives of Wolverine	#1–5	Benjamin Percy	Joshua Cassara	Frank Martin	January 19, 2022	March 16, 2022
X Deaths of Wolverine	#1–5	Benjamin Percy	Federico Vicentini	Frank Martin	January 26, 2022	March 23, 2022
Devil's Reign: X-Men	#1–3	Gerry Duggan	Phil Noto		January 19, 2022	March 23, 2022

=== One-shots ===
Title	Writer	Artist	Colorist	Release date
King in Black: Marauders	Gerry Duggan	Luke Ross	Carlos Lopez	February 3, 2021
X-Men: Curse of the Man-Thing	Steve Orlando	Andrea Broccardo	Guru e-FX	May 5, 2021
Planet-Size X-Men	Gerry Duggan	Pepe Larraz	Marte Gracia	June 16, 2021
Cable: Reloaded	Al Ewing	Bob Quinn	Java Tartaglia	August 25, 2021
X-Men: The Onslaught Revelation	Si Spurrier	Bob Quinn	Java Tartaglia	September 22, 2021
The Death of Doctor Strange: X-Men/Black Knight	Si Spurrier	Bob Quinn	Israel Silva	January 19, 2022
Secret X-Men	Tini Howard	Francesco Mobili	Jesus Aburtov	February 9, 2022

== List of issues ==
=== Release order ===
1. Hellions #7
2. X-Factor #5
3. S.W.O.R.D. #1
4. Marauders #16
5. New Mutants #14
6. X-Force #15
7. Excalibur #16
8. X-Men #16
9. Wolverine #8
10. X-Factor #6
11. Hellions #8
12. Marauders #17
13. S.W.O.R.D. #2
14. Cable #7
15. New Mutants #15
16. X-Force #16
17. Excalibur #17
18. Wolverine #9
19. X-Men #17
20. X-Factor #7
21. Hellions #9
22. King in Black: Marauders #1
23. Excalibur #18
24. S.W.O.R.D. #3
25. X-Force #17
26. Cable #8
27. Marauders #18
28. New Mutants #16
29. Wolverine #10
30. X-Men #18
31. Hellions #10
32. Children of the Atom #1
33. X-Factor #8
34. S.W.O.R.D. #4
35. X-Force #18
36. Cable #9
37. Excalibur #19
38. X-Men #19
39. Excalibur #20
40. Marauders #19
41. Children of the Atom #2
42. Wolverine #11
43. S.W.O.R.D. #5
44. Way of X #1
45. X-Force #19
46. Cable #10
47. New Mutants #17
48. Hellions #11
49. Marauders #20
50. Children of the Atom #3
51. X-Corp #1
52. X-Factor #9
53. Way of X #2
54. Wolverine #12
55. New Mutants #18
56. X-Men #20
57. Marauders #21
58. X-Force #20
59. Hellions #12
60. Excalibur #21
61. X-Men #21
62. Children of the Atom #4
63. Planet-Size X-Men #1
64. New Mutants #19
65. X-Corp #2
66. Wolverine #13
67. S.W.O.R.D. #6
68. Way of X #3
69. X-Factor #10
70. Cable #11
71. Children of the Atom #5
72. Hellions #13
73. X-Force #21
74. X-Men #1
75. Excalibur #22
76. Way of X #4
77. X-Corp #3
78. Marauders #22
79. New Mutants #20
80. Cable #12
81. S.W.O.R.D. #7
82. Wolverine #14
83. Hellions #14
84. X-Men #2
85. Children of the Atom #6
86. X-Force #22
87. Marauders #23
88. Way of X #5
89. X-Corp #4
90. X-Men: The Trial of Magneto #1
91. Cable: Reloaded #1
92. Wolverine #15
93. Hellions #15
94. New Mutants #21
95. Excalibur #23
96. X-Force #23
97. Marauders #24
98. X-Men: The Trial of Magneto #2
99. X-Corp #5
100. X-Men #3
101. X-Men: The Onslaught Revelation #1
102. Inferno #1
103. S.W.O.R.D. #8
104. Wolverine #16
105. Excalibur #24
106. Hellions #16
107. New Mutants #22
108. X-Force #24
109. X-Men #4
110. X-Men: The Trial of Magneto #3
111. Inferno #2
112. Marauders #25
113. S.W.O.R.D. #9
114. Wolverine #17
115. Excalibur #25
116. Hellions #17
117. S.W.O.R.D. #10
118. X-Force #25
119. Wolverine #18
120. X-Men #5
121. Marauders #26
122. New Mutants #23
123. X-Men: The Trial of Magneto #4
124. Hellions #18
125. Inferno #3
126. Excalibur #26
127. X-Force #26
128. S.W.O.R.D. #11
129. Wolverine #19
130. X-Men: The Trial of Magneto #5
131. Inferno #4
132. X-Men #6
133. Marauders #27
134. Devil's Reign: X-Men #1
135. X Lives of Wolverine #1
136. Marauders Annual #1
137. X Deaths of Wolverine #1
138. X-Men #7
139. X Lives of Wolverine #2
140. New Mutants #24
141. Secret X-Men #1
142. X Deaths of Wolverine #2
143. X-Men #8
144. X Lives of Wolverine #3
145. X Deaths of Wolverine #3
146. Devil's Reign: X-Men #2
147. X-Men #9
148. X Lives of Wolverine #4
149. X Deaths of Wolverine #4
150. X Lives of Wolverine #5
151. Devil's Reign: X-Men #3
152. X Deaths of Wolverine #5

=== Reading order ===
Issues marked in bold are marked as red/important in the issue list found in the back of each comic.

1. Hellions #7–11
2. X-Factor #5–7
3. S.W.O.R.D. #1
4. Marauders #16
5. New Mutants #14–18
6. X-Force #15–19
7. Excalibur #16–20
8. X-Men #16
9. Wolverine #8–10
10. X-Factor #8
11. Marauders #17
12. S.W.O.R.D. #2–4
13. Cable #7–10
14. X-Men #17
15. King in Black: Marauders #1
16. Marauders #18–20
17. X-Men #18–19
18. Children of the Atom #1–3
19. Wolverine #11–12
20. S.W.O.R.D. #5
21. Way of X #1–2
22. X-Corp #1
23. **Marauders #21**
24. X-Force #20
25. Hellions #12
26. Excalibur #21
27. **X-Men #21**
28. Children of the Atom #4
29. **Planet-Size X-Men #1**
30. New Mutants #19
31. X-Corp #2
32. Wolverine #13
33. **S.W.O.R.D. #6**
34. Way of X #3
35. X-Factor #10
36. Cable #11
37. Children of the Atom #5
38. Hellions #13
39. X-Force #21
40. **X-Men #1**
41. Excalibur #22
42. Way of X #4
43. X-Corp #3
44. Marauders #22
45. New Mutants #20
46. Hellions #14
47. X-Men #2
48. Children of the Atom #6
49. X-Force #22
50. Marauders #23
51. Way of X #5
52. X-Men: The Onslaught Revelation #1
53. X-Corp #4
54. X-Men: The Trial of Magneto #1
55. Wolverine #15
56. Hellions #15
57. New Mutants #21
58. Excalibur #23
59. X-Force #23
60. Marauders #24
61. X-Men: The Trial of Magneto #2
62. X-Corp #5
63. X-Men #3
64. **Inferno #1**
65. S.W.O.R.D #8
66. Wolverine #16

== Related material ==
Title	Issues	Writer(s)	Artist(s)	Colourist	Dates	Notes
The Best Offense		Zeb Wells	Emilio Laiso	Rachelle Rosenberg	April 2021	Online exclusive short story revealing that neither Armor nor Marrow were elected to join the first Krakoan X-Men team.
Equality		Zeb Wells	Mike Henderson	Rachelle Rosenberg	April 2021	Online exclusive short story revealing that neither Forge nor Strong Guy were elected to join the first Krakoan X-Men team.
New X-Man		Zeb Wells	David Messina	Rachelle Rosenberg	April 2021	Online exclusive short story revealing that Polaris, but not Banshee, was elected to join the first Krakoan X-Men team.
Over Served		Zeb Wells	Nico Leon	Rachelle Rosenberg	April 2021	Online exclusive short story revealing that neither Boom Boom nor Tempo were elected to join the first Krakoan X-Men team.
Popularity Contest		Zeb Wells	Diego Olortegui	Rachelle Rosenberg	April 2021	Online exclusive short story revealing that neither Cannonball nor Sunspot were elected to join the first Krakoan X-Men team.
Runaways	#33–35	Rainbow Rowell	Andres Genolet	Dee Cunniffe	February–April 2021	Wolverine and Pixie respond to Molly Hayes' call to go to Krakoa.

== Collected editions ==
Title	Material Collected	Format	Publication date	ISBN
Reign of X Volume 1	S.W.O.R.D. #1, X-Men #16, X-Factor #5, Hellions #7-8	Paperback	July 6, 2021	9781302931513
Reign of X Volume 2	New Mutants #14, Marauders #16, Excalibur #16, X-Force #15-16, X-Men #17	Paperback	August 10, 2021	9781302931520
Reign of X Volume 3	Marauders #17, New Mutants #15, Cable #7, Wolverine #8-9	Paperback	August 31, 2021	9781302931537
Reign of X Volume 4	Wolverine #10, Excalibur #17, X-Factor #6, Cable #8, Children of the Atom #1	Paperback	October 12, 2021	9781302931667
Reign of X Volume 5	Excalibur #18-19, S.W.O.R.D. #2-3, King in Black: Marauders #1	Paperback	November 9, 2021	9781302931728
Reign of X Volume 6	S.W.O.R.D. #4, X-Men #18-19, Marauders #18-19, X-Force #17	Paperback	November 23, 2021	9781302931858
Reign of X Volume 7	X-Force #18-19, Children of the Atom #2, New Mutants #16-17, Cable #9	Paperback	December 15, 2021	9781302932039
Reign of X Volume 8	Cable #10, Children of the Atom #3, Excalibur #20, X-Men #20, Hellions #9-10	Paperback	January 19, 2022	9781302933715
Reign of X Volume 9	Hellions #11, Wolverine #11-12, New Mutants #18, S.W.O.R.D. #5, X-Factor #7	Paperback	February 15, 2022	9781302933821
Reign of X Volume 10	X-Factor #8-9, X-Corp #1, Marauders #20, Way of X #1	Paperback	March 15, 2022	9781302933937
Reign of X Volume 11	Way of X #2, Cable #11-12, Children of the Atom #4-5	Paperback	April 19, 2022	9781302934064
Reign of X Volume 12	Marauders #21, X-Force #20, Hellions #12, Excalibur #21, X-Men #21	Paperback	July 12, 2022	9781302944988
Reign of X Volume 13	Planet-Size X-Men (2021) #1, X-Corp #2, New Mutants #19, Wolverine #13, S.W.O.R.D. #6	Paperback	August 23, 2022	9781302945107
Reign of X Volume 14	X-Factor #10, Way of X #3, Children of the Atom #6, Marauders #22, X-Men #1	Paperback	September 27, 2022	9781302945169
X-Men: Hellfire Gala Red Carpet Edition	X-Men #21, Marauders #21, Excalibur #21, X-Force #20, New Mutants #19, X-Factor #10, Hellions #12, S.W.O.R.D. #6, Way of X #3, X-Corp #2, Wolverine #13, Planet-Size X-Men (2021) #1	Hardback	December 15, 2021	9781302931568
X-Men: Hellfire Gala	Marauders #21, X-Men #21, Planet-Size X-Men (2021) #1, S.W.O.R.D. #6	Paperback	January 26, 2022	9781302931155
Trials of X Volume 1	X-Men: The Trial of Magneto #1-2, S.W.O.R.D. #7, New Mutants #20-21, Marauders #23	Paperback	October 19, 2022	9781302949532
Trials of X Volume 2	Cable: Reloaded #1, X-Men: The Trial of Magneto #3-5, Wolverine #14	Paperback	November 15, 2022	9781302949549
Trials of X Volume 3	Wolverine #15-16, Excalibur #22, X-Men #2, Hellions #13-14	Paperback	December 13, 2022	9781302949556
Trials of X Volume 4	Hellions #15, X-Force #21-22, S.W.O.R.D. #8, Way of X #4-5	Paperback	January 10, 2023	9781302949563
Trials of X Volume 5	X-Men: The Onslaught Revelation #1, X-Men #3, Excalibur #23, X-Corp #3-4	Paperback	February 14, 2023	9781302949570
Trials of X Volume 6	X-Corp #5, Marauders #24-25, X-Force #23-24, Excalibur #24	Paperback	March 7, 2023	9781302948405
Trials of X Volume 7	X-Men #4, New Mutants #22-23, Wolverine #17-18	Paperback	March 21, 2023	9781302948412
Trials of X Volume 8	Excalibur #25, X-Men #5, X-Force #25-26, S.W.O.R.D. #9	Paperback	April 18, 2023	9781302948429
Trials of X Volume 9	S.W.O.R.D. #10-11, Wolverine #19, Marauders #26, Hellions #16-17	Paperback	May 9, 2023	9781302948436
Trials of X Volume 10	Hellions #18, Excalibur #26, Marauders #27, New Mutants #24, X-Men #6	Paperback	May 23, 2023	9781302948443
Trials of X Volume 11	X-Men #7, Secret X-Men #1, Sabretooth #1, Devil's Reign: X-Men #1-2	Paperback	June 20, 2023	9781302948450
Trials of X Volume 12	Devil's Reign: X-Men #3, X-Men #8, Sabretooth #2-3, Marauders Annual #1	Paperback	July 18, 2023	9781302948467
X-Men: Age of Krakoa – Reign of X Omnibus Vol. 1	Cable (2020) #7-9, Excalibur (2019) #16-17, Hellions (2020) #7-8, Juggernaut (2020) #1-5, King in Black: Marauders (2021) #1, Marauders (2019) #16-19, New Mutants (2019) #14-17, S.W.O.R.D. (2020) #1-4, Wolverine (2020) #8-10, X-Factor (2020) #5-6, X-Force (2019) #15-19, X-Men (2019) #16-19	Hardcover	September 2, 2026	Mahmud Asrar cover: 9781302967154
X-Men: Age of Krakoa – Reign of X Omnibus Vol. 1	Cable (2020) #7-9, Excalibur (2019) #16-17, Hellions (2020) #7-8, Juggernaut (2020) #1-5, King in Black: Marauders (2021) #1, Marauders (2019) #16-19, New Mutants (2019) #14-17, S.W.O.R.D. (2020) #1-4, Wolverine (2020) #8-10, X-Factor (2020) #5-6, X-Force (2019) #15-19, X-Men (2019) #16-19	Hardcover	September 2, 2026	Leinil Francis Yu DM cover
