= Hellions (Marvel Comics) =

Several fictional groups in the Marvel universe

Several fictional groups of mutants have used the name the Hellions in American comic books published by Marvel Comics. The Hellions have always been portrayed as rivals of various teams of younger mutant heroes in the X-Men franchise, initially as actual villains and later on a team that was more of a school rival than actual enemies of the X-Men.

The first and most notable incarnation of the Hellions were students of Emma Frost and the Hellfire Club's Massachusetts Academy, and were rivals of the New Mutants. The original Hellions first appeared in New Mutants #16 (June 1984), created by writer Chris Claremont and artist Sal Buscema. This version of the Hellions ended after an attack by Trevor Fitzroy and a squadron of Sentinels that killed several Hellions.

Two later groups known as the Hellions or New Hellions both fought against various X groups such as Generation X and X-Force. In New X-Men: Academy X (2004), a new group of Hellions were introduced. This time they were a part of the Xavier Institute for Higher Learning – the Hellions were one of several factions that the students were divided into including the New Mutants, with whom they had a rivalry. The Hellions were also the focus of a miniseries titled New X-Men: Hellions (2005). After the majority of mutants lost their powers in the Decimation storyline, the students were combined into one squad as the number of mutants was greatly reduced.

During the Krakoan Age, as part of the Dawn of X publishing initiative, a new ongoing series titled Hellions launched in March 2020 which focused on the most dangerous mutant outcasts. It ended with issue #18 in December 2021 during the Reign of X publishing initiative.

== Fictional character biography ==
=== Hellions (Massachusetts Academy) ===
Hellions
- The Hellions battle their rivals, the New Mutants, in their first appearance. Cover to The New Mutants #16 (June 1984), art by Tom Mandrake.

Publication information
- Publisher: Marvel Comics
- First appearance: The New Mutants #16 (June 1984)
- Created by: Chris Claremont (writer); Sal Buscema (artist)

In-story information
- Base(s): Massachusetts Academy
- Member(s): Beef; Bevatron; Cannonball; Catseye; Cypher; Empath; Firestar (unofficial); Jetstream; Karma; Magik; Magma; Mirage; Roulette; Tarot; Thunderbird; White Queen (teacher); Wolfsbane

The original group of Hellions were apprentices of the Hellfire Club and students of its White Queen (Emma Frost). While attending classes at Frost's Massachusetts Academy, these young mutants secretly trained in the use of their powers in an underground complex beneath the school. They were longtime rivals of Professor Charles Xavier's students, the New Mutants, and once held their own against the X-Men. The original Hellions were:

- Catseye (Sharon Smith), an American girl who can transform into a purple cat-like form. This granted her razor sharp claws, enhanced senses and physical attributes, and a prehensile tail. Catseye originally believed she was a cat with the ability to transform into a human.
- Empath (Manuel de la Rocha); a handsome, yet cruel and arrogant young Spanish man with the ability to sense and manipulate the emotions of others.
- Jetstream (Haroum ibn Sallah al-Rashid), from Morocco, can generate bio-thermal energy that allows him to propel himself through the air and move at superhuman speeds. He is aided in flight by bionically implanted jets that focus his energies and a cybernetic guidance system.
- Roulette (Jennifer Stavros), an American girl from Atlantic City who can psionically influence probabilities, usually through colored disks of energy: white disks for good luck, black disks for bad.
- Tarot (Mari-Ange Colbert), a good-natured girl from Lyon, France with the ability to see past and future events of other people due to a combination of her mutant powers and tarot cards. She can also materialize and animate tangible images of the 2-D avatars/images on her tarot cards. Once materialized, the cards are completely under her mental control and could do her bidding, including aiding her in battle and flight.
- Thunderbird (James Proudstar), the younger brother of deceased X-Man John Proudstar (the original Thunderbird), who possessed similar superhuman physical attributes, senses, and a healing ability. He reformed and has served on the several X-Men teams as Warpath, and is currently a member of the X-Men.

White Emma Frost had another potential Hellion in Firestar (Angelica Jones), but kept the girl from joining the team on field missions while grooming her to be Frost's personal assassin. Firestar eventually learned of Frost's plans and left Massachusetts Academy.

After suffering severe trauma at the hands of the Beyonder, a number of the New Mutants were transferred to Massachusetts Academy by Magneto (then headmaster of Xavier's School for Gifted Youngsters), due to their apparent need for psychic therapy from Emma Frost. While at the academy, the transferred New Mutants — Cannonball, Wolfsbane, Karma, Cypher, Magik, and Magma — were inducted into the Hellions. They soon returned to Xavier's School after their recovery and the revelation that the White Queen had employed Empath to coerce Magneto into allowing the transfer. After an alliance between the X-Men and the Hellfire Club and Magneto's ascension to the Inner Circle as its White King, relations between the Hellions and the New Mutants improved.

Magma, realizing that she held feelings for Empath, eventually returns to the Hellions and the Massachusetts Academy; the two would later leave the team to travel to Magma's home in Nova Roma. James Proudstar also left the Hellions, re-emerging with Cable and the remnants of the New Mutants in X-Force.

Superstrong and durable Beef (Buford Wilson) and bioelectricity-projecting Bevatron (Fabian Marechal-Julbin) were later additions to the group. They were present when the Hellions unsuccessfully challenged the New Warriors over the allegiance of their former member, Firestar.

The original Hellions, save Empath, were killed by Trevor Fitzroy. Emma Frost's guilt over her students' deaths led to her eventual reform. Following the establishment of the sovereign mutant nation of Krakoa, the original Hellions were resurrected.

=== Emplate's Hellions ===
The next group of Hellions was organized by Emplate to attack Generation X, Emma Frost's new group of students.

- Bulwark (Oswald Boeglin) - Bulwark is able to expand his muscle mass. He was later captured and killed by the revamped Weapon X program.
- D.O.A. (George Baker) - D.O.A. is an energy vampire much like Emplate and his skin is invulnerable to most damage.
- Gayle Edgerton - A psychic vampire and the former girlfriend of Generation X's Chamber.
- Murmur (Allan Rennie) - Murmur could open teleportation portals within his line of sight. Depowered.
- Nocturne (Bridget Warner) - Nocturne controls an ebon energy. She was part of Emplate's second team.
- Vincente (Vincente Cimetta) - Vincente can change his body from solid to liquid or gas. He can make his gas state poisonous to inhale.
- Wrap (Nick Bisley) - Wrap is an energy being held together by bandages and possesses superhuman strength. He was part of Emplate's second team.

=== The New Hellions ===
A group of self-proclaimed "New Hellions" emerged to fight X-Force, in X-Force #87–90, whose members included some from the team's past:

- Bedlam (Jesse Aaronson) - Bedlam can produce a bio-electrical field that disrupts electrical systems. He briefly defected from X-Force to join his brother and the New Hellions.
- Feral (Maria Callasantos) - Feral possesses superhuman speed, agility, reflexes and senses. She has a limited healing factor, claws and a tail.
- King Bedlam (Christopher Aaronson) - Jesse Aaronson's older brother, with whom he shares the same kind of disruption powers.
- Magma (Amara Aquilla) - Magma is able to control fire, heat, magma and tectonic plates. She needs to be in her magma form to use these abilities to their full potential. She is a former New Mutant.
- Paradigm - Paradigm was a mutant infused with a Transmode Virus extracted from the alien Phalanx. His head is shown being used to infiltrate Beast's files. Cyclops destroyed it.
- Switch (Devon Alomar) - Switch is able to switch minds with an individual in order to possess their body. Switch reappeared in the series Legion of X, where he was killed while in the body of Tumult.
- Tarot (Mari-Ange Colbert) - Tarot is an original Hellion inexplicably resurrected; Tarot's life was somehow joined to King Bedlam. When he was depowered, she died again.

=== Xavier Institute ===
Hellions
- New X-Men: Hellions #1, cover art by Clayton Henry, which features Emma Frost with the new Hellions

Publication information
- Publisher: Marvel Comics
- First appearance: New X-Men: Academy X #2
- Created by: Christina Weir; Nunzio DeFilippis

In-story information
- Base(s): Xavier Institute for Higher Learning
- Member(s): Emma Frost (advisor); Dust; Hellion; Icarus; Mercury; Rockslide; Specter; Tag; Wither

After the reopening of the Xavier Institute for Higher Learning various training squads are formed. One such group of students, under the tutelage of headmistress Emma Frost, is dubbed "the Hellions". They have an intense rivalry with another such group, the New Mutants, echoing the relationship between the two original groups of the same names. Membership consists of:

- Dust (Sooraya Qadir) - Dust can convert her body into a malleable cloud of dust that she can manipulate at will and which grants immunity to magic. She was one of the 27 students at the Xavier Institute to retain her powers after M-Day. Dust was a member of the X-Men and a student at the Jean Grey School for Higher Learning, and was later a member of Krakoa.
- Hellion (Julian Keller) - The leader of the Hellions; possesses high-level telekinesis. He was one of the 27 students at the Xavier Institute to retain his powers after M-Day. He was a student at the Jean Grey School for Higher Learning and a member of the X-Men, he later joined the nation of Krakoa until its fall. He is now known as the Krakoan.
- Icarus (Joshua Guthrie) - Icarus has the power of flight, a limited healing factor, and the ability to mimic any sound he hears. Icarus was among the students killed in an attack by William Stryker, and later resurrected on Krakoa.
- Mercury (Cessily Kincaid) - Mercury's body is composed of non-toxic inorganic liquid mercury that she can mold into any shape at will, stick to walls with and become protected from magical attacks. She is one of the 27 students at the Xavier Institute to retain her powers after M-Day.
- Rockslide (Santo Vaccarro) - Rockslide possesses a rock-like body that gives him superhuman strength, durability and endurance. In addition, Rockslide is able to violently detonate his entire body at will and then reform on command. Rockslide is one of the 27 students at the Xavier Institute to retain his powers after M-Day.
- Specter (Dallas Gibson) - Specter can merge with his shadow to increase his strength, speed and durability. In this shadow form, he can see in darkness and is immune to darkness-based attacks. Shortly after the squads are formed, he was transferred twice, ending up on the Corsairs squad.
- Tag (Brian Cruz) - Tag can place a psionic imprint upon himself or others that attracted or repelled other people. He was depowered during M-Day and later died during William Stryker's attack. He was resurrected on Krakoa.
- Wither (Kevin Ford) - Wither can decay organic matter by his "death touch". He is one of the 27 students at the Xavier Institute to retain his powers after M-Day.

The four issue miniseries New X-Men: Hellions (2005), by writers Nunzio DeFilippis and Christina Weir with art by Clayton Henry, focused on the Hellions spending the summer in California.

Rich Shivener, in his 2014 essay "No Mutant Left Behind: Lessons from New X-Men Academy X", wrote that "what's interesting is that both New Mutants and Hellions have qualities of heroism and villainy, not to mention diverse thinking and being. More importantly, New X-Men: Academy X's depictions of squad-based learning and formations, with respect to New Mutants and Hellions, further reflects practices among private schools, as well as military schools", of sorting students into groups or houses. In a review of the New X-Men Academy X – The Complete Collection trade paperback, Eric Alex Cline of AIPT thought the Hellions were the only characters to "show promise" and that the Hellions limited series in the collection was "easily the best part of the book". On the limited series, Cline commented that "while the actual villain of the series is rather bland, he helps set the stage for the Hellions to get some solid character development. Some of the most interesting conflicts take place between the mutant teens and their human parents who sometimes fail to protect their children, and who even show prejudice toward them. It's a cool situation to see handled on the page, especially since the mutant metaphor doesn't always stretch that far".

After M-Day, the cataclysmic event that decimated the world's mutant population, only 27 of the 182 students enrolled at the Xavier Institute retain their powers, and the remaining students are folded into a single training squad, the New X-Men.

=== All-New Hellions (Hellfire Academy) ===
After the events of Avengers vs. X-Men, the new Black King of the Hellfire Club, Kade Kilgore, creates the Hellfire Academy, a school for training mutants to be villains. Kilgore recruits for his school some former students of the X-Men and creates a new team of Hellions.

=== Krakoan Hellions ===
Hellions
- Cover to Hellions #1 by Stephen Segovia

Publication information
- Publisher: Marvel Comics
- Schedule: Monthly
- No. of issues: 18
- Main character(s): Empath; Havok; Mister Sinister; Nanny and Orphan-Maker; Psylocke; Greycrow; Wild Child

Creative team
- Created by: Zeb Wells (writer); Stephen Segovia (artist)
- Written by: Zeb Wells
- Artist(s): Stephen Segovia; Carmen Carnero; Main covers Stephen Segovia and Rain Beredo
- Letterer: Cory Petit
- Colorist: David Curiel
- Editor(s): Editor; Jordan D. White; Assistant Editor; Annalise Bissa; Head of X Jonathan Hickman

A Hellions title was launched March 2020 as part of the Dawn of X publishing initiative during the Krakoan Age. Written by Zeb Wells, and drawn by Stephen Segovia, the initial cast comprised Empath, Havok, Mister Sinister, Nanny, Orphan-Maker, Psylocke, Greycrow, and Wild Child. For the majority of the series, Segovia was the lead artist, "but key chapters were also illustrated by Carmen Carnero, Ze Carlos, and Roge Antonio, among others". On the setup of the series, Wells commented:

I wanted to pick at some of the complicated issues that were caused by the mutant society coming together. I really like what [Jonathan Hickman] had done, where as long as you're a mutant you can come live on this island because it was going to be a utopia. But there are some very weird characters who have done some very terrible things. I didn't want it to seem like that would be brushed under the carpet, I wanted to dig into that. We could play with the larger issues of what a society does with the people who can't fit in, or don't want to fit in.

The series was cancelled in 2021 with issue #18 (December 2021) as its last. Hellions established some of the groundwork for Hickman's Inferno (September 2021 – January 2022) event. CBR noted that the series retired John Greycrow's "racist" Scalphunter codename, which debuted during the 1986 "Mutant Massacre" storyline, in the second issue of the series and that Greycrow had major "character development" with a shift towards redemption and heroics during this series. In January 2021, Wells highlighted that Greycrow "carries the themes of the book most explicitly". The character jumped out to Wells during the series "earliest brainstorming stages" – Wells stated, "I see a character who came from pain and violence and then repeated the cycle again and again and never stopped to ask if that is who he really wants to be. And now he's seeing the world change around him, but not sure if he can change".

Hellions was #6 on Entertainment Weekly's "The 10 best comics of 2021" list — Christian Holub opined that since the Krakoan Age relaunch, "the most compelling" X-Men series "was definitely Hellions, which assembled the weirdest, most misfit mutants [...] and tried to find a place for them in paradise. From team leader Mr. Sinister's constant backstabbing to Psylocke's psychic swordplay, Hellions delivered one entertaining story after another until this month's 18th and final issue, which managed to wrap up all of its plot threads and put a cathartic capper on its various characters' quests for redemption". Following issue #18, Lia Williamson of AIPT noted that "Hellions ends the series just as it began: it's emotional, it's weird, and it's delightful" with the final scene focused on a "touching moment between Kwannon and Greycrow, the emotional backbone of this series", which "ends the series on a hopeful note and quite frankly, a happy one". Williamson viewed the series as "both the underdog and sleeper hit of the X-Men relaunch" – "now that the series has reached its conclusion, it's safe to say that it's the closest to perfect an X-Men series has been in the Krakoa era".

Brandon Zachary for CBR commented that "each of the Hellions is arguably in a better place emotionally and mentally than where they were at the beginning of the series, even if some of their personal situations have become worse. [...] The Hellions represented the possibility that mutants could grow from their darker impulses and tendencies, and become better people. And while the team as it was constructed might be done, the concept was clearly a success". In a retrospective at the end of the Krakoan Age, Scott Redmond for ComicsXF highlighted the Hellions as a stand out title. Redmond commented that the series "looked at how those that are broken, outcast, wrapped in darkness, fit into a so-called paradise. It was one of the first titles to really start to poke holes in the Krakoan system, that still was employing methods of punishment and control similar to the world they left behind. This series took characters that we should not want to even glance at and made them empathetic, funny, relatable, and came with heartbreak".

==== Cast ====
Issues	Cast
#1-18	Empath; Havok; Mister Sinister; Nanny; Orphan-Maker; Psylocke; Greycrow (Note: As Greycrow from issue #2 onwards); Wild Child

=== King Bedlam's Hellions ===
Following the fall of Krakoa, King Bedlam reorganized the Hellions. The team now consists of King Bedlam, Jesse Bedlam, Boom-Boom, Locus, and Fantomex.

== Other versions ==
=== Age of Apocalypse ===
The original Hellions appear briefly in an alternate universe depicted in the "Age of Apocalypse" storyline as former agents of Apocalypse. After Apocalypse's death, the Hellions become renegades and are hunted down and captured by the X-Men on the United States government's behalf.

=== House of M ===
In an alternate universe depicted in the "House of M" storyline, the Hellions exist as S.H.I.E.L.D.'s "Hellion Squad", led by Danielle Moonstar and consisting of Hellion, Magik, Quill, Surge, Synch, and Wind Dancer.

== Issues ==
=== Volume 1 ===
Issue	Publication date	Writer	Artist(s)	Colorist	Comic Book Roundup rating	Estimated sales to North American retailers (first month)	Notes
#1	March 25, 2020	Zeb Wells	Stephen Segovia	David Curiel	8.3 by 21 professional critics	55,772	None
#2	July 22, 2020	Zeb Wells	Stephen Segovia	David Curiel	8.2 by 14 professional critics	Data not available	None
#3	August 26, 2020	Zeb Wells	Stephen Segovia	David Curiel	8.1 by 10 professional critics	Data not available	None
#4	September 16, 2020	Zeb Wells	Stephen Segovia	David Curiel	8.4 by 9 professional critics	33,000–39,000	None
#5	October 14, 2020	Zeb Wells	Carmen Carnero	David Curiel	8.2 by 10 professional critics	41,500–46,000	X of Swords tie-in
#6	November 18, 2020	Zeb Wells	Carmen Carnero	David Curiel	7.7 by 9 professional critics	Data not yet available	X of Swords tie-in
#7	December 2, 2020	Zeb Wells	Stephen Segovia	David Curiel	7.6 by 8 professional critics	Data not yet available	None
#8	January 6, 2021	Zeb Wells	Stephen Segovia	David Curiel	8.3 by 6 professional critics	Data not yet available	None
#9	February 3, 2021	Zeb Wells	Stephen Segovia	David Curiel	8.1 by 10 professional critics	Data not yet available	None
#10	March 3, 2021	Zeb Wells	Stephen Segovia	David Curiel	8.2 by 9 professional critics	Data not yet available	None
#11	May 5, 2021	Zeb Wells	Stephen Segovia	David Curiel	8.3 by 9 professional critics	Data not yet available	None
#12	June 02, 2021	Zeb Wells	Stephen Segovia	David Curiel	8.5 by 10 professional critics	46,810	Hellfire Gala tie-in
#13	July 07, 2021	Zeb Wells	Roge Antonio	Rain Beredo	8.5 by 7 professional critics	34,802	None
#14	August 04, 2021	Zeb Wells	Roge Antonio	Rain Beredo	8.5 by 6 professional critics	36,284	None
#15	September 01, 2021	Zeb Wells	Roge Antonio	Rain Beredo	8.8 by 7 professional critics	32,527	None
#16	October 06, 2021	Zeb Wells	Stephen Segovia	Rain Beredo	8.8 by 8 professional critics	11,695	None
#17	November 10, 2021	Zeb Wells	Stephen Segovia	Rain Beredo	9.1 by 6 professional critics	8,357	None
#18	December 08, 2021	Zeb Wells	Ze Carlos & Stephen Segovia	Rain Beredo	9.6 by 6 professional critics	13,162	None

=== Collected editions ===
Title	Material collected	Format	Publication date	ISBN
New X-Men (2004 series)
New X-Men: Hellions	New X-Men: Hellions #1-4	Trade paperback	November 2005	0-7851-1746-6
New X-Men: Academy X – The Complete Collection	New X-Men: Academy X #1–15, New X-Men: Academy X Yearbook #1, New X-Men: Hellions #1–4	Trade paperback	December 2018	978-1302910327
Hellions (vol. 1)
Hellions by Zeb Wells – Volume 1	Hellions #1–4	Trade paperback	December 1, 2020	ISBN 978-1302925581
Hellions by Zeb Wells – Volume 2	Hellions #7–11	Trade paperback	August 17, 2021	ISBN 978-1302925598
Hellions by Zeb Wells – Volume 3	Hellions #12–18	Trade paperback	February 1, 2022	ISBN 978-1302930189
Hellions by Zeb Wells	Hellions #1–18	Hardcover	August, 2022	ISBN 978-1302933722

== See also ==
- Hellfire Club (comics)
- Massachusetts Academy (comics)
- New Mutants
