= Wild Child (character) =

- Wild Child as depicted in Wolverine (vol. 3) #55 (September 2007). Art by Simone Bianchi.

Publication information
- Publisher: Marvel Comics
- First appearance: Alpha Flight #1 (Aug 1983) (cameo) (full introduction) Alpha Flight #11
- Created by: John Byrne

In-story information
- Alter ego: Kyle Gibney
- Species: Human mutant
- Team affiliations: Weapon X Alpha Flight; X-Factor; Omega Flight; Gamma Flight; Hellions
- Notable aliases: Weapon Omega; Wildheart
- Abilities: Superhuman senses, speed, agility, reflexes, coordination, balance, endurance; Regenerative healing factor; Slowed aging process; Razor sharp claws and fangs; Olympic-level trained acrobat/gymnast; Special ops-trained hand-to-hand combatant

Kyle Gibney is a character appearing in American comic books published by Marvel Comics. Created by writer and artist John Byrne, the character first appeared in Alpha Flight #1 (August 1983). Gibney is a mutant—a subspecies of humans born with superhuman abilities—and is known under the codename Wild Child (also spelled Wildchild). He has also used the aliases Weapon Omega and Wildheart. Gibney has been portrayed as both a superhero and a supervillain and has been affiliated with several teams, including Alpha Flight, X-Factor, and Weapon X.

== Publication history ==
Kyle Gibney made a cameo appearance in Alpha Flight #1 (August 1983), created by John Byrne, but did not appear in full until Alpha Flight #11. He subsequently appeared in several Marvel series, including Darkhawk (1991), Death Metal (1994), Weapon X: The Draft - Agent Zero (2002), and Hellions (2020).

== Fictional character biography ==
Kyle Gibney is a mutant who manifested a feral mutation during puberty; this mutation grants him enhanced physical abilities, an increased rate of regeneration, and a bestial appearance. This prompts his parents to throw him out of their house. Living on the streets, he is kidnapped by the conspiratorial Secret Empire and subjected to experimentation that alters his mind and body, making him mentally unstable and prone to violent and animalistic behavior. During this time, he becomes acquainted with Valerie Cooper, a United States government official who is unaware of the Secret Empire's true nature or activities. He is freed by Wyre, a man who has unwittingly been the source for the genetic material used in the Empire's experiments. Gibney (now Wild Child) is detained by the military and taken into the custody of Canada's secret Department H, which oversees the formative Alpha Flight team. Flight member Walter Langkowski, wanting to protect Wild Child from the military, places him in the trainee team dubbed Gamma Flight. After Alpha Flight and its trainee groups are disbanded, Gibney is recruited to join Omega Flight.

Wild Child is given membership in the new Gamma Flight. When Gamma Flight is disbanded, he goes berserk over his deprecated status and attacks Pathway, another trainee. Gamma's leader Nemesis teleport him away during a fight with Heather Hudson (Guardian) and Wolverine, and he is captured by Wolverine. Department H helps him overcome his psychological problems, trains him in unarmed combat, and places him as a special operative of the Canadian government assigned to Alpha Flight under the codename Weapon Omega. Wild Child later defeats Wyre in personal combat; he then learns about his true origin, and changes his codename to Wildheart.

Wild Child's appearance deteriorates back to his initial feral form, which prompts him to leave Alpha Flight and his lover Aurora. He follows Valerie Cooper to the United States, where he joins X-Factor. There he begins a romantic relationship with his teammate Shard. His teammate Sabretooth unsuccessfully attempts to convince Wild Child to become a hunter and killer like himself. Wild Child degenerates to a near-mindless state and is recruited into the new Weapon X team.

As part of his draft into Weapon X, Wild Child is paired with Sabretooth to try and recruit Sunfire to the program. However, he refuses and badly burns Sabretooth. When Wild Child mocks his burns, Sabretooth slits his vocal cords, leaving him mute. His past flame, Aurora, is later recruited into the team but is not herself. She becomes cocky and aloof, snubbing Wild Child and engaging in a relationship with Weapon X director Brent Jackson.

Wild Child is one of the mutants depowered after M-Day. His energy signature is found within the Collective, along with the energy signatures of many other depowered mutants. It is later revealed that Wild Child regained his powers and his previously erased memories, along with his capability of speech.

In the new status quo for mutants post-House of X and Powers of X, Professor X and Magneto invite all mutants to live on Krakoa and welcome even former enemies into their fold. Wild Child joins a loose group of outcast mutants, operating under Mister Sinister: the Hellions, which also include Havok, Kwannon, Empath, John Greycrow, and Nanny and Orphan-Maker.

During a mission to Arakko, the Hellions encounter Tarn the Uncaring and his Locus Vile. In the ensuing battle, Wild Child is killed. He is resurrected, albeit stronger and with a more aggressive and impulsive personality as a result of dying in the dimension of Amenth.

== Powers and abilities ==
Kyle Gibney is a mutant who was experimented upon and genetically engineered by Secret Empire scientists using DNA replicated from Wyre. He has superhumanly acute senses, as well as superhuman speed, agility, reflexes, coordination, balance, and endurance. His teeth and nails are hardened and strong enough to rend substances as thick as bone. His body heals at a rate several times greater than that of a normal human being but not at the rate of Sabretooth's healing factor. He also has various animal-like mutations common for "feral" mutants: leaf-shaped ears and eyes with neither pupils nor irises.

He is an excellent hand-to-hand combatant with both special ops and martial arts training from Wolverine as well as the Canadian government's superhero Flight program, and is also trained in acrobatics and gymnastics. In his bestial rages, he relies more on sheer ferocity than fighting skill. As Wildheart, the savage, bestial side of his personality was suppressed by an unknown drug, but still threatened to overwhelm his mind.

== Reception ==
Darren Franich of Entertainment Weekly ranked Wild Child 93rd in their "Let's rank every X-Man ever" list. Comic Book Resources noted him as one of Marvel's fastest sidekicks, and a failure of the Weapon X programme.

== Other versions ==
Alternate versions of Kyle Gibney appear in Marvel's multiverse.

=== Age of Apocalypse ===
An alternate universe version of Wild Child from Earth-295 appears in "Age of Apocalypse". This version is a member of the X-Men who possesses a low level of intelligence comparable to that of a dog and is incapable of speech. Wild Child is later found by an alternate universe version of Quentin Quire and taken to his universe to replace its version of Wild Child, who was not supposed to have died. After returning to his original universe, Wild Child is killed while trying to stop Archangel's genocidal plans on Earth-616.

=== Other versions ===
Wild Child is a member of the Red Guard under Exodus in House of M, he roams Canada with Wolverine and Sabretooth as the Pack in Mutant X, with other versions appearing in Avengers of the Wastelands, Weapon X: Days of Future Now., and Ultimate Marvel

== In other media ==
=== Miscelleanous ===
- Kyle Gibney / Wild Child makes a non-speaking cameo appearance in the X-Men: The Animated Series episode "One Man's Worth" as a member of Magneto's mutant resistance.
- Kyle Gibney / Wild Child appears as a playable card in Marvel Snap.

=== Merchandise ===
- In 1995, Toy Biz released a Kyle Gibney / Wild Child action figure as part of its Age of Apocalypse toy line.
- In 2016, HeroClix released a Kyle Gibney / Wild Child figure as part of the Uncanny X-Men line.
- In 2020, Hasbro released a Kyle Gibney / Wild Child action figure as part of the Marvel Legends line.
