= Kwannon (character) =

- Textless variant cover of Hellions #11 (July 2021). Art by Gerald Parel.

Publication information
- Publisher: Marvel Comics
- First appearance: As "Betsy Braddock": X-Men (vol. 2) #17 (February 1993); As Revanche: X-Men (vol. 2) #21 (April 1993); As Kwannon: X-Men (vol. 2) #22 (May 1993; origin flashback); X-Men (vol. 2) #31 (April 1994; present-day appearance and death); Resurrection: Hunt for Wolverine: Mystery in Madripoor #4 (August 2018); As Psylocke: Fallen Angels #1 (November 2019)
- Created by: Fabian Nicieza; Andy Kubert

In-story information
- Species: Human mutant
- Team affiliations: Avengers Unity Division; Marauders; Great Captains of Krakoa; Hellions; Fallen Angels; X-Men; The Hand
- Notable aliases: Betsy Braddock; Revanche; Psylocke
- Abilities: Originally: Psychic Empathy; Low-level telepathy; Later: Telepathy; Psionic Blade Generation; Telekinesis; Master martial artist and swordswoman

Kwannon is a character appearing in American comic books published by Marvel Comics, usually affiliated with the X-Men. She has been closely entwined with Betsy Braddock, with whom Kwannon was body swapped for 25 years of publication history. She first appeared in X-Men #17 (February 1993). At the time, the white Braddock had been in an Asian woman's body for some time (now established as Kwannon's); a new person, looking identical to the original Betsy, arrived claiming she was the real Betsy. Braddock and Kwannon had a psychic link that resulted in the woman in both bodies believing she was the 'real' Betsy Braddock. It was initially left ambiguous as to which of the two was the real Betsy and which was the real Kwannon, but it would later be established that a body swap had indeed occurred, with Kwannon in Betsy's body. In stories published during this period, the character used the moniker Revanche while believing herself to be Betsy, and went by Elizabeth Braddock to distinguish herself from the other Betsy. Kwannon would later die and recover her original memories. After being resurrected in her original body in the 2018 storyline "Hunt for Wolverine", Kwannon became the current Psylocke, while Betsy also returned to her original body and became the new Captain Britain.

In her initial appearances, the character was depicted as a former assassin for the Hand with low-level empathic telepathy abilities and the power to generate a psionic sword. Since the franchise-wide relaunch Dawn of X, Kwannon has been featured as Psylocke in Fallen Angels, Hellions, Marauders, and Uncanny Avengers. Since the X-Men: From the Ashes relaunch, Kwannon has appeared as a member of Cyclops' core team in X-Men as well as headlining a self-titled Psylocke solo ongoing series.

== Publication history ==
The mindless body of Kwannon originally appeared as the apparently transformed body of Betsy Braddock in Uncanny X-Men #256 (December 1989), written by Chris Claremont and illustrated by Jim Lee. Braddock was a British woman, but passed through the Siege Perilous, a magical portal that relocated people and rewrote their memories. She got amnesia, took on the appearance of a Japanese woman, and also gained ninja powers. Years later, new writers explained that this new identity was actually a different person she had been body-swapped with, instead of her original white body having been altered to appear Asian, as depicted in the original comic.

Kwannon first appeared as a new character separate from Psylocke in X-Men (vol. 2) #17 (February 1993), created by writer Fabian Nicieza and artist Andy Kubert. The story established that Betsy and Kwannon had their minds linked to explain both of them now having both Betsy's psychic powers and Kwannon's assassin training. In X-Men comics of 1993–1994, she presented as a second Betsy Braddock going by the codename Revanche and the civilian name Elizabeth, with it being kept ambiguous as to whether Betsy or Elizabeth was Kwannon, both women having a "psychic lock" (psylocke) of the other in their minds. In X-Men (vol. 2) #31 (1994), this uncertainty ended with Elizabeth's death due to the Legacy Virus, wherein she recovers her memories as Kwannon on her deathbed. Much of the early narrative surrounding the character of Kwannon was confused by continuity errors created by Nicieza, who had failed to read The Uncanny X-Men #255, which depicts the character of Psylocke being discovered on the shores of an island by ninjas of The Hand. Kwannon's origin described in X-Men (vol. 2) #22 directly contradicted this scene, so subsequent comics introduced a convoluted series of events to explain away this and other inconsistencies. The original body of Betsy Braddock which she had come to possess is later briefly resurrected by The Sisterhood in The Uncanny X-Men #509, without Kwannon's spirit.

Kwannon is later resurrected permanently and returned to her original body in the final pages of the 2018 limited series Hunt For Wolverine: Mystery In Madripoor #4, and she resurfaces in the 2019 series The Uncanny X-Men (vol. 5) #16.

During the Krakoan Age, Kwannon took on the mantle of Psylocke as part of the new Fallen Angels team alongside Cable and X-23. The relaunch was written by Bryan Edward Hill and penciled by Szymon Kudranski. After the conclusion of the Fallen Angels mini series, Kwannon was featured as the field leader of Mister Sinister's Hellions in the series of the same name written by Zeb Wells and Stephen Segovia. Kwannon was later featured as a member of the Marauders as the team was refocused on their mission of mutant rescue in the series relaunch by writer Steve Orlando.

As part of the X-Men: From the Ashes relaunch, Kwannon headlined the ongoing series Psylocke (vol. 2) written by Alyssa Wong with art by Vincenzo Carratù, spun out of Jed MacKay and Ryan Stegman's X-Men (vol. 7), which featured Kwannon.

== Fictional character biography ==
Kwannon is first seen as the prime assassin of the Japanese crime lord Nyoirin and lover of Hand assassin Matsu'o Tsurayaba. With the criminal interests of Nyoirin and the Hand quickly coming into conflict, Kwannon elicits a promise from Matsu'o that they will fight to the death rather than betray their respective lords. During a duel at the estate of Nyoirin, Kwannon eventually falls from a cliff; with her physical injuries and lack of oxygen while underwater causing her to become brain-damaged and comatose. Nyoirin, who possesses an unrequited love for Kwannon, bids that Matsu'o take her to the Hand to be healed, with the promise that he will not cross their organisation again. The Hand is able to use their scientific and mystical resources to keep Kwannon's body alive, but is unable to resuscitate her mind.

=== Betsy Braddock body swap ===
Kwannon in Betsy Braddock's body, as Revanche.

Around this time, the Hand discovers Betsy Braddock washed ashore on one of their bases in the South China Sea, suffering complete amnesia after having passed through the Siege Perilous. Matsu'o and Nyoirin discuss placing Kwannon's mind in Betsy's body, which will require the use of the Mandarin's rings. It is revealed that Kwannon possesses low-level telepathic abilities that make her mind capable of withstanding direct contact with the mind of a powerful psychic such as Betsy.

Matsu'o strikes a deal with Spiral to ensure Kwannon's body is healed enough to survive the stresses of the procedure. The healing process, which involves magic and the alien technology of Spiral's Body Shoppe, results in Betsy and Kwannon's DNA intermingling and genetically transforming them both into mixed-race Eurasian females with similar facial features, eyes, purple hair, and telepathic abilities. Both women are also now able to create psychic weapons - Betsy a blade of focused telepathic energy from the back of her right hand, and Kwannon a psychic katana construct.

Betsy briefly operates as the Mandarin's assassin before breaking free and rejoining the X-Men. Meanwhile, Spiral meets with Nyoirin, heavily implying that Betsy's former body now contains the remnants of Kwannon's mind. Seizing this opportunity, Nyoirin takes this body back to his estate, nursing Kwannon back to physical health, while at the same time retraining her and feeding her lies regarding her history and identity.

At Nyoirin's behest, Kwannon, believing herself to be the true Elizabeth Braddock, travels to America, infiltrating the X-Mansion and showing enough skill with her telepathy to mask her mind from Jean Grey, Charles Xavier, and Betsy. Confronted by Charles Xavier and the X-Men, Kwannon states that she is the real Betsy Braddock, and that the Psylocke they are harboring is an imposter sent by Nyoirin to assassinate them all.

Kwannon, now known as Revanche, travels to Japan with Betsy, Beast, and Gambit to find answers regarding her past, but they do not find anything useful. Psylocke agrees to let Jean Grey probe her mind, with Jean finding that she and Revanche have been fused on a fundamental level across both bodies, that both Betsys are both Kwannon and Elisabeth Braddock merged as one in two bodies as a "psychic lock" (psylocke). While on a mission with the X-Men's Blue team, Revanche reveals she is suffering from the Legacy Virus, a virus that is fatal to mutants.

The Legacy Virus increases Revanche's powers, restoring her memories. Revanche then confronts Matsu'o, who denies any involvement with her and Betsy's situation. With her death imminent, Revanche begs Matsu'o to kill her, to which he complies. Her death is felt telepathically by Psylocke and Archangel, while some of the telepathic energy she wielded is imprinted onto Matsu'o.

=== Resurrection ===
During the "Hunt for Wolverine" storyline, Psylocke's soul is absorbed by Sapphire Styx, leaving her body dead. As Psylocke's soul escapes, she instinctively reforms a new body, identical to her original body. Later, Kwannon is revealed to be returned to life in her original body. She ambushes a henchman in Viper's penthouse, manifesting one of Psylocke's psychic knives.

=== Dawn of X ===
In the new status quo for mutants post House of X and Powers of X, Kwannon is amongst the gathered mutants of Krakoa to celebrate their new lives. She is seen by Betsy Braddock, but they avoid reuniting. Still trying to find her place in this new era, she becomes part of a loose group of mutants that include Kid Cable and X-23, as the Fallen Angels.

Soon after, she assumes a leadership role in another team of outcast mutants: the Hellions, alongside Havok, John Greycrow (formerly Scalphunter), Empath, Wild Child, Mister Sinister, and Nanny and Orphan-Maker. When Betsy arrives on Krakoa, she actively avoids Kwannon due to their past history and corrects several people who attempt to refer to her as Psylocke. During Excalibur, Betsy is accidentally transported into the body of Queen Elizabeth III, an alternate reality version of herself. In this reality, Kwannon is the ex-wife of Angel, the Queen's lover, and reluctantly helps Betsy find her way to Otherworld so that she can return to her original universe. Betsy attempts to find out more about the life of this Kwannon but, after Kwannon reads her mind and finds out about their history, she becomes angry and sends Betsy away. When Betsy returns to her original reality, her teammates suspect that the woman presenting as Betsy is not the real one. As Rogue and Rictor search Apocalypse's lab for answers, they are attacked by Betsy but are saved by Kwannon, who states that it is not the real Betsy Braddock. Kwannon joins a magic ritual that aims to reunite Betsy's consciousness with a clone body but, when this fails, she releases Betsy's consciousness, much to the anger of Excalibur. Kwannon states that only she will be able to find Betsy and heads into Otherworld, where she locates Betsy's consciousness attacking a village. The two battle psychically, with Betsy stating that she is in too much pain over her failures and over what she did to Kwannon. Kwannon explains that neither of them were at fault for Betsy taking over her body and that there is no way to "fix" what had happened, rather they both just have to accept that there will always be a connection between them. Kwannon then takes Betsy's soul back to their original reality and returns it to her body, bringing her back to life and ending their previous animosity.

During the events of Inferno, Psylocke replaces Gorgon as one of the Great Captains of Krakoa.

== Powers and abilities ==
Previous to the exchanging bodies with Betsy Braddock, Kwannon was said to be an "intuitive empath" with "low-level telepathic abilities". The extent and origin of these abilities is unknown. Upon inhabiting Braddock's body, she gained telepathic abilities and the power to generate a katana and other bladed weapon constructs composed of psionic energy. These blades were capable of disrupting a person's neural functions on contact, generally rendering them unconscious. The appearance of the katana varied; on at least one occasion Kwannon was shown to generate a small psychic dagger instead of a full blade. Using her psi-blade, Kwannon could force her way into another telepath's mind.

Though her new body had originally possessed a wide range of telepathic abilities, Kwannon very rarely utilized them. In combat she relied almost solely on her martial arts skill and psychic katana. However, she was shown to possess enough skill and power to successfully shield her mind from Jean Grey's telepathic scans and sneak into the X-Mansion undetected. It was later explained that because of the discomfort of using her newfound telepathy, Kwannon unconsciously projected her frustration and confusion onto the X-Men whenever she was around them, causing them to be more agitated and aggressive in return, and to believe the same lies she herself had been told by Nyoirin. This manipulation was so subtle that none of the X-Men's other telepaths were able to detect it.

Once infected with the Legacy Virus, Kwannon's telepathic powers increased to the point where she was able to cut through the fog of her own clouded memories and recall the truth of her origins. She was also shown to read minds and project her own thoughts, even across continents, and to psionically mask her mind from Professor Xavier's telepathy. Shortly before her death, Kwannon displayed a butterfly-like psychic energy aura similar to that of Betsy Braddock.

After resurrection in her original body, Kwannon has displayed a wider range of telepathic abilities: the capacity to generate the same 'blades' of disruptive psionic energy that Betsy Braddock manifested while in possession of Kwannon's body, the ability to read and project thoughts, project her astral form into the astral plane or into the minds of others, and to identify and track mental signatures over long distances. She often uses her telepathy to read and counter the movements of opponents in physical combat. On various occasions, she also has demonstrated mid-level telekinesis, enabling her to levitate, move and manipulate objects and matter with her mind. Kwannon once created a pair of psionic butterfly wings to fly a longer distance.

Her telekinetic ability is primarily applied in combat scenarios. Kwannon can generate psionic constructs—such as blades, katanas, and daggers—that can interact with both physical matter and psychic energy. In addition to forming these offensive tools, her telekinesis enhances her agility and maneuverability, allowing her to execute rapid directional changes and controlled mid-air movements. Although capable of brief levitation and short bursts of mobility, her telekinetic flight does not extend to sustained, long-distance travel.

== Other versions ==
=== Ultimate Marvel ===
An alternate universe version of Kwannon from Earth-1610 appears in Ultimate X-Men. This version was a comatose teenager possessed by the disembodied consciousness of Betsy Braddock, who was killed by Colossus after being possessed by Proteus, and allowed Kwannon's soul to ascend to the afterlife before taking over her body. Due to Kwannon's younger age, Braddock is no longer able to work for S.T.R.I.K.E. Instead, she goes on to work undercover for Professor X and join the X-Men.

=== House of M ===
An alternate universe version of Kwannon appears in "House of M" as a member of Magneto's elite guards.

=== Ultimate Universe ===
A character inspired by Kwannon called Kanon Sainouchi appears in the Ultimate Universe (Earth-6160) series Ultimate X-Men (2024). She is a senior at Idori High School, a descendants of Sai, an expert fencer, and younger sister of a police officer named Tatsuya.

=== Earth-21270 ===
Featured in Excalibur, this Kwannon is the ex-wife of Warren Worthington III. She acts as a silent-blade mutant-for-hire who escorts a reality-hopping Betsy Braddock.

== Collections ==
Title	Material collected	Publication date	ISBN
Psylocke: Guardian	Psylocke (vol. 2) #1–5	July 8, 2025	ISBN 978-1-3029-6156-5
Psylocke: Nightmares of the Past	Psylocke (vol. 2) #6–10	December 16, 2025	ISBN 978-1-3029-6157-2

== See also ==
- Kwannon
