= Magma (character) =

Marvel Comics superhero

- Magma on the cover of New Mutants vol. 2 #3 (2003). Art by Joshua Middleton.

Publication information
- Publisher: Marvel Comics
- First appearance: The New Mutants #8 (October 1983)
- Created by: Chris Claremont; Sal Buscema; Bob McLeod

In-story information
- Alter ego: Amara Juliana Olivians Aquilla
- Species: Human mutant
- Team affiliations: Brotherhood of Mutants; Hellions; New Hellions; New Mutants; The 198; Paragons; X-Corporation; X-Men; X-Treme Sanctions Executive
- Notable aliases: Alison Crestmere
- Abilities: Ability to generate and control lava; Fire generation and projection; Earthquake generation; Heat immunity

Magma (Amara Juliana Olivians Aquilla) is a superhero appearing in American comic books published by Marvel Comics. Created by writer Chris Claremont, and artists Sal Buscema, Glynis Wein, and Bob McLeod, the character first appeared in The New Mutants #8 (October 1983). Amara Aquilla belongs to the subspecies of humans called mutants, who are born with superhuman abilities. Amara is also known as Allison Crestmere, an identity she assumed after her memory was altered. She possesses the power to manipulate magma and earth, and can turn into a magmatic form.

Amara is from Nova Roma, a secluded area in Brazil that has similar customs to Ancient Rome. She is most known for serving as a member of the New Mutants. The character has appeared in other media, notably in X-Men: Legends.

== Publication history ==
Amara Aquilla debuted in The New Mutants #8 (October 1983), and appeared in that title regularly, until The New Mutants #57 (November 1987) when she departs the titular super-group to join their rivals, the Hellions. Along with the other New Mutants, she appeared as an occasional supporting character in Uncanny X-Men, with issue #189 (1985) as a salient issue featuring her conflict with Selene at the Hellfire Club. After her being dropped from the regular cast, The New Mutants featured two Magma solo stories, occupying the entirety of The New Mutants #62 (April 1988) and The New Mutants #81 (Nov. 1989). The latter was a fill-in issue written while she was still a regular cast member.

Magma appeared infrequently during the 1990s, but did take part in the "Child's Play" crossover through X-Force #32-33 and The New Warriors #45-46 (1994). In X-Force #87-90 (1997), Magma appeared as an antagonist to her former teammates, but her villainous personality was short-lived as she returned to her affiliation with the X-Men in semi-regular publication in New Mutants Vol. 2 (2003-2004) and as a team member in X-Treme X-Men #34-46 (2004). Magma then featured prominently as a member of the 198 remaining mutants on earth in the limited series X-Men: The 198 #1-5 (2006) and then in Young X-Men #1-6 (2008) until returning to regular monthly publication in New Mutants Vol. 3 #1 (2009) wherein she remained as a regular character through issue #50 (2012).

== Fictional character biography ==
=== Early life ===
Magma (Amara Juliana Olivians Aquilla) hails from the fictional country of Nova Roma ("New Rome"), a colony of the Roman Republic reportedly founded shortly after the death of Julius Caesar in 44 BC. The colony is hidden in the Amazon rainforest of modern Brazil, and was ruled until recently by the immortal witch Selene. Amara is the daughter of Lucius Antonius Aquilla, who is presumably a member of the historical gens Antonia which claimed descent from Anton, son of Hercules.

Caught up in a deadly power struggle between Selene and her father, she disguises herself as an indigenous Brazilian and is captured by the New Mutants, who soon discovers her true ethnicity. Her powers manifest after she is abducted by Selene, who throws her into a lava pool. Amara is defeated by Selene, but later rescued by the New Mutants and joins the group as Magma.

=== New Mutants ===
After the New Mutants visit Nova Roma, Magma officially enters Professor X's school and joins the New Mutants. She invades the Hellfire Club's New York headquarters to battle Selene. She is fooled into joining a gladiatorial competition run by the Shadow King, where she partners with Sunspot. Eventually, the efforts of her other friends free her and Sunspot from the games.

Magma and the New Mutants clash with Emma Frost and her team, the Hellions, on multiple occasions. Despite the cruelties displayed by the Hellion Empath, Magma develops an attraction towards him, which distresses her and leads her to leave the New Mutants and join the Hellions.

=== Hellions ===
Magma trains with the Hellions for some time and returns to South America with Empath. It is later revealed that Nova Roma is not Roman, but was created by Selene using mind control on British citizens to recreate Rome, and that Magma's real name is Allison Crestmere. Magma is later crucified by the Church of Humanity, but is healed by Archangel and Elixir. When Cannonball questions her, Magma reveals that Elixir's healing had removed the Allison Crestmere persona, which she now knows to be false.

=== Post M-Day ===
Due to the events of the Decimation, Magma loses her lover when his similar powers are stripped while inside a volcano. His death temporarily drives her insane causing her to attack a nearby town. She is later apprehended by Empath and brought to the Xavier Institute. She is manipulated by the mutant Johnny Dee, who is infatuated with her. Because of previous experience with being emotionally controlled, she incorrectly blames Empath, who denies her accusations.

Along with former New Mutants, Danielle Moonstar, Cannonball, and Sunspot, Magma appears as a member of the Brotherhood of Mutants, led by Cyclops. After Magma is captured, it is learned that Donald Pierce had been posing as Cyclops using an image inducer. Magma helps to capture Pierce and then relocates to San Francisco.

The New Mutants reform when Dani and Karma are captured when out on a call to a small town. Amara is visiting Empath in his cell when she is called away. Magik and Magma are tricked into freeing Legion from a box while rescuing their teammates, but the pair stop Legion's rogue personalities.

=== Fall of the New Mutants ===
After the events of the "Second Coming" storyline, the New Mutants take a vacation, which is interrupted when Magik discovers that Pixie has been kidnapped by a mysterious military faction known as Project Purgatory. The New Mutants search Limbo, and are attacked by the mutant babies gathered during "Inferno", now adults working with Project Purgatory. Magma is captured and held captive along with Sunspot. The pair are freed and defeat the threat.

Magma remains with the New Mutants after some members leave, alongside Dani Moonstar, Cypher, Warlock, and Sunspot. Their first mission is to track down X-Man, who had been kidnapped by Sugar Man.

=== Fear Itself ===
After Dani is summoned to Hel by Hela during an attack by the Draumar, Amara and the rest of the New Mutants go looking for her. They seek help from Magik, who points them to a spell that can get the team to Hel. Cypher performs the spell, but accidentally transports the team to Mephisto's hell. While there, Mephisto takes a special interest in Magma. Impressed by Magma's power, Mephisto offers to help the team in exchange for a single date with her, which she later obliges to.

Amara assists an all-female version of the Defenders.

=== X-Men: Gold ===
During the "Inhumans vs. X-Men storyline, Mesmero uses his powers to hypnotize Magma and other mutants into a new Brotherhood of Mutants team, working under anti-mutant activist Lydia Nance. The group attack the United Nations and later kidnap the mayor of New York City. The X-Men later free Magma and the others from Mesmero's control.

=== House of X ===
Magma later became a resident of the mutant nation of Krakoa during House of X. While there she joined the New Mutants on a mission to bring mutants from her home town of Nova Roma to Krakoa and to save Natashia Repina, a young mutant from Carnelia who lost control of her powers. She also attempts to cause a volcanic eruption to help free the mutants who were wrongfully imprisoned in the Pit of Exile.

== Powers and abilities ==
Magma, when fully lit.

Magma is a mutant with geothermal powers. These grant her control over tectonic plates, even to the extent of causing seismic upheaval. Amara's powers allow her to be so in-tune with the Earth that she is able to sense seismic activity and prevent earthquakes before they happen. She can also call forth molten rock from the Earth's core, producing projectiles composed of lava, or miniature volcanoes.

When using her powers, Magma typically assumes an energized form that emits intense light and heat. While in this form, Amara can increase the temperature around her to the point where anything around her will melt (e.g. metal weapons will melt before hitting her). On another occasion, she has demonstrated this ability without assuming her energized form by heating up the room at a Hellfire Club party causing everyone in the room to sweat to the point of dehydration and blacking out. She can also create orbs of a fire-like substance and use them as projectiles or a source of light. Although Magma has triggered small earth tremors without taking on her energized form, she has never been seen to use her power to control lava while in her ordinary human appearance. On M-Day, she traveled within the heated gases of an active volcano, and demonstrates an immunity to volcanic gases, heat, and flame.

In addition, Amara possesses certain regenerative powers when in contact with the ground. Even when she was once affected by Selene's life-draining touch, she recovered quickly enough to aid the New Mutants in battle. If she is not in contact with the ground or the physical shock to her system from a single injury is too great, the regenerative power is no longer in effect and she may die. Doctor Nemesis discovered that Magma is also able to recover from laceration wounds in her human form by changing to her energized form, with the intense heat cauterizing and sealing any wounds. Since the late 2000s, Amara has also displayed the power of flight. However, this power has been inconsistently portrayed as in some of her appearances in X-Men: Gold show Magma flying but also being carried around by Rogue and Captain Britain.

Due to her Nova Roman heritage, Magma is well versed in Roman culture, including the Latin language, and is a skilled swordswoman.

== Reception ==
In 2014, Entertainment Weekly ranked Magma 79th in their "Let's rank every X-Man ever" list.

Chase Magnett of ComicBook.com described Magma as a "charming firebrand, both literally and figuratively," writing, "Creators ought to ignore whatever parts of her past that confuse the character and focus on a personality that warms up a room even more than her powers might."

== Other versions ==
Many alternate versions of Magma have appeared throughout the character's publication history. In Age of Apocalypse, Magma is an assassin working for Apocalypse until she is killed by Weapon X. In Age of X-Man, Magma is a stunt coordinator at Studio X. In Days of Future Past, Magma and Sunspot become the Chief Arbitrators of the Lords Cardinal and create an idyllic state for mutants, while regular humans are left to fend for themselves. In the Ultimate Marvel universe, Magma is a former mutant prisoner of Camp: Angel and joined Kitty Pryde's resistance. She is later seen as part of a re-formed X-Men team, looking to leave Manhattan because Galactus is attacking. However, the entire X-Men team is recruited by S.H.I.E.L.D. who need mainly Kitty, Magma is seen later defending Utopia against militia members.

== In other media ==
=== Television ===
- Amara Aquilla / Magma appears in X-Men: Evolution, voiced by Alexandra Carter. This version is an Afro-Brazilian teenager and member of the X-Men's junior team, the New Mutants, who lives at the Xavier Institute, displays no apparent connection to Nova Roma, a strong friendship with Tabitha Smith, and a budding relationship with Sam Guthrie.
- Amara appears in the Wolverine and the X-Men episode "Thieves' Gambit", voiced by Kari Wahlgren. This version is a white Brazilian teenager whose powers are tied to her stress and fear.

=== Video games ===
An American version of Alison Crestmere / Magma appears as a playable character in X-Men Legends, voiced by Cree Summer. Initially held prisoner by the Genetic Research and Security Organization (GRSO), the Brotherhood of Mutants attempt to kidnap her so they can use her to power their gravitron device and cause meteor showers around the Earth. However, Wolverine and Cyclops rescue her and take her to the Xavier Institute, where she quickly becomes a student and is later recruited by Professor Xavier to join the X-Men.
