= Church of Humanity (comics) =

Fictional religious sect in comics

Publication information
- Publisher: Marvel Comics
- First appearance: Uncanny X-Men #395 (2001)
- Created by: Joe Casey; Chuck Austen; Ian Churchill

In-story information
- Type of organization: Religious cult/Terrorist
- Leader(s): Supreme Pontiff
- Agent(s): General Vicar; Mister Clean

The Church of Humanity is a fictional organization appearing in American comic books published by Marvel Comics. It is an anti-mutant, Christian-based religious sect. The group was created by Joe Casey and first appeared in Uncanny X-Men (2001). Uncanny X-Men writer Chuck Austen featured the group in a controversial storyline in which they brainwashed Nightcrawler in a plot to overthrow the Catholic Church.

== Fictional history ==
The Church of Humanity preaches that man is created in God's image, but mutants are not. They are a radical offshoot of the Friends of Humanity anti-mutant group, but with a religious discourse, similar to the Purifiers, the followers of Reverend William Stryker. The Church of Humanity is similar to real-life white supremacist religious groups such as the Christian Identity movement.

The Church of Humanity crucify several mutants on the lawn of the X-Mansion, including Skin, Magma, and Jubilee. Archangel heals Magma and Jubilee using his blood, but Skin does not survive. The X-Men investigate and locate the headquarters of the Church of Humanity.

The Church of Humanity operates as a highly organized, heavily armed religious sect that views mutants as an affront to God's creation. Operating from a massive, high-tech cathedral in Montana, the group was led by a mysterious figure known as the Supreme Pontiff. Unlike political hate groups like Graydon Creed's Friends of Humanity, the Church utilizes religious fundamentalism to justify its acts of terror.

In a controversial narrative, the Church attempted to orchestrate the collapse of the Catholic Church. They brainwashed Nightcrawler into believing he was being ordained as a priest, planning to elevate him to the Papacy. The Church then intended to use image-inducers to fake a rapture, exposure of Nightcrawler's demonic appearance, and mass suicides, thereby destroying the faith of billions. The plot was ultimately foiled by the X-Men.

== Members ==
- Supreme Pontiff is the leader of the Church of Humanity.
- General Vicar.
- Mister Clean.
- Mutant 143
