= Nanny and Orphan-Maker =

Nanny
- Nanny as seen in Hellions #1. Art by Stephen Segovia.

Publication information
- Publisher: Marvel Comics
- First appearance: X-Factor #30 (July 1988)
- Created by: Louise Simonson; Walt Simonson

In-story information
- Alter ego: Eleanor Murch
- Species: Human mutant Cyborg
- Team affiliations: Exiles; Hellions; Nanny's Lost Boys (and Girls)
- Abilities: Telepathy, mind control; Scientific genius; Armor provides: Flight, Teleportation, Various gadgets and weaponry including rockets and pistol

Orphan-Maker
- Orphan-Maker as seen on the cover of Hellions #17. Art by Stephen Segovia.

Publication information
- Publisher: Marvel Comics
- First appearance: X-Factor #31 (August 1988)
- Created by: Louise Simonson; Walt Simonson

In-story information
- Alter ego: Peter
- Species: Human mutant
- Team affiliations: Exiles; Hellions; Nanny's Lost Boys (and Girls)
- Abilities: Armor provides: Superhuman strength and resistance Energy weapons

Nanny and Orphan-Maker are supervillains appearing in American comic books published by Marvel Comics. Their first appearances were in X-Factor #30 (Nanny) and #31 (Orphan-Maker). The duo see themselves as "protectors" of mutant children, whom they abduct after murdering their parents. While intelligent, Nanny is highly irrational. Orphan-Maker, who is a young child encased in an adult-sized armor, behaves with the immaturity of his actual age.

== Publication history ==
Nanny and Orphan-Maker first appeared as opponents of X-Factor, a super-team made up of the five original X-Men. Nanny first appeared in X-Factor #30 (August 1988), while Orphan-Maker was introduced in X-Factor #31 (September 1988). They were created by Louise Simonson and Walt Simonson.

They eventually became regular supporting characters in books featuring X-Men-related characters. Their appearances include X-Factor #35 (December 1988), #40 (May 1989), Uncanny X-Men #247-248 (August–September 1989), #265-267 (August–September 1990), Generation X #2-4 (December 1994-February 1995), Generation X Holiday Special #1 (February 1998), Slingers #9 (August 1999), and Wolverine: Killing Made Simple #1 (October 2008).

They received an entry in the Official Handbook of the Marvel Universe Update '89 #5.

== Fictional characters biography ==
=== Origins ===
Eleanor Murch is a mutant with low-level psychic powers who worked as a scientist by the Right. When Murch discovered the Right's anti-mutant agenda, she tried to thwart their plans, only to be captured and sealed in an egg-shaped armor of her creation. She managed to escape, driven insane by her experience. Now calling herself Nanny, Murch vowed to save mutant children, believing that their families were evil. Her first ward was Peter, a mutant with uncontrollable and destructive powers, who she rescued from being executed by Mister Sinister and gave armor to suppress his powers. In the course of their actions, Nanny and Orphan-Maker first clash with the original X-Factor team, then the X-Men.

=== Dawn of X ===
In the new status quo for mutants post House of X and Powers of X, Professor X and Magneto invite all mutants to live on Krakoa and welcome even former enemies into their fold. Nanny and Orphan-Maker join the Hellions, a loose group of outcast mutants operating under Mister Sinister, alongside Havok, Kwannon, Empath, John Greycrow, and Wild Child.

After he and Nanny are killed in battle and subsequently resurrected, Orphan-Maker develops a rebellious streak and attempts to be more independent from Nanny. This does not last long however, and he soon goes back to craving Nanny's attention. Due to Orphan-Maker's earlier behavior, Nanny neglects him and begins caring for an orphaned A.I. baby, unbeknownst to the rest of the team.

After the baby is stolen, Orphan-Maker storms the Right's base to rescue it, desperate to prove himself to Nanny. He manages to single-handedly fight his way to the heart of the compound and find the robot, only for Nanny to storm in and take it from him. In spite of his heroism, she continues to ignore him and pay attention to the robot. However, the robot's mutant-hating A.I. activates, causing it to kill Nanny. Distraught over her death, Orphan-Maker embarks on a rampage, killing everyone he comes across. As a result, Orphan-Maker is sentenced to exile in Krakoa's Pit of Exile, with Nanny choosing to accompany him. After spending some time in the Pit, the two are freed by Cypher along with the other prisoners and tasked with hunting down Sabretooth.

The group is attacked by a super-powered Orchis member called the Creation, who kidnaps Orphan-Maker for experimentation. Nanny assured the rest of the team that, if Orphan-Maker is separated from his armor, no one on Earth will survive. At Orchis's base, Orphan-Maker is taken care of by Dr. Barrington, who manipulates him into removing his mask. Without his mask, Peter's powers activate, killing Barrington and threatening to destroy the Orchis base. Peter is rescued and given a new suit, built for him by Nanny and Jeffries.

== Powers and abilities ==
Nanny is a mutant with low-level telepathic and mind control abilities. She is also a genius-level cyberneticist. Nanny is able to regress the bodies of adult mutants to those of children, presumably through technological means. Her telepathic powers allow her to regress adults to the mindset of a child. Her body is encased within her armor, which allows her to fly and teleport.

Orphan-Maker is a mutant with an unknown but potentially world-ending power. He wields armor that suppresses his powers, is highly resistant to most forms of attack, and has certain reflective properties that enhance his strength and allow him to deflect energy attacks. Orphan-Maker is equipped with large guns that fire destructive energy.
