= Greycrow =

Marvel Comics character

Publication information
- Publisher: Marvel Comics
- First appearance: The Uncanny X-Men #210 (October 1986) (shadow); The Uncanny X-Men #210 (November 1986) (full appearance)
- Created by: Chris Claremont; John Romita Jr.

In-story information
- Alter ego: John Greycrow
- Species: Human mutant
- Team affiliations: X-Men; Hellions (Dawn of X); Marauders; United States Army
- Notable aliases: Scalphunter; John Riverwind; Greycrow
- Abilities: Accelerated healing factor; Technomorphic powers allow him to control and manipulate mechanical constructs into any configuration he desires; Master marksmanship

John Greycrow, known as just Greycrow, is a fictional mutant character appearing in American comic books published by Marvel Comics. Originally known as the villain Scalphunter, the character first appeared in The Uncanny X-Men #210, and was created by Chris Claremont, John Romita Jr. and Dan Green. Greycrow has the ability to manipulate mechanical constructs into any form he desires, as well as superhuman regeneration.

The character was a longtime member of the supervillain group, the Marauders, but joined a superhero team, the Hellions, during the Krakoan Age of X-Men comics, and joining the X-Men themselves thereafter.

== Publication history ==
John Greycrow's first appearance was in The Uncanny X-Men #210, during the Mutant Massacre event, as Scalphunter. The character was created by Chris Claremont, John Romita Jr. and Dan Green. Greycrow also appeared in the "Inferno" storyline and X-Man (vol. 1), dying in both instances.

=== 2000s-present ===
Greycrow's origins were detailed in Weapon X (vol. 2). He also appeared in Civil War: X-Men, Magneto (vol. 3), and the X-Men: Messiah Complex, X-Men: Divided We Stand, Utopia, and Age of X storylines.

Greycrow resurfaced during the Krakoan Age, joining the Hellions, appearing in the 18 issue series, as well as appearing in other books of the era. The name Scalphunter was dropped during the Krakoan Age due to its racist ties, being discontinued in Hellions #2 (July, 2020).

His first appearance was reprinted as True Believers: X-Men: Greycrow.

Greycrow was a major character in the 2024-2025 Psylocke series, appearing in 9 of the 10 issues, including the Blood Hunt debut issue.

== Fictional character biography ==
=== Assembling the Marauders ===
John Greycrow is a member of the Comanche tribe of Native Americans. He fought in World War II for the United States but was to be executed for murdering his fellow officers. He is shot by a firing squad and is believed dead. Due to his mutant healing factor, Greycrow survives and is found and recruited by enigmatic mastermind Mister Sinister.

Years later, he meets the thief Gambit, with the two becoming close friends and co-workers at an Arizona diner. Gambit recruits Greycrow, known as Scalphunter, as a member of the Marauders, a band of assassins operating under Mister Sinister. Sinister sends the Marauders to massacre the Morlocks, a group of mutant outcasts. Gambit apparently follows the Marauders, having learned of their intentions, and manages to save one Morlock, who became known as Marrow. In the course of the Mutant Massacre, the Marauders clash with the X-Men and the original X-Factor team, as well as Thor and Power Pack, leaving several Marauders dead. Scalphunter, along with the other Marauders, has been killed in battle and resurrected numerous times.

=== Post-Decimation ===
Greycrow retains his mutant abilities after the Decimation storyline. In the storyline X-Men: Messiah Complex, Greycrow rejoins the Marauders and joins them in attacking Cooperstown, Alaska to capture the baby "Mutant Messiah". During the X-Men's search for the mutant child, Greycrow shoots and badly injures Nightcrawler.

In X-Men: Divided We Stand, after Sinister's defeat and the death and disbanding of the rest of the Marauders, Greycrow flees to a small town in the desert, in fear of the X-Men. He joins a diner as a cook, where he is confronted by Nightcrawler. Nightcrawler seeks to kill Greycrow, but forgives him for his sins and leaves. The next day, Greycrow is seen back in the diner cooking, now wearing a gold cross.

In the Magneto (vol. 3) series, Greycrow has his leg and arm amputated by Magneto. He returns restored, but is later killed alongside the other Marauders by Chamber.

=== Krakoa ===
In the new status quo for mutants post House of X and Powers of X, Professor X and Magneto invite all mutants to live on Krakoa and welcome even former enemies into their fold, including Greycrow. Some time later, he joins a loose group of outcast mutants, operating under Mister Sinister: the Hellions, which also comprise Havok, Kwannon, Empath, Wild Child, Nanny, and Orphan-Maker. Greycrow begins a relationship with Kwannon during this time. He also ceases use of the name Scalphunter.

=== Fall of Krakoa and From the Ashes ===
After the fall of Krakoa, Greycrow accompanied Kwannon on vacation during "Blood Hunt" and her solo series. Greycrow joins the X-Men after protecting their base from an attack by the organization Z*E*R*O.

== Powers and abilities ==
Greycrow's mutant powers include superior regenerative abilities, which may slow his aging to a degree. He also has techno-morphing powers, which allow him to construct various mechanical devices at a superhuman rate. This is achieved using the numerous components attached to his costume.

Greycrow is an extraordinary master of conventional firearms, and has been known to use a wide variety of other weaponry.

== Reception ==
CBR included John Greygrow in the "10 Great Marvel Characters With Mysterious Backstories" and "10 Strongest Marvel Heroes Red Hood Could Beat" lists.

== In other media ==
Greycrow, alongside the other Marauders, received a Heroclix figure.
