= Empath (character) =

Marvel Comics character

Manuel de la Rocha Empath
- Cover to The New Mutants #62 featuring Magma and Empath (April 1988). Art by Jon J Muth.

Publication information
- Publisher: Marvel Comics
- First appearance: The New Mutants #16 (June 1984)
- Created by: Chris Claremont; Sal Buscema

In-story information
- Alter ego: Manuel Alfonso Rodrigo de la Rocha
- Species: Human mutant
- Team affiliations: X-Corporation; Hellfire Cult; The 198; Hellions
- Abilities: Psionic ability to sense and control emotions of others

Empath (Manuel Alfonso Rodrigo de la Rocha) is a character appearing in American comic books published by Marvel Comics. Created by writer Chris Claremont and artist Sal Buscema, the character first appeared in New Mutants #16 (June 1984). De la Rocha is a mutant, a subspecies of humans born with superhuman abilities, who possesses the power to sense and manipulate the emotions of others.

== Publication history ==
Manuel de la Rocha debuted as a member of Emma Frost's original Hellions in New Mutants #16 (June 1984), and was created by Chris Claremont and Sal Buscema. He subsequently appeared in several Marvel series, including The New Mutants #17, Uncanny X-Men #193, Firestar #2–4, The New Mutants #26, 28, 38–40, 43, 53, 56, 62, Annual #4, The New Mutants #81, X-Treme X-Men #31, 34–35, and X-Men: The 198 #1–5.

== Fictional character biography ==
=== Hellions ===
Empath is born in Castile, Spain. He is a mutant who attends school at the Massachusetts Academy, and is one of the original students of then-villain, the White Queen (Emma Frost). Frost's students, known as the Hellions, are rivals of Charles Xavier's students, the New Mutants. Empath fancies Frost so much that during the night, he attempts to read her mind but she notices instantly, deciding to show him everything about her. Empath is one of the few Hellions to survive an attack by Trevor Fitzroy, who kills most of the Hellions.

During his tenure with the Hellions, Empath meets and falls in love with Amara Aquilla, the New Mutant known as Magma. Aquilla eventually leaves her team and becomes a member of the Hellions, so that she can be close to Empath. He even accompanies her back to her home in Nova Roma. The romance ends when Aquilla realizes that Empath was manipulating her.

=== X-Corporation ===
Later, Empath joins X-Corporation and becomes the communications director for its Los Angeles chapter along with his former love Magma. After M-Day, when most mutants lost their powers, Cyclops orders the closure of the X-Corporation headquarters to better focus all available resources on protecting their members and allies. Empath is one of the few mutants to retain their powers following M-Day.

=== Manifest Destiny ===
Empath resurfaces in San Francisco leading a new group of regular humans calling themselves the Hellfire Cult who are conducting vicious attacks on mutants, despite him retaining his own mutant powers. However, he himself appears to be under the control of a mysterious woman called the Red Queen, with whom he shares a sexual relationship. In the next issue she asks him about Emma Frost and then telepathically makes herself appear as Frost as she sexually dominates Empath. When the X-Men discover the Hellfire Cult's base, she flees leaving Empath behind.

Empath makes a run for it, and his powers seem to be going out of control. While being chased by various X-Men, he takes them down until Pixie appears and beats him savagely. She then stabs him in the head with her soulknife, weakening his powers and blinding him. He is held in prison-like quarters in the X-Men's headquarters, frustrated over his condition and angry against the X-Men. Despite this and the deeds he has committed against her friends and herself, Amara takes pity upon him; hers is the only company Empath accepts.

=== From the Ashes ===
After the Fall of X, Empath, manipulates Hellion and most of the Stepford Cuckoos for his plans to create a new Krakoa that he would lead. He is thwarted by Sophie Cuckoo.

== Powers and abilities ==
Empath is a mutant with the ability to telepathically sense the emotional states, desires, and moods of those around him. He can psionically manipulate and alter these emotions into any state he chooses, such as love, hate, or fear. Empath can influence large groups of people simultaneously, with his control ranging from subtle emotional manipulation to the total negation of feeling, reducing individuals to a zombie-like state in which they can be commanded with ease.

== Other versions ==
An alternate version of Manuel de la Rocha appears in the Age of Apocalypse storyline. Empath is held hostage by Mikhail Rasputin and exploited to control the population of Eurasia, causing him Empath immense pain. After accidentally touching him, Keeper Murdock realizes the pain Manuel is in and kills him.
