= Loa (comics) =

Marvel Comics superhero

- Loa as depicted in Way of X #2 (May 2021). Art by Bob Quinn.

Publication information
- Publisher: Marvel Comics
- First appearance: The New Mutants (vol. 2) #11 (June 2004)
- Created by: Michael Ryan (artist); Nunzio DeFilippis (writer); Christina Weir (writer)

In-story information
- Alter ego: Alani Ryan
- Species: Human mutant
- Team affiliations: Alpha Squadron training squad Defenders; Xavier Institute; X-Men in training Avengers Academy
- Abilities: Intangibility; Disintegration; Underwater adaptation via Atlantean pendant

Loa (Alani Ryan) is a fictional character appearing in American comic books published by Marvel Comics. Created by Michael Ryan, Nunzio DeFilippis, and Christina Weir, Loa debuted in The New Mutants vol. 2 #11 (June, 2004). Loa belongs to the human subspecies known as mutants, who are born with superhuman abilities. She possesses the ability to phase through objects, breaking down their molecular bonds in the process and causing the target to disintegrate.

Loa is a Hawaiian mutant who was a student at the Xavier Institute in the Alpha Squadron, retaining her powers after M-Day. She went on to join the Avengers Academy and assisted the Defenders.

== Publication history ==
Loa debuted as a potential roommate for Laurie Collins in The New Mutants vol. 2 #11 (June, 2004), by Michael Ryan, Nunzio DeFilippis, and Christina Weir. She was a supporting character in X-titles throughout the Academy X, Utopia, and Krakoan eras, notably New X-Men, X-Men: Legacy, and Namor: The First Mutant. Loa received an AAPI month variant cover for Way of X #5, created by Inhyuk Lee.

== Fictional character biography ==
=== Before Xavier's ===
Born in Maui, Hawaii of mixed Native Hawaiian and European ancestry, Alani Ryan quickly developed a talent for surfing. Her mutant powers activate after she and her father are attacked by the villain Great White and his pack of trained sharks. However, they are rescued by Namor. Alani's grandmother Alice Ryan is revealed to be a former acquaintance of Namor and a friend of his former lover Betty Dean. It is also revealed that her "tattooed" appearance is an aspect of her mutation.

=== Alpha Squadron ===
After arriving at the Xavier Institute as a student, she adopts the codename Loa. She is assigned to Alpha Squadron, a training squad advised by Northstar. When Northstar is apparently killed by Wolverine, advising duties for Alpha Squadron are taken over by Karma.

After the Decimation, Loa is one of the 27 students to retain her powers. Loa is among the students who fight for a chance to join the X-Men, but ends up losing. Along with fellow students Mercury and Onyxx, Loa is tasked with keeping peace at the riots on Telegraph Hill after the mutant hate group Humanity Now marches from Sacramento to San Francisco to promote "Proposition X".

=== Utopia ===
During the events of "Necrosha", of Selene's undead force on Utopia, Alani is attacked by three reanimated Acolytes: Fabian Cortez, Seamus Mellencamp, and Marco Delgado. She is saved by Deadpool, who throws Loa at them, disintegrating them.

Loa joins Rogue, Magneto, Indra, and Anole on a trip to visit Indra's family in Mumbai. The group are attacked by three Sentinels, one of which Loa takes down by herself. They are attacked and captured by the Children of the Vault, but defeat them.

During the "Curse of the Mutants" event, Loa accompanies Emma Frost underwater to New Atlantis. She reveals she is well educated in Atlantean history, mythology and culture. She helps in an assault against the aquatic vampires, the Aqueous. When one breaks her helmet, A pendant she is wearing begins to glow, giving Loa the ability to breathe underwater.

=== Death and rebirth ===
Loa is killed during a mutant retaliation. During the "Empyre" storyline, Loa is revealed to have been resurrected on Krakoa. She, Anole, and Rockslide go to Arakko Point on Krakoa and meet with the Summoner, which is interrupted when a Cotati fleet approaches Krakoa. Loa and Mercury attempt to start a relationship at the Hellfire Gala, which ends up not working out.

Loa's powers as depicted in New X-Men (vol. 2) #38 (May 2007). Art by Skottie Young (penciller), Sean Parsons and Jay Leisten (inkers), and Jean-François Beaulieu (colorist).

During the X-Men: From the Ashes reboot following the fall of Krakoa, Loa joins Graymatter Lane.

== Powers and abilities ==
Loa possesses a molecular distortion power that allows her to move through solid matter by disabling binding forces. This causes the matter to crumble, or break down around as she passes through it. Despite having little field experience, Loa has proven herself capable in battle, surviving the Purifiers' assault on the Xavier Institute, defending herself against demons when sucked into Limbo, combating the reanimated dead during Necrosha alongside Deadpool, and holding her own against Sentinels.

Loa has read the Necronomicon and has been at times granted the ability to breathe underwater by an Atlantean amulet.

== Accolades ==
- In 2020, Scary Mommy included Loa in their "Looking For A Role Model? These 195+ Marvel Female Characters Are Truly Heroic" list.
- In 2022, CBR ranked Loa 2nd in "10 Marvel Characters You Should Read For AAPI Month".
- In 2022, Screen Rant ranked Loa 7th in "Marvel's 10 Most Powerful Aquatic Characters, Ranked".
- In 2024, Screen Rant included Loa in "10 Most Underrated X-Men in Marvel History".
- In 2024, CBR ranked Loa 9th in "The 10 Most Powerful X-Men No One Talks About, Ranked".
- In 2024, MovieWeb included Loa in their "X-Men: 20 Mutants Who Must be on the Team in the MCU Reboot".

== In other media ==
Loa makes a non-speaking cameo appearance in the X-Men '97 episode "To Me, My X-Men".
