= Indra (character) =

- Indra as depicted in New X-Men: Academy X Yearbook (December 2005). Art by Georges Jeanty (penciler), Don Hillsman II (inker), Tom Chu (colorist), and Dave Sharpe (letterer).

Publication information
- Publisher: Marvel Comics
- First appearance: New X-Men: Academy X #7 (January 2005)
- Created by: Nunzio DeFilippis; Christina Weir

In-story information
- Alter ego: Paras Gavaskar
- Species: Human mutant
- Team affiliations: Alpha Squadron training squad Xavier Institute; X-Men in training Jean Grey School Students
- Abilities: Retractable armored plates Psionic matter manifestation

Indra (Paras Gavaskar) is a superhero appearing in American comic books published by Marvel Comics. Indra attended the Xavier Institute and was a member of the Alpha Squadron before its closing. He first appeared in New X-Men #7. He became an X-Men trainee in X-Men: Legacy #238.

== Publication history ==
Indra first appeared in New X-Men #7 (December 2005), and was created by writers Nunzio DeFilippis and Christina Weir. The character appeared in a recurring role in the 2010 series X-Men: Legacy. Indra appeared in the 2024 special issue X-Men: The Wedding Special as one of several characters who try to get a wedding gift for Mystique and Destiny.

== Fictional character biography ==
Paras Gavaskar is an Indian mutant. As a teenager, he enrolls in the Xavier Institute. Paras takes the codename Indra and is assigned to Alpha Squadron, a training squad mentored by Northstar. He is a top achiever in his classes. Indra and his fellow team members Anole, Loa, Rubbermaid, Network, and Kidogo are informed that Northstar has been killed in the line of duty, unaware of Northstar's resurrection. Following the assumed death of Northstar, Karma becomes the group's advisor.

Following the events of "House of M", almost all of the institute's students lose their powers, which leads to the dissolution of the school's training squads. Indra is one of twenty-seven students to retain their mutant abilities. He participates in Emma Frost's battle to determine who will train to join the X-Men. Later, forty-two of Indra's former classmates die when their bus is attacked by William Stryker, an anti-mutant crusader. After returning home, Indra discovers that he is the youngest surviving mutant at the Xavier Institute and most likely to be targeted.

Indra knocks out a group of H.A.M.M.E.R. agents in self-defense, violating the most important tenet of his Jain faith—absolute nonviolence. Attempting to access his powers causes him great pain, which Indra believes is divine punishment for betraying his beliefs. Rogue attempts to counsel him, suggesting that his inability to access his powers is psychosomatic. Rogue confronts him with the fact that he chose the codename Indra, the Hindu god of war, despite his pacifistic beliefs, and states that she believes he did so out of belief in his own potential. She further states that rather than embrace that potential, he is choosing to back away from it. This causes Indra to lose control before his powers resurface.

Following the events of "X-Men: Second Coming", Rogue and Magneto bring Indra, Anole, and Loa to Indra's home in Mumbai to visit his family. Unknown to anyone at the time, Indra's parents plan for him to take his comatose brother's place in an arranged marriage. The X-Men and students visit a local market where strange storms had been placing people. During one such storm, the mutants encounter a young girl who tells them that her name is Luisa and that she is a mutant with the ability to paint with light. They do not have time to question Luisa before Sentinels arrive to capture her. Anole and Loa manage to finish the Sentinels off, and the X-Men take Luisa back to Indra's family home.

After being questioned by Magneto, Luisa reveals that her name was really Luz, she is not a mutant, and she is from Quitado; a high-tech floating city where she was a student meant to be a part of a device called Angelfire. At that moment, the Children of the Vault attack Indra's family home. Indra is attacked by a member of the Children of the Vault, who enters his body and causes him severe pain. After Luz gives herself up, the Children of the Vault take Rogue and Magneto back to Quitado. Indra plans on going after them but his father demands that he stay and marry instead. Indra then asks for Vaipala to marry him that day, to which she agrees so he can rescue his friends. During the ceremony, Vaipala reveals that she is actually Luz, having switched places with her during the attack. Returning home, Indra turns his back on his family and religion, believing that the path of non-violence is not the way of fighting against evil.

== Powers and abilities ==
Indra possesses retractable armored plates that he uses to cover himself in protective armor. Though he religiously believes in absolute non-violence, he is later forced to act in self-defense and attack a corrupt military officer, resulting in an internal struggle that causes him to lose access to his powers. When trying to access his armor plating, he experiences great pain and believes this to be a punishment from the Yakshas for his transgression. After receiving mentoring from Rogue, Indra's powers return significantly changed and stronger than before, allowing him to manifest a full suit of armor and psionic weaponry.

== Reception ==
Indra was highlighted as underrated by WhatCulture and forgotten by CBR multiple times.
