= List of New X-Men story arcs =

This article is a list of story arcs for the Marvel Comics comic book series New X-Men.

== New Mutants (vol. 2) ==
=== Back To School ===
New Mutants Vol.2 Issues #1-6

Former New Mutant Danielle Moonstar is convinced to return to the Xavier school as a mutant mentor and recruiter. Dani encounters her first recruit, Sofia Mantega, by chance when the young girl is arrested for using her abilities to manipulate the wind in an effort to gain the attention of her neglectful father. Dani offers to take Sofia to the Xavier school to learn to control her abilities. At the school, currently in its summer session, Sofia meets fellow students Laurie Collins (Wallflower), Julian Keller (Hellion), and Cessily Kincaid (Mercury). Professor X accepts Sofia as a new student and enlists Dani to help him recruit other possible students. Dani helps in recruiting additional students Kevin Ford (Wither) and David Alleyne (Prodigy). Dani is also reunited with former New Mutant Xi'an Coy Manh, who agrees to move back to the school with her younger siblings.

On a recruiting trip to New York to recruit another student, Dani discovers that the last potential student, Joshua Foley (Elixir), may be connected to a mutant-hate group called the Reavers; led by Donald Pierce. Pierce and the Reavers plan to kick-nap Sofia's wealthy father as a way to target her and other mutants. When the students stumble into Pierce's trap, a battle ensues. When a Reaver friend falls in battle, Josh unwittingly uses his mutant healing ability to recover him, outing himself as a mutant. As the battle turns in the students' favor, Pierce arrives and mortally wounds Laurie Collins. Josh attempts to heal Laurie with his ability, while Kevin, in his anger strikes at Pierce in an effort to kill him by decaying his exposed flesh. Dani, unable to physically stop Kevin, must reluctantly use her mutant ability against him; generating a horrifying illusion that he is attacking Laurie instead of Pierce. This vision causes Kevin to halt his assault. The battle now over, Josh, not accepting he is a mutant, rejects the offer to join the school. Kevin, horrified by Dani's illusion, decides to leave the school, deciding he is better living alone where he cannot hurt others. Kevin's leaving wears heavily on Dani as she feels she has failed him. Josh, upon returning home, finds that he is not welcomed back by his friends or family. He arrives to the school seeking admittance, being paired with a reluctant David as a roommate. Dani informs Professor Xavier that she will not continue recruiting and will also leave the school. Before leaving Xavier has her attend a small meeting in his office with her recently recruited students. They are each asked who they would like as a faculty adviser and they all unanimously choose Dani as the person they trust most. This convinces Dani to stay at the school as a teacher/adviser.

=== The Ties That Bind ===
New Mutants Vol.2 Issues #7-12

The new students settle into the new semester. David, Sofia, and Laurie have become fast friends, while Josh feels rejected, primarily by David, due to his past as a Reaver. Laurie likes him regardless. Josh becomes friends with Julian and his group of friends. Dani encourages David to forgive and befriend Josh. She also mentions to David she is worried about former New Mutant Amara (Magma) who lies in a coma in the school infirmary. Josh and Julian decide to try to use Josh's healing powers to revive her and become heroes at the school. Amara revives, but quickly breaks out of the school, injuring the school nurse and leaving damage in her wake. The boys receive detention, and as a result, Josh's parents sign over his custody to the school, disowning him. Later, Julian rejects entry to a homeless mutant girl seeking help at the main gate. During parents week, Sofia has a bad encounter with her father, and in a moment of grief, Emma Frost encourages her to switch to her as an adviser, but Dani quickly quashes the idea. Julian continues to run afoul of his adviser Northstar, and asks to be transferred over to Emma. When Julian learns from her that Josh had been a Reaver, he attacks him and David and Sofia come to his defense. Rahne Sinclair returns to the school, free of her transformation powers, but more wild than before. Laurie Collins crush on Josh grows, but Josh's attention is interrupted by the arrival of Rahne. The students leave campus and discover the mutant Julian previously rejected may be involved in an electrical attack and robbery at the local coffee shop. Dani and Xi'an agree to look for her, but refuse to involve the students. Rahne feels this is a mistake and enlists them to find the girl first. Josh, David, Sofia, and Laurie leave with Rahne to find the girl. The team finds her buying drugs, but when they approach her, she pleads that she needs them to control her power. She losses control and injures some of the team. The students help to calm her and offer her the school's help. The girl, named Noriko, agrees. Back at Xavier's, Dani chastises Rahne for endangering her students, which Cyclops as headmaster, reinforces. Scott refuses her a teaching position and Rahne decides to leave the school after her visit. Josh befriends Rahne and a physical relationship results. Noriko gains gauntlets from Hank McCoy to help control her electrical emissions. David befriends her, but she is reluctant to befriend anyone. At Rahne's request, Josh heals Rahne, only for her to regain her powers and viciously attack Josh. Laurie discovers them and scares Rahne from the school. With Josh badly injured, Dani and Xi'an call another healer, Angel, for help, but he is hours away. David and Nori determine that Josh could heal himself if he were awake. Nori shocks him awake as David guides him to heal himself. As a result, Josh's skin and hair gain a reflective gold coloration. Rahne is tracked down by Dani and convinced to return to the school. Later, Dani convinces Noriko to work at the coffee shop to make amends and repay the money she had stolen.

=== X-Men Reload ===
New Mutants Vol.2 Issue #13

The Xavier school and much of New York has been attacked by mutant terrorist Magneto, leaving much in ruins. Former New Mutants Dani, Xi'an, and Rahne are assigned with shuttling the summer students to safety, thereby sitting out the encounter. Donald Pierce, leader of the Reavers, lies in prison awaiting execution, but is given an offer of leniency in exchange for information on Kevin Ford who previously attacked him in New York. During transport to his hearing, Pierce escapes. Many former New Mutants arrive at the school to assess the damage. The FBI inform the team that Pierce has escaped and will likely seek revenge against Kevin Ford or Josh Foley, the former Reaver who betrayed him. The students are hid away from the school grounds, but Josh Foley agrees to return to the school to try to draw Pierce to him. The plan works and as Pierce and his Reavers attack, the New Mutant team quickly jumps to the defense of the school; swiftly defeating Pierce. Their battle complete, Dani considers if her true calling should be as part of an X-Men team vs. remaining with the students.

== New Worlds ==
"New Worlds"
- Publisher: Marvel Comics
- Publication date: August – December 2002
- Genre: Superhero
- Title(s): New X-Men #127-133
- Main characters: List of X-Men members

Creative team
- Writer: Grant Morrison
- Penciller(s): John Paul Leon; Phil Jimenez
- Inker(s): Bill Sienkiewicz; Andy Lanning
- Letterer: Richard Starkings
- Colorist(s): Hi-Fi Design; Chris Chuckry; Dave McCaig
- New Worlds: ISBN 0-7851-0976-5

"New Worlds" was the third story arc from Grant Morrison's run on the Marvel Comics title New X-Men, running from issues #127-133. In the aftermath of both the Genoshan genocide and Cassandra Nova's revelation of Charles Xavier's mutant powers, as well as his school's function as a mutant haven, the X-Men must try to broker peace amidst rising human/mutant tensions, while still combating the mutant threats arising worldwide. This story arc not only dealt with the fallout of Genosha's destruction, but also began the psychic relationship shared by Cyclops and Emma Frost.

Major consequences:

- X-Corp is founded.
- Fantomex and Dust are introduced.
- Weapon X is retconned to be a division of Weapon Plus program.
- Darkstar is killed.
- Professor Xavier's marriage to Lilandra Neramani is annulled.
- Mutant Town, also known as District X, is introduced as a mutant ghetto in New York City. This would later become the setting for District X, a short-lived comic series.

== New X-Men: Academy X ==
=== Choosing Sides ===
Academy X Issues #1-6

=== Haunted ===
Academy X Issues #7-11

The students begin to notice mysterious events around the Xavier school. Several students begin encountering haunting voices, the movement and disappearance of items, and other mischievous behavior. The voices keep telling the students that they should leave the school. While many think the pranks are due to a prankster using his mutant powers, after a particularly dangerous encounter in the Danger Room with the students, Dani realizes that the entity might actually be a ghost and she and the students investigate further.

Elsewhere, many of the team leaders enroll in Scott Summers' tactical leadership class. Julian demoralizes David in front of the class by indicating that his power to temporarily absorb knowledge is insignificant in a tactical environment. Scott mentions that David's ability to learn the tactics of his opponents could be very valuable for a field leader, but David still feels inadequate. David approaches Emma Frost to help him learn why he is not able to retain any of the knowledge he gains. Emma informs him that his mind has set up blocks as a safety mechanism. With the help of his Emma and his adviser Dani, David explores having Emma remove the blocks so that he may retain the knowledge he absorbs.

=== X-Posed ===
Academy X Issues #12-15

The student squads compete for the Prizegiving awards as a damaging secret becomes known to the school. The students are affected to various degrees, and one of the faculty, Rahne, leaves the school as a result. As the staff struggle to adjust to this ordeal, another more dangerous issue threatens the school; a mind-controlled Wolverine is lose on the grounds. All the available X-Men, and even a team of Avengers, are called in to capture him; but one of the X-Men, Northstar, is killed in the pursuit. Too add further insult to injury, Northstar's body is captured by the Hand before it can be buried. Not wanting to worry the students further, Scott and Emma decide that the planned memorial for Northstar will proceed without his body to allow the students some closure.

Toward the end of the school year, the faculty begin preparing for the school's spring dance. Xi'an and Dani struggle with the extra burden of covering for the absent faculty. For the students, anxiety runs high as each of them ponders if they will be asked to the dance by one of their classmates. The dance goes off with several hitches among the students, but is for the most part uneventful. The following day, the X-Men are called away by The Avengers on important business, and Dani is left to perform the Prizegiving ceremony alone. Near the completion of the ceremony, the Blob crashes into the school. Upset about not being invited into the new Brotherhood of Mutants, he intends to attack the X-Men single-handedly to make a name for himself. With the X-Men away, and only Dani and Amara to protect the school, several New Mutants and Hellions join the fray to help defeat Blob.

As the school year ends, Sofia gathers the New Mutants together for a team camp-out by the lake to get them to air out their differences and to re-bond together as a team.

=== House of M ===
Academy X Issues #16-19

== New X-Men: Hellions ==
Hellions Issues #1-4

== New X-Men ==
=== Childhood's End ===
Issues #20-23

As a result of the Decimation event, in which the Scarlet Witch's magic de-powered most of the mutant population, only 27 of the 182 students enrolled at the Xavier Institute still retain their powers, and the comic changed its name to simply New X-Men. In response to the increasingly desperate situation that mutants now faced, Emma Frost has disbanded all the former training squads and integrated those students she deemed capable of combat, including new addition X-23, to a new team.

=== Crusade ===
Issues #24-27

Forty-two of the de-powered students are killed in an attack by anti-mutant fanatic, Reverend William Stryker. Icarus is misled by Stryker into allowing his wings to be amputated, and is later killed by Stryker after serving his purpose. A sniper working for Stryker kills Wallflower. Elixir, who had a romantic relationship with Wallflower and witnessed her death, kills Stryker and is reduced to a comatose state.

=== Nimrod ===
Issues #28-32

The X-Men receive a distress call from Forge, who was forced to repair the mutant-hunting Nimrod. The New X-Men go there to help, but are barely able to damage Nimrod. Rockslide is reduced to dust but soon reconstitutes himself in a stronger form, while Hellion lets Emma Frost release a formerly untapped potential of his mental powers. Through a trick, Nimrod is sent back in time.

=== Mercury Falling ===
Issues #33-36

Former New Mutants and Hellion squad member Wither is living in Mutant Town with a strange woman who is revealed to be Selene, the Black Queen, who seduces him into using his powers to kill. Back at the mansion, a memorial is held to honor all the X-Men and students who have perished.

Mercury is captured by Kimura. She is experimented on and tortured by scientists who use her living mercury to create a skin for a mutant-hunting creature called Predator X. The New X-Men and some of the Astonishing X-Men, including Emma Frost, arrive to rescue Mercury.

=== Quest for Magik ===
Issues #37-41

The Institute students are transported from the school into Limbo by Belasco. He tortures several of the students, questioning them on the whereabouts of Illyana Rasputin. The few students who evaded Belasco's capture, including Blindfold, Rockslide, Anole, and Pixie, are attacked by a group of Belasco's monsters, but are rescued by Illyana who offers her help. Illyana reveals that she can defeat Belasco with her Soulsword, but having lost her own, she persuades Pixie to allow her to create a new one from her soul. Illyana tells the students that Pixie, who now wields a "soul dagger" created from a portion of her soul, is the key to stopping Belasco. Pixie kills Belasco with her dagger, losing more of her innocence. Illyana attempts to steal the rest of Pixie's soul, but memories of her past self come back when Colossus speaks to her. She sends the X-Men and students home, then retakes the throne of Limbo. At the institute, Anole and Pixie are made members of the New X-Men.

=== Children of X-Men ===
Issues #42-43

At the Xavier Institute, the New X-Men and students recover from their recent battles. Rockslide learns that he is a psionic entity who draws from the earth to create a golem-like body. Surge kisses Hellion as a means of driving Prodigy away from the danger that seems to surround the team. This pushes David to allow the Stepford Cuckoos to unlock the psychic barriers in his mind that prevented him from remembering all of the information he had absorbed as a mutant; he also ends his relationship with Surge. Elixir slips into a depression because of the overwhelming potential of his powers, and while he is shaken out of it by Loa's advances, the Institute staff fear that he could become "the next Magneto."

Meanwhile, the Purifiers, now led by Matthew Risman, lure Predator X into pursuing Dust, causing it to change direction towards Alaska.

=== Messiah Complex ===
Issues #44-46

Following the detection of a new mutant in Alaska, Cyclops tells the new X-Men that they are being held back from action. Disobeying his orders, several of the New X-Men, confront the Purifiers in Washington. As they're engaged in combat with them, Lady Deathstrike and her Reavers appear, and badly wound Hellion. They manage to escape due to the intervention of the undercover Rictor. Returning to the mansion for medical help, the students come under attack from Predator X, who had been feasting on the remains of the students buried on the grounds. Confronted by Armor and Gentle, they try to keep the monster back from the medical bay. Pixie remembers that X-23 was able to kill one of the Predators in their first encounter and attempts to teleport it to Laura. However, her spell misfires and she teleports all the present students, Predator X, Beast and Nightcrawler to Muir Island, where X-23 and the rest of X-Force and the X-Men were in battle with the Marauders. During the final battle, Cyclops pits the New X-Men against the Marauders, realising the team would be unfamiliar with the abilities of the students. The resulting fight goes to plan, Pixie stabbing the Malice-possessed Omega Sentinel and Dust attacking Exodus internally while Emma Frost distracts him with a telepathic battle.

== See also ==
- Young X-Men
