= New X-Men (2004 series) =

2004-2008 comic book series

- The New X-Men in X-Men: Messiah Complex. Art by Humberto Ramos. From left to right: Elixir, Hellion, Dust, Gentle, Rockslide, Prodigy, Anole, Surge, Pixie, Mercury, X-23.

Publication information
- Publisher: Marvel Comics
- Schedule: Monthly
- Format: Ongoing series
- Publication date: July 2004 – March 2008
- No. of issues: 46 (List of story arcs)
- Main character(s): New Mutants; Hellions; Danielle Moonstar; Emma Frost

Creative team as of June 2007
- Created by: Nunzio DeFilippis; Christina Weir; Michael Ryan
- Written by: Craig Kyle; Christopher Yost
- Artist(s): Randy Green; Michael Ryan; Paco Medina; Mark Brooks; Skottie Young; Humberto Ramos
- Colorist: Jean-Francois Beaulieu

New X-Men is a superhero comic book series published by Marvel Comics within the X-Men franchise.

After the end of Grant Morrison's run on X-Men vol. 2 (titled New X-Men) the title was used for a new series, New X-Men: Academy X during the X-Men Reload event. The title was later shortened to simply New X-Men in 2006 when the new creative team of Craig Kyle and Christopher Yost took over the series with issue #20.

Whereas most other X-Men comics mostly deal with established adult mutants, this series concentrates on the lives of young students residing at the Xavier Institute for Higher Learning as they learn to control their powers.

After the 2007 crossover X-Men: Messiah Complex, the New X-Men title was canceled and briefly relaunched as Young X-Men for 12 issues. The series was written by Marc Guggenheim. After the first arc of Young X-Men, the characters began appearing in the pages of Uncanny X-Men. With the cancellation of Young X-Men the characters were folded onto the main X-Men books, appearing most prominently in the pages of X-Men: Legacy, Wolverine and the X-Men, and X-Men.

== Founding ==
New X-Men begins where Grant Morrison's run on the former New X-Men ended. The school is rebuilt and Emma Frost and Cyclops are named the headmasters. They organize the students into several battle squads who train together.

The series focuses chiefly on two rival teams: the New Mutants, whose mentor is Danielle Moonstar, and the Hellions, whose mentor is Emma Frost.

=== New Mutants squad ===
The New Mutants squad's tutor is Danielle Moonstar. It is co-led by Wind Dancer and Prodigy.

- Elixir (Josh Foley) - Foley is able to manipulate biological matter, which allows him to both heal and kill others with a touch. He was a member of the Reavers, an anti-mutant group, but left after learning that he was a mutant.
- Icarus (Joshua "Jay" Guthrie) - Guthrie has red feathered wings that allow him to fly and give him a healing factor. Following the events of "M-Day", William Stryker tricks Guthrie into having his wings amputated, then kills him.
- Prodigy (David Alleyne) - Alleyne takes on the knowledge and skills of nearby people. After being depowered, Alleyne regained the knowledge and talents he had acquired before "M-Day".
- Surge (Noriko Ashida) - Ashida is a Japanese immigrant who constantly absorbs static electricity and can discharge the electricity as electric blasts or channel it to gain superhuman speed. Ashida initially used illegal drugs to control her powers; after she joins the X-Men, she receives specialized gauntlets created by Beast as an alternative.
- Wallflower (Laurie Collins) - Collins exudes pheromones that alter the feelings of other people. She is killed in issue #25 by the Purifiers.
- Wind Dancer (Sofia Mantega) - Mantega can control air particles, allowing her to fly and hear distant conversations. Wind Dancer lost her powers during "M-Day" and went on to join a short-lived incarnation of the New Warriors.
- Wither (Kevin Ford) - Ford is a member of the New Mutants for a short time before switching to the Hellions.

=== Hellions squad ===
The Hellions squad's tutor is Emma Frost. It is led by Hellion.

- Dust (Sooraya Qadir) - Qadir is a shy girl from Afghanistan who can turn herself into a living whirlwind of dust. She joins the X-Men and is a student at the Jean Grey School for Higher Learning.
- Hellion (Julian Keller) - Keller is a mutant with the power of telekinesis. He joins the X-Men and is a student at the Jean Grey School for Higher Learning.
- Icarus (Joshua "Jay" Guthrie) - Guthrie is a member of the Hellions for a short time before switching to the New Mutants.
- Mercury (Cessily Kincaid) - Kincaid is a shapeshifter whose body is composed of non-toxic liquid mercury. She joins the X-Men and is a student at the Jean Grey School for Higher Learning.
- Rockslide (Santo Vaccarro) - Vaccarro is able to manifest a physical body made of solid rock from the immediate environment and launch limbs at great velocity. He joins the X-Men and is a student at the Jean Grey School for Higher Learning.
- Specter (Dallas Gibson) - Gibson is a member for a brief time before being reassigned to the Corsairs squad.
- Tag (Brian Cruz) - Cruz can psionically "tag" a person so that others are compelled to run from or toward them. He is killed on the bus ambushed by the Purifiers along with several other depowered mutants.
- Wither (Kevin Ford) - Ford can destroy organic matter with a touch. He is romantic rivals with Elixir for Wallflower. When Wallflower dies, Wither flees the school and becomes Selene's second-in-command. He is killed by Elixir during the "Necrosha" storyline.

=== Other squads ===
- The Advocates squad leader is Rogue. This squad consists of:
  - Boggart (Robin Wise) - Wise possesses superhuman strength and green skin. He is depowered during "M-Day".
  - Naiad (Aurelie Sabayon) - Sabayon has the ability to breathe underwater. She is depowered during "M-Day".
  - Pinpoint (Gerard Cooper) - Cooper possesses telescopic vision. He is depowered during "M-Day".
  - Trovão (Pedro de Noli) - De Noli has the ability to create sonic booms. He is depowered during "M-Day".
  - Umbra (Patrick Nesbitt) - Nesbitt has the ability to manipulate darkness. He is depowered during "M-Day".
  - Xenon (Shaun Kennedy) - Kennedy has the ability to generate light. He is depowered during "M-Day".
- The Alpha Squadron squad leader is initially Northstar (Jean-Paul Beaubier), but he is later replaced by Karma. The squad consists of:
  - Anole (Victor Borkowski) - Borkowski has reptilian mutations that give him enhanced strength, speed, durability, reflexes and stamina. He also has a prehensile tongue, wall crawling abilities, the ability to blend into his environment and regenerative powers. He joins the X-Men and is a student at the Jean Grey School for Higher Learning.
  - Indra (Paras Gavaskar) - Gavaskar can create a psionic exoskeleton and weapons from his skin. He is the youngest mutant at the school. He joins the X-Men and is a student at the Jean Grey School for Higher Learning.
  - Kidogo (Lazaro Kotikash) - Kotikash can shrink to four inches tall. He is depowered as a result of "M-Day".
  - Loa (Alani Ryan) - Ryan can disintegrate matter by phasing through it. She is enrolled at the Avengers Academy.
  - Network (Sarah Vale) - Vale has the ability to communicate with machinery. She is depowered during "M-Day" and killed on the bus ambushed by the Purifiers along with several other depowered mutants.
  - Rubbermaid (Andrea Margulies) - Margulies can turn her body into a rubber-like substance. She is depowered during "M-Day" and killed on the bus ambushed by the Purifiers along with several other depowered mutants.
- The Chevaliers squad leader is Gambit. This squad is introduced in X-Men vol. 2, #171. The squad consists of:
  - Bling! (Roxanne Washington) - Washington possesses diamond-like skin that she can expel shards from. She joins the X-Men and is a student at the Jean Grey School for Higher Learning.
  - Flubber (Nick Shelley) - Shelley's body is made of a rubbery substance. This grants him great strength and the ability to leap great distances. He is depowered during "M-Day".
  - Foxx (Raven Darkholme) - Darkholme has the ability to shapeshift. She uses the alias of Foxx to infiltrate the X-Men, claiming later that she was testing Gambit's commitment to Rogue. She becomes an instructor at the Hellfire Academy and the leader of the Brotherhood of Mutants.
  - Onyxx (Sidney Green) - Green's body is made of a rock-like substance that gives him superhuman strength and durability. He is killed by Wither during the events of "Necrosha".
  - Rain Boy (Carl Aalston) - Aalston's body is living water that is held together by a containment suit.
- The Corsairs squad leader is Cyclops. The squad consists of:
  - Dryad (Callie Betto) - Betto can communicate with and control plant life. She is depowered during "M-Day" and killed on the bus ambushed by the Purifiers along with several other depowered mutants.
  - Quill (Max Jordan) - Jordan's body is covered with quills, which he can fire as projectiles. He is shot and killed by one of Stryker's Purifiers when the mansion is attacked.
  - Specter (Dallas Gibson) - Gibson possesses a living shadow that he can merge with, gaining superhuman strength, speed and durability. He is depowered during "M-iDay".
  - Three-In-One (Celeste, Mindee and Phoebe Cuckoo) - The Cuckoo sisters are able to combine their telepathic abilities and they possess the ability to transform into an organic diamond form. They join the Extinction Team as students of the New Charles Xavier School for Mutants.
- The Paladins squad leader is Kitty Pryde. The members that are named are:
  - Armor (Hisako Ichiki) - Ichiki has the ability to create a psionic exoskeleton. She joins the X-Men and is a student at the Jean Grey School for Higher Learning.
  - Blindfold (Ruth Aldine) - Aldine possesses telepathy, the ability to see the future as well as the past, and clairvoyance. She joins the X-Men and is a student at the Jean Grey School for Higher Learning.
  - Wing (Edward Tancredi) - Powers neutralized by Ord; he committed suicide afterward in the Danger Room.
- The Paragons squad leader is originally Rahne Sinclair, who is replaced by Magma (Amara Aquilla). The squad consists of:
  - DJ (Mark Sheppard) - Sheppard changes music into energy blasts, blinding lights, flight or a force field. The style of music determines the ability. He is depowered during "M-Day" and killed on the bus ambushed by the Purifiers along with several other depowered mutants.
  - Match (Ben Hammil) - Hammil has the ability to create and control fire. He joins the X-Men and is a student at the Jean Grey School for Higher Learning, serving as the leader of the Paragons.
  - Pixie (Megan Gwynn) - Gwynn is a hybrid mutant and fairy. She can fly and her wings create a hallucinogenic dust. She also has magical powers. She joins the X-Men and is a student at the Jean Grey School for Higher Learning.
  - Trance (Hope Abbott) - Abbott has the ability to create an astral projection of herself. This form is capable of flight and producing energy blasts. She joins the X-Men and is a student at the Jean Grey School for Higher Learning.
  - Wolf Cub (Nicholas "Nick" Gleason) - Gleason has a wolf-like body that gives him enhanced strength, senses, speed, agility and endurance. He also has razor-sharp claws. He is killed by Donald Pierce.
  - Preview (Jessica Vale) - Vale has the ability to see minutes into the future. She is depowered during "M-Day". She is Network's sister.

The Excelsiors, led by Iceman, are mentioned but the members are never named. The Exemplars, led by Beast, are unknown as well with the exception of Angel Salvadore. Storm's squad, mentioned in New X-Men, has one known member: Gentle.

== Decimation ==
In the aftermath of the Decimation event known as M-Day, the mutant student body in the academy dropped from 182 to 27. At least 45 depowered students were killed and, of the remaining students, Emma Frost picked a select group to train as New X-Men. These new X-Men were Dust, Elixir, Hellion, Mercury, Rockslide, Surge (appointed leader), and X-23. As time progressed, several members were added or earned the right to be on the team, such as Anole, Gentle, Pixie, and Prodigy. The rest of the students were instructed to remain on school grounds, some providing assistance to the current X-Men teams and trainees. Some M-Day survivors and depowered students either left the mansion or died during villainous attacks by William Stryker and other enemies. Many of the students who were killed were resurrected during the Krakoan Age.

== Young X-Men ==
The Young X-Men series launched as part of the X-Men storyline "Divided We Stand" in April, 2008. Written by Marc Guggenheim and pencilled by Yanick Paquette, it featured a line-up of Blindfold, Dust, Rockslide, Wolf Cub, and three new characters: Graymalkin, Ink, and Cipher. The first arc involved the group being formed by Donald Pierce, who thanks to changes inflicted upon him by the Purifiers, impersonates Cyclops as part of an elaborate plot to kill the young mutants who he sees are the last generation of mutants born prior to M-Day. The group are manipulated into fighting members of the New Mutants before Pierce is ultimately exposed. In the end, per Blindfold's prediction at the start of the series, Donald Pierce murders Wolf Cub before being captured by the group and taken into custody by the X-Men.

When the X-Men franchise is relaunched with the relocation of the X-Men to San Francisco following the events in Uncanny X-Men, the characters relocate to California. The series is ultimately canceled with issue #12 and many events of the series (such as Dust being mortally wounded during the team's fight with the New Mutants) would be ignored by later writers.

== X-Men: Legacy, X-Force and Wolverine and the X-Men ==
Most of the characters (most notably Pixie, who was granted full X-Men membership) appear sporadically following the events of Uncanny X-Men #500 and the cancellation of Young X-Men. Elixir and X-23 are incorporated into the roster of a new X-Force series. The characters are ultimately given a new home in the pages of X-Men: Legacy, written by Mike Carey starting with X-Men: Legacy #226. Now a loose collection of students, the kids are led by Rogue, who serves as the team's teacher. Following the events of X-Men: Schism, many of the New X-Men members follow Wolverine back East as he reopens the Xavier Institute as a school and sanctuary for young mutants named the Jean Grey School for Higher Learning. As of X-Men: Regenesis, several additional X-Men join Rogue and Wolverine in serving as teachers for the young mutants: Cannonball, Gambit, Rachel Grey, Husk, and Shadowcat. The group has also accepted non-mutant members, such as Broo (a pacifistic Brood hatchling) and Kid Gladiator, the son of X-Men enemy Gladiator. Another member of the student body is Kid Omega, whose involvement with the school is involuntary in an effort to reform him.

== Contributors ==
Issue(s)	Writer(s)	Artist(s)
As New X-Men: Academy X
1-2	Nunzio DeFilippis, Christina Weir	Randy Green
3-4	Nunzio DeFilippis, Christina Weir	Staz Johnson
5-8	Nunzio DeFilippis, Christina Weir	Michael Ryan
9	Nunzio DeFilippis, Christina Weir	Carlo Pagulayan
10-11	Nunzio DeFilippis, Christina Weir	Paco Medina
12-13	Nunzio DeFilippis, Christina Weir	Michael Ryan
14-15	Nunzio DeFilippis, Christina Weir	Paco Medina
16-19 "House of M"	Nunzio DeFilippis, Christina Weir	Aaron Lopresti
As New X-Men
20-23	Craig Kyle, Christopher Yost	Mark Brooks (Issue #23 with Paul Pelletier)
24-28	Craig Kyle, Christopher Yost	Paco Medina
29	Craig Kyle, Christopher Yost	Duncan Rouleau
30-31	Craig Kyle, Christopher Yost	Paco Medina
32	Craig Kyle, Christopher Yost	Mike Norton
33-37	Craig Kyle, Christopher Yost	Paco Medina (Issue #37 with Skottie Young, Niko Henrichon)
38-43	Craig Kyle, Christopher Yost	Skottie Young
44-46 '"Messiah Complex"	Craig Kyle, Christopher Yost	Humberto Ramos
New X-Men: Hellions (related reading)
1-4	Nunzio DeFilippis, Christina Weir	Clayton Henry

== Collected editions ==
=== Trade paperbacks ===
Title	Material collected	Publication date	ISBN
New Mutants Vol. 1: Back to School	New Mutants (vol. 2) #1-6	March 2005	0-7851-1242-1
New Mutants: Back to School - Complete Collection	New Mutants, vol. 2 #1–13; X-Men Unlimited #42-43	January 2018	978-1302915681
New X-Men: Academy X - Complete Collection	New X-Men: Academy X #1–15; New X-Men: Academy X Yearbook #1; New X-Men: Hellions #1–4;	December 2018	978-1302910327
New X-Men Childhood's End - Complete Collection	New X-Men #16-32	January 2019	978-1302913847
New X-Men Quest for Magik - Complete Collection	New X-Men (2004) 33-39, 40-42 (A Stories), 43; X-Infernus 1-4, Saga; material from X-Men Unlimited (2004) 14; X-Men: Divided We Stand 2	July 2019	978-1302918378
New X-Men: Academy X Vol. 1: Choosing Sides	New X-Men: Academy X #1-6	January 2005	0-7851-1538-2
New X-Men: Academy X Vol. 2: Haunted	New X-Men: Academy X #7-11	July 2005	0-7851-1615-X
New X-Men: Hellions	New X-Men: Hellions #1-4	November 2005	0-7851-1746-6
New X-Men: Academy X Vol. 3: X-Posed	New X-Men: Academy X #12-15, New X-Men: Academy X Yearbook	January 2006	0-7851-1791-1
House of M: New X-Men	New X-Men: Academy X #16-19, Secrets of the House of M	March 2006	0-7851-1941-8
New X-Men: Childhood's End, Vol. 1	New X-Men #20-23	May 2006	0-7851-1831-4
New X-Men: Childhood's End, Vol. 2: Crusade	New X-Men #24-27	August 2006	0-7851-2024-6
New X-Men: Childhood's End, Vol. 3: Nimrod	New X-Men #28-32	December 2006	0-7851-2025-4
New X-Men: Childhood's End, Vol. 4: Mercury Falling	New X-Men #33-36	June 2007	0-7851-2238-9
New X-Men: Childhood's End, Vol. 5: Quest for Magik	New X-Men #37-43	December 2007	0-7851-2239-7
X-Men: Messiah Complex	X-Men: Messiah CompleX one-shot, Uncanny X-Men #492-494, X-Men #205-207, New X-Men #44-46, X-Factor #25-27, X-Men: Messiah CompleX - Mutant Files	November 2008	0-7851-2320-2

=== Hardcovers ===
Title	Material collected	Publication date	ISBN
X-Men: Messiah Complex	X-Men: Messiah Complex one-shot, Uncanny X-Men #492-494, X-Men #205-207, New X-Men #44-46, X-Factor #25-27	April 2008	0-7851-2899-9
