= X-Men: Reload =

Marvel Comics revamp of the X-Men

- Promotional art for the X-Men: Reload event

Publication information
- Publisher: Marvel Comics
- Genre: Superhero
- Publication date: May 2004
- Main character(s): X-Men

Creative team
- Writer(s): Chuck Austen; Chris Claremont; Joss Whedon
- Artist(s): John Cassaday; Alan Davis; Salvador Larroca

X-Men: Reload was the name given by Marvel Comics to their May 2004 revamp of the X-Men titles with new looks for the characters and fresh plot points. The revamp was prompted by Grant Morrison's departure from New X-Men.

As a result of the revamp, Chris Claremont moved from writing X-Treme X-Men to writing Uncanny X-Men, with Alan Davis doing the art. Chuck Austen moved from writing Uncanny X-Men to New X-Men, which returned to its old name of simply X-Men, with Salvador Larroca, who had been working with him on Uncanny X-Men doing the art. Finally, Joss Whedon entered as the writer of the new title Astonishing X-Men, with John Cassaday as artist. X-Treme X-Men was cancelled. The X-Men returned to more traditional (if not slightly revised) costumes, as opposed to the black leather uniforms of the X-Men films.

In addition to this reshuffle of the main titles, many of the secondary X-Men books were given new writers as well.

== Publication history ==
The "post-Morrison" period that was known as the ReLoad event began when Grant Morrison's run for writing New X-Men ended and X-Treme X-Men was canceled. Chris Claremont who was writing X-Treme at that time was then returned to writing Uncanny X-Men, the title that he was famous for penning throughout the majority of the 1970s and 1980s. After Grant Morrison stepped down from writing New X-Men, the title was changed back to simply X-Men and continued with its numbering instead of restarting as issue #1. The three main X-Men team books consisted of the aforementioned X-Men, Astonishing X-Men, and Uncanny X-Men with the three main teams being led by Havok, Cyclops, and Storm respectively. Many individual X-Men characters received their own solo series as part of this event, but few lasted beyond twelve issues and many of the solo titles were cancelled after only a few issues due to poor sales. Astonishing X-Men proved to be the most popular and highest selling X-Men title at that time and received strong reviews from fans and critics alike for its artwork, pacing, and writing. Astonishing X-Men became so popular that it was the only X-book at that time to receive spin-off series like X-Men: Phoenix - Endsong and an origin series for Colossus.

Many then-current titles were changed to fit with the revamp and along with that many titles were also cancelled to make way for new x-books. Some of the titles that were cancelled included volume 2 of New Mutants to make room for a new series focused on the newest generation of X-Men students called New X-Men. X-Treme X-Men was also cancelled and saw Storm bringing her team to work as the X.S.E. under a United Nations charter. X-Statix was cancelled to make room for District X, which saw Bishop policing a troubled mutant community in New York City. The series Agent X and Soldier X were both cancelled to provide room for the new series Cable & Deadpool. District X, Madrox, and new issues of Wolverine were re-branded as part of the Marvel Knights collection. The status-quo that was established in this event remained for a year until the House of M crossover event in 2005 drastically changed the tone of all X-books by having the majority of the world's mutants de-powered.

== Notable changes ==
Many characters and story arcs entered a new direction as part of the ReLoad event. Some of the most notable changes that had the most impact were the X-Treme Sanctions Executive moving to the newly rebuilt X-Mansion as their main headquarters, the Danger Room gaining sentience, Rogue learning her real name, Kitty Pryde returning to the X-Men full-time, Cyclops and Emma Frost becoming co-headmasters of the Xavier Institute, Colossus and Psylocke being resurrected, Professor X leaving the X-Men in hopes of rebuilding Genosha alongside Magneto, the real Xorn resurfacing, S.W.O.R.D.being introduced, and X-23 joining the X-Men.

== Titles involved ==
Astonishing X-Men: volume 3, #1
District X: volume 1, #1
Excalibur: volume 3, #1
Gambit: volume 2, #1
Madrox: volume 1, #1
Jubilee: volume 1, #1
New X-Men: volume 2, #1
Nightcrawler: volume 3: #1
Rogue: volume 3, #1
Uncanny X-Men: volume 1, #444
Wolverine: volume 3, #20
X-Force: volume 2, #1
X-Men: volume 1, #157
