= Alpha squadron =

Alpha squadron may refer to:

- Alpha Squadron (comics), a fictional team of mutants appearing in Marvel comic books
- a military squadron of the fictional Terran Confederacy in the StarCraft series
