= X-Men: Eve of Destruction =

Marvel Comics storyline

"Eve of Destruction"
- Cover of The Uncanny X-Men 393 (Nov 2001), art by Ian Churchill
- Publisher: Marvel Comics
- Publication date: March – June 2001
- Genre: Superhero; Crossover
Title(s)
The Uncanny X-Men #392-393
X-Men vol. 2, #110-113

Creative team
- Writer: Scott Lobdell
- Penciller(s): Leinil Francis Yu; Salvador Larroca; Tom Raney
- Inker(s): Mark Morales; Gerry Alanguilan; Edgar Tadeo; Dexter Vines; Scott Hanna; Tim Townsend
- Letterer(s): Richard Starkings; Comicraft

"Eve of Destruction" is an X-Men crossover storyline in the fictional Marvel Comics Universe. The storyline was written by Scott Lobdell and features artwork from Leinil Francis Yu, Salvador Larroca, and Tom Raney.

The storyline was part of a four-month period in 2001 on the two core X-Men books, as former X-Men writer Lobdell was brought back to wrap up the unresolved plotline of the Legacy Virus while Marvel planned the arrival of Grant Morrison and Joe Casey as writers for the main two X-Men books. After this story, it would be several years before Uncanny X-Men and X-Men crossed over with each other.

== Synopsis ==
After Colossus sacrifices himself to cure the Legacy Virus, Magneto becomes obsessed with the death of the X-Men and what he felt was Xavier's inability to keep Colossus (who had lost his family due to the Legacy Virus and anti-mutant forces) from dying for the sake of mutantkind.

Magneto attacks the X-Mansion, kidnapping Xavier and taking him to Genosha, where he crucifies his former friend and places a device on Xavier's skull that neutralizes his powers. He then begins a ruthless campaign of recruiting mutants for Genosha's armies. Magneto also agrees to let reporter Trish Tilby visit Genosha. During a one-on-one interview, Magneto announces that with Genosha free of the taint of the Legacy Virus, that the country will begin taking action to secure the planet for mutants. He dares humanity to attack his country pre-emptively.

Magneto's actions come as the X-Men are at their weakest point in terms of strength. Storm, Beast, Rogue, Psylocke, Sage, Bishop, and Thunderbird have left the United States to find the diaries of Rogue's foster mother Irene Adler (the precognitive mutant Destiny). With Cable and Shadowcat retired and Angel on a leave of absence, only Jean Grey, Wolverine, and Cyclops are left to deal with Magneto's latest power play and the kidnapping of Charles Xavier.

While Wolverine and Cyclops sneak into Genosha to help Polaris with getting Genoshan humans to safety, Jean Grey gathers a varied team of mutants. Two are neophyte civilians code-named Omerta and Wraith. Jean recruits Alpha Flight member Northstar and the mutant strong-woman and Magneto supporter Joanna Cargill, who Jean brainwashes into becoming an X-Man. Sunpyre, a stranger to Jean, appears instead of the expected help of Sunfire. The situation is so extreme Jean accepts her help anyway. Omerta and Northstar come to blows, as Omerta is prejudiced against Northstar's homosexuality.

As the group prepares to fly to Genosha, they are joined by former X-Man Dazzler. In a telepathic conference involving the entire team, it is learned Dazzler has come seeking the X-Men's help, as the Mojoverse has been conquered by X-Baby versions of Apocalypse and his Horsemen. Dazzler tells Jean that Apocalypse has killed Mojo and Longshot and all but decimated the Mojoverse, but she is willing to put aside the problem to help the X-Men fight Magneto. Meanwhile, Amelia Voght, a former friend of Xavier turned follower of Magneto, begins to fear for Genosha's future if Magneto's new aggressive foreign policy brings forth a global human-mutant war.

The makeshift X-Men are attacked by Magneto as they reach Genosha, as their plane is destroyed and they are magnetically lowered to Magda Square, an arena Magneto has set up for the inevitable showdown. Showing off the crucified Xavier, Magneto is attacked by Dazzler, who Magneto disintegrates with an electromagnetic energy blast.

This leads to a full-on battle with the makeshift X-Men and Magneto, as Cyclops and Wolverine join the battle. Wolverine's arrival leads to Magneto overpowering the clawed mutant and proclaiming that he is going to remove the adamantium from his skeleton again but to his horror, he finds himself unable to do so.

At this point, Xavier reveals himself and explains that Amelia Voght freed him from the cross at the start of the battle and with Jean Grey running telepathic interference, had Dazzler use her powers to create a hologram of herself (which was what Magneto "destroyed") while she took Xavier's place on the cross, using her hologram powers to impersonate Xavier.

Magneto realizes that the X-Men have outsmarted him but remains defiant in regards to his plans to militarize Genosha and turn the country into an aggressive global super-power in the name of mutants everywhere. Wolverine responds by stabbing Magneto in the guts, as the X-Men leave Magneto bleeding on the ground.

Returning home, the neophyte X-Men leave and Dazzler, for reasons unknown, declines to stay and prepare with the X-Men to free the Mojoverse from Apocalypse's control. Alone in the X-Mansion, Jean Grey, Cyclops, and Professor Xavier take up Wolverine's offer for a drink to celebrate their victory.

== Reading order ==
- X-Men #110
- X-Men #111
- Uncanny X-Men #392
- X-Men #112
- Uncanny X-Men #393
- X-Men #113
