= Children of the Vault =

Fictional species in Marvel comics

- The Children of the Vault, from left to right: Perro, Aguja, Sangre, Fuego, and Serafina. Art by Chris Bachalo

Publication information
- Publisher: Marvel Comics
- First appearance: X-Men (vol. 2) #188 (September 2006)
- Created by: Mike Carey; Chris Bachalo

Characteristics
- Place of origin: The Corridor
- Notable members: Sangre; Serafina; Perro; Fuego; Aguja; Cadena; Corregidora; Martillo; Luz
- Inherent abilities: Varies

The Children of the Vault are a group of fictional superhuman beings appearing in American comic books published by Marvel Comics. Created by Mike Carey and Chris Bachalo, the Children of the Vault debuted in X-Men (vol. 2) #188 (September 2006). They are primarily antagonists of the X-Men.

The Children of the Vault were raised in a closed vault aboard a cargo ship, where temporal acceleration technology was used to evolve individuals into super-powered beings. Due to genetic drift, they are a separate species from both baseline humans and mutants. Their goal is to exterminate both humans and mutants in order to take over the Earth.

== Fictional team biography ==
=== Origin ===
The Children of the Vault are an artificial species raised over the course of 6,000 years inside a time-accelerated ship off the coast of Peru. The ship was designed to stay sealed until the planet was empty for the Children to take over. However, the energy discharge caused by the events of "Decimation" caused their vault to open early. The emerging species has highly developed superpowers and technology.

=== Supernovas ===
While pursuing Sabretooth, the Children destroy a town in Nogales, Mexico, framing the X-Men for the disaster. Two others ambush Sabretooth, who escapes and seeks help from the X-Men. The Children of the Vault next capture Northstar from a S.H.I.E.L.D base, and later capture Aurora. Serafina doctors images of the X-Men into security footage, further discrediting the team.

The X-Men encounter the Children of the Vault in Mumbai while visiting Indra's family nearby. A rebellious young member of the Children, Luz, escapes from the group's headquarters and lands in Mumbai, where she encounters the X-Men. Rogue, believing Luz to be a mutant, offers her hospitality with Indra's family.

=== Dawn of X ===
The Children of the Vault reappear during the Dawn of X era of X-Men comics. Serafina is rescued from captivity by the X-Men, during a raid on a base of the X-Men's enemy Orchis. Later on, Darwin, Synch, and X-23 are tasked with infiltrating the Children's base of operations in Ecuador. The Children of the Vault are revealed to be the earliest members of the Post-Humans, better known as Homo Novissima, a race destined to depose both humans and mutants as the dominant species on Earth.

== Members ==
The Children of the Vault has approximately 3,000 members. Those known are:

- Sangre: The team leader, Sangre possesses a liquid body that gives him increased durability and the ability to manipulate water. He was killed by Mystique.
- Perro: He possesses superhuman strength, durability, and control over gravity. Perro is quite intelligent, despite his aggressive nature.
- Serafina: A technopath, Serafina can mechanically interface with machinery and other people, enhancing and controlling their powers. She has enhanced senses, differentiating between illusions and reality easily. She is also able to detect genetic and biochemical data down to the molecular level, making her an expert tracker. She can also manipulate bio-molecular ingredients to some degree.
- Aguja: Aguja can project energy blasts and force fields. During a battle against the X-Men, Lady Mastermind projects an illusion to make Aguja look like her, causing Fuego to mistakenly kill Aguja.
- Fuego: Has the appearance of a flaming skeleton. He possesses magma powers that are fueled by energy absorbed from his surroundings. Fuego was killed by Iceman.
- Cadena: The new leader of the Children after Sangre's apparent death. Cadena has a globe of electricity surrounding her head that she can manipulate into electrical chains.
- Luz: Luz can manipulate light, "painting" or shaping it into anything she wishes.
- Capitán: Capitán possesses optic blasts, superhuman strength, flight, and size alteration. He led a group known as the Traditionalists to oppose Serafina's New Way.
- Corregidora: Corregidora can implant suggestions into the minds of others with verbal spells. She operates the House of Corrections and wields a knife.
- Diamante: Diamante possesses photographic memory. His psyche remains the same across resurrections, making him the historian of the Vault.
- Horador: Teleportation.
- Madre: Madre possesses golden skin and hair. She watches over the Crèche, the location where Children of the Vault are reborn after death. Her existence is also inverted from the rest of the Children of the Vault; while they sleep, she works and vice versa.
- Martillo: Superhuman strength and resistance; wields a large hammer.
- Merbavon: Disruption powers, including barriers.
- Olvido: Able to take anything directed at him into what he calls "the void" and direct it back at his opponents in his own form of energy.
- Piedra Dura: Solid stone form, possessing no blood and enhanced mass and durability.
- Prisa: Superhuman speed and flight.
- Rana: She can physically merge with an opponent's body to either possess them or attack them from the inside.
- Terramot: Earth manipulation.
- Vacuna: Vacuna is a "chronal tunneler" with hyper-senses, able to travel to key points in history and destroy them. Vacuna is killed when Bishop and Cable trick him into destroying the point of his own creation.
