= Alpha Squadron (comics) =

Fictional team from Marvel Comics

- From left to right; Rubbermaid, Indra, Loa, Anole, Kidogo, Network, and Karma.

Publication information
- Publisher: Marvel Comics
- First appearance: New X-Men: Academy X #13 (July 2005)
- Created by: Nunzio DeFilippis; Christina Weir; Michael Ryan (artist)

In-story information
- Base(s): Xavier Institute for Higher Learning
- Member(s): Anole; Rubbermaid; Indra; Loa; Karma; Kidogo; Network; Northstar

Alpha Squadron was a fictional team of mutants appearing in American comic books published by Marvel Comics. The characters were featured in the comic book series New X-Men: Academy X, in the Marvel Universe.

== Fictional biography ==
Alpha Squadron was a squad of students instructed by members of the X-Men at Xavier Institute for Higher Learning. The squad’s colors are red, grey and black. Alpha Squadron was originally advised by Northstar, who named the group after his former team Alpha Flight. When Northstar was seemingly killed by Wolverine, the squad was assigned a new advisor, Karma.

=== Decimation ===
After M-Day, the Scarlet Witch depowered 90% of the mutant population. The Xavier Institute was affected a great deal, losing many of the students (dropped 182 to 27) and some X-Men. In the aftermath, the Alpha Squadron was disbanded along with other squads. Rubbermaid, Network, and Kidogo lost their powers while Anole, Indra and Loa retained their powers. Karma also retained her powers. Rubbermaid and Network died after being attacked by William Stryker, while Kidogo's status and whereabouts are unknown.

== Members ==
=== Anole ===
Anole (Victor Borkowski) was the field leader of Alpha Squadron and he is openly gay. He possesses a reptilian mutation that grants him a spiked head carapace, an elastic tongue, wall-crawling and adaptive camouflage; in addition, Victor possesses regenerative capabilities and enhanced physical skills. In New X-Men: Yearbook Special #1, he was voted as the best actor. Anole was one of the 27 students at the Xavier Institute to retain his powers after M-Day. He joined the X-Men training team New X-Men in New X-Men, vol. 2 #41.

=== Indra ===
Indra (Paras Gavaskar) is from India. The name Indra is based on the Hindu god of weather and war, and he is endowed with the ability to form protective armour around his body which shields him from physical harm. In New X-Men: Yearbook Special #1, he was voted as the most reliable. Indra was one of the 27 students at the Xavier Institute to retain his powers after M-Day. He became an X-Men trainee in X-Men: Legacy #238.

=== Kidogo ===
Kidogo (Lazaro Kotikash) is a Maasai and almost a head taller than anyone else on his team. He possessed the ability to shrink his entire body down to a height of four inches by displacing his mass extra dimensionally. In New X-Men: Yearbook Special #1, he was voted to have most ironic power. Kidogo was depowered after M-Day; however, he was not on the bus that got bombed by Stryker. His current status is unknown.

=== Loa ===
Loa (Alani Ryan) is Native Hawaiian. She possesses the ability to pass through solid material and disintegrate it. In New X-Men: Yearbook Special #1, she was voted as the most laid-back. Loa was one of the 27 students at the Xavier Institute to retain her powers after M-Day. She became an X-Men trainee in Runaways #10.

=== Network ===
Network (Sarah Vale) is Preview's sister. She possessed the ability to communicate with and manipulate machinery. This allowed to access computer files and manipulate programming to suit her needs among other things. In New X-Men: Yearbook Special #1, she was voted as the most likely to become a millionaire. Network was depowered after M-Day and she died on a bus that was attacked by William Stryker in New X-Men #23. She was resurrected on Krakoa.

=== Rubbermaid ===
Rubbermaid (Andrea Margulies) possessed an elastic and malleable body that allowed her to stretch any part of her anatomy to great lengths and absorb physical damage without injury. She was the youngest member of Alpha Squadron. In New X-Men: Yearbook Special #1, she was voted as the biggest gossip. Rubbermaid lost her powers after M-Day and she died on a bus that was attacked by William Stryker in New X-Men #23. She was resurrected on Krakoa.

== Reception ==
Nunzio DeFilippis and Christina Weir had stated that it was possible that Alpha Squadron had more queer members than other squads. They only made a decision on Anole's sexuality. Both of the squad's advisor Karma and Northstar are both homosexual. In Way of X #3, Loa and Mercury were pursuing each other intimately. Indra was also seen showing attraction to fellow Alpha Squadron member, Anole.
