= Karma (character) =

Marvel Comics superhero

- Variant cover of New Mutants (vol. 4) #27 (September 2022). Art by Betsy Cola.

Publication information
- Publisher: Marvel Comics
- First appearance: Marvel Team-Up #100 (December 1980)
- Created by: Chris Claremont; Frank Miller

In-story information
- Alter ego: Xuân Cao Mạnh
- Species: Human mutant
- Team affiliations: New Mutants; Xavier Institute; X-Men; Utopians; Tiger Division
- Notable aliases: Xi'an Coy Manh; Shan
- Abilities: Remote possession; Mental possession; Sensory scrying; Illusion casting; Psychic shield; Mind control; Telepathy; Firearm expert; Skilled martial artist

Karma (Xuân Cao Mạnh (Note: Alternately Mạnh Cao Xuân using Vietnamese naming order. Prior to Love Unlimited Infinity Comic #31 (January 2023), the character's name was spelled as Xi’an Coy Manh.)) is a character appearing in American comic books published by Marvel Comics, primarily in association with the X-Men. Created by Chris Claremont and Frank Miller, she first appeared in Marvel Team-Up #100 (December 1980).

She belongs to the subspecies of humans called mutants, who are born with superhuman abilities. Karma primarily possesses the ability to seize control of another's mind, though she has sometimes been depicted with other more extensive psionic abilities. The origin of the character relates to the Vietnam War, as she and her family were among the boat people fleeing the country shortly after the advent of Communism and in the wake of violence. During her fateful encounters with Spider-Man and the Fantastic Four, she absorbs her brother's powers and body to prevent him from endangering the group, thus doubling her powers in the process. Her Vietnamese origin contributes to two of her main traits—her Catholicism and her mastery of the French language, both of which stem from France's strong historical influence in Vietnam. Karma speaks English with a French accent rather than a Vietnamese one.

Karma was one of the five founding members of the New Mutants, along with Cannonball, Psyche, Sunspot, and Wolfsbane. Being several years older than the others, and the legal guardian of her siblings from a young age, she was the most mature member, and the only one in the original lineup who was introduced in published comics before the team itself. Karma is one of the first major lesbian characters in a mainstream comic book.

== Publication history ==
Karma first appeared in Marvel Team-Up #100 (December 1980). She joined the New Mutants as a founding member in Marvel Graphic Novel #4: The New Mutants (September 1982) and appeared as a regular cast member in The New Mutants in issues #1–6 (1983) and issues #29–54 (1985–1987). She later guest-starred in Wolverine (vol. 2) issues #4–8 (1989) and #27–30 (1990).

Karma appeared in the 1994 "Child's Play" crossover between X-Force and The New Warriors and later featured in three limited series: Beast (1997), New Mutants: Truth or Death (1997–1998) and Mekanix (2002–2003). She returned to regular publication in New Mutants (vol. 2) (2004) and continued to appear as a supporting character when the title was relaunched as New X-Men (vol. 2) (2004–2007).

After New X-Men (vol. 2) was cancelled in 2007, Karma made sporadic appearances in Uncanny X-Men in late 2008 and early 2009 before regularly appearing in New Mutants (vol. 3) (2009–2012). Following the 2011 "Schism" storyline and the 2011–2012 "Regenesis" event, she joined the cast of Astonishing X-Men (vol. 3), beginning in issue #48 (May 2012). After the series' conclusion in 2013, she made brief appearances as a supporting character in various X-Men books, including All-New X-Men (2015).

In 2018, she appeared in The New Mutants: Dead Souls and then regularly appeared in Uncanny X-Men (vol. 5) between issues #12 (April 2019) and #18 (July 2019). During the Krakoan Age between 2019 and 2024, she regularly appeared in New Mutants (vol. 4) (2020–2023) and frequently featured in other X-Men titles published throughout the era. After the end of the Krakoan Age, Karma appeared as a member of Tiger Division in the 2025 miniseries Doom's Division during the "One World Under Doom" event.

=== Character name ===
When Karma was introduced in Marvel Team-Up #100, her name was given as "Xi'an Coy Manh" and she was later nicknamed "Shan" by her New Mutants teammates. In Love Unlimited Infinity Comic #31, published on January 5, 2023, the character's name was revised to "Xuân Cao Mạnh", or "Mạnh Cao Xuân" using Vietnamese naming order. Love Unlimited Infinity Comic #31 was written and illustrated by Vietnamese-American cartoonist Trung Le Nguyen, who explained the rationale for the change:

As a reader who spoke Vietnamese as a child, it was really difficult for me to connect with Karma because I knew her name was gibberish. For example, the "sh" sound in "Xi'an" doesn't exist in the Vietnamese language. Vietnamese written language uses a Latin alphabet. You don't have to phonetically approximate the sounds because we already use letters you know. [...] In clarifying her name—or renaming her—I wanted to nod to her comic book origins by keeping her name as close to its original as possible while making it legible to readers familiar with Vietnamese. I changed very few letters, but I think it helps give her a fresh start. That's why I named her "Xuân" [pronounced "Swun"]. It means "Spring."

== Fictional character biography ==
=== Introduction ===
Xuân (pronounced "Swun") Cao Mạnh was born in the central highlands of Vietnam with her twin brother Trân Cao Mạnh. Her father is an unpopular colonel in the South Vietnamese army and his family, including his wife, elder twins Xuân and Trân, and younger twins Leong and Nga, accompanies him on his undesirable assignments. When Trân is attacked by a Viet Cong soldier, Xuân's mutant power of possession manifests to protect him. Trân soon exhibits an identical power, although he relishes in using it to force his attacker to kill himself. Seeing his potential, their uncle, General Nguyen Ngoc Cao, takes Trân with him to the United States after the fall of Saigon, while Xuân and the rest of their family are left to escape on an overcrowded boat with hundreds of other refugees. During their long journey, Xuân becomes too weak from disease and hunger to use her powers and is subsequently unable to defend herself and the other passengers when the boat is boarded by Thai pirates. The pirates kill Xuân's father and the rest of the men onboard and rape the women, including Xuân and her mother. Her mother dies of her injuries shortly thereafter.

Arriving in New York City, Xuân, Leong, and Nga reunite with Trân and General Cao, now a successful crime lord thanks to Trân's powers. A program to help Vietnamese immigrants run by Catholic priest Father Michael Bowen helps Xuân find work and an apartment. However, General Cao insists she use her powers in his service with Trân and kidnaps Leong and Nga when she refuses. With the aid of Spider-Man and the Fantastic Four, Xuân rescues her younger siblings. When Trân attempts to stop them by possessing the Fantastic Four and using them to fight Spider-Man, Xuân lashes out and bests her brother in a psychic battle, absorbing him and imprisoning him within her soul. Her own powers are enhanced as a result and she takes the name Karma.

=== New Mutants ===
Mister Fantastic refers Karma to Professor X, and she becomes his first recruit for his new team, the New Mutants. She has been working a full-time job to support herself and her siblings, and so agrees to work as Xavier's secretary to help him run the school in return for a generous salary and joins the New Mutants, appearing throughout the team's eponymous book.

During an attack by the Sentinels, the other New Mutants begin implicitly following Karma as their leader, as she is the oldest and most mature member of the team. While they are rescuing their teammate Psyche from a terrorist complex in Big Sur, Karma is attacked by an unseen foe and collapses. She disappears during the destruction of the complex and the rest of the team believes her to be dead. The circumstances of her disappearance are not revealed until later and vary from version to version; in one account, when the complex collapses, her teammate Sunspot tries to grab her as she falls off a cliff into the sea but is too slow, while in another, Sunspot successfully grabs her and falls into the sea with her, and only then loses his grip.

It is later revealed that Karma's attacker is Amahl Farouk, an evil telepath seemingly vanquished by Professor X decades ago. He possesses her body and becomes a crime boss running a gladiatorial arena. Karma becomes obese during this time, as Farouk indulges his gluttonous appetite while possessing her. With the aid of her former teammates, Farouk is defeated and Karma rejoins the New Mutants. During an adventure in Asgard, Karma spends months in a desert wasteland, shedding her excess weight and regaining her old physique.

Father Bowen, Karma's confessor, cares for Leong and Nga during her absence, but she resumes caring for her siblings upon her return to the New Mutants, living in a small apartment on Manhattan's Lower East Side. When they go missing during the 1986 "Mutant Massacre" event and the combined resources of Xavier's School and the Hellfire Club cannot locate them, Karma leaves the New Mutants to work for her uncle, General Cao, in exchange for his help.

=== Post-New Mutants ===
Karma next appears as an infrequent supporting character in Wolverine (vol. 2), working for her uncle's criminal operations in Madripoor. After Wolverine appeals to her conscience, she begins covertly acting against General Cao when his actions threaten innocent lives. Cao strings Karma along for several months with promises of finding her siblings, but after he and his associates orchestrate the massacre of an entire village, she breaks her ties with him.

After appearing in the 1994 "Child's Play" event in X-Force and The New Warriors, Karma's search for her siblings continues in the 1997 miniseries Beast, in which she discovers that they were abducted by Shinobi Shaw and sold to Viper and Spiral to be experimented on. With the help of Cannonball and Beast, Karma locates and frees Leong and Nga, also learning that Trân's essence is still alive, though dormant, within her.

Karma reunites with the New Mutants when they meet their time-traveling past selves in New Mutants: Truth or Death (1997–1998). She demonstrates expanded telepathic powers, specifically removing the memories of the older New Mutants from the minds of their younger selves by briefly possessing them. Her next appearance in X-Force #75 (March 1998) features a major visual change for the character, sporting dyed hair and body piercings.

In the 2002–2003 Mekanix series, Karma is shown to have moved to Chicago with Leong and Nga and taken a job as a librarian at the University of Chicago while also attending classes. There, she aids Shadowcat in combating the anti-mutant hate group Purity, while also hinting at a same-sex attraction to her.

=== New X-Men ===
Karma features prominently in New Mutants (vol. 2) (2003–2004) and New X-Men (vol. 2) (2004–2005), in which she joins the Xavier Institute as the librarian and French teacher. During this time, she comes out as a lesbian. She is specifically chosen as a mentor by the younger student Anole, and later is a mentor to all students less than fifteen years of age (thus too young to be assigned to a squad). She returns to a more modest appearance and attire to better reflect her new position.

After Wolfsbane leaves the Xavier Institute following the revelation of her inappropriate romance with Elixir, Karma takes over her position as advisor of the Paragons squad. With the apparent death of Northstar, she also becomes the advisor to the Alpha Squadron. Magma eventually takes over as the advisor of the Paragons. Karma retains her powers after M-Day, when the Scarlet Witch depowers most mutants, and continues to work at the Xavier Institute.

=== New Mutants Reunion ===
Karma joins the X-Men during the 2008 "Manifest Destiny" event and moves to Utopia, the team's island base off the coast of San Francisco, with Leong and Nga. There, she joins the X-Men's New Mutants squad with some of her old teammates and appears regularly in New Mutants (vol. 3).

During the 2010 "Second Coming" event, the New Mutants are sent to engage the Right and Cameron Hodge. During the battle, Karma attempts to take control of Hodge, but his cybernetic nature makes him immune to her powers and he impales her left leg. Hodge is defeated, but as a result of her injuries, Karma loses her leg just above the knee. Madison Jeffries later makes her a bionic prosthetic. Following the 2011 "Age of X" event, Karma leaves the New Mutants to focus on rehabilitating the mutant Face.

=== Astonishing X-Men ===
In the aftermath of the 2011 "Schism" and the 2011–2012 "Regenesis" events, Karma leaves Utopia and returns to Westchester to join Wolverine's X-Men and becomes a junior staff member at the Jean Grey School for Higher Learning. During her tenure there, the team is attacked by the Marauders under the control of Susan Hatchi, a weapons developer testing her company's new nanotechnology.

It is soon revealed that Hatchi is Da'o Cao Mạnh, Karma's half-sister, seeking vengeance for their father, Colonel Cao, killing her mother and abandoning her. She uses Karma to successfully lure Cao, secretly still alive, out of hiding. Karma forges a psychic link with her half-sister and shows her the struggles she has had in her own life, despite the fact that their father acknowledged her. While the two sisters reconcile, their father takes advantage of Hatchi's distraction and shoots her. He is later arrested for her murder and Karma inherits the Hatchi Corporation as the only eligible relative of age, effectively becoming a billionaire.

Karma subsequently makes sporadic appearances in various X-Men series, including All-New X-Men as a member of the Utopians alongside Elixir, Madison Jeffries, Masque, Random, and Boom-Boom, seeking a peaceful life in the X-Men's former base on Utopia. She and the rest of the Utopians later relocate to the New Charles Xavier School for Mutants (formerly the Weapon X facility).

=== Dead Souls and Uncanny X-Men ===
In the miniseries The New Mutants: Dead Souls (2018), Karma forms her own personal New Mutants team backed by the Hatchi Corporation's resources and influence, with Magik leading Rictor, Wolfsbane, Boom-Boom, and Strong Guy to investigate paranormal threats. In reality, Karma is being influenced by her brother Trân into weaponizing magic, using the gestalt entity Moonlock (the merged Warlock and Mirage) to create magic techno-organic copies of the original New Mutants. Trân briefly escapes Karma's body and then returns to fully possess her. During the subsequent confrontation with the copies, Magik, Wolfsbane, and Strong Guy are infected by Warlock's transmode virus. Trân turns the infected team over to the Office of National Emergency (O*N*E), but is quickly infected with the virus by Magik. All of the infected mutants are acquired by O*N*E and forced into service as Sentinel-like mutant hunters and killers.

Karma next appears in Uncanny X-Men (vol. 5), in which she and the rest of her infected teammates are rescued and cured of the transmode virus by the X-Men. Regaining control of her body, she joins the team and fights against the forces of the dark elf Malekith in the 2019 "The War of the Realms" event. However, feeling extreme guilt over her brother's actions in The New Mutants: Dead Souls, she ultimately resigns from the X-Men.

=== Krakoan Age ===
When Krakoa is established as a mutant nation during the 2019 "Dawn of X" event, Karma moves there and rejoins the New Mutants, appearing regularly in New Mutants (vol. 4) (2020–2023) and New Mutants Lethal Legion (2023), as well as other X-Men titles throughout the Krakoan Age. With Mirage's help, she receives therapy for her past traumas and undergoes the Crucible, a combat ritual in which she would die and be resurrected, thus freeing her brother's soul from her body. The ritual is a success and Trân is resurrected by the Five into his own body. She plays a key role in freeing Amahl Farouk from the residual influence of the Shadow King and begins dating fellow New Mutant Galura.

=== One World Under Doom ===
During the 2025 "One World Under Doom" event, Karma appears in Doom's Division (2025), in which she joins the eponymous team (renamed from Tiger Division) to quell dissent against the world-conquering Doctor Doom in Asia. In reality, Karma and fellow Division member Wave are working with Sunfire and Division team leader White Fox to undermine Doom's regime. Their elaborate ruse is eventually revealed to the rest of the team, who join them in their rebellion, with Tiger Division going rogue, Sunfire faking his death, and White Fox maintaining a veneer of loyalty to Doom. Karma is shown helping Luna Snow create anti-Doom propaganda.

== Powers and abilities ==
Karma is a mutant telepath and empath with the ability to take possession of the minds and process the emotions of people and animals. She projects a psionic energy surge that overwhelms the consciousness of another sentient mind, rendering the victim unconscious while placing her own anima in command. It allows her to alter the victim's perceptions and memories, will people to fall asleep or divulge information, and operate their bodies as if they were an extension of her own.

When Karma initially takes possession of someone, she can only move her subject's body awkwardly until she acclimates to their body. If she remains in possession of a host for too long she will begin to think and act as her host would, and eventually her own personality will become subordinate to one identical to the host's. By possessing others remotely, she can mentally "see" through their eyes while remaining in her own body, though her control over them is limited. Although Karma can possess multiple subjects simultaneously, her control over her subjects is fragmented as she shifts her attention from one to another. She is able to use her power to disrupt other psi-signatures, protecting her from psychic assault. Karma has also been shown combining her powers with Mirage's in order to create an illusion that fools even Sabretooth's keen senses.

Karma is skilled with medieval weapons (particularly swords) due to the extended period of time she spent in Asgard. She is also familiar with first aid and firearms owing to her time in Vietnam. As the CEO of the Hatchi Corporation, she has access to multi-billion-dollar resources in weapons technology and other utilities.

== Reception ==
=== Accolades ===
- In 2014, Entertainment Weekly ranked Karma 56th in their "Let's rank every X-Man ever" list.
- In 2014, BuzzFeed ranked Karma 37th in their "95 X-Men Members Ranked From Worst To Best" list.
- In 2018, CBR.com ranked Karma 14th in their "20 Most Powerful Mutants From The '80s" list.
- In 2019, CBR.com included Karma in their "Marvel's Most Powerful New Mutants" list.
- In 2020, Scary Mommy included Karma in their "Looking For A Role Model? These 195+ Marvel Female Characters Are Truly Heroic" list.
- In 2022, CBR.com ranked Karma 7th in their "X-Men: 10 Queer and Awesome Mutants" list.

== Other versions ==
=== Age of Apocalypse ===
In the "Age of Apocalypse" reality, Karma is Angel's assistant, helping him manage his nightclub Heaven, and keeping a neutral stance in the civil war between Apocalypse's loyal followers, openly resistant mutants, and the human population. Part of Karma's job is to use her mental powers to gather information from their guests and to make sure none remember anything suspicious they might witness. Eventually, Karma is kidnapped by Apocalypse's troops to be interrogated about the X-Men. Karma keeps quiet as long as she can, but when the Shadow King is released on her, she gives away the desired information. She is then discarded outside Apocalypse's stronghold. Learning of his assistant's fate, an enraged Angel searches for her. When an Infinite guard calls out to him, he shoots the guard, recognizing too late that the guard's voice is Karma's. As he pulls her dying body from the suit of armor, she apologizes for having let him down.

=== Age of X ===
In the "Age of X" reality, Karma is a member of Dani Moonstar's Moonstar Cadre, who serve as hunters for Fortress X.

=== Days of Future Past ===
In the "Days of Future Tense" continuity, inspired by "Days of Future Past," Karma is part of Pete Wisdom's resistance force in Great Britain in the year 2013. She only answers to her codename, and has apparently suffered terrible losses. Trying to cope with her situation, Karma displays a dark sense of humor and has refined her powers to the point where she can perceive things through people's eyes without really possessing them.

=== House of M ===
In the "House of M" reality, Karma is a teacher at the New Mutant Leadership Institute. She is officially noted with S.H.I.E.L.D. for her pro-human sentiments, an unpopular opinion with the mutant ruling class.

=== Ultimate Marvel ===
The Ultimate Marvel version of Karma works as a S.H.I.E.L.D. Black Ops agent. She is called in by Nick Fury to find out whether or not the President was being mind-controlled by Charles Xavier, based on his sudden pro-mutant stance. At the President's request, she is added as the final member of the government-sponsored New Mutants to observe the team. She is later instrumental in gathering evidence against William Stryker, the head of an anti-mutant conspiracy, and arresting high-ranking officials involved in attacks on the New Mutants on the Capitol steps. Whenever she uses her powers, her eyes glow a dark pink color.

=== X-Men: The End ===
Karma is seen fighting alongside the X-Men when Skrulls invade the mansion.

== In other media ==
Karma makes a non-speaking cameo appearance in the X-Men: The Animated Series episode "Beyond Good and Evil - Part 2: Promise of Apocalypse" as a prisoner of Apocalypse.
