= Michael Ryan (artist) =

American comics artist

Michael Ryan is a comic book artist who has worked for Marvel Comics. In 2004, Marvel Comics signed a three-year contract with Ryan, whose first work was New X-Men: Academy X with Nunzio DeFilippis and Christina Weir. Marvel's editor-in-chief, Joe Quesada, later said, "We don't want him anywhere else but here!"

Ryan had a brief tenure on Marvel's award-winning series Runaways with the writer Joss Whedon. He and Sara Pichelli pencilled X-Men: Manifest Destiny #5 in 2008. He also briefly drew the Mystique mini-series, as well as the New Excalibur series with the writer Chris Claremont.

His latest work has been with Aspen Comics.
