= House of M =

Marvel Comics storyline

- Cover of House of M 1 (Aug 2005), art by Esad Ribić
- Publisher: Marvel Comics
- Publication date: June – November 2005
- Genre: Superhero; Crossover
Title(s)
Black Panther (vol. 4) #7
Cable & Deadpool #17
Captain America (vol. 5) #10
Civil War: House of M #1–5
Decimation: House of M – The Day After #1
Excalibur (vol. 3) #11–14
Exiles (vol. 1) #69–71
Fantastic Four: House of M #1–3
Giant-Size House of M #1 (2025)
House of M #1–8
House of M #1–8 Director's Cut #1
House of M Sketchbook
House of M: Avengers #1-5
House of M: Masters of Evil #1–4
House of M: Warzones #1–4 (2015)
Incredible Hulk (vol. 3) #83–86
Iron Man: House of M #1–3
Mutopia X #1–5
New Thunderbolts #11
New X-Men (vol. 2) #16–19
The Pulse #10
The Pulse: House of M Special #1
Secrets of the House of M #1
Spider-Man: House of M #1–5
Uncanny X-Men #462–465
What If? House of M #1
What If? Spider-Man: House of M #1–2
Wolverine (vol. 3) #33–35
- Main character(s): Avengers; Scarlet Witch; New Avengers; X-Men

Creative team
- Writer: Brian Michael Bendis
- Penciller: Olivier Coipel
- Inker(s): Tim Townsend; Rick Magyar; Scott Hanna; John Dell
- Letterer: Chris Eliopoulos
- Colorist(s): Frank D'Armata; Paul Mounts
- Editor(s): Tom Brevoort; Stephanie Moore; Molly Lazer; Andy Schmidt; Aubrey Sitterson
- Hardcover: ISBN 0-7851-2466-7
- Omnibus edition: ISBN 978-1302948221

"House of M" is a 2005 comic book storyline published by Marvel Comics, consisting of an eight-issue comic book limited series with a number of crossover tie-in books written by Brian Michael Bendis and illustrated by Olivier Coipel. Its first issue appeared in June 2005 as a follow-up to the events of Excalibur (vol.3) and the Avengers Disassembled storyline. The Scarlet Witch, her twin brother Quicksilver, and their father (at the time) Magneto play major roles in the series. House of M replaced the Earth-616 as the main reality for a brief time until Scarlet Witch reverted it to normal.

== Publication history ==
House of M was written by Brian Michael Bendis and drawn by Olivier Coipel. The series marketed as a crossover between Marvel’s two titles at the time New Avengers and Astonishing X-Men. The first issue was released in June 2005, with the series concluding in November 2005. The first two issues were ranked first and second in sales in the June 2005 period, with the first issue selling over 233,000 copies. The final issue, House of M #8, ranked third in sales for the November 2005 period with sales of 135,462. In addition to the main eight-issue limited series, House of M was preceded by a story in Excalibur #13–14, and had several tie-ins to ongoing series, including Uncanny X-Men, New X-Men: Academy X, The Incredible Hulk and Wolverine, and several miniseries: Fantastic Four: House of M, Iron-Man: House of M, Mutopia X: House of M, and Spider-Man: House of M.

Bendis, the lead writer for the House of M event, stated that the series would "shake the world and break the Internet wide open." Before the event, Bendis also mentioned in several interviews that the event would have a lasting effect on the Marvel Universe, but remained tight-lipped as to how.

The crossover was followed by a one-shot called House of M: Decimation – The Day After, a series called Son of M that depicts Quicksilver dealing with his loss of powers, and Generation M, which devoted each issue to a different mutant dealing with the loss of their powers. The storyline also led to the reboot of Excalibur into New Excalibur, a shift in the creative teams of several comics, and the debut of several spin-off series, including X-Men: Deadly Genesis, X-Men: The 198, Sentinel Squad O*N*E, Ms. Marvel, and a new X-Factor series.

The epilogue to the House of M and Decimation story-lines, served to answer the mystery of the cloud of energy hovering in orbit around Earth after House of M #8, was revealed in the pages of New Avengers #16–20.

== Synopsis ==
The events of House of M temporarily replaced the main reality of the Marvel Universe, Earth-616, until Wanda Maximoff/Scarlet Witch, restored her life at the end of the storyline. While the storyline’s events still exist, they now take place on Earth-58163.

House of M is set six months after the Avengers Disassembled storyline, in which Wanda, overwhelmed by grief and mental instability following the loss of her children, suffers a breakdown. This leads her to unintentionally unleash chaos, killing several Avengers, ending the team and slowly losing control of her reality-warping abilities.

House of Magnus, from left to right: Quicksilver, Scarlet Witch, her children William and Thomas, Magneto, and Polaris

House of M begins with Wanda living on the ruined island of Genosha under the care of Magneto and Charles Xavier. Xavier warns Magneto that he can no longer contain Wanda’s unstable reality-warping powers and that a permanent solution is needed. He subsequently summons the Avengers, the X-Men, and other heroes to Avengers Tower to decide her fate. Near the beginning of the meeting, Quicksilver leaves New York and returns to Genosha. Reacting to the fact that the X-Men and Avengers had gathered to discuss Wanda’s fate, he mistakenly concludes that they intend to kill her, asking, "Why else would they meet?" He tells Magneto of his fears, and later, in an attempt to protect Wanda, convinces her that rewriting reality is the only way to save herself. Wanda creates a new reality where mutants are the ruling class, while humans (referred to as "sapiens") are treated as second-class citizens. At the top of this mutant society is Magneto, the ruler of Genosha, with Wanda, Pietro, and their extended family living as global royalty.

In the altered reality, several heroes live under new identities and circumstances. Most of these characters have no memory of their original lives. Wolverine awakens on the Helicarrier as the only person who retains memories of the original world. He discovers the new reality and theorises that Magneto used Wanda to create a world where everyone's deepest wish was granted. Wolverine begins seeking allies and searches for the X-Men and the Avengers. Unable to find Xavier, he looks for Spider-Man and Iron Man but is confronted by the Red Guard, elite mutant soldiers of S.H.I.E.L.D. Escaping them, he joins the Human Resistance Movement, led by Luke Cage, which includes non-mutant heroes such as Hawkeye, who had been killed in the original timeline. Cage informs him that a young girl named Layla Miller—who has the power to restore lost memories—had already predicted Wolverine's arrival and theories. Together, they use her abilities to awaken the true memories of other heroes, forming a resistance.

They travel to Genosha to confront the House of M. During the battle, Wanda vanishes from the battlefield. Doctor Strange finds her in a secluded tower with her resurrected children. As Strange questions her, a flashback reveals that Quicksilver, not Magneto, was responsible for convincing her to create this new reality to make everyone happy in an almost-perfect world. Immediately after this revelation, Frost tells Strange to ask about the fate of Xavier. Before she can answer, Wanda is shot in the back with an arrow by Hawkeye, who angrily confronts her over his death in the original timeline. After a brief exchange, Hawkeye is killed for a second time by one of Wanda's sons, using his powers to "erase" him.

Meanwhile, Magneto confronts Frost and Layla, who reveal the full truth to him. Enraged, he then attacks those around him, especially his son Quicksilver, whom he kills by beating him with metal debris. Wanda suddenly appears, resurrects her brother, and begins to lash out, blaming Magneto and mutantkind for her pain. She then utters, "No more mutants", and reality snaps back to its original form. In the process, nearly all mutants worldwide are de-powered, leaving only a handful with their abilities. Wanda then disappears.

In the aftermath, the cause of the global de-powering remains unknown to the heroes. Xavier is still missing, and neither Cerebro nor Doctor Strange can locate Wanda. Hank Pym warns that all these powers could not simply vanish but are contained somewhere, and that because every action has an equal and opposite reaction, the question remains as to what the reaction to these events will be. A colossal red ribbon of energy begins to orbit Earth.

The universe of House of M is designated as Earth-58163 in the Marvel Comics multiverse.

== Timeline ==
The following is Marvel's recommended reading order for the "House of M" storyline and its tie-ins, including issues from other series that connect to the main story. For comics covering the aftermath of the storyline, as well as other later series that tie into "House of M" (see below).

- 1-2. House of M #1–2
- 3. Fantastic Four: House of M #1
- 4. Spider-Man: House of M #1
- 5. Iron Man: House of M #1
- 6. House of M #3
- 7. Hulk (1999) #83
- 8. Uncanny X-Men #462
- 9. Mutopia X #1
- 10. Spider-Man: House of M #2
- 11. House of M #4
- 12. Cable & Deadpool #17
- 13. Hulk #84
- 14. Pulse #10
- 15. New X-Men #16
- 16. Fantastic Four: House of M #2
- 17. Iron Man: House of M #2
- 18. Uncanny X-Men #463
- 19. House of M #5
- 20. New Thunderbolts #11
- 21. Hulk #85
- 22. Mutopia X #2
- 23. Spider-Man: House of M #3
- 24. Black Panther #7
- 25. New X-Men #17
- 26. Fantastic Four: House of M #3
- 27. Iron Man: House of M #3
- 28. Exiles #69
- 29. Hulk #86
- 30. Uncanny X-Men #464
- 31. Mutopia X #3
- 32. Captain America #10
- 33. Exiles #70
- 34. Spider-Man: House of M #4
- 35. New X-Men #18
- 36. Wolverine #33
- 37. Uncanny X-Men #465
- 38. House of M #6
- 39. Mutopia X #4
- 40. House of M #7
- 41. Wolverine #34
- 42. Exiles #71
- 43. New X-Men #19
- 44. Wolverine #35
- 45. Spider-Man: House of M #5
- 46. House of M #8
- 47. Decimation: House of M – The Day After #1

=== Aftermath ===
The "House of M" storyline resulted in the reduction of the mutant population from millions to hundreds. Only two current members of the X-Men (Polaris and Professor X) suffered this fate, as well as former X-Men member Chamber. Several minor allies and enemies were depowered, including Callisto and Blob. Their main adversary Magneto also lost his abilities, and two members of the Avengers, Quicksilver and Scarlet Witch.

During the Krakoan Age, the Crucible was established on Krakoa, which allowed mutants to regain their powers by dying in combat and then being resurrected.

=== House of M: Avengers ===
The five-issue limited series House of M: Avengers debuted in November 2007, written by Christos Gage and drawn by Mike Perkins. The series spans from 1979 to the present day and acts as a prequel to the original House of M miniseries, showing the formation of Luke Cage's Human Resistance Movement.

=== Civil War: House of M ===
The 2008 miniseries Civil War: House of M depicts how Magneto took over the world and made mutants the dominant race, as well as confirming that Xavier is dead in this reality.

=== House of M: Masters of Evil ===
Set after Civil War: House of M, this miniseries depicts the Hood assembling a gang of the deadliest "sapiens" super-criminals.

=== "Spider-Verse" ===
In the run-up to the 2014 "Spider-Verse" storyline, the Superior Spider-Man is temporarily trapped in the year 2099, with his attempts to return home via a dimensional portal resulting in him witnessing various alternate worlds where other Spider-Men had been killed by Morlun. Among the dead counterparts of Spider-Man appears to originate from the "House of M" universe.

== Collected editions ==
=== Trade paperbacks ===
The trade paperbacks collect many of the issues involved with the House of M storyline. Arranged in order, the spines of the books form the House of M logo. Each storyline/paperback contains a mostly standalone side story and can be read individually without any continuity problems. Only the House of M miniseries itself deals with the main storyline.

Title	Material collected	Publication date	ISBN
House of M	House of M #1–8	February 2006	0-7851-1721-0
House of M: Excalibur – Prelude	Excalibur #11–14	July 2005	0-7851-1812-8
House of M: Fantastic Four / Iron Man	Fantastic Four: House of M #1–3; Iron Man: House of M #1–3	February 2006	978-0785119234
House of M: The Incredible Hulk	The Incredible Hulk #84–86	February 2006	0-7851-1834-9
House of M: Uncanny X-Men	Uncanny X-Men #462–465; first half of Secrets of the House of M	February 2006	978-0785116639
House of M: Mutopia X	Mutopia X #1–5	February 2006	978-0785118114
House of M: New X-Men	New X-Men: Academy X #16–19; second half of Secrets of the House of M	February 2006	978-0785119418
House of M: Spider-Man	Spider-Man: House of M #1–5	February 2006	978-0785117537
House of M: World of M, Featuring Wolverine	Wolverine #33–35; Captain America #10; Black Panther #7; Pulse #10	February 2006	978-0785119227
House of M: Avengers	House of M: Avengers #1–5	June 2008	978-0785127505
House of M: Civil War	Civil War: House of M #1–5	April 2009	978-0785133803
House of M: Masters of Evil	House of M: Masters of Evil #1–4	February 2010	978-0785141662

=== Hardcovers ===
Title	Material collected	Publication date	ISBN
House of M, Vol 1	House of M #1–8; The Pulse Special Edition; Secrets of the House of M	January 2008	978-0785124665
House of M, Vol 2: Spider-Man, Fantastic Four, and X-Men	Spider-Man: House of M #1–5; New Thunderbolts #11; Fantastic Four: House of M #1–3; Black Panther #7; Uncanny X-Men #462–465	December 2009	978-0785138815
House of M, Vol 3: Wolverine, Iron Man, and Hulk	Wolverine #33–35; Iron Man: House of M #1–3; Incredible Hulk #83–87; Hulk: Broken Worlds #1; Captain America #10; Pulse #10; Cable & Deadpool #17	January 2010	978-0785138822
House of M, Vol 4: No More Mutants	Mutopia X #1–5; New X-Men #16–19; Exiles #69–71; House of M: The Day After; Giant-Size Ms. Marvel #1	April 2010	978-0785138839
House of M Omnibus	House of M #1-8, Spider-Man: House of M #1-5, Fantastic Four: House of M #1-3, Iron Man: House of M #1-3, New Thunderbolts #11, Black Panther #7, Uncanny X-Men #462-465, Wolverine #33-35, Captain America #10, Pulse #10, Cable & Deadpool #17, Incredible Hulk #83-87, New X-Men #16-19, Exiles #69-71, Mutopia X #1-5, Decimation: House of M - The Day After, Giant-Size Ms. Marvel #1, Secrets of the House of M, Pulse: House of M Special, House of M #1 Director's Cut, House of M Sketchbook, and material from Hulk: Broken Worlds Book One	November 22, 2022	978-1302948221

=== Spin-offs ===
Title	Material Collected	Publication Date	ISBN
House of M: Warzones!	House of M (vol. 2) #1-4 and House of M (vol. 1) #1	January 13, 2016	978-0785198727

== Other versions ==
- The one-shot What If? House of M focuses on an alternate universe where the Scarlet Witch removed the superpowers of everybody on Earth rather than solely affecting mutants.
- Two issues of What If? in the 2009 series revolve around the Spider-Man: House of M miniseries. The first one asks what would have happened had Emma Frost not wiped Gwen Stacy's mind and she had accompanied the heroes to Genosha. The second one asks what would have happened if the Scarlet Witch had allowed Gwen and her son with Peter to exist after returning reality back to normal.
- The "House of M" timeline appeared in the 2015 storyline "Secret Wars". Its location on Battleworld is called the Monarchy of M.

== In other media ==
The Marvel Cinematic Universe miniseries WandaVision is inspired by the House of M storyline. Wanda Maximoff creates an alternate reality after Vision's death, although she only affects one town, Westview, instead of the whole world. Her children also appear in both WandaVision and Doctor Strange in the Multiverse of Madness.

== See also ==
- Marvel Comics multiverse
