= X-Mansion =

Fictional mansion in the X-Men comics

- Marvel Comics location
- The Xavier Institute for Higher Learning
- First appearance: The X-Men #1 (September 1963)
- Created by: Stan Lee; Jack Kirby

In-universe information
- Location: Salem Center, New York
- Characters: X-Men; Xavier Institute's Students and Faculties
- Publisher: Marvel Comics

X-Mansion and Xavier Institute are the common names for a mansion and research institute appearing in American comic books published by Marvel Comics. The mansion is depicted as the private estate of Charles Xavier and serves as the base of operations, residence and training site of the X-Men. It is also the location of an accredited private school for mutant children, teenagers, and sometimes older aged mutants, the Xavier Institute for Higher Learning, formerly known as the Xavier School for Gifted Youngsters. The X-Mansion is also the worldwide headquarters of the X-Corporation.

The X-Mansion's address is 1407 Graymalkin Lane, Salem Center, located in Westchester County, New York. The school's motto is mutatis mutandis. In a 2011 edition of the comic, Wolverine re-opens the school, at the same address, under the name of the Jean Grey School for Higher Learning. After the Terrigen Mist Cloud becomes toxic enough to mutants that they die from M-Pox, Storm has renamed the mansion, X-Haven and moved to Limbo to keep mutants safe from the Terrigen while a cure is sought. After Medusa destroys the Terrigen Cloud so the mutants could survive, Kitty Pryde moves the mansion from Limbo to Central Park, New York, and renames it the Xavier Institute for Mutant Education and Outreach. Following the end of the Krakoan Age, the X-Mansion was converted into a prison to house the mysterious Inmate-X, forcing the remaining members of the X-Men to forge a newly acquired base of their own.

== History ==
The X-Mansion is the inherited property of Charles Xavier (Professor X) and has been in the Xavier family for ten generations including two known mutants in the lineage, both becoming detached from the family. Little else is known about them or their mutations.

As Xavier's School for Gifted Youngsters, the X-Mansion was the training site of the first two generations of teenage X-Men:

- The X-Men: 1st Class – Cyclops, Iceman, Angel, Beast, Jean Grey (Marvel Girl) and then later Havok, Polaris, Mimic, and Changeling join the team as well.
- The original New Mutants – Cannonball, Wolfsbane, Mirage, Karma, Sunspot, Cypher, Magma, Magik, and Warlock along with Shadowcat, a contemporary member of the original New Mutants who was their classmate but was a member of the adult X-Men team instead.

In X-Men (vol. 2) #38 (November 1994), the X-Mansion was renamed from Xavier's School for Gifted Youngsters to the Xavier Institute for Higher Learning, as most of the X-Men were adults rather than teenagers by this time. Xavier's School for Gifted Youngsters was relocated to the Massachusetts Academy in Western Massachusetts (a Marvel created town or region called Snow Valley somewhere in The Berkshires), which served as the training site of the third generation of teenage X-Men beginning in Generation X #1 (November 1994).

- Generation X – Skin, Synch, M, Husk, Jubilee, Chamber, Blink, Mondo, Gaia, and Penance

The Massachusetts Academy closes permanently in Generation X #75 (June 2001). Shortly thereafter, the school for young mutants is reopened at the X-Mansion, but the name remains "The Xavier Institute for Higher Learning" despite the younger student body. The fourth generation of mutant teenagers, featured in Grant Morrison's New X-Men (2001–2004) and in New Mutants (2003–2004; relaunched as New X-Men: Academy X, July 2004–February 2008), study at the mansion until it is destroyed during the 2007–2008 story "Messiah Complex" and the X-Men subsequently disband and close the institute.

Though protected by high-tech defenses, the X-Mansion has often been breached by the supervillains and evil mutants faced by the X-Men. Indeed, the X-Mansion has been destroyed and rebuilt several times. It was demolished in a battle with the Sidri in The Uncanny X-Men #154 (February 1982) and atomized by Mister Sinister in The Uncanny X-Men #243 (April 1989). It was rebuilt by a future Franklin Richards in moments, but reverted to its destroyed state after the time-traveler became confused. Certain portions of the mansion, such as its sub-basements, survived both demolitions.

In the "Messiah Complex" storyline, the mansion is destroyed by Sentinels. Unlike past times, the mansion was not rebuilt for a considerable length of time. Rather, the X-Men and their students relocated to a new base of operations in San Francisco. Under the name Graymalkin Industries, the new X-base is not run as a school, but rather as a sort of community center for mutants who wish to develop their powers.

=== Faculty (pre-Messiah Complex) ===
- Shadowcat teaches computer science classes and, in addition to being a member of the senior staff, acts as a student advisor and liaison for the senior staff.
- Karma teaches French and is in charge of students who are too young to join the training squads. She also oversees the library.
- Nightcrawler teaches music, art, life sciences, and drama.
- Beast teaches science and mathematics and is part of the senior staff, presumably overseeing the curriculum.
- Emma Frost, besides being the headmistress of the Xavier Institute, also teaches English, business, and ethics. She also presides over the new team of X-Men, teaching them to work as a team, with some assistance from the senior staff, such as Colossus.
- Wolverine teaches close quarters combat.
- Cyclops, besides being the headmaster of the Xavier Institute, also teaches the elective leadership and tactics.
- Northstar, before his death (and later resurrection), taught business and consumer law classes, as well as a flying class. He also mentored the Alpha Squadron training squad.
- Iceman is a Certified Public Accountant and teaches classes in mathematics, finance, and accounting.
- Gambit teaches a target practice class for students with projectile-based powers. He also mentors the Chevaliers training squad.
- Wolfsbane, in addition to mentoring the Paragons, is a teaching assistant in Beast's science class.

=== Post X-Men: Schism ===
After the events of X-Men: Schism, Wolverine and half of the X-Men return to Westchester, New York and the X-Mansion. The name of the school is now the Jean Grey School for Higher Learning. Its grounds are a spawn of the living island Krakoa. In the first issue of Wolverine and the X-Men, an entirely new school is built on the grounds. It is funded mainly with scientific advancements by the students and diamonds from Krakoa.

- Storm – Headmistress
- Beast – Vice principal
- Rogue – Senior staff
- Iceman – Senior staff
- Rachel Summers – Senior staff
- Northstar – Senior staff
- Firestar – Senior staff
- Chamber – Junior staff
- Frenzy – Junior staff
- Karma – Junior staff
- Husk – Junior staff
- Warbird – Junior staff
- Deathlok – Adjunct staff and campus guard
- Doop – Adjunct staff
- Spider-Man – Adjunct staff and guidance counselor
- Angel – Graduate assistant and recruiter
- Cecilia Reyes – Resident physician
- Kavita Rao – Resident doctor
- Jubilee – Resident and member
- Armor – Member
- Pixie – Member
- Kid Omega – Member
- Nightcrawler – Member
- Colossus – Member

After Wolverine's death in the "Death of Wolverine" storyline, Spider-Man becomes a guidance counselor in the series Spider-Man and the X-Men.

=== X-Haven ===
Under the All-New, All-Different Marvel re-branding, X-Haven was a sanctuary founded by Storm and her Extraordinary X-Men to protect mutants from the Terrigen Mist. The Jean Grey School for Higher Learning is temporarily teleported to a pocket dimension within Limbo and given magical defenses created by Magik to repel demons.

=== The Xavier Institute for Mutant Education and Outreach ===
Kitty Pryde moves the school to New York and renames it as the Xavier Institute for Mutant Education and Outreach. The Mansion is demolished after the events of Extermination.

=== Post-Krakoan Age: From the Ashes ===
After Professor X is imprisoned, the X-Mansion undergoes renovations by the United States government and is converted into a correction facility known as Graymalkin Prison. Led by Corina Ellis as its prison warden, Graymalkin Prison houses mutant prisoners, who are released to do Ellis's bidding. Ellis is removed from power after it is uncovered that she has no legal authority to arrest mutants. Former inmate Penance takes advantage of the power vacuum and becomes prison warden.

Following the loss of the X-Mansion, Emma Frost establishes Graymatter Lane, a new training center located in the mental plane. Graymatter Lane includes Prodigy as dean, with Wolverine, X-23, Beast, Storm, and Magneto as teachers.

== Layout ==
In the middle of the main courtyard is the Phoenix Memorial Statue, dedicated to the memory of Jean Grey. Notable rooms include the Danger Room and a room containing Cerebro. The Headmasters Office of Cyclops and Emma Frost is on the top floor.

The basketball court is a popular hang-out. It was the site of a basketball game in X-Men (vol. 2) #4 (January 1992). Directly below the basketball court is the hangar, which houses many transportation vehicles, as well as aircraft such as the X-Men Blackbird.

There is also a cemetery with memorials for deceased X-Men like Thunderbird and others.

== Other versions ==
=== Age of Apocalypse ===
An alternate universe iteration of the X-Mansion appears in Age of Apocalypse. This version is the headquarters for a mutant resistance cell against Apocalypse, who has conquered North America.

=== Age of Revelation ===
A possible future version of Graymalkin Prison appears in "Age of Revelation". This version was sealed off following the spread of the X-Virus. Revelation's forces later attack the prison, kill Corina Ellis, and crucify her body.

=== Mutant X ===
An alternate universe iteration of the X-Mansion appears in Mutant X. This version is run by Magneto, who has taken up Professor X's ideologies.

=== Predator vs. Wolverine ===
An alternate universe iteration of the X-Mansion appears in Predator vs. Wolverine.

=== Prelude to Deadpool Corps ===
An alternate universe iteration of the X-Mansion appears in Prelude to Deadpool Corps. This version is an orphanage run by Professor X.

=== Ultimate Marvel ===
An alternate universe iteration of the X-Mansion appears in the Ultimate Marvel imprint. This version is initially funded by Magneto before he departs and Charles Xavier assumes control of the facility. It is later revealed that Xavier has several financial backers, including the Hellfire Club and the Church of the Shi'ar, who choose to remain anonymous due to the public's anti-mutant sentiments. Following the events of Ultimate Requiem, in which several members of the X-Men are killed, Iceman demolishes the mansion.

== In other media ==
=== Television ===
- The X-Mansion appears in Spider-Man and His Amazing Friends.
- The X-Mansion appears in X-Men: Pryde of the X-Men.
- The X-Mansion appears in X-Men: The Animated Series.
- The X-Mansion appears in Spider-Man: The Animated Series.
- The X-Mansion appears in X-Men: Evolution. This version is located in Bayville, New York.
- The X-Mansion appears in Wolverine and the X-Men.
- The X-Mansion appears in The Super Hero Squad Show.
- The X-Mansion appears in X-Men '97.

=== Film ===
- In X-Men (2000), the exterior of the X-Mansion was filmed at Casa Loma, a mansion in Toronto.
- In Generation X, X2, X-Men: The Last Stand, Deadpool, and Deadpool 2, the X-Mansion is portrayed by Hatley Castle in Victoria, British Columbia. Elements of Hatley Castle's exterior influenced the depiction of the X-Mansion in X-Men: Days of Future Past, X-Men: Apocalypse, and Dark Phoenix.
- In X-Men: First Class (2011), the X-Mansion is portrayed by the Englefield House, an Elizabethan manor in Berkshire, England.
- An alternate universe version of the X-Mansion appears in the mid-credits scene of The Marvels.

=== Video games ===
- The X-Mansion appears in X-Men: Next Dimension.
- The X-Mansion appears as a hub area in X-Men Legends and X-Men Legends II: Rise of Apocalypse.
- The X-Mansion appears as a hub area in Marvel Heroes.
- The X-Mansion appears in Lego Marvel Super Heroes. This version is located in Inwood, Manhattan.
- The X-Mansion appears in Marvel Ultimate Alliance 3: The Black Order.
- The X-Mansion appears as a playable arena in Marvel Tokon: Fighting Souls.

=== Miscellaneous ===
The X-Mansion appears at the end of the X-Men/Star Trek crossover novel Planet X.

== See also ==
- Avengers Mansion
- Baxter Building
- Xavier Institute student body
