= Decimation (comics) =

Marvel Comics storyline event

- Decimation event logo, as shown on the covers of tie-in comics
- Publisher: Marvel Comics
- Publication date: January – August 2006
- Genre: Superhero; Crossover
Title(s)
Decimation: House of M – The Day After
Generation M #1–5
New Avengers (2004) #16–20
New Excalibur #1–7
New X-Men #20–27
Sentinel Squad O*N*E #1–5
Son of M #1–6
Uncanny X-Men #466–474
Wolverine #36–40
X-Factor #1–6
X-Men #177–179
X-Men: Deadly Genesis #1–6
X-Men: The 198 #1–5
X-Men: The 198 Files
X-Men Unlimited #13
- X-Men: Decimation Omnibus edition: ISBN 978-1302960254

"Decimation" is a 2005 Marvel Comics crossover storyline that follows the aftermath of the House of M series. It begins with the one-shot issue titled Decimation: House of M – The Day After, written by Chris Claremont, and illustrated by Randall Green and Aaron Lopresti, released on November 9, 2005. The storyline then unfolded across multiple tie-in issues and series, all featuring the "Decimation" logo on the cover.

The name "Decimation" refers to Wanda Maximoff/Scarlet Witch’s act at the end of the House of M limited series, in which she utters the phrase "No more mutants". This rewrites the Marvel Universe by depowering the vast majority of mutants. This event is also referred to by several names in Marvel titles, most notably "M-Day". The titles and issues focus on a select range of characters across the Marvel Universe, including the X-Men, New X-Men, Excalibur, X-Factor Investigations, New Avengers, and more, as they adjust to the loss of their powers.

== Overview ==
=== Origins and names ===
At the conclusion of the House of M limited series, Wanda Maximoff utters the phrase "No more mutants". This act dissolved the alternate "House of M" reality (designated Earth-58163) and snapped the universe back to the core Marvel reality, Earth-616, but with its fabric permanently rewritten. This act, dubbed the "Decimation", is a reality-altering "spell" that rewrote the fabric of the Marvel Universe. It depowered existing mutants, suppressed the mutant gene, the "X-gene", and prevented the birth of new mutants for years, ultimately reducing the mutant population from millions to fewer than 200.

The "Decimation" served as the basis for the storyline crossover event that examines the fallout from the "House of M" event. It is an arc that allowed Marvel to regain control and reconstruct X-Men title continuity while also returning X-Men to their original state as alienated and feared outsiders.

Throughout different Marvel Comics, "Decimation" is also referred to by several alternate names, including: "M-Day" in Generation M, "Mutant Decimation" in Avengers: The Children's Crusade, "The Great Power Outage of 2005" in X-Factor, "The M-Day Decimation" in X-Men: Legacy, and "Wandageddon" in Way of X.

=== Storyline ===
The "Decimation" storyline began with the self-titled one-shot Decimation: House of M: The Day After, it heralded the relaunch of the Excalibur team in New Excalibur, focusing on Pete Wisdom looking for Captain Britain to head up a new British super team, as well as the relaunch of X-Factor from the MadroX miniseries. It also includes several mini-series—Son of M starring a depowered Quicksilver, Generation M focusing on other depowered characters, Sentinel Squad O*N*E showing the latest iteration of the mutant-hunting Sentinels to be robots piloted by humans, X-Men: Deadly Genesis, and X-Men: The 198—and continues throughout the Marvel Universe, particularly in the X-Men-related titles. One consequence is an upswing of anti-mutant sentiment, especially among certain religious groups, who consider M-Day to be God's judgment against mutant-kind.

It has been confirmed through various sources that there are considerably more than 198 mutants remaining—the number has been referred to as "symbolic" rather than actual, and in The 198 Files is said to be the earliest confirmed number. Numbers for pre-Decimation mutants vary from "over a million" (House of M #8) to 14 million (New X-Men #115, where it is said that the 16 million mutants who died on Genosha was around "over half" of the estimated global mutant population of 30 million mutants), giving a population, if the commonly used 90% depowered figure is true, of between one hundred thousand and one and a half million. Based on the mathematical comparisons of the oft-repeated 198 and several million, Marvel re-evaluated the 90% figure into "over 99%", as shown in Civil War: Battle Damage Report when Iron Man comments on the Post-CW world.

Both Hank Pym and Beast note shortly after the event that it is impossible for the energy that certain mutants controlled to simply have vanished, and that it must have been "sent" somewhere. As would later be revealed in New Avengers, most of this energy became a sentient entity called the Collective, who has since come into violent conflict with the Avengers. In addition, a portion of the energy revived the body of Gabriel Summers, brother of both Alex (Havok) and Scott Summers (Cyclops), who had been trapped in space for many years following the defeat of Krakoa, as depicted in the X-Men: Deadly Genesis limited series.

== Titles ==
According to Marvel editor-in-chief Joe Quesada, the "Decimation" event was designed to reduce the number of mutant characters in the Marvel Universe, which he felt had gotten out of hand after forty years of publishing.

The "Decimation" storyline began with the self-titled one-shot Decimation: House of M: The Day After. Released on November 9, 2005, it was written by Chris Claremont and illustrated by Randall Green and Aaron Lopresti.

=== Tie-in issues ===
Tie-in issues were released following House of M and tied directly into "Decimation":

- New X-Men #20–27: Five-issue story arc titled "Childhood's End," had its first issue released on November 9, 2005; collected in 2019 as New X-Men: Childhood's End Vol. 1. The story follows the New X-Men teammates as they deal with the consequences of House of M, including new threats, and the struggle to adapt to a changed world after they lost their powers.
- X-Men #177–179: Three-issue story arc titled "House Arrest" had its first issue released on November 16, 2005. It was later collected on October 18, 2006, as Decimation: X-Men – The Day After. The story depicts turmoil at the Xavier Institute when a sudden attack forces the X-Men to question who their true allies are. In order to survive, they must form unexpected alliances with former enemies, fundamentally changing the dynamics at the school.
- Uncanny X-Men #462-474: Three-issue story arc titled "Grey's End" had its first issue released on November 23, 2005, and it was later collected on December 11, 2019, as X-Men: Reload by Chris Claremont Vol. 1 & 2: House of M. The storyline centers on Marvel Girl, whose family is placed on an intergalactic wanted list as she tries to save them.
- Wolverine #36–40; A five-issue story arc titled "Origins and Endings," the first issue was released on November 30, 2005, and was later collected on December 13, 2006, as Wolverine: Origins & Endings. The story follows Logan/Wolverine in the aftermath of the events of House of M, where he faces new threats while reflecting on his past actions and deciding how to move forward.
- New Excalibur #1–7: features multiple story arcs: the first one is "Defenders of the Realm," a three-issue arc beginning December 7, 2005; the second is "Choose Your Destiny," a two-issue arc; and the last one is "Black Monday," also a two-issue arc. The series was collected on July 26, 2006, as New Excalibur Vol. 1: Defenders of the Realm.
- X-Factor #1-6: Focused on the formation of X-Factor Investigations, the first issue debuted December 14, 2005, and was later collected August 16, 2006, as X-Factor Vol. 1: The Longest Night.
- X-Men Unlimited #13: Released February 8, 2006, the story focuses on the depowered Mesmero.
- New Avengers (2004) #16-20: Five-issue story arc titled "The Collective", first issue was released on February 15, 2006; and was later collected March 31, 2010 as The New Avengers Vol. 4: The Collective.

=== Tie-in limited series ===
Tie-in limited series that deal with the aftermath of mutants being depowered are:

- Generation M is a five-issue limited series debuted in November 2005, written by Paul Jenkins with art by Ramon Bachs. The series focuses on the consequences faced by mutants who have lost their powers following House of M, it was noted that the series, rather than emphasizing the mutants themselves, centers on Sally Floyd, a reporter for a New York newspaper. The series has been described as providing substance and emotional depth, offering a perspective on the aftermath of House of M that focuses on individual experiences rather than the broader superhero conflicts. The series editor Nick Lowe stated, "It deals with the decimating effects of House of M in a very real, human way. For a lot of these characters, their power was their life. Now that that's gone, what do they do?".
- Sentinel Squad ONE is a five-issue limited series that debuted in November 2005, written by John Layman with art by Aaron Lopresti. The series explores the origin of the Sentinel Squad, detailing how the team came together and became the elite group of soldiers assigned to pilot the Sentinels, whose become a threat to Xavier Institute.
- X-Men: Deadly Genesis is a six-issue limited series that debuted in November 2005, written by Ed Brubaker with art by Trevor Hairsine. The series explores the consequences of the House of M on the "mutant community" and introduces a new enemy connected to Xavier's past. It follows the X-Men, including Cyclops and Wolverine, as they confront this threat while dealing with the aftermath of House of M. The story blends elements of horror and superheroics and marks the 30th anniversary of Giant-Size X-Men #1.
  - Uncanny X-Men: Rise and Fall of the Shi'ar Empire is a hardcover edition released on July 25, 2007, that collected Uncanny X-Men #475-486, continued directly from where Deadly Genesis left off. Focuses on Xavier's past mistakes, his regaining of powers, and a battle against Vulcan and the Shi'ar empire with support from a new X-Men team including Rachel Grey, Warpath, Havok, and Polaris. From here, the story continues in War of Kings, although it became less relevant to the original plotline.
  - What If? X-Men Deadly Genesis an issue released on December 27, 2006, written by David Hine with art by David Yardin, as part of the What If? comic series, this issue explores an alternate reality where Vulcan and his team of X-Men survive their attack against Krakoa.
- X-Men: The 198 is a five-issue limited series released on January 11, 2006, written by David Hine with art by Jim Muniz. The series depicts how the mutants are living after they were depowered, with Xavier's School becoming a safe place for the few remaining mutants, while it also becomes a target for threats.
- Son of M, a six-issue limited series, debuted in December 2005, written by David Hine with art by Roy Martinez. The series follows Quicksilver after the loss of his powers, sister, and purpose. Hated and rejected by both humans and mutants, he drifts through Mutant Town, where he seeks redemption as one of the depowered mutants. He eventually turns to the Inhumans and reunites with his wife, Crystal, in an attempt to restore his powers by stealing the Terrigen Crystals.

=== X-Men: Endangered Species ===
"Endangered Species"
- Cover of X-Men: Endangered Species 1 (Aug 2007), art by Marc Silvestri
- Publisher: Marvel Comics
- Publication date: June – October 2007
- Genre: Superhero; Crossover
Title(s)
New X-Men vol. 2, #40-42
The Uncanny X-Men #488-491
X-Factor vol. 3, #21-24
X-Men vol. 2, #200-204
X-Men: Endangered Species #1
- Main character: X-Men

Creative team
- Writer(s): Mike Carey, Christopher Yost, and Christos Gage
- Artist(s): Scot Eaton, Mark Bagley, and Mike Perkins
- X-Men: Endangered Species: ISBN 0-7851-3012-8
- Softcover edition: ISBN 0-7851-2820-4

"Endangered Species" is a 2008 trade paperback that collects a series of "backup stories", across seventeen issues from different X-Men titles starting in 2007. The storyline, following up on the events of "House of M" and "Decimation," focuses on the Beast, who is trying to find a cure to restore mutants' powers, and the story also explains why some mutants have retained their superpowers. Endangered Species also acts as a prelude to "Messiah Complex".

== Collected editions ==
Title	Material collected	Publication date	ISBN
Decimation: X-Men - The Day After	Decimation: House of M - The Day After, X-Men #177-181	May 2006	ISBN 0-7851-1984-1
Decimation: Generation M	Generation M #1-5	July 2006	ISBN 0-7851-1958-2
Decimation: Son of M	Son of M #1-6	August 2006	ISBN 0-7851-1970-1
Decimation: Sentinel Squad O*N*E	Sentinel Squad O*N*E #1-5	September 2006	ISBN 0-7851-1997-3
Decimation: X-Men - 198	X-Men: The 198 #1-5 and X-Men: The 198 Files	September 2006	ISBN 0-7851-1994-9
New Excalibur, Vol. 1: Defenders of the Realm	New Excalibur #1-7	August 2006	ISBN 9780785118350
X-Factor, Vol. 1: The Longest Night	X-Factor (2005) #1-6.	August 2006	ISBN 9780785118176
Wolverine: Origins & Endings	Wolverine 36–40	December 2006	ISBN 9780785119791
Uncanny X-Men: Rise and Fall of the Shi'ar Empire	Uncanny X-Men #475-486	July 2007	ISBN 9780785125150
The New Avengers, Vol. 4: The Collective	New Avengers #16-20	March 2010	ISBN 9780785119876
New X-Men: Childhood's End, Vol. 1	New X-Men #20-23	January 2019	ISBN 9780785118312
X-Men: Reload by Chris Claremont Vol. 2: House of M	Uncanny X-Men #462-474, Decimation: House of M - the Day After #1, Uncanny X-men Annual (2006) #1	December 2019	ISBN 9781302920531
X-Men: Decimation Omnibus	House of M #8, Mutopia X #5, Decimation: House of M – The Day After, X-Men (1991) #177-179, New X-Men (2004) #20-24, X-Factor (2005) #1-4, Generation M #1-5, Son of M #1-6, X-Men: The 198 #1-5, Sentinel Squad ONE #1-5, New Avengers (2004) #16-20, X-Men Unlimited (2004) #13, and X-Men: The 198 Files	January 2025	ISBN 978-1302960254

== See also ==
- Publication history of Marvel Comics crossover events
- Lists of Marvel Comics publications
