= Northstar (character) =

Marvel Comics fictional character

- Cover to The Uncanny X-Men #392. Art by Salvador Larroca.

Publication information
- Publisher: Marvel Comics
- First appearance: The Uncanny X-Men #120 (April 1979)
- Created by: Chris Claremont (writer); John Byrne (artist)

In-story information
- Alter ego: Jean-Paul Beaubier
- Species: Human mutant
- Team affiliations: X-Men; Children of the Vault; Hydra; Alpha Flight; Secret Defenders; FLQ; Alpha Squadron; Dawn of White Light
- Notable aliases: Jean-Paul Martin
- Abilities: Superhuman speed, durability, and reflexes; Accelerated metabolism; G-Force compensation; Gestalt photokinesis; Photokinesis; Flight; Expert skier

Northstar (Jean-Paul Beaubier) is a fictional superhero appearing in American comic books published by Marvel Comics. Created by Chris Claremont and John Byrne, the character first appeared in The Uncanny X-Men #120 (April 1979) as a member of the Canadian superhero team Alpha Flight.

Northstar is a member of a fictional subspecies of humanity known as mutants, who are born with superhuman abilities. The character possesses the ability to travel at superhuman speeds, fly, and project photonic energy blasts. His twin sister, Aurora, possesses similar abilities. Although the character was initially depicted as a member of Alpha Flight, he has appeared regularly as a member of the X-Men since joining the team of mutants in The Uncanny X-Men #414 (December 2002).

The character is one of the first openly gay superheroes in American comic books, and the first openly gay character to come out in a book published by Marvel Comics. He married his husband, Kyle Jinadu, in Astonishing X-Men #51 (June 2012), which was the first depiction of a same-sex wedding in mainstream comics.

== Publication history ==
=== 1979–1994 ===
Northstar debuted in The Uncanny X-Men #120 (April 1979) as part of the Canadian government sponsored team Alpha Flight, who sought to take Wolverine of the X-Men into custody. In 1983, Alpha Flight went on to star in its own comic, with Northstar as a charter member. In addition to the Alpha Flight comic and associated annuals, Northstar and other members of the team made numerous guest appearances in other titles, particularly Uncanny X-Men and Wolverine. Northstar was also featured in miniseries including two X-Men and Alpha Flight series and Secret Wars II.

Creator John Byrne was reluctant to produce an initial run of the 1983 Alpha Flight comic series for lack of developed and compelling characters. They had no back-stories and were created as nothing more than a team to face the X-Men. So in order to make the team less two-dimensional and more developed, Northstar's sexual orientation was subtly introduced into the start of the new Alpha Flight series. Although Byrne had intended the character to be gay, he was restricted to implied hints of this fact, due to Marvel editor-in-chief Jim Shooter's policy against openly homosexual characters, and by the Comics Code Authority. For example, in Alpha Flight #18, when Northstar's residence is called by Heather Hudson, a half-naked man in swim trunks who had been swimming with Northstar answers the phone, while in Alpha Flight #41, Northstar's sister Aurora says to her brother, "Since when do you object to having attractively-dressed men about, my brother?" Northstar's apparent lack of interest in women was implied to be due to his obsessive drive to win as a ski champion, and writer Bill Mantlo's later attempt to reveal that Northstar had AIDS was squelched. In Alpha Flight #106 (1992), writer Scott Lobdell was finally given permission to have Northstar state, "I am gay."

As the first major, openly gay character created by Marvel Comics, Northstar generated significant publicity in the mainstream press, and Alpha Flight #106 sold out in a week, although the series was not a very popular title. It is the only comic book issue to have been inducted into the Gaylactic Hall of Fame. The event was also controversial, and almost no mention was made of his sexual orientation for the remainder of the first Alpha Flight series, which ended with issue #130 in 1994. One exception was a subplot in which his sister Aurora—experiencing a split personality—accepted his homosexuality in one personality, while rejecting it in the other. After the cancellation of Alpha Flight, Northstar appeared in his own miniseries, which uses his mutancy as allegory and sexuality as subtext. (Note: Multiple allusions are made to Northstar's social anxieties throughout the story that - despite using anti-mutant rhetoric common in X-Men comics - avoid the term "mutant" altogether, leaving room for interpretation. This is most evident in the final issue, wherein the antagonist explains his ultimate motive as a deep resentment for Northstar's "kind" & fear of society accepting them) Interactions between Northstar and other gay characters have been depicted, such as in a Marvel Swimsuit Special, in which he is shown socializing with the gay Pantheon member Hector.

=== 1994–present ===
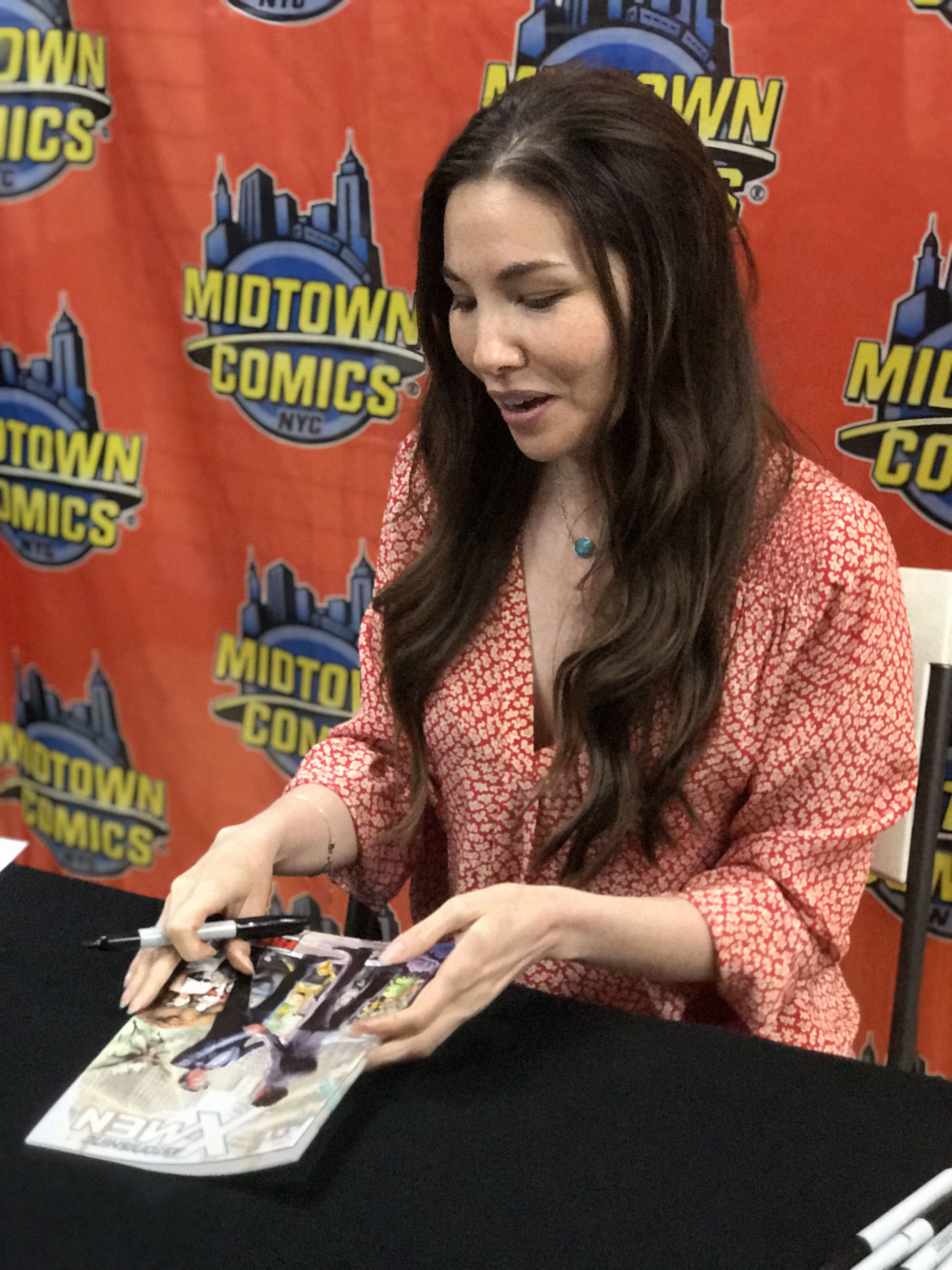
Writer Marjorie Liu autographing a copy of Astonishing X-Men #51 (August 2012), in which Northstar marries Kyle Jinadu, the first same-sex wedding in mainstream comics

After the 1994 cancellation of Alpha Flight, Northstar starred in an eponymous four issue limited series. In 1997, a second on-going series of Alpha Flight was initiated. Northstar was not a member of this group, but appeared in later issues searching for his missing sister Aurora. He featured in eight issues before the series cancellation with issue #20.

In 2005, Marvel killed Northstar in three separate continuities within the space of one calendar month. Between February 16 and March 9, 2005, versions of Northstar were killed in the Earth-616-based Wolverine #25, and in X-Men: Age of Apocalypse and X-Men: The End, which were set in alternate timelines. Northstar did not stay dead long in Marvel's primary continuity, as he was resurrected in Wolverine #26.

When Northstar rejoined the X-Men as a regular member in 2002, writers were less hesitant to address his sexual orientation. Northstar even experienced a crush on long-time X-Man Iceman, though it was unrequited. One of his students in the Alpha Squadron, Victor Borkowski, the gay mutant Anole, looks up to him as a role model. When Northstar rejoined the X-Men yet again in 2009, he was revealed to be in a relationship with his sports company's events manager Kyle. Their relationship faces strain from the remaining mutants' exodus to the mutant island Utopia, though the two agree to work through their issues. It was later implied that he also had a sexual relationship with Hercules at an unspecified point in time.

Northstar and Kyle's marriage in issue #51 of Astonishing X-Men, drew attention from the right-wing group One Million Moms.

== Fictional character biography ==
Jean-Paul Beaubier was born to a French Canadian family in Montreal. After his parents died in an automobile accident during his childhood, he and his twin sister, Jeanne-Marie, are separated. Jean-Paul is adopted, but his adopted parents are killed after only a couple of years. Before his debut as a superhero, Beaubier competed as a professional skier (reaching elite level skier as a teenager, prior to his mutation surfacing). Once he developed his mutant abilities he became virtually unbeatable and eventually bores of the sport due to the lack of competition. He became an angry and rebellious youth. In his young adulthood he joined the Front de libération du Québec (a militant separatist movement for Quebec from Canada) but soon became disgusted with, and renounced, the group's violent tactics. He learned of a superhero group financed by the Canadian government called "Alpha Flight".

=== Alpha Flight ===
Jean-Paul joins Alpha Flight, adopting the codename Northstar. There he is reunited with his sister Jeanne-Marie ("Aurora"). Northstar's comic debut occurs in The Uncanny X-Men #120, as a member of Alpha Flight fighting the X-Men to capture former teammate Wolverine. When Northstar meets his old friend Raymond Belmonde (a man who took him in and mentored him) he introduces Aurora to Belmonde, only for the twins to be attacked by local crime boss Deadly Ernest, who kills Belmonde. The twins deal with the villain, though their relationship sours when Northstar offends Aurora by asking if she had "romanced her way to safety". Aurora refuses to speak to him, and her lover and teammate Sasquatch assists in a power alteration, allowing her to generate light without Northstar. Her attempts to isolate him cause Northstar to quit Alpha Flight. Later, Aurora seeks him out & the twins begin to reconcile, but Aurora rejects him again after discovering his FLQ history. Alpha Flight cross-examine him about his FLQ activities, but are interrupted by an emergency. When Sasquatch dies, the twins reconcile after Northstar comforts his grieving sister. However, during a confrontation with the Hulk, Aurora discovers that her power alterations cause the twins to negate one another's abilities upon touching. After the battle, Northstar rejoins Alpha Flight.

While on a skiing vacation, Northstar must expose his mutant powers to save a woman's life. Accused of using his powers to cheat in competition and realizing he could never know if he subconsciously had, he relinquishes his medals and bitterly turns his back on skiing.

The villain Pestilence senses decay in Northstar's body and causes his sickness to grow serious to the point that his wounds no longer heal, slowly killing him. As his illness progresses, Aurora desperately uses her healing light to cure him. The Asgardian Loki fools the Beaubier twins into believing that their mother was an elf from Asgard. When Aurora is thought lost in action, Northstar travels to Asgard (seeking this heritage) but is trapped there. Loki had sent a depowered Aurora to a convent (in an attempt to appease Those Who Sit Above In Shadow). When a supernatural threat mobilizes Alpha Flight, the sorceress Talisman sends Aurora to Asgard to rescue Northstar. He shares the light with her, restoring their powers (allowing both to independently generate light).

During another battle, Northstar discovers an abandoned baby girl. Doctors discover that she is dying of AIDS, after HIV infection in the womb. Jean-Paul adopts her and names her Joanne Beaubier. Alpha Flight perform various events to remind the public of AIDS and the dangers of silence about it. Her death weeks later spurs Northstar to publicly acknowledge his homosexuality, hoping that, as a gay celebrity, he can increase media attention on HIV/AIDS safety and prevention. Eventually Northstar leaves Alpha Flight and writes a memoir about his experience as a mutant and gay man entitled Born Normal.

=== X-Men ===
In the 2001 "Eve of Destruction" story arc, Northstar is briefly recruited to an improvized team of X-Men by Jean Grey to rescue Professor X, who has been captured by Magneto and is being kept prisoner in Genosha. Jean meets Northstar at a book-signing appearance, where he is mobbed. One person in the crowd turns out to be carrying a gun. Northstar foils his own assassination attempt at super-speed. Later, he meets one of the new mutants, Omerta, whose homophobia leads to a fight between the two on X-Men's mansion driveway.

At Professor Xavier's request, Northstar works with the X-Men to save the life of a mutant child who cannot stop exploding. Despite his speed, Northstar cannot save the boy, who dies because of his powers. Soon afterwards, Northstar officially joins the X-Men, and becomes an instructor at the Xavier Institute, teaching business, economics, French, and superpowered flight classes. Northstar becomes a mentor to the Alpha Squadron training group, forming a close mentor relationship with student Anole.

When Hydra forms an alliance with the cults the Dawn of the White Light and the Hand, the groups start recruiting new agents by killing, resurrecting, and brainwashing superheroes. The X-Man Wolverine is one of their victims, brainwashed into becoming a Hydra assassin. He eventually attacks the X-Men and kills Northstar. Northstar's corpse is stolen by Elektra, another brainwashed victim of Hydra, and resurrected by the Hand.

The Children of the Vault abduct Northstar from a S.H.I.E.L.D. holding facility, to use him to kill Sabretooth and the X-Men. They easily are able to control Northstar due to the Hand's previous mental manipulations. Under their control, he finds his sister about to commit suicide and stops her so that the Children can mentally control her too. Together they attack the school under the Children's command and make quick work of several X-Men, notably Iceman and Anole, whose encounter with Northstar briefly shakes him from mind-control. Leaving Aurora to battle the X-Men, Northstar begins a search for Sabretooth but is stopped by Rogue and Cable. The X-Men take Northstar and Aurora to the S.H.I.E.L.D. Helicarrier to try to fix their mental damage. Using their V.R. equipment the X-Men allow the twins to relive their lives at an accelerated pace. The process is interrupted near the end of the session by Exodus, creating a telepathic connection between the twins. Using each other's emotional support, they face their inner turmoils, gaining increased control of their powers.

=== X-Men split and reformation ===
Northstar is contacted by Cyclops to find Anole (who is in hiding after accidentally attacking his own father due to PTSD from his X-Mansion experiences). Northstar discovers Anole in a tree, the teenager not too happy to see his former mentor. Northstar thinks Victor is having a problem with fitting in, as both a mutant and as a gay teen. Victor explains that his town accepts him for who he is – his problems come from Northstar, along with the other X-Men, for stealing the New X-Men's innocence. Just before departing, he elbows Jean-Paul in the face – similar to how Northstar attacked him in the past – and says that the New X-Men should not look for him.

Northstar and his sister Aurora respond to Emma Frost's telepathic APB and fight alongside the X-Men in San Francisco against the Skrulls when they invade Earth. However, Northstar also makes a life for himself outside of superheroics, having returned to being a star at extreme snowsports, as well as starting his own brand of snow sporting equipment and becoming involved in a relationship. Wolverine approaches Jean-Paul to rejoin the X-Men as its speedster. After confirming that he would not be a token gay member, he accepts. Northstar remains with the X-Men throughout several missions, including confrontations with Norman Osborn's Dark X-Men and a rescue mission to retrieve Illyana Rasputin after she is banished to Limbo.

== Powers and abilities ==
Northstar and Aurora. Art by Leinil Francis Yu.

Northstar is a mutant who can move and fly at superhuman speed with the potential of reaching near light speeds. He also possesses superhuman stamina, endurance (both essential to maintain super-speed for any length of time), and reflexes. He can channel a portion of the kinetic energy of the atomic motion in his body's molecules in a single direction, accelerating his body to a velocity in direct proportion to the amount of kinetic energy he has tapped. Northstar also has an advanced equilibrium, and exceptional agility, reaction time, and coordination which allows for him to make sharp turns, and run at such speeds without becoming sick. Northstar is also able to punch at great speeds, which grants him the ability to hurt even the Hulk. Northstar can create cyclones by running in circles, can run up walls and across water, and can breathe while traveling at supersonic speeds. However, if Northstar wanted to travel with someone else at superhuman speeds, they would need a breathing apparatus to keep from asphyxiating.

As a side effect of partially robbing his molecules of their atomic motion, the binding forces within and between the molecules have increased, which enhances the sheer toughness of Northstar's entire body. This effect gives his skin enough durability to withstand speeds up to at least Mach 10 without injury, but the upper limit of this ability has not been measured. It had once been theorized that Northstar could fly at 99% of the speed of light: 186,282 miles per second (299,792 km/s), although this has never been attempted because he would do irreparable damage to the environment. While Northstar can withstand Mach 10 speeds, traveling any faster would carry complications with breathing and damage caused by wind and air resistance to his body. When Aurora, his sister, and Northstar are in contact with each other, usually by holding hands, they can also vary the rate of acceleration of his molecules to release a cascade of photons creating a momentary burst of light equal to one million candela which they use to blind their opponents. The only other minor drawback to this ability, other than he and his sister having to be in contact with each other to utilize this gift, is that they are unable to adjust the brilliance of the flash. After Northstar is captured by the Children of the Vault, his and Aurora's powers have been enhanced to the point where they can now move at light speed without harm and can generate explosive thermal energy in addition to light.

Northstar is a world-class professional skier, skilled trapeze artist, business man, and an accomplished novelist. He is a native French speaker, he is also fluent in English. He is a proficient melee combatant using a style utilizing his superhuman speed, and received coaching from his teammate Puck. After his resurrection by the Hand, Northstar has been trained in the martial arts. Northstar also has peak human strength, but has superhuman strength in his legs.

Northstar wears a costume of synthetic stretch fabric made of special materials for protection from friction and other hazards of superhuman speed.

== Reception ==
=== Critical reception ===
Stacie Rook of Screen Rant said, "Northstar married his husband in the comics in 2012, in what was the first depiction of a same-sex wedding in Marvel Comics. His position as the first openly gay Marvel character is important for the history of representation, and an on-screen portrayal of him would be a great way to honor that milestone."

=== Volumes ===
The issue of Alpha Flight in which Northstar came out was hugely popular. New York magazine reported that a store on Bleecker Street in New York City resorted to making customers who wanted to buy a copy of it to purchase a second comic as well. Later, they changed the policy to require that everyone who bought a copy had to buy an issue of the series The Punisher War Zone as well. The store claimed they did this to prevent hoarding of the comic. The policy was in effect for thirty minutes until the store was all sold out. In the end, they have received only one complaint.

=== Accolades ===
- In 2014, Entertainment Weekly ranked Northstar 51st in their "Let's rank every X-Man ever" list.
- In 2014, BuzzFeed ranked Northstar 40th in their "95 X-Men Members Ranked From Worst To Best" list.
- In 2016, Screen Rant ranked Northstar and Aurora 8th in their "12 Fastest Superheroes Of All Time" list.
- In 2018, CBR.com ranked Northstar 17th in their "25 Fastest Characters In The Marvel Universe" list.
- In 2019, CBR.com ranked Northstar 8th in their "Alpha Flight: The 10 Most Powerful Members of Canada's Avengers" list.
- In 2020, CBR.com ranked Northstar 7th in their "Marvel: 10 Best Star Athletes Who Became Superheroes" list.
- In 2021, Screen Rant included Northstar in their "10 Fastest X-Men In Marvel Comics" list, in their "10 LGBTQ+ Marvel Heroes That Should Join The MCU" list, and his wedding with Kyle in their "10 Most Important Weddings In Marvel Comics" list.
- In 2022, Newsarama included Northstar in their "20 X-Men characters that should make the jump from Marvel comics to the MCU" list.
- In 2022, Sportskeeda ranked Northstar 3rd in their "5 fastest characters in comic history" list.
- In 2022, CBR.com ranked Northstar 6th in their "X-Men: 10 Queer and Awesome Mutants" list, 7th in their "Marvel: The 20 Fastest Speedsters" list, and 9th in their "10 Most Attractive Marvel Heroes" list.

== Other versions ==
=== Age of Apocalypse ===
Northstar and Aurora in the Age of Apocalypse. Art by Steve Epting.

In the Age of Apocalypse, Northstar and Aurora are part of Mister Sinister's Elite Mutant Force (E.M.F.). When the E.M.F.'s leader, Cyclops, switches sides, secretly helping some inmates to escape, he is caught in the act by the twins. However, both of them are defeated by Cyclops and Polaris, the prisoner he was helping to escape. When the series was revisited for the 10 year anniversary, both Northstar and Aurora are later killed by Weapon X (Wolverine) and Kirika.

=== Marvel Zombies ===
In the Marvel Zombies comics set in the universe of Earth-2149, the zombified Alpha Flight attack the X-Men and are eventually killed by Magneto. Northstar is seen in a panel of Marvel Zombies: Dead Days attacking the X-Man Storm alongside his sister Aurora, only to be killed by Magneto.

=== Ultimate Marvel ===
An alternate universe version of Northstar appears in the Ultimate Marvel imprint. This version is a student at New York City's Stuyvesant High School who was kicked off the school's track team after being suspected of illegally using steroids to enhance his performance. In fact, his unnatural levels of speed are due to his mutant powers. When the X-Men reveal to Northstar that he is a mutant and ask him to join them, he turns them down.

Northstar is later recruited by Emma Frost to join the Academy of Tomorrow, a magnet school for gifted children both mutant and human with a more pacifistic and integrationist philosophy than the X-Men. Along with fellow students Lorna Dane and Alex Summers, he completes Frost's Advanced Leadership Workshop, allowing him to make use of his powers performing off-campus community service missions in conjunction with local authorities. When Lorna is framed for murder and imprisoned in the Triskelion (the headquarters of the Ultimates), in an elaborate scheme by Magneto to help him escape the prison, Northstar is part of the group of Frost's students who try to break her out. During a battle with the Ultimates and the X-Men, Northstar demonstrates the ability to move at superhuman speeds, allowing him to run across water and run up walls.

Northstar is shown to have romantic interest in Colossus. A week after Northstar's battle with the X-Men, it is revealed that he and Colossus have kept in contact. Colossus intends to attend Northstar's homecoming dance, which is interrupted by the Brotherhood. After the supposed death of Charles Xavier, Colossus agrees to temporarily live with Northstar at his school.

During a softball game between the Academy of Tomorrow and the Xavier School, Alpha Flight attacks and captures Northstar. Later, Colossus, Cyclops, Rogue, Angel, Dazzler, and Nightcrawler break into Alpha Flight's base to rescue him. After they incapacitate Alpha Flight, Colossus finds that Northstar has overdosed on the mutant drug Banshee, leaving him paraplegic.

=== X-Men: The End ===
In the alternate future of X-Men: The End, Northstar is one of many members of the staff of the Xavier Institute. He briefly survives the destruction of it and several surrounding miles, only to die in Scott Summers' arms. As he dies, he sees a vision of his Alpha Flight friends, leading is his sister, who encourages him to leave his body.

=== House of M ===
In the alternate reality created by the Scarlet Witch known as House of M, Northstar is an agent of S.H.I.E.L.D., responsible for training a squad of young mutants and superhumans in the agency's junior training squad program. Much like the rest of the super-powered community in House of M, Northstar supported this reality's Magneto and his mutant-supremacy platform.

=== Age of X ===
In the alternate timeline seen in the "Age of X" storyline, Jean-Paul was on the first team of Fortress X defenders to attack Kitty Pryde when she breached the barriers, while Jean-Paul wants revenge for his sister's murder.

=== What If? ===
In "What If Scott Summers and Jean Gray Got Married Sooner?", their leaving inspired the rest of the original X-Men to leave the X-Men as well and seek lives in the outside world. Professor X recruited Northstar as part of a new team, along with Aurora, Storm, Colossus, and Catseye. This new team is killed fighting the living island Krakoa.

In "What If Wolverine was Leader of Alpha Flight?", Northstar was responsible for Wolverine staying in Canada after his capture by government forces. This story diverged from the story in X-Men #120–121, where Alpha Flight was assigned to capture Wolverine and return him to the service of Canada. As in the mainstream reality, the X-Men (Cyclops, Nightcrawler, Storm, Colossus, Banshee and their associate Colleen Wing) flew off, but here, Wolverine did not escape custody and slip aboard the plane. They circled back to attempt a rescue. The Canadian government tried to call Alpha Flight to handle things before they were forced into military intervention, but Northstar was on monitor duty and refused to take the call (presumably in anger that Cyclops had just beaten him in combat before Wolverine surrendered). Left with no other alternative, the Canadian military shot the X-Men down. None of them survived the crash. James Hudson learned what Northstar did and concealed it from Wolverine. Left without his new family, Wolverine chose to return to his first one: Alpha Flight. He led the team well, but Northstar was constantly nervous around Wolverine, fearing his wrath if he ever learned the truth. Wolverine did in fact learn- the team battled the Hellfire Club, and Jean Gray as Dark Phoenix revealed the truth. She wanted Wolverine to kill Northstar, but he killed her instead to free her. He forgave Northstar's role in the deaths of his friends and stayed on as leader of Alpha Flight.

== In other media ==
Northstar as depicted in X-Men: The Animated Series

=== Television ===
Northstar appears in X-Men: The Animated Series, voiced by Rene Lemieux. This version is initially a prisoner of Genosha before being freed by the X-Men and joining Alpha Flight.

=== Video games ===
- Northstar appears in X-Men: Destiny, voiced by Yuri Lowenthal.
- Northstar appears in Marvel Heroes, voiced by Michael Beattie. This version is a teacher at the Xavier Institute.
- Northstar appears as a playable character in Marvel Puzzle Quest.
- Northstar appears as a playable character in Marvel Contest of Champions.
- Northstar appears as a playable character in Marvel Strike Force.

=== Merchandise ===
- In 1999, Northstar received an action figure in ToyBiz's Marvel Collector Editions series as part of a two-pack with Aurora.
- In September 2007, ToyFare magazine ran a poll for characters with prototype figures, such as Northstar, to receive full figures as part of a potential Marvel Legends X-Men line.
- In October 2008, Northstar received a mini-bust as part of a two-pack with Aurora.
- In 2019, Northstar received an action figure in the Marvel Legends line as part of an Alpha Flight boxset.

== See also ==
- LGBTQ characters in comics
