= The Uncanny X-Men: Executions =

The Uncanny X-Men: Executions is a pair of graphic novels by Chris Claremont and Jim Lee published by Boxtree in 1995.

== Contents ==
The Uncanny X-Men: Executions Book One and The Uncanny X-Men: Executions Book Two are the collected reprinted stories that led up to the launch of the new X-Men title and the re-organization of all the X-Men titles published at the time, in two paperback volumes.

== Reception ==
Andy Butcher reviewed The Uncanny X-Men: Executions for Arcane magazine, rating it an 8 out of 10 overall. Butcher comments that "Internal references aren't explained, so much of this could be confusing. These are superb books, but to understand them fully you'll need to buy a lot of back issues. But that's not such a bad idea..."
