= Legion Quest =

Marvel Comics storyline

- Publisher: Marvel Comics
- Publication date: 1994–1995
- Genre: Superhero; Crossover
Title(s)
The Uncanny X-Men #318-321
X-Men #38-41
X-Factor #107-109
Cable #20
X-Men Ashcan #1
What If? #77
- Main character(s): Legion; X-Men

"Legion Quest" is a six-part Marvel Comics crossover event involving the X-Men, published in 1994–1995. It was a prelude to the Age of Apocalypse extended storyline.

== Plot ==
Charles Xavier's illegitimate son Legion, mad that he didn't get to spend time with his dad because his dad was off fighting Magneto, uses his powers to go back in time and kill Magneto not realizing that past Charles was friends with Magneto. Attempting the killing blow he accidentally kills Charles and wipes out the known universe.

== Tie-in issues ==
Prologue X-Factor #109

1. The Uncanny X-Men #320
2. X-Men Vol. 2 #40
3. The Uncanny X-Men #321
4. X-Men Vol. 2 #41

Epilogue Cable #20

== Collected editions ==
Title	Material Collected	Publication Date	ISBN
X-Men: Age of Apocalypse Prelude	X-Factor #108-109; Uncanny X-Men #319-321; X-Men Vol. 2 #38-41; Cable #20; X-Men: Age of Apocalypse Ashcan Edition	June 2011	0785155082
X-Men: Legion Quest	Uncanny X-Men #318–321; X-Men (vol. 2) #38-41, X-Men Annual #3; X-Men Unlimited #4-7; X-Factor #107-109; Cable #20	April 2018	978-1302910389
