= X-Men: Legacy =

Comic book series

- Cover art for X-Men: Legacy #208 (February 2008) by David Finch

Publication information
- Publisher: Marvel Comics
- Schedule: Monthly
- Format: Ongoing
- Publication date: List: X-Men (vol. 2) October 1991 – June 2001 Issues #1 to #113 New X-Men July 2001 – June 2004 Issues #114 to #156 X-Men (vol. 2) July 2004 – January 2008 Issues #157 to #207 X-Men: Legacy February 2008 – October 2012 Issues #208 to #275 X-Men: Legacy (vol. 2) November 2012 – March 2014 Issues #1 to #24, #300
- No. of issues: List: Total: 300 X-Men: 164 New X-Men: 43 X-Men: Legacy: 93
- Main character(s): X-Men; Professor X Rogue; Legion

Creative team
- Created by: Chris Claremont; Jim Lee
- Written by: List: X-Men (vol. 2) Chris Claremont Fabian Nicieza Scott Lobdell Mark Waid Joe Kelly New X-Men Grant Morrison Chuck Austen X-Men (vol. 2) Peter Milligan Mike Carey X-Men: Legacy Mike Carey
- Penciller: List: X-Men (vol. 2) Jim Lee Adam Kubert Carlos Pacheco Alan Davis Leinil Yu New X-Men Frank Quitely Ethan Van Sciver Igor Kordey Phil Jimenez Marc Silvestri Salvador Larroca X-Men (vol. 2) Salvador Larroca Chris Bachalo Humberto Ramos X-Men: Legacy Scot Eaton Daniel Acuña Clay Mann Khoi Pham Javier Baldeon Rafa Sandoval
- Inker: List: X-Men (vol. 2) Scott Williams Mark Pennington Art Thibert Mark Morales New X-Men Prentis Rollins Danny Miki X-Men (vol. 2) Tim Townsend Carlos Cuevas X-Men: Legacy Andrew Hennessy Jay Leisten Jordi Tarragona

X-Men: Legacy is a comic book series published by Marvel Comics featuring the mutant superhero team the X-Men.

The title began its publication in October 1991 as X-Men. From 2001 until 2004 it was published as New X-Men. It reverted from issue #157 to its original title X-Men, but changed again from issue #208 to X-Men: Legacy. Prior to the name change, the series is usually referred to as X-Men (vol. 2) because the first series, Uncanny X-Men, was titled The X-Men prior to 1981. An unrelated ongoing series titled X-Men was released starting in 2010, and is generally referred to as X-Men (vol. 3).

X-Men: Legacy was relaunched in 2012 as part of Marvel NOW! with a new issue #1. The new volume, written by Simon Spurrier, focuses on Legion, son of the recently deceased Professor X, and his mission to preemptively help mutantkind while attempting to get his many personalities under control. The volume ended its run after 25 issues in March 2014, but not before reverting to its original numbering with the final issue, X-Men: Legacy #300.

== Title history ==
Title	First issue	Last issue	Start date	End date
X-Men (vol. 2)	#1	#113	October 1991	June 2001
New X-Men	#114	#156	July 2001	June 2004
X-Men (vol. 2)	#157	#207	July 2004	March 2008
X-Men: Legacy	#208	#275	April 2008	October 2012
X-Men: Legacy (vol. 2)	#1 (#276)	#25 (#300)	November 2012	March 2014

== Publication history ==
=== X-Men (vol. 2) ===
The tetraptych cover of X-Men (vol. 2) #1 (October 1991). Art by Jim Lee and Scott Williams

In 1991, Marvel launched X-Men (vol. 2) as a spin-off of the parent title Uncanny X-Men, with co-writers Chris Claremont and Jim Lee, previously the penciler on Uncanny, moving over to X-Men, while studio mate Whilce Portacio took over penciling duties on Uncanny. X-Men #1 is still the bestselling comic book of all time, with pre-order sales of over 8.1 million copies, according to Guinness Book of World Records, which presented honors to Claremont at the 2010 San Diego Comic-Con. It is estimated that somewhere between 3–4 million copies were actually sold. The sales figures were generated in part by publishing the issue with five different variant covers, four of which showed different characters from the book that combined into a tetraptych image, and a fifth, gatefold cover that combined these four, large numbers of which were purchased by retailers, who anticipated fans and speculators who would buy multiple copies in order to acquire a complete collection of the covers.

Chris Claremont left after three issues due to creative differences with editor Bob Harras. Writers John Byrne and Scott Lobdell handled dialogue to Lee's plotting after Claremont's departure, and Lee himself left the title after issue #11 to form a new company, Image Comics with several other Marvel artists. Various creative teams contributed to the series from 1992 to 2001, with notable writers including Fabian Nicieza, Scott Lobdell, and Joe Kelly, with Chris Claremont returning to the title for a short run ten years after his original departure. Artists included Andy Kubert, and Carlos Pacheco among many others.

Initially, the book focused on the Blue team led by Cyclops, with the other members forming the Gold team led by Storm. This premise has at times faded from mention, only to be resurrected, with the X-Men divided at times into two and even three separate squads. Important events and crossovers covered by the series include the wedding of Jean Grey and Cyclops, X-Cutioner's Song, the Legacy virus, Fatal Attractions, Legion Quest and Onslaught. The series was interrupted and replaced by Amazing X-Men for four issues in 1995 as part of the Age of Apocalypse crossover.

=== New X-Men ===
In July 2001 during a revamp of the X-Men franchise, X-Men (vol. 2) was retitled to New X-Men starting with issue 114, featuring an ambigram logo. Along with these modifications, a new writer, Grant Morrison, was assigned to the title. These changes by the newly appointed Marvel Comics editor-in-chief, Joe Quesada, reflected his idea for flagship titles like X-Men to regain some of their former glory, as well as regaining critical acclaim.

Morrison's tenure on the title dealt with Cyclops, Wolverine, Phoenix, Beast, Emma Frost and Xorn. While the second squad of X-Men in Uncanny continued on as (now undercover) super heroes, Grant Morrison redirected these X-Men's mission to that of teachers. Additionally, New X-Men artist Frank Quitely redesigned the look of the team, giving them sleek, leather / polyester outfits instead of their traditional superhero uniforms for a more contemporary look and feel.

Some more of the long-lasting changes that occurred during Morrison's run were the secondary mutation of Beast to resemble a lion-like rather than his former ape-like appearance, and Emma Frost introduced as a member of the team, recreating the ties between Jean Grey and the Phoenix (retconning the retcon), and the death of Phoenix. The school expanded from simply a training center to a legitimate school with dozens of mutant students, a story idea that was first explored in the X-Men film. One of the more controversial events of New X-Men happened in issue #115 when the island of Genosha and its inhabitants, including Magneto, were completely destroyed. This set the tone that dominated the rest of Morrison's tenure on the book.

In June 2004, Chuck Austen, previously the writer of Uncanny X-Men, moved to New X-Men with issue #155. The title of the series reverted to its original title of X-Men in July 2004 with issue #157 during the "X-Men Reload" event. Peter Milligan became the new writer of the series with issue #166 and was replaced by Mike Carey with issue #188.

=== X-Men: Legacy ===
==== Volume 1 ====
The title was renamed X-Men: Legacy starting in February 2008 with issue #208. The new title reflects a shift in the series direction to focusing on solo X-Men characters versus being a team-based book as the title was previously.

The re-titled series follows on from the conclusion of the Messiah Complex crossover, where Professor X was accidentally shot in the head by Bishop. Shortly after the X-Men presumed him deceased, his body disappeared and his whereabouts were unknown. X-Men: Legacy initially followed the Professor's presumed road to recovery as well as the encounters he faced, such as a battle with the mutant Exodus on the psychic plane and discoveries about his past that include Mr. Sinister.

Many characters have been featured in the title, including Rogue, Magneto, Gambit, and the Acolytes. The title also featured flashbacks relevant to the ongoing present story as well as answered dangling plot lines throughout X-Men continuity.

As of issue #226, Rogue replaced Professor Xavier as the central character. Having now achieved control over her absorption powers, Scott Summers (Cyclops) has repositioned Rogue as mentor to the younger mutants under the protection of the X-Men on Utopia. Rogue is in the unique position to be able to help the students, due to her abilities, allowing fresh insight to their use and control. She has so far, also, been shown to face off against notable deadly adversaries including: Emplate and Proteus. She also took part in the X-Men: Second Coming crossover, acknowledging her special link to Hope.

The title was one of two ongoing books to house the Age of X crossover. The comic briefly followed the fallout from that story and featured a team composed of Rogue, Magneto, Gambit, Professor X, Legion, and Frenzy, but now follows Rogue's team of X-Men affiliated with the Jean Grey School for Higher Learning, featuring Gambit, Frenzy, Cannonball and Rachel Grey.

==== Volume 2 ====
As part of the Marvel NOW! relaunch event, Volume 1 of X-Men: Legacy ended with issue #275. The X-Men: Legacy title was relaunched as a new series with a new issue #1, written by Simon Spurrier and penciled by Tan Eng Huat. The new series focused on Legion, the son of the recently murdered Charles Xavier, who is struggling to keep his multitude of personalities under control while trying to honor his father's legacy by preemptively fighting off threats to mutants using his many powers.

The 25th issue of the volume was renumbered #300 to commemorate the longevity of the series. Issue #300 features a plot by a collaboration between the three X-Men: Legacy writers, Mike Carey, Christos Gage and Simon Spurrier. This is also the final issue of X-Men: Legacy.

A third volume of X-Men: Legacy was planned, to be written by Chris Claremont. However, that series was renamed Nightcrawler after its featured character.

== Relationship with other X-Men titles ==
Since the introduction of X-Men, the plotlines of this series and other X-Books have been interwoven to varying degrees. For most of its run, X-Men has featured a completely different team of X-Men than other titles featuring the X-Men. While it was not uncommon for characters of one book to appear in the other, any major stories concerning characters were dealt with in their own team book.

X-Men and Uncanny X-Men have shared two periods of time where they were more or less treated as a single, fortnightly series. In both of these cases they shared an author: 1995 to 1996 by Scott Lobdell and 1999 to 2000 by Alan Davis. During these times, the plotlines from X-Men and Uncanny X-Men led directly into each other.

In July 2004, the cast of New X-Men was moved to the newly relaunched Astonishing X-Men, and most of the cast of the Uncanny X-Men was transferred to X-Men, vol. 2. With three main X-Men series running concurrently, members from each book continue to appear in the other titles.

== Team roster ==
Title	Issues #	Characters
X-Men (vol. 2)
X-Men (vol. 2)	#1–25 (1991–1993)	Cyclops, Beast, Wolverine, Psylocke, Jubilee, Rogue, Gambit (Blue Team) X-Cutioner's Song crossover (#14-16); Fatal Attractions crossover (#25)
X-Men (vol. 2)	#26–35 (1993–1994)	Cyclops, Beast, Psylocke, Jubilee, Rogue, Gambit, Revanche (Blue Team)
X-Men (vol. 2)	#36–37 (1994)	Phalanx Covenant crossover Generation X forms as Banshee, White Queen, Jubilee, and Sabretooth protect Blink, M, Husk, Synch, and Skin from the Phalanx.
X-Men (vol. 2)	#38–41 (1994–1995)	Cyclops, Beast, Psylocke, Rogue, Gambit, Storm, Jean Grey, Archangel, Iceman, Bishop (Blue and Gold Teams) Legion Quest crossover (#40-41)
X-Men (vol. 2)		Age of Apocalypse event The series was replaced with Amazing X-Men for four months during the event. It consisted of team leader Quicksilver and Storm, Dazzler, Banshee, Iceman, and Exodus
X-Men (vol. 2)	#42–54 (1995–1996)	Cyclops, Beast, Wolverine, Psylocke, Gambit, Storm, Jean Grey, Archangel, Iceman, Bishop, Cannonball Note Uncanny and X-Men (vol. 2) became tightly linked Dark Beast replaced Beast in X-Men Unlimited #10 and started impersonating Beast from Uncanny #331 and X-Men #50
X-Men (vol. 2)	#55–56 (1996)	Onslaught event Cyclops, Beast, Wolverine, Psylocke, Rogue, Gambit, Storm, Jean Grey, Archangel, Iceman, Bishop, Cannonball, Joseph
X-Men (vol. 2)	#55–59 (1996)	Archangel, Beast, Bishop, Cannonball, Cyclops, Gambit, Joseph, Jean Grey, Psylocke, Rogue, Storm, Wolverine
X-Men (vol. 2)	#60–71 (1997)	Cannonball, Cyclops, Jean Grey, Storm, Wolverine
X-Men (vol. 2)	#72–79 (1997–1998)	Beast, Bishop, Cannonball, Cecilia Reyes, Cyclops, Iceman, Joseph, Jean Grey, Maggott, Marrow, Rogue, Storm, Wolverine
X-Men (vol. 2)	#80–93 (1998–1999)	Colossus, Gambit, Marrow, Nightcrawler, Rogue, Shadowcat, Storm, Wolverine
X-Men (vol. 2)	#94–98 (1999–2000)	"The Shattering"/"The Twelve"/"Ages of Apocalypse" crossover
X-Men (vol. 2)	#99 (2000)	All mutants are rendered human by the High Evolutionary and Mister Sinister, leading the X-Men to briefly disband; this issue shows many X-Men characters adjusting to their now-human lives
X-Men (vol. 2)	#100–109 (2000–2001)	Archangel, Colossus, Nightcrawler, Psylocke, Rogue, Thunderbird, Wolverine
X-Men (vol. 2)	#110–113 (2001)	Dazzler, Frenzy, Jean Grey, Northstar, Omerta, Sunpyre, Wraith
New; X-Men	#114–121 (2001–2002)	Beast, Cyclops, Emma Frost, Jean Grey, Wolverine
New; X-Men	#122–134 (2002–2003)	Beast, Cyclops, Emma Frost, Jean Grey, Wolverine, Xorn
New; X-Men	#135–150 (2003–2004)	Beast, Cyclops, Emma Frost, Jean Grey, Wolverine, Xorn; also featured were the following students: Angel Salvadore, Basilisk, Beak, Dust, Ernst, No-Girl, Stepford Cuckoos
New; X-Men	#151–154 (2004)	Cassandra Nova, E.V.A., Tito Jerome Bohusk, Tom Skylark and Rover, Wolverine
New; X-Men	#155–156 (2004)	Beast, Cyclops, Emma Frost, Stepford Cuckoos
X-Men (vol. 2)	#157–164 (2004–2005)	Gambit, Havok, Iceman, Juggernaut, Polaris, Rogue, Wolverine
X-Men (vol. 2)	#165–180 (2005–2006)	Emma Frost, Gambit, Havok, Iceman, Polaris, Rogue, Wolverine
X-Men (vol. 2)	#181–187 (2006)	Cyclops, Emma Frost, Gambit, Havok, Iceman, Mystique, Polaris, Rogue
X-Men (vol. 2)	#188–204 (2006–2007)	Cable, Cannonball, Iceman, Lady Mastermind, Mystique, Omega Sentinel, Rogue, Sabretooth
X-Men (vol. 2)	#205–207 (2008)	"Messiah Complex" crossover
X-Men: Legacy	#208–219 (2008–2009)	Professor X
X-Men: Legacy	#220–225 (2009)	Gambit, Professor X, Rogue
X-Men: Legacy	#226–275 (2009–2012)	Rogue and a rotating line-up
X-Men: Legacy	(vol. 2) #1–24 (2012–2014)	Legion
X-Men: Legacy	(vol. 2) #25 (#300) (2014)	ForgetMeNot

Professor X is the Headmaster of Xavier's School for Gifted Youngsters and mentor to the X-Men, but he is rarely a field operative of the team. In his role as mentor he has typically been present in the book, but he has notable absences, including issues #59–71 (in government custody after the Onslaught crisis) and #99–106 (educating Cadre K in space).

At many times the team roster has been the same as that appearing in Uncanny X-Men and during two periods, the two books have even been treated by their writer as a single bi-weekly title (issues #46–69 by Scott Lobdell and issues #85–99 by Alan Davis).

During issues #90–93 Wolverine was replaced by a Skrull infiltrator, leading to the storylines "The Shattering" and "The Twelve" and the Astonishing X-Men (vol. 2) limited series.

Gambit's group of students appeared prominently in issues #171–174, featuring the debuts of future recurring characters Onyxx and Bling!.

After moving to Utopia in issue #227, Rogue became mentor to the various X-Men-in-training, who regularly appeared in issues alongside her.

== Contributors ==
Regular writers

- Chris Claremont, 1991
- Plots from Jim Lee and scripts by John Byrne or Scott Lobdell, 1991–1992
- Fabian Nicieza, 1992–1995
- Scott Lobdell, 1995–1997
- Joe Kelly, 1997–1999
- Alan Davis, 1999–2000
- Chris Claremont, 2000–2001
- Scott Lobdell, 2001
- Grant Morrison, 2001–2004
- Chuck Austen, 2004
- Peter Milligan, 2005–2006
- Mike Carey, 2006–2011
- Christos Gage, 2012
- Simon Spurrier, 2012–2014

Regular artists

- Jim Lee, 1991–1992
- Andy Kubert, 1992–1996
- Carlos Pacheco, 1997–1998
- Adam Kubert, 1998–1999
- Alan Davis, 1999–2000
- Leinil Francis Yu, 2000–2001
- Frank Quitely, 2001–2003
  - Other artists, including Igor Kordey and Ethan Van Sciver, often illustrated issues because Quitely was running very far behind on deadlines.
- No regular artist, 2003–2004
  - Several illustrators, notably Phil Jimenez and Marc Silvestri, completed brief stints on the book due to deadline complications with previous art teams.
- Salvador Larroca, 2004–2006
- Humberto Ramos, 2006–2007
- Chris Bachalo, 2006–2008
- Scot Eaton, 2008–2009
  - Other artists used for the flashback sequences throughout Xavier's quest include John Romita Jr., Greg Land, Billy Tan, and Mike Deodato.
- Daniel Acuña, 2009
- Clay Mann, 2010
- David Baldeon, 2012
- Tat Eng Huat, 2012–2014

== Collected editions ==
=== Oversized Hardcover / Omnibus collections ===
Title	Material collected	Publication date	ISBN
X-Men: Blue & Gold - Mutant Genesis Omnibus	X-Men #1–16, Annual '92 plus Uncanny X-Men #281-297, Annual'92; X-Factor #84-86; Ghost Rider (vol. 3) #26–27; X-Force #16-18; Stryfe's Strike File #1; material from X-Factor Annual #7, X-Force Annual #1, Marvel Comics Presents #89 and X-Men: Odd Men Out	September 30, 2025	978-1302965365
X-Men by Chris Claremont & Jim Lee Omnibus Volume 2	X-Men #1–9 and material from #10–11 plus Uncanny X-Men #273–280; X-Factor #63–70; Ghost Rider (vol. 3) #26–27	February 2012	978-0-7851-5905-6
X-Men: Bishop's Crossing	X-Men #12–13 and material from #10–11 plus Uncanny X-Men #281–293	October 2012	978-0-7851-5349-8
X-Men: X-Cutioner's Song	X-Men #14–16 plus Uncanny X-Men #294–297; X-Factor #84–86; X-Force #16–18; Stryfe's Strike File	October 2011	978-0-7851-5312-2
X-Men: Shattershot	X-Men #17-24, Annual #1-2 plus Uncanny X-Men Annual #16; X-Men: Survival Guide to the Mansion; X-Men Anniversary Magazine; material from X-Factor Annual #7 and X-Force Annual #1	December 24, 2019	978-1-302-92068-5
X-Men: Fatal Attractions	X-Men #25 plus Uncanny X-Men #298–305, 315; X-Factor #87–92; X-Men Unlimited #1–2; X-Force #25; Wolverine #75; Excalibur #71	April 2012	978-0-7851-6245-2
X-Men: The Wedding of Cyclops & Phoenix	X-Men #26-35 plus Uncanny X-Men #307-310; Avengers (1963) #368-369; Avengers West Coast #101; Cable (1993) #6-8; X-Men Unlimited #3; Uncanny X-Men Annual #18; X-Men: The Wedding Album; What If? #60; The Adventures of Cyclops and Phoenix #1-4; material from Marvel Valentine Special	September 2018	978-1-302-91322-9
X-Men: Phalanx Covenant	X-Men #36–37 plus Uncanny X-Men #306, #311–314 and #316–317; Excalibur #78–82; X-Factor #106; X-Force #38; Wolverine #85; Cable #16	February 2014	978-0-7851-8549-9
X-Men: Legionquest	X-Men #38–41 plus Uncanny X-Men #318–321; X-Men Unlimited #4-7; X-Factor #107-109; X-Men Annual #3; Cable #20	April 24, 2018	978-1-302-91038-9
X-Men: Age of Apocalypse	X-Men #40–41 plus Uncanny X-Men #320–321, Cable #20, X-Men Alpha, Amazing X-Men #1–4, Astonishing X-Men #1–4, Factor X #1–4, Gambit & the X-Ternals #1–4, Generation Next #1–4, Weapon X #1–4, X-Calibre #1–4, X-Man #1–4, X-Men Omega, Age of Apocalypse: The Chosen and X-Men Ashcan Edition #2	March 2012	978-0-7851-5982-7
X-Men: Road to Onslaught Omnibus Vol. 1	X-Men #42-47, Annual '95 plus Uncanny X-Men #322-328, Annual '95; X-Men Prime #1, X-Men Unlimited #8-9; Sabretooth Special #1; Wolverine/Gambit: Victims #1-4; and Starjammers(1995) #1-4	January 14, 2025	978-1302959500
X-Men: Road to Onslaught Omnibus Vol. 2	X-Men #48-52 plus Uncanny X-Men #329-332; X-Men Unlimited #10;Archangel #1; X-Men/Brood #1-2; X-Men & ClanDestine #1-2'; Wolverine (Vol.1) #101; Storm (1996) #1-4; Further Adventures of Cyclops & Phoenix #1-4; Rise of Apocalypse #1-4; Black Knight: Exodus #1; Fantastic Four (Vol. 1) #19; Xavier Institute Alumni Yearbook #1	March 10, 2026	978-1302965488
X-Men/Avengers: Onslaught Omnibus	X-Men #53-57, Annual '96 plus Uncanny X-Men #333-337; Cable #32-36; X-Force #55, #57-58; X-Man #15-19; X-Men Unlimited #11; Onslaught: X-Men, Onslaught: Marvel Universe, Onslaught: Epilogue; Avengers #401-402; Fantastic Four #415; Incredible Hulk (vol. 2) #444-445; Wolverine (vol. 2) #104-105; X-Factor #125-126; Amazing Spider-Man #415; Green Goblin #12; Spider-Man #72; Iron Man #332; Punisher #11; Thor #502; X-Men: Road to Onslaught #1; material from Excalibur #100, Fantastic Four #416	July 14, 2015	978-0-7851-9262-6
X-Men: Onslaught Aftermath Omnibus	X-Men #58-61, Annual '97 plus Uncanny X-Men #338-340, Annual ’96-97; X-Men Unlimited #12-15; X-Factor (Vol. 1) #130; Magneto #1-4; XSE #1-4; Beast #1-3; Juggernaut #1; material from Marvel Holiday Special #1	July 08, 2025	978-1302964191
X-Men: Trial of Gambit Omnibus	X-Men #62-64, -1 plus Uncanny X-Men #341-350, -1; Imperial Guard #1-3; Psylocke & Archangel: Crimson Dawn #1-4; Gambit #1-4; Bishop: Xavier Security Enforcer #1-3; Marvel Fanfare #4-5; Longshot (Vol. 2) #1; material from Marvel Valentine Special #1	July 19, 2026	978-1302968908
X-Men: Operation Zero Tolerance	X-Men #65–70 plus Uncanny X-Men #346; Generation X #26–31; X-Force #67–70; Wolverine (vol. 2) #115–118; Cable #45–47; X-Man #30	April 2012	978-0-7851-6240-7
X-Men vs. Apocalypse: The Twelve Omnibus	X-Men #91-99, Annual '99 (#94, A-story only) plus Uncanny X-Men #371-380, Annual '99; ; X-Men Unlimited #24-26 (#24, A-story only); Astonishing X-Men (vol. 2) #1-3; Wolverine (vol. 2) #145–149; Gambit #8-9; Cable #71-78; X-Man #59-60; X-51 #8; X-Force #101; X-Men Yearbook 1999	February 2020	978-1302922870
X-Men: Revolution by Chris Claremont Omnibus	X-Men #100-109, Annual '00 plus Uncanny X-Men #381-389; X-Men Unlimited #27-29; X-Men: Black Sun #1-5; Bishop: The Last X-Man #15-16; Cable #87	August 2018	978-1-302-91214-7
X-Men: Eve of Destruction	X-Men #110-113, plus Uncanny X-Men #390-393, Annual 2000; X-Men Unlimited #30-33; X-Men Forever (2001) #1-6; Magneto: Dark Seduction #1-4; X-Men: Declassified 1; X-Men: The Search for Cyclops 1-4	July 9, 2019	978-1302918255
New X-Men Vol. 1	New X-Men #114–126 and New X-Men Annual 2001	November 2002	0-7851-0964-1
New X-Men Vol. 2	New X-Men #127–141	November 2003	0-7851-1118-2
New X-Men Vol. 3	New X-Men #142–154	September 2004	0-7851-1200-6
New X-Men Omnibus	New X-Men #114–154 and New X-Men Annual 2001	December 2006	0-7851-2326-1
X-Men: Decimation Omnibus	X-men #177-179 plus House of M 38, Mutopia #5, Decimation: House of M-The Day After, New X-Men #20-24, X-Factor #1-4, Generation M #1-5, Son of M #1-6, X-men: 198 #1-5, Sentinel Squad O*N*E #1-5, New Avengers #16-20, X-Men Unlimited #13, X-Men: 198 Files.	December 24, 2024	978-1-302-96024-7
X-Men: Supernovas	X-Men #188–199 and X-Men Annual (vol. 3) #1	August 2007	0-7851-2514-0
X-Men: Messiah Complex	X-Men #205–207 plus X-Men: Messiah Complex one-shot; Uncanny X-Men #492–494; New X-Men (vol. 2) #44–46; X-Factor (vol. 3) #25–27; X-Men: Messiah Complex—Mutant Files one-shot	April 2008	0-7851-2899-9
Avengers/X-Men: Utopia	X-Men: Legacy #226–227 plus Dark Avengers/Uncanny X-Men: Utopia one-shot; Uncanny X-Men #513–514; Dark Avengers #7–8; Dark Avengers/Uncanny X-Men: Exodus one-shot; Dark X-Men: The Beginning #1–3; Dark X-Men: The Confession one-shot	November 2009	978-0-7851-4233-1
X-Necrosha	X-Men: Legacy #231–234 plus X-Force/New Mutants: Necrosha one-shot; X-Force (vol. 3) #21–25; New Mutants (vol. 3) #6–8	July 2010	978-0-7851-4674-2
X-Men: Second Coming	X-Men: Legacy #235–237 plus Second Coming: Prepare one-shot; X-Men: Second Coming #1–2; Uncanny X-Men #523–525; New Mutants (vol. 3) #12–14; X-Force (vol. 3) #26–28	September 2010	978-0-7851-4678-0
X-Men: Legacy—Legion Omnibus	X-Men: Legacy (vol. 2) #1-24	April 2017	978-1-302-90392-3

=== Trade paperbacks ===
Title	Material collected	Publication date	ISBN
X-Men: Mutant Genesis	X-Men (vol. 2) #1–7	April 2006	0-7851-2212-5
X-Men/Ghost Rider: Brood Trouble in the Big Easy	X-Men (vol. 2) #8–9 plus Ghost Rider (vol. 3) #26–27	December 1993	0-87135-974-X
X-Men: Bishop's Crossing	X-Men (vol. 2) #8 plus Uncanny X-Men #281-293	November 2016	978-1-302-90170-7
X-Men: X-Cutioner's Song	X-Men (vol. 2) #14–16 plus Uncanny X-Men #294–296 (new printing includes #297); X-Factor #84–86; X-Force #16–18	May 1994 (new printing December 2016)	0-7851-0025-3 (new printing 978-1-302-90030-4
X-Men: A Skinning of Souls	X-Men (vol. 2) #17–24; X-Men: Survival Guide to the Mansion; material from Marvel Swimsuit Special #2	December 2013	0-7851-8509-7
X-Men: Fatal Attractions	X-Men (vol. 2) #25 plus X-Factor #92; X-Force #25; Uncanny X-Men #304; Wolverine (vol. 2) #75; Excalibur #71	October 1994	0-7851-0065-2
Avengers/X-Men: Bloodties	X-Men (vol. 2) #26 plus Uncanny X-Men #305; Avengers #368–369; West Coast Avengers #101	April 1995	0-7851-0103-9
X-Men: The Wedding of Cyclops & Phoenix	X-Men (vol. 2) #27–30, Annual #2 plus Uncanny X-Men #308–310, Annual #18; X-Men Unlimited #3; X-Men: The Wedding Album; What If? #60	October 2012	0-7851-6290-9
Origin of Generation X: Tales of the Phalanx Covenant	X-Men (vol. 2) #36–37 plus Uncanny X-Men #316–317; X-Factor #106; X-Force #38; Excalibur #82; Wolverine (vol. 2) #85; Cable #16; Generation X #1	June 2001	0-7851-0216-7
X-Men: Legion Quest	X-Men (vol. 2) #40–41 plus X-Factor #109 and Uncanny X-Men #320–321	March 1996	0-7851-0179-9
X-Men: Prelude to the Age of Apocalypse	X-Men (vol. 2) #38–41 plus X-Factor #108–109; Uncanny X-Men #319–321; Cable #20; X-Men: Age of Apocalypse Ashcan Edition	May 2011	978-0-7851-5508-9
X-Men: Road to Onslaught	X-Men (vol. 2) #42–45; X-Men Annual '95; plus Uncanny X-Men #322–326; X-Men: Prime; X-Men Unlimited #8	February 2014	978-0-7851-8825-4
X-Men: Road to Onslaught Vol. 2	X-Men (vol. 2) #46–49, Annual '95; Uncanny X-Men #327–328; X-Men/Clandestine 1–2; X-Men Unlimited #9; Sabretooth (1995) #1	July 2014	978-0-7851-8830-8
X-Men: X-Babies Classic Vol. 1	X-Men (vol. 2) #46–47 plus Uncanny X-Men Annual #10, 12; Excalibur: Mojo Mayhem	October 2010	978-0-7851-4654-4
X-Men: Prelude to Onslaught	X-Men (vol. 2) #50 plus Uncanny X-Men #333; X-Man #15–17; Cable #32–33	March 2010	978-0-7851-4463-2
X-Men: Road to Onslaught Vol. 3	X-Men (vol. 2) #50–52 plus Uncanny X-Men #329–332; Archangel #1, X-Men/Brood #1–2; X-Men Unlimited #10; Wolverine (vol. 2) #101	Dec 2014	978-0-7851-9005-9
X-Men: Onslaught—The Complete Epic Vol. 1	X-Men (vol. 2) #53–54 plus Uncanny X-Men #334–335; Avengers #400–401; Onslaught: X-Men one-shot; X-Man #18; X-Force #57; Cable #34; Incredible Hulk (vol. 2) #444	January 2008	0-7851-2823-9
X-Men: Onslaught—The Complete Epic Vol. 3	X-Men (vol. 2) #55 plus Uncanny X-Men #336; Cable #35; X-Force #58; Thor #502; X-Man #19; Incredible Hulk (vol. 2) #445; Iron Man #332; Avengers #402; Wolverine (vol. 2) #105	August 2008	0-7851-2825-5
X-Men: Onslaught—The Complete Epic Vol. 4	X-Men (vol. 2) #56-58 plus Fantastic Four #416; Onslaught: Marvel Universe one-shot; Cable #36; Uncanny X-Men #337; Onslaught: Epilogue one-shot; Iron Man #6; X-Men: Road to Onslaught one-shot	December 2008	0-7851-2826-3
X-Men: Trial of Gambit	X-Men (vol. 2) #62-64, -1 plus Uncanny X-Men #341-350, -1	July 2016	1-302-90070-6
X-Men: Zero Tolerance	X-Men (vol. 2) #65–70 plus Wolverine (vol. 2) #115–118; Generation X #27; Cable #45–47; X-Force #67–69	March 2001	0-7851-0738-X
X-Men Gold: Volume 0: Homecoming	X-Men (vol. 2) #70-79 plus X-Men/Dr. Doom Annual 1998; material from X-Men Unlimited #18	March 2018	978-1-302-90954-3
X-Men: The Hunt for Professor X	X-Men (vol. 2) #80–84 and X-Men #1/2 plus Uncanny X-Men #360–365; X-Men Unlimited #22	June 30, 2015	978-0-7851-9720-1
Magneto: Rogue Nation	X-Men (vol. 2) #85–87 plus Magneto Rex #1–3; X-Men: The Magneto War one-shot; Uncanny X-Men #366–367	March 2002	0-7851-0834-3
X-Men: The Magneto War	X-Men (vol. 2) #85–91 and X-Men Annual '99 plus Uncanny X-Men #366–371; Magneto Rex #1–3; X-Men: The Magneto War; X-Men Unlimited #23, material from #24	October 2018	978-1-302-91376-2
Deathlok: Rage Against The Machine	X-Men (vol. 2) #91 and X-Men Annual 99' plus Cable #58–62; Uncanny X-Men #371; Deathlok #1–11	February 2015	0-7851-9291-3
X-Men: The Shattering	X-Men (vol. 2) #92–95 plus Uncanny X-Men #372–375; Astonishing X-Men (vol. 2) #1–3; X-Men 1999 Yearbook	July 2009	0-7851-3733-5
Astonishing X-Men: Deathwish (Apocalypse: The Twelve Prelude)	X-Men (vol. 2) #92 & #95 plus Astonishing X-Men (vol. 2) #1–3; Uncanny X-Men #375	October 2000	0-7851-0754-1
X-Men vs. Apocalypse: The Twelve vol. 1	X-Men (vol. 2) #96–97 plus Uncanny X-Men #376–377; Cable #75–76; Wolverine (vol. 2) #146–147	March 2008	0-7851-2263-X
X-Men vs. Apocalypse: Ages of Apocalypse vol. 2	X-Men (vol. 2) #98 plus X-51 #8; Uncanny X-Men #378, Annual 1999; Cable #77; Wolverine (vol. 2) #148; X-Men Unlimited #26; X-Men: The Search of Cyclops #1–4	October 2008	0-7851-2264-8
X-Men: Powerless	X-Men (vol. 2) #99 plus Cable #78; X-Force #101; Wolverine (vol. 2) #149; Uncanny X-Men #379–380	August 2010	0-7851-4677-6
Avengers/X-Men: Maximum Security	X-Men (vol. 2) #107 plus Maximum Security: Dangerous Planet #1–3; Uncanny X-Men #387; Bishop: the Last X-Man #15; Gambit (1999) #23, X-Men Unlimited (1993) #29; plus more	November 2010	0-7851-4499-4
X-Men: Dream's End	X-Men (vol. 2) #108–110 plus Uncanny X-Men #388–390; Cable #87; Bishop #16	February 2005	0-7851-1551-X
X-Men: Eve of Destruction	X-Men (vol. 2) #111–113 plus Uncanny X-Men #391–393	December 2004	0-7851-1552-8
New X-Men Vol. 1: E Is For Extinction	New X-Men #114–117 and New X-Men Annual 2001	December 2002	0-7851-0811-4
New X-Men Vol. 2: Imperial	New X-Men #118–126	July 2002	0-7851-0887-4
New X-Men Vol. 3: New Worlds	New X-Men #127–133	December 2002	0-7851-0976-5
New X-Men Vol. 4: Riot at Xavier's	New X-Men #134–138	July 2003	0-7851-1067-4
New X-Men Vol. 5: Assault on Weapon Plus	New X-Men #139–145	December 2003	0-7851-1119-0
New X-Men Vol. 6: Planet X	New X-Men #146–150	April 2004	0-7851-1201-4
New X-Men Vol. 7: Here Comes Tomorrow	New X-Men #151–154	July 2004	0-7851-1345-2
New X-Men by Grant Morrison: Ultimate Collection Vol. 1	New X-Men #114–126 and New X-Men Annual 2001	June 2008	0-7851-3251-1
New X-Men by Grant Morrison: Ultimate Collection Vol. 2	New X-Men #127–141	September 2008	0-7851-3252-X
New X-Men by Grant Morrison: Ultimate Collection Vol. 3	New X-Men #142–154	December 2008	0-7851-3253-8
Uncanny X-Men vol. 6: Bright New Mourning	New X-Men #155–156 plus Uncanny X-Men #435–436 and 442–443	August 2004	0-7851-1406-8
X-Men: Day of the Atom	X-Men (vol. 2) #157–165	March 2005	0-7851-1534-X
X-Men: Golgotha	X-Men (vol. 2) #166–170	July 2005	0-7851-1650-8
X-Men: Bizarre Love Triangle	X-Men (vol. 2) #171–174	October 2005	0-7851-1665-6
X-Men/Black Panther: Wild Kingdom	X-Men (vol. 2) #175–176 plus Black Panther (vol. 4) #8–9	February 2006	0-7851-1789-X
Decimation: X-Men—The Day After	X-Men (vol. 2) #177–181 plus House of M: Decimation—The Day After one-shot	May 2006	0-7851-1984-1
X-Men: Blood of Apocalypse	X-Men (vol. 2) #182–187	August 2006	0-7851-1985-X
X-Men: Supernovas	X-Men (vol. 2) #188-199	August 20	0-7851-2319-9
X-Men: Blinded by the Light	X-Men (vol. 2) #200–204	December 2007	0-7851-2544-2
X-Men: Marauders	X-Men (vol. 2) #188-199; #200–204 (A stories), and X-Men Annual (2007) #1	Oct 08, 2018	978-1-302-91377-9
X-Men: Endangered Species	X-Men (vol. 2) #200–204; Uncanny X-Men #488–491; New X-Men (vol. 2) #40–42; X-Factor (vol. 3) #21–24; X-Men: Endangered Species one-shot	????	
X-Men: Messiah Complex	X-Men (vol. 2) #205–207 plus X-Men: Messiah Complex one-shot; Uncanny X-Men #492–494; New X-Men (vol. 2) #44–46; X-Factor (vol. 3) #25–27; X-Men: Messiah Complex—Mutant Files one-shot	November 2008	0-7851-2320-2
X-Men: Legacy—Divided He Stands	X-Men: Legacy #208–212	November 2008	978-0-7851-3001-7
X-Men: Legacy—Sins of the Father	X-Men: Legacy #213–216 plus X-Men: The Unlikely Saga of Xavier, Magneto and Stan one-shot and X-Men: Odd One Out one-shot	February 2009	978-0-7851-3003-1
X-Men: Original Sin	X-Men: Legacy #217–218 plus X-Men: Original Sin one-shot and Wolverine: Origins #28–30	August 2009	978-0-7851-2956-1
X-Men: Legacy—Salvage	X-Men: Legacy #219–225	November 2009	978-0-7851-3876-1
Avengers/X-Men: Utopia	X-Men: Legacy #226–227 plus Dark Avengers/Uncanny X-Men: Utopia one-shot, Uncanny X-Men #513–514, Dark Avengers #7–8, Dark Avengers/Uncanny X-Men: Exodus one-shot, Dark X-Men: The Beginning #1–3, and Dark X-Men: The Confession one-shot	March 2010	978-0-7851-4234-8
X-Men: Legacy — Emplate	X-Men: Legacy #228–230 and X-Men Legacy Annual #1	April 2010	978-0-7851-4115-0
X-Necrosha	X-Men: Legacy #231–234 plus X-Force/New Mutants: Necrosha one-shot; X-Force (vol. 3) #21–25; New Mutants (vol. 3) #6–8	December 2010	978-0-7851-4675-9
X-Men: Second Coming	X-Men: Legacy #235–237 plus Second Coming: Prepare one-shot; X-Men: Second Coming #1–2; Uncanny X-Men #523–525; New Mutants (vol. 3) #12–14; and X-Force (vol. 3) #26–28	June 2011	978-0-7851-5705-2
X-Men: Legacy—Collision	X-Men: Legacy #238–241	September 2011	978-0-7851-4669-8
X-Men: Legacy—Aftermath	X-Men: Legacy #242–244, 248–249	February 2012	978-0-7851-5636-9
X-Men: Age of X	X-Men: Legacy #245–247, New Mutants (vol. 3) #22–24, Age of X: Alpha, Age of X: Universe #1–2	July 2011	978-1-84653-490-4
X-Men: Legacy—Lost Legions	X-Men: Legacy #250–253	April 2012	978-0-7851-5292-7
X-Men: Legacy—Five Miles South of the Universe	X-Men: Legacy #254–260	September 2012	978-0-7851-6068-7
X-Men: Legacy—Back to School	X-Men: Legacy #260.1, 261–265	January 2013	978-0-7851-6191-2
X-Men: Legacy—AVX	X-Men: Legacy #266–275	April 2013	978-0-7851-6587-3
X-Men: Legacy Vol. 1 - Prodigal	X-Men: Legacy (vol. 2) #1–6	March 2013	978-0-7851-6249-0
X-Men: Legacy Vol. 2 - Invasive Exotics	X-Men: Legacy (vol. 2) #7–12	September 2013	978-0-7851-6718-1
X-Men: Legacy Vol. 3 - Revenants	X-Men: Legacy (vol. 2) #13–18	November 2013	978-0-7851-6719-8
X-Men: Legacy Vol. 4 - For We Are Many	X-Men: Legacy (vol. 2) #19–24	April 2014	978-0-7851-5432-7

=== Thick trade-paperbacks (Complete/Ultimate Collections) ===
Title	Material collected	Publication date	ISBN
X-Men by Peter Milligan, Vol. 1: Dangerous Liaisons	X-MEN (1991) #166-176, BLACK PANTHER (2005) #8-9	2019	978-1-302-91650-3
X-Men by Peter Milligan, Vol. 2: Blood of Apocalypse	Cable & Deadpool #26-27 and X-MEN (1991) #177-187	March 22, 2022	978-1-302-93090-5

=== Standard Hardcover collections ===
Title	Material collected	Publication date	ISBN
X-Men: Mutant Genesis	X-Men #1–7	July 2010	978-0-7851-4672-8
X-Men: Legacy—Divided He Stands	X-Men: Legacy #208–212	August 2008	0-7851-3000-4
X-Men: Legacy—Sins of the Father	X-Men: Legacy #213–216 plus X-Men: The Unlikely Saga of Xavier, Magneto and Stan one-shot; X-Men: Odd One Out one-shot	November 2008	978-0-7851-3002-4
X-Men: Original Sin	X-Men: Legacy #217–218 plus X-Men: Original Sin one-shot; Wolverine: Origins #28–30	January 2009	978-0-7851-3038-3
X-Men: Legacy—Salvage	X-Men: Legacy #219–225	August 2009	978-0-7851-4173-0
X-Men: Legacy—Emplate	X-Men: Legacy #228–230 and X-Men Legacy Annual #1	March 2010	978-0-7851-4020-7
X-Men: Legacy—Collision	X-Men: Legacy #238–241	February 2011	978-0-7851-4668-1
X-Men: Legacy—Aftermath	X-Men: Legacy #242–244, 248–249	August 2011	978-0-7851-5635-2
X-Men: Age of X	X-Men: Legacy #245–247; New Mutants #22–24; Age of X: Alpha	July 2011	978-0-7851-5289-7
X-Men: Legacy—Lost Legions	X-Men: Legacy #250–253	October 2011	978-0-7851-5291-0
X-Men: Legacy—Five Miles South of the Universe	X-Men: Legacy #254–260	March 2012	978-0-7851-6067-0
X-Men: Legacy—Back to School	X-Men: Legacy #260.1; 261–265	July 2012	978-0-7851-6397-8
