= Magneto (Marvel Comics) =

Marvel Comics character

- Variant cover of X-Men: Black - Magneto #1 (September 2018). Art by J. Scott Campbell.

Publication information
- Publisher: Marvel Comics
- First appearance: The X-Men #1 (September 1963)
- Created by: Stan Lee (writer); Jack Kirby (writer/artist)

In-story information
- Alter ego: Max Eisenhardt
- Species: Human mutant
- Place of origin: Earth
- Team affiliations: Brotherhood of Mutants; X-Men; New Mutants; Hellfire Club; Acolytes; Astonishing Avengers; Quiet Council of Krakoa; Great Ring of Arakko
- Notable aliases: Magnus; Erik Lehnsherr; White King (later Grey King) of the Hellfire Club; Michael Xavier; Erik the Red; Henryk Gurzsky; White Pilgrim
- Abilities: Magnetism manipulation; Astral projection; Psychic shield via helmet; Genius-level intelligence

Magneto (/mæɡˈniːtoʊ/) is a character appearing in American comic books published by Marvel Comics, commonly in association with the X-Men. Created by writer Stan Lee and artist/co-writer Jack Kirby, the character first appeared in The X-Men #1 (cover-dated September 1963) as an adversary of the X-Men. Magneto is a powerful mutant, one of a fictional subspecies of humanity born with superhuman abilities; his mutant power is the ability to generate and control magnetic fields.

Introduced as a villainous mutant using his powers to terrorize humanity, writers have since fleshed out his origins and motivations. These later stories established Magneto as a Holocaust survivor, born Max Eisenhardt (alias: Erik Lehnsherr German pronunciation: [ˈeːʁɪk ˈleːnshɛʁ] and Magnus). His extreme methods and cynical philosophy derive from his "never again" determination to protect mutants from suffering the same fate as the Jews at the hands of a world that fears and persecutes them.

Magneto's backstory further establishes him to have once been a friend of Professor X, the leader of the X-Men, but their differing philosophies caused a rift in their friendship. His role in comics has progressed from supervillain to antihero and eventually superhero, having served as an occasional ally of the X-Men. He even led the New Mutants for a time as headmaster of the Xavier School for Gifted Youngsters, and was eventually recognized as a fully-fledged member of the X-Men. Writer Chris Claremont, who created Magneto's backstory, compared the character to then-Israeli opposition leader Menachem Begin, with later commentators comparing the character with the American civil rights leader Malcolm X and Jewish Defense League founder Meir Kahane.

The character has been adapted from the comics into other forms of media. Magneto appears in X-Men: The Animated Series (1992–1997), voiced by David Hemblen, and its revival X-Men '97 (2024–present), voiced by Matthew Waterson. Ian McKellen and Michael Fassbender have portrayed Magneto in 20th Century Fox's X-Men film series (2000–2019), with McKellen set to reprise the role in the Marvel Cinematic Universe (MCU) film Avengers: Doomsday (2026). In 2014, IGN ranked Magneto 1st in their "Top 100 Comic Book Villains" list.

== Publication history ==
X-Men #1 (Sept. 1963) is Magneto's first appearance. Written by Stan Lee and art by Jack Kirby.

Magneto first appeared in the debut issue of The X-Men in 1963. Since the 1960s, Magneto has appeared in The Uncanny X-Men, X-Men, Astonishing X-Men, Alpha Flight, Cable, Excalibur, The New Mutants, various X-Men miniseries, and many other Marvel titles. His first solo title was a one-shot special, Magneto: The Twisting of a Soul #0 (Sept. 1993), published when the character returned from a brief absence; it reprinted Magneto-based stories from Classic X-Men #12 and 19 (Aug. 1987 and March 1988), by writer Chris Claremont and artist John Bolton.

When asked about his approach to Magneto, Jack Kirby stated, "I saw my villains not as villains. I knew villains had to come from somewhere and they came from people. My villains were people that developed problems." In a 2008 interview, Stan Lee said he "did not think of Magneto as a bad guy. He just wanted to strike back at the people who were so bigoted and racist...he was trying to defend the mutants, and because society was not treating them fairly he was going to teach society a lesson. He was a danger of course...but I never thought of him as a villain." In the same interview, he also revealed that he originally planned for Magneto to be the brother of his nemesis Professor X.

Writer Chris Claremont stated that Menachem Begin was an inspiration for Magneto's development, as David Ben-Gurion was for Professor X. "There's a lot of talk online now that Magneto stands in for Malcolm X and Xavier stands in for Martin Luther King, which is totally valid but for me, being an immigrant white, to make that analogy felt incredibly presumptuous. An equivalent analogy could be made to [Israeli prime minister] Menachem Begin as Magneto, evolving through his life from a terrorist in 1947 to a winner of the Nobel Peace Prize 30 years later."

Asked about the Malcolm X/Martin Luther King Jr. parallels, Claremont also said "It was too close [in the 1970s]. It had only been a few years since the assassinations. In a way, it seemed like that would be too raw. My resonance to Magneto and Xavier was borne more out of the Holocaust. It was coming face to face with evil, and how do you respond to it? In Magneto's case it was violence begets violence. In Xavier's it was the constant attempt to find a better way... As we got distance from the '60s, the Malcolm X-Martin Luther King-Mandela resonance came into things. It just fit."

Magneto's first original title was the four-issue miniseries Magneto (Nov. 1996-Feb. 1997), by writers Peter Milligan and Jorge Gonzalez, and penciller Kelley Jones. In the miniseries, Magneto was apparently de-aged and suffered from amnesia, calling himself Joseph; Joseph was later revealed to be a young clone of Magneto. Later, Magneto became ruler of the nation Genosha and then appeared in two miniseries; Magneto Rex (written by Joe Pruett and drawn by Brandon Peterson) and Magneto: Dark Seduction (written by Fabian Nicieza and drawn by Roger Cruz).

A trade paperback novel detailing Magneto's childhood, X-Men: Magneto Testament was written by Greg Pak and released in September 2008. Pak based Magneto Testament on accounts from Holocaust survivors. Before the publication of X-Men: Magneto Testament, Magneto's personal background and history were invented in The Uncanny X-Men #150 (Aug. 1981). He was portrayed as a Holocaust survivor; while searching for his wife Magda, a Sintesa, Magneto maintained a cover identity as a Sinto. This created confusion among some readers as to Magneto's heritage, until his Jewish background was confirmed in Magneto: Testament.

== Fictional character biography ==
=== Early life ===
(Left) Max and Magda escape from the Auschwitz-Birkenau death camp; (Right) Max and Magda with their daughter Anya. Art from X-Factor Annual #4 (1989) by John Byrne.

Max Eisenhardt was born in the late 1920s to a middle-class German Jewish family. Max's father, Jakob Eisenhardt, was a decorated World War I veteran. Surviving discrimination and hardship during the Nazi rise to power, the passing of the Nuremberg Laws in 1935, and Kristallnacht, Max and his family fled to Poland, where they were captured during the German invasion of Poland and sent to the Warsaw Ghetto. Max and his family escaped the ghetto, only to be betrayed and captured again. His mother, father, and sister were executed and buried in a mass grave, but Max survived, possibly due to the manifestation of his mutant powers. Escaping from the mass grave, he was ultimately captured yet again and sent to Auschwitz, where he was branded with the inmate number 214782 and eventually became a Sonderkommando. While at Auschwitz, Eisenhardt reunited with a Romani girl named Magda, with whom he had fallen in love when he was younger, and they escaped the concentration camp during the October 7, 1944 revolt.

Following the war, he and Magda moved to the Ukrainian city of Vinnytsia, and Max adopted the name "Magnus". Magda and Magnus had a daughter named Anya and lived uneventfully until an angry mob, spurred on by the first manifestation of Magnus's powers, burned down their home with Anya still inside. Magnus was enraged at the mob for preventing him from rescuing Anya, and his powers were unleashed, killing the mob and destroying a part of the city. Magda, terrified at Magnus's power, left him and later gave birth to the mutant twins Pietro and Wanda before she died. Wanted by the authorities for the deaths and destruction in Vinnytsia, and while searching for Magda, Magnus paid a Romanian forger, Georg Odekirk, to create the cover identity of "Erik Lehnsherr, the Sinte gypsy". "Erik" moved to Israel, where he met and befriended Charles Xavier while working at a psychiatric hospital near Haifa, where Gabrielle Haller lived. There, the two debated the consequences humanity faced with the rise of mutants, though neither revealed to the other that they were mutants. However, they were forced to reveal their inherent abilities to one another while facing Baron Strucker and Hydra. After the battle, Erik, realizing that his and Xavier's views were incompatible, left with a cache of hidden Nazi gold, which provided him with the finances to pursue his goals.

=== Rise of Magneto ===
Magneto's experiences during the Holocaust (Nazi Germany, Auschwitz, and Vinnytsia) shaped his outlook on the situation that mutants face in the Marvel Universe. Determined to keep such atrocities from ever being committed against mutantkind, he is willing to use deadly force to protect mutants. He believes that mutants ("Homo superior") will become the dominant life form on the planet and he sets about either creating a homeland on Earth where mutants can live peacefully, or conquering and enslaving humanity in the name of mutantkind.

Magneto's first villainous act is attacking a United States military base called Cape Citadel after bringing down missiles. He is driven off by Charles Xavier's mutant students, the X-Men, in their first mission. He creates Asteroid M, an orbital base of operations in a hollowed-out asteroid. He then gathers a group of angry and disillusioned mutants including his own, albeit at the time unbeknown to him, son and daughter Quicksilver and the Scarlet Witch, and formed the Brotherhood of Evil Mutants to further his goals. Magneto briefly conquers the South American nation of San Marco in the hopes of establishing a mutant homeland there, but is again foiled by the X-Men. He tries to make the Toad infiltrate the X-Men. When that fails, he captures the Angel and tries to force him to tell the secrets of the X-Men. However, the other X-Men rescue their member and destroy Asteroid M.

Magneto is captured by the Stranger, a powerful alien being, whom he initially thought was another powerful mutant. The Stranger encases Magneto and Toad in a special cocoon and spirits them away to another planet, the Stranger's laboratory world. Back on Earth, Magneto's Brotherhood splinters, and Quicksilver and Scarlet Witch desert him. Magneto escapes to Earth by repairing a spaceship on the Stranger's planet, but leaves the Toad behind. He captures nearly all the X-Men and takes over the Mansion, hoping to use the Angel's parents to create a race of mutants, but is recaptured by the Stranger. Magneto remains on the Stranger's world for a time, but escapes again thanks to the unwitting assistance of scientist Dane Whitman, makes his way back to Earth, and reassembles the Brotherhood of Evil Mutants with the exception of the mutant Mastermind.

Magneto later reorganizes the Brotherhood, and fights Professor X and the Defenders. Using ancient and advanced alien technology he found near the core of the earth, Magneto creates the artificial humanoid "Alpha the Ultimate Mutant". Alpha rebels against his creator and reduces him to infancy. Magneto is then placed in the care of Xavier's former love interest, Professor Moira MacTaggert at Muir Island. At Muir Island, MacTaggert discovers that the prolonged and extensive use of Magneto's powers has a disruptive effect on his nervous system and psyche, causing him to become increasingly paranoid and irrational the more he uses them. In an attempt to cure him of this flaw, she manipulates the infant Magneto's genetic code, so that when he grows older, he will be able to safely use his powers while still remaining rational, to prevent him from becoming "evil" in adulthood. However, her genetic tampering soon loses its effect when Magneto reactivates his powers since the very use of his powers causes his genetic sequence to realign and "reset" to its original state. Magneto is eventually restored to adulthood, but to his physical prime rather than his older, chronological age, by the alien Shi'ar agent Erik the Red.

Magneto later gathers a new Brotherhood of Evil Mutants, and with them battles Captain America. He then successfully opposes Doctor Doom's conquest of Earth.

=== Reformation ===
Magneto goes on trial for his crimes in Uncanny X-Men #200. Art by John Romita Jr.

Magneto's first steps towards a change in character begin during an encounter with the X-Men, when he lashes out in anger and nearly kills Kitty Pryde, stopping short when he sees that the X-Man that he attacked is a Jewish child — precisely the kind of person he claimed he was fighting to make a better world for. Realizing that he has come to regard the lives of those who oppose him to be as worthless as the Nazis considered his people to be, Magneto stands down and leaves the scene; though most of the X-Men are dismayed that he escaped, Xavier expresses hope that the encounter might prove a turning point for his former friend.

Magneto later discovers that former Brotherhood members the Scarlet Witch and Quicksilver are actually his children, simultaneously learning about their recent marriages to the Vision and Crystal. He reveals to Quicksilver and the Scarlet Witch that he is their father. He also discovers his granddaughter, Quicksilver's human child Luna Maximoff. Seeing Luna as a bond to the human race he has rejected, Magneto tries to reach out to his children. Angered by his rejection of them and their mother, they push him away and refuse to forgive him.

Magneto finds himself allied with Professor Xavier and the X-Men when a group of heroes and villains are abducted by the Beyonder, a nearly omnipotent alien being. This entity took them to a planet he created called the Battleworld to participate in a personal experiment of his to observe the concept of the battle between good and evil which would later be known as the Secret Wars. The characters were sorted according to their desires; Magneto was placed with the heroes as his desires were based on a wish to help mutants rather than the more selfish drives of the other villains. This surprises many of the other heroes, who still believe him to be a villain, although eventually they come to accept him as an ally. Captain America even speaks in his defense on some occasions, and the Wasp develops a certain affection for him, although it is tempered by her knowledge of his past.

After the Secret Wars, Magneto is transported back to his base, Asteroid M. The alien Warlock, traveling to Earth, collides into the asteroid, breaking it to pieces. Magneto falls towards Earth and into the Atlantic Ocean, sustaining serious injuries. He is rescued by Lee Forrester, the captain of a fishing trawler. Lee takes him to the same island in the Bermuda Triangle where he had once held her captive; there she helps him recuperate from his injuries, and the two become lovers.

After recuperating from his injuries, Magneto is asked to aid the X-Men in battling the returned Beyonder. Magneto stays with the X-Men even after the Beyonder is defeated. His association with the team softens his views on humanity, and Magneto surrenders himself to the law to stand trial for his crimes. A special tribunal dismisses all charges against Magneto from prior to his "rebirth", deeming that this had constituted a figurative death of the old Magneto. However, the tribunal is interrupted by an attack from Fenris, the twin children of Baron Strucker. Professor X, brought to near death due to the strain of the battle and previously sustained injuries, asks Magneto to take over his school and the X-Men. Magneto agrees and chooses not to return to the courtroom. Instead, he takes over Xavier's school under the assumed identity of Michael Xavier, Charles Xavier's cousin. Seeing him try to reform, the Scarlet Witch and Quicksilver begin accepting him as their father.

Though Magneto makes a substantial effort as the headmaster of the New Mutants and an ally to the X-Men, his tenure is disastrous. His responsibilities to the school force him to separate from Lee, who he felt would have been a strong guiding hand and emotional support. The Beyonder plagues him yet again, slaying Xavier's current students, the New Mutants, and bringing them back to life soon after. This deeply traumatizes the entire group. Magneto is then manipulated by Emma Frost into battling sanctioned heroes the Avengers and the Supreme Soviets. Magneto submits to a trial once again, but uses mind-control circuitry he salvaged from the wreckage of Asteroid M to alter the opinions of the head justice in charge of the trial. As a result, Magneto is finally absolved of his past crimes but finds that this only fuels hostility towards mutants. Feeling that desperate measures need to be taken after the genocidal massacre in the Morlock tunnels, Magneto and Storm join the Hellfire Club jointly as the White King.

His relationship with the New Mutants deteriorates even further when they see him and the Hellfire Club negotiating with the demons of the Inferno incident. Magneto later ousts longtime Hellfire Club co-chair Sebastian Shaw to establish himself as the head of the Hellfire Club. To win the support of the other Club members against Shaw, he claims that his reformation was all a pretense to use the X-Men and New Mutants as pawns in a long-term scheme to take over the world. In response, the New Mutants, who had already decided to leave Magneto's tutelage, declare themselves his enemies.

Seeing conditions for mutants grow progressively more perilous, Magneto begins seeking allies to protect mutants from humanity. He participates in the Acts of Vengeance alongside such established villains as Doctor Doom, the Wizard, the Mandarin, and the Red Skull. His temporary alliance with the Red Skull — an unrepentant Nazi war criminal — is a highly uneasy one. After confirming that the Skull was the original one who had worked with Adolf Hitler, Magneto takes revenge upon him by entombing him alive. When Zaladane is able to appropriate the magnetic powers of Polaris, Magneto works alongside Rogue, Ka-Zar, and the American intelligence agent Nick Fury as well as a number of Russian operatives to reestablish peace in the Savage Land. This leads to an altercation with Zaladane, who appropriated Magneto's magnetic powers in addition to those of Polaris. The conflict ends with Magneto reclaiming his powers and executing Zaladane himself. With her death, Magneto renounces his previous efforts to act as a mentor to the New Mutants and to follow Xavier's beliefs in peaceful co-existence between mutants and normal humans.

=== Avalon and Genosha ===
Tired of the constant strife, Magneto rebuilds his orbital base and retires to a life of quiet seclusion. At this point, he is a figurehead for the cause of mutantkind and is sought out by a group of mutants calling themselves the Acolytes, who pledge their service and allegiance to him. Under the influence of one of them, Fabian Cortez, he declares Asteroid M a homeland for mutantkind, obtaining nuclear missiles from a Soviet submarine he had previously destroyed and placing them around the asteroid pointed towards Earth.

Magneto discovers how Moira MacTaggert altered his genetic structure when he was de-aged. Enraged, he kidnaps Moira and subjects her to torture, later forcing her to use the same procedure that was used on him to alter the minds of some of the X-Men. However, when the remaining X-Men attack Asteroid M to rescue Moira and stop Magneto's plans, the Soviets launch a particle beam satellite that destroys Asteroid M and the procedure wears off; Moira had learned long ago that her procedure did not work because a mutant's natural physiology relies on their bodies operating in a precise manner, with use of their powers restoring them to normal, and so Magneto had genuinely reformed. Betrayed and abandoned by Cortez, who had revealed Moira's actions to him to try and provoke Magneto into bringing mutants together to serve as a martyr for Cortez's own cause. Magneto refuses Xavier's pleas to escape with the X-Men back to Earth. Instead, the Acolyte Chrome encases him in a protective shell, saving him from the subsequent explosion. However, Chrome and the other Acolytes die.

The United Nations Security Council, in response to a resurgent Magneto, votes to activate the "Magneto Protocols" — a satellite network, in a slightly lower orbit than Avalon, that skews the Earth's magnetic field enough to prevent Magneto from using his powers within, preventing him from returning to the planet's surface. In response, Magneto generates an electromagnetic pulse not only destroying the satellites, but deactivating every electric device on Earth within minutes. The X-Men respond by hacking into Avalon's own computer systems to teleport a small team to the station with the aid of Colossus (who joined Magneto's Acolytes moments after his younger sister Illyana's funeral). Magneto, during the battle with the X-Men, rips the adamantium from Wolverine's bones, which enrages Xavier to the point that he wipes his former friend's mind, leaving him in a coma. This action later leads to the creation of Onslaught, an omnipotent being formed from the combination of Xavier and Magneto's own dark sides, the darkness in Magneto's soul latching on to its counterpart in Xavier when he launched such a devastating assault. Magneto remains comatose on Avalon, worshiped by his Acolytes under the leadership of the ancient mutant Exodus, until Avalon itself is destroyed by the arrival of Holocaust from the Age of Apocalypse Earth. During the destruction, Colossus places Magneto in an escape pod sending him back to Earth. This pod is intercepted by Astra, a former ally who now desires his death.

After cloning Magneto, Astra restores Magneto's memories and powers before attempting to kill him. Instead, Magneto, now fully revived, battles both Astra and his clone. Magneto triumphs over the clone, sending him crashing into a South American barn. However, too weak to continue the battle, the real Magneto goes into hiding, while the now-amnesiac clone becomes known as Joseph (christened as such by the nun who discovered him) and eventually joins the X-Men. Since the world believes Joseph to be the real Magneto, Magneto takes his time to plan. He engages in a pair of brief diversions, first posing as "Erik the Red" and revealing Gambit's past crimes to the X-Men, resulting in Gambit's expulsion from the group. Then he kills George Odekirk, the forger that created his "Erik Lehnsherr" alias, to prevent his true identity from being discovered.

Following this, Magneto constructs a machine to amplify his powers and blackmail the world into creating a mutant nation. The X-Men and Joseph, who had fallen under Astra's control again, oppose him. Magneto's powers are severely depleted from battling Joseph, who sacrifices his life to restore the Earth to normal. However, the United Nations, manipulated by its mutant affairs officer Alda Huxley, cedes to Magneto the island nation of Genosha, which had no recognized government. He rules Genosha for some time with the aid of many who had previously opposed him, including Quicksilver, Polaris, and Fabian Cortez, and engages in a brutal civil war with the island's former human rulers.

Despite the UN's hopes that Genosha's civil war between humans and mutants would destroy or at least occupy him, Magneto crushes all opposition to his rule and rebuilds the nation by forming an army of mutants dedicated to his cause, including mutants coming from all over the world seeking sanctuary. Eventually, Magneto uses the Genegineer's equipment to fully restore his power. Intending to declare war on humanity, he captures Professor X to use as a symbol with which to rally his troops. Jean Grey recruits a new group of X-Men to help Cyclops and Wolverine rescue Xavier; they defeat Magneto when Xavier psychically cuts off his access to his powers. Taking the opportunity for revenge, Wolverine attacks the depowered Magneto, crippling him with serious injuries.

==== The destruction of Genosha ====
While Magneto recovers from his injuries, Genosha is attacked by an army of Sentinels sent by Xavier's long lost twin sister Cassandra Nova Xavier. Over 16 million mutants and humans die. The attack comes just after Polaris (one of the survivors) discovered the truth about her biological relationship as Magneto's daughter. Magneto's supposedly last moments are spent revealing to Genosha Polaris' status as his daughter.

Charles Xavier is met on Genosha by Magneto, who apparently survived Cassandra Nova's attack and lived unnoticed within the ruins. Xavier and Magneto put aside their differences to rebuild the island nation, rekindling their friendship in the process.

==== House of M ====
The House of Magnus, from left to right: Quicksilver, Scarlet Witch, her two children William and Thomas, Magneto, and Polaris.

During the House of M storyline, Magneto's daughter Wanda suffers a mental breakdown over the loss of her children and starts to warp reality to recreate them, until Doctor Strange put her into a coma to stop her. In Genosha, Magneto hears Wanda's psychic cry for help and creates a wormhole, whisking her away before the Avengers are able to stop her. Magneto tends to Wanda, increasingly becoming more withdrawn and angry. He allows only Xavier to visit, in the belief that Xavier can help Wanda. After months of failed attempts, the X-Men and the Avengers meet to decide what should be done. When some of the members suggest killing Wanda, Quicksilver informs Magneto of this development, before convincing Wanda to warp reality into the House of M. In the new reality, where the New Avengers, the X-Men, and the members of Wanda's family all received their 'heart's desires', Magneto was attacked by Sentinels over Manhattan in 1979, and revealed an alleged international anti-mutant conspiracy involving Richard Nixon. This resulted in Magneto being granted sovereignty over Genosha as leader of the world's much larger and much faster growing mutant population. Magneto then turned Genosha into the most powerful, technologically advanced country on Earth, which he used as a base to dominate the world and place mutantkind above humanity.

A group of heroes is brought together by Wolverine — who alone remembers the way the world is supposed to be because his 'heart's desire' was to regain all the memories stolen from him by the Weapon X Program — and have their own memories of the "real world" restored by Layla Miller. They band together and attack Magneto in Genosha, believing him to be the one responsible. During the battle Layla is able to restore Magneto's memories, and he confronts his son. Enraged that Quicksilver had done all of this in his name, Magneto kills him. Sensing her brother's death, Wanda resurrects him and retaliates with the phrase "No more mutants", changing the world back to its original form and causing ninety-eight percent of the mutant population to lose their powers, including Magneto. Magneto is left a broken man.

==== Son of M ====
In the 2006 miniseries Son of M, which follows up "House of M", when Quicksilver comes to Genosha to restore the mutants' powers with the Inhumans' Terrigen Mists, Magneto condemns his actions, pointing out the disastrous effects the Mists have on non-Inhumans. Quicksilver attacks Magneto with his new powers from the Mists and savagely beats him until his daughter Luna stops him.

==== The Collective ====
Marvel's editor in chief at that time, Joe Quesada, elaborated on the issue of Xorn and Magneto, stating that "Kuan-Yin Xorn came under the influence of as-yet-to-be-revealed entity that forced him to assume the identity of Magneto." However, the issue of Xorn and Magneto was ultimately resolved during "The Collective" arc in New Avengers. A powerless Magneto is attacked by Xorn, who has somehow evolved into a being of pure energy and merged with both an energy-absorbing mutant named Michael Pointer and free-floating mutant power energy that manifested after Scarlet Witch depowered the bulk of the mutant population. Xorn reveals that he, of his own free will, impersonated Magneto to rally mutantkind against humanity but failed due to the quality of his impersonation. He possesses Magneto and briefly reactivates his powers before being defeated by the New Avengers and a cadre of heroes, including Magneto's former son-in-law Vision and Inhuman S.H.I.E.L.D. agent Daisy Johnson. Iron Man, Ms. Marvel, and Sentry combine their powers and send Xorn into the Sun. Michael Pointer and Magneto are freed as a result, though Magneto is arrested and loaded into a S.H.I.E.L.D. helicopter. The helicopter, however, explodes upon take-off through unknown means as Magneto uses what was left of the energy provided to him by Xorn to escape.

=== Divided We Stand ===
In the 2008 storyline X-Men: Divided We Stand, Magneto appears, apparently at the behest of Exodus and claiming to be powerless, to help restore Professor Xavier's broken psyche. Together they revive Xavier before being attacked by Frenzy. Magneto wounds Frenzy by firing a medical laser into one of her eyes. Seeing the injury of a mutant as a crime, Exodus attacks Magneto. Xavier challenges Exodus on the astral plane. After Xavier defeats Exodus, he leaves Magneto and Omega Sentinel to try and rebuild his lost memories.

=== Manifest Destiny ===
Magneto, his powers artificially simulated by a suit designed by the High Evolutionary, reactivates Sentinels to attack the X-Men, who had recently relocated to San Francisco. Though he is defeated, Magneto's attack serves its purpose as a distraction so the High Evolutionary can gain an unknown object from the Dreaming Celestial. After extensively examining the Dreaming Celestial, the High Evolutionary subjects Magneto to a dangerous technological procedure, restoring his powers.

=== "Nation X" ===
In the "Nation X" storyline, impressed with the X-Men's efforts in defending and helping mutantkind, Magneto offers to work with them on Utopia, the new mutant homeland created by the X-Men using the remnants of Asteroid M. He aids the X-Men in defending Utopia Island from an attack of Predator X monsters. Now considered a member of the X-Men, Magneto assists them in stabilizing the asteroid from sinking into the Pacific. To that end, he works with Namor and the Atlanteans by constructing a pillar supporting Utopia on the surface that would provide a home for the Atlanteans, which Magneto would later refer to as New Atlantis. However, Cyclops reprimands Magneto for acting on his own authority. Despite Xavier being apologetic and appreciative for what he'd done, Magneto leaves Utopia for nearby Mount Tamalpais. In a final bid to gain their trust, Magneto enters a deep meditative catatonic state to focus his powers at an interstellar distance and reverse the path of the Breakworld bullet in which Kitty Pryde is trapped. Magneto had encountered the bullet earlier while working to regain his powers with the High Evolutionary and surmised that Kitty was inside. He had chosen to focus on ways to restore the powers of mutants but memorized the metals of the bullet, allowing him to keep a trace on it. Magneto brings the bullet back to Earth, drawing Kitty out of it and levitating her safely to the ground. However, the strain of using his power at such intensity and duration leaves him comatose.

=== Second Coming ===
In the "Second Coming" storyline, Magneto comes out of his coma right after Hope is teleported into Utopia by a dying Nightcrawler. With the Nimrods laying siege to Utopia, Magneto stops Hank McCoy from leaving his patients as he prepares to enter battle himself. Magneto holds off a squad of Nimrods, dismembering the robots by pulling shards of iron from the core of Utopia through them.

=== The Children's Crusade ===
Magneto learns that the Young Avengers are going to search for the still-missing Scarlet Witch, and that the heroes Wiccan and Speed are the reincarnations of Wanda's children. Magneto meets them, stating that he wants Wiccan and Speed to finally know him as their grandfather, and helps them find Wanda. The Avengers attempt to stop Magneto, before Wiccan teleports Magneto and the Young Avengers to Mount Wundagore. There they encounter Quicksilver, who attempts to kill his father. They discover that this Scarlet Witch is actually a Doombot in disguise.

=== Magneto goes public ===
With his reputation around the world as a well-known mutant revolutionary/terrorist, Magneto is talked into finding a solution to the problem by Cyclops before it goes public that he is established in Utopia. With an earthquake inbound for San Francisco, Magneto uses his powers to stabilize the city's buildings, structures, and metal vehicles and to smooth the earth movements themselves, thus preventing any major damage and saving many lives. As a result, some of the city favors him, while others are reminded of how potentially dangerous he can be and has been.

=== Avengers vs. X-Men and aftermath ===
In the 2012 storyline Avengers vs. X-Men, Magneto fights Iron Man when the X-Men will not give Hope Summers to the Avengers. During the fight, Magneto senses the destructive force of the coming Phoenix. Iron Man stops the fight in favor of helping in the search for Hope. As he is leaving, Magneto tells him to find his daughter Scarlet Witch. After the battles around the world, Magneto and Psylocke meet Storm and an unconscious Doctor Nemesis at one of their hideouts. Magneto, Storm and Psylocke prepare to go to the Moon to help Cyclops. Magneto later informs Cyclops of Namor's assault on Wakanda. Magneto asks Professor X for his help as the Phoenix Force-powered Emma Frost's rule becomes more tyrannical. Magneto later joins the Avengers, the X-Men, and the Hulk in confronting the Phoenix Force-powered Cyclops. Scarlet Witch uses her abilities to keep Magneto from being harmed. Following the defeat of Cyclops, Magneto and the other former members are reported to have gone on the run.

After finding out that his control of his powers has been lost due to contact with the Phoenix Force, Magneto nonetheless teams up with Cyclops, Emma Frost, and Magik to start a new school for mutants since new mutants have started appearing again, in the old Weapon X facility. Magneto also pretended to serve as a disgruntled informer for S.H.I.E.L.D., but it turned out to be an attempt by him to infiltrate the organization.

=== Ongoing Magneto series ===
In 2014, Magneto starred in his first ongoing series, which was written by Cullen Bunn. Feeling disenfranchised by the state of mutant affairs, Magneto decides to venture off on his own to fight for mutantkind's survival on his own terms. The series has been cancelled, with issue #21 being its last issue, which sees Magneto fail to stop the Ultimate Marvel Earth from colliding with the 616 Earth, thus resulting in his death and his daughter Polaris's loss of powers.

=== AXIS ===
During the 2014 AXIS storyline, Magneto enters the island of Genosha to find that it has turned into a concentration camp for mutants. He frees two mutant girls who tell him that Red Skull is responsible and possesses Professor X's brain. Magneto attacks Red Skull, but is quickly stopped by his S-Men. Magneto is captured and mind-tortured by Red Skull. He is given visions of those closest to him suffering while being unable to do anything to stop it. After being freed by the Scarlet Witch, Rogue, and Havok, he bites down on a vial of Mutant Growth Hormone beneath his skin, giving himself enough power to fight. When Havok, Rogue, and Scarlet Witch want to leave the island and alert the rest of the Avengers and X-Men of what Red Skull is doing, Magneto says he is going to stay and fight. Before they can do anything, Red Skull appears. Red Skull now has the group mind-controlled. He plans on using the Scarlet Witch's power to shape reality in his image. He tells Magneto to bow if he wants his daughter to remain alive, but Magneto performs a sneak attack enough to break Red Skull's control over the others. In a fit of rage over finding mutants being used for freak medical experiments, Magneto kills the entire S-Men team. Magneto then attacks Red Skull, all while Red Skull tells Magneto that Professor X's greatest fear was him leading the X-Men. Magneto kills Red Skull while the others look on in horror. Magneto believes everything is over only for Red Skull to reappear as a giant called Red Onslaught.

To combat Red Onslaught, Magneto forms an unnamed group consisting of Absorbing Man, Carnage, Deadpool, Doctor Doom, Enchantress, Hobgoblin, Jack O'Lantern, Mystique, and Sabretooth. After the villains were inverted by the spell cast by Scarlet Witch and Doctor Doom, the group was soon named the Astonishing Avengers.

When Quicksilver and Magneto try to talk the inverted Wanda down, Wanda attacks them with a curse designed to punish her blood relatives, but when only Quicksilver reacts, Wanda realizes that Magneto is not their biological father. After Daniel Drumm's ghost possesses Scarlet Witch and works with Doctor Doom to reverse the inversion spell, Magneto was affected by it and stopped being a threat to mankind.

When Magneto arrives on Genosha and is confronted by S.H.I.E.L.D. agents, Magneto surrenders to them.

=== Secret Wars ===
During the Secret Wars storyline, Magneto had to make a choice during the incursion between Earth-616 and Earth-1610. To save the mutant race, he must attempt to destroy the world colliding with his own. To save the mutant race, he must also protect the humans, who are currently celebrating him as a hero and look on with fascination at what he attempts to do when Earth-1610 throws Sentinels against him. As the energies of Earth-616 and Earth-1610 inched closer to impact cascade and send chaos through the streets, Magneto (aided by his daughter Polaris) are taking the fight to this "other" Earth, battling the parallel Sentinels sent after them. Polaris is shocked to see the energy levels her father is exhibiting, all the while trying to protect the people caught in the crossfire of Magneto and the Sentinels. Magneto clearly has one goal in mind, as he rips a building to pieces to use against the killer robots, not caring much for the collateral damage, or the human lives at risk, as people in the building fall to the ground below. Polaris chides him for so reckless an action as she goes to the rescue while Magneto reminisces about the reason he is currently exhibiting this level of power. Magneto and his current right hand, Briar, work with a chemist under Magneto's employ to pump him up with a new cocktail of various drugs to amplify his powers, but Magneto needs further assistance. Months before the final Incursion happened, Briar established at least initial contact with several scientists which included Doctor Doom, Mister Fantastic, the High Evolutionary, Mister Sinister, Doctor Nemesis, and Dark Beast. However, Magneto instead picked out of the lineup the Sugar Man. From him, Magneto acquires the means to initiate his plan, and thanks him in true Magneto style where he leaves Sugar Man barely alive. In the present time, Magneto continues to use the very magnetic forces of the planet to aid him, yet that is more power than he could ever channel and very quickly begins taking a deadly toll on him. As Polaris tries getting him to take a break because his plan is killing him too quickly, Magneto began thinking that he does not believe in resting even for a minute in his eternal war to protect everything he cares about. He recalls picking up the Sugar Man's power amplifiers and his powers go into hyperdrive and he starts having brain aneurysms. In the present day, Magneto sees S.H.I.E.L.D. coming to his aid and grins. Magneto tells Polaris that her help will not be needed for much longer, and she says she does not understand but quickly figures out what her father meant as Magneto absorbs her power and says that it is his responsibility alone and that he could not let her die alongside him and that she still has something to offer the world. Magneto's powers then go nova as all the powers of the Earth's north and south magnetic poles and all the bioelectric energies of the Earth are channeled through him and he reflects on his life role.

=== All-New, All-Different Marvel ===
As part of the All-New, All-Different Marvel branding, Magneto has been returned to life with no memories of his apparent death. In the wake of the massive anti-mutant uprising, combined with the discovery that the Terrigen Mists that were spread in the atmosphere are harmful to mutants, Magneto has gathered together a team of mutants (consisting of Archangel, M, Psylocke, and Sabretooth) as his own X-Men to defend mutants at any cost.

=== "Civil War II" ===
During the 2016 "Civil War II" storyline, an Inhuman named Ulysses Cain emerges who can "foresee the future". This divides the superhero community, including the X-Men, with one faction led by Carol Danvers believing that the perpetrators of future crimes indicated by Ulysses' visions should be arrested to prevent said crimes, while an opposing faction led by Iron Man believes this would violate individual civil liberties. Magneto and some of the X-Men side with Iron Man, while Storm and the other X-Men side with Danvers. After reaching Ulysses, Magneto asks him why he should not kill or capture him, and Ulysses shows him visions that lead to Magneto leaving Ulysses and New Attilan. It is later shown to be a ploy by Medusa to avoid conflict.

=== Inhumans vs. X-Men ===
Following the 2016 Inhumans vs. X-Men storyline, Magneto is killed by Psylocke per their agreement that she does this if he was to ever regress to his previous megalomaniacal approach to protecting mutantkind. Upon being left for dead in the Savage Land, his body was found by Exodus and healed by Elixir. Following the conclusion of the war between Inhumans and X-Men, with Medusa unleashing the device to destroy the Terrigen Cloud permanently, he was temporarily beaten by a maddened Emma, who lied to the rest of the mutants about the true death of Cyclops to trigger the war. He is later saved by Medusa and about to best Emma for her traitorous act, but Havok prevents him and Medusa from executing Emma for the sake of his late older brother.

=== "Secret Empire" ===
In the 2017 "Secret Empire" storyline, it is revealed that Magneto wants to help the time-displaced original X-Men back to their home timeline. Magneto is approached by Captain America-Steve Rogers, whose memories have been altered by Red Skull's clone using the powers of Kobik to cause Rogers to think that he is a Hydra sleeper agent. Rogers pitched an idea to Magneto that involved a piece of land in the western United States be granted to the mutants that would be their independent nation with the condition being that no inhabitant there would set foot on US soil. When Hydra takes over the United States, Magneto gives in to a deal from Captain America-Rogers, now a Hydra Supreme. As a result, New Tian is formed somewhere in California and Magneto fakes his death so that he can hide out in Madripoor. At the time when Emma Frost meets with Hydra Supreme Rogers the same time the resistances are fighting back Hydra, Magneto flies outside the Hydra Helicarrier and uses giant shards of metal to attack it, at the same time Emma and other mutants finally begins their moves on joining the resistance against Hydra to return the Captain America-Steve Rogers they once knew, who was revealed to be sealed inside by Kobik, and replaced and impersonated by his alternate Hydra Supreme counterpart (now goes the name "Grant Rogers" in the present) as a result of Red Skull's manipulation on her all along.

=== House of X ===
Working with Charles Xavier and Moira X, Magneto helps establish the new sovereign mutant nation on the island of Krakoa. He is first seen at the Jerusalem Habitat, welcoming several ambassadors from several countries as the newly appointed Krakoan ambassador. He guides the group through several Habitats, then reveals that he is aware of their true nature of being potential plants within Krakoa. Although he claims that he is not threatening them, he tells them that they "have new gods now."

=== Judgment Day ===
During the "Judgment Day" storyline, Arakko is attacked by Uranos, with Magneto being killed. Magneto is resurrected, but his body deteriorates, apparently as an effect of his resurrection. Following the end of the Krakoan Age, Magneto begins working with Cyclops's X-Men team in Alaska. Magneto's condition is later revealed to be unrelated to his resurrection, having originated from the future.

== Powers and abilities ==
Magneto is a powerful mutant with the ability to manipulate magnetic fields to achieve a wide range of effects. He is classified as an Omega-level mutant.

The primary application of his power is control over magnetism and the manipulation of both ferrous and indirectly nonferrous metal via metal ores they may contain. Magneto is also capable of creating powerful electromagnetic fields capable of moving and manipulating non-metallic objects, as well as levitating them (he can also do this via force fields). He can even perceive tachyons and a variety of antiparticles. While the maximum amount of mass he can manipulate at one time is unknown, he has moved large asteroids several times and effortlessly levitated a 30,000 ton nuclear submarine filled with sea water from the depths of the ocean. His powers extend into the atomic level (insofar as the electromagnetic force is responsible for chemical bonding), allowing him to manipulate chemical structures and rearrange matter, although this is often a strenuous task. He can manipulate a large number of individual objects simultaneously and has assembled complex machinery with his powers. He can also affect non-metallic and non-magnetic objects to a lesser extent. He can also generate electromagnetic pulses of great strength and generate and manipulate electromagnetic energy down to photons. He even uses the electromagnetic energy that surrounds earth to fly. He can turn invisible by warping visible light around his body. Another way in which Magneto frequently uses his power is the projection of force-fields which selectively block out matter and energy. These fields are strong enough to withstand the simultaneous detonation of multiple thermonuclear weapons, hence Magneto is invulnerable to most harm when surrounded by his shield and can survive in deep space thanks to it. He can also channel his powers through his own body to increase his strength and durability far beyond human limits and has a baseline reaction time 15 times faster than those of regular humans. On occasion he has altered the behavior of gravitational fields around him, which has been suggested as evidence of the existence of a unified field which he can manipulate. He has demonstrated the capacity to produce a wormhole and to safely teleport himself and others via the wormhole.

Magneto has been frequently depicted as able to resist all but the strongest or most unexpected of telepathic attacks. A number of explanations have been proposed for his unusually strong resistance to telepathy, among them: (a) technology wired into his helmet (the explanation given in several comic plotlines), (b) some physical aspect of his electromagnetic powers that can interfere with telepathy (he once used the Earth's magnetic field to dampen the powers of all telepaths within his reach), (c) latent telepathic powers of his own or (d) sheer force of will (cf. X-Men #2). The most commonly used iteration of Magneto's resistance to telepathy is his helmet which he had specially built to prevent Charles Xavier or any other high level telepath of reading, influencing or controlling his thoughts. The theme of latent telepathic powers has been explored in a number of stories, among them the Secret Wars limited series. In some of his earliest appearances, Magneto was depicted as capable of engaging in astral projection. He has used Cerebro to locate mutants at great distances while leading the New Mutants. He has also, on rare occasions, been shown reading others' dreams, issuing telepathic commands, and probing the minds of others. He has demonstrated the ability to shield his mind, while in intense meditation, so completely that even Emma Frost was not able to read his thoughts, despite being directly in front of him and actively attempting to do so.

In addition to his powers, Magneto has many other skills. He is a genius with competence in various fields of advanced science, especially in genetic manipulation, particle physics, engineering, and other fields of technology. He has built advanced weaponry, space stations, superpowered humanoid lifeforms, and devices that generate volcanoes and earthquakes, block telepathy, and nullify all mutant powers across a few miles except for his own. He has promptly reconstructed such computerized devices from memory. He has bio-engineered new species including the Savage Land Mutates, and, using Deviant technology, Alpha the Ultimate Mutant. He is fluent in many human languages and once single-handedly deciphered the unknown language of a lost civilization. He possesses extraordinary skill in "reading" the microexpressions on others' faces and sensing what they are thinking and feeling, whether they are lying, fearful, etc. a skill which he refers to as "taking your enemy's measure". He also is a master strategist and tactician with extensive combat experience, and has often been successful in single-handed combat against entire groups of superhuman adversaries. He also has some military training in hand-to-hand combat and has been shown to be effective with his fists, but he prefers to use his powers when in combat situations.

=== Equipment ===
Magneto's helmet can shield his mind from psychic attacks. His armor is made of durable, but lightweight alloys that protect him from physical injuries. When combined with other metals, Magneto can make his armor stronger than Iron Man's armors.

== Other versions ==
=== 1602 ===
In the alternative history of 1602, Magneto is known as Enrique, or the Grand Inquisitor, his true agenda a mystery. Born a Jew in the Venice Ghetto, he was taken in by a Christian priest and baptized. The Christians later refused to let him return to his Jewish family, saying that giving him back to the 'Christ-killers' would damn his soul to Hell. Being unable to reunite with his family left Enrique psychologically scarred. As an adult, Enrique became the leader of the Spanish Inquisition.

=== Age of Apocalypse ===
In the reality of the Age of Apocalypse, Magneto founded the X-Men after the death of Charles Xavier. He and the X-Men fight against the forces of this world's Apocalypse who, having been wakened early by the battle between David and Magneto, was able to take over North America in the absence of Xavier. In this timeline, Magneto is married to his former protégé Rogue, with his powers protecting him from Rogue's draining touch. Magneto and Rogue have a son named Charles, in honor of Xavier.

=== Amalgam ===
In the Amalgam Comics universe, Erik Magnus is a heroic defender of Metamutants, leading his Brotherhood to save and protect them. After Sentinels created by Magneto's villainous brother Will kill the Brotherhood, Erik uses Will's technology to create a team of "Magnetic Men", each formed from a different metal, and imbued with the personalities of his fallen comrades.

=== Days of Future Past ===
In the alternate future of "Days of Future Past", Magneto and the X-Men are held in a mutant concentration camp, with their powers suppressed by inhibitor collars. It is implied but never stated that he devised the X-Men's plan to escape from the camp and send Kate Pryde's spirit back through time. The X-Men, with the help of Franklin Richards, disable the inhibitors and manage to escape the camp. Magneto stays behind to cover their escape and is presumably killed by the Sentinels.

=== Earth X ===
In "Earth X", Magneto resides in Sentinel City along with Toad. After the Celestial is removed from Earth, the resulting shifts due to the removal of the vibranium within the Earth shifts the magnetic poles, transferring Magneto's powers to Toad. When the vibranium is restored, Magneto's powers are restored as well.

=== Exiles/Magnus ===
In the Exiles comics, an alternative good version of Magneto living on Earth-27 falls in love with Rogue. Magneto uses his powers to alter Rogue's DNA so they can touch and kiss. Rogue and Magneto have a son whom they name Magnus, who inherited Magneto's magnetic powers. As a teenager, Magnus develops a secondary mutation akin to Rogue's draining powers which cause anyone he touches to transform into immobile steel. Magnus is eventually forced to join the Exiles, a group of alternative reality mutants forced to repair broken realities.

=== Marvel Zombies ===
In the reality of Marvel Zombies, Magneto and his Acolytes were a few of the survivors following a plague that caused an undead-like effect in "super-powered beings". Marvel Zombies: Dead Days reveals that Magneto made a deal with an unknown entity from another universe to damage the Earth to let mutants become the dominant force. Initially residing in Asteroid M for his own safety, Magneto returns to Earth to assist the survivors. Magneto is later converted into a zombie during a battle with the zombie forces, with the zombie horde killing him shortly afterward.

=== Mutant X ===
In the Mutant X universe, Magneto is the leader of the X-Men. Several of the X-Men, however, feel that he has strayed from Professor X's dream and split off to form a separate mutant team, the Six.

=== Old Man Logan ===
In the universe of "Old Man Logan", Magneto is among the villains who united to take down each of the superheroes. Magneto gains control of the Western United States and rules it for a time until he is killed by Kingpin.

=== Powerless ===
In Powerless (which takes place in a world without superpowers), Magneto appears as a middle-aged American senator named Eric Magnus. He is involved with a shadowy government conspiracy involving mentally conditioned assassins, and is ultimately killed by Logan after arranging the death of Charles Xavier.

=== Ruins ===
Ruins is a dystopian series where the circumstances that gave the normal Marvel Universe's heroes their powers instead led to more realistic effects causing horrific deformities and deaths. The version of Magneto seen in Ruins is shown as a demonstrator protesting against President Charles Xavier. His powers are uncontrollable, causing him to wear a magnetic-dampening harness around his chest. When a government agent pushes him aside and breaks the device, Magneto loses control of his powers, killing himself and a group of civilians.

=== Ultimate Marvel ===
In the Ultimate Marvel comics, Magneto is the son of Weapon X agents, and that he was responsible for their deaths. An arrogant fantasist who gradually sank deeper and deeper into his self-proclaimed role as Mutant Messiah, Erik Lehnsherr eventually reinvented himself as Magneto, the leader of the Brotherhood of Mutants and a ruthless terrorist who is willing to kill hundreds in the name of mutant supremacy.

=== What If? ===
There were various What If issues that had Magneto as a key character, several prove that when the Master of Magnetism completely surrenders to his darkest impulses, he becomes one of the most terrifying forces in existence.

- What if? ... "What if Magneto took over the U.S.A.?" - Following the death of Professor X, Cyclops, and Jean Grey at the hand of Cable, Magneto becomes dictator of the United States. When Magneto takes over the White House, a group of Sentinels are sent to stop him. Magneto destroys a Sentinel that was carrying a nuclear warhead, causing an explosion that kills him and most of the X-Men.
- What if? ... "What if Legion killed Magneto?" - Magneto is the focus of this issue, through his mere absence is a departure from the Legion Quest and Age of Apocalypse storylines.
- What if? ... "What if the Age of Apocalypse had not ended?" - Prominently features Magneto continuing his role as leader of the X-Men, continuing after the events shown in Age of Apocalypse.
- What if? ... "What if Magneto ruled all mutants?" - Magneto leads the remains of mutantkind, as they float through space on Asteroid M. He manipulates his followers into believing a baby born among them is the next stage in human evolution beyond mutants, leading to the death of the baby. Realizing that the baby was actually just normal and Magneto did this to keep his followers together, Colossus leaves in disgust.
- What if? ... "What if Professor X and Magneto formed the X-Men together?" - In an alternative reality, Magneto and Xavier's confrontation with Baron Strucker did not end with Magneto leaving with Strucker's gold. Instead, he was convinced by Gabrielle Haller to let go of his hatred. Together, Magnus and Xavier formed the X-Men and were responsible for advancing the mutant cause and aiding world peace.

=== X-Men: Fairy Tales ===
Two versions of Magneto appear in X-Men Fairy Tales:

- The first version is an eagle who witnessed his family's slaughter when he was young, and had to teach himself to fly and survive. He has many 'demons' of his past that continue to haunt him, although while he is with his friend, a tortoise (based on Professor X), they fade. When they come back to haunt him, he no longer believes in the friendship, thinking himself a danger to those around him.
- The second version appears as an antagonist to Cyclops, in a story based on the tale of Momotarō.

=== X-Men: Noir ===
In Marvel Noir, Eric Magnus is a Chief of Detectives in the New York City Homicide Department, a firm believer in eugenics, and leader of the secret society that rules over most organized crime in the city, the Brotherhood.

== Reception ==
=== Critical reception ===
David Harth of CBR.com called Magneto the "X-Men's most iconic villain", writing: "Tragedy molded Magneto into one of the most well-developed Marvel villains of all time. He's also one of the most popular, which is why he's reformed multiple times in the past. Few villains have had the same effect on the Marvel Universe as Magneto, and he's changed the way fans perceive antagonists." IGN asserted: "Magneto has become bigger than his peers and virtually all of his enemies. It's the sign of a great character when his presence dominates a story and his absence creates a vacuum that cannot be filled by any other. Through his legendary role in Marvel Comics over the years as well as fantastic portrayals in film and animation, it's hard to argue that there has ever been a villain more complex, nuanced, sympathetic and yet irrevocably evil."

=== Accolades ===
- In 2006, Wizard Magazine ranked Magneto 17th in their "Top 100 Greatest Villains Ever" list.
- In 2008, Wizard Magazine ranked Magneto 9th in their "Top 200 Comics Characters Of All Time" list.
- In 2014, IGN ranked Magneto 1st in their "Top 100 Comic Book Villains" list.
- In 2014, Entertainment Weekly ranked Magneto 20th in their "Let's rank every X-Man ever" list.
- In 2019, IGN ranked Magneto 2nd in their "Top 25 Marvel Villains" list.
- In 2019, CBR.com ranked Magneto 3rd in their "X-Men: The 5 Deadliest Members Of The Hellfire Club (& The 5 Weakest)" list.
- In 2020, Screen Rant included Magneto in their "Marvel: 25 Most Powerful Mutants" list.
- In 2022, Digital Trends ranked Magneto 8th in their "Marvel's most powerful mutants" list.
- In 2022, The Mary Sue ranked Magneto 4th in their "8 Most Powerful Marvel Mutants" list.
- In 2022, CBR.com ranked Magneto 11th in their "13 Most Important Marvel Villains" list.
- In 2022, Newsarama ranked Magneto 5th in their "Best Marvel supervillains" list.
- In 2023, CBR.com ranked Magneto 9th in their "10 Most Popular Marvel Characters" list.

=== Literary reception ===
==== Magneto - 2014 ====
According to Diamond Comic Distributors, Magneto #1 was the 19th best selling comic book in March 2014.

Eric Diaz of Nerdist called Magneto #1 "tight, disturbing and even managed to be funny at times," asserting, "Of all the classic super villains in the Marvel and DC universes, Magneto is the easiest sell as an ongoing series, simply because on some level we all sympathize with him. You couldn't really do a Dr. Doom series, or a Joker series (both have been tried, both didn't really work), and have it connect with an audience in the same way, but Magneto is an entirely different animal. So far, Marvel seems to be off a great start with this one, and this is definitely a book worth checking out." Mat Elfring of ComicVine gave Magneto #1 a grade of 5 out of 5 stars, saying, " The majority of the time, when a member of the X-Men gets their own solo book, it lacks purpose and direction. It feels like a cash grab, waiting to fizzle out into cancellation. Magneto is a book with a purpose and it feels right. This first issue really sticks with the reader because of the tone and it blew me away. This book has a very talented writing and art team behind it. This first issue really grabs you, and while there are a few small problems, like what's going on with Magneto's powers and it being tough to swallow that Magneto is a bit of a Punisher archetype, the overall book is still fantastic."

==== X-Men Black: Magneto - 2018 ====
According to Diamond Comic Distributors, X-Men Black: Magneto #1 was the 31st best selling comic book in October 2018.

Jamie Lovett of ComicBook.com gave X-Men Black: Magneto #1 a grade of 3 out of 5, writing, "Chris Claremont has a talent for filling in every corner of a character's personality, and that talent is on display in X-Men Black: Magneto, where we learn about Magneto's appreciation for speculative fiction, but his actual characterization of Magneto feels all over the place. The current metaplot of the X-Men line has sent Magneto on a fresh villain turn which Claremont seems forced to adhere to. But he seems to be resisting it as well, piling on justifications for every thought and action Magneto takes, painting a picture of Magneto that feels both incomplete and contradictory. The story also has at least one child who talks like a post-graduate thesis too many. Lonnie Nadler and Zac Thompson's backup story centering on Apocalypse is more interesting. As the opening chapter in a story that will continue throughout X-Men Black, it's just enough to whet your appetite, but Nadler and Thompson's take on classic archvillain Apocalypse, Geraldo Borges' artwork, and the hook that reveals itself at the twist at the chapter's end will have readers intrigued." Matt Lune of CBR.com said, "X-Men Black: Magneto #1 gives us two stories, and each have their merits. In the main story, Claremont and Talajic provide an interesting character focus that, while not necessarily breaking any new ground, reinforces Magneto's situation and pushes him forward with a new objective and a potential new character or two. Meanwhile, Thompson, Nadler and Borges' Apocalypse backup puts the villain back on the table in a fresh way that will be interesting to watch moving forward. We may be in a brief limbo with regards to the X-Men line, but X-Men Black has started in a strong way that shouldn't be readily dismissed."

Magneto was ranked by IGN as the Greatest Comic Book Villain of All Time.

In 2019, CBR.com ranked Magneto 3rd in their "X-Men: The 5 Deadliest Members Of The Hellfire Club (& The 5 Weakest)" list.

David Harth of CBR.com called Magneto the "X-Men's most iconic villain," writing, "Tragedy molded Magneto into one of the most well-developed Marvel villains of all time. He's also one of the most popular, which is why he's reformed multiple times in the past. Few villains have had the same effect on the Marvel Universe as Magneto, and he's changed the way fans perceive antagonists." IGN asserted, "Magneto has become bigger than his peers and virtually all of his enemies. It's the sign of a great character when his presence dominates a story and his absence creates a vacuum that cannot be filled by any other. Through his legendary role in Marvel Comics over the years as well as fantastic portrayals in film and animation, it's hard to argue that there has ever been a villain more complex, nuanced, sympathetic and yet irrevocably evil."

- In 2019, CBR.com ranked Magneto 3rd in their "X-Men: The 5 Deadliest Members Of The Hellfire Club (& The 5 Weakest)" list.

== In other media ==
=== Television ===
Magneto has been adapted into several animated television series. The character first appearance was an altered, non-mutant version called Dr. Magneto in the 1967 Spider-Man cartoon, in the episode "The Revenge of Dr Magneto", voiced by Bernard Cowan. The first appearance of the comic version came later, in the 1978 Fantastic Four episode "The Menace of Magneto", voiced by John Stephenson. Throughout the 1980s, the character appeared in the Spider-Man (1981–1983) episode "When Magneto Speaks… People Listen", voiced by Walker Edmiston, and later in Spider-Man and His Amazing Friends (1981–1983), voiced by Michael Rye. He was also featured in the pilot X-Men: Pryde of the X-Men (1989), voiced by Earl Boen.

Magneto as depicted in X-Men: The Animated Series.

Throughout the 1990s, Magneto was featured prominently as an enemy of the X-Men in X-Men: The Animated Series (1992–1997), voiced by David Hemblen. The character later returned in the revival X-Men '97 (2024–present), voiced by Matthew Waterson. Throughout the 2000s and 2010s, Magneto appeared in X-Men: Evolution (2000–2003), voiced by Christopher Judge, in Wolverine and the X-Men (2009), voiced by Tom Kane, in The Super Hero Squad Show (2009–2011), voiced by Maurice LaMarche, and in Iron Man: Armored Adventures (2009–2012), voiced by Ron Halder. This version was an amalgamation of the film version and the Ultimate Universe version of the character. The character later appeared in the Marvel Disk Wars: The Avengers (2014) episode "X-Men! To Loki's Castle!", voiced by Banjō Ginga in the Japanese version and Neil Kaplan in the English version, and in Lego Marvel Avengers: Strange Tails (2025), voiced by Jason Alexander.

=== Films ===
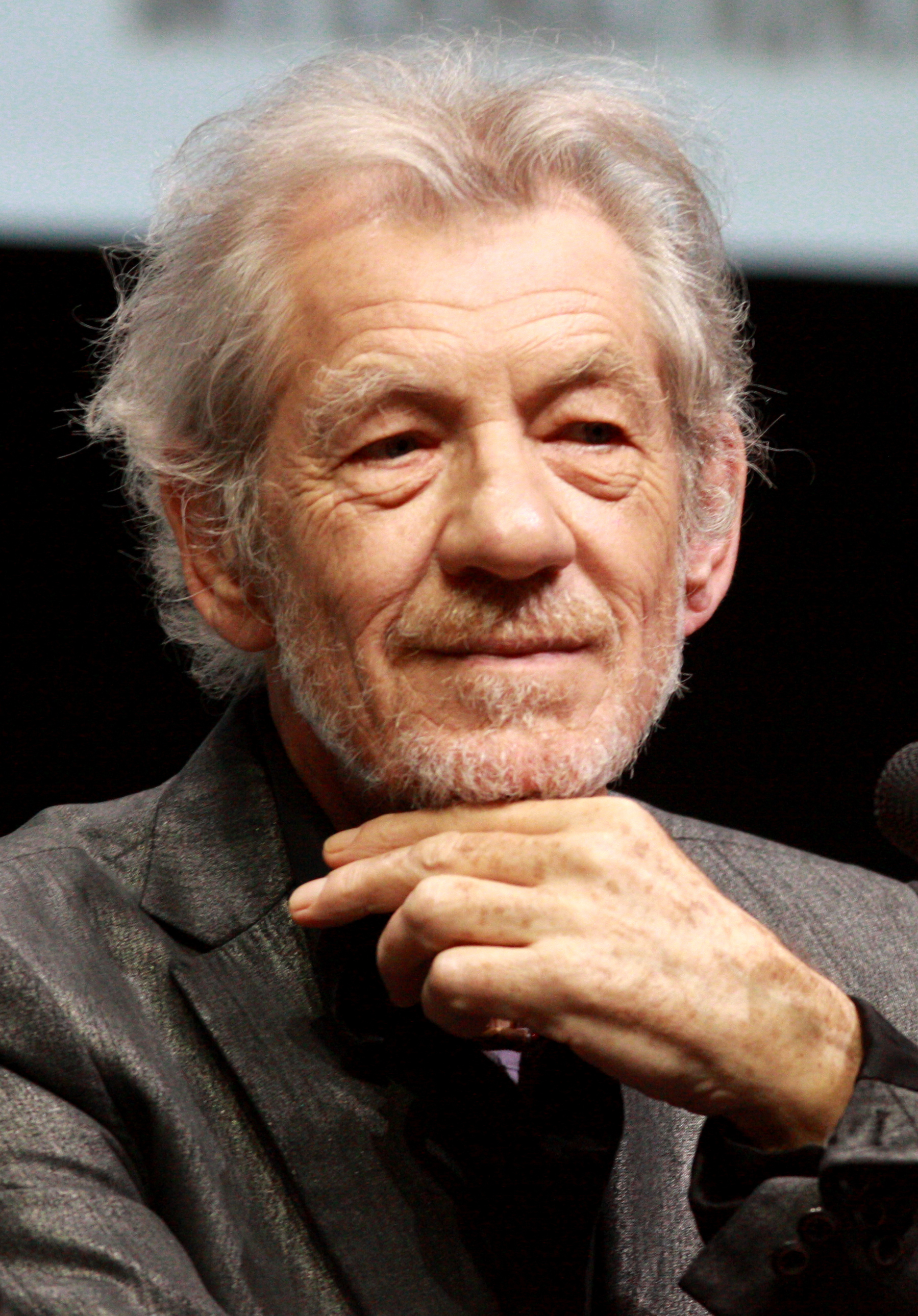
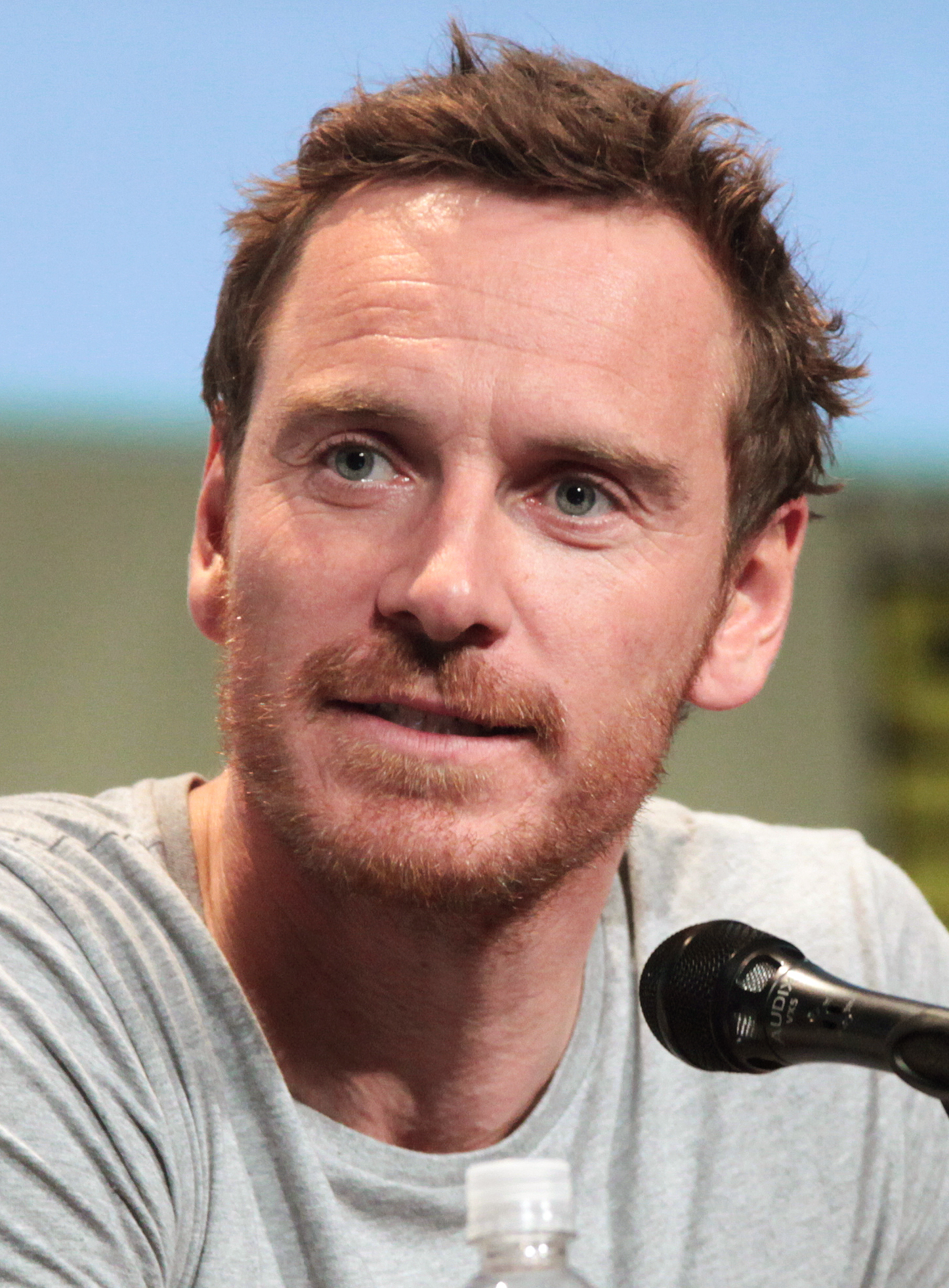
Ian McKellen (left, pictured in 2013) portrays an older version of Magneto in the X-Men original trilogy (2000–2006) and returns in the MCU film Avengers: Doomsday (2026). Michael Fassbender (right, pictured in 2015) plays the younger version of the character in the X-Men prequel films (2011–2019).

Two incarnations of Magneto appeared in 20th Century Fox’s X-Men film series (2000–2024). The first incarnation was an older version of the character, who first appeared in the X-Men original trilogy (2000–2006), portrayed by Ian McKellen in X-Men (2000). This was followed by four additional appearances by McKellen’s Magneto: X2: X-Men United (2003), X-Men: The Last Stand (2006), a brief cameo in the mid-credits scene of The Wolverine (2013), and a final appearance in X-Men: Days of Future Past (2014). McKellen is set to reprise the role in the Marvel Cinematic Universe (MCU) film Avengers: Doomsday (2026).

The second incarnation was a younger version of the character, who first appeared in the X-Men prequel films (2011–2019), which rebooted the film series, with Michael Fassbender portraying a younger version of McKellen’s Magneto. This version briefly joined the X-Men in X-Men: First Class (2011) before becoming the antagonist in X-Men: Days of Future Past (2014), which also featured McKellen in scenes set in the future. Fassbender reprised the role in X-Men: Apocalypse (2016) and in X-Men: Dark Phoenix (2019), the final installment of the prequel films, which adapted "The Dark Phoenix Saga".

During the production of X2: X-Men United (2003), Fox originally planned a film centered on Magneto, with David S. Goyer and Sheldon Turner developing an origin story that was described as "The Pianist meets X-Men". Ultimately, the project was canceled after X-Men Origins: Wolverine (2009) was poorly received, and Fox incorporated elements of Turner’s script into the development of X-Men: First Class (2011).

=== Video games ===
Magneto has appeared in numerous video games over the decades, most often as an antagonist but frequently as a playable character due to his popularity. One of his earliest and "most memorable appearances" was as the final boss in Konami's 1992 X-Men arcade game, where he kidnaps Professor X and Kitty Pryde, forcing the X-Men to battle their way through a series of levels to confront him. Magneto later became a staple of Marvel's fighting games. After first appearing as a playable character in Marvel Super Heroes, he went on to become one of the "strongest fighters that players can choose from" in the Marvel vs. Capcom series, particularly in Ultimate Marvel vs. Capcom 3. He later appeared as a wearable cosmetic in Fortnite (2017), and as a playable character in Marvel Rivals (2024). He also appears in Marvel Tōkon: Fighting Souls (2026) as a member of the Doom Knights.

A more humorous take on the character appeared in Lego Marvel Super Heroes (2013), where Magneto initially serves as one of the game's villains. After destroying the X-Mansion and animating the Statue of Liberty to fight the heroes, he eventually joins them to battle Galactus. Outside his role in the story, Magneto is an unlockable playable character, and the game includes numerous puzzles designed for his magnetic abilities.

Magneto has also appeared in numerous video games featuring voice credits, including X-Men: Children of the Atom (1994), voiced by George Buza; and Marvel Super Heroes (1995), X-Men vs. Street Fighter (1996), and Marvel vs. Capcom 2: New Age of Heroes (2000), voiced by Lorne Kennedy. The character also appeared in X-Men: Next Dimension (2002) and X2: Wolverine’s Revenge (2003), both voiced by Fred Tatasciore, in X-Men Legends (2004), voiced by Tony Jay, and in Marvel Nemesis: Rise of the Imperfects (2005), voiced by Christopher Gaze. In X-Men Legends II: Rise of Apocalypse (2005) and Marvel: Ultimate Alliance (2006, Xbox 360 version), he was voiced by H. Richard Greene.

In X-Men: The Official Game (2006), he was voiced by Dwight Schultz, while in Marvel Super Hero Squad (2009), Marvel Super Hero Squad: The Infinity Gauntlet (2010), Marvel vs. Capcom 3: Fate of Two Worlds (2011), Ultimate Marvel vs. Capcom 3 (2011), Marvel Super Hero Squad Online (2011), Marvel Powers United VR (2018), and Marvel Ultimate Alliance 3: The Black Order (2019) he was voiced by Tom Kane. In X-Men: Destiny (2011), he was voiced by Bill Graves, while in Marvel Avengers: Battle for Earth (2012), Marvel Heroes (2013), Marvel Rivals (2024), and Marvel Tōkon: Fighting Souls (2026) he was voiced by James Arnold Taylor. In Lego Marvel Super Heroes (2013), he was voiced by Nolan North.

== See also ==
- Magneto and Titanium Man
