= Pip the Troll =

Fictional character from Marvel Comics

- Pip the Troll as depicted in Official Handbook of the Marvel Universe A-Z Update #2 (August 2010). Art by Jim Starlin.

Publication information
- Publisher: Marvel Comics
- First appearance: Strange Tales #179 (February 1975)
- Created by: Jim Starlin

In-story information
- Alter ego: Pip Gofern
- Species: Laxidazian
- Team affiliations: Infinity Watch; X-Factor Investigations
- Partnerships: Adam Warlock; Thanos
- Notable aliases: Ralph Bunker
- Abilities: Teleportation

Pip the Troll is a fictional character appearing in American comic books published by Marvel Comics.

He made his live-action debut in the Marvel Cinematic Universe film Eternals (2021), voiced by Patton Oswalt.

== Publication history ==
Pip the Troll was introduced by Jim Starlin in Strange Tales vol. 2 #179 (February 1975) to be a comic foil to the story's protagonist, Adam Warlock. Pip returned in Strange Tales vol. 2 #180-181 (March–April 1975) and Warlock vol. 1 #9-12 (October 1975-Jan 1976) before his death in Avengers Annual #7 (March 1977).

Starlin revived the character years later in Silver Surfer vol. 3 #46 (December 1990). Pip played a role in the 1991 Infinity Gauntlet crossover before joining the titular team of Warlock and the Infinity Watch in issue two (March 1992). He appeared in the title until its cancellation in 1995 with issue 42. During its run, the character was also featured in the Infinity War, Infinity Crusade, and Blood and Thunder crossovers.

After a brief appearance in a back-up feature in Cosmic Powers Unlimited #4 (1996), the character was not seen again until 2002 when Starlin used him in Infinity Abyss #1-6. He returned in Marvel: The End #5-6 (2003) and Thanos #3-4 (2004), She-Hulk #12-13 (2005), and X-Factor #207-213 (2010–2011).

== Fictional character biography ==
Pip is originally known as Prince Gofern of the planet Laxidazia, in the Dolenz System, in the Milky Way galaxy. He is originally an alien of the Laxidazian race who was mutated into a satyr-like form known as a "troll" after drinking mutagenic ale. Like all Laxidazian trolls, Pip has four digits (including opposable thumb) on each hand, hooflike feet, and large pointed ears; apparently, normal Laxidazians are nearly identical to humans. After his transformation, his people, also sick of his lewd, lecherous, and hedonistic behavior, strip him of his office and rank. He stows away on a spaceship and continues his life of debauchery. Pip begins wearing ripped maroon pants and nothing else.

Missionaries from the Universal Church of Truth visit Pip's home planet and discover the trolls are resistant to the church's conversion process. As a result, all trolls are ordered to be killed. Pip himself is caught after making trouble on dozens of planets, many controlled by the church. He ends up on a ship full of men and women who are to be executed. There he meets Adam Warlock, whose alternate future self the Magus will become the leader of the Church of Truth. Pip teams up with Warlock to escape and go on adventures. Pip then meets Gamora. Pip meets Thanos, and alongside Warlock, Gamora, and Thanos, he battles the Magus and the Universal Church. He encounters Starfox and Heater Delight, and battles Pro-Boscis the Procurer. Eventually the threat of the Magus is neutralized and Pip parts company with Adam on the world of Sirus X.

After getting into much more trouble, Pip decides to look for Adam again. Pip explores one of Thanos' old hideouts and discovers not Adam, but Thanos himself. Thanos destroys Pip's mind, but Adam manages to absorb Pip's soul into the Soul Gem (killing his mindless body, but restoring mental function to his soul), reuniting him with the spirits of Gamora and eventually Adam Warlock in Soulworld within the Soul Gem.

Pip resides in Soulworld for some time. While there, he accompanies the Silver Surfer and Captain Autolycus in search of Warlock. He witnesses a battle between Warlock and Drax the Destroyer.

=== Infinity Watch ===
Pip, Gamora, and Warlock return to the corporeal world during the Infinity Gauntlet incident by taking over bodies of three crash victims. Pip, in possession of the body of Ralph Bunker, and Gamora are both shown to have significantly increased physical strength in their new bodies. However, soon after returning to life, Gamora disappears. Alongside Warlock, Pip confers with Doctor Strange, Rintrah, Doctor Doom, and the Silver Surfer regarding Thanos and the Infinity Gauntlet. Alongside Doctor Strange, Clea, and Rintrah, Pip battles Silver Dagger. Alongside Rintrah, Pip time-travels to Earth's Jurassic era to rescue Firelord and Drax the Destroyer. Alongside Warlock and Gamora, Pip visits Thanos after his defeat. With Gamora, Pip summons Doctor Strange to deal with the seemingly power-mad Warlock, but is reconciled with Warlock.

Afterwards, Pip is given the Space Gem by Warlock, keeping it between his toes for safekeeping. Pip joins Warlock's Infinity Watch. With the Infinity Watch, Pip is captured by the Man-Beast, but rescued by Warlock. Pip and his friends end up setting shop on Monster Island. Pip takes too much as usual and abuses the hospitality of Mole Man. In a dispute over the sovereignty of the island, forces of the United Nations invade. Pip and the others hang back as Gamora cleans house, killing no one. The group makes bets on the fight.

Around this time, the Infinity War happens. When Warlock has control of the Infinity Gauntlet, he forces out the good and evil sides of himself. The evil side returns as the Magus. Pip is drawn into the fight when Thanos recruits the Watch. As most of Earth's heroes do not trust Thanos, Pip and his friends are forced to battle them as well. Eventually both sides work together to take down the Magus.

=== Infinity Crusade ===
Pip becomes involved in the Infinity Crusade. He manages to be a capable 'leader' of the remnants of the Infinity Watch when various events take most of them away. Moondragon, for example, is brainwashed and taken by the Goddess, the 'good' side of Adam Warlock. She is using a Cosmic Egg, the merging of several Cosmic Cubes, to implement her plans, which involve brainwashing dozens of superheroes. Left on Monster Island with Maxam and Drax the Destroyer, the three argue over who should lead. Pip decides to go outside the group for help and kidnaps Mister Fantastic. The leader of the Fantastic Four soon realizes what is going on and pitches in to help. This, and the kidnapping of other superheroes, brings everyone together, Pip included, at Avengers Mansion and actually spurs on the heroic efforts of the rest of the super-powered community. Pip is spurred to create a new, 'super-heroic' costume, but fails to wash himself while changing. His body odor is so offensive the Hulk forcibly bathes him.

=== After Infinity Watch ===
Professor X proceeds to make telepathic contact with one of the Goddess' thralls, Pip's former ally, Moondragon. Pip secretly touches Xavier and his powers make contact through the link, allowing him to know the location of the Goddess because Moondragon knows it.

Pip teleports to it, in the center of the Goddess' planet, a new form of Counter-Earth. By touching the Cosmic Egg, Pip gains access to its near-infinite powers. He turns the Goddess into salt. He manifests a throne and sits upon it, musing as to what to do with his newfound powers. He reflects on many plans for Earth, such as making super-powered beings wash his car and changing all the females, including the overweight and elderly, into shapely, twenty-something women. One of his goals is to gain revenge on the Hulk for forcibly bathing him; however, he realizes none of this will make him truly happy, and therefore decides on something that will: a simple birthday party thrown for him by his friends. Before he can implement this, he is subdued by the brainwashed guardian of the Egg, the female New Warriors member Silhouette. She had been hiding in a nearby container, for just this sort of situation.

Pip also appears in Marvel: The End #5–6 and She-Hulk (2005 series) #12–13. Pip assists Thanos in his first quest after his experience in Marvel: The End in Thanos #1–6.

=== X-Factor Investigations ===
Pip is next seen when Hela, the Norse goddess of death, appears in disguise and hires X-Factor Investigations to find a missing pendant of Thor's hammer. When Jamie Madrox and Banshee track it down and take it off of the neck of a drunken bar patron, he reverts to Pip the Troll. Without the pendant hiding him, Hela is able to track down Pip, whom she captures. This angers Madrox, who feels responsible, and the team travels to Las Vegas and saves the troll with the help of Thor. Pip follows X-Factor back to New York and joins the team, serving as receptionist, out of gratitude for their actions; however, a mysterious phone call Pip receives reveals that Pip has other, as-yet-unknown reasons for joining the group.

A woman Pip previously helped later shoots him in the head after claiming that "X-Factor will fall". The injury, however, is not fatal due to his non-human physique: Laxidazians' brains are in their chest, next to the heart. While recovering from the gunshot, Pip's mind borrows the body of Monet St. Croix.

== Powers and abilities ==
When in possession of the Space Gem, Pip could theoretically access virtually incalculable powers, but chose to use it merely for transportation and teleportation. The gem gave him the ability to teleport to places he knows of. This he often used for his own ends, stealing the Fantasticar and other objects. When forced into battle, he tends to appear directly above his adversary's head, intending to deliver a powerful blow. He has since lost the Space Gem, but his long-term exposure to it has given him the innate ability to teleport.

== In other media ==
=== Television ===
Pip the Troll appears in Silver Surfer, voiced by Robert Bockstael. This version was created by the Kree to act as slave labor, but escaped with the Silver Surfer's help. Afterwards, he accompanies him on his quest to return to his home planet of Zenn-La.

=== Film ===
- Pip makes a non-speaking cameo appearance in Planet Hulk.
- Pip appears in the mid-credits scene of Eternals, voiced by Patton Oswalt.

=== Video games ===
- Pip appears in Marvel's Guardians of the Galaxy.
