= X-Factor (comics) =

Comic book superhero team

- The 1990s X-Factor team. Art by Joe Quesada.

Publication information
- Publisher: Marvel Comics
- First appearance: (1980s team); X-Factor #1 (Feb. 1986) (1990s team); X-Factor #71 (Oct. 1991)
- Created by: 1980s team: Bob Layton; Jackson Guice; 1990s team: Peter David; Larry Stroman

In-story information
- Type of organization: Team
- Base(s): 1980s team: Ship; 1990s team: The Pentagon, Washington, D.C., Fall's Edge, Virginia

X-Factor is a group of mutant superheroes appearing in American comic books published by Marvel Comics.

== Publication history ==
=== Original team (1986–1991) ===
X-Factor launched in 1986 featuring a team composed of the five original X-Men that debuted in X-Men #1 (1963):

- Angel – A millionaire heir, capable of flight by means of two feathery wings extending from his back.
- Beast – A brilliant scientist possessing bestial strength and agility.
- Cyclops – Former X-Men team leader, with the ability to emit powerful "optic blasts" from his eyes.
- Marvel Girl – The long-time love of Cyclops, possessing telekinetic abilities.
- Iceman – A brash jokester gifted with cryokinesis, the ability to lower temperature around him to form ice.

In the 1970s and early 1980s, Angel, Beast, and Iceman wandered through various superhero teams. By 1985, all three were members of the Defenders. With the monthly Defenders series already due to be cancelled, Angel, Beast, and Iceman were freed up for X-Factor.

A more difficult task was the return of Cyclops and Jean Grey. In 1980, Jean Grey was killed during the seminal Dark Phoenix Saga, and it was considered vital that the new team have a female member. In one of the most significant cases of retroactive continuity in comic book history, it was revealed that Jean Grey had never actually been the Phoenix. Instead, the Phoenix entity copied Grey's identity and form, keeping her safe in a cocoon-like structure beneath Jamaica Bay.

In order to join the team, Cyclops walked out on his new wife Madelyne Pryor, an Alaskan pilot who bore a strange resemblance to Grey, and their infant son Nathan.

The original X-Men choose not to associate with the current team because Professor X had placed their old nemesis, Magneto, as its leader. The five original members set up a business advertised as mutant-hunters for hire, headquartered in the TriBeCa neighborhood of downtown New York City, posing as (non-superpowered) humans to their clients. The mutants that X-Factor "capture" are secretly trained to control their powers and reintegrated into society. Through their "mutant hunting" X-Factor recruit a group of young wards:

- Artie Maddicks – A pink-skinned, mute child who can project hologram-like images of his thoughts.
- Tabitha Smith – A young woman who ran away from her abusive father. Able to create handheld energy spheres that she can detonate at will, which she calls "time bombs".
- Rusty Collins – A former member of the U.S. Navy whose pyrokinesis first manifested uncontrollably, severely injuring a woman.
- Leech – A green-skinned young boy, who can dampen the mutant powers of those around him.
- Rictor – A Mexican teenager who can produce powerful seismic waves.
- Skids – A runaway who can project a protective, frictionless force field around her body.

Eventually, the team decides that the "mutant hunter" ruse did more harm than good by inflaming hatred and blame it on X-Factor's original business manager, Cameron Hodge, who is revealed as a mutant-hating mastermind.

In X-Factor #6 (1986), Louise Simonson introduced Apocalypse, who would appear in multiple issues and become X-Factor's nemesis.

In X-Factor #10, the Marauders, a group of mutant mercenaries, severely injure Angel's wings, which are later amputated. Despondent, Angel attempts suicide by detonating his airliner mid-flight, but Apocalypse rescues him and transforms him into Death, one of his Four Horsemen, giving him metal wings and blue skin. Angel escaped Apocalypse's control, but these physical changes remain. He is renamed Archangel and rejoins the X-Men in issue #36. Angel's replacement on X-Factor, Caliban, turns to Apocalypse for more power in issue #24, with Apocalypse leaving X-Factor his ship in return.

In the 1989 crossover Inferno, Madelyne Pryor is revealed to be a clone of Jean Grey created by Mister Sinister. Manipulated by demons and tormented by Scott's rejection of her, Madelyne becomes the Goblin Queen and fights X-Factor before killing herself in a suicide attack on Jean.

In the last major storyline of the first X-Factor series, published in early 1991, Apocalypse kidnaps Nathan Summers, sensing that he would grow up to be a powerful mutant and possible threat. X-Factor rescue Nathan from Apocalypse's lunar base, but find him infected with a techno-organic virus. A clan of rebels from the future, known as the Askani, send a representative to the present time to bring Nathan 2,000 years into the future to be treated. Fully grown, he returns to the 20th century as the antihero, Cable.

X-Factor, the X-Men, and several minor characters team up to fight the telepathic Shadow King in another crossover event, The Muir Island Saga. Afterward, the original members of X-Factor rejoin the X-Men and several characters from various X-Men-related series become founding members of a new X-Factor.

=== Government team (1991–1998) ===
X-Factor was recreated with new members, all of whom were already allies of the X-Men, and three of whom were involved in the Muir Island Saga. The new X-Factor worked for the Pentagon, replacing Freedom Force as the government's salaried mutant team. Their relationship with their benefactors was often strained and complicated. The new X-Factor, debuting in issue #71, included:

- Valerie Cooper – A U.S. government agent with history as both ally and adversary of the X-Men who becomes X-Factor's government liaison. She was also liaison to Freedom Force.
- Havok – A former X-Man and brother of Cyclops who metabolizes cosmic rays to generate powerful, but hard to control, plasma waves. Havok serves as X-Factor's leader.
- Multiple Man – He can create duplicates of himself on physical impact. He was previously offered X-Men membership, but he declined, opting instead to work at the Muir Island research center.
- Polaris – Havok's long-time lover, and also a former X-Man who can control magnetism. Later revealed to be Magneto's daughter.
- Quicksilver – A former member of the Brotherhood of Evil Mutants and a former Avenger, who possesses super speed and a difficult temperament.
- Strong Guy – A wise-cracking character who can re-channel kinetic energy aimed at him, transforming it into muscular mass and power. Lila Cheney's former bodyguard.
- Wolfsbane – A Scottish former New Mutant who can transform into a wolf or a werewolf-like creature. Some artificial manipulation of her feelings causes her to love Havok, bringing her much conflict and frustration because she knows he loves Polaris.

Forge, a former government weapons contractor whose mutant power is the ability to invent advanced technology, was later added to the group, first replacing Cooper as their liaison after she is compromised by one of Magneto's Acolytes, and later as an active member. Despite being human, Cooper later becomes an active member as well, her marksmanship and athletic skills compensating for her lack of superhuman powers.

In a 1995 story, Multiple Man apparently dies of the Legacy Virus, a deadly illness that attacks mutant genes, which is later revealed to have only killed one of his duplicates. Strong Guy is put into suspended animation after suffering a heart attack caused by the stress his extra mass put on his body. Wolfsbane, cured of her artificial love for Alex, transfers to the European mutant team Excalibur. Havok leaves to infiltrate a mutant terrorist ring.

A new X-Factor line-up was introduced, consisting of Forge as the team's new leader, Polaris, Cooper, and several new recruits:

- Mystique – A shapeshifting mutant criminal and master of espionage. Mystique is forced to join X-Factor following her capture by federal agents.
- Sabretooth – A homicidal mutant criminal who possesses claws, heightened senses, and a healing factor. Like Mystique, Sabretooth is a captive member that Forge controls with special technology.
- Shard – A holographic computer program with the personality of the X-Man Bishop's deceased sister of the same name. Bishop is a time-traveler from a distant future, where he and Shard are members of Xavier's Security Enforcers. The holographic Shard was brought to the 20th century with Bishop.
- Wild Child – A former member of Alpha Flight who possesses heightened senses, fangs, and claws.

The team later had a secession from government sponsorship. Multiple Man and Strong Guy appear again at the same time. Despite Forge managing to fix Strong Guy's problems, he does not rejoin the team. The popularity of X-Factor continued to dwindle and Mystique and Sabretooth, two popular X-Men villains, failed to draw in more readers. Wild Child mutates out of control, Mystique hunts down Sabretooth (who had kidnapped young Tyler Trevor Chase), and Forge breaks ties with X-Factor.

After various stories focusing on individual characters, a new team was gathered consisting of Havok, Multiple Man, Polaris, Shard, and other members of the X.S.E.: Fixx, and Greystone, who are brought to the 20th century. However, this version of the team disbands in the same issue in which they debut. In that issue, #149 (1998), Greystone builds a time machine meant to take him and his compatriots back to the future. However, the device explodes, killing Greystone and Havok. Afterward, X-Factor disbands.

The time machine's explosion transports Havok to a parallel world, populated by twisted versions of Marvel characters. He explores this strange world in the series Mutant X.

Issues	Characters
#1–9	Angel, Artie Maddicks, Beast, Cyclops, Iceman, Marvel Girl, Rusty Collins
#10–16	Angel, Artie Maddicks, Beast, Boom-Boom, Cyclops, Iceman, Marvel Girl, Rusty Collins, Skids
#17–24	Artie Maddicks, Beast, Boom-Boom, Caliban, Cyclops, Iceman, Leech, Marvel Girl, Rictor, Rusty Collins, Skids
#25–33	Artie Maddicks, Beast, Boom-Boom, Cyclops, Iceman, Leech, Marvel Girl, Rictor, Rusty Collins, Skids
#34–70	Archangel, Beast, Cyclops, Iceman, Marvel Girl
#71–93	Havok, Multiple Man, Polaris, Quicksilver, Strong Guy, Valerie Cooper, Wolfsbane
#94–102	Forge, Havok, Multiple Man, Polaris, Quicksilver, Strong Guy, Wolfsbane
#103–111	Forge, Havok, Polaris, Strong Guy, Valerie Cooper, Wolfsbane
#112–118	Forge, Havok, Mystique, Polaris, Valerie Cooper, Wild Child
#119–122	Forge, Mystique, Polaris, Sabretooth, Shard, Valerie Cooper, Wild Child
#123–128	Forge, Polaris, Sabretooth, Shard, Valerie Cooper, Wild Child
#129–142	Forge, Mystique, Polaris, Sabretooth, Shard, Valerie Cooper, Wild Child
#143–149	Archer, Fixx, Greystone, Havok, Polaris, Shard

=== Volume 2 (2002 miniseries) ===
A four-issue X-Factor limited series was launched in 2002. This series focused on the government's new Mutant Civil Rights Task Force, which consisted of humans who investigated anti-mutant hate crimes and inadvertently discovered an anti-mutant conspiracy within their own ranks.

=== Volume 3 (2005–2013) ===
X-Factor Investigations, from X-Factor (vol 3) #224.1. Art by David Yardin.

X-Factor Investigations is a detective agency run by Jamie Madrox, also known as Multiple Man. The name is taken from the government-sponsored group the three founders previously served on. The initial staff consists of Madrox's best friend and special enforcer, Guido Carosella (Strong Guy), and former teammate Rahne Sinclair (Wolfsbane). Following the events of the "House of M" storyline, Madrox's new-found wealth from winning a Who Wants to Be a Millionaire?-style game show allows him to recruit several of his former colleagues from the Paris branch of the now defunct X-Corporation. New members include:

- M (Monet St. Croix) – A wealthy ambassador's daughter with an array of superhuman powers.
- Rictor (Julio Richter) – A Mexican mutant who can produce powerful seismic waves.
- Siryn (Theresa Cassidy) – Banshee's daughter with similar sonic-based powers.
- Layla Miller – A young mutant who inserts herself into the group to keep them from discovering the truth behind the "Decimation" storyline.

The new series opens with a suicide attempt by Rictor, who has lost his powers. The series deals with the group's attempt to unravel the truth behind the "Decimation" and its aftermath, fighting with Singularity Investigations, and dealing with Madrox's powers and their consequences.

During the "Messiah Complex" storyline, Jamie and Layla travel to a dystopian future in which mutants are persecuted and imprisoned. Jamie escapes and returns to the early 21st century, but Layla is still trapped. Rahne fears (because of a glimpse she has had of the future) that she, while in her wolf shape, will murder Jamie and Layla. To prevent this, she quits the team and joins X-Force. Rictor also quits. Jamie travels to the future with the help of an aged Layla Miller and helps a rebellion led by a cyborg Scott Summers and his daughter Ruby, while the rest of the team is in the present. After battling Arcade, who captured Rictor (who then rejoins), the team meets one of Jamie's duplicates, who calls himself Cortex and is joined by new members:

- Longshot – A genetically created humanoid from the Mojoverse who can manipulate probability, making unlikely events happen in his favor.
- Darwin (Armando Muñoz) – One of Moira's early recruits, he possesses reactive evolution, allowing him to evolve his body rapidly and adapt to various situations.
- Shatterstar (Gaveedra Seven) – A founding X-Force member who can create dimensional portals and channel vibratory shockwave through his swords.

=== All-New X-Factor (2014–2015) ===
The next incarnation of the series was All-New X-Factor, and depicts the corporation "Serval Industries" forming a new corporate-sponsored version of the team, which includes Polaris, Quicksilver, Gambit, Danger, Cypher, and Warlock.

=== Volume 4 (2020–2021) ===
X-Factor was relaunched and the new team investigates cases of missing mutants and presumed deaths for Krakoa, confirming if they can be resurrected:

- Northstar (Jean-Paul Beaubier) – Team leader and former Alpha Flight member with superhuman speed.
- Polaris (Lorna Dane) – An X-Factor alumna who can control metal.
- Prestige (Rachel Summers) – A telekinetic and telepathic mutant from a dystopian future.
- Daken (Akihiro) – Wolverine's son with similar powers to his father.
- Eye-Boy (Trevor Hawkins) – A young mutant with multiple eyes all over his body.
- Prodigy (David Alleyne) – A former Young Avengers and Xavier Institute student who can mimic other skills and knowledge.
- Aurora (Jeanne-Marie Beaubier) – The twin sister of Northstar with the same power.

The team works closely with the Five, a circuit of mutants introduced in House of X/Powers of X working in conjunction to resurrect fallen mutants:

- Egg (Fabio Medina) – Produces a limitless amount of unviable biological eggs.
- Proteus (Kevin MacTaggert) – Transforms the unviable egg into a viable one.
- Elixir (Joshua Foley) – Biologically kickstarts the process of life, initializing cell replication and husk growth.
- Tempus (Eva Bell) – Matures the husk to a desired age.
- Hope Summers – Enhances and synthesizes the other resurrection mutants' powers to ensure the success of each resurrection.

== X-Factor members ==
The first team of X-Factor was founded by the five founding members of X-Men.

Original team
Character codename(s)	Real name	Issue joined in
Marvel Girl	Jean Elaine Grey	X-Factor #1 (February 1986)
Angel / Archangel	Warren Kenneth Worthington III	X-Factor #1 (February 1986)
Beast	Henry "Hank" Philip McCoy	X-Factor #1 (February 1986)
Iceman	Robert "Bobby" Louis Drake	X-Factor #1 (February 1986)
Cyclops	Scott Summers	X-Factor #1 (February 1986)
Caliban		X-Factor #17 (June 1987)

Federal team
Character codename(s)	Real name	Active in
Polaris	Lorna Dane	X-Factor #71 (October 1991)
Multiple Man	James "Jamie" Arthur Madrox	X-Factor #71 (October 1991)
Strong Guy	Guido Carosella	X-Factor #71 (October 1991)
Havok	Alexander "Alex" Summers	X-Factor #71 (October 1991)
Wolfsbane	Rahne Sinclair	X-Factor #71 (October 1991)
Valerie Cooper		X-Factor #71 (October 1991)
Quicksilver	Pietro Maximoff	X-Factor #72 (November 1991)
Random	Marshall Evan Stone III	X-Factor #92 (July 1993)
Forge		X-Factor #93 (August 1993)
Mystique	Raven Darkhölme	X-Factor #114 (September 1995)
Wild Child	Kyle Gibney	X-Factor #114 (September 1995)
Shard	Shard Bishop	X-Factor #119 (February 1996)
Sabretooth	Victor Creed	X-Factor #120 (March 1996)
Archer		X-Factor #144 (April 1998)
Fixx		X-Factor #144 (April 1998)
Greystone	Devlin Greystone	X-Factor #145 (April 1998)
Angel	Warren Kenneth Worthington III	X-Factor, vol. 5 #1 (August 2024)
Firefist	Russell "Rusty" Collins	X-Factor, vol. 5 #1 (August 2024)
Xyber	Daniel Choi	X-Factor, vol. 5 #1 (August 2024)
Feral	Maria Callasantos	X-Factor, vol. 5 #1 (August 2024)
Cameo		X-Factor, vol. 5 #1 (August 2024)
Cecilia Reyes		X-Factor, vol. 5 #1 (August 2024)
Frenzy	Joanna Cargill	X-Factor, vol. 5 #1 (August 2024)
Granny Smite		X-Factor, vol. 5 #1 (August 2024)
Pyro	St. John Allerdyce	X-Factor, vol. 5 #1 (August 2024)
Wintergeist	Oskar	X-Factor, vol. 5 #4 (November 2024)
ForgetMeNot	Xabi	X-Factor, vol. 5 #7 (February 2025)

X-Factor Investigations
Character codename(s)	Real name	Issue joined in
Multiple Man	James "Jamie" Arthur Madrox	Madrox #5 (January 2005)
Strong Guy	Guido Carosella	Madrox #5 (January 2005)
Wolfsbane	Rahne Sinclair	Madrox #5 (January 2005)
Siryn / Banshee	Theresa Rourke Cassidy	X-Factor, vol. 3 #1 (December 2005)
M	Monet Yvette Clarisse Maria Therese St. Croix	X-Factor, vol. 3 #1 (December 2005)
Butterfly	Layla Rose Miller	X-Factor, vol. 3 #1 (December 2005)
Rictor	Julio Esteban Richter	X-Factor, vol. 3 #2 (January 2006)
Darwin	Armando Muñoz	X-Factor, vol. 3 #33 (July 2008)
Longshot		X-Factor, vol. 3 #33 (July 2008)
Shatterstar	Gaveedra-Seven	X-Factor #200 (December 2009)
Havok	Alexander "Alex" Summers	X-Factor #230 (January 2012)
Polaris	Lorna Dane	X-Factor #230 (January 2012)
Northstar	Jean-Paul Beaubier	X-Factor, vol. 4 #1 (July 2020)
Prodigy	David Alleyne	X-Factor, vol. 4 #1 (July 2020)
Prestige	Rachel "Ray" Anne Summers	X-Factor, vol. 4 #1 (July 2020)
Eye-Boy	Trevor Hawkins	X-Factor, vol. 4 #1 (July 2020)
Daken	Akihiro	X-Factor, vol. 4 #1 (July 2020)
Aurora	Jeanne-Marie Beaubier	X-Factor, vol. 4 #7 (February 2021)
X-Factor Investigations allies
Pip the Troll	Pip Gofern	X-Factor #213 (2011)

Corporate team
Character codename(s)	Real name	Issue joined in
Polaris	Lorna Dane	All-New X-Factor #1 (January 2014)
Gambit	Remy Etienne LeBeau	All-New X-Factor #1 (January 2014)
Quicksilver	Pietro Maximoff	All-New X-Factor #1 (January 2014)
Danger		All-New X-Factor #4 (March 2014)
Cypher	Douglas "Doug" Aaron Ramsey	All-New X-Factor #6 (April 2014)
Warlock		All-New X-Factor #6 (April 2014)
Decay	Georgia Dakei	All-New X-Factor #8 (May 2014)

== Other versions ==
=== Ultimate Marvel ===
In the "Ultimate Marvel reality, X-Factor appears in Ultimate War #4 as a U.S. operated mutant prison camp in Cuba.

=== X-Men '92 ===
X-Factor appears in X-Men '92 as a peace keeping force that was formed following the X-Men's disappearance.

== In other media ==
The second incarnation of X-Factor appears in X-Men: The Animated Series, consisting of Forge, Polaris, Multiple Man, Strong Guy, Quicksilver, Havok, and Wolfsbane. The team returns in the second season of X-Men '97, with Quicksilver absent. Polaris later leaves the team and is replaced by Siryn.
