= Layla Miller =

Marvel Comics superhero

- Layla Miller as depicted in X-Factor #208 (October 2010). Art by Emanuela Lupacchino.

Publication information
- Publisher: Marvel Comics
- First appearance: House of M #4 (Sept. 2005)
- Created by: Brian Michael Bendis; Olivier Coipel

In-story information
- Full name: Layla Rose Miller-Madrox
- Species: Human Mutant
- Team affiliations: X-Factor Investigations; Summers Rebellion; X-Corps
- Partnerships: Doctor Doom; Ruby Summers
- Notable aliases: Butterfly, Layla Madrox
- Abilities: Resurrecting the dead; Extensive knowledge of past and future events; Power gauntlet capable of various effects; Basic knowledge of magic and mysticism

Layla Rose Miller, also known as Butterfly, is a fictional character appearing in American comic books published by Marvel Comics. She first appeared in House of M #4 (Sept. 2005), and was created by Brian Michael Bendis and Olivier Coipel. Peter David later developed the character, placing Layla at the center of the ensemble of mutant private detectives in his title X-Factor.

Layla Miller is a mutant with the ability to resurrect the dead, albeit without their souls. She is a key figure in the reversal of the House of M reality, as she helps return the memories of other characters. The character initially seemed to have an extensive knowledge of future events, claiming that she "knows stuff". This was revealed to be a product of time travel within her own timeline, where a future version of the character uploaded memories into her younger self.

== Publication history ==
Layla Miller was introduced in House of M #4 (Sept. 2005), and was created by Brian Michael Bendis and Olivier Coipel. She appeared for the remainder of the limited series, before being reintroduced into the mainstream Marvel Universe in X-Factor (Vol. 3) #1 (January 2006), becoming a main cast member of the book until the book ended with X-Factor #262 (November 2013). She received a one-shot, X-Factor Special: Layla Miller, in October 2008. The character would not appear for a few years until being reintroduced in X-Corp #3 (September 2021) during the Krakoan Age, then as a member of X-Corps in X-Men Unlimited Infinity Comics #21 (February 2022), additionally appearing in #92-95 ("Downtime") and the "External Threat" arc.

== Fictional character biography ==
=== House of M ===
Layla Miller is first seen as a young mutant girl who lives in Hell's Kitchen in New York City. When she wakes up one morning, she finds everything has changed and she is one of a small number of unaffected characters. Layla is instrumental in bringing down the "House of M" by using her ability to restore the memories of superheroes who rebelled and helped restore reality. Doctor Strange suggested that Scarlet Witch, who created the House of M reality, created Layla as a failsafe to help the heroes in case something went wrong.

=== X-Factor Investigations ===
After Layla joins X-Factor Investigations, she takes steps to deal with Singularity Investigations, a rival investigations firm. When X-Factor have their final showdown with Singularity Investigations, she helps uncover the fact that Guido Carosella had been brainwashed by them at some point in his past while rescuing a client. Jamie Madrox organizes all X-Factor members to see Doc Samson for psychiatric evaluations; they play chess and she reveals she is willing to make sacrifices for the greater good and that even she is expendable.

=== X-Cell and Nicole ===
A group made up of ex-mutants by the name of X-Cell, who believe the government has depowered mutants, hides in Mutant Town. When Siryn and Monet return from France, they bring an ex-mutant named Nicole, which shocks Layla because she did not know of her arrival. Layla visits Quicksilver, who had restored most of X-Cell's powers. She reveals to Callisto and Marrow that it was he and Wanda Maximoff who caused the Decimation; the government did not depower them, and Pietro has lied. After a failed attempt on Layla's life, Nicole is tripped by Layla and falls in front of a train, which destroys her, revealing she was actually a robot.

Around this time, Daisy Johnson offers Layla to join Nick Fury's Secret Warriors, but she declines, claiming the mutants will need her more.

=== Messiah Complex ===
Layla goes with one of Jamie's dupes to investigate an alternate future caused by the birth of the mutant messiah. While there, they discover that the mutants are living in internment camps. While in an internment camp, the mutant scanners alternate between detecting Layla as a mutant and as a human. They learn from a child version of Bishop that the mutant messiah had caused this world. Layla kills the dupe to send the information back to the original Jamie, leaving her alone and stranded in the future.

Layla eventually returns to the past, though she is considerably older than when she had departed. Assuming the guise of a nun, she begins working alongside John Maddox, a duplicate of Jamie Madrox who had chosen to live a domestic life with his family. Upon arriving at John's church, Layla encounters Jamie at the moment he is attempting to take his own life. She intervenes, prevents the act, and discloses her true identity, leaving Jamie visibly shocked. After Layla and Jamie argue about how they never came for one another, the two finally give into their emotions and share a kiss. Jamie is awkward about starting a relationship with Layla, feeling she is still a child, though Layla tells him she never really was.

Layla, Jamie, and Ruby Summers go find an old, frail Doctor Doom, requesting his help with time travel. Doom reveals he has met Layla before and informs the trio about Doomlocks. They are then attacked by Sentinels and saved by Trevor Fitzroy. They bring the frail Doom back to their stronghold in Atlantic City where she gets into an argument with Cyclops about bringing him with them and Fitzroy's future. Taking Doom to an old lab, he creates a Doomlock and turns on them, bringing forth Cortex, a rogue clone of Jamie. Cortex kills Fitzroy, and Ruby asks Layla if she can bring him back. Layla reveals that she has the ability to resurrect the dead at the cost of their soul, conscience and morality.

Following the conclusion of the battle, Layla explains the nature of her powers to Jamie. The two are displaced in time by a Doomlock device: Jamie is returned to X-Factor, while Layla is transported to a point in time prior to her involvement with X-Factor Investigations. She arrives at the orphanage where she had lived before M-Day and, after conversing with her younger self, initiates the chain of events that will eventually lead to her joining X-Factor. Layla accomplishes this by transferring her accumulated knowledge into her younger counterpart's mind. Upon recovering, Layla departs, reflecting on the consequences of her actions.

=== Return to present ===
Following the disappearance of the Invisible Woman, it is revealed Layla has been living with Doctor Doom in an advisory capacity for a year, awaiting to cross paths with X-Factor while they search for Susan Richards.

During the events of Second Coming, Bastion assigns Bolivar Trask and the Mutant Response Division to kill every member of X-Factor Investigations. Arriving at Dublin Airport, Layla and Shatterstar have come to the aid of Theresa Cassidy, who is now going by the codename Banshee. During the confrontation, Layla uses technology acquired from Doom to combat the MRD soldiers and point Monet in the right direction to help turn the tide of the battle.

When the demon Bloodbath attacks X-Factor, Jamie is unexpectedly killed. After Jamie is brought back from the dead, Layla states that she knew Jamie would be back and gives into her feelings for him. She proceeds to warm up Jamie from his frozen state by having sex with him. After their tryst, Layla proceeds to tell Jamie about the changes in X-Factor Investigations during his time away. Layla and Jamie elope to Las Vegas and get married, but their honeymoon is cut short when the wedding priest is murdered.

=== Retirement ===
After the events of the "Hell on Earth War" storyline, she and Jamie retire to his family farm where they have a child together. Some time later, one of Jamie's clones goes to Muir Island to investigate the Terrigen Mists and is killed by the M-Pox. Soon afterwards, a different Jamie appears to take care of her and Davey. After a while, Logan reappears, asking her advice on what to do with Cyclops and the missing X-Men. She also encourages the new Jamie to help Cyclops.

== Powers and abilities ==
Layla has the mutant power to resurrect someone from death, at the cost of their soul. They retain their memories but experience a lack of empathy upon resurrection that is similar to sociopathy. Although this was first hinted at in the conclusion of X-Factor's initial story arc when Layla brought a butterfly back to life, it was not fully expanded upon and explained until much later when Layla resurrected Trevor Fitzroy, knowing full well the murderous villain he would become due to her actions.

Layla has extensive knowledge of past and future events, which enables her to see paths of causality to their conclusion and allows her to alter certain events from occurring. Her knowledge is later revealed to be the result of her older self (time-displaced and aged due to the events of X-Men: Messiah Complex) visiting herself as a child prior to the events of X-Factor vol. 3 #1 and uploading all her knowledge and memories into her younger self's brain. The sheer volume of knowledge was too much for her brain to take, and thus resulted in several gaps and blind spots in her knowledge.

Layla gained above-average scientific knowledge and advanced weaponry from her partnership with and tutelage under Doctor Doom. She gained a basic knowledge of magic and mysticism, which allows her to cast basic spells and perform exorcisms.

During House of M, Layla was immune to the memory alteration created by the Scarlet Witch and thus was aware that reality had been altered. Layla also had the ability to "awaken" heroes and allow them to remember their lives before the reality warp.

== Reception ==
- The Layla Miller one-shot received positive reviews from multiple sources.
- AIPT Comics included Layla Miller in the list of "The 7 X-Men that deserve a solo series".
- CBR included her knowledge transfer in "Best Marvel Plot Twists of All Time", as a positive point in the House of M storyline, 9th in "Best X-Factor Members, Ranked", and 2nd in "The 20 Most Confusing Mutant Powers, Finally eXplained".
- Gamespot included Layla Miller in "27 X-Men With Truly Awful Mutant Powers".
