= Infinity Abyss =

2002 Marvel Comics series

- Cover to Infinity Abyss #1 (Aug. 2002); Art by Jim Starlin.

Publication information
- Publisher: Marvel Comics
- Schedule: Bi-monthly
- Format: Limited series
- Genre: , science fiction, superhero
- Publication date: Aug.–Oct. 2002
- No. of issues: 6
- Main character(s): Thanos; Adam Warlock; Gamora; Pip the Troll; Captain Marvel; Doctor Strange; Spider-Man; Moondragon; Thanosi

Creative team
- Written by: Jim Starlin
- Penciller: Jim Starlin
- Inker: Al Milgrom
- Letterer: Jack Morelli
- Colorist: Christie Scheele

Collected editions
- Infinity Abyss: ISBN 0-7851-0985-4

Infinity Abyss is a six-issue comic book limited series published by Marvel Comics from August to October in 2002. The series was written and pencilled by Jim Starlin.

== Plot summary ==
The series centers on the Thanosi, five failed genetic experiments by the Titan Thanos, with each being a clone of his DNA and modelled on other beings, including the characters Professor X; Doctor Strange; Gladiator; Iron Man and Galactus. Obsessed with nihilism and a desire to end the universe, the five Thanosi – called X; Mystic; Warrior; Armor and Omega – attempt to kill the original Thanos by creating a black hole in space. X then impersonates Thanos and directs character Pip the Troll to kidnap a recovering Adam Warlock on an alien planet.

X requires information from Warlock, who previously made contact with an entity called the Anchor of Reality. By killing this being and preventing it from locating a successor, the Thanosi clones will therefore end the universe. The female mercenary Gamora locates the real Thanos, and with the aid of Warlock and heroes Doctor Strange; Spider-Man; Captain Marvel and Moondragon the Titan neutralizes four of the five clones. Omega arrives on Earth to kill the successor to the Anchor of Reality and to destroy the Earth, and is teleported with the heroes to a barren planet where they battle. Thanos transports the heroes back to Earth, and then has a fleet of alien mercenaries destroy the planet, killing the final clone. A human girl called Atleza is able to become the new Anchor of Reality unchallenged, ending the threat.

== Collected editions ==
The series has been collected into a trade paperback:

- Infinity Abyss (collects Infinity Abyss limited series, 176 pages, 2003, ISBN 0-7851-0985-4)
