= Jamie Madrox =

James Arthur "Jamie" Madrox Multiple Man
- Jamie Madrox, the Multiple Man. Art by David Lloyd from the cover of Madrox #2.

Publication information
- Publisher: Marvel Comics
- First appearance: Giant Size Fantastic Four #4 (February 1975)
- Created by: Len Wein

In-story information
- Alter ego: James Arthur "Jamie" Madrox
- Species: Human mutant
- Team affiliations: X-Factor Investigations; Muir Island X-Men; X-Factor; X-Corps; X-Corporation; Fallen Angels; Nasty Boys; S.H.I.E.L.D. Hydra
- Notable aliases: Multiple Man; Madrox the Multiple Man; Reverend; John Maddox
- Abilities: Self-duplication

James Arthur "Jamie" Madrox, also called the Multiple Man, is a character appearing in American comic books published by Marvel Comics. Created by writer/editor Len Wein, he first appeared in Giant-Size Fantastic Four #4 (February 1975).

A mutant with the ability to create instant duplicates of himself, Jamie Madrox was a minor or supporting character for most of his early comic book appearances. This changed following his inclusion in the 1987 miniseries Fallen Angels, written by Jo Duffy. The character underwent greater development under writer Peter David through his appearance in David's run of the monthly series X-Factor (vol. 1) in the 1990s, and in David's second and ongoing run of the title (vol. 3) in the 2000s.

The character has appeared in several media adaptations outside of comics, and was portrayed by Eric Dane in the 2006 film X-Men: The Last Stand.

== Creation ==
Len Wein spoke on the creation of the character stating he wanted to name the character Xerox after the popular copying machine.

"My original name for the character was Jamie ZERROX (Zerrox, the Multiple Man. Get it? Boy, was I clever in those days, When I passed the name by then Editor-in-Chief Roy Thomas, he looked at me like I had three heads. "You're kidding, right?" he said. "Who's gonna pay off the huge lawsuit, you?" "But it's not even spelled the same," I said. "Not happening," said Roy. So I came up with a bunch of alternative until I came up with Madrox, that sounded like an action word, and thus it has been ever since."

== Publication history ==
Jamie Madrox first appeared in Giant-Size Fantastic Four #4. In the 1990s, he played a major role in the series X-Factor. Writer Peter David later admitted that he was unhappy that he had to use Madrox in X-Factor, and it was only over the course of writing the series that he became one of his favorite characters. A MadroX miniseries was published in 2004, also written by David. He and the other members of his detective agency later starred in a revamped X-Factor monthly series that was again written by Peter David.

In 2018, he was featured in a second five-part solo series called Multiple Man written by Matthew Rosenberg and drawn by Andy MacDonald.

== Fictional character biography ==
=== Early life ===
Jamie Madrox was born to a family living near the Los Alamos research facility in New Mexico; the background radiation may have stimulated his mutation. When Jamie is born, the doctor's slap causes him to multiply into two identical babies. Professor Charles Xavier, a friend of the Madrox family, suggests that they move to Kansas to raise the boy in privacy. Dr. Daniel Madrox, Jamie's father, creates a suit for him to wear which is designed to absorb kinetic energy, the source of the duplication.

Later, Damian Tryp of Singularity Investigations makes his own offer to look after Jamie, claiming that Jamie is not just a normal mutant, but actually a "changeling", a predecessor to mutants who develops powers at birth. Jamie's parents refuse to give their son to Tryp. When Jamie is fifteen years old, his parents are killed by a tornado alleged to have been caused by Tryp, and Jamie is left to run the family farm by himself. He does so with the help of his duplicates, or "dupes", until his suit is damaged.

=== Muir Island ===
Jamie Madrox goes to New York City for help where he meets Mister Fantastic of the Fantastic Four. He contacts Professor Xavier, who sends the youth to Muir Island with Moira MacTaggert, to work in her laboratory and help her with research. He later helps Moira and fellow mutants Havok and Polaris in searching for the escaped mutant Proteus. Proteus hijacks one of Madrox's duplicates as his own body, although this does not harm Madrox. Following the X-Men's battle with Proteus on Muir Island, Madrox is invited to join the X-Men, but he declines.

One of Jamie's renegade duplicates joins Siryn in the search for runaway New Mutants Sunspot and Warlock. After finding the two, Jamie joins the Fallen Angels.

=== X-Factor ===
Jamie Madrox is one of the residents of Muir Island who comes under the mental control of the Shadow King. Following the destruction of Muir Island and the defeat of the Shadow King, he becomes a member of the second incarnation of the X-Factor team, which is assembled by Valerie Cooper as a U.S. government response team. Here, he develops a reputation as a prankster, forming a friendship with teammate Strong Guy. Also on the team is former New Mutant Wolfsbane who later joins his X-Factor Investigations.

In the first day of the team, one of his duplicates is shot and killed, and Madrox learns for the first time that he cannot absorb a deceased duplicate. This makes him realize for the first time how independent his duplicates actually are. This becomes clearer to him when a duplicate, working for Mister Sinister, decides that it wants to absorb the original, which it does for a short time, until Jamie's dominant personality breaks free and reabsorbs the wayward dupe.

After he is exposed to the Legacy Virus while performing CPR on an infected Genoshan mutate, Jamie is forced to kill the Acolyte Seamus Mellencamp in self-defense. The clone later died from the Legacy Virus. The real Jamie survives, but sustains amnesia.

Jamie is the motivation for the government-sponsored version of X-Factor to break ties with the government and go underground when the team is tricked into thinking Jamie and his duplicates are actually a squad of super-powered terrorists. Eventually, the team discovers this was a manipulation and the group goes rogue, splitting from the government.

He then serves as majority staff for Banshee's X-Corps. Banshee hires ex-criminals to police other mutants but things get bad when Mystique goes on a murderous rampage and has Mastermind's daughter mind control them. The X-Men manage to defeat the renegade X-Corps members, he transfers to one of Xavier's official "non X-Men" mutant teams in Paris's X-Corporation, fighting Weapon XII in the Channel which results in the death of teammate Darkstar.

=== Mutant Town ===
After the fall of the X-Corporation, Jamie Madrox begins working as a private detective in the "Mutant Town" area of New York, along with former X-Factor teammates Wolfsbane and Strong Guy. In the passing time, Madrox has been sending out his duplicates to lead lives of their own. Among these dupes are a Shaolin monk and an Olympic gymnast. By this point, his powers are developed to such an extent that any dupe who gains sufficient skills can pass their knowledge to Jamie, giving him a wide variety of training instantly.

The side effect of excessive withdrawal from absorbing the duplicates leads him to gain their new personalities as well, which gives him a form of dissociative identity disorder, in which any new dupes may spontaneously generate any individual personality aspect of Jamie Prime, making them unpredictable, as they more often than not disobey his orders or manifest as personalities that are too volatile or meek.

=== X-Factor Investigations ===
Following the elimination of all but a couple of hundred mutants from the face of the Earth in the "House of M" storyline, it is revealed that Jamie Madrox has upgraded his private detective agency to a new building, under the name X-Factor Investigations. He bought the building using money from a Who Wants to Be a Millionaire-type show, using a room full of dupes as lifelines.

Still suffering from uncontrollable duplicate personalities, Jamie sends one to talk a de-powered Rictor out of jumping off a building who instead pushes him off. The dupe calls himself "The X-Factor" and threatens Madrox that he will come out whenever dupes are made, and Madrox will not be able to tell before being reabsorbed, and Jamie's new team adds Rictor to the group, along with M and Siryn. Celebrating a victory after discovering he is not a mutant, but a changeling (see opening biography entry), Jamie has sex with Siryn, and an accidentally forgotten duplicate with M. When Jamie discovers and absorbs the duplicate, both women are furious with him.

Later, Layla Miller, without a home after House of M's reality is shattered, reveals to Jamie that one day they will get married, and Wolfsbane will kill them both on their wedding night.

During "Civil War", a duplicate Jamie had created a few years ago eventually becomes an agent of S.H.I.E.L.D.; since he is an enforcer of the Superhuman Registration Act, he registered M and Rictor. However, the true Jamie and X-Factor stand opposed to the legislation, going so far as to make a public statement regarding their position, leading Jamie to go in direct opposition to the neutral stance taken by X-Men leader Cyclops upset at for Jamie withholding the truth about M-Day. Jamie also declares that the empty Mutant Town will be a sanctuary for superheroes being pursued by the government.

Agent Madrox met "his" end when he was surprised and re-absorbed by the original Madrox during an investigation of a Hydra cell. Jamie continues the task of hunting down his stray duplicates and reabsorbing them, but he leaves one, John Maddox, who has carved out a life for himself as an Episcopal priest, husband and father, and Jamie decided not to reabsorb him. Siryn also discovers that she is pregnant by Jamie.

==== "Messiah Complex" ====
During the 2007 - 2008 "Messiah Complex" storyline, Cyclops sends Jamie Madrox and Layla Miller to go see Forge having built a machine that allows to monitor alternate timelines. Madrox sends two dupes to find information on two timelines that showed "spikes", after the birth of the Mutant baby, due to two different timelines: one in which the newborn becomes the planet's savior and another where it becomes its dominator. Before anyone can react, Layla jumps into the portal along with one of the dupes, and Madrox collapses into a coma.

Layla and one Madrox duplicate arrive eighty years in the negative future to discover that the mutant race has been severely decimated. Mutants are imprisoned in concentration camps overseen by humans. Layla and the dupe are captured and tattooed with an "M" for mutant over their eyes. There, they encounter a youthful Lucas Bishop that would gladly go back in time to kill the mutant baby responsible for the way this timeline has turned out. Layla straps a stolen grenade to the duplicate, killing him and sending his memories of the event back to Jamie so he can tell of Bishop's treachery. When Jamie awakens, he develops an M tattoo because his body takes on scarring from duplicates. Jamie leaves and returns to X-Factor Investigations, disillusioned due to Layla's loss.

The other duplicate later returns as the character Cortex.

==== Sean ====
Siryn goes into labor and proposes to Jamie Madrox, who accepts. Siryn gives birth to a boy, named Sean after her own father. Just hours after his birth, however, Sean, much to the horror of Jamie, Theresa and X-Factor, is absorbed into Jamie's body as Jamie holds the boy, completely against Jamie's will. Jamie realizes that the baby must have been fathered by a dupe rather than by him, and that "the offspring of a dupe isn't really anything more than a dupe". Siryn, filled with rage toward Jamie, breaks his finger and tells him to leave, making it clear that the only reason she is not doing worse is that she understands on a conscious level that Jamie did not do that on purpose.

Jamie goes to see his preacher dupe John Maddox. Jamie realizes that if the child of a dupe is merely an "infant dupe", then John's son should have been absorbed either by John himself, or when Jamie ruffled the boy's hair; therefore John's son must not be his. John admits that he already knows his wife had an affair. Jamie reveals that he plans to kill himself over the grief caused by Sean, but is prevented by a holographic projection of an adult Layla Miller who takes him into the future.

==== Summers Rebellion ====
Jamie Madrox is transported to the future in the midst of the Summers Rebellion, where mutants rise up against Sentinel and human oppressors, which is led by Ruby Summers, the daughter of Cyclops and Emma Frost, with Cyclops's optic blasts and Emma's organic mineral body, Layla Miller, and a cyborg Cyclops whose predicament is Jamie's fault.

After kissing Layla (now an adult) out of happiness at seeing her, Cyclops wants Jamie to find out why some mutants are winking out of existence. The group visit an aging senile Doctor Doom who says Layla told him in the past that he'd have to instruct Jamie and her on something in the future, and it is now.

In the present, a former mutant named Lenore ask assistance to X-Factor, claiming that someone was trying to kill her. She felt she was being followed, but every time she looked, it was a different person doing it. Her best friend Candy, another former mutant, was found dead of a gunshot wound which the police ruled a suicide. Lenore did not believe it, because Candy had a pathological fear of guns. Before Candy died, she told Lenore that she thought she was being followed. Later, Lenore's mother showed up at Lenore's apartment and attempted to shoot her, but was foiled by Longshot. Escaping, Lenore's mother took Darwin hostage. At the last minute, she turned the gun on herself, but it backfired due to Longshot's luck powers. At the hospital, Monet St. Croix attempted to read Lenore's mother's mind, but was overpowered and collapsed. When she woke up, she grabbed Longshot's throat and said "Cortex".

While Strong Guy and Rictor were visiting John Maddox in Vermont, Shatterstar busted through the window and tried to stab Rictor, saying only "Cortex". Once freed of Cortex' control, Shatterstar and Rictor shared a passionate kiss. When Cortex tried to bring Longshot under his mental and physical control, he noted that Longshot and Shatterstar were in many ways identical.

Once she calmed down, Monet told the group that her violent outburst was because of psychic feedback that occurred after she had broken through a psychic barrier in Lenore's mother's mind, but that whatever was controlling her had fled. She then manipulated the group into moving Lenore out of her apartment and hiding her in a penthouse suite in an expensive hotel. There she tried to seduce Darwin, but he figured out that she was acting out of character only to try to get Lenore alone, and so resisted. Monet's body turned bright purple and became covered in tint lights and circuitry. She said that she would then have to kill Darwin, even though he was not on Cortex's list. This suggests that whatever Monet had become, she was acting somewhat independently of Cortex himself while receiving instructions from him.

When Cortex loses control over Monet, he is attacked and his hood falls back revealing that he is a duplicate of Madrox. Having his identity uncovered Cortex reveals himself as the second duplicate sent to one of the two "remaining" futures for mutantkind during the "Messiah Complex", to search for a cure for the depowering of 98% of the world's mutants following M-Day, then die in some fashion so that his memories would be transferred back to Madrox.

How this duplicate travelled from the alternative future he was sent to Earth-1191 remains a mystery. The only thing known is that under the direction of Anthony Falcone, who in turn was under the guidance of Damian Tryp from Earth-616, this duplicate was turned into a "doomlock", a chronal variance inhibitor which stops the creation of divergent timelines, which required massive cybernetic modification of his body. He was then sent back in time from Earth-1191 to Earth-616 to kill a list of specific individuals, including Multiple Man, for fear how they might affect the future. As Cortex, Madrox's duplicate apparently has the power to mentally control several people at once.

Meanwhile, on Earth-1191, the Multiple Man was tasked by Cyclops with discovering why certain people seemed to be blinking out and then back into existence. Multiple Man theorized that someone might be altering the past to affect the future. Cortex was attempting to kill Lenore to prevent Hecat'e (of the Summers Rebellion) from being born.

==== 2010–present ====
During the 2010 "Chaos War" storyline, Multiple Man is among the heroes assembled by Hercules to help combat the forces of Amatsu-Mikaboshi. Multiple Man's deceased clones return from the dead alongside the other X-Men that died in battle.

In the 2012 "They Keep Killing Madrox" storyline, Jamie Madrox is fatally impaled by a demon named Bloodbath, and finds himself being repeatedly transported to a series of alternate Earths, including one in which Layla Miller was murdered on the night of her marriage to Madrox by Rahne Sinclair's daughter, another in which Captain America has become Deathlok, and another in which Doctor Strange has been killed by the demonic Dormammu. When Madrox returns to his own Earth, the overjoyed Layla Miller passionately confesses feelings to him. The X-Factor team then discover that Deathlok, Rahne's daughter, and Dormammu have been transported to Madrox's home Earth as well. Madrox and Layla later marry in Las Vegas without incident. After the events of the Hell on Earth War, Jamie and Layla retire and decide to live on Madrox's family farm.

During the 2016 "Death of X" storyline, Madrox and his dupes die from the Terrigen Mist, alerting the X-Men to the danger of the Mist.

In the 2018 miniseries Multiple Man, one of Madrox's dupes is found locked in a bunker on Muir Island, and brought to the X-Men. This dupe is revealed to embody the treacherous aspects of the original Madrox and deliberately locked himself up for several years to find a way to become the new Jamie Prime. However, tests reveal that he is also inflicted with the M-Pox. The dupe convinces Beast to create a serum that would allow him to become the new Prime. He also steals a time machine from Bishop and goes into the future, and becomes the emperor of a totalitarian regime that is policed by his own dupes, although he is opposed by a Resistance that is mostly composed of his other dupes who do not approve his ways. The dupes from the Resistance are sent into the timestream to find help from a heroic-time traveling Madrox, who is revealed to be the Emperor from the further in the future who had a change of heart. After the death of the Emperor, all of the dupes die. However, one of the dupes, who was supposed to find Tony Stark, ends up becoming a bartender on a beach. He survives the Emperor's death, as he was in a different time period at the time, and only returns to the present-day after that time period took a turn for the worse, as evident by the "X" tattoo over his right eye. He takes the serum Beast made for him and sets out to find the wife and child of the original Madrox.

During the 2019 "Uncanny X-Men" storyline, Madrox rejoins Cyclops's new team of X-Men. A number of his clones are killed by Sentinels after acting as a human shield for his teammates.

== Powers and abilities ==
Jamie Madrox has the power to create perfect copies of himself, which he calls "dupes", and all items on his person (clothing, weaponry, etc.) through impact when he absorbs kinetic energy (although this sometimes has happened at will) through an unknown process. Most of the time, this is caused by him snapping his fingers, stomping his foot, being struck, or collisions. Each of the duplicates has exactly the same power as Jamie himself, and has independent thought, though Madrox "Prime" is usually telepathically and empathically linked to the dupes. His powers have, at least once, been shown to affect the actual design of the shirt he was wearing.

Jamie "Prime" can absorb a dupe back into himself at will, which also makes him absorb the memories, knowledge, and skills of the duplicate. The dupe usually appears right beside the body it "springs" from. It has been noted that dupes have trouble creating more dupes themselves if they have not used their powers for a while, while Madrox is able to use his ability whenever he wants without any such issue.

Jamie was formerly unable to control the duplication process, wearing a special shock-absorbent synthetic stretch fabric costume that contained mechanisms that absorbed kinetic energy so that an army of Madroxes would not instantly appear every time he was struck. The original suit was designed by his father, Dr. Daniel Madrox, and later modified by Reed Richards. Jamie currently wears a stylized shirt with only six large green shock-absorbent pads on the front of the torso. Whether this indicates a greater degree of control over when his dupes manifest, an advance in technology or if it is simply an ordinary shirt with the same design is unclear.

During his time with X-Factor, the maximum number of dupes Madrox could create, including duplicates of the dupes themselves, was approximately 50, but the limit has grown far beyond that, as when Hydra tried to manipulate Jamie into becoming one of them. Their plan backfired because he cannot be mind-controlled, which instead resulted in an immense number of clones killing the organization's cohorts. Duplicates have independent minds from the original, but are usually willing to merge back because their memories and knowledge are retained. However, there have been exceptions where duplicates have wished for independence completely, even going so far as to have malicious duplicates intending great harm to the Prime during Peter David's original and modern X-Factor runs (which featured Madrox's dupes manifesting as aspects of the main Madrox's personality rather than straightforward duplicates).

As a last-ditch effort, Madrox's abilities can be used to deadly effect, which were used in self-defense against Seamus Mellencamp, when Madrox jammed his hand into Mellencamp's mouth and activated his power, creating a duplicate inside Mellencamp and exploding him from the inside out. He has used this method to threaten people before, as well.

Madrox's duplicates can die without long term physical harm to himself, as demonstrated when the mutant Proteus possessed a duplicate then consumed its life force — leaving only a burnt out husk, as with all victims of Proteus. The possession caused Madrox to collapse in pain, aware of what was happening, but he later recovered. Another Madrox dupe died of the Legacy Virus, but Madrox himself was unaffected, although he would presumably have received the virus if he absorbed the infected dupe.

Madrox also uses merging with his duplicates as a form of healing. Uninjured dupes "share" the damage when they merged. If an injured Madrox or dupe merged with an uninjured version, the "new" version had an injury half as severe as the original injury. This method may depend upon the severity of the injury, such as when the M-tattooed dupe sent his scarring to the original.

As a consequence of splitting into multiple selves, Jamie has accumulated a vast wealth of knowledge and experience, along with some confusion over which Jamie did what. For example, although he says his duplicates have had active sex lives, he is not sure whether he himself ever has, to the point that he was once uncertain whether he or a dupe had conceived his son Sean with Siryn (with the result that his body absorbed his infant son the first time he held the boy, as his body regarded the baby as another dupe rather than an independent entity).

Thanks to duplicates who have rejoined him after learning new skills, Madrox can pick locks and speak multiple languages (including Russian and Hawaiian). He is adept in Shaolin Kung Fu, firing handguns and throwing playing-cards. One of his dupes was a S.H.I.E.L.D. agent, where he studied espionage. Madrox, or his duplicates, also participated on an Olympic gymnastics team and became a licensed attorney.

Madrox has generally been considered a mutant. Unlike most mutants, whose mutant powers emerge during adolescence, Madrox exhibited powers from the day he was born. In X-Factor, Damian Tryp declares Madrox is not a mutant, but a "killcrop" like him, so named because they were believed to cause bad harvests in olden times.

== Reception ==
- In 2014, Entertainment Weekly ranked Jamie Madrox the Multiple Man 17th in their "Let's rank every X-Man ever" list.
- In 2022, Screen Rant included Multiple Man in their "10 Most Powerful Lawyers In Comics" list.
- In 2022, Comic Book Resources ranked James Madrox 4th in their "10 Most Powerful Lawyers In Marvel Comics" list.

== Other versions ==
=== Age of Apocalypse ===
An alternate universe version of Jamie Madrox from Earth-295 appears in Age of Apocalypse. This version was captured and experimented on by Mister Sinister and the Dark Beast, who force his clones into serving them and leave the original a childlike lunatic who is held at the Church of the Madri in Quebec. After Banshee and Quicksilver attempt to rescue him, Madrox shuts down all of his duplicates and is killed in the resulting psychic backlash.

=== Earth X ===
An alternate universe version of Jamie Madrox from Earth-9997 appears in Earth X. This version was transformed into a Wendigo after cannibalizing one of his clones during a food shortage. He battles the Avengers, who eventually kill him.

=== Marvel Zombies ===
A zombified alternate universe version of Multiple Man from Earth-2149 appears in Marvel Zombies vs. The Army of Darkness #3.

=== Ultimate Marvel ===
An alternate universe version of Multiple Man (Jamie Madrox) from Earth-1610 appears in the Ultimate Marvel universe. This version is a mutant with the ability to create multiple duplicates of himself that damage his mind if overused. A strong believer in pro-mutant rights, Madrox joined the Brotherhood of Supremacy and became one of Magneto's most loyal followers. He is later captured by Lorelei and hypnotized into believing that he is a child while Magneto forms an army from his clones.

== In other media ==
=== Television ===
- Jamie Madrox / Multiple Man appears in the X-Men: The Animated Series episode "Cold Comfort" as a member of X-Factor.
  - Multiple Man makes appearances in X-Men '97.
- Jamie Madrox / Multiple appears in X-Men: Evolution, voiced by David A. Kaye. This version is a teenaged member of the X-Men's junior team, the New Mutants.
- Jamie Madrox / Multiple Man appears in the Wolverine and the X-Men episode "eXcessive Force", voiced by Crispin Freeman. This version is a member of Mister Sinister's Marauders.

=== Film ===
- Jamie Madrox / Multiple Man appears in X-Men: The Last Stand, portrayed by Eric Dane. This version is a criminal reputed to have robbed seven banks simultaneously. He joins Magneto's Brotherhood after the latter frees him from federal custody and assists them in opposing a mutant cure by distracting government forces.
- A film based on Jamie Madrox starring James Franco was in development at 20th Century Fox.

=== Video games ===
- Jamie Madrox / Multiple Man appears in X-Men: The Official Game, voiced by Eric Dane.
- Jamie Madrox / Multipleman appears in X-Men Legends, voiced by Dee Bradley Baker.
- The Madri appear in X-Men Legends II: Rise of Apocalypse. This version of the group is a cult who follow Apocalypse and are unconnected to Jamie Madrox, Mister Sinister, and Dark Beast.
- Jamie Madrox / Multiple Man appears in Marvel: Ultimate Alliance 2, voiced by Wally Wingert. In the Wii, PS2, and PSP versions, several of Madrox's duplicates serve as bosses in the Anti-Registration campaign. In the PS3, PS4, Xbox 360, Xbox One and PC versions, he appears as a boss in the Pro-Registration campaign. Across all versions, he falls under the Fold's nanite-based mind control after escaping Prison 42.
- Jamie Madrox / Multiple Man appears as an ability card in Ultimate Marvel vs. Capcom 3's "Heroes and Heralds" mode.
- Jamie Madrox / Multiple Man appears in Marvel Heroes, voiced by Rick Pasqualone.

=== Miscellaneous ===
- James Madrox appears in the novelization for X2 as a student at the Xavier Institute who is in a relationship with Siryn.
- Jamie Madrox / Multiple Man received an action figure in the X-Men sub-line of Hasbro's Marvel Legends line.

== Collected editions ==
Title	Material collected	Publication date	ISBN
Madrox: Multiple Choice	Madrox #1–5	January 2008	978-0785130314
Multiple Man: It All Makes Sense in the End	Multiple Man #1–5	December 2018	978-1302912970
