= Shatterstar =

Marvel Comics superhero

Gaveedra-Seven Shatterstar
- Shatterstar. Art by Marco Santucci.

Publication information
- Publisher: Marvel Comics
- First appearance: The New Mutants #99 (March 1991)
- Created by: Fabian Nicieza; Rob Liefeld

In-story information
- Alter ego: Gaveedra-Seven
- Species: Genetically-engineered humanoid mutant
- Team affiliations: The Cadre Alliance; X-Force; New Mutants; X-Factor Investigations; Knights of X
- Notable aliases: Benjamin Russell
- Abilities: Superhuman physical attributes and accelerated healing; Enhanced cognition; Controlling frequencies of electricity and generate bioelectric vibratory shockwaves; Creating teleportation portals through his swords

Shatterstar (Gaveedra-Seven; Earth name: Benjamin Russell) is a mutant superhero appearing in American comic books published by Marvel Comics. Created by writer Fabian Nicieza and artist Rob Liefeld, the character first appeared in The New Mutants #99 (March 1991), after which he became a member of the superhero team X-Force. He later became an employee of X-Factor Investigations, a private detective firm starring in the series X-Factor.

Shatterstar is an unusual character among Marvel's mutant superheroes in X-Men books in that, although a human mutant, he was raised in an alternate dimension known as Mojoworld with no knowledge of his origins. When he arrives on Earth he has little understanding of Earth relationships, customs, and culture. At the time of his introduction, he largely conformed to 1990s comics trends: an emotionally closed off, brutal, macho warrior. Subsequent writers, such as Jeph Loeb, later attempted to show the character's adjustment to human norms and his development of close friendships on Earth, and in particular with his teammate Rictor. An early mystery about the character concerned his similarities to the mutant hero Longshot, which was later resolved in a 2010s storyline that explained Shatterstar is the son of Longshot and Dazzler, sent a century back in time by his future self. Paradoxically, his DNA was then used to create Longshot.

Since 2007, the character has been portrayed as an outgoing queer superhero in an on-off relationship with his superhero colleague Rictor and in 2009, shared the first same-sex kiss in a mainstream Marvel Comics publication. One of his creators, Liefeld, criticized the development, having previously depicted the character as asexual. His other creator, Nicieza, stated his intention was to use Shatterstar as a blank slate to explore sexual identity. X-Factor writer Peter David introduced the romantic pairing with Rictor, building off of fan desire to see the characters together in a gay relationship. The character has since been prominently featured by Marvel as an example of LGBTQIA representation, portrayed by writers as a "swashbuckling, enthusiastic" figure, in contrast to his earlier stern and taciturn appearances.

Shatterstar, also known as Rusty, appears in Deadpool 2 (2018) and the Marvel Cinematic Universe film Deadpool & Wolverine (2024), portrayed by Lewis Tan.

== Creation ==
Liefeld spoke on the character's creation: "I went into my files and found the original source of my inspiration for SHATTERSTAR. Carl Pott's [sic] original sketch for Longshot had the white costume and the Eye Tattoo - Art Adams played with a version of this himself back in 1984. Knowing that Shatterstar was from Longshot’s reality, I fashioned this first look after the original un-used design, albeit with longer hair. This is why you listen to the experts, not wannabe revisionists."

== Publication history ==
Shatterstar first appeared in The New Mutants #99 (March 1991), and was created by Fabian Nicieza and Rob Liefeld. He also appeared on a pin-up bonus cover in The New Mutants Annual #6 (July 1990) as part of a 'Vision to Come', predating his appearance in The New Mutants #99.

Since his debut, Shatterstar has mainly appeared in the original X-Force title, with some issues devoted solely to him. In 2005, the character was featured in his own limited series, X-Force: Shatterstar. Shatterstar became a member of X-Factor in X-Factor #45 (August 2009).

Shatterstar also starred in a self-titled five-issue miniseries in 2018.

== Fictional character biography ==
Shatterstar is an artificial human from Mojo's planet Mojoworld a century in the future who was genetically engineered to serve as a gladiator. Eventually, he escaped and joined the Cadre Alliance, the rebel group that sought to overthrow Mojo's dictatorship. From there, he learned the Cadre's language and began taking part in missions.

On one of these missions, Arize sends Shatterstar back in time to Earth to find the X-Men and get their assistance in defeating and overthrowing Mojo. However, he does not find the X-Men. Shatterstar was either teleported or traveled back in time to Earth at the point just before Cable reorganized the New Mutants into X-Force. At first, he battles Cable, Domino, and the New Mutants, but after they talked with him, the group aids him against the Imperial Protectorate. With Cable's assurance that they would help him defeat Mojo (though with the use of time travel it was not urgent that they leave anytime soon), Shatterstar becomes a founding member of the new team, X-Force.

Later Shatterstar discovers, to his bewilderment, that he possesses the memories of the human Benjamin Russell. Soon afterwards, Mojo imprisons Cable and Shatterstar and transforms them into digital images for one of his television programs. In the course of the show, Shatterstar is mortally wounded in combat. Spiral teleports Cable and Shatterstar back into reality, where they regain their true forms. Spiral brings Cable, Shatterstar, Longshot, and Siryn to the Weisman Institute for the Criminally Insane in Rutland, Vermont. There, Spiral directs them to the bedside of one of its patients, a mutant named Benjamin Russell who has been in a coma since his powers had emerged and appears identical to Shatterstar. Longshot transfers Shatterstar's soul into Russell's body, causing it to take on his appearance. Restored to peak health and full consciousness and feeling "whole" for the first time in his life, Shatterstar resumes his work as a member of X-Force.

Shatterstar, as seen on the cover of X-Force: Shatterstar #1 (April 2005) Art by Rob Liefeld.

Dazzler reveals that she is pregnant with Longshot's child and Longshot suggests the name "Shatterstar" for the unborn child. Longshot and Dazzler return to Mojoworld to free Longshot's people, and Dazzler later appears without Longshot and without a child. It was speculated that Dazzler miscarried, though it was not established until a 2013 comic by Peter David what became of the infant. The child's future self, Shatterstar, wiped his parents' memories of his birth and arranged for him to be transported to the future.

Shatterstar is later seen in Madripoor, earning his money by fighting in arenas. He is sought out by Spiral, who has one of her agents make Shatterstar believe she wants to kill him. However, Spiral had previously admitted, in an emotional confession to Cable, when he demanded that she reveal all that she knew about the answers behind the mysteries of Shatterstar's origin immediately after Shatterstar and Benjamin Russell had been merged, that both young men "meant more than life itself to her" before teleporting away. With a fake quest, Spiral lures Shatterstar to an alternate universe that she had conquered, killing its version of Shatterstar and many other heroes. Upon returning to the mainstream Earth, Shatterstar is contacted by Cable and requested to join him on a mission to defeat the Skornn. Shatterstar agrees, but Cable wants him to train with the monks on Mount Xixabangma first. After the monks are killed by Skornn's worshipers, Shatterstar is reunited with his old team, who eventually kill the Skornn.

Following M-Day and the passing of the Superhuman Registration Act, Shatterstar works with Domino and Caliban to break The 198 out of the encampment set up for mutants on the grounds of the Xavier Institute. They take the escapees to a secret base provided to them by Captain America via Nick Fury. While fighting forces of the Office of National Emergency, Shatterstar nearly kills Micromax, claiming that while there is no such thing as murder during war, he had only meant to disable him.

=== X-Factor ===
In a 2009 X-Factor story, Shatterstar, whose mind is being controlled by the villain Cortex, attacks Strong Guy and Rictor. Shatterstar is broken out of his trance-like state when Cortex's control over him is interrupted. Upon recognizing Rictor, he kisses him passionately. Journeying to Detroit, Cortex confronts Longshot and the two fight. As Cortex attempts to gain control over Longshot, he is startled that Longshot, like Shatterstar, is extradimensional (limiting his degree of control) and that the two men are somehow related.

Rictor and Shatterstar's relationship experiences conflict because Shatterstar—who now feels romantic and sexual potential within him for the first time—wishes to explore this whole new aspect of his life, desiring an open relationship. Rictor, more fully committed to maintaining theirs as a monogamous relationship, feels hurt by Shatterstar's need for sexual exploration. Things are complicated further when Wolfsbane walks in on them during an intimate moment, which leads to a brief fight between Shatterstar and Wolfsbane. Rictor stays to take care of a pregnant Wolfsbane, who attempts to mislead him into thinking the baby is his, while Shatterstar goes off on a mission for X-Factor. On mission, he encounters the child's real father, Hrimhari, which he is able to report back to Rictor.

During the "Hell on Earth War" storyline, Shatterstar and Rictor are blasted by the god of Hell, Mephisto, and appear to die, but are in fact sent into Mojoworld's relative past—to the era of Shatterstar's arrival in Mojoworld, as shown in the final X-Factor story arc, "The End of X-Factor". Rictor and the audience learn that Shatterstar is the only Mojoworld rebel who was not created by Arize the Creator, as he mysteriously appeared from the sky one day. Arize then used Shatterstar's genetic material to create Longshot, making Shatterstar Longshot's genetic father. Mojo later attacks Arize's sanctuary, leading Shatterstar to time-teleport him and Rictor. They arrive later in Mojoworld's history, when Dazzler and Longshot are married and fighting a war against Mojo. Dazzler goes into labor, and gives birth to a young Shatterstar, who Shatterstar explains to Rictor he will deliver to the future of Mojoworld to be raised by the people that raised him, but not before he erases Dazzler and Longshot's memories of their having a child.

=== New Tian ===
During "Secret Empire", it is revealed that Shatterstar and Rictor returned to the present. He is part of the New Tian residents, along with Rictor and many other mutants. After New Tian is dismantled, Rictor tells Iceman that he and Shatterstar are now on a break.

=== Landlord of Manor Crossing ===
Feeling unsure about himself and his relationship with Rictor, Shatterstar ends things between them. Newly single, Shatterstar buys a property using the earnings he had made and names it Manor Crossing. He offers the rooms to multi-dimensional refugees like himself and serves as both landlord and protector to his tenants. When Shatterstar's tenants are kidnapped by the Mojoworld mercenary group the Death Sponsors and their leader, former ally Gringrave, Shatterstar vows to bring them home.

With help from Rictor, Shatterstar follows the group to the world of Horus IV, which is ruled by the Grandmaster. Grandmaster tasks Gringrave with the kidnapping, hoping to use a gladiatorial battle between the enemies to satisfy the Horuvians' lust for bloody conflict.

After Shatterstar kills Gringrave in revenge for her actions, Grandmaster enters the arena, seeking to gain control of Shatterstar. Shatterstar refuses to concede and defeats Grandmaster by teleporting them to Earth-1218, a world where super-powered beings do not exist and Grandmaster's powers would not work. Shatterstar is rescued by Rictor, who had reached out across the universe to find him and bring him home.

=== eXtermination ===
Shatterstar is shocked when his former mentor Cable is killed while attempting to protect the time-displaced Iceman. When it is revealed that a younger version of Cable was responsible, Shatterstar works with his former X-Force teammates to hunt down Kid Cable and have him answer for his crime. During the search, Shatterstar is turned into one of Ahab's mutant-hunting hounds and attempts to kill the time-displaced Jean Grey. Shatterstar is subdued by Cannonball and freed of Ahab's influence.

=== Krakoa ===
Shatterstar is of the many mutants who join the mutant nation of Krakoa upon its creation. He is seen alongside many other Krakoans grieving Charles Xavier's death at the hands of anti-mutant super-human criminals who had infiltrated Krakoa.

At some point, Shatterstar returns to Mojoworld, becoming the dimension's most subscribed and top-ranked live-streamer. However, Shatterstar begins to feel trapped by the celebrity status he had created for himself. When fellow live-streamer Wind Dancer arranges for her own death to satisfy her fans, Shatterstar secretly informs the Krakoan X-Factor team of her death so they can retrieve her body before Arize can clone her and force her to resume her stream. X-Factor is successful in their mission, but are forced to leave Shatterstar behind. They promise to return and rescue him. The team eventually returns to Mojoworld alongside the New Mutants, freeing Shatterstar and arranging the freedom of all mutants there.

Shatterstar is rewarded with memories of his past, which lead to him seeking Rictor out during the Hellfire Gala. They sit on the coastline of the newly created Braddock Isle and catch up with one another. The two seemingly get back together after this and investigate a brewing war between Merlyn and King Arthur against mutantkind.

After Merlyn overthrows Saturnyne, takes control of Otherworld, and chases out most of its mutant population, Excalibur decides to have Mordred resurrected on Krakoa using Otherworldly water in place of the standard genetic material because he was prophesied to defeat King Arthur. The Otherworldly magic involved creates an atypical resurrection, as Mordred immediately disappears and is transported to Otherworld. Rictor and Shatterstar are among the eight mutants Roma brings back to Otherworld. Mordred presents himself to the team and asks for asylum. Roma Regina gives all those present a magical vision, declaring them the Knights of X and sending them to find the Siege Perilous.

Shatterstar's first mission with this new team is to Blightspoke, a poisoned land where the remnants of collapsed realities are buried. The team discovers Blightspoke's only resident, Gia Whitechapel, and her crew imprisoned in a factory that produces Brightswill, a power-dampening substance. The team destroy the factory with Gia's help, then head toward Savalith, an ancient civilization founded by vampire-like beings. After regrouping to save Mad Jim Jaspers, Gambit sacrifices himself to give the team access to Mercator, an Otherworld domain created by Mister M using the Siege Perilous. There, they sink into the quicksand and are psychologically tested by the land until Rachel Summers frees them.

== Powers and abilities ==
Shatterstar possesses an overall superhuman level of physical and mental attributes (senses, strength, speed, reflexes, agility, flexibility, stamina, and intelligence), as a result of the extra-dimensional genetic engineering that created him. Shatterstar's strength allows him to wield a heavy barbell as easy as a bō (staff) and slam the Thing of the Fantastic Four through a window of the Baxter Building. Shatterstar's speed and agility are enhanced to the point that members of the Mutant Response Division expect him to be capable of dodging point-blank automatic weapons firing from at least three trained agents.

He is an excellent military strategist and has had extensive training in many forms of martial arts and interpersonal combat of Mojoworld; in particular, he is a master swordsman. His bones are hollow, making him far lighter than he looks and further increasing his athletic and acrobatic skills. He also has enhanced learning capabilities, being able to quickly learn and master languages and technology. He customarily wields two single-edged swords with spiked hand-guards and on occasion carries other weaponry as well. Shatterstar is able to regenerate damaged or destroyed tissue much faster than an ordinary human. Injuries such as slashes and stabbings heal completely within a matter of hours. Additionally, he possesses the ability to shift his internal organs within his body, lessening the chances of serious wounds that get through his body armor.

He also has the mutant ability to control frequencies of electricity, which he can use to generate bioelectric vibratory shockwaves, and can even channel bioelectric charges through his metallic blade weaponry; he rarely uses this power as it tends to exhaust him, but once used it as a surprise attack/secret technique to apparently kill Reaper.

After Shatterstar returned from the Mojoverse, he demonstrated the ability to open an X-shaped portal capable of teleporting individuals to their desired locations. This ability requires another individual to serve as the "focus", picturing the destination. Creating such portals generates enough energy that it must be done outside, otherwise risking significant damage to any structure within which they are built. Shatterstar also requires a minimum of three to four hours to recharge between portal creation and since it requires his own energies. This ability is not actually artificial but merely another aspect of his ability to channel his energies through his swords. Should his concentration be interrupted while an individual or object is partway through, those parts will be severed, ending up in the separate locations, the destination and the starting point of the portal. The Shatterstar miniseries clarifies that his bioelectric powers are only the means to his teleportation capabilities and teleportation is actually his primary mutation. It was shown that he is able to use his hands to open portals, and does not need either his swords nor an actual other person as anchor if he wants to open a portal to where he already has been, and he is able to traverse dimensions as well as interstellar distances.

== Reception ==
- In 2013, ComicsAlliance ranked Shatterstar as #29 on their list of the "50 Sexiest Male Characters in Comics".
- In 2014, Entertainment Weekly ranked Shatterstar 24th in their "Let's rank every X-Man ever" list.
- In 2018, CBR.com ranked Shatterstar 14th in their "X-Force: 20 Powerful Members" list.

== Sexual orientation ==
Rictor and Shatterstar kiss. From X-Factor (vol. 3) #45. Art by Marco Santucci.

Although Shatterstar was revealed to have a designated "genetic bond mate", Windsong (whom he never met and is now deceased), in the Mojoverse, he later claimed that even though he was fully capable physically, he had never felt any romantic love—indicating a form of asexuality—and has long felt "lacking", even in his native dimension.

This has since been retconned to be a lie on Shatterstar's part, as it is revealed in his revised origin in his 2018 mini-series that he already had a sexual/romantic relationship with his gladiatorial mentor/partner Gringrave, which ended when she betrayed him by tricking him into becoming a murderer, causing him to rebel against Mojo V.

Since then his emotional state has been fluctuating. While in X-Force, he displayed emotion, having developed a close—and somewhat ambiguous—friendship with Rictor. X-Force writer Jeph Loeb hinted that Shatterstar had romantic feelings for Rictor and was planning on making the two a couple, but he left the title before he could make this happen.

Writer Peter David reflects that being the subject of "prolonged exposure to Earth" and around Rictor changed things for the warrior, and he began to develop a real romantic capacity. In X-Factor (vol. 3) #45 (August 2009), Shatterstar and Rictor kiss, marking the first on-panel male-male kiss between two mainstream male superheroes in mainstream Marvel comic book history. X-Factor editor Jody Leheup knew that the kiss would make "a cool moment for the fans" but stated it had not occurred to him that it would be such an important scene to gay and straight comic fans. He also remarked on the need to not over-hype the scene as he and David "really want[ed] things like this to be seen as normal." Shortly after the issue was published, David confirmed Rictor and Shatterstar's relationship on his blog and expressed his desire to explore it further.

Shatterstar's co-creator, Rob Liefeld expressed disapproval with Shatterstar not being asexual, saying that Shatterstar was meant to be "asexual, and struggling to understand human behavior." Fabian Nicieza stated, "In my final issue, I pretty clearly stated that Shatterstar had no real understanding of sexuality – homo or hetero – and needed to learn about general human nature before he could define his own sexual identity." He added that "I had planned to make Shatterstar think he was in love with Rictor, but only because he simply didn't know any better about what love was. He would have figured, this is my best friend, I care about him, he cares about me, we spend time together, fight together, laugh together – I guess I must be in love with him." Marvel editor-in-chief Joe Quesada defended the development, and stated that if Liefeld wanted it changed, he would have to "take it up with the next editor-in-chief". Peter David also defended the storyline, citing the work of other writers after Liefeld's tenure on the character, who hinted at the attraction between the two characters. David explained in an interview that he took inspiration from Torchwood character Jack Harkness, whom David describes as "swashbuckling, enthusiastic and sexually curious about anything with a pulse." As such, David's X-Factor sees Shatterstar want to have a sexually open relationship on account of having been (as in Liefeld's stories) sexually and romantically closed off to the world all his life. In the letter column to issue 232, a fan criticized David for conflating bisexuality with polyamory, to which David responded that Shatterstar is both bisexual and polyamorous.

== Other versions ==
- Shatterstarfire, a fusion of Shatterstar and DC Comics character Starfire, appears in the Amalgam Comics universe.
- An alternate timeline variant of Shatterstar who became the tyrannical leader of Mojoworld appears in X-Force Annual #1.

== In other media ==
=== Film ===
- Shatterstar appears in Deadpool 2, portrayed by Lewis Tan. This version is Rusty, a humanoid alien from Mojoworld and a member of X-Force.
- Shatterstar appears in Deadpool & Wolverine, portrayed again by Lewis Tan.

=== Video games ===
- Shatterstar appears as an unlockable playable character in Marvel: Avengers Alliance.
- Shatterstar appears as an unlockable playable character in Marvel Strike Force.
- Shatterstar appears as a playable character in Marvel Contest of Champions.
