= Mister M (character) =

- Image from X-Men 198 #5; Art by Jim Muniz

Publication information
- Publisher: Marvel Comics
- First appearance: District X #2 (2004)
- Created by: David Hine; David Yardin

In-story information
- Alter ego: Absolon Zebardyn Mercator
- Species: Human mutant
- Team affiliations: The 198
- Abilities: Molecular manipulation

Mister M (Absolon Zebardyn Mercator) is a fictional character appearing in American comic books published by Marvel Comics. The character was created by David Hine and David Yardin, and debuted in District X #2. Mister M wears a black suit and hat, and has the ability to manipulate molecules.

== Fictional character biography ==
Not much is known about the enigmatic man called Mr. M. He grew up in a small village near Ghent, Belgium. After his powers manifested, he left for the United States, and after much wandering, settled in Mutant Town.

After the events of M-Day, Mr. M is one of the few mutants to retain their powers. He heads to the Xavier Institute, which has become a refuge for the remaining mutants. When Mr. M arrives at the institute, he passes through the walls surrounding the school and is attacked by Sentinels, but effortlessly repels them. The X-Men are very leery about the intentions of Mr. M, who may be an omega-level mutant.

Mr. M disables the 198's tracking chips after learning that they are actually intended to generate disabling electronic pulses, then states his intent to leave for a new sanctuary. However, he is apparently killed when Johnny Dee manipulates Leech into removing his powers, then having Magma attack him.

When Krakoa is established as a mutant nation, Absolon Mercator is among the few mutants who choose not to live there. The Krakoans finally learn of Absolon's whereabouts during the X of Swords tournament. After taking control of Avalon, Apocalypse gives Absolon a part of the realm to shape as he pleases and the Siege Perilous to watch over.

== Powers and abilities ==
Similar to Molecule Man, Mister M has complete control over the atomic structure of molecules. He can transmute all matter and energy on a subatomic level. His powers have been described as virtually omnipotent.
