= District X =

Fictional comic book location

District X (Mutant Town)
- District X, as depicted in New X-Men #127.
- First appearance: New X-Men #127 (August, 2002)
- Created by: Grant Morrison; John Paul Leon

In-universe information
- Type: Neighborhood
- Race: Mutants
- Locations: Alphabet City, Manhattan
- Publisher: Marvel Comics

District X, also known as Mutant Town or the Middle East Side, is a fictional location that appears in American comic books published by Marvel Comics. It is described as a neighborhood based in New York City primarily populated by mutants, first seen during Grant Morrison's run on the series New X-Men in New X-Men #127. The neighborhood was established in Alphabet City, Manhattan (also known as Loisaida), a neighborhood in the East Village (located between Avenues A to D, and between Houston and 14th Streets). This would fall within New York's 12th congressional district and the New York City Council's 2nd district. According to the front cover of X-Factor #31, it had a population of 743, having been much reduced by the Decimation.

District X also refers to a comic book series about the neighborhood and its inhabitants. Written by David Hine, the series was a police procedural, starring Bishop and Ismael Ortega, who investigated crimes committed by and against the ghetto's mutant residents. The series also explored Ortega's complicated personal relationships and gradual descent into drug abuse and adultery. It ran as District X for 14 monthly issues beginning in May 2004, then as Mutopia X as part of the crossover House of M event for five monthly issues beginning in July 2005.

== District X (fictional location) ==
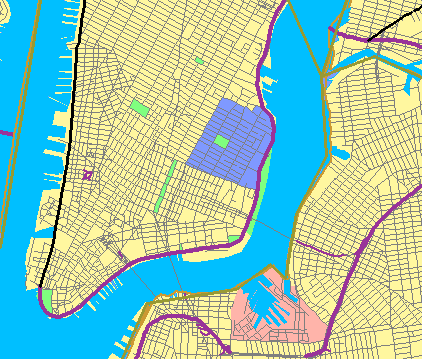
A map of Alphabet City, identified as the location of Mutant Town in New X-Men #127

The rise in Manhattan's mutant population, coupled with racism among normal humans, leads to mutants forming their own community on Manhattan's Lower East Side (described as the fictional 'Middle East Side' in Peter David's X-Factor). Although humans live in this neighborhood, they form a minority. NYX establishes that District X is an official title for the region.

The neighborhood is depicted as poor, overcrowded and violent, with a high crime rate and warring mutant gangs. Most of the residents regard it as a ghetto. It is described in District X as having the "highest unemployment rate in the USA, the highest rate of illiteracy and the highest severe overcrowding outside of Los Angeles," even though New York City as a whole has seen a decrease in violent crime. It also has the highest crime rates in the country for narcotics, prostitution, and burglary. Many of the characters featured have mutations more akin to curses than gifts, further exacerbating the neighborhood's poverty and disadvantage. It also has a large underground population, inhabiting tunnels beneath the neighborhood and living in homeless squalor. Many residents are immigrants, such as Bosnian immigrant Dzemal. In X-Men Unlimited #2, Bishop notes that "there are mutants in District X from every nation on Earth. Every race, religion and culture." Margaret O'Connell, writing for Sequential Tart, describes District X as "the mutant ghetto of the Marvel Universe version of New York City", and as "a slum where minor-league mutants from all over the globe – often more visibly handicapped or disfigured by their genetic abnormalities than the relatively glamorous and outwardly normal X-Men – have congregated in a disaffected and varyingly dysfunctional clump."

Stories set in District X feature a range of mutant-owned businesses, clubs and restaurants, as well as mutant subculture. Bands such as 'Sentinel Bait' and 'Juggernauts' are mentioned as parts of this subculture, while mutant fashion designers like Jumbo Carnation and nightclubs such as Daniel's Inferno create a mutant-oriented nightlife. In this respect, District X may be considered a Marvel Universe analogue to Harlem, the Meatpacking District, or Little Italy, as a cultural center, 'ethnic' enclave and population hub for a disenfranchised minority.

Grant Morrison's creation of an analogy to an ethnic ghetto has been praised, with J. Caleb Mozzocco noting that "if the mutants were always being likened to oppressed ethnic groups and minorities, then why not treat them like a real ethnic group, complete with mutant language, styles, culture and a 'Mutant Town' in New York City?" David Brothers, writing for 4thletter!, notes that:

Morrison turned mutants into a subculture, a logical extension of what happens when new elements are introduced into society. They were still oppressed, but they actually had some kind of culture to go along with their oppression. He gave them their own Chinatown, their own Little Italy, and made it a point to show that mutants, while not entirely accepted just yet, were more than just mutant paramilitary teams.

During the House of M storyline, the district is transformed into a rich, exclusively mutant neighborhood named Mutopia X (during the same storyline, Hell's Kitchen is transformed into a human ghetto called Sapien Town). After this story, the residents suffer the 'Decimation', with most of them stripped of their mutant abilities. Many remaining mutants are moved to a relocation camp on the grounds of the Xavier Institute.

Some former mutants remain in District X, with many — like Quicksilver and Rictor – suffering from depression and alienation. After the Decimation, the district becomes known as the (fictional) 'Middle East Side', losing many of its distinctive characteristics. The area becomes increasingly depopulated as former mutants seek to live normal lives. In X-Factor, anti-mutant riots grip the district after the Decimation, with agents of the human supremacist group Purity roaming the area in X-Men: The 198.

In Peter David's X-Factor (vol. 3), the former ghetto is the base of operations for X-Factor Investigations, who frequently deal with the aftermath of the Decimation and its effects on the local community. In the Civil War storyline, Jamie Madrox and his team declare 'Mutant Town' a sanctuary for superheroes being pursued by the government. This brings them into conflict with the regular X-Men team, who eventually allow them to have their way.

The former 'Mutant Town' is later besieged by X-Cell, a terrorist group composed of former mutants who blamed the United States government for the loss of their powers. After the events of X-Men: Messiah Complex, the neighborhood is briefly taken over by Arcade, working for an ex-Purifier, Taylor.

Mutant Town is completely destroyed in X-Factor #31, 'The Middle East Side is Burning', as a 'back-up' plan by Arcade following his defeat. A series of explosions incinerate much of the neighborhood, with Arcade's force fields preventing fire fighters from entering the area until the entire district is utterly annihilated. In X-Factor #32, Valerie Cooper announces that the ruins will be demolished and replaced with suburban housing, and that "in a few decades, no one will even know that this used to be called Mutant Town".

== District X (2004–2005 series) ==
District X/Mutopia X
- Cover to District X (vol. 1) collection, featuring Bishop and Ismael. Art by Steve McNiven.

Publication information
- Publisher: Marvel Comics
- Schedule: Monthly
- Format: Ongoing series
- Genre: Spy, superhero
- Publication date: July 2004 – August 2005
- No. of issues: 19
- Main character(s): Bishop; Ismael Ortega; Mister M The Porcupine

Creative team
- Written by: David Hine
- Artist(s): David Yardin; Lan Medina
- Inker: Alejandro "Boy" Sicat

Collected editions
- Mr M: ISBN 0-7851-1444-0

District X is a comic book series published by Marvel Comics. The police procedural is set in 'Mutant Town'.

The series stars the X-Man and FBI agent Lucas Bishop, assigned to the ghetto to investigate rising crime rates among the population in New York's (fictional) '11th Precinct' in Alphabet City. Bishop works with NYPD patrolman Ismael Ortega, an ordinary human married to a mutant (Armena Ortega). A major subplot concerned Ismael's relationship with his family, with the stresses of his job adversely affecting his home life.

=== Publication history ===
The series was part of the Marvel Knights imprint. It started in X-Men Unlimited v2 #2 and then ran for fourteen issues from July 2004 to August 2005. It briefly changed title to Mutopia X for five issues, between September 2005 and January 2006, before its cancellation.

The series was written by British writer David Hine, who previously worked on the Mambo series for 2000 AD.

It was originally drawn by Australian artist David Yardin, followed by Filipino artist Lan Medina. The series was mostly inked by Filipino artist Alejandro "Boy" Sicat. All artists involved worked with Brian Haberlin's Avalon Studios during the series' publication.

During the House of M crossover, the series was replaced by the miniseries Mutopia X. Hine continued some of the series' plot points in X-Men: The 198 miniseries.

=== Plot ===
==== Mr. M (#1–6) ====
Officers Gus Kucharsky and Ismael Ortega are assigned to New York's 11th Precinct, commonly known as District X or 'Mutant Town'. While investigating allegations that Jake Costanza is holding his mutant wife against her will and abusing her, Kucharsky falls under Mrs. Costanza's mutant mental powers and kills them both, before attempting to take his own life. Gus survives and Ortega covers for him. Gus is forced to retire early and Izzy is assigned to serve as the liaison to federal agent, Lucas Bishop.

Violence erupts between rival crime lords "Shaky" Kaufman and "Filthy Frankie" Zapruder over a mutant, Toad Boy, and the addictive narcotic he produces (known as 'Toad Juice'). When Kaufman learns of the lucrative sales of 'Toad Juice' in District X, he raids Zapruder's facilities and kidnaps the Toad Boy for himself. However, it is unknown that Toad Juice can be fatal to normal humans; a theft of the drug leads to the death of over a dozen human teenagers.

After the death of a human patron at the nightclub Daniel's Inferno caused by exposure to Toad Juice, the police begin a desperate investigation before other unsuspecting addicts face the same fate. This prompts a turf war between Zapruder and Kaufman. Both men are eventually arrested.

When Absolom Mercator finally decides to use his powers to try to help others, his efforts backfire and he suffers an intense identity crisis. Believing that he must use his powers to destroy Mutant Town, Mercator warns his friend, Hanna Levy so that she can escape safely. The police intervene and use Lara the Illusionist to show Mr. M the devastation he could unleash. This snaps the mutant back to his senses and he willingly returns to his peaceful life of quiet isolation after a short period in jail.

==== Underworld (#7–12) ====
A series of brutal murders followed by a mysterious blackout leads to an investigation of the growing underground mutant community, called the Tunnel Rats. Calling themselves "Those Who Live in Darkness", the tunnelers claim responsibility for the blackout and state that they want the city to leave them alone. In recent months, police and social services have put pressure on the Tunnel Rats by destroying their homes and remanding their children into state custody.

Tensions with the Tunnel Rats come to a head just as Bishop and Officer Ortega track down the Worm, a hideously mutated young man who is seeking revenge for being cast out by his parents. Bishop convinces many of the Tunnel Rats to rejoin surface society but a small band decides to dwell deeper in the tunnels under Mutant Town. Their journey is cut short by the Worm who massacres them all before being stopped by Bishop and Ortega, who kills him.

==== One of Us (#13–14) ====
William "Billy" Bates discovers that he is a mutant, calling himself "The Porcupine", and becomes a frequent patron at the Café Des Artistes. He falls in love with the Café's waitress, Sylvie Lauziere. When a group of anti-mutant humans start harassing her, Billy steps in and inadvertently kills several humans with his emerging powers. He barricades himself in the Café with Sylvie, which the authorities perceive as a hostage situation. In order to hide the fact that a mutant slaughtered several members of Purity, an anti-mutant movement, Alexei Vazhin orders hitwoman Sashenka Popova to kill the boy, and pays hush money to the Lauzieres to cover up the truth of the incident.

==== Mutopia X (#1–5) ====
The Scarlet Witch transforms the entire world into a mutant paradise ruled by her father Magneto. This shift in reality turns District X into "Mutopia X", the center of art and culture in the new mutant-dominated world. The denizens of District X find themselves in a newly elevated societal status. Lara the Illusionist is a movie star married to entertainment mogul, Daniel "Shaky" Kaufman. Absolon Mercator and Gregor Smerdyakov have founded the Center for Transformation and Illumination and are the center of a spiritual following as they help mutants achieve their genetic potential. Ishmael Ortega is tasked with protecting Mercator from assassination.

After the Decimation, Ishmael Ortega's daughter dies. He attempts suicide, before reuniting with his family.

=== Characters ===
District X's large ensemble cast included:

- A "mysterious stranger" called Mr. M (also the title of the first story-arc), who attempted to destroy District X out of sheer world-weariness but was stopped by Bishop and Ortega.
- Two rival crime lords, "Filthy" Frankie Zapruder and Daniel "Shaky" Kaufman.
- Gregor Smerdyakov, a mutant who puts down roots whenever he falls asleep.
- Winston Hobbes, a large worm-like mutant who inhabits the District X sewer system.
- Lara the Illusionist, a high-paid call-girl whose customers include 'a former President of the United States', capable of creating highly realistic illusions and fantasies.
- Armena Ortega, wife of Ismael Ortega who generates a protective bubble when she sleeps.

The district also possessed a large population of mutants whose mutations or personalities made them unsuitable for the flashier or more dangerous "super" life. These include:

- A woman who can burst into flames but is not immune to being burnt.
- Jazz (John Zander), a man whose sole power is that his skin is bright blue.
- A woman who could control men with the sound of her voice (her husband kept her bound and gagged in their apartment because of this).
- A boy who has large skin flaps under his arms.

=== Collected editions ===
The series, both written by David Hine, was collected into two trade paperbacks:

- Mr. M (collects District X #1–6, with pencils by David Yardin, Lan Medina and Mike Perkins, and inks by Alejandro Sicat, Avalon Studios and Drew Hennessy, 144 pages, January 2005, ISBN 0-7851-1444-0)
- Underground (collects District X #7–14 and the prologue from X-Men Unlimited #2, with art by Adi Granov, pencils by Lan Medina, and inks by Alejandro Sicat, 200 pages, October 2005, ISBN 0-7851-1602-8)

Mutopia X was collected into the trade paperback House of M: Mutopia X (ISBN 978-0785118114) and as part of the hardcover collection House of M, Vol 4: No More Mutants (ISBN 978-0785138839).

== Reception ==
Academic Martin Lund, in the Journal of Urban Cultural Studies, stated that while District X was introduced during Morrison's run as part of the mutant subculture, it wasn't his main focus. It did reappear in subsequent series such as writer Joe Quesada's NYX (November 2003–October 2005) with artists Joshua Middleton (#1–4) and Robert Teranishi (#5–7), however, NYX displayed continuity and geography errors such as District X appearing further south than "Morrison's Alphabet City and, strangely, given Quesada's above-quoted emphasis on 'keeping the real world real', the Lower East Side's Essex Street was placed within the boundaries of Alphabet City. Thus, although 'Mutant Town' did make a few appearances between its creation and District X, it was not until Hine, Yardin and Medina's series that the place became an area of sustained focus". Lund highlighted the real world echoes and caricatures displayed in their portrayal of District X, such as the drug trade and homelessness, and that contemporary Alphabet City "was a contested space" – "the problem bubbling in the modern unconscious, that surfaces in District X, is that these urban Others simply will not go away".

Ryan Bradley, for CBR in 2020, also highlighted the development of the mutant subculture in Hine, Yardin and Medina's series where "the mutants living in District X developed their own slang, music, and drugs" and that the neighborhood "was populated by the kind of mutants that weren't candidates to be X-Men: individuals whose mutations made them recognizably mutant, but didn't have powers to defend themselves. It was a sad reality, as they were attacked by anti-mutant humans often". Bradley commented that during the Decimation storyline, District X initially was a "haven for mutants who were depowered but still had vestigial physical differences and those who retained their powers under the protection of Jamie Madrox's X-Factor Investigations", however, the neighborhood's destruction in X-Factor #32 "was a somber ending for a sad setting". Ashley Fields, for Screen Rant in 2023, commented that District X was "unique" among the various attempts at creating a mutant area, such as Genosha, Utopia, and Krakoa, within Marvel Comics since the idea was "that it was separated, yet still stuck with the constraints of human society. [...] While the area was known as Mutant Town, it had every quality of mutants trying to live and grow in the middle of a world where they were still seen as freaks – though that didn't stop the place from existing. There were no major heroic figures to swoop in and save District X". Fields highlighted that even the House of M inversion of the "neighborhood was still defined by its proximity to humans".

=== Critical reception of the series ===
In his review of issue #3, Paul O'Brien described the series as "one of the best things to come out of Reload". In his review of 2004, O'Brien noted that "[District X has] not been a complete creative success, but at least it's been trying." However, O'Brien was less favourable to later issues of the series; in his review of District X in 2005, he noted that "ultimately, District X feels like a case of potential never quite realised – and not just because it got cut off by a change in the direction of the line".

Comic Book Galaxy noted, with reference to the Mr. M arc (issues #1–6), that "the potential for an excellent book is evident". Comics Bulletin were highly favourable to the series, stating that "[i]t is a rare comic book that is able to breathe new life into a stale genre, and yet that is precisely what District X has managed to do... District X is more than just a traditional superhero comic, establishing itself as an entertaining blend of action, crime noir and social commentary".

Writing for Sequential Tart, Margaret O'Connell praised the series as an "absorbing, well-crafted tale which effectively combines both crime and science fictional elements", comparing the series to George R. R. Martin's Wild Cards series, NYPD Blue, and DC Comics' Gotham Central.

Lund believed that the series did not ask readers "to inhabit the world of the dispossessed" but instead readers "are invited on a ride-along, a voyeuristic tour of the slum that once was and might be again, unless the wheels of progress and urban renewal keep turning. Thus, District X condenses, mediates and puts a selection of urban problems on display – crime, drugs, homelessness, increased overcrowding and self-destructive desperation – and proceeds to show how official discipline provides their solution, telling readers that police intervention has the power to get rid of them". Lund commented that the series "tells readers that force in favour of clearing out radical difference in the neighbourhood and making it into a space fit for 'normal' people is natural, rational and logical and in the best interest even of those who might be displaced by gentrification, disproportionately incarcerated in the name of 'law and order', or put at risk of their lives in dangerous shelters. And in doing so, rather than 'keeping the real world real', the series lines up with so many neighbourhood representations of the past century and presents for a new readership the middle-class gentrifier's myth of what Alphabet City could and should be".

== In other media ==
=== Video games ===
- Mutant Town appears in Marvel Heroes. It gets founded after there is an increase of the mutant population in New York City, and the mutants feel a need for a place of their own. However, the city is under almost constant attack of the Purifiers who want to kill all its inhabitants.
- District X appears in the digital collectible card game Marvel Snap.

== See also ==
- Asteroid M
- Genosha
