= Ruby Summers =

- Ruby Summers; Art by Valentine De Landro

Publication information
- Publisher: Marvel Comics
- First appearance: X-Factor: Layla Miller #1 (Aug. 2008)
- Created by: Peter David; Valentine De Landro

In-story information
- Alter ego: Ruby Summers
- Species: Human Mutant
- Team affiliations: Summers Rebellion
- Abilities: Optic force beams Capable of shapeshifting into a ruby form

Ruby Summers is a fictional character appearing in American comic books published by Marvel Comics. The character first appeared in the one-shot X-Factor: Layla Miller.

== Fictional character biography ==
Ruby is the daughter of Scott Summers and Emma Frost from the dystopian alternate future Earth-1191. She has been living in the ruins of Atlantic City with Scott for decades. When Layla Miller and a man named Dwayne show up one day looking for the now-aged Cyclops, Ruby attacks them. After finding out who Layla Miller is, she brings her to her father, who has been waiting to see Layla for decades. After a conversation with Cyclops, Layla convinces Ruby to meet up with a new mutant named Linqon. Together, they start the Summers Rebellion.

Years after the start of the rebellion, Ruby rescues the now-aged Layla and Jamie Madrox, whom Layla had brought into the future from the past, from a Sentinel attack. She is not pleased to find out Layla disobeyed her in bringing Madrox to the future. Ruby, Scott, and Layla begin questioning Doctor Doom about time travel when they are attacked by Sentinels again. This time, they are saved by Trevor Fitzroy.

Ruby is seen next when an aged Doctor Doom brings Cortex, a clone of Jamie Madrox, to her time and forces him to attack mutants. Although initially at a disadvantage, as Doom has taken control of Cyclops due to his cyborg nature, Ruby manages to defeat Doom, Cortex, and Cyclops. Doom escapes and Ruby swears to kill him.

While Madrox battles Cortex, Ruby asks Layla to revive Fitzroy, who was killed during Cortex's initial assault. Although Layla does not think that it is a good idea, she complies since Ruby persuades her that they may take control of their own destiny.

=== Future Imperfect ===
An alternate version of Ruby Summers appears in the Future Imperfect limited series, a tie-in to Marvel's Secret Wars event. She is a member of the resistance against Maestro's regime.

== Powers and abilities ==
Ruby has the power to emit force beams from her eyes, like her father Cyclops, but hers are black and take 93 seconds to regenerate. She also has the ability to transform her body into organic ruby similar to the diamond form of her mother Emma Frost. This ruby form halts Ruby's aging process and allows her to survive without sustenance, but due to fear that she might "age nearly seventy years in seconds" if she reverts, she has remained in this form for decades.

== Reception ==
- In 2018, CBR.com ranked Ruby Summers as one of the worst X-Men progeny in "8 X-Men Kids Cooler Than Their Parents (And 7 Who Are Way Worse)" list.
