= List of Xavier Institute students and staff =

The Xavier Institute was one of the fictional schools situated at X-Mansion in the Marvel Universe, published in American comic books by Marvel Comics.

The school was originally opened as Xavier's School for Gifted Youngsters by Professor Xavier and served as the home of the X-Men and New Mutants. Students lived under pretense that they were students of Professor X to keep their mutant nature a secret from the outside world. The school was eventually renamed as Xavier Institute for Higher Learning. At one point of its history, Massachusetts Academy was reopened by Banshee and White Queen but as the branch of Xavier Institute to train Generation X. When the secrecy of mutant school became public, its student body and staff expanded tremendously. Most of these students were assigned into squads with an advisor, when Cyclops and White Queen took over Xavier Institute. After the events of M-Day, squads were disbanded and later the school was closed.

White Queen with the remaining Xavier Institute students after M-Day in New X-Men, vol. 2 #23, as drawn by Mark Brooks

The school was reopened as Jean Grey School for Higher Learning under the leadership of Wolverine and Shadowcat. Jean Grey School also received transferred students from New Charles Xavier School for Mutants after it was closed. (Note: New Charles Xavier School for New Mutants was opened by Cyclops, which remained unsanctioned by X-Men and the government.: These were the staff members: Cyclops, Dazzler, Shadowcat, Lockheed, Magik, Magneto and White Queen.; These were the students: Hijack, Goldballs, Laura Kinney, Morph, Stepford Cuckoos (Celeste, Mindee and Phoebe), time-displaced X-Men (Angel, Beast, Cyclops, Iceman and Jean Grey), Tempus and Triage) The school was briefly relocated to Limbo for the protection from Terrigen Mist, which was toxic to mutants. Later it was moved back to Earth, and renamed as Xavier Institute for Mutant Education and Outreach when Storm took over the school.

Notations:

- This list documents the fictional members of student body and staff (excluding the residents or refugees of X-Mansion and unconfirmed members of student body/staff) with the overview of training squads.
- A slash (/) between codenames, indicates the character having multiple names during their tenure at schools in chronological order.
- Characters listed are set in the Earth-616 continuity except when noted.

== Staff members ==
Character	Name	Notes
Alicia Downing		School: Xavier Institute for Higher Learning; Guidance counselor
Angel	Warren Kenneth Worthington III	School: Xavier Institute for Higher Learning and Jean Grey School for Higher Learning; Teaching class: Flight; Recruiter and teaching assistant
Annie Ghazikhanian		School: Xavier Institute for Higher Learning; Nurse
Armor	Hisako Ichiki	School: Jean Grey School for Higher Learning; Teaching assistant
Banshee	Sean Cassidy	School: Massachusetts Academy; Headmaster (Note: These were the headmasters and headmistress of the following schools: Xavier's School for Gifted Youngsters – Professor X and Magneto; Xavier Institute for Higher Learning – Professor X, Jean Grey, Cyclops and White Queen; Massachusetts Academy – Banshee and White Queen; Jean Grey School for Higher Learning – Wolverine, Kitty Pryde and Storm. Iceman and Lockheed were also made headmasters temporarily.; Xavier Institute for Mutant Education and Outreach – Storm)
Beast	Henry "Hank" Philip McCoy	School: Xavier Institute for Higher Learning and Jean Grey School for Higher Learning; Teaching class: Biology, Mutant Philosophy, [Quantum Biophysics, Molecular Pylogenetics and Other Scientific Concepts] and Science; Advising squad: Exemplars; Vice Principal
Cannonball	Samuel "Sam" Zachary Guthrie	School: Jean Grey School for Higher Learning; Teaching class: Flying Into Things Headfirst; Junior staff member
Chamber	Jonothon "Jono" Starsmore	School: Jean Grey School for Higher Learning; Teaching class: Coping With Physical Changes, Professional standards and Psychology; Junior staff member
Colossus	Piotr "Peter" Nikolaievitch Rasputin	School: Xavier Institute for Higher Learning; Teaching class: Art
Cyclops	Scott Summers	School: Xavier Institute for Higher Learning; Teaching class: Geometry, and Leadership and tactics Advising squad: Corsairs; Headmaster
Cypher	Douglas "Doug" Aaron Ramsey	School: Jean Grey School for Higher Learning; Teaching class: Communications and Foreign language Junior staff member
Deathlok		School: Jean Grey School for Higher Learning; Administrative assistant
Doop		School: Jean Grey School for Higher Learning; Teaching class: Introduction to Religion; Adjunct staff member, chef and receptionist
Firestar	Angelica Jones	School: Jean Grey School for Higher Learning; Teaching class: Chemistry and Physics; Junior staff member
Frenzy	Joanna Cargill	School: Jean Grey School for Higher Learning; Teaching class: Gym and Hand-to-Hand Combat; Adjunct staff member
Gambit	Remy LeBeau	School: Xavier Institute for Higher Learning and Jean Grey School for Higher Learning; Teaching class: How to Weaponize Household Products and Sex Ed; Advising squad: Chevaliers; Senior staff member
Husk	Paige Guthrie	School: Jean Grey School for Higher Learning; Teaching class: Mutant Literature and History of Mutant Art; Guidance councelor and junior staff member
Iceman	Robert "Bobby" Louis Drake	School: Xavier Institute for Higher Learning and Jean Grey School for Higher Learning; Teaching class: Accounting, Algebra, and Zen and the Art of Ice Sculpture; Advising squad: Excelsiors; Bookkeeper, senior staff member and temporary headmaster
Karma	Xuân Cao Mạnh	School: Xavier Institute for Higher Learning and Jean Grey School for Higher Learning; Teaching class: French; Advising squad: Alpha Squadron; Junior staff member, librarian and secretary to the headmaster
Kavita Rao		School: Jean Grey School for Higher Learning; Physician
Kid Omega	Quintavius "Quentin" Quirinius Quire	School: Jean Grey School for Higher Learning; Teaching assistant
Lockheed		School: Jean Grey School for Higher Learning; Teaching class: Know Your Alien Races; Temporary headmaster
Magma	Amara Juliana Olivians Aquilla	School: Xavier Institute for Higher Learning; Teaching class: Geology; Advising squad: Paragons
Magneto	Max Eisenhardt	School: Xavier's School for Gifted Youngsters; Headmaster
Marilyn Hannah		School: Xavier Institute for Higher Learning; In-charge of cafeteria
Marvel Girl / Phoenix	Jean Elaine Grey	School: Xavier Institute for Higher Learning; Headmistress
Marvel Girl	Rachel Anne Grey (birth surname Summers)	School: Jean Grey School for Higher Learning; Teaching class: Brain Spelunking, Downloading Foreign Languages, Outer Space Survival Skills, Psychic Self Defense, Psychwar and Zero Gravity Mobility; Senior staff member
Mimic	Calvin Rankin	School: Jean Grey School for Higher Learning
Mirage	Danielle "Dani" Moonstar	School: Xavier Institute for Higher Learning; Teaching class: American history Advising squad: New Mutants
Moira MacTaggert		School: Xavier's School for Gifted Youngsters; Groundskeeper
Nightcrawler	Kurt Wagner	School: Xavier Institute for Higher Learning and Jean Grey School for Higher Learning; Teaching class: Drama
Northstar	Jean-Paul Beaubier	School: Xavier Institute for Higher Learning; Teaching class: Business, Flight and French; Advising squad: Alpha Squadron; Senior staff member
Professor X	Charles Francis Xavier	School: Xavier's School for Gifted Youngsters, Xavier Institute for Higher Learning and Jean Grey School for Higher Learning; Headmaster
Psylocke	Elizabeth "Betsy" Braddock	School: Jean Grey School for Higher Learning
Rogue	Anne Marie LeBeau	School: Xavier Institute for Higher Learning and Jean Grey School for Higher Learning; Teaching class: Diction and Linguistics, and Zero Gravity Mobility; Advising squad: Advocates; Senior staff member
Shadowcat / Professor K	Katherine "Kitty" Anne Pryde	School: Xavier Institute for Higher Learning and Jean Grey School for Higher Learning; Teaching class: Computer-Hacking, Ethics and Future History; Advising squad: Paladins; Headmistress and senior staff member
Sanji Yamamoto		School: Xavier Institute for Higher Learning; Kitchen staff member
Sharon Friedlander		School: Xavier's School for Gifted Youngsters; Nurse
Stevie Hunter		School: Xavier's School for Gifted Youngsters; Teaching class: Dance
Storm	Ororo Munroe	School: Xavier Institute for Higher Learning and Jean Grey School for Higher Learning; Teaching class: Mutant History; Headmistress and advisor of unnamed squad
Thomas "Tom" Corsi		School: Xavier's School for Gifted Youngsters and Xavier Institute for Higher Learning; Teaching class: Physical education
Toad	Mortimer Toynbee	School: Jean Grey School for Higher Learning; Janitor
Warbird	Ava'Dara Naganandini	School: Jean Grey School for Higher Learning; Teaching class: Art; Junior staff member
White Queen	Emma Frost	School: Xavier Institute for Higher Learning; Teaching class: Ethics; Advising squad: Hellions; Headmistress
Wolfsbane	Rahne Sinclair	School: Xavier Institute for Higher Learning; Advising squad: Paragons; Teaching assistant
Wolverine	James "Logan" Howlett	School: Xavier Institute for Higher Learning and Jean Grey School for Higher Learning; Teaching class: Art of Fighting With Fighting, Art of Fighting Without Fighting, English Literature, Survival and World History; Headmaster
Xorn	Kuan Yin-Xorn	School: Xavier Institute for Higher Learning; Special class teacher

== Student body ==
=== 1963–1970s ===
Character	Name	Joined in	Notes
Cyclops	Scott Summers (Note: These are the alumni who became members of X-Men: First class – Angel, Beast, Cyclops, Havok, Iceman, Jean Grey and Polaris; Second class – Boom-Boom, Cannonball, Cypher, Karma, Kitty Pryde, Magik, Magma, Mirage, Sunspot, Warlock and Wolfsbane; Massachusetts Academy – Chamber, Husk, Jubilee, Maggott, Monet St. Croix and Synch; Academy X era – Armor, Gentle, Laura Kinney, Pixie and Prodigy; Jean Grey School – Hope Summers, Idie Okonkwo and Ink; Others – Colossus, Kid Omega, Multiple Man and Rogue)	X-Men #1 (September 1963) Time-displaced X-Men: All-New X-Men #5 (January 2012)	School: Xavier's School for Gifted Youngsters and Jean Grey School for Higher Learning; Student of the First class.
Iceman	Robert "Bobby" Louis Drake	X-Men #1 (September 1963) Time-displaced X-Men: All-New X-Men #5 (January 2012)	School: Xavier's School for Gifted Youngsters and Jean Grey School for Higher Learning; Student of the First class.
Beast	Henry "Hank" Philip McCoy	X-Men #1 (September 1963) Time-displaced X-Men: All-New X-Men #5 (January 2012)	School: Xavier's School for Gifted Youngsters and Jean Grey School for Higher Learning; Student of the First class.
Angel	Warren Kenneth Worthington III	X-Men #1 (September 1963) Time-displaced X-Men: All-New X-Men #5 (January 2012)	School: Xavier's School for Gifted Youngsters and Jean Grey School for Higher Learning; Student of the First class.
Marvel Girl	Jean Elaine Grey	X-Men #1 (September 1963) Time-displaced X-Men: All-New X-Men #5 (January 2012)	School: Xavier's School for Gifted Youngsters and Jean Grey School for Higher Learning; Student of the First class.
Polaris	Lorna Sally Dane	X-Men #60 (September 1969)	School: Xavier's School for Gifted Youngsters; Student of the First class.
Havok	Alexander "Alex" Summers	X-Men #65 (February 1970)	School: Xavier's School for Gifted Youngsters; Student of the First class.
Multiple Man	James "Jamie" Arthur Madrox	Giant-Size Fantastic Four #4 (February 1975)	School: Xavier's School for Gifted Youngsters
Colossus	Piotr "Peter" Nikolaievitch Rasputin	Giant-Size X-Men #1 (July 1975)	School: Xavier's School for Gifted Youngsters

=== 1980s ===
Character	Name	Joined in	Notes
Sprite / Ariel	Katherine "Kitty" Anne Pryde	X-Men #138 (October 1980)	School: Xavier's School for Gifted Youngsters; Student of the Second class.
Karma	Xuân Cao Mạnh	Marvel Graphic Novel #4 (November 1982)	School: Xavier's School for Gifted Youngsters; Student of the Second class.
Wolfsbane	Rahne Sinclair	Marvel Graphic Novel #4 (November 1982)	School: Xavier's School for Gifted Youngsters; Student of the Second class.
Psyche / Mirage	Danielle "Dani" Moonstar	Marvel Graphic Novel #4 (November 1982)	School: Xavier's School for Gifted Youngsters; Student of the Second class.
Cannonball	Samuel "Sam" Zachary Guthrie	Marvel Graphic Novel #4 (November 1982)	School: Xavier's School for Gifted Youngsters; Student of the Second class.
Sunspot	Roberto "Bobby" da Costa	Marvel Graphic Novel #4 (November 1982)	School: Xavier's School for Gifted Youngsters; Student of the Second class.
Magik	Illyana Rasputina	Uncanny X-Men #164 (December 1982)	School: Xavier's School for Gifted Youngsters; Student of the Second class.
Rogue	Anna Marie LeBeau	Uncanny X-Men #171 (July 1983)	School: Xavier's School for Gifted Youngsters
Magma	Amara Juliana Olivians Aquilla	New Mutants #13 (March 1984)	School: Xavier's School for Gifted Youngsters; Student of the Second class.
Cypher	Douglas "Doug" Aaron Ramsey	New Mutants #21 (November 1984)	School: Xavier's School for Gifted Youngsters; Student of the Second class.
Warlock		New Mutants #21 (November 1984)	School: Xavier's School for Gifted Youngsters; Student of the Second class.
Boom-Boom	Tabitha Smith	New Mutants #76 (July 1989)	School: Xavier's School for Gifted Youngsters; Student of the Second class.
Firefist	Russell "Rusty" Collins	New Mutants #76 (July 1989)	School: Xavier's School for Gifted Youngsters; Student of the Second class.
Rictor	Julio Esteban Richter	New Mutants #76 (July 1989)	School: Xavier's School for Gifted Youngsters; Student of the Second class.
Skids	Sally Blevins	New Mutants #76 (July 1989)	School: Xavier's School for Gifted Youngsters; Student of the Second class.

=== 1990s ===
Character	Name	Joined in	Notes
Chamber	Jonothon "Jono" Evan Starsmore	Generation X #1 (November 1994)	School: Massachusetts Academy; Member of Generation X.
Husk	Paige Guthrie	Generation X #1 (November 1994)	School: Massachusetts Academy; Member of Generation X.
Jubilee	Jubilation Lee	Generation X #1 (November 1994)	School: Massachusetts Academy; Member of Generation X.
M	Claudette St. Croix	Generation X #1 (November 1994)	School: Massachusetts Academy; Member of Generation X.
M	Nicole St. Croix	Generation X #1 (November 1994)	School: Massachusetts Academy; Member of Generation X.
Skin	Angelo Espinosa	Generation X #1 (November 1994)	School: Massachusetts Academy; Member of Generation X.
Synch	Everett Thomas	Generation X #1 (November 1994)	School: Massachusetts Academy; Member of Generation X.
Mondo		Generation X Annual (January 1995)	School: Massachusetts Academy; Member of Generation X.
M / Penance	Monet Yvette Clarisse Maria Therese St. Croix	Generation X #3 (January 1995)	School: Massachusetts Academy; Member of Generation X.
Artie Maddicks		Generation X #5 (July 1995)	School: Massachusetts Academy
Leech		Generation X #5 (July 1995)	School: Massachusetts Academy
Franklin Richards		Generation X #20 (October 1996)	School: Massachusetts Academy
Gaia		Generation X #43 (October 1998)	School: Massachusetts Academy; Member of Generation X.
Maggott	Japheth	Generation X #48 (February 1999)	School: Massachusetts Academy

=== 2000s ===
Character	Name	Joined in	Notes
Beak	Barnell Bohusk	New X-Men #117 (September 2001)	School: Xavier Institute for Higher Learning; Student of the Special class. (Note: There were two iterations of Special class: In Xavier Institute, Xorn's class had the following students – Angel Salvadore, Basilisk, Beak, Dummy, Ernst and No-Girl.; In Jean Grey School, Spider-Man's class had the following students – Ernst, Eye Boy, Glob Herman, Hellion, No-Girl, Rockslide and Shark-Girl.)
Cephalopod	Molly Stanwick	New X-Men #117 (September 2001)	School: Xavier Institute for Higher Learning
Crater	Erik Hallgrimsson	New X-Men #117 (September 2001)	School: Xavier Institute for Higher Learning
Forearm	Marcus Tucker	New X-Men #117 (September 2001)	School: Xavier Institute for Higher Learning
Glob Herman	Robert Herman	New X-Men #117 (September 2001)	School: Xavier Institute for Higher Learning and Jean Grey School for Higher Learning; Student of the Special class.
Pako	Cirlio Crisologo	New X-Men #117 (September 2001)	School: Xavier Institute for Higher Learning
Stepford Cuckoos (Note: Collectively, Stepford Cuckoos had used Five-in-One codename and after the deaths of Esme and Sophie, remaining sisters opted for Three-in-One.)	Celeste Cuckoo	New X-Men #118 (October 2001)	School: Xavier Institute for Higher Learning and Jean Grey School for Higher Learning; Squad: Corsairs
Stepford Cuckoos	Esme Cuckoo	New X-Men #118 (October 2001)	School: Xavier Institute for Higher Learning
Stepford Cuckoos	Irma "Mindee" Cuckoo	New X-Men #118 (October 2001)	School: Xavier Institute for Higher Learning and Jean Grey School for Higher Learning; Squad: Corsairs
Stepford Cuckoos	Phoebe Cuckoo	New X-Men #118 (October 2001)	School: Xavier Institute for Higher Learning and Jean Grey School for Higher Learning; Squad: Corsairs
Stepford Cuckoos	Sophie Cuckoo	New X-Men #118 (October 2001)	School: Xavier Institute for Higher Learning
Choir	Irina Clayton	New X-Men #119 (November 2001)	School: Xavier Institute for Higher Learning
Angel Salvadore		New X-Men #120 (December 2001)	School: Xavier Institute for Higher Learning; Squad: Exemplars; Student of the Special class.
Eosimias	Hong Lianje	New X-Men #123 (February 2002)	School: Xavier Institute for Higher Learning
Stuff		New X-Men #123 (February 2002)	School: Xavier Institute for Higher Learning; Imperial Guard who posed as "Kato Anishiwa" to infiltrate the school.
Mentat	Robert Zepheniah	New X-Men #124 (March 2002)	School: Xavier Institute for Higher Learning
Contact	Frida Rivera	New X-Men #126 (May 2002)	School: Xavier Institute for Higher Learning
Imp	Anders Nobel	New X-Men #126 (May 2002)	School: Xavier Institute for Higher Learning
Keratin	Dave Finn	New X-Men #126 (May 2002)	School: Xavier Institute for Higher Learning
Polymer	Dana Holmes	New X-Men #126 (May 2002)	School: Xavier Institute for Higher Learning
Radian	Christian Cord	New X-Men #126 (May 2002)	School: Xavier Institute for Higher Learning
Redneck	Vincent Stewart	New X-Men #126 (May 2002)	School: Xavier Institute for Higher Learning
Slick	Quincy Marrow	New X-Men #126 (May 2002)	School: Xavier Institute for Higher Learning
Spike	Gary Walsh	New X-Men #126 (May 2002)	School: Xavier Institute for Higher Learning
Stalwart	Adewale Ekoku	New X-Men #126 (May 2002)	School: Xavier Institute for Higher Learning
Tattoo	Christine Cord	New X-Men #126 (May 2002)	School: Xavier Institute for Higher Learning
Elanor Sanford		X-Men Unlimited #36 (May 2002)	School: Xavier Institute for Higher Learning
Ruth Durie		X-Men Unlimited #36 (May 2002)	School: Xavier Institute for Higher Learning
Butterfly	Lucy Priest	New X-Men #132 (September 2002)	School: Xavier Institute for Higher Learning
Wolf Cub	Nicholas Gleason	Chamber #1 (October 2002)	School: Xavier Institute for Higher Learning; Squad: Paragons
Squid-Boy	Samuel "Sammy" Paré	Uncanny X-Men #410 (October 2002)	School: Xavier Institute for Higher Learning
Carter Ghazikhanian		Uncanny X-Men #412 (October 2002)	School: Xavier Institute for Higher Learning; Student of the Lower School.
Walter Lambert		Chamber #2 (November 2002)	School: Xavier Institute for Higher Learning; Human student from exchange program of Empire State University.
Elf	Natalie Wood	New X-Men #134 (November 2002)	School: Xavier Institute for Higher Learning
Kid Omega	Quintavius "Quentin" Quirinius Quire	New X-Men #134 (November 2002)	School: Xavier Institute for Higher Learning and Jean Grey School for Higher Learning
No-Girl	Martha Johansson	New X-Men #134 (November 2002)	School: Xavier Institute for Higher Learning and Jean Grey School for Higher Learning; Student of the Special class.
Basilisk	Mike Columbus	New X-Men #135 (December 2002)	School: Xavier Institute for Higher Learning; Student of the Special class.
Ernst		New X-Men #135 (December 2002)	School: Xavier Institute for Higher Learning and Jean Grey School for Higher Learning; Student of the Special class.
Dummy	Dean Boswell	New X-Men #135 (December 2002)	School: Xavier Institute for Higher Learning; Student of the Special class.
Gloom	Jordan Lewis	X-Treme X-Men #20 (March 2003)	School: Xavier Institute for Higher Learning
Jeffrey Garrett		X-Treme X-Men #20 (March 2003)	School: Xavier Institute for Higher Learning; Student of the Lower School.
Overlay	Zach Halliwell	X-Treme X-Men #20 (March 2003)	School: Xavier Institute for Higher Learning
Rubbermaid	Andrea Margulies	X-Treme X-Men #20 (March 2003)	School: Xavier Institute for Higher Learning; Squad: Alpha Squadron
Silicon	Stan Finch	X-Treme X-Men #20 (March 2003)	School: Xavier Institute for Higher Learning
Saurus	Jorge Lukas	X-Treme X-Men #20 (March 2003)	School: Xavier Institute for Higher Learning
Tantra	Reuben O'Hara	X-Treme X-Men #20 (March 2003)	School: Xavier Institute for Higher Learning
Dust	Sooraya Qadir	New X-Men #138 (March 2003)	School: Xavier Institute for Higher Learning and Jean Grey School for Higher Learning; Squad: Hellions
Longneck	William Hanover	New X-Men #140 (April 2003)	School: Xavier Institute for Higher Learning
Anole	Victor Borkowski	New Mutants, vol. 2 #2 (July 2003)	School: Xavier Institute for Higher Learning and Jean Grey School for Higher Learning; Squad: Alpha Squadron
Hellion	Julian Keller	New Mutants, vol. 2 #2 (July 2003)	School: Xavier Institute for Higher Learning and Jean Grey School for Higher Learning; Squad: Hellions; Student of the Special class.
Mercury	Cessily Kincaid	New Mutants, vol. 2 #2 (July 2003)	School: Xavier Institute for Higher Learning and Jean Grey School for Higher Learning; Squad: Hellions
Wallflower	Laurie Collins	New Mutants, vol. 2 #2 (July 2003)	School: Xavier Institute for Higher Learning; Squad: New Mutants
Wind Dancer	Sofia Mantega	New Mutants, vol. 2 #2 (July 2003)	School: Xavier Institute for Higher Learning; Squad: New Mutants
Rockslide	Santo Vaccarro	New Mutants, vol. 2 #3 (July 2003)	School: Xavier Institute for Higher Learning and Jean Grey School for Higher Learning; Squad: Hellions; Student of the Special class.
Wither	Kevin Ford	New Mutants, vol. 2 #3 (July 2003)	School: Xavier Institute for Higher Learning; Squad: Hellions and New Mutants
Leong Coy Mahn		New Mutants, vol. 2 #4 (September 2003)	School: Xavier Institute for Higher Learning; Student of the Lower School.
Nga Cao Mạnh		New Mutants, vol. 2 #4 (September 2003)	School: Xavier Institute for Higher Learning; Student of the Lower School.
Prodigy	David Alleyne	New Mutants, vol. 2 #4 (September 2003)	School: Xavier Institute for Higher Learning; Squad: New Mutants
Elixir	Josh Foley	New Mutants, vol. 2 #6 (December 2003)	School: Xavier Institute for Higher Learning; Squad: New Mutants
Caput	Abraham Verne	New Mutants, vol. 2 #7 (December 2003)	School: Xavier Institute for Higher Learning
Gelatin	Carlo Brewster	New Mutants, vol. 2 #7 (December 2003)	School: Xavier Institute for Higher Learning
Viskid	Adrian Defoe	New Mutants, vol. 2 #7 (December 2003)	School: Xavier Institute for Higher Learning
Spencer Bronson		Mystique #12 (March 2004)	School: Xavier Institute for Higher Learning
Cryptid	Andy Hartnell	X-Men Unlimited, vol.2 #1 (April 2004)	School: Xavier Institute for Higher Learning
Hothead	Germaine Caruso	New X-Men #156 (April 2004)	School: Xavier Institute for Higher Learning
Specter	Dallas Gibson	New Mutants, vol. 2 #10 (May 2004)	School: Xavier Institute for Higher Learning; Squad: Corsairs, Hellions and Paragons
Tag	Brian Cruz	New Mutants, vol. 2 #10 (May 2004)	School: Xavier Institute for Higher Learning; Squad: Hellions
Surge	Noriko "Nori" Ashida	New Mutants, vol. 2 #10 (May 2004)	School: Xavier Institute for Higher Learning and Jean Grey School for Higher Learning; Squad: New Mutants
Aero	Melody Guthrie	Uncanny X-Men #444 (May 2004)	School: Xavier Institute for Higher Learning
Boggart	Robin Wise	Uncanny X-Men #444 (May 2004)	School: Xavier Institute for Higher Learning; Squad: Advocates
Naiad	Aurelie Sabayon	Uncanny X-Men #444 (May 2004)	School: Xavier Institute for Higher Learning; Squad: Advocates
Pinpoint	Gerard Cooper	Uncanny X-Men #444 (May 2004)	School: Xavier Institute for Higher Learning; Squad: Advocates
Trovão	Pedro de Noli	Uncanny X-Men #444 (May 2004)	School: Xavier Institute for Higher Learning; Squad: Advocates
Umbra	Patrick Nesbitt	Uncanny X-Men #444 (May 2004)	School: Xavier Institute for Higher Learning; Squad: Advocates
Xenon	Shaun Kennedy	Uncanny X-Men #444 (May 2004)	School: Xavier Institute for Higher Learning; Squad: Advocates
Icarus	Joshua "Jay" Guthrie	X-Men #157 (May 2004)	School: Xavier Institute for Higher Learning; Squad: New Mutants and Hellions
Audio	Raymond Keyes	New X-Men: Academy X #1 (May 2004)	School: Xavier Institute for Higher Learning
Dryad	Callie Betto	New X-Men: Academy X #1 (May 2004)	School: Xavier Institute for Higher Learning; Squad: Corsairs
Quill	Maxwell Jordan	New X-Men: Academy X #1 (May 2004)	School: Xavier Institute for Higher Learning; Squad: Corsairs
DJ	Mark Sheppard	New X-Men: Academy X #2 (June 2004)	School: Xavier Institute for Higher Learning; Squad: Paragons and Corsairs
Wing	Edward Tancredi	Astonishing X-Men, vol. 3 #3 (July 2004)	School: Xavier Institute for Higher Learning; Squad: Paladins
Skylark	Greg Carlson	X-Men Unlimited, vol. 2 #3 (August 2004)	School: Xavier Institute for Higher Learning
Armor	Hisako Ichiki	Astonishing X-Men, vol. 3 #4 (August 2004)	School: Xavier Institute for Higher Learning and Jean Grey School for Higher Learning; Squad: Paladins
Loa	Alani Ryan	New X-Men: Academy X #5 (September 2004)	School: Xavier Institute for Higher Learning; Squad: Alpha Squadron
Pixie	Megan Gwynn	New X-Men: Academy X #5 (September 2004)	School: Xavier Institute for Higher Learning and Jean Grey School for Higher Learning; Squad: Paragons
Updraft	Johan Schumann	Wolverine, vol. 3 #21 (October 2004)	School: Xavier Institute for Higher Learning
Indra	Paras Gavaskar	New X-Men: Academy X #7 (December 2004)	School: Xavier Institute for Higher Learning and Jean Grey School for Higher Learning; Squad: Alpha Squadron
Match	Ben Hammil	New X-Men: Academy X #7 (December 2004)	School: Xavier Institute for Higher Learning and Jean Grey School for Higher Learning; Squad: Paragons
Marie Jennifer D'Ancanto		Uncanny X-Men #450 (December 2004)	School: Xavier Institute for Higher Learning; Human whose family was killed by mutants.
Blindfold	Ruth Aldine	Astonishing X-Men, vol. 3 #7 (December 2004)	School: Xavier Institute for Higher Learning and Jean Grey School for Higher Learning; Squad: Paladins
Seth Walker		Nightcrawler #4 (December 2004)	School: Xavier Institute for Higher Learning
Hitch-Hiker	Connor Laughlin	X-Men Unlimited, vol. 2 #6 (February 2005)	School: Xavier Institute for Higher Learning
Spirit	Jacob Pace	X-Men Unlimited, vol. 2 #7 (April 2005)	School: Xavier Institute for Higher Learning
Kidogo	Lazaro Kotikash	New X-Men: Academy X #12 (April 2005)	School: Xavier Institute for Higher Learning; Squad: Alpha Squadron
Preview	Jessica Vale	New X-Men: Academy X #12 (April 2005)	School: Xavier Institute for Higher Learning; Squad: Paragons
Trance	Hope Abbott	New X-Men: Academy X #12 (April 2005)	School: Xavier Institute for Higher Learning and Jean Grey School for Higher Learning; Squad: Paragons
Network	Sarah Vale	New X-Men: Academy X #13 (May 2005)	School: Xavier Institute for Higher Learning; Squad: Alpha Squadron
Flood	Eugene Walker	Gambit, vol. 4 #10 (May 2005)	School: Xavier Institute for Higher Learning
View	Winston Frankowski	Gambit, vol. 4 #10 (May 2005)	School: Xavier Institute for Higher Learning
Bling!	Roxanne "Roxy" Washington	X-Men #171 (June 2005)	School: Xavier Institute for Higher Learning and Jean Grey School for Higher Learning; Squad: Chevaliers
Foxx	Raven Darkhölme	X-Men #171 (June 2005)	School: Xavier Institute for Higher Learning; Squad: Chevaliers; Revealed to be Mystique in disguise.
Flubber	Nick Shelley	X-Men #171 (June 2005)	School: Xavier Institute for Higher Learning; Squad: Chevaliers
Onyxx	Sidney Green	X-Men #171 (June 2005)	School: Xavier Institute for Higher Learning; Squad: Chevaliers
Rain Boy	Carl Aalston	X-Men #171 (June 2005)	School: Xavier Institute for Higher Learning; Squad: Chevaliers
Cudgel	Liam Bremner	X-Men Unlimited, vol. 2 #10 (August 2005)	School: Xavier Institute for Higher Learning
Elsewhere	Jaime Vanderwall	X-Men Unlimited, vol. 2 #10 (August 2005)	School: Xavier Institute for Higher Learning
Iolanthe	Katie Atkinson	X-Men Unlimited, vol. 2 #10 (August 2005)	School: Xavier Institute for Higher Learning
Lipid	Anne Moore	X-Men Unlimited, vol. 2 #10 (August 2005)	School: Xavier Institute for Higher Learning
Pinocchio	Frank Ludlum	X-Men Unlimited, vol. 2 #10 (August 2005)	School: Xavier Institute for Higher Learning
Protozoa	Linus Sinker	X-Men Unlimited, vol. 2 #10 (August 2005)	School: Xavier Institute for Higher Learning
Hydro	Noah Crichton	New X-Men, vol. 2 #20 (November 2005)	School: Xavier Institute for Higher Learning
X-23 / Wolverine	Laura Kinney	New X-Men, vol. 2 #21 (December 2005)	School: Xavier Institute for Higher Learning
Gentle	Nezhno Abidemi	New X-Men, vol. 2 #23 (February 2006)	School: Xavier Institute for Higher Learning and Jean Grey School for Higher Learning; Squad: Storm's squad
Collider	James Prindle	Generation M #4 (April 2006)	School: Xavier Institute for Higher Learning
Cipher	Alisa Tager	Young X-Men #10 (January 2009, retconned to occur during New X-Men)	School: Xavier Institute for Higher Learning

=== 2010s ===
Character	Name	Joined in	Notes
Broo		Wolverine & the X-Men #1 (October 2011)	School: Jean Grey School for Higher Learning
Jonas Graymalkin		Wolverine & the X-Men #1 (October 2011)	School: Jean Grey School for Higher Learning
Oya	Idie Okonkwo	Wolverine & the X-Men #1 (October 2011)	School: Jean Grey School for Higher Learning
Kid Gladiator	Kubark	Wolverine & the X-Men #1 (October 2011)	School: Jean Grey School for Higher Learning; Strontian student
Face		New Mutants, vol. 3 #33 (November 2011)	School: Jean Grey School for Higher Learning
Genesis / Kid Apocalypse	Evan Sabahnur	Wolverine and the X-Men #4 (January 2012)	School: Jean Grey School for Higher Learning
Crosta		Wolverine & the X-Men #15 (August 2012)	School: Jean Grey School for Higher Learning
Hope Summers		Wolverine & the X-Men #15 (August 2012)	School: Jean Grey School for Higher Learning
Primal	Teon Macik	Wolverine & the X-Men #15 (August 2012)	School: Jean Grey School for Higher Learning
Velocidad	Gabriel Cohuelo	Wolverine & the X-Men #15 (August 2012)	School: Jean Grey School for Higher Learning
Eye Boy	Trevor Hawkins	Wolverine & the X-Men #19 (October 2012)	School: Jean Grey School for Higher Learning; Student of the Special class.
Sprite	Jia Jing	Wolverine & the X-Men #19 (October 2012)	School: Jean Grey School for Higher Learning
Shark-Girl	Iara Dos Santos	Wolverine & the X-Men #20 (November 2012)	School: Jean Grey School for Higher Learning; Student of the Special class.
Spider-Girl	Gwen Warren	Avenging Spider-Man #16 (January 2013, confirmed in X-Men Unlimited Infinity Comic #69)	School: Jean Grey School for Higher Learning; Human-Mutant hybrid student
Transonic	Laurie Tromette	Wolverine & the X-Men #25 (February 2013)	School: Jean Grey School for Higher Learning
Dr. Frankenstein	Maximilian "Max" Frankenstein (birth surname von Katzenelnbogen)	Wolverine & the X-Men #35 (August 2013)	School: Jean Grey School for Higher Learning; Human student
Manuel Enduque		Wolverine & the X-Men #35 (August 2013)	School: Jean Grey School for Higher Learning; Human student
Squidface	Josephine Bricklemoore	Wolverine & the X-Men #39 (December 2013)	School: Jean Grey School for Higher Learning; S.H.I.E.L.D. agents who posed as mutants to infiltrate the school using the Mutant Growth Hormone.
Tri-Joey	Joseph Bricklemoore	Wolverine & the X-Men #39 (December 2013)	School: Jean Grey School for Higher Learning; S.H.I.E.L.D. agents who posed as mutants to infiltrate the school using the Mutant Growth Hormone.
Krakoa		Wolverine & the X-Men, vol. 2 #1 (March 2014)	School: Jean Grey School for Higher Learning
Nature Girl	Lin Li	Wolverine & the X-Men, vol. 2 #1 (March 2014)	School: Jean Grey School for Higher Learning
Scorpion Boy	Rico	Nightcrawler, vol. 4 #1 (April 2014)	School: Jean Grey School for Higher Learning
Flourish / Creep	Marisol Guerra	Storm, vol. 3 #1 (July 2014)	School: Jean Grey School for Higher Learning
Ink	Eric Gitter	X-Men, vol. 4 #19 (September 2014)	School: Jean Grey School for Higher Learning
Ziggy Karst		Nightcrawler, vol. 4 #8 (December 2014)	School: Jean Grey School for Higher Learning
Bo		Uncanny X-Men, vol. 3 #33 (April 2015)	School: Jean Grey School for Higher Learning
Goldballs	Fabio Medina	Uncanny X-Men, vol. 3 #35 (July 2015)	School: Jean Grey School for Higher Learning; Transferred from New Charles Xavier School for New Mutants.
Hijack	David Bond	Uncanny X-Men, vol. 3 #35 (July 2015)	School: Jean Grey School for Higher Learning; Transferred from New Charles Xavier School for New Mutants.
Morph	Benjamin "Ben" Deeds	Uncanny X-Men, vol. 3 #35 (July 2015)	School: Jean Grey School for Higher Learning; Transferred from New Charles Xavier School for New Mutants.
Triage	Christopher Muse	Uncanny X-Men, vol. 3 #35 (July 2015)	School: Jean Grey School for Higher Learning; Transferred from New Charles Xavier School for New Mutants.
Belen		X-Men: Blue #3 (May 2017)	School: Xavier Institute for Mutant Education and Outreach
Hindsight	Nathaniel Carver	Generation X, vol. 2 #1 (May, 2017)	School: Xavier Institute for Mutant Education and Outreach
Zachary		Iceman, vol. 3 #2 (June 2017)	School: Xavier Institute for Mutant Education and Outreach
Michaela Ladak		Iceman, vol. 3 #4 (August 2017)	School: Xavier Institute for Mutant Education and Outreach
Metus		Cable #159 (July 2018)	School: Xavier Institute for Mutant Education and Outreach
Manon		Extermination #5 (December 2018)	School: Xavier Institute for Mutant Education and Outreach
Maxime		Extermination #5 (December 2018)	School: Xavier Institute for Mutant Education and Outreach

=== 2020s ===
Character	Name	Joined in	Notes
Melee	Thao Tran	Exceptional X-Men #3 (November 2024)	
Axo	Alejandro Luna	Exceptional X-Men #3 (November 2024)	
Bronze	Trista Marshall	Exceptional X-Men #3 (November 2024)	
Jitter	Sofia Yong	Uncanny X-Men, vol. 6 #2 (August 2024)	
Calico	Becca Simon-Pinette	Uncanny X-Men, vol. 6 #2 (August 2024)	
Ransom	Valentin Correa	Uncanny X-Men, vol. 6 #2 (August 2024)	
Deathdream	Hotoru Hashimoto	Uncanny X-Men, vol. 6 #2 (August 2024)	
Animalia	Jennifer Starkey	X-Men vol. 7 #21 (September 2024)	
Ben Liu

== See also ==
- List of X-Men members
