= Glob Herman =

Marvel Comics character

Publication information
- Publisher: Marvel Comics
- First appearance: New X-Men #117 (September 2001)
- Created by: Grant Morrison; Ethan Van Sciver

In-story information
- Alter ego: Robert Herman
- Species: Human mutant
- Team affiliations: Xavier Institute; Omega Gang; The 198; Jean Grey School; Hellfire Academy; X-Men in training New Mutants; X-Men
- Abilities: Superhuman strength, durability, and speed; Wax physiology

Glob Herman (Robert Herman) is a fictional mutant character that appears in American comic books published by Marvel Comics. The character, created by Grant Morrison and Ethan Van Sciver, first appeared in New X-Men #117 (September 2001). Glob Herman's mutation transforms his flesh into translucent, pink paraffin wax, leaving his internal organs and skeleton visible while giving him enhanced strength, durability, and inflammability.

Glob joined the Xavier Institute as a student, but he later became rebellious and disillusioned with the views of the X-Men after befriending Quentin Quire. He retained his mutation after M-Day and has continued to appear alongside other mutants in places such as Utopia and Krakoa. He has also joined the X-Men and New Mutants in various storylines.

== Publication history ==
Glob Herman made his debut appearance in New X-Men #117 in September 2001. His backstory was further developed by Ed Brisson in New Mutants, vol. 4 #12.

In 2020, Glob Herman was slated to appear in the "X of Swords" story arc as teased in Free Comic Book Day 2020: X-Men #1. However, his character was ultimately replaced by Rockslide. In an October 2020 interview with Comic Book Resources, X-Men editor Jordan White revealed that Glob already had a prominent role in New Mutants during the Krakoan Age storyline, while Rockslide had received limited attention, and that because of the potential for Rockslide's character development, Glob was replaced.

== Fictional character biography ==
As a child, Glob grew up with a violent anti-mutant father who forced him to attend hate rallies. After his powers manifested, Glob became a target for his father's abuse. He was eventually rescued by his mother, who left him at the Xavier Institute for Higher Learning. Glob initially struggles with his identity before redirecting his anger toward humanity. He joins Quentin Quire's Omega Gang, a radical group of young mutants at the school. As a member, he participates in the violent retaliation against a group of humans who are suspected of having murdered Jumbo Carnation and attack the U-Men. The Omega Gang attack Professor X, accusing him of jeopardizing student safety; Glob is ultimately punished for his actions by being sent to Africa to perform humanitarian work.

Glob retains his mutant powers after M-Day and joins the Jean Grey School for Higher Learning as a student. He continues to struggle with anger issues, and briefly leaves the school to join the Hellfire Club. He later returns and, after attending a special class taught by Spider-Man, chooses to use his powers for good.

When the Terrigen Mists that are released into Earth's atmosphere by Black Bolt infect mutants with a lethal disease known as M-Pox, Glob relocates to X-Haven. After he defends X-Haven from demons, he begins training under Colossus. During this time, he forms a close friendship with the Old Man Logan and develops a romantic interest in the time-displaced Jean Grey. When Colossus vanishes after being transformed into a Horseman of Apocalypse, Glob tracks him down and defeats him. Glob also fights alongside the X-Men during the "Inhumans vs. X-Men" storyline. After the M-Pox crisis is resolved, Glob returns to Earth.

During a training mission led by Kitty Pryde, Glob Herman and his teammates crash-land in the X-Men's Blackbird jet. The team encounters and battles the Mutant Liberation Front. During the "Age of X-Man" storyline, Glob plays a key role in helping Armor and other students to uncover the false nature of their reality.

Glob becomes a resident of Krakoa after it is established as a mutant nation. During a celebration, Glob dances with Pixie and asks Armor if he has a romantic chance with her. However, she is focused on finding Beak and Angel Salvadore. Glob joins her, and the pair track the missing mutants to Nebraska. There, they find Beak caring for his sick father, and they heal him with Krakoan medicines. They are attacked by Túmulo and his men, who locate them through DOX, an anti-mutant hate website targeting mutants outside of Krakoa. After being freed by Boom-Boom, Glob joins the New Mutants in an attempt to take down DOX. When the website's publisher, Joseph Canning, attempts to intimidate the New Mutants, Glob warns him that he will take personal action against Canning if the deaths of any innocent mutants are linked to DOX's activities. DOX is ultimately taken down.

When the X-Men relocate to Alaska, Glob joins their base team as a chef and a farmer.

== Powers and abilities ==
Glob Herman's mutation transforms his skin into a translucent, pinkish biological wax that leaves his skeleton and organs visible. This transformation grants him enhanced strength and durability. His body is highly flammable, a trait he has learned to exploit by using parts of his own flaming body as weapons during combat.

== Reception ==
In August 2024, Ashley Fields of Screen Rant observed that Glob's quirky sense of humor and "unique journey" had earned him a devoted fanbase, and that his story depicted some of mutantkind's deepest struggles despite his powers' apparent lack of utility.

=== Accolades ===
- In 2022, CBR ranked Glob Herman 8th in "The Scariest Members Of The New Mutants" list.
- In 2024, CBR ranked Glob 10th in "12 Weakest X-Men Members" list.
- In 2025, CBR ranked Glob 9th in "The 10 X-Men With the Worst Powers" (strongest to weakest).

== In other media ==
- Glob Herman appears in X-Men: The Last Stand, portrayed by Clayton Watmough. This version is a member of the Brotherhood of Mutants.
- Glob Herman makes non-speaking appearances in X-Men '97.
- Glob Herman appears in Marvel Tōkon: Fighting Souls, voiced by Jason Spisak.
