= Stepford Cuckoos =

Set of fictional psychically linked mutant quintuplets appearing in Marvel Comics

Publication information
- Publisher: Marvel Comics
- First appearance: New X-Men #118 (November 2001)
- Created by: Grant Morrison; Ethan Van Sciver

In-story information
- Alter ego: Celeste Cuckoo; Esme Cuckoo; Irma "Mindee" Cuckoo; Phoebe Cuckoo; Sophie Cuckoo
- Species: Mutant clones
- Team affiliations: (The Five); Weapon Plus; Xavier Institute (Celeste, Mindee & Phoebe); Corsairs training squad Street Team X-Men; X-Men in training Jean Grey School Students; New Charles Xavier School Students (Esme); Brotherhood of Mutants (Esme & Sophie); Chaos War's Dead X-Men
- Notable aliases: Three-in-One, Five-in-One, Thousand-in-One, Weapon XIV (Units 1 to 5)
- Abilities: Telepathic hive-like super-mind, telekinesis, flawless diamond form impervious to destruction or emotion.

The Stepford Cuckoos are a set of fictional mutants, psychically linked quintuplets (Celeste Cuckoo, Esme Cuckoo, Irma "Mindee" Cuckoo, Phoebe Cuckoo, and Sophie Cuckoo) appearing in American comic books published by Marvel Comics. The alphabetical order of the Cuckoos' first names corresponds with their ages, with Celeste being the firstborn and Sophie being the youngest. Originally calling themselves the Five-in-One, after the deaths of Esme and Sophie the remaining sisters were known as the Three-in-One. They are commonly associated with the Xavier Institute for Higher Learning and successor mutant schools.

Their name "Stepford Cuckoos" is a reference to the books The Stepford Wives and The Midwich Cuckoos. The Stepford Cuckoos made their live action debut in the television series The Gifted (2017 - 2019), portrayed by Skyler Samuels.

== Publication history ==
First appearing in New X-Men #118 (November 2001), they were jointly created by Grant Morrison and Ethan Van Sciver. Their origin, as the artificially created "daughters" of Emma Frost, is revealed in X-Men: Phoenix – Warsong.

Esme and Sophie were among the feature characters in the 2011 two-issue limited series Chaos War: X-Men.

In April 2024, it was announced that Sophie would have a starring role in the second volume of NYX, set for a July 2024 release as part of the "X-Men: From the Ashes" relaunch. It is written by Collin Kelly and Jackson Lanzing with art by Francesco Mortarino. The new ongoing series centers on Sophie and several other mutant young adults – Kamala Khan, Laura Kinney, Anole, and Prodigy – attempting to adapt to life in New York City in the post-Krakoan Age when mutants are hated and feared even more due to the actions of Orchis.

== Fictional character biographies ==
=== Origins ===
The Stepford Cuckoos were created from ova cells harvested from telepath Emma Frost while she lay comatose after a Sentinel attack that killed her students, the original Hellions. Over a thousand eggs were stolen from Frost's ovaries during her coma, with the remaining clones residing within incubation chambers at Weapon Plus. They were created by Sublime to be powerful weapons able to kill every mutant by combining their telepathic abilities.

=== Xavier Institute ===
They were first introduced as the protégés and favorites of Emma Frost, and were unaware of their true purpose. A telepathic block was used to mask their placement in the school, causing anyone who questioned their origins to lose their train of thought. The Stepford Cuckoos, along with student Quentin Quire, were noted as the strongest telepaths among the new students at the Xavier Institute of Higher Learning. Although Quire and the Stepford Cuckoos were rivals, Quire had a crush on Sophie. Sophie and the other Cuckoos considered him to be disgusting and rejected him completely.

Partly as an expression of adolescent rebellion, partly under the influence of a mutant drug called Kick, and partly out of a desire to impress Sophie, Quire incites a student riot at the Xavier Institute. Sophie dies stopping Quire, overexerting herself after using the same drug to boost her powers. The Stepford Cuckoos hold Frost to be partially responsible for Sophie's death - with Frost having "inspired her to heroism" - and separate from her.

Secretly, Esme Cuckoo had been collaborating with X-Man Xorn. Taking control of the Cuckoos' group mind, she telepathically forced Angel Salvadore to attack Emma Frost, completely shattering her diamond body into fragments. Jean Grey manages to telekinetically reassemble Frost and return her to life, whereupon Frost reveals Esme's involvement in the attack. Esme abandons her sisters to join Magneto's new Brotherhood of Mutants. Later, losing faith in Xorn, the Brotherhood turns on him, killing Esme.

=== Corsairs ===
Soon afterwards, the institute is rebuilt, with Emma Frost and Cyclops as headmasters and leaders of the X-Men. Frost and Cyclops divide the older students into several six-person training squads, each taught by a staff member. The remaining three Cuckoos, now calling themselves the Three-in-One, are assigned to the Corsairs squad, advised by Cyclops.

In X-Men: Phoenix Endsong (2005), the Phoenix Force returns to Earth seeking to inhabit the body of Jean Grey. Quentin Quire, still in love with Sophie, senses the Phoenix and exhumes Sophie's body. The Phoenix resurrects Sophie, but she promptly chooses to die again rather than be with Quire. The X-Men defeat the Phoenix, though a shard of it locates Celeste.

Manipulated by both the shard of the Phoenix and Sublime, the Cuckoos reanimate Esme and Sophie as corpses and return to the World. At the World, they are greeted by a computer image of Sublime and learn of their thousands of cloned siblings. Their true purpose was to collect data on the X-Men and transmit it to the other clones through shared nanotechnology in their bodies. It is revealed that the Phoenix fragment has manifested to destroy the Cuckoos and all of their clones to prevent them from being activated as a weapon and killing all mutants. The Phoenix manifests most strongly through Celeste, using her as its avatar, but is then diffused according to Sublime's plans among each of the cloned telepaths, boosting their powers. The Cuckoos then learn that they also shared Frost's ability to turn into a diamond form. Now referring to themselves as the Thousand-in-One and under Sublime's control, the cosmically empowered psychics proceed to enact their purpose of mutant destruction. Celeste, at Frost's behest, accepts her role as a Phoenix host and wrestles control of the Phoenix, freeing the clones from Sublime's control for the first time. However, the Phoenix goes on to destroy the thousand clones, despite their newfound freedom and desire to experience life, by shattering their newly manifested diamond forms as well as Esme and Sophie. Disgusted by the destruction, Celeste casts the entity out of her body. However, it refuses to depart, causing Celeste to reabsorb it into her own and Mindee and Phoebe's diamond hearts to end the Phoenix's destruction. As a side effect, the Stepford Cuckoos are left unable to feel any emotion.

=== Manifest Destiny ===
Following the events of "Messiah Complex", the Cuckoos rejoin the X-Men in their new home of San Francisco, along with many of their former classmates. The girls later agree to help erase Elixir's memory of his work with the newly reformed X-Force team, so as to help the team maintain a sense of a secrecy from the main X-Men team. They agree to keep the team a secret, primarily out of loyalty to Cyclops. The girls begin to dress more individually than before, no longer wearing matching outfits. Each of them also have different hairstyles, with only one of the Cuckoos keeping their prior hairstyle.

=== Nation X ===
During a pitched battle between the X-Men and a pack of genetically altered versions of Predator X, the Phoenix fragments contained in the Cuckoos' diamond hearts leave them and depart into space for reasons unknown. During their time on Utopia, the Cuckoos begin to experience boredom and start sneaking off the island to buy DVDs of horror films. Influenced by the movies, the girls start mentally torturing their classmates using scenarios from The Twilight Zone and Ring among others. Emma Frost decides to make the Cuckoos teachers for the island's school.

=== Chaos War ===
During the "Chaos War" storyline, Esme and Sophie are among the deceased X-Men members who escape from the underworld. In the aftermath of the defeat of the Chaos King, Sophie is returned to the afterlife after reality is restored by Hercules.

=== Regenesis ===
After the events of "Schism", Phoebe intends to go to Westchester while Irma wants to stay at Utopia. They leave the deciding vote to Celeste, who chooses Utopia after learning that Quentin Quire was going to be at Westchester. Following the death of Charles Xavier and the appearance in the present day of the original five X-Men, the Cuckoos decide to join Cyclops's new iteration of the Xavier School.

=== X-23 ===
The remaining Cuckoos, feeling empty without their sisters, seek out a genetic regeneration specialist who did work at the Facility behind Laura Kinney's genesis. They manipulate Dr. Helen Marks into creating cloned bodies for Sophie and Esme to inhabit. The process is flawed however, as the clone bodies rejected the psychic imprint of their mortal hosts; causing their bodies to deteriorate at an accelerated pace. Esme — carrying an ailing Sophie by her side — demands they go through with an alternative plan: securing the healthy body of an X-23 program subject, Gabby Kinney.

X-23 follows in hot pursuit, but is tricked into chasing the wrong minivan. The Cuckoos use a mental transference device crafted by Dr. Marks to extrapolate and imprint psi-signatures onto healthy bodies with vast recuperative abilities to siphon Esme's mind from her faulty body over to Gabby's body. X-23 interrupts the process, leaving Sophie's consciousness inhabiting her body. Irma boosts the other Cuckoo's psychic powers through herself and Laura, excising Esme from Gabby and suppressing Sophie's consciousness in X-23's body.

=== House of X ===
Professor Xavier, now simply called X, calls upon the Five to resurrect Sophie and Esme.

=== From the Ashes ===
Following the fall of Krakoa, Sophie is enrolled at Empire State University (ESU) and is taking the "Examinations of Post-Krakoan Diaspora" class with Kamala Khan. The other Cuckoos have joined a new iteration of the Quiet Council in New York City.

== Powers and abilities ==
The Cuckoos share a telepathic hive mind. Powerful telepaths individually, their combined power is even greater than its sum. These powers allow them the psychic standards of broadcasting/receiving thoughts, mind control, planting illusions, force blasts of pure psionic energy, astral projection, etc. Their gestalt mind allows them to communicate with one another instantaneously, though the strength of their gestalt depends on their proximity to one another; the further they are from one another, the weaker their ability to connect.

Though they most often function and act as one unit, they are indeed capable of thinking and operating individually. When all five sisters were alive, Sophie was the dominant consciousness and often commanded the Cuckoos. However, as implied by Esme's actions, it is possible for another one of the Cuckoos to wrest control of the gestalt and perhaps even use the powers of all sisters without the consent and knowledge of the others. With the loss of Sophie and Esme, The Cuckoos are not as strong as they were with five.

Like their mother, Emma Frost, each Cuckoo sister also possesses the ability to transform into an organic diamond body, and as such gains invulnerability, durability, and super strength. Unlike Frost, however, their diamond forms are flawless; such that nothing can enter or escape. They demonstrate this ability by sealing the splintered fragment of the Phoenix Force inside their hearts by permanently changing their hearts to diamond, in the process sacrificing their ability to ever feel genuine emotions again. The Phoenix Force eventually manages to escape, potentially allowing the sisters to regain their emotions. During the Warsong series, the Cuckoos gained the power of flight and pyrokinesis, presumably from Phoenix-induced telekinesis.

Additionally, the Cuckoos have demonstrated telekinesis.

=== Personalities ===
==== Sophie Cuckoo ====
Sophie Cuckoo's personality is explored just before her death. She was stated as always being the dominant mind amongst her sisters. When Quentin Quire started a riot on the Xavier Campus, Sophie was "inspired to heroism" and used Kick to strengthen her powers and fight him. The strain killed Sophie, though it was secretly Esme's psychic influence that ultimately pushed her toward death. She has since been portrayed in other realities as the most free-thinking of the Cuckoos.

Down the line of publishing, Sophie shows a more maternal and chivalrous expression of character towards her siblings. Even towards Esme whom had betrayed and killed her twice. Showing she felt extreme amounts of guilt over her siblings actions which nearly cost Laura her own sister due to the deranged Cuckoo's machinations. Sophie is also revealed to be incredibly insightful to the underlying character ticks of her sisters, having guessed Esme hated being a clone; but failed to see her growing to hate her other siblings for which over time as well. Accurately surmising that Esme's psychotic tendencies come from extreme self hatred, in part of feeling like she's less of a person due to being a counterfeit person.

==== Phoebe Cuckoo ====
Phoebe Cuckoo demonstrated a power-hungry personality during the events of Warsong. In contrast to Celeste, who feared the consuming power of the Phoenix, Phoebe desired power out of the sheer affinity for wielding it. She readily embraced the Phoenix and enjoyed the destructive power it gave her.

==== Irma "Mindee" Cuckoo ====
Mindee Cuckoo was the next Cuckoo to be written with a distinct personality. She had a relationship with another student, Germaine, who was killed by an anti-mutant mob when the students were trapped in a building in the aftermath of Xorn's destruction of Manhattan. She then had a combative relationship with Jay Guthrie who was always interrupting her while she played the piano. She later helped Gambit during Exodus's Brotherhood's attack on the school.

Irma has now dyed her hair and cut it short; she is now a brunette. Triage is attracted to her and the feeling might be mutual.

==== Celeste Cuckoo ====
During the events of Warsong, Celeste Cuckoo expressed fears of losing touch with her sisters, changing personalities, and wielding the Phoenix Force. According to Emma, she is the tattletale of the group. She eventually accepted her powers, killing the Thousand-in-One clones and her resurrected sisters per the cosmic judgment of Phoenix. Disgusted by the destruction the Phoenix caused, she tried to expel the Phoenix fragment from her body, but was instead forced to seal it inside Mindee's, Phoebe's, and her own diamond hearts. She is portrayed as the most compassionate of all the Cuckoos.

Upon meeting a teenage Jean Grey who was brought to the present by Beast, Celeste takes an instant dislike towards her and they are constantly bickering. When Irma decides to change her hair style and act more like an individual, Celeste is horrified at the thought of losing her connection to her sister. Much to her despair, Emma welcomes the sisters' growing individuality. Celeste also finds that her sisters both have little problem with Jean, furthering their divide.

==== Esme Cuckoo ====
Esme after leaving her sisters and joining Xorn

Esme Cuckoo was the first to split from her sisters, falling in love with Shi'ar-soldier Stuff who disguised itself as a student. She soon attempts to murder Frost, and was later revealed to be the one responsible for the events that killed Sophie. Wanting to seize control of the Cuckoos but encountering resistance from Sophie, Esme used the drug Kick on herself to augment her own psychic powers and take control of the Stepford Cuckoos' group mind. Esme manipulated her sister Sophie into also using the drug Kick in order to overexert her telepathic powers to the point of death. Esme returned in the Planet X storyline, in which it was revealed that Esme had been working for Xorn the entire time, and that she had developed a crush on him. However, Esme turned on him and tried to destroy his mind after he rejected her affections. Xorn, hopped up on the Sublime contrived drug Hypercortisone D at the time, angrily killed her by smashing her metal earrings through her skull. She dies in Emma's arms, who tells Esme that out of all the Cuckoos, she was most proud of her. In later publishing Esme shows just how cruel, deceitful, power hungry and megalomaniac she can be; the fourth volume of X-23 would reveal the true magnitude of her truly murderous nature; manipulating her living siblings from beyond the grave, murdering and injuring them in order to achieve a desirable outcome for herself and reveling in the newfound invincibility that came with a Wolverine-lite body.

== Conceptual changes ==
In 2022, Grant Morrison addressed widespread rumors that they had intended for the first letter of the five Cuckoos' names (Sophie, Phoebe, Irma, Celeste and Esme) to be an acrostic for "SPICE", as a reference to the British pop group, the Spice Girls. Morrison specified that, two decades after the fact, they no longer remembered whether this had been deliberate.

Regardless of Morrison's intentions, they never mentioned the name of the fifth Cuckoo during their run on New X-Men, and it was only later on that this fifth Cuckoo was named "Mindee" by Chuck Austen. However, writer Matt Fraction later rectified this, stating that Mindee's real first name was "Irma".

They were first called the Stepford Cuckoos in New X-Men #123 (April 2002), which was also the first issue in which Esme was named. Sophie, Phoebe, Celeste, and Mindee were named in New X-Men #134 (January 2003), New X-Men #149 (January 2004), New X-Men #153 (April 2004), and New X-Men #156 (June 2004), respectively. In the New X-Men: Academy X Yearbook, their last name was confirmed as "Cuckoo" and their codename as the "Three-in-One".

== Reception ==
In 2014, Entertainment Weekly ranked The Stepford Cuckoos 28th in their "Let's rank every X-Man ever" list.

== Other versions ==
=== Age of X ===
An alternate universe version of the Stepford Cuckoos from Earth-11326 make minor appearances in X-Men: Legacy #245 as inmates of Fortress X.

=== Exiles ===
An alternate universe version of the Stepford Cuckoos from Earth-91172 appear in the Exiles one-shot Exiles: Days of Then and Now. These versions are among the few remaining superhumans after Earth was devastated by the Annihilation Wave. Additionally, Sophie Cuckoo has detached herself from the two remaining Cuckoos, developed precognitive abilities, and begun dating Quentin Quire.

=== Here Comes Tomorrow ===
An alternate universe version of the Stepford Cuckoos from Earth-15104 appear in "Here Comes Tomorrow". These versions are members of the X-Men 150 years in the future and operate Cerebra.

The House of M Five-in-One Art by Aaron Lopresti.

=== House of M ===
An alternate universe version of the Stepford Cuckoos from Earth-58163 appear in House of M. These versions are part of the New Mutant Leadership Program at the United Nations.

=== X-Men: The End ===
An alternate universe version of the Stepford Cuckoos from Earth-41001 appear in X-Men: The End. These versions are known as the Spikes and possess distinct appearances, with Phoebe having long brown hair, Mindee having long blond hair, and Celeste having short, black hair.

== In other media ==
=== Television ===
The Stepford Cuckoos (Phoebe, Esme and Sophie), portrayed by Skyler Samuels as they appear in The Gifted.

- The Stepford Cuckoos appear in the Wolverine and the X-Men series finale "Foresight", voiced by Tara Strong. These versions are members of the Inner Circle before they are cosmically enhanced as hosts of the Phoenix Force.
- Characters based on the Stepford Cuckoos named the Frost Sisters appear in The Gifted, portrayed by Skyler Samuels. These versions are genetically engineered members of the Hellfire Club. While mounting an escape attempt, Celeste and Mindee died while Sophie and Phoebe were captured by Sentinel Services until Esme eventually frees them in the present.
- The Stepford Cuckoos make a non-speaking appearance in the X-Men '97 episode "A Force to Be Reckoned With".

=== Film ===
Three identical blonde girls make a background appearance in X-Men: The Last Stand. They are seen as students of Xavier's School for Gifted Youngsters; co-writer Zak Penn confirmed that they are the Stepford Cuckoos / Three-in-One.

=== Video games ===
The Stepford Cuckoos appear in X-Men Legends II: Rise of Apocalypse, voiced by Jennifer Hale. These versions are associates of Apocalypse.
