= Nuke (Marvel Comics) =

Fictional character in Marvel Comics

- Nuke as depicted in Daredevil #233 (August 1986). Art by David Mazzucchelli

Publication information
- Publisher: Marvel Comics
- First appearance: Daredevil #232 (July 1986)
- Created by: Frank Miller; David Mazzucchelli

In-story information
- Alter ego: Francis Charles "Frank" Simpson
- Species: Human mutate-cyborg
- Team affiliations: Weapon Plus; Thunderbolts
- Notable aliases: Agent Simpson, Scourge
- Abilities: Cybernetic enhancements grant: Superhuman strength, speed, durability and stamina Second heart Remote-controlled vital functions

Nuke (Francis "Frank" Simpson) is a supervillain appearing in American comic books published by Marvel Comics. Created by writer Frank Miller and artist David Mazzucchelli, the character first appeared in Daredevil #232 (July 1986). Nuke's most distinguishing feature is an American Flag tattooed on his face.

A variation of Nuke named Will Simpson appeared in the first and second seasons of Marvel's Netflix television series, Jessica Jones, portrayed by Wil Traval.

== Publication history ==
Nuke's first appearance, Daredevil #232 (Jul. 1986). Art by David Mazzucchelli

Nuke was created by Frank Miller and David Mazzuchelli. He first appeared in Daredevil #232. Nuke largely disappeared following his apparent death in Daredevil #233, although his origin was explored and touched upon in issues of Captain America and Wolverine. In the series New X-Men, Nuke is retroactively established to have been involved in the Weapon Plus program.

== Fictional character biography ==
=== Early life ===
The disturbed son of a wealthy, abusive, alcoholic, upper-class woman in Ohio, Frank Simpson developed an unhealthy affection for his babysitter, the only real maternal figure in his life. The young woman, who was harboring feelings for Frank's father Charles Simpson, capitalized on Frank's affection and talked the boy into killing his mother. Wolverine, at that time an operative for Weapon Plus, stalks Charles and Frank's babysitter, eventually killing the latter with Charles's gun. After Charles committed suicide, Wolverine abducted Frank for the supersoldier project.

Frank Simpson was sent into the Vietnam War as a black-ops agent and captured by the Viet Cong. Simpson was severely tortured by Logan, shattering his mind. While torturing Simpson, Logan implanted the phrase "No V.C.!" as a trigger word, along with the compulsion to kill gruesomely. He then allowed Simpson to escape and used his conditioning to have him murder a group of peasants. The experiment being a success, Logan was installed as Simpson's handler.

At some time during the war, Nuke was inducted into the final part of the Project Homegrown, a division of Weapon Plus. Nuke was converted into a cyborg with a subdermal mesh that can deflect bullets. Additionally, he was implanted with a second heart that, working in conjunction with placebo pills, controlled his aggression.

=== First appearance ===
Nuke resurfaces employed by Generalissimo Felix Guillermo Carridad of Tierra Verde to destroy a rebel base. Following an operation in Nicaragua, the Kingpin hires Nuke and sends him to kill Daredevil. Nuke launches an attack on Hell's Kitchen, but is defeated by Daredevil. Enraged at a Daily Bugle article reporting on his mass murder in Hell's Kitchen, he escapes his handlers, intending to destroy the Daily Bugle building. He is intercepted by Captain America and shot by a military chopper. He faints from the wound and is presumed dead by the general public.

=== Wolverine: Origins – The Death of Wolverine ===
In the series Wolverine: Origins, following Wolverine's full memories regained, and embarking on a mission to take care of loose ends, the U.S. government dispatches Nuke to hunt Wolverine down. Though Wolverine dispatches Nuke, it is revealed that Nuke's enhanced physiology has left him devoid of any personality or conscience. Wolverine asks Emma Frost to restore Nuke's broken mind, saying that he will euthanize Nuke if he cannot be healed.

During Norman Osborn's tenure as the head of H.A.M.M.E.R., Nuke uses the "Scourge" alias and joins the Thunderbolts. During Osborn's final confrontation, he sustains injuries that render him comatose.

Simpson is allied with the Iron Nail, attacking individuals in Europe that he perceives as enemies of America, until he is stopped by Captain America. He is caught in an explosion and presumed dead. Nuke later appears alive with a shaved head in the Death of Wolverine mini-series. He is seen working for Madame Hydra and hunting Wolverine as part of her bounty.

== Powers and abilities ==
Nuke possesses various superhuman physical attributes as a result of various cybernetic enhancements. Nuke's bones have been replaced with advanced cybernetic components, granting him superhuman strength of an unrevealed limit. Aside from his strength, Nuke's body is considerably more resistant to physical injury than that of an ordinary human, with his skin having been replaced with a durable form of plastic that resembles normal skin. In addition, he has an artificial secondary heart that works in conjunction with his colored pills to keep him under control. In his initial appearance, Nuke was equipped with a multi-barrelled assault rifle.

== Other versions ==
- An alternate timeline version of Nuke appears in the House of M tie-in Civil War: House of M as a government agent. After being tasked with killing Magneto and his followers, he is disassembled by Wanda.
- An alternate timeline version of Nuke appears in What If vol. 2 #48, which depicts Ben Urich pondering a timeline where Daredevil saved Nuke.
- Frank Simpson / Nuke appears in the Ultimate Marvel series Ultimate Comics: Captain America. This version is a soldier who received the Super Soldier Serum during the Vietnam War following Captain America's disappearance. Following the war, Simpson became disillusioned with the U.S. and attempts to sell his enhanced blood to North Korean forces, but is foiled by the British S.A.S. and Captain America. Nonetheless, Simpson escapes, recruits an army, and gives them Super Soldier Serum as well, vowing to make Captain America "see the light". Following a second defeat, Simpson is brought into S.H.I.E.L.D. custody and left bed-ridden.
- A hybridized character based on Nuke and DC Comics character Bane called Bane Simpson appears in the Amalgam Comics story Bruce Wayne: Agent of S.H.I.E.L.D. #1 as a Hydra agent.

== In other media ==
A character loosely based on Nuke named William "Will" Simpson, appears in Jessica Jones, portrayed by Wil Traval. This version is a police sergeant at the NYPD's 15th Precinct who previously served in the 39th Infantry Division. Throughout the first season, he falls under Kilgrave's control, but is eventually freed by Jessica Jones and falls in love with Trish Walker. However, he becomes obsessed with murdering Kilgrave to stop him from hurting anyone else, putting him at odds with Jones. After acquiring experimental pills that increase his combat awareness from the mysterious "IGH" organization, Simpson becomes more manic and kills three of his associates to guarantee that only he can kill Kilgrave. He is eventually defeated by Jones and Walker, with the latter having taken some of his pills, and taken away by IGH. As of the second season, he has begun using an inhaler, spying on Walker, and discovered IGH is targeting Jones before he is attacked and killed by Alisa Campbell.
