= Fantomex =

- Fantomex on the cover of New X-Men #143. Art by Chris Bachalo

Publication information
- Publisher: Marvel Comics
- First appearance: New X-Men #128 (August 2002)
- Created by: Grant Morrison; Igor Kordey

In-story information
- Alter ego: Charlie Cluster-7
- Species: Human mutate/cyborg
- Team affiliations: Weapon Plus Program; X-Force; X-Men
- Notable aliases: Mutant Man of Mystery, Jean-Phillipe Charles, Weapon XIII
- Abilities: Cybernetic mind; Hypnotic illusions; Enhanced reflexes and healing factor; Nano-active blood; External nervous system manifested as techno-organic flying ship; Skilled marksman, acrobat, and hand-to-hand combatant; Formerly: Volga Effect; Self-Power Bestowal; Techno-organic Wings; Superhuman Condition; Energy Manipulation; Psychic force manipulation; Size Enhancement; Accelerating Regeneration

Fantomex is a superhero appearing in American comic books published by Marvel Comics. Created by writer Grant Morrison and artist Igor Kordey, the character first appeared in New X-Men #128 (August 2002). Fantomex is an escaped experiment from the Weapon Plus program. He was designated as Charlie Cluster-7 while growing up in a high-tech facility.

== Development ==
=== Concept and creation ===
Fantomex resembles the titular character of the Italian comic book Diabolik and its film adaptation Danger: Diabolik. The character of Diabolik was in turn loosely based on the character Fantômas, the subject of a series of early-20th century French detective thrillers and a popular Mexican comic book adaptation, who Fantomex is named for. Fantomex's name, Jean-Phillipe, is a reference to actor John Phillip Law, who starred as Diabolik in Danger: Diabolik. In addition, his Weapon X designation—"Weapon XIII"—is a reference to the secret agent protagonist of the Franco-Belgian comic XIII.

=== Publication history ===
Fantomex debuted in New X-Men #128 (August 2002), and was created by Grant Morrison and Igor Kordey.

In July 2013, Marvel announced the character's first solo series, Fantomex MAX, written by Andrew Hope, and illustrated by Shawn Crystal. The series does not take place in current Marvel continuity, and the character is not affiliated with any other Marvel characters. In this series, the character of Fantomex is a more literal take on the Diabolik character, with a storyline less influenced by traditional superhero plots, skewing more towards the concepts of intrigue and adventure. Issue #1 debuted on October 2, 2013.

Fantomex then made sporadic guest appearances with the X-Men until October 2010 when he has a permanent member of the new Uncanny X-Force with Rick Remender and Jerome Opeña as the creative team. This series ran for 35 issues and explored Fantomex's background and developed his character. Fantomex then was added to the short-lived X-Force vol. 4, which lasted 15 issues. Fantomex returned to the X-Men in The Uncanny X-Men vol. 4 in issues #8–18. Fantomex's was added to the roster of the fourth volume of Astonishing X-Men with his apparent death in issue #6 and final appearance in issue #7.

In August 2020, Fantomex returned in Giant-Size X-Men: Fantomex #1, a solo one-shot comic.

== Fictional character biography ==
Fantomex is created by the Weapon Plus program to serve as a Super-Sentinel against Earth's mutant population. Weapon Plus creates a population of technorganic organisms whose living tissue is fused with Sentinel nanotechnology at the cellular level. His mother, a member of this race, becomes pregnant after being fertilized with nanomachines, resulting in the birth of Fantomex. Like the rest of his people, he is born and raised in the World, a man-made environment designed to create super-sentinels, media-friendly mutant-hunters modeled after Saturday morning cartoons. Fantomex claims to have been raised in a virtual version of France with imperfect programming. He develops a French sense of identity and persona; while his experiment designation is Charlie Cluster-7, he usually goes by the name Jean-Phillipe.

During his first appearance, Fantomex seeks a safe haven at the X-Corporation in Paris while fleeing from authorities. He claims to be a mutant thief with the ill-defined power of misdirection. Bleeding profusely from bullet wounds, he asks for asylum, which Professor X grants him. Fantomex explains to Professor X and Jean Grey that he is being hunted because he is one of the most wanted thieves in Europe. Neither Professor X nor Grey are able to verify his claims due to his ceramic mask, which blocks their mental probes. However, they agree to aid him, and after escaping the soldiers who surround the building, Fantomex uses his ship E.V.A. to take Professor X and Grey to his home in France. While there, he introduces them to his mother and continues to describe his success as a thief. He tells the two that he has stolen sensitive information about the Weapon Plus project while in the Channel Tunnel (Chunnel), and offers to sell it to Professor X for $1 billion. After submitting his proposal, Fantomex puts himself in a light hypnotic trance and removes the bullets that riddle his body. Finished, he asks Professor X and Grey to accompany him back to the Chunnel in an effort to destroy Weapon XII.

Fantomex then leads Professor Xavier and Jean Grey to the Chunnel, which is filled with people and animals that Weapon XII has turned into mindless slaves. Knowing that those who have fallen prey to Weapon XII's influence are lost, Fantomex kills Darkstar and all others who are mentally connected to the creature. After Fantomex destroys Weapon XII by using a remote detonator, it is noticed that there are two empty Weapon Plus transport tubes in the Chunnel: one that held the violent Weapon XII and another that held something called Weapon XIII. After the battle, Fantomex's ceramic mask slips slightly, allowing Grey to deduce his true identity as Weapon XIII. Fantomex is revealed to have been in transit in the Chunnel, but escaped and was subsequently chased to the X-Corporation building. Fantomex assures Grey that he refuses to be anyone's soldier. Grey allows Fantomex to disappear into the Chunnel before the authorities arrive.

=== Weapon X and Mystique ===
Later on, Fantomex tries to track down Sublime, the director of Weapon Plus. However, upon examining his empty grave, Fantomex finds a note reading "Roanoke". He locates the secret facility of the splinter program Weapon X and finds it abandoned except for Agent Zero. The pair reluctantly joins forces and travel to the site of Roanoke, a town whose inhabitants were slaughtered after Weapon X unleashed a brainwashed Wolverine on them years earlier. There, the three encounter Sublime but are opposed by his U-Men and forced to flee against overwhelming odds. In an attempt to escape in E.V.A., Fantomex is shot and left for dead.

Fantomex manages to survive. Some time later, he is contacted by the diminutive mutant Shortpack, who seeks his help in assassinating mutant arms dealer Steinbeck in revenge for his killing of an agent under Shortpack's care. Fantomex refuses, not wanting to become responsible for allowing Shortpack to become a killer. Shortpack is captured by Steinbeck soon after, and whilst investigating his disappearance, Mystique learns of his meeting with Fantomex. Though despising him after a past encounter in Madagascar, Mystique finds Fantomex in Monte Carlo, once again operating under the pretense of being a mutant thief, and learns of Shortpack's plan. As she leaves to rescue him, Fantomex follows and uncovers her intent to assassinate Xavier. In exchange for his silence, Fantomex bids Mystique perform a heist for him. After she returns with the stolen goods (a vintage Spider-Man costume), Mystique infects Fantomex and E.V.A. with a techno-organic virus, seemingly killing them both to keep her plan secret. However, it was all a ruse as Mystique knew she was being monitored by Steinbeck's ally Shepard. Fantomex later resurfaces and helps Mystique capture Shepard, giving her access to Steinbeck whom she finally defeats.

=== Dark Reign, Nation X, and Second Coming ===
During the "Dark Reign" event, Norman Osborn attempts to take control of the World and Weapon Plus. Wolverine and Noh-Varr head to the World to try to stop Osborn but are attacked by Weapon Plus creations infected by Allgod (Weapon XVI). Noh-Varr is rescued by Fantomex, and the two of them make their way to the World's brain, where they confront and defeat Allgod. Fantomex uses a shrink ray he stole from Doctor Doom to shrink the World and take it for his own. Fantomex later joins X-Force alongside Wolverine, Archangel, Psylocke, and Deadpool.

=== Uncanny X-Force ===
When Psylocke is captured by the Brotherhood of Mutants, Fantomex sacrifices himself to save her. He is captured and killed when the Skinless Man cuts out his heart. With his connection to E.V.A. severed, she believes herself to be dying as well. E.V.A. survives and evolves into a humanoid form.

After Uncanny X-Force disbands, E.V.A. attempts to resurrect Fantomex via cloning. This results in his three brains being transferred into separate bodies. The evil brain becomes "Weapon XIII", the noble brain becomes "Cluster", a female version of Fantomex; and the mischievous brain is restored to his proper body, retaking the name of Fantomex.

=== X-Force and Uncanny X-Men ===
Cable recruits Fantomex as part of his new X-Force team with the promise that he will help Fantomex find Cluster and Weapon XIII. He proves a questionable ally, as he constantly bickers with Psylocke and has psychic sexual relations with Hope Summers.

He once kissed his X-Force colleague Doctor Nemesis on the lips in thanks for calling him "the best", showing that he is open to same-sex intimacy.

=== Astonishing X-Men ===
In Astonishing X-Men, Fantomex is seemingly reunited with E.V.A after blaming Psylocke for taking E.V.A away from him. Professor X's astral self is trapped by the Shadow King and forced into a game with the X-Men as pawns, but Xavier is able to beat his old enemy by tricking him into bringing Rogue, Mystique, and Fantomex into the astral plane. Fantomex sacrifices his body so that Xavier can return to Earth. Fantomex returns in a self-titled one-shot, released in 2020.

== Powers and abilities ==
Fantomex can create realistic illusions (an ability which he calls "misdirection"). This ability is based on "reality skewing", rather than telepathy or holographic projection.

Fantomex is a skilled hand-to-hand combatant and gunfighter. He once used special ceramic bullets covered in sentient mutant skin that never miss their target.

=== Equipment ===
Fantomex has an external nervous system referred to as E.V.A. that resembles a techno-organic flying saucer. The relationship between E.V.A. and Fantomex is symbiotic, so if E.V.A. experiences pain when she is not within Fantomex, he will feel it as well. Fantomex is mentally linked to E.V.A. and can control her movement. E.V.A. can reshape her body into a variety of forms, fly, and generate energy discharges.

Fantomex's mask incorporates telepathy-blocking ceramics that render him immune to telepathy.

=== Former abilities ===
Fantomex originally had three brains with distinct personas and characteristics that were used for parallel and independent thinking in conjunction with his blood. These three brains allowed him to survive severe head wounds, since his secondary and tertiary brains could take over should one be destroyed. He lost these abilities after being resurrected, with all three brains being placed in separate clone bodies.

Other powers were begotten from an alt. Earth's answer to the Marvel universe's Super Soldier Serum; procured by a dimension-hopping mutant in the coerced service of international weapons trading mogul, Volga. After copying it off a comatose Hope Summers and then forcibly rebooting after taking a fatal gunshot to the head, Charlie rebooted his mind & body upon revival to acclimate to the power without any explosive consequences of the lethal stimulant boost, to simulate any superpower he can envision at will without self-destructing thanks to his cyborg sentinel anatomy.

== Reception ==
Kofi Outlaw of ComicBook.com said Fantomex quickly became a fan favorite character from the X-Men comics. English actor Ed Skrein praised Fantomex and called him one of his favorite characters, expressing interest in portraying him.

In 2014, Entertainment Weekly ranked Fantomex 44th in their "Let's rank every X-Man ever" list.

In 2018, CBR.com ranked Fantomex 5th in their "X-Force: 20 Powerful Members" list.

== Other versions ==
=== Days of Future Now ===
An alternate universe version of Fantomex appears in the Days of Future Now storyline. This version was possessed by Sublime.

=== Here Comes Tomorrow ===
An alternate universe version of E.V.A. appears in the Here Comes Tomorrow storyline. This version assumed a humanoid form after being separated from Fantomex.

== In other media ==
- Fantomex makes a non-speaking cameo appearance in Deadpool's ending in Ultimate Marvel vs. Capcom 3.
- Fantomex appears as a playable character in Marvel: Avengers Alliance.
- Fantomex appears as a playable character in Marvel: Future Fight.
- Fantomex appears as a playable character in Marvel Strike Force.
- Fantomex appears in Marvel Snap.

== Collected editions ==
Title	Material Collected	Published Date	ISBN
Fantomex Max	Fantomex Max #1-5	March 26, 2014	978-0785153900
Giant-Size X-Men By Jonathan Hickman	Giant-Size X-Men: Fantomex and Giant-Size X-Men: Jean Grey and Emma Frost, Nightcrawler, Magneto.	January 26, 2021	978-1302925833
