= E Is for Extinction =

Marvel Comics storyline

"E is for Extinction"
- Cover of New X-Men: E is for Extinction (2001), trade paperback collected edition, art by Frank Quitely
- Publisher: Marvel Comics
- Publication date: July – September 2001
- Genre: Superhero
- Title(s): New X-Men #114–116
- Main characters: List of X-Men members

Creative team
- Writer: Grant Morrison
- Penciller: Frank Quitely
- Inker(s): Tim Townsend; Dan Green; Mark Morales
- Letterer(s): Comicraft; Richard Starkings
- Colorist: Brian Haberlin
- E is for Extinction: ISBN 0-7851-0811-4

"E is for Extinction" was the first story arc from Grant Morrison's run on the Marvel Comics title New X-Men. The story was published in New X-Men #114–116 in 2001 (formerly titled X-Men, the series was renamed New X-Men at the request of Morrison, but retained its original numbering). The storyline began Morrison's revamp of the X-Men franchise, introducing a new status quo for the X-Men and the mutant community of the Marvel Universe as a whole.

== Plot ==
As a new generation of mutants begins maturing across the globe, a long-lost Master Mold A.I. and Sentinel production facility in the jungles of Ecuador is uncovered by a mysterious woman called Cassandra Nova. She uses Donald Trask, nephew of Bolivar Trask, to gain control of the wild sentinels and has the man order the Sentinels to massacre the entire population of the mutant nation of Genosha. However, Nova's presence shows up on the newly created mutant detection machine Cerebra, created by Beast, leading to Cyclops and Wolverine finding Nova and defeating her. However, the X-Men are unable to stop the Sentinels from massacring the residents of Genosha.

As the X-Men search the rubble, they find former X-Men villain and teacher Emma Frost as one of the survivors, having survived the Sentinel onslaught thanks to her body undergoing a new secondary mutation. At the X-Mansion, Beast investigates the biological origins of the powerful enemy they have just captured, while also revealing the possibility of mankind's genetic extinction within the next few generations. When Cassandra Nova suddenly overcomes her imprisonment and effortlessly makes her way to Cerebra (in order to take over Charles Xavier's mind), Frost appears and snaps her neck. However, Nova swaps bodies with Xavier and shoots him to keep him from revealing what has just happened.

Days pass; Jean Grey and Cyclops reflect upon the marital problems that have popped up due to Cyclops's post-traumatic stress disorder (brought on by Apocalypse possessing Cyclops's body for over a year) when they turn on the TV and see "Xavier" out himself as a mutant on live television.

== Reception ==
Grant Morrison's arrival on the X-Men franchise as the new writer of New X-Men was highly anticipated and featured amongst other things, massive changes for the X-Men franchise. Among which were new designs for the X-Men, where the group abandoned their traditional spandex costumes for leather jackets and conservative turtle-neck sweaters. Additionally, Wolverine and Beast underwent massive visual changes as well, Beast becoming more beast-like than man and Wolverine abandoning his old costume for a new casual look. While the former was and remains controversial with fans (being one of the few elements of the Morrison run not to be reversed upon their departure from the book), Wolverine's new civilian garb (designed to cash in on the success of the X-Men live action film) was warmly received by fans.

This story also led to the introduction of Cassandra Nova (Professor Xavier's previously unseen twin sister, who escaped from the womb via miscarriage after the two siblings engaged in psychic combat against each other). Nova would ultimately be named "Villain of the Year" by Wizard Magazine for the year 2001, for the genocide inflicted against the people of Genosha.

== Secondary mutation ==
One of the major aspects introduced in the storyline was the official canonization of the concept of "secondary mutations". The term refers to mutants who possess multiple powers, a longstanding tradition of the X-Men books that had never been officially addressed by writers. The concept was mainly incorporated by Morrison to provide Emma Frost new diamond skin powers, allowing her to serve as a replacement for the recently deceased Colossus.

== Collected editions ==
A trade paperback of the storyline was released in 2001; the initial printing of the trade paperback included New X-Men #117 (which served as a bridge issue between "E is for Extinction" and the next multi-part storyline "Germ Free Generation") and the "Morrison Manifesto", a detailed account of Grant Morrison's proposal for their plans as writer for the X-Men.

The initial paperback did not have "New X-Men Annual 2001", which was omitted due to issues involving how to reprint the story, which was published in the sideways "Widescreen" format. As the issue contained the set-up for a key number of future major plotlines for the Morrison X-Men run, later printings of the trade paperback removed the "Morrison Manifesto" and replaced it with the annual, which was published in the standard comic format, though still sideways.

The storyline has also been included in other volumes collecting wider storylines:

- New X-Men Omnibus (collects New X-Men #114–154 and Annual 2001, 992 pages, December 2006 ISBN 0-7851-2326-1)
- New X-Men by Grant Morrison Ultimate Collection: Volume 1 (collects New X-Men #114–126, and Annual 2001, 376 pages, May 2008, ISBN 0-7851-3251-1)

== Secret Wars (2015) ==
The "Secret Wars" storyline features a new "E is for Extinction" miniseries that is part of the event. Its domain on Battleworld is Mutopia.

== In other media ==
Elements of "E Is for Extinction" are incorporated into the X-Men '97 episode "Remember It", where Bastion sends Sentinels to destroy Genosha.
