= X-Men: Schism =

Marvel Comics storyline

- Cyclops and Wolverine fighting on the cover of X-Men: Schism #4 (September 2011); Art by Alan Davis, Mark Farmer and Javier Rodriguez

Publication information
- Publisher: Marvel Comics
- Genre: Superhero; Crossover
- Publication date: July 2011
- No. of issues: 1-5
- Main character(s): X-Men; Hellfire Club; Quentin Quire; Sentinel

Creative team
- Written by: Jason Aaron
- Artist(s): Carlos Pacheco; Frank Cho; Daniel Acuña; Alan Davis; Adam Kubert

Collected editions
- X-Men: Schism: ISBN 9780785156888

"X-Men: Schism" is a 2011 crossover comic book storyline published by Marvel Comics featuring the X-Men, consisting of a five-issue miniseries written by Jason Aaron and illustrated by Carlos Pacheco (issue #1), Frank Cho (issue #2), Daniel Acuña (issue #3), Alan Davis (issue #4) and Adam Kubert (issue #5).

The storyline was preceded by a four-issue prologue miniseries by writer Paul Jenkins and artists Roberto De La Torre (issue #1), Andrea Mutti (issue #2), Will Conrad (issue #3) and Clay Mann (issue #4), and two tie-in issues of the Generation Hope comic book, written by Kieron Gillen and illustrated by Tim Seeley. A one-shot comic book, "X-Men: Regenesis", written by Gillen and illustrated by Billy Tan, served as an epilogue to the storyline.

"Schism" was first announced by senior editor Nick Lowe at a press call on March 4, 2011. The event deals with a series of strong disagreements between Cyclops and Wolverine over decisions taken throughout the storyline, leading to a schism between the X-Men. "Schism" brought big repercussions towards the X-Men franchise, including the end (and later relaunching) of long-running Uncanny X-Men comic book and a "definite split" among the X-Men, leading to a new status quo presented in the X-Men: Regenesis storyline, which establishes both sides of the schism.

== Plot ==
After Cyclops delivers a speech to the United Nations asking for all Sentinel programmers around the world to be decommissioned, the UN Building is attacked twice; once telepathically by Quentin Quire, and then by a small troop of Sentinels. The party responsible for this is 12-year-old prodigy Kade Kilgore, who had infiltrated Utopia to release Quire and used the time while the UN was being attacked to kill his father and usurp his position as CEO; as a result for these actions, the Hellfire Club welcomes him as their new Black King.

As a result of the attack on the UN, several countries begin to mobilize their Sentinels; however, the Sentinels start attacking everyone, not only mutants. Cyclops sends most of the X-Men around the world to fight the Sentinels; meanwhile, Emma Frost, Namor, Magneto, Iceman and Colossus take the young mutants to the opening of the Mutant History Museum in San Francisco. Wolverine is displeased when Cyclops decides not to deliver Quire to the authorities for his doings.

Kilgore and the new Inner Circle of the Hellfire Club, composed exclusively by youngsters of considerable wealth and power, lead an assault on the Museum of Mutant History, using Badoon Brain Slugs to take down the X-Men at the museum. As Cyclops and Wolverine both manage to telepathically contact Oya, who was present at the museum, and she asks them what to do, Wolverine tells her to get out, while Cyclops tells her to "do what she has to do". She ends up killing the Hellfire Club soldiers and saving the X-Men and the civilians in the building, making Wolverine become even more displeased with Cyclops for not ordering Oya not to kill.

However, the new Hellfire Club activates a special giant Sentinel, sent towards Utopia. With most of the X-Men far from Utopia and part of the team being in the med-lab, young mutant messiah Hope Summers and other teenage mutants volunteer to join Cyclops in the fight against the super Sentinel. Wolverine is opposed to the idea of putting children on the front lines against the Sentinel; when Cyclops insists that everyone who wants to fight should fight, Wolverine gets a detonator and threatens to blow up Utopia in order to make the youngsters run away from the island and destroy the super Sentinel. Cyclops and Wolverine's frustration with each other come to a head when Cyclops brings up Jean Grey saying that she never loved Wolverine and was always frightened of him. Wolverine replies "And if she were here right now, who do you think she would be more frightened of?" The two fight each other in a rage while being attacked by the sentinel, with Wolverine appearing to gain the upper hand.

Eventually, the super Sentinel threat forces them to stop fighting each other and join Hope and the other young mutants in the battle against the Sentinel, and the Sentinel is finally taken down. But the ideological differences between Cyclops and Wolverine reaches a breaking point, and Wolverine decide to leave Utopia and bring along whoever wants to come with him. He promises not to intervene with what Cyclops is doing in Utopia here as long as he promises to do the same. Both men eventually start recruiting their teammates; some members of the X-Men leave with Wolverine to start fresh in Westchester, while part of the team stays in Utopia with Cyclops.

== Titles involved ==
=== Prologue ===
- X-Men: Prelude to Schism #1-4

=== Core miniseries ===
- X-Men: Schism #1-5

=== Tie-ins ===
- Generation Hope #10-12

=== Epilogue ===
- X-Men: Regenesis #1 (one-shot)

== Reading order ==
May 2011

- X-Men: Prelude to Schism #1
- X-Men: Prelude to Schism #2

June 2011

- X-Men: Prelude to Schism #3
- X-Men: Prelude to Schism #4

July 2011

- X-Men: Schism #1
- X-Men: Schism #2

August 2011

- X-Men: Schism #3
- Generation Hope #10

September 2011

- X-Men: Schism #4 (up until page 11)
- Generation Hope #11
- X-Men: Schism #4 (from after page 11)

October 2011

- X-Men: Schism #5
- Generation Hope #12

== Collected editions ==
| Title | Material collected | Published date | ISBN |
|---|---|---|---|
| X-Men: Prelude to Schism | X-Men: Prelude to Schism #1-4 | September 2011 | 978-0785156895 |
| X-Men: Schism | X-Men: Schism #1-5, X-Men: Regenesis #1 | July 2012 | 978-0785156888 |
| Generation Hope: Schism | Generation Hope #6-12 | January 2012 | 978-0785152422 |
