= U-Men (comics) =

Fictional comic book group

Publication information
- Publisher: Marvel Comics
- First appearance: New X-Men Annual 2001 (September 2001)
- Created by: Grant Morrison; Leinil Francis Yu

In-story information
- Member(s): Sublime

The U-Men are a group of supervillains appearing in American comic books published by Marvel Comics. They are depicted usually as adversaries of the X-Men.

== Publication history ==
The U-Men first appeared in New X-Men Annual 2001 (September 2001) in Grant Morrison's run on X-Men. They were created by Morrison and artist Leinil Francis Yu.

== Fictional history ==
A group of U-Men track down a young girl named Angel Salvadore, who manifested insect-like mutant powers. They are about to dissect her in a mobile-lab by the side of the road when Wolverine finds them and attacks, having been searching for Angel with the help of Jean Grey. All the soldiers are killed and Angel is taken into the care of the X-Men.

Some time after Angel is rescued, a squadron of U-Men attack through the front gate of the X-Mansion. Jean Grey is the only X-Man on the premises, but with the help of several of the students, she keeps the U-Men at bay. The U-Men have many counter-abilities to mutant powers, such as being able to shut down portions of their mind to escape telepathic control by the Stepford Cuckoos. However, Grey manages to defeat the U-Men with her regrowing Phoenix powers. The U-Men flee after Grey destroys their suits.

The U-Men are next seen when Xorn takes his remedial class, which includes Angel, on a camping trip. They are attacked by U-Men forces. Xorn is drawn away, leaving the class to face down a lone U-Men soldier. The students defeat the U-Man while Angel discovers that Xorn had killed the rest of the force.

== "The Third Species" religion ==
The U-Men are primarily led by Sublime. Individuals view his book, The Third Species, to be their bible and the practice of being a U-Man as a legitimate religion, though others, such as mutants, view them as a cult.

=== U-Man life and philosophy ===
The Third Species presents Sublime's philosophy that the current world is "tainted" and that followers must not be exposed to the air or touch the earth of the "fallen world" until it has been perfected. Members of the U-Men wear special suits and only eat processed, specialized foods that are deemed "clean".

Sublime's book states that there is a "third species" on Earth called Homo perfectus or "the Recycled Man". The so-called "Third Species" is composed of normal humans who believe it is their right to use mutants and mutant parts to give themselves "chosen mutant" abilities. They do this by capturing mutants and harvesting their body parts to use as grafts and implants. The U-Men also dissected Martha Johansson, a mutant with psychic powers, then preserved her brain for their own means. Like normal grafts and implants, the mutant organs do not always take, and some U-Men die as a result of the process. U-Men view the failure of a graft to take as a measure of an individual's "purity" and deservedness to be one of the Third Species.

When a U-Man dies, the other members of their team harvest the deceased U-Man's grafted mutant organs for themselves. In doing so, they believe that the fallen U-Man (as well as the mutants whose organs they harvest) will continue to live within them.

== Other versions ==
In the alternate future presented in the storyline Here Comes Tomorrow, the last U-Man is known as Apollyon the Destroyer, who serves as a herald for the Sublime-possessed Beast. Having suffered several injuries and being "perfected" with different grafts, Apollyon awaits the day when he will be grafted with the "Phoenix gene" and will become perfect. However, when the Phoenix gene is harvested, Apollyon discovers that Beast lied to him and intends to harvest the Phoenix gene for himself. When Jean Grey extracts Sublime from Beast, Apollyon kills Beast out of vengeance. Delusional and believing the world to now be perfected, Apollyon rips off his mask, revealing that his face is disfigured. Despite this, E.V.A. recognizes him and calls out, suggesting that Apollyon is actually Fantomex.

== In other media ==
=== Television ===
The U-Men appear in Marvel Anime: X-Men. This version is a murderous human supremacist group led by Sublime and backed by Mastermind.

=== Video games ===
The U-Men appear in X-Men: Destiny.
