= Weapon Plus =

Fictional comic book program

Weapon Plus Program

Publication information
- Publisher: Marvel Comics
- First appearance: New X-Men #128 (Aug. 2002)
- Created by: Grant Morrison; Igor Kordey

In-story information
- Type of organization: Secret governmental genetics program
- Base(s): Various
- Leader(s): John Sublime
- Agent(s): Professor Thorton; Notable test subjects and creations Weapon I - Captain America, Isaiah Bradley, Protocide; Weapon II - Wolverteeny; Weapon III - Skinless Man; Weapon IV - Man-Thing; Weapon V - Project V-Nam; Weapon VI - Power Man; Weapon VII - Nuke; Weapon VIII - Unknown; Weapon IX - Typhoid Mary; Weapon X - Wolverine; Weapon XI - Unknown; Weapon XII - Huntsman; Weapon XIII - Fantomex; Weapon XIV - Stepford Cuckoos; Weapon XV - Ultimaton; Weapon XVI - Allgod; Weapon Infinity - Deathlok; Project: Troubleshooter - American Kaiju; Weapon H - H-Alpha; Weapon XXX; Hellfire Program - Hellverine, Destroyers

Weapon Plus is a fictional clandestine program appearing in American comic books published by Marvel Comics. It was created by Grant Morrison during their run in New X-Men. The program's purpose is the creation of super soldiers intended to fight the wars of the future, especially a mutant-human war. Weapon X, the organization's most well-known program, was originally the tenth installation, but eventually it branched off and became an independent program with similar purposes. Morrison's introduction of Weapon Plus also shed new information about the origins of Weapon X, Captain America, and other Marvel Comics super soldiers.

== Fictional team history ==
During the 1940s, the existence of mutants was not yet known to the general public. A few individuals were aware of the coming of mutants and the fact that they had the potential to replace baseline humans as the dominant species of Earth. Weapon Plus was created to address the so-called mutant problem. What was unknown by everyone involved in Weapon Plus is that its mastermind, Sublime, was a sentient bacteria present in every living creature on the planet, save for mutants, who were genetically immune to the Sublime infection.

== Programs ==
=== Before Weapon I ===
Project: Rebirth began as a collaboration between American, British and German eugenicists led by Josef Reinstein (later known as Abraham Erskine) and Koch. When World War II began, Koch took over the German program, and Reinstein moved to the American program.

=== Weapon I ===
Project: Rebirth, headed by Abraham Erskine, managed to produce Captain America (Steve Rogers). However, Erskine was murdered moments after Rogers was successfully enhanced. The refinements he introduced which made the process successful were lost with his death. Following Erskine's death, Koch took over the American program. Early attempts to recreate the formula resulted in African American super soldiers (most prominently Isaiah Bradley and his son Josiah X). Three hundred African-American soldiers were taken from Camp Cathcart and subjected to potentially fatal experiments at an undisclosed location.

=== Weapon II ===
Weapon II experimented on animals. It was implied by Grant Morrison that these animal weapons were the animal cyborgs in the comic We3, not published by Marvel.

Weapon II was later introduced as part of a group of semi-animal characters including Howard the Duck, Squirrel Girl, Beast, and Rocket Raccoon. He appeared as Wolverteeny, a squirrel with Wolverine's "Adamantium skeleton, claws, intelligence, and healing factor".

=== Weapon III ===
Weapon III (Harry Pizer) was a mutant with elastic multi-sensory skin. Originally a barrister, he was recruited by Weapon Plus to help protect his nation from the approaching Cold War. His skin's durability and elasticity was enhanced. Pizer was sent to Otherworld to retrieve the Orb of Necromancy. However, he was stopped by Fantomex and, for the many deaths he caused, subsequently punished by the Captain Britain Corps and flayed alive, his skin machined off and used to create sentient bullets. Pizer survived and trained to have his muscles function in a similar manner to his skin. Seeking revenge, Pizer murders Fantomex by ripping out his heart. He is later killed in retaliation by Deadpool.

=== Weapon IV ===
Weapon IV, was said to be employed on various criminals that were ethnic minorities as test subjects. However, Weapon IV is actually 'Project Sulfur' - the project spearheaded by Ted Sallis, whose research led him to become the Man-Thing.

=== Weapon V ===
During the Vietnam War, then S.H.I.E.L.D sponsored program under the pseudonym of Sym-soldier used pieces of the symbiote Grendel and bonded them to various able bodied operatives to fight in the conflict. However, the program was shut down after the specimens were driven mad by their second skins. When the government got hold of the Venom symbiote, they decided to use it as part of Weapon V under the name of Project Rebirth 2.0 to create a new soldier with symbiote augmentation. They bonded the suit to former veteran Flash Thompson, creating Agent Venom.

=== Weapon VI ===
Weapon VI was led by Dr. Noah Burstein and was responsible for giving Luke Cage his powers.

=== Weapon VII ===
Weapon VII, a.k.a. Project: Homegrown, experimented on human soldiers during the Vietnam War. The only known successful subject of Project: Homegrown was Nuke, who had armored implants under his epidermis and was addicted to powerful narcotics. Logan, who would later become one of Weapon Plus' victims, kidnapped Nuke as a child and oversaw his conditioning.

=== Weapon VIII ===
Weapons VIII experimented on criminals and psychopaths.

=== Weapon IX ===
Weapon IX (according to artist Rob Liefeld) was originally supposed to be Wade Wilson, a.k.a. Deadpool. Weapon IX is later revealed to be project 'Psyche' (Typhoid Mary).

=== Weapon XI ===
No character under the official title of Weapon XI has been revealed. However; according to artist Rob Liefeld, Weapon XI was originally intended to be Garrison Kane, who went on to be better known as simply Kane, or confusingly Weapon X.

=== Weapon XII ===
Weapon Plus created Weapon XII (a.k.a. Huntsman, real name Zona Cluster 6) at the England-based facilities of The World. He was the first living weapon created employing artificial evolution and nanosentinel technology. Weapon XII was eliminated by Fantomex with the aid of Jean Grey and Professor X. Huntsman was created to be part of the Super-Sentinels, a mutant-hunting team of superheroes with a base in a Weapon Plus space station. This team, a brainchild of Sublime, was intended to be a publicity stunt to make the genocide of mutants much more acceptable to the public.

=== Weapon XVI ===
Weapon XVI, a.k.a. Allgod, is a "living religion", a virus that "attacks the faith reserves". People infected by Allgod worship the World, and become fanatically devoted slaves to it. Wolverine, Fantomex, and Noh-Varr team up to shut down the World (which has now become sentient), its weapons production, and Allgod along with it.

=== Weapon Infinity ===
Weapon Infinity, also known as Project: Deathlok, is the cyborg conversion of both ordinary citizens and then all superheroes in the future. The first steps were the reanimation of military corpses, then the wholesale conversion of dead bodies into "Deathloks", modelled after the hero of the same name. The Deathloks were then used to hunt down and convert all heroes of the future. Project: Deathlok was first seen in Dark Reign, and later fleshed out in the final arc of Wolverine: Weapon X. Uncanny X-Force has since elaborated on the project, revealing it to be Weapon Infinity during the 'Deathlok Nation' arc.

=== Weapon Minus ===
A number of scientists were funded by S.H.I.E.L.D. to counteract the Weapon Plus program in case it went rogue. One of these scientists was forced to test the resultant mixture of Super-Soldier Serum and LSD on himself after his funding and materials were cut, gaining the ability to create miniature mind-universes that could trap almost anyone.

=== Project: Troubleshooter ===
Project: Troubleshooter was run by Robert Maverick and used pre-existing substances to create a new super-soldier. They used gamma radiation, Mutant Growth Hormone, Pym Particles, and the Lizard formula to transform U.S. Army Corporal Todd Ziller into American Kaiju.

=== Weapon XXX ===
This continuation of the Weapon Plus program was still a work in progress, headed up by its mysterious new head, Dr. Billy Jungers. An adroit Captain America radicalist who'd inherited the morally bankrupt mission of the initiative. The project itself was still in the experimental phase, a massive vat containing a creature, the presumed 30th weapon behind the overseer, who observed Logan and Rogers from afar as they visited one of his facilities to find out what Plus was up to and how it related to their heroic origins.

== The World ==
The World is a secret lab owned by Weapon Plus, in which the program scientists intend to create superior humans employing eugenics, nanotechnology and artificial evolution technology. Time is "artificial" at the World and it can be frozen or altered in any way desired.

The most promising individuals in each generation are selected while the others are terminated. Also natural selection in the form of the survival of the fittest is possible by exposing the population to different forms of selective pressure. This way, new breeds of superhumans can be evolved within a few months, instead of hundreds or thousands of years. Half a million years inside The World represents only eighteen months on the outside.

The World's facilities contain a population (with its own religion, history and culture) that is led to believe that beyond the World's limits there's nothing, other than endless rock and mutants who are coming to destroy them. Those who are selected for termination believe there is a reward awaiting them at the other side. The World is also filled with numerous experiments and prototypes of Weapon Plus, such as techno-organic human-animal car-cops.

== In other media ==
- Weapon X appears in the X-Men film series. This version is headed by William Stryker and based in Alkali Lake, Alberta.
- Project Rebirth appears in Captain America: The First Avenger.
- Weapons Plus appears in The Incredible Hulk. This version is responsible for fabricating a modified version of the Super Serum formula, which is provided to Emil Blonsky by Thaddeus Ross.
- Project Deathlok appears in Agents of S.H.I.E.L.D. This version is a covert initiative led by Hydra and Cybertek to build cybernetic soldiers.

== Collected editions ==
Title	Material Collected	Published Date	ISBN
Weapon Plus: Man-Slaughter	Absolute Carnage: Weapon Plus, Weapon Plus: World War IV, and Wolverine & Captain America: Weapon Plus	October 29, 2020	978-1302925826
