= Quentin Quire =

Marvel Comics character

Quintavius Quirinius "Quentin" Quire Kid Omega
- Kid Omega; Art by Russell Dauterman

Publication information
- Publisher: Marvel Comics
- First appearance: New X-Men #134 (Jan. 2003)
- Created by: Grant Morrison; Frank Quitely

In-story information
- Full name: Quintavius Quirinius "Quentin" Quire
- Species: Human mutant
- Team affiliations: Omega Gang; Xavier Institute; Generation X West Coast Avengers; X-Force; X-Men
- Partnerships: Wolverine
- Notable aliases: Kid Omega; Phoenix
- Abilities: Telepathy; Telekinesis; Genius-level intellect

Quintavius Quirinius "Quentin" Quire, also known as Kid Omega, is a fictional character appearing in American comic books published by Marvel Comics, usually in those featuring the X-Men. Quire first appeared in New X-Men #134 (January 2003). He was created by writer Grant Morrison and artist Frank Quitely.

Quentin Quire is an Omega-level mutant with substantial telepathic and telekinetic abilities, often manifesting as pink psionic hard-light constructs such as shotguns and motorcycles. He is initially a student of Xavier Institute, but is disillusioned with the views of the X-Men. He later joins superhero teams such as the West Coast Avengers, X-Force, and X-Men.

A character inspired by Quire and credited as "Kid Omega" appears in the 2006 film X-Men: The Last Stand, portrayed by Ken Leung.

== Publication history ==
Quentin Quire made his first appearance in New X-Men #134 (Jan. 2003). His first appearance as Kid Omega and the first appearance of the Omega Gang were in New X-Men #135 (Feb. 2003). Grant Morrison has cited The Sekhmet Hypothesis as an influence on the story as well as Quire's angry punk rock aesthetic, referring to it in their book, Supergods.

Quentin appeared in multiple other X-Men titles as a student such as Wolverine and the X-Men and Generation X (Vol. 2), alongside frequent appearances in other related titles. He would also appear as a superhero in titles such as West Coast Avengers (Vol. 3), X-Force (Vol. 6), and X-Men (Vol. 7).

== Fictional character biography ==
=== Xavier Institute ===
Quentin Quire joined the student body of the Xavier Institute after Professor X's return and the rebuilding of the X-Mansion. He immediately stood out due to his brilliant intellect and quickly became Xavier's prize pupil, with Xavier guiding him on the use of his powers.

=== Omega Gang: New X-Men ===
On his birthday, Quire receives a call from his parents telling him he is adopted, which seems to destabilize him. Quire becomes strongly opposed to a policy of tolerance with humans, seeking to avenge the death of mutant fashion designer Jumbo Carnation. Quire and the Omega Gang incite a riot among the students, but are thwarted by the X-Men. The altercation is ended by Sophie Cuckoo and the Stepford Cuckoos. They confront Quire, who confesses that his motivation for the ordeal was to impress Sophie Cuckoo, to whom he is attracted. The Cuckoos defeat Quire, but Sophie is killed in the process. Quire's body is burnt out by his own psionic energy, causing him to leave the physical plane of existence.

=== "A Higher Plane of Existence" ===
Quire remains in a dormant semi-alive energy form in a containment unit. During X-Men: Phoenix – Endsong, a fragment of the Phoenix Force returns to Earth and investigates Quire, who regains consciousness and reconstitutes his body. He seeks out and attempts to reanimate Sophie Cuckoo, but is unable to complete the process, so he sets off to find the Phoenix Force. Quire finds the Phoenix, contained within Emma Frost, and releases it. The Phoenix resurrects Sophie, who is disgusted by Quire and chooses to die again. Having spent too much of his energy, Quire apologizes to the X-Men for his rash behavior before returning to his non-corporeal state. Finding life on a higher plane "boring," Quire resurrects himself and attempts to destroy Utopia, claiming that the X-Men stole his idea to create a mutant nation.

=== Wolverine and the X-Men ===
Quentin Quire was shown in promotional art for Wolverine and the X-Men #1 as a member of Wolverine's post-Schism team. However, he defects alongside other students to the Hellfire Academy, hoping to discover why Oya switched sides. Quire graduates and becomes a graduate student/assistant at the Jean Grey school.

Due to his anger towards Wolverine and others, Quire leaves school to join the Phoenix Corporation, becoming the White King of the Hellfire Club. However, he finds himself unable to enjoy the riches and fame brought by the group after learning of his future death while time traveling. The events of AXIS and Wolverine's death causes Quire to return to the Jean Grey School.

=== "The Phoenix" ===
Having become fed up with people, Quire exiles himself from society and lives in the middle of the Atlantic Ocean with Krakoa. He is recruited by Thor to combat the Shi'ar gods, who have conjured the Phoenix Force to have it lay waste to all of reality. Quire psychically attacks the Phoenix, allowing Thor to access the White Hot Room and fight it. Quire enters the White Hot Room himself and negotiates with the Phoenix, which allows him to absorb a small portion of its power. After the Shi'ar gods are imprisoned, Quire becomes the new god of the Shi'ar as the Phoenix. However, Quire returns to Earth and resumes his self-imposed exile on Krakoa. When M attempts to kill Jubilee, Quire sacrifices his Phoenix power to cure Jubilee's vampirism and restore her mutant powers.

=== Marvel Legacy ===
Quire joins the West Coast Avengers, under the leadership of Clint Barton and Kate Bishop. He also has an awkward romance with Gwenpool.

=== Krakoa and From the Ashes ===
Kid Omega joins Krakoa after it is established as a mutant nation, joining X-Force. He is killed and resurrected multiple times on Krakoa, and had a relationship with Phoebe Cuckoo, but she broke up with him. In a battle with Cerebrax, Quire is apparently destroyed and his mind wiped from the Krakoan files. He later appears alive, revealing that he had merged with Cerebrax. After Krakoa leaves for another dimension, Quire joins Cyclops's X-Men team.

== Powers and abilities ==
Quentin Quire is an Omega-level mutant with advanced telekinetic and telepathic abilities that enable him to organize and construct his thoughts at accelerated rates, overtly or covertly manipulate the minds of others, resist mind probes, and disable other forms of psychic manipulation. His level of psychic influence on others depends on the number of individuals he wishes to affect — his influence is strongest among fewer individuals and subtler in large numbers of people. Quire is able to manifest and use a "psychic shotgun", as well as other weapons and objects, much in the same way other psychic mutants (such as Psylocke) can manifest swords with their minds. He has also been shown to create an entire universe, which he calls "The Construct", within his mind, allowing him to imprison others within this world.

Quire has existed without a body as a form of energy inside a jar. He is also depicted as being an alternate reality host of the Phoenix Force in the White Hot Room, suggesting that he can potentially be a host to the Phoenix. Quire is apparently destined to become a Phoenix avatar in more than one reality as further revealed by the Battle of the Atom storyline, where an alternate future version of Quire is a member of the future X-Men as well as a Phoenix avatar.

Quire has also been shown to be able to psychically project his consciousness while sleeping to speak with other telepaths and in dire situations escape death, as well as being able to transfer the energy of his consciousness into different organically made "shells".

== Omega Gang ==
Omega Gang
- Omega Gang symbol

Publication information
- Publisher: Marvel Comics
- First appearance: New X-Men #135
- Created by: Grant Morrison; Frank Quitely

In-story information
- Base(s): Xavier Institute
- Member(s): Glob Herman; Kid Omega; Radian; Redneck; Tattoo

The Omega Gang is a group of teenage mutants and enemies of the X-Men. Created by comics writer Grant Morrison, the gang first appears in New X-Men #135 but is not named until New X-Men #140, when Lucas Bishop asks to interview them.

The Omega Gang is formed by Quentin Quire, who became depressed because of an unrequited crush on Sophie of the Stepford Cuckoos; his unpopular status among the Institute students; and especially the revelation that he was adopted, which shatters his already fragile self-esteem. The death of mutant fashion designer Jumbo Carnation prompts Quire to gather a small group of students to exact revenge on Carnation's murderers.

At Quire's request, all members tattoo themselves with a symbol formed by an Omega with an X below it and dress up with red-and-black striped shirts, jeans and whips. This is an outfit designed by Carnation himself and based on an illustration from an anti-mutant article written by Bolivar Trask many years ago, which portrayed mutants enslaving the human race. The Omega Gang members also consume the drug Kick in order to boost their powers. Unbeknownst to them, the drug is derived from the sentient bacteria Sublime, which seeks to increase the violence between mutants and baseline humans. The gang is responsible for the attack on a teenage anti-mutant gang and later for the Open Day Riots, with Sophie Cuckoo being killed during the riot.

== Other versions ==
=== Age of Apocalypse ===
An alternate universe version of Quentin Quire appears in Age of Apocalypse. This version was rejected by the Shadow King, who found that he was unstable and had mild telepathic abilities that were not considered useful. Quire went on to found the Overmind, a pyramid scheme, after allying with other mutant telepaths. Quire uses the Overmind's members to increase his own powers.

=== Exiles ===
An alternate universe version of Quentin Quire appears in Exiles: Days of Then and Now. This version is among the few remaining heroes after the Annihilation Wave devastated Earth.

=== House of M ===
An alternate universe version of Quentin Quire appears in "House of M". This version is a student of the New Mutant Leadership Institute. After Quire confronts Wallflower and boasts that no one can stop him, Wallflower uses her pheromones to fill him with self-loathing, forcing him to commit suicide.

=== Post-Graduation ===
An adult Quire is now host to the Phoenix Force. He returns to the now defunct Jean Grey School for Higher Learning to confront his nemesis, Wolverine. Wolverine is confronted with Quire's newest surprise: two million Negative Zone mutants in need of schooling. However, Logan relishes his newfound role as teacher and welcomes them in.

=== Ultimate Marvel ===
An alternate universe version of Quentin Quire appears in the Ultimate Marvel imprint.

=== What If ===
An alternate version of Quentin Quire briefly appears in the What If: Rise & Fall of the Shi'ar Empire one-shot. After Vulcan is transported into the White Hot Room, he tells Vulcan that he is not meant to be there.

== In other media ==
=== Television ===
Quentin Quire appears in X-Men '97, voiced by Thomas Dekker.

=== Film ===
- The Omega Gang, simply called the "Omegas", appears in X-Men: The Last Stand, consisting of Quill, Callisto, Arclight, Psylocke, Spike, Glob Herman, and Phat. Additionally, Quill (portrayed by Ken Leung) is credited as "Kid Omega", which the production team stated to be an error.
- Quentin Quire makes a cameo appearance in Dark Phoenix.

=== Video games ===
- Kid Omega appears as a playable character in Marvel Future Fight.
- Kid Omega appears in Marvel Snap.
