= Oya (comics) =

Marvel Comics character

- Oya as depicted in Generation Hope #2 (February 2011). Art by Greg Land.

Publication information
- Publisher: Marvel Comics
- First appearance: The Uncanny X-Men #528 (September 2010)
- Created by: Matt Fraction; Kieron Gillen

In-story information
- Alter ego: Idie Okonkwo
- Species: Human mutant
- Team affiliations: X-Men in training The Lights; X-Men; Jean Grey School Students
- Notable aliases: The Girl Who Wouldn't Burn, The Girl Who Wouldn't Freeze, The Third Light, Temper
- Abilities: Temperature manipulation

Idie Okonkwo is a superheroine appearing in American comic books published by Marvel Comics. The character first appeared in The Uncanny X-Men #528 (September 2010), in the third chapter of the "Five Lights" storyline, and was created by Matt Fraction and Kieron Gillen. She is one of the "Five Lights"—a group of mutants who manifested their abilities after the events of "Second Coming".

Originally known as Oya, Idie Okonkwo joined Cyclops' X-Men team in the "From the Ashes" relaunch, taking the new codename Temper.

== Publication history ==
Oya first appeared in Uncanny X-Men #528 (September 2010) as a newly manifested mutant who is deeply conflicted about her powers. Following her introduction, she, along with Hope Summers, Velocidad, Transonic, Zero, and Primal, was featured in the series Generation Hope. She made appearances in Uncanny X-Men, Wolverine and the X-Men, All-New X-Men, and Sabretooth & The Exiles.

Idie Okonkwo appears as a main character in the X-Men relaunch "From the Ashes", where she joins the X-Men team led by Cyclops. In this storyline, she assumes the new codename of Temper. This name was chosen by writer Jed MacKay and editor Tom Brevoort, who decided that Temper sounded more like a "super hero-sounding code name" than Oya.

== Fictional character biography ==
=== The Third Light ===
Idie is a fourteen-year-old girl from Delta State, Nigeria when her powers manifest. The first manifestation of her powers causes her village to burn down, and when she starts to freeze things as well, she is considered by the locals to be a witch. By the time Storm and Hope arrive, Idie's family and friends have been killed. Hope stabilizes Idie's powers, and Idie uses her new abilities to drive away the paramilitary group that was attempting to kill her. Idie's trauma, combined with the survivors' treatment of her, causes her to view herself as a monster.

=== Schism ===
Oya is one of the X-Men to attend the opening of a Mutant History Museum, a group that includes several adult and younger mutants. When the Museum is attacked by the Hellfire Club, most of the X-Men are quickly defeated as Oya hides. Wolverine and Cyclops rush towards the museum, but the Hellfire grunts set up a bomb within the museum. To Wolverine's protest, Cyclops gives Oya the go ahead to do anything she thinks necessary, and Oya kills most of the Hellfire grunts with little remorse.

=== Regenesis ===
Oya joins the Hellfire Academy for the sole purpose of finding out who shot Broo. She catches the eye of Kade Kilgore, who wants to make her his girlfriend and the Black Queen of the Hellfire Club. While changing into her new Black Queen outfit, Oya questions Kilgore, who reveals that he shot Broo. After a fight, Oya escapes along with Quentin Quire and Toad.

=== Residing on Krakoa ===
When Oya and Nekra kill a group of mercenaries who were invading Krakoa by sea, they are sentenced to the Pit of Exile for breaking Krakoa's law against murder. Sabretooth formulates a plan for the group to escape the pit by channeling their consciousnesses through the island so they can manifest themselves on land. When a fight between Sabretooth and Melter almost kills everyone in the pit, Nekra and Oya are saved when Third-Eye drags their consciousnesses to the astral plane. The group discusses what they did to get thrown in the pit and whether they deserve to be there. Shortly afterwards, they meet with Cypher, who informs them that Sabretooth has betrayed them and escaped the Pit. He offers them freedom in exchange for tracking down Sabretooth. The team tracks Sabretooth to Noble Island, where they free a group of Orchis prisoners.

=== From the Ashes ===
Following the end of the Krakoan Age, Idie joins Cyclops' X-Men team and assumes the new codename of Temper.

== Powers and abilities ==
Idie Okonkwo is able to manipulate temperature, which enables her to transfer heat from one area to another and generate fire and ice. In addition, her body is immune to extreme temperatures. Idie can absorb heat into herself, then release it as fire without having to simultaneously create ice. Idie is unable to create fire and ice from nothing and requires the presence of one to create the other.
