= Angel Salvadore =

Marvel Comics fictional character

Angel Salvadore-Bohusk Tempest
- Angel Salvadore as seen in The New Warriors #3 (October 2007). Art by Paco Medina.

Publication information
- Publisher: Marvel Comics
- First appearance: New X-Men #118 (November 2001)
- Created by: Grant Morrison (writer); Ethan Van Sciver (artist)

In-story information
- Alter ego: Angel Salvadore-Bohusk
- Species: Human mutant
- Team affiliations: Xavier Institute; Special Class; Exemplars Squad; Hellfire Club; Brotherhood of Evil Mutants; New Warriors; Teen Brigade
- Notable aliases: Angel; Tempest
- Abilities: Insectoid physiology granting: Acid generation and projection; Sonic vibrational capacities; Flight via insectoid wings; Temperature-controlling gauntlets; Anti-gravity discs

Angel Salvadore-Bohusk is a fictional character appearing in American comic books published by Marvel Comics. Created by Grant Morrison and Ethan Van Sciver, the character first appeared in New X-Men #118 (November 2001). She belongs to the subspecies of humans called mutants, who are born with superhuman abilities, with her mutation giving her insect physiology, including acid projection and a pair of butterfly-like wings. Angel is also known by her codename Tempest.

Zoë Kravitz portrayed Angel Salvadore in the 2011 film X-Men: First Class.

== Publication history ==
Angel Salvadore first appeared in New X-Men #118 (November 2001), created by writer Grant Morrison and artist Ethan Van Sciver. From 2001 to 2004 she appears sporadically in New X-Men #119–150. In 2003, she appears in Marvel Universe: The End #1 and #5. In 2004, she makes two appearances in Exiles with issues #46 and #48. One year later, she makes on appearance in volume 2 of New X-Men in issue #11. Then, she appears in the story "House of M: World Tour" in Exiles #69–71 and "The Day After" in Decimation: House of M #1 (January 2006).

Angel Salvadore is depowered. From 2007 to 2009, under the codename Tempest, she appears in New Warriors #2–7 and #10–20.

In 2011, she appears in Heroic Age: X-Men #1 (February 2011) and an alternate version appears in Age of X: Universe #2 (June 2011). Angel appears in Vengeance, a six-issue 2011 miniseries by writer Joe Casey and penciller Nick Dragotta.

== Fictional character biography ==
=== Rescue ===
Angel Salvadore is 14 years old when her mutation first manifests, and she is driven out of her home by her abusive step-father. The following morning, she wakes up in a cocoon and emerges with a pair of insect wings. She is later captured by U-Men, humans who harvest mutants for their body parts for their own use. Wolverine rescues her from a mobile operating theater. He kills all the U-Men and offers to escort her to the Xavier Institute for Higher Learning. They stop at a diner along the way, but the owner becomes aggressive towards them because of his fear of mutants. The owner attacks them when he sees Angel digesting her food like a fly. Finally, Wolverine brings Angel to the Xavier Institute and they watch Jean Grey expel an army of U-Men from the school.

=== Xavier Institute ===
At first Angel does not fit in well, especially with Emma Frost. However, Emma takes Angel's attitude to be a challenge, instead opting to take Angel under her wing as a mentor and mold Angel into a sophisticated young woman. Angel later helps the X-Men battle Cassandra Nova by working with the Stepford Cuckoos and stealing needed DNA samples.

After accepting a bet to kiss her classmate Beak, Angel grows close to him, and they begin to see each other romantically and sexually. Angel, Beak, and the other Special Class students are part of another confrontation with the U-Men, deep in the woods on the Xavier Mansion grounds. Angel is the only one to see Xorn brutally murder the U-Men. He convinces her to keep the events secret by bribing her with candy.

Emma and Angel's relationship deepens after Emma and the Stepford Cuckoos come to differences. During a shopping spree, Angel tries to tell a distracted Emma that she is pregnant. Angel and Beak's efforts are recognized in an awards ceremony held by the institute. The two sneak outside, not realizing they had any chance of winning, and Angel reveals to Beak she is pregnant, fearing that Emma will have them expelled. Due to her insect-like physiology, her pregnancy rate is accelerated and she gives birth via eggs. Angel later kills Emma Frost under the mind control of Esme, but is soon acquitted and Emma is revived.

=== Xorn's Brotherhood and later ===
Shortly afterwards, Xorn, instructor of the Special Class, apparently reveals himself to be the mutant terrorist Magneto (his true identity is later revised). He has been responsible for corrupting Esme, and he has been teaching the class pro-Magneto propaganda under the guise of Xorn all along.

Angel is convinced to serve as a member of his latest incarnation of the Brotherhood of Mutants. The school is demolished and conquered. Manhattan itself is taken over by Magneto. Angel and her children come along as part of the Brotherhood. Beak rebels early on, not wanting to see captured humans killed. Beak is seemingly killed for his efforts, dropped from a levitating car. He survives and joins with the X-Men. Angel herself feels the need to rebel when Magneto threatens her classmate Martha. Beak leads the X-Men back to Magneto's stronghold, using the key nobody had bothered to take from him before he was attacked. Magneto/Xorn is swiftly defeated and decapitated by Wolverine.

Later, Beak is made an honorary X-Man, and he, Angel, and their children begin living on the Xavier property. Beak is unhinged from time and joins the Exiles, ostensibly to prepare him for a future event during which several worlds will be threatened. As a result of this displacement, he is for a time unable to interact with beings from his home timeline, and Angel and their family believed him to have run away. Only by serving with the Exiles could he win them back. According to a 2010 retcon, during this time period Angel served as a member of Beast's squad of X-Men trainees, the Exemplars Squad, though the identities of her teammates are unknown.

In the Decimation event, Angel, Beak, and their children (except Tito) are among the mutants depowered by the Scarlet Witch.

=== New Warriors ===
Angel and Beak later resurface as members of the New Warriors. Now going by the name Tempest, Angel has gained fire, ice, and wind/flight powers given to her through technological means by Night Thrasher. Angel later regains her mutant powers through unknown means.

== Powers and abilities ==
Angel Salvadore is a mutant with insect-like physiology that enables her to generate acid, fly, and generate sonic blasts by vibrating her wings. As a member of the New Warriors, Angel utilized anti-gravity discs and gauntlets that can generate heat and cold to make up for her lack of powers.

== Reception ==
=== Accolades ===
- In 2014, Entertainment Weekly ranked Angel Salvadore 37th in their "Let's rank every X-Man ever" list.
- In 2014, BuzzFeed ranked Angel Salvadore 66th in their "95 X-Men Members Ranked From Worst To Best" list.
- In 2020, Scary Mommy included Angel Salvadore in their "Looking For A Role Model? These 195+ Marvel Female Characters Are Truly Heroic" list.
- In 2021, Screen Rant included Angel Salvadore in their "Marvel: 10 Incredible Latinx Characters" list.

== Other versions ==
- An alternate universe version of Angel Salvadore from Earth-58163 appears in House of M.
- An alternate universe version of Angel Salvadore from Earth-11326 appears in Age of X: Universe #2.

== In other media ==
- Angel Salvadore appears in X-Men: First Class, portrayed by Zoë Kravitz. This version hails from 1962 and initially works as a stripper until she is recruited by Charles Xavier and Erik Lehnsherr to join their fledgling "Division X" and stop the Hellfire Club before they can cause World War III. However, she later defects to the latter group due to mutant prejudices and joins them in their attempt to instigate the Cuban Missile Crisis until Xavier and Lehnsherr's group foil them. After Lehnsherr kills the Hellfire Club's leader, Sebastian Shaw, Salvadore and the remaining members defect to Lehnsherr's side.
- As of X-Men: Days of Future Past and its accompanying viral marketing campaign, Salvadore took on the name "Tempest", but was captured, experimented on, and killed by Bolivar Trask and Project Wideawake sometime before the film.
- Angel Salvadore makes non-speaking appearances in X-Men '97.
