= Xorn =

Fictional characters from Marvel Comics

- Xorn as depicted in New X-Men #127 (June 2002). Art by Frank Quitely.

Publication information
- Publisher: Marvel Comics
- First appearance: New X-Men Annual 2001 (September 2001)
- Created by: Grant Morrison (writer); Frank Quitely (artist)

In-story information
- Alter ego: Kuan-Yin Xorn; Shen Xorn
- Species: Human mutant
- Team affiliations: (Kuan-Yin); X-Men; Brotherhood of Mutants; Xavier Institute (Shen); X-Men
- Notable aliases: (Kuan-Yin); Magneto, The Collective, Michael Pointer
- Abilities: (Kuan-Yin): Sun in his head; Healing powers; Electricity and magnetism generation and manipulation; Teleportation via Time-Space Wormholes; Gravity manipulation; Telepathy; Self-sustenance; Can cause his sun to turn into a black hole; (Shen): Black Hole in his head; Healing powers; Teleportation (Time-Space Wormholes); Gravity manipulation; Telepathy; Self-sustenance; Can cause his black hole to turn into a sun

Xorn is the alias of two fictional characters appearing in American comic books published by Marvel Comics. He first appeared in New X-Men Annual 2001 (September 2001). He was created by Grant Morrison and Frank Quitely. He is a mutant who has a miniature star residing in his head, which gives him the abilities of gravitational electromagnetism, self-sustenance, and healing. He is most commonly associated with the X-Men and Brotherhood of Mutants. Initially in the pages of New X-Men, he was revealed to be Magneto in disguise. However, a later issue established him as a separate character named Kuan-Yin Xorn and his brother Shen Xorn.

== Publication history ==
Xorn first appeared in New X-Men Annual 2001 (September 2001), Xorn was created by Grant Morrison and Frank Quitely. Originally depicted as a Chinese mutant with a "star for a brain," he is eventually revealed to be the X-Men's nemesis Magneto in disguise at the climax of Morrison's run. After Magneto is apparently killed during the "Planet X" story arc, he appears alive in 2004's Excalibur (vol. 3) #1, which established that Xorn never was Magneto. Marvel has presented several partial explanations, both in the comics pages and in the press as to the true nature, identity, and motives of Xorn.

Grant Morrison intended Xorn to be Magneto from his first appearance. As Morrison stated in an interview after they left New X-Men, "In my opinion, there really should not have been an actual Xorn - he had to be fake, that was the cruel point of him". In fact, soon after the revelation of Xorn's identity in New X-Men #146, readers pointed out that clues that Xorn was actually Magneto had been hidden throughout Morrison's run. According to then-X-Men writer Chuck Austen, the X-Men editors liked the Xorn character and hoped Morrison would change their mind about the revelation; when Morrison did not, the editors asked Austen to bring Xorn back as a separate character. Morrison has expressed criticism of this subsequent retcon in interviews. Marvel also wanted to continue using Magneto; Austen stated that "Marvel saw value in Magneto not being a mass-murderer of New Yorkers."

The true identity of Xorn, and his relationship to Magneto, became a subject of confusion for fans. Marvel refrained from giving any complete explanation, eventually hinting the summer 2005 crossover House of M would clear up the situation. The Xorn entry in the Official Handbook of the Marvel Universe: X-Men 2005 stated that "Kuan-Yin eventually revealed himself to be a duplicate of the X-Men's nemesis Magneto, a transformation believed to have been caused by Magneto's daughter, the Scarlet Witch." This explanation was based on a suggestion in House of M #7 wherein Doctor Strange speculates Wanda has been 'playing with the world' for far longer than even she knows, and may have been responsible for her father's puzzling rebirth. An alternative explanation has since been given in the pages of New Avengers because, according to Marvel editor Tom Brevoort, "nobody was satisfied with that offhanded non-explanation, and it didn't make a heck of a lot of sense by itself even as a throwaway".

In a 2006 interview, Marvel editor-in-chief Joe Quesada reiterated the Shen Xorn/Kuan-Yin Xorn explanation, but added that "because Xorn's powers were psychokinetic, and his personality was so strong, it basically remained an almost disembodied sentient thing among the big ball of mutant energy. When that energy got sucked down to Earth by Michael [Pointer] and all absorbed by him, Xorn was the dominant personality in the mix, and that's what drove him towards Genosha and Magneto."

== Fictional character biography ==
=== New X-Men ===
Xorn is introduced as a prisoner of the Chinese government, where a corrupt mutant official offers to sell him to Sublime. While in the prison of Feng Tu, Xorn is forced to wear a skull-like mask designed to restrain his energy output, as he has a "sun" in place of a brain. The X-Men and Sublime's U-Men find Xorn just as he is attempting to commit suicide by removing his mask, which would destroy Earth. Cyclops and Emma Frost establish contact with Xorn, convincing him not to kill himself, and offer him a position among the X-Men. Xorn is next seen in New X-Men #122, where Cyclops is informed that Xorn possesses healing abilities. Xorn heals the X-Men of a nano-Sentinel infection, restoring Professor X's ability to walk in the process.

Despite the ordeals through which he had passed, Xorn is optimistic, open, and even somewhat naïve. Xorn keeps a diary to share his thoughts with Professor Xavier, since Xavier is "blinded by the sun beneath [his] mask" and cannot read his mind. Xorn is soon put in charge of the "Special Class", a group of misfit students attending the Xavier Institute.

Xorn unmasks himself as "Magneto" in New X-Men #146. Art by Phil Jimenez

In the storyline "Planet X", Xorn is revealed to be Magneto, who has been believed dead since the destruction of Genosha. Magneto explains the Xorn identity was an elaborate ruse crafted with the help of Chinese supporters. Having returned Xavier to a crippled state, Magneto levels the X-Mansion and conquers New York City, where he enslaves the human population and destroys much of the city.

Magneto finds that many of his recruits are unresponsive to his ideas and approach, with some asking for the return of the more humane Xorn, and others doubtful that Magneto has truly returned, much to his chagrin. Magneto announces a plan to invert the planet by reversing its magnetic poles, and employs increasingly fascistic methods, including the construction of a crematorium in which he plans to eradicate the remaining human population of the city. Magneto kills Jean Grey and is killed by Wolverine in response.

=== The return of Magneto and the second Xorn ===
Xavier takes the body of Magneto to Genosha, where his funeral is held. Shortly afterward, Xavier meets Magneto alive and well on Genosha. Xavier and Magneto later debate the true identity and motives of Xorn, the individual whose body was brought to Genosha. Shortly afterward, Xorn's twin brother Shen Xorn is introduced. He claims that the original Xorn (now referred to as Kuan-Yin Xorn) had impersonated Magneto while under the influence of Sublime. Not too long after, Shen disappears after he unleashes the gravitational forces of his "black hole" for a brain from his head (in direct contrast to his twin brother) while fending off the Brotherhood of Mutants.

Xorn and Magneto are among the mutants who lost their powers to the Scarlet Witch during the Decimation event.

=== The Collective ===
Later, an Alaskan postal worker named Michael Pointer gains the powers of the depowered mutants, in part due to unknowingly being a mutant himself. Disoriented and wielding the power of at least fifty mutants, he rampages across rural Canada, kills nearly every member of Alpha Flight, and destroys downtown Cleveland. After Spider-Man and Vision discover the nature of Pointer's powers, he is allowed to leave, and so travels, without causing further destruction, to Genosha.

The collective of energy, now revealed to be sentient and responsible for Pointer's actions, transfers into Magneto, restoring his powers. Magneto recognizes the intelligence controlling the energy as Xorn. Xorn explains he took the image of Magneto because he knew mutants would follow him, and they needed the real Magneto again. Quake, Iron Man, Ms. Marvel, and Sentry combine their powers to separate the Collective/Xorn from Magneto and send it into the sun.

=== All-New, All-Different Marvel ===
During the "Inhumanity" storyline, Terrigen Mist is spread across Earth, proving fatal to mutants. Shen Xorn kills Barrage and make quick work of the rest of the Dark Riders, who attempted to attack him.

=== House of X ===
Following the consolidation of mutant peoples on Krakoa during the House of X storyline, Kuan-Yin Xorn is resurrected through Krakoa's resurrection protocols. The Xorn brothers (now calling themselves Xorn and Zorn) remain on Krakoa and occasionally lend their powers to other mutants' causes - such as David Haller's work as a community healer.

== Reception ==
In 2014, Entertainment Weekly ranked Xorn 55th in their "Let's rank every X-Man ever" list.

== Other versions ==
=== Age of Apocalypse ===
An alternate universe version of Xorn appears in "Age of Apocalypse". This version is an identity assumed by Husk, who was believed to have been dead. Husk was manipulated by Mister Sinister and assumed the identity of Xorn, infiltrating the X-Men to kill Magneto and Rogue's son Charles.

=== Battle of the Atom ===
An alternate universe version of Xorn appears in the storyline Battle of the Atom. This version is a time-displaced counterpart of Jean Grey who requires the Xorn mask to control her powers and is an ally of the Brotherhood of Mutants.

=== Ultimate Marvel ===
Alternate universe versions of the Xorn siblings appear in the Ultimate Marvel imprint. These versions are the leaders of the People, a genetically altered species of superhumans who were created by the Southeast Asian Republic as super-soldiers, but later rebelled.

=== Earth-71202 ===
Alternate universe versions of the Xorn siblings from Earth-71202 appear in New Avengers (vol. 3) #24, where they are killed by Terrax during the Cabal's attack on their universe.

=== Powers of X ===
In one of the timelines experienced by Moira MacTaggert during the Powers of X storyline, Kuan-Yin Xorn becomes one of the final Horsemen of Apocalypse, representing Death. His powers are reversed, sucking away life rather than restoring it, and his helmet is now a mostly-open mask from which blue flame spouts. After Rasputin IV encounters Xorn, she removes his mask at his request, which exposes the singularity in his head and destroys the universe.

== In other media ==
Xorn appears as a DLC skin for Magneto in Marvel: Ultimate Alliance.

Xorn appears as a playable card in Marvel Snap.
