= New X-Men (2001 series) =

2001 comic book series

- The cover to New X-Men #114, the first issue of the series. Art by Frank Quitely.

Publication information
- Publisher: Marvel Comics
- Schedule: Monthly
- Genre: Superhero
- Publication date: May 2001 – March 2004
- No. of issues: 44 (#114–156 + Annual 2001)
- Main character: List: Angel Salvadore Beak Beast Cyclops Emma Frost Jean Grey Stepford Cuckoos Wolverine Xorn

Creative team
- Created by: Grant Morrison; Frank Quitely
- Written by: List: Grant Morrison Chuck Austen
- Penciller: List: Frank Quitely Leinil Francis Yu Igor Kordey Ethan Van Sciver Phil Jimenez Chris Bachalo Marc Silvestri
- Inker: List: Prentis Rollins Danny Miki

New X-Men is an American comic book ongoing series, written by Grant Morrison and published by Marvel Comics, featuring the X-Men. It was a retitling of the then-ongoing second volume of the main X-Men series, and shares the series' numbering, as opposed to creating a different ongoing series with a new number one issue. During a revamp of the entire X-Men franchise, newly appointed Marvel Comics Editor-in-Chief Joe Quesada spoke of his idea for flagship titles like X-Men to regain some of their "former glory," as well as regaining critical acclaim.

To that end, Quesada recruited Morrison, at that point best known for their high-profile works at DC Comics, both in their mature Vertigo Comics title The Invisibles, as well as their long-running stint on the JLA title featuring the Justice League of America. Morrison's run was defined by an objective to modernize the pathos of the X-Men due to what the writer perceived as a creative stagnation during the mid-late 1990s. His tenure on the book implemented significant status quo shifts for both the team and the social standing of mutants in the Marvel Universe, through pivotal events such as the deaths of a substantial amount of the mutant population during the first arc "E Is for Extinction", the induction of former X-Men adversary Emma Frost into the team lineup, and the public outing of Professor X's mutant status expanding their influence, including the reconfiguration of the X-Mansion into the Xavier Institute as an outreach and education center for displaced mutants, the founding of X-Corporation as a global organization dedicated to upholding mutant protections against prejudice, and the formation of District X as a hub for mutant culture in New York City.

The latter half of New X-Men explored the team's progress in achieving acceptance, including themes of ideological indoctrination, substance abuse through the introduction of a drug called "Kick" which amplified mutant powers, further intrigue about Wolverine's origins through the revelation of the Weapon Plus program, the reemergence of Magneto as a major antagonist to the X-Men, and a dark alternate future where surviving members of the team and a human ally band together to stop a corrupted Beast from destroying remnants of human and mutantkind.

New X-Men ran for 44 issues and one annual between May 2001 and March 2004. In this period, Grant Morrison worked with a rotating roster of artists such as frequent collaborator Frank Quitely, Igor Kordey and Leinil Francis Yu, created new characters such as Cassandra Nova, Angel Salvadore, Fantomex, the Stepford Cuckoos, Quentin Quire and the identity of Xorn, as well as introduced concepts such as secondary mutations and the specialized Wild Sentinels. Morrison's run has been acclaimed, with both critics and fans commending it for pushing the themes, aesthetics and ideas of the X-Men forward and making important changes to their narrative standing that had lasting effects on subsequent storylines throughout the 21st century.

== Story arcs ==
The full run of Morrison's New X-Men consisted of eight full story arcs with one issue designed to be read in between the first and second arcs, as all stories in New X-Men are largely interconnected and tell a long-form narrative.

- "E Is for Extinction" (#114–116, illustrated by Frank Quitely) – Cassandra Nova destroys Genosha using a new series of Sentinels and Emma Frost returns to the X-Men.
- "The Man from Room X" (Annual 2001, illustrated by Leinil Francis Yu) – A Chinese army officer, Ao Jun, is concluding the secret sale of a powerful captive mutant, Kuan-Yin Xorn, with John Sublime. To prevent that sale, Domino, of Asia's X-Corporation, is welcoming the X-Men at Hong Kong. Sublime is there promoting his U-Men, humans with grafted mutant organs. When Xorn contemplates committing suicide, which due to his mutation would destroy Hong Kong, Cyclops attempts to persuade him to instead join the X-Men.
- "Imperial" (#118–126, illustrated by Ethan Van Sciver, Frank Quitely and Igor Kordey) – Delving deeper into the motivations of Cassandra Nova, this story further fleshed out the makeup of the Xavier Institute's student body by introducing new students such as Angel Salvadore and Beak, as well as giving a more in-depth focus on the Stepford Cuckoos and the U-Men.
- "New Worlds" (#127–133, illustrated by Igor Kordey, John Paul Leon, Phil Jimenez and Ethan Van Sciver) – In the aftermath of both the Genoshan genocide and Cassandra Nova's revelation of Professor X's mutant powers, as well as his school's function as a mutant haven, the X-Men must try to broker peace amidst rising human/mutant tensions, while still combating the mutant threats arising worldwide. This story arc not only dealt with the fallout of Genosha's destruction, but also began the psychic affair shared by Cyclops and Emma Frost.
- "Riot at Xavier's" (#134–138, illustrated by Frank Quitely) – This arc is centered around Quentin Quire, who is fleshed out as a super-intelligent young teenager and a pupil of Professor X's mutant school at the X-Mansion. When he finds out he is adopted, and the mutant celebrity Jumbo Carnation is killed by anti-mutant racists, Quire begins to mock Xavier's pacifistic teachings, hero-worships the mutant supremacist Magneto, and assembles a gang of militant classmates to kill humans in retaliation. Their rage is fueled by consumption of the drug Kick, which supercharges their mutant abilities.
- "Murder at the Mansion" (#139–141, illustrated by Phil Jimenez) – After finding her husband in a "mental" sexual relationship with Emma Frost, Jean Grey thrusts Cyclops out of the shared mindscape to quarrel with Emma. Using the power of the Phoenix, Jean burns through Emma's psychic defenses, ultimately revealing her hidden past. As Jean is about to discover whether or not Scott was physically unfaithful to his wife during an assignment in Hong Kong, he breaks into the room containing Jean and Emma and demands that Jean search his mind for the answer. As Jean understands that her husband's affair was not physical, Cyclops leaves the mansion. Hours later, Beast discovers Emma Frost's shattered crystalline remains. Bishop arrives to investigate her death, in which every member of the X-Men is suspect.
- "Assault on Weapon Plus" (#142–145, illustrated by Chris Bachalo) – Cyclops, who has recently left the X-Men after his psychic affair with Emma Frost was exposed, is found by Wolverine drinking at the Hellfire Club, and is contemplating quitting the X-Men. Incidentally, Sabretooth is also dining at the facility. Wolverine is aggressive toward Sabretooth, but is unable to escalate an argument into a conflict because it is against the rules of the Hellfire Club for patrons to fight within the building. Fantomex arrives and convinces both Cyclops and Wolverine to join him in breaking into the Weapon Plus installation floating in orbit around the Earth.

It is in this story that Wolverine discovers most of the details of his past (although they are not revealed to the reader), and where it is discovered that Weapon X is actually Weapon Ten. Weapon Plus is also discovered to go back to at least World War II, with their first program revealed to be Operation: Rebirth which created the original Captain America (designated as Weapon I).

- "Planet X" (#146–150, illustrated by Phil Jimenez) – Jean Grey, Beast, and Emma Frost leave the X-Mansion while Xorn forces the newest member of the "Special Class", Dust, to attack Professor X and destroy Cerebra. Confronting Xavier, Xorn imprisons Dust in a jar to keep her from helping the professor, and then removes his mask, to reveal that he is Magneto in disguise. Magneto, enjoying the lack of progress Xavier has made in improving mutantkind's lot since his "death" (partly due to his manipulations), has begun to teach his militant anti-human philosophy to the Special Class while indulging in the mutant-power enhancing drug Kick, supplied to him by his helper, Esme of the Stepford Cuckoos.
- "Here Comes Tomorrow" (#151–154, illustrated by Marc Silvestri) – In the far future, human X-Man Tom Skylark evades a pack of Crawlers (foot soldiers genetically engineered from Nightcrawler's DNA, along with the powers of other X-Men, namely Jamie Madrox, Scott Summers, and others) amongst the ruins of the X-Mansion. His Sentinel partner, Rover, dispatches the Crawlers. Tom is met by E.V.A., a representative of the Xavier Institute, now an interspecies organization. Together, they transport the Phoenix Egg, found on the Moon, to the X-Men's secure headquarters in the Manhattan Crater. However, a Crawler sneaks inside the compound, replicates itself using Multiple Man's DNA, and attacks with the force of an army with Cyclops' DNA. E.V.A. and Tom are rescued by the efforts of a bird-man named Tito (descended from Beak), but the Phoenix Egg is teleported back to the Crawlers' master and creator: Beast's future self.

It is in the final act of this arc that Jean, using the Phoenix Force, allows Scott to return to the X-Men and begin a life with Emma Frost in an act of compassion and love, as well as ensuring that the future in which she now resides never comes to pass.

== Legacy ==
Some of the more long-lasting changes occurred during Morrison's run. Beast undergoes a secondary mutation that makes him into a lion-like creature, rather than his former ape-like appearance. Emma Frost was introduced as a member of the team. The ties between Jean Grey and the Phoenix (leaning into the second retcon Claremont establishes) were revisited and the death of Phoenix occurs in Morrison's run. The school expanded from simply a training center to a legitimate school with dozens of mutant students, a story idea that was first explored in the X-Men film. One of the more controversial events of New X-Men happened in issue #115 when the island of Genosha and its inhabitants, including Magneto, were completely destroyed. This set the tone that dominated the rest of Morrison's tenure on the book.

In June 2004, Chuck Austen, previously the writer of Uncanny X-Men, moved to New X-Men with issue #155. The title of the series reverted to its original title of X-Men in July 2004 with issue #157 during the "X-Men Reload" event.

== Aftermath ==
=== Xorn and Magneto ===
Grant Morrison intended Xorn to be Magneto from his first appearance. As Morrison stated in an interview after they left New X-Men, "In my opinion, there really shouldn't have been an actual Xorn – he had to be fake, that was the cruel point of him". In fact, soon after the revelation of Xorn's identity in New X-Men #146, readers pointed out that clues that Xorn was actually Magneto had been hidden throughout Morrison's run. According to then-X-Men writer Chuck Austen, the X-Men editors liked the Xorn character and hoped Morrison would change their mind about the revelation; when they did not, the editors asked Austen to bring Xorn back as a separate character. Marvel also wanted to continue using Magneto; Austen stated that "Marvel saw value in Magneto not being a mass-murderer of New Yorkers." Morrison has expressed criticism of this subsequent retcon in interviews.

Marvel retconned the Xorn/Magneto revelation and brought back Xorn and Magneto after Morrison's departure. In Uncanny X-Men #442 and 443, Xavier takes the body of Magneto to Genosha where they hold a funeral for the deceased mutant leader. However, in the last page of Excalibur #1, Xavier meets Magneto alive and well on Genosha. In subsequent issues of Excalibur, Xavier and Magneto debate the true identity and motives of Xorn, the individual whose bandage-wrapped body they brought to Genosha. In the same month, Magneto returned in Chris Claremont's new Excalibur book, Austen's X-Men #157 introduced a new Xorn named Shen Xorn. Shen Xorn claims to be the twin brother of the original Xorn (now referred to as Kuan-Yin Xorn) who, under the influence of the entity known as Sublime, had pretended to be Magneto. This claim is supported when Emma Frost conducts a thorough mind scan of Shen. Not too long after, Shen Xorn disappears when he unleashes the gravitational forces of a black hole in the course of helping the X-Men defeat an attack by a Brotherhood of Mutants led by Exodus. Later, Shen Xorn is revealed to have been one of the mutants depowered due to the events of the House of M miniseries.

The true identity of Xorn, and his relationship to the character Magneto, became a subject of confusion to fans. Marvel refrained from giving a complete explanation, eventually hinting that the summer 2005 crossover House of M would clear up the situation. The Xorn entry in the Official Handbook of the Marvel Universe: X-Men 2005 stated that "Kuan-Yin eventually revealed himself to be a duplicate of the X-Men's nemesis Magneto, a transformation believed to have been caused by Magneto's daughter, the Scarlet Witch." This explanation was based on a suggestion in House of M #7 wherein Doctor Strange speculates that Wanda has been 'playing with the world' for far longer than even she knows, and may have been responsible for her father's puzzling rebirth. An alternative explanation has since been given in the pages of New Avengers since, according to Marvel editor Tom Brevoort, "nobody was satisfied with that offhanded non-explanation, and it didn’t make a heck of a lot of sense by itself even as a throwaway".

=== Follow-up ===
As far back as 2003, popular television and film writer Joss Whedon was rumored to be Morrison's successor on the New X-Men title. In an interview, Whedon clarified he was asked to take over the New X-Men title, but this was instead changed to a new volume of Astonishing X-Men to accommodate his collaborator John Cassaday. Whedon then clarified that his run on Astonishing was a direct continuation of Morrison's work when he said, "I was reading New X-Men and loving it. The other part of the equation was [working with] John Cassaday. I had been talking about doing something with John for years. Then, once I signed on, I was told it wasn't New X-Men but Astonishing X-Men. I was like 'What?' But I took the same premise and cast that Grant established and worked from there because I was caught up in that book."

== Collected editions ==
Title	Material Collected	Publication Date	ISBN
New X-Men, vol. 1: E Is For Extinction	New X-Men Vol. 1 #114–117; New X-Men Annual 2001	December 2002	0-7851-0811-4
New X-Men, vol. 2: Imperial	New X-Men Vol. 1 #118–126	July 2002	0-7851-0887-4
New X-Men, vol. 3: New Worlds	New X-Men Vol. 1 #127–133	December 2002	0-7851-0976-5
New X-Men, vol. 4: Riot at Xavier's	New X-Men Vol. 1 #134–138	July 2003	0-7851-1067-4
New X-Men, vol. 5: Assault on Weapon Plus	New X-Men Vol. 1 #139–145	December 2003	0-7851-1119-0
New X-Men, vol. 6: Planet X	New X-Men Vol. 1 #146–150	April 2004	0-7851-1201-4
New X-Men, vol. 7: Here Comes Tomorrow	New X-Men Vol. 1 #151–154	July 2004	0-7851-1345-2
New X-Men by Grant Morrison: Ultimate Collection, vol. 1	New X-Men Vol. 1 #114–126; New X-Men Annual 2001	June 2008	0-7851-3251-1
New X-Men by Grant Morrison: Ultimate Collection, vol. 2	New X-Men Vol. 1 #127–141	September 2008	0-7851-3252-X
New X-Men by Grant Morrison: Ultimate Collection, vol. 3	New X-Men Vol. 1 #142–154	December 2008	0-7851-3253-8
Uncanny X-Men, vol. 6: Bright New Mourning	New X-Men Vol. 1 #155–156; Uncanny X-Men #435–436, #442–443	August 2004	0-7851-1406-8
New X-Men Omnibus	New X-Men Vol. 1 #114–154; New X-Men Annual 2001	December 2006	0-7851-2326-1
