= List of X-Men members =

The X-Men are a team of mutant superheroes, published in American comic books by Marvel Comics. Over the decades, the team have featured a rotating line up composed of many members.

Notation:

- A slash (/) between names indicates codenames in chronological order.
- Characters listed are set in the Earth-616 continuity, except when noted.

== Members ==
=== Original members ===
Original X-Men members
Character	Name	Joined in
Professor X	Charles Francis Xavier	The X-Men #1 (September 1963)
Cyclops	Scott Summers	The X-Men #43 (April 1968, flashback story)
Iceman	Robert "Bobby" Louis Drake	The X-Men #46 (July 1968, flashback story)
Beast	Henry "Hank" Philip McCoy	The X-Men #53 (February 1969, flashback story)
Angel / Archangel	Warren Kenneth Worthington III	The X-Men #56 (May 1969, flashback story)
Marvel Girl / Phoenix	Jean Elaine Grey	The X-Men #1 (September 1963)

=== Recruits ===
==== 1960s ====
1960s X-Men recruits
Character	Name	Joined in
Mimic	Calvin Montgomery Rankin	The X-Men #27 (December 1966)
Changeling / Morph	Kevin Sidney	The X-Men #40 (January 1968, as Professor X)
Polaris	Lorna Sally Dane	The X-Men #60 (September 1969)

==== 1970s ====
1970s X-Men recruits
Character	Name	Joined in
Havok	Alexander "Alex" Summers	The X-Men #65 (February 1970)
Wolverine	James "Logan" Howlett	Earth-616 Logan: Giant-Size X-Men #1 (July 1975) Old Man Logan: Extraordinary X-Men #1 (November 2015)
Nightcrawler	Kurt Wagner	Giant-Size X-Men #1 (July 1975)
Banshee	Sean Cassidy	Giant-Size X-Men #1 (July 1975)
Storm	Ororo Munroe	Giant-Size X-Men #1 (July 1975)
Sunfire	Shiro Yoshida	Giant-Size X-Men #1 (July 1975)
Colossus	Piotr "Peter" Nikolaievitch Rasputin	Giant-Size X-Men #1 (July 1975)
Thunderbird	John Proudstar	Giant-Size X-Men #1 (July 1975)

==== 1980s ====
1980s X-Men recruits
Character	Name	Joined in
Sprite / Ariel / Shadowcat / Shadowkat	Katherine "Kitty" Anne Pryde	X-Men #138 (October 1980)
Lockheed		Uncanny X-Men #168 (April 1983)
Rogue	Anna Marie LeBeau	Uncanny X-Men #171 (July 1983)
Phoenix / Marvel Girl / Prestige	Rachel "Ray" Anne Summers	Uncanny X-Men #193 (May 1985)
Magneto	Max Eisenhardt / Erik Magnus Lehnsherr	Uncanny X-Men #200 (December 1985)
Longshot		Uncanny X-Men Annual #10 (January 1987)
Psylocke	Elizabeth "Betsy" Braddock	Uncanny X-Men #213 (January 1987)
Dazzler	Alison Blaire	Uncanny X-Men #214 (February 1987)
Forge		Uncanny X-Men #255 (December 1989)

==== 1990s ====
1990s X-Men recruits
Character	Name	Joined in
Gambit	Remy Etienne LeBeau	Uncanny X-Men Annual #14 (January 1990)
Jubilee	Jubilation Lee	Uncanny X-Men #258 (February 1990)
Bishop	Lucas Bishop	Uncanny X-Men #287 (April 1992)
Revanche / Psylocke	Kwannon	X-Men, vol. 2 #21 (June 1993)
Cannonball	Samuel "Sam" Zachary Guthrie	X-Force #44 (July 1995)
Joseph		Uncanny X-Men #338 (November 1996)
Cecilia Reyes		X-Men, vol. 2 #70 (December 1997)
Marrow	Sarah "Rushman"	X-Men, vol. 2 #70 (December 1997)
Maggott	Japheth	X-Men, vol. 2 #70 (December 1997)

==== 2000s ====
2000s X-Men recruits
Character	Name	Joined in
Thunderbird	Neal Shaara	X-Men Unlimited #27 (June 2000)
Cable	Nathan Christopher Charles Summers	Uncanny X-Men #381 (June 2000)
Mirage	Danielle "Dani" Moonstar	X-Men, vol. 2 #102 (July 2000)
Sage	Tessa	X-Men, vol. 2 #109 (February 2001)
White Queen	Emma Grace Frost	New X-Men #116 (August 2001)
Xorn	Kuan-Yin Xorn	New X-Men Annual (September 2001)
Chamber	Jonothon "Jono" Evan Starsmore	Uncanny X-Men #398 (October 2001)
Stacy X	Miranda Leevald	Uncanny X-Men #400 (December 2001)
Lifeguard	Heather Cameron	X-Treme X-Men #10 (April 2002)
Slipstream	Davis "Davey" Cameron	X-Treme X-Men #10 (April 2002)
Northstar	Jean-Paul Beaubier	Uncanny X-Men #414 (December 2002)
Husk	Paige Elisabeth Guthrie	Uncanny X-Men #423 (May 2003)
Juggernaut	Cain Marko	Uncanny X-Men #425 (June 2003)
Xorn	Shen Xorn	X-Men, vol. 2 #162 (September 2004)
Mystique	Raven Darkhölme	X-Men, vol. 2 #181 (January 2006)
Petra		X-Men: Deadly Genesis #4 (February 2006, retconned to occur before Giant-Size X-Men #1)
Sway	Suzanne Chan	X-Men: Deadly Genesis #4 (February 2006, retconned to occur before Giant-Size X-Men #1)
Darwin	Armando Muñoz	X-Men: Deadly Genesis #4 (February 2006, retconned to occur before Giant-Size X-Men #1)
Vulcan	Gabriel Summers	X-Men: Deadly Genesis #4 (February 2006, retconned to occur before Giant-Size X-Men #1)
Warpath	James Proudstar	Uncanny X-Men #475 (July 2006)
Lady Mastermind	Regan Wyngarde	X-Men, vol. 2 #192 (October 2006)
Sabretooth	Victor Creed	X-Men, vol. 2 #192 (October 2006)
Omega Sentinel	Karima Shapandar	X-Men, vol. 2 #192 (October 2006)
Armor	Hisako Ichiki	Astonishing X-Men, vol. 3 #20 (February 2007)
Hepzibah		Uncanny X-Men #487 (June 2007)
Pixie	Megan Gwynn	X-Men Free Comic Book Day (April 2008)
Sunspot	Roberto "Bobby" da Costa	Secret Invasion: X-Men #1 (August 2008)
Karma	Xuân Cao Mạnh	Uncanny X-Men #501 (August 2008)
Aurora	Jeanne-Marie Beaubier	Secret Invasion: X-Men #2 (September 2008)
Doctor Nemesis	James Nicola Bradley	Uncanny X-Men #504 (November 2008)
Magma	Amara Juliana Olivians Aquilla	Secret Invasion: X-Men #4 (November 2008)
Madison Jeffries		Uncanny X-Men #505 (December 2008)
Magik	Illyana Nikolievna Rasputina	New Mutants, vol. 3 #1 (May 2009)
Sub-Mariner	Namor McKenzie	Uncanny X-Men #513 (July 2009)
Ariel		X-Men: Legacy #226 (July 2009)
Domino	Neena Thurman	Uncanny X-Men #514 (August 2009)
Cloak	Tyrone "Ty" Johnson	Dark Avengers #8 (August 2009)
Dagger	Tandy Bowen	Dark Avengers #8 (August 2009)
Boom-Boom	Tabitha Smith	Dark Avengers #8 (August 2009)
Danger		Uncanny X-Men #515 (September 2009)

==== 2010s ====
2010s X-Men recruits
Character	Name	Joined in
Cypher / Revelation	Douglas "Doug" Aaron Ramsey	New Mutants, vol. 3 #9 (January 2010)
Warlock		New Mutants, vol. 3 #9 (January 2010)
X-23 / Wolverine / Talon	Laura Kinney	X-Men: Second Coming #1 (March 2010)
Hope	Hope Summers (birth surname Spalding)	X-Men: Legacy #237 (June 2010)
Frenzy	Joanna Cargill	X-Men: Legacy #250 (June 2011)
Legion	David Charles Haller	X-Men: Legacy #250 (June 2011)
X-Man	Nathaniel "Nate" Grey	New Mutants, vol. 3 #33 (November 2011)
Warbird	Ava'Dara Naganandini	Astonishing X-Men, vol. 3 #48 (March 2012)
Blink	Clarice Ferguson	New Mutants, vol. 3 #45 (July 2012)
Firestar	Angelica Jones	Amazing X-Men, vol. 2 #1 (November 2013)
M / Penance	Monet Yvette Clarisse Maria Therese St. Croix	X-Men, vol. 4 #7 (November 2013)
Cerebra		Extraordinary X-Men #1 (November 2015)
Ink	Eric Gitter	X-Men Gold #17 (December 2017)
Honey Badger	Gabrielle "Gabby" Kinney	X-Men Red #1 (February 2018)
Pyro	Simon Lasker	X-Men Gold #23 (March 2018)
Trinary	Shilpa Khatri	X-Men Red #2 (March 2018)
Gentle	Nezhno Abidemi	X-Men Red #4 (May 2018)
Wolfsbane	Rahne Sinclair	Uncanny X-Men, vol. 5 #13 (March 2019)
Multiple Man	James "Jamie" Arthur Madrox	Uncanny X-Men, vol. 5 #13 (March 2019)

==== 2020s ====
2020s X-Men recruits
Character	Name	Joined in
Synch	Everett Thomas	X-Men, vol. 5 #21 (June 2021)
Prodigy	David Alleyne	X-Men: Hellfire Gala 2023 #1 (July 2023)
Rasputin IV		X-Men, vol. 6 #25 (August 2023)
Ms. Marvel	Kamala Khan	X-Men, vol. 6 #25 (August 2023)
Kid Omega	Quintavius "Quentin" Quirinius Quire	X-Men, vol. 7 #1 (July 2024)
Glob Herman	Robert Herman	X-Men, vol. 7 #1 (July 2024)
Temper	Idie Okonkwo	X-Men, vol. 7 #1 (July 2024)
Skin	Angelo Espinosa	Astonishing X-Men Infinity Comic, vol. 1 #14 (March 2025)
Animalia	Jennifer Starkey	X-Men, vol. 7 #21 (August 2025)
Bei the Blood Moon		X-Men, vol. 7 #22 (September 2025)
Quicksilver	Pietro Django Maximoff	Uncanny X-Men, vol.6 #29 (June 2026)
Ben Liu		X-Men, vol. 7 #31 (June 2026)
Greycrow	John Greycrow	X-Men, vol. 7 #39 (October 2026)

=== Other status ===
Other X-Men members with a different status
Character	Name	Joined in	Notes
Phoenix Force		X-Men #101 (October 1976)	A cosmic entity who joined the X-Men while impersonating Jean Grey.
Binary	Carol Susan Jane Danvers	Avengers Annual #10 (January 1981)	Honorary member
Dark Beast	Henry Philip McCoy	X-Men Unlimited #10 (March 1996)	Infiltrated the X-Men by replacing Beast of Earth-616.
Unidentified Skrull		Uncanny X-Men #370 (July 1999)	Infiltrated the X-Men by posing as Wolverine.
ForgetMeNot	Xabi	Sometime prior to X-Men: Legacy #300 (March 2014)	Kept being forgotten by the X-Men due to his mutant ability.
Lucid	Maya Jackson	Extraordinary X-Men #17 (December 2016)	A dying mutant made an honorary member of the X-Men.

== Substitute X-Men teams ==
Eleven substitute teams that have either temporarily taken the place of the X-Men during their absence, or worked under the X-Men.

=== New Mutants graduate X-Men ===
In January 1987, the New Mutants briefly graduated to become the X-Men in Uncanny X-Men Annual #10.

New Mutants graduate X-Men members
Character	Name
Cannonball	Samuel "Sam" Guthrie
Mirage	Danielle "Dani" Moonstar
Karma	Xuân Cao Mạnh
Magma	Amara Juliana Olivians Aquilla
Sunspot	Roberto "Bobby" da Costa
Magik	Illyana Nikolievna Rasputina
Cypher	Douglas "Doug" Aaron Ramsey
Warlock
Wolfsbane	Rahne Sinclair

=== Muir Island X-Men ===
In December 1989, during the wake of the X-Men's apparent death during "The Fall of the Mutants", Banshee assembled an X-Men team on Muir Island in Uncanny X-Men #254.

Original Muir Island X-Men members
Character	Name
Banshee	Sean Cassidy
Forge
Moira MacTaggert
Polaris	Lorna Sally Dane
Amanda Sefton	Jimaine Szardos
Sunder	Mark Hallett
Legion	David Charles Haller
Sharon Friedlander
Thomas "Tom" Corsi
Alysande Stuart

Muir Island X-Men recruits
Character	Name	Joined in
Multiple Man	James "Jamie" Arthur Madrox	Uncanny X-Men Annual #15 (June 1991)
Siryn	Theresa Rourke Cassidy	Uncanny X-Men Annual #15 (June 1991)

=== Phalanx invasion X-Men ===
In September 1993, to oppose the threat of the techno-organic alien Phalanx, an X-Men team quickly banded together in Uncanny X-Men #316.

Phalanx invasion X-Men members
Character	Name
Banshee	Sean Cassidy
Jubilee	Jubilation Lee
Sabretooth	Victor Creed
White Queen	Emma Grace Frost

=== Mannite rescue X-Men ===
In September 1999, after Professor X disbanded the X-Men in an attempt to expose a Skrull impostor in their ranks, Cyclops and Jean Grey formed an X-Men team to help the Mannites in Astonishing X-Men, vol. 2 #1.

Mannite rescue X-Men members
Character	Name
Cyclops	Scott Summers
Phoenix	Jean Elaine Grey
Archangel	Warren Kenneth Worthington III
Cable	Nathan Christopher Summers
X-Man	Nathaniel "Nate" Grey
Unidentified Skrull

=== Genoshan assault X-Men ===
In March 2001, Jean Grey assembled an X-Men team to rescue Professor X from Magneto in Uncanny X-Men #392.

Genosha assault X-Men members
Character	Name
Phoenix	Jean Elaine Grey
Dazzler	Alison Blaire
Northstar	Jean-Paul Beaubier
Omerta	Paul Provenzano
Wraith	Hector Rendoza
Sunpyre	Leyu Yoshida
Frenzy	Joanna Cargill

=== Street team X-Men ===
In November and December 2003, an X-Men team was formed by Cyclops in the wake of Xorn's rampage through Manhattan, New York in New X-Men #149 and #150.

Street X-Men members
Character	Name
Cyclops	Scott Summers
Fantomex	Charlie-Cluster 7
E.V.A.
Beak	Barnell Bohusk
Dust	Sooraya Qadir
Stepford Cuckoos	Celeste Cuckoo
Stepford Cuckoos	Irma "Mindee" Cuckoo
Stepford Cuckoos	Phoebe Cuckoo
Longneck	William Hanover
Forearm	Marcus Tucker
Choir	Irina Clayton

=== X-Men in training ===
Individuals who were once trained by the X-Men as part of younger teams of the X-Men or individually.

Trainees for the X-Men
Character	Name	Joined in
Dust	Sooraya Qadir	New X-Men, vol. 2 #23 (February 2006)
Elixir	Joshua "Josh" Foley	New X-Men, vol. 2 #23 (February 2006)
Hellion	Julian Keller	New X-Men, vol. 2 #23 (February 2006)
Mercury	Cessily Kincaid	New X-Men, vol. 2 #23 (February 2006)
Rockslide	Santo Vaccarro	New X-Men, vol. 2 #23 (February 2006)
Surge	Noriko "Nori" Ashida	New X-Men, vol. 2 #23 (February 2006)
X-23	Laura Kinney	New X-Men, vol. 2 #23 (February 2006)
Anole	Victor Borkowski	New X-Men, vol. 2 #41 (August 2007)
Pixie	Megan Gywnn	New X-Men, vol. 2 #41 (August 2007)
Gentle	Nezhno Abidemi	New X-Men, vol. 2 #41 (August 2007)
Prodigy	David Alleyne	New X-Men, vol. 2 #43 (October 2007)
Blindfold	Ruth Aldine	Young X-Men #1 (April 2008)
Wolf Cub	Nicholas Gleason	Young X-Men #1 (April 2008)
Ink	Eric Gitter	Young X-Men #1 (April 2008)
Graymalkin	Jonas Graymalkin	Young X-Men #6 (September 2008)
Cipher	Alisa Tager	Young X-Men #8 (November 2008)
Loa	Alani Ryan	Runaways #10 (May 2009)
Match	Ben Hammil	Runaways #10 (May 2009)
Bling!	Roxanne "Roxy" Washington	Dark Avengers/Uncanny X-Men: Utopia #1 (June 2009)
Onyxx	Sidney Green	Dark Avengers/Uncanny X-Men: Utopia #1 (June 2009)
Trance	Hope Abbott	Dark Avengers/Uncanny X-Men: Exodus #1 (September 2009)
Stepford Cuckoos	Celeste Cuckoo	
Stepford Cuckoos	Phoebe Cuckoo	
Stepford Cuckoos	Irma "Mindee" Cuckoo	
Indra	Paras Gavaskar	X-Men: Legacy #238 (July 2010)
Hope Summers		Uncanny X-Men #526 (July 2010)
Transonic	Laurie Tromette	Uncanny X-Men #526 (July 2010)
Velocidad	Gabriel Cohuelo	Uncanny X-Men #527 (August 2010)
Oya	Idie Okonkwo	Uncanny X-Men #528 (September 2010)
Primal	Teon Macik	Uncanny X-Men #529 (October 2010)
Zero	Kenji Uedo	Generation Hope #4 (February 2011)
No-Girl	Martha Johansson	Generation Hope #13 (November 2011)
Sebastian Hiram Shaw		Generation Hope #15 (January 2012)
Glob Herman	Robert Herman	Extraordinary X-Men #3 (December 2015)

=== X-Force ===
In December 2007, the X-Men's strike team was formed by Cyclops in Uncanny X-Men #493, with Wolverine serving as the field leader. The team took on missions which required responses "too violent or controversial" for the X-Men to deal with directly. When Cyclops disbanded the team, Wolverine assembled a new independent team.

Original X-Force members
Character	Name
Cyclops	Scott Summers
Wolverine	James "Logan" Howlett
Caliban
Hepzibah
Warpath	James Proudstar
Wolfsbane	Rahne Sinclair
X-23	Laura Kinney

X-Force recruits
Character	Name	Joined in
Archangel	Warren Kenneth Worthington III	X-Force, vol. 3 #2 (March 2008)
Elixir	Joshua "Josh" Foley	X-Force, vol. 3 #4 (May 2008)
Domino	Neena Thurman	X-Force, vol. 3 #8 (October 2008)
Vanisher	Telford Porter	X-Force, vol. 3 #9 (November 2008)

=== X-Club ===
In November 2008, Beast gathered a science team in Uncanny X-Men #504, to attempt to deal with the mutant birth crisis, and reverse the effects of M-Day. The team lasted until 2012.

Original X-Club members
Character	Name
Beast	Henry "Hank" Philip McCoy
Angel	Warren Kenneth Worthington III
Doctor Nemesis	James Bradley

X-Club recruits
Character	Name	Joined in
Madison Jeffries		Uncanny X-Men #505 (December 2008)
Yuriko Takiguchi		Uncanny X-Men #507 (March 2009)
Kavita Rao		Uncanny X-Men #508 (April 2009)
Psylocke	Elizabeth "Betsy" Braddock	Uncanny X-Men #512 (June 2009)

=== Time-displaced X-Men ===
In November 2012, a team was formed when the original members of X-Men were displaced in the time in All-New X-Men #1. The team headlined both All-New X-Men from 2012 to 2017 and X-Men Blue from 2017 to 2018.

Original time-displaced X-Men members
Character	Name
Cyclops	Scott Summers
Iceman	Robert "Bobby" Louis Drake
Beast	Henry "Hank" Philip McCoy
Marvel Girl / Phoenix	Jean Elaine Grey
Angel / Archangel	Warren Kenneth Worthington III

Time-displaced X-Men recruits
Character	Name	Joined in
Shadowcat	Katherine "Kitty" Anne Pryde	X-Men: Battle of the Atom #2 (October 2013)
X-23 / Wolverine	Laura Kinney	All-New X-Men #20 (December 2013)
Oya	Idie Okonkwo	All-New X-Men vol. 2 #1 (December 2015)
Genesis	Evan Sabahnur	All-New X-Men vol. 2 #1 (December 2015)
Pickles		All-New X-Men vol. 2 #1 (December 2015)
Magneto	Max Eisenhardt / Erik Magnus Lehnsherr	X-Men Blue #1 (April 2017)
Poison	James "Jimmy" Hudson Jr.	X-Men Blue #6 (June 2017)
Bloodstorm	Ororo Munroe	X-Men Blue #12 (September 2017)
Polaris	Lorna Sally Dane	X-Men Blue #25 (April 2018)
Xorn	Shen Xorn	X-Men Blue #25 (April 2018)
Daken	Akihiro	X-Men Blue #25 (April 2018)
Gazing Nightshade		X-Men Blue #25 (April 2018)

=== London X-Men ===
In July 2017, an X-Men team was formed to help Charles Xavier against the Shadow King in Astonishing X-Men, vol. 4 #1.

London X-Men members
Character	Name
X	Charles Francis Xavier
Archangel	Warren Kenneth Worthington III
Psylocke	Elizabeth "Betsy" Braddock
Bishop	Lucas Bishop
Old Man Logan	James "Logan" Howlett
Fantomex	Charlie-Cluster 7
Rogue	Anna Marie LeBeau
Gambit	Remy Etienne LeBeau
Mystique	Raven Darkhölme

== See also ==
- List of Xavier Institute students and staff
- List of X-Men enemies
- List of X-Force members
