= X-Corporation =

Fictional comic book organization

Publication information
- Publisher: Marvel Comics
- First appearance: New X-Men Annual #2001 (September 2001)
- Created by: Grant Morrison; Leinil Francis Yu

In-story information
- Type of organization: Support agency
- Base(s): Worldwide
- Leader(s): Professor X (founder)
- Agent(s): Domino (Hong Kong); Sunspot (Los Angeles); Warpath (Mumbai)

Roster

X-Corporation, or X-Corp, is a fictional institution appearing in American comic books published by Marvel Comics, commonly associated with the X-Men. Founded to ensure the protection of mutant rights throughout the world, the organization supported mutants against widespread bigotry and hate crimes.

== Publication history ==
X-Corp debuted in New X-Men Annual #2001 (September 2001) by Grant Morrison and Leinil Francis Yu, as a non-profit support agency for mutants across the globe. Following the House of M event, the agency was abandoned due to lack of staffing and attacks on facilities.

During the Krakoan Age, the X-Corporation was revived as a business to bring the medicine of Krakoa to other nations. A 2021 5-issue series was created by Tini Howard and Alberto Foche, with it initially being announced in 2019.

== Fictional history ==
X-Corp was founded by Prof. Charles Xavier, the founder of the X-Men, after the destruction of Genosha by his sister Cassandra Nova. Its purpose is to provide support for "civilian" mutant populations on a global scale in a world where the mutant population was outgrowing the reach of the X-Men. X-Corp offices are located in many major cities in every continent, and each office is managed by a former member of the X-Men or one of their satellite teams, such as Sunspot or Domino. The worldwide headquarters of the X-Corporation is the X-Mansion. X-Corp works with local governments, such as when they took in Molly Hayes on behalf of the Social Services of Los Angeles.

It should not be confused with the X-Corps, a short-lived paramilitary team led by Banshee, which merged with the X-Corporation after its dissolution, most of its members transferring to the Paris branch.

In the wake of the Decimation of mutantkind, wherein 90-95% of the mutant population was rendered genetically and physically human and thus powerless, several bombings occurred at X-Corporation locales. For the safety of those operating the facilities, and to regroup all empowered members, Cyclops ordered the evacuation of all X-Corp offices and the organization appears to be dead. With the minimal mutant population and the strict government rules imposed on mutants, the organization would serve no purpose.

== X-Corp (volume 1) ==
X-Corp

Publication information
- Publisher: Marvel Comics
- Schedule: Monthly
- No. of issues: 5 (as of June 23, 2021)
- Main character(s): Angel; Penance; Multiple Man; Trinary; Mastermind

Creative team
- Written by: Tini Howard
- Artist(s): Valentine De Landro; Alberto Foche
- Editor(s): Editor; Jordan D. White; Assistant Editor; Lauren Amaro; Head of X Jonathan Hickman

A business delegation representing the nation of Krakoa debuted as part of Reign of X in 2021. X-Corp will handle the mutantkind's business interests and has expanded into two branches:

- X-Corp Pharma: Research, development, and production of Krakoa's pharmaceuticals.
- X-Corp Telecom: Development of the Ionospheric Bandwidth Generator for faster communication. The mutant circuit of Vulcan, Bishop, Thunderbird and Sunspot activates the generator.

The Board of Director includes:

- Angel (Warren Worthington III) – Chairperson
- Penance (Monet St. Croix) – CXO
- Mastermind (Jason Wyngarde) – CXO
- Selene – CXO
- Trinary (Shilpa Khatri) – CXO

Other supporting members include Multiple Man, Jumbo Carnation, and Wind Dancer (Sofia Mantega).

=== Collected editions ===
#	Title	Material collected	Pages	Publication date	ISBN
1	X-Corp by Tini Howard – Volume 1	X-Corp #1–5	144	September 6, 2021	ISBN 978-1302930202

== Known locations and members ==
Branch	First appearance	Members
New York	New Mutants vol. 2 #13	Professor X (founder)
Amsterdam	New X-Men Annual 2001 (mentioned)	Unknown
Hong Kong	New X-Men Annual 2001	Domino • Risque
London		Unknown
Los Angeles	X-Treme X-Men #31	Empath • Magma • Skids (undercover S.H.I.E.L.D. agent) • Skitz • Stringfellow • Sunspot (former COO)
Melbourne	New X-Men Annual 2001 (mentioned)	Unknown
Mumbai	New X-Men #133 (destroyed in Excalibur vol. 2 #5)	Feral • Sunfire • Thornn • Warpath
Nairobi		Unknown
Paris	New X-Men #128 (bombed and destroyed on M-Day)	Cannonball • Darkstar • Holly (secretary) • M • Multiple Man • Rictor • Sabra • Siryn
Singapore	Excalibur vol. 2 #5	Lifeguard • Thunderbird (Neal Shaara)
Krakoa	X-Corp #1	Professor X • Cyclops • Archangel / Angel • M / Penance • Multiple Man • Selene • Trinary • Mastermind • Vulcan • Bishop • Thunderbird • Sunspot • Wind Dancer • Jumbo Carnation

== In other media ==
- X-Corp appears in X-Men '97. This version is based in Genosha.
- In the Marvel Trading Card Game, X-Corp is a scientific corporation controlled by the Hobgoblin.
