= Gentle (character) =

Marvel Comics superhero

- Gentle by Skottie Young

Publication information
- Publisher: Marvel Comics
- First appearance: New X-Men vol. 2 #23 (April 2006)
- Created by: Craig Kyle; Chris Yost; Mark Brooks

In-story information
- Alter ego: Nezhno "Nez" Abidemi
- Species: Human mutant
- Team affiliations: New X-Men; Storm's training squad Xavier Institute; X-Men-In-Training; Jean Grey School Students; Jean Grey's X-Men
- Abilities: Muscle mass expansion; Superhuman strength and durability; Vibranium tattoos

Gentle (Nezhno Abidemi) (Note: His forename is a Russian word meaning "tenderly", "gently". His surname is a Yoruban word meaning "born during father's absence".) is a character appearing in American comic books published by Marvel Comics. Originally from Wakanda, Gentle is a mutant with the ability to increase his muscle mass, giving him immense strength. The character has commonly been depicted as a member of the student body of the Xavier Institute and has also been part of the X-Men.

== Publication history ==
Gentle first appeared in New X-Men (vol. 2) #23 (April 2006), and was created by Craig Kyle, Christopher Yost, and Mark Brooks.

In January 2022, Marvel Comics ran a voting contest where voters could pick between one of ten characters to join the X-Men, with Gentle being among the candidates. In July 2022, Gentle appeared in a digital comic released as a companion to the second Hellfire Gala. This comic revealed that the election had also been held in-universe, with Gentle losing the vote.

== Fictional character biography ==
=== Xavier Institute / M-Day ===
Prior to M-Day, Nezhno Abidemi was part of Storm's squad. (Note: Nezhno's position as a member of Storm's former squad was revealed by his creators on the uncannyxmen.net forum.) He retains his powers following M-Day, when the Scarlet Witch removed the powers of most mutants on Earth, and remains at the Xavier Institute. When the remaining students compete to join the X-Men, Emma Frost does not allow Nezhno to participate.

It is later noted that Nezhno is from Wakanda, and he was the only student allowed to attend the wedding of Storm and the king of Wakanda, the Black Panther.

=== Quest for Magik ===
Nezhno is among the students who are listening to Blindfold's story about Magik, Belasco, and Limbo. He, with the other students are transported to Limbo. It is revealed that Nezhno's codename is Gentle and he has the ability to temporarily increase the mass of his muscles.

=== Messiah Complex ===
After escaping from Limbo, Nezhno goes into a deep meditative state to calm himself and to pray about his "violence" in defense of his friends. It is revealed that his power places strain on his body and could potentially kill him.

When a Sentinel attacks the Xavier Institute, Gentle pushes his powers to their limits to protect his fellow students, despite being warned against doing so by headmaster Scott Summers. He is attacked by the Sentinel and rendered unconscious.

When Predator X attacks the Institute, Gentle and Armor hold off the creature while Pixie teleports them to what remains of Muir Island. Once there, they continue their fight with Predator X.

=== Divided We Stand ===
Days after the events of "Messiah Complex", Nezhno returns to Wakanda. He is relieved to be free of the pestering of his former classmates, saying that they "nearly destroyed [him] with their insanity". During his return, he is ostracized by his fellow Wakandans, including his mother. His father was Russian, and therefore he is seen as an outsider. Nezhno reflects that the only people who accepted him were the New X-Men, and he regrets having pushed them away.

=== Worlds Apart ===
Nezhno kills a Wakandan priest and is then placed in jail; however, Storm does not believe he is responsible until she is shown security footage. Storm notices Nezhno acting out of character when he winks at the camera. She asks him to wink for her, but he does not know how to do so. Storm has Nezhno freed, declaring him innocent. Later the Black Panther orders his execution and winks at Storm. It is revealed Shadow King has possessed Nezhno and framed him. After the Shadow King is defeated, Nezhno returns to the United States.

=== Manifest Destiny and Utopia ===
After Norman Osborn declares martial law on San Francisco and the X-Men fight the Dark Avengers, Cyclops moves the mutants to Utopia, an artificial island off the coast of San Francisco. After a rogue Sentinel attacks Utopia, Gentle sides with Wolverine and moves to Westchester to enroll in the newly established Jean Grey School.

=== X-Men: Red Team ===
After Jean Grey is resurrected, Gentle joins her newly created Red Team, along with Storm, Namor, and Trinary.

During the arc The Long Shadow, Black Panther visits a terraformed Mars to talk to his ex-wife Storm. A secret meeting between T'Challa and Gentle reveals that Gentle had been part of a Wakandan sleeper agent program.

== Powers and abilities ==
Gentle uses his powers.

Gentle has the ability to temporarily increase the muscle mass of his body to extreme levels. He can will himself to immediately grow and strengthen to the extent that he can lift at least 100 tons. However, he cannot sustain his maximum strength for long since it causes massive strain on his body and leads to seizures. His vibranium tattoos help to keep his powers in check and glow when he is powered up.

Gentle once claimed to lack any sense of touch. It is later revealed that his pain at the use of his powers and his touch insensitivity stemmed from subconscious restraints he placed on himself due to the verbal and physical abuse he suffered from his mother. After overcoming his trauma with help from Jean Grey, Nezhno regains his sense of touch and can now use his powers without any detriment. According to Jean, Gentle is potentially powerful enough to go toe-to-toe with the Hulk.

=== Personality and beliefs ===
Nezhno is a calm and passive individual and is often seen meditating. Though not cold, he does not speak much. He seems to hold strong pacifistic beliefs and refrains from any sort of violence, though those may originate from the self-lethal nature of his mutation. His codename is taken from these beliefs.

== Other versions ==
An alternate universe version of Gentle appears in Age of X.

== In other media ==
- Gentle makes a non-speaking appearance in the X-Men '97 episode "Remember It".
- Gentle appears as a playable character in Marvel Contest of Champions.
