= Generation X (comics) =

Fictional comic book heroes

- Cover to Generation X #67 (September 2000). Art by Art Adams.

Publication information
- Publisher: Marvel Comics
- First appearance: Uncanny X-Men #318 (November 1994)
- Created by: Scott Lobdell; Chris Bachalo

In-story information
- Base(s): Massachusetts Academy

Generation X is a fictional superhero team appearing in American comic books published by Marvel Comics. A spin-off of the X-Men, the team was created by writer Scott Lobdell and artist Chris Bachalo. Generation X debuted during the 1994 "Phalanx Covenant" storyline, and appeared in their own monthly series in September 1994 with Generation X #1 (November 1994).

Generation X consisted of teenage mutants designed to reflect the cynicism and complexity of the series' namesake demographic. Unlike its predecessor the New Mutants, the team was not mentored by X-Men founder Charles Xavier at his New York estate, but by Banshee and former supervillainess Emma Frost at a splinter school in western Massachusetts.

== The team ==
=== Volume 1 ===
Promotional art of Generation X (1994 - 2001) comic book series. Art by Bryan Hitch.

Unlike the X-Men and New Mutants, Generation X did not attend Xavier's School for Gifted Youngsters in upstate New York or learn from Professor X himself. Instead, they trained at the Massachusetts Academy, located in Berkshire County, Massachusetts, and were mentored by Banshee, an Irish X-Man who possessed a "sonic scream", and the former villain White Queen, an aristocratic telepath.

Generation X consisted of:

- Chamber (Jonothon Starsmore), a British mutant who can produce blasts of energy from his upper chest. When his powers first manifested, they destroyed the lower half of his face and chest, leaving him only able to communicate via telepathy. Chamber is unable to eat, drink, or breathe, but no longer has to do so to survive. Because of this, he is characteristically sullen and bitter.
- Gaia, formerly the otherworldly Guardian of the Citadel of the Universal Amalgamator, which could potentially be misused to combine all sentient consciousnesses into a single entity.
- Husk (Paige Guthrie), a Kentucky coal miner's daughter who could shed her skin, revealing a different substance each time. She is the younger sister of the New Mutants' Cannonball, and elder sister of Icarus.
- Jubilee (Jubilation Lee), a Chinese-American "mall rat" from Beverly Hills, California who can produce explosive energy. Jubilee had been a junior member of the X-Men in the early 1990s, and joined Generation X to learn more about her powers.
- M (Monet St. Croix), a "perfect" young woman born into a rich family from Monaco who could fly, possessed super strength and had telepathic abilities. Her arrogant manner was an annoyance to her teammates and her habit of going into deep trances or fugue states when deep in thought was a mystery to her teachers. Mysteries surrounding the St. Croix family would play a big part in the series.
- Mondo, a cheerful, laidback Samoan mutant with the ability to replicate the texture of objects he touches.
- Penance, a silent, childlike and mysterious mutant who possessed diamond hard, red skin and razor-sharp claws. Penance appeared mysteriously at the Massachusetts Academy and at first, little was known about her. Penance was later revealed to be linked to M.
- Skin (Angelo Espinosa), a former reluctant teenage gang member on the streets of East Los Angeles who possesses six feet of extra skin. He can stretch his extremities, but mostly considers his mutation, which caused him to have sagging gray skin and painful headaches, a curse.
- Synch (Everett Thomas), an African-American teenager from St. Louis, known for his pleasant, supportive temperament, who can copy the powers of other mutants/superhumans within physical proximity.

Issues	Characters
#1-#3	Chamber, Husk, Jubilee, M, Skin, Synch.
#4-#5	Chamber, Husk, Jubilee, M, Skin, Synch, Penance.
#6-#7	Chamber, Husk, Jubilee, M, Skin, Synch, Penance, Artie Maddicks, Leech.
#8-#10	Chamber, Husk, Jubilee, M, Skin, Synch, Penance.
#11-#12	Chamber, Husk, Jubilee, M, Skin, Synch, Penance, Mondo.
#13	Chamber, Husk, Jubilee, M, Skin, Synch, Penance, Artie Maddicks, Leech, Mondo.
#14-#17	Chamber, Husk, Jubilee, M, Skin, Synch.
#18-#25	Chamber, Husk, Jubilee, M, Skin, Synch, Penance, Artie Maddicks, Leech, Mondo, Franklin Richards.
#26-#31	Chamber, Husk, Jubilee, M, Skin, Synch, Penance.
#32-#35	Chamber, Husk, Jubilee, Skin, Synch, Penance, M Twins.
#36-#40	Chamber, Husk, Jubilee, Skin, Synch, Penance, Artie Maddicks, Leech.
#41-#43	Chamber, Husk, Jubilee, M, Skin, Synch, Penance.
#44-#47	Chamber, Husk, Jubilee, M, Skin, Synch, Penance, Artie Maddicks, Leech, Gaia.
#48-#49	Chamber, Husk, Jubilee, M, Skin, Synch, Penance, Gaia, Maggott.
#50-#51	Chamber, Husk, Jubilee, M, Skin, Synch, Penance, Gaia.
#52-#56	Chamber, Husk, Jubilee, M, Skin, Synch, Penance, Artie Maddicks, Leech.
#57-#58	Chamber, Husk, Jubilee, M, Skin, Synch, Penance, Artie Maddicks, Leech, M Twins.
#59-#61	Chamber, Husk, Jubilee, Skin, Synch, Penance, Artie Maddicks, Leech.
#62-#66	Chamber, Husk, Jubilee, M, Skin.
#67-#69	Chamber, Husk, Jubilee, M, Skin, Synch, Penance, Artie Maddicks, Leech.
#70	Chamber, Husk, Jubilee, M, Skin, Synch.
#71-#75	Chamber, Husk, Jubilee, M, Skin.

=== Volume 2 ===
Following the war between the mutants and Inhumans, Kitty Pryde has Magik teleport X-Haven from Limbo to Central Park and renames it the Xavier Institute for Mutant Education and Outreach. Jubilee teaches one of the classes consisting of students who are considered liabilities during missions and with personalities ill-fitting of an ambassador.

- Bling! (Roxanne "Roxy" Washington), an openly bisexual student with body made of diamond-hard material.
- Eye-Boy (Trevor Hawkins), one of the new mutants to manifest their powers after the war between the X-Men and Avengers whose body is covered in eyeballs, which gives him expert marksman skills and the ability to see through illusions, track peoples auras, see electrical and magical waves, and spot people's weaknesses.
- Hindsight (Nathaniel Carver), a new student who can use psychometry to see someone's past through skin contact.
- Kid Omega (Quentin Quire), an Omega-level mutant possessing advanced cognitive and telepathic abilities.
- Morph (Benjamin Deeds), an average college student who has the power to shapeshift and chemically induce people into liking him.
- Nature Girl (Lin Li), a quiet student with heightened affinity for the natural world.

== After the series ==
=== Banshee ===
Banshee, distraught and possibly suffering from a breakdown, founds the X-Corps, a group of mutant adventurers who come into conflict with the X-Men over their questionable methodology and membership. Among the group are several former members of the Brotherhood of Mutants.

=== Chamber ===
Chamber starred in a four-issue mini-series, X-Men Icons: Chamber, written by Brian K. Vaughan. In it, he went undercover at Empire State University as a student to find out who killed six openly mutant students.

A mini-series titled Generation M debuted in November 2005, focusing on the after-effects from House of M, in which Scarlet Witch uses her hex/mutant powers to remove the powers of most mutants on Earth. The first issue reveals that Chamber lost his powers and was placed on life support due to no longer being able to sustain his body.

Chamber later showed up in New Excalibur #9 (2006), where it is revealed that his body was destroyed again after his powers grew out of control. Chamber is kidnapped by his doctor, Hartley, who takes him to Clan Akkaba. Clan Akkaba heals Chamber's body, transforming him into a grey-skinned form resembling Apocalypse. Chamber learns that he is a descendant of Clan Akkaba member Jack Starsmore and Apocalypse, but refuses to associate with the group.

Chamber appears in the series The New Warriors as a member of the eponymous group. As part of the New Warriors, he is known as Decibel and utilizes technology that gives him the ability to create solid energy projections and sonic blasts. Chamber was restored to his original appearance and powers after the Age of X storyline.

=== Emma Frost ===
Immediately after Generation X's cancellation, Emma Frost became a core member of Grant Morrison's New X-Men team, where she demonstrated the secondary mutation of being able to transform her body into diamond. During this time, she also began a romantic relationship with Cyclops. She has remained a central figure in nearly every incarnation of the X-Men since.

=== Husk ===
Husk, along with Jubilee and M, appeared as part of Banshee's X-Corps, dubbed "Banshee's Angels". After Banshee is badly injured by Mystique, Husk returns to the X-Men's school in Westchester. She appears as a regular cast member in Uncanny X-Men under writer Chuck Austen, and briefly flirts with Angel despite being many years younger than him. Husk sided with Wolverine in the X-Men's "Schism", where she served as a faculty member at the Jean Grey School for Higher Learning in Wolverine and the X-Men. She begins to lose control of her powers, and when questioned by Shadowcat, abruptly quits her position.

=== Jubilee ===
Jubilee made several appearances in Uncanny X-Men following the end of Generation X, where she appeared first as a member of Banshee's X-Corps alongside M and Husk and later as an ancillary character in Chuck Austen's run.

Jubilee briefly had her own self-titled series, written by Robert Kirkman. While it was originally intended to be an ongoing series aimed at the teen market, launched as part of Marvel Comics' Tsunami line, it was retroactively dubbed a mini-series and canceled with issue #6, due to disappointing sales.

Jubilee was depowered during the "Decimation" storyline and laments her lost powers, but is reluctant to ask Wolverine for help, convincing herself that she needs to grow up and handle it herself. Jubilee later appears as a member of the New Warriors; as part of the group, she is known as Wondra and utilizes gauntlets which give her superhuman strength.

During the "Curse of the Mutants" storyline, Jubilee became a vampire. A subsequent four-issue mini-series, Wolverine and Jubilee, detailed her process of coming to terms with this change, and she remains a central cast member in X-Men, having adopted a baby named Shogo. Jubilee is cured of her vampirism by Quentin Quire using a portion of the Phoenix Force.

=== M ===
M appeared for a time as part of Banshee's X-Corps along with Husk and Jubilee, following which she became an employee of X-Factor Investigations, in X-Factor (vol. 3). She is an instrumental part of many of their investigations and, along with Strong Guy, considered the muscle of the group. After being seduced by a dupe of Multiple Man's, she develops a romantic interest in him, but his feelings laid with her teammate Siryn, which leads to friction within the group. She has since made peace with both Siryn and Madrox. M appeared as a central character in Magneto's Uncanny X-Men.

=== Penance ===
Penance (now renamed "Hollow") appeared in the limited series Loners, where she was held captive by a ring of drug makers in order to harvest her genetics to create Mutant Growth Hormone. She was accidentally freed by Ricochet. After a battle with a crazed Phil Urich, she left, following him. She re-appeared in late 2011 as a new student at Avengers Academy.

=== Skin ===
Jubilee and Skin were shown to be living in LA in a story in the anthology series X-Men Unlimited, sharing an apartment and attempting to adjust to civilian life. They are both attacked by a mutant hate group, with Skin being crucified on the X-Men's front lawn and killed. Skin was resurrected on Krakoa.

=== Synch ===
Having died near the end of Generation X, Synch was one of the first mutants resurrected on Krakoa. He is placed on a team along with Darwin and Wolverine that was sent to the Vault, a pocket dimension with a vastly accelerated flow of time and home to dangerous superhumans, with the intent of gaining information. While approximately three months had passed in the real world, more than five hundred years pass in the Vault before Synch and the others escape and relay the information back to the X-Men.

== Members ==
Character	Alter ego	Joined in
Banshee	Sean Cassidy	Generation X #1 (1994)
White Queen	Emma Frost	Generation X #1 (1994)
Skin	Angelo Espinosa	Generation X #1 (1994)
Synch	Everett Thomas	Generation X #1 (1994)
M	Monet Yvette Clarisse Maria Therese St. Croix (Claudette & Nicole)	Generation X #1 (1994)
Husk	Paige Guthrie	Generation X #1 (1994)
Jubilee	Jubilation Lee	Generation X #1 (1994)
Chamber	Jonothon Starsmore	Generation X #1 (1994)
Blink	Clarice Ferguson	Uncanny X-Men #317 (1994)
Penance	Monet St. Croix / Yvette	Generation X #3 (1995)
Mondo		Generation X Annual '95 (1995)
Gaia		Generation X #43 (1998)
Wards
Leech		Generation X #5 (1995)
Artie Maddicks	Arthur Maddicks	Generation X #5 (1995)
Franklin Richards		Generation X #20 (1996)
M-Twins	Claudette & Nicole St. Croix	
Allies
Gateway		Generation X #1 (1994)
Maggott	Japheth	
Generation X (2017)
Jubilee	Jubilation Lee	Generation X, vol. 2 #1 (2017)
Bling!	Roxanne "Roxy" Washington	Generation X, vol. 2 #1 (2017)
Kid Omega	Quentin Quire	Generation X, vol. 2 #1 (2017)
Nature Girl	Lin Li	Generation X, vol. 2 #1 (2017)
Morph	Benjamin Deeds	Generation X, vol. 2 #1 (2017)
Hindsight	Nathaniel Carver	Generation X, vol. 2 #1 (2017)
Eye-Boy	Trevor Hawkins	Generation X, vol. 2 #1 (2017)

== Publications ==
=== List of titles ===
- Generation X Collector's Preview (October 1994, Marvel Comics)
- Generation X #−1 & 1–75 (July 1997 & November 1994 – June 2001, Marvel Comics)
- Generation X Annual 1995–1997, 1999 (September 1995 – November 1999, Marvel Comics)
- Generation X/Dracula Annual 1998 (October 1998, Marvel Comics)
- Generation X 1/2 (July 1998, Marvel Comics & Wizard Magazine)
- Generation X San Diego Comic Con 1/2 (July 1994, Marvel Comics, Overstreet)
- Generation X Holiday Special (February 1998, Marvel Comics)
- Generation X Underground Special (May 1998, Marvel Comics)

=== Novels ===
- Generation X (1997, Berkley) by Scott Lobdell and Elliot S. Maggin, illustrated by Tom Grummett and Doug Hazlewood (ISBN 1-57297-223-8)
- Generation X: Crossroads (1998, Berkley) by J. Steven York (ISBN 0-425-16631-7)
- Generation X: Genogoths (2000, Berkley) by J. Steven York, illustrated by Mark Buckingham (ISBN 0-425-17143-4)

== Adaptations ==
- Generation X appears in a self-titled television pilot, consisting of M, Skin, Mondo, Jubilee, and original characters Buff and Refrax.
- In 1999, Generation X was considered to be adapted into a live-action series, which went unproduced.
- An alternate universe iteration of Generation X appears in X-Men '92, consisting of Jubilee, Chamber, Husk, Skin, and M. Additional members introduced later include Synch, Leech, Artie Maddicks, Blink and members from the main universe X-Statix (Dead Girl, Doop, Orphan, U-Go Girl, and Vivisector).
