= Generation X (film) =

- Promotional release poster
- Genre: Superhero
- Based on: Generation X by: Scott Lobdell; Chris Bachalo
- Written by: Eric Blakeney
- Directed by: Jack Sholder
- Starring: Matt Frewer; Finola Hughes
- Music by: J. Peter Robinson
- Country of origin: United States
- Original language: English

Production
- Executive producers: Avi Arad; Eric Blakeney; Stan Lee; Bruce J. Sallan
- Producer: David Roessell
- Production location: Vancouver
- Cinematography: Bryan England
- Editor: Michael Schweitzer
- Running time: 87 minutes
- Production companies: MT2 Services, Inc.; Marvel Studios; Marvel Entertainment; New World Pictures; Fox Film
- Budget: $4 million

Original release
- Network: Fox Broadcasting Company
- Release: February 20, 1996

Generation X is a 1996 American television pilot directed by Jack Sholder that aired on Fox on February 20, 1996. It was later broadcast as a television film. It is based on the Marvel comic book series of the same name, a spin-off of the X-Men franchise. It was produced by New World Entertainment and Marvel Entertainment Group.

== Plot ==
Rebellious teenager Jubilation Lee finds herself in trouble after her mutant "fireworks" power manifests itself at a local arcade. She is rescued from her predicament by Emma Frost and Sean Cassidy, the headmasters of Xavier's School for Gifted Youngsters. They recruit "Jubilee" and offer her sanctuary at the school, a place where mutants learn to control their powers. The trio then picks up teenager Angelo "Skin" Espinosa and proceeds to the school where Jubilee and Skin are introduced to their fellow students: M, Mondo, Buff, and Refrax. At the school, the students are taught not only to cope with their mutant powers but also with a world that fears and hates them. The students are warned not to leave the school grounds lest they come into conflict with the "townies" from the local area.

In addition to coping with their new abilities, Jubilee and Skin find their dreams haunted by Russel Tresh, a mad scientist obsessed with the power of dreams. Tresh once worked with Emma Frost as a researcher on a project to develop a "dream machine" to access the dream dimension, but he was fired from the team when Emma discovered his unethical behavior. Tresh believes that material extracted from mutants' brains will allow him to develop his own psychic abilities. Although Jubilee is able to resist Tresh somewhat, Skin finds himself drawn to Tresh and his promises, and unknowingly falls victim to the scientist. Instructors Frost and Cassidy soon find themselves leading the novice team against an enhanced Tresh to rescue Skin, a conflict which sees the youngsters pull together as a team and leaves Tresh trapped in the "dream dimension".

=== Film prologue ===
The following is a prologue quote that appeared at the beginning of the film, which was later emulated in the X-Men theatrical films with similar defining quotes on mutation and evolution, respectively, albeit in voice-over rather than on-screen text:

Mutation: n. 1. The act of being altered or changed. 2. The illegal genetic condition [US Statute 5504178], first apparent in puberty, caused by the X factor located in the pineal gland of the brain.

== Cast ==
- Finola Hughes as Emma Frost / White Queen: She runs the Xavier's School for Gifted Youngsters with Banshee. She takes her job very seriously and wants to make sure that the students are sufficiently trained for any situation. Part of the reason for this may be because in her past, she trained another group called the Hellions, whose loss she blames herself for. Her powers include mind control. A natural brunette, Hughes wore a blonde wig for the role, and would joke that as a Size 34B, she struggled to stay true to her comic counterpart's cleavage.
- Jeremy Ratchford as Sean Cassidy / Banshee, an Irish mutant, runs the Xavier's School for Gifted Youngsters with Emma Frost. Sean is much more laid-back in his teaching approach than Emma and wants to make sure that the students bond as a team. He can produce a sonic scream that can stun people. Ratchford described the character as "more warmly paternal than Emma", and claimed he had come close to being cast as the voice of Wolverine in X-Men: The Animated Series.
- Amarilis as Monet Yvette Clarisse Maria Therese St. Croix / M, one of the students at the Xavier's School for Gifted Youngsters, she claims that she is the perfect mutant; super intelligent, enhanced physical abilities and "level eight invulnerability".
- Heather McComb as Jubilation Lee / Jubilee, the newest student at the Xavier's School for Gifted Youngsters, she is highly intelligent and very curious. She can generate brightly colored bursts of plasma energy, which she can fire from her hands. She also seems to have some psychic abilities.
- Bumper Robinson as Mondo, one of the students at the Xavier's School for Gifted Youngsters, he is hot-headed and gets into fights easily. He can take on the properties of any organic or inorganic matter he touches.
- Agustin Rodriguez as Angelo Espinosa / Skin: He has skin that can stretch in a variety of different ways, including the ability to wrap himself around objects. He has a younger sister, whom Russel Tresh threatened if Skin didn't obey him. He seems to have some psychic abilities. Rodriguez was suggested to the producers after being spotted in an episode of New York Undercover.
- Suzanne Davis as Arlee Hicks / Buff, one of the students at the Xavier's School for Gifted Youngsters, is a friendly person whose mutation increases her muscle mass and strength. She is insecure about her physique and wears loose clothing to cover it up.
- Randall Slavin as Kurt Pastorius / Refrax, one of the students at the Xavier's School for Gifted Youngsters, his eyes emit radiation, giving him X-ray vision and heat beams. He is a practical joker who has a crush on Buff. He wears special glasses to control his powers and is best friends with Mondo. Slavin noted that the producers were initially after a jock-type for the role, but instead found him after deciding to go with a "skinny, weak, short-haired guy". He described the character as an "all-round frat, skate punk, lustful guy".
- Matt Frewer as Russel Tresh, an unethical scientist and researcher who is investigating subliminal and psychic powers. He worked on a project with Emma Frost, who got him fired for his unethical behavior. Following this, he put his talents towards the advertising industry, where he used the money to build a machine to access the "dream dimension". Producer Eric Blakeney was delighted to get Frewer for the role, having worked with him on Max Headroom. Frewer described Tresh as "very childish... He's kind of a genius gone wrong, and is very spiteful".

== Production ==
=== Development ===
The film was planned to air during sweeps as Fox was confident it would make a strong impact, and had a budget of over $4m. Producer Eric Blakeney hoped it would lead to further Generation X TV movies, or a full series. New World Enterprises kept strong security over the script, which was not allowed to be viewed by the press. Blakeney had previously worked on 21 Jump Street, and saw common ground between the teenage mutants and real-life teenagers, noting "I remember what it was like to be a teenager, and everything is wrong in your skin." Director Jack Sholder had experience on a comics property before, having directed an episode of Tales from the Crypt, which was loosely inspired by EC Comics' horror comic of the same name.

Budgetary reasons meant a direct translation of the comic was impossible. The most notable casualties were the characters of Chamber and Husk, whose powers involve drastic alterations to their bodies and would be difficult to depict in live-action. Instead, the film's producers consulted with Generation X comic writer Scott Lobdell to create two new characters - Refrax and Buff, and suggested that if they proved popular they might be added to the comic itself, and featured in Toy Biz's X-Men action figure range.

Other changes were made to the characters in the development of this film. Jubilee, for example, was not portrayed as a character of Asian descent, despite the X-Men comics and broadcast series having portrayed her as Chinese American. Ironically, Sandra Oh auditioned for the part of Emma Frost.

=== Filming ===
The film was shot in British Columbia over the course of 24 days. Hatley Castle was used to depict the Xavier Institute, and would continue to do so in the films X2, X-Men: The Last Stand, Deadpool, and Deadpool 2.

== Release ==
Just before the release, the TV special was testing the waters for a series of TV movies instead of a TV series. Generation X was broadcast on Fox as part of the Fox Tuesday Night at the Movies on February 20, 1996. The movie tied for 72nd out of 108 Nielsen-rated programmes.
