= Amarilis (actress) =

American television actress

Amarilis Rivera (often credited as Amarilis) is an American television and stage actress. She was born in New York City.

== Career ==
Amarilis studied acting at junior college and worked as a model before she made her acting debut in the recurring role of Patty Gilbert in the syndicated TV series Sweet Valley High (1994–1995). In 1996, she portrayed the Marvel Comics superheroine Monet "M" St. Croix in the television movie Generation X.

In 2022, Amarilis appeared in a stage production of Charlotte's Web with the Lieder Theatre Company in Goulburn, New South Wales. In 2024 she performed with the same company in a production of Fox on the Fairway.

== Filmography ==
Year	Title	Role	Notes
1994–95	Sweet Valley High	Patty Gilbert	Recurring role, 22 episodes
1995	The Fresh Prince of Bel-Air	Leslie	"Get a Job"
1996	Dream On	Heidi	"The Way We War"
1996	Generation X	Monet St. Croix	TV film
1997	Smart Guy	Natasha	"Don't Do That Thing You Do"
1998	Guys Like Us	Nina	"Maestro's Big Break"
