= Stacy X =

Marvel Comics superhero

Publication information
- Publisher: Marvel Comics
- First appearance: Uncanny X-Men #399 (November 2001)
- Created by: Joe Casey; Tom Raney

In-story information
- Alter ego: Miranda Leevald
- Species: Human mutant
- Team affiliations: New Warriors; X-Men; X-Ranch
- Notable aliases: Ripcord
- Abilities: Pheromone manipulation; Scaly skin enhancing durability; Skilled hand-to-hand fighter

Stacy X (Miranda Leevald) is a fictional character appearing in American comic books published by Marvel Comics. Created by writer Joe Casey and artist Tom Raney, she first appeared in Uncanny X-Men #399 (November 2001), when she was known as X-Stacy, and later became known as Ripcord. Stacy X belongs to the subspecies of humans called mutants, who are born with superhuman abilities. She was briefly affiliated with the X-Men and was later known as a member of the New Warriors.

== Publication history ==
Stacy X first appeared in Uncanny X-Men #399 (November 2001), and was created by Joe Casey and Tom Raney.

== Fictional character biography ==
Stacy-X is a mutant with the ability to exude pheromones which she could control to stimulate bodily sensations and functions of others. She also possesses patterned, snake-like skin.

Stacy first appears as a member of the Nevada mutant brothel, the X-Ranch. After the hate group the Church of Humanity destroys the ranch, Stacy joins the X-Men. Forthright and argumentative, Stacy did not take easily to teamwork and left the team shortly after joining. She plays a vital role in fighting Black Tom, using her powers to seduce him and releasing the other trapped X-Men, allowing them to defeat him. She also proved to be a highly skilled fighter, even giving Wolverine a proper workout. Where she got this training is unknown, much like everything else about her past.

Soon after the events at the X-Ranch, Stacy stayed at the Institute. She took some time off after "servicing a special client" in Chappaqua, New York. Wolverine tracked her down and fought with her, but soon the two came to an understanding. Whether Wolverine convinced Stacy to completely abandon her former profession is unknown, but he did talk Nightcrawler out of whatever censure he was contemplating. It was known that Stacy continued to work for "special clients" even as she operated as a member of the X-Men.

After a spat with Paige Guthrie / Husk, caused by the fact that they both had feelings for Archangel, Stacy decides to leave the mansion. However, she gives Archangel a video of herself jumping rope naked, stating that she did not want to stay around them. Rather, this will indicate to him that he missed the chance to have had someone as sexy as herself as a girlfriend, instead of Paige.

=== Decimation and New Warriors ===
Due to the Scarlet Witch's magic, Stacy is one of the many mutants to lose her powers after the events of Decimation. She becomes a member of the reformed New Warriors under the codename Ripcord. The circumstances of how she joined are not completely revealed, but her attitude and statements show that she wanted to change her life, and going back to being a hero seems like the path she chose best to do it. Besides being given artificial powers to replace what she lost, she apparently also has lost her leftover scaled skin. She is killed in an accident along with Skybolt.

=== Vengeance ===
Stacy X mysteriously re-appears later. She is shown having a three-way sexual encounter with Welsh pop star Sugar Kane (Chamber's onetime girlfriend) and new character Ultimate Nullifier in a high-rise hotel room after they are at a nightclub. The trio is interrupted by the sudden arrival of Magneto, who seeks to discipline Stacy for what he considers to be her disgraceful decadence which is embarrassingly tarnishing the collective image of Earth's remaining mutants. Magneto proceeds to magnetically thrash the room and toss all of them around. However, Ultimate Nullifier engages in combat with Magneto while Stacy and Kane escape. Successfully subduing Magneto by depowering him with a power-dampening gun and beating him with formidable martial arts skills, Ultimate Nullifier then reveals to Magneto that he was secretly acting as a bodyguard to Stacy and that it is his mission to protect her from Magneto.

=== Krakoa ===
Stacy X is one of the mutants living on the island nation of Krakoa. There, Stacy comes into some conflict with Nightcrawler, first by handing out contraceptives in seeming contravention of Krakoa's First Law, "Make more mutants," and then by revealing that she runs 'The Bower', which Nightcrawler initially confuses for a brothel. While sex is allowed at the Bower, Stacy describes it as closer to a combination of a temple to intimacy and an orphanage for abandoned mutant children. Stacy X criticizes the Krakoan Quiet Council for not allowing or having a structure for adoption of mutant babies. Later, the Bower is infiltrated by three XENO agents, who kidnap three of the mutant infants.

== Powers and abilities ==
Stacy X can produce sensations and physical reactions in anyone, such as orgasms, vomiting or adrenaline rushes, and can heal others by speeding up their healing process, due to the pheromones she secretes. Initially, she had to make physical contact to produce these sensations and physical reactions. Later, she became able to influence others without making direct contact with others, by launching her pheromones through the air.

Stacy X has a scaly, snake-like skin, which increases her durability, although the limit of her durability has never been demonstrated.

Additionally, she is an expert fighter, having some martial arts abilities, and was able to even challenge Wolverine.

== Reception ==
=== Accolades ===
- In 2010, ComicsAlliance ranked Stacy X 3rd in their "5 Superheroes Who Used Their Powers For Sex" list.
- In 2014, Entertainment Weekly ranked Stacy X 92nd in their "Let's rank every X-Man ever" list.
- In 2014, BuzzFeed ranked Stacy X 84th in their "95 X-Men Members Ranked From Worst To Best" list.
- In 2017, Screen Rant included Stacy X in their "15 Superheroes Marvel Wants You To Forget" list.
- In 2018, DirecTV included Stacy X in their "8 Marvel Characters That Should Join Deadpool Movie Universe" list.
- In 2020, Scary Mommy included Stacy X in their "Looking For A Role Model? These 195+ Marvel Female Characters Are Truly Heroic" list.
- in 2021, Looper included Stacy X in their "Best Marvel Mutant Powers Not Used For Fighting" list.

== Other versions ==
An alternate universe version of Stacy X from Earth-1610 appears in Ultimate X-Men.

== In other media ==
- Stacy X was originally supposed to appear in X-Men: The Last Stand, with Dania Ramirez auditioning for the role. However, the producers were unable to find an actress to play the character and instead had Ramirez play Callisto.
- Stacy X makes a cameo appearance in the X-Men '97 episode "To Me, My X-Men".
