= List of X-Force members =

X-Force is a team of superheroes published in American comic books by Marvel Comics. Over the decades, X-Force have featured a rotating line up composed of large number of mutant characters.

Notations:

- A slash (/) between names, indicates the character having multiple codenames during their tenure of X-Force in chronological order.
- Characters listed in **bold** are the current members of the team.
  - In case of multiple codenames, the currently used name is bolded.
- Characters listed are set in the Earth-616 continuity except when noted.

== Founding members ==
In April 1991, the members of the New Mutants changed team name and founded X-Force in New Mutants #100.

Character	Name
**Boom-Boom** / Meltdown	Tabitha Smith
Cable	Nathan Christopher Charles Summers
Cannonball	Samuel "Sam" Zachary Guthrie
**Shatterstar**	Gaveedra Seven
Feral	Maria Callasantos
**Warpath**	James Proudstar

== Recruits ==
=== 1990s recruits ===
Character	Name	Joined in
Siryn	Theresa Rourke Cassidy	X-Force #3 (October 1991)
**Rictor**	Julio Esteban Richter	X-Force #10 (May 1992)
Sunspot	Roberto "Bobby" da Costa	X-Force #16 (October 1992)
**Domino** (Note: These X-Force members were also the only members of X-Men's strike team: Archangel, Caliban, Cyclops, Domino, Elixir, Hepzibah, Vanisher, Wolfsbane, Wolverine and X-23.)	Neena Thurman	X-Force #29 (December 1993)
Caliban		X-Force #44 (July 1995)
Danielle Moonstar		X-Force #68 (August 1997)
Bedlam	Jesse Aaronson	X-Force #84 (December 1998)

=== 2000s recruits ===
During late 2000s, the X-Men's strike team was formed by Cyclops in Uncanny X-Men #493, with Wolverine serving as the field leader. The team took on missions which required responses "too violent or controversial" for the X-Men to deal with directly. When Cyclops disbanded the team, Wolverine assembled a new independent team.

Character	Name	Joined in
Peter "Pete" Paul Wisdom		X-Force #102 (May 2000)
Cyclops	Scott Summers	Uncanny X-Men #493 (December 2007)
Hepzibah		Uncanny X-Men #493 (December 2007)
Wolfsbane	Rahne Sinclair	Uncanny X-Men #493 (December 2007)
Wolverine	James "Logan" Howlett	Uncanny X-Men #493 (December 2007)
X-23 / Wolverine	Laura Kinney	Uncanny X-Men #493 (December 2007)
**Archangel**	Warren Kenneth Worthington III	X-Force, vol. 3 #2 (March 2008)
Elixir	Joshua "Josh" Foley	X-Force, vol. 3 #4 (May 2008)
Vanisher	Telford Porter	X-Force, vol. 3 #9 (November 2008)

=== 2010s recruits ===
Character	Name	Joined in
Cypher	Douglas "Doug" Aaron Ramsey	X-Force, vol. 3 #27 (May 2010)
Deadpool	Wade Winston Wilson	X-Men: Second Coming #2 (July 2010)
Fantomex	Charlie-Cluster 7	X-Men: Second Coming #2 (July 2010)
Psylocke / Captain Britain	Elizabeth "Betsy" Braddock	X-Men: Second Coming #2 (July 2010)
Deathlok Prime		Uncanny X-Force #8 (April 2011)
Nightcrawler	Kurt Darkhölme	Uncanny X-Force #19 (December 2011)
Colossus / Tank	Piotr "Peter" Nikolaievitch Rasputin	Cable & X-Force #1 (December 2012)
Doctor Nemesis	James Nicola Bradley	Cable & X-Force #1 (December 2012)
Forge		Cable & X-Force #1 (December 2012)
Hope Summers		Cable & X-Force #14 (September 2013)
Storm	Ororo Munroe	Uncanny X-Force, vol. 2 (January 2013–January 2014)
Puck	Eugene Milton Judd	Uncanny X-Force, vol. 2 (January 2013–January 2014)
Bishop	Lucas Bishop	Uncanny X-Force, vol. 2 (January 2013–January 2014)
Spiral	Rita Wayword	Uncanny X-Force, vol. 2 (January 2013–January 2014)
Marrow	Sarah	X-Force, vol. 4 #1 (February 2014)
ForgetMeNot	Xabi	X-Force, vol. 4 #15 (February 2015)
Beast	Henry "Hank" Philip McCoy	X-Force, vol. 6 #1 (November 2019)
Black Tom	Thomas Samuel Eamon Cassidy	X-Force, vol. 6 #1 (November 2019)
Marvel Girl	Jean Elaine Grey	X-Force, vol. 6 #1 (November 2019)
Sage	Teresia Karisik	X-Force, vol. 6 #1 (November 2019)
Kid Omega	Quintavius "Quentin" Quirinius Quire	X-Force, vol. 6 #2 (November 2019)

=== 2020s recruits ===
Character	Name	Joined in
Tommy		Inferno, vol. 2 #1 (September 2021)
Omega Red	Arkady Gregorivich Rossovich	X-Force, vol. 6 #27 (April 2022)
Phoebe Cuckoo		Wolverine, vol. 7 #48 (April 2024)
Askani	Rachel "Ray" Anne Grey (birth surname Summers)	X-Force, vol. 7 #1 (July 2024)
Surge	Noriko "Nori" Ashida	X-Force, vol. 7 #1 (July 2024)
**Hellverine**	Akihiro	Inglorious X-Force #1 (January 2026)
**Ms. Marvel**	Kamala Khan	Inglorious X-Force #1 (January 2026)
**Pug-Smasher**	Karl Snortenthau	Inglorious X-Force #8 (August 2026)

== Infiltrators ==
Character	Name	Joined in	Notes
Copycat	Vanessa Geraldine Carlysle	New Mutants #100 (April 1991)	Infiltrated by replacing Domino.
Catharsix		Inglorious X-Force #1 (January 2026)	Infiltrated by possessing Cable.

== Allies ==
Character	Name	Joined in
Lila Cheney		X-Force #19 (1992)
Prosh	Also known as the Professor	X-Force #39 (1994)
X-Treme	Adam Neramani	X-Force Annual #2
Risque	Gloria Dolores Muñoz	X-Force #51 (1996)
MeMe		X-Force, vol. 4 #2 (2014)
