= X-Men Red =

Comic book series

- Cover to X-Men: Red #1, art by Travis Charest

Publication information
- Publisher: Marvel Comics
- Schedule: Monthly
- Publication date: (vol. 1); February–December 2018 (vol. 2); April 2022–December 2023
- No. of issues: (vol. 1); 11 (vol. 2); 18
- Main character: See below
- ISSN: 2690-9863

Creative team
- Written by: (vol. 1); Tom Taylor (vol. 2); Al Ewing
- Artist(s): (vol. 1); Mahmud Asrar; Carmen Carnero; Rogê Antônio (vol. 2); Stefano Caselli; Juan Cabal; Andrés Genolet; Michael Sta. Maria; Madibek Musabekov; Jacopo Camagni; Yıldıray Çınar

X-Men: Red is an American comic book series published by Marvel Comics, featuring characters from X-Men stories.

The first series was an eleven-issue comic book series published by Marvel Comics in monthly installments between February and December 2018. It was written by Tom Taylor and illustrated by Mahmud A. Asrar. The book followed a new team of X-Men led by Jean Grey following her return in Phoenix Resurrection: The Return of Jean Grey.

The second series featured the conflicting mutant factions on the terraformed Mars, renamed Arakko.

== Publication history ==
=== Volume 1 ===
X-Men: Red is part of the X-Men franchise and a sister book to X-Men Gold and X-Men Blue, which began ten months earlier. It follows the events of the 2017–2018 miniseries Phoenix Resurrection: The Return of Jean Grey written by Matthew Rosenberg and illustrated by Leinil Francis Yu. The series was promoted as part of Marvel's Fresh Start, a full company relaunch of publications. The first issue, released February 7, 2018, was written by Tom Taylor and illustrated by Mahmud Asrar. It was available in ten different variant covers. Taylor's initial plans for the series did not involve any crossovers with other comic series.

Jean Grey, a character recently resurrected after being dead for over a decade, assembles a new team with the intent to create a mutant nation. Her initial allies are Nightcrawler, Wolverine, Honey Badger, Gentle, Trinary, and Namor. They use Atlantis as their headquarters. After she attempts to convince the UN to recognize the mutant race as a nation with full human rights, Jean is framed for the murder of an English congresswoman by Cassandra Nova, who uses this to alienate Jean in the public eye and label her a fugitive. Jean's team is forced to act in secret as she continues in her goal to "heal the world".

An annual was published in May 2018, detailing the events between Phoenix Resurrection and X-Men: Red #1.

=== Volume 2 ===
A second volume of the title written by Al Ewing was published during the "Destiny of X" relaunch of X-Men books and is a successor to Ewing's S.W.O.R.D. series. The series follows the mutants of Arakko, a living island that was relocated to Mars.

== Main characters ==
These characters are credited as main cast in the respective comics.

Series and first credition	Characters
Volume 1
#1	Honey Badger; Marvel Girl; Namor; Nightcrawler; Wolverine
#3	Trinary
#5	Gambit; Gentle; Storm
Volume 2
#1	Abigail Brand; Cable; Magneto; Storm; Sunspot; Thunderbird; Vulcan
#3	Fisher King; Manifold; Tarn the Uncaring
#4	Elixir; Hope Summers; Isca the Unbeaten; Marvel Girl; Ora Serrata; Wrongslide; Xilo
#5	Idyll; Nightcrawler; Lactuca of the Stars; Lodus Logos; Sobunar of the Depths
#6	Khora of the Burning Heart
#8	Weaponless Zsen; Wiz Kid
#10	Orbis Stellaris
#11	Kobak Never-Held; Nova; Professor X
#12	Genesis; Jon Ironfire; White Sword
#13	Lycaon Two Wolves
X-Men: Before the Fall – The Heralds of Apocalypse #1	Apocalypse; Famine; Pestilence; War
#15	Syzya of the Smoke
#16	Death
#17	Sunfire

== Team rosters ==
=== X-Men ===
Character codename	Real name	Notes
Honey Badger	Gabrielle "Gabby" Kinney	Joined in X-Men: Red #1.
Marvel Girl	Jean Elaine Grey	Joined in X-Men: Red #1.
Namor	Namor Mackenzie	Joined in X-Men: Red #1.
Nightcrawler	Kurt Wagner	Joined in X-Men: Red #1.
Wolverine	Laura Kinney	Joined in X-Men: Red #1.
Trinary	Shilpa Khatri	Joined in X-Men: Red #1 (flashback X-Men: Red #2).
Gentle	Nezhno Abidemi	Joined in X-Men: Red #1 (flashback X-Men: Red #4).
Storm	Ororo Munroe	Joined in X-Men: Red #1 (flashback X-Men: Red #4).
Gambit	Remy Etienne LeBeau	Joined in X-Men: Red #5.

=== X-Men Red ===
X-Men Red was formed by Abigail Brand to police Planet Arakko.

Character codename	Real name	Notes
Abigail Brand		Leader. Joined in X-Men: Red (vol. 2) #2.
Cable	Nathan Summers	Field leader. Joined in X-Men: Red (vol. 2) #2.
Frenzy	Joanna Cargill	Joined in X-Men: Red (vol. 2) #2.
Manifold	Eden Fesi	Joined and left in X-Men: Red (vol. 2) #2
Mentallo	Marvin Flumm	Joined in X-Men: Red (vol. 2) #2.
Random	Marshall Stone III	Joined in X-Men: Red (vol. 2) #2.
Vulcan	Gabriel Summers	Joined in X-Men: Red (vol. 2) #2.

=== Brotherhood of Arakko ===
The Brotherhood of Arakko was formed by Storm in opposition to X-Men Red and later fought against Genesis' army during the Genesis War.

Character codename	Real name	Notes
Fisher King		Joined in X-Men: Red (vol. 2) #1. Merged with teammate Xilo in X-Men Red (vol. 2) #14. Died in X-Men: Red (vol. 2) #18.
Magneto	Max Eisenhardt	Joined in X-Men: Red (vol. 2) #1. Died in X-Men: Red (vol. 2) #7.
Storm	Ororo Munroe	Joined in X-Men: Red (vol. 2) #1.
Sunspot	Roberto "Bobby" da Costa	Joined in X-Men: Red (vol. 2) #1.
Khora of the Burning Heart		Joined in X-Men: Red (vol. 2) #5.
Wrongslide		Joined in X-Men: Red (vol. 2) #5.
Lodus Logos		Joined in X-Men: Red (vol. 2) #10.
Sobunar of the Depths		Joined in X-Men: Red (vol. 2) #10. Left in X-Men: Red (vol. 2) #13.
Nova	Richard Rider	Joined in X-Men: Red (vol. 2) #12.
Jon Ironfire		Joined in X-Men: Red (vol. 2) #14.
Kobak Never-Held		Joined in X-Men: Red (vol. 2) #14.
Xilo		Joined and merged with teammate Fisher King in X-Men: Red (vol. 2) #14.
Syzya of the Smoke		Joined in X-Men: Red (vol. 2) #15.

==== Great Ring of Arakko ====
The Great Ring of Arakko is the governing body of Arakko.

== Reception ==
=== Volume 1 ===
Prior to publication, the series generated interest for starring Jean Grey, a character who was killed nearly 15 years earlier in New X-Men #150 (February 2004). According to review aggregator Comic Book Roundup, the debut issue received an average score of 8.2 out of 10 based on 33 critical reviews.

In a review for Newsarama, David Pepose praised the plot of the book for its focus on the coexistence of humans and mutants, which he said was the main premise of the X-Men franchise. IGN reviewer Jesse Schedeen agreed, saying the "franchise has a bad habit of ... losing sight of the mutant metaphor and its allegorical power", but was glad X-Men: Red makes it a primary focus. Although they found Mahmud Asrar's art to be flawed but adequate, both of them liked Tom Taylor's portrayal of Grey and her supporting cast. Pepose specifically liked that Grey was a leader instead of a symbol, love interest, or target.

== Prints ==
=== Volume 1 ===
Issue	Publication date	Writer	Artist	Colorist	Comic Book Roundup rating	Estimated sales to North American retailers (first month)
#1	February 7, 2018	Tom Taylor	Mahmud Asrar	Ive Svorcina	8.1 by 34 professional critics	98,468
#2	March 7, 2018	Tom Taylor	Mahmud Asrar	Ive Svorcina	8.0 by 15 professional critics	49,084
#3	April 11, 2018	Tom Taylor	Mahmud Asrar	Ive Svorcina	8.1 by 10 professional critics	56,531
#4	May 16, 2018	Tom Taylor	Mahmud Asrar	Rain Beredo	8.2 by 13 professional critics	44,607
Annual #1	May 30, 2018	Tom Taylor	Pascal Alixe	Chris Sotomayor	7.5 by 16 professional critics	38,444
#5	June 6, 2018	Tom Taylor	Mahmud Asrar	Rain Beredo	9.1 by 10 professional critics	38,372
#6	July 18, 2018	Tom Taylor	Carmen Carnero	Rain Beredo	9.1 by 10 professional critics	36,808
#7	August 22, 2018	Tom Taylor	Carmen Carnero	Rain Beredo	9.0 by 15 professional critics	39,634
#8	September 26, 2018	Tom Taylor	Carmen Carnero	Rain Beredo	8.6 by 8 professional critics	39,763
#9	October 24, 2018	Tom Taylor	Rogê Antônio	Rain Beredo	8.2 by 9 professional critics	36,673
#10	November 7, 2018	Tom Taylor	Rogê Antônio	Rain Beredo	8.5 by 10 professional critics	31,821
#11	December 12, 2018	Tom Taylor	Rogê Antônio	Rain Beredo	8.8 by 5 professional critics	30,415

=== Volume 2 ===
Issue	Publication date	Writer	Artist	Colorist	Comic Book Roundup rating	Estimated sales to North American retailers (first month)
#1	April 6, 2022	Al Ewing	Stefano Caselli	Federico Blee	8.6 by 17 professional critics	26,735
#2	May 18, 2022	Al Ewing	Stefano Caselli	Federico Blee	8.7 by 13 professional critics	Not yet available
#3	June 15, 2022	Al Ewing	Stefano Caselli	Federico Blee, Fernando Sifuentes	8.9 by 11 professional critics	Not yet available
#4	June 29, 2022	Al Ewing	Juan Cabal, Andrés Genolet, Michael Sta. Maria	Federico Blee	8.6 by 10 professional critics	Not yet available
#5	August 3, 2022	Al Ewing	Stefano Caselli	Federico Blee	8.3 by 9 professional critics	Not yet available
#6	September 14, 2022	Al Ewing	Stefano Caselli	Federico Blee	8.7 by 10 professional critics	Not yet available
#7	October 5, 2022	Al Ewing	Stefano Caselli	Federico Blee, Fer Sifuentes-Sujo	8.6 by 6 professional critics	Not yet available
#8	November 2, 2022	Al Ewing	Madibek Musabekov	Federico Blee	8.0 by 9 professional critics	Not yet available
#9	December 7, 2022	Al Ewing	Stefano Caselli	Federico Blee	8.7 by 7 professional critics	Not yet available
#10	January 4, 2023	Al Ewing	Stefano Caselli, Jacopo Camagni	Federico Blee	8.8 by 8 professional critics	Not yet available
#11	May 10, 2023	Al Ewing	Stefano Caselli, Jacopo Camagni	Federico Blee	9.1 by 7 professional critics	Not yet available
#12	June 14, 2023	Al Ewing	Jacopo Camagni	Federico Blee	6.9 by 4 professional critics	Not yet available
X-Men: Before the Fall – The Heralds of Apocalypse #1	June 28, 2023	Al Ewing	Luca Pizzari, Stefano Landini, Raphael Pimento	Ceci De La Cruz	7.8 by 10 professional critics	Not yet available
#13	July 19, 2023	Al Ewing	Jacopo Camagni	Federico Blee	8.1 by 5 professional critics	Not yet available
#14	August 16, 2023	Al Ewing	Yıldıray Çınar	Federico Blee	8.4 by 6 professional critics	Not yet available
#15	September 13, 2023	Al Ewing	Yıldıray Çınar	Federico Blee	8.2 by 6 professional critics	Not yet available
#16	October 11, 2023	Al Ewing	Yıldıray Çınar	Federico Blee	9.0 by 4 professional critics	Not yet available
#17	November 8, 2023	Al Ewing	Yıldıray Çınar	Federico Blee	8.0 by 5 professional critics	Not yet available
#18	December 13, 2023	Al Ewing	Yıldıray Çınar	Federico Blee	8.6 by 6 professional critics	Not yet available

== Collected editions ==
=== Volume 1 ===
#	Title	Material collected	Pages	Publication date	ISBN
1	The Hate Machine	X-Men: Red #1–5, Annual #1	144	September 18, 2018	978-1302911676
2	Waging Peace	X-Men: Red #6–11	136	March 19, 2019	978-1302911683

=== Volume 2 ===
#	Material collected	Pages	Publication date	ISBN
X-Men: Red by Al Ewing – Volume 1	X-Men: Red (vol. 2) #1–5	152	November 2, 2022	978-1302932831
X-Men: Red by Al Ewing – Volume 2	X-Men: Red (vol. 2) #6–10	136	March 7, 2023	978-1302947521
X-Men: Red by Al Ewing – Volume 3	X-Men: Red (vol. 2) #11–13, X-Men: Before the Fall – The Heralds of Apocalypse #1	120	November 17, 2023	978-1302952280
X-Men: Red by Al Ewing – Volume 4	X-Men: Red (vol. 2) #14–18	136	March 12, 2024	978-1302953430
