= Alliance of Evil =

Fictional group of supervillains

The Alliance of Evil
- The Alliance of Evil featured (right) on the cover of X-Factor #5 (June 1986).

Publication information
- Publisher: Marvel Comics
- First appearance: X-Factor #5 (June 1986)
- Created by: Bob Layton; Jackson Guice

In-story information
- Member(s): Frenzy; Tower; Stinger; Timeshadow

The Alliance of Evil is a group of supervillains appearing in American comic books published by Marvel Comics.

== Publication history ==
The Alliance of Evil first appeared in X-Factor #5–6 (June–July 1986), and was created by writer Bob Layton and artist Jackson Guice. Two of its members, Tower and Frenzy, had appeared before the rest of the team. The team subsequently appears in X-Factor #33 (October 1988), and New Mutants Annual #7 (1991).

The Alliance of Evil received an entry in the Official Handbook of the Marvel Universe Update '89 #1.

== Fictional team biography ==
The Alliance of Evil is initially Apocalypse's personal strike force. Their first mission is to find and capture Michael Nowlan, a mutant with the ability to heighten other mutants' powers. When Nowlan attempts to leave, they kidnaps his girlfriend, Suzy, to use as bait. X-Factor finds Nowlan and vows to protect him. When the Alliance confront Nowlan, they threaten to harm Suzy, coercing Nowlan into empowering them. The Alliance battle X-Factor, then bring Nowlan to Apocalypse. X-Factor eventually finds their hideout, and on Apocalypse's orders, Nowlan powers up the Alliance again. When Suzy tries to escape, Stinger accidentally kills her with her electricity. Nowlan kills himself and Apocalypse abandons the Alliance of Evil.

The group, minus Timeshadow, later encountered the New Mutants, along with Harness and Piecemeal. They were defeated, and when questioned later, Frenzy admitted to being hired by AIM to bodyguard Harness and Piecemeal. She was then dropped out of a helicopter. The group eventually disbanded. Frenzy went on to join the ranks of Magneto's Acolytes and later the X-Men themselves, Tower was killed by the X-Cutioner, and Stinger was seen befriending Iceman on the X-Men's home island of Utopia. Timeshadow has not been seen since.

== Members ==
=== Employers ===
- Apocalypse (En Sabah Nur)
- Piecemeal (Gilbert Benson): The son of Harness

=== Agents ===
- Frenzy (Joanna Cargill): Frenzy is the field leader of the Alliance and possesses superhuman strength and durability. She later joins Magneto and his Acolytes, and eventually through mind-control joined the X-Men. She had returned to the Acolytes after Exodus reformed the group, having retained her mutant powers; she resides on Utopia.
- Tower (Edward Pasternak): A mutant with the ability to increase his size and strength. He is probably the most reckless out of the group, and is not very bright. Tower was killed by the mutant-hunting X-Cutioner, but was later resurrected by Selene.
- Stinger (Wendy Sherman): A young valley girl who can manipulate electricity.
- Timeshadow: He possesses the mutant power to phase into time, allowing himself to teleport in a way, or appear to be in several places at once. His current status and whereabouts are unknown.
- Source (Michael Nowlan): A mutant who can generate pulses of energy that increase a superhuman's abilities, sometimes beyond their control. Nowlan was captured and forced to join the Alliance of Evil. Deceased.
