= X-Corps =

Fictional comic book group

- Cover to The Uncanny X-Men #403

Publication information
- Publisher: Marvel Comics
- First appearance: The Uncanny X-Men #401 (Jan. 2002)
- Created by: Joe Casey; Ron Garney

In-story information
- Base(s): X-Corps headquarters near Paris, France
- Member(s): Members

The X-Corps is a fictional team appearing in American comic books published by Marvel Comics. Whether they were good or bad was left up to debate, even within the X-Men, but the team acted as a mutant police force created by former X-Man Banshee, in The Uncanny X-Men #401 (Jan. 2002). The team concept was created by Joe Casey and Ron Garney.

== History ==
=== Background ===
After the death of Moira MacTaggert and the closing of Massachusetts Academy, Banshee began to reconsider Charles Xavier's dream of peaceful coexistence between humans and mutants. Banshee re-envisioned Xavier's dream in a new way: using mutants as a police force to regulate the activity of other mutants instead of waiting for a crisis to arise, With an abandoned A.I.M. facility, his links to Interpol, and the help of some of his former friends and pupils, Banshee creates the X-Corps to police the mutant population in Europe.

Along with Multiple Man, his former students Husk, Jubilee, and M, former Alpha Flight member Radius, and one-time interim X-Men member Sunpyre, he formed the basis of his group. However, the distinct element that separated this group from other X-Men teams, was the inclusion of known terrorists, such as Avalanche, Blob, and Fever Pitch. Originally, Banshee kept these supervillains in line with the help of Mastermind. Also as a "guest" was Abyss, who was being studied by Sunpyre.

=== Exploits ===
The X-Corps did not operate as a long term group. The team recruits Mystique, who was posing as a potential new member named Surge. Because of her shapeshifting abilities, Mystique is able to move secretly around the headquarters, allying with Mastermind. Together, they free the minds of the villainous X-Corps members, as well as control several duplicates of Multiple Man, and use them in an assault on Paris. In the name of mutant superiority, the group incurs massive damage to the city including the destruction of the Eiffel Tower. Thankfully, the X-Men, along with the heroic members of the X-Corps, are able to put an end to their rampage across the city.

=== Aftermath ===
Unfortunately, there are several casualties of the battles. Avalanche opens up the ground beneath Radius, seemingly killing him, though it is later revealed that his force field saved him. Sunpyre, acting as the group scientist, is murdered by Mystique during her ascent to power. Even Banshee is incapacitated as Mystique stabs a knife through his throat, the source of his sonic powers. Finally, Mystique is sucked into the interdimensional void of Abyss, not to be seen for several months.

With the injuries sustained by Banshee and the damage to the city of Paris, the group is shut down, while some of their remaining resources and members—such as Multiple Man and M—were moved to the Paris branch of X-Corporation.

=== Krakoan Team ===
The team is revamped by Sunspot, who recruits Layla Miller, Multiple Man, Trinary, and Wiz Kid. After Orchis attacks Krakoa during the third Hellfire Gala, the team is repurposed to oppose Orchis under the leadership of Danielle Moonstar. This version of the team uses a floating island as their base.

== Members ==
Character	Name	Joined in	Notes
Banshee	Sean Cassidy	Uncanny X-Men (Vol. 1) #401 (December 2001)	Leader and founder. Left team in Uncanny X-Men #406
Blob	Fred Dukes	Uncanny X-Men (Vol. 1) #401 (December 2001)	Brainwashed, left team in Uncanny X-Men #405
Multiple Man	Jamie Madrox	Uncanny X-Men (Vol. 1) #401 (December 2001)	Used dupes as support staff, went on to work for X-Corporation
Avalanche	Dominikos Petrakis	Uncanny X-Men (Vol. 1) #401 (December 2001)	Brainwashed, left team in Uncanny X-Men #405
Radius	Jared Corbo	Uncanny X-Men (Vol. 1) #401 (December 2001)	Apparently killed by Avalanche, later revealed to have survived
Sunpyre	Leyu Yoshida	Uncanny X-Men (Vol. 1) #402 (February 2002)	Resident scientist. Killed by Mystique in Uncanny X-Men #404
Surge (Mystique)	Raven Darkhölme	Uncanny X-Men (Vol. 1) #402 (February 2002)	Posed as 'Surge' to infiltrate team. Sucked into the void of Abyss
Mastermind	Martinique Jason	Uncanny X-Men (Vol. 1) #402 (February 2002)	Drugged and held captive by team, freed by Mystique in Uncanny X-Men #405
Abyss	Nils Styger	Uncanny X-Men (Vol. 1) #402 (February 2002)	Held for observation by team
Husk	Paige Guthrie	Uncanny X-Men (Vol. 1) #403 (February 2002)	Left team in Uncanny X-Men #406
Jubilee	Jubilation Lee	Uncanny X-Men (Vol. 1) #403 (February 2002)	Left team in Uncanny X-Men #406
M	Monet St. Croix	Uncanny X-Men (Vol. 1) #403 (February 2002)	Left team in Uncanny X-Men #406
Fever Pitch		Uncanny X-Men (Vol. 1) #403 (February 2002)	Brainwashed. Left team in Uncanny X-Men #405

=== Krakoan Team ===
Character	Name	Joined in	Notes
Mirage	Danielle 'Dani' Moonstar	X-Men Unlimited Infinity Comic (Vol. 1) #122 (January 2024)	Field leader
Thunderbird	John Proudstar	X-Men Unlimited Infinity Comic (Vol. 1) #122 (January 2024)	Used his home, Camp Gozhoo, as a haven for mutants with X-Corps assistance
Shatterstar	Gaveedra Seven	X-Men Unlimited Infinity Comic (Vol. 1) #123(January 2024)	Recruited by Mirage
Sunspot	Roberto 'Bobby' Da Costa	X-Men Unlimited Infinity Comic (Vol. 1) #124 (January 2024)	Founder
Multiple Man	Jamie Madrox	X-Men Unlimited Infinity Comic (Vol. 1) #124 (January 2024)	Joining team depicted in X-Men Unlimited Infinity Comic (Vol. 1) #129
Layla Miller		X-Men Unlimited Infinity Comic (Vol. 1) #124 (January 2024)	Joining team depicted in X-Men Unlimited Infinity Comic (Vol. 1) #129
Trinary	Shilpa Khatri	X-Men Unlimited Infinity Comic (Vol. 1) #124 (January 2024)	Joining team depicted in X-Men Unlimited Infinity Comic (Vol. 1) #129. Helps operate the floating island base
Wiz Kid	Takeshi 'Taki' Matsuya	X-Men Unlimited Infinity Comic (Vol. 1) #124 (January 2024)	Joining team depicted in X-Men Unlimited Infinity Comic (Vol. 1) #129. Helps operate the floating island base
Rictor	Julio Richter	X-Men Unlimited Infinity Comic (Vol. 1) #125 (February 2024)	Recruited by Mirage
Captain Britain	Elizabeth 'Betsy' Braddock	X-Men Unlimited Infinity Comic (Vol. 1) #126 (February 2024)	Joined to face Selene Gallio
Strong Guy	Guido Carosella	X-Men Unlimited Infinity Comic (Vol. 1) #129 (March 2024)	Never took part in any on-panel missions
Khora of the Burning Heart		X-Men Unlimited Infinity Comic (Vol. 1) #139 (May 2024)	Danielle Moonstar's Nova Roma strike team
Escapade	Shela Sexton	X-Men Unlimited Infinity Comic (Vol. 1) #139 (May 2024)	Danielle Moonstar's Nova Roma strike team
Velocidad	Gabriel Cohuelo	X-Men Unlimited Infinity Comic (Vol. 1) #139 (May 2024)	Danielle Moonstar's Nova Roma strike team
Magma	Amara Aquilla	X-Men Unlimited Infinity Comic (Vol. 1) #139 (May 2024)	Danielle Moonstar's Nova Roma strike team
Cipher	Alisa Tager	X-Men Unlimited Infinity Comic (Vol. 1) #141 (May 2024)	Cloaked the island base when above Nova Roma
El Águila	Alejandro Montoya	X-Men Unlimited Infinity Comic (Vol. 1) #142 (June 2024)	Rescued from Nova Roma

Supporting characters

- Cerebra
- Horsepower
- Somnus
- Tempo
- Warpath
- X-Men

== Bibliography ==
- The Uncanny X-Men #401-406 (Jan. 2002-June 2002)
