= Maggott =

- Maggott as depicted in Generation X #48 (December 1998). Art by Terry Dodson.

Publication information
- Publisher: Marvel Comics
- First appearance: Uncanny X-Men #345 (1997)
- Created by: Scott Lobdell (writer); Joe Madureira (artist)

In-story information
- Alter ego: Japheth
- Species: Human mutant
- Team affiliations: X-Men; Generation X Dark X-Men
- Abilities: Slug-based digestive system; Psychometry

Maggott (Japheth) is a fictional superhero appearing in American comic books published by Marvel Comics. The character was briefly a member of the X-Men.

A flamboyant Zulu mutant who uses exaggerated Afrikaans slang, Maggott is advertised as one of the strangest X-Men. His digestive system takes the form of two slugs which can eat through practically any substance. After feeding, the slugs reenter Maggott's abdomen and pass nourishment into him, giving him incredible power.

== Publication history ==
Maggott was created by writer Scott Lobdell and artist Joe Madureira, and first appeared in The Uncanny X-Men #345 (June 1997).

== Fictional character biography ==
Japheth was born a sickly child in Apartheid-era South Africa. He was chronically ill and could not digest solid food. Feeling himself to be a burden on his family, Japheth ran away from home with his younger brother. Having left home, hoping to die, Japheth was found by Magneto, who uncovered the mutant slugs living in his digestive system. Compassionate at heart, Japheth rejected Magneto's philosophy and his offer to join him after witnessing him massacre white soldiers who were engaged in racist atrocities against black South African civilians.

Maggott is first seen as a mysterious mutant who is searching out the X-Men's adversary Magneto for an unknown reason. His search leads him to Antarctica, where Magneto is holding the X-Men captive. Maggott joins the X-Men and returns with them to their Westchester, New York headquarters. Beast suggests Maggott transfer to the junior team Generation X, but his tenure there lasts only one issue.

Maggott later appears as an inmate at Neverland, a concentration camp run by Weapon X, where he is executed. In the "Necrosha" event, Maggott is resurrected via the Transmode Virus to serve as part of Selene's army. Under the control of Selene, he takes part in the assault on the mutant nation of Utopia. Maggott remains alive after Selene and Bard are defeated.

During the "X-Manhunt" storyline, Maggott is among the X-Men members who attempt to apprehend Charles Xavier after he escapes prison, but he is wounded by Juggernaut, who rips off his right arm. Storm infuses Maggott with the power of Eegun, which restores his arm and empowers him.

== Powers and abilities ==
Maggott's digestive system consists of a hollow cavity that houses two slugs called Eany and Meany. They share a telepathic link with him and can temporarily emerge from his body to digest solid matter, giving him superhuman strength and durability. Maggott possesses a form of psychometry that enables him to view the recent past and future by reading psychic imprints from the environment.

== Reception ==
In 2014, Darren Franich of Entertainment Weekly ranked Maggott 100th in his "Let's rank every X-Man ever" list, coming in last place. Franich criticized Maggott's "absolutely ridiculous" powers, stating that they "wouldn't be useful ever for anyone".

Maggott is often viewed negatively due to his unusual powers. However, Steve Morris of Comics Beat defended Maggott, seeing potential in him as a character. Morris saw a trend in which Maggott and other mutants with inhuman appearances were killed off or made less monstrous, becoming the minority within mutants.

== In other media ==
- Maggott makes non-speaking cameo appearances in X-Men '97.
- Maggott received a figure in the Marvel Legends line.
