= Joanna Cargill =

Marvel Comics character

- Frenzy/ Art by Humberto Ramos.

Publication information
- Publisher: Marvel Comics
- First appearance: X-Factor #4 (May 1986)
- Created by: Bob Layton (writer); Keith Pollard (artist)

In-story information
- Alter ego: Joanna Cargill
- Species: Human mutant
- Team affiliations: Acolytes; Genoshan Assault X-Men; Alliance of Evil; Femizons; X-Men; Jean Grey School; X-Factor
- Notable aliases: Frenzy
- Abilities: Superhuman strength and durability

Joanna Cargill, also known as Frenzy, is a fictional character, a mutant superhuman appearing in American comic books published by Marvel Comics. Frenzy first appeared in X-Factor #4 (May 1986) and was created by Bob Layton and Keith Pollard. Frenzy is a mutant with the ability of superhuman strength and durability.

Frenzy was initially a member of supervillain groups, including the Alliance of Evil and the Acolytes, later becoming a superhero, joining the X-Men and X-Factor.

== Publication history ==
Frenzy first appeared in X-Factor #4 (May 1986) as a member of the Alliance of Evil, and was created by Bob Layton and Keith Pollard.

Though Joanna Cargill's first and last name have been spelled with variations such as Johanna or Cargil, her name was first mentioned in The Uncanny X-Men #298 as Joanna Cargill. Frenzy should not be confused with another Joanna Cargill, a columnist introduced in Marvel Comics Presents #27.

During a March 2, 2011 Marvel Comics Liveblog, it was revealed that Frenzy was joining X-Men: Legacy in 2011 as a member of Rogue's team of X-Men, alongside Professor X, Magneto, Legion, and Gambit.

Frenzy was a featured character in the 2024 4-issue limited series Dead X-Men.

In the From the Ashes reboot, Frenzy appeared as a member of the new X-Factor in X-Factor (Vol. 5).

== Fictional character biography ==
=== Early life ===
Joanna Cargill was born prematurely, and was a sickly, frail child. Her home was abusive, with her military father favoring his son, and her mother not intervening on the abuse. After Joanna's brother was killed in action, Joanna's father attacked her in his rage. When defending herself, Joanna's mutation activated and she killed her father accidentally.

=== Alliance of Evil ===
Originally a freelance mercenary, Frenzy joins with three other mutants — Tower, Stinger, and Timeshadow — under the employ of Apocalypse, calling themselves the Alliance of Evil. The Alliance of Evil would have a number of conflicts with X-Factor, eventually ending up in custody. The group escape and oppose the Mutant Registration Act, but are defeated by Beast.

Frenzy briefly joins Superia's Femizons against Captain America and Paladin. Under unknown circumstances, she was once again imprisoned, but was able to break free from the Vault and created problems for the Avengers.

=== Acolytes ===
Frenzy eventually found acceptance under Magneto's teachings, joining the ranks of the second incarnation of the Acolytes as Cargill. Their first mission was to capture a child with latent mutant powers from a school. During the mission, Cargill killed Sharon Friedlander. Later, Cargill attempted to murder Senator Robert Kelly, but was defeated by Wolfsbane.

After Magneto was revealed to be alive, Cargill was among the Acolytes who quickly turned on Fabian Cortez and joined Magneto in his mutant sanctuary, Avalon. During the Fall of Avalon, Cargill allied with long-time enemy Cyclops in order to survive, and she and her fellow Acolytes were able to escape the destroyed space station in time. They crash landed in Australia but were given to the authorities.

The Acolytes escaped prison and found the remains of Avalon, worshiping it and the return of Magneto. Exodus eventually took over leadership of the Acolytes.

=== Mind-controlled ===
After the Acolytes disbanded, Cargill became the ambassador of Genosha to the United Nations and served as Magneto's right-hand woman. After issuing threats to other nations on television, Cargill was captured by the government. Jean Grey freed Cargill and mind-controlled her to help a new team of X-Men defeat Magneto. After she was freed from her mind-control, she left the X-Mansion.

=== After M-Day ===
Frenzy is one of the few mutants left after M-Day. She resurfaces as part of a new team of Acolytes under Exodus. The team allied themselves with Mister Sinister in attacking the X-Mansion in search of Destiny's diaries, but failed.

During Messiah Complex, Frenzy joined in the battle against the X-Teams, most often battling Colossus. In X-Men: Divided We Stand, the Acolytes steal Professor X's body, but are defeated and Frenzy was put into a coma by Magneto. Xavier later woke her, but the Acolytes soon disbanded.

=== Joining the X-Men ===
Frenzy later joins other mutants to the island of Utopia. Alongside other mutants, she battles the Dark Avengers and Nimrods.

Following the end of Age of X, an alternate timeline in which she was married to Cyclops, Joanna had trouble adjusting back to normal life, as her experiences as a hero had a profound effect on her. She confronted Cyclops about the time they shared together in the other timeline, but he rejected her. Frenzy then starts dressing as her Age of X counterpart and decides that she wants to become an X-Man.

She joins Rogue's X-Men team, assisting in tracking down Legion's escaped personalities and rescuing Havok, Polaris and Marvel Girl from space.

=== Jean Grey School For Higher Learning ===
Following the X-Men's Schism, Frenzy leaves Utopia alongside Wolverine and other former X-Men to re-open the Jean Grey School For Higher Learning. Before departing Utopia, she assists Rogue and a few other X-Men in saving Ariel. Following the release of the Terrigen Mist clouds on Earth and their threat to mutants, Frenzy chose to ally herself with Crystal and her team of Inhumans.

=== Dawn and Fall of X ===
In House of X and Powers of X, Frenzy joins the mutant nation of Krakoa. She later joins the newly reinstated S.W.O.R.D. satellite (post X of Swords) as Intergalactic Ambassador.

Frenzy was included in the third annual vote to join the X-Men. In a twist, all options were added into a new incarnation of the X-Men, only to be killed by Nimrod at the Hellfire Gala. The team are resurrected and guided in a hunt for a version of Moira X in the Moira Engine.

== Powers and abilities ==
Frenzy is a mutant who possesses steel-hard skin that makes her resistant to most forms of conventional physical injury, as well as temperature extremes. She has been shown to merely shrug off being covered in flames and is also highly resistant to microwave radiation, though adamantium has been shown to puncture her skin after an encounter with X-23. Frenzy also possesses superhuman strength, approximately on par with Spider-Man. In later appearances, she has been depicted as strong enough to battle characters like Rogue, and She-Hulk.

== Other versions ==
Joanna Cargill has a number of alternate reality versions in Marvel Comics. She marries Cyclops in "Age of X", survives the zombie outbreak with her fellow Acolytes in Marvel Zombies, joins Gene Nation in Days of Future Now, and is a member of the X-Men in X-Men: The End.

== In other media ==
- Joanna Cargill makes a non-speaking appearance in the X-Men: The Animated Series two-part episode "Sanctuary" as a member of Magneto's Acolytes. Additionally, an alternate timeline incarnation of Cargill appears in the episode "One Man's Worth" [Pt. 1] as a member of a mutant resistance movement.
  - Joanna Cargill reappears as a member of the Acolytes in the X-Men '97 season 2 episode, "Strange Land, Savage Heart".
- Joanna Cargill appears in the X-Men: Mutant Empire novel trilogy as a member of Magneto's Acolytes.

== Reception ==
- Screen Rant ranked Frenzy 9th in "11 X-Men Heroes Who Out-Wolverine Wolverine as the Franchise's Biggest Badasses", 9th in "10 Strongest X-Men Heroes of All Time (Ranked by Physical Strength)", and 6th in "X-Men: Ranking All of Cyclops' Love Interests by Chemistry".
- Comic Book Resources ranked Frenzy 10th in "10 X-Men That Are Surprisingly More Powerful Than Black Widow", 5th in "The 10 Most Powerful X-Men No One Talks About, Ranked" and included her in "10 X-Men Missing From Marvel Snap".
- Collider included Frenzy in "10 X-Men Villains We Want to See in the Animated Series Reboot".
- Paste Magazine included Frenzy in "The 15 Most Underrated, Underused X-Men Characters".
