= Husk (comics) =

Marvel Comics superhero

- Cover art for Uncanny X-Men #432. Art by Phillip Tan.

Publication information
- Publisher: Marvel Comics
- First appearance: Rom Annual #3 (Nov. 1984)
- Created by: Bill Mantlo (writer); William Johnson (artist), re-established by Fabian Nicieza; Tony Daniel

In-story information
- Alter ego: Paige Elisabeth Guthrie
- Species: Human mutant
- Team affiliations: X-Men; Generation X; X-Corps; Mutantes Sans Frontières; Xavier Institute; S.H.I.E.L.D; Jean Grey School
- Abilities: Shedding: the ability to shed skin into a different composition, shape, or size beneath Experienced in martial arts

Husk (Paige Guthrie) is a superhero appearing in American comic books published by Marvel Comics. First appearing in Rom Annual #3 (Nov. 1984) as the younger sister of X-Men member Cannonball, she was created by Bill Mantlo and William Johnson.

Paige was later re-established by Fabian Nicieza and Tony Daniel as a mutant hero known as Husk, with the ability to remove one layer of skin—or "husk"—revealing an epidermis of a different composition beneath. She often changes into metal or stone form, but can shift into a variety of substances.

Husk is from a Kentucky coal mining family and, unlike her brother, she is self-conscious of being seen as a "hick". She was initially a member of the X-Men's 1990s-era junior team Generation X, and later joined the X-Men.

== Publication history ==
Husk first made appearances as a background character as one of Cannonball's many siblings in Rom Annual #3 (1984) by Bill Mantlo and William Johnson and The New Mutants #42 (1986) by Chris Claremont and Jackson Guice. She was revealed as a mutant and her personality was developed by Fabian Nicieza and Tony Daniel in X-Force #32 (1994) as part of that title's Child's Play crossover with New Warriors, which segued into her participation in the Generation Next arc of the Phalanx Covenant, running through X-Men #36-37 (1994) and Uncanny X-Men #317 (1994).

Husk would then become a permanent member of Generation X (1994–2001), originally created by Scott Lobdell and Chris Bachalo. This run defined and expanded her personality and mutant abilities. After Generation X disbanded, Husk served as a member of the X-Men in Uncanny X-Men #414-443 (2002–2004), thereafter appearing sporadically as a reserve member and background character in various X-titles, highlighted by a mission during the Necrosha event in X-Men: Legacy #231-233 (2010).

During the X-Men's Schism, Husk joined Cannonball and threw in with Wolverine's side in X-Men: Regenesis #1, becoming a faculty member at the Jean Grey School in Westchester. Husk appears regularly as a supporting character in Wolverine and the X-Men (2012) from issue #2 onward.

Husk appears in many X-Men titles during the Krakoan Age, notably in Astonishing X-Men Infinity Comics #1-6; 13–42.

== Fictional character biography ==
The sister of the X-Man Cannonball, Paige Guthrie was born to a large Kentucky coal miner's family. Her father died when she was very young, due to a lung affliction from working in the mines. As a teenager, she discovers her inborn mutant ability to shed her skin, metamorphosing into a different composition beneath. She has used this power to turn her body into stone, glass, and an acid-like substance, among other materials. She can also use her power to heal herself by shedding a damaged form in favor of an intact one. She normally cannot change the shape of her form, only its composition, although an issue of X-Force, written before her powers had been fully defined, depicted her transforming into a bird.

=== Generation X ===
From the series' beginning in 1994 until its cancellation at issue #75 in 2001, Husk was a member of the junior X-Men team Generation X, where she earned a reputation as a workaholic, constantly trying to prove herself fit for the main team. She also develops a troubled relationship with her antisocial teammate Chamber. Towards the end of the team's existence she became the group's computer expert and developed an interest in environmental issues.

After the breakup of Generation X, Husk joins Banshee's militant X-Corps, along with other Gen X members, to keep an eye on him. This does not end well, with Banshee's more criminal charges staging a coup and the Gen X members having to take down the Blob.

=== X-Men ===
Husk joins the X-Men in Chuck Austen's 2001 revamp of Uncanny X-Men. She enters a relationship with the long-time X-Man Archangel, which proved controversial as Husk was 19 years old and several years Archangel's junior.

Archangel and Husk take an extended leave of absence from the X-Men. Archangel launches a charity called "Mutantes Sans Frontières" in Zanzibar, a reference to Médecins Sans Frontières (Doctors Without Borders). The two proceed to help stop a coup with the aid of Professor X's newest charges from nearby Genosha.

Husk's younger brother Jay later joins the new New Mutants team under the codename Icarus. Her sister Melody also joined the school as Aero after discovering she could fly. Melody has since been depowered after M-Day, although Paige retains her powers. Icarus was later killed following the events of M-Day, in a confrontation with the anti-mutant activist William Stryker and his army. The resulting battles also take the lives of dozens of other students.

=== Divided We Stand ===
The first issue of Divided We Stand revealed that Paige had returned to living with her family. She is the one who picks up her brother, Cannonball, at the airport to bring him home. However, Sam, still feeling angry over the betrayal of his X-Men team, tells her to take him to a local bar, where he picks a fight with the members of rival families from their home. Paige confronts Sam on his action after the brawl ends. Sam yells that he has lost faith in how the life of an X-Men works and flies off, leaving Paige fearful for his life and mind.

=== Secret Invasion ===
Husk is seen fighting alongside the rest of the X-Men in San Francisco and flirting with Angel at the same time, though it would appear they are no longer a couple.

=== Nation X/Necrosha ===
Paige is a resident of the mutant nation of Utopia and is seen fighting alongside the New X-Men battling her reanimated former teammates Synch and Skin. Paige is subsequently sent to Muir Island with a team of X-Men led by Nightcrawler to further investigate the attacks on Utopia. When the team reaches Muir Island, they discover that Proteus has returned. Proteus takes swift action, dispatching Colossus and Magneto and possessing Trance, Nightcrawler, Psylocke, and Husk.

=== Schism ===
Following the conflict between Wolverine and Cyclops that leads to the former abandoning Utopia, Husk becomes a teacher at the Jean Grey School for Higher Learning.

=== Leaving the X-Men ===
Husk is later revealed to have joined the Hellfire Club's Hellfire Academy as an agent. When Toad helps Quentin Quire to escape the Hellfire Academy, Husk and the other students try to stop them. Husk attacks Toad, who rips off her skin until her normal self resurfaces. She has only vague memories of what happened, and does not remember her relationship with Toad. The X-Men shut down the Hellfire Academy.

Husk's personality shifts and subsequent mental breakdown were caused by a secondary mutation that caused her powers to affect her mind as well as her body. Husk is forgiven for her betrayal since she was of unsound mind and is made the academy's new guidance counselor. However, Toad is fired. As he is leaving, Husk apologizes to him for being unable to remember what happened between them, he claims he knew it was too good to last. Before he leaves she arranges a date at a local coffee shop, but the city is attacked by self-replicating energy bots built by Maximilian Frankenstein so he and Manuel Endque could escape the Grey Academy. The X-Men defeat the robots, and half the coffee shop is destroyed. Endque was found by the X-Men having been severely beaten by Toad on Frankenstein's orders, Toad seemingly now working for Frankenstein after wanting to go someplace nobody can hurt them. Endque passes on a message to Husk that Toad left because he knew even if things went well between them one day she would wake up and see him for what he really was. Husk breaks down in tears.

== Powers and abilities ==
Husk possesses the mutant ability to change her physical form by shedding her skin to reveal a new layer or shape underneath. These forms take on new physical abilities or qualities appropriate to the form, such as increased weight, strength, or invulnerability. Paige has shown some ability to take on forms with energy powers - including a fiery form that generates heat and flame, and a form with acidic skin.

Husk is unable to transform into anything that exceeds her base mass. However, she is able to transform into smaller forms by transferring excess mass into another dimension.

Husk has also been shown to be able to use her ability to effectively shapeshift and impersonate another person, instead of looking like a version of herself made out of another substance.

== Reception ==
- In 2014, Entertainment Weekly ranked Husk 15th in their "Let's rank every X-Man ever" list.
- CBR.com ranked Husk 9th in their "20 Most Powerful Mutants From The '80s", 6th in "10 Forgotten X-Men Characters Who Desperately Need to Make a Comeback", 13th in "15 Minor X-Men Characters Who Deserved Better", 14th in "15 X-Men With Powers That Make No Sense", 11th in "12 Marvel Heroes Who Never Had a Solo Series - But Should", and included her in "Marvel's Weirdest X-Men Superpowers Are Way Too Gross for the MCU".
- Screen Rant ranked Husk 9th in "12 Most Underrated X-Men Heroes Forgotten by Marvel Fans".
- Comicbook.com ranked Husk 5th in The X-Men's 6 Most Horrific Mutant Powers" and 5th in "7 X-Men Powers Way Too Dark For The MCU".
- Husk's relationship with Warren Worthington III has been a source of controversy surrounding the character.

== Other versions ==
=== Age of Apocalypse ===
Paige's AoA look

An alternate universe version of Paige Guthrie / Husk appears in the "Age of Apocalypse" storyline. She joins Generation Next after the death of most her family. After being overrun deep in hostile territory, Paige and Generation Next are presumed dead. Paige survives, but is captured and enslaved. She is later convinced by Mister Sinister to seek revenge against the X-Men. Husk infiltrates the X-Men, only to be killed by Kirika.

=== Others ===
Alternate universe versions of Paige Guthrie / Husk appear in Age of X, Age of X-Man, Mutant X, X-Men '92, and the Ultimate Marvel universe.

- Dial H.U.S.K was an amalgamation of Husk and Dial H for Hero created by Amalgam Comics.

== In other media ==
- A young Paige Guthrie appears in the X-Men: The Animated Series episode "Hidden Agendas", voiced by Tara Strong.
- Husk received a Hasbro Marvel Legends figure in the 2025 Nemesis BAF wave.
