= M (Marvel Comics) =

Comic book superheroine

- M as depicted in Generation X #48 (February 1999). Art by Terry Dodson.

Publication information
- Publisher: Marvel Comics
- First appearance: The Uncanny X-Men #316 (Sept. 1994)
- Created by: Scott Lobdell; Chris Bachalo

In-story information
- Alter ego: Monet Yvette Clarisse Maria Therese St. Croix
- Species: Human mutant
- Team affiliations: Generation X X-Corporation: Paris; X-Corps; X-Factor Investigations; X-Men; Hellfire Club; Weapon X-Force; Avengers Unity Division
- Notable aliases: M-Plate, Penance, White Queen, Monet St. Croix
- Abilities: Superhuman strength, speed, agility, dexterity, reflexes, coordination, balance, vision, hearing, and endurance Genius level intellect Intuitive aptitude Accelerated healing factor Supersonic Flight; Telekinesis; Telepathy; Ability to perceive mutant auras

M, or Penance (Monet Yvette Clarisse Maria Therese St. Croix), is a superheroine appearing in American comic books published by Marvel Comics. First appearing in The Uncanny X-Men #316 (September 1994), the character was created by Scott Lobdell and Chris Bachalo. Monet St. Croix is a mutant with a variety of superhuman abilities, including enchanced physical and mental capabilities, flight, and telepathy.

The character is primarily depicted in association with the X-Men, also having joined superhero teams such as Generation X and X-Factor Investigations. The character and her siblings have a complicated history in the comics, with her brother Emplate transforming her into the mute Penance and her sisters taking her place, before being freed.

== Publication history ==
Monet St. Croix (Nicole and Claudette merged) first appeared in X-Men #316 (September 1994), created by Scott Lobdell and Chris Bachalo. Monet in the form of Penance first appeared in Generation X #1 (September, 1994).

The twins merged into Penance in issue #40, and all three girls were freed from Penance in issue #57. The form left behind, now known as Hollow, also operated normally after this.

Monet appeared as a member of X-Corps in Uncanny X-Men #403-406, and in #410-412. Monet joined the cast of X-Factor (vol. 3), beginning with issue #2. She joined an all-female X-Men team in X-Men (vol. 4) #7, which one survey of Muslim representation in comics credited with helping open the door for further women-of-color-led titles. The series ended with issue #26, from which Monet joined Uncanny X-Men (vol. 4). She appeared in Generation X (vol. 2) and Weapon X (vol. 3).

During the Krakoan Age, Monet appeared in a number of different titles, notably X-Corp (vol. 1), Uncanny X-Men (vol. 4), and X-Men Unlimited Infinity Comic #50-54 as a candidate for the X-Men vote. She was also part of the Heir of Apocalypse storyline after the Fall of X.

== Fictional character biography ==
=== Early life ===
Monet St. Croix was born in Sarajevo, Bosnia, and is the second child of Afro-Monégasque ambassador Cartier St. Croix and his Algerian wife. Monet was raised Muslim and grew up pompous and spoiled as a result of being the favored child of her father. Monet's brother Marius, also known as Emplate, is banished from the St. Croix home shortly after his mother's death, but returns after learning dark magic and requests that Monet join him in conquering another dimension. Monet rejects Marius' offer, leading him to transform her into a creature dubbed Penance. Monet's younger twin sisters, Nicole and Claudette, banish Emplate to another dimension. Monet follows Emplate in an attempt to return herself to normal, but is enslaved, becoming a regular source of bone marrow for Emplate.

Afraid their father would break down after the loss of his favorite child, Nicole and Claudette decide to impersonate her in their fused form. This version of Monet would have been identical to the original, but shares Claudette's autism, occasionally leaving her in catatonic stupors. While the twins are impersonating their sister, they are among the mutants captured by the alien Phalanx.

=== Generation X ===
After being rescued from the Phalanx by Banshee and Emma Frost, the mutants form the team Generation X, with Banshee and Frost training them. Shortly after the school opens, Emplate attacks some of the students at the airport, but is chased away by the newly formed team. Shortly after returning to the school, Gateway reappears on the front lawn with Monet, still trapped in the form of Penance. Beast later diagnoses "Monet" with autism.

=== M/Penance/M-Twins ===
Monet St.Croix, Art by Joe Madureira

Monet, alongside most of Generation X, are later attacked by Operation: Zero Tolerance. Banshee, Emma Frost, and Penance meet Emplate's henchman D.O.A., who arranges a deal: Monet's location in exchange for Penance. After being attacked by Prime Sentinel forces, Synch synchronizes with Monet and learns her nature as a gestalt being. Skin's cousin Gil sets off a huge explosion to destroy the Sentinels, which separates Nicole and Claudette and leaves them comatose.

Soon after, Emplate returns and fuses with the M-twins, creating a new persona called "M-Plate". When the three of them separate, the twins finally learn what their brother did to Monet. Synch convinces Nicole to reveal the truth to the rest of the team. The twins merge with Monet, restoring her human form and trapping the twins inside Penance.

Returning to normal, the traumatized M becomes self-reliant, harsh and defensive, causing her to clash with many of her teammates, except for Synch, with whom she starts a brief romantic relationship. When Emplate returns, Jubilee causes an explosion which separates the twins and makes Penance a separate entity.

=== Final days of Generation X ===
Synch dies in Monet's arms

When Monet returns, she and Synch continue to grow close. Monet is devastated when Synch sacrifices himself to stop a bomb placed in the academy by Emma Frost's sister Adrienne. After the incident, the team questions Emma's leadership abilities after learning that she has killed Adrienne in retribution for Synch's death. The school closes when the students decide that their instructors are no longer fit to teach them.

=== X-Corps/X-Corporation ===
After Generation X disbands, M temporarily joins Banshee's militant X-Corps to keep an eye on him. However, the X-Corps are soon destroyed by Mystique, leaving M to join the X-Corporation's European branch in Paris.

=== X-Factor Investigations ===
M and Madrox

Following the events of House of M and the shutdown of X-Corporation, M joins X-Factor Investigations, a private detective agency run by Jamie Madrox.

Monet has a brief relationship with Madrox, but this falls apart when Siryn reveals she is pregnant with Madrox's child. Monet and Siryn become close despite this.

=== Operating out of Detroit and return to New York City ===
Shortly after the events of "Secret Invasion", Monet takes part in a rescue mission for Darwin, is present at the birth of Siryn's child, and taking down a shipment of weapons designed to take out mutants. In the aftermath of the battle with Cortex (an evil duplicate of Jamie Madrox), X-Factor unofficially splits due to tensions between Madrox and Siryn. Strong Guy and Madrox move back to New York while Monet, Darwin, and the others stay in Detroit to work under Siryn.

Monet is shown to be dying from a serious brain injury when she battles Pluto, who severely beats her, when Wolfsbane's son Tier arrives and kills Pluto. M dies from her injuries, but is resurrected by Strong Guy shortly afterward when he becomes Lord of Hell.

=== All-New, All-Different Marvel ===
Monet developed a love-hate relationship with the reformed Sabretooth. M and Sabretooth encounter Emplate. Emplate possesses M, cursing her with his hunger for bone marrow. Sabretooth tells M that her secret is safe with him and that she can feed on him whenever she needs. M eventually breaks free from Emplate's control, curing herself of her condition.

=== Krakoan Age ===
M is later seen living in the sovereign nation of Krakoa, constructed by Professor X as a mutant homeland. She is among the X-Men selected to battle Orchis before they can bring the Sentinel Mother Mold online. During the battle, M is killed by Orchis soldiers. She is quickly resurrected by the Five.

Claudette and Nicole St. Croix also appear as citizens of Krakoa, both having assumed forms similar to Penance.

During the Krakoan Age, Monet joins X-Corp, now operating as a business front for Krakoa, and the Avengers Unity Division. She is a candidate for the X-Men vote, but loses to Firestar.

=== Fall of X and Post-Krakoa ===
During the Fall of X, Monet briefly battles Black Panther, and takes part in a tournament to determine Apocalypse's heir. After the fall of Krakoa, Monet is imprisoned in the X-Mansion, which has since been repurposed as a mutant prison run by Corina Ellis. She is later freed, and becomes leader of the Louisiana team of X-Men, alongside her lover Quicksilver.

== Powers and abilities ==
Monet exhibits superhuman prowess in virtually all aspects. She boasts superhuman strength, invulnerability, agility, dexterity, speed, swift reflexes, and impeccable balance. X-Men's Bishop highlighted that Monet holds a "superior rating" across all human physical categories. She is almost invulnerable, capable of enduring direct hits from firearms at a distance and even powerful strikes from characters like Hulk. Much like Hulk, Monet has enhanced healing abilities, allowing her to rapidly recover from injuries. She also displays a heightened resistance to toxins, diseases, and aging. Additionally, Monet has telescopic and night vision, complemented by heightened auditory senses.

Monet possesses an eidetic memory and demonstrates intuitive skills. Psionically, she can levitate and propel herself through the air, achieving supersonic flight speeds close to Mach 3. She has occasionally displayed telekinetic abilities, such as deflecting bullets and emitting thought waves as concussive blasts.

As a telepath, Monet can read minds, project her thoughts into others, and shield her mind against telepathic intrusion. Offensively, she possesses limited capabilities such as mind control and memory manipulation. However, the range of her telepathy spans only a few feet around her. She can also perceive mutant auras.

Monet and her siblings have the unique ability to merge, forming different combinations with varied powers. The twins, Nicole and Claudette, find this merging process particularly seamless. Monet has also gained the ability to transform fully or partially into her Penance form, giving her diamond-hard skin and powerful claws.

In addition to her powers, Monet is adept in hand-to-hand combat and possesses a genius-level intellect.

== Penance ==
Hollow
- Penance as depicted in Generation X #5 (July 1995). Art by Chris Bachalo

Publication information
- Publisher: Marvel Comics
- First appearance: Generation X #1 (November 1994)
- Created by: Scott Lobdell; Chris Bachalo

In-story information
- Species: Human mutant
- Team affiliations: The Loners; Generation X Avengers Academy
- Notable aliases: Penance, Penny, Yvette
- Abilities: Superhuman durablity Powerful claws Enhanced agility and dexterity

Hollow (formerly called Penance) is a character associated with the St. Croix family who first appeared in Generation X #1 (November 1994), and was created by Scott Lobdell and Chris Bachalo. It is a mindless body in which three members of the St. Croix family have been trapped in for some time. Hollow has red skin and rarely speaks.

The powers of the different hosts/prisoners of the Penance form vary, but commonly include durable skin and large claws. Hollow also possesses superhuman agility, as she usually moves around by crouching and padding and leaping on all fours; she has been shown on occasion to use her feet to grab and grip objects and people.

The original creative team behind Generation X, Scott Lobdell and Chris Bachalo, intended Penance to be named Yvette and originate from Yugoslavia. This was never directly revealed in the comic, with Penance's identity as Monet St. Croix being made by the subsequent creative team.

== Reception ==
- In 2014, Entertainment Weekly ranked M/Penance 72nd in their "Let's rank every X-Man ever" list.
- In 2018, CBR.com ranked Lady Penance 18th in their "Age Of Apocalypse: The 30 Strongest Characters In Marvel's Coolest Alternate World" list.
- CBR ranked Monet St. Croix 6th in their "10 Greatest X-Men Introduced in the 90s, Ranked", 9th in "10 Most Underrated X-Men Characters", 7th in "Best X-Men With The Strangest Mutant Powers, Ranked", 8th in "The 10 Smartest X-Men Characters of All Time, Ranked from Least to Most Intelligent"and 1st in X-Men Magneto respects. Her love triangle with Siryn and Madrox was ranked 9th in "10 Best X-Men Love Triangles".
- Screen Rant ranked Monet St. Croix 10th in three lists regarding her strength amongst X-Men characters, 6th in "10 Great Unused X-Men Heroes The MCU Can't Ignore", 7th in "12 Most Powerful Mutant Heroes to Ever Join the Avengers", 10th in "The '90s Were Great to X-Men, And These 10 Superheroes Show Why", 9th in "10 Marvel and DC Heroes You Didn't Realize Were Super Rich", and included her in "X-Men: 10 Mutants Who Are Close To Being Omega Level" and "10 X-Men the MCU Must Adapt".
- Comicbook.com ranked Monet 7th in "7 Great X-Men Heroes Nobody Talks About" and 4th in "7 Great X-Men You Forgot Were Awesome".

=== Muslim ===
Academic engagement with the character has been limited. In a 2021 doctoral dissertation, Safiyya Hosein noted that although Monet debuted in 1994, her Muslim identity went unaddressed in the comics for over two decades, only becoming explicit in the 2015 Uncanny X-Men storyline "The Burning World," written by G. Willow Wilson. Hosein read Monet's casual references to drinking wine and getting manicures, set against her recitation of the Fatiha during a moment of crisis, as marking her as a secular or culturally Muslim character rather than a practicing one, and contrasted this with the more orientalized portrayal of fellow X-Men member Dust.

A 2017 survey of Muslim women in comics by Shamila Karunakaran identified Monet as one of the few prominent Black Muslim characters in mainstream American comics, noting that the prejudice mutants face in the X-Men franchise has sometimes been read as a parallel to real-world discrimination against Muslims. The same survey was critical of the character's handling, citing comics writer M. M. Lynn's description of Monet as written in a "Muslim-when-convenient" way, with her faith surfacing mainly in scenes involving anti-Muslim hostility rather than functioning as a consistent part of her characterization. Karunakaran also noted that the panel in which Monet first states she is Muslim shows her in a low-cut outfit exposing her midriff, which she read as sitting uneasily next to Islamic teachings on modesty.

== Other versions ==
Know-It-All, Art by Chris Bachalo

=== Age of Apocalypse ===
Alternate universe versions of Claudette St. Croix, Nicole St. Croix, and Emplate appear in "Age of Apocalypse", where they are part of Apocalypse's Elite Mutant Force.

A girl referred to as "Claudia" (who may be one or the two merged St. Croix twins) is known as Know-It-All and is part of Generation Next, having merged with the team's computer system.

Additionally, Monet St. Croix appears as Penance. Following her death, Monet is resurrected by Prophet to aid his cause.

=== Others ===
Alternate versions of Monet appear in X-Men: The End, X-Men '92, as a member of the X-Babies alongside a version of Penance, and as the Amalgam Comics character Retribution, combined with DC Comics character Firehair.

== In other media ==
- M appears in Generation X, portrayed by Amarilis.
- M makes non-speaking appearances in Wolverine and the X-Men as a citizen of Genosha.
- Penance appears in the second season of X-Men '97, voiced by Miatta Ade Lebile.
- M received a Marvel Legends figure in 2023 as part of the Ch'od BAF wave.
