= Trinary (character) =

Marvel Comics superhero

Publication information
- Publisher: Marvel Comics
- First appearance: X-Men Red #1 (February 2018)
- Created by: Tom Taylor; Mahmud Asrar

In-story information
- Alter ego: Shilpa Khatri
- Species: Mutant
- Place of origin: India
- Team affiliations: X-Men; Krakoan systems; X-Corporation
- Abilities: Technopathy

Trinary (Shilpa Khatri) is a mutant superhero appearing in American comic books published by Marvel Comics. Created by Tom Taylor and Mahmud Asrar, she first appeared in X-Men Red #1 (February 2018). Trinary is an Indian mutant with the ability of technopathy.

== Publication history ==
The character of Trinary was announced to be part of the X-Men Red comic series at the X-Men panel of SDCC on 22 July, 2018 by Tom Taylor. She debuted in X-Men Red #1 (February 2018), created by writer Tom Taylor and artist Mahmud Asrar.

In 2020, Trinary was set to appear in the X of Swords storyline as teased in Free Comic Book Day 2020: X-Men #1, but she was removed entirely. Regarding this, then X-Men line's editor Jordan White revealed that Free Comic Book Day comics are done early and stories could change when revised, so they had meant to change the story and not the characters.

In 2021, Trinary appeared as part of the X-Corporation team in the "Reign of X" phase of the Krakoan Age.

== Fictional character biography ==
Trinary is a young mutant from India, (Note: Trinary was the fifth character of Indian origin to have joined the X-Men or its substitute teams, after Thunderbird, Omega Sentinel, Kavita Rao and Indra.) who used her technopathic abilities to hack the bank accounts of the top earning CEOs in her country, redistributing the money to the accounts of many Indian women. This led her father to report her, and she was eventually imprisoned by the IMDF (Indian Mutant Defense Force). Before her capture, Trinary recorded a message asking Jean Grey in Wakanda for help. She was eventually liberated from the IMDF by Jean Grey and other X-Men. She joined the X-Men when they were attacked by an IMDF deployed Sentinel, which Trinary was able to control, using it to help the X-Men escape to Wakanda.

Trinary went on many X-Men missions, including the defeat of Cassandra Nova. She also received an offer from Iron Man to become his protege, which she declined.

=== Krakoan age ===
Trinary became a citizen of the sovereign nation-state of Krakoa and was in charge of the secondary and external systems. When the X-Men were on the mission of destroying the Mother Mold in space and preventing the creation of Nimrod, she was part of the scientific team coordinating communications between the X-Men and the base in Krakoa. She had also helped Magik to locate the headquarters of anti-mutant site DOX.

Trinary had gone back to stealing funds from rich people when M invited her to join X-Corporation. She accepted and joined the Board of Directors at X-Corporation and became the team's technician. She connected the interface at their floating headquarters with all the technological upgrades from Krakoa.

== Powers and abilities ==
Trinary is a technopath and can control electronic devices, digital signals, computers, etc with her mind. She can only control items within a certain (unspecified) range.

== Reception ==
In August 2020, Matthew Sandage from Screen Rant commented that the story of X-Men: Days of Future Past would have changed or possibly ended quickly if Trinary was included in the film, as Trinary could have reprogrammed the Sentinels with her mind. In June 2019 while ranking various X-Men teams in CBR, Scott Allan commented that it was Trinary's ability to control technology that helped Jean Grey's X-Men to be higher on the list.

- In 2020, CBR ranked Trinary 5th in "X-Men Red: Every Member, Ranked By Power".
