= Banshee (character) =

Marvel Comics superhero

- Banshee as depicted in X-Men: Chaos War #2 (January 2011). Art by Doug Braithwaite.

Publication information
- Publisher: Marvel Comics
- First appearance: The X-Men #28 (Jan. 1967)
- Created by: Roy Thomas (writer); Werner Roth (artist)

In-story information
- Alter ego: Sean Cassidy
- Species: Human mutant
- Place of origin: County Mayo, Ireland
- Team affiliations: Interpol; NYPD; Factor Three; X-Men; Generation X; X-Corps; Horsemen of Death
- Abilities: • Enhanced hearing; • Sonic scream; • Flight; • Immunity to the mutant abilities of Black Tom Cassidy

Banshee (Sean Cassidy) is a fictional superhero appearing in American comic books published by Marvel Comics, commonly in association with the X-Men. Created by writer Roy Thomas and artist Werner Roth, the character first appeared in X-Men #28 (Jan. 1967).

An Irish mutant, Banshee possesses a "sonic scream", capable of harming enemies' auditory systems and causing physical vibrations. He is named after the banshee, a legendary female spirit from Irish mythology, said to possess a haunting cry.

A former Interpol agent and NYPD police officer, Banshee was always a decade older than most of the X-Men and had only a relatively short tenure as a full-time X-Man. He was a mentor of the 1990s-era junior team Generation X.

Caleb Landry Jones portrayed Banshee in 2011's X-Men: First Class.

== Publication history ==
Banshee's original appearance in X-Men #28.

Banshee was created by writer Roy Thomas and artist Werner Roth, and first appeared in X-Men #28 (Jan. 1967). Thomas originally conceived of the character as a woman, but editor Stan Lee thought that it would not look good for an entire team to gang up on a female villain. The character's original design was similar to stereotyped portrayals of Irish people.

When the character first appeared, he acted as an adversary to the X-Men under coercion, but soon befriended the team and eventually appeared as a member of the X-Men in Giant-Size X-Men #1 (May 1975). The character was forced to leave the team when his superpowers were damaged in battle in The Uncanny X-Men #119 (March 1979), and remained an occasional supporting character for the team for several years. Banshee eventually healed fully, and rejoined the team in Uncanny X-Men #254 (December 1989) for a short stint, later becoming a central figure in the title Generation X, which lasted from 1994 to 2001. Banshee was killed in issue #2 of the 2006 X-Men: Deadly Genesis limited series.

Banshee was one of the feature characters in the 2011 two-issue limited series Chaos War: X-Men. He has since returned to life during the Krakoan Age.

== Fictional character biography ==
Sean Cassidy is born as the heir to the estate of Cassidy Keep, located in a remote part of County Mayo in the Republic of Ireland. Inheriting a small fortune, he graduates as a Bachelor of Science from Trinity College Dublin before eventually joining Interpol. He is later discovered by the villainous Changeling, who invites him to join Factor Three; Cassidy declines upon learning the group's goals. Factor Three, along with Ogre, captures him and places a headband containing explosives around his head to force him to obey their commands. Codenamed after the banshee, a spirit from Irish mythology, Cassidy is forced to perform various criminal missions for Factor Three. On a mission in New York City, Banshee encounters the X-Men. Professor X uses his telepathy to disarm the headband and remove it, allowing Banshee to help the X-Men defeat Factor Three.

Banshee joins the second group of X-Men. After a mission at Krakoa, Banshee remains with the "New X-Men". Banshee accompanies the team on many different missions and is present for several key moments in the X-Men's history, including the first death of an X-Man, Thunderbird. He is also a key player during the first appearance of the Phoenix and the team's first encounter with the Shi'ar. While with the X-Men, he falls in love with Xavier's ex-girlfriend, Dr. Moira MacTaggert. Given his age, he frequently acts as a confidant for both Xavier and Cyclops, eventually convincing Cyclops to change his leadership style to better suit the older, more experienced second team of X-Men.

When Banshee loses the use of his powers due to damaged vocal cords, he leaves the X-Men to stay with MacTaggert.

Theresa Cassidy, Banshee's daughter, is secretly raised by Banshee's cousin Black Tom Cassidy. Theresa later develops sonic powers of her own and adopts the name Siryn. Siryn assists Tom with his crimes until the two are defeated by Spider-Woman and the X-Men. While in custody, Tom makes arrangements for Siryn to be reunited with her father.

Banshee's powers gradually return as he heals and he remains an ally of the X-Men. He later becomes the head of the new team of young mutants Generation X along with Emma Frost. Banshee also serves as the leader of X-Corps, a team of reformed mutant criminals.

Banshee is killed trying to prevent a plane crash caused by Vulcan. In his will, he gives Siryn his family castle—Cassidy Keep—as well as his pipe. When Siryn and Jamie Madrox have a child, they name him Sean in honor of her late father.

Banshee is resurrected under the control of villains twice, before being restored to life by a Celestial Death Seed and recruited by the Apocalypse Twins to become their Horsemen of Death. When Banshee is taken into the X-Men's custody, Beast concludes that healing him of the Death Seed's energy will take years and highly advanced technology.

Banshee later resurfaces as part of the Mutant Liberation Front along with Hope Summers. After a confrontation with the X-Men and the newest incarnation of the Brotherhood of Mutants, he rejoins the X-Men. When attacking the Office of National Emergency, Banshee is caught in an explosion and presumed dead.

=== House of X ===
Banshee later appears alive and completely cured of the Death Seed's energy during House of X. He becomes a citizen of Krakoa after it is established as a mutant nation. Banshee is considered to join Krakoa's X-Men, but loses to Polaris.

Moira MacTaggert is retroactively revealed to be a mutant with the ability to continuously reincarnate after death. After returning to life, she reveals her survival to Banshee before killing him and ripping his face off to enter Krakoa undercover. Banshee is resurrected by the Five, but is deeply troubled by his misfortunes. This is worsened when he is temporarily possessed by the mutant Skinjacker and later coerced into making a deal with Mother Righteous, who gives him powers similar to Ghost Rider. It is later revealed that Banshee was bound to the Spirit of Variance, a rejected Spirit of Vengeance.

== Powers and abilities ==
Banshee is a mutant whose superhumanly powerful lungs, throat, and vocal cords can produce a sonic scream for various effects, in concert with limited, reflexive psionic powers which directed his sonic vibrations. He can hover or fly at the speed of sound, and can carry at least one passenger. He could overwhelm listeners with deafening noise, stun them with tight-focus low-frequency sonic blasts (effective even against shielded ears by penetrating the skull via bone conduction), plunge them into a hypnotic trance, disorient them, nauseate them, or simply render them unconscious. Using sonic waves, he can rapidly vibrate himself or other masses at will. He could generate sonic blasts which struck with tremendous concussive force, liquefying or outright disintegrating targets at his highest levels of power. By radiating sound waves outward and reading the feedback, he can locate and analyze unseen objects in a sonar-like fashion. By modulating his scream's harmonics, he can confuse most scanning equipment. He can instinctively analyze, replicate, and block sonic waves or vibrations from other sources.

Banshee generates a psionic field which protects him from the detrimental effects of his sonic vibrations, though his sonic powers can still injure him when pushed beyond safe limits. For a while, his sonic powers were gone after having to use them up and down the harmonic scale to stop a weapon of Moses Magnum's. His physiology seems fully vulnerable to conventional injury when his sonic powers are not engaged. Banshee has selective hearing, enabling him to focus upon, enhance, or totally block out any given sound in his environment; this shields him from the deafening sound of his own screams, and make him a superhumanly acute eavesdropper in surveillance situations. Sean and his cousin Black Tom are immune to each other's natural mutant energy powers, though Sean's immunity does not extend to the new powers Tom later developed via artificial mutations.

Sean Cassidy is an experienced detective, veteran undercover operative, marksman, and unarmed combatant from his training at Interpol. He is also an American country music fan and amateur piano player. Cassidy also wields conventional firearms, sometimes loaded with explosive "micro-bombs." As Banshee, he wears synthetic costuming designed to resist air friction, usually including underarm wings that helped him glide on air currents and his own sonic waves. The "ribbons" on Banshee's costume (a visual trademark of the character) aid him in his flight.

== Reception ==
In 2014, Entertainment Weekly ranked Banshee 49th in their "Let's rank every X-Man ever" list.

== Other versions ==
=== Age of Apocalypse ===
An alternate universe version of Banshee from Earth-295 appears in Age of Apocalypse.

=== Marvel Noir ===
An alternate universe version of Banshee from Earth-90214 appears in X-Men Noir. This version is a drug dealer, inmate of Welfare Pen, and friend of Angel.

=== Renew Your Vows ===
An alternate universe version of Banshee from Earth-18119 appears in Amazing Spider-Man: Renew Your Vows #6.

== In other media ==
=== Television ===
- Banshee appears in X-Men: The Animated Series, voiced by Phillip Williams. This version is the older brother of Black Tom Cassidy and an associate of the X-Men who is in a relationship with Moira MacTaggert.
  - Banshee appears in the X-Men '97 season 1 episode "Remember It", voiced by David Errigo Jr. By this time, he and MacTaggert are engaged and joined Genosha's ruling council, but are later killed by Sentinels.
- Banshee appears in Generation X, portrayed by Jeremy Ratchford. This version is a headmaster of Xavier's School for Gifted Youngsters.

=== Film ===
- Banshee appears in X-Men: First Class, portrayed by Caleb Landry Jones, though Robert Sheehan was originally cast in the role before being forced to drop out due to scheduling conflicts with Misfits. Additionally, Josh Ramsay (albeit uncredited) provides vocal effects for his sonic screams. This version is an American teenager from 1962 who is recruited by Charles Xavier and Erik Lehnsherr to help them defeat the Hellfire Club.
- Banshee is mentioned in X-Men: Days of Future Past as one of several mutants who were captured, experimented on, and killed by Bolivar Trask.

=== Video games ===
- Banshee appears as a NPC in X-Men Legends II: Rise of Apocalypse, voiced by Quinton Flynn.
- Banshee appears in Magneto's ending in Marvel vs. Capcom 3: Fate of Two Worlds.

=== Merchandise ===
- Banshee received a figure in Toy Biz's X-Men figure line.
- Banshee received a figure in series two of Toy Biz's "Generation X" toy line.
- Banshee received a figure in Marvel Legends' Annihilus build-a-figure series.
- Banshee received a figure in the Classic Marvel Figurine Collection.
