= The 8 Deaths of Spider-Man =

2023 Marvel comics storyline

- Publisher: Marvel Comics
- Publication date: November 2024 – March 2025
- Main characters: Spider-Man (Peter Parker); X-Men; Doctor Strange; Doctor Doom; Cyttorak

Creative team
- Writers: Joe Kelly; Christos Gage; Derek Landy; Justina Ireland
- Artist(s): Ed McGuinness; Gleb Melnikov
- Pencillers: Cafu; Andrea Broccardo; Mark Buckingham
- Letterer: Joe Caramagna
- Colorist(s): Alex Sinclair; Marcio Menyz
- Editor: Nick Lowe

"The 8 Deaths of Spider-Man" is a 2024 storyline published by Marvel Comics. It was created by Joe Kelly after the conclusion of Zeb Wells' run on The Amazing Spider-Man. The story involves Doctor Doom asking Spider-Man to defeat Cyttorak's Scions, giving him mystical armor that will resurrect him up to eight times. The story received mixed reviews from critics due to lack of focus on Spider-Man, pacing, the writing, inconsistent art, and overemphasis on the X-Men.

== Publication history ==
In San Diego Comic-Con 2024, Marvel announced the next big Spider-Man story where Doctor Doom tasks Spider-Man to defeat an evil god and his Scions. In November, it is also revealed that the X-Men will help Spider-Man deal with the magical enemy.

== Plot summary ==
Following the aftermath of Zeb Wells' run, Peter Parker is experiencing an existential crisis of his lifetime as Spider-Man due to his struggles with relationships, social life, awkwardness, and criticism.

After dealing with a couple of robbers, Doctor Doom meets up with Spider-Man to task him as his new champion to face against the scions of Cyttorak. Spider-Man refuses as he resents Doom for becoming the latest Sorcerer Supreme after the Blood Hunt. After leaving an awkward situation with Aunt May, Shay, and Randy Robertson, Spider-Man encounters a demon named Cyntros but is overwhelmed. Doom arrives and Spider-Man immediately accepts his offer, with Doom giving Spider-Man mystical armor that will revive him up to eight times to battle Cyttorak. Spider-Man fights Cyttorak again, but is defeated by Spaghettification. Spider-Man is revived and meets the astral projection of Doctor Strange, who explains that Spider-Man needs to die seven more times and fight the rest of Cyttorak's Scions or else the world will end.

With the help of Black Cat, Spider-Man and Strange break into the Sanctum's Santorium to get a book that details Cyttorak's history. Elsewhere, Cyttorak's Scions plot to defeat Spider-Man; Norman Osborn meets up with Peter to tell him that he is shutting down Oscorp for good. Peter gets an alert and defeats with Cyperion (one of the Scions). While on a date with Shay and Randy, Peter sees a demonic child. The demonic child (actually a Scion named Cyrios) takes Peter to the past where Uncle Ben was teaching him how to ride a bike, and tells him that she will visit all the painful moments in his life. Spider-Man knocks her out and meets with Black Cat to discuss what has been happening recently. In Alaska, Magik, Juggernaut, and Kid Omega are playing video games when Juggernaut senses something is wrong. Peter Parker asks Strange on how to stop dying, but Strange declines to answer. Spider-Man defeats one of the Scions (Callix) and the other Scion (Cyra) meets up with him to give him an orb that will prevent him from dying.

Cyra gives Spider-Man an orb to convince him that life is meaningless, and nothing matters if they die. While Spider-Man is distracted due to feeling the deaths of multiple people, Callix attacks and kills Spider-Man. Spider-Man is resurrected, but tell Doctor Strange that he quits. Strange convinces Phil Coulson to motivate Peter Parker by analyzing all of Peter's traumas to discover that he was chosen for his ability to understand the responsibility that is always given to him. However, Peter is too depressed and leaves Coulson.

Cradios heads out to wreak havoc when the X-Men confront him after Juggernaut senses Cytorrax. While Peter Parker feels hopeless after experiencing the deaths of multiple civilians and is distant when Spider-Boy, Shay Evans and Black Cat confront him. Cyrax meets with Doctor Strange and wonders why he finds comfort and connection to people. Peter sleeps with Black Cat and senses Cradios, but does not care. The X-Men (Cyclops, Magik, Psylocke, Kid Omega, and Temper) take on Cradios, while Strange tries persuading Peter by talking about the Blight which will destroy humanity but fails. Cyra arrives to talk to Peter, but senses her brother Callix killing Cradios after being corrupted by the Blight.

Callix sends his hounds to attack F.E.A.S.T where Aunt May resides. Cyra teleports Peter to the battlefield where he is horrified that May and everyone is dead. Peter finally regains motivation, and uses his Reeds to revive everyone and joins the fight against Callix. Near the end, Cyra realizes that Callix infected Kid Omega and Temper with the Blight and teleports Peter to a pocket dimension to tell Peter that they need to go to the Crimson Cosmos where her father is before Callix absorbs the remaining Scions. When they arrive, Peter's neck is snapped by Callix as Phil Coulson arrives.

Cyclops, Kid Omega, and Magik, with the help of Magneto and Beast help free the rest of the X-Men to calm down the Juggernaut. Meanwhile, Callix reveals he partnered with the Blight because he could not stand being in Cyttorak's shadow, and attacks Cyttorak. Doctor Strange and Doctor Doom arrive to calm the chaos while Phil Coulson realizes that Cyrax switched sides because she saw how Spider-Man endured the lives she forced him to witness to break him. Cyrax sacrifices her immortality to revive Spider-Man, and he becomes Spider-naut. Spider-naut punches Callix, which frees Juggernaut of the Blight's control. Cyrax meets with Cyttorak, while Spider-naut goes to the Blight's true form in space to continuously cast the Casket of Cyttorak. Cyttorak meets with Spider-Man, and after hearing Spider-Man's speech on how beautiful life is because it is fragile, Cyttorak takes Spider-Man's place to hold off the Blight for eternity. Peter and Black Cat part ways amicably, Callix is imprisoned, and Peter and Shay reconcile.

== Critical reception ==
The storyline received mixed reviews, with critics criticizing the lack of consistent writers, lack of emphasis on Spider-Man and the villains, and the overemphasis on the X-Men. David Brooke from AIPT wrote "Amazing Spider-Man #65.DEATHS offers a thoughtful and emotionally resonant exploration of death and perseverance. However, Spider-Man's passive role and the absence of action may leave some readers wanting more. This issue is worth reading for its introspective take, but it might not fully satisfy those expecting a traditional Spider-Man adventure."

According to ComicbookRoundup, the entire storyline received an average rating of 7.4 out of 10 based on 245 reviews, indicated mixed or average reviews.

== Collected editions ==
Title	Material Collected	Published Date	ISBSN
The Amazing Spider-Man: The 8 Deaths of Spider-Man	Amazing Spider-Man (2022) #61-70	July 22, 2025	1302961969
