= Avengers vs. X-Men =

2012 Marvel comic book series

- Cover of Avengers vs. X-Men #1 (April 2012); Art by Jim Cheung

Publication information
- Publisher: Marvel Comics
- Genre: Superhero; Crossover
- Publication date: April – October 2012
- Main character(s): Scarlet Witch; Hope Summers; Avengers; New Avengers; Secret Avengers; Avengers Academy; Cyclops's X-Men; Wolverine's X-Men; Phoenix Force

Creative team
- Written by: Brian Michael Bendis; Matt Fraction; Jason Aaron; Ed Brubaker; Jonathan Hickman
- Artist(s): John Romita Jr. Olivier Coipel; Adam Kubert

Avengers vs. X-Men (AvX or AvsX) is a 2012 crossover storyline that was featured in comic books published by Marvel Comics. The event, consisting of an eponymous limited series and numerous tie-in books, involves the return of the Phoenix Force and the subsequent war between the Avengers and the X-Men. The 12-issue twice-monthly series was first published in April 2012, and features a storyline by Jason Aaron, Brian Michael Bendis, Ed Brubaker, Jonathan Hickman and Matt Fraction, with a rotating team of artists including John Romita Jr., Olivier Coipel and Adam Kubert.

The event was preceded by the four-issue limited series Avengers: X-Sanction by Jeph Loeb and Ed McGuinness and Avengers vs. X-Men #0. Avengers vs. X-Men also ties into the limited series AVX: VS, described as "the fight book" which expands upon many of the one-on-one battles featured in the main series, the digital series; Avengers vs. X-Men: Infinite, and into a number of ongoing series including Avengers, Avengers Academy, New Avengers, Secret Avengers, Uncanny X-Men, Wolverine and the X-Men and X-Men: Legacy. The event was succeeded by the limited series AvX: Consequences.

Despite receiving mixed reviews from critics, Avengers vs. X-Men was a commercial success that topped the comic-book sales charts for several months, from April to October 2012. The repercussions of the storyline resulted in the new status quo of the Marvel Universe presented in the company's Marvel NOW! relaunch initiative.

== Publication history ==
In December 2011, Marvel Comics announced the launch of Avengers vs. X-Men, a 12-issue twice-monthly series featuring writers Brian Michael Bendis, Jason Aaron, Ed Brubaker, Jonathan Hickman and Matt Fraction, debuting in April 2012. The series focuses on the return of the Phoenix Force, the cosmic entity of death and rebirth, as it looks for its new host, believed to be the teenage mutant Hope Summers, who will possess all of its power. Cyclops and the other X-Men want to protect her and prepare her as if she's to be the mutant savior, while Captain America and the Avengers want her handed over to them so they can figure out what to do with her and keep the world safe from a potentially deadly fate. Brubaker described the series as "...one of those legendary ideas: What if the Avengers fought the X-Men?". Marvel's editor-in-chief Axel Alonso said "You've got two populations whose motivations are simple and understandable and defensible. That's part of the beauty of this. You're seeing a story that evolves out of 'What would you do?'"

The idea of an Avengers vs. X-Men crossover is not entirely new; in fact prior to Avengers vs. X-Men both the Avengers and the X-Men had already met, clashed, and teamed up with each other, starting with Uncanny X-Men #9 in 1964 and followed by Avengers Annual #10 in 1980, X-Men vs. the Avengers in 1987, Avengers/X-Men: Bloodties in 1992, Onslaught in 1996, and House of M in 2005. Some of the X-Men have also joined the Avengers, most notably Beast and Wolverine, while Quicksilver and Scarlet Witch had ties to Magneto's Brotherhood of Mutants before defecting and becoming members of the Avengers. Mystique, Deathbird, and Rogue also debuted in Avengers related titles such as Ms. Marvel and Avengers.

Avengers: X-Sanction, a four-issue miniseries published in December 2011 by writer Jeph Loeb with artist Ed McGuinness led directly into Avengers vs. X-Men. In the series, Cable learns something is going to happen to his daughter, Hope Summers, and that the Avengers are responsible. So, he targets them one by one starting with their leader, Captain America. Loeb said "It's a story about a father and what he's willing to do in order to protect his family. There are lots of Easter eggs that will give you hints of this cataclysmic thing that is on the horizon. But by the same token, it is a story that is really driven by Cable and what he has learned in his journey through time".

The prologue Avengers vs. X-Men #0, illustrated by Frank Cho, published in March 2012, offers two short stories, one starring Scarlet Witch by Avengers writer Brian Michael Bendis, and another starring Hope Summers, the girl who many feel is the next host of the Phoenix by Wolverine and the X-Men writer Jason Aaron. Bendis wrote Avengers: Disassembled, where Scarlet Witch lost control of her magical powers and turned on the Avengers which led to the alternate-reality event series, House of M and her depowering of most of the mutant population. Bendis said in the series, "[Scarlet Witch is] faced with a situation that could either redeem her, which would be crazy awesome, or make things worse, depending on the choices she makes and the sides she takes and the moments she chooses to interact with the story... Now Hope [Summers] is the same way but there's kind of a flip: She has everything to lose. There is something elegant in the way she's been told forever and ever, 'You're meant for something, you're meant for this, do what you're supposed to do.' Just because everyone's yelling at you that this is what you're supposed to do doesn't mean you can or should, and I think everyone can relate to that, as well".

In April 2012, Marvel debuted the six-issue tie-in series AVX: VS which focused solely on fight scenes. Each issue featured two stories by two creative teams. Marvel's executive editor Tom Brevoort described AVX: VS as "the fight book". Brevoort said, "It's the least essential read of AvX and yet it will probably be the best-selling. From the first page, somebody is going to punch somebody else and by the last page, somebody else is punching somebody else in the face".

In March 2012, Marvel announced the debut of Infinite Comics, a format of digital comics. Marvel Entertainment's Chief Creative Officer Joe Quesada said, "Infinite Comics are a new technique in comics storytelling that is built specifically for the digital world yet in a very elegant way manages to keep the purity of what makes a comic a 'comic'. It gives readers the same feel of reading a traditional comic while also offering a whole new experience that really feels like the future of where the medium is headed." The first Infinite Comics is Avengers vs. X-Men #1 Infinite, a tie-in story starring Nova, written by Mark Waid with art by Stuart Immonen and Marte Gracia, available on the Marvel Comics app or included with the digital version of Avengers vs. X-Men #1. Quesada said, "While AvX is a huge story, we only have so much room by which to tell it. Infinite Comics will be bringing you some stories that may have fallen through the cracks or haven't been dealt with in great detail".

A five-issue limited epilogue series, AvX: Consequences by writer Kieron Gillen and artists Tom Raney, Mark Brooks, Steve Kurth and Dale Eaglesham debuted in October 2012. Gillen stated the series explores the emotional conflict between the major players left on the board once the battle dust has settled.

In March 2013, Marvel Comics editor-in-chief Axel Alonso announced the launch of What If? AVX, a 4-issue limited series by writer Jimmy Palmiotti and artist Jorge Molina in July 2013. The series that explores alternate outcomes to the Avengers vs. X-Men storyline. Alonso said, "If you've ever wondered what might have happened if the Phoenix Force had found a different host than Cyclops, Emma Frost, Namor and Colossus... then you'll want to read What If? Avengers Vs. X-Men".

== Plot ==
=== Prologue ===
Sam Alexander, a member of the Nova Corps, arrives on the home planet of Terrax with a warning, but before he can deliver it, Terrax engages him in battle. The battle is interrupted by the arrival of the Phoenix Force, the threat that Alexander came to warn against. Terrax is seemingly destroyed in the aftermath as Alexander escapes, resumes his mission and travels to Earth, the next planet in the Phoenix's path.

==== Avengers: X-Sanction ====
Cable (who was presumed dead after the Second Coming event) returns from a desolate future after having been informed by Blaquesmith that the Avengers are somehow responsible for the death of Hope Summers and the terrible future. To prevent Hope's death, he devises a plan to take down the Avengers one by one before they can harm her. Cable first attracts the attention of the Avengers by shooting down a prison transport plane. As the Avengers round up the escaping prisoners, Cable kidnaps Falcon. Captain America follows Redwing (the Falcon's trained pet falcon) to where Cable is holding the Falcon, only to be ambushed by Cable and put in restraints. Next, Cable defeats Iron Man using technology taken from a future suit of Iron Man's armor. Red Hulk arrives and surprises Cable, but is narrowly defeated when Cable infects him with the techno-organic virus. Believing that Cable has gone too far, Blaquesmith sends in Cyclops and Hope to stop him. Cyclops and Hope plead with Cable to release the Avengers, but are interrupted by the arrival of Spider-Man and Wolverine. While Cable is distracted fighting Spider-Man and Wolverine, Hope (guided by Blaquesmith) frees the captured Avengers, while the Red Hulk burns the techno-organic virus out of his body. Cable succumbs to the combined efforts of the Avengers and his own infection of the techno-organic virus, and is brought to Utopia. Blaquesmith tells Hope that she can still save Cable by absorbing the techno-organic virus with the Phoenix Force. Once fully healed, Cable informs Cyclops that Hope is indeed the Phoenix, and that he needs his help to protect her when war comes with the Avengers.

=== Core miniseries ===
In Washington D.C., MODOK Superior tries to assassinate an ex-A.I.M. scientist, but the scientist is saved by the Scarlet Witch with the help of Ms. Marvel and Spider-Woman. After the fight, Ms. Marvel invites the Scarlet Witch back to Avengers Mansion, but Vision turns her away for her actions in the Avengers Disassembled storyline. On Utopia, Hope Summers sneaks out to fight crime in San Francisco against Cyclops' wishes, where she stops the Serpent Society from robbing a bank. Cyclops and Emma Frost follow Hope to the scene, but she tells Cyclops that he need not be afraid for her safety, and that she is ready for the Phoenix Force when it comes.

==== Act 1 – "It's Coming" ====
Some days later, Sam Alexander crash-lands on Earth and delivers a vague warning to the Avengers before lapsing into a coma. Iron Man deduces that the threat is the Phoenix Force and it is returning to Earth. At the X-Mansion, Wolverine tells Captain America that he believes the Phoenix is coming for Hope Summers. Captain America then travels to Utopia to ask Cyclops to hand Hope over to the Avengers so that they can place her into protective custody. Cyclops refuses, believing Hope to be the mutant messiah, and orders Captain America to leave. After a brief exchange, Captain America assembles the Avengers on Utopia.

As war breaks out between the Avengers and X-Men on the beaches of Utopia, Emma Frost takes Hope inside the compound and leaves her with members of the Lights for her protection. Hope knocks out the Lights, believing that she is the cause of the war and insisting she is the one that must end it. Spider-Man and Wolverine infiltrate the compound and find Hope, but are defeated by her growing Phoenix powers. She then leaves Utopia as more X-Men and Avengers rush into the compound. Meanwhile, in deep space, Thor leads the Secret Avengers as they prepare to encounter the Phoenix Force.

After convincing the Avengers that they have surrendered, Cyclops's Extinction Team escape from Utopia in order to track down Hope. The Avengers follow suit, using Rachel Summers to operate Cerebra, but they discover that Hope has masked her trail, unaware that Rachel is working as a double agent for Cyclops. Captain America and Wolverine then get into an altercation aboard the Quinjet over how to handle Hope should they find her, with Wolverine believing that she must be killed, and he is ejected from the plane.

Wolverine is rescued by Hope, who asks for his help to reach the Blue Area of the Moon. Meanwhile, in space, Thor and the Secret Avengers are defeated by the Phoenix. On Earth, the Avengers and the X-Men search for Hope in Wakanda, the Savage Land, Wundagore, Latveria, and Tabula Rasa. Wolverine and Hope travel to the Moon, but on the way Wolverine signals Captain America, who follows them with a team of Avengers. The X-Men arrive soon afterwards, after Emma Frost scans Captain America's mind. As both sides begin to fight, a nearly-unconscious Thor falls to the lunar surface and points out that the Phoenix is coming.

While both teams fight, Hope starts to lose control of herself and, fearing she was wrong about her ability to handle the Phoenix, asks Wolverine to kill her. Meanwhile, Iron Man and Giant-Man prepare a disruptor weapon to kill the Phoenix. Iron Man uses the weapon to shoot the Phoenix, but instead of killing it, the blast separates it into fragments, which bond with Cyclops, Emma Frost, Namor, Colossus, and Magik. The five mutants defeat the Avengers and head back to Earth with Hope.

The emergence of the Phoenix Five. Art by John Romita Jr. Avengers vs. X-Men #5 (June 2012).

==== Act 2 – "No More Avengers" ====
Ten days after bonding with the Phoenix, the "Phoenix Five" have started reforming the world according to their will, providing free energy, food and water to all humanity as well as ending armed conflicts around the globe. The Avengers are summoned to the White House and agree that despite their good efforts, the Phoenix Five must be stopped as their power grows unchecked. Believing Hope to be the key to defeating the Phoenix Five, the Avengers launch an operation to extract Hope from Utopia. They are nearly defeated by Cyclops, but are rescued by the Scarlet Witch. Hope agrees to go with the Scarlet Witch, as Cyclops vows that he will no longer tolerate the Avengers.

During a confrontation between the Avengers and the X-Men, the Scarlet Witch injures Magik, while Emma Frost severely burns Hawkeye. As the Phoenix Five heal Hawkeye, Cyclops reprimands them for their use of excessive force, but Magik demands that they must kill the Scarlet Witch and Namor reminds him that they are at war. In Wakanda, Hope tells the Avengers that the X-Men fear the Scarlet Witch. Meanwhile, Black Panther and Iron Man research a way to stop the Phoenix Five, while Iron Fist and Lei Kung take Hope to K'un-L'un for prophesied training under Spider-Man. As both teams keep fighting and taking prisoners around the world, Scarlet Witch injures Namor. Furious, Namor goes against Cyclops's orders and leads the Atlanteans into war against Wakanda.

As Namor attacks Wakanda, Iron Man takes Lei Kung to join Wolverine and Hope in K'un-L'un. Captain America then assembles every Avenger he can muster and manages to take down Namor in a hard-fought confrontation. Meanwhile, Magneto informs Cyclops of Namor's assault on Wakanda. As the remaining Phoenix Five members arrive in Wakanda, Namor's portion of the Phoenix abandons him and divides itself among Cyclops, Emma Frost, Magik and Colossus. The Avengers retreat to K'un-L'un, as Professor X demands that Cyclops cease the Phoenix Five's actions or he will bring them down.

==== Act 3 – "There Can Only Be One" ====
As days pass by, more and more Avengers are captured by the Phoenix Five, and Hope's training in K'un-L'un shows no results. Several X-Men feel uncomfortable about the way the Phoenix Five are treating their prisoners. Storm arrives in Wakanda in the aftermath of Namor's assault and tells Black Panther that the captured Avengers are being held prisoner in a volcano in Siberia. The Avengers then lead a rescue mission with the help of Storm and Professor X to break out their comrades but are stopped by Magik and Colossus. Spider-Man baits Magik and Colossus into taking each other out, allowing the Avengers to escape. As the Avengers arrive back in K'un-L'un, they are surprised by Cyclops, strengthened after absorbing Colossus and Magik's portions of the Phoenix force.

The Avengers stall Cyclops as Hope retreats to find Lei Kung, who tells her that he has one final lesson and presents Shou-Lao the dragon, the source of the Iron Fist energy. Hope absorbs the dragon's energy and manages to stave off Cyclops's advance. She falls back behind the Scarlet Witch and with a combination of both their powers, Hope sends Cyclops to the Moon. On the Moon, Cyclops comes to the realization that he will need Emma Frost's power as well in order to defeat Hope. Meanwhile, on Utopia, Magneto asks Professor X for his help as Emma Frost's rule becomes more tyrannical.

A joint team of X-Men and Avengers including the Hulk and Magneto physically confront Cyclops and Emma Frost on Utopia, while Professor X fights Cyclops mentally. Cyclops attacks Emma Frost to take her share of the Phoenix Force, and uses the power to kill Professor X. Cyclops then becomes Dark Phoenix.

Seventy-two hours earlier in K'un-L'un, Hope takes her frustration over the war out on the Scarlet Witch, but Captain America mediates, suggesting that their only chance to win is if they work together. In the present battle against the Dark Phoenix, the allies lose ground swiftly as the Dark Phoenix starts to burn the world. As a last resort, Captain America sends in Hope and Scarlet Witch, who together manage to take down the Dark Phoenix. The Phoenix escapes Cyclops's body and enters Hope. Together, Hope and the Scarlet Witch wish away the Phoenix, but only after Hope uses the power to extinguish the fires of the Dark Phoenix and restore the mutant population. In the aftermath, Cyclops is placed under arrest, but willingly accepts this, and Captain America decides to put together a new team of Avengers in order to mend the bond between the two sides, while Hope joins the Jean Grey School.

=== Tie-ins ===
==== AVX: VS ====
During the battle on Utopia, Iron Man gains the upper hand in his fight with Magneto by siphoning magnetic energy from Jupiter. Magneto attempts to counter by pulling in other interstellar objects and as a result senses the destructive force of the coming Phoenix. Iron Man then stops the fight in favour of helping others in their search for Hope. As he is leaving the scene, Magneto tells him to find his daughter, Scarlet Witch. Meanwhile, Thing fights Namor in the sea beneath Utopia, and pins him beneath the teeth of a giant anglerfish.

In the Savage Land, Captain America fights Gambit, who kinetically charges his suit, causing it to explode. However, Captain America manages to knock out Gambit. In Latveria, Spider-Man fights Colossus, who injures him. Despite his injuries, Spider-Man refuses to stop fighting, but flees when Daredevil informs him that Hope is not in Latveria.

During the battle in the Blue Area of the Moon, Red Hulk throws Colossus in the direction of Thing. Colossus in turn takes the Thing outside the Blue Area of the Moon. The Thing, repeatedly beaten and without oxygen to breathe, is defeated. Back in the Blue Area of the Moon, Magik drags Black Widow to Limbo, but she defeats Illyana's demon hordes and forces Illyana to take them back to the Moon. However, after they return to the Moon, Magik stabs Black Widow in the back with the Soulsword, rendering her unconscious.

In New York City, Daredevil and Psylocke fight to a draw as Daredevil makes Psylocke question her motives. In Ukraine, Thor shatters Emma Frost's diamond form, launching the shards into space. As the shards fall back to Earth, they rip through Thor's body and reassemble on the ground. Thor, severely injured from the shrapnel, succumbs to Frost's Phoenix powers.

While the Avengers and X-Men search for Hope, Hawkeye fights Angel in Wundagore. The battle is interrupted when Psylocke arrives at the scene; Hawkeye threatens to shoot her head unless Angel stops fighting. He complies, but is still shot by Hawkeye, and later reports it to Emma Frost. In Wakanda, Black Panther and Storm fight while reflecting about their life as a couple. The fight is interrupted by Wakandan citizens and Storm's fellow X-Men; before leaving with her allies, Storm takes out her wedding ring and leaves it there.

In K'un-L'un, Hope Summers starts a fight against the Scarlet Witch, mimicking her powers. After both women nearly destroy reality, Captain America orders them to stop. However, after both lower their guard, Hope punches the Scarlet Witch in the face, knocking her to the ground. Elsewhere, Havok defeats Captain America, Domino knocks out the Red Hulk, Edwin Jarvis throws Toad out of a window in Avengers Tower, Hawkeye imagines Spider-Woman wrestling with Emma Frost, Storm and Psylocke, Iceman defeats Iron Fist, and Squirrel Girl and Pixie play with Avengers and X-Men figurines, before finding out that the figurines were created by Puppet Master out of mind-control clay, one day before the start of the hostilities between the Avengers and X-Men.

==== Avengers vs. X-Men: Infinite ====
Sam Alexander travels to Earth at hyperspeed to warn Earth heroes that the Phoenix is coming before it reaches the planet. Due to lack of experience, he is unable to slow down when reaching Earth and crash lands in New York. Nova is rescued by the Avengers, but is unable to explain what is coming before passing out.

After the Phoenix Five restructured Utopia, Cyclops's mind is overcome by all the thoughts in the island and he goes to the Blue Area of the Moon in search for a quiet place. There, he remembers Jean Grey's sacrifice and creates a dust replica of Jean to discuss his situation. She points out that he cannot let the Phoenix make him lose touch with his humanity, and he heads back to Earth deciding that he needs to preserve the man that he has always been, not letting the Phoenix change him.

In K'un-L'un, Iron Man and Beast develop a mechanism fed by the Scarlet Witch's hex powers, which use her inner thoughts to consider all the data gathered on the Phoenix Five and the Avengers, in order to figure out their best scenarios to overcome the X-Men. The mechanism comes up with three scenarios, consisting of Iron Man, Thor and Wolverine, but all three end with Cyclops defeating his opponent. However, as Hope enters the room and the Scarlet Witch sees her, a new scenario appears, in which Cyclops is defeated, making Iron Man realize her crucial role in the battlefield.

==== Avengers ====
Following the defeat of Norman Osborn and his Dark Avengers, Noh-Varr locates a secret A.I.M. base. The Avengers take out the base and arrest Monica Rappaccini and the rest of the A.I.M. scientists that escaped following Osborn's defeat. After the battle, Noh-Varr checks in with the Supreme Intelligence of the Kree empire, who informs him of the coming Phoenix Force and orders him to intercept and contain it at all cost, even if it means eliminating his Avenger teammates. In space, after the Avengers fail to stop the Phoenix, Noh-Varr analyzes the reason for their failure and discovers that Thor's hammer can injure and absorb the Phoenix's essence. Thor (equipped with Beast's device to contain the Phoenix) forces it away from Earth. Before the team can celebrate, Noh-Varr declares that he will take the collected energy back to the Kree. While the Avengers wake up in their spaceship heading to a sun and try to escape death, Noh-Varr takes the Phoenix energy to the Supreme Intelligence; however, after the Intelligence declares that the energy will not be used to save Earth, Noh-Varr turns against it and escapes with the energy. The Avengers meet him, take the energy, and declare him an enemy of the team telling him never to return to Earth. Noh-Varr is left in Hala running for his life from the Kree.

Considering the Phoenix Five a threat to Earth, Red Hulk decides to invade Utopia by himself and assassinate Cyclops. He is discovered by Emma Frost and confronted by several X-Men. Instead of imprisoning or murdering him, Cyclops sends Red Hulk back to the Avengers with an "X" carved in his chest. Nevertheless, Red Hulk considers that Cyclops lost the war the moment he spared his life. In Indonesia, Rachel leads a group of X-Men in a fight against Wolverine and the Avengers. Rachel finds Hope, but her mind is drawn to the psychic plane, where she meets Professor X. After realizing that he was just keeping her busy to give the Avengers an advantage, Rachel engages him in a psychic battle, knocking everyone out, except Spider-Woman and Professor X. Later, he states that he cannot fight his own students and erases his presence in the battle from everyone's minds.

A S.H.I.E.L.D. facility is invaded by Mister Negative and his henchmen, taking advantage of the war between the Avengers and the Phoenix Five, but Hawkeye and Spider-Woman defeat them while having a discussion about their relationship. It is later revealed that they were informed about Mister Negative's plan by Madame Hydra, who wanted to get rid of her competition.

==== Avengers Academy ====
The Avengers bring the mutant children left behind by the X-Men after the battle on Utopia to the Avengers Academy to keep them from interfering in the war. Hercules organizes a sports competition between the Academy students and the mutants to ease tensions between the groups, but after a while the mutants choose to exclude themselves. Meanwhile, Sebastian Shaw breaks out of his holding cell and goes on a rampage. Hercules, Tigra, and Madison Jeffries try to stop him, but are quickly defeated. Elsewhere, X-23 tries to decide whether she should join with her former friends from Utopia or her current friends at the Avengers Academy. After talking to Finesse, she witnesses the young mutants from Utopia confronting the Academy students. When Juston Seyfert and his Sentinel try to stop the young mutants, X-23 attacks the Sentinel and forces it to retreat, deciding that the young mutants should not be deprived of their free will to leave the Academy if they want to. Shortly after this, Shaw appears to the teenagers. Before a battle between both parties can become serious, X-23 and Finesse warn their friends that Shaw's body language indicates he does not mean to hurt anyone, but wants to help the mutant children escape. After both sides agree that the mutant children should not be confined against their will, Tigra suggests to fake a battle in order to justify their escape in front of the cameras at the Academy. After the fake battle, Surge and Dust invite X-23 to join them, but she declines. The young mutants leave, but Loa decides to stay at the Academy.

After the Phoenix Five return to Earth and start to reform the world, X-23 feels that Juston's Sentinel should be destroyed, as it still has the directive to exterminate mutants, but he argues that this directive is not its primary one, and that it learned to overcome it. As Emma Frost destroys Sentinels all over the world, she eventually arrives at the Academy and demands to either destroy the Sentinel or have its programming erased. Juston refuses, arguing that it would be like erasing the individual that his Sentinel has become; Giant-Man, X-23 and the other students decide that he is right and attack Emma. As the Academy staff and students fight Emma Frost, both sides discuss the ethics in her attempt to destroy Juston's Sentinel. Finesse asks for Quicksilver's help, but he refuses, stating that Sentinels only exist as mutant-killing machines. After Emma destroys Juston's Sentinel, Quicksilver replaces its central processing core with the one from another robot, thus saving the Sentinel's "life" and memories. After Emma leaves the Academy, Giant-Man and Tigra announce that the Academy will be closed, to keep the students away from the war between Avengers and X-Men.

==== New Avengers ====
Jessica Jones returns to Avengers Mansion with her baby after going into hiding because of death threats made by Norman Osborn. Jessica tells Luke Cage that she no longer feels that the mansion is safe for their daughter and asks him to leave with her but Luke retorts that they will not be safe anywhere. The argument is interrupted by the arrival of Captain America who explains the impending threat of the Phoenix and war with X-Men. Jessica then leaves the mansion while Luke heads off to Utopia with the Avengers to confront the X-Men.

Centuries ago, the Yu-Ti Nu-An had a recurring dream associating a red-haired girl with the Phoenix and a dragon. He later finds a matching red-haired girl named Fongji in the streets of K'un-L'un and has her trained as the Iron Fist. In the present, as Lei Kung reads this account, Nu-An tells him that those records have been sealed until the Phoenix returns and now he must teach Iron Fist what to do. In the past, Nu-An asks for Leonardo da Vinci to come to K'un-L'un in order to help protect the world against the Phoenix's arrival; meanwhile, Fongji is submitted to a hard training, eventually manifesting the Phoenix powers. Nu-An orders her to battle the dragon Shou-Lao as established by the ritual of the Iron Fist. Fongji is successful in her test and becomes the Iron Fist, shortly before Leonardo sees the Phoenix coming towards Earth. Fongji is able to bond with the Phoenix and remain in control of herself, but she feels that Earth is still not ready for its evolution and departs. In the present time, Daniel Rand (the current Iron Fist) tells Fongji's story to Hope and she is taken to the current Yu-Ti (whose visions indicate that she must be trained by Spider-Man). Spider-Man teaches Hope that "with great power, there must also come great responsibility" and makes her reflect about this as the potential Phoenix host.

After being imprisoned in the X-Brig, Luke Cage, Spider-Woman and Hawkeye try to escape. After getting out of their cells and defeating many X-Men, they manage to escape Utopia - only to find out that all the action happened in their minds, as they are still imprisoned in Danger's virtual reality program. Meanwhile, Captain America arranges another meeting of the Illuminati in an attempt to talk with Namor after he is possessed by the Phoenix Force, but the meeting quickly falls apart; Professor X resents how the other four members are subconsciously blaming him for the current mess, Mister Fantastic feels that the Phoenix Five are not actually doing anything wrong, and Doctor Strange and Iron Man feel that the meeting is pointless as they doubt that Namor will appear. When Namor arrives after the others have left, Captain America asks him to stand down, but Namor refuses, acknowledging that he still respects Captain as a friend and ally.

After the battle against the Phoenix is over, a group of New Avengers transport Emma Frost to a prison, but their vehicle is attacked by a group of Purifiers, eager to assassinate her. While being attacked by the Purifiers, Luke Cage thinks about his wife and daughter, and fights back. After the Purifiers are taken down and other Avengers arrive at the scene, Cage calls Jessica Jones, while Daredevil explains that Cage has quit the Avengers.

==== Secret Avengers ====
Thor and the Secret Avengers try to capture the Phoenix in space but are defeated. Meanwhile, a group of Kree priests attempt to resurrect Captain Marvel using a shard of the M'Kraan Crystal, an act that draws the Phoenix away. The Secret Avengers then travel to Hala (the Kree homeworld) to regroup and encounter the resurrected Captain Marvel. Mar-Vell, Ms. Marvel and Noh-Varr attack the other Secret Avengers, capturing part of the team. The Vision discovers that a signal is being transmitted that is controlling all the Kree people, including the three Kree-related heroes, as Krees related to Mar-Vell impersonate the Supreme Intelligence and declare to the Kree people that the Phoenix coming to Hala will bring evolution to the worthy. The remaining Secret Avengers try to free the Kree from the mind control, but are defeated by Captain Marvel. After capturing them, Mar-Vell sees the Kree soldiers killing the people who were freed from mind control and tries to escape. After the Vision frees Mar-Vell, Ms. Marvel and Noh-Varr from the mind control, and after the Krees posing as the Supreme Intelligence kill themselves, the Secret Avengers fight to take the Phoenix away from Hala. Mar-Vell eventually realizes that the Phoenix is after the fragment used to revive him, and after telling Ms. Marvel that she is no longer under his shadow, he willingly allows it to remove the fragment, killing him in the process.

==== Uncanny X-Men ====
Cyclops listens to Doctor Nemesis's report that Hope's latest flare up of the Phoenix force would be noticed and prepares a contingency plan. At the same time, UNIT advises Hope that she must choose her own destiny. Later during the fight between Colossus and Red Hulk, Colossus loses control of his Juggernaut powers and damages the pillar that holds up Utopia. Colossus then forfeits his Juggernaut powers, resulting in his defeat. After Colossus's defeat, Cyclops orders Kate Kildare, his public relations specialist, to send an email warning all humanity that they will pay for the Avengers actions. After the X-Men escape from Utopia, Cyclops defines which X-Men will go to each of the five locations where Hope may be hidden. As Namor, Sunspot and Hepzibah are sent to Tabula Rasa, they come across Luke Cage, Thing and She-Hulk and a battle ensues. Eventually, only Namor and the Thing are still standing, but their fight is interrupted by the Apex's Savage. Afterwards, Magik teleports Namor away, to take him alongside Cyclops's Extinction Team to the Blue Area of the Moon. On Earth, after the battles around the world, Magneto and Psylocke meet Storm and an unconscious Doctor Nemesis at one of their hideouts. While they ponder whether they should go to the Moon to help Cyclops, the Lights escape from the Avengers Academy and go to Utopia, as Hope left them a note telling them to look for UNIT. UNIT explains to the kids that the Scarlet Witch's spell of "No more mutants" angered the Phoenix, and that in other planet he witnessed the Phoenix host needing its five acolytes to calm it and succeed in bringing evolution; however, he omitted such information from Hope because he wants to witness what would happen if the host doesn't have its acolytes to succeed in controlling the Phoenix. Danger, controlled by UNIT, knocks the kids out and erases their memories about the conversation. As Magneto, Storm and Psylocke prepare to go to the Moon, Psylocke suffers a momentary psychic breakdown, at the same moment that the Phoenix bonds with the Extinction Team.

While the Avengers and the X-Men fought each other, Mister Sinister has built his own city (based on Victorian-era London) in the Moloid tunnels in Subterranea. The city is inhabited solely by clones of himself. After disposing of a rebel clone, he explains to one of his other clones that he has foreseen that the Phoenix Force would come after Hope, that the Avengers would try to stop it and clash against the X-Men, resulting in the Phoenix Five. He also knows that the Phoenix Five will soon come after him and intends to take the Phoenix energy away from them by using a group of Madelyne Pryor clones. Colossus tries to get rid of Cyttorak's possession but fails; afterwards, during a meeting of the Extinction Team, the Phoenix Five reveal to Magneto, Storm, Psylocke and Danger (still controlled by UNIT) that Sinister is the one who told Hope about the Phoenix force, and ponder on the danger that his goals may represent to the world. The Phoenix Five leave their teammates behind and track Sinister to Anchorage, Alaska (Cyclops's birthplace), finding out that he built his city underneath it. Sinister then orders his clones to enter into war against the Phoenix Five. One by one, the Phoenix Five members are taken down by Sinister's cloned creatures, including a cloned Krakoa, until only Cyclops remains. He is eventually defeated by the Madelyne Pryor clones; shortly after, Magneto, Storm, Psylocke and Danger arrive at Mister Sinister's city and find out that their teammates were captured. As the Extinction Team tries to figure out a way of rescuing the Phoenix Five, UNIT suggests that Danger infiltrates Sinister's castle and let him get a closer look at the machinery of the clones. While Storm and Magneto fight the clones, Psylocke and Danger enter the castle; although both are discovered; Emma uses the opportunity to convince the Phoenix to fight back against Sinister's domination. The Phoenix Force eventually burns away the Madelyne clones and frees the Phoenix Five, who incinerate Mister Sinister and his whole city, declaring to their teammates that the world is safe... and theirs.

Cyclops and Emma Frost have a psychic dinner and conversation while their bodies fight against the combined force of Avengers and X-Men, both noticing how each other is losing touch of her/his humanity. Meanwhile, Colossus and Magik escape captivity; while Piotr expresses guilt over the things he did and things he wished he had done, Illyana tells her brother that she succeeded in corrupting his soul, so as to make Colossus feel the same way she did. Kate Kildare thinks about how or if she should justify the Phoenix Five's actions. After Emma confesses having a psychic affair with Namor and inciting him to attack Wakanda, Cyclops proposes a toast in their minds; however, his body attacks Emma's, taking her share of the Phoenix and becoming the Dark Phoenix. Cyclops reflects about his power and his humanity during the battle against the Avengers and X-Men, until his conscience reaches the White Hot Room, where Jean Grey calls him an idiot. He lets go of the Phoenix as Hope and the Scarlet Witch attack him, and wakes up handcuffed. After Beast criticizes Cyclops's actions and tells him about the new mutants appearing on Earth, Cyclops states that he takes full responsibility for his actions and that he would do it all again if it was necessary.

==== Wolverine and the X-Men ====
Beast and Wolverine are alerted to the coming of the Phoenix Force, just as Captain America arrives at the X-Mansion to inquire about it. Beast volunteers to join Captain America's team of select Avengers to intercept the Phoenix in deep space. Wolverine warns the faculty of the crisis before joining the rest of the Avengers and heads off to Utopia to place Hope Summers (the Phoenix's likely target) in protective custody. Meanwhile, on the Shi'ar Throneworld of Chandilar, Gladiator prepares his ship to rescue his son Kid Gladiator (a student at the X-Mansion) after communications have failed and reluctantly ordering the Shi'ar Death Commandos to find and kill the Phoenix's host. After the battle in Utopia, Wolverine returns to the school and is visited by Cyclops, who asks Logan for help. Both men discuss their stances regarding the Phoenix's incoming arrival and Wolverine refuses to join Scott's X-Men. However, some of his staff members and Angel decide to join Scott in the battle against the Avengers. Meanwhile, the Death Commandos arrive to Earth. Warbird takes Kid Gladiator away from Earth, but he escapes and engages in battle against the Avengers; at the same time, Hope and Wolverine are attacked by the Death Commandos. Hope is gutted by Flaw, but the Phoenix Force manifests within her and she incinerates the Death Commandos. Although Wolverine intends to stab her, he figures out that he is not capable of killing a child. In the X-Mansion, Gladiator arrives and demands his son.

After the Phoenix Five return to Earth and the Avengers take Hope away from Utopia, Cyclops sends Rachel to track Wolverine. She takes a squad of X-Men with her to Indonesia, where Logan and some Avengers fight them. Rachel finds Hope, but during a psychic confrontation between them, she empathizes with Hope's determination to find the Phoenix and lets her go, later lying to Cyclops that she did not manage to find the mutant messiah. Before Cyclops can force Rachel to tell the truth, Gladiator arrives in Utopia with many Shi'ar soldiers and demands his son, Kid Gladiator. Warbird reminisces about her past and how the Shi'ar taught her to be merciless, as she joins Gladiator, the Death Commandos, and the Shi'ar troops against the X-Men. Even though Gladiator is severely beaten by the Phoenix Five, she prevents Kid Gladiator from helping his father, as her orders are to keep the boy safe. After the battle is over, she takes an almost dead Gladiator to be treated at the Jean Grey School for Higher Learning. Some days later, as the staff that remained at the school faces the difficulty of taking care of it by themselves, Colossus asks Kitty Pryde on a date. She accepts, but at the dinner she expresses her concerns about the Phoenix Five losing control and criticizes the way they have been arresting the Avengers. Furious, Colossus blames the school for changing her mind about him, attacking the staff and burning Kitty's arm before regretting his own actions and leaving. Meanwhile, Iceman gets uncomfortable with the Phoenix Five's course of action against the Avengers, and returns to the school alongside Rachel and Angel after considering the Phoenix Five are no longer themselves.

After the battle between Cyclops and the Avengers in K'un-L'un, the Avengers, Wolverine's X-Men and the Utopia teenagers gather at the X-Mansion. Brood helps Iron Man with the calculations for his mechanism to fight Cyclops and Emma Frost, while the Utopia teenagers adjust to the new school, Toad takes Husk on a date and Gladiator orders his son to return home with him, before telling Warbird that she will remain on Earth to find her true purpose in life. Kitty declares Angel as the school's first graduate and invites him to be a graduate assistant there, before Wolverine takes him, Beast, Iceman, Rachel, Hope and Professor X to join the Avengers in battle against Cyclops. Meanwhile, two weeks after being incarcerated at Rikers Island by the Phoenix Five alongside his inner circle friends, Kade Kilgore tells the reader about his past and how he turned out to be the person he is. In prison, he incites a riot and calls a helicopter to rescue him and his friends. They then decide to move to Westchester. While Wolverine leads the X-Men against Cyclops in Utopia; in Westchester, Husk quits the school staff and Kitty Pryde organizes a school dance. Broo visits the church where Oya goes, noticing changes in her personality, and finds out that the Hellfire Club kids are manipulating her mind and planning an attack against the school, aided by Glob Herman. While the Stepford Cuckoos notice new lights emerging in Cerebra and celebrate the appearance of new mutants, Broo's light disappears as he is shot in the head.

==== X-Men: Legacy ====
The staff members at the Jean Grey School for Higher Learning have a meeting, where Rachel Summers and Iceman reveal their plan to join Cyclops's X-Men in their battle against the Avengers; the other teachers opt to stay at the school to protect the students and prevent them from joining the battle. Later, She-Hulk, Moon Knight and Falcon (alongside Redwing) arrive at the school to prevent more mutants from joining the X-Men against the Avengers. Tensions arise between both groups, and although both parties try to stop a battle between She-Hulk and Frenzy, some students try to attack She-Hulk. She retaliates, severely injuring them (inadvertently), causing Rogue and other staff members to join the battle, while Redwing calls Iron Man to Westchester. After watching Iron Man easily knocking Cannonball out, Rogue decides not to contain her powers and fully absorbs the Avengers' powers; however, she starts to lose control due to She-Hulk's inner fury and Moon Knight's multiple personalities. Meanwhile, Iron Man keeps defeating the staff members, but after Kitty Pryde phases through his armor, she finds out the armor is empty, thus allowing Rogue to attack with full strength, crushing the armor. After the unconscious Avengers are sent away from the school inside their jet, Rogue decides that she cannot keep neutral in this fight, and asks Kitty to let Iceman know that she will be joining them in battle.

After the Extinction Team comes back to Earth bonded with the Phoenix Force, Cyclops sends Frenzy to Narobia to detain an armed militia. There, she saves a young girl forcibly married to a violent man which reminds her of her childhood, constantly beaten by an abusive father whom she accidentally killed one day while trying to defend herself. After Frenzy destroys the militia's weapons, the Stepford Cuckoos volunteer to remove all the bad memories from Narobia's citizens, but Frenzy asks them not to do it arguing that the painful memories will help them resist when another warlord tries to subjugate them. Meanwhile, after Rogue helps citizens in New Orleans, she is warned of a helicopter needing her help, and finds out that Ms. Marvel invented such story to get close to her. Both women fight and discuss their points of view on the Phoenix Five; eventually, Rogue defeats and immobilizes Ms. Marvel, but she gets uncomfortable when Magik imprisons Ms. Marvel in a piece of Limbo brought to Earth. Rogue regrets letting Magik put Ms. Marvel in her prison, thinking Illyana crossed the line, and returns to rescue the Avengers. However, Magik reveals that she let Rogue enter the prison as a test of her loyalty. As Rogue turned against her, Magik sends her to a different world.

=== Epilogue ===
==== AVX: Consequences ====
Seven days after Namor's attack, Wolverine and students from the Jean Grey School for Higher Learning fly to Wakanda to aid in the reconstruction efforts but are warned by Storm that they are not welcome and turn back after being fired upon. Hope Summers decides to live as a normal teenager, while Iron Man and Captain Marvel search for Magneto to no avail. Captain America convinces Wolverine to visit Cyclops, who is being held in a specialized private prison created for the reemerged mutant population, to learn where his Extinction Team might be hiding.

Cyclops baits Wolverine into trying to kill him, but Wolverine lets up once he realizes that Cyclops wants to die and be made a martyr. Once returned to general population, Cyclops is joined by Jake, the only other mutant inmate in the prison. The pair soon realize that all of the guards have left as three inmates approach them brandishing shivs.

Iron Man offers to help rebuild the mystical city of K'un L'un but Lei Kung turns him down and suggests that Iron Man focus on coming to terms with his own internal struggle of science and mysticism. At the Jean Grey School for Higher Learning, Magik informs Storm of Colossus's whereabouts, while Hope adjusts to life at a normal high school but still feels the need to search for Cable. In prison, Cyclops easily defeats his three attackers, due to his martial arts training, and rejects an offer to break him out, choosing instead to remain a political prisoner and not becoming a common criminal.

Storm locates Colossus in Siberia, but decides not to turn him in because of the guilt he is suffering. Magneto arrives shortly afterwards and informs Storm, that he also has decided to leave Colossus alone. In prison, Cyclops allows Iron Man to study him for remaining effects of the Phoenix Force. As he is leaving, Jake is murdered by other inmates, prompting Cyclops to take up the earlier offer to break him out of prison.

Magneto, Magik and Danger break Cyclops out of prison but not before Cyclops has Magik send Jake's murderers to limbo and has Danger disfigure the warden's face. The Avengers arrive to find the prison abandoned except for the prison warden, who delivers a message from Cyclops to Wolverine, stating that he will support Wolverine's school and continue to fight for mutant rights. Meanwhile, Hope's search for Cable has gone futile but Cable appears to let Hope know that she need not continue to search for him and that he will be there for her when she needs him.

== Titles involved ==
Title	Issue(s)
Prologue
Avengers: X-Sanction	#1-4
Marvel Point One	#1
Avengers vs X-Men	#0
Core miniseries
Avengers vs X-Men	#1-12
Tie-ins
AVX: VS	#1-6
Avengers vs. X-Men: Infinite	#1, #6, #10
Avengers	#25-30
Avengers Academy	#29–33
New Avengers	#24-30
Secret Avengers	#26-28
Uncanny X-Men (vol. 2)	#11-20
Wolverine & the X-Men	#9-16, #18
X-Men: Legacy	#266–270
Epilogue
AVX: Consequences	#1-5
Other
Avengers Vs. X-Men: Program	#1
A-Babies vs. X-Babies	#1
What If... Avengers vs. X-Men	#1-4
Iron Man (Marvel NOW!)	#6-8

== Collected Editions ==
The stories are collected into the following volumes:

Title	Material collected	ISBN
Avengers vs. X-Men Hardcover	Avengers vs. X-Men #0–12, AvX: VS #1–6, Avengers vs. X-Men: Infinite #1, 6, 10, Material from Marvel Point One	978-0785163176
Avengers vs. X-Men Companion	Avengers Academy #29-33; Secret Avengers #26-28; Avengers #25-30; New Avengers #24-30; X-Men Legacy #266-270; Wolverine & The X-Men #9-16, 18; Uncanny X-Men #11-20; AVX: Consequences #1-5; A-Babies VS. X-Babies #1	978-0785168515
Avengers vs. X-Men: It's Coming	Avengers: The Children's Crusade #7, X-Men: Schism #5, Magneto: Not a Hero #1, X-Men: Second Coming #1, House of M #8, X-Sanction #1, material from Point One #1	978-0785164975
Avengers vs. X-Men	Avengers vs. X-Men #0–12, Material from Marvel Point One	978-0785163183
Avengers vs. X-Men: VS	AvX: VS #1–6, A-Babies vs. X-Babies #1	978-0785165200
Uncanny X-Men by Kieron Gillen Volume 3	Uncanny X-Men #11–14	978-0785159971
Wolverine and the X-Men by Jason Aaron Volume 3	Wolverine and the X-Men #9–13	978-0785159995
New Avengers by Brian Michael Bendis Volume 4	New Avengers #24–30	978-0785161561
Secret Avengers by Rick Remender Volume 2	Secret Avengers #26–31	978-0785161202
Uncanny X-Men by Kieron Gillen Volume 4	Uncanny X-Men #15–20	978-0785165293
Wolverine and the X-Men by Jason Aaron Volume 4	Wolverine and the X-Men #14–17	978-0785165422
Avengers by Brian Michael Bendis Volume 4	Avengers #25–30	978-0785160793
Avengers vs. X-Men: Avengers	Avengers Academy #29-33, Secret Avengers #26–28	978-0785165811
Avengers vs. X-Men: X-Men Legacy	X-Men Legacy #266–275	978-0785165873
Avengers: X-Sanction	Avengers: X-Sanction #1-4	978-0785158639
Avengers vs. X-Men Omnibus	Avengers vs. X-Men #0-12; Point One (2011) #1 (AVX story); AVX: Vs. #1-6; Avengers vs. X-Men: Infinite #1, 6, 10; Avengers Academy #29-33; Secret Avengers (2010) #26-28; Avengers (2010) #25-30; New Avengers (2010) #24-30; X-Men Legacy #266-270; Wolverine & the X-Men #9-16, 18; AVX: Consequences #1-5; Uncanny X-Men (2011) #11-20; A-Babies vs. X-Babies #1	978-1302946777

== Reception ==
=== Critical reaction ===
==== Avengers: X-Sanction ====
Avengers: X-Sanction ratings
Issue	Comic Book Resources	IGN
1	4/5 stars	6.5/10
2	3.5/5 stars	5.5/10
3	2.5/5 stars	6.5/10
4	4/5 stars	5.5/10

Comic Book Resources gave the first issue four out of five stars, issue #2 three and a half stars, issue #3 two and a half stars and issue #4 four stars. Overall stating that "This series may have had its detractors, but it delivers a complete story acting as a concise set-up for Avengers Vs. X-Men and it has plenty of fun in the process. Sides aren't drawn here, but the causes worth fighting for are defined. From here, Loeb and McGuiness turn it over to other creators for AvX. Their interpretation of Cable's journey is complete and they had a blast bringing that tale to light, something that particularly shines through in this closing chapter".

IGN gave issue #1 a 6.5 out of 10, issue #2 a 5.5, issue #3 a 6.5 and issue #4 a 5.5. IGN's consensus is "If it was big, dumb action you craved, X-Sanction delivers well enough. If it was teases and revelations for AvX, it offers a few morsels. But in the end, even a humble four issues seemed too long for the meagre conflict. Trade-waiters may be better off skipping this book entirely and moving straight ahead to AvX #0 next week".

==== Core miniseries ====
Core miniseries ratings
Issue	CBR	IGN	Newsarama
0	4.5/5 stars	7.0/10	9/10
1	4/5 stars	7.0/10	7/10
2	4.5/5 stars	5.0/10	9/10
3	3/5 stars	5.5/10	5/10
4	3.5/5 stars	6.5/10	8/10
5	2.5/5 stars	6.5/10	5/10
6	4/5 stars	8.5/10	7/10
7	3/5 stars	7.5/10	—N/a
8	4/5 stars	7.5/10	6/10
9	4/5 stars	8.5/10	9/10
10	3.5/5 stars	5.5/10	5/10
11	2/5 stars	7.5/10	8/10
12	3.5/5 stars	6.9/10	—N/a

Act 1 – "It's Coming"

Comic Book Resources gave issue 0 four and half stars out of five, stating that "...It's tough not to judge zero issues, preludes and prologues as anything more than gimmicks. Typically, they're used as a chance to give a story two "first" issues and are either completely disposable or deceptively essential but with "AvX" #0, Marvel has found the right middle ground", while giving credit to writers Brian Michael Bendis, Jason Aaron and artist Frank Cho. They gave issue #1 four stars, again praising Bendis' writing but felt John Romita Jr.'s art to be "a bit inconsistent", explaining "The storytelling is good and he handles the large cast very well, but there are places where the art feels very thin on detail". CBR gave the second issue four and a half stars, writing "This second issue is a comic book hero versus hero slugfest the likes of which we haven't seen since Civil War. Jason Aaron and John Romita Jr. choreograph a fight like a pair of kids with access to the world's biggest action figure toybox and it's magnificent." Issue #3 was given three stars with the criticism that it "is a nice looking comic that ultimately serves as little more than set-up for future fight scenes". CBR's Doug Zawisza gave issue #4 three and a half stars and praised for Romita Jr's artwork, "The art seems to be John Romita Jr.'s brightest moments in this series to this point". Zawisza gave issue #5 two and a half star, marking a low-point in the series saying that it "#5 comes in very tired, but the issue buzzes about with the fury of a second wind before completely passing out in sheer exhaustion.

Jesse Schedeen of IGN gave issue #0 a 7.0 out of 10 stating "In the end, both halves of the issue are enjoyable (the first one a little more so). However, the issue comes up a bit lacking when it comes to ambition or a dramatic build-up to the main event". Issue #1 was also given a 7.0, comparing the event to Civil War while criticizing the portrayal of Cyclops. Schedeen gave issue #2 a 5.0, carping that "Romita's work seems rushed" and "Aaron's distinctive voice is toned down to the point where the shift away from Brian Michael Bendis' script is far less noticeable than might be expected". Schedeen handed issue #3 a 5.5 and stated that like Aaron's work in issue #2, "[Ed] Brubaker's voice feels crushed and diminished in order to fit the mold of a dull, empty blockbuster event". Schedeen accorded issue #4 a 6.5, stating that although "still a fractured and somewhat hollow event comic, AvX at least gained some traction in issue #4". Issue #5 also received a 6.5 from Schedeen writing, "Matt Fraction's first issue is a mixed bag. It doesn't emphasize Fraction's flair for the quirky and unusual... Still, Fraction finds a stronger dramatic foothold in the story, and on the whole this issue manages to close out Act 1 in reasonably strong fashion".

Newsarama gave issue #0 a 9 out of 10 stating that it "does less to set up the impending crossover than to introduce the players involved, showcasing Scarlet Witch, whose return in the pages of Children's Crusade was touted as tying directly into the event, and Hope Summers, whose manifestation of the Phoenix Effect at the end of X-Sanction seems to be the ultimate precursor to what's coming". Michael Doran of Newsarama gave issue #1 a 7 writing that "#1 is a perfectly competent comic book mind you. The art by John Romita Jr., Scott Hanna, and Laura Martin is exactly what you'd expect from this veteran trio. The script by gang-of-5 co-writer Brian Bendis is perfectly professional. But like many first issues in events of these kinds, issue #1 reads almost like a graphic rendering of all the interviews about the event so far – i.e. it's all set-up". Issue #2 was given a 9 by Newsarama exclaiming, "This issue is basically all killer and no filler, as the tense scene that culminated in Cyclops serving Captain America a nice hot slab of optic blast at the end of last issue has quickly given way to a full-scale, knock-down-drag-out fight between the two titular super teams". David Pepose reviewing for Newsarama gave issue #3 a 5 criticizing Ed Brubaker's writing, "These characters just come off as dumb. Whether it's the X-Men pulling a magic switcheroo to escape the Avengers or Captain America suddenly deciding he's going to punch Wolverine, it feels like Brubaker keeps putting the cart before the horse. These characters have to move from Point A to Point B, because there's an outline that has to be adhered to... but it's far from organic, and it makes every character come off as a bit of a jerk. Issue #4 received an 8 from Pepose stating "Avengers vs. X-Men #4 is fun, thrilling, exciting, and most importantly never takes itself too seriously. Pepose gave issue #5 a 5 writing, "This comic doesn't really impress or insult, but mainly just exists, continuing the fisticuffs of the past few months without much in the way of characterization or development".

Act 2 – "No More Avengers"

The Phoenix Force-empowered Magik dismantling military equipment. Avengers vs. X-Men #6 (June 2012). Art by Oliver Coipel. Coipel's artwork was critically praised in this issue.

Zawisza of CBR gave issue #6 four stars, writing "[Oliver] Coipel's art, coupled with the script from Jonathan Hickman, refreshes this series". CBR gave issue #7 three stars, stating it "is full of sound and fury, but unlike Macbeth I wouldn't say it's signifying nothing. Rather, it's the soundtrack to the latest surround sound, IMAX, mega action flick. If you know what it is going in, you'll find something to enjoy. If you're looking for a thoughtful insight into the differences between the two teams and their methods, though, that's for a different comic. Zawisza awarded issue #8 four and a half stars, writing "Adam Kubert and John Dell jump in for the art chores, rendering architecture collapsing under tidal waves, stunning battles scenes and lots of characters shouting... Everyone has a chance to take out some aggression and the end result is not pretty, even though Kubert makes it all look cool.

Schedeen of IGN gave issue #6 an 8.5, the highest score thus far, giving praise to Oliver Coipel, "Unsurprisingly, Coipel really nails the epic and majestic scenes involving the Phoenix Five... But Coipel also nails the smaller character scenes and necessary facial work as well, leading to what is by far the most impressive and well-rounded issue of the series to date". Schedeen gave issue #7 a 7.5 writing, "As with nearly every chapter of this event, Avengers vs. X-Men #7 is guilty of glossing over certain vital parts of the story in its charge forward. Even so, the series remains in better shape than it was during Act 1". Schedeen also gave issue #8 a 7.5 stating, "Issue #8 offers an exciting and action-packed battle. It simply doesn't propel the conflict forward in the way a concluding chapter should".

Newsarama handed issue #6 a 7 while stating, "Even though [the comic] is an enjoyable read, it suffers from feeling too much like a prologue. Yet, with so much on the page, what comes next promises to be huge. There is so much work done here setting up the next step that the story is certainly worth sticking with". Pepose gave issue #8 a 6 stating, "Right now, the plan seems to be eliciting a specific reaction rather than focusing on story... this comic comes off more like a video game than a strong narrative".

Act 3 – "There Can Only Be One"

Zawisza gave issue #9 four stars, praising Jason Aaron's grasp on Spider-Man's voice throughout the issue and stating that this issue was "the most enjoyable to date", also mentioning that "Where most event series begin to trend toward predictability in their later issues, this series continues to offer up surprises and twists on traditional or stereotypically predictable plots". Kelly Thompson of CBR gave issue #10 three-and-a-half stars writing, "What I once feared was going to be one of the worst crossovers I'd ever read has slowly turned a much more interesting corner in the last month, and Avengers vs. X-Men #10 by Ed Brubaker and Andy Kubert continues that positive turn". CBR gave issue #11 two stars, criticizing the death of Professor X and the marginalization of Hope Summers but found praise in the artwork of Oliver Coipel, Mark Morales, and Laura Martin. CBR gave issue #12 three-and-a-half stars stating, "In general, the issue delivers a strong ending which resolves the story's ideas and core plot. Where crossovers are concerned, that makes it something of a rarity."

Issue #9 was the second issue of the event to receive an 8.5 by Schedeen, who praised Jason Aaron's plot, stating that he "manages that all-too-rare balance of character drama and spectacle that most event comics are sorely lacking". Schedeen gave issue #10 a 5.5 stating, "Issue #10 loses much of the momentum that had been built up coming into Act 3. This is one of those chapters that makes you wonder whether Avengers vs. X-Men really needed 12 issues to be told in the first place". Schedeen gave issue #11 a 7.5 writing, "In terms of scripting, AvX #11 is neither the strongest nor the weakest installment of the series.... [Brian Michael] Bendis largely steps back and allows [Oliver] Coipel to go to town, making this a very brisk read. Schedeen gave issue #12 a 6.9 stating, "The final issue of Avengers vs. X-Men delivers an epic but sometimes emotionally underwhelming finish".

Pepose gave issue #9 a 9 writing that it "has what the previous eight issues have sorely been missing: heart. Focusing primarily on Spider-Man as the last man standing against not one, but two Phoenix-corrupted X-Men, this comic puts a face on a large-scale conflict, suddenly giving this crossover some real tension and weight". Issue #10 was given a 5 by Pepose who wrote, "By the end of the issue, I feel like we've more or less gone in a circle, with Hope still being an all-powerful deus ex machina, the X-Men getting evil-er, and Cyclops and Emma both still living to fight another day. This book looks great, but 10 issues in, it would have been nice to be more than that". Newsarama gave issue #11 an 8 expressing that "There's a lot to love about [this issue], even if some of the window dressing doesn't exactly spruce anything up. Lucas Siegel of Newsarama wrote issue #12 "is predictable but fun, with lots of pretty, pretty art, and can actually be read fairly well as a standalone if you just want your Marvel NOW! lead-in.

==== AVX: VS ====
AVX: VS ratings
Issue	CBR	IGN	Newsarama
1	5/5 stars	6.0/10	9/10
2	2/5 stars	6.5/10	8/10
3	3.5/5 stars	7.0/10	7/10
4	4/5 stars	—N/a	8/10
5	—N/a	6.0/10	2/10
6	4/5 stars	—N/a	9/10

Comic Book Resources gave issue #1 five out of five, stating that "AVX: VS #1 is, in many ways, the comics equivalent of professional wrestling. There are big moments of drama. Memorable images. The occasional shot of dialogue that'll make you smile. But really, it's all about seeing who wins the fights, appreciating the techniques of the characters (and creators) and getting invested in the outcome even though it's of no material consequence." CBR gave issue #2 two stars, criticizing that "so far the crossover that this series is stepping away from also just feels like an excuse to see some knock-down, drag-outs between fan favorites, so the need for this title, even as just some between-the-panels fun, is severely hampered. Doug Zawisza reviewing for CBR gave issue #3 three-and-a-half stars saying, "Of the three issues of AVX: VS [so far], this was the one I enjoyed the most, but it was not without flaws. This is a great superhero slugfest comic, but it's also easily forgettable and doesn't make a strong case for re-reading". CBR gave issue #4 four stars stating, "AvX: VS #4 comes out a winner due to the sheer level of fun and wow factor on each page. There is no real story and both writers find a way to make this work to their advantage. The Daredevil versus Psylocke story might be a little thinner but the Thor versus Emma Frost fight more than makes up for it. CBR gave the final issue four stars as well, saying "It feels like unhelpful shorthand to praise a comic for being fun, so even though that's what "AVX VS" #6 is, let's instead praise its other qualities: it's humorous, inventive and routinely gorgeous".

Jesse Schedeen of IGN gave issue #1 a 6.0 out of 10 stating "AvX: VS does exactly what it sets out to do. In some ways it's a more enjoyable read than AvX itself is so far. That said, there are far better and more ambitious books you can be spending your $3.99 on this week". Schedeen gave issue #2 a 6.5 and wrote, "the two match-ups this time are so random and bizarre that only hardcore fans of the artists involved need apply". Schedeen gave issue #3 a 7.0 writing "[Christopher] Yost's segment at least strives for more dramatic depth, but it's still over and done with almost as soon as it begins. If meatier, more character-driven tales aren't in the cards with this book, then maybe what VS. needs is either more than two segments per issue or a lower cover price. Schedeen gave issue #5 a 6.0 criticizing that "both halves of this issue suffer from some questionable characterization that interferes with rather than enhances of the mindless action".

David Pepose of Newsarama gave issue #1 a 9 out of 10 stating, "Unencumbered by exposition, plot movement or character development, AVX: VS is action-figure combat at its most indulgent. And chances are, if you bought this book willingly, that's not a bad thing". Pepose gave issue #2 an 8 writing, "AVX: VS #2 is, in certain ways, an anthology on steroids — even if these stories are largely self-contained and have little to no effect on the Marvel Universe as a whole, these match-ups are an entertaining platform for some of Marvel's best and brightest artists to jam together". Pepose gave issue #3 a 7 stating, "With one fight feeling a little old hat and the other ready to knock your socks off, the end result of AvX: VS is still a win, albeit not the cleanest one". Issue #4 also received an 8 exclaiming, "[Kaare] Andrews's story alone could be enough to justify the entire six issue series. I almost can't recommend this issue enough". Pepose gave issue #5 a 2, the lowest score of the series, criticizing that "With a lackluster opening act followed by second act that needed to go completely back to formula, this issue is one ugly fight, and not in a good way". Newsarama gave issue #6 a 9 stating, "Even if you didn't read the other five issues of AvX: Vs., even if you didn't read any of AvX at all, the talent on display in this issue is more than worth the purchase price".

==== AVX: Consequences ====
AVX: Consequences ratings
Issue	CBR	IGN
1	4/5 stars	7.3/10
2	3/5 stars	7.8/10
3	3.5/5 stars	7.2/10
4	3/5 stars	8.3/10
5	4/5 stars	7.0/10

Comic Book Resources gave AVX: Consequences #1 four out of five stars, stating "With this strong first issue, [AVX: Consequences] feels like a project that's on track for a strong finish. With a strong focus and momentum already moving forward, this feels in some ways to have the drive that the parent series could have benefited from, too". CBR gave issue #2 three stars, exclaming "Only about half of this book works. The first half feels mostly like bluster... However, when Cyclops begins to make his case, both for accepting responsibility and his unwillingness to take it all back because the end result is just too important, the book begins to sing. CBR gave issue #3 three-and-a-half stars, writing "As a direct epilogue to AvX, Consequences succeeds where the Fear Itself Point One issues and Fearless maxiseries missed their beats -- it builds on the event as opposed to eradicating it, giving readers a solid followup story dissecting the ramifications AvX has had on the Marvel Universe's major players". CBR gave issue #4 three stars, commenting that "as a de facto X-Men title between cancellations and launches, it's doing its job. And crucially, it's leaving characters in a more interesting place than where it found them, which means it's doing its job well". CBR gave issue #5 four stars, saying "In AvX: Consequences #5, Kieron Gillen and Gabriel Hernandez Walta do exactly what they should: deliver a strong and logical conclusion to this weekly mini-series".

Jesse Schedeen of IGN gave AVX: Consequences #1 a 7.3 out of 10, stating "AvX: Consequences proves that Kieron Gillen's post-event wrap-up is more than just filler". Schedeen gave issue #2 a 7.8, writing "The second chapter of AvX: Consequences narrows the focus and picks up dramatic steam". Schedeen gave issue #3 a 7.2, surmising "AvX: Consequences #3 loses a bit of its focus but remains a compelling read for X-Men fans". Schedeen gave issue #4 an 8.3 critiquing "if unfocused, AvX: Consequences #4 is still an enjoyable read with some great visuals". Schedeen gave issue #5 a 7.0, stating "Though visually weak, the final issue of AvX: Consequences delivers a memorable finish to Cyclops' struggle".

=== Sales ===
Estimated number of units sold in the first month of each issue's release

==== Avengers: X-Sanction ====
Issue	First month of publication	Estimated no. of units sold	Sales chart position	Ref.
#1	December 2011	93,380	5	
#2	January 2012	58,586	15	
#3	February 2012	53,723	17	
#4	March 2012	55,682	18	

==== Core miniseries ====
Avengers vs. X-Men dominated the sales charts in its first months of release, and was only beaten to the #1 spot by The Walking Dead #100 in July 2012, and Uncanny Avengers #1 in October 2012.

Issue	First month of publication	Estimated no. of units sold	Sales chart position	Ref.
#0	March 2012	134,522	2	
#1	March 2012	203,200	1	
#2	April 2012	158,650	1	
#3	May 2012	175,683	2	
#4	May 2012	178,318	1	
#5	June 2012	186,545	2	
#6	June 2012	190,701	1	
#7	July 2012	179,233	2	
#8	July 2012	174,935	3	
#9	August 2012	174,357	1	
#10	August 2012	169,530	2	
#11	September 2012	167,315	1	
#12	October 2012	171,438	2	

==== AVX: VS ====
Issue	First month of publication	Estimated no. of units sold	Sales chart position	Ref.
#1	April 2012	103,436	4	
#2	May 2012	98,812	6	
#3	June 2012	94,530	10	
#4	July 2012	86,538	7	
#5	August 2012	78,381	7	
#6	October 2012	75,292	8	

==== AVX: Consequences ====
Issue	First month of publication	Estimated no. of units sold	Sales chart position	Ref.
#1	October 2012	73,266	10	
#2	October 2012	62,794	16	
#3	October 2012	59,891	20	
#4	October 2012	58,522	22	
#5	November 2012	58,474	31	

== Other versions ==
=== A-Babies vs. X-Babies ===
In Marvelous Meadows, as baby Steve Rogers says good night to all of his teddy bears, he notices that baby Scott Summers from across the street has taken Bucky Bear. In response, Steve assembles his fellow Avengers while Baby Scott brings together his team of X-Babies and the two teams fight in the middle of the street. After a series of turnovers, the Phoenix appears and demands that Scott return Bucky to Steve. When he refuses, the Phoenix causes a giant explosion. The next morning, Steve's parents find him sleeping peacefully with Bucky, except now there is a giant hole in his room and a crater in the middle of the street.

=== What If? ===
After a heated exchange, Wolverine attacks Namor and fatally injures Storm in the process. In retaliation, Magneto brings down the Avengers helicarrier.

As the helicarrier falls, Hope, Magneto and Emma Frost leave to intercept the Phoenix Force on the Moon. In space, Thor manages to wound the Phoenix Force and Hope turns into Phoenix.

Once the transformation is complete, Hope sends The Avengers back to Earth. Magneto convinces Hope that humans are a threat, over Emma's protests. After Emma warns X-Men and The Avengers, Hope sends a meteor shower to Earth, destroying major cities. Hope and Magneto then confront the other X-Men, offering to spare their lives if they join them.

The X-Men and The Avengers attack Hope and Magneto. As the battle continues, the power starts overwhelming Hope and she begs Magneto for help. Magneto kills Hope and the power transfers to him. However, Wolverine manages to stab Magneto in the brain, killing him instantly. As all the others die, Wolverine is saved by Jean Grey, who returns as the White Phoenix.

== In other media ==
- An issue of Avengers vs. X-Men appears and is involved in the Once Upon a Time episode "A Land Without Magic".
- Avengers vs. X-Men serves as inspiration for the Marvel Cinematic Universe film Avengers: Doomsday.
- The comic was adapted by GraphicAudio as a full-cast dramatised production in 2018. AudioFile magazine gave this audio adaptation a positive review, commending it for "doing the impossible" and stating that "the story sounds as good as it did in the comics".
- Elements of the story are featured in Marvel Tokon: Fighting Souls. Spider-Man and Iron Man reference it in personalized intros with Magik, and Phoenix Cyclops appears as a playable character.
