= Nothing Can Stop the Juggernaut! =

Marvel Comics storyline

- Cover of The Amazing Spider-Man vol. 1, 229 (Jun, 1982), art by John Romita Jr
- Publisher: Marvel Comics
- Publication date: June – July 1982
- Genre: Superhero
- Title(s): The Amazing Spider-Man #229–230
- Main character(s): Spider-Man; The Juggernaut; Madame Web; Black Tom Cassidy

Creative team
- Writer: Roger Stern
- Penciller: John Romita, Jr.
- Inker: Jim Mooney
- Letterer: Joe Rosen
- Colorist: Glynis Wein
- Editor(s): Tom DeFalco; Jim Shooter
- Nothing Can Stop the Juggernaut!: ISBN 0-87135-572-8

"Nothing Can Stop the Juggernaut!" is a two-issue Spider-Man story arc written by Roger Stern with art by John Romita, Jr. and published by Marvel Comics. The arc appears in The Amazing Spider-Man #229–230.

== Plot summary ==
Black Tom Cassidy dispatches the Juggernaut to kidnap Madame Web in the hope that her psychic powers would help them defeat the X-Men. She receives a vision of their plan, and calls Peter Parker to ask him to stop the Juggernaut. Spider-Man makes many attempts to stop the Juggernaut, all of which end in failure. When the Juggernaut reaches Madame Web, he separates her from her life-support system, almost killing her. As Madame Web is taken to a hospital, Spider-Man again tries to stop the Juggernaut, luring him to a construction site and finally trapping him in a pool of wet cement. However it is only a matter of time before the Juggernaut will break free.

== Something Can Stop the Juggernaut ==
During The Gauntlet and Grim Hunt storyline in 2010, a sequel to "Nothing Can Stop the Juggernaut" called "Something Can Stop the Juggernaut" appears in Amazing Spider-Man #627–629. In this arc, Spider-Man discovers an unconscious Juggernaut, and his subsequent attempt to find out what did this to Juggernaut reveals that he was attacked by the latest incarnation of Captain Universe. The current heir to the Uni-Power is revealed to be William Nguyen, a man whose life was ruined during Spider-Man's battle with the Juggernaut, who believes that it is his duty to destroy the Juggernaut. During the fight, Spider-Man realizes that the Uni-Power's true task for Nguyen is to repair the damage to the tectonic plates under New York that was caused when Juggernaut was digging his way out of concrete, but when he determines to continue attacking the Juggernaut, the Uni-Power transfers from Nguyen to Marko, who repairs the damage but chooses to spare Nguyen on Spider-Man's request. Nguyen goes on to write a book about his experience surviving the Juggernaut.

== Collected editions ==
The story is collected as The Sensational Spider-Man: Nothing Can Stop the Juggernaut (ISBN 0871355728). It is also collected in the trade Amazing Spider-Man: The Gauntlet Vol. 4-The Juggernaut (ISBN 0785146148) with its sequel.

Wizard Magazine includes it in its collection Spider-Man: The 10 Greatest Spider-Man Stories Ever (ISBN 0974325368).

== Reception ==
Comics Should Be Good featured the story in its series "Comics You Should Own", and users voted it the second greatest Roger Stern story.

SpiderFan.org gave both issues of the arc five webs, its highest rating.
