= Cyttorak =

Fictional character in Marvel Comics

- Two of Cyttorak's manifestations

Publication information
- Publisher: Marvel Comics
- First appearance: (First mentioned); Strange Tales #124 (Sept. 1964) (Actual appearance); Doctor Strange, Sorcerer Supreme #44 (Aug. 1992)
- Created by: Stan Lee (writer); Jack Kirby (artist); Alex Toth (artist)

In-story information
- Species: Deity
- Partnerships: Octessence; Juggernaut
- Abilities: Nearly unlimited mystical abilities

Cyttorak is a fictional character appearing in American comic books published by Marvel Comics. A mystical entity, he is the deity that powers Juggernaut through the artifact known as the Crimson Gem of Cyttorak.

== Publication history ==
Cyttorak was first mentioned in Strange Tales #124 ("The Lady from Nowhere", September 1964; written by Stan Lee). He first appeared in person in Doctor Strange, Sorcerer Supreme #44 (August 1992; written by Roy Thomas and drawn by Geof Isherwood).

== Fictional character biography ==
Cyttorak is a deity who was previously banished from Earth and took up residence in a dimension known as the Crimson Cosmos, where time does not pass. Cyttorak has existed since the time of the ancient sorceress Morgan le Fay (during the seventh century), and even then offered his magic to his worshippers for power.

Centuries prior, an adept named Gomurr opposed an avatar of Cyttorak. Gomurr received the aid of Tar, his friendly rival, as well as an "Initiate of the Ebon Vein". Gomurr and Tar, collaborating, imprisoned the avatar in the Crimson Gem of Cyttorak.

Shortly after the "Maximum Carnage" storyline, Spider-Man encounters two malevolent demons while investigating the ruins of Doctor Strange's townhouse. Calling themselves the Screaming Masks of Cyttorak, the demons claim to be familiars of Cytorrak who feed on fear and anguish. Spider-Man defeats the creature with the aid of Shroud and traps them in a block of cement.

During the "Fear Itself" storyline, Magik, Colossus, and Kitty Pryde travel to the Crimson Cosmos to speak to Cyttorak. They inform him that Juggernaut has been transformed into Kuurth and is under the control of the Serpent. Colossus makes a bargain with Cyttorak to gain the power to stand against Kuurth. Cyttorak agrees to the terms and Colossus becomes his avatar.

During the Avengers vs. X-Men storyline, Cyttorak is angered after a fragment of the Phoenix Force possesses Colossus. Colossus tries to force the release of him being a Juggernaut with the Phoenix's power, but Cyttorak easily quells Colossus' attempt at freedom. He tells him that he will tolerate this infraction for now and teleports him out of the Crimson Cosmos. Through a miniature portal generated by Man-Thing, Cyttorak detects Cain Marko and grants him the powers of Juggernaut once again.

After becoming Sorcerer Supreme, Doctor Doom learns that Cyttorak's covenant requires the Sorcerer Supreme to fight the Scions of Cyttorak. He gives Spider-Man arcane armor that will resurrect him up to eight times to fight the Scions for him. After Spider-Man uses up all his lives and dies, the X-Men battle Cyttorak's forces in his stead. The Scion Cya makes a deal with Phil Coulson to take her immortality in exchange for reviving Spider-Man. Emerging as the Spider-Naut, Spider-Man assists Juggernaut in defeating Callix.

== Avatars of Cyttorak ==
=== Jin Moon-ho ===
Jin Moon-ho was Cyttorak's avatar before Cain Marko. A poor farmer from Korea, Moon-ho came across an abandoned temple of Cytorrak after fleeing from bandits and encountered the Gem of Cyttorak, turning him into the Juggernaut. Cyttorak ordered Moon-ho to align himself with Japanese imperialists to further the deity's goals of world destruction. Moon-ho dropped his Korean name, renamed himself "Taiko" and followed Cyttorak's command to help the Japanese conquer Korea. Taiko became increasingly remorseful and ashamed as he continued killing for the demon and eventually refused Cyttorak's orders to destroy his home village. Cyttorak took his powers away. Cain Marko eventually found the gem and took over as Cyttorak's new avatar. The new Juggernaut faced and killed Taiko, and burned his village to the ground. Due to Moon-ho's service with the Japanese, he was branded as a traitor by his fellow countrymen and his family was shunned, causing his son Jin Jong-Wu to resent him for many years. He refused to take the powers of the Juggernaut himself after inheriting a shard of the Gem of Cyttorak.

== Powers and abilities ==
Cyttorak is a deity with enormous magical power. He has provided indestructible bands (the Crimson Bands of Cyttorak) to Doctor Strange to use as a shield or to restrain enemies, and provided power to the titanic Juggernaut through an enchanted ruby. The ruby has withstood being thrown into orbit by the Juggernaut, as well as re-entry when it was bumped out of orbit by Nova.

Stevie, a spoiled little boy from the Midwestern United States, managed to use the Cyttorak Ruby to spectacular effects, which were previously unimagined by Cain Marko. He used the ruby with his computer to monitor far away events, as well as using the ruby to relay a message to the East Coast through using a non-operational computer on the West Coast. Furthermore, he could alter mirrors so that the Human Torch's flame was reflected and enhanced back against him. Stevie could animate inanimate objects, which could also turn intangible.

Cyttorak has also demonstrated the ability to create life when he created an entire race of elves out of magical energy simply so he could have somebody to worship and adore him.
