= Black Tom Cassidy =

Marvel Comics fictional character

- Textless cover of New Excalibur #7 (May 2006) depicting Black Tom Cassidy holding Juggernaut's helmet. Art by Michael Ryan

Publication information
- Publisher: Marvel Comics
- First appearance: Cameo appearance: X-Men #99 (June 1976); Full appearance: X-Men #101 (Oct. 1976)
- Created by: Chris Claremont; Dave Cockrum

In-story information
- Alter ego: Thomas Samuel Eamon Cassidy
- Species: Human mutant
- Team affiliations: Brotherhood of Mutants
- Partnerships: Juggernaut; Siryn
- Abilities: (Currently): Bio-organic thermokinesis; Wood manipulation; Environmental symbiosis; Possible genetic immunity; (Formerly): Plant manipulation; Life-force absorption

Black Tom Cassidy (Thomas Samuel Eamon Cassidy) is a supervillain appearing in American comic books published by Marvel Comics. The character is usually depicted as an enemy of the X-Men, and of his cousin, Banshee. In addition to fighting the X-Men, he has clashed with Deadpool a number of times.

Black Tom is a mutant who can manipulate, bond with, and project energy through plant life. He is also capable of issuing concussive blasts with a wooden object, usually a shillelagh. Tom was the black sheep of a prominent Irish family. He secretly raised Banshee's daughter Siryn, of whose existence Banshee was unaware, and conscripted her into his criminal gang. Black Tom was also a longtime criminal partner of the super-strong villain Juggernaut, until Juggernaut's reformation.

Black Tom Cassidy made his film debut in Deadpool 2, portrayed by Jack Kesy.

== Publication history ==
Created by writer Chris Claremont and artist Dave Cockrum, Black Tom Cassidy first appeared as a shadowy figure in Uncanny X-Men #99 (June 1976). He later made his first full appearance in Uncanny X-Men #101 (Sept. 1976). Cassidy also appears in the series Spider-Woman, The Amazing Spider-Man, Marvel Team-Up, Generation X, New Excalibur, Deadpool, and X-Force.

== Fictional character biography ==
A young Tom and Sean Cassidy meet Maeve Rourke. Art by John Bolton.

Black Tom was born in Dublin. He is the cousin of Sean Cassidy, the Banshee, a member of the X-Men. He was also once the only friend of the Juggernaut.

His original principal power was that he could generate blasts of heat through a wooden medium, such as the shillelagh that he often carries. He has a rivalry with Sean, mainly because Sean won both Cassidy Keep, their estate, and the family fortune from Tom in a game of dice.

Tom and Sean were also rivals for a woman named Maeve Rourke, whom Sean married. While Sean was away, working for Interpol, Maeve gives birth to their daughter, Theresa. Not much later, Maeve dies in an IRA bombing. With no means to contact Sean, Tom takes care of Theresa.

Black Tom later becomes a criminal and befriends Juggernaut while in prison. The two become close friends and allies. Alongside Juggernaut and Theresa (now known as Siryn), Tom travels to San Francisco and steals the United States' vibranium supply. The X-Men and Spider-Woman secure the vibranium and capture Tom and Siryn. Convinced a life of crime is too dangerous for Siryn, Tom exonerates her of responsibility for the theft. Juggernaut breaks him out of prison the same day.

After being shot during a battle with Cable, Tom is taken to France, where doctors heal him by grafting a wood-like substance onto his wounds. However, the substance begins spreading over Tom's body. He attempts to stop the spread by using genetic material from Deadpool to gain his healing factor, but is unsuccessful. The substance fully consumes Tom, transforming him into a humanoid plant and driving him insane.

Tom later joins the latest incarnation of the Brotherhood of Mutants. Earlier, Juggernaut had infiltrated the X-Men on behalf of the Brotherhood, but gradually reformed. This is largely due to the influence of Sammy Paré, a young mutant he befriended. Juggernaut rejoins the Brotherhood, secretly planning on turning them when the time was right. Sammy stumbles upon the Brotherhood and is murdered by Tom, causing Juggernaut to lash out.

After M-Day, Black Tom loses his ability to transform into a plant, but retains the ability to manipulate plants. The organization Black Air hires Tom to attack Excalibur, of which Juggernaut is now a member. Though he easily defeats the others, Juggernaut confronts Tom and convinces him to turn himself in for killing Sammy. Tom shows remorse for killing Sammy and states that he was not acting rationally at the time.

Tom is among many mutants who accept the invitation to the mutant nation Krakoa on the grounds that all who call it home forgo any petty rivalries or villainy. These are terms that Tom gratefully accepts; eventually becoming the chief of security at Krakoa and creating a physiological union between himself and the island. When Sammy Paré is set to be resurrected by the Five, Juggernaut considers having Tom witness his resurrection, but cannot bring himself to do so and goes in his place.

== Powers and abilities ==
Originally, Black Tom Cassidy was a mutant with the ability to generate concussive blasts of force and heat. He typically carried a shillelagh, a wooden fighting stick, which he used as a focus for his power. He is immune to Banshee's sonic powers, as their powers cancel each other out on contact.

Cassidy was later transformed into a humanoid plant form capable of infecting foliage and trees to make them a part of his body. Cassidy can generate plantlike clones of himself and others, even recreating their powers. While in his plant form, Cassidy can control the bodies of others by latching his vines into their nervous system. These specialized tendrils can also be used to siphon life energy.

During the Krakoan Age, Cassidy becomes connected to Krakoa, allowing him to channel his powers through its facilities. Krakoa's sentient landmass broadens his senses beyond physical and visual reach, giving him control over its topographic and geographic landscaping, such as causing earthquakes and altering plants and foliage.

== Other versions ==
An alternate universe version of "Black Tom" Cassidy called "Blackie" Cassidy appears in X-Men Noir #1. This version is a drug dealer with ties to the Brotherhood, a secret society of corrupt police officers and detectives.

== In other media ==
- Black Tom Cassidy appears in X-Men: The Animated Series. This version is Banshee's younger brother.
- Black Tom Cassidy appears in Deadpool 2, portrayed by Jack Kesy. This version is an inmate of the Ice Box who is later killed during a fight between Deadpool and Cable amidst a prison transfer.

== Reception ==
Black Tom Cassidy is often noted as an underwhelming villain for the X-Men franchise. Sara Century of Collider expressed interest in seeing Black Tom in the X-Men '97 series.
