= Juggernaut (character) =

Marvel Comics character

- Juggernaut, as appearing in Uncanny X-Men #410 (Oct. 2002); Art by Ron Garney.

Publication information
- Publisher: Marvel Comics
- First appearance: The X-Men #12 (July 1965)
- Created by: Stan Lee (writer); Jack Kirby (writer/artist)

In-story information
- Alter ego: Cain Marko
- Species: Human (empowered)
- Team affiliations: United States Army; Brotherhood of Mutants; All-New Exiles; New Excalibur; Lethal Legion; X-Men; Thunderbolts
- Partnerships: Black Tom Cassidy; ForgetMeNot
- Notable aliases: Captain Universe; Kuurth: Breaker of Stone
- Abilities: Superhuman strength, stamina, and durability; Unstoppable momentum; Immortality; Psychic shield via helmet

Juggernaut (Cain Marko) is a fictional character appearing in American comic books published by Marvel Comics. Created by writer Stan Lee and artist/co-writer Jack Kirby, he first appeared in X-Men #12 (July 1965) as an adversary of the eponymous superhero team. Since then, he has come into conflict with other heroes, primarily Spider-Man and the Hulk.

Cain Marko is a regular human who was empowered by a gem belonging to the deity Cyttorak, becoming a human juggernaut. He possesses superhuman strength and durability, and is virtually immune to most physical attacks; his helmet also protects him from mental attacks. Although not a mutant, Juggernaut has been featured as a prominent member of the Brotherhood of Mutants. He is also the stepbrother of Professor X.

Since his debut during the Silver Age of Comic Books, the character has appeared in over five decades of Marvel publications, featuring prominently in the X-Men titles and starring in two one-shot solo publications. The character has also been associated with Marvel merchandise including clothing, toys, trading cards, animated television series, video games. Juggernaut was played by Vinnie Jones in the film X-Men: The Last Stand (2006), by Ryan Reynolds in Deadpool 2 (2018), and by Aaron W. Reed in Deadpool & Wolverine (2024). In some adaptations (most notably the films), Marko is a mutant who was born with his powers, while in others they simply come from his costume.

In 2008, Juggernaut was ranked 188th on Wizard's list of Top 200 Comic Book Characters. In 2009, Juggernaut was ranked 19th on IGN's list of Top 100 Comic Book Villains. IGN also ranked him as Spider-Man's 22nd greatest enemy.

== Creation ==
The character was named after the Hindu deity, Jagannath, whose towering sixty-foot-high chariot—pulled by roughly two hundred people—moved with such force and devotion that it did not stop, even if someone fell in its path.

== Publication history ==
Juggernaut's debut in The X-Men #12. Art by Jack Kirby.

The character debuted as an antagonist of the eponymous mutant superhero team in X-Men #12–13 (July & September 1965). In the first of these issues, he rampaged unseen throughout the X-Men's headquarters while the team's leader, Professor X, related the character's origin in a series of flashbacks.

After an initial defeat in the following issue, Juggernaut returned in X-Men #32–33 (May–June 1967), and returned again in X-Men #46 (July 1968), then fought the sorcerer Doctor Strange in Doctor Strange #182 (September 1969), X-Men member the Beast in Amazing Adventures #16 (January 1973), and the Hulk in The Incredible Hulk vol. 2 #172 (February 1974).

After the canceled X-Men returned in the mid-1970s, Juggernaut returned to fight a new iteration of the team in X-Men #101–103 (October 1975–February 1976). Storylines in Spider-Woman #37–38 (April & June 1981) and The Amazing Spider-Man #229–230 (June–July 1982) explored Juggernaut's relationship with his ally Black Tom Cassidy.

The X-Men and Spider-Man proved to be regular foes for the character, who appeared in The Uncanny X-Men #183 (July 1984), Marvel Team-up #150 (February 1985), and The Uncanny X-Men #194 (June 1985). Juggernaut guest-starred in Secret Wars II #7 (January 1986), battled a new generation of mutants in X-Men #217–218 (April & June 1987), appeared in a flashback story in Marvel Saga #21 (August 1987), and in a humorous episode in Excalibur #3 (December 1988).

Juggernaut also participated in the "Acts of Vengeance" storyline in Thor #411–412 (December 1989) and returned in Thor #429 (February 1991). Other appearances included an encounter with his creator, Cyttorak, in X-Men Unlimited #12 (September 1996) and starring in the one-shot issue Juggernaut #1 (April 1997).

In 1994 Marvel purchased Malibu Comics and began a series of crossovers that saw Marvel characters entering the Malibu Ultraverse. In 1995–1996, Juggernaut lead a group of Ultras, who were named The All New Exiles. The All New Exiles met up with the X-Men in a special Malibu/Marvel collaboration, The All New Exiles vs X-Men #0, dated October 1995.

The character appeared in Juggernaut: The Eighth Day #1 (November 1999) and Avengers vol. 3 #23–25 (December 1999–February 2000) with similarly powered avatars and attempted a reformation in The Uncanny X-Men # 410–413 (September–December 2002) and X-Men #162–164 (November 2004–January 2005). Juggernaut confronted his stepbrother, Charles Xavier—leader of the X-Men—in X-Men: Legacy #219 (February 2009), and fought the Hulk in Hulk #602 (November 2009).

He appeared as a regular character in Thunderbolts beginning with issue #144, and remained on the team until issue #158, during the Fear Itself limited series.

Juggernaut had a solo comic in 2020, by Fabian Nicieza and Ron Garney. Despite being a character from the X-Men franchise, it has plots of its own that do not crossover with the ongoing Dawn of X.

== Fictional character biography ==
=== 1960s ===
Cain Marko is the son of Kurt Marko, who becomes Charles Xavier's stepfather when he marries Sharon Xavier after the death of her husband Brian, for which Kurt is partially responsible. Kurt Marko favors Charles and abuses his own son, Cain. Cain resents Charles and bullies him frequently. Cain Marko and his step-brother Charles serve in the US Army and are stationed in Korea. Marko finds a hidden temple dedicated to the entity Cyttorak. On entering, Marko finds and holds a huge ruby and reads the inscription on the stone aloud: "Whosoever touches this gem shall be granted the power of the Crimson Bands of Cyttorak! Henceforth, you who read these words, shall become ... forevermore ... a human juggernaut!" The gem channels Cyttorak's power into Marko. The transformation causes a cave-in, and Marko is buried and presumably killed, not being heard from again until a sudden assault on the X-Men's headquarters.

Xavier recounts Juggernaut's origin to the X-Men, and after shrugging off the mansion's defenses and brushing aside the X-Men, Marko is seen clearly in the final panel as he confronts Xavier. The X-Men regroup and attack, while Xavier summons Fantastic Four member the Human Torch to aid the mutants; the Torch generates 'pulses' of flame that essentially hypnotize Juggernaut, distracting him long enough for Angel to remove his helmet, making Marko susceptible to a telepathic attack by Xavier.

Juggernaut returns seeking revenge and is delayed by three of the X-Men while Cyclops and Marvel Girl, aided by the astral form of mystic Doctor Strange, find and use another jewel of Cyttorak, which banishes Juggernaut to the "Crimson Cosmos", the home dimension of Cyttorak. When Juggernaut reappears, he has gained mystical abilities and briefly battles Doctor Strange before being banished to an alternate universe by the cosmic entity Eternity.

=== 1970s ===
Juggernaut reappears on Earth through sheer force of will, although the alien dimension caused him to age rapidly. The panicking villain battles former X-Men member Beast before being drawn back to the same dimension. An entity from his prison dimension reverses the aging process and removes the mystical powers on the proviso that the villain never return. Juggernaut is accidentally pulled back to Earth at the Hulkbuster base by an interdimensional device designed to banish the Hulk. Hulk aids Juggernaut in escaping from the base but attacks him when Juggernaut threatens a civilian. During the battle, Juggernaut's helmet is removed, and he is surprised and defeated by Professor X, Cyclops, and Marvel Girl.

Juggernaut befriends Black Tom Cassidy, the cousin of X-Man Banshee, and battles the first generation of new X-Men. When Tom falls off the battlements of Cassidy Keep after a sword duel with Banshee, Juggernaut jumps after him into the sea.

=== 1980s ===
Black Tom uses his niece Siryn, who possesses the same powers as her father Banshee, to steal a shipment of the metal vibranium. Juggernaut battles Spider-Woman and the X-Men and is the only one of the criminal trio to escape capture. After freeing him from prison, Black Tom decides that the psychic Madame Web could be useful in his criminal pursuits. On arriving in New York City, Tom sends Juggernaut to capture Madame Web; Juggernaut destroys several city blocks in the process, and ignores Spider-Man's best efforts to stop him. He almost kills Web by accident when he removes her from a life support device, and abandons her. A frustrated Spider-Man lures Juggernaut into setting concrete, poured for the foundation of an office high-rise, into which he sinks without a trace; he takes over a month to dig his way out.

Juggernaut, in civilian guise, has a bar fight with the X-Man Colossus, who is at first unaware of the villain's true identity. After another battle against Spider-Man and the X-Men, Juggernaut encounters the futuristic Sentinel Nimrod, who humiliates and defeats him. Juggernaut battles an all-new generation of X-Men, appears in a flashback story with the original X-Men, and battles Excalibur during a mass prison breakout.

=== 1990s ===
Juggernaut continues to feature prominently in Marvel titles battling Thor once again and starring opposite other characters such as the mutant team X-Force, Doctor Strange, the Hulk (allied at the time with the Red Skull and tricking and capturing the Hulk with the same "civilian" guise used against Colossus), Deadpool, Venom, and multiple battles with the X-Men. Briefly, he traveled to the Ultraverse and joined the superhero team Exiles. After his return to the Marvel Universe, Juggernaut suffers a major setback during the Onslaught storyline, being defeated and then humiliated by the entity when imprisoned in the Gem of Cyttorak. Juggernaut, however, escapes.

Juggernaut also stars in a solo story and the "Eighth Day" storyline, which introduces the entities the Exemplars. Juggernaut and seven other humans are revealed to have all been empowered and corrupted by mystical entities, and as avatars enforce their will on Earth. Juggernaut resists the influence of Cyttorak and when captured by other Exemplars is aided by the superhero team the Avengers. Leader Captain America convinces the other Exemplars that they have been manipulated by the mystical entities, who then decide to leave Earth.

=== 2000s ===
Juggernaut, courtesy of a ruse engineered by Black Tom Cassidy, allies with and joins the X-Men; the plan is to destroy the team from within. When Cassidy openly betrays Juggernaut, Marko attempts to change his ways and joins the X-Men. Juggernaut befriends young mutant Sammy Paré, who helps Marko reform, despite setbacks such as a battle with the Canadian superhero team Alpha Flight. When Sammy discovers that Exodus' Brotherhood of Mutants is preparing to attack the X-Men's headquarters while unaware that Juggernaut is the mole in their group, he is killed by Black Tom Cassidy. An enraged Juggernaut attacks Cassidy and his allies, and the battle strands all participants in the Mojoverse.

Juggernaut reappears and joins the team New Excalibur for a brief period. One storyline expands on Juggernaut's origin and reveals that he is only the most recent of a series of incarnations of Cyttorak's avatar; each battles a challenger to the death for the right to retain the entity's power.

During the World War Hulk storyline, Juggernaut's power begins to wane, but by shunning his stepbrother Xavier and returning to his villainous nature, he is able to restore the link with Cyttorak, becoming powerful enough to hold his own against the Hulk. Despite an attempt by Xavier to reform Marko, he concedes that redemption is impossible.

=== 2010s ===
While training his son Skaar, Bruce Banner bombs Juggernaut's house to initiate a confrontation between Skaar and Juggernaut. Skaar manages to win his first fight by throwing Juggernaut into open space, proving to his father that he has the ability to use cunning and strategy in combat, and not simply physical strength.

During The Gauntlet storyline, Spider-Man finds Juggernaut unconscious. The government comes along and transports Juggernaut to a secure facility. Spider-Man sneaks into the facility to ask Juggernaut who did this to him. Then, a new Captain Universe breaks into the room and claims he is there to still Juggernaut. Spider-Man learns that Captain Universe is a man named William Nguyen who wants revenge on Juggernaut for ruining his life during his previous fight with Spider-Man. When he insists on trying to kill Juggernaut instead of fixing the tectonic plates beneath New York City, the Uni-Power leaves Nguyen and enters Juggernaut. Juggernaut, as Captain Universe, repairs the damage to the tectonic plates that was caused by him during the same rampage that ruined Nguyen's life.

Following the Siege storyline, Juggernaut is shown at the Raft at the start of the Heroic Age storyline in a weakened state after losing the Uni-Power. Following Luke Cage's appointment as leader of the Thunderbolts, Juggernaut is considered to join the group. Professor X telepathically contacts Cage and asks him to reconsider, believing he has a chance at redemption despite what he previously told Juggernaut. Juggernaut agrees to do whatever Cage says, partly because he is now suffused with nanomachines which can affect him in his weakened state.

During the Fear Itself storyline, one of the seven Hammers of the Worthy that was launched to Earth by Serpent lands near Juggernaut. Juggernaut lifts it and becomes Kuurth: Breaker of Stone. His transformation is enough to level the Raft, causing a mass prison break. Kuurth makes his way to California and fights the X-Men. Magik, Colossus, and Shadowcat go to Cyttorak's dimension and inform it that the Serpent has control over Juggernaut. Magik strikes a deal with Cyttorak, who chooses her to become the new host of Juggernaut's powers. However, the entity transfers Juggernaut's powers to Colossus instead. Colossus is able to turn the tide on Kuurth before Kuurth is teleported away by the Serpent. During the last battle between the Avengers and the Worthy, Kuurth is defeated by Wolverine using his Uru armor and loses his hammer when the Serpent is killed by Thor.

Cyttorak causes the Crimson Gem to reappear in the ancient temple and emit a call for suitable candidates to become a new Juggernaut. Cain Marko, finally having found peace, senses the call and coerces Vanisher to take him to the Gem's location. He comes into conflict with a team of X-Men, as well as seekers of Juggernaut's power such as Man-Killer. Marko and Colossus struggle with one another, only to realize that they have the same goal—to destroy the Crimson Gem and prevent another avatar being empowered. Ahmet Adbol, the former Living Monolith, claims the Gem. As Adbol wreaks havoc in the countryside, Colossus invokes Cyttorak, and the god responds to his former exemplar. Arguing that Abdol will eventually fail Cyttorak, as all his former avatars have done, Colossus challenges him to try something new: empower him enough to kill Cyttorak himself. Apparently daunted by this prospect, Cyttorak withdraws his power from Abdol and returns it to Marko.

Following a battle with Iceman, Juggernaut is apprehended by S.H.I.E.L.D. and is being flown to a secure location, but gets accidentally summoned by Doctor Voodoo to the X-Mansion. Quicksilver removes Juggernaut's helmet, but learns that he is wearing a secondary protective cap underneath. Juggernaut subsequently attacks Synapse, almost killing her. Voodoo sends his summoned Cyttorak minions to "fix" Juggernaut's armor, sealing him inside it. The Cyttorak builders carry Juggernaut back into Cyttorak's realm and Doctor Voodoo closes the portal.

Juggernaut joins Magneto's latest incarnation of the Brotherhood of Mutants and attacks an Air Force base with them. During a fight with the X-Men, Magneto was revealed to actually be his clone Joseph in disguise. An enraged Juggernaut attacks and restrains Joseph for his treachery and subsequently rejoins the X-Men to help mutantkind. Juggernaut participates in several missions with the X-Men until a confrontation with the Office of National Emergency. General Callahan forces Magik to involuntarily transform into her Darkchylde form, who destroys the Gem of Cyttorak and banishes Juggernaut to Limbo.

=== 2020s ===
In his solo Juggernaut series, a depowered Cain wanders Limbo until he escapes back to Earth by destroying his armor. While recovering at a hospital, Cain is visited by a telepathic projection of Charles Xavier, who wanted to check on his condition. While Cain had been trapped in Limbo, mutantkind rebranded itself as a sovereign nation on Krakoa, but Xavier sadly informed him that Cain was denied Krakoan citizenship due to being human. After recovering, Cain sought to regain his powers as Juggernaut and travels the world looking for answers until coming across the Forge of Cyttorak in North Korea. There, Cain obtains the Crimson Bands of Cyttorak which are then magically bonded onto him, restoring his Juggernaut powers and granting him a new suit of armor that he can now manifest at will. Cyttorak immediately confronts Cain, who tells him that he is no longer linked to the deity due to his armor being made from the Bands, and vows to never work for gods or madmen again. Juggernaut joins Damage Control for work but finds himself facing mounting legal issues over the damage caused by his public activities.

Juggernaut is eventually granted Krakoan citizenship after the Quiet Council of Krakoa votes to grant citizenship to human relatives of mutants and is appointed to work with Nightcrawler's Legionnaires. After months of working in service in Krakoa, Juggernaut is nominated by Marvel Girl as a member for the newest iteration of X-Men. Juggernaut is officially elected to the X-Men, much to his surprise and joy, and debuts with the new lineup at the third Hellfire Gala. The festivities are cut short when Orchis forces attack the Gala, with many mutants killed in the onslaught. Most of the new X-Men are killed by Nimrod, who beats Juggernaut unconscious.

During the "Fall of X" storyline, Juggernaut is kept imprisoned at the Henry Gyrich Re-education Center with Cyclops by Orchis, who rigs a bomb to Cyclops that would detonate if Juggernaut attempts to break free. Kitty Pryde is able to sneak in and disable the bomb, but is forced to abandon Juggernaut and Cyclops after being detected by Nimrod. When Doctor Stasis attempts to transfer Juggernaut's powers to himself, Firestar (who is working as a double agent for the X-Men against Orchis) helps Juggernaut escape without blowing her cover.

Juggernaut rejoins the X-Men, who have been driven underground after Orchis spreads propaganda to turn the public against mutants and their sympathizers. Juggernaut works with the team, other mutants and their non-mutant allies in preparing for their counteroffensive against Orchis, with Juggernaut rescuing Krakoa from Orchis after the living island had been reverted to a shriveled avatar upon being deprived of mutant energy. Juggernaut engages Orchis' forces but is nearly overwhelmed by their Adamantium weaponry until he is backed up by Apocalypse and Sunfire.

== Powers and abilities ==
As Juggernaut, Cain Marko is empowered with magical energies and transformed into an immortal avatar of Cyttorak. He possesses superhuman strength, being capable of shattering mountains, lifting and using buildings as weapons, and extreme durability.

Juggernaut is able to generate a mystical force field that grants him additional invulnerability to any physical attack when it is at its maximum. He is described as physically unstoppable once in motion, does not tire from physical activity, and is able to survive without food, water, or oxygen. Juggernaut heals quickly, as when he was stabbed through the eyes by Shatterstar, the wounds were healed almost immediately.

When Marko gains complete access to the Gem's powers during the Trion saga, it increases his power a thousandfold. Trion Juggernaut is capable of altering the size of matter, growing in size, tracking, levitation, absorbing and projecting energy, increasing his own strength, and creating portals through space-time.

After the Gem of Cyttorak was destroyed, Marko acquired the Bands of Cyttorak, which restored all of his original Juggernaut powers and gave him the ability to manifest armor at will. Due to his powers coming from the Bands rather than the Gem, Marko is no longer bound to Cyttorak's influence or will.

Juggernaut is vulnerable to mental attacks, a weakness that has been exploited via the removal of his helmet, which normally protects him from such. He has circumvented this weakness on occasion by wearing a metal skullcap inside his main helmet. If Juggernaut loses his helmet, he can magically recreate it from available raw materials as long as he possesses the full power of the gem.

It is possible for an opponent with sufficient physical or mystical strength of their own to turn Juggernaut's unstoppable movement against him, by redirecting his motion so that he gets stranded in a position in which he has no escape. The only character to have stopped Juggernaut while he was in motion as an act of pure physical strength was the Hulk while he was War, a horseman of Apocalypse and empowered with Celestial technology.

== Reception ==
- In 2014, Entertainment Weekly ranked Juggernaut 81st in their "Let's rank every X-Man ever" list.
- In 2018, CBR.com ranked Cain Marko 4th in their "Age Of Apocalypse: The 30 Strongest Characters In Marvel's Coolest Alternate World" list.

Sara Century of Collider expressed interest in seeing Juggernaut in the X-Men '97 series.

== Other versions ==
=== Age of Apocalypse ===
An alternate universe version of Cain Marko appears in "Age of Apocalypse". This version is a monk who works as a protector of Avalon, a secret mutant refuge.

=== Marvel Apes ===
Juggermonk, a primate version of Juggernaut, appears in Marvel Apes as a member of the Ape-Vengers.

=== Marvel Zombies ===
A zombified alternate universe version of Juggernaut appears in Marvel Zombies. He is later killed by Wolverine when Wolverine shoves his fist in Juggernaut's mouth and proceeds to use his newly obtained cosmic powers to decapitate him.

=== MC2 ===
The MC2 title J2 stars the son of the Juggernaut, Zane Yama. Yama, who inherits his father's powers and goes by the name J2, joins the future Avengers and later reunites with his father Cain Marko, who is trapped in an alternate dimension.

=== Ultimate Marvel ===
Ultimate Juggernaut, from Ultimate X-Men Annual #1 (August 2005). Art by Tom Raney.

An alternate universe version of Juggernaut appears in the Ultimate Marvel imprint. This version is a childhood friend of Rogue who was incarcerated by Weapon X and forced to act as a living weapon under the direction of John Wraith. Juggernaut later bonds with the Gem of Cyttorak after encountering Gambit and Rogue, who stole the gem from Fenris.

During the Ultimatum storyline, Juggernaut helps Rogue in defending the X-Mansion from anti-mutant soldiers led by William Stryker. He is shot in the eye by a poisonous dart fired by one of the anti-mutant soldiers and dies in Rogue's arms.

=== What If? ===
There are two different stories of "What If" that revolve around Juggernaut:

- In a reality where Charles Xavier acquired the Crimson Gem rather than Cain Marko, Marko joins forces with Magneto and Xavier's disillusioned students, the X-Men, to send Xavier into space.
- In What If? vol. 2 #94, in a reality where Juggernaut successfully defeated the X-Men in their first battle, the Sentinels are released in mass numbers without the X-Men to oppose them and go on to devastate Earth. Juggernaut eventually destroys the Sentinels, but is left alone wandering in a post-apocalyptic wasteland, with most other life on Earth having been killed by radiation released by the Sentinels.

=== Worst X-Man Ever ===
Juggernaut attempted to steal a fortune only to battle the New Mutants. Juggernaut was ultimately stopped when Minerva created a well under Juggernaut sending him to the bottom of the Earth.

== In other media ==
=== Television ===
- The Juggernaut appears in the Spider-Man and His Amazing Friends episode "A Firestar is Born", voiced by William H. Marshall and with stock grunts provided by Bob Holt.
- The Juggernaut appears in X-Men: Pryde of the X-Men, voiced by Ron Gans. This version is a member of the Brotherhood of Mutant Terrorists.
- The Juggernaut appears in X-Men: The Animated Series, voiced by Rick Bennett.
- The Juggernaut makes a non-speaking cameo appearance in the Fantastic Four episode "Nightmare in Green".
- The Juggernaut appears in X-Men: Evolution, voiced by Paul Dobson.
- The Juggernaut appears in Wolverine and the X-Men, voiced by Fred Tatasciore. This version is an inhabitant of Genosha and a member of Magneto's Acolytes.
- The Juggernaut appears in The Super Hero Squad Show, voiced by Tom Kenny. This version is a member of Doctor Doom's Lethal Legion.
- The Juggernaut appears in Black Panther, voiced by Peter Lurie.
- The Juggernaut appears in Ultimate Spider-Man, voiced by Kevin Michael Richardson.
- The Juggernaut appears in Marvel Disk Wars: The Avengers, voiced by Shota Yamamoto.
- The Juggernaut appears in Lego Marvel Avengers: Strange Tails, voiced by Rob Riggle.

=== Film ===
Vinnie Jones as the Juggernaut in X-Men: The Last Stand.

- In the first script for X-Men (2000), written by Andrew Kevin Walker, the Juggernaut was going to appear as a member of Magneto's Brotherhood of Mutants.
- The Juggernaut appears in X-Men: The Last Stand, portrayed by Vinnie Jones. This version is a mutant with the inability to be halted once he starts running and superhuman strength and possesses no explicit connection to Charles Xavier or the Gem of Cyttorak. After being recruited into Magneto's Brotherhood to oppose the creation of and destroy a "mutant cure", the Juggernaut is thwarted by Kitty Pryde and Leech. Jones has said he would like to reprise the role in a spin-off, as he felt there was too little time in The Last Stand for him to imbue the character with depth.
- The Juggernaut was originally going to appear in X-Men: Days of Future Past, portrayed by Josh Helman. However, the character was replaced by Quicksilver while Helman was recast as William Stryker instead.
- The Juggernaut appears in Deadpool 2 as a computer-generated special effects character created through the use of motion capture. Ryan Reynolds provided Juggernaut's voice and physical motion capture while director David Leitch provided facial motion capture. Juggernaut is initially imprisoned at the Ice Box, an isolated prison for mutants used by the Department of Mutant Containment, where he befriends Rusty Collins. Collins frees Juggernaut while they are being transferred to another prison, allowing the latter to destroy the convoy before they head off to destroy the orphanage where Collins was abused by its headmaster. While Deadpool, Cable, and Domino intercept them, Juggernaut fends them off until Colossus, Negasonic Teenage Warhead, and Yukio arrive and overpower him.
- An alternate timeline variant of Juggernaut, based on his appearance in X-Men: The Last Stand, appears in Deadpool & Wolverine, portrayed by Aaron Reed. Vinnie Jones was considered to reprise his role, but declined.

=== Video games ===
- The Juggernaut appears as a boss in The Uncanny X-Men.
- The Juggernaut appears as a boss in Captain America and The Avengers.
- The Juggernaut appears as a boss in X-Men (1992).
- The Juggernaut appears as a boss in Spider-Man and the X-Men in Arcade's Revenge.
- The Juggernaut appears in X-Men (1993).
- The Juggernaut appears as a Danger Room simulation in X-Men: Mutant Apocalypse.
- The Juggernaut appears as a boss in X-Men: Children of the Atom.
- The Juggernaut appears as a playable character in Marvel Super Heroes.
- The Juggernaut appears as a playable character in X-Men vs. Street Fighter.
- The Juggernaut appears as an assist character in Marvel vs. Capcom: Clash of Super Heroes.
- The Juggernaut appears as a playable character in Marvel vs. Capcom 2: New Age of Heroes.
- The Juggernaut appears as a boss in X-Men: Mutant Academy 2. This version is a member of the Brotherhood of Mutants.
- The Juggernaut appears as a playable character in X-Men: Next Dimension, voiced by Fred Tatasciore. This version is a member of the Brotherhood of Mutants.
- The Juggernaut appears as a boss in X2: Wolverine's Revenge, voiced again by Fred Tatasciore.
- The Juggernaut appears as a boss in X-Men Legends, voiced by John DiMaggio.
- The Juggernaut appears as a playable character in X-Men Legends II: Rise of Apocalypse, voiced again by John DiMaggio. This version is a member of the Brotherhood of Mutants.
- The Juggernaut appears as a boss in the Game Boy Advance version of X-Men: The Official Game.
- The Juggernaut appears as a playable character in Marvel: Ultimate Alliance 2, voiced again by John DiMaggio. Additionally, his Ultimate Marvel counterpart appears as an unlockable alternate skin.
- The Juggernaut appears as a boss in Spider-Man: Shattered Dimensions, voiced by Matt Willig. While evading Silver Sable and the Wild Pack, who pursue him for a bounty on his head, he unknowingly picks up a fragment of the Tablet of Order and Chaos that Spider-Man was after. After losing his helmet while fighting Spider-Man, Juggernaut discovers the fragment and uses its power to strengthen himself. Due to the fragment interfering with the Gem of Cyttorak, Spider-Man is able to defeat him. Following this, Juggernaut is apprehended by the Wild Pack.
- The Juggernaut appears as a boss in Marvel Super Hero Squad Online, voiced by Travis Willingham.
- The Juggernaut appears in X-Men: Destiny, voiced again by Fred Tatasciore. This version is a member of the Brotherhood of Mutants.
- The Juggernaut appears as a boss and unlockable character in Marvel: Avengers Alliance. This version is a member of the Brotherhood of Mutants.
- The Juggernaut appears as a boss and playable character in Marvel Heroes, voiced again by Fred Tatasciore.
- The Juggernaut appears in Lego Marvel Super Heroes, voiced by Andrew Kishino. This version is a member of the Brotherhood of Mutants.
- The Juggernaut appears in Marvel Ultimate Alliance 3: The Black Order, voiced again by Peter Lurie. This version is a member of the Brotherhood of Mutants.

=== Books ===
- The Juggernaut appears as a holodeck simulation in Planet X.
- The Juggernaut appears in the novel X-Men: The Jewels of Cyttorak (ISBN 1-57297-329-3).
- The Juggernaut appears in the third novel of the X-Men: Mutant Empire trilogy, fighting alongside the X-Men to stop Magneto from conquering Manhattan.

=== Music ===
The song "Legendary Iron Hood" by Open Mike Eagle from the album Brick Body Kids Still Daydream is written from the perspective of the Juggernaut.

== Internet parody ==
On February 14, 2006, the parody troupe My Way Entertainment released "The Juggernaut Bitch!!", an overdub of the X-Men: The Animated Series episode "The Cry of the Banshee". "The Juggernaut Bitch!!" uses a variety of slang, profanity and non sequiturs through ad-libbing. The parody includes the often-repeated line, "Don't you know who the fuck I am? I'm the Juggernaut, bitch!". At first, the clip was made available on the duo's college website, but when YouTube became popular, so did the parody.

The meme became so popular that the line was included in X-Men: The Last Stand during Juggernaut's fight with Kitty Pryde. In June 2006, My Way released a sequel, "J2: Juggment Day", using footage from the episode "Juggernaut Returns". On June 10, 2007, My Way released a second sequel, titled "J3: Shadow of the Colossi", using footage from "The Unstoppable Juggernaut" and Pryde of the X-Men. The video game Call of Duty: Modern Warfare 2 has an achievement called "I'm the Juggernaut...", which references the parody.

== Collected editions ==
Title	Material collected	Published date	ISBN
Iron Man by Kurt Busiek & Sean Chen Omnibus	Juggernaut (vol. 2) #1 and Iron Man (vol. 3) #1-25, Captain America (vol. 3) #8, Quicksilver #10, Avengers (vol. 3) #7, Iron Man & Captain America Annual 1998, Fantastic Four (vol. 3) #15, Iron Man Annual 1999, Thor (vol. 3) #17, Peter Parker: Spider -Man #11, Iron Man: The Iron Age #1-2	September 2013	978-0785168140
X-Men: Black	X-Men: Black - Juggernaut #1 and X-Men: Black - Emma Frost #1, X-Men: Black - Mystique #1, X-Men: Black - Mojo #1	March 2019	978-1302915537
Juggernaut: No Stopping Now	Juggernaut (vol. 3) #1-5	March 2021	978-1302924508

== See also ==
- "Nothing Can Stop the Juggernaut!"
