= Polaris (Marvel Comics) =

Fictional character from Marvel Comics

- Textless variant cover of X-Men (vol. 6) #6 (January 2022). Art by Russell Dauterman and Matthew Wilson.

Publication information
- Publisher: Marvel Comics
- First appearance: The X-Men #49 (October 1968)
- Created by: Arnold Drake; Jim Steranko

In-story information
- Alter ego: Dr. Lorna Sally Dane
- Species: Human mutant
- Team affiliations: Horsemen of Apocalypse; Starjammers; X-Factor; Acolytes; X-Men
- Notable aliases: Malice; Pestilence
- Abilities: Magnetic field manipulation granting: Electromagnetic spectrum manipulation and sight; Magnetic force fields, pulse, and flight; Organic iron manipulation; Energy absorption; Partial resistance to ionizing radiation; Fast elimination of toxins and drugs

Polaris (Dr. Lorna Sally Dane) is a character appearing in American comic books published by Marvel Comics. Created by writer Arnold Drake and artist Jim Steranko, the character first appeared in The X-Men #49 (October 1968), though she is not called Polaris until The X-Men #97 (February 1976). Dane has also been a member of the X-Men and the X-Factor, in which she is frequently paired with her on-again off-again romantic interest Havok (Alex Summers).

Like the other X-Men, Lorna Dane belongs to the subspecies of humans called mutants, who are born with superhuman abilities. She can control magnetism in a manner similar to her father, Magneto, who served as the X-Men's main antagonist in early stories (The X-Men #1-11, published 1963–1965). Although it was speculated for decades, the fact that Magneto was her father was not revealed until a 2003 storyline, some 35 years after the character's debut. Many of Lorna's stories involve her mental instability and mental health issues, particularly her bipolar disorder, which is exacerbated by the repeated brainwashing episodes and other traumatic events. Lorna's mental health has also been a factor in storylines where she becomes evil or loses control of her abilities. The character has been known as Polaris, Malice, and Pestilence at various points in her history.

The character has been featured in various other Marvel-licensed products, including video games, animated television series, and merchandise. Lorna Dane made her live-action debut in The Gifted (2018), portrayed by Emma Dumont.

== Publication history ==
Lorna Dane debuted in The X-Men #49 (October 1968), created by writer Arnold Drake and artist Jim Steranko. Her powers manifest in The X-Men #50, and in issue #60 she joins the X-Men. Drake and Steranko's successors on the series, Roy Thomas and Neal Adams, introduced a romance between Lorna and Havok.

Together with Havok, the character has a brief appearance in Hulk #150 (April 1972). Polaris and Havok later appeared briefly as captives of the Secret Empire before being freed by Captain America and the X-Men in a storyline that ran from Captain America #173 -175 (May-July 1974). She then appeared in the 1975 Giant-Size X-Men #1, but in the next appearance of the X-Men, The X-Men #94 (August 1975), she quits the team. She and Havok return in The X-Men #97 (February 1976) as villains under the mental control of Erik the Red, with Lorna calling herself Polaris for the first time. Polaris and Havok are returned to normal by The X-Men #119 (March 1979), and became regular members of the X-Men's supporting cast.

Polaris joins the relaunched X-Factor in X-Factor #71 (October 1991) and remains with the group until the end of the series, X-Factor #149 (September 1998).

Lorna Dane continued to appear in The X-Men, now retitled The Uncanny X-Men, as well as a new series simply titled X-Men (no "The"). In The Uncanny X-Men #431 (November 2003) a DNA test proves that she is the daughter of Magneto. She had previously been revealed to be of this parentage in The X-Men #50 (her second appearance), but most saw this as being invalidated by the revelation in The X-Men #58 (July 1979) that the Magneto who claimed to be her father was a robot. She rejoins X-Factor in X-Factor Investigations and the 2014 All-New X-Factor.

She then appeared in the 2019 Captain Marvel, the 2020 X-Factor series, the 2020 X of Swords: Creation one-shot, the 2021 X-Men series, the 2021 X-Men Unlimited Infinity Comic series, the 2022 Marauders series, the 2023 Scarlet Witch series, the 2024 Fall of the House of X series, and the 2024 X-Factor series.

The new costume worn by Polaris in the Fall of the House of X (2024) series was designed by comic book artist Lukas Werneck. Marvel Comics requested a suit paying homage to Magneto.

== Fictional character biography ==
=== Origin ===
Lorna Dane met the original team of X-Men while still a student. When the villain Mesmero used his "psyche-generator" to summon mutants in North America with latent powers, Lorna found herself compelled to travel to San Francisco, where Mesmero was. There she encountered the X-Man Iceman, who broke her trance by causing her to slip on a patch of ice and then convinced her to come to his apartment. At the apartment, Lorna met the rest of the X-Men who soon learned that she had latent mutant powers. Mesmero and his android Demi-Men captured her and took her to their desert headquarters, with the X-Men in pursuit. The psyche-generator awakened her mutant powers and Mesmero named her "Queen of the Mutants".

When the X-Men attempted to rescue her, Magneto revealed himself as the leader of the group behind her abduction—and, more importantly, claimed to be Lorna's father. Despite the X-Men's assertions that Magneto is evil, Lorna could not bring herself to fight her own father. Iceman returns from meeting with her foster parents who told him that her birth parents had died in a plane crash years earlier. This information caused Lorna to turn against Magneto but it was later revealed that she had caused the accident and Magneto had her memories of it erased with the help of Mastermind. For a while, Iceman was attracted to her, but Lorna did not truly reciprocate his feelings. She instead fell in love with their teammate Havok.

Unbeknownst to Lorna, the Magneto who claimed to be her father is revealed to be an android. Shortly after, Lorna was captured by Sentinels, but was rescued by the X-Men. Lorna joined the X-Men and began living at Xavier's mansion. Lorna aided Havok and the X-Men in repelling the alien Z'Nox's attempted invasion of Earth.

Lorna Dane's first "code name" was Magnetrix, but she quickly decided that she did not like this name. However, that did not keep Havok from continuing to use that name as a way to annoy and flirt with her. The two leave the X-Men to pursue their mutual interest in geophysics. They moved to the Diablo mountain range in California.

Lorna, with Havok, is later seen battling the Hulk. When the old and new X-Men fought the mutant island Krakoa, Lorna displayed the full potential of her powers for the first time by disrupting the Earth's magnetic field, which sent Krakoa into deep space. They then joined Moira MacTaggert at her facility for genetic research on Muir Island.

=== Mind controlled ===
Lorna received a new costume of Shi'ar design, when her mind came under the domination of the Shi'ar Intelligence agent Davan Shakari, also known as Erik the Red. It was Erik the Red who gave Lorna the codename Polaris, which she has continued to use ever since. At the time, Shakari served D'Ken, then emperor of the Shi'ar Galaxy. Shakari kidnapped Alex Summers and Lorna, and subjected them to a powerful form of mind control. He turned them against the X-Men in an attempt to assassinate Professor Charles Xavier. A massive battle ensued at Kennedy International Airport, with the duo battling the X-Men. Polaris was defeated by Storm, but Shakari managed to escape with both her and Havok. Xavier eventually freed both Polaris and Havok from Shakari's control.

Polaris and Havok remained inactive as members of the X-Men, though they did return from time to time to assist the team. With the X-Men, they battled Proteus on Muir Island. For the most part, Lorna and Alex remained in civilian life for a number of years, settling in New Mexico and completing their college degrees. They were forced to reluctantly help the X-Men in Arcade's Murderworld. Their new life was interrupted when the Marauders ambushed them around the time of the Mutant Massacre. Polaris' mind was overtaken by the psionic being known as Malice.

Under Malice's control, Lorna attacked the X-Men as leader of the Marauders. Shortly thereafter, the Malice entity found that it had become permanently bonded to Lorna's body. She led the Marauders against the X-Men during Inferno. After Mister Sinister was seemingly killed, Malice's hold over Lorna weakened. Temporarily regaining control of her own mind, Lorna was able to place a phone call to the X-Men in Australia for help, but they arrived too late. Lorna had been taken to be with her alleged half-sister Zaladane, a priestess for the Savage Land's Sun People. The X-Men arrived in time to witness Zaladane's getaway, though Havok managed to infiltrate her army in disguise while the X-Men followed. In the Savage Land, the X-Men found that Zaladane had amassed an army of Savage Land natives who were being mentally controlled for her by Worm, one of the Savage Land Mutates. Zaladane revealed that she is in fact Lorna's sister and, using the High Evolutionary's machinery, stripped Lorna of her magnetic powers, taking them as her own. In addition, the process managed to finally separate Lorna from Malice. Zaladane and her forces clashed with Ka-Zar and the X-Men. During the encounter, Lorna's secondary mutation activated: she grew in height, became invulnerable, and gained superhuman strength. Zaladane's army was released from Worm's control, and Lorna finally regained her freedom.

Having nowhere else to go, Lorna went to Moira MacTaggert's mutant research station on Muir Island. On her way there, her secondary mutation activated again, as evidenced by a sudden increase in height. At this time, she discovered that her new mutation also affects those around her, amplifying negative emotions such as anger and hate.

=== Muir Island ===
Upon examination, Dr. MacTaggert was at a loss to explain Lorna's new mutation, although she did confirm that the only way Zaladane could have taken her powers away was if she had been a biological sibling. Shortly after her arrival, Lorna joined the Muir Island X-Men team formed by Moira and former X-Man Banshee. This team defended Muir Island from the attacking Reavers, who were hunting for Wolverine.

Prior to this time, it had not been clear that Polaris was actually drawing strength from being a nexus for negative emotional energies. Polaris' status as a nexus, however, was perceived by the villainous Shadow King. The Shadow King used Polaris as a gateway to allow him access to the physical world from the astral plane, causing a worldwide increase in anger, hatred, and violence in the process. Polaris was freed of his influence with the help of X-Factor and the X-Men during the Muir Island Saga. Upon the defeat of the Shadow King, Polaris' magnetic powers return due to a combination of Zaladane's death a short time before and the neural-disruptive psionic blade of the X-Man Psylocke, leaving no trace of her increased size, strength, or emotion-control powers.

=== X-Factor ===
Polaris was then asked to join the newly formed X-Factor by Valerie Cooper, and, tired of hiding out on Muir Island, she accepted. Havok and Polaris were set as its leaders. Although joining X-Factor offered Polaris the chance to reunite with Havok, their relationship remained largely unresolved. Polaris was able to come to terms with her experiences with mind control thanks to psychiatrist Dr. Leonard Samson, helping her to develop her confidence. Polaris developed a strong belief in Xavier's dream while a member of X-Factor. Polaris became the government's secret weapon against a possible attack from Magneto, with the government hiring the mercenary Random to test her abilities. Malice later returned to bother her once more but Havok and Polaris, out of their love for each other, each tried to absorb her, preventing the other from being possessed. In the end, Malice perished at the hands of Mister Sinister.

Shortly thereafter, Havok was kidnapped by agents of the Dark Beast, who forged a note explaining that Havok needed to get away from Polaris. This devastated Polaris, causing her to feel abandoned and betrayed. X-Factor's atmosphere changed as the criminals Mystique and Sabretooth were forced by the government to join the group. Polaris began to question her place on the team after this, especially as most of her original teammates were no longer active. She discovered Havok's fate as he attacked X-Factor with the Dark Beast's agents, apparently under mind-control. After Havok was defeated, Polaris tried to reach out to him, only to be attacked and severely injured when she felt she could trust him. When Sabretooth betrayed and attacked the team, Polaris was severely injured.

After recovering from her injuries, and learning that Havok's "terrorist" activities had been a front for his true undercover work, Polaris forgave him, although she rejected him romantically. She also agreed to join Havok's new X-Factor team. However, during their first team meeting, she could only watch as Havok was seemingly killed in the explosion of a faulty time machine constructed by the mutant from the future, Greystone. Although Havok had left Polaris in charge of his team while trying to stop Greystone, she apparently did not feel like she could keep the team together, and they disbanded shortly thereafter.

=== The Twelve ===
Weeks later, Nightcrawler encountered Lorna in a church and she confided in him that she felt she was being followed and that she was sure Alex was still alive. A group of Skrulls working with Apocalypse were indeed shadowing her and broke into her apartment to retrieve the headgear from Havok's original costume. Lorna then learned that she was one of The Twelve, a team of mutants supposedly destined to usher in a new golden age for mutant-kind. Polaris journeyed with the X-Men to Egypt to battle Apocalypse. During the encounter, Magneto, another member of The Twelve, discovered that he could use Lorna to tap into the Earth's magnetic field with incredible force, effectively hiding the reduced state of his powers at the time.

=== Acolyte ===
After Apocalypse was defeated, Polaris returned to Genosha with Magneto to supply him with power and help him keep order. She believed she was doing it for the greater good, but also enjoyed the education in her powers that she received. Magneto launched a full-scale assault on Carrion Cove, the last city opposing his rule, to gain access to technology that would restore his full abilities. Polaris attempted to stop him, but she was defeated and left the country with the Avengers. She later returned with Quicksilver to help oppose Magneto's tyrannical rule.

Although Quicksilver was discovered and forced to leave Genosha, Polaris maintained a low profile to covertly transport refugees from the war to other nations, as well as monitor Magneto's actions. After Magneto's spine was severed by Wolverine, Polaris was able to steal a blood sample from his medical tests, which she used to confirm that Magneto was her biological father. When Cassandra Nova's Sentinels destroyed Genosha and massacred millions, Polaris was one of the few survivors. She was left emotionally scarred after witnessing the massacre after being unable to save them.

=== Trauma ===
Later, some of the X-Men went to Genosha to survey what occurred there. They encountered a nude and deranged Polaris in Genosha after its population was massacred by Cassandra Nova's Sentinels. When Polaris rejoined the X-Men, the experience had left her with a darker, more ruthless personality, even killing some members of the anti-mutant Church of Humanity. Havok broke up with Polaris after they were about to be married, leaving her at the altar for nurse Annie Ghazikhanian with whom he had an affair while he was in a coma using telepathy. Polaris now driven to instability yet again went berserk and commenced to go on a rampage that nearly resulted in her killing Havok. A case was made that it was due to the trauma from Genosha but nobody bought it. Juggernaut succeeded in knocking her out. She remained this way until some psychic therapy with Professor Xavier. Polaris promised to do no more harm and she was accepted back to the X-Men.

Iceman later admitted to Polaris that he still had feelings for her and after some mild flirtation, the two began a relationship. The relationship was not to last, however, since Lorna's other relationships (namely with Havok) were still unresolved. Havok has confessed to still loving her after Annie had left him, however, Polaris pushed him away.

=== Decimation ===
It was revealed that Polaris had lost her powers on M-Day, but had avoided telling her teammates. When confronted by Valerie Cooper, who has knowledge of her power loss, Polaris claimed that her power loss is psychological and she believes she is preventing herself from using them. Polaris eventually was forced by circumstance to accept that her powers were gone and admit the fact to the rest of the team—whereupon all the other members of her squad, except her would-be-paramours Iceman and Havok, revealed to her that they had already guessed it. She then left the mansion with Havok to "search" for her lost powers, irrationally convinced they lay with an alien named Daap, a seeming twin to the deceased X-Statix member Doop, who she had seen on a recent mission in space. Daap soon crashed to Earth and kidnapped Polaris and the Leper Queen, the leader of the anti-mutant group known as the Sapien League.

=== Horseman of Apocalypse ===
Apocalypse took them both, restrained the Leper Queen, and forcibly transformed Polaris into the new Pestilence. Seemingly mind-wiped, she ingested viruses from the World Health Organization and was attempting to create a meta-plague. In the battle between the X-Men, the Avengers, and Apocalypse, Wolverine discovered Pestilence was Lorna. She was recovering in the X-Mansion when former Horsemen of Apocalypse Gambit and Sunfire returned to take her away. She arose and refused to go with them, but also decided to quit the X-Men. Polaris decided to leave that night to search for Apocalypse in Egypt. She went alone and was later hunted until Havok and the new Uncanny X-Men team saved her. Emma Frost has also noted that her powers seem to be "strange and mutating".

=== The Rise and Fall of The Shi'ar Empire ===
After being rescued from an anti-Apocalypse cult by the new team, Polaris agreed to join Professor X, Darwin, Havok, Marvel Girl, Nightcrawler, and Warpath on their mission to stop Vulcan. Her current relationship with Havok is still developing. Polaris seemed to finally show concrete signs of forgiving Havok, telling him to "just shut up and kiss me" after the team won their first battle against the entire regiment of Shi'ar soldiers in their beginning struggle against D'Ken and in support of Lilandra. Although Havok initially rebuffs her advances, hesitant to "start up again after" everything that happened between them, Lorna says that he needs to "blow off some steam" and the scene ends with them kissing. Polaris helps in the big fight and seriously hurts Vulcan and Gladiator with her powers, but in the end she is one of the X-Men left behind.

=== Starjammers ===
Following the death of Corsair at the hands of Vulcan, Polaris joined the newest incarnation of the Starjammers, intending to kill Vulcan and restore Lilandra Neramani to the Shi'ar throne. Their mission proved unsuccessful and Polaris, along with Havok, Ch'od, and Raza, was captured and incarcerated on an underwater planet by Vulcan. Polaris is later freed by Havok and the other Starjammers, who vow to kill Vulcan.

=== War of Kings ===
Polaris and the Starjammers played a large role in the "War of Kings" storyline, which also featured Vulcan, the Inhumans, Nova, and the Guardians of the Galaxy. Pursued by a Shi'ar superdestroyer after escaping, Lorna uses the fact that she is Crystal's sister-in-law to allow the Starjammers through the Kree's defensive shield. After the Shi'ar Imperial Guard's attack on Crystal and Ronan's wedding, Lorna plays a minor but pivotal role in regaining Kree popular support for the Inhumans by making sure that Crystal's humanitarian acts towards the injured Kree civilians are broadcast all over the Kree networks. After this, she once again joins the Starjammers on their mission to rescue Lilandra. They promptly commandeer a Shi'ar Ironclad (which she helps capture by magnetizing the Starjammer to its hull) which they then use to join the main Shi'ar fleet until their cover is blown when they rescue Rocket Raccoon and the Guardians of the Galaxy.

=== X-Men Legacy ===
Magneto, Rogue, Frenzy, and Gambit respond to Rachel Summers's distress call and Rogue uses Legion's powers to teleport to the space station they are on. Lorna, Korvus and Alex are mind controlled by an alien force and are being used to help torture and kill Shi'ar. When she meets up with Magneto their reunion is short lived as the Shi'ar attack the assembled group and Lorna, Alex and Korvus attack Magneto, Frenzy, and Gambit. Rachel's actions break them free of the mind control and the X-Men join forces. Polaris says she has many things she wanted to ask Magneto and he responds by saying at another time when they are out of danger. The team works together to build a black hole that takes the space station and all aboard back to Earth ending Lorna's space arc.

=== Regenesis ===
Polaris along with Havok are seen joining Wolverine's side after Wolverine suggests that they go out on their own away from their family and join X-Factor.

=== Return to X-Factor ===
During the Breaking Points storyline, Longshot used his psychometry to read a photograph of Lorna's mother and nominal father from which Longshot learned the truth about their death. Lorna forced Longshot to show her what he had seen, using M's telepathic powers to make a connection. Lorna was devastated to learn that the first outbreak of her powers led to their death in a plane crash. Magneto had Mastermind manipulate her memories to repress her involvement in her parents' death. Later, Polaris and Havok have broken up, due to Havok agreeing to lead the Uncanny Avengers, and Polaris wanting to remain with X-Factor.

=== All New X-Factor ===
Polaris is now the leader of X-Factor, a corporate team that protects the interest of the company Serval. It is revealed that Harrison secretly had nanos put in her right eye, without her consent. Her half brother Quicksilver is on the team and is secretly spying on her for her ex Havok.

=== Secret Wars (2015) ===
During the Secret Wars storyline, Polaris assisted Magneto during the incursion between Earth-616 and Earth-1610. As the energies of the two universes inch closer to impact cascade and send chaos through the streets, Magneto and Polaris are taking the fight to this "other" Earth, battling the parallel Sentinels sent after them. Polaris is shocked to see the energy levels her father is exhibiting, all the while trying to protect the people caught in the crossfire of Magneto and the Sentinels.

=== Secret Empire ===
During the Secret Empire storyline, Polaris breaks in on a prison in New Tian when Havok is about to attack the time-displaced Jean Grey and Jimmy Hudson. While Jean and Jimmy look for their teammates, Polaris manages to defeat Havok and helps the young mutants to escape. Upon escaping, Polaris and Danger reveal to the team that Magneto assigned them to look after them, which they've done secretly.

=== Dawn of X ===
In the new status quo for mutants post House of X and Powers of X, Professor X and Magneto invite all mutants to live on Krakoa and welcome even former enemies into their fold. Polaris is seen with Magneto as he explains the process of resurrection for mutants involving the combined powers of The Five (Hope Summers, Egg, Proteus, Tempus, and Elixir).

Polaris is seen attacking the last compound of Orchis on Earth with Magneto, Storm, and Cyclops. Later, she joins Rachel Summers, Daken, Northstar and former X-students Eye-Boy and Prodigy in a new initiative in Krakoa: they are to investigate any mutant death and prepare a report for The Five as part of the Resurrection Protocols of Krakoa. Their first case involves the supposed death of Northstar's twin sister, Aurora. Following the conclusion of the X-Factor title, Polaris was elected during the Hellfire Gala to become a new member of the main X-Men team.

== Powers and abilities ==
Lorna Dane possesses the ability to control magnetism. She regained her magnetic powers after M-day by celestial technology that reactivated her X-gene. She can manipulate metals which are susceptible to magnetism. She has the power to manipulate the iron in a body to reverse the blood flow. Polaris is able to generate magnetic energy pulses. She can create magnetic force-fields. She has the power to manipulate magnetic fields. Polaris can use her abilities to allow herself to fly. She is able to perceive the world around her solely as patterns of magnetic and electrical energy. She has the ability to perceive the natural magnetic auras surrounding living beings as well. Polaris can also absorb energy.

Polaris had shown the ability to ingest virulent diseases without harm, absorbing their traits, and according to Apocalypse is able to spread a "meta-plague" that will kill anyone who has not been inoculated with the virus' vaccine, the Blood of Apocalypse. She had also been shown to fight off toxins and drugs quicker than normal.

Additionally, Lorna Dane possesses expertise in geophysics, and has earned a doctorate in that field.

== Reception ==
=== Critical response ===
Alex Schlesinger of Screen Rant described Polaris as one of the "X-Men's most iconic mutants" and as an "iconic hero." Deirdre Kaye of Scary Mommy called Polaris a "role model" and a "truly heroic" female character. Maite Molina of ComicsVerse noted the popularity of Polaris among comic book fans, saying, "She does not believe there is a point in one's heroic journey where you have to establish yourself. Polaris has fought against the tension of her agency. She has lived a history where much was taken from her. Ultimately, she has endured. So, despite the seemingly insurmountable obstacles and countless foes, Lorna has never faltered in her steadfast role as a member of the X-Men. This is why she is so beloved." Lukas Shayo of Comic Book Resources called Polaris one of the best female X-Men characters, writing, "Lorna Dane is a force to be reckoned with in the field, and she is remarkably creative with her powers."

Commenting specifically on the popularity of Polaris's relationship with Havok, Matt Merante wrote, "Readers often connect to these characters as they relate to their mercurial relationship and resistance to familial expectations. The visual appeal of Polaris's green mane and Havok's distinct costume combined with the extreme potency of their powers make them interesting on a visceral level, but ultimately, it's their emotional connection that has endured in the annals of comic book history. For them, love is a choice made even in times of great strife."

=== Impact ===
Polaris was the winner of a popularity contest held by Marvel Comics in 2021, which served to determine who would be the final member of a new X-Men team that would debut during the Hellfire Gala storyline.

== Other versions ==
=== Age of Apocalypse ===
An alternate version of Polaris appears in the Age of Apocalypse reality. She was one of the many prisoners in Sinister's Breeding Pens, and a victim of the Dark Beast's tests. She had been rendered nearly powerless because Rogue had absorbed her abilities and permanently retained half of her powers when the two had a fallout prior to Rogue being taken to the X-Men. Prelate Scott Summers frees her, but she cannot recognize him; she mistakes him for Magneto, whom she believes is her father.

=== House of M ===
An alternate version of Polaris appears in the "House of M" storyline. Magneto becomes romantically involved with Susanna Dane an American exchange student in Europe who is helping smuggle him from place to place. When Magneto finds out she is having a child he tells her to go home because what she is doing is likely to get her and her child killed. Lorna Dane grows up in California and watches Magneto declare war on the human governments as a child. Eventually Magneto reveals he is her father when he becomes ruler of Genosha. Polaris is shocked and storms off due to him never having been there for her. She eventually comes around as she is seen later when the new world order began, where mutants were the ruling class and with Magneto being their monarch. Lorna is still residing with him in his palace on Genosha with all his children. Polaris, Quicksilver and the Scarlet Witch were considered royalty in this reality, and Lorna eventually develops a close relationship with her father.

=== Mutant X ===
An alternate version of Polaris appears in Mutant X. She works as a long-term member of the X-Men, after Magneto takes over from an ill Professor Xavier. This Polaris knows she is the daughter of Magneto. The X-Men briefly fight and lose against an insane Madelyne Pryor. Later, they seemingly perish in an atomic explosion but survive this as well. Polaris is one of the victims in the reality-threatening battle involving Pryor and the Beyonder. Badly injured, she dies in her father's arms, reassured that everything will be okay.

=== Ultimate Marvel ===
An alternate version of Polaris appears in the Ultimate Marvel continuity of Ultimate X-Men. This version is a member of the Academy of Tomorrow, a mutant peacekeeping squad led by Emma Frost. In this continuity, she is also the girlfriend of Havok but as a twist, she was also the ex-girlfriend of his brother Cyclops, whom Havok resents with a passion.

Polaris is framed for killing dozens of people with her powers during a rescue mission, and imprisoned in the Triskelion of the Ultimates with mutant terrorist Magneto. After beating him at chess after only 12 or so games, Magneto beats her into unconsciousness with a chair, and then uses her to goad Havok into rescuing her, so that he can escape the maximum-security cell by swapping places with Mystique. In the end, Polaris' name is cleared and she returns to the Academy of Tomorrow. She was killed in "Ultimatum" along with the rest of the Academy of Tomorrow except for Havok.

=== Exiles ===
An alternate version of Polaris is drafted onto the interdimensional superhero team the Exiles. Originating from Earth-8149, she is seemingly killed in battle with a group of Sentinels engineered to destroy her, but is plucked out of time moments before her death to join the Exiles. Polaris later learns that her universe's version of Magneto eventually reformed following her death.

== In other media ==
=== Television ===
- Polaris appears in X-Men: The Animated Series, voiced by Mary Long. This version is a former member of the X-Men who left the group with Iceman to pursue a normal life. However, they later separated, with Polaris going on to join X-Factor and enter a relationship with Havok.
  - Polaris appears in the second season of X-Men '97, voiced by Carolina Ravassa.
- Polaris appears in Wolverine and the X-Men, voiced by Liza del Mundo. This version is the sheltered daughter of Magneto who is forbidden from leaving Genosha. Additionally, a possible future version from a Sentinel-controlled timeline appears as well.
- Polaris appears in The Gifted, portrayed by Emma Dumont. This version is a co-founder of the Mutant Underground who later has a daughter named Dawn with her boyfriend Eclipse and temporarily defects to the Hellfire Club.

=== Video games ===
- Polaris appears in Magneto's ending in Ultimate Marvel vs. Capcom 3.
- Polaris appears as a playable character in Lego Marvel Super Heroes, voiced by Tara Strong.
- Polaris appears as a playable character in Marvel Puzzle Quest.
- Polaris appears as a playable character in Marvel Future Fight.
- Polaris appears as a playable character in Uncanny X-Men: Days of Future Past.
- Polaris appears as a playable character in Marvel Strike Force.
- Polaris appears as a playable character in Marvel Super War.
- Polaris appears as a playable character in Marvel Snap.
- Polaris appears as an accessory in Marvel Rivals.

=== Merchandise ===
- In 2022, HeroClix released a Polaris figure as part of the Hellfire Gala Premium Set.
- Marvel Legends has released two figures of Polaris. The first appeared in the 2017 Warlock BAF wave in her 2006 uniform, followed by the 2019 80th Anniversary Box Set of X-Factor, alongside Havok, in their original 1986 X-Factor uniforms.
