= Havok (character) =

Marvel Comics superhero

- Havok on the cover of Astonishing X-Men (vol. 4) #17 (November 2018). Art by Greg Land.

Publication information
- Publisher: Marvel Comics
- First appearance: The X-Men #54 (March 1969)
- Created by: Arnold Drake (writer); Don Heck (artist)

In-story information
- Alter ego: Alexander "Alex" Summers
- Species: Human mutant
- Place of origin: Honolulu, Hawaii
- Team affiliations: X-Men; Avengers; Avengers Unity Squad; X-Factor Investigations; Starjammers; X-Factor; Six; Genoshan Magistrates; Defenders for a Day; Brotherhood of Mutants; Dark Descendants; Hellions
- Notable aliases: Mutant X, Magistrate Summers, Goblin Prince
- Abilities: Cosmic energy absorption; Plasma beam generation

Havok is a fictional character appearing in American comic books published by Marvel Comics, commonly in association with the X-Men. He first appears in The X-Men #54 (March 1969), and was created by writer Arnold Drake and penciller Don Heck. Havok generates powerful "plasma blasts", an ability he has had difficulty controlling.

One of the sons of Corsair, Alexander "Alex" Summers is the younger brother of the X-Men's Cyclops, and the older brother of Vulcan and the older half brother of Adam X. He often resents Cyclops's authoritarian attitude and reputation as a model member of the X-Men. In contrast, Havok and his longtime love interest Polaris have had a love-hate relationship with the team, often finding themselves roped into it. Both were also members of the 1990s-era Pentagon-sponsored mutant team X-Factor. After X-Factor disbanded, Havok starred in Mutant X, a series in which he explored a strange alternate reality. He has since returned to the X-Men, later taking over his father's role as leader of the Starjammers to bring Vulcan's reign over the Shi'ar to an end.

Havok has appeared in other media, including TV series, films, and videogames. Lucas Till played Havok in the films X-Men: First Class (2011), X-Men: Days of Future Past (2014), and X-Men: Apocalypse (2016).

== Publication history ==
Havok was created by writer Arnold Drake and artist Don Heck, making his first appearance in X-Men #54 (March 1969). The issue introduces the character as Alex Summers, the younger brother of Scott Summers (Cyclops) and, later in the series, the older brother of Gabriel Summers (Vulcan). Initially, the character is unaware of his "mutant" status as his X-gene lies dormant upon his first appearance in the X-Men series.

During Roy Thomas and Neal Adams's run on The X-Men, Alex's character is revealed to be a mutant who eventually takes on the codename "Havok." His powers first manifested when he accidentally incinerates his foster sister Haley's kidnapper using uncontrolled plasma blasts. To manage his volatile abilities, he relies on a specialized containment suit that monitors and absorbs his excess energy.

According to Thomas, Drake never told him whether he intended Alex to be a mutant or not.

Throughout the series, Alex continued to struggle under the shadow of his brother Scott, whom he believed to be his father's favorite. Adams designed Havok's original costume, which first appears in The X-Men #58 (July 1969), devising it as not simply a more striking visual for the character but a practical energy-siphoning suit. Thomas and Adams also introduced a romance between Havok and Polaris (then known only by her real name, Lorna Dane). Havok joins the X-Men in issue #65 (December 1969).

Havok's initial stint in The X-Men was short-lived. After just one more issue, the title ceased publishing new stories and began reprinting earlier issues. He appeared in the 1975 Giant-Size X-Men #1, which reintroduced the team with seven new members, but in the X-Men's next appearance, The X-Men #94 (May 1975), he quits the group. He and Polaris return in The X-Men #97 (February 1976) as villains under the mental control of Erik the Red. They are returned to normal by The X-Men #119 (March 1979), and became regular members of the X-Men's supporting cast.

Havok joins the relaunched X-Factor in X-Factor #71 (October 1991) and remains with the group until the end of the series, X-Factor #149 (September 1998). Upon the conclusion of X-Factor, Havok was given his own starring series, Mutant X, which ran for 32 issues.

In the 2012 relaunch of Marvel comic books, Havok led a team called the Uncanny Avengers, a mix of the X-Men and the Avengers teams.

During the X-Men: From the Ashes relaunch, Havok is the leader of X-Factor in X-Factor (Vol. 5).

== Fictional character biography ==
=== Origins ===
Alexander Summers was born in Honolulu, Hawaii. He is the second of the three known sons of Christopher Summers, a United States Air Force Major and test pilot, and his wife Katherine Anne. While growing up in Anchorage, Alaska, his father took the family for a flight in their airplane, which came under attack by a Shi'ar spaceship. As the plane was crashing, his parents fastened Alex and his older brother Scott into a parachute and pushed them off the plane in hopes that they would survive. His brother hit his head and was in a coma for a short while.

The Summers boys were recovered and put into an orphanage and Alex was soon adopted whereas Scott remained there for much of his childhood. Alex was raised by the Blandings whose son Todd had died in a car accident. When the boy responsible for Todd's death kidnapped Alex and his foster sister, Haley, Alex manifested his powers for the first time, incinerating the boy. Mister Sinister, an evil geneticist who was obsessed with the Summers bloodline, appeared eager yet surprised that Alex's potential exceeded Scott's – despite the fact that he seemed to lack control over his gift. Sinister placed psi-blocks on both Alex and Haley's minds, causing them to forget what had happened that night.

=== First encounter with X-Men ===
Alex went on to study and earn a degree in geophysics at college. There he first met the original X-Men and learned that Cyclops is his brother. His mutant powers became apparent when he was kidnapped by the Living Pharaoh who declared Alex the only being able to rival his power. The two shared the same cosmic energy-absorption abilities, in adverse proportion to each other. By locking Alex in a shielded cell, the Pharaoh was able to absorb enough cosmic energy to become the Living Monolith. The X-Men fought a losing battle against the virtually unstoppable Monolith until Alex managed to free himself, and the Monolith turned back into the Living Pharaoh.

Alex's mutant power at first seemed to manifest itself only when he was near death. He was unable to control it and feared its immense power.

Alex was later captured by Larry Trask and his Sentinels who were bent on controlling or eradicating all mutants. Trask fashioned a costume that would help Alex control his powers and he was given the code name Havok. Trask turned out to be a mutant himself and the Sentinels were defeated by the X-Men. Havok lost control of his powers and his excess energy was absorbed by Sauron. Havok then gained control of his powers.

Havok actively joined the X-Men team and began a relationship with Lorna Dane/Polaris, much to the anger of Iceman who was romantically interested in her as well. While the senior X-Men were in the Savage Land, Havok and Polaris were approached by Professor X about the imminent invasion of the alien Z'Nox. During this time, the couple fell in love.

With the original X-Men, Havok and Polaris were captured by Krakoa the living island but eventually rescued by the new X-Men. Havok and Polaris quit the team's active membership along with most of the original members.

Havok was again captured by the Living Pharaoh, this time rescued by Spider-Man and Thor.

Havok and Polaris were occasional members and allies of the X-Men for years. They alternated between doing graduate work and earning a postgraduate degree in the American Southwest – where they occasionally encountered the Hulk – and helping out Moira MacTaggert at her facility for genetic research on Muir Island, off the coast of Scotland. It was during their stay on Muir Island that Havok helped the X-Men battle Proteus.

Eventually, Alex learned that Corsair of the Starjammers was really his father.

During one of their adventures, Polaris was possessed by the mutant Marauder Malice, ending the romantic relationship for a time. Havok then sought out and rejoined the X-Men.

=== Fall of the Mutants and Madelyne Pryor ===
During the X-Men's battle with the Adversary in Dallas, they sacrificed themselves to defeat it and were resurrected by Roma in the Australian Outback. During this period, Havok became involved with Madelyne Pryor. Both of them had been rejected by their previous lovers: Pryor's then-husband Cyclops had left her for Jean Grey. Madelyne was manipulated by N'astirh and became the Goblin Queen. She attempted to use Havok to help take over the world and transform it into a demonic realm. Havok eventually came to his senses and Madelyne killed herself after discovering she was a clone of Jean Grey.

While vacationing in Mexico with Wolverine, they were targeted by a terrorist cell that aimed to use Havok's powers to absorb harmful radiation from a nuclear fallout.

=== Genosha ===
Havok ultimately went through the Siege Perilous with several other X-Men fleeing the Reavers. Havok ended up an amnesiac in Genosha, a country that enslaved mutants, where became a high-ranking Magistrate in their army. His fellow X-Men discovered his fate during the X-Tinction Agenda, when the Genoshan government kidnapped members of the mutant teams X-Men, X-Factor and the New Mutants. During a pitched battle with Cyclops, Havok's memory returned, but he kept it a secret hoping to catch the Genoshan leader, Cameron Hodge, off guard. He succeeded and delivered the killing blow to Hodge, yet he and Wolfsbane decided to remain in Genosha, as they wanted to help in rebuilding the once proud nation.

=== X-Factor ===
Havok and Wolfsbane were soon brought back from Genosha by Professor X and Cyclops as they wanted him to become the leader of the new government-sponsored X-Factor. He reunited with Polaris and Havok led the team effectively for quite some time. He dealt with the unwilling, unwitting affections of Wolfsbane, the physical problems of Strong Guy, and various public relations disasters, such as the destruction of the Washington Monument. Much of the team's bad image was orchestrated by Mister Sinister, his Nasty Boys, and a mutant senator who could cause bad luck.

During this time, X-Factor participated in the events of the Infinity War and the Infinity Crusade.

Multiple Man contracted the Legacy Virus in Genosha and died. This hit Havok hard, who left the team for Hawaii, where he and Polaris enjoyed a romantic honeymoon until Malice, Mister Sinister, and the Nasty Boys attacked. Reinforcements helped defeat the villains. Shortly afterward, Strong Guy suffered a heart attack and ended up in a coma, and Wolfsbane left to be with her foster mother.

After the Age of Apocalypse event, Havok accidentally destroyed a dam and was forced back into his old containment suit. After new members Wild Child, Shard and Mystique were introduced to the team, Havok fought Random and was captured by the Dark Beast. He was brainwashed into serving Dark Beast and Onslaught. He broke free of the brainwashing, but used it as an opportunity to infiltrate the enemy and recreated a version of the Brotherhood of Mutants. He succeeded in defeating Dark Beast and attempted to mend relationships with his former X-Factor teammates, specifically Polaris and Multiple Man (the man who had died had been a Madrox duplicate).

While Havok was attempting to reform X-Factor, one of his time-traveling team members, Greystone, created an experimental time travel device to return him to the future. It exploded in mid-air, seemingly killing Havok and Greystone in front of their teammates.

=== Mutant X ===
Mutant X

In actuality, Havok was cast into a parallel world where he was the leader of a drastically altered version of X-Factor, known as The Six. In this world, he was the leader of the original X-Men, since his brother Cyclops was abducted by the Shi'ar along with his parents. He found he was married to Madelyne Pryor, with whom he had a son named Scotty, and all his friends were twisted versions of the ones he knew. Despite being unfamiliar with this realm, Havok willingly took over the role of father for Scotty, though the boy knew he was not really his dad. Havok becomes leader of The Six and his adventures in this reality lead to a disaster which leaves most of the superhumans dead. Havok is able to save the world itself before being cast into black nothingness.

=== Return to Earth-616 ===
Havok is found back in his original reality in a coma. The X-Men restore his psyche with the help of the son of Havok's nurse, Annie Ghazikhanian. When he was reunites with Polaris, she asks him to marry her, to which he did not respond as he felt he did not love her anymore. Unknown to the others, Annie's son Carter had used his telepathy to link Annie and Alex's dreams while Alex was comatose, causing them to fall in love. During the wedding, Alex stops the proceedings and calls off the marriage. Lorna, already affected by the incident at Genosha, tries to kill Annie and Carter, only to be stopped by Juggernaut and Havok.

Alex revealed to Annie that it was Carter who linked the two due to their loneliness and that Alex loved her. Despite the fact that Iceman had started a relationship with Annie, he expressed his feelings for Lorna.

Havok and Annie's relationship continued until on the X-Mansion by Exodus and his Brotherhood of Mutants, caused Annie to leave with Carter, feeling it was no longer safe for the two at the mansion. She wanted Alex to come with them but his duty was to his team.

=== Decimation ===
During the post-"House of M" storyline titled "Decimation," many mutants lost their powers. When Polaris revealed that she had lost her powers, she left the X-Men, and Havok decided to leave with her. However Lorna was abducted and Havok saw the face of Apocalypse at the mansion on return.

Havok joined a team of Rogue, Iceman, and Mystique to take down Apocalypse, with Havok single-handedly destroying the antidote to Apocalypse's meta-plague, which had been a key element in his plan to decimate the human population. During the last battle against the Horsemen of Apocalypse, Iceman struck down Lorna's Pestilence form. Havok administered CPR to save her life but was infected with the meta-plague. Luckily, Emma Frost had saved some of the antidote and cured him with it.

=== The rise and fall of the Shi'ar Empire ===
Havok was recruited by Professor X, along with Marvel Girl (Rachel Summers), Nightcrawler, Warpath, Darwin, and Polaris to participate in a space mission to stop Vulcan from unleashing his powers on the Shi'ar empire. Havok had recently been reunited with Corsair and his relationship with Polaris began to improve. During the final battle, Corsair tries to reason with his son Vulcan but Vulcan kills him. Havok is enraged and launches an attack on his brother but is easily defeated. In the end, Nightcrawler, Warpath, and Hepzibah get the injured Professor X and Darwin back to the ship, but Lilandra sends the ship back to Earth, leaving Havok and his teammates stranded.

Havok, along with Polaris, Rachel, Korvus, Ch'od, and Raza form a new team of Starjammers after the death of Corsair, dedicated to defeating Vulcan and restoring Lilandra to the throne.

=== Starjammers ===
The civil war between Vulcan's forces and those loyal to the dethroned Lilandra rages on. Led by Havok and the Starjammers, Lilandra's forces gradually whittle away at Vulcan's forces, which are plagued by defections. The Shi'ar, contrary to Vulcan's expectations, are not happy to have an outsider as their ruler. Vulcan is discouraged by this, but Deathbird convinces him that they will come to accept him.

Vulcan and his fleet ambush the Starjammers. The Scy'ar Tal arrive, easily defeat Vulcan's forces and cause them to retreat. Marvel Girl makes contact with the Eldest Scy'ar Tal and discovers their true origin, as the M'Kraan, a race massacred and displaced by the Shi'ar, who took the M'Kraan Crystal as their own, and passed down the legend of the M'Kraan Crystal as a sacred gift from their deities. After the Scy'ar Tal destroy Feather's Edge with Finality, a weapon capable of teleporting stars, Vulcan makes contact with the Starjammers to call a temporary ceasefire.

Under the ceasefire, the Shi'ar and the Starjammers decide to take out the Finality together, thus crippling the Scy'ar's biggest threat. The Eldest Scy'ar tries to stop Vulcan and Havok, but Vulcan depowers him.The tide of the battle shifts to the Shi'ar, who then proceed to attack both the Scy'ar and the Starjammers. Meanwhile, Vulcan blasts Havok into a sun.

Vulcan decides to use Finality to destroy the Scy'ar. Alex returns and uses the powers absorbed from the sun against Vulcan. The Shi'ar Imperial Guard end Alex's battle with Vulcan by appearing with the Starjammers in captivity, threatening to kill them. Before surrendering, Alex destroys Finality. Alex and the Starjammers are then taken into Vulcan's custody and placed in prison, while Rachel Summers remains free.

Alex and the other captured Starjammers are kept in a deep underwater prison 20 miles (32 km) below a planet's surface. They are tortured daily and Havok is powerless due to the lack of sunlight. Havok escapes his cell with some leftover power, and frees his teammates, preparing for Vulcan's arrival to attempt to kill him.

=== Return and Schism ===
Havok, Polaris, Rachel and Korvus depart for Earth. Havok, Polaris, and Rachel return in X-Men Legacy #254, in which Rogue launches a rescue mission after Rachel sends a telepathic distress signal.

Havok and Polaris join Wolverine's side during "Schism" to Polaris wanting to keep herself away from her father Magneto. Shortly after they arrived back on Earth, the duo is encouraged by Wolverine to lead X-Factor Investigations after Jamie Madrox's death. Jamie returns to life shortly after, but Havok remains with X-Factor for a while. Polaris decides to remain with the team even after he leaves.

=== Uncanny Avengers ===
During Avengers vs. X-Men, Havok joined the Avengers, the X-Men, and Nova in the final battle against Cyclops. He is asked to lead the Avengers Unity Squad by Captain America, reasoning that the mutant race needs a new 'spokesperson' with Xavier dead and Cyclops imprisoned, although Havok doubts his ability to fulfill such a role.

The Celestials destroyed Earth and mutants were relocated to 'Planet X' by the machinations of Eimin. Havok married the Wasp (Janet van Dyne) and they had a daughter, Katie, but Katie is lost when she is captured by Kang the Conqueror after he helps the team avert this timeline by projecting their minds back into their past selves. Although Alex is left disfigured after the battle, he and Janet remain together, and are contacted by Immortus, who informs them that he can return their daughter to them if they take action at the right time and place to conceive her, but also warns them about the imminent threat posed by the Red Skull.

During the AXIS storyline, the Red Skull and Scarlet Witch accidentally morally invert various heroes and villains. Havok is among those affected by the inversion spell. He resigns from the Avengers Unity Division and reconciles with his brother. Havok remains corrupted after the other heroes and villains are returned to normal, where Havok and Sabretooth have been unintentionally 'protected' from the reversion by a shield generated by Iron Man, prompting him to join Cyclops' team after using the Wasp as a hostage to escape.

=== All-New, All-Different Marvel ===
Havok and Emma Frost are later seen observing the funeral of his brother Scott from afar. Emma tells him the truth about Cyclops's death and the final battle with Inhumans. Emma takes Alex to see Scott's dead body and reveals that Scott was one of the victims of the Terrigen Mist clouds.

After the truth of Emma's actions is revealed at the conclusion of the war against the Inhumans, which ended with Medusa destroying the Terrigen cloud to save the mutants, Havok saves Emma when the mutants and the Inhumans turn on her. Havok makes it clear that he is only doing this out of respect for his brother's memory and his old feelings for Emma rather than forgiving her for what she did to Cyclops' reputation. Havok was eventually inverted back to his normal self by Emma Frost and Polaris, and Elixir soon afterward cured his scars.

=== Dawn of X ===
In the new status quo for mutants post-House of X and Powers of X, Professor X and Magneto invite all mutants to live on Krakoa. He spends some time with his family in the Summer House, the new residence of the Summers family, located on the Moon.

Later, he joins a loose group of outcast mutants, operating under Mister Sinister: the Hellions, which also comprise Wild Child, Kwannon, Empath, John Greycrow, and Nanny and Orphan-Maker.

=== Fall of X and Post-Krakoa ===
During the Fall of X, Havok is fatally wounded by Albert. He is saved by Madelyne Pryor, who he was currently in a relationship. Pryor purposely kept Alex as an undead creature, but he demanded to be returned to life and, after she obliged, he left her.

During the X-Men: From the Ashes relaunch, Havok becomes the leader of the new government sponsored X-Factor team.

== Powers and abilities ==
Havok is a mutant possessing the power to absorb ambient cosmic energy, process it, and emanate it from his body as waves of energy that heat the air in their path, turning it into plasma in the form of a beam with a tell-tale concentric circle pattern. These waves will emanate from his body in all directions unless he purposefully channels them in a single direction, usually along the length of his arms. He is immune to the adverse effects of most forms of radiation and heat. In the past, he was not entirely able to control this ability, which made him a danger to those around him unless he wore a special containment suit equipped with special sensors for measuring and controlling his power output.

Despite past accounts, the energy that Havok releases is not truly a concussive force. When Havok strikes an object with hot plasma, the sudden temperature jump often causes objects to shatter or disintegrate. Should Havok direct his energy at the lowest level, he can project it toward a human being and his target will suffer a severe headache but will not burn up.

While his absorption capabilities are normally passive, he can also willingly absorb, store, and re-process various other energies from other sources through conscious force of will (such as starlight, x-rays, and gamma radiation).

Nonetheless, Havok's body is constantly absorbing cosmic radiation. When his body reaches its capacity, excess energy is then immediately re-emitted in negligible quantities. The circle on his chest is an indicator of how much energy he has left. Upon the expenditure of all his available energy, it takes Havok about 17 hours to recharge to peak level under normal circumstances. The concentration involved in releasing his energy in focused beams is exhausting for Havok, especially if he does it over an extended period.

Havok can also use stored energy for flight by directing it as a downward thrust. At full energy capacity, he has an easier time managing his energized propulsion through his powers. By emanating plasma from his body in directed waves, he can form a sort of shield against projectile weapons for a short time.

Havok has demonstrated immunity to his brother Cyclops's optic beams. Similarly, Cyclops is immune to Havok's power.

Havok has the normal human strength, height, and build of a man who engages in intensive regular exercise. Havok is well-educated in the field of geophysical science, where he has earned a master's degree and completed some doctoral work, and he has been trained in hand-to-hand combat and martial arts by Wolverine. He is an instinctive tactician and strategist.

It was also revealed in the Mutant X and Exiles books that his body and mind were a nexus for all other Alex Summers in other realities and his very existence is sort of a "back door" to the others.

== Reception ==
- In 2013, ComicsAlliance ranked Havok as #44 on their list of the "50 Sexiest Male Characters in Comics".
- In 2014, Entertainment Weekly ranked Havok 12th in their "Let's rank every X-Man ever" list.
- Comicbook.com ranked Havok 10th in "10 X-Men Batman Could Beat (Ranked By How Hard It'd Be)".
- CBR ranked Havok 1st in "Best X-Factor Members, Ranked".

== Other versions ==
=== Age of Apocalypse ===
In the Age of Apocalypse continuity, Alex and his brother Scott are not separated after the plane crash but adopted together by Sinister, working to oversee Sinister's interests. Alex, being the more emotional and thus unstable of the two, loses ground in Sinister's eyes and watches with envy as his brother gains favor.

Scott, inspired by Jean Grey, releases Sinister's prisoners. Alex exposes his brother as a traitor by asking Scott to execute Jean Grey, which Scott refuses to do. Following this, Alex has Scott arrested and gives him over to Dark Beast for experiments; however, Jean Grey and Scott escape. Alex tracks them down and knocks out his brother and seemingly kills Jean, but is killed by Weapon X.

=== Age of Ultron ===
When Wolverine kills Hank Pym to avert the future in which Ultron nearly annihilated the human race in the Age of Ultron reality, a new timeline where Morgan le Fay conquered half the world is created. In this timeline, Havok is the leader of the Morlocks until he is killed by Uriel.

=== New Exiles ===
On the world of the Sons of Iron and Daughters of the Dragon, the New Exiles face a squad of alternate 'core X-Men' who are loyal to Lilandra Neramani. These X-Men include an alternate version of Alex Summers known as Warshot.

=== Ultimate Marvel ===
In the Ultimate Marvel continuity of Ultimate X-Men, Havok is the field leader of the Academy of Tomorrow. During the events of "Ultimatum", the Academy of Tomorrow is attacked and everyone inside are killed by Jamie Madrox. Havok is presumed dead, but resurfaces as a patient of the mental institute Kennerman Acres, where he is found by Mister Sinister.

== In other media ==
=== Television ===
- Havok appears in X-Men: The Animated Series, voiced by an uncredited actor. This version is a member of X-Factor who is romantically involved with Polaris and not explicitly stated to have a connection to Cyclops.
  - Havok appears in the second season of X-Men '97, voiced by Teddy Sears.
- Havok appears in X-Men: Evolution, voiced by Matt Hill. This version was adopted by the Masters family and comes off as a stereotypical "surfer dude". Additionally, his powers manifest as red energy blasts. In the two-part first season finale "The Cauldron", Havok reunites with Cyclops and forms a bond with him before Magneto recruits him into his Acolytes and uses the Gem of Cyttorak to enhance his powers. Upon realizing Magneto is using him, Havok joins forces with Cyclops and the X-Men to defeat Magneto, losing his enhancements in the process. Though he is offered membership into the X-Men, Havok declines in favor of pursuing professional surfing. In the two-part series finale "Ascension", Havok helps the X-Men defeat Apocalypse.

=== Film ===
- Alex Summers appears in X-Men: First Class, portrayed by Lucas Till. This version was imprisoned in a government prison within solitary confinement due to his powers until he is recruited by Charles Xavier and Erik Lehnsherr to combat the Hellfire Club. After indirectly killing fellow recruit Darwin, Alex works to control his powers with help from Xavier and Hank McCoy despite initial difficulty and helps the fledgling X-Men defeat the Hellfire Club.
- Alex Summers appears in X-Men: Days of Future Past, portrayed again by Lucas Till. Following the X-Men's disbandment, he joined a special division of the U.S. Army and took part in the Vietnam War. Alex and his division are nearly captured by William Stryker on Bolivar Trask's behalf, but Mystique rescues them and sends them back to the U.S.
- Alex Summers appears in X-Men: Apocalypse, portrayed again by Lucas Till. After escorting his younger brother Scott Summers to Xavier when his powers manifest, Alex destroys Cerebro to prevent Apocalypse from using it, though he inadvertently destroys the X-Mansion and is later considered missing-in-action despite Peter Maximoff's best efforts.

=== Video games ===
- Havok appears as a playable character in X-Men: Mutant Academy 2, voiced by Rod Wilson.
- Havok appears as a playable character in X-Men II: The Fall of the Mutants.
- Havok appears as a playable character in X-Men: Mojo World.
- Havok appears as a playable character in X-Men: Next Dimension, voiced by Wally Wingert.
- Havok appears in Wolverine.
- Havok appears as an NPC in X-Men Legends, voiced by Matt Nolan. This version is initially a member of the Brotherhood of Mutants until he develops second thoughts, is imprisoned by the Blob for mutiny, and freed by the X-Men, whom he defects to.
- Havok appears as an NPC in X-Men Legends II: Rise of Apocalypse, voiced by Scott Holst. As of this game, he now serves as the X-Men's pilot.
- Havok appears as a boss in the PS3 and Xbox 360 versions of Marvel: Ultimate Alliance 2, voiced by Jason Zumwalt. This version supports Captain America in opposing the Superhuman Registration Act.
- Havok appears as a playable character in Marvel Super Hero Squad Online, voiced by Travis Willingham.
- Havok appears as an unlockable character in Marvel Avengers Alliance.
- Havok clones appear in Deadpool. These versions fire yellow energy balls instead of the traditional blue.
- Havok appears in Marvel Heroes, voiced by Liam O'Brien.
- Havok appears in Lego Marvel Super Heroes, voiced by Greg Cipes.
- Havok appears as a playable character in Marvel Puzzle Quest.
- Havok appears in Marvel Snap.

=== Merchandise ===
- Iron Studios released a figure of Havok in his original X-Factor costume.

== Collected editions ==
Title	Material collected	Published date	ISBN
Havok & Wolverine: Meltdown	Havok & Wolverine: Meltdown #1-4	July 2019	978-1302918958
