= House of X and Powers of X =

Comic books

House of X
- Cover of House of X #1

Publication information
- Publisher: Marvel Comics
- Format: Limited series
- Genre: Superhero
- Publication date: July – October 2019
- No. of issues: 6
- Main character: X-Men

Creative team
- Written by: Jonathan Hickman
- Penciller: Pepe Larraz
- Inker: Pepe Larraz
- Letterer: Clayton Cowles
- Colorist: Marte Gracia
- Editor(s): Jordan D. White; Annalise Bissa

Powers of X
- Powers of X #1

Publication information
- Publisher: Marvel Comics
- Format: Limited series
- Genre: Superhero
- Publication date: July – October 2019
- No. of issues: 6
- Main character: X-Men

Creative team
- Written by: Jonathan Hickman
- Penciller: R. B. Silva
- Inker(s): R. B. Silva; Adriano Di Benedetto
- Letterer: Clayton Cowles
- Colorist: Marte Gracia
- Editor(s): Jordan D. White; Annalise Bissa

House of X and Powers of X (Note: Powers of X is pronounced as "Powers of Ten".) (abbreviated as HOX and POX) are two 2019 comic book miniseries published by Marvel Comics featuring the X-Men by writer Jonathan Hickman and artists Pepe Larraz, R. B. Silva, and Marte Gracia. Both books are part of a crossover storyline within the Marvel Universe that led to the "Dawn of X" relaunch and started the Krakoan Age (October 2019 – June 2024).

== Publication history ==
After Jonathan Hickman completed his run on Avengers and New Avengers with the 2015 crossover "Secret Wars", he stepped away from Marvel Comics for a time to focus on creator-owned projects. His return was announced in March 2019. Some days later, it was revealed that Hickman would write two interlocking miniseries entitled House of X and Powers of X, with penciling by Pepe Larraz and R. B. Silva respectively. Marvel editor-in-chief C. B. Cebulski said that "We are excited to have Jon back with the Marvel family, and we could not have asked for a better creative team to help usher the X-Men into a whole new era".

The comics marked a company-wide relaunch of the X-Men. To this end, all ongoing X-Men comics - Uncanny X-Men, Mr. and Mrs. X, X-Force, X-23, and the Age of X-Man miniseries - were cancelled.

In early 2024, as the Krakoan age of X-Men launched by HOX/POX was drawing to a close, an experimental edition of this series arranged in chronological order was released on Marvel Unlimited. Inspired by the chronological order feature on the DVD of Memento, it is described by editor Jordan D. White as a fun different perspective, but "NOT the recommended way to read the series!".

== Plot ==
=== Part 1: "The House that Xavier Built" ===
Several ambassadors arrive at the Jerusalem Habitat, responding to a telepathic message sent by Charles Xavier to recognize a new sovereign nation of mutants, called Krakoa. The ambassadors are met by the newly appointed Krakoan ambassador Magneto.

Near the sun, spacecraft approach the station known as "The Forge," home base of a human group called Orchis. Orchis is the self-proclaimed "last hope" for humanity, made up of various members of human organizations such as A.I.M., S.H.I.E.L.D., Hydra, Alpha Flight, and others, allied to prevent the extinction of Homo sapiens to mutants.

Meanwhile, Mystique, Sabretooth, and Toad infiltrate the base of Damage Control searching for information in the databases. While they get what they searched for, Sabretooth maims several guards in the chaos and is eventually captured by the Fantastic Four.

=== Part 2: "The Last Dream of Professor X" ===
In the past, Moira MacTaggert meets with Charles Xavier. In the present, Mystique gives the intel she stole to Professor X and Magneto. A hundred years into the future, the remnants of mutantkind on Earth war with the Man Machine Supremacy; the mutants Rasputin and Cardinal flee with intel stolen from the machines while their comrade Cylobel is captured and later killed by Nimrod and Omega Sentinel as the machines attempt to learn what intel the mutants stole. A thousand years into the future, a post-human referred to as the Librarian and Nimrod (now reduced to a small flying unit) reminisce about mutantkind and the surprising end of their war with humanity and the machines.

=== Part 3: "The Uncanny Life of Moira X" ===
Moira MacTaggert is retroactively revealed to be a mutant with the ability to be reborn after dying while retaining all of the memories of her past lives. In this way, the different histories of the X-Men are seen to be timelines that she has lived through. She is told during one of her timelines by Destiny that she has 10, perhaps 11 timelines in total.

=== Part 4: "We Are Together Now, You and I" ===
In the past, Professor X and Moira MacTaggert meet with Magneto and recruit him to their cause. In the present, Professor X and Magneto meet with Cyclops and order him to form a team to assault the Orchis Forge and destroy Mother Mold. A hundred years into the future, it is revealed that the intel the mutants stole was an index machine to help them find the actual information they need, but retrieving said information will be a suicide mission; Apocalypse, the leader of the mutant remnants, vows to lead them in this mission. A thousand years into the future, the Librarian alongside his post-human brethren await the arrival of the Phalanx, who have responded to post-humanity's summons.

=== Part 5: "This Is What You Do" ===
A hundred years into the future, the mutants carry out their mission, splitting into two teams. Rasputin's team attacks a human church to draw out Omega Sentinel and the rest of the machines, and everyone dies in the mutants' ensuing suicide attack. Meanwhile, Apocalypse's team retrieves the information they are after (the date of Nimrod's creation) but are confronted by Nimrod himself; Apocalypse dies fighting Nimrod to ensure Wolverine's escape. Wolverine awakens Moira from stasis, imprints the intel into her, then kills her to reset the timeline, revealing this future to be Moira's ninth life.

=== Part 6: "Once More unto the Breach" ===
Cyclops informs X and Magneto that he has assembled a team in order to attack the Mother Mold facility orbiting the Sun. After meeting, they embark on the mission.

=== Part 7: "It Will Be Done" ===
On Krakoa, X and Magneto contact Marvel Girl to monitor the mission. Wolverine and Nightcrawler are successful in destroying the collars, but the ship is boarded by Orchis forces. The humans activate Mother Mold, not knowing whether it will be sane or not. X tells them to do whatever it takes to stop it. Nightcrawler teleports Wolverine onto the collar before being instantly evaporated by the sun. Wolverine's healing factor allows him time to carve through it before he too is evaporated as Mother Mold hurtles into the sun.

With the mission complete, Cyclops tries to locate Jean's pod, but Doctor Gregor executes him. The Sentinel drones arrive, intercept Jean's pod, and work to kill her. As his protégés have seemingly all died at the hands of humans once again, X cries and vows "no more".

=== Part 8: "Something Sinister" ===
In the past, Professor X and Magneto meet with Mister Sinister to elicit his help in building a database of mutant DNA. Several months before the Krakoan nation is established, Professor X arranges a meeting between Cypher and Krakoa, telling Cypher to develop a unique language for mutants. A thousand years into the future, post-humanity offers to be willingly assimilated by the Phalanx, and await to see if the Phalanx finds them acceptable.

=== Part 9: "Society" ===
On Krakoa, X, Magneto, Storm, and Polaris assemble and are joined by five other mutants: Tempus, Proteus, Hope Summers, Elixir, and Egg. Magneto explains that the five mutants, collectively known as The Five, are able to combine their powers to revive deceased mutants. Storm brings The Five and the revived mutants out, proudly announcing that The Five has allowed the nation of Krakoa to defeat death. The revived mutants enter the crowd as Storm calls them the "Heroes of Krakoa".

=== Part 10: "For the Children" ===
In the past, Professor X meets with Forge to discuss modifying Cerebro in order to create a backup for every mutant mind on the planet. Several months before the Krakoan nation is established, Professor X and Magneto recruit Emma Frost to their cause. Professor X later uses Cerebro to invite every mutant - hero or villain - to Krakoa. Namor refuses Professor X's invitation. A thousand years into the future, the Phalanx agree to assimilate post-humanity, with the Phalanx eventually merging with their masters, the godlike Dominion. However the assimilation of post-humanity will destroy the Earth and kill every living thing on it.

=== Part 11: "I Am Not Ashamed" ===
One month prior to the events of the series, Xavier uses Cerebro to offer Krakoa's miracle drugs to all of humanity.

=== Part 12: "House of X" ===
A thousand years into the future, a conflicted Librarian confronts Wolverine and Moira in post-humanity's mutant reservation. The Librarian reveals post-humanity's plans for ascension and its consequences, as well as the truth of post-humanity's role in the resolution of the human-mutant-machine war. Having learned what they needed to know, Wolverine kills the Librarian and Moira to reset the timeline, revealing this future to be Moira's sixth life. In the past, the young Charles Xavier reels at the knowledge from Moira's mind; Moira swears to break the goodness out of Xavier for the cause and tells him to give up his dream. In the present, despite Moira's cynicism that mutantkind is destined for defeat, Professor X and Magneto vow that things will be different this time.

== Characters involved ==
=== Main characters ===
Issues	Main characters
House of X #1-6; Power of X #1-6	Alia Mendel; Apocalypse; Archangel; Black King; Cardinal; Cyclobel; Cyclops; Cypher; Destiny; Exodus; Human Torch; Husk; Invisible Woman; Krakoa; Librarian; Magneto; Marvel Girl; Mister Fantastic; Mister Sinister; Moira MacTaggert; Mystique; Nightcrawler; Nimrod; North; Omega Sentinel; Penance; Professor X; Rasputin IV; Sabretooth; Storm; Thing; White Queen; Wolverine; Xorn

== Reception ==
House of X holds an average rating of 9.2 by 130 professional critics, while Powers of X holds a rating of 8.8 by 121 critics on review aggregation website Comic Book Roundup.

== Prints ==
=== House of X issues ===
Issue	Title	Publication Date	Comic Book Roundup Rating	Estimated Sales to North American Retailers (First Month)
#1	"The House That Xavier Built"	July 24, 2019	9.2 by 32 professional critics.	185,630
#2	"The Uncanny Life of Moira X"	August 7, 2019	9.3 by 24 professional critics.	101,972
#3	"Once More Unto the Breach"	August 28, 2019	8.9 by 20 professional critics.	109,110
#4	"It Will Be Done"	September 4, 2019	9.3 by 19 professional critics.	119,366
#5	"Society"	September 18, 2019	9.5 by 16 professional critics.	139,306
#6	“I Am Not Ashamed of What I Am”	October 2, 2019	9.3 by 19 professional critics.	158,396

=== Powers of X issues ===
Issue	Title	Publication Date	Comic Book Roundup Rating	Estimated Sales to North American Retailers (First Month)
#1	"The Last Dream of Professor X"	July 31, 2019	8.9 by 25 professional critics.	167,840
#2	"We Are Together Now, You and I"	August 14, 2019	8.7 by 22 professional critics.	107,524
#3	"This Is What You Do"	August 21, 2019	8.8 by 21 professional critics.	100,267
#4	"Something Sinister"	September 11, 2019	8.5 by 17 professional critics.	127,076
#5	"For the Children"	September 25, 2019	8.5 by 17 professional critics.	137,550
#6	"House of X"	October 9, 2019	9.0 by 16 professional critics.	160,845

== Collected editions ==
Title	Material Collected	Format	Publication date	ISBN
House of X/Powers of X	House of X #1-6, Powers of X #1-6	Hardcover	November 2019	ISBN 978-1-302-91570-4

== In other media ==
- Marvel: Future Fight features alternate costumes for Magneto, Wolverine, Professor X, Jean Grey and Storm based on their House of X incarnations.
- Marvel Contest of Champions features an alternate costume for Magneto based on his House of X incarnation. Professor X's main costume is based on his House of X incarnation.
