= Operation: Zero Tolerance =

Marvel Comics storyline

- Cover of X-Men vol. 2, 67 (Sept, 1997); Featuring Bastion, Iceman and Cecilia Reyes, art by Carlos Pacheco
- Publisher: Marvel Comics
- Publication date: May – November 1997
- Genre: Superhero; Crossover
Title(s)
Cable #45-47
Cable / Machine Man `98 #1
Generation X #27 29-31
Machine Man / Bastion '98 #1
The Uncanny X-Men #346
Wolverine (vol. 2) #115-118
X-Force #68-70
X-Men (vol. 2) #65-69
X-Man #30
- Main character(s): X-Men; Bastion; Henry Peter Gyrich

"Operation: Zero Tolerance" was a crossover storyline that ran through Marvel Comics' X-Men related titles during 1997. The story followed from the "Onslaught Saga" and focused on individuals, including Bastion and Henry Peter Gyrich, within the United States government and their attempts to use their positions to hunt and kill all mutants across the country. Within the story, the program is known as "Operation: Zero Tolerance".

== Build-up to Operation: Zero Tolerance ==
=== Lead-in ===
Before the Onslaught crossover, Bastion introduces himself to high echelons and foreign dignitaries in a secret meeting in the sub-basement of the Pentagon. He gives hints that whatever Onslaught is, he threatens both humans and mutants. As for the "mutant problem", he offers the services of his project, "Operation: Zero Tolerance".

Bastion has also started operations to escalate human-mutant frictions and accelerate his "Zero Tolerance" plan, as well as pulling political strings with Valerie Cooper to use X-Factor (led by Forge at the time) as his personal "mutant militia".

=== Aftermath of the Onslaught Saga ===
Most of the core non-mutant superhero teams (the Fantastic Four, a number of Avengers and Bruce Banner), along with the surprising aid of Doctor Doom, in the Marvel universe "sacrificed" themselves in order to help destroy Onslaught by leaping into his body, which consisted of raw energy at the time. The only superheroes who were left outside of Onslaught were all mutants who could not enter into Onslaught due to his ability to siphon their powers and a handful of non-mutant superheroes including Spider-Man, Daredevil, and Doctor Strange that were not present at the battle. Members of the X-Men were then left to physically attack Onslaught directly and eventually succeeded in destroying him and in the process, seemingly those who had leapt into his energy form as well.

Bastion has invested time and resources in Graydon Creed's anti-mutant campaign in order to expedite his own anti-mutant plan: "Operation: Zero Tolerance".

Professor Charles Xavier surrenders himself to the United States government (represented by Valerie Cooper) and is taken to a secret location, where he is subject to Bastion's interrogation techniques.

=== The assassination of Graydon Creed ===
The disappearance of non-mutant heroes led to a great amount of distrust being harbored toward all mutantkind. Shortly thereafter, Graydon Creed was assassinated by what was meant to look like an energy blast of some kind. This escalated humanity's festering feelings toward mutants.

The fallout of both of these events served as a springboard for the man known as Bastion to suggest to the government that they should begin a plan. In order to keep the nation safe from the growing mutant threat, Bastion proposed the capture and extermination of as many mutants as he could find.

== Plot ==
Bastion, along with the aid of his newly constructed Prime Sentinels, is given approval to implement this plan, which is dubbed "Operation: Zero Tolerance".

=== Prelude ===
Bastion captures Jubilation Lee and makes her his prisoner.

Returning from a mission in Hong Kong, a team of five X-Men (consisting of Cyclops, Jean Grey, Storm, Wolverine, and Cannonball) are attacked mid-air by Prime Sentinels. All five are captured and exposed to Xavier to further humiliate him. Henry Peter Gyrich spins a false story that the X-Men attacked American authorities and their reaction was in self-defense.

Bastion is also able to seize control of the Xavier Institute for Higher Learning, gaining access to vital information regarding numerous mutants.

=== Main issues ===
==== Prisoners ====
Over the course of the story, Jubilee is captured and mentally abused in order to access the secrets she knows.

The five captured X-Men make their escape from a compound of Operation Zero Tolerance and hide in the desert.

==== X-Mansion invaded ====
Cable infiltrates the X-Mansion after it was occupied by Operation: Zero Tolerance to free Caliban and destroy Xavier's files to prevent Bastion from getting access to them. The X-Mansion is stripped of its technology.

==== On the run ====
Cecilia Reyes and Marrow join the X-Men after confronting Bastion with Iceman. During this time, Iceman acts as a leader of the small splinter group he is traveling with (consisting of the previous mentioned Cecilia Reyes and Marrow as well as Sabra, who has been tracking Bastion and investigating the actions of the Operation: Zero Tolerance operatives). Despite initially being ambushed by numerous Prime Sentinels, they manage to locate the home of Rose Gilberti, the woman who cared for Bastion, in Connecticut. Upon their arrival, they are surprised by Bastion and the Prime Sentinels, who have been waiting in the home after having taken both Gilberti and a detective's son hostage. After hearing what Bastion has to say in regard to her mother, Marrow becomes enraged and tries to viciously assault the woman, claiming revenge for the fate that her mentor Callisto suffered as a result of her encounter with Operation: Zero Tolerance. This prompts Iceman to stop her, only to mount an attack against Bastion on his own. Iceman is able to catch Bastion by surprise, knocking him out of the house and onto a nearby shoreline. Despite initially having the upper hand against Bastion, Iceman halts his attack in an attempt to goad Bastion into killing him. As Bastion begins to relay orders to his battalion of Prime Sentinels to destroy the mutants, S.H.I.E.L.D. forces converge en masse to the shoreline, revoking the rights of Operation: Zero Tolerance to further act on American soil. Faced with the knowledge that S.H.I.E.L.D. has been given authorization to use necessary force to stop him, Bastion issues the command to his Prime Sentinels to stand down. Bastion is then arrested and taken into S.H.I.E.L.D. custody at the end of the storyline.

== Aftermath ==
=== To the X-Men ===
Cyclops has a bomb implanted in his chest after being shot by a Prime Sentinel. He is taken to the X-Mansion and operated on by Dr. Cecilia Reyes. After the operation, Cyclops and Phoenix take a sabbatical in Alaska.

The X-Men welcome Maggott, Marrow, and Cecilia Reyes their ranks. However, their presence causes quite a stir among its members: Maggott believes Joseph is a younger version of Magneto, whom he has met in the past; Marrow takes a liking to Cannonball, but trades blows with Storm and Wolverine; Cecilia Reyes is still adjusting to being outed as a mutant.

In X-Men Unlimited #27, published during the Revolution, it is shown that, during the height of Bastion's operations, he was also present in India, where his operatives were capturing homeless people. One of the Bastion's victims was Neal Shaara's brother. Neal and detective Karima Shapandar investigate into the matter and are taken by Operation: Zero Tolerance to be experimented on: Karima is turned into a Prime Sentinel and Neal's powers are activated for the first time.

=== To Bastion and the Operation ===
It is later revealed that Bastion was created after the mutant-hunting Sentinel Nimrod and the Sentinel-creating robot Master Mold were taken through the Siege Perilous and reborn together.

In X-Men (vol. 2) Annual 2000, Stryfe, Cable's villainous clone, activates several dormant Prime Sentinels to attack the X-Men.

== Known operatives ==
- Bastion
- Daria
- Com
- Ekatarina Gryaznova
- Harper
- Arvell
- Curtis
- Felipe
- Helmut
- Mustang
- Number 5
- Sanjit
- Saroyan
- Karima Shapandar
- Tanya

== Collected editions ==
The storyline has been collected into a trade paperback:

- X-Men: Zero Tolerance (320 pages, March 1, 2000, ISBN 978-0-7851-0738-5)

Collects Generation X 27, X-Force 67–69, X-Men 65–70, Wolverine 115–118, Cable 45–47, X-Man 30

It has also been collected into a hardcover:

- X-Men: Operation Zero Tolerance (640 pages, August 15, 2012, ISBN 0785162402)

Collects Generation X 26–31, X-Force 67–70, X-Men 65–70, Uncanny X-Men 346, Wolverine 115–118, Cable 45–47, X-Man 30

== In other media ==
- The 2002 fighting game X-Men: Next Dimension serves as a sequel to the events of Operation: Zero Tolerance. In the storyline, Forge was kidnapped by Prime Sentinels because of his knowledge of a weapon that can end all mutantkind. In the end, the X-Men and the Brotherhood of Mutants defeated Bastion and rescued Forge from being killed.
- An adaption of Operation: Zero Tolerance appears in X-Men '97 three-part episode "Tolerance is Extinction". It was founded by the United Nations with the shortened name OZT and consists of Bastion, his personal assistant Daria, Mister Sinister, Helmut Zemo, Doctor Doom, and Prime Sentinel versions of Bolivar Trask, Trish Tilby, and Rose Gilberti.
