= Omega Sentinel =

Omega Sentinel can refer to:

- A Marvel Comics character more commonly called Karima Shapandar.
- A Transformers character or series of characters related to incarnations of Omega Supreme.
