= Mutant X =

Mutant X may refer to:

- Mutant X (comics), a Marvel Comics series
- Proteus (Marvel Comics), a Marvel Comics fictional character, originally known as 'Mutant X'
- Mutant X (TV series), a television show produced by Marvel Studios that ran from 2001 to 2004
