= Professor X =

Comic book character

- Professor X taken from the cover of Excalibur #4 (October 2004). Art by Andy Park.

Publication information
- Publisher: Marvel Comics
- First appearance: The X-Men #1 (September 1963)
- Created by: Stan Lee (writer); Jack Kirby (artist/co-plotter)

In-story information
- Alter ego: Prof. Charles Francis Xavier
- Species: Human mutant
- Place of origin: New York City
- Team affiliations: X-Men; Illuminati; X-Corporation; The Twelve; New Mutants; Genoshan Excalibur; Starjammers; Cadre K Brotherhood of Mutants; United States Army; Quiet Council of Krakoa
- Notable aliases: Consort-Royal; Founder; Doctor X Warlord; Entity; Prisoner M-13; X
- Abilities: Telepathy; Genius intelligence

Professor X (Prof. Charles Francis Xavier) is a character appearing in American comic books published by Marvel Comics. Created by writer Stan Lee and artist/co-writer Jack Kirby, the character first appeared in The X-Men #1 (September 1963). The character is depicted as the founder and occasional leader of the X-Men.

Xavier is a member of a subspecies of humans known as mutants, who are born with superhuman abilities. He is an exceptionally powerful telepath, who can read and control the minds of others. To both shelter and train mutants from around the world, he runs a private school in the X-Mansion in Salem Center, located in Westchester County, New York. Xavier also strives to serve the greater good by promoting peaceful coexistence and equality between humans and mutants in a world where zealous anti-mutant bigotry is widespread. However, he later abandons his dream in favor of establishing a mutant nation in Krakoa.

Throughout much of the character's history, Xavier has been depicted with paraplegia and uses a wheelchair. One of the world's most powerful mutant telepaths, Xavier is a scientific genius and a leading authority in genetics. He has devised Cerebro and other equipment to enhance psionic powers and detect and track people with the mutant gene.

Xavier's pacifist and assimilationist ideology and actions have often been contrasted with that of Magneto, a mutant leader (initially characterized as a supervillain and later as a complex antihero) with whom Xavier has a complicated relationship. Fans and commentators often compare Xavier and Magneto to Martin Luther King Jr. and Malcolm X respectively, though the amount of authorial intent supporting this comparison is disputed. Writer Chris Claremont, who developed Xavier's characterization and originated Magneto's backstory, drew from Israeli politics, comparing Xavier to David Ben-Gurion and Magneto to Menachem Begin. Later writers have additionally emphasized secretive, ruthless, and manipulative aspects of Xavier, while the later "Krakoan Age" storyline sees him align with Magneto to establish a sovereign mutant nation.

Professor X has been substantially adapted into media outside comics, including animated series and video games. The character has been portrayed by Patrick Stewart and James McAvoy in 20th Century Fox's X-Men film series (2000–2019), and by Harry Lloyd in the third season of the television series Legion (2019). Stewart reprised the role in the Marvel Cinematic Universe films Doctor Strange in the Multiverse of Madness (2022) and Avengers: Doomsday (2026). Christopher Abbott will portray the primary MCU's incarnation of Professor X in the untitled X-Men film (2028).

== Publication history ==
=== Creation and influences ===
Created by writer Stan Lee and artist/co-writer Jack Kirby, Professor X first appeared in X-Men #1 (September 1963). Stan Lee has stated that the physical inspiration of Professor Xavier was from Academy Award-winning actor Yul Brynner. The first issue introduces the original team, with Marvel Girl presented as a new pupil at Xavier's school, apparently the first female student, and meeting Cyclops, Beast, Angel, and Iceman. In X-Men #7, Professor X briefly leaves the X-Men and leaves Cyclops in command. Ben Saunders observes that "the direction of the X-Men will often pivot on the question of Xavier's absence or presence, and the emotional impact of his comings and goings on the team, particularly on Cyclops."

Xavier's goals are to promote the peaceful affirmation of mutant rights, to mediate the co-existence of mutants and humans, to protect mutants from violent humans, and to protect society from antagonistic mutants, including his old friend, Magneto. To achieve these aims, he founded Xavier's School for Gifted Youngsters (later named the Xavier Institute) to teach mutants to explore and control their powers. Xavier's students consider him a visionary and often refer to their mission as "Xavier's dream". He is highly regarded by others in the Marvel Universe, respected by various governments, and trusted by several other superhero teams, including the Avengers and the Fantastic Four.

=== Later stories ===
Writer Scott Lobdell established Xavier's middle name to be "Francis" in Uncanny X-Men #309 (February 1994).

He often acts as a public advocate for mutant rights and is the authority most of the Marvel superhero community turns to for advice on mutants. In a number of comics, Xavier is shown to have a dark side, a part of himself that he struggles to suppress. In X-Men #106 (August 1977), the new X-Men fight images of the original team, which have been created by what Xavier says is his "evil self ... who would use his powers for personal gain and conquest", which he says he is normally able to keep in check. In the 1984 four-part series titled The X-Men and the Micronauts, Xavier's dark desires manifest themselves as the Entity and threaten to destroy the Micronauts' universe.

In the Onslaught storyline, the crossover event's antagonist is a physical manifestation of Xavier's dark side. Also, Onslaught is created in the most violent act Xavier claims to have done: erasing the mind of Magneto. During the Onslaught storyline, the X-Men find Xavier's files, the "Xavier Protocols", which detail how to kill many of the characters, including Xavier himself, should the need ever arise, such as if they went rogue.

While he always presented himself as an advocate for mutant rights, Professor X's status as a mutant himself and originator of the X-Men only became public during the 2001 story "E Is for Extinction". In Astonishing X-Men vol. 3, #12 (August 2005), it is revealed that Xavier keeps the Danger Room trapped and experiments on it for years despite learning of its sentience, an act that Cyclops calls "the oppression of a new life" and equates to humanity's treatment of mutants. However, X-Men Legacy #220 - 224 reveals that Xavier did not intend for the Danger Room to become sentient: it was an accident, and Xavier sought a way to free Danger, but was unable to find a way to accomplish this without deleting her sentience as well.

== Fictional character biography ==
A young Charles Xavier. Story by Stan Lee. Art by Jack Kirby, Alex Toth, and Vincent Colletta.

Charles Francis Xavier was born in New York City to Dr. Brian Xavier, a wealthy and respected nuclear scientist, and Sharon Xavier. The family lives in a grand mansion in Westchester County. Xavier is an excellent student and athlete, though he gives up sports because he feels his powers give him an unfair advantage. He enters Bard College at 16 and graduates in two years with a degree in biology. He goes on to earn Ph.D.s in genetics, biophysics, psychology and anthropology, spending two years at Pembroke College, University of Oxford. After several years in London he also receives an M.D. in psychiatry. He later becomes an adjunct professor at Columbia University.

At graduate school, Xavier falls in love with a fellow genetics student, Moira Kinross, and they agree to marry. He is then drafted into the Korean War, and while he is away Moira breaks up with him. Xavier begins to travel the world.

In Haifa, Israel, he works with Holocaust victims and meets Magnus, a survivor who volunteers there, and Gabrielle Haller, who has been left catatonic by trauma. Xavier uses his powers to bring her out of it, and the two fall in love. He and Magnus become friends, though neither tells the other that he is a mutant. Magnus believes humanity will always oppress mutants, which clashes with Xavier's hope for peace between the two, and he leaves. Xavier and Gabrielle part on good terms, neither knowing that she is pregnant with his son David, who grows up to be the mutant Legion.

Near the Himalayas, Xavier foils the alien Lucifer, the advance scout for an invasion. Lucifer drops a stone block on him, paralyzing his legs. Sage hears his telepathic cries and rescues him, and he is treated in an Indian hospital by Amelia Voght.

Xavier turns his family mansion into Xavier's School for Gifted Youngsters, a safe place for mutants to learn to control their powers. He hopes the X-Men, his superhero team, will show humans that mutants can act in good faith. His first five students, Cyclops, Iceman, Angel, Beast and Marvel Girl, become the original X-Men. He also forms a psychic bond with Princess Lilandra Neramani of the Shi'ar empire, and they fall in love when they meet in person.

The alien Brood capture Xavier and implant him with an egg that puts him under their control. The X-Men and the Starjammers cannot remove it, so they move his consciousness into a cloned body. The new body has working legs, though the psychosomatic pain of his years as a paraplegic takes time to fade.

After a reformed Magneto is put on trial, Xavier comes to defend him. The courtroom is attacked by Andrea and Andreas Strucker, and Xavier is badly hurt. He leaves Earth with the Shi'ar to recover and hands the X-Men to Magneto. In space he joins the Starjammers and becomes Lilandra's consort. He returns to Earth after escaping the Skrulls, but in the "Muir Island Saga" the Shadow King shatters his spine, and he is a paraplegic again.

In the "Age of Apocalypse" series, Xavier is killed saving Magneto from Legion, which leads to a timeline where Apocalypse conquers most of the Earth. Magneto's X-Men travel back in time, save Xavier and restore the main universe.

Xavier is for a time the unknowing host of Onslaught, a psionic entity formed from the repressed emotions of Xavier and Magneto. Onslaught destroys much of Manhattan before Marvel's heroes defeat him. Xavier loses his telepathy and, guilt-ridden, leaves the X-Men and is imprisoned. He returns after Operation: Zero Tolerance.

Xavier's twin, Cassandra Nova, whom he tried to kill in the womb, sends rogue Sentinels to destroy the mutant nation of Genosha, where Magneto appears to die along with most of its people. Nova then takes over Xavier's body and attacks the Shi'ar empire. The X-Men restore him, but Lilandra annuls their marriage, believing that the Shi'ar's ties to the X-Men have caused too much disaster. Xorn joins the X-Men and heals Xavier's legs.

Nova has also outed Xavier as a mutant, so he begins giving public speeches about mutant tolerance and founds the X-Corporation to protect mutant rights. When student Quentin Quire and his gang start a riot at the school, Quire and two other students are killed. Doubting his dream, Xavier says he will step down as headmaster in favor of Jean Grey. After Xorn kills her, he leaves the school to Cyclops and Emma Frost.

=== House of M ===
In House of M, Scarlet Witch creates a reality in which mutants rule and Xavier appears to have been killed. When she restores reality, most mutants lose their powers, and Xavier is missing; the X-Men cannot find him with Cerebro.

=== Deadly Genesis ===
In Deadly Genesis, Xavier, now without powers but able to walk, reveals that he secretly trained a second X-Men team before the Giant-Size X-Men team. Most of them were seemingly killed rescuing the original X-Men from Krakoa, and only Vulcan survived. Xavier forms a new team with Havok and Darwin and goes after Vulcan, who wants revenge on the Shi'ar. Vulcan abducts him and throws him into the M'Kraan Crystal, which restores his powers.

=== Messiah Complex ===
In Messiah Complex, Xavier senses a new mutant so powerful that it overloads Cerebra. He clashes with Cyclops, who tells him he is no longer needed to run the X-Men and later says he must leave the mansion. Xavier is shot in the head by Bishop in the fighting over the mutant child and left comatose. Exodus, Magneto and Karima Shapandar save his life, but he is left partly amnesiac, and he leaves them to visit people from his past in hope of recovering his memories.

=== Dark Reign ===
In Dark Reign, Mystique poses as Xavier to denounce Cyclops while the real Xavier is held on Alcatraz and slowly drained of his powers. He later joins the other X-Men on Asteroid M, renamed Utopia, and sits on its leadership council. He still worries about Cyclops's decisions, and Cyclops will not let him leave to clear his name, preferring to keep him as an ace in the hole. When Magneto arrives on Utopia, Xavier does not trust him and attacks him telepathically until Cyclops makes him stop. He later apologizes.

=== Second Coming ===
In Second Coming, Xavier gives a eulogy at Nightcrawler's funeral and helps Legion control his personalities and fight the Nimrods. At the end, he watches the aftermath from a helicopter and says that Hope may have come to save mutantkind, but she is still young and has a hard road ahead.

=== Avengers vs. X-Men ===
In "Avengers vs. X-Men", the Phoenix Force splits into five pieces and bonds with Cyclops, Emma Frost, Namor, Colossus and Magik. Cyclops and Frost eventually hold the whole Phoenix Force, and Xavier is killed by Cyclops while confronting them. After facing the Shadow King on the astral plane, he returns in the body of Fantomex and later builds himself a new body.

=== Dawn of X ===
Xavier and Magneto set up Krakoa as a mutant nation, and Xavier's legs are healed. With Forge's help he upgrades Cerebro so it can copy and store mutants' minds. The Five, made up of Hope Summers, Goldballs, Elixir, Proteus and Tempus, combine their abilities to resurrect dead mutants. Xavier sits on the Quiet Council of Krakoa. When the Krakoan Age ends, he leaves for space with Lilandra.

== Powers and abilities ==
Professor X is a mutant who possesses vast telepathic powers, and is among the strongest and most powerful telepaths in the Marvel Universe. He is able to perceive the thoughts of others or project his own thoughts within a radius of approximately 250 miles (400 km). Xavier's telepathy once covered the entire world; although following this, Magneto altered the Earth's electromagnetic field to restrict Xavier's telepathic range. While not on Earth, Xavier's natural telepathic abilities have reached across space to make universal mental contact with multiple alien races. With extreme effort, he can also greatly extend the range of his telepathy. He can learn foreign languages by reading the language centers of the brain of someone adept, and alternately "teach" languages to others in the same manner. As side effect of his telepathy, Xavier possesses an eidetic memory and his brain can assimilate and process impossibly huge amounts of raw data in an astonishingly short amount of time.

Xavier's vast psionic powers enable him to manipulate the minds of others, warp perceptions to make himself seem invisible, project mental illusions, cause loss of particular memories or total amnesia, and induce pain or temporary mental and/or physical paralysis in others. Xavier once trained a new group of mutants mentally, subjectively making them experience months of training together, while only hours passed in the real world. Within close range, he can manipulate almost any number of minds for such simple feats. However, he can only take full possession of one other mind at a time, and must strictly be within that person's physical presence. He is one of the few telepaths skilled enough to communicate with animals and even share their perceptions. He can also telepathically take away or control people's natural bodily functions and senses, such as sight, hearing, smell, taste, or even mutant powers. He has displayed telepathic prowess sufficient to confront Ego the Living Planet (while aided by Cadre K) as well as narrowly defeat Exodus. However, he cannot permanently "reprogram" human minds to believe what he might want them to believe even if he wanted to do so, explaining that the mind is an organism that would always recall the steps necessary for it to reach the present and thus 'rewrite' itself to its original setting if he tried to change it. However, his initial reprogramming of Wolverine lasted several years, despite Wolverine overcoming the reprogramming much faster than an ordinary human because of his healing factor.

He is able to project from his mind 'bolts' composed of psychic energy, enabling him to stun the mind of another person into unconsciousness, inflict mental trauma, or even cause death. These 'bolts' inflict damage only upon other minds, having a negligible effect on non-mental beings, if any. The manner in which Xavier's powers function indicates that his telepathy is physical in some way, as it can be enhanced by physical means (for example, Cerebro), but can also be disrupted by physical means (for example, Magneto's alteration of the Earth's magnetic field).

Xavier can perceive the distinct mental presence/brain waves of other superhuman mutants within a small radius of himself. To detect mutants to a wider area beyond this radius, he must amplify his powers through Cerebro and subsequently Cerebra, computer devices of his own design which are sensitive to the psychic/physical energies produced by the mind.

Professor X can project his astral form into a psychic dimension known as the astral plane. There, he can use his powers to create objects, control his surroundings, and even control and destroy the astral forms of others. He cannot project this form over long distances.

Uncanny X-Men writer Ed Brubaker has claimed that, after being de-powered by the Scarlet Witch, and then re-powered by the M'Kraan Crystal, Charles' telepathy is more powerful than was previously known. However, the extent of this enhancement is unknown. Years prior to initial publishing, Charles Xavier had an undefined level of telekinesis. This aspect of his powers were potent enough to cause catastrophic system disruption in computerized appliances. Such an attribute has faded, however. His evil counterpart Cassandra Nova Xavier would possess this ability, indicating he still possessed the potential for them. This potential was proven true after his death and resurgence within the younger, stronger body of Charlie Cluster 7. The Professor, using the moniker X, fashioned a Cerebro like a helmet which acts as a focusing device for his psionic powers and used it to galvanize latent aspects of his X-Gene to stimulate some dormant properties, seemingly using telekinesis to will a flash drive on Mystique's person into his hand.

Charles Xavier is portrayed as holding multiple doctorates. He is a famous geneticist, a leading authority on mutation, and is the inventor of Cerebro. He possesses Ph.D.s in Genetics, Biophysics, Psychology, and Anthropology, and an M.D. in Psychiatry. He is known for devising equipment for utilizing and enhancing psionic powers and for being a tactician and strategist, evaluating situations and devising swift responses.

During his travels in Asia, Xavier learned martial arts, acquiring "refined combat skills" according to Magneto. When these skills are coordinated in tandem with his telepathic abilities, Xavier is a dangerous unarmed combatant, capable of sensing the intentions of others and countering them with superhuman efficiency. He also has extensive knowledge of pressure points.

Charles Xavier was also given possession of the Mind Gem. It allows the user to boost mental power and access the thoughts and dreams of other beings. Backed by the Power Gem, it is possible to access all minds in existence simultaneously. Like all other former Illuminati members, Xavier has sworn to never use the gem and to keep its location hidden.

=== Equipment ===
Originally, Professor X used a conventional wheelchair. When Professor X ended up paraplegic again, Forge created a floating chair, called a hoverchair, using Shi'ar technology.

== Xavier Protocols ==
The Xavier Protocols are a set of doomsday plans created by Professor X. The protocols detail the best way to kill many powerful mutant characters, including the X-Men and Xavier himself, should they become too large of a danger. The Xavier Protocols are first mentioned during the Onslaught crossover and first seen in Excalibur #100 in Moira MacTaggert's lab. Charles Xavier compiled a list of the Earth's most powerful mutants and plans on how to defeat them if they become a threat to the world. They are first used after Onslaught grows too powerful. Only parts of the actual protocols are ever shown. In the Operation: Zero Tolerance crossover Bastion obtains an encrypted copy of the protocols, intending to use them against the X-Men. However, Cable infiltrates the X-Mansion and secures all encrypted files before Bastion has a chance to decrypt them. Due to the tampering of Bastion and his Sentinels, the X-Mansion computer system Cerebro gains autonomy and seeks to destroy the X-Men by employing its knowledge of the Xavier Protocols. In a virtual environment created by Professor X, Cerebro executes the Xavier Protocols against the X-Men.

Each protocol is activated by the presence of a different combination of X-Men and were written by Xavier himself :

- Code 0-0-0 (Charles Xavier) was activated by Moira MacTaggert, Cyclops, and Jean Grey. This file is both an entry on Charles Xavier, as well as an introduction to the Xavier Protocols. It contained a holographic image of Charles Xavier, reading the following message: "Moira, Scott, Jean; if you three are seeing these images, then I have become a mortal threat to my X-Men. In this instance, I must be stopped by any means necessary. Some years ago, I made a study of various forms of possible defense against my own psychic abilities. The image next to me is that of an anti-psionic armor. The wearer should be protected from my talent. When I finish speaking, a blueprint for this armor will be downloaded."
- Code 0-2-1 (Wolverine) was activated by Archangel, Cyclops, and Jean Grey.
- Code 1-3-9 (Cable) was activated by Cyclops, Jean Grey, and Cannonball.

Other X-Men who have faced their Xavier Protocols are Colossus, Rogue, Shadowcat, Nightcrawler, Storm, and Gambit.

== Reception ==
=== Accolades ===
- In 2006, BusinessWeek listed Xavier as one of the top ten most intelligent fictional characters in American comics.
- In 2014, Entertainment Weekly ranked Charles Xavier 13th in their "Let's rank every X-Man ever" list.
- In 2014, BuzzFeed ranked Charles Xavier 11th in their "95 X-Men Members Ranked From Worst To Best" list.
- In 2019, ComicBook.com ranked Charles Xavier 14th in their "50 Most Important Superheroes Ever" list.
- In 2022, The Mary Sue ranked Charles Xavier 8th in their "10 Most Powerful X-Men of All Time" list and 7th in their "8 Most Powerful Marvel Mutants" list.
- In 2022, Digital Trends ranked Charles Xavier 6th in their "Marvel’s most powerful mutants" list.
- In 2022, Screen Rant included Charles Xavier in their "10 Smartest Marvel Telepaths" list.
- In 2022, Newsarama ranked Charles Xavier 15th in their "Best X-Men members of all time" list.
- In 2022, CBR.com ranked Charles Xavier 1st in their "10 Greatest X-Men, Ranked By Experience" list.

== Sources ==
- Sanderson, Peter ( April 17, 2006). X-Men: The Ultimate Guide. DK CHILDREN (3rd ed.). ISBN 0-7566-2005-8.
- Barney-Hawke, Syd, Moreels, Eric J. ( April 1, 2003). Marvel Encyclopedia Volume 2: X-Men ISBN 0-7851-1199-9.
- Yaco, Linc, Haber, Karen (February 2004). The Science of the X-Men. I Books/Marvel. ISBN 0-7434-8725-7.
- Marvel Entertainment ( May 7, 2003). The Marvel Universe Roleplaying Game ISBN 0-7851-1028-3.
- Saunders, Ben, ed. (2023). X-Men. Penguin Classics. ISBN 978-0-14-313576-0.
