= Fabio Medina =

Fictional superhero in Marvel Comics

- Fabio as Goldballs

Publication information
- Publisher: Marvel Comics
- First appearance: Uncanny X-Men (vol. 3) #1 (April 2013)
- Created by: Brian Michael Bendis; Chris Bachalo

In-story information
- Alter ego: Fabio Medina
- Team affiliations: X-Men, The Five
- Notable aliases: Goldballs, Egg
- Abilities: Ability to project non-viable golden ball-shaped eggs from skin

Fabio Medina is a fictional superhero appearing in American comic books published by Marvel Comics. He previously went by the codename Goldballs, but has changed to Egg following changes in the X-Men during the "Dawn of X" relaunch. The character is depicted usually as a member of the X-Men or as a supporting character in stories featuring the Miles Morales version of Spider-Man.

== Fictional character biography ==
Fabio Medina is a teenaged mutant whose powers first manifest after he is attacked during an attempted robbery in San Diego. His powers frighten onlookers, resulting in him being taken into custody by the San Diego Police Department. However, Cyclops and his group of X-Men arrive just in time to rescue him. A squad of Sentinels attack Fabio and Cyclops's team, who manage to destroy the Sentinels. Fabio is invited to join the X-Men when they depart San Diego.

When S.H.I.E.L.D. agent Alison Blaire arrives and questions him about Cyclops's location, Fabio loses control of his powers. He is taken into S.H.I.E.L.D. custody but is again rescued by Cyclops' team and rejoins them. He later assists in the battle against the Blockbuster Sentinel by concentrating the emission of his gold balls to topple them.

During the "House of X and Powers of X" storyline, Fabio would make his home on the new mutant homeland of Krakoa where the true nature of his seemingly mundane mutant powers would be revealed. Combined with the abilities of Hope Summers, Elixir, Proteus, and Tempus, Fabio's eggs are used to resurrect dead mutants. After becoming a member of The Five, he changes his codename to "Egg".

During the third Hellfire Gala, Krakoa is attacked by Orchis, resulting in the Five, a portion of Krakoa, and many of its residents being transported to the White Hot Room. While the Krakoans are given the opportunity to return to Earth, the Five are not shown to have done so.

== Powers and abilities ==
Art by Chris Bachalo

Goldballs is a mutant with the superhuman ability to project golden, non-viable eggs made of a mysterious substance and of variable sizes from anywhere on his body, and which he can use as concussive weapons. Goldballs can create an infinite quantity of these balls, which can bounce, and emit a "poink" noise when they connect with something. When he concentrates, he is able to project the balls in a straight line and he can also direct them to move to a specific area.

It is later revealed that his abilities, while relatively unimpressive, have the capacity for vast genetic application. Medina's eggs, when fertilized and combined with other mutant abilities, form the basis for the mutant resurrection protocols.

== Reception ==
In a 2016 discussion on rating X-Men characters at ComicsAlliance, Goldballs received a total of 18 out of 50. Elle Collins rated the character highest (at 7 out of 10) and viewed him as "a fun character, who has really silly powers and got stuck with a nickname to match. There is absolutely a place for characters like this in the Marvel Universe, and Goldballs is a good addition as far as I'm concerned". However, the other four gave him much lower ratings with Steve Morris commenting, "I like that he opposed his own nickname, but he feels like a very panicky character, one who exists mainly so Bendis can go full-Mamet and fill up word balloon after word balloon with stammers and half-sentences. I think there's likely a fun character in there, like you say Elle, and another writer may well coax that out at some point in future. But right now he feels like a lot of potential that'll stand by in the background of crowdscenes forever more".

In 2019, Alex Abad-Santos of Vox highlighted that Medina's abilities during Uncanny X-Men are "largely played for laughs, as he was unable to control the balls he was making in the heat of battle" and that he was part of a team organized by Cyclops which was "largely forgotten". However in House of X, Jonathan Hickman's interpretation of these powers shift them to sustaining life which is "much more useful than plain gold spheres". Abad-Santos commented that "Hickman has turned Goldballs and his crew of forgotten X-Men into full-fledged characters with intriguing powers. He and his cohort, along with other forgotten mutants, have seemingly become more powerful, but not to the point where their existence breaks storytelling. To do what Hickman did with these esoteric characters offers fidelity to the larger X-Men canon". In 2020, Carter Burrowes of CBR similarly highlighted how the Krakoan Age was giving "Marvel's last generation of junior X-Men, the former students of the Jean Grey School of Higher Learning, continued meaningful roles in Marvel's wider mutant world". Burrowes stated that "from the outset, Fabio has been a very likable character, but he's often served as the butt of jokes since his ability to emit golden balls from his chest isn't the most impressive. [...] He is now one of – if not the most important member of – The Five, which makes him one of the most important mutants on Krakoa and in the Marvel Universe. It's safe to say that Fabio won't be disappearing anytime soon".
