= Moira MacTaggert =

- Moira MacTaggert, as she appeared on the variant cover of House of X #1 (July 2019). Art by Mark Brooks.

Publication information
- Publisher: Marvel Comics
- First appearance: The Uncanny X-Men #96 (December 1975)
- Created by: Chris Claremont (writer); Dave Cockrum (artist)

In-story information
- Full name: Dr. Moira Kinross "Moira X" MacTaggert
- Species: Human; Human/Sentinel cyborg (formerly); Depowered human mutant (formerly)
- Team affiliations: Muir Island X-Men; Excalibur; X-Men
- Abilities: Limited reality-warping reincarnation powers; Perfect memory; Invisibility of her true nature to mutants and mutant detection devices and methods; Genius-level intellect

Dr. Moira Kinross MacTaggert, more recently known as Moira X, is a character appearing in American comic books published by Marvel Comics. She first appeared in The Uncanny X-Men #96 (Dec. 1975) and was created by writer Chris Claremont and artist Dave Cockrum. She works as a geneticist and is an expert in mutant affairs. She is most commonly in association with the X-Men and has been a member of the Muir Island X-Men team and Excalibur.

For the first 44 years of publication, Moira was traditionally depicted in comic books as a supporting character to the X-Men and a human love interest for central character Professor Xavier. In 2019, as part of Marvel's House of X and Powers of X relaunch of X-Men comics by writer Jonathan Hickman, Moira's backstory was fundamentally changed, revealing her to be a mutant with the ability to redo her life every time she died. The story set the stage for a major status quo change for X-Men comics, including the formation of the mutant nation state of Krakoa. Later still, Moira betrays the mutant cause and becomes an antagonist to the X-Men.

Moira MacTaggert has appeared in X-Men: The Last Stand, portrayed by Olivia Williams, as well as X-Men: First Class and X-Men: Apocalypse, portrayed by Rose Byrne.

== Publication history ==
Moira MacTaggert was created by Chris Claremont and Dave Cockrum, and first appeared in Uncanny X-Men #96 (December 1975). Moira was one of the major supporting characters in Claremont's Uncanny X-Men run. She worked as a geneticist and was an expert in mutant affairs. She was romantically involved with Professor X. She would eventually found a foundation center on Muir Island centered on mutant research.

Moira MacTaggert received an entry in the Official Handbook of the Marvel Universe Update '89 #4.

Grant Morrison wanted to use Moira on their run on New X-Men as the team scientist, but she was killed prior to the start of the series causing them to use Beast instead.

Moira was one of the feature characters in the 2011 two-issue limited series Chaos War: X-Men.

She is one of the main characters in House of X and Powers of X, written by Jonathan Hickman. House of X #2 retconned established continuity, revealing her to be a mutant with the ability to reincarnate within her own timeline; on her death, she is returned to the moment she is conceived with full knowledge of her previous lives. Her knowledge of potential futures, when divulged to Professor X and Magneto, leads to the formation of the nation-state of Krakoa and the new status quo for the X-Men books following House of X and Powers of X.

== Fictional character biography ==
=== Early years ===
First appearance from Uncanny X-Men #96. Art by Dave Cockrum.

Born Moira Kinross to Scottish parents, Moira MacTaggert was one of the world's leading authorities on genetic mutation, earning her a Nobel Prize for her work. She was the longest running human associate of the X-Men and was Charles Xavier's colleague, confidante, and briefly his fiancée. Moira ended their engagement for unknown reasons and returned to Scotland. She was married to her old flame, the late politician Joseph MacTaggert which caused delays with her former engagement to Xavier: Joe proved to be abusive; Moira separated from him after he beat her into a week long coma and, as it is implied, raped her, leaving her pregnant. She kept her son's existence a secret, and when Joe refused her a divorce, she allowed people to believe she was widowed.

She eventually created a Mutant Research Centre on Muir Island, off the coast of Scotland. Moira was forced to contain and imprison her son Kevin, later called Proteus, when he developed reality warping abilities and severe psychosis. One of Moira's goals was to understand human/mutant genetics to cure her son.

Moira was a kind woman who took to helping humans and mutants alike. She rescued a young Rahne Sinclair from an angry mob and adopted her. She even attempted to treat Xavier's son, a mutant known as Legion who suffered from dissociative identity disorder. When a confused, traumatized Cable first arrived from the future, he washed up in Scotland unable to speak English, with Moira standing up for him against an angry mob. Moira taught Cable literature and the customs of the time and introduced him to Xavier. They became close friends ever since, being the first kind person Cable met in the present timeline, her later death devastating him enough to leave the X-Men.

When Magneto is reduced to infancy by Alpha the Ultimate Mutant, he is entrusted to Moira's care on Muir Island, where she alters his genetic code in an attempt to keep him from reverting to villainy.

=== Involvement with the X-Men ===
Muir Islanders (Muir Island X-Men) on the cover of The Uncanny X-Men #254. Art by Jim Lee and Dan Green.

Moira acts as a "housekeeper" for the X-Men while they are on missions. Though each of the X-Men form some sort of relationship with her, Moira and Sean Cassidy (Banshee) hit it off immediately, forming an on-and-off relationship. Proteus' escape and eventual destruction at the hands of Colossus and the X-Men leaves Moira in a position of ethical compromise again: though Banshee stops her from cloning her son, she saved his genetic structure on disk to allow herself the future option of bringing him back.

After finding out that her foster daughter, Rahne, is a mutant, Moira talks Xavier into opening his school to the New Mutants, of which Rahne is a member. Moira is an integral part of the support for the X-Men and the New Mutants, providing medical aid. Following the apparent death of the X-Men, Moira and Banshee form an alternate team based from Muir Island. She continues as the leader of the team when Banshee's duties with the X-Men call him away.

=== Captured by Magneto ===
Moira confronted by Magneto in X-Men #2. Art by Jim Lee.

Enraged when he discovered Moira had tampered with his free will, Magneto takes Moira captive and forced her to perform the procedure on half of the X-Men, turning them against their teammates. While Moira's alterations work, it is revealed that the X-Men using their powers would reverse the effects of the procedure. After returning to Earth, Moira flees from the X-Mansion, ashamed of her actions.

=== Excalibur and the Legacy Virus ===
Final moments in X-Men vol. 2 #108. Art by Leinil Francis Yu

When the Legacy Virus spreads on Genosha, Moira volunteers her services as a geneticist and is forced to watch as Genosha's residents are decimated by disease. After Illyana Rasputin dies from the virus, Moira returns to Muir Island and assists in efforts to develop a cure.

The European superhero team Excalibur takes up residence on Muir Island after assisting Moira. Moira becomes an official member of the group, acting as a medic, team mother, and morale officer. Despite not being a mutant, Moira is inexplicably infected by the Legacy Virus. Before she can die from the virus, Moira is killed by Mystique.

=== X-Men: Deadly Genesis ===
After the events of M-Day and upon the reawakening of Vulcan, significant portions of Moira's history with Xavier and the original X-Men are called into light. During the early years of Xavier's Academy, Moira founded and ran a secondary facility not far from the Xavier School, in which she had her own students. When the original X-Men were captured by Krakoa, Moira's students—Vulcan, Petra, Darwin, and Sway—were sent to rescue them, but were apparently all killed, with Xavier suppressing all memory of their existence.

=== House of X ===
In 2019's House of X, it is revealed that Moira is actually a mutant with the power of reincarnation, starting her life again in the womb after each death, possessing full memories of her prior lives. She is also revealed to be alive, having replaced herself with a Shi'ar golem that went on to die at the hands of the Brotherhood.

In her tenth and final life, Moira assists Xavier and Magneto in establishing Krakoa as a mutant nation. After Krakoa is established, Moira is hidden in the No-Place, a zone within Krakoa, in a bid to prevent her from being killed, which would reset the timeline.

Mystique and Destiny use a gun created by Forge to negate Moira's powers, preventing the timeline from being destroyed. Moira, having lost faith in the idea of a mutant nation, aims to remove the powers of all mutants so that they will no longer face discrimination. Mystique and Destiny consider killing Moira, but decide to exile her from Krakoa instead, allowing them to maintain their positions in the Quiet Council of Krakoa.

After Moira is killed by an alternate universe version of Wolverine, she is resurrected in a robotic body and begins working with Orchis, an anti-mutant organization. Moira is ultimately assimilated into Enigma, a version of Nathaniel Essex who became a godlike entity known as a Dominion. However, she is convinced to let Jean Grey kill her, stopping Enigma. Moira is resurrected for a final time in a timeline created by the Phoenix Force, stripping her of her powers and allowing her to live a normal final life.

== Powers and abilities ==
Moira is a mutant who can reincarnate, which allows her to manipulate the course of history by changing her own actions and thereby affecting people and circumstances that result from her presence. Her lifetimes have armed her with significant experience, including expertise in the fields of anthropology and genetics, firearms mastery, and leading various mutant survival movements until their eventual downfall. Telepathic intrusions on her mind will only see the memories of her current lifetime, however, telepaths can see all her lives' memories as long as she allows it.

== Reception ==
- In 2014, Entertainment Weekly ranked Moira MacTaggert 61st in their "Let's rank every X-Man ever" list.

== Other versions ==
=== Age of Apocalypse ===
An alternate universe version of Moira MacTaggert appears in "Age of Apocalypse". This version is the head of the Human High Council and wife of Bolivar Trask. With Trask, MacTaggert created the Sentinels to oppose Apocalypse.

=== Cross-Time Caper ===
An alternate universe version of Moira MacTaggert appears in Excalibur. This version is Reichsminister of Genetics and originates from a reality in which Earth is dominated by Nazis.

=== House of M ===
An alternate universe version of Moira MacTaggert appears in House of M. This version was declared a criminal for attempting to cure her son Kevin of the mutant gene and his psychosis. King Magneto's mutant supremacy saw this as an act against mutantkind, and Sentinels were dispatched to destroy Muir Island and capture MacTaggert. When the reality-hopping Exiles attract Proteus's attention, MacTaggert emerges from hiding to warn them about her son. When Kevin attacks the Exiles, MacTaggert shoots him, forcing him to find a new body. Kevin chooses to possess his mother, who kills herself rather than be used.

=== New Exiles ===
An alternate universe version of Moira MacTaggert appears in New Exiles. This version is a member of the X-Men who is known as Hypernova and is loyal to Lilandra Neramani. Additionally, she possesses the ability to generate energy blasts and is known by her maiden name Kinross.

=== Ultimate Marvel ===
An alternate universe version of Moira MacTaggert appears in the Ultimate Marvel imprint. This version runs a school/hospital for mutants and assists in the Xavier Institute from behind the scenes. The X-Men later learn that MacTaggert has been funding her hospital by producing and selling Banshee, a drug that amplifies mutant powers.

== In other media ==
=== Television ===
- Moira MacTaggert appears in X-Men: The Animated Series, initially voiced by Lally Cadeau and later by Eve Crawford. This version is the girlfriend of Banshee, an old lover of Charles Xavier's, and mother of Kevin.
  - Moira appears in X-Men '97, voiced by Martha Marion. She and Banshee are engaged and joined Genosha's ruling council before they are killed by Sentinels.

=== Film ===
- Moira MacTaggert appears in X-Men: The Last Stand, portrayed by Olivia Williams. This version is a nurse and an old colleague of Charles Xavier's. In the post-credits scene, she attends to a brain-dead patient that Xavier sends his mind to.
- A young Moira MacTaggert appears in X-Men: First Class, portrayed by Rose Byrne. This version is an American CIA agent. While investigating the Hellfire Club's activities in the 1960s, she discovers their mutant abilities and seeks out Xavier's help. She later becomes a liaison to his fledgling X-Men while they work to stop the Hellfire Club from using the Cuban Missile Crisis to cause World War III, though she inadvertently contributes to Xavier becoming paraplegic while trying to stop rogue member Magneto. Following the mission, Xavier erases her memory of them to keep his newly founded school for mutants secret and protect her from the CIA's retribution.
- Moira MacTaggert appears in X-Men: Apocalypse, portrayed again by Rose Byrne. Having maintained her interest in mutant activity through to the 1980s, she investigates a cult in Egypt that was formed upon the existence of mutants being revealed to the public, only to inadvertently reawaken Apocalypse. Upon learning of this and partially because he missed her, Xavier invites her to the X-Mansion, during which she reveals she had a son via an unnamed father, whom she later divorced. Following an attack by Apocalypse and his Horsemen, MacTaggert joins the X-Men in foiling his plans, serving as their pilot. Once Apocalypse is defeated, Xavier restores her memories and enters a relationship with her.

=== Video games ===
- Moira MacTaggert appears in X-Men Legends, voiced by Michelle Arthur.
- Moira MacTaggert appears in X-Men Legends II: Rise of Apocalypse, voiced by Jane Carr.
- Moira MacTaggert appears in Marvel Heroes, voiced by Tara Strong.

=== Miscellaneous ===
- Moira MacTaggert appears in the novelization for X-Men: The Last Stand, which depicts an alternate ending that sees her join Magneto for a game of chess.
- Moira MacTaggert appears in The Legacy Quest novel trilogy, by Steve Lyons. Exploiting her guilt, Sebastian Shaw forces her to help him find a cure for the Legacy Virus.
- Moira MacTaggert appears in the novel X-Men: Search and Rescue, by Greg Cox.
- Moira MacTaggert appears as a supporting character in the 2023 X-Men Resistance version of Zombicide.
