= Elixir (character) =

Character from the Marvel universe

- Elixir as depicted in New X-Men (vol. 2) #33 (February 2007). Art by Paco Medina.

Publication information
- Publisher: Marvel Comics
- First appearance: New Mutants (vol. 2) #5 (November 2003)
- Created by: Nunzio DeFilippis; Christina Weir; Keron Grant

In-story information
- Alter ego: Joshua "Josh" Foley
- Species: Human mutant
- Team affiliations: New Mutants training squad New X-Men; Reavers; Xavier Institute; X-Force; X-Men-In-Training; The Five
- Abilities: Biokinesis; Healing; Resurrection/immortality; Life-force manipulation; Genetic detection; Death touch

Elixir (Joshua "Josh" Foley) is a character appearing in American comic books published by Marvel Comics, primarily in association with the X-Men. Elixir is a mutant with the power of biokinesis, allowing him to manipulate biological matter in a number of ways.

Formerly a member of the Reavers, an anti-mutant criminal group, Elixir later reforms and joins the Xavier Institute after learning that he is a mutant himself. He joins the New X-Men and later joins X-Force.

During the Krakoan Age, Elixir joins the Five, using his healing abilities in combination with other mutants to resurrect the dead.

== Publication history ==
Elixir first appeared in New Mutants (vol. 2) #5 (November 2003), and was created by Nunzio DeFilippis, Christina Weir, and Keron Grant. Elixir was introduced as a member of the Reavers, joining the Xavier Institute, appearing in the remainder of the New Mutants, before appearing as a featured character in New X-Men (vol. 2).

Elixir appeared as a member of X-Force (vol. 3). During the Utopia era and Krakoan Age, he appeared in minor appearances throughout many books.

== Fictional character biography ==
Joshua Foley's powers first manifest during his time as a member of the anti-mutant group the Reavers. His powers initially go unnoticed by the other Reavers, and he uses them to save fellow mutant Laurie Collins. Outed as a mutant and thrown out of his house by his parents, Joshua reluctantly joins the Xavier Institute for Higher Learning and becomes Prodigy's roommate. His parents sign legal guardianship over to Danielle Moonstar.

A depowered Rahne Sinclair visits the X-Mansion. Joshua is instantly smitten by the new "wild child" Rahne, and sneaks out of the Institute at night to go to a bar where Rahne is playing pool. A connection is established between them as Joshua shows an immediate understanding of her inner struggle. As the two kiss, Joshua unconsciously restores Rahne's powers. She loses control and mortally wounds Joshua. With Archangel, the mansion's other healer, absent, the residents resort to electrically shocking Josh awake so that he can heal himself. As an unexpected side effect, Josh's skin and hair turn a reflective gold color. He is assigned to Danielle Moonstar's New Mutants squad and given the codename Elixir.

=== Decimation and Childhood's End ===
The events of "House of M" leave only 27 students with their powers, with Elixir being among them. Fearing their safety, Emma Frost orders the students and staff to leave the institute. However, many of the students are killed when William Stryker bombs a bus carrying them. Josh is unable to heal his dying classmates in time, and becomes severely depressed and loses confidence in his abilities. Elixir participates in a melee fight organized by Frost to join her New X-Men and makes the team. After Stryker has Laurie Collins killed, Elixir uses his powers to kill Stryker, which causes his skin to turn black.

Before the other students are teleported to Limbo, the Stepford Cuckoos help Elixir learn advanced science by giving him information taken from Beast's mind. This increases his power exponentially, allowing him to heal otherwise fatal injures with a touch. He also masters his "black abilities" by being able to switch instantly from golden/healing to black/disease-causing.

=== X-Force ===
Due to Elixir being a "problem" to X-Force, X-23 contacts the Stepford Cuckoos to help Rahne and erase Elixir's memories of the team at his request. However, before his memories can be erased, X-Force is interrupted and sent on a mission. Elixir joins X-Force and receives a dark-colored uniform. He helps his new team capture Vanisher, creating a deadly tumor in Vanisher's brain. Elixir keeps X-23 from killing herself after she becomes infected with the Legacy Virus and manages to purge the virus from her body.

=== Death and resurrection ===
Elixir joins a church group to help find himself, when he is tracked down by Sabretooth and M. While there, the group is attacked by the Dark Riders and most of the church volunteers are killed. Elixir is shot and killed by Gauntlet, but manages to resurrect himself after being buried.

After Surge and Hellion contract the Legacy Virus, Elixir cures them, but falls into a coma as a result of the strain. He is later sought out by Hrimhari when Wolfsbane collapses after a battle with Frost Giants. Upon arriving on Utopia, Hrimhari makes a deal with Hela after learning that Rahne is pregnant with his child and may not survive childbirth. Unable to choose between his lover or his child to save, Hrimhari requests Hela heal Josh so that he can save Wolfsbane and their child. Elixir heals her by transferring some of her baby's strength to her to ensure that she can survive the pregnancy.

=== Krakoan Age ===
When Professor X establishes a mutant nation on Krakoa, Elixir is revealed to be part of a group known as "The Five". Besides Elixir, the Five is made up of Egg, Proteus, Tempus, and Hope Summers, who combine their abilities to resurrect deceased mutants. During the third Hellfire Gala, Krakoa was attacked by Orchis, resulting in the Five, a portion of Krakoa, and many of its residents being transported to the White Hot Room. While the Krakoans are given the opportunity to return to Earth, the Five are not shown to have done so.

== Powers and abilities ==
Elixir is an Omega-level mutant with the ability to manipulate the structure of organic matter within his vicinity, including his own body. Besides healing, he is capable of boosting and restoring mutant abilities, and possesses a death touch that can swiftly kill others and temporarily turns his skin black. Elixir is capable of cleansing the effects of drugs and curing the Legacy Virus and M-Pox. He used his healing abilities to enable Wolfsbane to survive the birth of her and Hrimhari's child Tier. Elixir is virtually immortal due to his healing abilities enabling him to regenerate his body and resurrect himself if killed.

Elixir later develops the ability to resurrect others. Monet and Magneto speculate that he could do so to millions of people at once, but would lose his sanity in the process.

== Reception ==
Various online articles have assessed Elixir as among the most powerful X-Men members. In 2024, Screen Rant ranked Elixir among the "10 Most Underrated X-Men in Marvel History".

== In other media ==
- Elixir appears in Marvel Snap.
- Elixir appears in "The Siege of X-41" prose novel by Aconyte Books.
