= Darwin (character) =

Mutant character in the Marvel Comics Universe

- Darwin as depicted in Uncanny X-Men #478 (November 2006). Art by Billy Tan.

Publication information
- Publisher: Marvel Comics
- First appearance: X-Men: Deadly Genesis #2 (February 2006)
- Created by: Ed Brubaker (writer); Pete Woods (artist)

In-story information
- Alter ego: Armando Muñoz
- Species: Human mutant
- Team affiliations: X-Men; X-Factor Investigations
- Abilities: Reactive evolution

Darwin (Armando Muñoz) is a mutant superhero appearing in American comic books published by Marvel Comics. The character was introduced in the series X-Men: Deadly Genesis, in which he was one of several previously unseen mutants recruited to rescue the original X-Men from Krakoa. Darwin possesses the mutant ability of reactive evolution, which allows him to continuously transform his body to adapt to danger.

Edi Gathegi portrays Darwin in the film X-Men: First Class.

== Publication history ==
Darwin first appeared in X-Men: Deadly Genesis #2 (February 2006), and was created by writer Ed Brubaker and artist Pete Woods.

== Fictional character biography ==
=== Early life and Krakoa ===
After birth, Darwin's powers of self-protection and continuous circumstantial evolution made his mother hate him. The Afro-Hispanic boy was found by scientists who experimented on him, bringing him to the attention of the public. He was found by Moira MacTaggert and recruited as one of her "fosters". He was in the first team, along with Kid Vulcan, Petra, and Sway to attempt to rescue the X-Men from Krakoa.

After Petra and Sway were killed by Krakoa, Darwin absorbed their remains and then converted himself into energy to fuse with Vulcan. This gave Vulcan the powers of Darwin, Petra, and Sway. Rachel Summers managed to expel Darwin's presence from Vulcan, who then took off for space. Years later, Vulcan is brought back to the Xavier Institute and Beast detects Darwin within him, having survived in an unconscious state. Once separated from Vulcan, Darwin's abilities restore his body.

=== The Rise and Fall of the Shi'ar Empire ===
When Professor X is abducted by Shi'ar agents, Darwin pursues them by secretly entering their spacecraft. Darwin succeeds in rescuing Xavier, but is captured by Shi'ar Imperium guards. Darwin is forced to be the best man at the wedding of Vulcan and Deathbird, despite being opposed to their marriage, and attends the wedding in shackles. When the X-Men and Starjammers attack, Vulcan traps Xavier in the M'Kraan Crystal before Darwin frees him.

=== World War Hulk ===
During the World War Hulk storyline, Darwin is among the X-Men who battle the Hulk. He attempts to absorb Hulk's gamma radiation, but is unable to do so. Unable to confront Hulk directly, Darwin teleports several states away.

=== Secret Invasion ===
Sometime after Messiah Complex, Darwin searches for Professor X and encounters Longshot, who is unsure if his own powers have been working correctly. Longshot tests them out on a group of people, who turn on Darwin and attack. After a brief fight, Darwin escapes and the crowd turns on Longshot. Darwin later learns that this Longshot had been a Skrull imposter named Nogor.

=== Joining X-Factor ===
Darwin's father hires X-Factor Investigations to find him, supposedly because he feels bad for walking out on him and his mother when he was younger. After Darwin is reunited with his father, he is betrayed by him and sold to operatives of an organization known as the Karma Project. Their attempts to duplicate Darwin's powers fail when the duplicate Darwin's DNA proves incapable of handling his powers. Darwin is recruited into X-Factor, which allows him to deal with lesser threats than those faced by the X-Men.

During a battle with Hela, Darwin adapts to her touch by becoming a death god himself, but has trouble coping with his abilities. He decides to leave the team to adjust and find himself.

On his return to X-Factor in the story arc "Breaking Points", Darwin is plagued with voices in his head after touching Hela and assuming her form. These voices reveal the possible apocalypse caused by Wolfsbane's son Tier. Darwin takes it upon himself to kill Tier, but is met with resistance from Tier's guardian, Werewolf by Night.

=== Dawn of X ===
Darwin is seen living a new life in Krakoa after Professor X, Moira MacTaggert, and Magneto establish Krakoa as a mutant nation. He, Wolverine, and Synch infiltrate a Children of the Vault base inside a Master Mold, but are trapped there for centuries while only months pass in the real world. Forge rescues Wolverine and Synch while Darwin transforms into living code and continues to explore the base.

== Powers and abilities ==
Darwin has the power of "reactive evolution"; i.e., his body automatically adapts to any situation or environment he is placed in, allowing him to survive possibly anything; the exact nature and limits of his powers have not been revealed.

Examples of his powers include gaining night vision after a few seconds in the dark; functional gills after being submerged in water; fireproof skin after being exposed to flame; increasing his own intelligence; converting his body into pure energy; no longer requiring oxygen after being sucked into space; morphing into a sponge when shot at with a weapon designed to destroy the subject's nervous system; and acquiring comprehension of the Shi'ar language merely by looking at written samples. His power may concern itself with more efficient methods of survival than Darwin himself might choose; for example, instead of continually increasing Darwin's powers when taking punishment from the Hulk, his body simply teleported him away from the fight.

His power can also work when dealing with non-life-threatening situations, such as rendering it impossible for Darwin to get drunk by allowing his body to process alcohol faster than humans would normally.

== Reception ==
In 2014, Entertainment Weekly ranked Darwin 71st in their "Let's rank every X-Man ever" list, stating that he and his powers had "untapped potential".

== In other media ==
- Darwin makes a cameo appearance in the Wolverine and the X-Men episode "Future X" as a member of Professor X's future X-Men.
- Darwin appears in X-Men: First Class, portrayed by Edi Gathegi. This version initially works as a taxi cab driver before being recruited by Charles Xavier and Erik Lehnsherr to help them combat the Hellfire Club, during which he is killed by Sebastian Shaw. The character's death attracted derision from fans, critics, and Gathegi himself, all of whom feel that Darwin's powers should have enabled him to survive and that the scene served as an example of the "black guy dies first" trope. In a 2025 interview with The Hollywood Reporter, Gathegi stated that he was told that Darwin would return in a future installment.
