= Karima Shapandar =

Marvel Comics character

- Omega Sentinel. Art by Chris Bachalo.

Publication information
- Publisher: Marvel Comics
- First appearance: X-Men Unlimited #27 (June 2000)
- Created by: Chris Claremont; Brett Booth

In-story information
- Alter ego: Karima Shapandar
- Species: Human/Sentinel hybrid
- Team affiliations: Acolytes; Marauders; X-Men; Genoshan Excalibur; Prime Sentinels; Indian Police Force; Orchis
- Notable aliases: Omega Sentinel; Malice
- Abilities: Flight; Selection of unspecified weapons and mechanisms that retract into body Technoforming; Teleportation

Karima Shapandar, also known as Omega Sentinel, is a superhero appearing in American comic books published by Marvel Comics. The character is associated with the X-Men and its spinoff Excalibur.

== Publication history ==
Karima Shapandar first appeared in X-Men Unlimited #27 (June 2000) and was created by Chris Claremont and Brett Booth.

== Fictional character biography ==
=== Prime Sentinel ===
Karima Shapandar is a police officer from India who worked with Neal Shaara to find his brother Sanjit, who had gone missing while researching a series of disappearances in Kolkata. The two encounter Bastion, who attempts to transform them both into Prime Sentinels. Bastion is successful in converting Shapandar into a Prime Sentinel, but Shaara is unaffected and has his mutant powers activated by the process. Before her Sentinel programming fully takes over, Shapandar tells Shaara to escape from her.

=== Genoshan Excalibur ===
Shapandar later resurfaces on the decimated island of Genosha, where she encounters Charles Xavier and Magneto. The two disable her Sentinel programming and restore her mind, but the technological modifications to her body remain. Shapandar stays on the island with the others, working as a police officer to restore order. Some time later, Shapandar is possessed by Malice and unwillingly ends up joining the new Marauders. Shapandar recovers from being taken over by Malice, but has no memory of the events that took place, apparently a side effect of being wounded by Pixie. She goes on to join the Acolytes.

=== Fables of the Reconstruction ===
Shapandar is recruited to help deal with the damage to San Francisco done by Bastion and his forces. Arriving at the worksite for a building, Shapandar is paired with Danger and told to help excavate the site. As the day goes on, Shapandar suffers from progressively worse glitching, causing her Sentinel programming to overwhelm her. Against her will, Shapandar attacks Hellion and Hope Summers. Assessing that Hope is the biggest threat present, she punches Hellion and tells Hope to run. When her human side reasserts itself, Shapandar asks Hellion to put her out of her misery. Hellion uses his telekinesis to severely injure Shapandar, who is left comatose.

=== Orchis ===
After being possessed by Arkea and having Arkea purged from her body, Shapandar loses all of her Sentinel enhancements, leaving her fully human. Some time later, Shapandar's Sentinel programming is reactivated and she joins Orchis, an anti-mutant group seeking to prevent mutants from overtaking humanity.

== Powers and abilities ==
Karima is fitted with Omega-Prime Sentinel nanite technology which gives her superhuman strength, speed, reflexes, and endurance. She also has flight capacity, adaptive regeneration to repair any physical injury/damage she receives, and several projectile weapons, including high energy power blasts, as well as electrostatic poles built into her forearms that generate massive amounts of electrical energy and microwave radiation emitters. Her strength and durability were enhanced after she was rebuilt by the Beast. She appears to show limited technopathy and machine control, due to being able to "find" information from machines, and having the ability to control nanites in others' blood. She also has life-support technology built into her systems.

As a prerequisite to being a detective in India, Shapandar was trained in basic combat skills, identity tracking, and other fundamental skills for human detective work. She also has knowledge to operate most basic and advanced Earth-based technology.

== In other media ==
- Omega Sentinel appears as a boss and unlockable playable character in Marvel Avengers Alliance.
  - Omega Sentinel appears as a playable character in Marvel Avengers Alliance Tactics.
- Omega Sentinel appears as a playable character in Marvel Contest of Champions.
- Omega Sentinel appears in Marvel Strike Force.
- Omega Sentinel appears as a playable character in Marvel Snap.
- Omega Sentinel received a Marvel Legends figure in the 2022 "House of X and Powers of X" wave.
