= Proteus (Marvel Comics) =

Marvel Comics fictional character

- Artwork for the cover of X-Men: Legacy #233 (February 2010). Art by Adi Granov.

Publication information
- Publisher: Marvel Comics
- First appearance: The Uncanny X-Men #125 (September 1979)
- Created by: Chris Claremont; John Byrne

In-story information
- Alter ego: Kevin MacTaggert
- Species: Human mutant
- Notable aliases: Proteus; Mutant X
- Abilities: Reality warping; Body possession; Psionic energy composition

Kevin MacTaggert, also known as Proteus and Mutant X, is a character appearing in American comic books published by Marvel Comics and is commonly associated with the X-Men as an antagonist.

Kevin is the mutant son of Scottish genetic researcher Moira MacTaggert and politician Joseph MacTaggert. He possesses reality-warping and possession powers and lived most of his life in forced seclusion at his mother Moira's research facility on Muir Island. He later became a member of The Five, a group of mutants capable of resurrecting dead mutants during the Krakoan Age.

Kevin's attempt to escape Muir Island and find his father, Joseph, made up a 1979–80 Uncanny X-Men storyline that was adapted in X-Men: The Animated Series. In 2009, Proteus was ranked as IGN's 77th-greatest villain of all time.

== Publication history ==
Created by writer Chris Claremont and artist/co-writer John Byrne, Proteus first appeared in Uncanny X-Men #125 (September 1979), though hints to his character appeared in earlier issues. He was referenced off-panel in Uncanny X-Men #104, and appeared already possessing a host in Uncanny X-Men #119.

== Fictional character biography ==
Kevin MacTaggart is the son of Moira MacTaggert and Joseph MacTaggert, and was conceived after Joseph severely beat and raped his wife. Moira leaves Joseph without telling him she was pregnant and raises Kevin at her mutant research centre on Muir Island, off the coast of Scotland. Kevin eventually manifests his mutant abilities, becoming a danger to everyone around him. To protect herself and others, Moira is forced to confine Kevin in a specialized cell and refers to him only as Mutant X.

Kevin remains confined for several years until his cell is damaged in a fight between Magneto and the X-Men. He escapes by possessing the bodies of multiple locals, including Phoenix, but is unable to overcome her psychic powers. Without the esoteric energy fields of his cell to sustain him, Kevin begins to burn his body out, and so begins to possess human host bodies, one after another.

The X-Men arrive to confront Kevin, so he flees to the Scottish mainland, but is caught by Wolverine and Nightcrawler. In the ensuing fight, Kevin rejects the Mutant X label and names himself Proteus after the Greek god of myth and the cell in which he had been confined. Proteus flees to Edinburgh, where he possesses his father, Joseph, and makes a last stand against the X-Men. His host body is destroyed in the battle, but before Proteus can take another host, he is punched by Colossus, disrupting his energy form and apparently killing him. Proteus returned during the events of Necrosha, but was killed by Magneto.

Proteus is shown to be an inhabitant of Krakoa, using husks of Professor X's body as hosts. He joins forces with Elixir, Hope Summers, Egg, and Tempus as The Five, who combine their powers to resurrect dead mutants. During the third Hellfire Gala, Krakoa was attacked by Orchis, resulting in the Five, a portion of Krakoa, and many of its residents being transported to the White Hot Room. While the Krakoans are given the opportunity to return to Earth, the Five are not shown to have done so.

== Powers and abilities ==
Proteus is an Omega-level mutant who possesses a vast psionic ability to manipulate and alter reality. He exists in a state of pure psionic energy and can take possession of human bodies; however, the bodies of most beings burn out within hours or a few days. Proteus can leave a body before it is destroyed, but he usually does not. No possessed person has been shown able to resist or break free of Proteus's domination. Proteus has access to all the memories of his host while he possesses them and after he has left the body. Proteus has occasionally exhibited some telepathy, perfect recall, and the ability to mentally download computer information.

Proteus' energy form is disrupted by metal, making living beings with metal in their bodies immune to the possession. If his form is disrupted enough, it can be dispersed, essentially killing him until it is reconstituted. Because Proteus is a being made of energy, he is virtually immortal, as his consciousness can reform after being disrupted.

His reality manipulation powers allow him to transmute matter and bend the laws of physics according to his imagination within a certain range. Using this power he can transform objects into other objects or living creatures, transform energy into matter, manipulate weather, affect people's bodies, or strip a person of their powers. Proteus's reality warping ability is temporary and contingent upon line of sight: once out of his sight, any of his changes will be undone.

== Other versions ==
=== House of M ===
In the House of M reality, Proteus possesses the body of a multiverse-traveling Morph, which does not deteriorate, unlike most of his host bodies. Blink tricks Proteus into wearing a portable Behavior Modification System and brainwashes him into believing that he is Morph. Unaware of his true identity, Proteus joins the Exiles. After the Behavior Modification System is destroyed, Morph's eventually reawakens and confronts Proteus, offering him chance to work together and share his body and powers to do good. Some time later, Proteus and Morph are forcibly separated when the Exiles are absorbed into the Panoptichron.

=== Star Trek/X-Men crossover ===
Proteus' spirit appears in Star Trek/X-Men. Due to a rift created by Gary Mitchell, Proteus ends up in the Star Trek universe, where he reanimates and possesses Mitchell's corpse.

=== Ultimate Marvel ===
An alternate universe version of Proteus from Earth-1610 named David Xavier appears in Ultimate X-Men. This version is the son of Moira MacTaggert and Charles Xavier.

== In other media ==
Proteus as depicted in X-Men: The Animated Series

Proteus appears in a self-titled episode of X-Men: The Animated Series, voiced by Stuart Stone. This version is a violent, unstable, 17-year-old adolescent with a childlike mentality and little grasp on reality after being locked up at Muir Island for years. Additionally, he is able to return to human form at will and his possession abilities are not lethal. Professor X manages to stop Kevin by using his psychic powers, calming Proteus down; he returns to his human form and reconciles with his father Joseph.
