= Tempus (comics) =

- Tempus battles Thor on the cover of Thor #282. (1979)

Publication information
- Publisher: Marvel Comics
- First appearance: Giant-Size Fantastic Four #2 (August 1974)
- Created by: Gerry Conway; John Buscema

In-story information
- Team affiliations: Immortus
- Abilities: Superhuman strength and endurance Time manipulation Immortality

Tempus is the name of two characters appearing in American comic books published by Marvel Comics.

== Publication history ==
The first Tempus initially appeared in Giant-Size Fantastic Four #2 (August 1974) and was created by Gerry Conway and John Buscema. He is an enormous humanoid who dwells in Limbo and serves Immortus. An immortal creature created from the essence of Limbo, Tempus views his undying nature as a curse, and often remarks that he would consider execution a suitable reward for his services to Immortus.

The second Tempus first appeared in All-New X-Men #1 (November 2012) and was created by Brian Michael Bendis and Stuart Immonen. Eva Bell is an Australian teenager, who can create time-freezing bubbles and teleport people through time. Tempus is a new member of the Uncanny X-Men. During the Krakoan Age, Tempus took on a more prominent role as a member of the Five, a group of mutants who combine their powers to resurrect other mutants.

== Fictional character biography ==
=== Servant of Immortus ===
On his master's behalf, the first Tempus has fought many different superheroes, including the Fantastic Four and the West Coast Avengers. He was fought and defeated by Thor as part of a plot by Immortus to rob Thor of his ability to travel in time using Mjolnir.

The Destiny War is ignited when Immortus sends Tempus to kill Rick Jones on the moon. He is defeated by Kang the Conqueror, but rejuvenated by Immortus and sent to fight Hawkeye. Tempus' plan to defeat the hero by regressing him backwards through time to the point of non-existence backfires when Hawkeye regains his lost size-changing abilities, granting him enough power to defeat Tempus again.

=== Eva Bell ===
Tempus
- Tempus as depicted in Uncanny X-Men (vol. 3) #29 (February 2015). Art by Chris Bachalo.

Publication information
- Publisher: Marvel Comics
- First appearance: All-New X-Men #1 (November 2012)
- Created by: Brian Michael Bendis; Stuart Immonen

In-story information
- Team affiliations: X-Men; The Five
- Abilities: Time manipulation; Time travel; Time acceleration

Eva Bell is a goth-punk teenager from Gold Coast, Queensland. When her mutant powers manifest, Cyclops appears and asks her to join his new X-Men. She at first does not want to and prefers a normal life, but then the Avengers come to recruit her and she decides she will not have a normal life and Cyclops's team will be cooler. She then creates a time bubble that freezes the Avengers so they can escape.

Eva uses her time travel to kill Matthew Malloy, a reality-warping mutant who threatens Earth, by preventing his parents from meeting.

In House of X and Powers of X, the X-Men establish Krakoa as a mutant nation. Tempus becomes part of the Five, a group of five mutants who combine their powers to resurrect dead mutants by recreating their bodies and restoring their memories at the time of their deaths. Tempus's abilities allow her to accelerate time, aging the resurrected mutant to the age they were at death.

During the third Hellfire Gala, Krakoa was attacked by Orchis, resulting in the Five, a portion of Krakoa, and many of its residents being transported to the White Hot Room. While the Krakoans are given the opportunity to return to Earth, the Five are not shown to have done so.

== Powers and abilities ==
Both versions of Tempus are able to manipulate time. The first Tempus possesses immense strength, allowing him to trade blows with Thor and the alien monster Alioth. His body is composed of the essence of Limbo, which Immortus can control and use to summon an army of trillions. Eva Bell is able to accelerate and slow down time, freezing others in place with time bubbles.
