= Krakoa =

Fictional living island appearing in Marvel Comics

- Krakoa as depicted in Wolverine #6 (2020) by artist Viktor Bogdanovic

Publication information
- Publisher: Marvel Comics
- First appearance: Giant-Size X-Men #1 (May 1975)
- Created by: Len Wein; Dave Cockrum

In-story information
- Species: Living island
- Team affiliations: X-Men; Quiet Council of Krakoa
- Notable aliases: The Living Island; The Island That Walks Like a Man
- Abilities: Energy draining; Lifeform creation; Outer space survival; Telepathic immunity

Krakoa is a fictional living island appearing in American comic books published by Marvel Comics, typically in storylines featuring the X-Men. It first appeared in Giant-Size X-Men #1 (May 1975) and was created by writer Len Wein and artist Dave Cockrum. While often depicted as an antagonist, Krakoa later featured as having grown into a sentient habitat for the mutant nation that shared its name during the "Krakoan Age" storylines that ran from 2019 to 2024.

== Publication history ==
On its first appearance in Giant-Size X-Men #1 (1975), Krakoa is introduced as the Pacific island setting where a previous team of X-Men have gone missing while investigating strong readings from Cerebro, a device with the ability to detect mutants. Its name recalls that of Krakatoa, a volcanic island in Indonesia which erupted in 1883. Charles Xavier recruits a new, international team to rescue them. On their arrival on Krakoa, they are attacked by the flora, fauna, and very ground of the island, until finally Angel—one of the original X-Men they are rescuing—warns them that "the island itself" is the powerful mutant which Cerebro had detected. That is, the entire island of Krakoa had become a single monstrous mutant, similar to the Aspidochelone of legend. It needs the mutants in order to leech their life-energy. Both teams escape as Krakoa is ripped from the ocean bed, hurled into space, and apparently dies. While the issue would be celebrated for revitalizing the X-Men, the character / setting of Krakoa was revived only very sporadically until Jonathan Hickman's 2019 X-Men storyline. "House of X and Powers of X". In those miniseries (which established the premise of the X-Men comics going forward), the mutants have established communication with Krakoa and agreed to live on it in a symbiotic relationship, establishing the island as an independent mutant nation-state.

The grandchild of Krakoa, Krakoa III, acted as the school grounds for the Jean Grey School for Higher Learning in the Wolverine and the X-Men series.

== Fictional character biography ==
=== Origin ===
In its original depiction, Krakoa was a small island in the Pacific Ocean near nuclear bombing tests, which mutated it into a hive-mind entity. Nick Fury and his commando team were accidental witnesses to the bomb drop which created Krakoa in early 1945, and soon afterwards crashed on and encountered the island's collective intelligence, with whom they arranged a peaceful parting in exchange for keeping its existence a secret.

In the Krakoan Age, Krakoa is retroactively established to have been half of a larger land mass known as Okkara, alongside Arakko. In the distant past, Okkara was attacked by Annihilation and split in two by Annihilation's sword. Arakko and its inhabitants were sealed in Amenth by Apocalypse until he could build an army to fend off the Daemon hordes, while Krakoa remained on Earth.

=== Encounter with the X-Men ===
Krakoa becomes hungry for the unique life energy created by mutants and captures the original X-Men (Cyclops, Angel, Havok, Iceman, Jean Grey, and Polaris). Petra, Sway, Darwin, and Kid Vulcan are sent to rescue the X-Men, but Krakoa kills Petra and Sway, while Darwin and Kid Vulcan are trapped within Krakoa. A second team is then assembled, consisting of Colossus, Nightcrawler, Storm, Sunfire, Thunderbird, Banshee, and Wolverine. The new X-Men team rescue the original X-Men from Krakoa, with Polaris launching Krakoa into outer space.

=== Krakoa III ===
A spawn of Krakoa was created and brutally raised by Maximilian Frankenstein and planted on the grounds of the Jean Grey School for Higher Learning by the Hellfire Club. It attacked the school but was calmed by Kid Omega and Marvel Girl and happily existed alongside the X-Men as the school grounds.

=== Krakoan Age ===
The House of X and Powers of X storyline transformed Krakoa into a sovereign nation state for the entire mutant race. The Krakoan "Habitat" structures are self-sustained environments which function as an extension of Krakoa's consciousness. While the main body of Krakoa is situated in the Pacific Ocean, parts of it exist off the coast of Africa in the mid-Atlantic Ocean, located south of the Azores and west of the Canary Islands.

Krakoa's habitats are connected by Gateways that allow instantaneous travel and are only usable by mutants. If a mutant brought a human with them voluntarily, that human needed Krakoa's permission to use the gateway. During the Krakoan Age, Krakoa expanded to the Blue Area of the Moon, the Green Area on Mars, and beyond the solar system. Some of these structures serve as embassies around several countries on Earth. Various pharmaceuticals are produced from flowers grown on Krakoa, such as special pills that extend human life by five years, a "universal" antibiotic, and a cure for mental disease – these pharmaceuticals were only available to nations that recognized Krakoa's sovereignty. Krakoan as a national language was introduced in this era; Jonathan Hickman described it as "mutantdom's first autochthonous language" created by Cypher. He noted that it "is a manufactured language and is not the native language of Krakoa the living mutant island. The language of Krakoa is untranslatable, and almost any human/mutant brains are incapable of comprehending it", with Cypher as the "only known exception".

During the third Hellfire Gala (July 2023), Krakoa is attacked by Orchis; the mutants present are forced through Gateways and initially thought to be lost. The group, along with Krakoa's Atlantic portion, are transported to the White Hot Room, allowing them to rebuild before some of them return to Earth to stop Orchis. X-Men #35 (June 2024), legacy Uncanny X-Men #700, marked the end of the Krakoan Age with a brief opening to the White Hot Room. Fifteen years had passed for the mutants within, who flourished alongside the Atlantic Krakoa. After briefly visiting Earth, the Atlantic Krakoa reunites with the main Krakoa, who returns to the White Hot Room.

=== From the Ashes ===
In Invincible Iron Man (vol. 4) #20, Tony Stark fulfills Emma Frost's request for a Krakoan mutant memorial. With Ironheart's help, they craft the memorial "out of an abandoned Krakoan gate in Manhattan, with the inscription: 'Dedicated to Those Who Paid the Ultimate Price to Fight Fascism'". In NYX (vol. 2), Prodigy teaches a class titled "Examinations of Post-Krakoan Diaspora" at Empire State University, with Kamala Khan and Sophie Cuckoo as students.

== Quiet Council of Krakoa ==
The Quiet Council of Krakoa is a fictional council of mutant superheroes and supervillains which governed mutantkind during the Krakoan Age. The twelve-member governing body was divided up into four sections (with three seats each) along with an adjunct section.

== Powers and abilities ==
In its original depiction, Krakoa was an immensely powerful being. It could manipulate its flora and fauna at will and possessed incredible psi powers, rivaling those of Professor X. Indeed, it was capable of subtly manipulating his mind from a great distance to prevent him contacting experienced heroes for help.

After the revelation of the events surrounding Vulcan, it was revealed that Krakoa was little more than an animal-like system whose intelligence was merely survival instinct.

== Reception ==
In 2020, CBR.com ranked Krakoa 3rd in their "10 Most Powerful Fictional Nations In the Marvel Universe" list. In 2021, Screen Rant included Krakoa in their "10 Most Important Fictional Marvel Comics Countries" list.

Academic Brett Butler in the Journal of Science Fiction viewed Krakoa as "an integral part of the narrative" during the Krakoan Age, commenting that while "Xavier has established the mutant society on Krakoa, the island itself actually controls all of the major aspects of that society". Butler highlighted that "Hickman and other writers show how mutants declare independence through exclusive trade, create laws and punishment, establish mass transit routes, identify a national language, and negotiate property rights—none of which would be possible without the island of Krakoa providing the means and/or permitting them to do so". Readers have been divided as to whether the storyline is intended as an extended allegory for the state of Israel.

== Other versions ==
- In the Ultimate Marvel reality, Krakoa is featured in issues of Ultimate X-Men. Krakoa Island is south of Genosha (which in this reality is vastly anti-mutant under the reign of Lord Scheele) and the filming location for Mojo Adams' reality TV series.
- In What If?: Deadly Genesis, Vulcan's trip to Krakoa saw him kill the rest of the X-Men by accident before Krakoa was jettisoned into deep space.

== In other media ==
Krakoa appears as a map in Marvel Rivals.
