= Raza Longknife =

Raza
- Raza Longknife. Art by Billy Tan.

Publication information
- Publisher: Marvel Comics
- First appearance: The X-Men #107 (Oct. 1977)
- Created by: Dave Cockrum

In-story information
- Alter ego: Raza Longknife
- Species: Extraterrestrial cyborg
- Team affiliations: Starjammers
- Notable aliases: ZZZXX
- Abilities: Superhuman strength, enhanced agility, speed, reflexes Skilled hand-to-hand combatant.

Raza Longknife is a fictional character appearing in American comic books published by Marvel Comics. The character is usually seen in the X-Men series and various spin-offs. He is the last known surviving member of his unnamed alien race (which chose to die en masse in one final battle against the Shi'ar empire as the culmination of their warrior culture), and a member of the Starjammers.

== Publication history ==
Dave Cockrum created the Starjammers with the intent of having them star in their own series. However, when he submitted the concept for Marvel's two try-out series, Marvel Spotlight and Marvel Premiere, he was repeatedly informed that these series were booked for two years solid. Running out of patience, Cockrum showed the Starjammers to X-Men writer Chris Claremont, and convinced him to use the characters for this series.

== Fictional character biography ==
While imprisoned on Alisbar, Raza Longknife (his last name is an English translation of his true last name) met and formed the band of smugglers and space pirates known as the Starjammers; with Corsair, Hepzibah, and Ch'od, and associated himself with the group. He is a cyborg, being partly living flesh and partly machine. Because Raza speaks an archaic dialect of his native language, his words are translated into an equally archaic form of English. Raza is the last surviving member of his species, who were killed in combat against the Shi'ar.

With the Starjammers, Raza comes to the aid of the X-Men against D'Ken's Imperial Guard. With the Starjammers, he aids the New Mutants in combat against Magus. Alongside Binary, Raza seeks the "map-rod" holding information on the location of the "Phalkon" power source, which is later revealed to be the Phoenix. With the Starjammers, he aids in a rebellion against Deathbird on a Shi'ar border world.

Alongside Hepzibah and Ch'od, Raza battles Wonder Man during the Kree/Shi'ar War while escorting a Shi'ar nega-bomb to the Kree. With Hepzibah, Raza accepts an assignment from a former Kree admiral to kill Black Knight in hopes of being reunited with his son. With the Starjammers, Raza visits the Avengers and Binary on Earth, and seriously injures Black Knight in combat. Raza then battles Hercules, but is defeated by Vision. Raza confides in Binary, who reconciles him with the Avengers.

Raza is deeply affected when Vulcan kills Corsair. He has also dealt with Hepzibah being stranded on Earth although several X-Men have remained with the Starjammers.

In the "X-Men: Kingbreaker" miniseries, Raza becomes the reluctant host of the alien symbiote ZZZXX. The symbiote-controlled Raza joins Emperor Vulcan's Imperial Guard. In the concluding events of "War of Kings", Raza is incapacitated by the Nova Corps and has the symbiote removed.

== Powers and abilities ==
Raza has been converted into a cyborg, with various bionic body parts, including his left eye, his left arm and hand, and much of his face and thorax. This gives him superhuman strength, enhanced agility, speed, and reflexes thanks to his robotic parts. Raza's cyborg body contains computers that he can utilize for various tasks. Raza can convert his bionic left hand into a bladed weapon at will. His cyborg body contains advanced sensor systems and atmosphere processing systems that enable him to breathe in various alien environments. He is a skilled hand-to-hand combatant, trained in various forms of combat known in the Shi'ar galaxy. He is a brilliant swordsman and marksman, with various forms of Shi'ar weaponry. He wears battle armor of unspecified composition, and uses Shi'ar knives, swords, and energy guns.

== Other versions ==
In Age of Apocalypse, Raza Longknife appears as a member of the Starjammers, which are led by Deathbird.

== In other media ==
Raza Longknife makes non-speaking appearances in X-Men: The Animated Series as a member of the Starjammers.
