= Sidri =

Publication information
- Publisher: Marvel Comics
- First appearance: Uncanny X-Men #154 (February 1982)
- Created by: Chris Claremont; Dave Cockrum

Characteristics
- Place of origin: Shi'ar galaxy
- Inherent abilities: Ability to survive in the vacuum of deep space Cold resistance Energy projection Armor generation Faster-than-light flight

The Sidri, also known as Sidrian Hunters, are an alien species appearing in American comic books published by Marvel Comics. They are depicted as adversaries of the X-Men. Created by writer Chris Claremont and artist Dave Cockrum, they first appeared in Uncanny X-Men #154 (February 1982).

== Physical characteristics and abilities ==
The Sidri look roughly like giant beetles, crabs or sting rays. The dorsal portion of their bodies resembles a shell and is dark purple. The underbelly is yellow. Sidri have six limbs, with four on the sides of their bodies and two near the front of the underbelly. Each Sidri has a single, large, red eye.

The Sidri live in colonies and are so closely linked that they can combine into a "ship matrix", a gestalt being resembling a manta ray that is capable of flying at faster-than-light speeds and surviving in space.

The Sidri are an adaptive bio-mechanical species. They can project force blasts or other forms of energy from their visor-like aperture and generate natural body armor.

== Fictional species biography ==
The Sidri first encounter the X-Men when a group of Sidri bounty hunters follow Corsair to the X-Mansion. The Sidri attack Corsair, Cyclops, and Storm and destroy the mansion. The Sidri ship matrix pursue the trio, who had escaped in the Blackbird jet. Corsair kills the Sidri by igniting a petroleum storage facility.

Later, Kitty Pryde is attacked by a group of Sidri in a maintenance tunnel of the reconstructed X-Mansion's sub-basement. The sub-basement had survived the attack, and several Sidri had hid there to lay eggs. Colossus and Lockheed come to Kitty's aid, and the three defeat the Sidri. Lockheed destroys thousands of Sidri eggs by burning and eating them.

An all-female team of X-Men consisting of Jubilation Lee, Rachel Summers, Monet St. Croix, Ororo Munroe, and Betsy Braddock end up in a confrontation with an enclave of Sidri hunters while caring for Deathbird.

A group of Sidri infest Ego the Living Planet. Ego attempts to get help, but everyone he finds refuses, fearing his power. Ego then calls Nova, who destroys the Sidri by pushing an asteroid onto Ego's surface.

A group of Sidri hatchlings secretly take over the now-abandoned X-Mansion, where they surprise and capture Lady Mastermind when she comes looking for a portal to the X-Men's new domicile on Krakoa. Cypher establishes a rapport with the Sidri, allowing them to guard the portal and freeing Lady Mastermind peacefully.
