= X-Men: Kingbreaker =

2008–09 comic book miniseries by Marvel Comics

- Cover of X-Men: Kingbreaker 1 (Feb, 2009), art by Brandon Peterson

Publication information
- Publisher: Marvel Comics
- Schedule: Monthly
- Format: Mini-series
- Genre: Science fiction, superhero
- Publication date: February – May 2009
- No. of issues: 4
- Main character(s): Starjammers; Shi'ar

Creative team
- Written by: Christopher Yost
- Penciller: Dustin Weaver
- Inker: Jaime Mendoza
- Letterer: Joe Caramagna
- Colorist: Nathan Fairbairn
- Editor(s): Daniel Ketchum; Nick Lowe; Joe Quesada

Collected editions
- Road to War of Kings: ISBN 0-7851-3967-2

X-Men: Kingbreaker is a four-issue comic book mini-series starring the Starjammers and published by Marvel Comics. Taking place in Marvel's main shared universe, the Marvel Universe, the series was written by Christopher Yost, with pencils by Dustin Weaver. It was announced at the Fan Expo 2008. It began in December 2008 and ended in March 2009 (on sale dates).

== Premise ==
The story features the Starjammers and the Shi'ar and is set immediately after the conclusion of the mini-series Emperor Vulcan. Vulcan has set his sight on conquering the rest of the universe in the name of the Shi'ar empire. The series follows his expansionist plans and attempts by the Starjammers, Havok, Rachel Summers, Lilandra Neramani, Korvus, and others to stop him. Failing in their attempts, they flee to enlist the aid of the Kree. The events narrated in the comic book served as a lead to War of Kings, in March 2009.

== Collected editions ==
The series was collected in a trade paperback:

- War of Kings: Road to War of Kings (collects X-Men: Kingbreaker #1-4, Secret Invasion: War of Kings and War of Kings Saga, 176 pages, June 2009, ISBN 0-7851-3967-2)
