= Hepzibah (character) =

- Hepzibah as depicted in Uncanny X-Men #487 (August 2007). Art by Salvador Larroca.

Publication information
- Publisher: Marvel Comics
- First appearance: The X-Men #107 (October 1977)
- Created by: Dave Cockrum (concept and artwork); Chris Claremont (writer)

In-story information
- Alter ego: Unknown (Unpronounceable)
- Species: Mephitisoid
- Team affiliations: Starjammers; X-Force; X-Men
- Notable aliases: Lady Kitten; Cat-Lady; Zee
- Abilities: Superhuman speed, agility, senses, and reflexes; Pheromone manipulation; Retractable claws; Night vision

Hepzibah is a character appearing in American comic books published by Marvel Comics. Created by Dave Cockrum and Chris Claremont, the character first appeared in X-Men #107 (October 1977). Hepzibah belongs to the alien species called Mephitisoid. The character has also been a member of the X-Men and the Starjammers at various points in her history.

== Publication history ==
Hepzibah debuted in The X-Men #107 (October 1977), created by Dave Cockrum and Chris Claremont. She appeared in the 2014 Cyclops series. She appeared in the 2022 Captain Marvel Annual series.

== Fictional character biography ==
Hepzibah is a Mephitisoid from the planet Tryl'sart, located in the Shi'ar empire. She is imprisoned by Shi'ar emperor D'Ken, but is rescued by Corsair alongside Raza Longknife and Ch'od. After escaping the Alzibar prison, the four form the Starjammers. Corsair gives Hepzibah her name after the skunk character Mam'selle Hepzibah from Pogo, because her real name consists of a series of scents that are impossible to reproduce in spoken language.

Hepzibah and the Starjammers work with the X-Men on multiple occasions. The first time, the Starjammers came to the aid of the X-Men against D'Ken's Imperial Guard.

After Corsair reunites with his son Havok, and the Starjammers participated in a conflict between Lilandra Neramani's and D'Ken's forces, Corsair is killed by his son Vulcan. Hepzibah attempts to attack Vulcan, but is separated from the Starjammers and stranded on Earth. Since she is stuck on Earth and has nowhere else to go, Hepzibah joins the X-Men.

Hepzibah works with Warpath to rescue Leech, who was kidnapped by the Morlocks. The subterranean environment of the Morlock tunnels triggers Hepzibah's instincts, causing her to go into heat as she is now single after the death of Corsair, her previous mate. After the conflict with the Morlocks, Hepzibah speaks with Cyclops at the X-Mansion, where he accepts her having chosen Warpath as her new mate.

Hepzibah is seen again much later in space, where she has been reunited with a mysteriously resurrected Corsair, and the two of them are on vacation with Cyclops' time-displaced younger self. Corsair later reveals to Scott that Hepzibah was responsible for his resurrection by convincing the rest of the Starjammers to take his corpse to an alien planet where he was brought back to life. However, the process converts Corsair into a cyborg who must regularly ingest pills containing nanomachines to remain alive.

== Characteristics ==
=== Appearance ===
As a Mephitisoid, Hepzibah resembles a humanoid skunk. Some artists have given her a more cat-like appearance, making her tail smaller and her fur entirely white. In her modern appearances, Hepzibah's ears are closer in appearance to those of a skunk, being rounded and on the sides of her head. In earlier appearances, Hepzibah's ears were closer to a cat, being pointed and on the top of her head.

=== Powers and abilities ===
Hepzibah possesses superhuman attributes, such as superhuman speed, agility, and senses. She also possesses night vision, retractable claws, and the ability to emit pheromones at will to control others.

Additionally, Hepzibah is a natural athlete and acrobat. She is a skilled hand-to-hand combatant, trained in various forms of armed and unarmed combat known in the Shi'ar galaxy. She is an expert marksman, and is knowledgeable in the operation of a wide variety of ship-sized weaponry. Hepzibah is often armed with Shi'ar energy guns.

== Reception ==
=== Critical response ===
Deirdre Kaye of Scary Mommy called Hepzibah a "role model" and a "truly heroic" female character. Steve Morris of ComicsAlliance said "This space-skunk, as some ingrates sometimes refer to her, may seem to be, basically, a madwoman --- but no, that madness is carefully constructed and part of her absolutely earned self-confidence. Although absolutely never to be parted from her #1 man Corsair, this space pirate races into battle filled with passion, rage, and clawed fury. She's an unstoppable, overwhelming force of adrenaline, smart and calculating, and better than anyone you'd ever find on Earth. What a woman." Darren Franich of Entertainment Weekly ranked Hepzibah 57th in their "Let's Rank Every X-Man Ever" list.

== In other media ==
Hepzibah appears in X-Men: The Animated Series, voiced by an uncredited actress. This version is a member of the Starjammers.
