= Deathcry =

Comic book character

Publication information
- Publisher: Marvel Comics
- First appearance: Avengers #363 (June 1993)
- Created by: Bob Harras (writer); Steve Epting (artist)

In-story information
- Alter ego: Sharra Neramani
- Species: Shi'ar
- Team affiliations: Avengers
- Notable aliases: Lifecry
- Abilities: Superhuman strength, stamina, agility, durability, and reflexes; Cosmic awareness; Sharp talons; Skilled aircraft pilot

Deathcry (Sharra Neramani) is a fictional character appearing in American comic books published by Marvel Comics. The character has been depicted as a former honorary member of the Avengers and later revealed to be the niece of Lilandra Neramani through an as-yet-unidentified mother.

== Publication history ==
Deathcry first appeared in Avengers #363 (June 1993) and was created by writer Bob Harras and penciller Steve Epting.

Deathcry was one of the feature characters in the 2011 three-issue limited series Chaos War: Dead Avengers created by scenarist Fred Van Lente and penciller Tom Grummet. In an interview with Comic Book Resources, Fred Van Lente explained "Deathcry was a character who I knew nothing about until we started talking in the room about who we could use in the series. She was terrific in Annihilation: Conquest, and that's definitely the incarnation of the character I'm going to be using. To me, her real name should be "The '90s" because she's the classic stereotypical bad girl with cleavage and a shitty attitude. She's a Shi'Ar who may or may not be descended from the X-Men villain Deathbird. So she's a female, berserker, bird person with crazy hair, which means she's awesome."

Deathcry has entries in the All-New Official Handbook of the Marvel Universe A to Z (2006) #3 - Copperhead to Ethan Edwards, The Marvel Encyclopedia and Official Handbook of the Marvel Universe A to Z (2008) HC vol. 03 - Captain (Nextwave) to Elements of Doom.

== Fictional character biography ==
Deathcry is a Shi'ar whose true name was taken by royal decree for reasons yet unrevealed, but it was heavily hinted that she was the daughter of Deathbird. When the Earth hero team Avengers defeated the Kree, the Empress Lilandra Neramani feared for the team's safety should the Kree attempt revenge.

Lilandra then orders Deathcry, by the same decree that took her name, to join the Avengers as their protector. Deathcry served with the Avengers for several months while hiding her youth (being the equivalent of a teenager). She eventually softened and revealed her true age as she formed close friendships with her teammates Vision and Hercules.

Later, after the Avengers survive an attack by the villain Immortus, Deathcry decides her services are no longer required. She bade Hercules to return her to the Shi'ar Empire, where she remained.

Eventually finding herself in the Kree empire, Deathcry is captured and charged with multiple murders. She was kept in a Kree high-security prison. She is selected to join Peter Quill's 'dirty dozen' team to fight the Phalanx. Unfortunately, her throwback-Shi'ar nature (and berserker rage she may have inherited from her likely-mother Deathbird) causes her to be hostile to Captain Universe when the man kills two of her opponents. Believing that taking another person's kill is an insult to that person, she attacks Captain Universe who raises an energy ball in self-defense. Deathcry hits this ball and explodes.

During the Chaos War storyline, Deathcry is among the dead individuals who return from the dead following Amatsu-Mikaboshi's victory in the death realms. It was revealed that her true name is Sharra Neramani, the niece of Lilandra and apparently the daughter of Deathbird as was previously implied. Lilandra had stripped Sharra of her name and assigned her to protecting the Avengers on Earth after she killed a member of her own platoon in a drunken rage over a mutual lover. It is not revealed if Deathcry remained alive after the events of Chaos War.

== Powers and abilities ==
Deathcry possesses super-strength, stamina, sturdiness, sharp talons, and enhanced senses.

== Reception ==
=== Accolades ===
- In 2017, Newsarama ranked Deathcry 1st in their "10 Worst Avengers Members Of All Time" list.
- In 2020, Scary Mommy included Deathcry in their "Looking For A Role Model? These 195+ Marvel Female Characters Are Truly Heroic" list.

Newsarama ranked Deathcry as the worst Avengers member commenting that "Deathcry forced her way onto the team, where she became close friend with Hercules and the Vision, who were able to overlook her cripplingly stupid code name and ridiculous tattoos."
