= Vulcan (Marvel Comics) =

Character in Marvel Comics

- Textless cover of Uncanny X-Men #477 (August 2, 2006). Art by John Watson.

Publication information
- Publisher: Marvel Comics
- First appearance: X-Men: Deadly Genesis #1 (January 2006)
- Created by: Ed Brubaker (writer); Trevor Hairsine (artist)

In-story information
- Alter ego: Gabriel Summers
- Species: Human mutant
- Team affiliations: Shi'ar Imperium; X-Men
- Notable aliases: Emperor Vulcan
- Abilities: Vast energy absorption, manipulation, transformation and projection; Flight; Force field projection and manipulation; Life support and limited regeneration; Variable energy blasts; Limited super power replication and repression; Geokinesis and chronokinesis; Energy siphon and disruption; Psionic resistance

Vulcan (Gabriel Summers) is a fictional character appearing in American comic books published by Marvel Comics. He first appeared in X-Men: Deadly Genesis #1 (January 2006). He is the third Summers brother to be revealed, the younger brother of X-Men characters Cyclops and Havok.

== Publication history ==
Though a third Summers brother was mentioned years before by Sinister during an encounter with Cyclops, Vulcan first appeared in X-Men: Deadly Genesis #1, a story written by Ed Brubaker that ran from January to July 2006. Vulcan then appeared in "The Rise and Fall of the Shi'ar Empire" storyline, also written by Brubaker, in The Uncanny X-Men issues #475 to 486 (September 2006 to July 2007).

After Brubaker left The Uncanny X-Men, Christopher Yost took over as writer beginning with the X-Men: Emperor Vulcan mini-series, which ran from November 2007 to March 2008.

In July, 2008, Marvel.com posted a news article of an alternate cover of Emperor Vulcan featuring the phrase "Who Will Rule?", accompanied by the text "Stay tuned to Marvel.com and get ready for the blockbuster answer at San Diego Comic-Con!". This was all to build up to the "War of Kings" storyline, and Vulcan's part of the story is set up in the Kingbreaker mini-series, written by Yost.

== Fictional character biography ==
=== Origins ===
Vulcan's infant body is aged to adolescence through the Shi'ar incubation-accelerator. Art by Trevor Hairsine.

Vulcan is the unborn child of Christopher Summers (later known as Corsair) and Katherine Summers, parents of Cyclops and Havok. After D'Ken, Majestor of the Shi'ar, kills Katherine, Gabriel is taken from her body and placed in an incubator so he can fully mature.

While being sent to Earth to serve Erik the Red, Gabriel escapes and is found by Moira MacTaggert, who adopts him and helps him master his powers. Subsequently, he joins Petra, Darwin, and Sway in a mission to rescue the original X-Men from the sentient island Krakoa. However, Krakoa kills Petra and Sway and leaves Vulcan and Darwin for dead.

=== Deadly Genesis ===
Reawakened in modern times by the mutant energy released during M-Day, Vulcan returns to Earth to seek revenge against Charles Xavier, killing Banshee in the process and kidnapping Rachel Summers and Cyclops.

Vulcan subconsciously uses the absorbed powers of Petra and Sway to manipulate the X-Men, and figures out the truth of the mystery behind the missing team of X-Men that were lost on Krakoa. Vulcan is able to lure Professor Xavier out of hiding, and confronts him in front of the X-Men, wanting the Professor to reveal to them all what really happened to Vulcan and his team. However, Xavier is unable to do so, because, in the wake of M-Day, he is no longer a mutant. Enraged, Vulcan commands Marvel Girl to link their minds so that everyone can see what transpired. Reluctantly, Rachel does so, and with Xavier as a guide, she is able to not only reveal the truth behind what really happened on Krakoa, but she also detects another consciousness within the mind of Vulcan.

It is revealed that, following the death of Petra and Sway, Darwin transformed himself into energy and bonded with Vulcan, thus saving them both. The two entered a state of suspended animation after Polaris launched Krakoa into space. Cyclops returned to Professor Xavier in a hysterical state, blaming himself for the deaths of the team, and Xavier used his psychic powers to erase all knowledge of their existence.

Vulcan remained on Krakoa, inert, until the massive backlash of power resulting from M-Day awakened him, whereupon he returned to Earth to confront the X-Men, revealing the truth behind the Krakoa incident to them. With these revelations, Marvel Girl reaches into Vulcan's mind and releases Darwin from his body. Using this opportunity, the X-Men attack him as they deem him too dangerous to be left alone. Vulcan easily repels their attack and flees the planet, renouncing Cyclops as his brother, and heads for space, bent on revenge.

=== The Rise and Fall of the Shi'ar Empire ===
Vulcan with Deathbird, D'Ken, and the Shi'ar. Cover to The Uncanny X-Men#483, by John Watson.

While traveling through Shi'ar space, he learns from a crew member whose starship he had destroyed that D'Ken has been comatose for years after his experience in the M'Kraan Crystal and that Lilandra Neramani is the current ruler of the Shi'ar. Undaunted, Vulcan continues on his quest for vengeance by engaging a trio of Shi'ar warships, and destroying two of them, thereby showing his superiority to the crew of the surviving third ship, which Vulcan then commandeers for his own. After reaching the inner territory of the Shi'ar throneworld, Chandilar, the ship is confronted and ordered to surrender by the Imperial Guard. However, the captain of Vulcan's ship had deceived Vulcan as to the Guard's true strength, hoping to use him as a pawn in Vice-Chancellor K'Tor's plan to restore the old Empire; as a result, Vulcan is unprepared for the true power of the Guard, and especially their leader, Gladiator.

Vulcan kills several powerful guardsmen in combat (Neutron, Cosmo, Smasher, and Impulse, among possible others), but is defeated by Gladiator, and taken to a prison moon. He remains a prisoner there until an agent of the Vice-Chancellor frees him from his shackles, and directs him to another cell to free Deathbird.

However, soon afterwards, Deathbird manages to convince him to at least delay his plan for vengeance, after the two become romantically involved. Vulcan then uses his powers to heal D'Ken's injuries. Afterwards, a grateful D'Ken asks Vulcan to marry Deathbird. After his wedding, Vulcan throws Professor Xavier into the M'Kraan Crystal, kills D'Ken, and names himself Emperor of the Shi'ar. Darwin leaps into the Crystal after Xavier, and soon after emerges with him. During the battle Vulcan kills Corsair, claiming he does not have a father and blaming Corsair for letting his mother die. Xavier, Nightcrawler, Warpath, Darwin, and Hepzibah, are sent back to Earth. Meanwhile, Havok, Marvel Girl, Polaris, Ch'od, Raza, and Korvus form a new team of Starjammers bent on defeating Vulcan and salvaging the remains of the Shi'ar empire.

=== Emperor Vulcan ===
During his conflict with the Starjammers, Vulcan learns of the existence of the Scy'ar Tal, a race who were once called the M'Kraan and originally discovered the M'Kraan Crystal. The Shi'ar killed many of the Scy'ar Tal and took the M'kraan Crystal as their own, while the M'Kraan changed their name to Scy'ar Tal (meaning "Death to the Shi'ar") and devoted themselves to destroying the Shi'ar. It is later revealed that the Scy'ar Tal discovered the M'Kraan Crystal 13,000 years prior and eradicated the then-inhabiting species on the planet, the same fate that would later befall them.

Vulcan makes contact with the Starjammers to call a temporary ceasefire. The Eldest Scy'ar tries to stop them, but Vulcan, discovering the source of the Eldest's power, severs the connection between the Eldest and his brothers, rendering the Eldest powerless and the Scy'ar disorganized. Vulcan decides to destroy the Scy'ar by using the weapon to place a star in the middle of their fleet. After taking Havok and the Starjammers in custody, Vulcan declares that he will return the Shi'ar empire to its former glory.

=== War of Kings ===
After learning of the devastation of the Skrull fleet and the takeover of Hala by the Inhumans, Vulcan launches a surprise attack on the Kree, now ruled by Black Bolt. Vulcan intends to execute Lilandra, but is stopped by one of his admirals, stating that doing so will make Lilandra a martyr and risk him being overthrown.

Soon afterward, Lilandra is assassinated by Darkhawk in an attempt to usurp Vulcan. Immediately, a civil war ignites in the Imperium between factions loyal to Lilandra and Vulcan. Vulcan confronts Black Bolt, believing that he intends to destroy the Shi'ar empire. Vulcan and Black Bolt are seemingly killed when Black Bolt's T-Bomb explodes, creating a hole in the fabric of space and time that becomes known as the Fault. Gladiator takes Vulcan's place as Majestor of the Shi'ar.

=== Dawn of X ===
In Dawn of X, Vulcan is revealed to have survived, with no memory of his time of Shi'ar emperor, and becomes a citizen of Krakoa. He later learns that the Many-Angled Ones captured him during his time in the Fault and manipulated his mind. Vulcan kills most of the Cotati as the survivors prepare to attack Krakoa. Vulcan creates constructs of Petra and Sway, who cannot be resurrected on Krakoa as they died before Cerebro was created.

== Powers and abilities ==
Vulcan is an Omega-level mutant with the ability to psionically manipulate, control, and absorb vast amounts of energy. In addition to traditional energies of the electromagnetic spectrum, Vulcan has displayed control over exotic energies such as magical energy and Cyclops' optic blasts.

Vulcan has used his powers to produce light, heat, force, and electricity, as well as warp or disable large amounts and different types of existing energy sources, tap into and suppress mutant energies, survive in the vacuum of space, and fly. Outside a planetary atmosphere his flight speed can even reach near the speed of light. He can track energy signatures over vast interstellar distances, as demonstrated when he located a trio of starships. He is able to go without food for long periods by directly absorbing energy, and can generate protective force fields for interstellar travel. He can manipulate electricity within a person's brain and use the powers of others by manipulating their own energy sources, although he needs to be in their presence to achieve this. The exact limits of his power replication abilities are unknown, but he was capable of utilising Marvel Girl's telepathy without her consent. Vulcan also possesses the capability of solidifying energy into solid shapes, in effect simulating telekinesis.

Vulcan is able to use his psionic abilities for a variety of uses. Despite little (if any) formal training in the use of his mental powers, Vulcan has demonstrated feats such as completely resisting mental manipulation/assault by far more experienced telepathic beings, and he was also able to restore former Shi'ar emperor D'Ken from a catatonic state, something the most powerful/skilled telepaths of the entire Shi'ar empire had previously been unable to accomplish. Vulcan does not possess any innate telepathic abilities, but can manipulate the telepathic energies of others (which enables him to shield his mind from outside attacks). In the instance with D'Ken, he used his energy powers to reactivate the electrical connections in the neurons of D'Ken's brain that had been damaged by the M'Kraan Crystal.

All three Summers brothers have similar energy-manipulating powers. While Alex and Scott are known to be immune to each other's powers, they are apparently not immune to Vulcan's powers nor is Vulcan immune to Alex's.

Vulcan is capable of absorbing vast amounts of energy in any form. In an engagement, Vulcan forced Adam Warlock to flee after robbing him of most of his power within seconds. Vulcan's absorption abilities, though vast, have limits. He was unable to absorb or deflect a powerful blast from his brother Havok (although at the time Havok was powered beyond his normal levels), leaving Vulcan wounded and at the mercy of his brother. Though high-order energy projection rapidly depletes his reserves, as demonstrated in his fight against Shi'ar warships and later the Imperial Guard, Vulcan's energy manipulation abilities are not based on said energy reserves. He can continue to manipulate external sources of energy even when they are depleted, though he is noticeably weaker when this occurs. Nevertheless, he has been shown to be easily capable of defeating multiple advanced Shi'ar starships when in such a state.

After being swallowed by the soil of Krakoa, he absorbed the powers of his teammates Sway, Darwin, and Petra, giving him their powers of time manipulation, physical adaptation, and earth manipulation respectively. These powers are lost when Rachel Summers separates him from Darwin.

When not in possession of Darwin's powers, Vulcan's body is as vulnerable as any normal human as far as durability is concerned. Blows from Black Bolt were shown to be capable of drawing blood and chipping teeth. When battling the X-Men, Vulcan has been susceptible to physical blows. However, Vulcan can use his energy abilities to create force fields or to rebuild damaged/destroyed portions of his body, the total extent of which is unknown, as Vulcan still required a prosthetic eye after a strike from Gladiator.

According to his creator, Ed Brubaker, Vulcan has a "hidden potential" which allows him to fully generate and have control over seven elements (fire, earth, electricity, wind, water, darkness, and light).

== Reception ==
In 2014, Entertainment Weekly ranked Vulcan 77th in their "Let's rank every X-Man ever" list.

== Other versions ==
=== Age of X ===
In the Age of X reality, Vulcan is in an induced coma at Barton-Howell research facility.

=== What If? ===
What If? Deadly Genesis explores what would have happened if Vulcan and his team had survived their venture on Krakoa. In this reality, Vulcan and his team make their way through the island, surviving its assault. Vulcan becomes separated from the group and finds the captured X-Men. After accidentally killing them all in a panic, Vulcan escapes the temple and, with the rest of his team, the island itself. Krakoa is jettisoned into deep space, where it remains untouched for years until being discovered by the Silver Surfer. In the intervening time, Vulcan's team of X-Men had become very popular with the general population of Earth, but when the Surfer alerts the X-Men to his discovery, Sway finds a time pocket and uses her powers to replay the events of Vulcan's killings. After confronting Vulcan about the lie and disabling his powers, Professor Xavier forces him to leave Earth, although he announces that he is traveling into space to protect other worlds to protect the reputation of mutants. Vulcan is banished to Krakoa as it resumes drifting through space, and, as punishment, he is forced to replay the death of the X-Men every time he requires food. Vulcan muses that he feels less guilt each time he watches this replay, and wonders how long it will take until he feels nothing at all.

A second story, "What If? Rise and Fall of the Shi'ar Empire", examines what would have happened to the Shi'ar empire if Vulcan had absorbed the energies of the M'Kraan Crystal instead of Professor Xavier and become the Phoenix.

== Collected editions ==
Vulcan's stories have been collected into trade paperbacks:

- Deadly Genesis (200 pages, hardcover, August 2006, ISBN 0-7851-1961-2, softcover, January 2007, ISBN 0-7851-1830-6)
- Rise and Fall of the Shi'ar Empire (collects The Uncanny X-Men #475–486, 312 pages, August 2007, hardcover, ISBN 0-7851-2515-9, softcover, February 2008, ISBN 0-7851-1800-4)
- Emperor Vulcan (120 pages, May 2008, ISBN 0-7851-2551-5)
- Road to War of Kings (collects X-Men: Kingbreaker #1–4, Secret Invasion: War of Kings, and War of Kings Saga, 176 pages, June 2009, ISBN 0-7851-3967-2)

== In other media ==
Vulcan makes a non-speaking cameo appearance in the X-Men '97 episode "Lifedeath - Part 2".
