= Brood (comics) =

Fictional extraterrestrial species in Marvel Comics

- Cover art for Ms. Marvel vol. 2 #2; Art by Frank Cho

Publication information
- Publisher: Marvel Comics
- First appearance: Uncanny X-Men #155 (March 1982) (March 1982)
- Created by: Chris Claremont (writer); Dave Cockrum (artist)

Characteristics
- Place of origin: Sleazeworld
- Inherent abilities: The Brood possess wings, fanged teeth and a stinging tail. They have a hive mentality and mindlessly follow a queen. To reproduce, they must infect other races with their eggs.

The Brood are a fictional race of insectoid, parasitic, extraterrestrial beings appearing in American comic books published by Marvel Comics, especially Uncanny X-Men. Created by writer Chris Claremont and artist Dave Cockrum, they first appeared in The Uncanny X-Men #155 (March 1982).

== Concept and creation ==
According to Dave Cockrum, the Brood were originally conceived to serve as generic subordinates for the main villain of The Uncanny X-Men #155: "We had Deathbird in this particular story and Chris [Claremont] had written into the plot 'miscellaneous alien henchmen.' So I had drawn Deathbird standing in this building under construction and I just drew the most horrible looking thing I could think of next to her."

== Biology ==
=== Physical characteristics ===
The Brood are insect-like aliens. Despite their resemblance to insects, the Brood have endoskeletons as well as exoskeletons. Also unlike insects, they have fanged jaws instead of mandibles. Their skulls are triangular and flat, with a birthmark between their eyes. Their two front legs are tentacles they can use to manipulate objects.

Due to their natural body armor and fangs, the Brood are very dangerous in combat. In addition, they have stingers that can deliver either paralyzing or killing venom.

=== Reproduction ===
The Brood reproduce asexually and have no clear gender. They reproduce by forcibly implanting their eggs into other sentient organism. Each host can only support one egg. Upon hatching, the host dies as the Brood egg releases mutagenic enzymes into the bloodstream. At the same time, the Broodling mentally attacks and assimilates its host, usually destroying their mind. If the host possesses any powers, the resultant Brood will inherit them.

=== Civilization ===
- The Empress is the ruler of the Brood and contains the species' hive mind. Only one Empress can exist at a time. Brood Empresses are larger than normal Brood and have telepathic abilities that give them a link with the entire Brood hive. The Brood Empress is served by the Firstborn, guards who help her kill renegade Brood.
- The Firstborn are the children and servants of the Empress. The Firstborn are larger than common Brood Warriors-Prime and have spiked armor plating and the ability to teleport short distances. However, they lack the wings and tentacles of the Broodlings.
- The Brood Queens fulfill the mental command of the Empress and can communicate with their spawn via telepathy. The Queen's tail functions as a venom-filled stinger rather than an ovipositor. There are two specific biological variations of Brood Queens: the small Dwarf Brood Queen, are Queens that due to their size and strength are raised among the bottom level of the Brood, and the standard slightly larger Brood Queens. The Queens lead individual colonies, which usually encompass entire planets.
- The Broodlings are Brood workers and warriors. Elite Broodlings are known as Warriors-Prime. The Warrior-Prime retains the genetic memory of its host, enabling it to access the host's abilities and assume their appearance.
- The Brood King is a mutant Brood created by infecting a host with a King Brood egg. Unlike those infected with Queen's or Drone's eggs, the Brood King cannot infect others and maintains much of its original personality.

== Fictional species biography ==
Cover to Uncanny X-Men #166 (February 1983). Art by Paul Smith. Featured are the X-Men (Kitty Pryde, Lilandra, Colossus, Cyclops, Wolverine, and Nightcrawler) fighting the Brood

The Brood originate from a dark galaxy prior to the emergence of Galactus from his incubator. Their planet of origin is unknown, but it is rumored that the Brood originated from another dimension.

Deathbird allies with the Brood to gain their help deposing her sister Lilandra Neramani as ruler of the Shi'ar. As a reward for their help, Deathbird gives the Brood Lilandra, the X-Men, and Carol Danvers, along with Fang of the Imperial Guard, to use as hosts. The Brood infect the entire party except for Danvers, who is subjected to experiments due to her status as a human-Kree hybrid. Wolverine's healing factor purges him of the Brood embryo, and he helps the others escape. He is unable to save Fang, who becomes a Brood warrior before they leave.

After returning to Earth with the Starjammers, the X-Men defeat and detain the Brood Queen infecting Charles Xavier. The Starjammers transfer the consciousness of Xavier from the Brood Queen's body to a new cloned body, enabling Xavier to walk again.

During the invasion of Annihilus and his Annihilation Wave, the Brood were decimated, and the species is now on the brink of extinction. Several of the Brood appear in the Planet Hulk storyline. A Brood Queen referred to as "No-Name", introduced in Planet Hulk, became a member of the Warbound.

According to Bishop, there would be a race of benevolent Brood in the future, prompting the X-Men to willingly serve as Brood hosts, so that they could instill them with the same compassion felt by No-Name. After being connected with the hive-mind, the X-Men learned of a nearby Brood who was born with the ability to feel compassion, making him the Brood equivalent of a mutant. While such Brood are typically destroyed upon hatching by their kind, this one is permitted to live due to the Brood's dwindling numbers. After rescuing the Brood mutant, the X-Men have their Brood embryos removed to be raised aboard the Peak, with the Brood mutant acting as their mentor. The 2012 series Wolverine and the X-Men features the mutant Broodling, nicknamed Broo, as a student at Wolverine's Jean Grey School for Higher Learning.

== In other media ==
=== Television ===
- The Brood make a cameo appearance in the X-Men: The Animated Series episode "Mojovision".
  - The Brood appear in the X-Men '97 episode "Weapon X, Lies, and DVDs".
- The Brood make a cameo appearance in the Avengers Assemble episode "Mojoworld".
- A Brood makes a cameo appearance in the M.O.D.O.K. episode "Beware What from Portal Comes!".

=== Video games ===
- A Brood Queen appears as a boss in X-Men (1994).
- The Brood appear in X-Men: Mutant Apocalypse.
- The Brood appear in Marvel Heroes.
- The Brood appear as a card in Marvel Snap.
- The Brood appear in Marvel's Deadpool VR.

=== Collectibles ===
- One of the Marvel Milestone statues features Marc Silvestri's Brood-infected Wolverine cover for Uncanny X-Men #234.
- Brood Queen is one of the "build a figure" toys in the Marvel Legends series.
- Broodling toys have been produced by Toy Biz (winged, for their X-Men line) and Marvel Select Toys (unwinged and based on Fang's transformation, in a two pack with a Skrull warrior).
