= Corsair (character) =

Fictional superhero character in the Marvel universe

- Corsair, as he appeared on the cover of X-Men: Spotlight on Starjammers #1 (May 1990); Art by Dave Cockrum

Publication information
- Publisher: Marvel Comics
- First appearance: The Uncanny X-Men #104 (Apr. 1977)
- Created by: Dave Cockrum

In-story information
- Full name: Christopher Summers
- Species: Human
- Team affiliations: Starjammers; Shi'ar empire; United States Air Force
- Partnerships: Cyclops (son); Havok (son); Vulcan (son); Cable (grandson); Gwen Warren (genetic granddaughter); Rachel Summers (granddaughter)
- Abilities: Highly skilled pilot, swordsman, and marksman

Corsair (Major Christopher Summers, USAF) is a fictional character appearing in American comic books published by Marvel Comics. The character is depicted as a star-faring outlaw who leads the Starjammers, the father of X-Men members Cyclops and Havok, and the supervillain Vulcan, and the grandfather of Cable, Spider-Girl, and Rachel Summers. He first appeared in The Uncanny X-Men #104, and was created by Dave Cockrum.

== Concept and creation ==
Dave Cockrum created the Starjammers with the intent of having them star in their own series. When Cockrum submitted the concept for Marvel's two try-out series, Marvel Spotlight and Marvel Premiere, he was repeatedly informed that both series were booked for two years. Running out of patience, Cockrum showed the Starjammers, including Corsair, to X-Men writer Chris Claremont, and convinced him to use the characters for this series. Corsair was made the father of Cyclops, leader of the X-Men, which gave the Starjammers a connection to the X-Men and allowed them to make recurring appearances in the X-Men series.

== Fictional character biography ==
=== Origins ===
Many years ago, a test pilot for NASA, United States Air Force Major Christopher Summers, was flying himself, his wife Katherine, and their two young sons Scott and Alex in their private airplane, a rebuilt de Havilland Mosquito, down the Western American coast from Alaska when their plane was attacked by a starship from the alien Shi'ar empire on an exploratory mission to Earth. The Shi'ar pursued Summers' craft to prevent Summers from making their presence on Earth known to the general public. The Shi'ar craft fired on Summers' plane, causing it to burst into flame. Unable to find more than one usable parachute in time, Katherine put it on her eldest son Scott, told him to hold onto Alex, and pushed them both out the plane door, hoping to save them both. Scott and Alex thus escaped the Shi'ar.

Summers and his wife were teleported aboard the Shi'ar starship and taken to the Shi'ar Imperial Throneworld of Chandilar. There, Christopher was separated from his wife and imprisoned. He soon broke free and discovered the mad Shi'ar emperor D'Ken attempting to rape Katherine. D'Ken responded to the interruption by murdering Katherine, then ordered Summers to be imprisoned in the Slave Pits of Alsibar.

=== Formation of the Starjammers ===
In the Pits, Summers met four aliens who had been imprisoned for various crimes against the Shi'ar empire – Ch'od, Cr'reee, Hepzibah, and Raza Longknife. Together, they escaped and stole a starship. Naming their vessel the Starjammer, and themselves the Starjammers, the group functioned as space pirates targeting Shi'ar vessels, thus taking vengeance on the Shi'ar but taking care not to harm innocent passengers in the process. The Starjammers quickly came to be regarded as outlaws by the Shi'ar. In addition, Summers and Hepzibah became lovers.

=== X-Men ===
The Starjammers first encounter the X-Men when they join forces to battle the Imperial Guard, enforcers of the Shi'ar. The Phoenix Force, then posing as Jean Grey, uses its telepathy on Corsair and learns that he is Scott Summers' father, but keeps this information secret at his request.

The Starjammers aid Shi'ar princess Lilandra Neramani against her brother D'Ken. After becoming empress of the Shi'ar in D'Ken's stead, Lilandra puts an unofficial end to the Shi'ar's opposition to the Starjammers. Corsair aids the X-Men against the Sidri, during which Cyclops learns that Corsair is his father.

Deathbird, Lilandra's sister, orchestrates a coup d'état and seizes the throne. Herself branded a rebel, Lilandra joins the Starjammers in their fight against Deathbird's tyrannical reign. Eventually, Lilandra and the Starjammers' opposition to Deathbird's rule inspires rebellions across the Shi'ar empire. Following an attempted takeover of the Shi'ar empire by Skrull forces, Lilandra settles matters with Deathbird, discovering her sister no longer wanted the throne. Corsair and the Starjammers go on to aid the Shi'ar in fending off attacks from the Uncreated and Galactus.

=== Death ===
Corsair has been reunited with Havok, his son, who brought him news about Vulcan. Corsair decided to support the X-Men and Lilandra in preventing D'Ken from becoming emperor once more. In the midst of a battle between the Shi'ar troops loyal to Lilandra and troops loyal to D'Ken, Vulcan kills D'Ken and proclaims himself emperor. Corsair commands Vulcan to stop, but Vulcan kills Corsair.

=== Return ===
When a time-displaced teenage Jean Grey is kidnapped by the Shi'ar to be placed on trial for her actions as Phoenix, the All-New X-Men and the Guardians of the Galaxy travel through space to save her. It was then that they encountered Corsair, who was alive and well and back in charge of the Starjammers.

== Powers and abilities ==
Corsair has no superhuman powers, though he is athletic for a man of his age. He is trained in basic hand-to-hand combat, as well as fencing skills and Shi'ar fighting techniques. He also has extensive knowledge of both terrestrial and Shi'ar weapons and exceptional piloting skills in both terrestrial and Shi'ar aircraft and spacecraft. He is usually armed with a saber-like Shi'ar blade and utilizes various Shi'ar weapons as needed which he carries in an extra-dimensional pocket, notable among which are twin energy blasters accessible by pressing the "jewels" on his gauntlets.

== Other versions ==
=== Age of Apocalypse ===
The Age of Apocalypse incarnation of Corsair as depicted in Tales from the Age of Apocalypse: Sinister Bloodlines (December 1997). Art by Steve Epting and Nick Napolitano.

An alternate universe version of Christopher Summers appears in "Age of Apocalypse". This version was abducted by the Shi'ar alongside his wife Katherine, who was killed after undergoing intense experimentation. Summers' sons, Alex and Scott, were found and raised by Mister Sinister, becoming high-ranking members of Apocalypse's Elite Mutant Force.

After landing on Earth, Summers attacks his children and Sinister before regaining enough control of his body to allow Scott to kill him.

=== X-Men Forever ===
In the X-Men Forever alternate reality, Corsair and the Starjammers settle down to work as security for Nathan Summers, his grandson, who is living with Corsair's parents in Alaska.

== In other media ==
=== Television ===
- Corsair appears in X-Men: The Animated Series, voiced by Brian Taylor.
- Corsair makes a non-speaking cameo appearance in a flashback in the X-Men: Evolution episode "The Cauldron".

=== Video games ===
Corsair appears in Marvel: Ultimate Alliance, voiced by Scott MacDonald.

== See also ==
- Third Summers brother
