= Korvus =

Publication information
- Publisher: Marvel Comics
- First appearance: The Uncanny X-Men #478 (November 2006)
- Created by: Ed Brubaker; Billy Tan

In-story information
- Alter ego: Korvus Rook'Shir
- Species: Shi'ar
- Team affiliations: Starjammers
- Abilities: Shi'ar superhuman attributes. As Wielder of the Phoenix blade: Flight; Energy blasts

Korvus is a fictional character appearing in American comic books published by Marvel Comics. Korvus uses a weapon known as the Blade of the Phoenix. He made his first appearance in The Uncanny X-Men #478 (November 2006).

== Fictional character biography ==
Centuries prior, the Shi'ar Rook'shir channeled the power of the Phoenix Force through his sword, called the Blade of the Phoenix. He devastated much of the Shi'ar empire until the Imperial Guard was formed to defeat him. However, a fraction of Rook'shir's power remained in the blade, which could only be lifted by his direct descendants. The Shi'ar began killing Rook'shir's descendants to prevent the sword from being used again.

Rook'shir's descendants are killed by Vice-Chancellor K'tor, a loyalist of D'Ken. He keeps Korvus, the sole survivor, as a slave. Korvus is later taken to a high-security prison on the moon Pygim.

K'tor approaches Korvus in prison and offers to commute his sentence if he acts against Rachel Summers, who is attempting to stop Vulcan's quest for vengeance against the Shi'ar. Korvus is given the Blade of the Phoenix to assist him in his goal. When Korvus attempts to kill Rachel, she touches the Blade, forging a mental link with Vulcan that allows them to see each other's past. Korvus forms a close bond with Rachel and chooses to help the X-Men. Korvus and Rachel briefly enter a relationship, but she chooses to separate from him, believing that their connection is not genuine. Korvus is saddened, having genuinely fallen in love with Rachel.

After the death of Corsair at the hands of Vulcan, Korvus joins the Starjammers, electing to remain in Shi'ar space and restore Lilandra Neramani to the throne. As part of the Starjammers, Korvus appears prominently in the War of Kings storyline, which also features Vulcan, the Inhumans, Nova, and the Guardians of the Galaxy.

While on a Shi'ar space station, Korvus and seven others are attacked by Friendless, a telepathic alien who triggered a fight between those on the station. Friendless is eventually beaten and the space station is teleported into Earth's orbit. Korvus is dismayed at being transported far from home.

Korvus eventually leaves Earth with a Shi'ar salvage crew who were on the space station and were searching for a captain. Korvus eventually leaves the Shi'ar crew to rejoin the Starjammers alongside Corsair, who has been resurrected. He serves as the group's resident mechanic and is placed in charge while Corsair is away.

== Powers and abilities ==
Korvus possesses all the typical attributes associated with the avian Shi'ar race: superhuman strength, enhanced speed, reflexes, agility, flexibility, coordination, balance, and endurance.

As wielder of the Phoenix Blade, Korvus is able to fly and fire energy blasts through the sword.
