= Starjammers =

Comic book team of space pirates

- The new Starjammers. Art by Billy Tan.

Group publication information
- Publisher: Marvel Comics
- First appearance: X-Men #107 (October 1977)
- Created by: Dave Cockrum (writer-artist); Chris Claremont (writer)

In-story information
- Type of organization: Team
- Agent(s): Ch'od; Cr'reee; Corsair; Korvus; Raza Longknife; Cyclops; Hepzibah; Sikorsky; Waldo

Starjammers

Series publication information
- Schedule: Monthly
- Format: Limited series
- Genre: Science fiction, superhero
- Publication date: (X-Men Spotlight On...Starjammers); May – June 1990 (vol. 1); October 1995 – January 1996 (vol. 2); September 2004 – February 2005
- Number of issues: X-Men Spotlight On...Starjammers; 2 (vol. 1); 4 (vol. 2); 6
- Creator(s): Dave Cockrum (writer-artist); Chris Claremont (writer)

The Starjammers are a fictional team of space pirates appearing in American comic books published by Marvel Comics. The Starjammers have often appeared in pages of the X-Men comic books. The Starjammers first appeared in X-Men #107 (October 1977) and were created by Dave Cockrum. The name "Starjammers" was created on the basis of the type of sailing ship known as "Windjammer".

== Concept and creation ==
Dave Cockrum created the Starjammers with the intent of having them star in their own series. However, when he submitted the concept for Marvel's two try-out series, Marvel Spotlight and Marvel Premiere, he was repeatedly informed that these series were booked for two years solid. Cockrum showed the Starjammers to X-Men writer Chris Claremont and convinced him to use the characters for this series. In order to provide a plausible excuse for the Starjammers to make repeat appearances in X-Men, they decided to make Corsair, the leader of the Starjammers, be the father of Cyclops, the leader of the X-Men.

== History ==
=== Origin ===
The story of the Starjammers began with Christopher Summers, a military pilot returning with his family from a trip to Alaska. Without warning their plane was attacked. Chris's wife, Katherine, strapped their two sons (Scott Summers and Alexander Summers, who later became the X-Men Cyclops and Havok) to their only parachute and pushed them out of the plane, saving their lives. The husband and wife were then teleported from their plane to the ship of an advanced alien race called the Shi'ar. This had been a zoological scouting mission to bring in a human specimen. They were brought before D'Ken, the ruler of the Shi'ar, who was immediately smitten with Katherine, making her his concubine and sending her husband to the slave pits. Eventually, Christopher escaped and reached D'Ken's private quarters to try to assassinate him. However, he was caught and punished by having his wife murdered before his eyes, and his unborn son Gabriel cut out of her womb. His spirit broken, he was sent to a mining camp on another planet.

=== Formation of the team ===
While working in the mining camp, Christopher witnessed the guards mercilessly beating a feline-like female. He stepped in, trying to get them to stop, but was then beaten himself. The woman was taken to the holding cells and Christopher huddled up in a corner, ashamed of himself. A little while later, Raza and Ch'od passed by and asked Christopher for the whereabouts of their comrade Hepzibah. Christopher was too afraid to answer. After they had left, he felt guilty and went to the guards' quarters, starting a fight after killing one of them. Raza and Ch'od jumped in, and together they got past the guards, freed the cat-woman, and sneaked on board a Shi'ar starship. Christopher used his pilot call-sign, Corsair. Naming Christopher their captain, they became the Starjammers, a group of space pirates rebelling against D'Ken's tyranny.

=== Further adventures ===
The Starjammers have had many adventures across the universe, many of them on Earth with the X-Men, during which Christopher Summers finally met his long lost sons, now X-Men. At times, the group ran with Professor X and even his consort, the Shi'ar ruler, Lilandra Neramani. The group participated in the defeat of the cosmic threat Magus, assisted by Professor X and the New Mutants. When the Skrulls made an incursion into Shi'ar territory, the Starjammers were overwhelmed, kidnapped and duplicated. They were later rescued from their imprisonment by the X-Men.

The Hulk and Silver Surfer recruited the Starjammers to assist in a raid on Troyjan held space, to rescue several friends of the Hulk. A violent fight broke out, with the Starjammers killing several enemies. It was ended with an alien bureaucrat offered the option of the Starjammers and allies simply asking to see the person they wished to confront. The group was also temporary allies of the Avengers. For some time, they were prisoners of the Collector, a cosmic being interested in preserving unique specimens of life. They became trapped in a conflict between the Collector, Galactus and the well-meaning but dangerous efforts of Wolverine of the X-Men.

A later Starjammers series introduced a new member of the Starjammers. Although some readers believed it was out of Marvel Universe continuity, the events of the series were referenced in Official Handbook of the Marvel Universe, confirming its canonical status.

=== The Rise and Fall of the Shi'ar Empire ===
The Starjammers figured significantly in the Uncanny X-Men story arc "The Rise and Fall of the Shi'ar Empire", a 12-issue story arc following on the events of X-Men: Deadly Genesis.

Within this story arc, the long-lost third son of Corsair, Gabriel Summers, now the powerful mutant known as Vulcan, travels from Earth to Shi'ar space seeking revenge against D'Ken and the Shi'ar empire for the death of his mother and his own mistreatment by the Shi'ar. Through the course of the story, Vulcan allies with Deathbird to depose her brother the emperor, but later seems to side himself with D'Ken against the X-Men and the Starjammers, who seek to stop his plans for revenge. Vulcan soon turns on and kills D'Ken, and by marrying his ally (and sister of D'Ken) Deathbird, assumes the throne of the Shi'ar empire himself. In the course of the finale, Corsair, Vulcan's father, is seemingly killed. Hepzibah is returned to Earth with the X-Men, while Havok, Polaris and Marvel Girl remain behind. Havok decides to assume his father's position as leader of the Starjammers. Polaris opts to stay with him. Marvel Girl remains behind as well, having developed an intimate relationship with Korvus, a Shi'ar warrior whose ancestor was once a host of the Phoenix Force (like Marvel Girl); his sword allows him to access the force to a degree as well. The Starjammers' new mission is to defeat Havok's brother and return Lilandra to the throne of the Sh'iar empire.

Hepzibah expresses no wish to return to the Starjammers following Corsair's death, and has decided to stay on Earth and become an X-Man. The Starjammers are now: Havok, Polaris, Ch'od, Marvel Girl, Raza, Korvus, Sikorsky, and Cr'reee.

=== X-Men: Emperor Vulcan ===
The further adventures of the Starjammers are continued in the series: X-Men: Emperor Vulcan, this miniseries (5 issues) is written by Chris Yost and pencilled by Paco Diaz. Havok and the Starjammers attack Shi'ar space. Vulcan appears with an armada to kill them, and a new alien race gets involved. The new race's name translates to "Death to the Shi'ar", and they destroy the Shi'ar flagship. In the aftermath of the miniseries, most of the Starjammers are captured and subsequently imprisoned by Vulcan. Lilandra, Korvus, and Rachel Summers escape.

=== X-Men: Kingbreaker and War of Kings ===
The Starjammers play a large role in X-Men: Kingbreaker, a follow-up to the Emperor Vulcan storyline. They are seen prominently in the War of Kings storyline, which also features Vulcan, the Inhumans, Nova, and the Guardians of the Galaxy.

=== Poison X ===
When Chris was talking to Cyclops from the past, the Starjammers are attacked by mercenaries with symbiotes. The mercenaries wanted them so they could go to steal with the help of their navigator. The X-Men Blue team, with the help of a reluctant Venom, went to space so they could save the Starjammers. When the symbiotes bonded with the Starjammers, the X-Men went to the mercenaries' ship and Cyclops freed the team. While the symbiotes were battling amongst themselves, the Poisons arrived, consumed the mercenaries, and began attacking the X-Men since they themselves were now bonded to symbiotes. They survived and after escaping the Poisons and the X-Men gave their symbiotes to the Starjammers to return them to Klyntar.

=== Death of Thanos ===
In the aftermath of the "Infinity Wars" storyline, the Starjammers were present at Thanos' funeral. Starfox shows all the guests a recording of Thanos stating that he uploaded his consciousness in a new body before his death. The funeral is attacked by the Black Order, who steals Thanos's body and rip open a black hole in space, sending everyone into the rip. Though Silver Surfer was able to rescue the Starjammers with the cost of his own wellbeing, everyone else were still trapped. Everyone is saved by the arrival of Gladiator and the Shi'ar Empire.

== Membership ==
Characters marked in bold lettering are current members of the Starjammers.

- Binary: Carol Danvers. A human/Kree hybrid who controls vast amounts of cosmic energy, has super strength, flight, and the ability to survive unaided in space. Now Captain Marvel, she is currently a member of the Avengers.
- Corsair: Leader, father of the X-Men Cyclops and Havok, as well as the villain Vulcan. He was the lover of fellow Starjammer Hepzibah until his death, but since his return has rekindled his romance with her.
- Ch'od: Large reptilian creature, a member of the Saurid race.
- Cr'reee: A white, furry companion for Ch'od which only he can understand.
- Cyclops: Scott Summers, a member of time-displaced original X-Men, joined the Starjammers to bond with his father.
- Havok: Alex Summers is a member of the X-Men and a former interim leader/captain in the Starjammers.
- Hepzibah: Corsair's lover until his death. A member of the Mephitisoid race; her true name is nearly unpronounceable to humans. She left the Starjammers after Corsair's death, joining the X-Men and later X-Force. She had Corsair resurrected by The Shrouded and rejoined the Starjammers to be with him.
- Keeyah: A Kree who formerly acted as pilot.
- Korvus: Descendant of a Shi'ar host for the Phoenix Force.
- Raza Longknife: The last surviving member of an unknown race exterminated by the Shi'ar emperor D'Ken.
- Marvel Girl: Rachel Summers, former member of the X-Men and Excalibur; telepath/telekinetic, has been a host for the Phoenix Force.
- Lilandra Neramani: Former Empress of the Shi'ar Empire. Killed by Darkhawk (who was controlled by Razor) in War of Kings.
- Polaris: Lorna Dane, the lime-haired former X-Men member with the mutant power of magnetism.
- Professor X: Founder of the X-Men; telepath. Briefly a member after the events of Uncanny X-Men #200.
- Sikorsky: An insect-like alien and expert physician.
- Tolo Hawk: Former cadet in the Union Defense Corps.
- Waldo: The artificial intelligence of the Starjammers' ship, destroyed beyond repair.

== Other versions ==
=== Age of Apocalypse ===
An alternate universe iteration of the Starjammers appears in Age of Apocalypse, consisting of Corsair, Ch'od, Hepzibah, and Raza Longknife. The group is initially led by Corsair before he is infected with a Brood embryo and forced to return to Earth. Following Corsair's departure, Deathbird becomes the leader of the Starjammers.

=== Mutant X ===
In this reality, the Starjammers consist of Cyclops, Binary, Lockheed, Nova, and Silver Surfer.

=== Others ===
- Heroes Reborn: The group consist of Corsair, Hepzibah, Havok, Cyclops, Groot, Rocket Raccoon, and Johnny Storm.
- Dead X-Men: In a reality created by the Moira Engine, the Starjammers are led by Lockheed and consists of Sunspot, Warbird, Smasher (Josiah Guthrie), Mercury, Juggernaut, and Hepzibah.
- The Muppets Take the Marvel Universe: The Starhammers consist of Cosair (Link Hogthrob), Hepzibah (Miss Piggy), and Ch'od (Sweetums).

== In other media ==
- The Starjammers appear in X-Men: The Animated Series, consisting of Corsair, Hepzibah, Ch'od, Raza, and Cr'reee.
- The Starjammers are a team in Marvel Strike Force, consisting of Havok, Lilandra, and Howard the Duck.

== Collected editions ==
Title	Material collected	Published date	ISBN
X-Men: Starjammers by Dave Cockrum	X-Men (vol. 1) #107-108, Uncanny X-Men (vol. 1) #154-158, 161–167, X-Men: Spotlight On Starjammers #1-2	October 2019	978-1302920463
Starjammers	Starjammers (vol. 1) #1-4, Starjammers (vol.2) #1-6, material from X-Men Unlimited #32	June 2019	978-1302918699
X-Men: Emperor Vulcan	X-Men: Emperor Vulcan #1-5	May 2008	978-0785125518
War Of Kings: Road To War Of Kings	X-Men: Kingbreaker #1-4 and Secret Invasion: War of Kings, War of Kings Saga	June 2009	978-0785139676
War of Kings Omnibus	X-Men: Emperor Vulcan #1-5, X-Men: Kingbreaker #1-4 and Uncanny X-Men #475-486, Secret Invasion: War of Kings #1, War of Kings: Darkhawk #1-2, War of Kings: Warriors #1-2, War of Kings #1-6, War of Kings: Ascension #1-4, War of Kings: Savage World of Sakaar #1, Nova #23-28, Guardians of the Galaxy #13-19, War of Kings: Who Will Rule? #1, Marvel Spotlilght: War of Kings and material from X-Men: Divided We Stand #2	November 2016	978-1302902254
