= Ch'od =

Marvel comics character

- Ch'od. Art by Billy Tan.

Publication information
- Publisher: Marvel Comics
- First appearance: X-Men #104 (Apr. 1977)
- Created by: Dave Cockrum

In-story information
- Alter ego: Ch'od
- Species: Saurid
- Team affiliations: Starjammers
- Abilities: Superhuman physical abilities; Expert marksman, swordsman, and hand-to-hand combatant

Ch'od is a fictional character appearing in American comic books published by Marvel Comics. The character is usually seen in the X-Men series and various spin-offs.

== Publication history ==
Dave Cockrum created the Starjammers with the intent of having them star in their own series. However, when he submitted the concept for Marvel's two try-out series, Marvel Spotlight and Marvel Premiere, he was repeatedly informed that these series were booked for two years solid. Cockrum showed the Starjammers to X-Men writer Chris Claremont and convinced him to use the characters for this series. He first appeared in X-Men #104 (April 1977).

== Fictional character biography ==
Ch'od is a Saurid, a lizard-like alien from the planet Timor (Varanus IV) in the Shi'ar Empire and a founding member of the Starjammers. He is often accompanied by Cr'reee, a small furry alien from the planet Lupus.

Ch'od first met the X-Men when the Starjammers came to aid them against D'Ken's Imperial Guard. He helped save Colossus's life in outer space, and engaged in mock combat with Carol Danvers. With the Starjammers, he aided the New Mutants against the Magus.

Ch'od and Hepzibah sought the "map-rod" holding information on the location of the "Phalkon" power source, which was actually the Phoenix. Deathbird's Shi'ar starships attacked the Starhammers. The Starjammers went to Earth and met Excalibur, and aided a rebellion against Deathbird on a Shi'ar border world.

For a time he and his fellow Starjammers were imprisoned and replaced by the Warskrulls, who were attempting to conquer the Shi'ar Empire. The Warskrulls impersonated the Starjammers and key members of the Imperial Guard, until the X-Men helped rescue them.

Ch'od battled Wonder Man and the Vision while escorting the Shi'ar nega-bomb.

Ch'od has suffered the death of his loyal friend Corsair. He also endured Hepzibah's stranding on Earth, although several X-Men have remained with the Starjammers.

While trying to rescue Lilandra Neramani from the Imperial Guard, Ch'od loses his right hand and blames himself for failing to save her. During the mission to rescue their empress, Ch'od and the Starjammers end up rescuing a team from the Guardians of the Galaxy led by Rocket Raccoon, who is an old friend of Ch'od and Corsair. This act however leads to their cover being blown forcing the Starjammers to flee.

== Powers and abilities ==
As a member of the Saurid race, Ch'od possesses superhuman strength, durability, and endurance, and is amphibious.

He is also an expert marksman (with various forms of Shi'ar weaponry), swordsman, and hand-to-hand combatant, having been trained in various forms of combat known in the Shi'ar Galaxy. He is a highly skilled starship pilot. He has carried Shi'ar-manufactured swords, battleaxes, and energy guns as weapons.

== Reception ==
In 2018, Comic Book Resources (CBR) ranked Ch'od 15th in their "Age Of Apocalypse: The 30 Strongest Characters In Marvel's Coolest Alternate World" list.

== In other media ==
Ch'od appears in X-Men: The Animated Series as a member of the Starjammers.
