= Rachel Summers =

Marvel Comics fictional character

- Rachel Grey as Askani on textless variant cover of X-Factor #2 (August 28, 2024). Art by Clayton Crain.

Publication information
- Publisher: Marvel Comics
- First appearance: The Uncanny X-Men #141 (Jan. 1981)
- Created by: Chris Claremont (writer); John Byrne (artist); John Romita Jr. (artist)

In-story information
- Full name: Rachel Anne Summers
- Species: Human mutant
- Team affiliations: X-Men; X-Factor (Dawn of X); Hounds; New Mutants (Earth-811); Excalibur; Clan Askani; X-Treme Sanctions Executive; Starjammers; Knights of X
- Partnerships: Betsy Braddock (girlfriend); Jean Grey (mother); Scott Summers (father); Cable (brother); Gwen Warren (sister); Corsair (grandfather); Havok (uncle); Vulcan (uncle)
- Notable aliases: Phoenix; Mother Askani; Bright Lady; Alyzr'n Summerset; The Celestial Avatar; The Cosmic Avatar; R'Chell; Revenant; Marvel Girl; Prestige; Starchilde; Askani
- Abilities: Time manipulation; Empathy; Telepathy; Telekinesis; Abilities as the Phoenix Force's avatar

Rachel Anne Summers or Rachel Grey is a fictional character appearing in American comic books published by Marvel Comics. She was created by writer Chris Claremont and artist/co-plotter John Byrne.

In her first appearance, Rachel's surname was not revealed, but in later appearances, she was established as the daughter of the alternate future counterparts to Cyclops and Jean Grey-Summers from the dystopian Days of Future Past timeline. Although there are other characters bearing her name throughout the multiverse, Rachel is considered a multiversal anomaly with no true alternate-universe counterparts.

Rachel is a mutant with similar abilities to her mother, including telepathy, telekinesis, and a connection to the Phoenix Force. Throughout her publication history, she has also been referred to by the monikers Marvel Girl, Phoenix, Prestige, and Mother Askani (later simply Askani).

== Publication history ==
Rachel first appeared in The Uncanny X-Men #141 (Jan. 1981) and has since been affiliated with several comic book superhero teams including the X-Men and Excalibur.

In 2022, she joined the Knights of X team as part of the Destiny of X era under the leadership of Captain Britain, who takes a group of mutants under her wing leading them into the Otherworld. The title was the follow-up to the 2019's Excalibur relaunch and was written by Tini Howard. In its fourth issue, Rachel Summers and her long-time friend Betsy Braddock confessed their romantic feelings for each other and their kiss was shown in a splash page.

== Fictional character biography ==
=== Future adolescence ===
Rachel Anne Summers is the daughter of X-Men members Jean Grey and Cyclops and originates from an alternate future known as Earth-811, introduced in the "Days of Future Past" storyline. In this reality, Jean Grey did not sacrifice herself in the Dark Phoenix Saga but instead married Cyclops, and their daughter, Rachel, inherited Jean's immense psychic powers. Years later, the assassination of Senator Robert Kelly provoked the ratification of the Mutant Registration Act, leading to a dystopian future where North America is overtaken by Sentinels. Rachel is abducted by operatives working for Ahab, who use drugs and hypnotherapy to turn Rachel into the mutant-hunting "Hound". Rachel's psychic powers link her to her victims, fueling her grief and despair until she attacks and scars Ahab. In return, Rachel is sent to mutant concentration camps. There, she befriends the surviving mutant rebels, including Wolverine, Magneto, Colossus, Storm, Kate Pryde, and Franklin Richards.

Rachel manages to send Kate's consciousness into the past to her younger self to prevent the assassination, but it does not change the future. Rachel sends her astral form into the past to find out why and discovers that she had sent Kate into an alternate past. On the way back, she encounters the disembodied Phoenix Force, which had previously possessed Jean Grey but is now untethered from her since she sacrificed herself in the prime universe.

Rachel and Kate are trapped while intending to destroy a new model of Sentinel. The Phoenix Force rips Rachel from her timeline and sends her body back to the alternate past to which she had sent Kate's consciousness. In this timeline, Jean Grey was killed and Cyclops married Madelyne Pryor.

Rachel Summers in her standard 1990s red street clothing from Excalibur #44 (November 1991). Art by Alan Davis.

=== X-Men ===
Rachel briefly joins the X-Men before fully bonding with the Phoenix Force. She, Shadowcat, Nightcrawler, Captain Britain, and Meggan go on to found the team Excalibur. While part of the team, she discovers that this universe's version of her mother, Jean Grey, was alive. She attempts to bond with Jean, but Jean initially rejects any contact with her. Jean still resents the Phoenix Force for stealing a portion of her life. She also rejects Rachel because she felt that Rachel's existence is a constant reminder of the dystopian future she feared could still come to pass.

=== Askani ===
Rachel remains with Excalibur until an incident causes Captain Britain to be lost in the timestream. She exchanges places with the time-lost Captain Britain and emerges two thousand years in the future, in a world conquered by Apocalypse. She gathers together a group of rebels and founded the Askani. She trains one of her followers to travel back in time and bring her "brother" Nathan forward in time when he was infected with a techno-organic virus. The Askani clone Nathan in case he did not survive the virus. Apocalypse's followers attacks the Askani and take the clone (who would later become Stryfe), leaving Rachel critically injured. Hooked up to life support, she draws the minds of Scott and Jean into the future to raise Nathan and tutor him in the use of his powers. Rachel finally dies ten years later and sends Scott and Jean back to their original bodies seconds after they had left. After Nathan defeats Apocalypse, he retrieves Rachel, who had survived and been flung even farther into the future.

=== Rachel Grey ===
Rachel rejoins the X-Men, taking the name "Marvel Girl" to honor her mother (who had recently died yet again) and wearing a costume her mother had designed but never worn: a variation on Jean's first green costume. She also changed her last name to "Grey", possibly to express disapproval at her father's betrayal of Jean, as well as his continuing relationship with Emma Frost.

=== End of Greys ===
Rachel spends some time with her grandparents, bonding with her grandfather Corsair. At a family reunion with all her relatives, a commando unit under the order of the Shi'ar attacks the party, killing everyone in an effort to wipe out the Grey genome. The commando unit is unable to kill Rachel, who is instead given a "deathmark" on her back that allows the Shi'ar to track her.

=== Rise and Fall of the Shi'ar Empire ===
After Rachel is kidnapped, along with Cyclops, by her paternal uncle Vulcan, he frees Darwin from inside him. Later, Professor X recruits Rachel, along with Havok, Nightcrawler, Warpath, Darwin, and Polaris, for a space mission to stop Vulcan from laying waste to the Shi'ar empire. Aware of Rachel's vendetta against the Shi'ar, Professor X intends to uncover who ordered the murder of the Grey family.

While in space, the team is attacked by Korvus, a Shi'ar warrior sent to kill Rachel. Korvus' ancestor, Rook'shir, was a previous host of the Phoenix Force, and a small portion of the Phoenix's power was left behind in his sword, the Blade of the Phoenix. With this power, Korvus makes short work of the other X-Men; when Rachel blocks the sword, their minds are involuntarily linked. Through this link, Rachel learns that Korvus' family was also murdered by the Shi'ar government because of their connection to the Phoenix. The remaining echo of the Phoenix power from the sword was then transferred to Rachel. Rachel claimed that rather than having taken the power, the power chose to go to her.

Due to Rachel's connection to Korvus through the sword, she discovers the Phoenix Force formerly in the blade is just an echo, a "blue shadow", of the Force. The shadow of the Phoenix begins influencing Rachel's behavior, causing her to design a new darker uniform and begin a romance with Korvus. She soon breaks off the relationship after she realizes their bond is only because of the residual Phoenix Force.

After the death of Corsair at the hands of Vulcan, she, along with Havok, Polaris, Korvus, Ch'od, and Raza Longknife, form a new version of the Starjammers. They elect to remain in Shi'ar space and restore Lilandra to the throne or die trying. Rachel, Korvus, Havok, and Polaris, eventually returned to Earth.

=== Age of X ===
While on the way back to Earth, Rachel attempted to contact Professor Xavier or Emma Frost with a message. However at that moment, Moira (a powerful alternate personality of the mutant Legion) warps reality, taking Rachel's mind with it and creating the amnesic Revenant. Once reality is restored, Rachel's mind is separated from her body. Because of Moira's actions, Rachel no longer remembers the message and her mind retains the form of her Age of X counterpart. Rachel is then invited to hold a position as senior staff member of the "Jean Grey School for Higher Learning," which was rebuilt from the Xavier Institute and has Wolverine as acting Headmaster and Kitty Pryde as Headmistress.

==== Avengers vs. X-Men ====
During the events of AVX, when the X-Men on Utopia escape from the invading Avengers, Rachel contacts Cyclops to provide Hope's location. Afterwards, Rachel states that she knows the Phoenix Force better than anyone else on Earth and that she is living proof that it can be controlled. She also says that if the Phoenix has chosen her and that is the destiny that Hope wants, she will do everything in her power to help her. She and Iceman tell Wolverine at the school that they are going to help Cyclops in the battle. However, when Cyclops and Emma Frost begin to be corrupted by the Phoenix's power, she, like the other X-Men, decide to oppose their rule. Rachel then battled against Cyclops and helped both the Avengers and X-Men in the final battle.

==== Marvel NOW! and Inhuman war ====
In 2013, Marvel revealed an all new all female series simply named X-Men. Written by Brian Wood with art by Olivier Coipel, X-Men features Storm, Jubilee, Rogue, Kitty Pryde, Rachel Grey, and Psylocke. When Kitty returns from space to lead the X-Men, Rachel joins her team in X-Men Gold and adopts the new code name Prestige.

=== Dawn of X ===
In the new status quo for mutants post House of X and Powers of X, Professor X and Magneto invite all mutants to live on Krakoa and welcome even former enemies into their fold. Rachel spends some time with her family on the Summer House, the new residence of the Summers Family, located on the Moon. Soon after X (Xavier) is killed by bioengineered human terrorists, Cyclops gathers Rachel and Kid Cable for a mission on the Atlantic Ocean regarding a piece of their new homeland of Krakoa.

Later, she joins Polaris, Daken, Northstar, and former X-students Eye-Boy and Prodigy in a new initiative in Krakoa: they are to investigate any mutant death and prepare a report for the Five as part of the Resurrection Protocols of Krakoa. Their first case involves the supposed death of Northstar's twin sister, Aurora.

== Powers and abilities ==
Rachel possesses various psionic abilities, generally exhibited through telepathy, psychometry, telekinesis, and limited time manipulation.

=== Telepathy ===
Rachel's "virtually unlimited" telepathy allows her to receive, broadcast, and manipulate cognitive processes (such as thoughts) in an intricate manner. Examples of Rachel's aptitudes for this include creating durable mind-links across distances, projecting blasts of psionic energy that disrupt aspects of brain functioning, shielding her mind from other telepaths, creating illusions, and rendering someone imperceptible to the five senses. In addition, Rachel has demonstrated the ability to telepathically suppress superpowers; control, repair, and exchange minds; as well as safely editing memories. Rachel has also harnessed her telepathy to sense, locate, and track other sentient beings based on their thought patterns, but has a moral apprehension about using this skill due to her experiences as a Hound.

It has been suggested that Rachel's telepathy, although immeasurable in raw power, is mitigated by her limited training and finesse. Emma Frost was able to outflank an incredulous Rachel in a contest on the astral plane. In the same issue, Emma offered her educative services; and later still, Rachel received training from Professor Charles Xavier (while he was depowered), giving her access to his vast knowledge and expertise in telepathy.

=== Telekinesis ===
By using telekinesis, Marvel Girl can remotely manipulate matter even on a sub-atomic level. She can channel this ability to create protective force fields and blasts of concussive force. By using her telekinesis to levitate herself, Marvel Girl can fly at incredible speeds. Rachel has been able to create a micro black hole, levitate an entire city for a time, sustain shields that withstood Jovian atmospheric pressures, and direct blows from Thor's hammer, Mjolnir. Moreover, Rachel's telekinetic fine-motor control has allowed her to alter molecular valences, mentally alter clothing with ease, create a telekinetic/psionic sword (much like Psylocke's telekinetic katana), a telekinetic hammer powerful enough to knock Thor off his feet, and even rewrite human genomes.

While all depictions portray Rachel as an extremely powerful telekinetic, the limitations of her hard-psi capabilities have been somewhat inconsistent. Some instances have depicted Rachel's telekinetic potential to be nigh-unlimited, whereas others have shown her struggling against, and even outmatched by, lesser developed telekinetics such as Psylocke.

=== Chronoskimming ===
Marvel Girl utilizes her psionic talents in conjunction with her ability to manipulate time in a variety of ways. "Chronoskimming" describes her ability to temporarily transplant a person's mind and send it through time into a younger/older version, a close ancestor/descendant, or as a disembodied astral form. Rachel unconsciously emanates a fourth dimensional pulse, effectively creating a chrono-shield that protects her from changes in the timeline. She can also sense and manipulate residual psychic energy in the form of psychometry.

Rachel Summers, with the Phoenix Force, battling and winning against Galactus. Art by Alan Davis.

=== Phoenix Force ===
When Rachel was bonded to the cosmic entity known as the Phoenix Force, she demonstrated heightened psi-powers, the ability to manipulate energy and life-forces, and limited cosmic awareness. Rachel's connection to the Phoenix power was lost in the distant future and did not return with her when she traveled back to the early 21st century (present) of Earth-616 (Marvel's mainstream universe).

Most recently, Marvel Girl absorbed a residual echo of the Phoenix Force left in the sword of a previous host, a Shi'ar named Rook'shir. It was revealed that this energy source was a less powerful (but easier to wield) form of the Phoenix Force. The echo was powerful enough to allow Rachel to survive in and fly through the vacuum of space without the need for additional protection, as well as being able to hold her own in combat against the tremendous physical power of Gladiator. These demonstrations were short lived, however, due to its disappearance, which Rachel attributes to Jean Grey. She now exhibits her standard power levels, however she has later shown the ability to manipulate Phoenix Fire from the Multiverse.

=== Power signature ===
As a host for the Phoenix Force, Rachel manifested the cosmic firebird in displays of great power. During her 2000s Uncanny X-Men appearances, Marvel Girl also exhibited a Phoenix emblem over her left eye whenever she demonstrated psionic feats. It was at first accompanied by a "shadow form" (similar to the one Jean Grey manifested when she absorbed the telepathic powers of Psylocke). However, the illustration of this shadow form ceased without explanation. After regaining a small portion of the Phoenix Force (echo), the emblem over her eye changed from a gold Phoenix shape to a static version made of electric blue flame. Her display of power was once more altered in X-Men: Emperor Vulcan #3, where she produced the familiar fiery raptor with which the Phoenix Force is commonly associated (see profile image).

=== Skills and abilities ===
At times, Rachel has been shown to learn new skills extremely quickly. For example, she mastered a set of "demon ninja" sword skills simply by watching her teammate Shadowcat perform them. Along with sword fighting, Rachel has experience in lock-picking, vehicular repair (such as engines), and use of advanced technology and weaponry. However, these abilities have not been evident in her more recent appearances.

=== Potential and limitations ===
Rachel's power level and scope of abilities have been inconsistently described by writers over the years. However, she is usually depicted with "virtually unlimited" potential in her dual psionic talents. In most cases, she displayed greater feats as the Phoenix and even matched Gladiator's strength with the aid of a "Phoenix echo". Rachel is considered by many to be an Omega-level mutant (like her mother), but the only literary reference to this attribute is when the future Sentinel, Nimrod, classified Rachel as an "Omega class subject" several years before the term was established in Marvel canon.

Even with the omnipotent strength of the Phoenix, magic and magical objects are able to resist Rachel's powers. When the Soulsword appeared near the Excalibur lighthouse headquarters seeking Kitty Pryde to become its new wielder, Rachel attempted to remove it from bedrock to alleviate her friend's apprehension. Despite using the full extent of power permitted by the Phoenix Force, Rachel was unable to remove the sword, surmising that only Kitty could remove it.

== Reception ==
=== Accolades ===
- In 2014, Entertainment Weekly ranked Rachel Summers 98th in their "Let's rank every X-Man ever" list.
- In 2018, CBR.com ranked Rachel Summers 4th in their "X-Men: The Strongest Members Of The Summers Family" list.
- In 2018, CBR.com ranked Phoenix/Rachel Summers 13th in their "8 X-Men Kids Cooler Than Their Parents (And 7 Who Are Way Worse)" list.
- In 2018, CBR.com ranked Rachel Summers 3rd in their "20 Most Powerful Mutants From The '80s" list.
- In 2019, CBR.com ranked Rachel Summers 1st in their "X-Men: The 10 Most Dangerous Members Of The Starjammers" list.
- In 2021 Screen Rant ranked Rachel Summers 2nd in their "X-Men: The Top 10 Telepathic Mutants" list and 5th in their "X-Men: The 10 Most Powerful Members Of The Summers Family" list.
- In 2021, CBR.com ranked Rachel Summers 9th in their "10 Bravest Mutants in Marvel Comics" list.
- In 2022, Newsarama included Rachel Summers in their "20 X-Men characters that should make the jump from Marvel comics to the MCU" list.
- In 2022, CBR.com ranked Rachel Summers 8th in their "10 Best Marvel Legacy Heroes" list.
- In 2022, Screen Rant ranked Rachel Summers 1st in their "10 Most Powerful Members Of Excalibur" list, 3rd in their "10 Most Powerful Alternate Universe Members Of The X-Men" list, and included her in their "10 Most Powerful X-Men" list and in their "10 Most Iconic Alternate Future X-Men" list.

== Other versions ==
The Uncanny X-Men story arc "Season of the Witch" establishes that Rachel Summers has no true alternate counterparts within the Marvel multiverse. Rather, all other incarnations of Rachel Summers that exist in parallel timelines are linked only by having the same name or attributes.

=== House of M ===
In House of M, Rachel Summers is the bodyguard and traveling companion of Betsy Braddock.

=== Variations of Days of Future Past ===
In at least three alternate future timelines derived from "Days of Future Past", Rachel Summers married Franklin Richards and had several mutant children, among them the villain Hyperstorm. The second child is Dream Summers, who appeared in the Spider-Man/X-Men: Time's Arrow trilogy of novels. In a third reality, Rachel has a son named David Richards, who was rescued from a concentration camp by the interdimensional traveling Exiles and raised by the "Age of Apocalypse" version of Sabretooth. David's traumatic experiences at the camp motivated him to become a fanatical murderer.

In another variation of the "Days of Future Past", shown in Weapon X: Days of Future Now, Rachel Summers is captured by Weapon X and detained in the concentration camp Neverland.

=== Exiles ===
In the so-called "Legacy Earth" reality of Exiles, in which the Legacy Virus mutated into a techno-organic plague, Rachel Summers is a member of the Avengers.

=== X-Men: The End ===
The miniseries X-Men: The End (written by Chris Claremont) details the last adventures of the X-Men in a possible future. In this reality, Rachel played a central role, and was the political campaign manager of Kitty Pryde (Chicago mayoral candidate). Rachel is later killed by Cassandra Nova, who takes the Phoenix Force from her.

== In other media ==
=== Television ===
- Rachel Summers as Hound makes a non-speaking cameo appearance in the X-Men: The Animated Series episode "Beyond Good and Evil, Part 4".
- Rachel Summers as Mother Askani appears in X-Men '97, voiced by Gates McFadden.

=== Video games ===
- Rachel Summers as the Phoenix appears as a playable character in X-Men II: The Fall of the Mutants.
- Rachel Grey appears as a playable character in X-Men: Battle of the Atom.
- Rachel Summers as Marvel Girl appears as a playable character in Marvel Future Fight.

=== Miscellaneous ===
- Rachel Summers as Marvel Girl and Rachel Grey has received several figures from Hasbro and WizKids.
- Rachel Summers received busts from Diamond Select.
- Rachel Summers received a figure in the HeroClix line.
- Rachel Summers as Marvel Girl received a figure in the "Marvel Super Hero Squad" line as part of a two-pack with Cyclops.
