= War of Kings =

2009 comic book storyline by Marvel Comics

- Cover of War of Kings 1 (May 2009), art by Brandon Peterson
- Publisher: Marvel Comics
- Publication date: March – August 2009
- Genre: Science fiction, space opera, superhero crossover
Title(s)
Guardians of the Galaxy Vol. 2, #8–17
Nova Vol. 4, #23–28
Secret Invasion: War of Kings #1
War of Kings #1–6
War of Kings: Ascension #1–4
War of Kings: Darkhawk #1–2
X-Men: Kingbreaker #1–4
War of Kings: Warriors #1–2
War of Kings: The Savage World of Skaar #1
War of Kings: Who Will Rule? #1
- Main character(s): Shi'ar; Inhumans; Kree; Guardians of the Galaxy; Starjammers; Nova; Darkhawk

Creative team
- Writer(s): Dan Abnett (Guardians of the Galaxy, Nova, Secret Invasion: War of Kings, War of Kings); C. B. Cebulski (War of Kings: Darkhawk); Andy Lanning (Guardians of the Galaxy, Nova, Secret Invasion: War of Kings, War of Kings); Christopher Yost (X-Men: Kingbreaker)
- Penciller(s): Wellington Alves (Nova, War of Kings: Ascension); Wesley Craig (Guardians of the Galaxy); Bong Dazo (Guardians of the Galaxy); Andrea Di Vito (Nova); Paul Pelletier (Guardians of the Galaxy, Secret Invasion: War of Kings, War of Kings); Harvey Tolibao (War of Kings: Darkhawk); Brad Walker (Guardians of the Galaxy); Dustin Weaver (X-Men: Kingbreaker)
- Road to War of Kings: ISBN 0-7851-3967-2
- Guardians of the Galaxy: Book 1: ISBN 0-7851-3339-9
- Guardians of the Galaxy: Book 2: ISBN 0-7851-4127-8
- War of Kings: ISBN 0-7851-3542-1
- Ascension: ISBN 0-7851-4170-7
- Nova: ISBN 0-7851-4066-2

"War of Kings" is a comic book crossover storyline written by Dan Abnett and Andy Lanning, published by Marvel Comics, and set in Marvel's main shared universe. The six-issue limited series was published between March and August 2009.

The story is about a war between the Vulcan-led Shi'ar empire and the Inhuman-led Kree empire. The Guardians of the Galaxy, Nova Corps, Darkhawk, and the Starjammers become involved in various ways. Its tagline is "When kings collide, the galaxy will tremble".

== Publication history ==
On July 18, 2008, Marvel.com posted a news article featuring a modified cover of Emperor Vulcan with the phrase "Who Will Rule?", accompanied by the text "Stay tuned to Marvel.com and get ready for the blockbuster answer at San Diego Comic-Con!" At the SDCC, it was announced that this was part of the build-up to the War of Kings, an outer-space storyline focusing on the X-Men family of characters rather than the cosmic entities. The core series was written by Dan Abnett and Andy Lanning and edited by Bill Rosemann.

The event started in December 2008 with the mini-series X-Men: Kingbreaker and continued in the Secret Invasion: War of Kings one-shot (Jan 2009) and War of Kings #1-6 (Mar - Aug 2009). Abnett and Lanning tied the main series into their other titles, Guardians of the Galaxy and Nova (vol 4). C. B. Cebulski wrote two other tie-in mini-series, War of Kings: Darkhawk and War of Kings: Ascension. A series on Marvel Digital Comics, War of the Kings: Warriors by Christos Gage and Jay Faerber, tied into the storyline and featured different stories focusing on Gladiator, Blastaar, Lilandra Neramani, and Crystal. These four stories were later collected and published as War of Kings: Warriors 1-2.

== Plot summary ==
=== Main series ===
In the aftermath of the Secret Invasion storyline, Black Bolt and the Inhumans return to the Kree for their right to lineage as rulers. They come into direct conflict with Emperor Vulcan and his campaign of expansion for the Shi'ar. The first issue sets up this conflict and shows an attack at the wedding of Ronan the Accuser and Crystal - a betrothal arranged by Black Bolt to unite the two races, resolve ancient hostilities, and provide common defense against mutual enemies. The Inhumans and Kree reply in kind, attacking the Shi'ar in the following issue.

The Gladiator of the Shi'ar Imperial Guard leads the assault against the Inhumans. As Crystal of the Inhuman Royal Family and Ronan the Accuser are about to be married to unite the Inhumans with the Kree, they are attacked by Gladiator and the Guard. Gladiator takes on Black Bolt and is able to defeat him with some help from White Noise. The Guard also captures Princess Lilandra who is with the Kree and Inhumans. Ronan also falls as he tries to help Crystal. Gladiator says that they have made their statement, and the Imperial Guard leaves. Medusa shouts that the Shi'ar will pay with their blood for what they have done.

Gladiator and the Guard face off against the new batch of Nova Centurions, whom they quickly defeat. Gladiator's cousin, Xenith, shows up, informing him that the Emperor has ordered Gladiator to present Lilandra to him. Gladiator quickly leaves, though he clearly shows his dislike for his cousin and her presence. Gladiator walks a fine line in doing his duty for an emperor he personally dislikes while still protecting Lilandra from his wrath. Later, the Starjammers, accompanied by a faction of the Guardians of the Galaxy, attack Gladiator's ship to extract Lilandra. He is taken out of the fight by Rocket Raccoon, aided by Marvel Girl, until he sees through their trick. He quickly defeats the rest of their team and recaptures Lilandra before she can escape. She pleads with him again but another guard interrupts her and demands that Gladiator do as the Emperor ordered and kill Lilandra and the others.

After battling the Starjammers and the Guardians of the Galaxy, Gladiator is swayed by Lilandra's argument against Vulcan and kills a member of the Imperial Guard loyal to the Emperor, saying that he is loyal to Lilandra. In the next issue, Lilandra is killed by Darkhawk's Razor persona. Gladiator goes crazy and begins to attack all of his enemies. Vulcan and Black Bolt battle on a ship or bomb. Black Bolt has the final strike and seemingly kills Vulcan. As Crystal and Lockjaw are about to take Black Bolt away, Vulcan gets up and pushes Black Bolt to the ground. Just as Lockjaw and Crystal escape, their ship blows up and both kings are seemingly killed. Back on the Shi'ar home planet, Gladiator becomes the new emperor. Also, the explosion from the ship has literally made a hole in the fabric of space and time. This rift is actually the event that Starhawk (in Guardians of the Galaxy) was trying to prevent. The Shi'ar fleet, suffering from the explosion, surrenders to the Inhumans, but the price is too high.

=== The Fraternity of Raptors ===
A second wearer of Darkhawk armor, calling himself Talon, arrives on Earth and tells Chris Powell (the original wearer of the armor) he is part of an ancient organization known as "The Fraternity of Raptors," who were created to protect the universe. After millennia of dormancy, only Darkhawk and Talon are left, and their job now is to return the balance to the universe. Unfortunately for Chris, Talon has lied—when Chris accesses the memories in his armor, he concludes that the Fraternity of Raptors are the bad guys as Talon apparently purges Chris's consciousness from the armor. A new identity for the armor, "Razor," emerges and takes control.

Talon and Razor then recover the Cosmic Control Rod from Catastrophus, stopping briefly for Talon to implant a suggestion in the gestating Annihilus. Chris's personality was not wholly destroyed yet, and a vision of his father tells him that much of what he believed about the armor was false: the prior history, even Evilhawk himself, was a lie made up by Chris's mind, and the other armor is a second configuration that took control to cover earlier anger issues. Horrified, Chris' psyche breaks free of the prison in which it was locked, only for Chris to find himself on a great tree adorned with thousands of amulets like his own, where he encounters gargoyle-like creatures that urge him to return to the one from which he has just emerged. Meanwhile, in the Negative Zone, Talon and Razor offer Blastaar the Cosmic Control Rod in exchange for his assistance influencing the outcome of the War of Kings. Talon then appears to Vulcan, telling him that the fraternity was created in order to keep the Imperium strong. Talon also tells him, through the Datasong, that Blastaar is helping the Shi'ar, and also tells him of Lilandra's coup on Chandilar. Razor is later seen on Chandilar, disguised as a Shi'ar. Although Rachel Grey manages to see his true form, he shoots several Shi'ar before he kills Lilandra.

=== The Nova Corps ===
The newly reformed and under-trained Nova Corps suffers great casualties facing the Shi'ar Imperial Guard. When Nova's brother, Robbie, attempts to rescue a fellow corpsman he had befriended, he finds himself needing rescue. Nova and some more experienced centurions rescue Robbie and take Strontian and Ravenous into custody. The Kree territory that had been under Ravenous' control is left to "King" Blastarr.

=== The Guardians of the Galaxy ===
In an attempt to prevent, and then stop, the war, the Guardians of the Galaxy split into two groups. The team led by Rocket Raccoon tries to communicate with Vulcan, and Star-Lord's team appeals to the Inhumans. Neither group has had any success.

== Tie-ins ==
December 2008:

- X-Men: Kingbreaker #1
- Guardians of the Galaxy #8

January 2009:

- Secret Invasion: War of Kings
- War of Kings Saga
- Guardians of the Galaxy #9
- X-Men: Kingbreaker #2

February 2009:

- War of Kings: Darkhawk #1
- Guardians of the Galaxy #10
- X-Men: Kingbreaker #3

March 2009:

- War of Kings #1
- War of Kings: Darkhawk #2
- X-Men: Kingbreaker #4
- Guardians of the Galaxy #11
- Guardians of the Galaxy #12
- Nova #23

April 2009:

- War of Kings #2
- War of Kings: Ascension #1
- Guardians of the Galaxy #13
- Nova #24

May 2009:

- War of Kings #3
- War of Kings: Ascension #2
- Guardians of the Galaxy #14
- Nova #25

June 2009:

- War of Kings #4
- War of Kings: Ascension #3
- War of Kings: The Savage World of Skaar
- Guardians of the Galaxy #15
- Nova #26

July 2009:

- War of Kings #5
- War of Kings: Ascension #4
- War of Kings: Warriors #1
- Guardians of the Galaxy #16
- Nova #27

August 2009:

- War of Kings #6
- War of Kings: Warriors #2
- Guardians of the Galaxy #17
- Nova #28

September 2009:

- War of Kings: Who Will Rule?

== Aftermath: Realm of Kings ==
Following the conclusion of War of Kings in August 2009 the one-shot War of Kings: Who Will Rule? was published, which served as an epilogue to War of Kings as well as setting the stage for Realm of Kings.

Realm of Kings began with an eponymous one-shot in November 2009 and continued with three mini-series Realm of Kings: Inhumans, Realm of Kings: Imperial Guard and Realm of Kings: Son of Hulk. As with War of Kings both Nova and Guardians of the Galaxy also tied into the event with Nova #31-35 and Guardians of the Galaxy #20-24.

== Collected editions ==
Title	Material collected	Published date	ISBN
War of Kings: Road to War of Kings	X-Men: Kingbreaker #1-4, Secret Invasion: War of Kings, War of Kings Saga	June 2009	978-0785139676
War of Kings Prelude: Road to War of Kings Omnibus	Son of M #1-6, X-Men: Deadly Genesis #1-6, Silent War #1-6, Secret Invasion: Inhumans #1-4, Guardians of the Galaxy (vol. 2) #1-12, Nova (vol. 4) #13-22, Nova: The Origin of Richard Rider, War of Kings Saga	April 2017	978-1302904463
War of Kings (TPB)	War of Kings #1-6, War of Kings: Who Will Rule? #1, Marvel Spotlilght: War of Kings	May 2010	978-0785135425
War of Kings (HC)	War of Kings #1-6, War of Kings: Ascension #1-4, War of Kings: Savage World of Sakaar #1, War of Kings: Darkhawk #1-2, War of Kings: Warriors #1-2, War of Kings: Who Will Rule? #1, Marvel Spotlilght: War of Kings	December 2009	978-0785142935
Guardians Of The Galaxy Volume 2: War Of Kings Book 1	Guardians of the Galaxy (vol. 2) #7-12	January 2010	978-0785141273
Guardians Of The Galaxy Volume 3: War Of Kings Book 2	Guardians of the Galaxy (vol. 2) #13-17, Marvel Spotlight: War of Kings	January 2010	978-0785140481
Nova Volume 5: War of Kings	Nova (vol. 4) #23-29	November 2009	978-0785140665
War Of Kings: Warriors	War of Kings: Darkhawk #1-2, War of Kings: Ascension #1-4, War of Kings: Savage Sword of Skaar, War of Kings: Warriors #1-2	June 2010	978-0785143680
War of Kings Omnibus	Uncanny X-Men #475-486, X-Men: Emperor Vulcan #1-5, Secret Invasion: War of Kings #1, X-Men: Kingbreaker #1-4, War of Kings: Darkhawk #1-2, War of Kings: Warriors #1-2, War of Kings #1-6, War of Kings: Ascension #1-4, War of Kings: Savage World of Sakaar #1, Nova (vol. 4) #23-28, Guardians of the Galaxy (vol. 2) #13-19, War of Kings: Who Will Rule? #1, Marvel Spotlilght: War of Kings, material from X-Men: Divided We Stand #2	November 2016	978-1302945671

== See also ==
- Major events of the Marvel Universe
