= Lilandra Neramani =

Marvel Comics fictional character

- Cover art to New X-Men #122 (March 2002); Art by Frank Quitely (pencils), Tim Townsend (inks), and Hi-Fi Design (colors)

Publication information
- Publisher: Marvel Comics
- First appearance: The Uncanny X-Men #97 (February 1976)
- Created by: Chris Claremont; Dave Cockrum

In-story information
- Alter ego: Lilandra Neramani
- Species: Shi'ar
- Place of origin: Aerie
- Team affiliations: Shi'ar Imperium; Starjammers
- Abilities: Limited telepathy Shi'ar armor and ceremonial staff

Princess-Majestrix Lilandra Neramani (/lɪˈlændrə/) is a character appearing in American comic books published by Marvel Comics, most commonly in association with the X-Men. She is the Empress, or Majestrix, of the Shi'ar Empire and shares a lifelong bond with the leader of the X-Men, Charles Xavier. As the Empress, Lilandra is protected by the Imperial Guard, led by Gladiator.

Lilandra has often been a pivotal secondary character in the X-Men's history, from her participation in the Phoenix Saga, to her role in Grant Morrison's experimental and controversial run on New X-Men. Her role as one of Professor X's most cherished loves has played a significant part in the development of both characters, as well as many of the plots throughout the X-Men books.

Lilandra has appeared in various media outside comics, including animated series and video games. She was voiced by Kristina Nicoll in X-Men: The Animated Series, Morla Gorrondona in the sequel series X-Men '97, and Nika Futterman in a guest appearance in Hulk and the Agents of S.M.A.S.H.

== Publication history ==
Lilandra Neramani first appeared in X-Men #97 (February 1976) and was created by Chris Claremont and Dave Cockrum. She continued to appear in the series as an ally of the X-Men throughout the late 1970s and early 1980s, frequently residing at the X-Mansion.

After her return to space, she would continue to make appearances as part of the Shi'ar Empire, appearing in Operation: Galactic Storm, and Starjammers, among others, throughout the 1990s. In the 2000s, Lilandra appeared in New X-Men, Uncanny X-Men, as well as the limited series X-Men: Emperor Vulcan. She also appeared in the crossover book War of Kings before her death in the fourth issue. Years after her death, Xavier resurrects Lilandra using a Krakoan egg.

== Fictional character biography ==
Lilandra is the sibling of D'Ken, Deathbird, and an unnamed older sister. Lilandra was hatched on the Aerie (now known as Chandilar), the homeworld of the Shi'ar. Deathbird, the oldest of the surviving three, is denied the throne and exiled after she murders her mother and older sister. The throne is given to D'Ken, who becomes a power mad dictator. Lilandra becomes a Grand Admiral of the Imperial Guard in the Shi'ar fleet, but turns against D'Ken after learning of his plans involving the M'Kraan Crystal. Branded a traitor, Lilandra flees to Earth, hoping to find allies among its large population of superheroes and found them in Charles Xavier and his X-Men. She sends visions of herself to Xavier as she travels to Earth. Finally meeting Xavier in person, Lilandra is captured by Davan Shakari before being rescued by the X-Men and the Starjammers. She invites Xavier to accompany her to the Shi'ar throne-world.

=== Majestrix-in-Exile ===
Lilandra takes the throne as Majestrix-Shi'ar (empress of the Shi'ar Imperium), with Xavier as her consort. She stages a trial by combat to determine the fate of Phoenix and overcomes Deathbird's first attempted coup. A short while later, her position is usurped by Deathbird, who had made a pact with the Brood and Badoon. She escapes along with the X-Men to Earth. Lilandra becomes a freedom fighter and allies with the Starjammers to retake her throne.

=== Trial of Reed Richards ===
As monarch, Lilandra reasserts the Shi'ar empire's former role in intergalactic affairs, leading an alliance of worlds in dealing with the threat posed by the Dark Phoenix. She also indicts Reed Richards of the Fantastic Four for daring to save the life of the planet consumer, Galactus, placing him on trial before the peoples who have suffered from Galactus' hunger. Uatu intervenes, forcing Lilandra and her court to temporarily possess omniscience so they can understand the role of Galactus in maintaining the cosmic order.

=== Return to the throne ===
When Charles Xavier suffers a near-fatal heart attack, the Starjammers heal him, but due to enemy spacecraft, they cannot return to Earth. With the help of Xavier and the Starjammers, Lilandra manages to retake the throne and separates from Xavier.

=== Kree-Shi'ar War ===
With the help of Xavier and the Starjammers, Lilandra retakes the throne and her exile is revoked. She is freed from control by the Warskrulls and parts with Xavier.

Soon afterward, interstellar war erupts between the Shi'ar and the Kree. Lilandra orders the Starjammers to transport the Nega-Bomb into Kree space. She survives an assassination attempt by the Kree Starforce, and decides to recall the Bomb before discovering that a Skrull impersonating Araki helped cause the Kree-Shi'ar War. At the end of the war, she takes control of the devastated Kree empire and appoints Deathbird as her viceroy. Fearing the Kree will seek retribution against the Avengers for their part in ending the war, Lilandra sends her niece Sharra, also known as Deathcry, to protect Earth.

=== Cassandra Nova ===
While Lilandra is a peaceful and beloved empress, her reign proves to be tumultuous. During her reign, the Skrull attempt to infiltrate and control the Shi'ar government, an intergalactic war with the Kree erupts, and the Phalanx and Uncreated attack. The most damage done to the Shi'ar empire is done by Cassandra Nova, who, in the body of Charles Xavier, mind-controls Lilandra and takes control of the Shi'ar fleet. Lilandra is lost for a while on Earth and attempts to kill Xavier, not understanding he has regained his body. Afterwards, Lilandra and Xavier's marriage is annulled.

As Lilandra is preparing to return to her duties as empress, she is ambushed by Chancellor Araki, who is revealed to be in league with the Shi'ar vice chancellor K'Tor and the Empire's Secret Order as part of a coup to remove Lilandra from the throne and make D'Ken emperor again. With the aid of a guard still loyal to her, Lilandra is rescued from captivity and tells the X-Men and the Starjammers of D'Ken's return.

=== Emperor Vulcan ===
This was all part of a plan by Vulcan, a powerful mutant, to gain control of the empire. During the incident, many members of the Imperial Guard are killed. D'Ken is soon killed after Vulcan officially marries Deathbird. Thus, Vulcan is now the ruler of the Shi'ar Imperium. Lilandra is in the company of the Starjammers, opposing Vulcan's tyranny. Most of the Starjammers are eventually captured by Vulcan. However, Korvus, Marvel Girl and Lilandra remain free.

=== X-Men: Kingbreaker & War of the Kings ===
Lilandra appears as a central character in the Emperor Vulcan sequel, X-Men: Kingbreaker and in the War of Kings miniseries, which began in early 2009. In issue #4 of War of Kings, Lilandra is assassinated by Darkhawk, who is being controlled by his Razor persona and has been impersonating a Shi'ar citizen. She dies in the arms of Gladiator.

=== Xandra ===
It was revealed in Mr. & Mrs. X #3 (September, 2018) that following Lilandra's death, the Shi'ar used her genetic material and combined it with Xavier's, creating a binary clone who believes that she is the child of Xavier and Lilandra. The child grows in an egg and was cared for by Cerise, who eventually reaches out to Rogue and Gambit on their honeymoon to help her defend Xandra from the likes of the Imperial Guard, Technet, and Deadpool. She is protected by the group of heroes and left with the Starjammers. Xandra goes on to lead the Shi'ar as the new Majestrix.

=== Krakoan resurrection egg ===
After Shi'ar rebels attack Xandra, she reaches out her father Xavier for help which prompts him to escape Graymalkin Prison during the crossover event storyline X-Manhunt (March 2025). He teams up with Storm to reach San Francisco's Utopia and battles both Cyclops's X-Men and X-Factor to obtain the last Krakoa resurrection egg. After feigning being kidnapped, Xavier is extracted by Sage so he can begin to hatch the egg. This egg contains Lilandra's body, which Xavier had The Five secretly create during the Krakoan Age. Using his telepathy, Xavier restores her memories, and upon learning of Xandra's danger, Lilandra agrees to help. Boarding a VTOL vehicle, the couple prepares to aid their daughter while evading the X-Men.

== Powers and abilities ==
As a Shi'ar, Lilandra has heightened strength and stamina to that of a human. Lilandra also has limited telepathic abilities whose extent have yet to be clearly defined.

Lilandra is a skilled hand-to-hand combatant and pilot and wields various Shi'ar weaponry.

== Reception ==
Screen Rant ranked Lilandra 9th on "The 10 Most Powerful Members Of The Xavier Family", 6th on the "11 Most Dangerous Shi'ar Warriors in Marvel History" and as one of the "Best Non-Mutant Supporting Characters". CBR ranked Lilandra 9th on "The 10 Most Powerful Shi'ar".

Ramzi Fawaz, in the academic journal American Literature in 2011, opined that "arguably the most canonical storyline in the X-Men's publishing history, 'The Phoenix Saga' tells the story of the alien princess Lilandra Nermani's desperate effort to gain allies in a cosmic struggle against the machinations of her tyrannical brother, D'Ken". Fawaz highlighted that "in her time of need, Lilandra discovers a psychic rapport across the galaxies that leads her to Earth and Xavier's X-Men, calling forth a monstrous mutant kinship against the tainted bonds of blood and empire". Fawaz, in the book New Mutants: Superheroes and the Radical Imagination of American Comics (2016), highlighted "The Dark Phoenix Saga", noting that "if the Hellfire Club stands in for the machinations of global capital, the Shi'ar Empire functions as its political double, representing the corruption of governmental power by the interests of economic imperialism". Fawaz highlighted that Lilandra "dramatizes the threat Dark Phoenix" and "disavows the Shi'ar Empire's own imperialist claim to the galaxy by equating Jean with a political tyrant, her brother D'Ken, while basing the value of Jean's life on her level of 'benecence' or lack thereof to the Shi'ar Empire".

Arnold T. Blumberg of IGN commented that "takeaway" of Lilandra "is that she has a convoluted backstory" and noted her deep impact "in Marvel cosmic history". He highlighted that she "overthrew D'Ken", married Xavier, "assumed her position as Empress Majestrix, eventually presiding over the proceedings that led to the death of Phoenix; she also played a part in putting Reed Richards of the Fantastic Four on trial for saving Galactus' life".

== Other versions ==
=== MC2 ===
An alternate, older version of Lilandra appears in MC2's miniseries "Last Planet Standing". There, the Shi'ar empire is devastated by Galactus and Lilandra's Imperial Guard help her and her servants escape right before Galactus destroys the empire. It is unknown what happened to Lilandra afterward.

=== Ultimate Marvel ===
Ultimate Lilandra. Art by Tom Raney.

An alternate universe version of Lilandra Neramani from Earth-1610 appears in Ultimate X-Men. This version is the human leader of the Church of Shi'ar Enlightenment, and claims to represent an ancient religion that worships the Phoenix.

=== X-Men: The End ===
An alternate universe version of Lilandra Neramani from Earth-41001 appears in X-Men: The End.

== In other media ==
=== Television ===
- Lilandra Neramani appears in X-Men: The Animated Series, voiced by Kristina Nicoll.
  - Lilandra Neramani returns in X-Men '97, voiced by Morla Gorrondona.
- Lilandra Neramani appears in the Hulk and the Agents of S.M.A.S.H. episode "It's a Wonderful Smash", voiced by Nika Futterman.

=== Video games ===
- Lilandra Neramani appears in X-Men.
- Lilandra Neramani appears in the PlayStation Portable version of X-Men Legends II: Rise of Apocalypse.
- Lilandra Neramani appears in Marvel: Ultimate Alliance, voiced by Marabina Jaimes. An optional quest involves whether the player saves her from imprisonment after she is overthrown by Deathbird. If Lilandra is rescued, the Shi'ar give Earth advanced technology to wipe out all diseases and hunger and eventually colonize other planets. If the player does not, the Shi'ar will ignore the plea of Earth's heroes when an asteroid approaches Earth and the heroes' failure to stop the asteroid results in the Western coast of the United States being obliterated.
- Lilandra Neramani makes a cameo appearance in Marvel's Guardians of the Galaxy.
- Lilandra Neramani appears as a playable character in Marvel Strike Force.

=== Miscellaneous ===
- Lilandra Neramani appears in Marvel TL;DR, voiced by Olivia Dei Cicchi.
- Lilandra Neramani appears in X-Men: Empire's End (1997), written by Diane Duane.
- In 2021, HeroClix created a figure of Lilandra Neramani for the X-Men Rise and Fall line. In 2024, Hasbro released a figure of Lilandra Neramani as part of the Marvel Legends's Wolverine 50th Anniversary line.
