= Cyclops (Marvel Comics) =

Marvel Comics superhero

Scott Summers Cyclops
- Various incarnations of Cyclops, from a variant cover of House of X #1 (July 2019). Art by Marco Checchetto.

Publication information
- Publisher: Marvel Comics
- First appearance: The X-Men #1 (September 1963)
- Created by: Stan Lee (writer); Jack Kirby (artist/co-plotter)

In-story information
- Alter ego: Scott Summers
- Species: Human mutant
- Place of origin: Anchorage, Alaska, United States
- Team affiliations: X-Men; X-Force; X-Factor; Phoenix Five; X-Corporation; Hounds; Starjammers; Time-Displaced Cyclops: Champions
- Notable aliases: Slim; Slym Dayspring; Eric the Red; Mutate #007; Phoenix; Captain Krakoa
- Abilities: Optic energy blasts; Master tactician and strategist; Skilled martial artist and hand-to-hand combatant; Expert pilot

Cyclops is a superhero appearing in American comic books published by Marvel Comics. Created by writer Stan Lee and artist/co-plotter Jack Kirby, the character first appeared in The X-Men #1 (cover dated September 1963) as a founding member of the X-Men. Cyclops is a member of a subspecies of humans known as mutants, born with superhuman abilities. Cyclops emits powerful beams of energy from his eyes and cannot control the beams without the aid of special eyewear. He was the first member and field commander of the X-Men, a team of mutant heroes who fight for peace and equality between mutants and humans, and one of the team's primary leaders.

The first-born son of Corsair, Scott Summers is the older brother of Havok. His first and most enduring love interest is his wife, Jean Grey, with the two having a daughter, Rachel Summers, from an alternate future. Other significant love interests include his ex-wife Madelyne Pryor—a clone of Jean and mother of his son Cable—and fellow X-Men member Emma Frost. Cyclops' archenemy is Mister Sinister, who is obsessed with the Summers and Grey bloodlines and has often manipulated events in Cyclops' life, resulting in various clashes with the X-Men.

Cyclops was initially portrayed as a traditional heroic figure and counterposed to antiheroes who challenge authority. In later decades, he becomes increasingly morally ambiguous. Major Cyclops storylines include "The Dark Phoenix Saga" (1980), "Mutant Massacre" (1986), "X-Cutioner's Song" (1992–1993), and "Avengers vs. X-Men" (2012). He is also a central character in the company-wide stories "Messiah Complex" (2007–2008), "Utopia" (2009) and the Krakoan Age (2019–2024).

The character was portrayed by James Marsden, Tim Pocock, and Tye Sheridan in 20th Century Fox's X-Men films (2000–2019). Marsden will reprise the role in the Marvel Cinematic Universe (MCU) film Avengers: Doomsday (2026), ahead of Kit Connor debuting as a new iteration of Cyclops native to the MCU in the untitled X-Men film (2028).

== Publication history ==
=== 1960s ===
Cyclops first appeared in The X-Men #1 (September 1963). He was created by Stan Lee and Jack Kirby, and has been a mainstay character of the X-Men series. In the initial issue, Cyclops is introduced along with Beast, Iceman, Warren Worthington III, and Jean Grey as the students of Professor X, who battle Magneto. Lee said that Cyclops and Beast were his two favorite X-Men, elaborating that "I love tortured heroes—and he was tortured because he couldn't control his power." Originally identified as "Slim Summers", The X-Men #3 provides his first name as "Scott".

Scott Summers is the first of the X-Men recruited by Professor X; Xavier hand-picks Scott to lead his X-Men, and to carry on the legacy of his mutant-human-harmony ideals. In X-Men #7, Professor X briefly leaves the X-Men and leaves Cyclops in command. Ben Saunders observes that "the direction of the X-Men will often pivot on the question of Xavier's absence or presence, and the emotional impact of his comings and goings on the team, particularly on Cyclops." Xavier views Scott as one of his most prized pupils; their relationship exhibits father/son qualities. Douglas Wolk describes Cyclops as the "closest thing early X-Men has to a central protagonist," characterizing him as a "subdued, repressed young man." Later issues of X-Men of the mid-1960s written by Roy Thomas emphasize the subplot of the "melodramatic unrequited romance" between Scott Summers and Jean Grey. Cyclops appears in his first solo story in X-Men #45 (June 1968).

=== 1970s ===
In the early 1970s, X-Men only reprinted earlier issues. It was revived in 1975 by Len Wein and Dave Cockrum, creating a new international group. Cyclops was the only character who remained from the original team. Chris Claremont became the primary writer of the series with issue #94 (August 1975) and continued for the next sixteen years.

Cyclops and Jean Grey have a complex relationship, with Cyclops sometimes competing with Wolverine for her attention. In X-Men #98, Scott and Jean solidify their relationship when she initiates their first kiss. In this period, Clarement introduces a tension between the leadership responsibilities of Cyclops and the personal desires of Scott Summers. When Jean Grey becomes the Phoenix, Cyclops expresses fear and insecurity regarding her extraordinary power level.

Cockrum created the Starjammers, including Corsair, and collaborated with Claremont to develop the characters; they decided to make Corsair the father of Cyclops to tie them to the group. The Starjammers first appeared in X-Men #107 (October 1977).

=== 1980s ===
During The Dark Phoenix Saga (1980), Cyclops engages in competition with Mastermind (Jason Wyngarde) for the affections and destiny of Grey, with Wyngarde attempting to corrupt her. Grey appears to die at the conclusion of the story. Cyclops leaves the central team in The Uncanny X-Men #138 (October 1980), mourning Jean Grey; he remained a recurring character in the series. The Uncanny X-Men #141 (January 1981) introduces Rachel Summers, the daughter of Cyclops and Jean Grey from the alternate timeline of the Days of Future Past. She joins the X-Men in a storyline concluding in issue #199. Cyclops meets Madelyne Pryor, a woman who is mysteriously identical to Jean Grey; she first appears in Uncanny X-Men #168 (April 1983). He eventually marries and fathers a child with her.

In the mid-1980s, Storm becomes increasingly powerful and respected among the X-Men, challenging Cyclops' leadership role. In Uncanny X-Men #201 (January 1986), Cyclops cedes his leadership to her. Claremont intended Cyclops to retire from the superhero life and to settle into marriage and fatherhood. However, Marvel's editors decided that he should appear in a new series. This new series, X-Factor, launched in 1986 and starred the original X-Men team. Jean Grey is revealed to remain alive, while the Phoenix only assumed her form. Cyclops leaves his wife and child behind to lead the reunited original X-Men, under the X-Factor name. Claremont expressed dismay that Jean's resurrection ultimately resulted in Cyclops abandoning his wife and child, tarnishing his written persona as a hero and "decent human being". For X-Factor, writer Bob Layton was partly inspired by the film Ghostbusters; the X-Factor team advertised themselves as mutant hunters, but worked to rehabilitate and educate the mutants they discovered. Layton left the title after five issues and was replaced by Louise Simonson, who introduced the new villain Apocalypse, first appearing in X-Factor #6 (July 1986).

Mister Sinister, a geneticist who sometimes works with Apocalypse, first appears in Uncanny X-Men #221 (September 1987). Pryor is eventually revealed to be a clone of Jean Grey created by Mister Sinister, who has been meddling with the Summers family for decades. She displays mutant powers and becomes a villain named the Goblin Queen, seeking revenge for being jilted. Scott's son, Nathan, is infected with a techno-organic virus. Rachel Summers brings him to the future to be saved.

=== 1990s ===
Scott stayed with the X-Factor title through X-Factor #70. In October 1991, Summers returns to the X-Men to appear in a central role in a new title, X-Men #1. This series was the second of two X-Men titles and featured Cyclops, Wolverine, Beast, Gambit, Psylocke, and Rogue, as the "Blue team". The issue was a best-seller, written by Claremont with art by Jim Lee. Claremont left the title after the third issue, and Lee left Marvel by the end of the year. Scott Lobdell became the new writer. In the X-Cutioner's Song story line (1992-1993), Scott and Jean are captured by Mister Sinister and traded to a new villain, Stryfe. After escaping, they eventually discover that Cable is Nathan, the son of Scott and Madelyne Pryor, having grown up in a future timeline, and that Stryfe is Cable's clone. Cyclops and Jean Grey then marry, in X-Men vol. 2 #30 (March 1994). In summer 1994, Cyclops appeared in the four-issue miniseries The Adventures of Cyclops and Phoenix, which recounts how he and Jean Grey traveled to the future to raise Nathan Summers, explaining the childhood of Cable. In 1995, the X-titles were all replaced in a crossover taking place in an alternate future called Age of Apocalypse. An alternate version of Cyclops starred in a new title written by John Francis Moore titled Factor X. The decade concluded with a storyline called Apocalypse: The Twelve in which Apocalypse takes control of Cyclops' body.

=== 2000s ===
In 2000, Joe Harris wrote the four-issue run titled X-Men: The Search for Cyclops that dealt with Cyclops's return after merging with Apocalypse in Apocalypse: The Twelve.

In February 2001, an alternate version of Cyclops began appearing in a new ongoing series by Mark Millar, Ultimate X-Men. This version of Cyclops was killed off in January 2009.

In July 2001, Cyclops appeared as a leading character in New X-Men. Written by Grant Morrison, the series pursued a more experimental approach to storytelling and characterization. In the course of the story, Cyclops begins a new relationship with Emma Frost. Jean Grey dies again in New X-Men #150 (February 2004).

Also in 2001, writer Brian K. Vaughan wrote the four-issue series titled Cyclops, the character's first solo miniseries.

Beginning in July 2004, Astonishing X-Men features Cyclops, Wolverine, Beast, Emma Frost, Shadowcat, and Colossus as a team. The series was initially written by Joss Whedon, well-known for creating the Buffy the Vampire Slayer television series. During Whedon's run of Astonishing X-Men, Cyclops adopts a new attitude unfamiliar to most accustomed fans. After Emma Frost's psychic intervention at the mansion, he temporarily loses his powers after confronting his traumatic past. In an interview, Whedon explains:

No, he doesn't have his powers. Well, he had a choice to either be completely out of control or bury them. He can't use them. That's pretty much it. But the thing that would be fun is that, with no powers, he's going to be the best that he's ever been. That's what the arc is about. [Cyclops has] been the team leader and the team washout in terms of popularity. He was defined by Jean [Grey] so much, and I just think that this guy is so interesting in his struggle against mediocrity. Then, when it's all laid on the line, when you find out the thing that's been holding him back from being just a complete bad ass has been himself all his life, that he's been lying to everyone, including himself, about who he is — that should be freeing. The Scott we're going to see is going to be a little bit different. This guy is either completely out of control or in control of something we're not used to. I wanted him to be an unabashed tough guy. He is shooting people and turning very much into a leader. Not everyone is going to like it.

In the House of M storyline (2005), the Scarlet Witch magically alters reality so that almost all mutants are de-powered, with only 198 remaining. This event is referred to as "M-Day." As a consequence, the X-Men feel particularly besieged and Cyclops becomes desperate to protect the remaining mutants.

X-Men: Deadly Genesis #1 (January 2006) introduces Vulcan, the younger brother of Cyclops and Havok, who was enslaved by the Shi'ar and raised in secret by Moira MacTaggert. In April 2008, Cyclops forms a new X-Force team, a deadly clandestine strike force, appearing in its own title. Part of the X-Men: Messiah Complex crossover, X-Men #205 (January 2008) introduces Hope Summers, the first mutant born after M-Day. She is orphaned and adopted by Cable. In the Dark X-Men storyline of 2009, Scott Summers and Emma Frost enter into a complex dispute, with Frost aligned with Norman Osborn. Marvel writer Matt Fraction indicated that Emma's alliance with Osborn places Scott and Emma at odds with one another, creating "a profound schism". Throughout this time, Cyclops continued to make appearances in Uncanny X-Men.

=== 2010s and 2020s ===
Cyclops becomes overprotective of those close to him and pessimistic in his view of humanity. In X-Men: Schism (2011), written by Jason Aaron, Cyclops and Wolverine have a severe disagreement about employing teenage mutants in defense against the Hellfire Club. This splits the X-Men into two factions. Cyclops envisions his group as an "Extinction Team" who can fight global threats; his faction includes Emma Frost, Magneto, Storm, Magik, Hope Summers, Colossus, and Danger. This team featured in a new volume of Uncanny X-Men, written by Kieron Gillen with art by Carlos Pacheco, beginning in January 2012.

In Avengers vs. X-Men, the Phoenix Force returns to Earth, potentially inhabiting Hope Summers. The Avengers become concerned about the destructive potential of mutants harnessing the Phoenix, and this leads to an extensive conflict between the Avengers and the X-Men. Eventually the Phoenix Force takes over Cyclops, Emma Frost, Colossus, Magik, and Namor: The Phoenix Five. The Phoenix Five attempt to use their powers in a benevolent way, but many others, including Professor X, believe that their power is too great. The other X-Men eventually turn against the Phoenix Five, and Cyclops kills Professor X. The Phoenix Force dissipates, but new mutants begin to appear around the world. Cyclops is imprisoned. Gillen portrays Cyclops as suicidal in a five-part epilogue: AvX: Consequences.

Beast time-travels to meet the five original X-Men, explains the contemporary crisis, and brings them to the present day to restore the moral compass of the mutants. While the present-day Cyclops intended to serve his sentence, he discovers the survival of Mister Sinister and decides to assemble a new team to counter him (along with Magneto and Emma Frost). Cyclops is featured in volume 3 of The Uncanny X-Men, which was launched in February 2013, Uncanny X-Men features the remnants of Cyclops' Extinction Team, who have taken up a revolutionary, and sometimes violent course to promote mutant rights, and started up a new school for new mutants, the New Charles Xavier School for the Gifted. The younger Cyclops, time-traveled to the present from the 1960s, tries to make sense of his future and find a place for himself, while deciding if he even wants to stay an X-Man; he features in All-New X-Men. All-New X-Men was written by Brian Michael Bendis with art by Stuart Immonen, while the new Uncanny X-Men was written by Bendis and drawn by Chris Bachalo. In the Battle of the Atom crossover of 2013, the Cyclops from the past teams up with the present-day Cyclops. Cyclops's team of X-Men battle with S.H.I.E.L.D.. Cyclops is eventually able to unite the mutant population and recommit the X-Men to Professor X's goals of coexistence and tolerance. Cyclops and the other X-Men are then involved in an extensive conflict with the Inhumans, in Inhumans vs. X-Men (2016-2017).

In March 2019, Marvel announced that Jonathan Hickman would relaunch all of the X-Men titles. The relaunch began with House of X and Powers of X, with art by Pepe Larraz and R.B. Silva. The new era of X-Men was organized around a new idea: the Krakoan age, in which the world's mutants relocate to a living island and found a new nation there. Cyclops is given the rank of Captain Commander. The X-Men Senior Editor Jordan D. White said, regarding Cyclops' role:

"I think he [Cyclops] is the rock that their island nation is built upon. And I think that he is still very much a leader of his people, I think the people of Krakoa know him and what he has done for them over the years, and they look up to him. He is the head of the X-Men in any Super-Hero activity which is essentially the military of Krakoa. He might not be RULING Krakoa, but he is definitely leading it."

— Jordan D. White

== Characterization ==
=== Fictional character biography ===
Scott Summers is orphaned as a boy when a Shi'ar spacecraft attacks his family's plane over Alaska. His parents force Scott and his brother Alex into the only parachute before the plane goes down; Scott strikes his head on landing and falls into a coma, leaving him with limited control over his emerging mutant powers. After a period in state care and a brief, unsuccessful attempt to manage his abilities alone, he is taken in by Charles Xavier, who trains him and names him field leader of the X-Men.

Leading the original X-Men, Cyclops battles Magneto and the Brotherhood of Evil Mutants while developing a complicated relationship with his teammate Jean Grey. When the original team is captured by the living island Krakoa, he escapes alone and assembles a new international roster to rescue them, staying on while most of the original members leave. He later discovers that his long-missing father is Corsair, leader of a rebel alien crew called the Starjammers, though Jean learns this first and keeps it from him for years.

Jean dies piloting a spacecraft through a solar flare and is reborn as Phoenix, straining their relationship; she eventually becomes the Dark Phoenix, commits mass murder, and sacrifices herself. Cyclops subsequently meets Madelyne Pryor, a woman nearly identical to Jean, marries her, and retires from the team after their son Nathan is born. The retirement does not hold: when Jean is discovered alive, he abandons Madelyne and Nathan to rejoin the original X-Men under the name X-Factor. Madelyne, manipulated by the demons S'ym and N'astirh and eventually revealed to be a clone created by Mister Sinister, becomes the Goblin Queen and seeks revenge before killing herself. Nathan is later infected with a techno-organic virus, and Cyclops sends him into the future to survive it.

Cyclops' newer, darker uniform. Art by Chris Bachalo.

Cyclops and Jean marry and are briefly pulled into that same future, raising the infant Nathan for twelve years before returning to the present, where Nathan has grown into the mercenary Cable. Apocalypse seizes Cyclops's body during a later conflict; Jean and Cable eventually separate him from Apocalypse, but the possession leaves his relationship with Jean distant and strained. He turns to Emma Frost, and what begins as psychic therapy sessions becomes a full psychic affair. Jean discovers it, forces a confrontation, and is killed shortly after in battle with Xorn. A future version of Jean uses the Phoenix Force to reach back in time and push Cyclops past his guilt, leading him to start a real relationship with Emma and reopen the Xavier Institute with her as co-headmasters.

After M-Day depowers nearly all mutants, Cyclops becomes increasingly defensive and secretive, reviving X-Force as a covert strike team and eventually establishing a mutant sanctuary called Utopia off the coast of San Francisco. A severe ideological split with Wolverine over the use of violence divides the X-Men into two factions. When the Phoenix Force returns, it divides among five X-Men including Cyclops; possessed by its full power after the others are subdued, he kills Professor Xavier and is imprisoned. He escapes, establishes a new school for mutants at the old Weapon X facility in Canada, and works to rebuild the mutant population before Xavier's will, which names him a surrogate son, prompts him to reconsider his course. He is eventually killed and resurrected by the Phoenix Force, and later becomes one of the leaders of Krakoa, the sovereign mutant nation founded by Xavier, Magneto, and Moira X.

=== Personality ===
J. Andrew Deman draws attention to Cyclops's characterization under Claremont's tenure as an "alpha male" who nonetheless often expresses physical affection and intimacy. Cyclops experiences extreme guilt after the death of Thunderbird. In an interview, Claremont expressed the cultural overtones of his portrayal of Cyclops:

My image of [Scott Summers] was more like a very young Henry Fonda. Very Nebraska, very mid-Atlantic; middle-class is right. Middle America is better. Yet with surprising sidelines to his personality, again like Fonda.

In later decades, the character becomes increasingly desperate and aggressive.

=== Powers and abilities ===
Cyclops emits powerful beams of energy from his eyes, described as "optic blasts", which have the appearance of red light and deliver massive concussive force. The beams cause no recoil or heat, are tremendously powerful, and can be used to rupture steel plates and pulverize rock, or even punch a hole through a mountain. The beams constantly emanate from his eyes involuntarily, and can generally only be stopped by his own eyelids, or by shielding his eyes with ruby-quartz, a translucent mineral. He has also been observed using casual sunglasses and contact lenses made from the same ruby quartz as his visor lens. Cyclops wears ruby-quartz as lenses in his sunglasses or in his visor, which is generally the only way for him to safely see without inadvertently damaging his surroundings. The beams' involuntary nature has been explained as a psychological shortcoming that resulted from childhood trauma. Cyclops can nevertheless manipulate the beams in several different ways, partially through the use of adjustable apertures in his visor that allow the beams to fire through their shielding at variable levels.

Early accounts describe Cyclops' optic beams as the product of his body metabolizing sunlight and other ambient energy. The original 1983 Official Handbook of the Marvel Universe volume stated that Cyclops' eyes contain inter-dimensional apertures, releasing powerful energies from another dimension into his own via the beams. This explanation, however, was later changed for the 1986 The Official Handbook of the Marvel Universe Deluxe Edition.

Cyclops's body is naturally immune to the force of his own beams. His mind projects a psionic field that envelops his body rendering it immune to his optic beam, allowing him to shut it off by simply closing his eyes. Scott is also immune to the power of his brother Alex (Havok) who has the ability to emit waves of energy that heat the air into plasma. Likewise, Havok has demonstrated immunity to Cyclops's optic beam. Scott has been shown as being able to absorb Storm's lightning bolt, although this act caused Cyclops a great deal of pain. The ruby quartz used in his battle visor has been said to resonate with his body's psionic field.

Cyclops is an expert pilot of fixed-wing aircraft, a skill he appears to have inherited from his father. Cyclops has spent most of his superhero career as the leader of either the X-Men or X-Factor and has developed exceptional leadership skills. Cyclops also has extensive training in martial arts and unarmed combat. While not a telepath himself, Cyclops has trained himself in various psychic defenses after his relationships with Jean Grey and Emma Frost.

== Themes and motifs ==
Stories featuring Cyclops in a starring role generally focus on the pressures of leadership and associated emotional repression. While most of the X-Men represent some type of national or cultural minority, Cyclops is closest to a traditional normative identity in American culture; that is to say, white, male, heterosexual, American, and mostly able-bodied. Commentators have pointed out that Cyclops is traditionally portrayed as an archetypal hero of traditional American popular culture, in contrast to the anti-authority antiheroes that emerged in American popular culture after the Vietnam War (e.g., Wolverine, his X-Men teammate). However, the stories also often depict his ambivalent and troubled relationship with women who rival him in power and who have pronounced dark sides: Jean Grey, Madelyne Pryor, and Emma Frost. Stories in later decades depict his increasingly ruthless strategies to protect the mutant population, a tiny minority group, and to build national homelands for them (in San Francisco, Utopia, and eventually Krakoa). Stories with Cyclops as a protagonist also often include time travel, cloning, and various alternate futures.

== Supporting characters ==
=== Allies ===
Cyclops was originally created as part of an ensemble, the original X-Men, along with Professor X, Jean Grey, Iceman, Beast, and Warren Worthington III. He has an ambivalent relationship with some of his later teammates, particularly Wolverine and Storm.

=== Romantic interests ===
Cyclops has had three serious relationships: Jean Grey, Madelyne Pryor, and Emma Frost. Cyclops' relationships are particularly complicated because of the many retcons involved in the publication history of the Jean Grey and Madelyne Pryor characters.

Cyclops's longest and deepest romantic relationship is with his second wife Jean Grey, who dies and is resurrected multiple times. Previously, he married Grey's clone, Madelyne Pryor. Asked whether or not Cyclops was really in love with Madelyne, X-Factor writer Louise Simonson answered, "I think she was a substitute for Jean." Uncanny X-Men writer Chris Claremont noted that Cyclops's love for Madelyne was genuine; he intended Cyclops to settle down and retire from the team, stating, "It's a metaphor for us all. We all grow up. We all move on."

Jean Grey and Scott finally marry in X-Men #30. Afterward, Scott seemed to have reached a happy ending. Subsequently, Scott becomes possessed by Apocalypse and the lingering effects from this would taint his relationship with Jean. This combined with Jean's returning Phoenix powers creates stress in their romantic relationship. Confused, Scott turns to Emma Frost, who takes advantage of Scott's emotional problems, which leads to a telepathic extramarital affair. When confronted by Jean, Scott claims that they shared "only thoughts" and that he had done nothing wrong; Jean, however, disagrees and demands that Emma explain herself, but Emma only jeers and insults her. Enraged, Jean unleashes the immeasurable Phoenix ability on Emma, rifling her memories and forcing her to confront the truth about herself.

In the aftermath, Scott then leaves the X-Men for a time to understand his own conflicting feelings. He returns to tell Emma that he had made a decision between her and Jean, but Jean is killed in battle before it is revealed which woman he had picked. After Jean's death, Scott feels disillusioned with Xavier's dream, leaves the X-Men, and refuses Emma's offer to reopen the school. Had the school remained closed, this outcome would have led to an apocalyptic future. To avoid it, Jean, who was resurrected in this apocalyptic future, used her Phoenix abilities to absorb this future timeline into the White Hot Room. She then mentally pushed Scott past the guilt he felt over her death and made him accept Emma's offer of reopening the school with her. Emma and Scott have a complex and ambivalent relationship that includes keeping secrets from one another.

=== Family ===
Cyclops has an extensive immediate family, including various clones and kin from alternate timelines. These include his father, Corsair; and his brothers, Havok and Vulcan; He has a son, Cable, who has an evil clone, Stryfe; there is also a younger version of Cable from another timeline, Nate Grey. He has a daughter from an alternate future, Rachel Summers, and an adopted granddaughter, Hope Summers.

=== Alternate versions ===
There are various alternate versions of Cyclops in the Marvel Universe. In 1995, a variant appeared in the timeline of Age of Apocalypse, and a subsequent variant was portrayed in 2001 in the Ultimate Marvel imprint.

In 2012, a young version of Cyclops from the original incarnation of the X-Men from decades ago was brought into the contemporary continuity. This version of Cyclops features in the title All New X-Men; he sometimes works together with his older counterpart. The young time-displaced Cyclops also featured in his own miniseries. The character is also a member of the new Champions team. This version of Cyclops was in a relationship with X-23.

== Reception ==
Cyclops has placed well in rankings of X-Men characters specifically, with IGN naming him first in their "Top 25 X-Men" list in 2006 and Entertainment Weekly ranking him in the second in their X-Men retrospective in 2014. His standing in broader character polls is more mixed: IGN placed him 39th among comic book heroes in 2011, ComicBook.com ranked him 25th on their list of the fifty most important superheroes in 2019, and The A.V. Club placed him 72nd in their 2022 ranking of the hundred best Marvel characters overall. Readers of Comic Book Resources voted him 9th in their 2011 poll of top Marvel characters, while Newsarama ranked him 3rd among X-Men members in 2022. Wizard Magazine's 2008 ranking of the two hundred greatest comic book characters placed him 106th, and Comic Book Resources included him in their list of the ten bravest mutants in Marvel Comics in 2021.

== In other media ==
Cyclops is one of the X-Men characters who appears in most of the media adaptations of the X-Men franchise, including the 20th Century Fox X-Men films, television, computer and video games. He was first portrayed by James Marsden in X-Men (2000), who reprised the role in X2 (2003), X-Men: The Last Stand (2006), X-Men: Days of Future Past (2014), and the Marvel Cinematic Universe (MCU) film Avengers: Doomsday (2026). Younger versions of the character were played by Tim Pocock in X-Men Origins: Wolverine (2009) and Tye Sheridan in X-Men: Apocalypse (2016), Deadpool 2 (2018), and Dark Phoenix (2019). Kit Connor is set to portray a new version of the character native to the MCU, beginning with the untitled X-Men film (2028).

In animation, he appears in X-Men: The Animated Series (1992–1997) voiced by Norm Spencer as well as its revival X-Men '97 (2024-present) voiced by Ray Chase, in X-Men: Evolution (2000–2003) voiced by Kirby Morrow, in Wolverine and the X-Men (2009) voiced by Nolan North, and in the Marvel Anime series Wolverine and X-Men (both 2011), voiced in Japanese by Toshiyuki Morikawa and in English by Scott Porter.
