= Deathbird =

Marvel Comics fictional character

Cal'syee Neramani Deathbird
- Cal'syee Neramani / Deathbird as depicted in New Mutants vol. 4 #5 (January 2020). Art by Rod Reis.

Publication information
- Publisher: Marvel Comics
- First appearance: Ms. Marvel #9 (September 1977)
- Created by: Chris Claremont (writer); Dave Cockrum (artist); Keith Pollard (penciler)

In-story information
- Alter ego: Cal'syee Neramani
- Species: Shi'ar mutant
- Team affiliations: Horsemen of Apocalypse; Shi'ar Imperium; The Brood; Starforce
- Notable aliases: Deathbird; War
- Abilities: Superhuman strength, stamina, and sturdiness; Razor-sharp talons; Flight via wings; Expert hand-to-hand combatant

Deathbird (Cal'syee Neramani) is a character appearing in American comic books published by Marvel Comics. Created by Chris Claremont, Dave Cockrum and Keith Pollard, the character first appeared in Ms. Marvel #9 (September 1977). Cal'syee Neramani is part of a segment of the extraterrestrial Shi'ar race with a mutation that gives her more pronounced bird-like traits than most Shi'ar.

Deathbird was born into the noble family of the Shi'ar empire. She is the banished sister of the Shi'ar empress Lilandra Neramani. Deathbird seeks to overthrow her sister to gain access to the throne. She is a recurring antagonist of the superhero Carol Danvers / Captain Marvel as well as the X-Men.

== Publication history ==
Deathbird debuted in Ms. Marvel #9 (September 1977), created by writer Chris Claremont and penciler Keith Pollard. She later appeared in the 1981 Uncanny X-Men series. She appeared in the 2020 New Mutants series. She appeared in the 2022 Secret X-Men one-shot.

== Fictional character biography ==
Deathbird's first appearance, in Ms. Marvel (vol. 1) #9 (1977).

Deathbird was born Cal'syee Neramani to the ruling house of the Shi'ar Imperium on the Aerie (now known as Chandilar), native world of the Shi'ar. Her name was stripped from her after it was prophesied that she was destined to commit great evil. She was exiled after murdering her mother and an unnamed sister.

During this exile, Deathbird travels to Earth and becomes an associate of MODOK and Advanced Idea Mechanics. Following AIM's orders, she battles Carol Danvers in New York. The skirmish is interrupted after Deathbird severely injures Carol, who had been distracted trying to save the lives of two small children. Carol, going undercover, discovers that AIM had a secret headquarters underneath Alden's Department Store. Carol battles Deathbird again, which ends with Deathbird seemingly being killed and MODOK betraying her.

Some time later, Deathbird's younger sister Lilandra Neramani becomes Majestrix of the Shi'ar following the events that left her brother, D'Ken, comatose. Deathbird decides to take the throne for herself and allies with the councilman Samedar, the alien Brood, and renegade members of the Imperial Guard in an attempted coup. The X-Men defeat Deathbird and her allies, but are infected by the Brood. They are ultimately cured thanks to the efforts of Ms. Marvel and the Acanti Soulsinger. Deathbird later succeeds in deposing Lilandra with the aid of the Brood and takes the throne for herself.

Some time later, War Skrulls impersonating Professor X and the Starjammers aid Lilandra in deposing Deathbird and restoring her to the throne. Deathbird allows Lilandra to take the throne, having grown bored of the bureaucracy. Deathbird is granted dominion over the conquered Kree empire as viceroy, and also made praetor (leader) of the Kree Starforce.

=== Romance with Bishop ===
When the Shi'ar ask for the X-Men's help against the invading Phalanx, who had already reached their throne-world Chandilar, the X-Men ally with Deathbird. They manage to fend off a Phalanx assault on the Shi'ar, and during the conflict, Deathbird and the X-Man Bishop forge a warrior's respect for each other. Deathbird is amazed that Bishop shows no fear and stands up to her, and they also seem attracted to each other. Eventually, the two become romantically involved.

Bishop and Deathbird are accidentally transported to an alternate future Earth ruled by Alanna, the daughter of Lilandra and Charles Xavier. Bishop and Deathbird help the rebels in opposing Alanna, ultimately defeating her in a duel. Deathbird has the chance to kill Alanna, but allows her to live. The heroes of the liberated Earth help Bishop and Deathbird return to their own time.

=== Betrayal and theorized heritage ===
Cover of Bishop: The Last X-Man #15 (2000). Art by Georges Jeanty and Art Thibert.

Eventually, Bishop and Deathbird return to the Solar System and encounter the inert planetary mass of the Living Monolith on their way to Terra Firma. Curious, the two land their craft and investigate. Suddenly, Deathbird betrays Bishop to a cadre of Skrulls and he is returned to Earth to implement the plans of Apocalypse. Deathbird is herself betrayed and transformed by Apocalypse into one of the Horsemen of Apocalypse. After Apocalypse is defeated, Deathbird and the Horsemen scatter.

Sometime later, a globetrotting X-Men team led by Storm exile themselves from their home and teammates to find Destiny's thirteen diaries since none like the idea of having their destinies defined. This team recruits new members Heather Cameron and her brother Davis. During a mission to infiltrate the ship of the intergalactic warlord Khan, Heather's appearance changes to resemble the Shi'ar, and it is theorized that she and Davis have Shi'ar heritage. Jean Grey notes that Heather's cranial markings and feathered crest indicate that she is descended from the royal Shi'ar. It is implied that Deathbird may be Heather's mother.

=== The Rise and Fall of the Shi'ar Empire ===
During his quest for vengeance against the Shi'ar, Vulcan is captured and held in the same prison as Deathbird. Vulcan is released by a member of a secret order that wishes D'Ken to lead the Shi'ar once more; Vulcan releases Deathbird.

Vulcan is enthralled by Deathbird, and they become romantically involved. He promises to put his quest for vengeance on hold. Deathbird convinces Vulcan to finish the healing process that the Shi'ar members of the secret order had begun on D'Ken, who remained in a coma since the M'Kraan Crystal incident. When D'Ken discerns Vulcan's feelings for Deathbird, he invokes an ancient Shi'ar custom and invites Vulcan to marry Deathbird.

During Vulcan and Deathbird's wedding, the X-Men, Lilandra, the Starjammers, and the Shi'ar loyal to Lilandra attack. During the chaos that ensues, Vulcan kills D'Ken and becomes the emperor of the Shi'ar, with Deathbird as his empress.

== Powers and abilities ==
Deathbird is a genetic mutant who belongs to the Shi'ar species. She possesses superhuman strength, speed, stamina, agility, flexibility, reflexes, coordination, balance, and endurance well beyond the average limits of her race. She shares the same avian-like physiology typical of her race, such as having hollow bones, but in her case the avian characteristics are more pronounced. This is because she is a "genetic throwback" resembling the ancient Shi'ar, who were more bird-like. She has inherited atavistic characteristics such as fully functioning wings, which most Shi'ar lack, and is capable of self-propelled flight at a natural winged flight limit velocity. Her wings are also very strong, as she could flex her wing to throw Ms. Marvel off the building or to the wall. Her fingernails are essentially talons which can score steel and tear through substances such as bone and tissue easily.

Aside from her natural physical advantages, Deathbird is a formidably trained warrior of great skill and cunning, having trained the likes of Gladiator. She is also skilled at hurling javelins. She uses a variety of javelins, some of which are designed for specific offensive effects. She carries the javelins as eight-inch (203 mm) quills on twin wrist-bands; when removed from its sheath, a quill will telescope to about four times its original length. Her standard javelin can be used as a spear-like projectile to wound or kill her foes. She has also used a javelin that emits noxious, acrid fumes upon impact. Some of Deathbird's javelins are so designed that when their tips touch they emit a powerful, repeating 35,000 volt electrical charge. Deathbird has also used other equipment of Shi'ar design, including battle armor, and a large, advanced, one-woman energy cannon.

== Reception ==
C. M. Edwards of Game Rant named Deathbird one of Marvel's "most iconic female villains," describing her as a "prominent threat to both the X-Men and Captain Marvel." Liz Wyatt of Comic Book Resources referred to Deathbird as an "iconic villain" of Captain Marvel. Darby Hart of Screen Rant called Deathbird one of the "best female villains" of the X-Men and a "major cosmic antagonist" of the superhero team."

== Other versions ==
=== Age of Apocalypse ===
An alternate version of Deathbird appears in the Age of Apocalypse storyline. She is the leader of the Starjammers.

=== Star Trek/X-Men ===
An alternate version of Deathbird appears in Star Trek/X-Men. Deathbird defies the will of her sister and leads a Shi'ar force into the Star Trek reality. She attempts to partner with the reality-controlling Gary Mitchell.

=== X-Men: The End ===
An alternate version of Deathbird appears in X-Men: The End. She and Lucas Bishop have a daughter named Aliyah. Deathbird is killed by her daughter after having been infected with a Brood Queen egg.

== In other media ==
=== Television ===
- Cal'syee Neramani / Deathbird appears in X-Men: The Animated Series.
- Cal'syee Neramani / Deathbird appears in the X-Men '97 episode "Lifedeath - Part 2", voiced by Cari Kabinoff.

=== Video games ===
- Cal'syee Neramani / Deathbird appears in X-Men.
- Cal'syee Neramani / Deathbird appears as a boss in X-Men 2: Clone Wars.
- Cal'syee Neramani / Deathbird appears as a boss in Marvel: Ultimate Alliance, voiced by Nika Futterman.

=== Merchandise ===
In 2013, Eaglemoss Publications released a Cal'syee Neramani / Deathbird action figure as part of the Classic Marvel Figurine Collection action figure line.
