= X-Men: The End =

2004-2006 trilogy of miniseries

- Cover to X-Men: The End - Dreamers and Demons #3, by Greg Land.

Publication information
- Publisher: Marvel Comics
- Format: Limited series
- Publication date: 2004–2006
- No. of issues: 18
- Main character: X-Men

Creative team
- Written by: Chris Claremont
- Artist(s): Sean Chen; Greg Land; Gene Ha

X-Men: The End is a 2004-2006 trilogy of miniseries published by Marvel Comics, detailing the last days of the X-Men and their adventures in an alternative future. The series, which was part of Marvel's The End line of books, was written by Chris Claremont and drawn by Sean Chen, with cover art by Greg Land and Gene Ha.

The first part of the miniseries is titled Dreamers and Demons, the second Heroes and Martyrs, and the third Men and X-Men.

The story of X-Men: The End continues in the 2008 GeNext mini-series, then again in the 2009 mini-series, GeNext: United.

== Book 1: Dreamers and Demons ==
Aliyah Bishop, an heir to the Shi'ar throne and the daughter of Lucas Bishop and Deathbird, witnesses a Kree dreadnought entering orbit around a planet. Deciding to investigate, Aliyah discovers that a coalition of Slavers have brokered a deal with the Kree for the Phoenix Egg, which the Kree hope to use against the Shi'ar. Realizing the danger to her people, Aliyah knows that she must warn the Shi'ar, but she is attacked by the Slavers' brainwashed mutant bodyguards, the Hounds. The Kree on the planet attempt to flee, when it is revealed that one of their troops is a Skrull agent who proceeds to destroy the Kree landing-transport. As the Slavers retreat, Brood eggs begin to land and hatch on the planet, killing any remaining Kree troops and going after Aliyah. Meanwhile, the Phoenix Egg hatches, revealing Jean Grey, the previous bearer of the Phoenix Force. Jean Grey helps Aliyah escape onto her ship, saving Nocturne. Both the Shi'ar and the Brood are apparently after a new stargate network.

Aliyah engages her ship, the Starjammer, to warp speed inside the planet's atmosphere, which destroys the planet, as well as its star and all ships in orbit. Jean Grey saves the Starjammer by manifesting the Phoenix Force. This discharge is noted by Mister Sinister, who notes that all the pieces are finally back on the board to allow him to restart his plans for world domination.

Sinister sends his minions to kill most of X-Force's members. At the same time, Shi'ar empress Lilandra Neramani orders the Phoenix to be destroyed. Her Lord Chancellor sends Warskrull forces to attack the X-Men, including Emma Frost and Rogue in California, and Iceman and Sage at X-Corp headquarters. Frost and Rogue survive, only to realize that Rogue's home has been attacked and both her children and those of Cyclops have been captured.

Madelyne Pryor and a pair of Warskrulls impersonating Stryfe and Genesis attack the X-Mansion, killing many of the students and staff. The mansion is destroyed in an explosion that destroys much of the surrounding area.

== Book 2: Heroes and Martyrs ==
Kitty Pryde returns to Chicago to continue her campaign for mayor. The X-Men and their allies quickly regroup, but are attacked by Warskrulls. During the strategic attack on all of the various groups across the globe, the Skrulls are barely repelled while the X-Men experience heavy losses. Meanwhile, Aliyah encounters Deathbird, who Lilandra allowed to be the host of a Brood queen. Aliyah is forced to kill her mother and is unknowingly infected by the Brood queen.

Cyclops sends Wolverine, X-23, M, and Marvel Girl to find Sinister, Gambit, and the abducted children. The heroes manage to find their way to Sinister's hidden base, but are attacked and immobilized by Lady Mastermind. All live out their fantasies until Jean Grey inspires Wolverine to break free. He escapes the mind control and helps the others break free. They all charge deeper into Sinister's base.

Gambit has been faking cooperation with Sinister, only doing so in order to protect the children. After Sinister reveals his own history and the fact that Gambit is actually a clone from his and Cyclops's genetic makeup, Gambit decides to rescue the children. As they make their escape, most of the children are teleported back to Earth, while Gambit and his daughter are teleported to the moon, near Sinister's mutant prison Neverland. Rogue rescues her son and Emma Frost's children.

Back at Sinister's base, Rogue kills one of Sinister's minions, only to be killed by Sinister. Mystique arrives, revealing that she had been pretending to be Sinister's servant Dark Beast, and kills Sinister to avenge Rogue. Gambit urges Mystique to finally meet her grandchildren and keep them safe. Gambit takes Sinister's place for a meeting with the true mastermind behind the attacks on the X-Men, the Shi'ar.

== Book 3: Men and X-Men ==
It is revealed that Khan is Lord Chancellor of the Shi'ar empire, with Lilandra having become a figurehead after being driven insane by Cassandra Nova. Gambit instantly recognizes Khan - they battle and end up killing each other. Nova reveals her involvement to everyone involved, starting with Xavier. On the Starjammer, the Brood eggs have multiplied thanks to Aliyah and land on the Shi'ar's home planet. The Brood, having made a deal with Nova, begin attacking X-Men.

Nova attacks the X-Men and the Shi'ar Imperial Guard. She then begins to erase Xavier's mind. Marvel Girl summons her residual Phoenix Force energies and engages Nova in psychic battle. Meanwhile, Cable uses his telekinesis to fight Nova on the physical level, but succumbs to his techno-organic virus.

Jean Grey heals Cable, but she and Cyclops are suddenly killed by Nova, who is controlling Marvel Girl. Nova takes control of the Phoenix Force and kills the Imperial Guard, Dazzler, and Storm. Madelyne Pryor turns into energy and fuses with Jean, resurrecting her and allowing her to resurrect Cyclops.

Psylocke enters the fray and attacks Nova, immobilizing her. Jean Grey tells Nova that they are all going to transcend reality. Jean resurrects all of the defeated/dead X-Men, bringing some with her to become one with the universe while bringing others back to Earth. She and the resurrected X-Men form a giant Phoenix and become part of the universe itself.

The remaining X-Men who did not merge with the Phoenix are seen 20 years later, when Kitty Pryde becomes President of the United States. Pryde formally disbands the X-Men, saying that they were their own worst enemy, and that it was time for something new. She emphasizes this is not an end, but a beginning.

== Criticism ==
W. Blaine Dowler of Bureau 42 gave X-Men: The End Book 1: Dreamers and Demons a 21 out of a possible 42. Dowler praised the scenes featuring Storm as the most compelling, despite not having been a particularly avid fan of that character, and the artwork, saying that the pencils, coloring and storytelling were "all on target", but criticized other aspects of the book, including the characterization, the pacing of the action scenes, and the story, which he felt was neither original nor complete, lacked character insight, and did not serve as a worthy finale to the X-Men.

== GeNext ==
According to one interview with Chris Claremont, GeNext is supposed to take place 10 years after the events of X-Men: The End, although as the series progresses, several characters who have died in X-Men: The End are revealed to still be alive, such as Cyclops and Gambit. GeNext was planned as a five-issue miniseries, with a sequel mini-series published in 2009.

The storyline was originally conceived with the idea of the X-Men aging in real-time. In an early 2006 interview with IGN, Claremont summarized the concept as:

The series takes place in 2006 and follows continuity up through X-Men Vol. 2 #3. While the public believes Magneto is dead, he decided, in actuality, to disappear from the public eye in order to live in peace. "The '90s never happened", Claremont said, referring to the continuity break and perhaps the dark period full of bad X-Men stories.

Some 1990s characters appeared, such as Stryfe and Cecilia Reyes, both of whom appeared in X-Men: The End. In the February 2006 IGN interview, Claremont also mentioned that Xavier and Magneto were both alive, contrary to the X-Men: The End storyline, though he stated in a May 2008 Newsarama interview that "Charlie has moved on and so has Magneto. They've died over the last twenty years".

Cyclops and Gambit, who both died at the end of the X-Men: The End storyline, are shown to be alive in this future, with Cyclops still running the school with Emma Frost, though both fell out of touch with the X-Men after Rogue's death, as Gambit barely speaks to his son Olivier, doing so only through Olivier's sister.

=== Characters ===
- Becca Munroe: Daughter of Storm. Father unknown.
- Rico Richards (led to believe to be the grandson of Reed Richards and Susan Storm): Alleged son of Franklin Richards.
- Olivier Raven: The oldest son of Rogue and Gambit. He took his mother's maiden name presumably after her death and his estrangement from his father.
- Rebecca LeBeau: Daughter of Rogue and Gambit.
- Pavel Rasputin: Grandson of Colossus and son of Polaris.
- Beast
- Cecilia Reyes
- X-23
- Emma Frost
- Cyclops
- Megan Summers: Daughter of Cyclops and Emma Frost.
