= Slipstream (character) =

Publication information
- Publisher: Marvel Comics
- First appearance: (As Davis Cameron); X-Treme X-Men #6 (October 2001) (As Slipstream); X-Treme X-Men #10 (April 2002)
- Created by: Chris Claremont; Salvador Larroca

In-story information
- Alter ego: Davis Cameron
- Species: Human Mutant/Shi'ar hybrid
- Team affiliations: X-Men
- Abilities: Limited space-time manipulation and reality warping capabilities that enables him to conjure a "Warp Wave"; Psychic navigation Use of a shortened metal surfboard Ability to take other people through the Warp Wave through increased concentration to maintain the wave

Slipstream (Davis Cameron) is a fictional character appearing in American comic books published by Marvel Comics. The character is depicted as a superhero associated with the X-Men. Created by writer Chris Claremont and artist Salvador Larroca, he first appeared in X-Treme X-Men #6 (December 2001).

He is a mutant, able to generate a "warp wave" for the purpose of teleportation. He and his sister Lifeguard were briefly members of the squad of X-Men featured in the series X-Treme X-Men.

== Fictional character biography ==
Davis Cameron and his sister Heather are from Surfers Paradise in Australia, where they respectively work as a surfer and lifeguard. They do not know that their father is the underworld crime lord Viceroy. Upon their father's death, the two are attacked. Davis is informed by Sage that although he was never meant to be a mutant and that his latent mutant gene was supposed to be passed down to his children, his mutant power may be helpful to her. He agrees to let Sage activate his powers, gaining a teleportational ability in the form of the "warp wave". Together with Storm and Thunderbird, Davis and Heather fend off their attackers. Following these events, both siblings join Storm's team of X-Men. Davis has a brief romance with Storm.

While infiltrating the ship of the intergalactic warlord Khan, Heather develops a more avian look, leading to speculation that the two are related to the Shi'ar (an alien species with avian traits). Davis is unable to see past his sister's new appearance and leaves the X-Men.

Slipstream is among the mutants who lost their powers as a result of M-Day. He later regains his powers under unspecified circumstances and becomes a citizen of Krakoa.

== Powers and abilities ==
Slipstream can teleport via a funnel of trans-spatial energy also called a "warp wave". He can take other people through the warp wave, but requires increased concentration to maintain the wave when doing so. Slipstream is sensitive to the energy generated by other sources of teleportation, allowing him to track their source. Additionally, Slipstream uses his surfboard to traverse his portals and increase the accuracy of his teleportation.

== Other versions ==
- An alternate timeline version of Slipstream appears in X-Men: The End. This version is a member of Mister Sinister's Hounds and is able to teleport across intergalactic distances.
- An alternate timeline version of Slipstream appears in Age of Apocalypse (vol. 2) as a member of the Elite Mutant Force.

== Reception ==
- In 2014, Entertainment Weekly ranked Slipstream 85th in their "Let's rank every X-Man ever" list.
- In 2017, Comic Book Resources listed Slipstream as one of the superheroes Marvel wants you to forget.
