= Lady Mastermind =

Fictional character

- Lady Mastermind from X-Men #197. Art by Chris Bachalo.

Publication information
- Publisher: Marvel Comics
- First appearance: X-Treme X-Men #6 (December 2001)
- Created by: Chris Claremont; Salvador Larroca

In-story information
- Alter ego: Regan Wyngarde
- Species: Human mutant
- Team affiliations: Brotherhood of Mutants; Hellfire Club; Marauders; Sisterhood of Mutants; X-Men
- Notable aliases: Mastermind
- Abilities: Induction of fear and hallucinations via telepathy: Psychosomatic symptoms; Telepathic invisibility

Lady Mastermind is a supervillain appearing in American comic books published by Marvel Comics. Created by writer Chris Claremont and artist Salvador Larroca, the character first appeared as Regan Wyngarde in X-Treme X-Men #6 (December 2001).

Regan Wyngarde is the daughter of Jason Wyngarde, the original Mastermind. Her half-sisters are Martinique Jason, the second Mastermind, who now shares her codename, and the X-Men's Pixie. Like her sister and father, Regan possesses the ability to cast telepathic illusions. Although the character originally appeared as a villain, she would later have a brief stint as an X-Man, betraying the X-Men a short time after joining them.

== Fictional character biography ==
=== X-Treme X-Men ===
Regan Wyngarde is one of three daughters of Jason Wyngarde, the original Mastermind. She has an intense hatred for her half-sister, Martinique (though she was the first to use their now-shared codename). She is hated by her sister for "stealing the spotlight", while she hates her sister for being a "skank", with the two of them constantly insulting each other.

Regan is involved in a plot created by Sebastian Shaw to have his revenge against Sage and gain control of the Sydney underworld. In an attempt to make Sage work for Shaw again, Regan places her in a series of illusions. However, with the assistance of Lifeguard, Sage breaks the illusion and reflect Regan's powers back against her, leaving her in a vegetative state.

=== Joining The X-Men ===
Regan is one of the few mutants who retain their powers after M-Day. She is rendered comatose by scientists of the Fordyce Clinic, who intended to determine if a person could catch mutation like a disease. Regan finally awakens from her coma after her powers are temporarily hijacked by Serafina and goes on to join Rogue's strike force/field team. The team goes to Cable's island utopia of Providence to find a cure for Rogue after she is infected with Strain 88. While there the island is attacked by an ancient Shi'ar superweapon known as the Hecatomb, forcing Regan and the rest of the team to fight the psionic horror. The weapon is eventually defeated thanks to Rogue's power-absorption abilities, supercharged by Strain 88.

=== Marauders ===
When Rogue's team of X-Men goes to one of Mystique's safe-houses, an intruder alarm later goes off. Initially confused by the seemingly invisible nature of their opponents, the X-Men are caught off guard when Regan drops her illusionary cloak to reveal the Marauders. Regan later fights alongside the other Marauders in Flint, Michigan, against Iceman and Cannonball, as both sides try to obtain the diaries of Destiny.

=== Sisterhood of Mutants ===
The Sisterhood approaches Regan, who is at a graveyard mourning her father. At first, Regan points her gun to Madelyne Pryor's head. When Madelyne promises to resurrect Regan's father, Regan joins - this, however, disgusts Martinique. Later in San Francisco, the Sisterhood perform a spell involving Kwannon's body and a captive Psylocke, restoring her to her original body. Later, when the Sisterhood attack the X-Men, Regan takes out Emma Frost by trapping her in an illusion and then leaving her bound and gagged in a dark room, cutting her off from her senses. While trapped, Frost unexpectedly finds what seems to be Jean Grey communicating to her, and seemingly aiding Frost. Frost becomes the first person not to fall for Regan's illusion, prompting Regan to worry. Frost savagely beats Regan, calling her a traitor to her kind.

=== All-New X-Men ===
Sometime later, Regan ends up incarcerated in the Raft. Together with Sabretooth, Mystique breaks Regan out of jail and offers her a chance to get rich. Regan encounters a young, time-displaced version of Jean Grey and attempts to awaken the Phoenix Force from within her, but is unsuccessful.

Regan intends to hone her powers and pushes herself to create even more realistic illusions. She chooses to manipulate Anole, one of the X-Men's students, who is insecure about his appearance and chose not to go on a date as a result. Regan latches onto Anole's insecurity and traps him in an illusion based on his fears of rejection. When Regan traps the other X-Men in illusions, Nightcrawler manages to escape and helps Anole do the same.

=== All-New, Different Marvel ===
Regan is revealed to be one of the many mutants inflicted by Terrigen Mist, a substance that is toxic to mutants. Suffering from the M-Pox and fearing that she will die alone, she traps as many people as she can in illusions, intending to take them with her. Regan is found by Danielle Moonstar, who tries to reason with her to release the people she put under and let the X-Men help her. Moonstar tells her that she understand her fear and pain more than she knows, but Regan finds it hard to believe, saying to her that she has no idea what it's like to live with fear. To show how much she understood, Moonstar shows Regan her memories and all the pain she went through, cancelling her illusion in the process. Moonstar transports Regan to X-Haven, where her condition is stabilized.

=== Rejoining the X-Men ===
During the Krakoan Age, Lady Mastermind is among the enemies of the X-Men who are given a second chance on Krakoa. However she apparently left Krakoa for her own reasons and went to the now abandoned X-Mansion in order to use one of its teleport gates to rejoin the X-Men on Krakoa. There, she is attacked and captured by a horde of Sidri hatchlings after accidentally disturbing their nest. She instinctively uses her powers to exert some control over them, causing Krakoa to alert the X-Men to investigate. Cypher manages to contact and form a deal with the Sidri, allowing Regan and the X-Men to leave.

== Characteristics ==
=== Powers and abilities ===
Regan demonstrating her powers, art by Humberto Ramos

Lady Mastermind possesses the mutant power to project extremely convincing and realistic illusions into the minds of others, the same ability her father had.

Her illusions are telepathic and her victims tend to accept them as fact, even when the images and scenarios they are confronted with involve sudden changes to the world around them, or are inconsistent or improbable (for example, Rogue, when under Lady Mastermind's control, did not question the sudden existence of a multitude of Vargases, or the random jumps in location and time she was experiencing). As such, they can be used as a very effective brainwashing tool.

Regan's powers have psychosomatic effects, meaning they can also kill, as her victims' bodies respond as if her illusions are real. She confronted Viceroy with the illusion that he was drowning, and, believing it to be real, he suffocated, despite having no physical injuries and being in a room with sufficient oxygen. Heather Cameron's body also responded in a similar way, bleeding through the pores in her back when she was under the illusion she had been stabbed.

Also, her illusions can put enemies in a coma-like state, by telepathically trapping her enemies' minds in a maze from which there's no escape. This technique, when combined with a psychic chaff that Regan is also capable of emitting, is an effective tool against even the most powerful of telepaths: as Regan was able to imprison a sleeping Emma Frost's mind using such a method. The White Queen found that her cognition was too interrupted to even understand what was happening, much less summon her own psionic abilities to fight back. Emma was freed, however, by the appearance of Jean Grey, who broke the psi-chaff, utilizing her emblematic Phoenix raptor.

In addition, unlike her father, both Regan and her half-sister Martinique have limited telepathic abilities that enable them to read their opponent's mind and make their illusions all the more accurate for it. Regan's illusions have also been shown to persist even after she has been rendered unconscious.

=== Personality ===
Lady Mastermind has a distinct personality, to a point where writer Mike Carey refers to her as an "exuberant, sexy sociopath". Regan's brief tenure as an X-Man has granted her the X-Men uniform, something she still wears proudly even after attacking several of the X-Men. Interviewer Trevor Cates asked Carey why he added Lady Mastermind to the X-Men; Carey's response was:

"So I chose Lady Mastermind partly because she's such a volatile and extreme personality. As with Mystique, you suspect that some aspects of her behavior may have their roots in an actual psychosis. But on the surface you've just got this amazing, wickedly ingenious, endlessly aggressive woman who never lets anyone get away with anything. She's the hardest X-Man for Rogue to wrangle, even taking Mystique into account. Because of course Mystique is trying hard – for whatever reasons – to be supportive of Rogue's position, while Regan doesn't give a damn."

== Reception ==
=== Accolades ===
- In 2014, Entertainment Weekly ranked Lady Mastermind 74th in their "Let's rank every X-Man ever" list.
- In 2019, CBR.com ranked Lady Mastermind 8th in their "X-Men: The 10 Most Powerful Female Villains" list and 8th in their "10 Daughters Of Marvel Supervillains That Are More Dangerous Than Their Parents" list.
- In 2020, CBR.com ranked Lady Mastermind 10th in their "X-Men: 10 Most Powerful Members of the Sisterhood of Mutants" list.
- In 2020, Scary Mommy included Lady Mastermind in their "Looking For A Role Model? These 195+ Marvel Female Characters Are Truly Heroic" list.
- In 2022, CBR.com ranked Lady Mastermind 10th in their "10 Best Marvel Legacy Villains" list.
