= Lifeguard (character) =

- Lifeguard as depicted in X-Treme X-Men #18 (November 2002). Art by Salvador Larroca.

Publication information
- Publisher: Marvel Comics
- First appearance: (As Heather Cameron); X-Treme X-Men #6 (December 2001) (As Lifeguard); X-Treme X-Men #7 (January 2002)
- Created by: Chris Claremont and Salvador Larroca

In-story information
- Alter ego: Heather Cameron
- Species: Human mutant/Shi'ar hybrid
- Team affiliations: X-Men; X-Corporation
- Notable aliases: Lifeguard
- Abilities: Shi'ar genome's abilities granting gold skin, claws, and the power to grow wings; Situational biomorphic adaptation; Danger detector response; Trained swimmer; Trained lifeguard

Lifeguard (Heather Cameron) is a character, a superhero appearing in American comic books published by Marvel Comics. Created by writer Chris Claremont and artist Salvador Larroca, the character first appeared in X-Treme X-Men #6 (December 2001). She is primarily associated with the X-Men.

Lifeguard is a mutant, gaining whatever superhuman abilities are needed in a life-threatening situation. She and her brother Slipstream were briefly members of the segment of X-Men featured in the series X-Treme X-Men.

== Fictional character biography ==
=== X-Treme X-Men ===
Heather and Davis Cameron are a lifeguard and a surfer, respectively, living in Surfers Paradise in Australia. Unbeknownst to them, their father is an underworld crime lord known as Viceroy, and upon his death they are attacked. Together with Storm and Neal Shaara (the new Thunderbird), they manage to defeat their attackers. Heather discovers she is a mutant with the power to manifest whatever is necessary to save the life of someone in danger around her, including her own. Her power enables her to manifest wings, golden armor, the ability to breathe underwater, and many other less noticeable adaptations. Heather soon joins the splinter team of X-Men and forms a romance with Thunderbird.

During a mission to infiltrate the ship of the intergalactic warlord Khan, Heather's appearance changes to resemble the alien Shi'ar race. Jean Grey theorizes that Heather is descended from the royal Shi'ar based on the appearance of her feather crest and facial markings.

=== The Xavier Institute ===
Lifeguard and Thunderbird return to the X-Men, having been unsuccessful in locating Slipstream after he left the X-Men. Together with Thunderbird, she joins the X-Corporation. Several weeks later, the X-Corporation is targeted in a synchronized attack after the catastrophic events of M-Day, leading Cyclops to call for the disbanding of all offices. Lifeguard is one of a handful of mutants to have retained her powers in the wake of House of M, when most mutants lost their powers.

=== Krakoa ===
After Krakoa leaves Earth to reside in the White Hot Room, Heather returns to civilian life. However, she loses control of her emotions and powers after dealing with anti-mutant discrimination. Her friend Ugly John convinces Heather to embrace her powers. In response, she leaves for the ocean and transforms into a small living island.

== Powers and abilities ==
Heather's mutant power allows her body to sense and react to any threat by transforming or manifesting a power to deal with the situation (similar to that of the X-Men's Darwin). She has a moderate level of control over this power and has sometimes been able to trigger it at will, although she has not displayed any control over the transformations or powers she manifests. Heather has mostly manifested physical changes such as extra arms, armored skin, wings, and a mermaid tail.

In addition to her superhuman powers, Heather is a trained lifeguard and skilled swimmer.

== Reception ==
=== Critical reception ===
Lukas Shayo of Screen Rant stated, "A mutant with the power to save lives, the aptly named Lifeguard can develop any ability necessary to save any life, be it her own or another's. If that means turning into metal, growing wings, or shapeshifting, Lifeguard will develop that power and subsequently save a life. As what essentially amounts to a stronger version of Darwin, Lifeguard doesn't really get the reputation she deserves. No mutant can ever surpass her ability to save lives, as their mutations are often tailored to other specific niches. With no upper limit to determine how she can shift, Lifeguard deserves her place among the Omega-levels."

=== Accolades ===
- In 2015, Entertainment Weekly ranked Lifeguard 84th in their "Let's rank every X-Man ever" list.
- In 2016 Screen Rant ranked Lifeguard 7th in their "X-Men: 16 Mutants Who Just Disappeared From The Comics" list.
- In 2017, Comic Book Resources (CBR) ranked Lifeguard 8th in their "15 Superheroes Marvel Wants You To Forget" list.
- In 2018, CBR ranked Lifeguard 1st in their "20 Weirdest Mutants To Ever Be X-Men" list.
- In 2020, Scary Mommy included Lifeguard in their "Looking For A Role Model? These 195+ Marvel Female Characters Are Truly Heroic" list.
- In 2020, CBR ranked Lifeguard 3rd in their "X-Treme X-Men's 10 Most Powerful Members" list.
- In 2021, Screen Rant included Lifeguard in their "Marvel's Most Powerful X-Men Members That Time Forgot" list.
- In 2022, Screen Rant included Lifeguard in their "X-Men: Synch & 9 Other Mutants Who Could Become Omega Level" list.
