= X-Treme X-Men =

Marvel Comics X-Men spin-off series

- Cover of X-Treme X-Men #1 (July 2001). Art by Salvador Larroca

Publication information
- Publisher: Marvel Comics
- Schedule: Monthly
- Format: Ongoing series
- Publication date: List: (vol. 1) July 2001 – June 2004 (vol. 2) September 2012 – June 2013
- No. of issues: List: (vol. 1): 46 + one Annual (vol. 2): 13 + one Point One issue (vol. 3): 5
- Main character: X-Men

Creative team
- Written by: List: (vol. 1) Chris Claremont (vol. 2) Greg Pak (vol. 3) Gerry Duggan
- Penciller: List: (vol. 1) Salvador Larroca Igor Kordey (vol. 2) Stephen Segovia Paco Diaz (vol. 3) Javier Pina Dylan Burnett Marco Checchetto
- Inker: List: (vol. 1) Salvador Larroca (vol. 2) Dennis Crisostomo

X-Treme X-Men is the name of two comic book series published by Marvel Comics, the first from 2001 through 2004, and the second from 2012 through 2013. All 46 issues of the first series were written by Chris Claremont, and featured a globetrotting X-Men team led by Storm. The first 24 issues were drawn by Salvador Larroca, and the final 22 issues were drawn by Igor Kordey.

Volume 2 of X-Treme X-Men featured a cast of X-Men characters from alternate dimensions, but led by Dazzler from the main Earth-616 universe. The series was written by Greg Pak. The thirteenth and final issue was released in April 2013.

== Volume 1 ==
Volume 1 of the series originated as part of a revamp of the X-Men line of comics in 2001. Prior to this revamp, Claremont was writing both of the main X-Men titles (Uncanny X-Men and X-Men, the latter of which became New X-Men, and then X-Men: Legacy). He was removed from both core X-titles by Editor-in-Chief Joe Quesada when his storylines fell apart due to editorial interference by the previous editor-in-chief in a failed attempt to capitalize on the first X-Men movie. Quesada offered Claremont the opportunity to write only one of the core X-titles (while allowing new X-writer Grant Morrison to have partial storyline input) or to write a third, new core X-Men title. Claremont chose the latter. That title was dubbed X-Treme X-Men.

In May 2004, prompted by Grant Morrison's departure from New X-Men, Marvel felt that another revamp of the X-Men titles was required. As part of this revamp, called X-Men Reload, Chris Claremont returned to writing Uncanny X-Men. X-Treme X-Men was cancelled, with most of its cast and running plotlines being transferred to Uncanny X-Men. Joss Whedon and John Cassaday's Astonishing X-Men replaced it as the third core title.

=== Team roster ===
The X-Treme X-Men contained Storm, Rogue, Gambit, Bishop, Sage (Tessa), Thunderbird (Neal Shaara), Psylocke and Beast as original line up. Psylocke was killed and Beast departed the title in the early goings, and new recruits Lifeguard (Heather Cameron) and Slipstream (Davis Cameron) were eventually added. Later in the series, familiar X-Men characters Cannonball, Lila Cheney, Shadowcat, Magma and Sunspot made regular appearances, with only Cannonball officially joining the team. Evangeline Whedon (a mutant with the ability to transform into a dragon) also made numerous appearances.

The title also introduced the character of Red Lotus, who featured heavily in the Australian arc, and was included in issues of the invasion arc.

| Issues | Characters |
|---|---|
| #1-4 (2001) | Beast, Bishop, Psylocke, Rogue, Sage, Storm, Thunderbird |
| #5-19 (2001–2002) | Bishop, Gambit, Lifeguard, Rogue, Sage, Slipstream, Storm, Thunderbird |
| #20-30 (2003) | Bishop, Cannonball, Sage, Storm, Wolverine |
| #31-35 (2003–2004) | Bishop, Cannonball, Gambit, Rogue, Sage, Storm |
| #36-39 (2004) | Storm, Callisto, Strong Guy, Yukio |
| #40-46 (2004) | Bishop, Cannonball, Gambit, Magma, Rogue, Sage, Storm |

=== Story ===
The first arc (issues 1–4) concerns the quest on the part of Storm and a number of X-Men chosen by her to find Destiny's thirteen diaries, which predict the future. The arc also introduces Vargas (a new foe who is disturbed by the diaries' predictions of his death), who kills Psylocke in order to test the diaries' predictions. He also heavily injures Beast, which leads to the character's transition to New X-Men.

In the second arc (Savage Land 1–4), the team travel to the Savage Land, where they escort the Saurids to a land where they will not be persecuted. The team tangles and defeats Brainchild, who makes Storm lose control of her powers for a time.

Cover for X-Treme X-Men #5.

The third arc (issues 5–9) involves Gambit in Australia and the warring gangs. Mafia leader Viceroy dies mysteriously and the team must protect his mutant children Heather and Davis, who were unaware that Viceroy was their father. The mafia and police accuse Gambit of murder of the gang leader and Bishop and Rogue take charge to clear his name. As a team learns Lady Mastermind and Sebastian Shaw are behind everything, the two villains capture Shaw's former assistant, Sage. Caught between the two villains and a mafia gang war, the team is able to rescue Sage and clear Gambit's name. Heather and Davis join the X-Men as Lifeguard and Slipstream, respectively.

In the next story arc (issues 10–18), the team again reunites with Gambit in Madripoor and deals with the invasion of the armies of Khan, an inter-dimensional conqueror. Gambit seeks to obtain Storm's mother's ruby which was part of a set that, when empowered, could open a portal between dimensions. Since some gems are already missing, Gambit wants to ensure that Storm's ruby remains safe. However, Gambit is attacked by an other-dimensional warrior named Shaitan, capturing Gambit and stealing the ruby. Shaitan then uses the gems and Gambit's mutant ability to empower them, thus opening the portal for Khan. Storm's X-Men oppose and defeat the invaders, but not before Storm is seriously injured.

Sage activates all of the powers that Rogue has ever imprinted at once, enabling Rogue to turn the tide of the battle. During the melee, Vargas returns to kill Rogue, after the diaries predicted she would kill him. As Rogue is attempting to save Gambit, she gets trapped by that same energy that empowers the portal. While they are trapped, Vargas impales them both with a broadsword. Rogue uses the strength of Wolverine and the Hulk to overcome her injury, though Gambit remains close to death. Rogue finds Vargas and fights him to avenge Psylocke's death and his attempted murder of her and Gambit, as predicted in the diaries. The fight is filmed by a news crew and just as the camera loses power, Rogue is shown standing over Vargas with a sword, poised to strike. It is not actually shown if she kills him or not.

In the midst of the battle in Khan's invasion platform, Lifeguard's power reacts unexpectedly, transforming her into a golden Shi'ar-like form. Slipstream reacts badly to this and runs off to parts unknown. The team succeeds in defeating Khan as other heroes join in the relief efforts. Storm, Rogue, and Gambit, all near death, are saved with the arrival of Jean Grey, Nightcrawler, and Beast. With the help of Beast's surgical expertise, Jean telepathically pulls Storm and Rogue from the abyss of death, and helps Rogue do the same for Gambit. Lifeguard and Thunderbird leave the title with this arc, going after Slipstream.

In the next few issues (19 and X-Posé 1–2) (arcs 6 and 7), while the team is recuperating, they have dinner with their old teammates. However, it's made quite clear that Xavier's views have changed and a philosophical rift begins. The team deals with the public relations aspect of what they do. The team attempts to keep a mutant documentary on the air, despite efforts to kill it because it is not derogatory. The team succeeds, but another old teammate, Archangel, refuses to allow them to manipulate the media that way.

Issues 20-23 (arc 8) deal with a young mutant killer seeking asylum at Xavier's Institute. Emma Frost promptly kicks out members Sage and Bishop when they visit because she believes that mutants should police themselves. The team breaks into the mansion to bring the boy to the proper authorities. However, a possessed Emma intercepts them. She is possessed by Elias Bogan, an old acquaintance from the Hellfire Club who she and Sage have met before. After an argument with Professor X elsewhere, Storm arrives to help her teammates. However, old emotions rise to the surface as Storm fights Emma Frost. Emma shakes the possession outside the mansion during the fight, but they continue to battle until Storm shows that she is willing to kill Emma and has the ability to do so. Bogan proves to be the threat behind the murders. Storm and Emma pull it together long enough to facilitate the rest of the team's escape, who then stop Bogan, though certainly not for good. The philosophical rift between the two groups of X-Men reaches its peak when the X-Treme X-Men promise not to return to the mansion again until the dream of peaceful coexistence is, once again, the goal the X-Men, instead of what the X-Treme X-Men believe to be isolationism and possible mutant supremacy.

The return of Cannonball takes place in issue 24 and issues 25-30 (arcs 10 and 11) contain a story line dealing with William Stryker, a follow-up to Claremont's 1982 X-Men: God Loves, Man Kills graphic novel.

Issues 31-35 (arc 12) see the return of Rogue and Gambit. Storm offers her team's services to the United Nations as a global mutant police force, the X-Treme Sanctions Executive (XSE), wherein mutants will continue to be bound by the human laws, but be policed by other mutants. They succeed as the government is searching for a way to contain the mutant threat. Also, the team fights against powerful mutants who have taken over a town in California and are pushing out the human inhabitants by force. This begins back and forth attacks between mutants and humans, while the team tries to establish peace and bring the aggressors to justice. Though the team doesn't discover it, Elias Bogan is secretly influencing events.

Issues 36-39 deal with one of Storm's missions as part of XSE (i.e., exposing mutant slave trading network and gladiatorial battle arena in Japan). Issues 40-45 again deal with the threat posed by Elias Bogan trying to get his final revenge on the group. The final issue, issue 46, shows Kitty Pryde returning to the X-Men fold and the X-Treme team deciding what to do next: return to the Xavier Institute or find a different path.

=== Series run ===
- X-Treme X-Men Vol. 1 #1-46
- X-Treme X-Men Annual 2001
- X-Treme X-Men: Savage Land #1-4
- X-Treme X-Men X-Pose #1-2
- X-Treme X-Men Mekanix (starring Shadowcat) #1-6

== Volume 2 ==
X-Treme X-Men was relaunched as a new series in 2012 with no connection to the previous volume and a concept similar to Exiles, featuring Dazzler, Sage, and alternate dimensional versions of familiar X-Men characters, such as Howlett, an alternate Wolverine, Kurt Waggoner, a younger version of Nightcrawler, and Corporal Scott Summers, a Civil War-era African-American version of Cyclops. The series is written by Greg Pak and is a spinoff of his 2011 "Exalted" storyline from Astonishing X-Men. The series' parallel universe hopping concept is similar to the previous Marvel series Exiles.

The "X-Termination" event ended the series with issue #13. The storyline crosses over with Astonishing X-Men and the Age of Apocalypse series.

=== Story ===
The team's mission is to explore the multiverse and hunt down ten evil versions of Professor X after an inter-universe teleportation awakens them. So far, the team have defeated three: one on a world where mutants are gods, another in a wild-west scenario, and an Acanti controlled by a Brood Queen. After those two missions, Kurt Waggoner takes a detour to his home reality, with Dazzler and Howlett giving chase. They rescued him with some unexpected assistance from Sage, who has been ambassador of S.W.O.R.D. since she was last seen with the Exiles.

Afterward, they were reunited with Xavier, who since recruited an alternate Cyclops, Dazzler, and Hercules to help. The teams merged and the alternate Dazzler died facing a Witch King Xavier in the next reality, prompting 616 Dazzler to take her costume. In the next reality, Namor fought a Nazi Xavier and Dazzler was able to kill Nazi Xavier. However, Witch King Xavier faked his death and controlled the team's Xavier while resurrecting Nazi Xavier. The three Xaviers fled into another reality, sacrificing the natives to gain more power. The X-Treme X-Men followed and freed their Xavier. Unfortunately, the power source the other Xaviers used grew and killed them, opening a rift in the multiverse that swallowed the natives. The team got away in time and followed the rift, leading into the X-Termination crossover with Astonishing X-Men and Age of Apocalypse.

During the crossover, AoA Nightcrawler's trip home resulted in the release of three evil beings that destroy anyone they touch. Several casualties resulted, including the AoA's Nightcrawler, Sabretooth, Horror Show, and Fiend, as well as the X-Treme X-Men's Kurt Waggoner, Xavier and Hercules. The crossover ends with the apparent destruction of the AoA universe. The surviving X-Treme X-Men team members, Dazzler, Sage, Howlett, and Corporal Summers all remain on Earth-616.

=== Roster ===
| Issues | Characters |
|---|---|
| #1-3 | Dazzler, Kurt Waggoner, James Howlett, Emmeline Frost, Xavier (detached head) |
| #4-7 | Dazzler, Kurt Waggoner, James Howlett, Xavier (detached head) |
| #7.1-9 | Dazzler, Kurt Waggoner, James Howlett, Sage, Xavier (detached head) |
| #7.1-13 | Dazzler, Kurt Waggoner, James Howlett, Sage, Xavier (detached head), Corporal Scott "Cyclops" Summers, Hercules (alternate) |

== Collected editions ==
=== Volume one ===
| Title | Material Collected | Publication Date | ISBN |
|---|---|---|---|
| X-Treme X-Men, Volume 1: Destiny | X-Treme X-Men #1-9 | May 2003 | ISBN 0-7851-0841-6 |
| X-Treme X-Men: Savage Land (Volume 1.5) | X-Treme X-Men: Savage Land #1-4 | April 2002 | ISBN 0-7851-0869-6 |
| X-Treme X-Men Volume 2: Invasion | X-Treme X-Men #10-18 | December 2002 | ISBN 0-7851-1018-6 |
| X-Treme X-Men Volume 3: Schism | X-Treme X-Men #19-23, X-Pose #1-2 | July 2003 | ISBN 0-7851-1084-4 |
| X-Treme X-Men Volume 4: Mekanix | Mekanix #1-6, X-Men Unlimited #36 | June 2003 | ISBN 0-7851-1117-4 |
| X-Treme X-Men Volume 5: God Loves, Man Kills | X-Treme X-Men #25-30, original God Loves, Man Kills story by Chris Claremont | December 2003 | ISBN 0-7851-1254-5 |
| X-Treme X-Men Volume 6: Intifada | X-Treme X-Men #24, 31-35 | March 2004 | ISBN 0-7851-1230-8 |
| X-Treme X-Men Volume 7: Storm - The Arena | X-Treme X-Men #36-39 | April 2004 | ISBN 0-7851-0936-6 |
| X-Treme X-Men Volume 8: Prisoner Of Fire | X-Treme X-Men #40-46, Annual 2001 | August 2004 | ISBN 0-7851-1351-7 |

Omnibus collections of X-Treme X-Men (Volume 1)
| Title | Material Collected | Publication Date | ISBN |
|---|---|---|---|
| X-Treme X-Men By Chris Claremont, Volume 1 | Uncanny X-Men (1981) #389, X-Men (1991) #109, X-Treme X-Men (2001) #1-24 and X-Treme X-Men Annual 2001, X-Treme X-Men: Savage Land #1-4, X-Treme X-Men X-Posé #1-2, and material from X-Men Unlimited (1993) #36 | July 2022 | ISBN 978-1302946395 |
| X-Treme X-Men By Chris Claremont, Volume 2 | X-Treme X-Men (2001) #25-46; Mekanix #1-6; X-Women #1; material from X-Men Unlimited #39 | August 2024 | ISBN 978-1302954031 |

=== Volume two ===
| Title | Material Collected | Publication Date | ISBN |
|---|---|---|---|
| X-Treme X-Men Volume 1: Xavier Must Die! | X-Treme X-Men vol. 2 #1-5 | February 2012 | ISBN 0-7851-6564-9 |
| X-Treme X-Men Volume 2: You Can't Go Home Again | X-Treme X-Men vol. 2 #6-11, 7.1 | August 2013 | ISBN 0-7851-6565-7 |
| X-Men: X-Termination | X-Treme X-Men vol. 2 #12-13, Age of Apocalypse #13-14, Astonishing X-Men #60-61, X-Termination #1-2 | July 2013 | ISBN 0-7851-8443-0 |
