= Thunderbird (Neal Shaara) =

- Thunderbird as depicted in X-Men Unlimited #27 (June 2000). Art by Brett Booth.

Publication information
- Publisher: Marvel Comics
- First appearance: X-Men (vol. 2) #100 (March 2000)
- Created by: Chris Claremont; Leinil Francis Yu

In-story information
- Alter ego: Neal Shaara
- Species: Human mutant
- Team affiliations: X-Men; X-Corporation
- Abilities: Plasma generation; Superhuman strength, speed, durability, and stamina

Thunderbird (Neal Shaara) is a character appearing in American comic books published by Marvel Comics. The character was depicted briefly as a member of the X-Men. Created by writer Chris Claremont and artist Leinil Francis Yu, he first appeared in X-Men (vol. 2) #100 (May 2000). He is the first Indian member of the X-Men.

An Indian pyrokinetic, he has no connection to the previous X-Men characters called Thunderbird (John Proudstar and James Proudstar).

== Fictional character biography ==
=== Early life ===
Neal Shaara comes from an affluent family in Kolkata, where his father is the city's chief of police. When his brother Sanjit disappears, Neal decides to investigate, against his parents' wishes. After Karima Shapandar saves him from a group of thugs, the two begin a romantic relationship while they search for Sanjit.

Neal and Shapandar are captured by the villain Bastion, who plans to turn them into Prime Sentinels as he has done to Sanjit. However, the shock of the transformation causes Neal's latent mutant powers to manifest, the power to generate and control solar plasma and heat.

Sanjit disables the other Sentinels, but is severely wounded in the attempt. Shapandar, who is able to temporarily defy her programming, tells Neal to leave her as her own transformation process commences, which will result in her killing him when the transformation is complete.

=== Psylocke ===
While with the X-Men, Thunderbird struggles with his fear of killing or hurting someone with his plasma. In addition, he also falls in love with the X-Man Psylocke, even though she is in a relationship with Archangel. Thunderbird and Psylocke often engage in flirtatious behavior in front of Archangel, who makes his displeasure felt to Thunderbird. The couple eventually breaks up, and Psylocke pursues a romantic relationship with Thunderbird.

=== X-Treme X-Men ===
For a short while, Thunderbird and five other X-Men form a splinter group of X-Men dubbed the X-Treme X-Men, cutting all ties with the rest of the team while searching for Destiny's diaries. He trains with Psylocke to gain better control of his powers, and learns to use only a small amount of plasma to blind or singe opponents. Psylocke is later killed by Vargas, leaving behind a grief-stricken Thunderbird. The X-Men are later joined by Lifeguard, who enters a relationship with Thunderbird.

=== X-Corporation ===
Thunderbird and Lifeguard join the organization X-Corporation in Singapore. Following a synchronized attack on several of the X-Corporation offices after the catastrophic events of M-Day, Cyclops calls for X-Corporation to disband. During the Krakoan Age, Thunderbird applies to rejoin X-Corporation.

== Powers and abilities ==
Thunderbird can transform the molecules of his body into solar plasma, enabling him to convert portions of himself into thermodynamic energy furnaces that release luminescent radiance, pyrotechnic displays, concentrated plasma beams, shaped plasma charges that can deflect solid matter or displace volumes of air on impact for a heatless release of concussive force, and explosive thrust from his legs for flight or projection of focused blasts, flashes, or explosive spheres. Thunderbird can also use his power to generate sufficient propulsive thrust to fly at supersonic speeds.
