= X-Men =

Marvel Comics superhero team of mutants

- Variant cover of X-Men (vol. 6) #2 (August 2021) depicting the first elected Krakoan X-Men team (clockwise from left): Synch, X-23, Sunfire, Marvel Girl, Rogue, Polaris, and Cyclops. Art by Mahmud A. Asrar.

Publication information
- Publisher: Marvel Comics
- First appearance: The X-Men #1 (September 1963)
- Created by: Stan Lee (writer); Jack Kirby (artist/co-plotter)

In-story information
- Base(s): Current: • The Factory; Merle, Alaska • Haven House; New Orleans, Louisiana; Former: • Xavier's School for Gifted Youngsters/Jean Grey School for Higher Learning/Xavier Institute for Mutant Education and Outreach; Westchester County, New York • Cooterman's Creek; Outback • Utopia; San Francisco, California • The Treehouse (Krakoan base); New York City • The Morlocks' Alley; New York Sewer System; New York City
- Member(s): Alaska: Animalia, Beast, Cyclops, Greycrow, Glob Herman, Juggernaut, Kid Omega, Magik, Magneto, Psylocke, Temper, Xorn; Louisiana: Gambit, Jubilee, Nightcrawler, Penance, Quicksilver, Rogue, Wolverine; Former: See List of X-Men members

The X-Men are a superhero team in American comic books published by Marvel Comics. Created by writer/editor Stan Lee and artist/co-plotter Jack Kirby, the team first appeared in The X-Men #1 (September 1963). Although initially cancelled in 1970 due to low sales, following its 1975 revival and subsequent direction under writer Chris Claremont, it became one of Marvel Comics's most recognizable and successful franchises. The X-Men title may refer to the superhero team itself, the eponymous comic series, or the broader franchise, which includes various solo titles and team books, such as the New Mutants, Excalibur, and X-Force.

In the Marvel Universe, mutants are humans born with a genetic trait called the X-gene, which grants them natural superhuman abilities, generally manifesting during puberty. Due to their differences from most humanity, mutants are subject to prejudice and discrimination; many X-Men stories feature social commentary on bigotry, justice, and other political themes. The X-Men have fought against various enemies, including villainous mutants, human bigots, supervillains, mystical threats, extraterrestrials, and evil artificial intelligences. In most iterations of the team, they are led by their founder, Charles Xavier / Professor X, a powerful telepath who runs a school for mutant children out of his mansion in Westchester, New York, which secretly is also the headquarters of the X-Men.

Their stories have frequently involved Magneto, a powerful mutant with control over magnetic fields, who is depicted as an old friend of and foil to Xavier, acting as an adversary or ally. An enormous cast of characters have joined the X-Men at various times. The original X-Men, introduced in 1963, are Cyclops, Jean Grey, Beast, Warren Worthington III, and Iceman. Well-known X-Men added to the team in 1975 include Colossus, Nightcrawler, Storm, and Wolverine. The X-Men have been adapted in numerous television shows, the X-Men films, and video games.

== Background and creation ==
In 1963, following the success of the Fantastic Four, co-creator Stan Lee wanted to create another group of superheroes. Unlike Lee's earlier creations such as Spider-Man, who acquired their powers through different scientific means, Lee decided that this new group of heroes were "mutants", born with latent powers as he had grown weary of creating separate origins for each superhero.

In a 1987 interview, Kirby said:

The X-Men, I did the natural thing there. What would you do with mutants who were just plain boys and girls and certainly not dangerous? You school them. You develop their skills. So I gave them a teacher, Professor X. Of course, it was the natural thing to do, instead of disorienting or alienating people who were different from us, I made the X-Men part of the human race, which they were. Possibly, radiation, if it is beneficial, may create mutants that'll save us instead of doing us harm. I felt that if we train the mutants our way, they'll help us – and not only help us, but achieve a measure of growth in their own sense. And so, we could all live together.

Lee's initial name was "the Mutants," but Marvel publisher Martin Goodman rejected this on the grounds that readers would not know what a "mutant" was.

While the X-Men are often assumed to have been named after Professor X, the original explanation for the name, provided by Xavier in The X-Men #1 (1963), is that mutants "possess an extra power ... one which ordinary humans do not!! That is why I call my students ... X-Men, for EX-tra power!"

== Publication history ==
=== 1960s ===
The original X-Men members who were created by Stan Lee and Jack Kirby, showing their original design

The first issue, cover-dated September 1963, introduces the original team, with Marvel Girl presented as a new pupil at Charles Xavier's school, apparently the first female student, meeting Cyclops, Beast, Angel, and Iceman. Cyclops, whose eyes shoot powerful beams unless they are controlled by a visor, is the central protagonist. Beast is apelike in appearance but speaks in sophisticated diction; Iceman is hedonistic and energetic; Angel comes from a wealthy background and has wings protruding from his back; and Marvel Girl is hyperfeminine. The masculine characters often express their attraction to Marvel Girl. The first issue also introduces the team's archenemy, Magneto. Magneto appears frequently throughout the series.

The X-Men issues #4 and #5 introduce Magneto's Brotherhood of Evil Mutants, featuring Mastermind and Toad. Quicksilver and Scarlet Witch were initially introduced in issue #4 as members of the Brotherhood, but later reformed and joined the Avengers. The comic focused on a common human theme of good versus evil; issue #8 first introduces the theme of prejudice against mutants, which eventually comes to function as an allegory for racism or other forms of bigotry. Issue #12 introduces Cain Marko, the Juggernaut, Professor Xavier's stepbrother, and implies that Marko was responsible for the accident that paralyzed Xavier. Issues #14 to #16 (November 1965 - January 1966) introduce the Sentinels, mutant-hunting robots designed by Bolivar Trask. The title lagged in sales behind Marvel's other comic franchises. Writer Roy Thomas and Werner Roth replaced Lee and Kirby by issue #20 (May 1966). Issue #28 introduces Banshee; initially an antagonist, Banshee will go on to become a member of the X-Men.

In 1969, Thomas and illustrator Neal Adams briefly rejuvenated the comic book. They gave regular roles to two recently introduced characters: Alex Summers (Cyclops' brother, later known as Havok, who had been introduced by Roy Thomas before Adams began work on the comic) and Lorna Dane, later called Polaris (created by Arnold Drake and Jim Steranko). Issue #64 introduced Sunfire, a Japanese mutant. However, these later X-Men issues failed to attract sales and Marvel stopped producing new stories with issue #66 (March 1970), later reprinting a number of the older comics as issues #67–93.

=== 1970s ===
Giant-Size X-Men #1 (May 1975). Cover art by Gil Kane and Dave Cockrum.

In Giant-Size X-Men #1 (1975), writer Len Wein and artist Dave Cockrum introduced a new team; the new characters then featured in a reboot of the ongoing X-Men series, which Chris Claremont began writing with issue #94, with Cockrum continuing as illustrator. Cyclops was the only original member who remained; differing from the original, the group became "an international cadre of mutants with diverse and often traumatic personal histories". Unlike in the early issues of the original series, the new team was not made up of teenagers. Marvel's corporate owners, Cadence Industries, had suggested the new team should be international, feeling it needed characters with "foreign appeal". So each character was from a different country with varying cultural and philosophical beliefs, and all were already well-versed in using their mutant powers, several being experienced in combat.

The "all-new, all-different X-Men" were led by Cyclops, and consisted of the newly created Colossus (from the Soviet Union/Russia), Nightcrawler (from Germany), Storm (from Kenya), and Thunderbird (a Native American of Apache descent), and three previously introduced characters: Banshee (from Ireland), Sunfire (from Japan), and Wolverine (from Canada). Wolverine had been previously introduced as an antagonist of the Hulk. However, this team would not remain whole for long; Sunfire quit shortly after their first mission, and Thunderbird died on the next. Filling in the vacancy, a revamped Jean Grey soon rejoined the X-Men. Claremont emphasized the character development of Grey, whose powers increased dramatically as she adopted a new name, Phoenix, in issue #101 (October 1976). Angel, Beast, Iceman, Havok, and Polaris also made significant guest appearances. Claremont introduced a significant non-mutant supporting character, Moira MacTaggert, in issue #96; MacTaggert operates a genetic research facility on Muir Island. Claremont became known for his strong female characters, sometimes called "Claremont Women." The series presents Storm and Phoenix as close friends, in a manner that scholar Ramzi Fawaz views as allegorical for alliances between liberal feminists and emerging Black feminism. 1977 presented a new space opera story line, "The Phoenix Saga", that particularly emphasizes the alliance of these two characters; Fawaz calls it "arguably the most canonical story line in The X-Men's publishing history." The story includes the Shi'ar Empire, Lilandra Neramani, and the Starjammers.

Beginning with issue #108 (December 1977), John Byrne replaced Cockrum as the primary artist. Claremont and Byrne had previously collaborated on the Iron Fist and Luke Cage series. Their run met with critical acclaim, and produced such landmark storylines as the introduction of Alpha Flight and the Proteus saga.

Wolverine is initially overshadowed by the other characters, although he creates tension in the team as he is attracted to Jean Grey, who is Cyclops' girlfriend. While Claremont considered writing Wolverine out of the series, Byrne advocated for his continuing inclusion, partly because the character is Canadian and this is also Byrne's nationality. Wolverine became increasingly developed and popular as a character, becoming the breakout character on the team. X-Men #100 introduces the "fastball special", a combat maneuver in which the super-strong Colossus throws Wolverine at a distance as if he were a projectile weapon; this tactic recurs in many future battles. Stories of the late 1970s establish Wolverine's murky past and unstable nature, which he battles to keep in check. Wolverine's name was revealed as "Logan" in X-Men #103 (February 1977); X-Men #116 (December 1978) first introduces Wolverine's healing factor, and issue #124 (August 1979) first suggests that he has a reinforced skeleton.

=== 1980s ===
The 1980s began with the comic's best-known story arc, the "Dark Phoenix Saga", which saw Phoenix manipulated by Mastermind, now a member of the Hellfire Club, and becoming corrupted with an overwhelming lust for power and destruction as the evil Dark Phoenix. The Hellfire Club also included the telepathic femme fatale Emma Frost, who became an increasingly significant character. The story results in the death of Jean Grey. The disco singer mutant, Dazzler, previously introduced in her own miniseries, also appeared in the story and eventually joined the X-Men. This story arc also introduces a new character, the exuberant young girl Kitty Pryde. Thirteen years old, Pryde is Marvel's first canonically Jewish superhero. Immediately after, Claremont and Byrne created "Days of Future Past", in which Wolverine and Kitty Pryde experience a dystopian future for mutants. Mystique first encounters the X-Men in this story, becoming a recurring antagonist. Byrne left the series shortly after its completion. The Morlocks, deformed mutants who live underground, first appear in The Uncanny X-Men #169 (May 1983). In 1983, Cyclops meets Madelyne Pryor, eventually revealed as a clone of Jean Grey. Other important storylines include the saga of Deathbird and the Brood, the invasion of the Dire Wraiths and The Trial of Magneto!, as well as X-Men: God Loves, Man Kills, the partial inspiration for 20th Century Fox's film X2: X-Men United (2003). In this period, Claremont and Byrne particularly emphasized the theme that mutants are oppressed by human bigotry.

Uncanny X-Men #227 (March 1988) by Chris Claremont and Marc Silvestri

By the early 1980s, X-Men was Marvel's top-selling comic title. Its sales were such that distributors and retailers began using an "X-Men index", rating each comic book publication by how many orders it garnered compared to that month's issue of X-Men. The growing popularity of Uncanny X-Men led to the introduction of a number of ongoing spin-off series, such as the ongoing New Mutants, about a younger adjunct team, which began in 1982. As Fawaz puts it, "Unlike the X-Men, the New Mutants were brought together not for the purposes of an egalitarian peace-keeping mission but to learn the proper use of their powers, which they experienced as monstrous physical burdens threatening their own safety and that of their loved ones." He describes them as presenting the "most diverse cast of any mainstream superhero comic," including Karma (Vietnamese), Danielle Moonstar (Cheyenne), Sunspot (Brazil), Cannonball (southern U.S.), and Wolfsbane (Scotland), and Magik (Russia). In 1984, Claremont collaborated with Bill Sienkiewicz for the New Mutants' "Demon Bear Saga", which was critically acclaimed.

Spin-off miniseries included the first four-issue Wolverine solo miniseries (September–December 1982), by Claremont and Frank Miller, as well as the following six-issue Kitty Pryde and Wolverine by Claremont and Al Milgrom (Nov. 1984 – April 1985). Other miniseries included Storm and Illyana: Magik (1983) and X-Men and the Micronauts. In 1983, Alpha Flight, a group of Canadian superheroes created by Byrne as Wolverine's original team, received their own ongoing series.

Comics scholar Douglas Wolk describes autumn 1985 as the "peak of X-Men's world beating phase", when a single month produced the double-sized Uncanny X-Men #200, the two-part miniseries X-Men/Alpha Flight, an X-Men Annual, a New Mutants Special Edition, and Heroes for Hope, a fundraiser for relief of the 1983-1985 famine in Ethiopia. The following year, a new series began, resurrecting Jean Grey and re-uniting the original X-Men under the name X-Factor. The series was initially written by Bob Layton, without Claremont's participation.

In a controversial move, Professor X relocated to outer space to be with Lilandra Neramani, Majestrix of the Shi'ar empire, in 1986. Magneto then joined the X-Men in Xavier's place and became the director of the New Mutants. The Darwinian villain Apocalypse first appeared in X-Factor #6 (July 1986). Longshot who had been first introduced in his own miniseries the previous year, joined the X-Men in Annual #10 (1986). Longshot came from another dimension called the Mojoverse, ruled by a mad dictator obsessed with TV named Mojo, who also became a recurrent adversary of the X-Men.

When Claremont conceived a story arc in 1986, the "Mutant Massacre", which was too long to run in the monthly X-Men, editor Louise Simonson decided to have it overlap into several X-Books. In the story, many of the Morlocks are slaughtered by new villains, the Marauders. The story line brought Sabretooth into conflict with the X-Men and particularly Wolverine. The story was a major financial success.

In 1987, Claremont wrote a new crossover, "The Fall of the Mutants", in which the team appears to have been killed but actually relocates to Australia. In the course of the story, Angel has his wings removed; Apocalyapse turns him into a cyborg and replaces them with new mechanical wings, and he takes on the name "Archangel." Over the next years, the main title had multiple disconnected protagonists. Sales began to decline. The success of the crossovers Mutant Massacre and The Fall of Mutants in countering these flagging sales led the editors to decide internally that multi-title crossover stories would appear annually.

Mister Sinister, another villain fixated on Darwinism like Apocalypse, first appeared in The Uncanny X-Men #221 (1987). Marvel launched an ongoing Wolverine title written by Claremont with art by John Buscema in November 1988. Uncanny X-Men #235 (October 1988) introduces the oppressive nation of Genosha, an allegory for apartheid in South Africa. 1989 saw the publication of the Inferno crossover, in which the X-Men struggle to rescue Magik from demonic forces. The Uncanny X-Men #244 (May 1989) introduces Jubilee, a Chinese American teenager, to the X-Men team. Marc Silvestri became one of the most prominent artists for the series in the late 1980s.

In the Claremont era, Storm is the most prominent character and the main protagonist. The shapeshifter Mystique is the most commonly appearing villain of the period. Other new additions to the X-Men during this time were Rogue, Psylocke, and Forge.

- X-Men
  - Uncanny X-Men, vol. 1 (flagship) – A reformed Magneto became the headmaster after Xavier had left Earth (1985–1988); the team later relocated to the Outback after the events of The Fall of the Mutants (1988–1989).
  - X-Factor, vol. 1 – The original five X-Men set up a business advertised as mutant-hunters for hire, and secretly trained the captured mutants to control their powers and reintegrate them into society (1986–1991).
  - Excalibur, vol. 1 – Nightcrawler, Shadowcat and Rachel Grey teamed up with Captain Britain and Meggan to form a group of mutants based in Europe after the apparent death of the X-Men during The Fall of the Mutants (1988–1992).
- X-Men in Training
  - New Mutants, vol. 1 – a group of teenaged students of the School for Gifted Youngsters gathered by Professor X.
- Other Teams
  - Alpha Flight, vol. 1 – Canada's premiere team of super-heroes organized under the auspices of the Canadian government's Department H.

=== 1990s ===
Gambit first appeared in Uncanny X-Men #266 (Aug. 1990) and became one of the most popular X-Men of the decade, also pursuing a romance with Rogue. The "X-Tinction Agenda" crossover took place in 1990, featuring artists Jim Lee, Rob Liefeld, and Jon Bogdanove. In August 1991, the New Mutants title was cancelled and replaced by X-Force, a best-selling title written and illustrated by Liefeld. In this series, the New Mutants join a more militant team led by a mysterious cyborg, Cable.

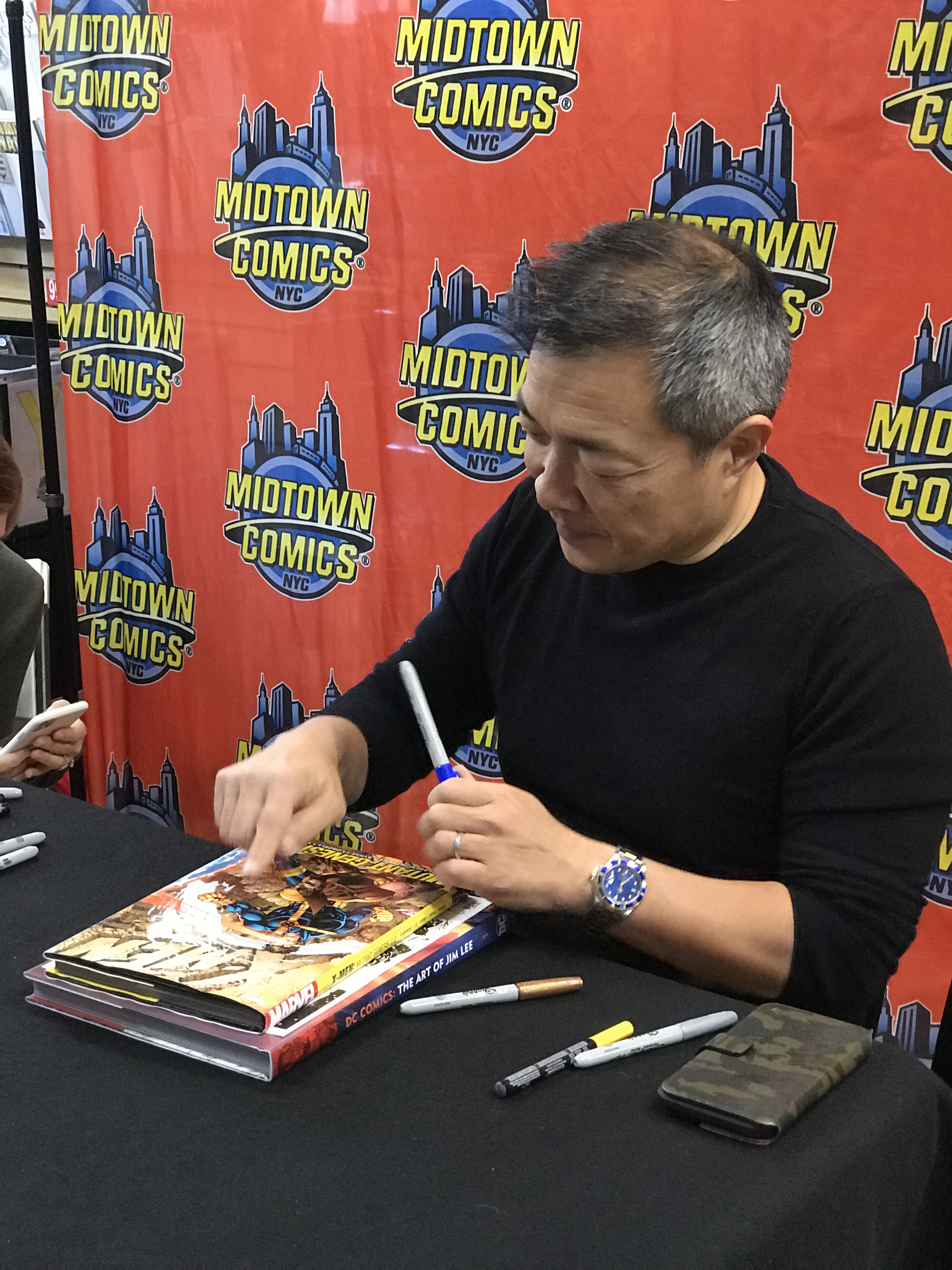
Artist Jim Lee signing a hardcover collected edition of his work on X-Men (Vol 2) at Midtown Comics in Manhattan

In October 1991, Marvel revised the entire lineup of X-Men comic book titles, centered on the launch of a second X-Men series, simply titled X-Men. Initially written by Claremont and illustrated by Jim Lee, the first issue of this series is the highest selling comic book issue in history, selling more than eight million copies. Retailers pre-ordered over 8.1 million copies of issue #1, generating and selling nearly $7 million (though retailers probably sold closer to 3 million copies), making it, according to Guinness Book of World Records, the best-selling comic book of all time. Guinness presented honors to Claremont at the 2010 San Diego Comic-Con.

With the return of Xavier and the original X-Men to the team, the roster was split into two strike forces: Cyclops's "Blue Team" (chronicled in X-Men) and Storm's "Gold Team" (in The Uncanny X-Men). A new character, Bishop, a soldier from another dystopian future, soon joined the Gold Team.

Internal friction soon split the X-books' creative teams. In a controversial move, X-Men editor Bob Harras sided with Lee (and Uncanny X-Men artist Whilce Portacio) over Claremont in a dispute over plotting. Claremont left after only three issues of X-Men, ending his 16-year run as X-Men writer. At the time of his departure, he was the longest-running author of the series. Marvel replaced Claremont briefly with John Byrne, who scripted both books for a few issues. Byrne was then replaced by Fabian Nicieza and Scott Lobdell, who would take over the majority of writing duties for the X-Men until Lee's own departure months later when he and several other popular artists (including former X-title artists Liefeld, Portacio, and Marc Silvestri) would leave Marvel to form Image Comics. Jim Lee's designs would be the basis for much of X-Men: The Animated Series.

Lobdell and Nicieza, along with Peter David, wrote a new crossover series with artists such as Brandon Peterson, Jae Lee, Andy Kubert, and Greg Capullo, centered on battles with Cable's clone, Stryfe. The story revealed that Cable is actually the son of Cyclops and Madelyne Pryor, who grew to adulthood in an alternate future and returned to the present by means of time travel. The "Fatal Attractions" crossover in late 1993 concerned the return of Magneto, who ripped out Wolverine's adamantium skeleton, leading to his taking a leave of absence from the team. Gambit also appeared in his own miniseries, beginning in November 1993. Cyclops and Jean Grey got married in X-Men #30 (March 1994). In November 1994, a next generation of students began with Generation X, featuring Jubilee and other teenage mutants led and schooled by Banshee and ex-villainess Emma Frost at her Massachusetts Academy. Rogue also starred in her own miniseries, beginning in January 1995.

1995 saw "Age of Apocalypse", a massive crossover in which all the X-Men related titles were temporarily cancelled and replaced by new miniseries taking place in a dystopian future, recalling the earlier Days of Future Past series. This was followed by "Onslaught" in 1996, "Operation: Zero Tolerance" in 1997, "The Hunt for Xavier" in 1998, "The Magneto War" in 1999, "Apocalypse: The Twelve" / "Ages of Apocalypse" in 2000 and "Eve of Destruction" in 2001. Though the frequent crossovers were criticized by fans as well as editorial and creative staff for being artificially regular, disruptive to the direction of the individual series, and having far less lasting impact than promised, they continued to be financially successful.

- X-Men
  - Uncanny X-Men, vol. 1 (flagship) – initially featured the Gold Team strike force led by Storm (1991–1995); later featured a team of X-Men recruited by Gladiator to defend the Shi'ar empire against the Phalanx (1997); the Gold and Blue strike force merged to face new threats including Onslaught, Dark Beast, Shadow King and Magneto (1997–2000). The title is replaced by Astonishing X-Men during the Age of Apocalypse event.
  - X-Men, vol. 2 – initially featured the Blue Team strike force led by Cyclops (1991–1995); later featured a new core group consisting of Cannonball, Cyclops, Jean Grey, Storm and Wolverine took on Sebastian Shaw and Bastion during the events of Operation: Zero Tolerance (1997); members of the Excalibur team joined the combined Gold and Blue strike force (1997–2000). The title is replaced by Amazing X-Men during the Age of Apocalypse event.
- X-Men in Training
  - Generation X, vol. 1 – students at the Massachusetts Academy mentored by Banshee and the former villain White Queen (1994–2001). The title is replaced by Generation Next during the Age of Apocalypse event.
- Other Teams
  - X-Factor, vol. 1 – the new team worked for the Pentagon replacing Freedom Force as the government-sponsored team (1991–1997); Forge later leads the mutant team as an underground government strike force (1997–1998). The title is replaced by Factor X during the Age of Apocalypse event.
  - X-Force, vol. 1 – Cable re-organized the New Mutants into the para-military mutant strike team (1991–1995); the team move in with the X-Men at the X-Mansion and effectively become the X-Men's junior team (1995–1997); the team later move to San Francisco to set up a new headquarter (1997–2001). The title is replaced by Gambit & the X-Ternals during the Age of Apocalypse event.
  - Excalibur, vol. 1 – the British team expanded and stays with Moira, making Muir Island their new base (1992–1998). The title is replaced by X-Calibre during the Age of Apocalypse event.

=== 2000s ===
Sales for the comics had declined at the turn of the century, at the same time that the film series had rekindled interest in the X-Men. Ultimate X-Men, written by Mark Millar and illustrated by Andy Kubert and Adam Kubert began in February 2001. The series took place in an alternate version of the Marvel Universe, co-existing with Ultimate Spider-Man. The reboot imagined many of the primary characters as teenagers.

In July of the same year, X-Men had its title changed to New X-Men and writer Grant Morrison took over. Morrison made drastic changes, beginning with "E Is For Extinction", where a new villain, Cassandra Nova, destroys Genosha, killing sixteen million mutants. Morrison also brought reformed ex-villain Emma Frost into the primary X-Men team, and opened the doors of the school by having Xavier "out" himself to the public about being a mutant. Jean Grey was again killed off. The bright spandex costumes that had become iconic over the previous decades were replaced by black leather street clothes reminiscent of the uniforms of the X-Men films. Morrison also introduced Xorn, who would figure prominently in the climax of his run. In the same month, X-Force was revamped under indie comics writers Peter Milligan and Mike Allred; the series was absurdist, darkly comic, and critically acclaimed, but met with a mixed reaction from fans. The entire line-up of the group was replaced, with Doop the most notable new character. In September, the series changed its name to X-Statix. Another series, Exiles, also began in July. The Cable title also changed its name, to Soldier X.

Chuck Austen began his controversial run on Uncanny X-Men. In 2000, Claremont returned to Marvel and was put back on the primary X-Men titles during the Revolution revamp. He was later removed from the titles in 2001 and created his spin-off series, X-Treme X-Men. Several short-lived spin-offs and miniseries started featuring several X-Men in solo series, such as Emma Frost, Mystique, Cyclops, Iceman, Blink, Chamber, Mekanix (featuring Kitty Pryde), and Nightcrawler. Additions to the X-Men in the early 2000s include Emma Frost, Danielle Moonstar, Husk and Northstar while former villain Juggernaut joined the X-Men. Story arcs of this era include "E Is For Extinction" (2001), "Planet X" and "Here Comes Tomorrow".

In July 2004, Joss Whedon, creator of the hit television show Buffy the Vampire Slayer, became the writer of the new title Astonishing X-Men, with John Cassaday as artist. The series returned the characters to their traditional superhero costumes.

Chris Claremont moved from writing X-Treme X-Men to writing Uncanny X-Men, with Alan Davis doing the art. Chuck Austen moved from writing Uncanny X-Men to New X-Men, which returned to its old name of simply X-Men, with Salvador Larroca, who had been working with him on Uncanny X-Men doing the art. X-Treme X-Men was cancelled. X-Statix ended in October 2004. Also, the X-Men returned to more traditional (if not slightly revised) costumes, as opposed to the black leather uniforms from the movies. New X-Men: Academy X was also launched focusing on the lives of the new young mutants at the institute. This period included the resurrections of Colossus and Psylocke, a new death for Jean Grey, who later returned temporarily in the X-Men: Phoenix - Endsong, as well as Emma Frost becoming the new headmistress of the institute.

August 2005 began the House of M crossover, written by Brian Michael Bendis. In January 2006, the outcome of the story was that Scarlet Witch manipulated reality to depower 98% of the mutant population. The institute, formerly run as a school, served as a safe haven to mutants who are still powered.

Several short-lived spin-offs and miniseries started featuring several X-Men in solo series, such as Nightcrawler, Jubilee, Madrox, X-23, Gambit and Rogue. Cable and Deadpool's books were merged into one book, Cable & Deadpool.

Additions to the X-Men during this era include Armor, Pixie and Warpath, while former villains such as Lady Mastermind, Mystique, and Sabretooth became members of the X-Men. Story arcs of this decade include "Gifted" (2004), "House of M" (2005), "Deadly Genesis" (2005–2006), "Decimation" (2006) and "Endangered Species" (2007). The X-Men were also involved in the "Civil War" and "World War Hulk" storylines.

In September 2006, Storm married Black Panther.

In 2007, the "Messiah Complex" storyline saw the destruction of the Xavier Institute and the disbanding of the X-Men. It spun the new volume of Cable, following Cable's attempts at protecting Hope Summers. X-Men was renamed into X-Men: Legacy which focused on Professor X, Rogue, and Gambit. Under Cyclops's leadership, the X-Men later reformed in Uncanny X-Men #500, with their new base located in San Francisco. In April 2008, a new X-Force series was launched, now led by Wolverine. Joss Whedon's run of Astonishing X-Men ended in July 2008.

In 2009, "Messiah War," written by Craig Kyle and Chris Yost to serve as the second part in the trilogy that began with "Messiah Complex," was released. Utopia, written by Matt Fraction, was a crossover of Dark Avengers and Uncanny X-Men that served as a part of the "Dark Reign" storyline. A new New Mutants volume written by Zeb Wells, which featured the more prominent members of the original team reunited, was launched. Magneto joined the X-Men during the Nation X storyline to the dismay of other members of the X-Men, such as Beast, who left the team. Magneto began to work with Namor to transform Utopia into a homeland for both mutants and Atlanteans. After the conclusion of Utopia, Rogue became the main character of X-Men: Legacy.

Several short-lived miniseries started featuring several X-Men in solo series, such as Daken, Cable, Psylocke, Namor: The First Mutant and X-23. Additions to the X-Men during this era include Pixie, Karma, Sunspot, Magma, Magik, Namor, Domino, Boom Boom, Fantomex and X-23. Other story arcs of the late 2000s are "Divided We Stand" (2008), "Manifest Destiny" (2008–2009), "X-Infernus", "Utopia" (2009), "Nation X" (2009–2010), "Necrosha" (2009), "Curse of the Mutants" (2010–2011), and "Age of X" (2011). The X-Men were also involved in the "Secret Invasion", "War of Kings", "Siege", "Chaos War" and "Fear Itself" storylines.

- X-Men
  - New X-Men, vol. 1 (flagship) – The X-Men took in dozens of students expanding the school from a training center to a legitimate school (2001–2004).
  - Uncanny X-Men, vol. 1 – Nightcrawler and Angel co-lead the X-Men's primary field team to face new threat (2001–2004).
  - X-Treme X-Men, vol. 1 – Storm formed a globe-trotting team to hunt down missing copies of the Destiny's Diaries (2001–2004).
  - Astonishing X-Men, vol. 3 (flagship) – Cyclops leads the team of X-Men and they start presenting themselves as superheroes again.
  - Uncanny X-Men, vol. 1 – Storm and her team continued operating as officially sanctioned mutant law enforcers (2004–2006); post Deadly Genesis, it featured Xavier taking a team to space to hunt Vulcan when he seeks vengeance on the Shi'ar empire (2006–2007); the team returned to Earth to fight a group of rogue Morlocks (2007).
  - X-Men, vol. 2 – Havok led a new field team consisting of Polaris, Iceman, Rogue, Gambit, Wolverine and Juggernaut (2004–2006); later featured Rogue assembling a rapid response team featuring the most dangerous X-Men former villains (2006–2007).
  - Uncanny X-Men, vol. 1 (flagship) – The X-Men open their new base in San Francisco and invite the world's mutant to join them (2008–2009); Cyclops later decided to move the mutant population to Utopia and off U.S. soil to avoid further persecution by the government (2009–2011).
  - X-Men Legacy, vol. 1 – featured Professor X's road to recovery as well as the encounters he faced during Messiah CompleX (2008–2009); later featured Rogue as mentor to the younger mutants under the protection of the X-Men on Utopia (2009–2011).
  - New Mutants, vol. 3 – the original team is reunited to form a new field team for the X-Men.
  - Astonishing X-Men, vol. 3 – the X-Men serve as protectors of San Francisco City.
  - X-Men, vol. 3 – featured team-ups between characters of X-Men and other superheroes such as Blade, Spider-Man, Ghost Rider and the Future Foundation.
- X-Men in Training
  - New Mutants, vol. 2 – features a new group of teenage mutants attending the Xavier Institute.
  - New X-Men: Academy X – the school is rebuilt after Xorn's attack and Emma Frost and Cyclops are named headmasters, organizing the student body into different squads who train together.
    - New X-Men, vol. 2 – After House of M and Decimation, Emma Frost disbands all former training squads and integrates the students she deems capable of combat to a new team.
  - Young X-Men – a group of young mutants tricked by Donald Pierce disguised as Cyclops.
  - Generation Hope – Hope leads a new team, consisting of five new mutants ("five lights") that appeared on Cerebro after she manifested her powers.
- Other Teams
  - Exiles, vol. 1 – a revolving team roster from different realities, which have been removed from time and space, employed by the Timebroker to fix broken realities. Later the team learned the true nature of the Timebroker and later traveled through different realities to chase Proteus.
  - X-Statix – featured a group of young mutants marketed to be media superstars.
  - NYX – featured a group of teenage mutants as they attempt to survive on the streets of New York City.
  - Weapon X, vol. 2 – featured The Underground, a group assembled by Cable to oppose the activities of the third installment of the Weapon X project. Later featuring Wolverine, Fantomex and Agent Zero quest to find the recently revived Sublime.
  - Excalibur, vol. 3 – Professor X and Magneto formed a team to rebuild the devastated mutant nation of Genosha.
  - X-Factor, vol. 3 – a mutant detective agency founded by Jamie Madrox based on Mutant Town.
  - New Excalibur – After Decimation, Captain Britain brings together a new team of Excalibur as the British government decided to become more pro-active with superhuman affairs.
  - District X – Bishop is assigned to the Mutant Town to investigate rising crime rates.
  - X-Force, vol. 2 – Cable re-assembles the team to stop an immortal creature called Skornn.
  - X-Force, vol. 3 – Wolverine leads a more militaristic black-ops branch of the X-Men.
  - X-Factor, vol. 3 – the agency briefly moved to Detroit, Michigan and expanded to include several new partners.
  - Exiles, vol. 2 – a new team of heroes are brought together by Morph, acting as the new Timebroker.

=== 2010s ===
In 2010, "Second Coming" concluded the plot threads on Messiah Complex and Messiah War. Nightcrawler died in X-Force #26 (June 2010). In 2011, the aftermath of the "X-Men: Schism" storyline led to the fallout between Wolverine and Cyclops. During the "Regenesis" storyline, Wolverine's team was featured in a new flagship series titled Wolverine and the X-Men, Wolverine rebuilt the original X-Mansion and named it the Jean Grey School for Higher Learning. Meanwhile, Uncanny X-Men relaunched for the first time ever and served as the flagship title for Cyclops' Team. In 2012 "Avengers vs. X-Men" served as a closure to the "House of M" and "Decimation" storylines. It featured the death of Professor X and the reappearance of new mutants after the return of the Phoenix Force. Several short-lived miniseries started featuring several X-Men in solo series, such as Storm, Gambit and Magneto: Not a Hero (featuring Magneto and Joseph). Additions to the X-Men during this era include Warbird and Blink.

In 2012, as part of the Marvel NOW! relaunch, all X-Men titles (except Astonishing X-Men & Wolverine and the X-Men) were canceled, including Uncanny X-Men, X-Men: Legacy, X-Men and New Mutants. New flagship title All-New X-Men was launched which featured the original five X-Men members who were brought to the present day by Beast and were made a separate team led eventually by Kitty. The relaunched Uncanny X-Men featured Cyclops, his team and the new mutants, taking up residency in the Weapon X facility, which they have rebuilt into a school — the New Charles Xavier School for Mutants. An all female book titled simply X-Men was also launched. During All-New Marvel Now!, Astonishing X-Men was cancelled and in its place another flagship title Amazing X-Men was launched which featured the return of Nightcrawler and became the flagship title of Wolverine's team. Also, Wolverine and the X-Men was relaunched and turned into mutants-in-training book. In 2013, for the 50th anniversary of the X-Men, "Battle of the Atom" was published which involved members of both X-Men schools trying to decide what to do about the time-displaced original X-Men, culminating in a confrontation with a version of the Brotherhood and the X-Men from an unspecified future date. In 2014, Wolverine was killed off in the "Death of Wolverine" story arc, as the conclusion of a storyline that saw him lose his healing factor after he was infected by an intelligent virus.

Variant cover of Extraordinary X-Men #17, Dec. 2016 (flagship series of this era) during the "Inhumans vs. X-Men" story arc. Art by Jorge Molina.

In 2015, as part of "All-New, All-Different Marvel", three team books were launched: the second volume of All-New X-Men, the fourth volume of Uncanny X-Men and Extraordinary X-Men.

=== 2020s ===
==== Krakoan Age ====
On May 14, 2019, Marvel announced they would cancel all the X-Men titles and relaunch the entire lineup. Jonathan Hickman would have full creative control; this began with two rotating bi-weekly six-issue limited series called House of X and Powers of X. The two series saw Krakoa, a living island who previously fought the X-Men, established as a mutant nation. After the 12 issues were released, Hickman penned the flagship title and several new and traditional titles were released. It was subsequently announced in July 2019 at San Diego Comic-Con that there would be six new X-titles as part of Marvel's Dawn of X campaign. Following the end of the X of Swords crossover, the sequel relaunch Reign of X encompassed a new era in the X-titles. Destiny of X featured the Second Krakoan Age of X-Men after the events of Inferno and X Lives of Wolverine/X Deaths of Wolverine. Mutantkind's unparalleled growth and prosperity on the island nation Krakoa was threatened during the Fall of X by the human supremicist organization Orchis. Marvel teased the X-Men's final battle for Krakoa's future in the two interconnected titles Fall of the House of X and Rise of the Powers of X.

The series Immortal X-Men follows the Quiet Council of Krakoa, Krakoa's ruling body. X-Men Red follows the Great Ring of Arakko, the ruling body of Krakoa's sister island Arakko, under regent Storm. Various other titles, including Marauders, The New Mutants, Fallen Angels, X-Force, Hellions, X-Factor, Way of X, X-Corp, Legion of X, X-Terminators, Sabretooth & the Exiles, Bishop: War College, Realm of X, and Dead X-Men, follow the residents of Krakoa. Other titles, following other characters, include S.W.O.R.D., Children of the Atom, Uncanny Avengers, Dark X-Men, and Alpha Flight.

==== X-Men: From the Ashes ====
The Krakoan Age ended with Krakoa and many of its residents relocating to the White Hot Room, a realm located outside the multiverse, after an attack by Orchis. With Krakoa largely inaccessible, the X-Men are scattered across Earth as they attempt to rebuild following the Krakoan Age. This era introduced flagship titles for X-Men, Uncanny X-Men, and Exceptional X-Men, new volumes for X-Force, NYX, X-Factor, and Weapon X-Men, solo series for Jean Grey, Wolverine (Logan), Storm, Dazzler, Mystique, Psylocke, Wolverine (Laura Kinney) and Magik, and a new series for Sentinels.

Additions to the X-Men during this era include Kid Omega, Temper (an X-Men trainee formerly known as Oya), and Jennifer Starkey, a new character introduced in the series X-Men who later becomes known as Animalia. Story arcs of this era include "Raid on Graymalkin" (2024), "X-Manhunt" (2025), "Giant-Size X-Men" (2025), "Age of Revelation" (2025), and "DNX" (2026). The X-Men were also involved in the "Blood Hunt" and "One World Under Doom" storylines. In the fallout of the Krakoan Age, Kamala Khan becomes an associate of the X-Men and later joins X-Force, having learned that she was part-mutant shortly before the Krakoan Age ended.

The relaunch "X-Men: Shadows of Tomorrow" sees the X-Men united in the aftermath of "Age of Revelation". The announcement confirmed continuation of the series X-Men, Uncanny X-Men, and Wolverine, new ongoing series Inglorious X-Force, Generation X-23, and Wade Wilson: Deadpool, and new limited series Storm: Earth's Mightiest Mutant, Cyclops, Rogue, and Magik & Colossus. A later announcement was made for a new ongoing series X-Men United and limited series for Moonstar, Bishop, Jean Grey and Fugitive X-Force.

== Team roster ==
The founding members of the X-Men were Angel, Beast, Cyclops, Iceman, and Jean Grey. Various other sub-teams and training groups have been introduced throughout the X-Men's history, with some of the members of these groups going on to join the main X-Men team.

== Enemies ==
The X-Men have a rogues gallery of enemies they fight on a regular basis, the most well-known being Magneto, the mutant Master of Magnetism and Professor X's former friend. Other popular enemies include the shapeshifting Mystique, the ancient mutant Apocalypse, the mad scientist Mister Sinister, the mutant-hunting Sentinel robots, villain teams such as the Brotherhood of Evil Mutants and the Hellfire Club, and discrimination from humans.

== Themes and motifs ==
Many recurring plot devices and motifs have been used for the various story arcs over the years which have become commonplace within the X-Men canon.

=== Social issues ===
Characters in the X-Men franchise espouse a variety of political ideologies, and these differences are a frequent catalyst for conflict. The most prominent ideological clash in the X-Men franchise is that between Xavier and Magneto; Byrne argues that Lee originally modelled the two on Franklin D. Roosevelt and Adolf Hitler, respectively, despite later interpretations of the two as analogues for Martin Luther King Jr. and Malcolm X that Lee endorsed. Writer Chris Claremont (who originated Magneto's backstory and history with Xavier) saw them as more comparable to David Ben-Gurion and Menachem Begin. Xavier's ideology has drawn comparisons to assimilationism and model minority politics, while Magneto, originally depicted as a mutant supremacist, is later portrayed as a liberationist advocating self-determination through mutually assured destruction. Callisto is a separatist, who seeks to protect the Morlocks through isolationism. Emma Frost is portrayed as rejecting social movements, opting to use the capitalist system for her personal benefit, or for that of individual mutants in her care. Apocalypse is characterized as a social darwinist who believes that mutants can only survive through the rule of might. The Mutant Liberation Front commits acts of terrorism to liberate mutants wrongly incarcerated by the government. Even when individual characters expressing conflicting ideologies are portrayed as either misguided or villainous, their motives and beliefs are often treated by the X-Men with nuance, sympathy, and respect; for example, during Secret Wars, when the Avengers take issue with Magneto's placement among the heroic team by The Beyonder, the X-Men defend him as an ally, despite disagreeing with his methods; although eventually they come to accept him as an ally. Captain America even speaks in his defense on some occasions. Pulitzer-winning national security journalist Spencer Ackerman has stated on the Cerebro podcast that "the importance of the X-Men as a universe of stories, as a mythos, is that we should always be debating who is right."

The conflict between mutants and normal humans is often compared to real-world conflicts experienced by minority groups in America such as religious groups, ethnic and racial minorities, autistic individuals, and the LGBTQ community. It has been remarked that attitudes towards mutants do not make sense in the context of the Marvel Universe, since non-mutants with similar powers are rarely regarded with fear; X-Men editor Ann Nocenti remarked that "I think that's literary, really – because there is no difference between Colossus and the Torch. If a guy comes into my office in flames, or a guy comes into my office and turns to steel, I'm going to have the same reaction. It doesn't really matter that I know their origins. ... as a book, The X-Men has always represented something different – their powers arrive at puberty, making them analogous to the changes you go through at adolescence – whether they're special, or out of control, or setting you apart – the misfit identity theme."

The X-Men are hated, feared and despised collectively by humanity for no other reason than that they are mutants. So what we have here, intended or not, is a book that is about racism, bigotry and prejudice.

— Uncanny X-Men writer Chris Claremont, 1981
- Racism: Although this was not initially the case, Professor X has come to be compared to civil rights movement leader Martin Luther King Jr. and Magneto to the more militant Malcolm X. X-Men comic books have often portrayed mutants as victims of mob violence, evoking images of the lynching of African Americans in the age before the civil rights movement. Sentinels and anti-mutant hate groups such as Friends of Humanity, Humanity's Last Stand, the Church of Humanity, and the Purifiers are thought to often represent oppressive forces like the Ku Klux Klan giving a form to denial of civil rights and amendments.

1980s storylines involving the fictional island nation of Genosha, where mutants are segregated and enslaved by an apartheid state, are widely interpreted as a reference to the contemporary situation of apartheid in South Africa. Chamber (2002) explicitly cites the Norman Rockwell painting The Problem We All Live With. The miniseries portrays using the mutant context affirmative action, National Guard troops escorting a new student, sympathetic and antagonistic majority members, and majority-supremacist terrorism. Some mutants avoid confrontation and seek integration, while more militant mutants play the race card, reject their human-given names, and denounce those who do not as Stepin Fetchit and Uncle Tom.

- Antisemitism: Explicitly referenced in recent decades is the comparison between antimutant sentiment and antisemitism. Magneto, a Holocaust survivor, sees the situation of mutants as similar to those of Jews in Nazi Germany. The mutant slave labor camps on the island of Genosha, in which numbers were burned into mutant's foreheads, show much in common with Nazi concentration camps, as do the internment camps of the classic "Days of Future Past" storyline.
- Diversity: Characters within the X-Men mythos hail from a wide variety of nationalities. These characters also reflect religious, ethnic or sexual minorities. Examples include Kitty Pryde/Shadowcat, Magneto and Sabra who are of Jewish descent. Dust, Ms. Marvel, and M who are Muslim, Nightcrawler who is a devout Catholic. Neal Shaara/Thunderbird who is Hindu. Jubilee is Chinese American, Gambit is born to Cajun parents from New Orleans and Rogue is from Caledecott County, Mississippi both of whom are Southerners. Warpath and his brother, the Thunderbird, are Native Americans of Apache descent. Storm represents two aspects of the African diaspora as her father was African American and her mother was Kenyan. Karma was portrayed as a devout Catholic from Vietnam, who regularly attended Mass and confession when she was introduced as a founding member of the New Mutants. This team also included Wolfsbane (a devout Scottish Presbyterian), Danielle Moonstar (a Native American of Cheyenne descent), Cannonball, and was later joined by Magma (a devout Greco-Roman classical religionist). Different nationalities included Wolverine, Aurora, Northstar, Deadpool and Transonic from Canada; Colossus and Magik from Russia; Banshee and Siryn from Ireland; Dust from Afghanistan; Psylocke, Wolfsbane and Chamber from the United Kingdom; Sunfire, Armor, Surge and Zero from Japan; Sunspot from Brazil; M from Monaco; Nightcrawler from Germany; Sabra from Israel; Omega Sentinel, Neal Shaara, Kavita Rao, Indra and Trinary from India; Velocidad from Mexico; Oya from Nigeria; Primal from Ukraine; etc.
- LGBT themes: Some commentators have noted the similarities between the struggles of mutants and the LGBT community, noting the onset of special powers around puberty and the parallels between being closeted and the mutants' concealment of their powers. In the comics series, gay and bisexual characters include Anole, Bling!, Destiny, Karma, Mystique, Psylocke, Courier, Northstar (whose marriage was depicted in the comics in 2012), Graymalkin, Rictor, Shatterstar, Shade, the Ultimate version of Colossus and later Iceman after revealing that he is a mutant; the comics version of the character was then revealed to be gay in 2015. Transgender issues also come up with shapechangers like Mystique, Copycat, and Courier who can change gender at will. It has been said that the comic books and the X-Men animated series delved into the AIDS epidemic with a long-running plot line about the Legacy Virus, a seemingly incurable disease thought at first to attack only mutants (similar to the AIDS virus which at first was spread through the gay community).
- Communism and socialism: Occasionally, undercurrents of the real-life "Red Scare" are present or the events of the Red Scare in history are alluded to. Senator Robert Kelly's proposal of a Mutant Registration Act is similar to the efforts of United States Congress to try to ban communism in the United States.
- Religion: Religion is an integral part of several X-Men storylines. It is presented as both a positive and negative force, sometimes in the same story. The comics explore religious fundamentalism through the person of William Stryker and his Purifiers, an antimutant group that emerged in the 1982 graphic novel God Loves, Man Kills. The Purifiers believe that mutants are not human beings but children of the devil, and have attempted to exterminate them several times, most recently in the "Childhood's End" storyline. By contrast, religion is also central to the lives of several X-Men, such as Nightcrawler, a devout Catholic, and Dust, a devout Sunni Muslim who wears an Islamic niqāb.
- Subculture: In some cases, the mutants of the X-Men universe sought to create a subculture of the typical mutant society portrayed. The Morlocks, though mutants like those attending Xavier's school, hide away from society within the tunnels of New York. These Morlock tunnels serve as the backdrop for several X-Men stories, most notably The Mutant Massacre crossover. This band of mutants illustrates another dimension to the comic, that of a group that further needs to isolate itself because society will not accept it. In Grant Morrison's stories of the early 2000s, mutants are portrayed as a distinct subculture with "mutant bands," mutant use of code-names as their primary form of self-identity (rather than their given birth names), and a popular mutant fashion designer who created outfits tailored to mutant physiology. The series District X takes place in an area of New York City called "Mutant Town."
- Genocide: Genocide and its psychological aftereffects, primarily survivor guilt, are recurring elements in some of the most significant X-Men story arcs. Magneto was a survivor of The Holocaust and witnessed the genocide of his people, severely scarring him emotionally and leaving him with a strong distrust of humanity. Because of this he constantly walks the line between ally and enemy of the X-Men. The iconic Days of Future Past story line saw an alternate future where Sentinels committed genocide on most of the world's mutants. In Rachel Summers' original timeline, she was captured by humans and turned into a 'hound' used to hunt down other mutants to capture and kill them, leaving her extremely traumatized by the experience and knowledge that she unwittingly assisted in the genocide of her own people. Bishop's childhood consisted of him being trapped in a mutant concentration camp, leaving him so emotionally scarred as an adult that upon returning to the past he was prepared to kill a baby who might have caused his future. When Cassandra Nova committed genocide on Genosha, the event left both Emma Frost and Polaris traumatized by survivor's guilt as they were amongst the limited few survivors. Other characters who have either committed or have survived genocide include Mystique, Callisto, Apocalypse, Onslaught, Bastion, Mister Sinister, Hope Summers, Cable, and the Phoenix Force.

=== Time travel ===
Many of the X-Men's stories delve into time travel either in the sense of the team traveling through time on a mission, villains traveling through time to alter history, or certain characters traveling from the past or future to join the present team. Story arcs and spin-offs that use this plot device include Days of Future Past, Messiah Complex, All-New X-Men, Messiah War, and Battle of the Atom. Characters who are related to time travel include: Apocalypse, Bishop, Cable, Old Man Logan, Prestige, Hope Summers, Tempus, and Stryfe. A major notable period in the X-Men's history began in 2012's All-New X-Men when Beast used time-travel to bring the original five 1960s X-Men into the present. These time-displaced characters starred in their own title, X-Men Blue, before returning to their original timeline in 2018's Extermination event.

=== Death and resurrection ===
One of the most recurring plot devices used in the X-Men franchise is death and resurrection, mostly in the sense of Jean Grey and her bond with the Phoenix. Though not as iconic as Jean and the Phoenix, many other X-Men characters have died and come back to life on occasion. Death and resurrection has become such a common occurrence in the X-books that the characters have mentioned on numerous occasions that they are not strangers to death or have made comments that death does not always have a lasting effect on them (for example, "In mutant heaven, there are no pearly gates, only revolving doors"). John Byrne even commented, "Oh my God, we've trained fans to expect that no death is actually permanent, even in the real world!" X-Necrosha is a particular story arc that sees Selene temporarily reanimate many of the X-Men's dead allies and enemies in order for her to achieve godhood. In the Krakoan era, the characters invent a method of resurrecting mutants who have died; becoming a significant story element across the various X-Men books.

=== Space travel ===
Space travel has been a common staple in the X-Men books beginning with the Phoenix and Dark Phoenix sagas. Since then space has been involved in many stories involving the X-Men's allies and occasional rivals the Shi'ar along with stories involving the Phoenix Force. Space has been the setting for many stories involving the likes of The Brood, such as the story arc where the villainous species was first introduced. Through space noteworthy characters like The Starjammers and Vulcan (lost brother of Cyclops and Havok) were introduced. Space travel played a major role in Joss Whedon's run on Astonishing X-Men via the introduction of S.W.O.R.D. and especially in one of the final story arcs under his authorship called "Unstoppable". Other notable story arcs involving space included "X-Men: The End", "Rise and Fall of the Shi'ar Empire", "X-Men: Kingbreaker", "War of Kings", and "The Black Vortex".

=== Media and popular culture ===
The character of Mojo, an extraterrestrial being and media mogul from the Mojoverse, satirizes the pervasive influence of media on society. Created by Nocenti and Art Adams, Mojo's grotesque appearance and obsession with television ratings comment on the exploitative nature of entertainment media. The character was influenced by Nocenti's readings of media critics such as Marshall McLuhan, Noam Chomsky, and Walter Lippmann. The X-Men's resistance against Mojo's tyranny is symbolic of the struggle against the monopolization of media and the fight for a free and independent press.

== Cultural impact and legacy ==
- The franchise has generated over $8 billion in income over the course of its history.
- The insecurity and anxieties in Marvel's early 1960s comic books such as The Fantastic Four, The Amazing Spider-Man, The Incredible Hulk, and X-Men ushered in a new type of superhero, very different from the certain and incredibly powerful superheroes before them, and changed the public's perception of superheroes.
- The superhero team has been described as an allegory to real-life struggles experienced by people rejected by society.
- Ramzi Fawaz argues that X-Men presents a feminist revision of the idea of a superhero team: "As a corollary to its critique of normative identity, The X-Men shifted the traditional locus of affective and political identification in mainstream superhero comics from white male heroes to powerful and racially diverse female superheroes whose emotional strength anchored mutant kinships and whose superpowers granted them unprecedented ability to reshape the material world."
- In 2022, British-American publisher Penguin Random House released a Penguin Classics edition of the early X-Men comics as part of a line of Penguin Classics editions of various Marvel comics.

== Other versions ==
- Age of Apocalypse – In a world where Professor X is killed by his son David/Legion before he can form the X-Men, Magneto leads the X-Men in a dystopian world ruled by Apocalypse. Created and reverted via time travel.
- Days of Future Past – Sentinels have either killed or placed into concentration camps almost all mutants. Prevented by the time-traveling Kate Pryde/Widget (the adult Kitty Pryde/Shadowcat).
- House of M – Reality is altered by Scarlet Witch, with her father Magneto as the ruler of Genosha and in which mutants are the dominant group with humans as second-class citizens. 2005's crossover event, it concludes with a reversion to the normal Marvel Universe, albeit with most mutants depowered.
- Marvel 1602 – Mutants are known as the "Witchbreed" in this alternate reality set during the time of The Inquisition. Carlos Javier creates a "school for the children of gentlefolk" to serve as a safe haven and training ground for which he calls mutantur (or changing ones) and normal humans (the mondani). The roster consists of the original 5 members and analogues of Sunspot, Pietro and Wanda Maximoff.
- Marvel 2099 – Set in a dystopian world with new characters looking to the original X-Men as history, becoming X-Men 2099 and X-Nation 2099.
- Marvel Noir – The X-Men of this reality are a group of delinquent teenagers led by Charles Xavier who believes that sociopathy is the next step in human evolution. Set in the 1930s, with the X-Men as a mysterious criminal gang and the Brotherhood as a secret society of corrupt cops.
- Time-displaced X-Men – The time-displaced team was introduced as such in All-New X-Men vol. 1 #1, by Brian Michael Bendis and Stuart Immonen, and brought to the present with time travel. They were kept as regular characters, as Bendis intended to explore their reactions to the fate of their adult selves. The team was the main focus of the Battle of the Atom crossover, some months later. Bendis also used them for crossovers with the Guardians of the Galaxy and Miles Morales, that he also wrote. This was one of the few crossovers between the Marvel Universe and the Ultimate Marvel universe; Bendis preferred to write them sparingly. All-New X-Men has a vol. 2 in 2015, by Dennis Hopeless and Mark Bagley. The comic was cancelled after the end of the Inhumans vs. X-Men crossover, and the team was now published in the X-Men Blue comic. The teenager Jean also got a solo series after the end of ResurrXion, by Hopeless and Victor Ibanez, that explored her relation with the Phoenix Force. The teenager Cyclops joins the Champions, a comic book focused on teenager heroes but unrelated to the X-Men mythos. They guest-starred in the Venom comic, in the "Poison-X" arc. The story took the villains from the Venomverse arc and led to the Venomized crossover. The team were featured in the Extermination crossover, where they went back to their original timeline.
- Ultimate X-Men – Set in the reimagined Ultimate Marvel universe. The X-Men are younger, wear black and gold uniforms and supernatural/cosmic elements are downplayed. Additionally Colossus is gay unlike his main universe counterpart, Magneto is not a Holocaust survivor and is more villainous, mutants were created by the Super-Soldier Serum, Cable is Wolverine and Kitty Pryde/Shadowcat dated Spider-Man.
- Ultimate Universe - Set in Earth-6160, a world preceded by alternative history thanks to the interference of the Maker. Mutants are seen as mysterious and a fringe presence to the world at large, a scattered, suppressed and unrecognized minority without central leaders due to the absence of Magneto and Professor X. A group of young outcast students led by Armor forms the X-Men to combat a cult of Homo Superior covertly researching their powers and believing themselves to be superior to the human race.
- X-Men Forever – An alternate continuity diverging from X-Men, vol. 2 #3, continuing as though writer Chris Claremont had never left writing the series.
- X-Men '92 – Follows "Secret Wars", the X-Men of the 1992 TV Series, received their own comic book series.

== In other media ==
The X-Men team has featured in multiple forms of media including the 20th Century Fox live-action film series, multiple animated shows, live-action shows, multiple video games, numerous novels, motion comics, soundtracks, action figures, and clothing.

== See also ==
- Doom Patrol, a similar team of super-powered misfits appearing in comics published by DC Comics
- List of Marvel Comics superhero debuts
