= Mutant (Marvel Comics) =

Group of comics characters

Publication information
- Publisher: Marvel Comics
- First appearance: X-Men #1 (September 1963)
- Created by: Stan Lee; Jack Kirby

Characteristics
- Place of origin: Earth
- Notable members: X-Men; X-Factor; X-Force; Dark X-Men; New Mutants; Brotherhood of Mutants; Acolytes; Morlocks; Quiet Council of Krakoa; Xavier Institute Student Body

In American comic books published by Marvel Comics, a mutant is a human being that possesses a genetic trait called the X-gene. It causes the mutant to develop superhuman powers that manifest at puberty. Human mutants are sometimes referred to as a human subspecies Homo sapiens superior or simply Homo superior. Mutants are the evolutionary progeny of Homo sapiens, and are often referred to as the next stage in human evolution. The accuracy of this is the subject of much debate in the Marvel Universe.

Unlike Marvel's mutates, which are characters who develop their powers only after exposure to outside stimuli or energies (such as Spider-Man, Captain America, Fantastic Four, Hulk), mutants have innate genetic mutations from birth.

== Publication history ==
=== Early antecedents ===
Officially, Namor the Sub-Mariner is considered the first mutant superhero whom Marvel Comics ever published, debuting in 1939. However, Namor was not actually described as a mutant until Fantastic Four Annual #1, decades after his first appearance. The same is true of Toro, partner of the android Human Torch introduced in 1940.

=== Modern concept and development ===
The modern concept of mutants as a distinct species independent of homo sapiens began development under Marvel writer and editor-in-chief Stan Lee in the early 1960s, as a means to create a large number of superheroes and supervillains without having to think of a separate origin for each one. As part of the concept, Lee decided that these mutant teenagers should, like ordinary ones, attend school in order to better cope with the world, in this case Xavier's School for Gifted Youngsters. Following the 1963 debut of this conception of mutants in the superhero series X-Men, Marvel later introduced several additional mutant superhero teams, including the New Mutants, X-Factor, Excalibur, X-Force, and Generation X.

In early X-Men stories, Xavier and others suggest that mutation is related to nuclear radiation, as his parents worked on the development of the atomic bomb, though later descriptions of mutation would describe it deriving from genetics. The first in-story mention of mutants in this context is in The X-Men #1, in which Xavier explains his school to the newly admitted Jean Grey: "You, Miss Grey, like the other students at this most exclusive school, are a mutant! You possess an extra power...one which ordinary humans do not!! That is why I call my students...X-Men, for Ex-tra power!" This issue also features the first reference to mutants as the species "Homo Superior" by Magneto. Following the relaunch under writer Chris Claremont, narration in stories taking place on Muir Island described Moira MacTaggert as "second only to Charles Xavier as an authority on genetic mutation." In the New Mutants graphic novel, after witnessing Wolfsbane demonstrate her mutant shapeshifting ability, MacTaggert refers to "an anomalous DNA matrix" in her blood signaling that Wolfsbane "could be a mutant." The cause of mutation was elaborated upon in the first issue of the spin-off series X-Factor, in which Cameron Hodge refers to "people who possess the X-Factor mutation in their genetic makeup." This genetic mutation was later dubbed the X-Gene. At one point, Beast states that the X-Gene is located on the 23rd chromosome; the process described is that the gene activates mutation producing a protein stimulating chemical signals which induce mutations on other genes.

Mutations are depicted as generally manifesting during adolescence, however this is not universal. Some mutants, such as Nightcrawler, are visibly mutated from birth, while others like Magneto do not develop their abilities until adulthood. Some mutants are not even aware of their latent mutations unless deliberately activated, such as Polaris, whose manifestation was triggered with technological aid.

=== Later developments ===
In the 2022 storyline, A.X.E.: Judgment Day, mutants are discovered by Eternals to be an offshoot of the Deviant race, triggering efforts by the Eternals' leader Druig to wipe them out, giving the mutants an explicit link to the Celestials and to the publisher's cosmic storylines.

== Mutant Subtypes ==
=== Changelings ===
Introduced in the second series of X-Factor, a changeling is a mutant whose powers manifest at birth. Jamie Madrox and Damian Tryp are examples of this sub-class.

=== Cheyarafim and Neyaphem ===
Cheyarafim and Neyaphem first appear in Uncanny X-Men #429. According to Azazel, the Cheyarafim are a group of angel-like mutants who were the traditional enemies of the Neyaphem, a demonic-looking group of mutants who lived in Biblical times. The Cheyarafim were fanatics who had a strict, absolutist view of morality that led them into conflict with the Neyaphem. This escalated into a holy war, causing the Neyaphem to be exiled into an alternate dimension. What happened to the Cheyarafim after this has not been revealed.

Angel and Icarus are said to be descended from Cheyarafim, while Nightcrawler is supposedly the son of a Neyaphem, Azazel.

=== Chimeras ===
Introduced in "House of X and Powers of X", the Chimeras are genetically altered humanoid mutants who are combined from the DNA of past mutants so that they would have combinations of their power set and also propagate the mutant population. Third generation Chimeras have a 10% failure rate, making them unable to be warriors. Fourth generation Chimeras have a corrupted hive mind. Chimeras are commonplace in Moira MacTaggert's ninth life, where they are created by Mister Sinister.

=== Dominant Species/Lupine ===
Maximus Lobo claims to be a part of a mutant sub-species of feral wolf-like mutants, whom he calls the Dominant Species. He later tries to recruit Wolf Cub into his ranks to no avail. A few years later, another mutant named Romulus claims that some human mutants evolved from canines instead of primates. Romulus' sister Remus would later consider his claim to be a hoax when she meets Wolverine.

- Daken
- Feral
- Romulus
- Sabretooth
- Thornn
- Wild Child
- Wolf Cub
- Wolfsbane
- Wolverine

=== Externals ===
Created by Rob Liefeld, Externals are immortal mutants whose powers have allowed them to exist for centuries. Eventually, most of the Externals are killed by Selene, and later by Apocalypse.

- Absalom
- Burke
- Candra
- Crule
- Gideon
- Nicodemus
- Saul
- Selene
- Apocalypse

=== "Homo superior superior" ===
Introduced in Chris Claremont's X-Treme X-Men, Vargas claims to be humanity's natural response to mutants. Vargas was born at the epitome of peak physical skill, having superhuman levels of strength, speed, reflexes, agility, stamina, and durability. Vargas also seems to be immune to various mutant abilities (such as Rogue's absorption and Betsy Braddock's telekinetic blast).

=== Hybrids ===
Mutants have been shown to successfully crossbreed or a result of crossbreed with humans (Homo sapiens), Atlanteans (Homo mermanus), fairies, and other humanoid aliens like Shi'ar, etc.

- Abigail Brand
- Kamala Khan
- Lifeguard
- Meggan
- Namor
- Namora
- Namorita
- Pixie
- Slipstream
- Xandra Neramani

=== Non-human mutants ===
Humans are not the only species to have mutant subspecies.

==== Extraterrestrial mutants ====
- Ariel
- Broo
- Cerise
- Deathbird
- Longshot
- Thanos
- Ultra Girl
- Warlock

==== Non-human Earth mutants ====
- Crosta
- Devil Dinosaur
- Don the Lobster
- Moon-Boy
- Val-Or

=== Other mutations ===
- Children of the Vault: A species of super-powered beings created from a temporally accelerated cargo ship. They are genetically distinct from humans and mutants.
- Neo: A secluded race similar to mutants with far stronger abilities.
- Rao Factor: Kavita Rao at one point examined Cindy Shears (Rhinoceress), a girl with a mutation "adjacent but legally distinct" from the X-Gene. Rao dubbed this the "Rao Factor".

== Mutants as metaphor ==
As a fictional oppressed minority group, mutants are often used as extended metaphors for real-world people and situations. In 1981, X-Men writer Chris Claremont said, "[mutants] are hated, feared and despised collectively by humanity for no other reason than that they are mutants. So what we have here, intended or not, is a book that is about racism, bigotry and prejudice."

Danny Fingeroth writes extensively in his book Superman on the Couch about the appeal of mutants and their meaning to society:

The most popular pop culture franchises are those that make the viewer/reader feel special and unique, while simultaneously making him or her feel he or she is part of a mass of people experiencing and enjoying the same phenomenon. The plight of the mutants is universally compelling. Many people feel a need for a surrogate family, one composed of those the world has abused and persecuted in the same way they have been their whole life. This is especially true in adolescents, which may in part explain some of the draw of mutants.

An obvious parallel between homosexuality and mutation is drawn in the feature film X2, where Iceman's mother asks, "Have you tried not being a mutant?" This question (or various forms thereof) is common among parents who find out their children are gay. In the 2011 film X-Men: First Class, Hank McCoy (later known as Beast), upon being outed at a colleague as a mutant, responds, "You didn't ask, so I didn't tell."

In his book Super Heroes: A Modern Mythology, Richard Reynolds writes:

[T]he whole theme of the X-Men — the isolation of mutants and their alienation from ‘normal’ society — can be read as a parable of the alienation of any minority. The original Magneto and his Brotherhood of Evil Mutants, who disdained to cooperate with homo sapiens, could be read as an example of a minority grouping determined to force its own place within society. Such oppositional readings of the X-Men are possible — gay readings of the mutant subtext have been fairly common in the letter columns over the years.

Reynolds has also, however, criticized such readings due to their warping of the comics' openness, nuance, and subtleties.

== Other versions ==
=== 1602 ===
In the setting of Marvel 1602, mutants are referred to as Witchbreed.

=== Earth X ===
Within the Earth X universe, the powers of the vast majority of Marvel's human superheroes are the result of genetic manipulation by the Celestials millions of years in the past.

=== Ultimate Marvel ===
In the Ultimate Marvel universe, the mutant gene was created by Weapon X, with James Howlett being the first mutant. At some later point, possibly during a confrontation between Magneto and his parents, the mutant trigger was released worldwide.

== In other media ==
=== X-Men film series ===
Mutants appear throughout the X-Men film series and animated media and games based on X-Men produced by 20th Century Fox, most of which closely adhere to the comic book explanations of mutant origins as humans born with a genetic difference that gives them special powers, the fact of which engenders discrimination from other humans due to the pitfalls of human nature. One liberty the films often take with X-Men characters is to simplify non-mutant characters in the X-Men franchise into mutants for simplicity's sake, as was the case with Deadpool and Juggernaut in the film series.

=== Marvel Cinematic Universe ===
Following The Walt Disney Company's acquisition of 21st Century Fox in 2019, the film rights to the X-Men and other mutant characters reverted to Marvel Studios. When asked if his use of the term "mutants" meant the film would be avoiding the term "X-Men", Marvel Studios president Kevin Feige clarified that he was using the two terms interchangeably. He added that Marvel Studios' approach to the characters would be different to Fox's franchise. Since 2022, members of the mutant race have appeared in various media set within the Marvel Cinematic Universe (MCU) media franchise:

- Mutants are first implicitly introduced through a variant of Charles Xavier from the alternate universe Earth-838 in the film Doctor Strange in the Multiverse of Madness (2022). Patrick Stewart reprises the role from Fox's X-Men film series.
- The first mutant belonging to the main reality of the MCU is Kamala Khan / Ms. Marvel (played by Iman Vellani), which is stated in the final episode of the television series Ms. Marvel (2022). This differs from the comics, where Khan is an Inhuman. A musical excerpt of the X-Men: The Animated Series (1992–1997) theme is featured in both Ms. Marvel and Multiverse of Madness. The comics version of Khan was later retconned to be a mutant-Inhuman hybrid to reflect the MCU.
- The television series She-Hulk: Attorney at Law (2022) features numerous implicit references and allusions to mutants from throughout Marvel Comics. A website article insinuating James "Logan" Howlett / Wolverine being active in the MCU is an easter egg in the episode "Superhuman Law", where he is indirectly described in an online news article regarding a man who "fights with metal claws" during a bar brawl. Additionally the series features supporting appearances from David Hollis / Mr. Immortal and Alejandro Montoya / El Águila, both of whom are mutants in the comics. The main-on-end credits of the episode "Mean, Green, and Straight Poured into These Jeans" depicts a visual of Augustus Pugliese displaying his sneaker collection to his colleague Nikki Ramos, with some designs derived from the appearances of Wolverine, Namor, Cyclops, Gambit and Cable. The series' finale "Whose Show Is This?", which depicts protagonist Jennifer Walters breaking the fourth wall by travelling to Marvel Studios to have the episode altered, features a conversation between herself and "K.E.V.I.N.", a fictionalized algorithm based on company president and producer Kevin Feige. Walters asks K.E.V.I.N. when the X-Men themselves would debut in the MCU, to which it declines to answer.
- In Black Panther: Wakanda Forever (2022), Namor (played Tenoch Huerta Mejía) retains his comics background as a mutant. In the film, his mother ingested a vibranium-laced plant while pregnant, giving him abilities that his people who consumed it did not due to his mutation, including pointed ears, winged ankles, the ability to breathe air and water, extended longevity, and his trademark ability to fly, which he calls sky-swimming. For his abilities, his subjects, called Talokanil, worship him as not merely a king, but rather an incarnation of a god.
- Kamala Khan returns in The Marvels (2023). In the mid-credits scene, a version of Hank McCoy / Beast meets Monica Rambeau after she enters a portal into a parallel universe. Kelsey Grammer reprises the role from Fox's X-Men films.
- Deadpool & Wolverine (2024) integrated Fox's X-Men film series' iterations of Wade Wilson / Deadpool and Wolverine into the continuity of the MCU, reprised by Ryan Reynolds and Hugh Jackman respectively. Other mutants featured in the film include Cassandra Nova, Pyro, X-23, Gambit, and Sabretooth, as well as the characters Azazel, Juggernaut, Lady Deathstrike, Psylocke, Toad and Blob.
- In Spider-Man: Brand New Day (2026), Jean Grey appears in the film, played by Sadie Sink. In the film, Jean's sister Sara also has similar telepathic powers, while in the comics, she is not a mutant.
- Avengers: Doomsday (2026) will feature mutants that have appeared in both the MCU and the Fox X-Men film series.
- A new X-Men film produced by Marvel Studios was reported by Deadline Hollywood to be in development in September 2023 following the conclusion of the 2023 Writers Guild of America strike, with executive meetings being internally held at the studio to take pitches from various writers before a selection is made sometime in early 2024.

== See also ==
- List of Marvel Comics characters
- Mutants in fiction
- Metahuman
- Superhuman
- Superpower (ability)
