= Shi'ar =

Fictional species of aliens appearing in Marvel comics

Publication information
- Publisher: Marvel Comics
- First appearance: X-Men #97 (February 1976)
- Created by: Chris Claremont (writer); Dave Cockrum (artist)

Characteristics
- Place of origin: Aerie; later moved to Chandilar
- Pantheon: Sharra and K'ythri
- Notable members: See Notable Shi'ar

The Shi'ar (/ʃiːˈɑːr/ SHEE-ar) are a fictional species of aliens appearing in American comic books published by Marvel Comics. The Shi'ar empire (or Imperium) is a vast collection of alien species, cultures, and worlds situated close to the Skrull and Kree empires. The Shi'ar are one of the three main extraterrestrial empires depicted in the Marvel Universe, alongside the Kree and Skrulls.

== Publication history ==
The Shi'ar first appeared in Uncanny X-Men #97 (Feb. 1976) and were created by writer Chris Claremont and artist Dave Cockrum.

== Biology ==
The Shi'ar are cold-blooded humanoids of avian descent; they resemble humans with feathered crests atop their heads in lieu of hair. Two different styles are common: most Shi'ar, particularly those of the aristocracy, have feathers sprouting in a triangular shape away from the face, one peak on the top of the head and one peak on each side slightly over the shoulder; the other commonly seen "hairstyle" is bushy on both sides and very flat on the top. The Shi'ar conceive their offspring in eggs.

Internally, they have lightweight and hollow bones, and on their forearms there are still some vestigial feathers left of wings that were lost over millions of years of evolution. The average Shi'ar can lift one ton in Earth-like gravity and has far greater stamina than the average human. Most Shi'ar have no other special abilities, though occasionally a genetic throwback appears possessing wings that allow for flight (an example of atavism). Also, some Shi'ar have telepathic abilities.

Some Shi'ar have developed superpowers such as Electron, Rook'shir, Deathcry, Dakari, White Noise and Black Light. Most of these are members of the Imperial Family and are descended from Rook'shir, who transmitted his Phoenix Force manipulation power to his descendants.

Unlike humans the Shi'ar do not dream, except for those born "defective" or "infected by dreams". Shi'ar who have the ability to dream and create do all they can to suppress their impulses. In the past, execution was a common remedy to such 'infections'. Such Shi'ar include Warbird and the Shi'ar having survived the Fianden's weapons. The Shi'ar have more chakras than a human.

== Technology ==
The Shi'ar possess technologies common to most Marvel alien races, including:

- Starships capable of moving faster-than-light
- Energy-based weapons in their ships and in their handheld weapons
- force fields
- Faster-than-light communication
- Teleportation technology
- Robots
- Missiles

The Shi'ar also possess more unique technologies, including:

- Hologram technology: which is used by the X-Men in their Danger Room.
- Cloaking technology: rendering a craft completely invisible, used by the X-Men on their Blackbird aircraft.
- Stargates: Devices in a network system. They are used for travel to faraway distances including instantaneous travel between galaxies. There are planet-based Stargates (used for personal travel to other solar systems and galaxies) and enormous space-based versions (used for starships to travel through).
- Starcracker technology: This is the Shi'ar ultimate weapon. The Starcracker causes stars to go supernova.
- Warp-Capable Warships: Ranging in size from small starships to planetoid sized ships.
- Armageddon-class Killstations: Orbital battle space stations.
- Flying Walker-Spacecraft: Spaceships with walker-like legs used on land.
- Nega-Bomb: A Galactic-level weapon capable of destroying planets and galaxies.
- Fusion Space Mines

According to a statement by Emma Frost in Astonishing X-Men #9, most if not all Shi'ar technology is sentient.

== Culture ==
=== Language ===
A Shi'ar "Galaxian" has stated that they have learned nearly every spoken language.

The Shi'ar language has multiple forms, including High Shi'ar, used for formal events, and Shi'ar Glorkon dialect.

Mostly for tactical terms or insults, the Shi'ar insert words of their language into English sentences.

=== Philosophy ===
Traditionally, the Imperium has aggressively absorbed new cultures. Warren Ellis' 1995 Starjammers miniseries described the story of the Shi'ar deities Sharra and K'ythri as a parable which guides the Shi'ar expansionist philosophy to other worlds:

Sharra and K'ythri are the gods in marriage. The gods who didn't want to marry, but were forced into it. In marriage they found strength and in strength they found love. That's what the Shi'ar Imperium does. It marries other cultures. Shotgun weddings.

There are aggressive and violent ancient traditions, such as the Rite of Arin'nn Haelar, which is a battle to the death. This rite can be invoked to settle disagreements and their outcomes are accepted by the Imperium. Their philosophy also impacts their court, as they do not recognize insanity.

X-Men writer Ed Brubaker compared the Shi'ar to Star Trek's Romulans, saying they are "smart, aggressive, and mean".

=== Politics ===
Though the empire has grown to include hundreds of thousands of different sentient species and worlds, the Shi'ar race controls and governs the empire. Its central base of power is located on the "throneworld" Chandilar, while the Shi'ar homeworld is called Aerie (it is unknown if the planet still exists). The leader of the empire is given the title Majestor (male) or Majestrix (female) and is a hereditary position, occupied by members of the royal family of the Shi'ar. Formerly, the Neramani family represented the royal bloodline.

The Shi'ar empire is one of the most advanced and expansive civilizations in the universe, spanning entire galaxies. It is mainly an economic co-operative, where trade with other galactic powers is its driving force. Not all races have the same rights in the Imperium, as the Shi'ar appear to have a disproportionate influence on its governance.

It is nominally ruled over by a high council, which has representatives from a large majority of the alien races that exist within the Imperium. However, in practice, the head of the council (the Majestor or Majestrix) exercises strong executive control and can institute policy virtually by decree.

The leader of the Shi'ar empire is protected by a personal guard called the Imperial Guard, which is made up of the most powerful and elite soldiers from throughout the Empire with most of them being Shi'ar and others being from other alien races in the Shi'ar's jurisdiction. The Imperial Guard is led by a praetor. The Shi'ar military, outside of the Imperial Guard, consists almost exclusively of Shi'ar personnel.

Though having warlike and militaristic ancestry, the Shi'ar empire has largely occupied the role of peacekeepers in many interstellar affairs. For instance, Empress Lilandra Neramani tried to broker peace between the Kree empire and the Skrull Empire to help bring an end to their devastating war: she sought interstellar accord when deciding how to end the threat of Dark Phoenix, and attempted to avenge the destruction of Tarnax IV, the Skrull throneworld, by Galactus.

== History ==
After leaving their world, the Shi'ar started an intergalactic Empire, conquered other cultures, and ruled for millions of years. Such cultures included the Chameloids, Lupaks, Stygians, Strontians, Hodinn, Saurids and many more. The Shi'ar also conquered the peaceful Mephitisoids, stealing their technology, and erased the truth from history. Another culture the Shi'ar attacked and hid from history was the Threshold, an ancient civilization of mutants who lived on Earth billions of years ago. The ancient Shi'ar were repelled by the Threshold, which damaged their pride.

When the Shi'ar known as Rook'shir bonded to the Phoenix Force, he became the Dark Phoenix and wreaked havoc across the Shi'ar empire. In order to stop him, the first Imperial Guard sent Gladiator after him, who killed him. For years, Rook'shir's descendants were killed out of fear that one of them might host the Phoenix Force like their ancestor. Rook'shir left behind a sword known as the Blade of the Phoenix which contained a small portion of the Phoenix Force's power. The sword could only be lifted by Rook'shir's descendants. Korvus is the only known surviving descendant of Rook'shir.

=== M'Kraan Crystal ===
D'Ken Neramani, a corrupt Shi'ar ruler, attempts to use the M'Kraan Crystal to take over the universe. His younger sister Lilandra and her new allies, the X-Men, foiled his plans. He was rendered comatose by the crystal and Lilandra then took over as the Majestrix of the Shi'ar empire. The X-Men, as well as most of Earth's other superheroes, have had cordial if not friendly relations with the Shi'ar empire since.

=== Trial of Galactus ===
The Shi'ar put Reed Richards on trial for the crimes of genocide. He was guilty of reviving Galactus after he was defeated on Earth. Shortly after his revival, Galactus proceeded to consume the Skrull throneworld, resulting in the death of billions. Uatu the Watcher, acting as his lawyer and with the help of Odin and Galactus himself, convinced the gathered tribunal that Galactus is a necessary force of betterment of the universe and is not a villain. This was done by summoning Eternity. The truth as shown by Eternity however, is so grand and overpowering that none of the tribunal's members can remember it fully, although the comprehension stays.

=== Deathbird and the Kree-Shi'ar War ===
In the 1980s, Lilandra and D'Ken's unstable exiled elder sibling Deathbird made several attempts to overthrow her sister from power. Deathbird even resorted to attacking Lilandra's Earth-based allies to achieve her goals. She is also responsible for initially directing the alien parasites known as the Brood towards the Earth and its heroes. Deathbird was eventually deposed with the assistance of the X-Men.

In the 1992 crossover "Operation: Galactic Storm," the Shi'ar annexed the Kree empire at the end of the Kree-Shi'ar War and Deathbird was placed into a prominent position as viceroy of Hala, the Kree homeworld. However, Deathbird did not last long in this position and has since abandoned her responsibilities and it appears that the Kree empire has, at least in some part, been re-established.

=== Cassandra Nova ===
Professor X's twin sister Cassandra Nova single-handedly destroys a good portion of the Shi'ar empire. Inhabiting the body of her brother, Nova asserts control of Empress Lilandra and causes a Shi'ar civil war. Jean Grey is instrumental in ending this threat.

=== Phoenix Endsong and End of Greys ===
Despite the aid she gave them by eliminating the threat of Cassandra Nova, the Shi'ar still held a grudge against Jean Grey for the destruction she caused as Dark Phoenix. In the Phoenix Endsong series, a group of Shi'ar tried to eliminate both the Phoenix Force and Jean Grey. Jean, however, escaped their suicide bomb attack and returned to the White Hot Room to restore herself.

In the "End of Greys" story arc, the Shi'ar wanted to wipe out the Grey genome and Quentin Quire with the purpose of eliminating the possibility of a new Omega-level mutant becoming a host for the Phoenix Force. The Shi'ar Death Commandos were sent to Jean Grey's childhood home, where a family gathering was massacred, leaving only Rachel Summers alive. It is later implied that the Shi'ar Council was responsible for this, and that Lilandra is unaware of what has been done in her name.

=== Fall of the Shi'ar ===
Due to D'Ken's enslavement of him and the murder of his mother, the mutant known as Vulcan attacks the Empire. Meanwhile, there is a coup to dethrone Lilandra and return D'Ken to power, with the aid of Deathbird. The X-Men, joined by the Starjammers, attempt to stop both Vulcan and the plot to return rulership of the empire to D'Ken. In the end, Vulcan kills his father, Corsair, and D'Ken, and assumes the throne of the Shi'ar empire for himself, with Deathbird as his queen. Lilandra and the Starjammers begin a resistance against Vulcan's rule.

=== Emperor Vulcan ===
The civil war between Vulcan's forces and those loyal to the dethroned Lilandra rages on. Led by Havok and the Starjammers, Lilandra's forces gradually whittle away at Vulcan's forces, which are plagued by defections. The Shi'ar, contrary to Vulcan's expectations, are not happy to have an outsider as their ruler. Vulcan is discouraged by this, but Deathbird convinces him that they will come to accept him.

Warned in advance of a rebel raid, Vulcan and his fleet ambush the Starjammers. However, in the middle of the battle, Vulcan's ship is destroyed by the Scy'ar Tal (translates as "Death to the Shi'ar"). Vulcan and Gladiator attack the leader of the Scy'ar Tal and are easily defeated, whereupon they retreat deeper into Shi'ar space.

Marvel Girl makes contact with the Eldest Scy'ar Tal and discovers their true origin. The Scy'ar Tal were originally called the M'Kraan. Early in their history, the Shi'ar attacked them, killed a great number of their people, making the rest flee. Eventually, the Shi'ar settled on their planet, took the M'Kraan Crystal as their own, and passed down the legend of the M'Kraan Crystal as a sacred gift from their deities, Sharra and K'ythri. The M'Kraan then changed their name to Scy'ar Tal and devoted their culture and society to the destruction of the Shi'ar empire. Vulcan makes contact with the Starjammers to call a temporary ceasefire. Under the ceasefire, the Shi'ar and the Starjammers decide to take out the Finality, thus crippling the Scy'ar's biggest threat.

=== X-Men: Kingbreaker ===
Vulcan and the Shi'ar were featured prominently in the mini-series X-Men: Kingbreaker that revolved around Vulcan and the Starjammers following the conclusion of the mini-series Emperor Vulcan. This mini-series led to the War of Kings event.

=== War of Kings ===
The "War of Kings" storyline revolves around the Starjammers, the Shi'ar, the Inhumans, the Kree, the Guardians of the Galaxy, and the Nova Corps. The Shi'ar end up in conflict with the Inhumans and the Kree. After Lilandra is killed by Darkhawk, Gladiator assumes the throne and surrenders to the Inhumans and the Kree.

=== Time Runs Out ===
When the Shi'ar found out that the reason for the decay of the universe was on Earth, they decided to destroy the planet. However, the Guardians of the Galaxy managed to warn the Avengers about the attack.

When approaching Earth, the Shi'ar alerted humanity about their destruction of Earth. However Sunspot and A.I.M. used a super weapon to retaliate against the Shi'ar, while S.H.I.E.L.D.'s Avengers used a Planetkiller to attack from behind. However, A.I.M.'s weapon exploded due to overheat, and the Planetkiller was destroyed by the Annihilation Wave. The Avengers were ready to meet their end, but the Illuminati intervened used the controller disk of a rogue planet that shared the same space with Earth, while Iron Man flew to the Sol's Hammer, and used it, successfully destroying the Shi'ar fleet, including the Imperial Guards.

=== All-New, All-Different Marvel ===
==== Asgard/Shi'ar War ====
During "The Asgard/Shi'ar War" storyline, the Shi'ar gods Sharra and K'ythri initiate a "Challenge of the Gods" by bringing the Shi'ar fleet to Asgard while threatening Earth with their Super Destroyers. Sharra and K'ythri use their power to cause a tidal wave in order to ferment greater worship in the survivors. Thor impedes their efforts by saving lives instead of claiming them, the round going to her as the survivors are thankful for her mercy. Having had enough of the murderous spectacles, Thor challenges Sharra and K'ythri directly, turning the Challenge of the Gods in her favor. Sharra and K'ythri are imprisoned in Omnipotence City for their actions.

==== Mr. & Mrs. X ====
Though largely prosperous for a time the Shi'ar still suffer have occasional strife brought upon by the treacherous Deathbird. She and her rebel faction stand against the empire on the grounds that Kallark, head of the Imperial Guard and current Majestor of the Shi'ar, is not a true Shi'ar and thus believe his rule to be illegitimate. To actualize their claim, the insurgents are in hot pursuit of an item pertaining critical importance to the Shi'ar Imperium, a glowing egg contain the next successor to monarchy and the throne. In truth, the shell was a telepathic mirage thrown up by its true contents, the prize in actuality being Xandra Neramani, the genetically engineered daughter of Professor X and Lilandra Neramani. Xandra goes on to assume the throne of the Shi'ar empire.

== Notable Shi'ar ==
The following are members of the Shi'ar:

- Adam Neramani – A Shi'ar/human hybrid, the genetically engineered son of former Emperor D'Ken.
- Araki – One of the Lords Chamberlain who informed the Majestix Lilandra of the Shi'ar's victory over the Kree.
- Ava'Dara Naganandini – A member of the Shi'ar Warbirds.
- Black Light – A member of the Imperial Guards and twin brother of White Noise.
- Cerise – Member of The Graces.
- Davis Cameron – A Human Mutant and Shi'ar hybrid.
- D'Ken – The former Majestor of the Shi'ar and the brother of Lilandra and Deathbird.
- Deathbird – The sister of Lilandra Neramani and D'Ken.
- Deathcry – A Shi'ar commando who is the niece of Lilandra.
- Electron – A Shi'ar who is a member of the Imperial Guard.
- Erik the Red – A Shi'ar spy who is a member of the Shi'ar Imperial Agency.
- Heather Cameron – A Human mutant and Shi'ar hybrid.
- Korvus – Wielder of The Blade of the Phoenix.
- K'ythri – One of the two chief deities of the Shi'ar. Husband of Sharra.
- Lilandra Neramani – The former Majestrix of the Shi'ar and the sister of D'Ken and Deathbird.
- Magique – The name of two Shi'ar who are members of the Imperial Guard.
- Oracle– A long-time member and warrior serving in the Royal Elite of the Shi'ar Imperial Guard.
- Rook'shir – A Shi'ar who is the ancestor of Korvus and one of the hosts of the Phoenix Force.
- Sharra – One of the two chief deities of the Shi'ar. Wife of K'ythri.
- White Noise – A member of the Imperial Guards and twin sister of Black Light.
- Xandra Neramani – The genetically engineered daughter of Lilandra and Charles Xavier. Xandra is a Shi'ar/human hybrid and current Majestrix of the Shi'ar empire.

== Other versions ==
=== Ultimate Marvel ===
In the Ultimate Marvel universe, the Shi'ar are a religious group whose beliefs are said to have descended from alien knowledge. They worship the Phoenix, believing it to be a god of not only destruction, but renewal. Their beliefs state that all of the Earth was originally a prison created by ancient alien civilizations to hold the Phoenix, but its presence at the core led to the creation of life on Earth, and the Phoenix's direct influence resulted in all major steps of evolution for man, and specifically, led to the creation of mutants. The Hellfire Club is an offshoot of the Shi'ar religion that believes the Phoenix only desires destruction.

An alternate version of Lilandra Neramani is later introduced as the human Majestrix of the Church of Shi'ar Enlightenment. She contacts Professor Xavier with the offer of funding his school's immense budget, in exchange for the chance to see if Jean Grey is the human host for The Phoenix.

=== Age of Apocalypse ===
In the Age of Apocalypse reality, the Shi'ar Empire was almost decimated by the Brood. However, D'Ken remains as Majestor of the Imperium, while Lilandra has been executed and Deathbird leads the Starjammers.

=== MC2 ===
In Last Planet Standing, a limited series set in the alternate timeline known as MC2, the Shi'ar homeworld is destroyed by Galactus.

=== Marvel Zombies ===
In Marvel Zombies Return, led by Luke Cage of another reality, the Shi'ar were defeated and killed by the zombified heroes of the Earth.

== In other media ==
=== Television ===
- The Shi'ar appear in X-Men: The Animated Series.
- The Shi'ar appear in X-Men '97.

=== Video games ===
- The Shi'ar appear in X-Men (1993).
- The Shi'ar appear in Marvel: Ultimate Alliance.
