= From the Ashes =

From the ashes is a metaphor related to the mythological phoenix.

From the Ashes may also refer to:

== Books and comics ==
- "From the Ashes" (comics), a 1983 storyline in the Uncanny X-Men comic book by Marvel Comics
- From the Ashes (Dungeons & Dragons), a 1992 supplement for the World of Greyhawk campaign setting in Dungeons & Dragons
- From the Ashes: Making Sense of Waco, 1994 book edited by James R. Lewis about the 1993 Waco siege
- From the Ashes (memoir), a 2019 memoir by Jesse Thistle
- X-Men: From the Ashes, the 2024 relaunch of the X-Men line of comic books published by Marvel Comics

== Music ==
- "From the Ashes", a song by Mike Oldfield featured on the 1999 album Guitars
- From the Ashes (album), a 2003 album by Pennywise
- "From the Ashes", a song by Borealis from the 2015 album Purgatory

== Film and television ==
- From the Ashes: Nicaragua Today, a 1982 documentary film
- From the Ashes: The Life and Times of Tick Hall, a 2003 documentary film
- "From the Ashes" (Agents of S.H.I.E.L.D.), a 2019 episode of Agents of S.H.I.E.L.D.
- From the Ashes (2024 film), a 2024 Saudi Arabian thriller

== See also ==
- Out of the Ashes (disambiguation)
- Up from the Ashes (disambiguation)
