= Madelyne Pryor =

Comic book character

Madelyne Jennifer Pryor
- Madelyne Pryor as the Goblin Queen on a variant cover of New Mutants (vol. 4) #25 (May 2022); Art by Miguel Mercado

Publication information
- Publisher: Marvel Comics
- First appearance: Uncanny X-Men #168 (April 1983)
- Created by: Chris Claremont; Paul Smith

In-story information
- Full name: Madelyne Jennifer Pryor
- Species: Human mutant (clone)
- Team affiliations: X-Men; Hellfire Club; Sisterhood of Mutants; Dark X-Men; Masters of Evil
- Notable aliases: Madelyne Pryor-Summers; Anodyne; Goblin Queen; Black Rook; Red Queen; Queen of Limbo
- Abilities: Telekinesis: Psychic energy blast; Psychic siphoning; Force-field projection; Teleportation; Reality warping; Telepathy: Telepathic camouflage; Telepathic illusions; Memory alteration; Telepathic shield; Astral projection; Mental paralysis; Mind link; Sorcery: Evocation; Regeneration

Madelyne Jennifer Pryor is a supervillain appearing in American comic books published by Marvel Comics. Created by writer Chris Claremont and artist Paul Smith, the character first appeared in Uncanny X-Men #168 (April 1983). Primarily a featured character of the X-Men, Madelyne Pryor is the ex-love-interest and first wife of Cyclops, a clone of Jean Grey, and the mother of Cable. She was a long-standing member of the X-Men supporting cast until a series of traumas eventually led to her being manipulated into being an antagonist.

Jennifer Hale voices Madelyne Pryor in X-Men '97 (2024-present), the sequel series to X-Men: The Animated Series (1992-1997).

== Publication history ==
Madelyne Pryor was introduced during the acclaimed 1983 Uncanny X-Men run (retroactively in 1990 titled "From the Ashes") that saw long-time writer Chris Claremont pair with artist Paul Smith for a series of issues that would see the look-alike of Jean Grey marry the retired X-Men leader Cyclops (Scott Summers). She first appeared in Uncanny X-Men #168 (April 1983). Multiple retcons in her publication history and that of Jean have particularly complicated her biography.

Madelyne's hairstyle design was modeled on that of Louise Simonson, the book's editor (at the time) then known as Louise Jones—a design retained on the character until 1988. Claremont named the character after Steeleye Span singer Maddy Prior. Claremont had already created a character named "Maddy Pryor", a little girl who appeared briefly in Avengers Annual #10 (1981), and has no in-story connections to the X-Men character. Claremont, nonetheless, years later took an opportunity to indulge in an in-joke: in Uncanny X-Men #238 (1988), a similar child would appear as Madelyne's mental image of herself, wearing the same clothes as the little girl from The Avengers Annual #10, repeating the girl's same line of dialogue, but also singing "Gone to America", one of Steeleye Span's biggest hits.

According to Claremont, the original link between Madelyne and Jean was entirely the product of Mastermind's powers of illusion. Seeking revenge against the X-Men, Mastermind deceived the X-Men that Madelyne is the Phoenix in an attempt to have the team kill her to demoralize them. Mastermind's plan fails, and Madelyne and Cyclops are married shortly after. Claremont had conceived Madelyne as a device to write Cyclops out of the X-Men and have him retire "happily ever after" with Madelyne and their child.

The story became more complicated in 1986 when moves by the editors and other writers to reunite the original X-Men, for the new title X-Factor, resulted in Jean's resurrection and Scott leaving his wife and son. This deeply compromised Cyclops's character and left little room for Madelyne, and Cyclops's actions then—and towards even Jean years later—have been controversial ever since. Marvel attempted to resolve these problems in the 1989 Inferno crossover (co-scripted by Simonson with Claremont), in which Madelyne is retconned to be a clone of Jean created by Mister Sinister to produce a child with Cyclops, and corrupted by her anger and demonic influence as the Goblin Queen, leading to her elimination and into an object of damnatio memoriae (and "nonperson" status) for several years.

Asked about his intended plans for Madelyne's character, Claremont said:

The original Madelyne storyline was that, at its simplest level, she was that one in a million shot that just happened to look like Jean Grey [a.k.a. the first Phoenix]! And the relationship was summed up by the moment when Scott says: "Are you Jean?" And she punches him! That was in Uncanny X-Men #174. Because her whole desire was to be deeply loved for herself not to be loved as the evocation of her boyfriend's dead romantic lover and sweetheart.

I mean, it's a classical theme. You can go back to a whole host of 1930s films, 1940s, Hitchcock films—but it all got invalidated by the resurrection of Jean Grey in X-Factor #1. The original plotline was that Scott marries Madelyne, they have their child, they go off to Alaska, he goes to work for his grandparents, he retires from the X-Men. He's a reserve member. He's available for emergencies. He comes back on special occasions, for special fights, but he has a life. He has grown up. He has grown out of the monastery; he is in the real world now. He has a child. He has maybe more than one child. It's a metaphor for us all. We all grow up. We all move on.

Scott was going to move on. Jean was dead get on with your life. And it was close to a happy ending. They lived happily ever after, and it was to create the impression that maybe if you came back in ten years, other X-Men would have grown up and out, too. Would Kitty stay with the team forever? Would Nightcrawler? Would any of them? Because that way we could evolve them into new directions, we could bring in new characters. There would be an ongoing sense of renewal, and growth and change in a positive sense.

Then, unfortunately, Jean was resurrected, Scott dumps his wife and kid and goes back to the old girlfriend. So it not only destroys Scott's character as a hero and as a decent human being it creates an untenable structural situation: what do we do with Madelyne and the kid? ... So ultimately the resolution was: turn her into the Goblin Queen and kill her off.

The character was brought back in 1995 as a supporting character in X-Man, a marginal X-Men related title. Though by 2001 and along with the cancellation of the X-Man title, this became a false start at reviving the character, as Pryor would again cease being featured in any Marvel titles, except when Chris Claremont included the character in his non-canon limited series, X-Men: The End (2004–2006).

In 2008, the 25th anniversary of the character's debut in Uncanny X-Men, the character was brought back in the flagship X-Men title for the first time since the 1989 Inferno storyline. But the following year and the 20th anniversary since Inferno, she was removed completely again, and would not be featured in another story until 2014—25 years since Inferno—in a single issue of the secondary title, X-Men (vol. 4), and was also included in a flashback story by Claremont included in a 2014 X-Men 50th-anniversary one-shot titled X-Men: Gold (unrelated to a 2017 monthly also titled X-Men Gold).

Pryor was again absent for an extended time until featured in another flashback story also by Claremont, included in the one-shot X-Men: The Exterminated in 2018 – 35 years since her debut. She was subsequently brought back as a recurring character, first in Hellions from 2020 to 2022, and then New Mutants in 2022. Immediately following this, Pryor was featured as a main character in the crossover storyline Dark Web, a combined sequel to both Inferno and a recent Spider-Man storyline, Beyond. Released from 2022 to the following year, its 2023 conclusion—the 40th anniversary of the debut of Madelyne Pryor—featured the character granted the most significant change and elevation to her status quo by Marvel since 1989.

== Fictional character biography ==
Madelyne Pryor's first appearance in Uncanny X-Men #168. Art by Paul Smith.

=== Whirlwind romance ===
Madelyne Pryor was a cargo pilot in Anchorage, Alaska working for Scott Summers's grandparents when she and Scott meet during a Summers family reunion. A romantic relationship quickly begins between them, however, Scott is disturbed at her striking resemblance to Jean Grey. Also, she was the sole survivor of an airplane crash that occurred the same day Jean died on the moon. In addition, Professor X is unable to telepathically scan her mind, noting it as a rare immunity that exists even in some human brains. Scott, still recovering from Jean's death, becomes obsessed with the idea that Madelyne is Jean's reincarnation, eventually confronting her with these suspicions. Madelyne, furious and hurt, punches Scott and runs from him. As soon as she is alone, she is abducted by Mastermind who had been manipulating the X-Men for months as revenge by having Madelyne appear as the Phoenix. Storm summons a violent storm which defeats Mastermind and nearly kills Madelyne, but Scott resuscitates her. After the conflict, Scott comes to terms with the fact that Jean is dead and that Madelyne is someone else, and that Scott loves her all the same. The two are married, and Scott retires from active duty with the X-Men.

=== Anodyne ===
Scott giving up the life of an adventurer for Madelyne proves harder than imagined. Early in Madelyne and Scott's marriage, they (along with Alpha Flight and the rest of the X-Men) are taken to an abandoned city by Loki. Entirely for his own purposes, Loki bestows mystical powers on a small group of non-powered humans, including Madelyne, giving her the ability to heal virtually any injury, illness, psychological issue, or physical defect. She adopts the name Anodyne and cures Scott's childhood head injury, enabling him to control his optic blasts without the use of ruby-quartz lenses. She also removes Aurora's dissociative identity disorder and Wolverine's berserker rage. When it is discovered that Loki's gifts are extremely flawed and fatal to some, everyone assembled rejects the gift. Madelyne and the other beneficiaries are reverted to the original states, as are all those who had been healed by Madelyne. During this adventure, Madelyne reveals that she is pregnant.

=== Abandonment ===
Going into premature labor, Madelyne gives birth to Nathan Summers alone in the X-Mansion. Sensing a reluctance on Scott's part to retire to family life, the powerless Storm challenges Scott to a duel for leadership of the team, which Storm wins. This in effect forces Scott to accept his role as a husband and father.

Although Scott tries to live a normal family life in Alaska, he often thinks of Jean and of life with the X-Men. Maddie tries her best to make Scott happy, but her efforts seem wasted. Finally Scott receives a call from former teammate Angel that Jean has been found alive. Without explanation, Scott abandons Madelyne and Nathan to reunite with Jean, and forms X-Factor with old friends from the original X-Men. Madelyne and Nathan are then attacked by the Marauders; Nathan is kidnapped and Madelyne left for dead, but survives and is hospitalized as a "Jane Doe". The guilt-wracked and increasingly unstable Scott returned home to find the house empty, and all records of Madelyne's and Nathan's existence erased.

Alone and threatened, Madelyne calls the X-Men for help and fight off another attack by the Marauders. Despairing from Scott's absence and of Nathan's fate, she contemplates suicide. Havok (Alex Summers) talks her out of it, and the two of them grow closer. With the Marauders still after her, she stays with the X-Men, and the group sacrifice their lives to stop the Adversary from remaking the world in Fall of the Mutants. A reporter video-interviews them before their death, and Maddie uses this to deliver a message to Scott, pleading that Scott find their child. With the world thinking the X-Men dead, Madelyne and the X-Men are resurrected by the Omniversal Guardian Roma and begin working secretly out of the Reavers' abandoned base in Australia. Madelyne serves as the team's technical support.

=== Demonic corruption and origins revealed ===
Monitoring news transmissions, Madelyne learns that Jean is alive and with Scott. She punches the computer monitor's screen, breaking it and causing electrical feedback that renders her unconscious. The Limbo demon S'ym invades Madelyne's mind during her unconscious state and puts her through a traumatic Nightmare Sequence, until she runs into S'ym offering her a deal to become more than she had been and shows her images of a girl, a pilot, a woman, and a demon, which reflects what she was, is, and what she dreams to become. Thinking this all is just a dream, Madelyne chooses the demon, whereupon S'ym stabs her with a finger. She falls unconscious, dressed in a cropped black leather shirt, leather loincloth, and thigh-high Combat Stiletto boots, thus reflecting her eventual change into the Goblin Queen.

Afterwards, she keeps the existence of the original X-Men as X-Factor secret from the others, filtering only information and news showing X-Factor as an anti-mutant group. Later abducted by the Genoshans and taken to the island-nation, Madelyne is subjected to psychic torture intended to transform her into a docile slave of the state. Madelyne instinctively lashes out with her developing abilities, and thus causes the deaths of her torturers. In the recorded images of the psychic probe performed on Madelyne, a connection is made to the Phoenix Force, and her attire reflects again her eventual change into the Goblin Queen. Shortly after being rescued by the X-Men, Madelyne strikes a bargain with N'astirh to find the Marauders and return Nathan to her. During this time, she and Alex become lovers.

Madelyne Pryor as the Goblin Queen. Art by Marc Silvestri.

To keep the end of their bargain, N'astirh takes Madelyne to the orphanage in Nebraska where Scott had grown up, actually a front for Mister Sinister's genetic laboratory. Sinister appears and tells Madelyne about her origins. When Jean Grey first started training with Xavier, Sinister learned about her and created a clone of Jean. However, the clone had no consciousness and failed to develop any mutant powers, so Sinister left the clone in her incubation tube as a failed experiment. Years later, a part of the Phoenix Force entered and awakened the clone and gave her sentience, renewing Sinister's interest. Sinister then conceived a plan to use the clone to facilitate selective breeding between her and Scott; named her as a pun on her prior existence, implanted memories and a personality designed to attract Scott, created a false background, and planted her with Scott's grandparents' company, which ensured the two would eventually meet. Jean's return threatened to cause the truth about Madelyne to be uncovered if the two were to meet, so Sinister tasked the Marauders with killing Madelyne and bringing Nathan, the fruit of Sinister's scheme.

Broken in spirit and reduced to insanity by these revelations, when N'astirh gives Nathan back to her, Madelyne willingly decides to aid the demon in the "Inferno" invasion of Earth. Returning to New York City during the invasion, she confronts X-Factor. When the X-Men arrive, Madelyne manipulates the teams against each other at first, and convinces Alex to join her. X-Factor and the other X-Men work together to defeat N'astirh. Madelyne refuses to stop, forcing the heroes to overwhelm her. Cyclops is unable to act because most of her accusations are true. Cyclops rescues Nathan, but Madelyne commits suicide in an attempt to telepathically take Jean with her. The Phoenix Force appears to Jean and offers to save her, but in order to survive Jean has to integrate the essence of both the Phoenix and Madelyne, gaining their memories and personalities. Mister Sinister attempts to entrap all of the X-Men and X-Factor in Madelyne's dying mind, but forced to choose between having revenge either on the X-Men or Sinister, Madelyne ejects Sinister from her mind. With her personality influencing Jean's, she then prompts the X-Men and X-Factor to attempt lethal retribution against Sinister.

Jean, having inherited Madelyne's maternal feelings for Nathan, becomes a proxy mother until Apocalypse infected Nathan with a techno-organic virus, resulting in the child taken 2,000 years into the future by Askani to be saved.

=== Reappearance ===
Years later, Madelyne mysteriously reappears as an amnesiac to Nate Grey (X-Man), the genetically-engineered "offspring" of the Cyclops and Jean Grey from the alternate reality known as the Age of Apocalypse, after he arrives into Earth-616. Coming under the tutelage of Selene, Madelyne eventually becomes the Black Rook of the Hellfire Club as well as Sebastian Shaw's mistress, has her memories of her previous life restored by Tessa, and meets Cable in an uneasy truce.

While searching for Nate, she encounters Threnody who reveals to her that even though Madelyne is walking around and breathing, she is actually still dead. Angered, she murders Threnody. She then finds Nate with Jean and a fight ensues. Nate chooses to side with Jean over her. Then it is revealed that Madelyne is actually a "psionic construct" inadvertently resurrected by a combination of Nate's psionic powers and desperate need for a mother figure upon arriving on Earth-616.

Antagonistic for a time after this revelation, Madelyne later walks away from the Hellfire Club and resumes accompanying Nate. An attack against them seriously weakens Maddie and forces her to depart from him again.

=== Red Queen ===
Soon after, Nate is accompanied again by Madelyne, but she is actually the Red Queen, a version of Jean Grey from the alternate reality Earth-9575. The exact details of how she had replaced Madelyne are left unrevealed. Pryor is later found trapped within the astral plane, unable to leave.

Some years later the X-Men investigate an anti-mutant group called the "Hellfire Cult", led by Empath who is secretly being controlled and taking orders from a mysterious woman using the name Red Queen, who is particularly interested in learning about Scott's current paramour, Emma Frost. The X-Men take down the Cult and capture Empath, but the Red Queen slips away unseen. She then psionically impersonates Frost and has virtual sex with Scott, without him realizing the deception. Afterward the Red Queen travels to Madripoor where she recruits Chimera into a new group called the "Sisterhood of Mutants", and her identity revealed to be Madelyne.

With Martinique Jason (recruited before the Cult's exposure) and Chimera accompanying her, Madelyne recruits Spiral and Lady Deathstrike into the Sisterhood as well. Madelyne then recruits Martinique's half-sister, Lady Mastermind, who accepts membership upon Madelyne's peculiar (and ironic) promise to bring back the half-sisters' late father, the original Mastermind. Carrying out Madelyne's orders, the Sisterhood retrieves the corpse of Revanche and performs an elaborate set of procedures on Revanche and the captured Psylocke, fully restoring the body and transferring Psylocke's mind into it. Madelyne's true priority was to restore herself back into flesh and blood. In the time since the encounter in the astral plane, Pryor had eventually managed to manifest back in the physical world as an intangible entity of psionic energy. The experiment on Psylocke served as a test run for Pryor.

The Sisterhood commences a surprise raid on the X-Men's base, quickly neutralizing several of the main X-members. Recovering from the initial attacks, the X-Men force the Sisterhood (now including the brainwashed Psylocke) to retreat. But the battle was only a distraction, as the real purpose was for Madelyne to locate Jean's gravesite. Madelyne's own body had been cremated after her suicide, so Jean's seemed the only option available to her. At Jean's grave, Madelyne attempts to repeat the ritual with her corpse, which fails.

=== Avengers Vs. X-Men ===
During the 2012 Avengers vs. X-Men storyline, Mister Sinister creates a group of six clones of Madelyne Pryor in order to take the Phoenix Force energies from Cyclops, Colossus, Emma Frost, Magik, and Namor. Unlike the original Madelyne, none of the six clones possess individual personalities or free will, but instead appear to follow Sinister completely. The clones join Sinister's other clone creations in fighting the Phoenix Five, and manage to defeat each one. They are also able to siphon some of the energy from the Phoenix Force, but are all immediately killed by the entity itself.

=== Lady Deathstrike's Sisterhood ===
Lady Deathstrike, whose consciousness had taken possession of Colombian girl Ana Cortes, formed an all-new Sisterhood initially comprising the latter, Typhoid Mary, and the Enchantress. The sentient bacteria Arkea possesses Lady Deathstrike's assistant Reiko and joins. As Arkea fears being opposed by the X-Men, she wants powerhouses with the Sisterhood, so she has Enchantress use her magicks to restore Selene and makes plans to resurrect Madelyne. Cortes manages to turn against Deathstrike, contact the X-Men and alert the group of the Sisterhood's location, and then commit suicide in an attempt to foil Arkea's plans. Arkea is able to place Deathstrike's consciousness into Reiko, and seeing an opportunity, splices Jean's DNA to Ana's body, making it a fully compatible host for Madelyne. The Enchantress then uses her magicks to retrieve Madelyne's consciousness and place it into the body, reviving Madelyne (and seemingly reshaping Cortes's physical appearance into Madelyne's), and making her flesh-and-blood again for the first time since her own suicide. When the X-Men arrive and attack, Madelyne fights and telepathically defeats the more experienced telepath Rachel Grey. Storm offers Madelyne and Selene a deal, essentially letting them go free, as the X-Men are only after Arkea at the moment. As Madelyne and the other members of the Sisterhood do not particularly care for Arkea, they desert her, allowing all of the Arkea bacteria to be destroyed. Accompanied by Selene, Madelyne declares that she would create an all new Sisterhood.

=== Krakoan Age ===
==== Hellions ====
When Mister Sinister sent the second Hellions team of mutants to destroy the abandoned cloning farm hidden under the old Nebraska orphanage, they are surprised to find Madelyne there. In her Goblin Queen attire, Madelyne had captured and tortured Sinister's former team of killers, the Marauders, and turned them into zombie-like creatures. Madelyne commands the zombified Marauders to attack the Hellions, but captures and takes Havok prisoner, deciding to reunite with her former lover, and silences him by removing his mouth. She reveals her anger that no one cared about her return and then her seeming exclusion from Krakoa, and so plans to unleash an army of cloned Marauder zombies to attack the mutant island just to be noticed and prove her existence. Havok cuts open his mouth to speak, and impresses her by admitting that he had genuine feelings for Madelyne all along back when she and Scott were together. The Hellions thwart her plans by killing all the zombies, and Madelyne is fatally shot by John Greycrow as well. As she dies, Madelyne heals Alex's injured face and tells him that she only wanted to be acknowledged and remembered. When the team returns to Krakoa, Cyclops tells Havok that while the Quiet Council decided to approve resurrection of the original Marauders, they decided not to resurrect Madelyne on the grounds that she was a clone. The decision infuriates and devastates Havok; unbeknownst to him, the Council had not been able to decide whether Madelyne was a clone or her own person, so her resurrection remains undecided. Eventually the approval is made and Madelyne resurrected on Krakoa.

==== The Labors of Magik ====
Immediately afterwards, Madelyne—back in her Goblin Queen attire—is approached by Illyana Rasputin with a proposal. Wanting to transcend her traumatic past by distancing herself from Limbo, but needing to find a new ruler for the demonic dimension, Magik—over the objections of her fellow New Mutants—offers handing over rulership of the realm to Pryor. Illyana regards Madelyne as suitable to take over due to Pryor's past connection to Limbo and because, like Magik, she too has survived painfully traumatic experiences and is still a damaged soul, as Illyana declares anyone normal and "untouched by darkness" to be ill-suited to rule Limbo. Seeing Limbo as a second chance for herself and the means to cut any ties with Krakoa and all the people (i.e. Mister Sinister, Cyclops, Jean, even Havok) who she resents for always defining her entire existence, Madelyne accepts Illyana's offer. Though only after the pair and their group found themselves forced to journey and fight together against foes trying to destroy Magik and seize her power, does the handover happen. With Rasputin's rulership of Limbo relinquished, Madelyne—attired in a new outfit—is now Queen of Limbo.

==== Dark Web ====
Some time after, Ben Reilly, a wayward and now-vengeful clone of Peter Parker now known as Chasm, feels himself being drawn to and enters Limbo and encounters Madelyne. Feeling they have much in common as victimized and outcast clones who both believed their mutual progenitors had destroyed their lives, Madelyne and Ben form an alliance and plan to strike back. As a demonstration of their teamwork, Madelyne has a demon possess a mailbox and attack Spider-Man while she and Ben watch from afar. Madelyne later finds Eddie Brock (Venom) wandering in Limbo as he seeks a way back to Earth and convinces him that participating with her and Chasm will be mutually beneficial. Reilly's girlfriend Janine Godbe requests that she be provided the means to participate alongside Ben. As Janine has also been a mistreated and victimized woman for most of her life, Madelyne sympathizes with Janine and gives her magical abilities, resulting in her becoming the supervillain Hallows' Eve.

Brock grows impatient and uncooperative with Pryor and Chasm, leading to them regressing Brock's mind back into the primitive and savage Venom of the past. Madelyne unleashes her demons into Manhattan, which Spider-Man and the X-Men battle against, while Chasm strikes at some of Peter's friends. Though the rampaging demons are just a distraction to scatter and occupy the X-Men away from their Manhattan base, at which Venom is sent to attack as an added decoy to enable Hallows' Eve to raid the base and steal a device for Madelyne. When Magik, Jean, Havok, and Cyclops enter Limbo to confront Madelyne, they're taken prisoner. Jean eventually breaks free and battles Madelyne, until Jean discovers that Maddie's plotting was all just to possess Jean's memories and experiences from the very brief time she was proxy mother to Nathan, the son that Maddie lost to Jean. Jean voluntarily shares all the memories with Madelyne, also revealing that she had advocated from the start that Maddie be granted a Krakoan resurrection, finally seeming to mend her last unhealed emotional wounds and making peace between them.

Madelyne tries to end what she started and approaches Chasm and Hallows' Eve with this. Having not succeeded in gaining what he wanted from his vendetta on Parker, both Chasm and Eve take Maddie's abandoning of their plotting as a betrayal and usurp Madelyne's power as ruler of Limbo. Chasm teleports a massive tower into Manhattan and launches a massive demonic invasion. Madelyne then joins with the heroes to stop him.

Madelyne reasserts her rulership over the demons as the Goblin Queen of Limbo and Chasm defeated. In the aftermath, the tower remains in place as an "Embassy of Limbo", and Madelyne seems to continue to be an ally of the X-Men and Spider-Man. She and Alex also rekindle their romantic relationship.

==== Dark X-Men (2023) ====
After the Hellfire Gala is attacked by Orchis, Madelyne establishes her version of the Dark X-Men with Havok to oppose Orchis.

=== Post-Krakoa ===
Soon after the end of the Krakoan Age, Madelyne and Alex part ways again.

After Doctor Doom has made himself the emperor of the world, Carol Danvers invites the Goblin Queen to join with an alliance the Avengers are forming with the Masters of Evil in resisting against Doom. Concurrently, Magik helps Pryor put down a potential rebellion from Limbo's demons. Following Doom's defeat and the Scarlet Witch assuming the mantle of Sorcerer Supreme, those against Wanda Maximoff's ascension recruit Madelyne to oppose her. Madelyne is outmatched against Wanda and forced to concede defeat, but retains control of Limbo.

== Powers and abilities ==
As a clone of Jean Grey, Madelyne Pryor possesses mutant abilities of telepathy and telekinesis. These powers were completely dormant while she was believed to be a baseline human, but later manifested in ways that Jean's abilities never had.

During her brief time as Anodyne when she was still believed to be a human, Madelyne was endowed with Asgardian magic that manifested as eldritch flames which granted her the power to heal and cure. Among her beneficial actions were fixing the childhood brain injury that prevented proper control behind Cyclops's optic blasts, curing Puck's mystically induced dwarfism, unifying Aurora's multiple personalities, and giving the ability of control for Rogue's mutant power. Madelyne also seemed to gain the physical stature of an Asgardian.

As the Goblin Queen, Madelyne's long-dormant mutant powers were activated with demonic eldritch magic and exponentially enhanced to the point where she could warp reality, equivalent to Proteus's abilities, within a localized area, possibly over an entire city as demonstrated during Inferno.

After her apparent resurrection as a non-physical entity of psionic energy (similar to the Shadow King) by Nate Grey, Madelyne regained her natural mutant abilities albeit without the demonic enhancements, though her powers are still considerable. Her telepathy enables her to read minds, broadcast her thoughts, create illusions, change or erase memories, and defend herself against other telepaths. With her telekinesis, Madelyne can lift and manipulate large objects, levitate, fire powerful mental force-blasts, form protective shields, and rearrange small objects on a molecular level. Madelyne also utilizes her powers to augment her physical strength and agility, making her formidable in hand-to-hand combat. Madelyne also learned how to use her powers to teleport over long distances by psychokinetically shifting in and out of the astral plane, and was shown to be able to carry along at least one other person with her when teleporting, and was also able to channel psionic energies from other psionic-powered mutants to boost her own abilities or those of another (usually Nate and Cable). It is speculated that Selene's tutelage made these added abilities possible. Since being restored back into a flesh-and-blood physical human-being, Madelyne seems not to have the teleporting and psionic-energy channeling abilities anymore, and so then uses Limbo's magic to teleport.

As the Red Queen, Madelyne additionally demonstrated other abilities of a mysterious nature which she referred to as "magic", which were probably related to the eldritch magics she had previously wielded.

To prepare Madelyne to rule Limbo as its next queen Illyana Rasputin had been teaching her other magics. By channeling her emotional pain and regret, Madelyne created a mystical scythe weapon called both the "Scythe of Sorrows" and the "Soul-Scythe", and uses it as a symbol to command Limbo's demons and as a medium to focus Limbo's magic. Illyana also handed Limbo's huge library of eldritch texts over to Pryor, which she consults as needed.

== Reception ==
=== Critical reception ===
David Harth of Comic Book Resources (CBR) called Madelyne Pryor one of Marvel's "coolest X-Men villains", writing, "Pryor can't catch a break, which is part of what makes her interesting. She's easy to empathize with for readers, as she is definitely a character readers can feel sorry for and even root for to an extent. Her motivations make her a believable villain, and as a clone of Jean Grey, she wields a jaw-dropping amount of power."

=== Accolades ===
- In 2014, Entertainment Weekly ranked Madelyne Pryor 30th in their "Let's rank every X-Man ever" list.
- In 2020, CBR.com ranked Madelyne Pryor 1st in their "X-Men: 10 Most Powerful Members of the Sisterhood of Mutants" list.
- In 2022, Digital Trends ranked Madelyne Pryor 6th in their "10 most powerful X-Men villains" list.
- In 2022, Screen Rant included Madelyne Pryor in their "10 Best X-Men Characters Created By Chris Claremont" list and "10 New Characters We Can Hope To See In X-Men ’97" list.
- In 2022, CBR.com ranked Madelyne Pryor 9th in their "10 Coolest X-Men Villains" list.

== Other versions ==
=== What If...? ===
- On Earth-89112, Pryor and S'ym kill baby Nathan Summers and open a portal between Limbo and Earth, allowing demons to invade Earth and killing nearly every member of the X-Men and X-Factor. Pryor gains control of the Phoenix Force from Rachel Summers, but is betrayed and killed by S'ym.
- On Earth-9250, most mutants become vampires. Pryor avoids being infected with vampirism and allies with Dormammu to release a demon army to wipe out the vampire-mutants and conquer Earth. The vampiric Jean Grey becomes Dark Phoenix and kills Pryor and Dormammu.
- On Earth-956, Pryor is a member of Mister Sinister's X-Men team alongside Cyclops and Havok. This version of Pryor was never exposed to the Phoenix Force, resulting in her remaining a mindless shell inhabited by Malice.
- In another reality, Pryor was saved from Inferno and Scott chose to reconcile with her and quit being a superhero to raise Nathan, who grows up never being infected and sent into the future. Madelyne is eventually murdered by a vengeful Sinister and his Marauders when Nathan's a teenager.

=== Mutant X ===
Pryor as "Marvel Woman" from Mutant X

In the Mutant X universe, Madelyne married and has a son with Alex Summers, as Scott was abducted by the Shi'ar along with their parents. The events of "Inferno" also played out here, though Pryor survived and is with Alex's mutant team as "Marvel Woman". Pryor's evil side as the Goblyn Queen resurfaces several times, and later becomes the "Goblyn Force" which merges with the Beyonder into a nigh-omnipotent being. Havok saves Madelyne by placing the "Nexus of Realities" into her, which purges her of the Goblyn Force.

=== Marvel Mangaverse ===
In the Marvel Mangaverse title Legacy of Fire, Madelyne is "Madelyne Pyre", a powerful sorceress and possessor of the Phoenix Sword, who trains her sister Jena to be her successor.

=== X-Men: The End ===
In X-Men: The End, Madelyne allies with the Skrull and the Shi'ar and infiltrates the X-Men in disguise to seek revenge against Cyclops. But Scott's remorse for his treatment of her leads to Pryor having second thoughts and later rejoining the X-Men. Pryor then reveals that she was a portion of Jean Grey who completely loved Cyclops and sacrifices herself to merge with Grey, which allows her to use her full power.

=== Secret Wars (2015) ===
On Battleworld in Secret Wars, Pryor is made the ruler of Limbo domain by God Emperor Doom. Pryor escaped the destruction of Battleworld and relocated to Earth-616.

After being attacked by several of her alternate-universe counterparts, Pryor is trapped in Limbo and becomes entirely demonic. The anti-mutant organization Orchis later finds and captures her. She begins working for Orchis and assists in their invading of the Limbo Embassy where she encounters the 616-universe version of Madelyne Pryor, who kills her demonic counterpart.

=== X-Men: Grand Design ===
In the X-Men: Grand Design retelling of X-Men history, the second half of the "Second Genesis" chapter has Pryor as a composite of Madelyne and supporting character Lee Forrester. Pryor's history continues in the first half of the "X-Tinction" chapter that follows, starting with the birth of Nathan Summers and concluding with her death during Inferno. Pryor is emphasized as a victim, not culpable for Inferno nor intending to harm her son, and her death is presented as accidental instead of suicide.

=== Jean Grey (2023) ===
As Jean Grey drifts between life and death after her assassination during Orchis' attack on the Hellfire Gala, she ponders what if she had made different decisions at critical chapters in her history. The Phoenix Force shows Grey one alternate history in which if Grey took different actions during Inferno, Pryor's rage and hatred would only have increased, leading her to gaining exponentially greater powers and then destroying the world. After rejecting this and other alternate scenarios shown to her, Grey accepts Pryor and all their actions and history as it was.

=== Weapon X-Men ===
On Earth-80777 of Weapon X-Men, Madelyne remained married to Scott Summers and appears to lack powers. Additionally, their son Nathan was never infected with the techno-organic virus.

=== Age of Revelation: Binary ===
In an alternate future universe depicted in "Age of Revelation", Jean Grey died and transferred the Phoenix Force to Carol Danvers. When Madelyne Pryor returns to gain control of the Phoenix Force, Danvers sacrifices herself to restore Grey and defeat Pryor.

== In other media ==
=== Television ===
- Madelyne Pryor / Goblin Queen appears in the first season of X-Men '97, voiced by Jennifer Hale.
  - Retroactively, the character appears in X-Men: The Animated Series due to having replaced Jean Grey.

=== Video games ===
- Madelyne Pryor / Black Rook appears in X-Men: Battle of the Atom.
- Madelyne Pryor / Goblin Queen appears as a playable character in Marvel: Future Fight.
- Madelyne Pryor / Goblin Queen appears as a playable character in Marvel Strike Force.
- Madelyne Pryor appears as a playable character in Marvel Contest of Champions.
