= From the Ashes (comics) =

1990 graphic novel

- Cover of the 1990 trade paperback, art by Arthur Adams
- Date: May 1990
- Main characters: X-Men
- Publisher: Marvel Comics

Creative team
- Writers: Chris Claremont
- Pencillers: Paul Smith; Walt Simonson (#171); John Romita Jr. (#176)
- Inkers: Bob Wiacek
- Letterers: Tom Orzechowski; Joe Rosen (#176)
- Colorists: Glynis Wein; Bob Sharen (#169); Janine Casey (#170)
- Editors: Louise Jones; Danny Fingeroth (#168–173); Eliot Brown (#175)

Original publication
- Published in: Uncanny X-Men
- Issues: 168–176

"From the Ashes" is a trade paperback which reprints issues #168-176 of the comic book Uncanny X-Men, published by Marvel Comics in 1990. While most trade paperbacks of the time reprinted a single story arc, From the Ashes collected three different story arcs and three single-issue stories. The stories were all written by Chris Claremont and most of them were drawn by Paul Smith and Bob Wiacek, though Walt Simonson was a guest penciller on one issue and John Romita Jr. took over as regular penciller on the series towards the end of the collected set of issues. The stories introduced Madelyne Pryor, Lockheed, the Morlocks, and Valerie Cooper, and featured Rogue joining the team. Issue #175 was a giant-sized "20th anniversary of the X-Men" issue.

== Plot ==
From the Ashes is an anthology of six different X-Men stories.

=== Professor Xavier Is a Jerk! ===
Kitty Pryde is upset that Professor X has transferred her from the X-Men roster to the New Mutants. After attending dance class with Magik, she detects an intrusion at the X-Mansion and discovers the alien dragon Lockheed in the maintenance tunnel leading to the sub-basement. Sidrian Hunters appear, having remained in the sub-basement since their last attack months ago to lay their eggs. With the help of Lockheed and Colossus, Kitty defeats the Sidri and is reinstated in the X-Men on a provisional basis while Lockheed becomes her pet.

=== The Morlocks saga ===
Warren Worthington III goes missing, and the X-Men search for him beneath the subways. They encounter the Morlocks, who abducted Warren for their leader, Callisto, to marry. During the battle between the X-Men and the Morlocks, Kitty falls ill after contact with the Morlock Plague. In order to save both Warren and Kitty, Storm challenges Callisto in a fight to the death. Despite having been infected by Plague prior to the fight, Storm defeats Callisto and assumes leadership of the Morlocks.

=== Rogue ===
Rogue runs away from Mystique and the Brotherhood of Evil Mutants and arrives at the X-Mansion to ask Xavier for help, as she has difficulty controlling the powers she absorbed from Carol Danvers. Despite distrust from the rest of the team, as well as a sudden attack by Danvers (who gained new powers as Binary), Xavier makes Rogue a probationary member of the X-Men.

=== The Wedding of Wolverine ===
The team travels to Japan for Wolverine and Mariko Yashida's wedding. The Silver Samurai and Viper plot to overthrow Mariko to take over the Yashida Clan. Wolverine initially distrusts Rogue for stealing Danvers' memories and powers, but when Rogue sacrifices herself to save Mariko from a lethal ray gun blast by Viper, he transfers his healing factor to her. The stresses of being an X-Man have caused Storm to lose finer control of her powers, producing violent weather without conscious intent. Mastermind uses illusions to make the problem appear worse than it is, and Storm takes solace in the carefree philosophy exhibited by her new Japanese friend Yukio. Storm sports a mohawk and a different outfit to reflect her new attitude. On the day of the wedding, Mariko suddenly calls off the event under the control of Mastermind.

=== Dark Phoenix Returns ===
On a trip to his grandparents in Alaska, former X-Man Cyclops meets the pilot Madelyne Pryor, who seems physically identical to Jean Grey, who became the world-destroying Dark Phoenix before she died. A romance develops between Cyclops and Madelyne. She reveals to him that she was the sole survivor of a plane crash on September 1, 1980 – the same day Jean died. Cyclops digs through files on Madelyne's background.

Cyclops proposes to Madelyne, but when he asks her if she is Phoenix, she punches him and runs away. When he pursues her, he is knocked out by Dark Phoenix, who sends him back to the X-Mansion before rendering Professor X comatose and destroying Manhattan. Cyclops realizes the Dark Phoenix attack is an illusion by Mastermind, who plotted his revenge after Phoenix left him in a catatonic state. Mastermind intends to trick the X-Men into killing Madelyne. When Cyclops tries to warn the X-Men of the scheme, Mastermind makes him appear to be Dark Phoenix and they attack him. Following a battle in the Danger Room, Cyclops makes Rogue take Xavier's powers so that she can telepathically confirm his true identity. Mastermind shoots Cyclops, but Storm defeats Mastermind with a monsoon. Cyclops discovers Madelyne drowned by the monsoon and resuscitates her. Several weeks later, Cyclops comes to terms with Jean's death and marries Madelyne.

=== Decisions ===
Cyclops and Madelyne fly to the South Pacific on their honeymoon. A storm disables the plane's engine and forces them to land on the ocean. While the couple repairs the engine, they are attacked by a giant squid. After losing his glasses during the attack, Cyclops kills the squid with the full power of his optic blast. He and Madelyne get the plane fired up and fly off to safety. Cyclops decides to decline his father Corsair's offer to join him on his spacefaring adventures, opting to settle down and enjoy a peaceful life with Madelyne. Freed from Mastermind's control, Mariko returns Wolverine's honor blade to him, but tells him that while she was under Mastermind's control, she reverted her clan back to a criminal organization. She feels she cannot marry him until she restores her clan's honor.

== Background ==
The 1980 storyline The Dark Phoenix Saga was one of the most acclaimed stories in comics. The central character, Jean Grey, dies at the end of the storyline, and when she was revived it was without the Dark Phoenix powers and persona. However, illusionary resurrections of Dark Phoenix were prominently featured in The Uncanny X-Men #157 and 174-175, enabling Marvel Comics to market a trade paperback collection incorporating the latter two issues as a sequel to The Dark Phoenix Saga. To this end, the collection was assigned the title From the Ashes, referencing how in the phoenix mythology, a phoenix rises to new life from ashes.

In The Uncanny X-Men #173 Paul Smith, having replaced Dave Cockrum as the regular penciller in issue #165, gave Storm a mohawk and a black leather outfit, which became her signature look for the majority of the 1980s. Smith's design was inspired by an incident when his colleague Walter Simonson shaved his beard and his daughter was upset by his new appearance. The front cover for the issue inspired Arthur Adams to draw his iconic Wolverine art, which became a bestselling poster and was used on t-shirts, standees, and other merchandise.

The splash page for issue #168, featuring Kitty Pryde in a ski jacket sharply turning towards the reader while yelling, "Professor Xavier is a jerk!", has been the subject of numerous homages and imitations.

The story arc presented in issues #172 and #173 is a direct sequel to the Wolverine miniseries written by Claremont and drawn by Frank Miller. They are usually collected together with the miniseries.
