= Up from the Ashes =

Up from the Ashes may refer to:

== Music ==
- Up from the Ashes (Burn Halo album) (2011) or its title track
  - "Up from the Ashes", a 2013 cover of the song by the Letter Black from Rebuild
- Up from the Ashes (Don Dokken album) (1990)
- Up from the Ashes (Naer Mataron album) (1998)
- "Up from the Ashes" (song), a 2020 song by Kanye West and Dr. Dre from Jesus Is King Part II
- "Up from the Ashes", a 2007 song by Brainstorm from the remaster of Hungry
- "Bu-ikikaesu!!" (ぶっ生き返す!! Up from the Ashes!!), a 2007 song by Maximum the Hormone from Bu-ikikaesu
- "Up from the Ashes", a 2016 song by Urban Rescue from Wild Heart

== Other uses ==
- "Up from the Ashes", an episode of Tyler Perry's House of Payne

== See also ==
- From the Ashes (disambiguation)
- Out of the Ashes (disambiguation)
- Phoenix (mythology)
