= Leave It to Chance =

American comic book series

Publication information
- Publisher: DC Comics; Image Comics
- Format: Ongoing series
- Publication date: 1996 – 1999
- No. of issues: 13
- Main character: Chance Falconer

Creative team
- Created by: James Robinson; Paul Smith
- Written by: James Robinson
- Artist: Paul Smith

Collected editions
- Shaman's Rain: ISBN 1-58240-253-1
- Trick or Threat & Other Stories: ISBN 1-58240-041-5

Leave it to Chance is an American comic book series written and published by James Robinson, illustrated by penciler Paul Smith and published by Image Comics. It features the adventures of Chance Falconer, the 14-year-old daughter of famed paranormal investigator Lucas Falconer, and her pet dragon, St. George.

It was published irregularly for twelve issues from 1996 to 1999 (#12 was the only one published by DC Comics), with issue #13 released by Image in 2002. A hardcover edition of the series was published the same year, #5 was reprinted as Image's offering for Free Comic Book Day in 2003 and issue #13 seemed to start a new storyline, featuring a short recap of the previous issues at the beginning, as well as rogues' gallery, pinups, and character sketches at the end of the book, but was not followed by further issues.

== Background ==
Leave it to Chance is set in a world where supernatural elements are fairly commonplace, and the existence of monsters, ghosts, demons, magicians and other similar beings is general knowledge – for example, mobsters routinely use magic to transform their men into powerful "troggs", and the city the series is set in, Devil's Echo, has a community of goblins inhabiting its sewers.

Members of the Falconer family have a legacy of battling supernatural threats, and traditionally training for the cause is begun at the age of 14. Chance, however, is not given that opportunity by her father, who refuses to train her. He insists that the tradition is not to pass the knowledge "from father to child", but "from father to son" and points out that the job is too dangerous for her. This decision appears not to be motivated by a patronizing attitude or misogyny, but rather by the fact that he has already lost his wife to supernatural forces in an incident where his own face was deformed, and doesn't want Chance to suffer the same fate. Instead, he suggests that the tradition should skip a generation, and Chance should meet a man, get married and have a son, whom Lucas may then train instead.

Chance however isn't willing to accept that decision, and although Lucas frowns on his daughter's escapades and repeated attempts to investigate crimes and incidents that involve the supernatural, Chance is set on following the family trade on her own. Later in the series, it is implied that Lucas is secretly pleased by his daughter's courage and skill, even though he prefers to present the image of a strict but caring disciplinarian.

== Supporting cast ==
Chance's father Lucas Falconer is a constant presence, who is also employing butler Hobbs and a housekeeper Quince, while Dash the faerie lives in the garden. More attention settled on Will Bendix is a sly yet effective newspaper reporter vying for attention of Margo Vela, a police officer unlucky with men. Lt. Ben Saunders and mayor Calloway represent local authorities. Chance's friends are Zoe, Emily, Kay and Ruby. The city, with its mix of communities and architecture is more fleshed out to be more than just a setting.

== Storylines ==
The series started with a four-part storyline, collected in the Shaman's Rain trade paperback, introducing the characters and premise, along with the city of Devil's Echo. Preparing to leave her childhood and distance from her faerie friend Dash, Chance Falconer investigates the attack on a shaman that came to the city with his daughter in the midst of political back-stabbing preceding the elections. Her father absent, Chance still decides to get tangled up in unraveling the plot to destroy the city. Making allies in the police department and the newspapers, she ultimately reveals an antagonist from her father's most disturbing case using the political unrest to fuel greater troubles to the city.

The next several issues spotlighted Chance's short adventures, collected in Trick or Threat and Other Stories. The title story took place during the Halloween parade, when Chance with the help of her father's friend Jean Pierre tracks Stanley, monkey stolen from a child called Greg to be used as part of an occult ritual bent on gathering power for a faction of antagonists. Other stories included a 2-part story centering on Chance being sent in the school for girls built upon what is said to be pirate Captain Hitch's lair, where she investigates the strange happenings connected to the rumors of the Captain's ghost roaming the halls. "The Phantom of the Mall" had Chance and her newfound school friends back at Devil's Echo being drawn in a mystery of a masked figure taking revenge on the mall he had previous ties with. The short stories seemed designed to introduce several antagonists who would eventually cross paths with Chance again

The Monster Madness trade paperback consists mainly of a two-part story where a cinema-owner's scheme goes awry, and with the help of a magician the horror icons not only escape the movie they appear in but bring trouble to Devil's Echo. The horror icons are stand ins for movie monsters: Count represents Dracula, Pharaoh – the Mummy, Howler – the Wolf man (who infected Margo's partner Roger Howard) and the Man Monster – Monster of Frankenstein. The arc is singular in that it was open-ended, with larger power behind the scenes and his magician unseen – Chance seemed attracted by one of his helpers called Lightfoot who was part of the plan to use the monster's rampage as a diversion for looting. A short story appeared next, with the Falconer household attending a hockey game finale in which a player goes missing and another returns from recent death thanks to shady agendas surrounding the game.

Two more issues were published but not yet collected, the first one of which showing Chance getting back to her promise made in #1 that she will see faerie Dash in her garden again. Using the potion Lewis Carroll gave to her father, she shrinks and visits the garden, helping Dash fight another, more brutal species of faeries that left Devil's Echo due to bad magic. That storyline foreshadowed events to come in the series. Several years later, the double-sized last issue (to date) has been published revolving around the storyline of Lucas Falconer's murder. It featured a large cast of characters, with Jean Pierre, Margo, Roger and Bendix helping Chance investigate psychic Milo Otway impersonator's causing a plague of zombies that distracts the city while Lightfoot and captain Hitch do his business with possibly Lucas Falconer following them, having faked his death before. The story ended with Chance recognized by the city as its new protector and ready to unveil the larger plot.

== Awards ==
The series won several awards in 1997: The Harvey Award for Best New Series, and the Eisner Awards for Best New Series and Best Title for Younger Readers. A collection of issues #1–4, named Leave it to Chance: Shaman's Rain was a top vote-getter for the Comics Buyer's Guide Fan Award for Favorite Reprint Graphic Album for 1998.
