= Out of the Ashes =

Out of the Ashes may refer to:

- Out of the Ashes (2003 film), an American TV film about the Holocaust
- Out of the Ashes (2010 film), a documentary of the Afghanistan national cricket team's qualification for the 2010 ICC World Twenty20 tournament
- Out of the Ashes (novel), a post-apocalyptic novel by William W. Johnstone
- Out of the Ashes (Defiance album), 2002
- Out of the Ashes (Jessi Colter album), 2006
- Out of the Ashes (Katra album), 2010
- Out of the Ashes (Lammy book), a 2011 book by David Lammy
- "Out of the Ashes" (The Walking Dead), an episode of The Walking Dead
- "Out of the Ashes", a song by Symphony X from The Divine Wings of Tragedy
- Spirit of Atlanta's 2015 Drum and Bugle Corps performance

== See also ==
- Out of Ashes, an album by Dead by Sunrise
- From the Ashes (disambiguation)
- Up from the Ashes (disambiguation)
