= Marvel Girl =

Marvel Girl is an alias used by at least three fictional Marvel Comics superheroines:

- Jean Grey, best known as a founding member of the X-Men
- Valeria Richards, daughter of Mister Fantastic and the Invisible Woman (of the Fantastic Four)
- Rachel Summers, a.k.a. Phoenix, member of the X-Men, Excalibur, and Starjammers; alternate timeline daughter of Cyclops (Scott Summers) and Jean Grey

== See also ==
- Marvel Comics
