= From the Ashes: The Pit =

2026 Saudi Arabian film

- Directed by: Abdullah Bamajboor
- Written by: Haifa Al Said; Maryam Al Hajri
- Produced by: Ayman Jamal
- Starring: Moudi Abdullah; Aseel Morya; Aseel Seraj; Wafaa Alwafi
- Production company: Ideation Studio
- Distributed by: Netflix
- Release date: 22 January 2026
- Country: Saudi Arabia
- Language: Arabic

From the Ashes: The Pit is a 2026 Saudi Arabian survival thriller film directed by Abdullah Bamajboor. A sequel to From the Ashes (2024), it was released on Netflix on 22 January 2026 and was the first Arabic-language sequel to a Middle Eastern original produced for the service.

== Plot ==
The film is set at a girls' school where a sudden collapse traps a group of young women underground as floodwater rises around them. Where the first film turned on a fire, the sequel confines its characters together and forces them to confront unresolved conflicts between them while they attempt to escape.

== Cast ==
- Moudi Abdullah
- Aseel Morya
- Aseel Seraj
- Wafaa Alwafi
- Adwa Fahad
- Darin AlBayed
- Aisha Al Rifaie

== Production ==
The film was made by the Saudi company Ideation Studio and written by Haifa Al Said and Maryam Al Hajri. It was announced as part of Netflix's 2026 slate of Arabic titles.

== Release and reception ==
From the Ashes: The Pit was released on Netflix on 22 January 2026 and entered the service's top ten in 21 countries within 24 hours. It placed third on Netflix's global list of non-English films in its first week and fifth in its second, accumulating 2.4 million views and 3.6 million hours viewed.

Speaking to The National, the actor Moudi Abdullah said she had received messages from viewers around the world following the release. The producer Ayman Jamal said the response had led the company to consider a third film.
