= Jean Grey =

Marvel Comics fictional character

Jean Grey Phoenix / Marvel Girl
- Various incarnations of Jean Grey from textless cover of X-Men #1 (October 2019). Art by Russell Dauterman.

Publication information
- Publisher: Marvel Comics
- First appearance: The X-Men #1 (September 1963)
- Created by: Stan Lee (writer); Jack Kirby (artist/co-plotter)

In-story information
- Full name: Jean Elaine Grey-Summers
- Species: Human mutant
- Place of origin: Annandale-on-Hudson, New York, United States
- Team affiliations: X-Men; Quiet Council of Krakoa; Brides of Set; Muir Island X-Men; Clan Rebellion; X-Terminators; Hellfire Club; The Twelve; X-Factor; X-Force
- Notable aliases: Marvel Girl; Phoenix; Dark Phoenix; White Phoenix of the Crown; Redd Dayspring; Jean Grey-Summers
- Abilities: Astral projection; Telekinesis; Telepathy; Empathy; As Phoenix Force: Cosmic pyrokinesis; Matter manipulation; Resurrection; Teleportation; Immortality

Jean Elaine Grey is a superhero appearing in American comic books published by Marvel Comics, usually those featuring the X-Men, a group of superheroes of which she is a founding member. Created by writer Stan Lee and artist/co-plotter Jack Kirby, the character first appeared in The X-Men #1 (September 1963). Jean Grey is a member of a subspecies of humans known as mutants—individuals born with superhuman abilities—with Jean possessing psionic powers. Initially capable of using only telekinesis, she later develops the powers of telepathy and empathy. During her early years with the X-Men, she used the codename Marvel Girl.

Jean is a caring and nurturing figure, but struggles with the pressure of being both an Omega-level mutant and the physical manifestation of the Phoenix Force, an extremely powerful cosmic entity. When Jean sacrifices herself to save the X-Men, she is resurrected as the infinitely powerful Phoenix in the X-Men storyline "The Dark Phoenix Saga"; however, she is then turned, against her will, into Dark Phoenix thanks to the Hellfire Club's manipulation. Jean sacrifices herself yet again to save creation. After her presumed death, Jean returns and resumes her relationship with Cyclops, whom she later marries. Following her return, Jean fosters relationships with Rachel Summers, her daughter from an alternate future, and Cable, the son of Cyclops and Jean's clone Madelyne Pryor.

After Jean dies a second time, Beast brings a younger, time-displaced version of Jean into the present, alongside the rest of her original teammates. Eventually, Jean is resurrected by the Phoenix Force once more, but she chooses to part ways with it and live her own life separately from it. Following her return, Jean briefly assumes leadership of the X-Men's Red Team, until the "Krakoan Age", during which she returns to the moniker of Marvel Girl. Resuming her relationship with Cyclops following his resurrection, Jean reconnects with the Phoenix Force, and takes to the cosmos, but assures Cyclops that she will not be in space forever. Phoenix eventually returns to Earth to fight alongside the X-Men again.

Jean's exact relationship to the Phoenix Force has often been changed throughout the character's history, as has her involvement in the events of "The Dark Phoenix Saga". Usually depicted as the Phoenix Force's favorite and most compatible host, storylines in 2024 revealed that Jean is actually the human manifestation of the Phoenix Force and its mother. Her connection to the Phoenix Force has often resulted in clashes with the Shi'ar empire, responsible for the massacre of most of her family members.

Often listed as one of the most notable and powerful female characters in Marvel Comics, Jean has been featured in various Marvel-licensed products, including video games, animated television series, and merchandise. In film, the character has been portrayed by Famke Janssen and Sophie Turner in 20th Century Fox's X-Men film series (2000–2019). Sadie Sink portrays the character in the Marvel Cinematic Universe, beginning with Spider-Man: Brand New Day (2026). The character also appears as one of the lead characters in X-Men: The Animated Series (1992–1997), voiced by Catherine Disher, and subsequently appears in the revival X-Men '97 (2024–present), voiced by Jennifer Hale.

== Publication history ==
=== 1960s ===
Jean Grey debuted under the code name Marvel Girl in The X-Men #1 (September 1963), created by writer Stan Lee and artist/co-writer Jack Kirby. In the initial issue, Grey is introduced along with Cyclops, Beast, Iceman, and Warren Worthington III, as the students of Professor X, who battle Magneto. The original team's sole female member, Marvel Girl was a regular part of the team through the series' publication. The masculine characters often express their attraction to Marvel Girl. Initially possessing the ability of telekinesis, the character was later granted the power of telepathy, which would be retconned years later as a suppressed mutant ability. Later issues of X-Men of the mid-1960s written by Roy Thomas emphasize the subplot of the "melodramatic unrequited romance" between Scott Summers and Jean Grey.

=== 1970s ===
In the early 1970s, X-Men only reprinted earlier issues. It was revived in 1975 by Len Wein and Dave Cockrum, creating a new international group. Chris Claremont became the primary writer of the series with issue #94 (August 1975) and continued for the next sixteen years. Under the authorship of Claremont and the artwork of first Cockrum and then John Byrne in the late 1970s, Jean Grey underwent a significant transformation from the X-Men's weakest member to its most powerful.

The first comic Claremont saw at Marvel after coming there in 1969 was the first X-Men issue penciled by Neal Adams (issue 56), whose portrayal led him to become enamored of Jean Grey. But when he started to write X-Men in issue 94, the first issue after the creation of the new team in Giant-Size X-Men 1, Len Wein had already decided that she was leaving the team. Claremont reintroduced the character in issue 97, when he became the sole writer of the title, and upgraded her powers significantly.

Jean as Marvel Girl from House of X#1. Art by Pepe Larraz.

Cyclops and Jean Grey have a complex relationship, with Cyclops sometimes competing with Wolverine for her attention. In X-Men #98, Scott and Jean solidify their relationship when she initiates their first kiss. When Jean Grey becomes the Phoenix, Cyclops expresses fear and insecurity regarding her extraordinary power level. The storyline in which Jean Grey died as Marvel Girl and was reborn as Phoenix (The Uncanny X-Men #101–108, 1976–1977) has been retroactively dubbed by fans "The Phoenix Saga".

=== 1980s ===
The storyline of Jean Grey's eventual corruption and death as Dark Phoenix (The Uncanny X-Men #129–138, 1980) has been termed "The Dark Phoenix Saga". During this storyline, Cyclops engages in competition with Mastermind (Jason Wyngarde) for the affections and destiny of Grey, with Wyngarde attempting to corrupt her. Grey appears to die at the conclusion of the story. This storyline, including Jean Grey's suicidal sacrifice to save all of creation, is one of the most well-known and heavily referenced in mainstream American superhero comics, and is widely considered a classic.

When the first trade paperback of "The Dark Phoenix Saga" was published in 1984, Marvel also published a 48-page special issue titled Phoenix: The Untold Story. It contained the original version of The Uncanny X-Men #137 (in which, instead of sacrificing herself, Jean Grey was depowered), the original splash page for The Uncanny X-Men #138 and transcripts of a roundtable discussion between Shooter, Claremont, Byrne, editors Jim Salicrup and Louise Jones, and inker Terry Austin. The discussion was about the creation of the new Phoenix persona, the development of the story, and what led to its eventual change, and Claremont and Byrne's plans for Jean Grey, had she survived.

Chris Claremont, the longest-running writer of the X-Men comics, revealed that his and Cockrum's motivation for Jean Grey's transformation into Phoenix was to create "the first female cosmic hero". The two hoped that, like Thor had been integrated into The Avengers lineup, Phoenix would also become an effective and immensely powerful member of the X-Men. However, both Salicrup and Byrne had strong feelings against how powerful Phoenix had become, feeling that she drew too much focus in the book and the other X-Men were now "background characters".. Thus, Byrne worked with Claremont to effectively remove Phoenix from the storyline, initially by removing her powers. However, Byrne's decision to have Dark Phoenix destroy an inhabited planetary system in The Uncanny X-Men #135, coupled with the planned ending to the story arc, worried then-Editor-in-Chief Jim Shooter, who felt that allowing Jean to live at the conclusion of the story was both morally unacceptable (given that she was now a "mass murderer") and also an unsatisfying ending from a storytelling point of view. Shooter publicly laid out his reasoning in the 1984 roundtable:

I personally think, and I've said this many times, that having a character destroy an inhabited world with billions of people, wipe out a starship and then—well, you know, having the powers removed and being let go on Earth. It seems to me that that's the same as capturing Hitler alive and letting him go live on Long Island. Now, I don't think the story would end there. I think a lot of people would come to his door with machine guns...

One of the creative team's questions that affected the story's conclusion was whether the Phoenix's personality and later descent into madness and evil were inherent to Jean Grey or if the Phoenix was itself an entity merely possessing her. The relationship between Jean Grey and the Phoenix would continue to be subject to different interpretations and explanations by writers and editors at Marvel Comics following the story's retcon in 1986, which revealed that the Phoenix was actually a cosmic entity in the form of Jean Grey, and the real Jean was cocooned elsewhere. At the time of the Dark Phoenix's creation, Byrne felt that, "If someone could be seen to corrupt Jean, rather than her just turning bad, this could make for an interesting story." Salicrup and Byrne stated later that they viewed Phoenix as an entity that entirely possessed Jean Grey, therefore absolving her of its crimes once it was driven out. However, the creative and editorial team ultimately agreed that Phoenix had been depicted as an inherent and inseparable aspect of Jean Grey, meaning that the character was fully responsible for her actions as Phoenix. As a result, Shooter ordered that Claremont and Byrne rewrite issue #137 to explicitly place in the story both a consequence and an ending commensurate with the enormity of Phoenix's actions. In a 2012 public signing, Claremont spoke about the context of the late 1970s and the end of the Vietnam War during the story's writing, stating that the history of these events also made Jean Grey's genocidal actions difficult to redeem.

In the original ending, Jean does not revert to Dark Phoenix, and the Shi'ar subject her to a "psychic lobotomy", permanently removing all her telepathic or telekinetic powers. Claremont and Byrne planned to later have Magneto offer Jean the chance to restore her abilities, but Jean choosing to remain depowered and eliminate the threat of Dark Phoenix returning to power.

The unfinished cover for X-Factor #1, before Bob Layton and Jackson Guice decided on the fifth team member. (X-Factor #1) Art by Jackson Guice.

After several years, Marvel decided to revive the character, but only after an editorial decree that the character be absolved of her actions during The Dark Phoenix Saga. Writer Kurt Busiek is credited with devising the plot to revive Jean Grey. Busiek, a fan of the original five X-Men, was displeased with the character's death and formulated various storylines that would have met Shooter's rule and allowed the character to return to the X-Men franchise. He eventually shared his storyline idea with fellow writer Roger Stern who mentioned it to Byrne, who was both writing and illustrating the Fantastic Four at the time. Both series writer Bob Layton and artist Jackson Guice, who were developing the series X-Factor—a team of former X-Men—had yet to settle on their fifth team member, initially considering Dazzler. Layton opted to fill the open spot with Jean instead, and both he and Byrne submitted the idea to Shooter, who approved it. Jean Grey's revival became a crossover plotline between the Avengers under Stern, Fantastic Four under Byrne, and X-Factor under Layton.

Busiek later found out that his idea had been used thanks to Layton, and he was credited in Fantastic Four #286 and paid for his contributions. The decision to revive Jean Grey was controversial among fans, with some appreciating the return of the character and others feeling it weakened the impact of the Dark Phoenix Saga's ending. Busiek maintained that the idea that led to Jean Grey's official return to Marvel Comics was merely a case of sharing his ideas with friends as a fan, and that he neither formally pitched the idea to anyone nor gave it the final go ahead. Claremont expressed dissatisfaction with the retcon, stating in 2012: "We'd just gone to all the effort of saying, 'Jean is dead, get over it,' and they said, 'Haha, we fibbed.' So why should anyone trust us again? But that's the difference between being the writer and being the boss." In a 2008 interview Byrne said he still felt Busiek's method of reviving Jean Grey was "brilliant", but agreed that in retrospect the character should have remained dead.

In the comics, having been fully established as separate from the "Jean Grey" duplicate created and possessed by the Phoenix Force, Jean is absolved of involvement in the atrocities of "The Dark Phoenix" storyline, and she returned in the first issue of X-Factor (1st Series).

The Uncanny X-Men #141 (January 1981) introduces Rachel Summers, the daughter of Cyclops and Jean Grey from the alternate timeline of the Days of Future Past. She joins the X-Men in a storyline concluding in issue #199. In Uncanny X-Men #168 (April 1983), Cyclops meets Madelyne Pryor, a woman who is mysteriously identical to Jean Grey. He eventually marries and fathers a child with her. Claremont later commented on how Jean's revival affected his original plans for Madelyne Pryor, stating that the relationship between the two women was intended to be entirely coincidental. He intended Madelyne only to look like Jean by coincidence and exist as a means for Cyclops to move on with his life and be written out of the X-Men franchise, part of what he believed to be a natural progression for any member of the team. However, Marvel's editors decided that he should appear in a new series. This new series, X-Factor, launched in 1986 and starred the original X-Men team. Cyclops leaves his wife and child behind to lead the reunited original X-Men, under the X-Factor name. Claremont expressed dismay that Jean's resurrection ultimately resulted in Cyclops abandoning his wife and child, tarnishing his written persona as a hero and "decent human being".

For X-Factor, writer Bob Layton was partly inspired by the film Ghostbusters; the X-Factor team advertised themselves as mutant hunters, but worked to rehabilitate and educate the mutants they discovered. Layton left the title after five issues and was replaced by Louise Simonson, who introduced the new villain Apocalypse, first appearing in X-Factor #6 (July 1986). Soon after the beginning publication of X-Factor, Marvel also reprinted and released the original X-Men series under the title Classic X-Men. These reissues paired the original stories with new vignettes, elaborating on plot points. One such issue, Classic X-Men #8 (April 1987), paired the original The X-Men #100 (Aug. 1976) story of Jean Grey's disastrous return flight from space immediately preceding her transformation into Phoenix ("Greater Love Hath No X-Man...") with the new story "Phoenix". The story further supported the retcon establishing Jean Grey and the Phoenix Force as two separate entities.

Mister Sinister, a geneticist who sometimes works with Apocalypse, first appears in Uncanny X-Men #221 (September 1987). Pryor is eventually revealed to be a clone of Jean Grey created by Mister Sinister, who has been meddling with the Summers family for decades. Her own mutant psychic powers awaken, and Madelyne goes insane and becomes a villain named the Goblin Queen, seeking vengeance. Following the conclusion of "Inferno", Jean continued to be a mainstay character throughout the rest of X-Factor. In a later story, Scott's son with Madelyne Pryor, Nathan, is infected with a techno-organic virus. Rachel Summers brings him to the future to be saved.

=== 1990s and 2000s ===
X-Factor (1st Series) ended its run featuring the original X-Men with X-Factor #70 (Sept. 1991), with the characters transitioning over to The Uncanny X-Men, explained in continuity as the two teams deciding to merge. The fourteen X-Men divide into two teams—"Blue" and "Gold"—led by Cyclops and Storm, respectively. Jean was added to the Gold Team beginning in The Uncanny X-Men #281 (Oct. 1991). In the X-Cutioner's Song story line (1992-1993), Scott and Jean are captured by Mister Sinister and traded to a new villain, Stryfe. After escaping, they eventually discover that Cable is Nathan, the son of Scott and Madelyne Pryor, having grown up in a future timeline, and that Stryfe is Cable's clone. Cyclops and Jean Grey then marry, in X-Men vol. 2 #30 (March 1994). In summer 1994, Jean Grey appeared in the four-issue miniseries The Adventures of Cyclops and Phoenix, which recounts how she and Cyclops traveled to the future to raise Nathan Summers, explaining the childhood of Cable. In 1995, the X-titles were all replaced in a crossover taking place in an alternate future called Age of Apocalypse. An alternate version of Jean Grey appeared alongside an alternate version of Wolverine in a new title called Weapon X. The decade concluded with a storyline called Apocalypse: The Twelve in which Apocalypse takes control of Cyclops' body.

Following Cyclops's possession by the mutant villain Apocalypse and disappearance in the conclusion of the crossover storyline "Apocalypse: The Twelve", Jean lost her telekinetic abilities and was left with increased psychic powers, the result of the "six-month gap" in plot across the X-Men franchise created by the Revolution revamp. During the Revolution event, all X-Men titles began six months after the events of Apocalypse: The Twelve, allowing writers to create fresh situations and stories and gradually fill in the missing events of the previous six months of continuity. Due to editing decisions following the success of the 2000 X-Men film, which depicted the character of Jean Grey with both telepathy and telekinesis, an explanation for Jean's altered powers in the comics was never explicitly made, though writer Chris Claremont revealed in interviews that it was intended to be an accidental power switch between fellow X-Man Psylocke, explaining Psylocke's new telekinetic powers as well.

In February 2001, an alternate version of Jean Grey began appearing in a new ongoing series by Mark Millar, Ultimate X-Men. Jean was next featured in the six-issue miniseries X-Men Forever written by Fabian Nicieza, which was designed to tie up the remaining plot lines. During the series, Jean revisited many of the events involving the Phoenix Force and the series introduced the concept of "Omega level mutants", a category for mutants with unlimited potential, which included Jean herself. In June 2001, X-Men was retitled as New X-Men under writer Grant Morrison; the series pursued a more experimental approach to storytelling and characterization. The title consisted of a smaller team featuring Jean, Cyclops, Beast, Wolverine, Emma Frost, and Charles Xavier. The overarching plot focused on the team assuming the roles of teachers to a new generation of mutants at the Xavier Institute while navigating their personal relationships and dealing with newly emerging pro- and anti-mutant political sentiments. Jean also made minor appearances in other titles during the New X-Men run, such as Chris Claremont's X-Treme X-Men, occasionally lending support to the characters. Jean Grey dies again in New X-Men #150 (February 2004).

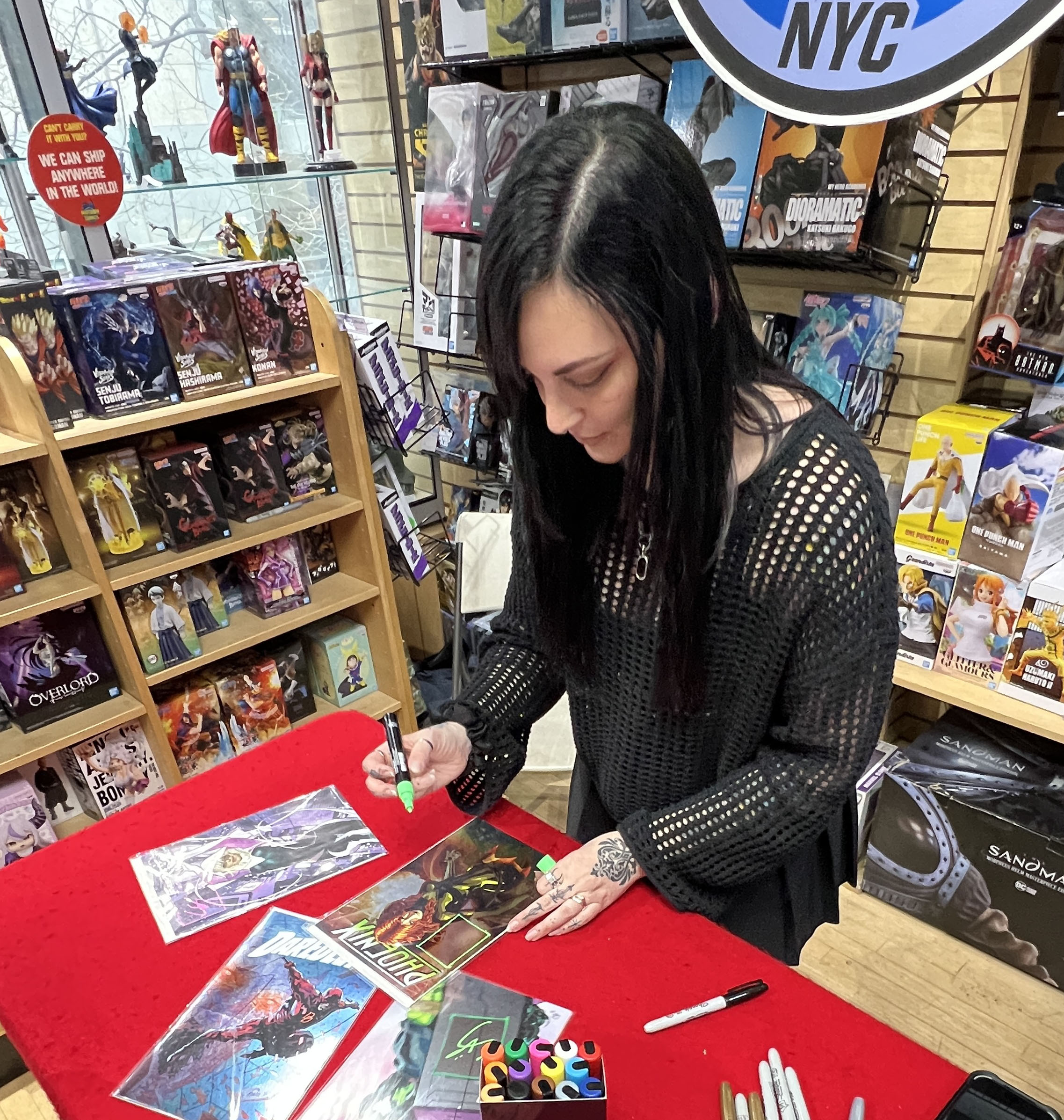
Writer Stephanie Phillips autographing a copy of Phoenix at an April 2026 signing at Midtown Comics in Manhattan

Jean and her connection with the Phoenix Force was examined again one year after the conclusion of Morrison's run on New X-Men in X-Men: Phoenix – Endsong written by Greg Pak in 2005. At the 2010 San Diego Comic-Con X-Men panel, when asked whether or not Jean would return, editor Nick Lowe responded by saying, "She's dead."

Regarding Jean's actual return to the X-Men franchise, Marvel indicated that Jean's eventual return was being discussed, but stated that the return of Jean Grey was "a story Marvel does not want to rush". Marvel loosely tied questions regarding Jean Grey's eventual return to the events in 2007's X-Men: Messiah Complex in which a mutant girl named Hope—who has red hair, green eyes, and immense mutant powers—is born. In a sense, Hope functioned as a substitute for Jean.

=== 2010s ===
The 2010 storyline "X-Men: Second Coming" sees Hope's return as a teenager and the return of the Phoenix Force. Following the conclusion of Avengers vs. X-Men as part of the Marvel NOW! initiative, a teenage Jean Grey and the four other founding members of X-Men are transported across time to the present day by Beast in the series All-New X-Men by Brian Michael Bendis.

The original adult Jean Grey returned to the Marvel Universe in a new series titled Phoenix Resurrection: The Return of Jean Grey, released on December 27, 2017. The series was written by Matthew Rosenberg with art by Leinil Francis Yu. She featured as a leading character in X-Men Red, beginning in 2018.

Following the events of the 2018 "Extermination" storyline, the time-displaced Jean Grey and the other original X-Men are returned to their original time, as part of writer Jonathan Hickman's plan to reboot the entire X-Men franchise.

== Fictional character biography ==
Jean Elaine Grey was born the second daughter of John and Elaine Grey. She had an older sister, Sara Grey-Bailey. John Grey was a professor at Bard College in upstate New York. Depictions of Jean's childhood and her relations with her family have shown a stable, loving family life growing up.

Jean's mutant powers of telepathy and telekinesis first manifests when her best friend, Annie Richardson, was hit by a car and killed. Jean mentally linked with her friend and nearly died as well. The event left her comatose, and she was brought back to consciousness when her parents sought the help of powerful mutant telepath, Charles Xavier. Xavier blocked her telepathy until she was old enough to be able to control it, leaving her with access only to her telekinetic powers. Xavier later recruited her as a teenager to be part of his X-Men team as "Marvel Girl", the team's sole female member. After several missions with the X-Men, Xavier removed Jean's mental blocks and she was able to use and control her telepathic powers. She began a relationship with teammate Cyclops, which persisted as her main romantic relationship.

During an emergency mission in space, the X-Men find their shuttle damaged. Jean pilots the shuttle back to Earth, but is exposed to fatal levels of radiation. On the brink of death, but determined to save Cyclops and her friends, Jean calls out for help and is answered by the cosmic entity the Phoenix Force. The Phoenix Force, the sum of all life in the universe, is moved by Jean's wish to save herself and her friends. It takes the form of a duplicate body to house Jean's psyche. The duplication is so exact that the Phoenix Force believes itself to be Jean Grey, and places Jean's dying body in a healing cocoon. This cocoon is later described as a Phoenix Egg. The ship crashes in Jamaica Bay, with the other X-Men unharmed.

The Phoenix Force, assuming Jean's identity, emerges wearing a new costume and adopts the codename "Phoenix"; meanwhile, the cocoon containing the real Jean Grey sinks to the bottom of the bay, unnoticed. Phoenix continues her life as Jean Grey with the other X-Men, joining them on missions and even helping to save the universe. During "The Dark Phoenix Saga", Phoenix becomes overwhelmed and corrupted by her first taste of evil and transforms into a force of total destruction called "Dark Phoenix", inadvertently killing the inhabitants of a planetary system after consuming its star, and jeopardizing the entire universe. However, Jean's personality manages to take control and she commits suicide to ensure that all creation will not be destroyed.

Upon its suicide by way of a disintegration ray, the Phoenix Force disperses into its original form and a fragment locates the still-healing Jean at the bottom of Jamaica Bay. In trying to bond with her, Jean senses its memories of death and destruction as Dark Phoenix and rejects it, causing it to bond with and animate a lifeless clone of Jean Grey created by the villain Mister Sinister. Sinister created the clone to mate with Cyclops to create genetically superior mutants. Named "Madelyne Pryor", the clone, unaware of her true identity, meets Cyclops in a situation engineered by Sinister and the two fall in love, marry, and have a child, Nathan Christopher Summers. Meanwhile, the cocoon is discovered and retrieved by the Avengers and the Fantastic Four. Jean emerges with no memory of the actions of the Phoenix/Dark Phoenix. The Avengers and Fantastic Four tell her of what happened and that she was believed dead until now. She is reunited with the original X-Men and convinces them to form the new superhero team X-Factor, reusing her "Marvel Girl" codename. Madelyne is angered over Cyclops's decision to lead X-Factor and neglect his family. Though Jean encourages Cyclops to return to Madelyne, he finds their house abandoned and assumes that Madelyne has left him and taken their infant son. Cyclops returns to X-Factor and he and Jean continue their relationship, but the Phoenix Force's impersonation, and his marrying Madelyne, damaged their mutual trust. The team's adventures continue throughout the series, culminating in the line-wide "Inferno" crossover. Madelyne reappears, now insane and with dark powers awakened by a demonic pact, calling herself the Goblyn Queen.

Learning of her true identity and purpose as a clone created by Mister Sinister drove her completely insane and she plans to sacrifice Nathan Christopher to achieve greater power and unleash literal Hell on Earth. While attempting to stop her, Jean is reunited with the other X-Men, who are happy to learn that she is alive. Jean and Madelyne confront each other, and Madelyne attempts to kill them both. Dying, Jean meets the remnant of the Phoenix Force housed within Madelyne, who offers to save her life again, but she has to accept it. Jean accepts that Phoenix and she are one, and absorbs the Phoenix part of her psyche, giving her both Madelyne's memories and the Phoenix's memories from "The Dark Phoenix Saga".

Unsure of herself since returning to life, Jean finds possessing the Phoenix Force and Madelyne's memories to be difficult. She also struggles with Phoenix and Madelyne's personalities/egos, who fight for control over her mind. After X-Factor are summoned to a world about to be judged by the Celestials, Jean is nearly taken over by those personalities, but she drains their power and purges them, leaving only Phoenix and Madelyne's memories. Back on Earth, Cyclops proposes to her and she meets her alternate future daughter Rachel Summers (who goes by the codename "Phoenix" as well and is also able to tap into the Phoenix Force), but Jean rejects them both out of the feeling that they indicate that her life is predetermined. Jean had learned during the Inferno event that her rejecting the Phoenix Force caused Madelyne to wake; Cyclops admits to Susan Storm Richards that Jean sometimes wishes that the Fantastic Four had not found her, and that he does not know how to communicate with her. When X-Factor unites with the X-Men, Jean joins the Gold Team, led by Storm. She deliberately chooses not to use a codename, so the team simply uses her civilian name. After some time, she makes up with Rachel, welcoming her into her life, and proposes to Cyclops and the two marry. On their honeymoon, the couple is immediately psychically transported 2000 years into the future to raise Cyclops's son Nathan, who had been transported to the future as an infant in hopes of curing him of a deadly virus. Jean adopts the identity of "Redd" along with Cyclops ("Slym") and they raise Nathan Christopher for twelve years before they are sent back into their bodies on their wedding honeymoon. Jean learns that a time-displaced Rachel had used her powers to transport them to the future to protect Nathan; per Rachel's request, Jean adopts the codename "Phoenix" once again to establish it as a symbol of good after all the bad it had caused. As her powers increase, Jean also decides to wear the original Phoenix's gold-and-green costume. Jean also met another alternate future child of hers and Scott's: the immensely powerful Nathan Grey, who accidentally revived the psionic ghost of Madelyne Pryor, leading to another confrontation between the two women.

Following Cyclops's possession by the mutant villain Apocalypse and apparent death, Jean continues with the X-Men, but is distraught by the loss of her husband. She later learns that she is an "Omega-level" mutant with unlimited potential. Jean begins to suspect that Cyclops may still be alive and with the help of Nathan Summers (now the aged superhero "Cable"), is able to locate and free Cyclops of his possession by Apocalypse. The couple return to the X-Men as part of the Xavier Institute's teaching staff to a new generation of mutants. While Jean finds she is slowly able to tap into the powers of the Phoenix Force once again, her marriage to Scott begins to fail. Jean and Wolverine meet in the woods where Jean confides her feelings of distance towards Scott while Wolverine also shuts down any interest in a relationship he himself had with Jean by telling her that he knew a relationship between the two would never work and walks away from her; Cyclops grows further alienated from Jean due to her growing powers and institute responsibilities and seeks consolation from the telepathic Emma Frost to address his disillusionment and his experiences while possessed by Apocalypse. Emma psychically manipulates Scott and tries to psychically seduce him, which Jean interrupts and discovers, though she would later learn Emma was in love with Scott. Jean also realizes that Scott and Emma never had a physical affair and that Emma had, to an extent, taken advantage of Scott to telepathically seduce him.

In a final confrontation with a traitor at the institute (the X-Men's teammate Xorn, posing as Magneto) Jean fully realizes and assumes complete control of the powers of the Phoenix Force, but is killed in a last-ditch lethal attack by Xorn. Jean dies, telling Scott "to live". However, after her funeral, Scott rejects Emma and her offer to run the school together. This creates a dystopian future where all life and natural evolution is under assault by the infectious, villainous, sentient bacteria "Sublime". Jean is resurrected in this future timeline and becomes the fully realized White Phoenix of the Crown, using the abilities of the Phoenix Force to defeat Sublime and eliminate the dystopic future by reaching back in time and telling Cyclops to move on. This leads him to accept Emma's love and her offer to run the school together. Jean then reconciles with Cyclops and fully bonds with the Phoenix Force and ascends to a higher plane of existence called the "White Hot Room".

Restored to life, Jean gathers some of the greatest minds on Earth together so that she can read their minds to plan her next move. Recognizing that there has been a sudden surge in anti-mutant sentiment, to the point where there are plans to abort pregnancies if the mutant gene is detected, Jean announces her plans to establish a more official mutant nation, making it clear that she will not establish a geographic location for said nation as past examples make it clear that doing so just makes mutants a target. To support her in this goal, she assembles a team including Nightcrawler, X-23 and Namor, but is unaware that her actions are being observed by Cassandra Nova.

The adult Jean returns to using her original Marvel Girl codename and wears her second green-and-yellow Marvel Girl costume. She is sent as part of a strike team to outer space to stop a satellite near the sun from being used as a Sentinel factory. Sentinels crush Jean's escape pod and she dies, but is resurrected into a cloned body. She is also a member of the Quiet Council, Krakoa's provisional government. Following the events of the 2018 "House of X" storyline, Jean briefly joins the Krakoan incarnation of X-Force, before resigning in protest of Beast's actions in Terra Verde.

== Powers and abilities ==
Jean Grey is an Omega-level mutant, and at her highest and strongest potential was fully merged with the Phoenix Force and with it was able to defeat even Galactus.

=== Empathy ===
Jean is a powerful empath. Due to her abilities she can feel and manipulate the emotions of other people. This is demonstrated in the mental link she shared with Annie Richardson at the time of her death. Jean can connect people's minds to the feelings of others, making them feel the pain they inflicted as if it were their own.

=== Telepathy ===
When her powers first manifested, Jean was unable to cope with her telepathic abilities, forcing Professor Charles Xavier to suppress her access to them altogether. Instead, he chose to train her in the use of her psychokinetic abilities while allowing her telepathy to grow at its natural rate before reintroducing it. When the Professor hid to prepare for the Z'Nox, he reopened Jean's telepathic abilities, which was initially explained by writers as Xavier 'sharing' some of his telepathy with her.

The Women of Marvel: Celebrating Seven Decades Handbook detailed Jean's telepathic abilities:

As [an alpha-level telepath], Jean Grey can detect and read the thoughts of others, project her own thoughts into other's minds, form psychic links with other beings, control others' minds so as to manipulate their physical functions, mentally stun opponents with bolts of pure psionic force, cast near-flawless mental illusions, and project her mind and the minds of others onto the astral plane. At close range, she can manipulate almost any number of minds; however, she can only take full possession of another's mind one at a time and can only do so if she is within that being's physical presence.

Jean is also one of the few telepaths skilled enough to communicate with animals (animals with high intelligence, such as dolphins, dogs, and ravens). As a side effect of her telepathy, she has an eidetic memory. Jean was able, through telepathic therapy with the comatose Jessica Jones, to grant Jessica immunity to the Purple Man's mind control abilities, despite his powers being chemical in nature rather than psychic. When Jean absorbed Psylocke's specialized telepathic powers, her own telepathy was increased to the point that she could physically manifest her telepathy as a psionic firebird whose claws could inflict both physical and mental damage. She briefly developed a psychic shadow form like Psylocke's, with a gold Phoenix emblem over her eye instead of the Crimson Dawn mark possessed by Psylocke. Jean briefly lost her telekinesis to Psylocke during this exchange, but her telekinetic abilities later came back in full and at a far stronger level than before. It was later stated that Jean has been an omega-level telepath.

=== Telekinesis ===
Jean possesses a high level of telekinetic ability that enables her to psionically levitate and rapidly move about all manner of animate and inanimate matter. She can use her telekinetic abilities on herself or others to simulate the power of flight or levitation, stimulate molecules to increase friction, create protective force fields out of psychokinetic energy, or project her telekinetic energy as purely concussive force. The outer limits of her telekinetic power have never been clearly established, though she was capable of lifting approximately fifty tons of rubble with some strain. Jean was later stated to have become an Omega Level Telekinetic.

=== Psychic energy synthesis ===
Jean's younger self, who had been brought from the past into the present by an older Hank McCoy, eventually found an entirely new way to use her powers separate from the Phoenix Force. The teenage Marvel Girl learned she has the ability to harness ambient psychic energy and channel it into powerful blasts of force, which are a combination of both her telepathy and telekinesis. Its potency is such that she can match and overpower the likes of Gladiator, magistrate of the Shi'ar, with relative ease. When using this ability, Jean's whole body glows with pink psychic energy, obscuring her human form.

=== Phoenix Force ===
The relationship between Jean Grey and the Phoenix Force (and the nature of the powers she has) is portrayed in a variety of ways throughout the character's history. In the initial plotline of the Phoenix being a manifestation of Jean's true potential, these powers are considered her own, as part of Claremont and Byrne's desire to create "the first cosmic superheroine". However, since the retcon of the Phoenix as a separate entity from Jean Grey, depictions of these powers vary; these include Jean being one of many hosts to the Phoenix and "borrowing" its "Phoenix powers" during this time, being a unique host to the Phoenix, and being one with the Phoenix. She is later described as the only one currently able to hold the title of "White Phoenix of the Crown" among the many past, present, and future hosts of the Phoenix. Jean — both young and adult versions — is also the only character ever to force the Phoenix against its own cosmic will to do anything while not presently a host. In one instance Jean forcibly ripped the Phoenix out of Emma Frost and imposed its status upon herself. Young Jean was able to keep her psyche anchored in the Phoenix's mind postmortem despite the Phoenix's own efforts to forcibly remove her after it murdered her. Jean then subsequently forced the Phoenix to resurrect her after manipulating the Phoenix's mental landscape against it.

Over the years, Jean's abilities while bonded to the Phoenix Force have fluctuated, but the Women of Marvel: Celebrating Seven Decades Handbook has detailed what Jean is capable of as Phoenix:

While empowered by the Phoenix Force, Grey has total telekinetic control of matter at the molecular level, allowing her to manipulate atomic structures on a universal scale. She can generate any form of energy in seemingly unlimited amounts, as well as absorb energy from sources as great as a supernova or even convert her physical form to pure energy and back again. She can also exist in virtually any environment without harm and create space/time warps to travel through hyperspace or traverse the timestream, and her telepathic abilities are also vastly enhanced. When using her power, the Phoenix Force will manifest itself around Grey in the form of a bird of cosmic flames, the size of the bird varying with the amount of energy she is using. These flames can even manifest in seemingly impossible situations, such as the vacuum of space or underwater. This fire apparently does not require oxygen to burn, and burns so intensely that matter is consumed without by-products such as ash. The cosmic fire is a literal punctuation to the Phoenix's purpose to "burn away what doesn't work", as well as being described as "burning through lies and deception". The Phoenix Force can also resurrect the dead under some conditions, and absorb the life force from other sentient beings to bolster its own.

The Phoenix Force also seems to render its host unaging and, at least in some adaptations, enhances the physical strength of its avatar to superhuman levels; in certain incarnations, Jean, namely while acting as Dark Phoenix, seemed to possess some level of superhuman strength.

==== Resurrection ====
For one reason or another, Jean Grey (both young and old) has, on more than one occasion, been repeatedly resurrected by either the Phoenix or apparently her sheer force of will. In some depictions, these resurrections are immediately after she or whoever she is reviving is killed, while other depictions indicate that a resurrection must occur at a "correct" time, sometimes taking a century. During the height of the Psych Wars, Young Jean was able to forcibly make the Phoenix Force restore her to life, despite the Phoenix's adamant resolve not to do so, completely recreating her body after it had been vaporized. After her body was taken over and completely devoured by a Poison, a small part of Jean's mind survived and, despite itself, was able to infect the whole Poison Hive and destroy it from the inside out, subsequently using nothing but her mind to reconstruct her body. This leaves Jean believing that she may not even be human anymore. This is not the first time Jean was resurrected without the Phoenix; in one instance, she was even able to fully resurrect herself after being clinically dead completely independent of the Phoenix Force.

In their most recent meeting, Jean tells the Phoenix Force that she should have died on the shuttle, and asks it to not resurrect her again.

=== Miscellaneous abilities ===
Jean Grey is a trained pilot and proficient unarmed combatant. She also has some degree of teaching ability, experience as a fashion model, and training in psychology.

== Cultural impact and legacy ==
Maite Molina of ComicsVerse called Jean Grey one of the most "powerful, recognizable, and admirable heroes in Marvel Comics history," writing, "Jean Grey is undoubtedly one of the most iconic characters in comic book history. Her telekinetic abilities prove her to be an incredibly formidable superhero. She has battled some of the most notorious villains in Marvel Comics while fearlessly leading her own team of heroes. With this, she has also explored her own dark side. Epic sagas such as the notable Dark Phoenix Saga depict Jean as an exemplification of evil itself. However, during this trying period, Jean still overcame the corruption within. She showed readers that even heroes can fall into the clutches of darkness and rise above. Most importantly though, Jean Grey is and always has been an incredibly multi-faceted character. She has been a student and a teacher as well as the tether between good and evil." Nigel Mitchell of Comic Book Resources said, "Jean Grey was always a really popular character for readers. Partly, it was because she was one of the most sensitive and intelligent members of the X-Men, the heart of the team. The fact that she was the team's first woman also made her unique, and her beauty was a major source of crushes for the fans. She was also involved in a love triangle between herself, Cyclops, and Wolverine, which drove a lot of emotional storylines. When she became Phoenix, she became the most high-profile female superhero in comics, but the other X-Men creative team Jim Salicrup and John Byrne felt her powers overshadowed the other members and stories. That's why Marvel decided to do something that hadn't really been done before: take one of its greatest superheroes and turn her into one of its greatest supervillains. It was a journey unlike any we'd seen before "The Phoenix Saga" and is compelling to watch." David Caballero of Screen Rant stated, "Jean Grey served no important purpose in the team before The Dark Phoenix Saga, especially during the X-Men's early days. The character existed as a love interest for the group-- every member of the X-Men's original roster had feelings for her at one point-- and a mother figure to provide support and encouragement. As more and more female characters arrived--Storm, Scarlet Witch, and Mystique all debuted throughout the 60s and 70s--it became increasingly complicated to use Jean in any meaningful way. The Dark Phoenix Saga was not only a showcase but, as it turns out, a victory lap for the X-Men's first lady. The storyline took a nearly irrelevant character and elevated it to the apex of importance, turning her into one of Marvel's most overpowered figures in the process."

Elle Collins of ComicsAlliance referred to Jean Grey as one of the "first ladies of Marvel Comics as well as one of the most powerful," saying, "In both the movies and the comics, we have a young Jean who's still learning her full potential as a mutant and a hero, and who's written as a real person with a real personality. That's not to say Jean hasn't accumulated fans over the preceding years; she absolutely has. Whether your first Jean was the Marvel Girl in her green Go Go dress, the Phoenix (who we were later told wasn't Jean, but let's be real it was basically Jean), the hyper competent blue-headsock-wearing Jean of the '90s comic and cartoon, or the cool black leather Jean of the turn of the Century (whether drawn by Frank Quitely or played by Famke Janssen) --- it's hard not to be excited about this next era of the character." Tamara Jude of Sideshow asserted, "As the only female superhero of the X-Men, Jean Grey (initially introduced as Marvel Girl) lacked an impactful role in the comic series. Her biggest storyline involved her love triangle with Cyclops and Wolverine. Claremont wanted to expand her powers with the Phoenix Force and re-brand her as an influential teammate with cosmic abilities. Much like Thor's significant addition to the Avengers, Claremont wanted Jean to hold a similar importance with the X-Men. However, as they wrote the Phoenix Saga, her powers proved too dominant, and the character's presence took over the focus of the comic. Their cosmic hero proved too much for everyone involved." Sara Century of Syfy stated, "When Jean Grey is introduced in X-Men #1 all the way back in late 1963, she asks herself what kind of person she is going to be. The answer to that question doesn't come to her immediately, yet it is true that from her relatively one-dimensional origins eventually sprang a complex personality full of nuance and empathy that has only grown more interesting as time has gone on. From the Phoenix Saga to X-Factor to "Inferno" to the "X-Cutioner"'s to Onslaught to New X-Men to Phoenix: Resurrection and countless alternate realities in between, Jean Grey has truly been beyond and back. Still, many writers have struggled to define her. The complicated, fiercely compassionate Jean Grey has not always translated well to other mediums, and even in comics Jean has been known to experience long dormant periods in which her persona is secondary to other characters. Yet her fanship has remained ever vigilant, because while she is not often cited as people's favorite X-Man, a whole lot of folks relate to her in very specific and incredibly personal ways. Also, it turns out that there's a pretty solid queer allegory in Jean's story. Though a parable about a straight character is not to be mistaken for actual queer representation, it is still worth noting that a lot of Jean Grey's most avid advocates are LGBTQIA people."

Deirdre Kaye of Scary Mommy called Jean Grey a "role model" and a "truly heroic" female character. Chris Arrant of Newsarama ranked Jean Grey's Dark Phoenix persona 1st in their "Marvel's Best Phoenix Force Hosts" list, calling her one of the "X-Men's core characters," while George Marston ranked her 5th in their "Best X-Men Members Of All Time" list. IGN ranked Jean Grey 6th in their "Top 25 X-Men" list, her Dark Phoenix persona 9th in their "Top 100 Comic Book Villains of All Time" list, and 13th in their "Top 100 Comic Book Heroes" list, while Hilary Goldstein and Richard George of IGN said, "Jean Grey is host to the most powerful entity in the universe. One of the original X-Men, Jean has become the symbol (and cruel joke) of death and rebirth among the mutant population. Partnered with the Phoenix Force, Jean has returned to the X-Men on several occasions. However, it's her first death that remains both memorable and significant to X-Men lore. Jean sacrificed herself, choosing to die as a human than live as a God. In a universe where self-worth is almost exclusive judged on power level, Jean held her humanity so dear she was willing to give up everything she loved. The strong-willed redhead is an integral part of the X-Men's legacy."

Gavia Baker-Whitelaw of The Daily Dot ranked Jean Grey 7th in their "Top 33 Female Superheroes Of All Time" list. Jordan St James of Collider ranked Jean Grey 8th in their "10 Most Powerful Marvel Mutants" list, saying, "Jean Grey has gone from sweet-natured powerhouse to planet-destroying villainess to perpetual Lazarus figure." Lance Cartelli of GameSpot ranked Jean Grey 10th in their "50 Most Important Superheroes" list, writing, "She is super important to the X-Men and to all of us." Matthew Aguilar of ComicBook.com wrote, "While Charles Xavier put the X-Men together, there is one of his students who simply dwarfs all others when it comes to power and their effect on mutant history. That honor falls to one of his first students, Jean Grey, a powerful telepath in her own right who became part of the original five X-Men. She would later grow even more powerful though, setting up some of the X-Men's most epic moments into motion. Over the years she's undergone transformations not only in her skills and abilities but also regarding her costumes. She started out in the early days like everyone else, eventually adopting the Marvel Girl suit and persona. It fit her quieter nature at the time, but she would then adopt several looks over the years that changed according to her ever-evolving personality," while Lance Cartelli ranked her 16th in their "50 Most Important Superheroes Ever" list. Darren Franich of Entertainment Weekly ranked Jean Grey 30th in their "Let's Rank Every X-Man Ever" list. The A.V. Club ranked Jean Grey 60th in their "100 Best Marvel Characters" list.

Joe Garza of Slashfilm ranked Jean Grey 1st in their "Most Powerful X-Men Characters" list. Rachel Ulatowski of The Mary Sue ranked Jean Grey 1st in their "10 Most Powerful X-Men of All Time" list. Comics Buyer's Guide ranked Jean Grey 3rd in their "100 Sexiest Women in Comics" list. Joshua Corvington of Sportskeeda ranked Jean Grey 6th in their "10 Most Overpowered Superheroes In The Marvel Universe" list.

Screen Rant included Jean Grey in their "10 Female Marvel Heroes That Should Come To The MCU" list, and ranked her 1st in their "X-Men: The 10 Most Powerful Members Of The Summers Family" list, 5th in their "25 Most Powerful Mutants" list. Comic Book Resources ranked Jean Grey 1st in their "X-Men: The Strongest Members Of The Summers Family" list, 1st in their "X-Men: All Of Marvel's Omega-Level Mutants, Ranked By Power" list, 2nd in their "10 Best Female X-Men Characters" list, 2nd in their "10 Most Attractive Marvel Heroes" list, 3rd in their "10 Strongest Female Villains" list, and 5th in their "10 Bravest Mutants in Marvel Comics" list.

The rapper Jean Grae took her name from the character.

== Other versions ==
=== Time-displaced incarnation ===
==== All-New X-Men ====
In All-New X-Men, present-day Beast goes to the past and brings a younger version of Jean to the present day along with the other original X-Men in hopes of helping the present-day Cyclops to see how far he has fallen. This version has experienced a surge in her abilities due to the trauma of being brought to the future. The time travel also caused her suppressed telepathic powers to awaken much earlier in her life than they were supposed to. She also has a habit of reading people's minds without their permission, to the great frustration of her team. During the Battle of the Atom crossover, a future version of this Jean Grey, who had never returned to the past and whose powers had grown beyond her control, would return to the present as Xorn, a member of the future Brotherhood of Mutants. Xorn died during the battle, but in the process the X-Men also found out that there is something preventing the All-New X-Men from returning to the past. During this timeline, she reads the mind of current Beast, who regrets never admitting his feelings for her, so confronts younger Beast and gives him a kiss, which creates problems with the younger Cyclops. She and her team also leave the Jean Grey School for mutants and go to Cyclops's school, where she forms a reluctant friendship with Emma Frost as she trains her psychic abilities.

Jean is later kidnapped by the Shi'ar and placed on trial for the destruction done by the Phoenix Force years earlier in a 2014 crossover storyline The Trial of Jean Grey. The All-New X-Men team up with the Guardians of the Galaxy to rescue Jean from the Shi'ar homeworld, but Jean awakens a new power that she never had, in which she is able to absorb massive amounts of psionic energy from others and combine her telepathy and telekinesis, which she used to defeat the powerful Gladiator, leader of the Shi'ar.

While searching for new mutants, Jean and the All-New X-Men get teleported into the Ultimate Marvel universe. She teams up with Spider-Man (Miles Morales) to rescue Beast, who has been trapped by the local Doctor Doom. Before she is teleported back she gives Miles Morales a kiss. Upon their return to Earth-616, she and the All-New X-Men team up with the Guardians of the Galaxy a second time in search of The Black Vortex.

Following the reconstruction of reality after the Battleworld crisis, Jean has parted ways from the rest of the time-displaced X-Men as she attempts to find her own life in the present by living a normal civilian life in College until Storm recruits her to join her new team of X-Men to help protect mutants from Terrigen. She mentions having broken up with Hank McCoy, considering him to be more of a brother. After the X-Men go to war against the Inhumans to destroy the Terrigen, Jean leaves Storm's team and attempts to return to her original timeline along with the rest of the time-displaced X-Men but realizes that they're not from the 616 timeline, leaving them stranded on Earth 616 with no idea which timeline they are from. With this new knowledge that they are from an unknown alternate timeline, Jean becomes the time-displaced X-Men's new leader and they quit the X-Men in hopes of finding their place in the current world.

Jean ends up approached by Magneto, who offers her and her team to join him in preserving Xavier's dream by defeating those who oppose it. Jean accepts and her team joins him, but in secret they train themselves in case Magneto ever reverts to his villainous roots to kill them.

As part of the Marvel's ResurrXion event, Jean Grey received her first-ever solo series. While on a solo mission against the Wrecking Crew, Jean receives a vision that the Phoenix Force is returning to Earth. She goes to the rest of the X-Men to warn them about her vision but as there have not been any Phoenix sightings since the X-Men went to war against the Avengers to decide the fate of the Phoenix, she has a hard time getting Beast, Captain Marvel, and Kitty Pryde to accept that her vision was real even though they assure her that if the Phoenix ever does return then the X-Men and Avengers will come together and do all they can to stop it. Jean feels even less taken seriously when Beast begins examining her for signs of delusional hallucinations. Jean then meets with other former Phoenix hosts Colossus, Magik, Rachel Summers, Hope Summers and Quentin Quire, where the latter uses his powers to show her how the aftereffects of bonding with the Phoenix Force has individually affected each of them. A meeting with Namor helps Jean come to the conclusion that she can refuse the Phoenix and even possibly defeat it. After meeting with Thor and training with Psylocke, Jean learns how to create telekinetic weapons to help with her impending battle against the Phoenix.

Jean ends up sent back in time for unknown reasons and ends up meeting that timeline's Jean Grey shortly after she first becomes Phoenix. Time-displaced Jean attempts to ask Phoenix questions about the Phoenix Force but she dodges Jean's questions. Instead Phoenix takes Jean for a night out and shows off her powers. After witnessing Phoenix use her cosmic powers to prevent Galactus from consuming a defenseless planet, Jean contemplates warning Phoenix of her fate until an encounter with Uatu stops her from doing so. The Watcher commends Jean and tells her that choosing to not change her future means that her ultimate fate is in her own hands whether or not she ends up hosting the Phoenix Force back in her present. As Jean returns to her present, Phoenix cryptically states that they will meet again.

This was done to resurrect the adult Jean Grey, which the Phoenix considers its one true host. However, after dying, the younger Jean found herself somehow in the White Hot Room despite not being a Phoenix host. Angry, the Phoenix attempted to destroy her using mental manifestations of its past hosts, created from pieces of their life forces left in the Room. Jean realized that she could control the White Hot Room against the Phoenix wishes and commanded the cosmic entity to resurrect her, which it did so in order to get rid of her. After returning to Madripoor, she was approached by her resurrected older Earth-616 counterpart, much to her surprise.

=== Age of Apocalypse ===
In the Age of Apocalypse storyline, Jean is a student of Magneto. She is forced to suppress her telepathic powers in order to escape from the Shadow King's attacks. She eventually falls in love with fellow student, Weapon X. Jean is later kidnapped by Mr. Sinister, who offers her a place among his team. She refuses, and is sent to Sinister's breeding pens. Weapon X rescues her, but not before Sinister extracted her DNA and combined it with that of Cyclops to engineer the perfect mutant, X-Man. Weapon X, and Jean leave the X-Men and join forces with the Human High Council. She learns of a plan to drop nuclear bombs on the United States to kill Apocalypse. She confronts Weapon X, then leaves him to try to stop the attack with the aid of Cyclops. She is apparently killed at the hands of Cyclops' brother, Havok, before she can hold back the nuclear bombs with her telekinesis.

In the tenth-anniversary limited series, it is revealed that Jean was the one that stopped the nuclear attack from the Human High Council with the last of her powers. She was also "resurrected" by Sinister and began displaying Phoenix Force powers, known in this reality as "Mutant Alpha" abilities. Jean does not remember her old life at first, so Sinister manipulated her to create a new team to fight the X-Men, the Sinister Six. During the fight between the two teams, Logan is able to connect emotionally with Jean. She turns on Sinister and incinerates him. Jean and Logan reunite, and she becomes leader of the X-Men at Magneto's behest.

=== Ultimate Marvel ===
In the Ultimate Marvel continuity, Jean Grey is a responsible, but extroverted young woman; scathingly sarcastic and a bit of a tease, and she secretly reads other people's minds, particularly the other members of the X-Men. Early in the series, she has very short, cropped hair and dresses in punkish clothes. As she matures through both her studies and her role as an X-Man, she gradually shifts to more conservative outfits and grows out her hair to match the character's classic style. She has a brief affair with Wolverine, but when Wolverine reveals he was sent to kill Professor X, Jean is angry and ends the relationship. She later begins to date Cyclops although she is occasionally frustrated by his shyness. Xavier found Jean Grey while she was in a mental hospital, having problems controlling her telepathy and having troublesome visions of a "Phoenix raptor". It is established at the start of the series that her age is 19 and was Xavier's second student after Cyclops.

Jean is initially haunted by visions and hallucinations of the Phoenix, whose powers manifest when she is angered. When Apocalypse places Xavier on the brink of death and the Phoenix Force responds, physically manifesting herself and merging with Jean to fight Apocalypse. Using her unimaginable powers, she brings Apocalypse to his knees and melts his armor. Having fully merged with the Phoenix, Jean reverts recent history, allowing the X-Men to remember. She then travels across the universe, causing war and suicide among different races. When she reaches her destination, the Silver Surfer arrives to warn her but she pushes on to find Heaven.

Following the events of Requiem, most of the X-Men are killed. Jean then moves to Baltimore, changing her hair color to black and assuming the identity of Karen Grant. She takes a nondescript job managing a store at the Cherry Square Shopping Center, where her boyfriend Dave works as a security guard. Despite having only worked at the mall for four months, Jean uses her telepathy to alter the memories of her coworkers so that they believe she has worked there for three years.

=== X-Men Forever ===
In Chris Claremont's X-Men Forever, Jean is in nearly all respects the same character as the mainline Marvel Universe character. Her flirtations with Logan are explored more in-depth in the first few issues of the title, and she confesses shortly after Logan's death that she loved him. She and Scott both recognize their romantic relationship is over, due to the revelations. Claremont has also shown that Jean still possesses the Phoenix Force, and has manifested it twice, once in the first issue to subdue Fabian Cortez after he has apparently killed Logan and Kitty Pryde, and again to attack Storm in retaliation for her killing of Logan. She has, recently, been acknowledged as the field leader of the team during Cyclops' leave of absence. Jean continues to demonstrate signs of the Phoenix Force and wears a new blue and gold X-Men uniform which is cut in a similar style to her old Phoenix costume. After dealing with Logan's loss Jean began a relationship with the Beast but it ended after he sacrificed himself. With Cyclops's return, Jean began to share leadership of the X-Men with him and eventually she would be reunited with the true Storm. In the finale of the series, it is hinted that she and Scott resume their relationship.

== In other media ==
=== Television ===
Jean Grey as the Phoenix in X-Men: The Animated Series

Jean Grey had a few brief appearances in animated television series from the 1960s through the 1980s. She debuted as Marvel Girl in the "Sub-Mariner" segment of The Marvel Super Heroes (1966), where this version was a member of the Allies for Peace. She later made another brief appearance in the Spider-Man and His Amazing Friends (1981–1983) episode "The Origin of Iceman" in a flashback. Jean Grey appears as one of the lead characters in X-Men: The Animated Series (1992–1997) voiced by Catherine Disher primarily and by Jennifer Dale as the Phoenix / Dark Phoenix. The character later appears in the revival X-Men '97 (2024–present) voiced by Jennifer Hale.

Jean Grey also appeared in Spider-Man: The Animated Series (1994–1998) voiced again by Disher. She subsequently appeared in X-Men: Evolution (2000–2003) voiced by Venus Terzo, and later in Wolverine and the X-Men (2009) voiced by Hale. The character later appeared in the motion comic series Astonishing X-Men, voiced by Eva Kaminsky. During the late 2000s and early 2010s, the character made few brief appearances, including The Super Hero Squad Show (2009–2011) episode "Mysterious Mayhem at Mutant High!" voiced by Hynden Walch. She then appeared in Marvel Anime: X-Men voiced by Yurika Hino in Japanese and again by Hale in English. Additionally, she appeared in the Iron Man: Armored Adventures (2009–2012) episode "The X-Factor" voiced again by Terzo.

=== Film ===
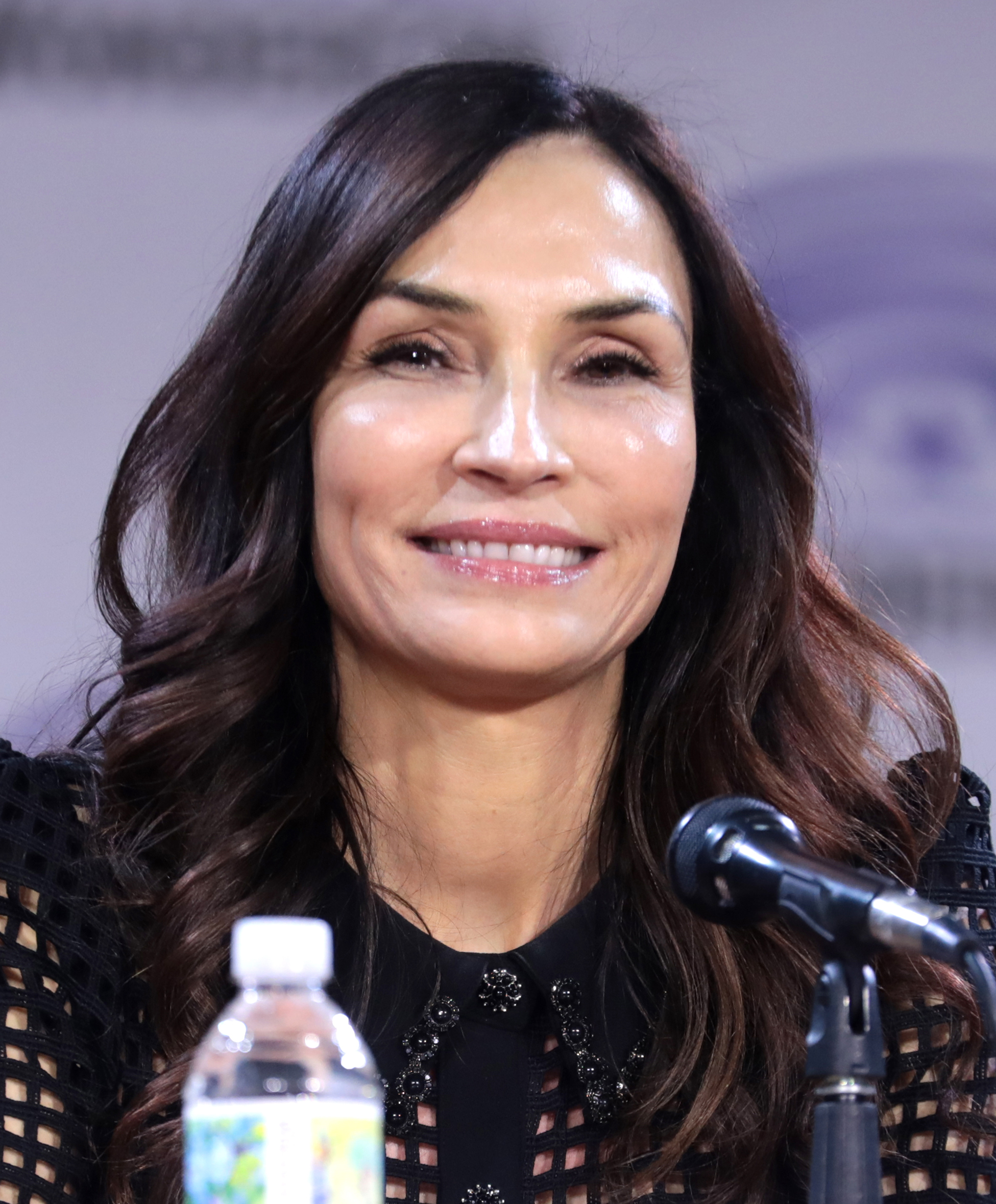
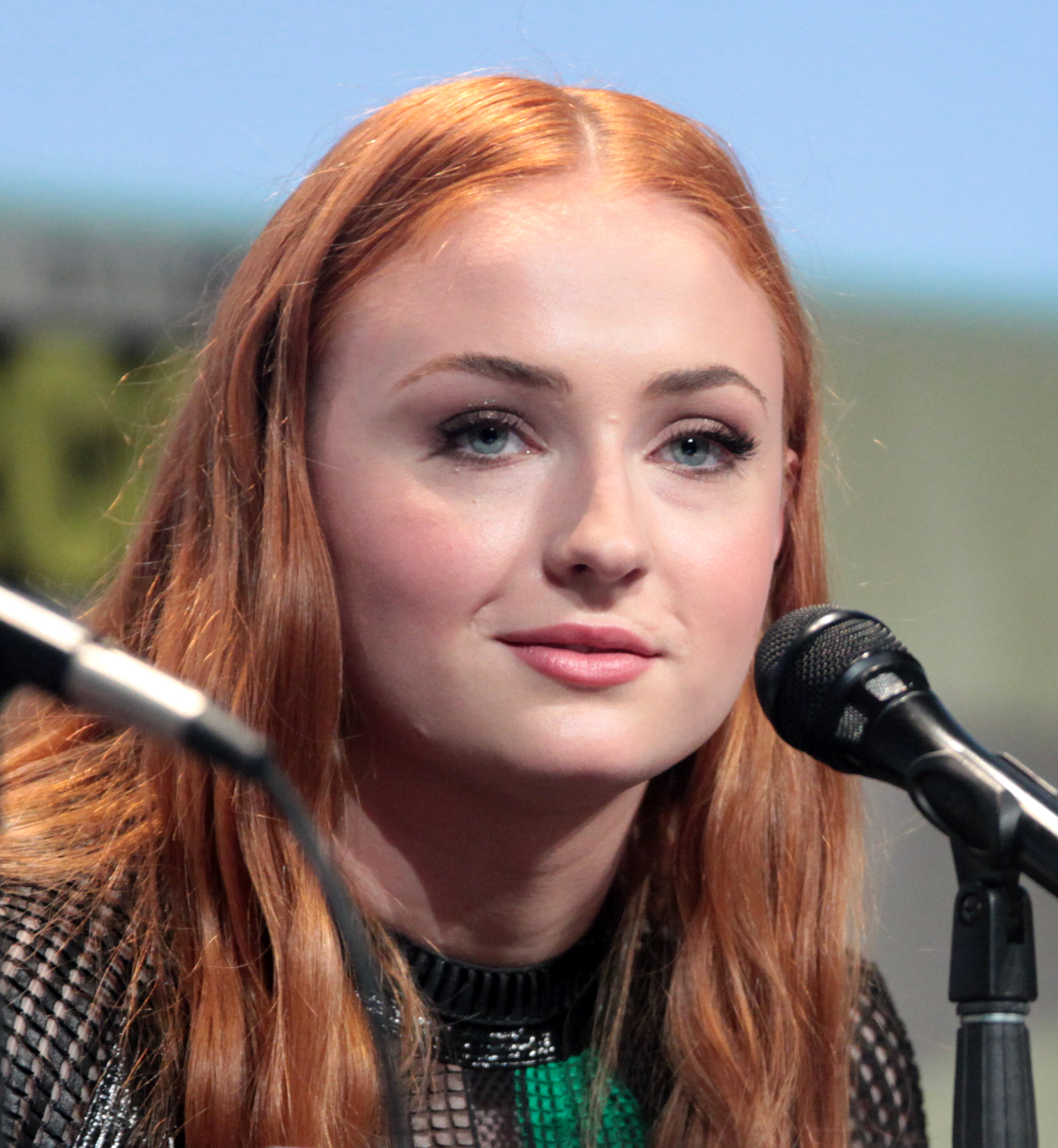
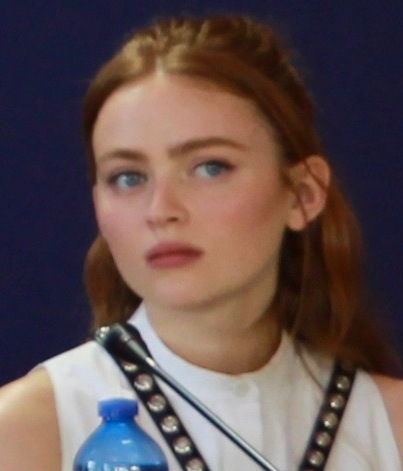
Famke Janssen (left, pictured in 2023) portrayed Jean Grey in the X-Men original trilogy (2000–2006). Sophie Turner (center, pictured in 2015) portrayed a younger version of the character in prequel films (2016–2019). Sadie Sink (right, pictured in 2022) portrays the character in the Marvel Cinematic Universe.

In film, Jean Grey has appeared in 20th Century Fox's X-Men film series (2000–2019) and the Marvel Cinematic Universe (MCU) franchise produced by Marvel Studios (2026-present).

Jean Grey appears in seven of Fox's X-Men films. She is initially portrayed by Famke Janssen in X-Men (2000), X2 (2003), X-Men: The Last Stand (2006), and The Wolverine (2013), along with a cameo appearance in X-Men: Days of Future Past (2014), while Sophie Turner portrays a younger version of Jean in the films X-Men: Apocalypse (2016) and Dark Phoenix (2019). Her portrayal in the franchise has been described as a plot device rather than a fully realized character.

Sadie Sink portrays Jean Grey in the MCU. The character debuts in Spider-Man: Brand New Day (2026), and is slated to return in Avengers: Secret Wars (2027) and the untitled X-Men film (2028).

=== Video games ===
Jean Grey has appeared in numerous video games over the decades, including X-Men II: The Fall of the Mutants. The character also appears in Marvel: Ultimate Alliance voiced by Sarah Waits, and in X-Men: The Official Game voiced by Katherine Morgan.

Jean Grey / Phoenix / Dark Phoenix appears as a playable character in X-Men Legends II: Rise of Apocalypse voiced by Leigh-Allyn Baker, in Marvel vs. Capcom 3: Fate of Two Worlds voiced by Hale, and in Marvel: Ultimate Alliance 2 voiced by Molly Hagan. Additionally, her appearances from the 1990s as drawn by Jim Lee, X-Men: Phoenix – Endsong and New X-Men appear as alternate skins. Jean Grey appears as Marvel Girl and Phoenix as a playable character in Marvel Super Hero Squad Online voiced by Tara Strong and Laura Bailey respectively. As a downloadable playable character, the character appears in Marvel Heroes voiced by April Stewart, and in Marvel Ultimate Alliance 3: The Black Order voiced by Hale.

Jean Grey / Phoenix appears as a playable character in Fortnite Battle Royale, as well as in Marvel Avengers: Battle for Earth and in Lego Marvel Super Heroes, both voiced by Bailey. Additionally, the character appears in Marvel Rivals voiced by Crystal Lee. She also appears as a playable character in Marvel Cosmic Invasion voiced by Hale. The character also appears as an unvoiced playable character in Marvel: Future Fight, in Marvel Puzzle Quest, and in Marvel Super War. Jean Grey appears in Marvel's Wolverine, voiced by Krizia Bajos.

=== Miscellaneous ===
Jean Grey has been featured in several Marvel Legends action figure lines. The character appears in the novel X-Men: The Chaos Engine Trilogy, written by Steven A. Roman. This version is a member of an X-Men detachment who were inside the Starlight Citadel when Doctor Doom, Magneto, and the Red Skull separately obtained a flawed Cosmic Cube and rewrote reality to their liking. Due to the Citadel protecting them from Doom's changes, Grey and the X-Men work to restore their original reality. Though Grey becomes a follower of Magneto and the Red Skull amidst their changes, the original gains control of her counterpart in the latter's reality before rejoining the X-Men in stopping Doom and the Red Skull. The character serves as inspiration for The Refrigerator Monologues character Julia Ash.

== Bibliography ==
- Brownfield, Troy (2025). X-Men for Dummies. Marvel. ISBN 978-1-394-36274-5.
- Cebulski, C.B., ed. (2024). Marvel Encyclopedia: New Edition. DK. ISBN 978-0-5938-4611-7.
- Deman, J. Andrew (2023). The Claremont Run: Subverting Gender in the X-Men. University of Texas Press. ISBN 978-1-4773-3075-3.
- Fawaz, Ramzi (2016). The New Mutants: Superheroes and the Radical Imagination of American Comics. New York University Press. pp. 200–234.
- Ridout, Cefn, ed. (2022). Marvel Year by Year: A Visual History: New Edition. DK. ISBN 978-0-7440-5451-4.
- Saunders, Ben, ed. (2023). X-Men. Penguin Classics. ISBN 978-0-14-313576-0.
- Wolk, Douglas (2021). All of the Marvels: A Journey to the Ends of the Biggest Story Ever Told. Penguin Press. ISBN 978-0-7352-2216-8.
