= Paul Smith (comics) =

Comic book artist from the United States

- Born: September 4, 1953 (age 73) Kansas City, Missouri, U.S.
- Areas: Penciller, Inker
- Notable works: Uncanny X-Men; Doctor Strange; Leave It to Chance

Paul Martin Smith (born September 4, 1953) is an American comic book artist, known for his work on The Uncanny X-Men, X-Factor, American Flagg!, Nexus, GrimJack and his creator-owned book, Leave It to Chance.

During his 1983 run on The Uncanny X-Men, Smith's work on issue 173 of that series would prove influential in two ways: It featured the debut of the punk look for the X-Men leader Storm, and Smith's cover of that issue would influence both a latter comic book cover and a best-selling poster and retailer standee by artist Arthur Adams.

== Early life ==
Smith was born in Kansas City, Missouri, but only lived there three days. His father was a U.S. Naval aviator, and the family moved several times during his childhood. As a young comics fan, Smith particularly admired the work of Steve Ditko on The Amazing Spider-Man and Neal Adams on Batman.

== Career ==
Smith had no formal art training aside from some courses in airbrushing. He began his career as an animation artist on Ralph Bakshi's The Lord of the Rings. In the early 1980s, he filled in on a variety of Marvel Comics titles, including Marvel Fanfare #4, cover dated September 1982, doing the final chapter of an X-Men story. He became the regular artist on Doctor Strange starting with issue #56, cover dated December 1982, but left after just two issues so that he could work on The Uncanny X-Men.

Marvel entered into an agreement with Smith for him to take over the art duties from Dave Cockrum on The Uncanny X-Men, then the biggest selling US comics series, for one year. Smith had emigrated to the East Coast with dreams of drawing Spider-Man and Conan, and realized that his performance on X-Men would determine the future of his career. During his run on the series, which lasted from issue #165 – #175, he designed the punk look, complete with black leather outfit and mohawk, for the X-Men leader Storm that debuted in Uncanny X-Men #173 (October 1983). The change in appearance was inspired by the decision of colleague Walt Simonson to shave off his beard and mustache while on vacation with his wife, X-Men editor Louise Simonson. Upon their return, Simonson's daughter, Julie, upset at her father's new appearance, ran from the room, a reaction that would be mirrored in X-Man Kitty Pryde's reaction to Storm's new appearance. When the book's editors decided to change Storm's appearance, Smith submitted a number of designs to them, explaining in a 2008 interview:

I did a number of portraits, all quite lovely and feminine. As a joke, I included a shot of her as Mr. T. You know, the kind of shot where they HAVE to go the other way. Weezie [X-Men editor Louise Simonson]'s response? 'They’re going to hang us whichever way we go. Let's commit the murder.' I argued it was a joke and a monstrously bad idea but, given my departure following 175 was set prior to beginning my run, my vote didn’t count. So I did what I could with what I had left... So we went with the Mohawk ...But once you get into the whole leather and stud thing it was a bad joke that got way out of hand.

Smith's cover for issue #173 would prove influential. When editing the 1985 anthology book Heroes for Hope, which was intended to benefit famine relief in Africa, editor Ann Nocenti asked artist Arthur Adams to pattern his cover of that book after Smith's illustration. This in turn prompted Bob Budiansky to have Adams produce a Wolverine poster with the same type of pose. The image, inked by Terry Austin, became not only a bestselling poster, but an iconic life-size standee for comics shops. Smith's splash page for issue #168, of Kitty Pryde in a ski jacket sharply turning towards the reader while yelling, "Professor Xavier is a jerk!", has been the subject of numerous homages and imitations.

Smith's brief run on X-Men was distinguished by its smooth rendering and minimum of line, and most of it was later reprinted in the From the Ashes trade paperback. Eventually his entire X-Men run was reprinted in Essential X-Men Vol. 4. He bookended the Marvel Fanfare series, pencilling a short Daredevil story in issue #1, and writing, drawing and lettering a sequel to that Daredevil tale in #60, the final issue of the book. Smith had a brief stint on the X-Men spin-off X-Factor. Over the subsequent years Smith would return numerous times to work on various books of the X-Men franchise.

A few months after leaving The Uncanny X-Men, Smith returned as the regular artist on Doctor Strange. He worked on that series from #65 to #73, drawing seven of those issues. He also drew the X-Men and Alpha Flight limited series during the final months of this run. Both issues of the series were 48 pages long and featured wraparound covers drawn by Smith. He was scheduled to pencil a Spider-Man graphic novel, a collaboration with Bob Layton, once his run on Doctor Strange concluded, but it was never completed.

His other works include The Golden Age and the young adults comic Leave It to Chance, both collaborations with writer James Robinson. Smith has also contributed art to a number of First Comics titles including American Flagg!, Nexus, and GrimJack.

In 2005 Smith drew the Kitty Pryde: Shadow and Flame limited series written by Akira Yoshida.

== Selected interior comics work ==
- Amazing High Adventure 2 (Marvel Comics)
- American Flagg! 47, 48 (First Comics)
- Batman Annual 9 (DC Comics)
- Bizarre Adventures 34 (Marvel Comics)
- Buck Rogers 1 (TSR)
- Code Name: Danger 3
- Doctor Strange 54, 56, 65, 66, 68, 69, 71–73 (Marvel Comics)
- The Falcon 1 (Marvel Comics)
- The Golden Age 1–4 (DC Comics)
- GrimJack 24 (First Comics)
- Hero Alliance Annual 1 (Innovation Publishing)
- Howard the Duck 32 (Marvel Comics)
- Iron Lantern 1 (Amalgam Comics)
- Iron Man 159, 245, Annual 10 (Marvel Comics)
- Leave It To Chance 1–13 (Image Comics)
- Magnus Robot Fighter Yearbook 1 (Valiant Comics)
- Marvels Comics Fantastic Four 1 (Marvel Comics)
- Marvel Fanfare 1, 4, 32, 45, 60 (Marvel Comics)
- Nexus 37-38, 43-44, 49, 51–55
- The Spirit 17–21 (DC Comics)
- Starman 69 (DC Comics)
- Sun Runners 2–4 (Mike Mahogany back up strip only) (Eclipse Comics)
- Uncanny X-Men 165–170, 172–175, 278 (Marvel Comics)
- Wild Times; Grifter 1 (WildStorm)
- X-Factor 43–46, 48, 49 (Marvel Comics)
- X-Men and Alpha Flight 1, 2 (Marvel Comics)
- X-Men Forever 6, 10 (Marvel Comics)

Preceded by Dave Cockrum	Uncanny X-Men artist 1982–1983	Succeeded by John Romita, Jr.
