= From the Ashes (2024 film) =

2024 Saudi Arabian film

- Directed by: Khalid Fahad
- Produced by: Faisal Baltyuor
- Starring: Shaima Al Tayeb; Wafa Muhamad; Hamss Bandar
- Distributed by: Netflix
- Release date: January 2024
- Country: Saudi Arabia
- Language: Arabic

From the Ashes is a 2024 Saudi Arabian thriller film directed by Khalid Fahad and produced by Faisal Baltyuor, a former head of the Saudi Film Council. Released on Netflix in January 2024, it follows pupils and staff at a rural girls' school after a fatal fire, and turns into a murder mystery when a student is found dead.

The film reached the Netflix non-English top ten in 37 countries and was described by The National as Saudi Arabia's biggest global hit to that point. A sequel, From the Ashes: The Pit, was released in January 2026.

== Plot ==
The film opens at a rural Saudi high school, where teenage girls face judgement and pressure from teachers and parents. A fire breaks out within the first half-hour. When one pupil is found dead in a closet, the story becomes an investigation into who locked her in as the fire spread.

== Production ==
Fahad has said the film was inspired by a 2002 fire at a girls' school in Makkah in which 15 pupils died, though the writers built an original story rather than retelling the event. He described the film as being less about the fire than about "the relationship between the schoolgirls and the teachers and the parents", and said it deals with bullying, parental pressure and the consequences of schools labelling pupils as good or bad.

Experienced actresses were cast as the teachers, while the production held five to six days of auditions to find newcomers for the pupils. Fahad drew on his experience directing young performers on his first feature, Valley Road. He said of the wider industry that it was "a great time to be a Saudi filmmaker", because "everything is open, everything is new".

== Release and reception ==
From the Ashes was released on Netflix in January 2024. Within three weeks it had entered the service's weekly non-English top ten films in 37 countries across five continents, including Mexico and much of Central and South America, as well as Jamaica, Luxembourg, Spain, Egypt, Nigeria, and Trinidad and Tobago. By 4 February 2024 it had recorded 7.6 million views and 11.6 million hours viewed.

Fahad attributed the response to international interest in Saudi society, saying that "people around the world want to see Saudi culture" and that "these stories come from our hidden culture".

Reviewing the film for The National, the critic gave it three stars out of five, describing it as working at once as "a murder mystery, a high school melodrama, a thriller and at times a teen comedy", and singling out Shaima Al Tayeb's performance as the school principal while noting Wafa Muhamad and Hamss Bandar as emerging talents.

== Sequel ==
A follow-up, From the Ashes: The Pit, directed by Abdullah Bamajbour, was released on Netflix on 22 January 2026. It follows three former friends trapped in a pit after a schoolyard collapse, and stars Moudi Abdullah, Aseel Morya, Aseel Seraj and Wafa Al Wafi.
