= Patriot (Marvel Comics) =

Comic book superhero

- Rayshaun Lucas / Patriot. Textless cover of Secret Empire: Brave New World vol 1 #2 (June 2017). Art by Paulo Siqueira.

Publication information
- Publisher: Marvel Comics
- First appearance: Jeffrey Mace: Human Torch Comics #4 (March 1941); Elijah "Eli" Bradley: Young Avengers #1 (April 2005); Rayshaun Lucas: Captain America: Sam Wilson #18 (January 2017)
- Created by: Mace: Ray Gill; George Mandel; Bradley: Allan Heinberg; Jim Cheung; Lucas: Nick Spencer; Daniel Acuña

In-story information
- Alter ego: Jeffrey Mace; Elijah "Eli" Bradley; Rayshaun Lucas
- Species: Human mutate
- Team affiliations: Secret Avengers; Young Avengers; Champions
- Notable aliases: Lieutenant America; Patriot
- Abilities: Superhuman strength, speed, agility, stamina, senses, and endurance; Regenerative healing factor; Carries triangular shield and metallic throwing stars

Patriot is the name of several superheroes appearing in American comic books published by Marvel Comics. The first incarnation of Patriot, Jeffrey Mace, first appeared in Human Torch Comics #4 (March 1941). The second incarnation, Eli Bradley, debuted in Young Avengers #1 (April 2005). The third incarnation, Rayshaun Lucas, made his first appearance in Captain America: Sam Wilson #18 (January 2017).

== Fictional character biography ==
=== Jeffrey Mace ===
The first Patriot is Jeffrey Mace. Created by writer Ray Gill and artist Bill Everett, the character debuted in The Human Torch # 4 (Spring 1941; numbered #3 on cover).

Jeffrey Mace was a reporter who became a costumed adventurer after seeing Steve Rogers / Captain America in action. He was later a member of the World War II superhero team the Liberty Legion. The Patriot himself later took on the mantle of Captain America.

=== Eli Bradley ===
The second Patriot is Eli Bradley. Created by writer Allan Heinberg and artist Jim Cheung, the character debuted in Young Avengers #1 (April 2005).

Eli Bradley is the grandson of Isaiah Bradley, who gained powers similar to Captain America's as part of experimentation on African-American men in an attempt to reproduce the super-soldier serum that empowered Steve Rogers. Eli was conceived before Isaiah's involvement with the experiment and did not inherit his powers.

When Iron Lad begins searching for the next generation of Avengers, he comes to the Bradley household in search of Isaiah's son, Josiah. However, Josiah had been missing for several months, and Iron Lad encounters Eli instead. Eli claims to have gained superpowers through an emergency blood transfusion from his grandfather, but this was untrue. He gained his powers artificially with Mutant Growth Hormone (MGH), an illegal street drug that briefly provides him superhuman abilities. Writer Allan Heinberg stated that Bradley's drug usage is based on his own history:

Since I had personally had a recent (and regrettable) experience with steroids, steroid use was something I wanted to write about. For better or worse, Eli's race was never a factor in those storytelling decisions, and I hope that by the end of this arc, Eli's story will be an inspiring one to all our readers.

Patriot becomes a founding member of the Young Avengers. He has an adversarial relationship with teammate Hawkeye, who nonetheless gave him Captain America's original star-spangled triangular shield.

When the truth about Eli's powers is revealed, Eli quits the Young Avengers. He returns after Hulkling is kidnapped by the Super-Skrull; the other Young Avengers convince him that he is the only one capable of leading the team, even without powers. Patriot is later gravely wounded by a Kree warrior after taking a blast meant for Captain America. He receives a blood transfusion from his grandfather, Isaiah, which granted him the abilities afforded by the Super-Soldier Serum.

Eli joins Captain America's Secret Avengers during the 2006 - 2007 "Civil War" storyline. Patriot leads his team to assist the Runaways after they were attacked by the government. The Young Avengers and the Runaways worked together when two of their members were captured, and the Runaways decided to stay out of the mix in the war. Patriot managed to keep most of his team together, but Stature decided to join Iron Man's side.

Eli later seeks out the Winter Soldier, whom he had earlier met during the events of "Civil War", to discuss the nature of patriotism at a time when he disagrees with the Superhero Registration Act, and much of the way America is being governed. The two have a heartfelt conversation about America as an idea and about the original Patriot, Jeffrey Mace.

During the 2008 "Secret Invasion" storyline, Eli and the other Young Avengers are the first team to respond to the Skrull invasion of Manhattan. Despite their efforts and the aid of the Initiative cadets, they are all defeated. However, they are saved by the timely arrival of Nick Fury and the Secret Warriors and help Earth's heroes defeat the Skrull invaders.

During the 2008 - 2009 "Dark Reign" storyline, Eli is outraged when Norman Osborn forms his "official" team of Avengers and even more so when he announces a new team of Young Avengers. Eli's Young Avengers confront the latter and demand that they either join the first team of Young Avengers, or find another name for themselves. Near the end of the issue, Hawkeye (Kate Bishop) admits her love for Eli after he breaks his hand, to which he responds 'I may break my hand everyday', making their relationship clear after a few months of dating.

Eli appears alongside the other Young Avengers in Avengers: Children's Crusade. He ultimately leaves the group at the end of the story, feeling guilty for preventing the Scarlet Witch from undoing the near-extinction of mutantkind that she had previously caused in the 2005 "Decimation" storyline.

=== Young Avengers ===
Throughout Young Avengers Vol. 2, written by Kieron Gillen, and launched in January 2013 as part of the Marvel Now! rebranding line, the titular team is haunted by a new multiversal Patriot, who captures Speed. Prodigy believes that this Patriot is the transformed version of one of the Young Avengers from the future and traveled backwards in time to ensure that his future comes to pass. Guessing that Patriot may be himself, Prodigy kisses him, causing Patriot to vanish and Speed to reappear in his place.

=== Rayshaun Lucas ===
The third Patriot is Rayshaun Lucas. Created by writer Nick Spencer and artist Daniel Acuña, the character debuted in Captain America: Sam Wilson #18 (January 2017).

In March 2017, Marvel Comics announced a new superhero using the codename Patriot would be introduced in the 2017 "Secret Empire" storyline.

Rayshaun Lucas is a teen activist who idolizes Sam Wilson. Lucas is living in Brooklyn with his mother when Wilson releases footage showing that Rage has been wrongfully accused of burglary and savagely beaten by the Americops. Following Rage's unjust conviction, Lucas paints his face to resemble Rage's mask and participates in riots in New York City. After Wilson resigns as Captain America, Lucas removes his facepaint and begins designing a costume that he calls the Patriot.

After discovering Lucas's conceptual designs for the Patriot suit, Black Widow gives the designs to an A.I. based on Tony Stark, who in turn builds the suit. After trying to stop a group of bullies from taking an iPad from a little girl, Lucas gets beaten. Afterwards, the Tony Stark A.I. calls Lucas and gives him the suit that he made for him, explaining that Lucas gave him hope again and that the suit is a way to thank him for that. Lucas trains with an A.I. version of the Black Widow that the Tony Stark A.I. made and eventually confronts the bullies while he wears the suit and defeats them, giving the girl her iPad back. Miles Morales and Joaquin Torres tell Lucas that they heard about him and that they are looking forward to having him on their team.

== Powers and abilities ==
While secretly using his specially concocted MGH formula, Eli Bradley possesses agility, strength, speed, endurance, and reaction-time superior to that of normal Super-Soldiers like his grandfather and Captain America, but at a heavy physical and mental cost. After receiving a blood transfusion from his grandfather, Eli develops genuine Super-Soldier abilities, which include superhuman strength, stamina, speed, reflexes, agility, and senses. He also possesses a degree of resistance to injury that makes his skin bulletproof, as well as a healing factor. In Civil War #2, Eli appears to possess the full physical abilities of a Super-Soldier. He is able to outrun a helicopter, shrug off a hail of tranquilizer darts, jump 100 feet through the air, and survive a massive explosion. The Patriot carries a replica of Captain America's shield, similar to the unpainted one originally carried into battle by his grandfather Isaiah. He also carries white metallic throwing stars patterned after those on the American flag.

Rayshaun Lucas is an expert at hand-to-hand combat ever since he trained with an A.I. version of Black Widow. He also wields a shield created by the Tony Stark A.I. that triples as a glider and a drone.

== Other versions ==
=== Exiles: Days of Then and Now ===
An alternate version of Patriot appears in Exiles: Days of Then and Now. He was seen as a member of Quentin Quire's surviving team of heroes fighting against the Annihilation Wave.

=== Avengers: The Children's Crusade ===
An alternate version of Patriot appears in Avengers: The Children's Crusade. Eli Bradley briefly appears in a possible future timeline as part of a new group of Avengers seen in the Children's Crusade event. By this time, he has succeeded Steve Rogers to become the new Captain America and fights crime alongside his wife Samantha, the new Falcon. Their son Steve is also a member of the Avengers as the new Bucky.

== In other media ==
=== Television ===
The Rayshaun Lucas incarnation of Patriot appears in the Marvel Rising franchise, voiced by Kamil McFadden. This version is a S.H.I.E.L.D. agent partnered with Daisy Johnson. He later becomes a member of the Secret Warriors.

=== Marvel Cinematic Universe ===
Several incarnations of Patriot appear in media set in the Marvel Cinematic Universe (MCU).

- Jeffrey Mace appears in Agents of S.H.I.E.L.D. and its companion web series Agents of S.H.I.E.L.D.: Slingshot, portrayed by Jason O'Mara. This version is an ex-journalist who received a serum that enhances his strength and durability and is appointed the public face and new director of S.H.I.E.L.D. following the events of the third season, the Sokovia Accords, and the public outlawing of Steve Rogers in the film Captain America: Civil War.
- Eli Bradley was intended to appear in Black Panther, but his scenes were removed during production.
- Eli Bradley appears in The Falcon and the Winter Soldier, portrayed by Elijah Richardson. This version is a teenager who lives with his grandfather, Isaiah Bradley in Baltimore, Maryland.

=== Video games ===
- The Eli Bradley incarnation of Patriot appears as a boss in Marvel Ultimate Alliance 2, voiced by Ogie Banks. This version supports Captain America in opposing the Registration Acts.
- The Rayshaun Lucas incarnation of Patriot appears as a playable character in Marvel Avengers Academy, voiced by Shadu Jackson.
- The Rayshaun Lucas incarnation of Patriot appears as a playable card in Marvel Snap.
- The Eli Bradley version of Patriot is a playable character in Marvel Contest of Champions added July 8, 2024.

== See also ==
- Super-Patriot (Marvel Comics)
