= Hawkeye (Kate Bishop) =

Marvel Comics superheroine

Kate Bishop
- Kate Bishop as Hawkeye taken from the cover of Young Avengers Presents #6 (June 2008). Art by Jim Cheung.

Publication information
- Publisher: Marvel Comics
- First appearance: Young Avengers #1 (April 2005)
- Created by: Allan Heinberg (writer); Jim Cheung (artist)

In-story information
- Alter ego: Katherine Elizabeth "Kate" Bishop
- Species: Human
- Team affiliations: Avengers; Young Avengers; Champions; West Coast Avengers; Secret Avengers
- Partnerships: Hawkeye (Clint Barton); America Chavez; Gwen Poole; Jeff Poole
- Notable aliases: Hawkeye; Hawkette; Lady Hawkeye; Lady Hawkguy
- Abilities: Highly skilled archer, fencer, swordswoman, martial artist, boxer, and other forms of combat; Use of two battle staves, a sword, a bow, and trick arrows

Katherine Elizabeth "Kate" Bishop is a fictional character appearing in American comic books published by Marvel Comics. Created by writer Allan Heinberg and artist Jim Cheung, Bishop first appeared in Young Avengers #1 (April 2005). She is the third character and first female to take the Hawkeye name, after Clint Barton of the Avengers and Wyatt McDonald of the Squadron Supreme. Her costume appearance is patterned on the first Hawkeye and Mockingbird. After forming the third iteration of the West Coast Avengers with Gwenpool, Kate and Gwen adopt Jeff the Land Shark, whom they raise in his solo series It's Jeff!.

Hailee Steinfeld portrays Kate Bishop in the Marvel Cinematic Universe (MCU), starting with the Disney+ miniseries Hawkeye (2021).

== Publication history ==
Hawkeye first appeared in Young Avengers #1 (April 2005), created by writer Allan Heinberg and artist Jim Cheung. She is first introduced as Kate Bishop and in issue #12, she takes up the Hawkeye mantle as the original Hawkeye was dead at the time after being killed in Avengers #502.

Alongside Clint Barton, Kate co-starred in Matt Fraction and David Aja's series Hawkeye (2012). Hawkeye then appeared in the Young Avengers (2013) series by Kieron Gillen and Jamie McKelvie. Kate co-starred with Clint in the All-New Hawkeye (2015) series by Jeff Lemire and Ramon Perez, redesigned by Leonardo Romero.

Cover of Hawkeye #1 (December 2016). Art by Julian Totino Tedesco.

Kate starred in her own Hawkeye book, written by Kelly Thompson, starting in the fall 2016 as part of the Marvel Now! relaunch. The book was cancelled with its 16th issue in early 2018. Thompson would then create the 2018 incarnation of the West Coast Avengers, which featured Kate as the team leader. Kate forms this team with Gwenpool (after the two met in The Unbelievable Gwenpool) and the series features them adopting Jeff the Land Shark.

Starting September 2021, Kate and Gwen would feature in Jeff's solo series, titled It's Jeff! and again written by Thompson with artists Gurihiru, initially released digitally on Marvel Unlimited before being published physically.

In November 2021, the five-issue limited series Hawkeye: Kate Bishop, by Marieke Nijkamp and Enid Balám, set after West Coast Avengers (2018) was released. This corresponded with Kate's Marvel Cinematic Universe (MCU) introduction in the Disney+ series Hawkeye (2021).

As part of the 2024 Venom War event, Kate, Gwen, and Jeff was featured in the one-shot Venom War: It's Jeff #1 (November 2024), again written by Thompson and illustrated by Gurihiru. Kate, Gwen, and Jeff return in the limited series Gwenpool (2025), by writer Cavan Scott and artist Stefano Nesi, which focuses on Gwen and Kate as they team up with Peter Parker in confronting the resurrected Gwen Stacy.

== Fictional character biography ==
Kate Bishop is the daughter of wealthy Manhattan socialites Derek Bishop and Eleanor Bishop and the sister of Susan Bishop. Eleanor was later apparently killed in Boulder, Colorado, leaving Derek to raise Kate and Susan.

=== Young Avengers Special ===
Young Avengers Special reveals that some time prior to joining the team, Kate Bishop was sexually assaulted in (what appears to be) Central Park. At first, the incident left Kate traumatized, but then it spurred her to engage in intense combat training. So far the rest of the Young Avengers are unaware of this incident, as Kate has only told her therapist and Jessica Jones. Kate's actual rape is not illustrated – only the initial ambush is shown on-panel.

=== Young Avengers ===
A "normal" civilian forcibly introduced to the Young Avengers in an early rescue attempt made by the team, Kate has demonstrated skill and level-headedness in high-pressure situations. Independent, tough-minded, and blunt, she is also an excellent archer. Her encounter with the young team led her to investigate them on her own, following them to Avengers headquarters and donning the gear of Mockingbird and Hawkeye, as well as what may be Swordsman's sword and Black Widow's belt. When Kate first appears wearing Mockingbird's mask, Patriot jokingly refers to her as "Hawkingbird." She invites herself to join the team after freeing them and helps them in their battle against Kang the Conqueror. She was subsequently confirmed as a member of the team.

After the team's first adventure stopping Kang, Captain America and Iron Man ordered the team to break up and refused to train the team without their parents' consent. However, Kate still wanted to be a Young Avenger. Believing the worst Captain America and Iron Man could do was inform their parents, Kate took the team to an abandoned warehouse previously owned by one of her father's companies, Bishop Publishing, which became the team's lair. She also had new uniforms made for them, since Cap told them to "never wear those uniforms again."

Kate is close with her friend and teammate Stature, and has a certain degree of chemistry with teammate Patriot, although their relationship is punctuated by near-constant bickering and one-upmanship; when Stature observed that "no matter what happens" Wiccan and Hulkling "have each other" and Kate has Patriot, Kate immediately objected, saying "all we do is fight". The team's newest member, Speed, immediately referred to Patriot as "your boyfriend," prompting another denial by Kate. Kate is the driving member of the team, pushing everyone to stay together and operates as the team's unofficial deputy-leader when Patriot's not around, even giving him occasional orders.

After Patriot is injured, Captain America informs the Young Avengers that he hopes that they start normal lives. Kate tells him if he had trained them, Patriot might not have been injured and it was best for him to help the Young Avengers by accepting them. Jessica Jones returns to give Kate the original Hawkeye's bow and arrows with a note from Captain America addressed to Hawkeye. Jessica told Kate that the only other person to stand up to Captain America the way Kate did was Hawkeye, and that Captain America wanted her to take Clint's codename. Kate did and became the third "Hawkeye."

=== Civil War ===
Kate has been identified as one of the 142 registered superheroes who appear on the cover of the comic book Avengers: The Initiative #1. However, she and Patriot (also on that cover) make a brief appearance in Doctor Strange's home, the hideout of the New Avengers in the second issue of Fallen Son: The Death of Captain America, casting some doubt into their allegiances. However, in the same issue of Fallen Son, Iron Fist remarks that "It's been a tough week" leading to the assumption that series takes place in the week following Captain America's death, and the Young Avengers may have registered after that. In the same series, however, Kate and Patriot confront Clint Barton, who had temporarily taken on the costume and shield of Captain America, who is attempting to capture them for being unregistered heroes, leaving more confusion.

Unaware of who he truly is, Kate berates Clint, saying that she took Hawkeye's name to honor him but did not copy his costume as that would be shameful; she further states that "if Hawkeye were alive, I'd call myself something else." Her words convince Clint to return the shield and costume to Tony Stark, condemn Stark for his role in the Civil War, and go his own path.

=== Young Avengers Presents ===
In the Young Avengers Presents limited series, Kate assists Patriot in tracking down Bucky Barnes, the Winter Soldier, aiding him in taking down a cell of A.I.M. cyborgs in the process.

In the last issue of the series, Kate goes on an awkward date with Eli, ultimately turning him down, to his embarrassment. She is then attacked by Ronin, who tests her abilities. He invites her to the Secret Avengers hideout and reveals himself to be Clint Barton. The two discuss determination to lead and "always taking the shot." Kate bets him that he cannot split an arrow (a supposedly impossible feat), and wagers his original bow. He wins using a far inferior bow, reiterating that no matter how impossible, when the lives of their teammates depend on it, one should always take the shot. Humiliated, Kate surrenders the bow and her codename, and is rebuffed by Patriot. Speed takes Kate out on a date to ease her tension and the two infiltrate the Secret Avengers base and reclaim the bow. Meanwhile, Clint attempts to advocate for the Young Avengers to the other Secret Avengers, wishing to serve as mentors to them. He notices Kate's presence and visits her later, granting her permission to use his name and bow, acknowledging that her infiltration demonstrated the determination necessary to lead her team. He offers her the Secret Avengers' support, giving her an old photo of himself, Captain America, the Scarlet Witch, and Quicksilver in their early days as Avengers. Reaffirmed, Kate approaches Eli and kisses him, asking him to be patient with her and give her time.

=== Secret Invasion ===
Kate participates in the battle against the Skrull invasion with her teammates, but is defeated, despite the aid of the Initiative. She and the Young Avengers later show up to join in the final fight. When she is knocked unconscious, her bow and arrows are used by Clint Barton, the original Hawkeye to continue the fight.

=== Siege ===
Kate joins the Young Avengers, New Avengers, and Secret Warriors in stopping Norman Osborn's siege of Asgard. Unfortunately, when the Sentry levels Asgard, Kate and Patriot are trapped beneath rubble. During a doubtful moment Patriot passionately kisses Kate, which prompts her to push him away after a startled moment. Not long after, they are rescued by their friends and rejoin their group, but not before Kate tells Patriot that was a 'Hell of a kiss' with a shared smile, hinting at the start of a relationship.

=== Avengers: The Children's Crusade ===
After the events of Siege, Kate is seen amongst the heroes celebrating at Avengers Tower. Clint Barton later encourages her to keep the name "Hawkeye" despite returning to the mantle himself, saying that the world is big enough for two "Hawkeyes" for now.

Kate appears alongside the other Young Avengers in Avengers: Children's Crusade.

Kate also appears alongside the other Young Avengers in Avengers: The Children's Crusade Young Avengers, a one-shot in which the Young Avengers are grown up and are now the Avengers. It is an alternate timeline altered by Iron Lad continuing to alter the timestream to defeat Kang the Conqueror.

=== Marvel NOW! ===
Kate appears alongside the original Hawkeye, Clint Barton, in the new Hawkeye series, which takes place after the Avengers vs. X-Men storyline. The two co-star in the series, focusing on street-level crime instead of being superheroes (which they acknowledge is what makes each of them Hawkeye). They maintain a mentor/student relationship, although they regularly exhibit competitiveness with each other; in a mission to help Clint, she takes down and then poses as Madame Masque, who becomes bent on exacting her revenge and ultimately killing Kate.

After Clint began acting increasingly aloof and hostile towards her and her attempts to help him, Kate decided to leave New York for a bit and go to Los Angeles, together with Clint's dog Lucky; however, as soon as she arrived there she learned that her father cut her off from his money, leaving her to her own devices. To earn some money, Kate put an ad describing herself as half-superhero, half-private eye. During her stay in L.A., she ran afoul on a criminal organization headed by Masque, and while she managed to bring it down, she learned that her father was implicated in it. Kate gave him a phone call and told him she would make him pay. She returned to New York to assist Clint in defeating the Tracksuit Mafia after they kill one of Clint's residents named Grills, with her dad secretly conspiring with other supervillains and mob bosses to put a hit on her and Clint.

In the series All-New Hawkeye, Kate and Clint retrieve Project Communion from Hydra, which turns out to be three young Inhumans with psychic abilities. They do not trust S.H.I.E.L.D. with them, so they rescue the kids from S.H.I.E.L.D. and have them live in Barton's apartment, until Hydra tracks their location. When Clint deems the children too dangerous to hold, they reluctantly hand them over to Hydra. Kate's trust in Clint is shaken, and she starts operating solo for a short time while re-evaluating her life and relationship with Clint. Clint eventually helps her come up with a plan to rescue the children from Hydra and fake Project Communion's deaths in front of S.H.I.E.L.D. to keep Maria Hill away. They have the kids stay with Barney while Clint contacts the Avengers to get a good security system for them. Kate tells Clint she still wants to be a solo hero for a while to be herself, as she has idolized Clint for so long and used the Hawkeye identity to avoid becoming like her dad, but is ready to become her own person. The series also explores Kate's childhood, where she initially idolized her father and wanted to be like him, but after learning about his criminal activities, decides that it would be best if neither know of each other's secret identities. This is realized after Kate was abducted by one of her dad's rival gangs, and she was rescued by Hawkeye and the Avengers, which inspired her to become a hero in the future.

Following Clint assassinating Hulk in Civil War II, Kate is angered by Clint's actions, but still shows some sympathy for the position he's in. She's more upset that the media is attacking her for Clint's actions, but is comforted by her former Young Avengers teammates. She sides with Iron Man in the conflict.

After the conflict, Kate moves back to Los Angeles and begins her own Private Eye investigations. It does not start too well as the residents were expecting Clint (either to hurt or praise him for his actions in Civil War II), but Kate is eventually approached by a college student who needs her help with a stalker.

Kate invites Gwenpool to join her in forming a new reality show-funded West Coast Avengers alongside Clint, America Chavez, Quentin Quire, and Kate's boyfriend Johnny "Fuse" Watts, facing B.R.O.D.O.K. (who later is revealed to be MODOK Superior) and Madame Masque once again, and ultimately discovering her mother to be alive as a vampire, preventing her cult from sacrificing America. In addition, Kate found that both her parents were part of Madame Masque's Masters of Evil, and Gwen adopted a baby land shark they named Jeff.

== Powers and abilities ==
Kate is highly skilled at archery, fencing, swordsmanship, jujitsu, gymnastics, boxing, and other forms of combat. She carries two battle staves similar to those once used by Mockingbird, a sword similar to the Swordsman's, as well as Clint Barton's bow and arrows. Black Panther had also supplied her with trick arrows.

== Reception ==
=== Critical reception ===
Gary Walker of CBR.com described Kate Bishop as one of Marvel's "most seasoned street-level heroes," writing, "Taking on the title of Hawkeye is no simple feat, but so far Kate Bishop has done the legacy proud. Though her beginnings were privileged and her tastes expensive, she has acclimated herself to helping and understanding the plights of the everyday person. Working alongside Clint Barton, she has helped see off several mafia-based threats to the streets of NYC. Kate took her talents out to Los Angeles, noticing an imbalance between heroes on the East Coast and the West Coast of the United States. While there, she proved herself to be a formidable street-level hero, operating alone without her fellow Young Avengers or the guidance of Clint." Sara Century of Syfy called Kate Bishop "one of the most popular new characters Marvel has released in the last two decades," saying, "Kate Bishop is one of the few superheroes who truly loves being a hero day after day and treats it like her job rather than an unending ethical burden. After moody and overly-aggressive heroes overwhelmed the landscape of comics for the better part of the last thirty years, sometimes it's nice to just read a heartwarming story about someone who really loves what they do. Kate might be a little impulsive and short-tempered sometimes, but she's also fun-loving, pure-hearted, and hilarious. She's dragged Clint Barton onto his feet with her sheer enthusiasm more times than anyone can count, and even when we see a glimpse of her in a possible future timeline in All-New Wolverine, she's still the same Kate Bishop we know and love today. In short, this is one of Marvel's best-beloved characters" Graeme McMillan of The Hollywood Reporter referred to Kate Bishop as a "fan favorite," asserting, "Originally introduced as a supporting character, Bishop quickly graduated to protagonist status as she revealed herself to be more thoughtful and capable — if no less impulsive — than the man who was technically her mentor. By the series' end, she had spent time in Los Angeles as a solo private eye, a status quo she'd return to for her first solo comic series, 2016's Hawkeye. The Kate Bishop of that series owed as much to Jim Rockford or Veronica Mars as she did Clint Barton or any other comic book archer, completing the transformation of the character from Young Avengers' hyper-competent, most confident member to an incarnation of the classic private eye trope — a detective who gets the job done, as much by coincidence and accident and personal charm as through use of her varied and impressive skill set. (Her personal life, of course, is very complicated as well.) The result is a hero unlike most in comic books, and one that is remarkably charming and enjoyable to read about; if the Kate Bishop of the MCU proves to be half as interesting, she'll be a welcome addition to the universe, and just might be many fans' new favorite character." Rosie Knight of Nerdist asserted, "This is another legacy character inclusion. Of course we aren't talking about Clint Barton, who's been on our screens a lot! The archer we want to see join the MCU is Kate Bishop, who first appeared in Young Avengers #1 by Allan Heinberg, Jim Cheung, John Dell, and Justin Ponsor. Bishop would be a brilliant addition, as she's a smart, sassy super who'd bring some much needed new blood to the team and already has a massive fan following."

=== Accolades ===
- In 2014, Autostraddle ranked Kate Bishop 4th in their "11 Female Superheroes I Wish Marvel Would Make Movies About" list.
- In 2015, Entertainment Weekly ranked Kate Bishop 21st in their "Let's rank every Avenger ever" list.
- In 2017, The Daily Dot ranked Kate Bishop 33rd in their "Top 33 female superheroes of all time" list.
- In 2018, Comic Book Resources (CBR) ranked Kate Bishop 15th in their "Marvel's 20 Most Seasoned Street-Level Heroes" list.
- In 2018, Nerdist included Kate Bishop in their "12 Avengers from the Comics Who We'd Still Love to See on the Big Screen" list.
- In 2019, The Mary Sue ranked Kate Bishop 4th in their "8 Young, New Heroes the Marvel Cinematic Universe Should Focus on Next" list.
- In 2019, CBR ranked Kate Bishop 3rd in their "Every Single Young Avenger Ever" list.
- In 2020, Scary Mommy included Kate Bishop in their "195+ Marvel Female Characters Are Truly Heroic" list.
- In 2020, CBR ranked Kate Bishop 3rd in their "Marvel's 10 Greatest Marksmen" list, 4th in their "Hawkeye: 5 Best Versions Of The Marvel Character (& The 5 Worst)" list, 5th in their "Marvel Comics: The 10 Best Legacy Superheroes" list, and 10th in their "10 Most Powerful Teen Heroes In Marvel Comics" list.
- In 2021, Screen Rant ranked Kate Bishop 9th in their "10 Most Powerful Members Of The Young Avengers" list and included her in their "Hawkeye: Kate Bishop & 9 Other Badass Female Archers In Comic Books" list.
- In 2021, CBR ranked Kate Bishop 6th in their "10 Smartest Marvel Sidekicks" list.
- In 2022, GameSpot ranked Kate Bishop 33rd in their "38 Marvel Cinematic Universe Superheroes" list.
- In 2022, The A.V. Club ranked Kate Bishop 23rd in their "100 best Marvel characters" list.

== Literary reception ==
=== Volumes ===
==== Hawkeye – 2016 ====
According to Diamond Comic Distributors, Hawkeye #1 was the 16th best selling comic book in December 2016. Hawkeye #1 was the 241st best selling comic book in 2016.

Jeff Lake of IGN gave Hawkeye #1 a grade of 8.8 out of 10, writing, "With a strong creative team and an equally strong opening act, Hawkeye #1 hits all targets. It's both fun and relevant, giving a fan favorite character her due in a story that feels perfectly geared to her many talents. Your Hawkeye or not, you'll like this book. Hawkeye #1 hits the ground running and never looks back, the creative team of Kelly Thompson, Leonardo Romero and Jordie Bellaire on target early and often. Their Kate is one immediately believable and root-worthy, her sharp wit and numerous talents put to great use from the start. With fantastic art and some strong early setup, it's easy to get excited by the potential shown here." Brandon Guerrero of ComicsVerse gave Hawkeye #1 a score of 84%, asserting, "Kate Bishop gets her own sassy, muscular ab-filled solo comic. Thompson and Romero create a fun look into the beginning of Kate's career in private investigating while she also manages to fight crime on the side."

==== Hawkeye: Kate Bishop – 2021 ====
According to Diamond Comic Distributors, Hawkeye: Kate Bishop #1 was the 32nd best selling comic book in November 2021. Hawkeye: Kate Bishop #1 was the 801st best selling comic book in 2021.

Dustin Holland of CBR.com called Hawkeye: Kate Bishop #1 a "fun, thrilling first issue that promises plenty of action and fun," saying, "Hawkeye: Kate Bishop #1 ends by hinting at an unseen antagonist, whose involvement threatens to recontextualize every element of Kate's case. This first issue is sure to leave fans anxious to see what happens next. Nijkamp, Balám, and Junior have filled this page-turner with an energy that can't be ignored. Hawkeye: Kate Bishop has all the makings of a great new series." Megan Peters of ComicBook.com gave Hawkeye: Kate Bishop #1 a grade of 4 out of 5 stars, stating, "Hawkeye: Kate Bishop pushes forward with a strong start in its debut, and this first issue finishes with that same power. A juicy cliffhanger promises a seedy trap is gunning for Kate, and readers know Hawkeye will deal with it in her usual (somewhat clumsy) fashion. So if you want to see how the case works out, Hawkeye: Kate Bishop better stay in your sights. It is rare for Kate to miss, and this solo series is aiming to take the heroine to all-new heights."

== Other versions ==
=== Ultimate Marvel ===
An Ultimate Marvel version of Kate Bishop appears as a 15-year-old classmate of Miles Morales. The character was initially unnamed but her identity is later confirmed by writer Brian Michael Bendis. Following a one-year ellipsis, the 16-year-old Kate is seen dating Miles. In this reality, Kate and her family are members of Hydra, and she believes they can make the world better. Miles eventually reveals to Kate that he is Spider-Man, which freaks her out and she does not talk to Miles for weeks. Miles eventually breaks up with Kate.

=== Avengers: The Children's Crusade ===
In Avengers: The Children's Crusade: Young Avengers, an alternate future Kate is seen still operating as Hawkeye for Kang's Avengers team. She is married to Tom Shepherd (now known as Quicksilver) and is expecting twins. Her outfit has changed to match Clint's original Hawkeye costume.

=== Secret Wars ===
An alternate version of Kate Bishop appears in Secret Wars as a resident of the Battleworld domain of King James' England. Similar to Robin Hood, she stole from the rich alongside her friends Teddy and Billy, but was caught by the Punisher Sheriff and distracted him so her friends could escape God Emperor Doom's judgement. During her time at the Shield, she met and befriended America Chavez and joined the Hel-Rangers, and eventually escaped with Chavez.

=== What If..? ===
In What If? House of M, Kate and the Young Avengers are killed by Red Skull one month after the depowering of every hero on the planet.

=== Old Man Logan ===
In Old Man Hawkeye, a prequel to Old Man Logan, a middle-aged Kate is the mayor of a refuge district deep in the wastelands. She later assists Clint in his revenge quest against the Thunderbolts. After doing so, he requests her help in delivering a case of super-soldier serum, but she refuses to help him on his endless revenge crusade and drives off to look after her district, correctly predicting that the task would kill Clint in the process.

=== Old Woman Laura ===
In a possible future in Old Woman Laura, an adult Kate assists in a raid on Latveria (one of her contributions being firing a bullet containing the permanently miniaturized Wasp into a Doombot so she can take over its systems). She also helps in the release of several imprisoned heroes.

== In other media ==
=== Television ===
Kate Bishop / Hawkeye makes a non-speaking appearance in the Avengers Assemble episode "Into the Future" as a resistance fighter from a possible future ruled by Kang the Conqueror.

=== Marvel Cinematic Universe ===
Kate Bishop appears in media set in the Marvel Cinematic Universe (MCU), portrayed by Hailee Steinfeld as a young adult and Clara Stack as a child. She debuts in the Disney+ miniseries Hawkeye (2021).

=== Video games ===
- Kate Bishop / Hawkeye appears as a costume for Clint Barton / Hawkeye in Marvel Heroes, voiced by Amanda C. Miller.
- Kate Bishop / Hawkeye appears as an unlockable playable character in Marvel Avengers Alliance.
- Kate Bishop / Hawkeye appears as an unlockable playable character in Lego Marvel's Avengers.
- Kate Bishop / Hawkeye appears as an unlockable playable character in Marvel Puzzle Quest.
- Kate Bishop / Hawkeye appears as an unlockable playable character in Marvel Future Fight.
- Kate Bishop / Hawkeye appears as a playable character in Lego Marvel Super Heroes 2 via the Champions DLC.
- Kate Bishop / Hawkeye appears as a playable DLC character in Marvel's Avengers, voiced by Ashly Burch.
- Kate Bishop / Hawkeye appears as a cosmetic character outfit in Fortnite.

=== Miscellaneous ===
Kate Bishop appears in the "Hawkeye" segment of Marvel's Wastelanders, voiced by Tracie Thoms. This version entered a relationship with Luke Cage and Jessica Jones' son Jason Jones, with whom Bishop had a daughter named Ash Morse. Following Jason's death, Bishop leaves Ash in Clint Barton and Bobbi Morse's care.

== Collected editions ==
Hawkeye's solo appearances have been collected in a number of trade paperbacks:

Title	Material collected	Pages	Publication date	ISBN
Trade paperbacks
Hawkeye, Vol. 5: All-New Hawkeye	All-New Hawkeye, Vol. 1 #1–5	112	November 17, 2015	978-0785194033
Hawkeye, Vol. 6: Hawkeyes	All-New Hawkeye, Vol. 2 #1–6	136	July 5, 2016	978-0785199465
Hawkeye, Vol. 3 Hardcover	All-New Hawkeye #1–5, All-New Hawkeye, Vol. 2 #1–6	248	October 18, 2016	978-1302902193
Hawkeye: Kate Bishop, Vol. 1: Anchor Points	Hawkeye Vol. 5 #1–6	136	June 13, 2017	978-1302905149
Hawkeye: Kate Bishop, Vol. 2: Masks	Hawkeye Vol. 5 #7–12	136	January 2, 2018	978-1302905156
Hawkeye: Kate Bishop, Vol. 3: Family Reunion	Hawkeye Vol. 5 #13–16, Generations: Hawkeye & Hawkeye #1	112	May 22, 2018	978-1302910976
Hawkeye: Kate Bishop	Hawkeye: Kate Bishop (2021) #1–5	120	May 10, 2022	978-1302932992
Graphic novel trade paperbacks
Hawkeye: Private Eye	Hawkeye Vol. 5 #1–12	288	August 20, 2019	978-1302917951
Hawkeye: Go West	Hawkeye Vol. 5 #13–16, Generations: Hawkeye & Hawkeye #1, West Coast Avengers #1–4	224	March 30, 2021	978-1302923433
Hawkeye: Team Spirit	West Coast Avengers #5–10, War of the Realms: Journey Into Mystery #1–5	248	March 15, 2022	978-1302934781
