= The Mighty Avengers =

Comic book series

- The Mighty Avengers #1 (May 2007); Cover art by Frank Cho

Publication information
- Publisher: Marvel Comics
- Schedule: Monthly
- Publication date: May 2007 – April 2010
- Main character(s): Current members Blue Marvel; Luke Cage; Captain America; Kaluu; Power Man; She-Hulk; Spectrum; Spider-Man; White Tiger

Creative team
- Created by: Brian Michael Bendis; Frank Cho
- Written by: Brian Michael Bendis; Dan Slott
- Penciller(s): Frank Cho; Mark Bagley; Khoi Pham
- Inker: Danny Miki
- Colorist: Jason Keith

The Mighty Avengers is an American comic book series that was published by Marvel Comics. Originally written by Brian Michael Bendis, also the writer of New Avengers, the title first featured an officially sanctioned Avengers team of registered superheroes, residing in New York City as part of the Fifty State Initiative, as opposed to the unlicensed team featured in The New Avengers. This first incarnation of the team is led by Iron Man and Ms. Marvel, with the second lineup featuring Hank Pym as the leader, and the third led by Luke Cage and Monica Rambeau.

== Publication history ==
The team first appears in The Mighty Avengers #1 (May 2007), written by Brian Michael Bendis and pencilled and inked by Frank Cho. The roster, led by Ms. Marvel, also consisted of Ares, Black Widow, Iron Man, Sentry, Wasp and Wonder Man. In the wake of the superhero "Civil War", Iron Man recruits Ms. Marvel as leader of the revamped team. Together they select the first roster.

The Mighty Avengers was originally intended to run parallel with New Avengers, with characters and events crossing over and being viewed from both perspectives. However, artist Cho fell behind schedule, and left the book after six issues and an additional cover. Successor Mark Bagley drew the series from issues #7–11 (early March – late May 2008).

The series was canceled with The Mighty Avengers #36 (April 2010), at the conclusion of the Siege storyline.

The team was relaunched in September 2013 under the creative team of Al Ewing and Greg Land. The new team is more street-level and is led by Luke Cage. The team contains new versions of Ronin, White Tiger and Power Man, plus Blue Marvel, the Superior Spider-Man, She-Hulk, Spectrum, and the Falcon. It ran for fourteen issues.

In November 2014 as part of the Marvel Now initiative, a third volume was launched: Captain America and the Mighty Avengers. This volume was written by Al Ewing and illustrated by Luke Ross and Iban Coello. This volume was cancelled in June 2015, after nine issues.

== Fictional team biography ==
Following the federally sanctioned creation of this iteration of the Avengers, Iron Man (Tony Stark) is discredited and publicly vilified after his inability to anticipate or prevent a secret infiltration and invasion of Earth by the shape-shifting alien Skrull race, and by the Skrull disabling of his StarkTech technology, which had a virtual monopoly on worldwide defense.

Following the Skrulls' eventual defeat and the subsequent dissolution of S.H.I.E.L.D., the officially sanctioned team of Avengers, now led by Norman Osborn under the H.A.M.M.E.R. banner, is spun off into the pages of Dark Avengers.

In response, Hank Pym, in his latest superhero persona as the new Wasp, leads an Avengers team outside the U.S. and H.A.M.M.E.R.'s jurisdiction. With the apparent help of the Scarlet Witch—actually, a disguised Loki, the Norse trickster god—he summons the Vision and Stature of the Young Avengers, U.S. Agent, Jocasta, Hercules, Amadeus Cho, and Iron Man.

Claiming to be the only authentic team of Avengers due to being the only team operating under that name to have a founding member on the roster, the team operates from an interdimensional headquarters. It is granted official recognition outside the U.S. by the international organization G.R.A.M.P.A. and combats supervillains and other entities, including Chthon and the Unspoken.

During the events of Infinity, a new team of Mighty Avengers are formed during Thanos' invasion of Earth. With the main Avengers branch off in space, the defense of New York falls to a group of former Avengers and the remnants of Luke Cage's recently disbanded Heroes for Hire squad. They are given the name "Mighty Avengers" after a Twitter hashtag used to describe the group.

During the Inhumanity storyline, Luke Cage keeps the Mighty Avengers together and made the remodeled Gem Theater as their base. The Mighty Avengers now have the purpose of helping those in need. During this time, the Spider Hero becomes the new Ronin.

During the Secret Wars storyline, Steve Rogers tells the Mighty Avengers team that the world is ending and asks them to side with him or the Illuminati. Two weeks before the end of the world, the Mighty Avengers join Rogers in a fight against the Illuminati. The Mighty Avengers help out in the incursion against Earth-1610.

== Team roster ==
=== Initiative team (2007–2008) ===
The Mighty Avengers were founded by Ms. Marvel and Iron Man, as New York's team under the Fifty State Initiative.

| Character | Real Name | Joined in | Notes |
|---|---|---|---|
| Iron Man | Anthony "Tony" Edward Stark | Mighty Avengers #1 (May 2007) | Removed from being director of S.H.I.E.L.D. in Secret Invasion #8. |
| Ms. Marvel | Carol Susan Jane Danvers | Mighty Avengers #1 (May 2007) | Became member of the New Avengers. |
| Wonder Man | Simon Williams | Mighty Avengers #1 (May 2007) | Resigned in Secret Invasion #8. |
| The Wasp | Janet van Dyne (a.k.a. Janet Pym) | Mighty Avengers #1 (May 2007) | Died in Secret Invasion #8. Later revealed that she was actually shunted to the Microverse |
| Black Widow | Natalia Alianovna Romanova (a.k.a. Natasha Romanoff) | Mighty Avengers #1 (May 2007) | Resigned in Secret Invasion #8. |
| Sentry | Robert "Bob" Reynolds | Mighty Avengers #1 (May 2007) | Became member of the Dark Avengers. Presumed deceased as of Siege #4. |
| Ares | Ares (a.k.a. John Aaron) | Mighty Avengers #1 (May 2007) | Became member of the Dark Avengers. Presumed killed in Siege #2. Later turned up alive in Contest of Champions #8 (2016). |
Infiltrator (2007)
| Spider-Woman | Veranke (posing as Jessica Drew) | Mighty Avengers #7 (November 2007) | A double agent with the New Avengers. Revealed to be a Skrull in Secret Invasion #3 (May 2008). Died in Secret Invasion #8. |

=== International team (2009–2010) ===
After the events of "Dark Reign", the Mighty Avengers were followed by a reorganized Initiative team published in Dark Avengers, and a new international team was featured in Mighty Avengers.

| Character | Real Name | Joined in | Notes |
|---|---|---|---|
| Ant-Man | Dr. Henry Jonathan "Hank" Pym | Mighty Avengers #21 (March 2009) | Chosen by the "Scarlet Witch", who was actually Loki. Challenged for leadership by Iron Man, but assumed full leadership after defeating Chthon. |
| Hercules | Heracles | Mighty Avengers #21 (March 2009) | Presumed killed in the Assault on New Olympus. Returned in Chaos War #1 (Oct. 2010). |
| Amadeus Cho | Amadeus Cho | Mighty Avengers #21 (March 2009) | |
| Jocasta | | Mighty Avengers #21 (March 2009) | |
| U.S. Agent | John Frank Walker, Jack Daniels (alias) | Mighty Avengers #22 | Former member of Omega Flight, chosen in the place of an incapacitated Captain America. Removed by Norman Osborn in Mighty Avengers #33. |
| Stature | Cassie Lang | Mighty Avengers #22 | Concurrent members of the Young Avengers. |
| Vision | Jonas (alias) | Mighty Avengers #22 | Concurrent members of the Young Avengers. |
| Quicksilver | Pietro Django Maximoff | Mighty Avengers #24 | Joined the team after helping them defeat Titan. |
Infiltrator (2009)
| Scarlet Witch | Loki (posing as Scarlet Witch) | Mighty Avengers #21 (March 2009) | Joined and assembled the Mighty Avengers in Mighty Avengers #21 (March 2009). Revealed in Mighty Avengers #29 (November 2009). |

=== Infinity recruits (2013–2014) ===
During the Infinity storyline, a new team was assembled. "The Mighty Avengers" volunteer organization is based out of the old Gem Theatre in Times Square, offering their services as non-profit heroes for free or a charitable contribution.

| Character | Real name | Joined in | Notes |
|---|---|---|---|
| Luke Cage | Lucas Cage (born Carl Lucas) | Mighty Avengers Vol. 2 #1 | Founder and business director. |
| Spectrum | Monica Rambeau | Mighty Avengers Vol. 2 #1 | Field leader, former member of Nextwave |
| Ronin | Eric Brooks (aka Blade) | Mighty Avengers Vol. 2 #1 | First appeared as "Spider Hero." His identity was leaked in an earlier draft of a script. His identity was officially revealed in Mighty Avengers #9. |
| Blue Marvel | Adam Brashear | Mighty Avengers Vol. 2 #2 | |
| Power Man | Victor Alvarez | Mighty Avengers Vol. 2 #3 | Former students at Avengers Academy, former members of the Heroes for Hire. |
| White Tiger | Ava Ayala | Mighty Avengers Vol. 2 #3 | Former students at Avengers Academy, former members of the Heroes for Hire. |
| Falcon aka Captain America | Samuel "Sam" Wilson | Mighty Avengers Vol. 2 #4 | Also a member of the main Avengers team as Captain America. |
| She-Hulk | Jennifer Walters | Mighty Avengers Vol. 2 #6 | Legal counsel for the Mighty Avengers and concurrent member of the Future Foundation. |
Infiltrator (2013)
| Superior Spider-Man | Otto Octavius's mind in Peter Parker's body | Mighty Avengers Vol. 2 #1 | Self-declared member, also member-on-probation of the main Avengers team. He leaves the team in Mighty Avengers Vol. 2 #5. |

=== Avengers NOW! (2014–2015) ===
The new team was relaunched under the title of Captain America and the Mighty Avengers as part of "Avengers NOW!"

| Character | Real name | Joined in | Notes |
|---|---|---|---|
| Kaluu | | Captain America and the Mighty Avengers #1 (November 2014) | Current members of the Mighty Avengers. |
| Spider-Man | Peter Benjamin Parker | Captain America and the Mighty Avengers #3 (January 2015) | Current members of the Mighty Avengers. |

== Reception ==
The first issue of The Mighty Avengers was the second highest selling comic for that month based on Diamond Publisher's indices.

IGN reviewer Richard George said Brian Michael Bendis' writing for The Mighty Avengers #1 "manages to move through the roster selection, convey their basic information and personality, marshal them against a huge threat and leave us with a solid cliffhanger". George also praised Frank Cho's artwork, saying, "The artist not only delivers with some excellent action sequences, he does a great job with the increasingly standard widescreen format that many are adopting."

=== Circulation ===
| Issue | Qty | icv2 Top 300 Ranking |
|---|---|---|
| 1 | 141,288 | 2 |
| 2 | 121,365 | 8 |
| 3 | 115,440 | 8 |
| 4 | 107,768 | 8 |

== Collected editions ==
| Title | Material collected | Publication date | ISBN |
Volume 1
| Mighty Avengers Vol. 1: The Ultron Initiative | Mighty Avengers (vol. 1) #1–6 | April 2008 | 978-0785123682 |
| Mighty Avengers Vol. 2: Venom Bomb | Mighty Avengers (vol. 1) #7–11 | July 2008 | 978-0785123699 |
| Mighty Avengers Vol. 3: Secret Invasion (Book 1) | Mighty Avengers (vol. 1) #12–15 | December 2009 | 978-0785130109 |
| Mighty Avengers Vol. 4: Secret Invasion (Book 2) | Mighty Avengers (vol. 1) #16–20 | February 2009 | 978-0785136507 |
| Mighty Avengers Vol. 5: Earth's Mightiest | Mighty Avengers (vol. 1) #21–26 | August 2009 | 978-0785137467 |
| Mighty Avengers Vol. 6: The Unspoken | Mighty Avengers (vol. 1) #27–31 | March 2010 | 978-0785137474 |
| Mighty Avengers Vol. 7: Siege | Mighty Avengers (vol. 1) #32–36 | September 2010 | 978-0785148005 |
| Mighty Avengers: Assemble | Mighty Avengers (vol. 1) #1–11 | March 11, 2009 | 978-0785137580 |
| Mighty Avengers: Secret Invasion | Mighty Avengers (vol. 1) #12–20 | March 24, 2010 | 978-0785142614 |
| Mighty Avengers: Dark Reign | Mighty Avengers (vol. 1) #21–36 | August 17, 2011 | 978-0785156697 |
| Mighty Avengers by Brian Michael Bendis: The Complete Collection | Mighty Avengers (vol. 1) #1-20 | April 2017 | 978-1302903381 |
| Mighty Avengers by Dan Slott: The Complete Collection | Mighty Avengers (vol. 1) #21-36, Secret Invasion: Requiem #1 | April 2019 | 978-1302915667 |
Volume 2
| Mighty Avengers Vol. 1: No Single Hero | Mighty Avengers (vol. 2) #1–5 | April 1, 2014 | 978-0785188742 |
| Mighty Avengers Vol. 2 Family Bonding | Mighty Avengers (vol. 2) #6–10 | August 12, 2014 | 978-0785188759 |
| Mighty Avengers Vol. 3: Original Sin – Not Your Father's Avengers | Mighty Avengers (vol. 2) #11–14 | December 23, 2014 | 978-0785190721 |
Volume 3 (Captain America & the Mighty Avengers)
| Captain America & the Mighty Avengers Vol. 1: Open for Business | Captain America & the Mighty Avengers #1–7 | July 7, 2015 | 978-0785193821 |
| Captain America & the Mighty Avengers Vol. 2: Last Days | Captain America & the Mighty Avengers #8–9, Captain Britain & the Mighty Defenders #1–2, Avengers Assemble #15AU | November 3, 2015 | 978-0785198031 |

== In other media ==
The Mighty Avengers appear in Avengers Assemble, led by a disguised Ultron and consisting of Ant-Man, Black Panther, Captain Marvel, Ms. Marvel, Red Hulk, Songbird, and Vision.
