= Speed (character) =

Marvel Comics superhero

- Tommy Shepherd as Speed. Art by Jim Cheung.

Publication information
- Publisher: Marvel Comics
- First appearance: As Thomas Maximoff: The Vision and the Scarlet Witch #12 (September 1986); As Thomas Shepherd: Young Avengers #10 (March 2006)
- Created by: Thomas Maximoff: Steve Englehart; Richard Howell; Thomas Shepherd: Allan Heinberg; Jim Cheung

In-story information
- Alter ego: Thomas "Tommy" Shepherd
- Species: Human mutant
- Team affiliations: Champions; Young Avengers
- Partnerships: Wiccan (twin brother); M'Kraan (creation)
- Notable aliases: Tommy Maximoff; Not-Patriot
- Abilities: Supersonic speed; Molecular acceleration; Superhuman strength, durability, and agility; Accelerated perception; Hyperkinetic vibrations; Superhuman reflexes; Fast metabolism; Intangibility; Whirlwind creation

Speed (Thomas "Tommy" Shepherd) is a fictional superhero appearing in American comic books published by Marvel Comics. The character is depicted as a member of the Young Avengers, a team of teenaged superheroes in the Marvel Universe. His powers are similar to his uncle Quicksilver. Created by Allan Heinberg and Jim Cheung, Speed first appeared in the comic book Young Avengers #10 (March 2006). In the 12th issue, he adopts the costumed identity Speed and joins the Young Avengers.

His story sees him discovering that he and the magical teen hero Wiccan are long-lost twin brothers, and that the pair are the reincarnations of the formerly illusory sons of the Scarlet Witch and her former husband Vision. Tommy is the reincarnation of Thomas Maximoff, a character created by Steve Englehart and Richard Howell who first appeared in The Vision and the Scarlet Witch #12 (September 1986). As a bisexual individual, Tommy has dated Kate Bishop and David Alleyne.

A young Tommy appeared in the Marvel Cinematic Universe (MCU) Disney+ miniseries WandaVision (2021), portrayed by Gavin Borders and Jett Klyne. Klyne returned as a version of Tommy from an alternate reality in the film Doctor Strange in the Multiverse of Madness (2022). Maximoff returned in his teenage reincarnation, Thomas Shepherd's body, in the series VisionQuest (2026), portrayed by Ruaridh Mollica.

== Publication history ==
Speed made his debut in Young Avengers #10 (March 2006) when he was recruited into the team after being broken out of prison. He was a main character until the conclusion of the series, adopting the code name Speed in the twelfth and final issue (August 2006).

Afterwards, Speed continued to appear alongside his team in miniseries such as Young Avengers Presents and Dark Reign: Young Avengers; the event comic tie-ins Civil War, Secret Invasion and Siege: Young Avengers (co-starring with The Runaways in the former two); and various other guest appearances. From 2010 to 2012 he was a part of the main cast in Avengers: The Children's Crusade, written and drawn by the original Young Avengers creative team of Allan Heinberg and Jim Cheung.

Speed next appeared in Young Avengers (vol. 2) #6 (August 2013) before mysteriously vanishing on being absorbed by his future self, the "Not-Patriot". He reappeared at the end of issue #14 (February 2014), with his recovery shown in the final issue #15 (March 2014).

Apart a single-panel appearance in the Scarlet Witch series by James Robinson, Speed was absent from comics for five years until a guest appearance alongside the other former Young Avengers in The Unstoppable Wasp #7 (July 2019). He was since featured in the event comic tie-in Lords of Empyre: Emperor Hulkling (September 2020), made a non-speaking cameo in the epilogue issue Empyre: Aftermath (November 2020), and guest-starred in X-Factor (vol. 4) #7 (April 2021) and #10 (August 2021). He was a supporting character in the limited series X-Men: The Trial of Magneto.

== Fictional character biography ==
=== Thomas Maximoff ===
Thomas and William were twins, with Tommy being the older of the two, Thomas and William supposedly born to Scarlet Witch and Vision; in reality, Scarlet Witch used her reality warping powers to create twin sons, unknowingly, from two of five scattered fragments of the soul of the demon Mephisto that were previously lost to him in an ill-fated encounter with the powerful mutant child Franklin Richards. When the boys' souls were reabsorbed into Mephisto, because of the power Wanda put into the soul fragments, they destroyed him and their souls were reincarnated as Thomas Shepherd, the Young Avenger Speed, and Billy.

=== Thomas Shepherd ===
Thomas "Tommy" Shepherd was raised in Springfield, New Jersey, as the only son of Frank and Mary Shepherd, who are divorced.

Wiccan and the other Young Avengers locate him as another teenager with ties to the Avengers using the same program devised by the Vision that Iron Lad used to locate most of the current Young Avengers, their intent being to recruit more super-powered teens who could help them rescue their abducted teammate, Hulkling.

The Young Avengers find Tommy in a high-powered facility in Springfield that Hawkeye (Kate Bishop) initially describes as "just juvie" (juvenile hall), though the facility and its staff are equipped with advanced offensive and defensive technology such as robotic suits and power dampening containment cells.

Vision states that Tommy is being held at the facility, presumably under court order, because he "accidentally" vaporized his school. When they release him from his cell, it is immediately noted that Tommy, a white-haired speedster, bears a striking resemblance to Billy ("twin-like") and Quicksilver, sharing the latter's hair color and similar abilities.

The team encounters the armed officers of the facility. Tommy cynically and cruelly begins attacking the officers and fleeing doctors, stating that he had been locked up for months and that during his time there, he was tested and experimented on with the goal to make him into a living weapon. Hawkeye and Patriot manage to stop him and convince him to join them in rescuing their teammate Hulkling from Kl'rt the Super-Skrull. Little more has been revealed about the facility or Tommy's experiences there prior to his release, nor have they been addressed by the other Young Avengers or Tommy himself.

Tommy joins Billy as they search for the Scarlet Witch through Genosha and Wundagore before finally encountering Master Pandemonium at a former residence of the Scarlet Witch and the Vision. Pandemonium decides not to fight the boys after recognizing Wiccan's magic as being the same as the Scarlet Witch's. Instead, he elaborates on their history concerning Mephisto and the Scarlet Witch and advises them that the history they search for is filled with "darkness and chaos" and that they should embrace who they are in the present.

He goes on a date with Kate to help relieve her tensions about losing her name and bow to Clint Barton. He then helps her break into the Secret Avengers home base and reclaim her bow. During the course of the evening, the two share a kiss, addressing the heretofore unspoken love triangle between himself, Kate, and Patriot. However, Kate decides to attempt a relationship with Patriot instead. Tommy decides to officially join the team and adopts the codename Speed.

When the Young Avengers confront the group of teenagers that have been using their name, Tommy immediately recognizes the member Coat of Arms (Lisa Molinari). It is revealed that Tommy knew her from "juvie" and is implied that they used to have a relationship.

Tommy and his friends are recruited to assist in defending Asgard when it is attacked by the forces under the control of Norman Osborn. Specifically, Tommy is tasked with delivering a backup suit of armor to Iron Man, which is essential in winning the day.

An older version of Tommy appears alongside the other Young Avengers in Avengers: The Children's Crusade – Young Avengers, a one-shot with the possible future timeline where the Young Avengers are grown up and now the Avengers. Tommy is together with Kate, who is pregnant and expecting twins. The timeline is the result of Iron Lad continuing to alter the timestream in an attempt to defeat Kang the Conqueror.

When the Young Avengers disband following the events of Children's Crusade, Tommy gets a job assembling tablet computers. He eventually meets and befriends Prodigy, a former member of the New X-Men, and partners with the boy to catch a mysterious entity dressed as Patriot. The "not-Patriot" entity attacks Speed and dissipates his body, before leaving a horrified Prodigy behind. On deducing that the "not-Patriot" is a future version of one of the Young Avengers, when Prodigy kisses the not-Patriot, Tommy reappears in the not-Patriot's place with no memory of being missing, implying he is the "not-Patriot". Finding himself unexpectedly kissing Prodigy, he jumps back and says that Prodigy is "moving too fast". Later that night Tommy dances with Kate and is embraced tightly by Wiccan.

In the one-shot Lords of Empyre: Emperor Hulkling, Speed and Prodigy appear to be dating. They go out drinking with Hulkling, who describes that they "always have exactly one and a half drinks and start making out". Their relationship status is confirmed in Marvel Voices: Pride #2021, where the characters discuss their different attitudes to being bisexual. For Prodigy, the label is material to his identity and helps him understand himself better, whereas Speed says "I crushed on who I crushed and... never did much worrying about the labels."

Speed does not move to the mutant island nation of Krakoa along with Prodigy. He is shown visiting Prodigy at X-Factor headquarters on Krakoa by running across the ocean, rather than using the Krakoan gates. He later attends the Hellfire Gala and discovers the Scarlet Witch's corpse; afterwards remaining on Krakoa while X-Factor conduct the murder investigation. Later in the pages of NYX, after the fall of Krakoa, David explains that he has broken up with Speed some time prior, and has moved on with a new boyfriend.

== Powers and abilities ==
Speed is a mutant with the power to move and accelerate at speeds far beyond those of normal human beings. His physiology is designed to move at high speeds which also grants him superhuman reflexes, agility, and durability. This durability is limited to impact forces, so bullets, energy blasts, and other piercing attacks are capable of harming him. It is also likely that Speed possesses a high amount of superhuman strength in his lower body, allowing him to lift around 1 ton, while his upper body is strengthened to the point where he can lift around 800 lbs. Although his top speed is unknown, he can exceed the speed of sound (about 1,225 km/h, or 761 mph) and resist the effects of friction, reduced oxygen, and kinetic impact while moving at those speeds. In Young Avengers Presents #3 he asserts that he is "Quicksilver fast", shown running from the eastern seaboard of the United States to Genosha, an island off the east coast of Africa, as well as search the entire island for anyone living there in the same amount of time it takes Wiccan to teleport the same distance. This indicates that Speed is fast enough to run across the surface tension of a body of water without sinking. In addition, his mind can operate in an accelerated state, allowing him to read in super speed and remember everything he has seen.

He can also generate hyperkinetic vibrations that accelerate the molecules in matter, causing any solid object he directs his vibrations at to explode. During the Civil War: Young Avengers and Runaways crossover, when both teams invaded the Cube to save their friends, Speed is shown exploding a gun in his hand by using his hyperkinetic vibrations. He is also able to accelerate his molecules (or even those of small groups of people) and vibrate fast enough to pass through solid matter, such as walls.

== Reception ==
=== Critical reception ===
Nishid Motwani of Comic Book Resources (CBR) referred to Speed as a "fan favorite character audiences can't help but love," writing, "Speed has spent a lot of time isolated. He was kept in a facility where high-powered individuals are held captive and experimented upon. Despite the things he has gone through, Tommy's personality is still vibrant and he instantly makes fans fall in love with him." Alex Schlesinger of Screen Rant wrote, "Speed sits at a unique intersection where Young Avengers fans feel they know Tommy and have witnessed his growth, and yet have incredibly few stories where he's a central character. Now would be the perfect time to tap Speed to act as the team lead and mentor for the next generation of youthful superheroes. Speed has the charisma, power, legacy, and connections to be an ideal leader, and it would be incredibly helpful for a new team to have a slightly older, more experienced leader who could guide them in their heroics. The hero Speed, son of the Scarlet Witch, has not been utilized enough in Marvel Comics, but hopefully the future will give Tommy the spotlight as the leader of the Young Avengers."

=== Accolades ===
- In 2018, CBR ranked Speed 20th in their "25 Fastest Characters In The Marvel Universe" list.
- In 2021, Looper ranked Speed 9th in their "Fastest Speedsters In History" list.
- In 2021, Screen Rant ranked Speed 8th in their "10 Most Powerful Members Of The Young Avengers" list.
- In 2022, CBR ranked Speed and Wiccan 1st in their "10 Best Twins In Comics" list, and ranked Speed 7th in their "8 Fastest Avengers" list and 12th in their "Marvel: The 20 Fastest Speedsters" list.

== Other versions ==
=== Avengers Fairy Tales ===
In the one-shot Avengers Fairy Tales, Speed appears as the White Rabbit in an adaptation of Alice's Adventures in Wonderland. He refers to the March Hare (Wiccan) as his brother.

=== The Last Avengers Story ===
Tommy Maximoff. Art by Ariel Olivetti.

In the alternate timeline of The Last Avengers Story, Billy and Tommy grew up as the children of the Vision and the Scarlet Witch. As a child, Tommy witnessed the accidental murder of his mother by his uncle, Quicksilver, which caused their father, the Vision to become emotionless and withdrawn. Tommy (known as "Tommy Maximoff") goes on to learn magic under Doctor Strange.

== In other media ==
=== Marvel Cinematic Universe ===
Tommy Maximoff and Thomas Shepherd appears in media set in the Marvel Cinematic Universe (MCU).

- Tommy first appears in the miniseries WandaVision (2021), portrayed by Gavin Borders as a five-year old and Jett Klyne as a ten-year old. This version was created by Wanda Maximoff via chaos magic when she placed Westview, New Jersey within a "Hex". Throughout the miniseries, Tommy and his twin brother Billy age rapidly until their powers manifest and Agatha Harkness kidnaps them in an attempt to steal Wanda's magic. After rescuing them, Wanda undoes the hex, ending Tommy and Billy's existence. In a post-credits scene, she hears them crying for help, which are later revealed to have come from multiversal variants in Multiverse of Madness (see below).
- An alternate reality variant of Tommy Maximoff from Earth-838 appears in Doctor Strange in the Multiverse of Madness (2022), portrayed again by Klyne.
- Tommy appears in the Agatha All Along (2024) episode "Follow Me My Friend / To Glory at the End", portrayed by an uncredited stand-in. While traveling the Witches' Road, Agatha helps Billy connect with Tommy's soul and place it in the body of a teenage boy who had drowned during a botched prank.
- Thomas Shepherd appears in VisionQuest (2026), portrayed by Ruaridh Mollica. This version is a grifter working with pickpocket Lisa Molinari, who claims to be Vision's son Tommy Maximoff. Some time ago, they were together after escaping from a residential facility at the Saint Mabyn Psychiatric Sanatorium, living as street thieves, until Thomas was kidnapped by Paladin, who took him back to Saint Mabyn to use as bait for Vision, who then rescued Tommy and escaped from Paladin with him. After a mission at a gala, Tommy realizes that Vision has kept Ultron's existence a secret, who now controls his body following a confrontation with the android Jocasta. Following a revelation about his true self, Tommy enlists the help of Lisa, Paladin, and E.D.I.T.H. to rescue Vision from the hands of the Client known as Vigil Horton. Afterward, Tommy and Billy reunite to resurrect Vision, bringing the three of them back together once more.

=== Video games ===
- Speed appears as an unlockable playable character in Lego Marvel's Avengers, voiced by Josh Keaton.
- Speed appears as an unlockable playable character in Marvel Avengers Academy.
