= Stature =

Stature may refer to:

- Human stature, the distance from the bottom of the feet to the top of the head in a human body, standing erect
- Reputation, social opinion about an entity
- Respect, feeling of regard for someone or something
- Stature (comics), fictional character
