= Prodigy (David Alleyne) =

Marvel Comics superhero

- Prodigy as depicted in New X-Men #43 (December 2007). Art by Skottie Young.

Publication information
- Publisher: Marvel Comics
- First appearance: The New Mutants (vol. 2) #4 (October 2003)
- Created by: Nunzio DeFilippis (writer); Christina Weir (writer); Keron Grant (artist)

In-story information
- Alter ego: David Alleyne
- Species: Human mutant
- Team affiliations: New Mutants training squad; X-Men in training; Young Avengers; Xavier Institute; New X-Men; Champions; X-Factor
- Notable aliases: Brain Boy; Prodigy
- Abilities: Possesses the combined knowledge of every mind he has encountered up to M-Day, including the X-Men; Ability to mimic the knowledge possessed by others; High-level intellect

Prodigy (David Alleyne) is a superhero appearing in American comic books published by Marvel Comics. Created by Nunzio DeFilippis, Christina Weir, and Keron Grant, the character first appeared in New Mutants (vol. 2) #4 (October 2003). Prodigy was a student at the Xavier Institute. The character has also been a member of the X-Factor, the New X-Men, and the Young Avengers at various points in his history. Prodigy is one of the main characters of the second volume of NYX in July 2024, where he is now a professor at Empire State University (ESU).

== Publication history ==
David Alleyne / Prodigy debuted in New Mutants (vol. 2) #4 (October 2003), and was created by writers Nunzio DeFilippis and Christina Weir, and artist Keron Grant. He appeared again in the 2017 America series, and then the 2020 X-Factor series, confirming his relationship with Speed, continued in the 2021 Marvel's Voices: Pride anthology series, and the 2022 Marvel's Voices Infinity Comic anthology series.

In April 2024, it was announced that Prodigy would have a starring role in NYX (vol. 2), set for a July 2024 release as part of the "X-Men: From the Ashes" relaunch. It is written by Collin Kelly and Jackson Lanzing with art by Francesco Mortarino. The new ongoing series centers on Prodigy and several other mutant young adults – Kamala Khan, Laura Kinney, Sophie Cuckoo, and Anole – attempting to adapt to life in New York City in the post-Krakoan Age, when mutants are hated and feared even more due to the actions of Orchis.

== Fictional character biography ==
=== Early life and moving to the Xavier Institute ===
David Alleyne is originally from Chicago, Illinois. A naturally intelligent boy, he finds that the answers to his exams and assignments begin appearing in his head whenever he is in the same room as his teachers. He realizes that he is a mutant with the ability to know anything that the people nearby know. Wanting to retain this knowledge, David becomes driven to study even harder. He takes college-level courses while finishing high school and drops subtle hints to his family about his powers, but they fail to realize he is a mutant until the campus anti-mutant group outs him. Realizing he can no longer be a mutant in secrecy, David accepts an invitation from Danielle Moonstar to attend the Xavier Institute for Higher Learning. His parents and sister are supportive of his decision.

At the school he befriends Wind Dancer, Wallflower, and Wither. Dani makes David roommates with Josh Foley, a former member of the Reavers who left the group after learning that he was a mutant. The tactic works, and David soon comes to regard Josh as a little brother. Along with his other friends at the school, they bring to Xavier Institute the homeless mutant Surge, who David acquires an immediate interest in.

David, Josh, Surge, Wind Dancer, Wallflower, and Wither are placed on Dani's squad of students, called "the New Mutants," and David is given the codename Prodigy. Not liking the idea that he is being groomed to be an X-Man, David declines to be the team leader, leaving the position to Wind Dancer. However, she quickly loses faith in her ability to lead. They compromise by becoming team co-leaders. Believing that he is a combat liability because the knowledge from his mutant power is transient, Prodigy learns from Emma Frost that he has a mental block that prevents him from permanently retaining knowledge. When he asks Frost and Danielle Moonstar to remove the block, they refuse and create an illusion to show him the potential consequences of doing so. In the illusion, he becomes President of the United States and establishes a utopian worldwide government before Surge learns of his plan to attack China and destroys the White House, killing them both. In spite of this, the two enter a relationship.

=== Power loss and the New X-Men ===
In the "Decimation" storyline following the events of House of M, David is one of the many mutants who loses his powers because of the Scarlet Witch. Planning to leave the school, David reveals that he built a "Danger Cave" to replace the destroyed Danger Room before he lost his powers. The facility allows his teammates to train by reliving former X-Men missions. David's parents and Cyclops decide that it would be safer for David to remain at the mansion since William Stryker is targeting depowered mutants as well. When Stryker attacks the mansion, David saves the Stepford Cuckoos and is wounded by one of the Purifiers. He joins the New X-Men later when they leave to fight the mutant-hunting future Sentinel Nimrod. David proves useful to the team when he attacks the robot with the heavy artillery. After returning to the mansion, he is invited to join Surge in running the New X-Men squad, giving them free rein to add more members at their will.

In the "Quest for Magik" storyline, the demon Belasco senses Magik's returned presence due to her temporary revival during House of M, but cannot locate her and fails to magically revive her (instead creating the dark, soulless form of Illyana called Darkchilde, whom he banishes in disgust). Sensing her presence on the students at the Institute due to their involvement with her in the "House of M" reality, he incapacitated the X-Men and sucks the students into Limbo, including David, whose eyesight was healed to normal vision by Josh using his newly acquired medical expertise. Belasco interrogates David about her whereabouts, but since none of the students remember the House of M reality, he is confused and tells her that she is still dead. Enraged, Belasco kills David by ripping out his heart. Some of the students break free and attack Belasco, while Josh manages to immediately regrow David's heart with his powers, bringing him back to life. While the students battle against Belasco, David realizes that his weakness is telepathy, having put special helmets to block the telepathic powers of Stepford Cuckoos and Martha Johansson. David directs X-23 to free the Cuckoos, who launch a telepathic attack on Belasco. Though initially successful, the Cuckoos are forced out of Belasco's mind, but he is ultimately defeated by Pixie and Darkchilde. The students are later returned to Earth by Darkchilde, who seals off all entrances to Limbo.

=== Regaining knowledge and skills ===
Prodigy and Surge's relationship comes to an end soon after. Learning of David's near-death experience in Limbo, Surge fears for his safety and attempts to force him to leave the school by kissing Hellion in front of him. David prepares to leave, but is confronted by the Cuckoos, who offer to remove his mental blocks as thanks for saving them during Stryker's attack, restoring all the past knowledge and skills he absorbed when he had his powers. Though he can no longer absorb other people's knowledge, he now possesses the collective knowledge and skills of every individual he absorbed before the onset of Decimation, including Beast's vast medical and technological expertise and the elite fighting skills of several of the X-Men. Using Krav Maga martial arts picked up from Wolverine and Shadowcat, Prodigy bests Hellion in combat, fully aware that the kiss had just been a ploy. He then breaks up with Surge and is appointed as a substitute instructor by Cyclops.

In the X-Men crossover event X-Men: Messiah Complex, the X-Men, the Marauders, Predator X, as well as the anti-mutant Purifiers all race to recover the first mutant child born since M-Day, who was kidnapped from her hometown. Thinking the Purifiers may have the baby, Surge leads the New X-Men in a mission against to attack the Purifiers' base and recover her. Prodigy declines participation and stays behind at the school, viewing the mission to be largely out of vengeance against the Purifiers for their murdered schoolmates than to truly locate the baby. While the New X-Men are away on their mission, the school is attacked by Sentinels from the Office of National Emergency, who have been controlled by Cassandra Nova's nano-bots. Prodigy assists Beast in the hospital wing stabilizing the severely injured students and faculty. He later repairs Cerebro with the Cuckoos, who state that they find the structure of his brain fascinating.

=== Manifest Destiny & Utopia ===
After the events of Messiah Complex, the X-Men disband and later reform in San Francisco. Prodigy relocates with the X-Men to assist Beast in setting up Cerebro. He continues to work with the X-Men, though he is no longer on any active teams, instead running the new Danger Room and assisting the X-Men during the Skrull invasion and the take over of San Francisco by Norman Osborn and his Dark X-Men as well as joining the rest of the mutants to the mutant island Utopia, where he assists Cyclops keeping the island maintained. He is later seen in the field helping out Hellion and Surge deal with the resurrected Rusty Collins.

=== Second Coming ===
Cyclops leaves Prodigy in charge of surveillance of the island's resources after a barrage of attacks by Bastion. Beast and Prodigy access a dome placed over Utopia and San Francisco and come to the conclusion that the dome is able to send over hundreds of thousands of Nimrods to kill the X-Men and remaining mutants, causing him to break down emotionally.

=== Schism and Regenesis ===
When a giant Sentinel attacks Utopia, Prodigy joins in the fight along with the other students to help destroy it. When Wolverine decides to leave Utopia and return to Westchester to reopen the school, Prodigy is among the younger X-Men who choose to stay at Utopia.

=== Young Avengers ===
Bitter and disillusioned at Cyclops' manipulation, David is later seen working at a superhuman call center, where he uses his knowledge to help various people solve superhuman crises. While employed there, he meets and befriends Tommy Shepherd, the Young Avenger Speed. The two work together on a stakeout to catch a thief dressed as Patriot, but the plan goes awry when the criminal dissipates Tommy's body and then fades away. He joins the Young Avengers to help them find Speed and while stranded in another dimension with Hulkling, he kisses him. In issue #9 he reveals he is bisexual. After the main villain of the Vol was eliminated, he was talking to Patri-not and came up with a theory that he will become Patri-not in the future. During this he kisses the entity, allowing Tommy to reappear. Their relationship is later revisited in Lords Of Empyre: Emperor Hulkling, where they are seemingly together.

Prodigy is featured in the 'Original Sins' five-issue limited series. Marvel Boy, Prodigy, and Hulkling become involved in the plans by the Hood to siphon off cosmic knowledge endangering innocent people. There are multiple betrayals and back-tracking, as the heroes are convinced the knowledge driving the civilians mad could be safely converted into data that helps all of humanity.

It is shown later that Prodigy auditions to be the security expert at the new Stark Industries, though he loses the job to Ant-Man.

Prodigy enrolls in the extra-dimensional Sotomayor University. He develops a close friendship with the superhero America Chavez. He helps protect the university from multiple threats, external and internal. Prodigy makes his own friends, such as with the Sotomayor fraternity called 'The Betas' and an outside group of allies unofficially known as the 'Chavez Guerrillas'.

=== Dawn of X ===
After regaining his powers through Krakoa's resurrection protocols, Prodigy joins a new X-Factor team to investigate suspicious mutant deaths before said resurrection protocols can be utilized on them. He and Forge take part in a automobilistic race with Krakoan organic technology. He also comforts Wolfsbane (Rahne Sinclair) about the impossibility of resurrecting her and Hrimhari's son Tier. He also cameos with other mutants (Frenzy, Storm, Bling, and Gentle) defending Wakanda against an invasion.

In the one-shot Lords of Empyre: Emperor Hulkling, written by Chip Zdarsky and queer author Anthony Oliveira, around Empyre, Marvel's summer 2020 crossover event, Oliveira brings Prodigy and Speed into canon as an out couple, drinking with Hulkling, who claims they "always have exactly one and a half drinks and start making out."

=== From the Ashes ===
Prodigy teaching in NYX (vol. 2) #1 (July 2024) by artist Francesco Mortarino and colorist Raúl Angulo.

Prodigy later becomes a professor at Empire State University (ESU), with Kamala Khan and Sophie Cuckoo as students in his "Examinations of Post-Krakoan Diaspora" class. Sophie comments that Prodigy is the youngest professor in the university's history and on tenure track.

== Powers and abilities ==
Prodigy has the telepathic ability to absorb and mimic the knowledge and skills from the minds of the people close to him. A side effect of his powers are self-imposed mental blocks, which prevents him from retaining the knowledge he absorbs, forgetting whatever he has learned after a short period of time. The power is completely involuntary and absorbs only studied knowledge, not thoughts, short-term information, or awareness.

Since losing his powers, he maintains a high intellect, due to his extensive studying prior to coming to Xavier's. He creates a Danger Cave, a training room for the rest of his peers, and shows an extensive knowledge of the past missions of the X-Men. When the mental blocks in his mind are removed by the Stepford Cuckoos, David later regains access to all the skills and knowledge that he absorbed when he was still a mutant. He can recall the fighting abilities and scientific knowledge of many of the X-Men including Beast's medical knowledge, Forge's and Professor Xavier's expertise in various subjects, Wolverine and Kitty Pryde's martial arts, etc. He has since regained his powers without losing all of the above knowledge. Via the Krakoa Resurrection Protocols, he has had his psychomimetic powers restored.

Additionally, Prodigy has demonstrated leadership abilities as a leader. Both Cyclops and Danielle Moonstar have acknowledged his leadership skills.

== Reception ==
=== Critical response ===
Stacie Rook of Screen Rant included David Alleyne in their "10 LGBTQ+ Marvel Heroes That Should Join The MCU" list. Chase Magnett of ComicBook.com included David Alleyne in their "8 More New Mutants We Want Back at Marvel Comics" list, saying, "He's a valuable new perspective with a very unique ability that any clever writer would relish utilizing in superhero adventures."

== In other media ==
Prodigy appears in Marvel Snap.
