= Cassie Lang =

Marvel Comics fictional character

Cassandra Lang
- Cassandra Lang / Stature. Textless cover of Young Avengers Presents #5 (July 2008). Art by Jim Cheung, John Dell, and Justin Ponsor.

Publication information
- Publisher: Marvel Comics
- First appearance: As Cassie Lang: Marvel Premiere #47 (April 1979); As Stature: Young Avengers #6 (May 2006); As Stinger: The Astonishing Ant-Man #6 (May 2016)
- Created by: Cassie Lang: David Michelinie John Byrne; Stature: Allan Heinberg Jim Cheung; Stinger: Nick Spencer Annapaola Martello

In-story information
- Alter ego: Cassandra Eleanor "Cassie" Lang
- Species: Human mutate
- Team affiliations: Mighty Avengers; Young Avengers; The Initiative; Champions
- Partnerships: Nate Richards / Iron Lad; Jonas / Vision
- Notable aliases: Giant-Girl; Ant-Girl; Stinger; Stature
- Abilities: Self size manipulation; Trained hand-to-hand combatant

Cassandra "Cassie" Lang is a character appearing in American comic books published by Marvel Comics. Created by David Michelinie and John Byrne, the character first appeared in Marvel Premiere #47 (April 1979). Cassandra Lang is the daughter of the superhero Scott Lang / Ant-Man. She has also been known as Stature, Stinger, and Ant-Girl at various points in her history.

Since her original introduction in comics, the character has been featured in various other Marvel-licensed products, including video games and merchandise. In the Marvel Cinematic Universe (MCU), the character was portrayed as a child by Abby Ryder Fortson in Ant-Man (2015) and Ant-Man and the Wasp (2018), and as a teenager by Emma Fuhrmann in Avengers: Endgame (2019) and Kathryn Newton in Ant-Man and the Wasp: Quantumania (2023) and will reprise the role in Avengers: Doomsday (2026).

== Publication history ==
Cassandra Lang debuted in Marvel Premiere #47 (April 1979), created by writer David Michelinie and artist John Byrne. She later appeared under the codename Stature in the 2005 Young Avengers series, by Allan Heinberg and Jim Cheung. She appeared in the 2008 Young Avengers Presents Stature one-shot, her first solo comic book. According to Diamond Comic Distributors, it was the 81st best selling comic book in May 2008. She appeared under the codename Stinger in the 2015 The Astonishing Ant-Man series, by Nick Spencer and Anna Paola Martello.

== Fictional character biography ==
=== Ant-Man's daughter ===
Cassie Lang is introduced to the Marvel Universe as the ill daughter of Scott Lang. Her congenital heart condition forces her father to steal Hank Pym's Ant-Man equipment and Pym Particles, which he uses to rescue Doctor Sondheim, the only doctor able to cure Cassie's condition, from Cross Technological Enterprises.

After the divorce of her parents, Cassie lives for most of her childhood with her father, whom she loves and admires greatly. Although Scott tries his best to keep his superhero life secret, Cassie gradually finds out that he is Ant-Man, and secretly experiments with his Pym Particle supplies on her own. She is fascinated by her father's life as a superhero, and generally has a good relationship with her father's colleagues.

Scott's time as an engineer for the Fantastic Four brings Cassie to the team's then-headquarters of Four Freedoms Plaza. There, Cassie forges a strong friendship with Kristoff Vernard, the adoptive son of Doctor Doom. Cassie helps Kristoff adjust to life outside of Doom's castle, and she develops a crush on him. It is also during this time that she meets her father in his Ant-Man identity, and confesses that she had known about it for a long time.

After the Fantastic Four go missing and Scott Lang finds himself without a job, he takes employment at Oracle, Inc. with the Heroes for Hire (H4H). Her adventures with the Heroes for Hire give Cassie a taste for the action-filled life of a superhero, but it causes her mother Peggy Rae to take sole custody from Scott. As a result of Cassie being kept away from her father Scott, she grows bitter toward her mother and her stepfather Blake Burdick. As a police officer, Blake cannot stand the world of superheroes the young girl loves, and he unsuccessfully tries to keep Cassie and Scott apart. For years, Cassie visits her father whenever possible, much to her mother and stepfather's chagrin, until the events of "Avengers Disassembled," when Scott is killed.

=== Young Avengers ===
Cassandra Lang in her first costume from Young Avengers Special #1 (December 2005). Art by Neal Adams.

Iron Lad, a younger version of Kang the Conqueror, desperate for help against his future self after learning what he will become, uses Vision's database to track and recruit young superpowered individuals connected to the Avengers' history; however, Cassie Lang is not one of the individuals on the list. Wishing to join the Young Avengers, she and Kate Bishop meet the young heroes at the Avengers Mansion; when they refuse to let them join or to let her take her father's gear, she angrily rebukes them, only to discover much to her own shock that by doing so she had increased her size. She later confesses that she had repeatedly stolen Pym particles from her father for years, but until then it seemed they never had any effect on her. Cassie later displays the ability to also shrink.

Iron Lad assures her that if Vision had known she had developed powers, she would have been part of his plans for the Young Avengers, thus accepting her as a teammate; she then takes part in the battle against Kang, which ends in the villain's defeat. However, as the altered timeline causes several of them to disappear, Iron Lad realizes that he must return to his own time and accept the fact that he will become Kang, much to Cassie's sorrow, as she had fallen in love with him.

While Captain America and Iron Man order the team to disband, both Cassie and Kate refuse and convince the others to keep the team active; after initially considering Ant-Girl or Giant-Girl, she ultimately adopts the codename Stature, along with a new costume based on her father's. Despite this, she feels guilty when overhearing her mother and stepfather discussing the possibility of her being a member of the team, also showing that rage or guilt make her respectively grow or shrink, metaphorically reflecting her being a shrinking violet about her family issues. After deciding to continue her life as a superhero, Cassie overhears her stepfather talking to her mother. They suspect that she is secretly Stature, but refuse to believe it. Later, Jessica Jones talks to Cassie's mother and confirms Cassie's dual identity. Cassie's mother is overwhelmed by this news and begs Jessica not to tell her husband about this due to his hatred of superheroes; she also worries that although Cassie was cured of her heart condition, her heart might not be able to handle the strain of continuous size-changing.

In the Civil War limited series, Cassie, along with her fellow Young Avengers, join Captain America's resistance to the Superhero Registration Act; she and the rest of her team stay at a safe house, while Nick Fury arranges new secret identities for them. During this time, she participates in a rescue effort, which turns out to be a trap laid by Iron Man: during the subsequent battle, Goliath is killed and Wiccan captured. Afterwards, Cassie opts to leave Captain America's side and to register, citing her reasons as wishing to fight villains rather than cops and other heroes.

=== The Initiative ===
Cassie Lang joins the Initiative as a trainee. Along with fellow Initiative members Dusk, Tigra, Silverclaw, and Araña, she is ensnared by the Puppet Master. Although she (along with the others) is mentally controlled into fighting Ms. Marvel, she is eventually freed from the mind control.

Cassie's time at Camp Hammond brings her in to contact with her father's successor as Ant-Man: Eric O'Grady. O'Grady makes several disparaging remarks about her father, not realizing that she is within earshot; this causes a brawl between the two as both grow to their giant forms. After O'Grady picks up a bus and hits Cassie with it, Hank Pym intervenes. Taskmaster breaks up the fight by attacking their now giant-sized Achilles tendons, bringing all three crashing to the ground.

Later, Vision visits Cassie, disguising himself as Tony Stark to take her out on a date. After fighting off an attempt by A.I.M. to steal the Vision, he confesses that because he was programmed based on Iron Lad's mental patterns, he shares Iron Lad's attraction to her, and hopes that she can love him; Cassie is unsure, but does not reject him, telling him to give her time to sort things out.

Cassie accidentally injures her stepfather Blake while stopping the Growing Man. Her guilt causes her to continue shrinking down, and the other Young Avengers attempt to snap her out of it before she shrinks into non-existence. With the help of Patriot, she comes to terms with the responsibilities and risks of her position as part of the Young Avengers and the Initiative, reasoning that Blake also faces the risks as a policeman.

=== Dark Reign ===
In the aftermath of the Skrull invasion, Cassie Lang leaves the Initiative at the start of the Dark Reign storyline and rejoins the Young Avengers. Cassie and Vision (now seemingly in a relationship) fly to the Avengers Mansion ruins, having been summoned by Wiccan with warnings of a great magical threat. After finding their teammates turned to stone, they encounter the Scarlet Witch transporting them away to be a part of the Mighty Avengers, led by Hank Pym. Despite her evident and vocal distrust of Scarlet Witch, whom she holds responsible for her father's death, she remains on the team. During a confrontation with the Fantastic Four for a device of the late Bill Foster, she refuses to participate in the attack and instead warns them about what was really happening, citing her reluctance to fight those she feels are like family to her.

=== The Children's Crusade and death ===
When Wiccan's uncontrolled magical energy nearly kills several members of the Sons of the Serpent, the Avengers begin to fear that he might become another Scarlet Witch; they explain to the Young Avengers how the Scarlet Witch went insane after the loss of her children, resulting in the death of the original Vision and Scott Lang, and rendering nearly all of the world's mutants powerless. When Wiccan feels unsure about what to do, Cassie suggests that they try to find the Scarlet Witch, believing that if they can show her that her children are alive, she may be able to reverse everything she has done, including her father's death.

During the team's search in Latveria, Cassie is reunited with Iron Lad, and, when he takes the team back to the period of "Avengers Disassembled", she is able to bring her father forward in time to the present, saving his life.

After the Scarlet Witch is found, Doctor Doom steals her powers and fights the combined forces of the Avengers and X-Men. As Doom seemingly kills her father (who actually managed to shrink down and escape with minor wounds), a distraught Cassie charges Doom, gaining time for Scarlet Witch and Wiccan to prepare a joint spell to remove his new powers; however, Doom retaliates by blasting Cassie with an explosive spell, killing her.

=== Resurrection ===
Cassie Lang from Avengers World #16 (December 2014). Art by Ramon Rosanas.

During the AXIS storyline, Doctor Doom is transformed into a more heroic, altruistic form as a result of the battle with the Red Skull that involved a spell that inverted heroes and villains' personalities. Seeking redemption for his past crimes, but only able to draw on enough power to alter one key event, Doom chooses to use that power to resurrect Cassie.

In the Ant-Man ongoing series, she is shown living a normal life as a middle-school student. Worried that Scott's lifestyle and actions might attract more danger to her, Cassie's mother decides to relocate to Miami despite Cassie's reluctance. Scott nonetheless decides to relocate there as well to stay near his daughter. She is later kidnapped by Crossfire on behalf of Augustine Cross, who believes that Cassie's Pym Particle-irradiated heart can sustain his father Darren Cross. After Cassie's heart is removed and transplanted into Cross, Dr. Sondheim transplants another heart into Cassie's body to make sure she survives.

A now powerless Cassie struggles with her everyday activities, while feeling frustrated by her current status; feeling resentful over Scott's seeming disappearance, she is later shocked and outraged to find out that he was secretly following her around, watching over her. One day, she is reunited with Kate, who has found out about her resurrection; despite her lack of powers, she follows her friend to a Secret Empire hideout, but almost gets killed, which further fuels her frustration, despite Kate's assurances. However, Cassie ultimately decides to turn to Power Broker to regain her powers; although he realizes that she has no intention of actually becoming a supervillain, he tells her about Darren Cross having stolen her heart and that her father hid it from her. Power Broker offers a deal, in which he will grant her wish if she infiltrates Cross' base to shut him down; Cassie accepts, and adopts the new codename Stinger.

When Scott learns about her disappearance, he rushes to help her, but ends up captured in her place; however, Cassie manages to get his crew to help him escape. In the end, though, because of Darla's show, they end up discovered by the police; to protect his daughter, Scott takes the blame and claims he kidnapped and forced her to help him. Cassie captures Power Broker shortly after her father's arrest. When Cassie finally confesses to her mother what she did, Peggy takes her to the trial, where they are attacked by Darren Cross, Crossfire, and Egghead. Cassie rushes to help her father, and the two make amends during the fight, which ends with Cassie defeating Cross. Cassie's mother is called as the final prosecution witness, but surprisingly she declares that Scott was innocent, as he always looked after Cassie and has always been her hero, admitting that he took the blame for what she did; this allowed Scott to be acquitted. Afterward, Cassie finally receives her mother's blessing as a superhero, and joins her father as a new crimefighting duo.

== Powers and abilities ==
Cassie Lang alongside her gigantic alter ego Stature. From The Astonishing Ant-Man #6. Art by Mark Brooks

Cassandra Lang possesses the ability to increase and decrease her size. She can become roughly 40 feet (12 m) tall and can shrink to the size of an ant. Her abilities seemed to be fueled by her emotions. She grows when she gets angry and shrinks when she feels guilty. Cassie seems to have become more powerful since first demonstrating her powers, as she has in recent issues surpassed her previous growth limit. At first she struggled to shrink to 6 inches and grow to 10–15 feet. She has been seen growing larger than the Skrull Yellowjacket, who could grow to at least 100 feet (30 m) tall. It was established that she and Hank Pym share an upper limit of somewhere around 250 feet (76 m) in height, and that, if she keeps her bigger dimensions for too long, Cassie will suffer from strains that will eventually force her to shrink back down.

As Stinger, she has a helmet similar to that of Ant-Man, which allows her to communicate with and control "over five thousands species of ants and insects"; she also sports a suit with bio-synthetic wings that allow her to fly, and that can fire bio-electric blasts from the wrists.

== Reception ==
=== Critical response ===
James Hunt of Den of Geek stated, "Cassie's parents weren't killed forcing her to swear revenge. She didn't grow up in fantastical circumstances. She doesn't have a secret destiny to fulfil. In fact, it's these unremarkable circumstances that make Cassie Lang an ideal choice of character to invest in, because she's someone you can't find anywhere else on screen: A normal child who wants to be a superhero because she's seen how superheroes work. What kid wouldn't relate to that?" Deirdre Kaye of Scary Mommy called Cassandra Lang a "role model" and a "truly heroic" female character.

Screen Rant ranked Cassandra Lang 9th in their "13 Best Avengers Members Who Joined in the 2000s" list. Comic Book Resources ranked Cassandra Lang 2nd in their "10 Best Versions Of Ant-Man" list, 6th in their "10 Strongest Pym Particle Users In Marvel" list, and 8th in their "10 Young Avengers Ranked By How Good They Would Be As Leader Of The Avengers" list.

David Caballero of Collider said, "Cassie is a typical teenager who thinks she knows better. However, she is neither selfish nor unlikable; on the contrary, she is caring and supportive, doing everything she can to help her father, even if it means putting herself at risk. Cassie has all the makings of a great hero." Michele Kirichanskaya of The Mary Sue ranked Cassandra Lang 5th in their "8 Young, New Heroes the Marvel Cinematic Universe Should Focus on Next" list.

=== In popular culture ===
In 2008, Cassandra Lang was referenced in the song "Nrrrd Grrrl" by American rapper and actor MC Chris.

== Other versions ==
=== Avengers: The Children's Crusade ===
An alternate future version of Cassandra Lang / Stinger appears in Avengers: The Children's Crusade as a member of the Avengers.

=== Marvel Fairy Tales ===
An alternate version of Cassandra Lang, based on Alice, appears in Marvel Fairy Tales.

=== MC2 ===
Cassie Lang as Stinger from A-Next #1.

An alternate version of Cassandra Lang appears in MC2. She is now a doctor and operates under the name Stinger on the group A-Next. Although she is the oldest member of A-Next, in her mid-20s, and the only one on the original team with a professional life and a scientific background, she is still doted on by her father, who constantly worries about her newfound superhero life. She possesses many abilities originally engineered by Hank Pym, including manipulating her size, flying, communicating with insects, and firing bioelectric "stinger" blasts.

=== Ultimate Marvel ===
An alternate version of Cassandra Lang appears in the Ultimate Marvel imprint. This version is initially a member of the Ultimates Reserves' Giant-Women squad. Lang later appears as a member of Nick Fury's Howling Commandos.

=== What If? ===
Multiple alternate versions of Cassandra Lang appears in What If.

- In "The Leaving," which takes place fifty years into an alternate future, Cassandra Lang is a nursemaid for the elderly Scarlet Witch.
- In "What If Iron Man Lost the Armor Wars", Cassandra Lang is taken hostage by Justin Hammer to force Scott Lang's cooperation against his benefactor Tony Stark. When Hammer is later assassinated and his knowledge over the Iron Man armor claimed by A.I.M., Scott and Cassie are taken hostage by them as well, but are eventually freed by Stark clad in the Firepower armor.
- In "What If Captain America Led ALL the Superheroes against the Registration Act," Cassandra Lang is killed in a confrontation with government-launched Sentinels.

== In other media ==
=== Television ===
- Cassandra Lang appears in The Avengers: Earth's Mightiest Heroes episode "To Steal an Ant-Man", voiced by Colleen O'Shaughnessey.
- Cassandra Lang appears in the Ant-Man (2017) episode "Science Fair", voiced by Sky Alexis.

=== Film ===
Cassie Lang as she appeared in the MCU films: Abby Ryder Fortson (left) as a child in Ant-Man and Ant-Man and the Wasp, Emma Fuhrmann (middle) as a teenager in Avengers: Endgame and Kathryn Newton (right) as a young adult in Ant-Man and the Wasp: Quantumania.

Cassandra "Cassie" Lang appears in the Marvel Cinematic Universe (MCU) films Ant-Man (2015), Ant-Man and the Wasp (2018), Avengers: Endgame (2019), and Ant-Man and the Wasp: Quantumania (2023), portrayed by Abby Ryder Fortson as a child, Emma Fuhrmann as a teenager, and Kathryn Newton as a young adult. Newton will reprise the role in Avengers: Doomsday (2026).

=== Video games ===
- Cassandra Lang / Stinger appears as a playable character in Marvel Contest of Champions.
- Cassandra Lang appears as a playable character in Marvel Future Fight.
- Cassandra Lang / Stature appears as playable character in Lego Marvel's Avengers.
- Cassandra Lang / Stinger appears as a playable character in Marvel Avengers Academy.
- Cassandra Lang / Stature appears in Marvel Snap.

=== Merchandise ===
In 2023, Hasbro released an action figure of Cassandra Lang, based on the MCU incarnation, as part of the Marvel Legends line.
