= Young Avengers =

Group of fictional characters

- Promotional art for Young Avengers Special #1 (2006); Art by Jim Cheung

Group publication information
- Publisher: Marvel Comics
- First appearance: Young Avengers #1 (April 2005)
- Created by: Allan Heinberg (writer); Jim Cheung (artist)

In-story information
- Base(s): Bishop Publishing; New York City; Formerly; Ruins of Avengers Mansion; New York City
- Member(s): America Chavez; Hawkeye; Hulkling; Iron Lad; Kid Loki; Noh-Varr; Patriot; Prodigy; Speed; Stature; Vision; Wiccan

Young Avengers

Series publication information
- Schedule: Monthly
- Format: Limited series
- Publication date: April 2005 – January 2014
- Number of issues: Volume 1; 13; Volume 2; 15
- Creator(s): Allan Heinberg (writer); Jim Cheung (artist)

Collected editions
- Sidekicks: ISBN 0-7851-2018-1
- Family Matters: ISBN 0-7851-1754-7

The Young Avengers are the names of two superhero teams appearing in American comic books published by Marvel Comics. Created by Allan Heinberg and Jim Cheung, the first team appeared in Young Avengers #1 (April 2005). The Young Avengers team features numerous adolescent characters who typically have connections to established members of Marvel's primary superhero team, the Avengers.

Young Avengers follows the events of the 2004–2005 "Avengers Disassembled" storyline. The four founding members of the team are gathered as a result of the Vision's plan for the reformation of the Avengers in the event the team disbanded. In the series, newspapers refer to the young heroes as "super-powered fanboys" and label them the "Young Avengers", a name the team members initially dislike but that sticks nonetheless.

== Publication history ==
The first team appeared in Young Avengers #1 (April 2005), created by Allan Heinberg and Jim Cheung. Marvel's 1940s forerunner, Timely Comics, had an unrelated character, Young Avenger, who debuted in USA Comics #1 (August 1941).

The Young Avengers were originally featured in several notable Marvel crossover series, including the Civil War and The Children's Crusade events, before the series was relaunched in January 2013 as part of the Marvel NOW! rebranding by writer Kieron Gillen and artist Jamie McKelvie.

In 2019, Rio de Janeiro mayor Marcelo Crivella ordered Avengers: Children's Crusade to be censored as various instances of homosexuality such as the relationship between Hulkling and Wiccan were displayed. Crivella said the content was "improper for children". Writer Kieron Gillen was disappointed about the changes. The organizers of the Bienal do Livro book fair, where the comic was being sold, repudiated the mayor's decision and decided not to remove the book from sales. On September 6, Avengers: Children's Crusade sold out at the event.

== Fictional team biography ==
=== Volume 1 ===
Reporters Jessica Jones and Kat Farrell of the Daily Bugle and heroes Captain America and Iron Man investigate a new group of teenage heroes. Although the team defeats Kang the Conqueror, Captain America and Iron Man take away their gear and refuse to train the team without their parents' consent. Despite the heroes' warnings, the team continues with a new headquarters, new costumes, and new names. At the insistence of Farrell, Jones interviews the Young Avengers about their pasts.

Kl'rt the Super-Skrull tries to take Teddy Altman to the Skrull homeworld. Kl'rt reveals that Mrs. Altman is not Teddy's mother and kills her. In the aftermath, Kl'rt kidnaps Teddy. Vision offers to locate more Young Avengers using his prior incarnation's contingency plan. The Young Avengers break Thomas Shepherd out of a superhuman prison and recruit him. Tommy can move at superhuman speed and accelerate matter, destabilizing it enough to cause an explosion. Super-Skrull tells Teddy of his true origin as the son of the Kree hero Captain Marvel and the Skrull princess Anelle. He then claims that Tommy and Billy are the Scarlet Witch and Vision's lost twin sons. Billy believes him, but Tommy does not. Kree and Skrull combat forces arrive and fight each other and the Young Avengers until Teddy, realizing his importance to both sides, calls for a ceasefire. The Avengers intervene and a Kree warrior fires at Captain America. Patriot intervenes and is gravely wounded. Hulkling and Kl'rt end the fighting by secretly impersonating each other with their shapeshifting abilities. Captain America and Kl'rt, disguised as Hulkling, broker a shared custody between the races.

At a hospital, Eli's grandfather Isaiah Bradley donates his blood to Eli, giving him genuine superpowers. Captain America again tells the Young Avengers to stop what they are doing. Kate Bishop blames their trouble on the Avengers for not training them. The Young Avengers repair the statues of fallen Avengers at Avengers Mansion. Kate receives Hawkeye's bow and quiver from Captain America, and she takes the mantle of Hawkeye. Tommy arrives in costume, calling himself Speed.

=== "Civil War" ===
In Civil War #2, the members of Young Avengers are captured by S.H.I.E.L.D. for not complying with the registration act. Captain America and Falcon help them escape, freeing Wiccan, allowing him to teleport the group to a base only known to Nick Fury and a few resistance fighters. Once in Captain America's secret base, the Young Avengers join the Secret Avengers, a resistance against Iron Man and the pro-registration heroes. Stature leaves the resistance after Goliath is killed by Ragnarok and the Secret Avengers are forced to retreat from battle, leaving Wiccan behind. Shortly afterwards, Stature registers and begins superhero training. The remainder of the team remain with Captain America.

With the surrender of Captain America, the rest of the Young Avengers are granted amnesty in exchange for registration. All the members except Hawkeye, Patriot, and Speed register and begin training at Camp Hammond. In She-Hulk #21, it is revealed that the Hulking and Wiccan who joined the Initiative were actually a pair of interdimensional travelers known as Alphas.

=== Young Avengers Presents ===
In the 2008 miniseries Young Avengers Presents, Patriot discovers that Bucky Barnes had visited his grandfather Isaiah Bradley. After tracking him down, Patriot shares his concerns losing faith in the country. Bucky explains to Eli that America is an idea used for good or ill, but one with value to it and something worth defending against all threat, inspiring the younger hero once more. Hulkling meets Mar-Vell, telling him that he is his son, much to Mar-Vell's shock. While Mar-Vell is proud of his son, he confesses that he will not be able to stay forever, as the survival of the time stream depends on him eventually returning to the past and dying from cancer. This Captain Marvel is later revealed to be Khn'nr, a Skrull sleeper agent who was impersonating Mar-Vell. Wiccan and Speed begin searching for the Scarlet Witch, whom they believe to be their mother. Upon searching the former home of the Scarlet Witch and Vision in Leonia, New Jersey; they encounter Master Pandemonium, who advises them to end their search and embrace their present lives. Vision tells Cassie Lang that after "Civil War", he traveled around the world posing as different people, living many different lives, ultimately culminating in a better understanding of who he is. He asserts that he is his own person, not the memories of Iron Lad, confessing his love to Cassie, and states that he wishes to now be called Jonas. Cassie demonstrates that she is unsure but is willing to reciprocate his feelings. During the story, Cassie is also stricken with guilt after accidentally injuring her stepfather while stopping a villain, forcing her to come to terms with the responsibilities that come with her powers and with being part of the Young Avengers and the Initiative, much as her stepfather also understands the risks of life as a policeman. Hawkeye feels uncomfortable about her growing relationship with Patriot, and encounters Clint Barton, the original Hawkeye, who helps her reaffirm her position as Hawkeye and Young Avengers co-leader.

=== "Secret Invasion" ===
In the 2008 miniseries Secret Invasion: Runaways/Young Avengers, the Young Avengers again teamed with the Runaways in a Secret Invasion tie-in. The Young Avengers are the first to respond to the Skrull invasion in Manhattan, New York. They are quickly defeated, though Xavin manages to rescue Hulkling. The leaders of the Skrull invasion intend to assassinate Hulking, for fear that his identity as Dorrek VIII would diminish their authority. During the confrontation between the Young Avengers, Runaways, and the invading Skrulls, Xavin is forced to confront her former mentor, Commander Chrell, reluctantly killing him to save the Young Avengers and Runaways.

=== "Dark Reign" ===
The 2009 Dark Reign: Young Avengers limited series written by Paul Cornell, and Mark Brooks, introduced a new group consist of Enchantress, Executioner, Coat of Arms, Egghead, Big Zero, and team leader Melter, who are powered teens calling themselves the Young Avengers. After Secret Invasion, all the Young Avengers remained under low profile during Norman Osborn's Dark Reign, who sent this version of Young Avengers and send them to battle only to fall against the original Young Avengers. They join forces with the genuine Young Avengers to battle Norman Osborn's Dark Avengers.

=== Avengers: The Children's Crusade ===
Promotional artwork for Avengers: The Children's Crusade

The Young Avengers appear in the 2010–2012 miniseries Avengers: The Children's Crusade, written by Allan Heinberg and illustrated by Jim Cheung. In the series, Magneto learned that the Young Avengers were going to search for the still missing Scarlet Witch, and that Wiccan and Speed may be the reincarnations of Wanda's children. Magneto meets them, stating that he wants Wiccan and Speed to finally know him as their grandfather, and helps them find Wanda.

The Avengers attempt to stop Magneto and fight him unsuccessfully, before Wiccan teleports Magneto and the Young Avengers to Mount Wundagore. There they encounter Quicksilver, who attempts to kill his father. However, they discover that this Scarlet Witch is actually a Doombot in disguise, prompting the Young Avengers and Magneto to journey to Latveria. Wiccan eventually finds the real Wanda, apparently devoid of her powers, amnesiac and engaged to be married to Doctor Doom. Wolverine tries to kill Wanda, but is prevented from doing so by the reappearance of Iron Lad. Iron Lad and the Young Avengers escape with Wanda into the timestream and land in the past when the resurrected Jack of Hearts destroys Avengers Mansion. The team escapes the explosion and involuntarily returns to the present due to Wanda, who has remembered everything. As an unexpected side effect, the life of Scott Lang is also saved. Scarlet Witch is convinced to restore the powers of Rictor, who was among the countless mutants who lost his powers to the Scarlet Witch's spell during the events of House of M.

A battle ensues between the X-Men and the Avengers over what to do with Wanda, forcing her and the Young Avengers to flee back to Doctor Doom. It is revealed that Wanda's enhanced powers were a result of her and Doom's combined attempt to channel the Life Force in order to resurrect her children, but it proved to be too much for Wanda to contain and overtook her. With Wiccan and Doom's help, they seek to use the entity possessing Wanda to restore mutantkind's powers but they are stopped by Patriot, only to find out that the entity was transferred to Doom's body, giving him Wanda's powers. In the ensuing battle, Doom kills Stature, causing the Young Avengers to disband.

=== Volume 2 ===
A new Young Avengers series, written by Kieron Gillen and drawn by Jamie McKelvie, was launched in January 2013 as part of the Marvel NOW! rebranding campaign. The new monthly series reintroduces existing Young Avengers, Wiccan, Hulkling and Hawkeye, as well as introducing Kid Loki, Noh-Varr and America Chavez to the book's cast. The series' sixth issue included the reintroduction of former Young Avenger, Speed, and the addition of depowered mutant Prodigy to the group. Over the course of the series, Wiccan and Hulkling reaffirm their commitment to one another after Hulkling faces an existential crisis; Wiccan discovers that he will one day become the all-powerful Demiurge; Prodigy comes out as bisexual, and develops a crush on Hulkling; Kate and Noh-Varr become a couple, and then later break up after Noh-Varr realises he does not feel as strongly for Kate as he does for his ex, Oubliette; and America Chavez is revealed to be from a dimension created by the Demiurge. In the latter half of the series, Kid Loki believes he is engaged in a battle of wits with against his ex, Leah. However, he later uncovers that this 'Leah' is in fact a projection of his own guilty conscience, which wants to restore Loki to his true self. After tricking Wiccan into transforming him to a more mature form—that of a late teenager or young adult—he departs the group, choosing to do so before they can forgive him for manipulating and betraying them. Throughout the story, the group are also haunted by a powerful character dressed as Patriot, who captures Tommy. In the concluding issue of the series, Prodigy rightly surmises that this Patriot is a member of the team who has been transformed into a non-human in some future magical event, and is now echoing backwards along the timeline in order to ensure this future comes to pass. Guessing this person may well be himself, he kisses Patriot, causing the Patriot to vanish and Tommy to reappear. Volume 2 came to an end with issue #15, as Gillen and McKelvie wrapped up their story and wanted to pursue other collaborations.

Thus the team again disbanded, after Hawkeye, America Chavez, and Noh-Varr joined West Coast Avengers, Wiccan and Speed focusing their relationships with Hulkling and Prodigy respectively.

== Members ==
Alias	Real name	Joined in	Notes
Iron Lad	Nathaniel "Nate" Richards	Young Avengers (vol. 1) #1	Team founder. Based on Iron Man, he is a time-travelling adolescent version of the supervillain Kang the Conqueror.
Patriot	Eli Bradley	Young Avengers (vol. 1) #1	Founding member. Based on Captain America's sidekick Bucky Barnes, he is later revealed to be the grandson of super-soldier Isaiah Bradley. Develops superpowers after receiving a blood transfusion from his grandfather.
Hulkling	Theodore "Teddy" Altman	Young Avengers (vol. 1) #1	Founding member. A shapeshifter with enhanced strength and healing, based on the Hulk. He is the son of the Kree hero Captain Marvel and the Skrull princess Anelle, and is in a romantic relationship with fellow Young Avenger Wiccan.
Wiccan	William "Billy" Kaplan	Young Avengers (vol. 1) #1	Founding member. A sorcerer with magical abilities, based on Thor and the Scarlet Witch. He and his twin brother Speed are the reincarnated sons of the Scarlet Witch and the original Vision.
Hawkeye	Katherine Elizabeth "Kate" Bishop	Young Avengers (vol. 1) #1	Team leader. A non-superpowered human who is highly adept with a bow and arrow, based on the original Hawkeye and Mockingbird.
Stature	Cassandra "Cassie" Lang	Young Avengers (vol. 1) #2	The daughter of Scott Lang, the second Ant-Man, who possesses the power to change size at will.
Vision	Jonas	Young Avengers (vol. 1) #9	An android created from the programming of the original Vision and the armor and brain patterns of Iron Lad. Killed by Iron Lad during Avengers: The Children's Crusade.
Speed	Thomas "Tommy" Shepherd	Young Avengers (vol. 1) #12	The reincarnated son of the Scarlet Witch and the original Vision. Possesses the superhuman speed of his maternal uncle Quicksilver.
Miss America	America Chavez	Young Avengers (vol. 2) #1	Possesses super-strength and the ability to create portals between dimensions.
Kid Loki	Loki	Young Avengers (vol. 2) #1	The Asgardian god Loki, adoptive brother to Thor, who integrates himself into the team after being reincarnated as a child.
Marvel Boy	Noh-Varr	Young Avengers (vol. 2) #1	A superpowered Kree hero. Joins the Young Avengers after initially appearing as a brainwashed antagonist to the team in Civil War: Young Avengers/Runaways.
Prodigy	David Alleyne	Young Avengers (vol. 2) #6	A former member of the X-Men. Lost his mutant ability to absorb the knowledge and skills following the events of House of M, but remains in possession of the knowledge that he has already absorbed.

== Development and production ==
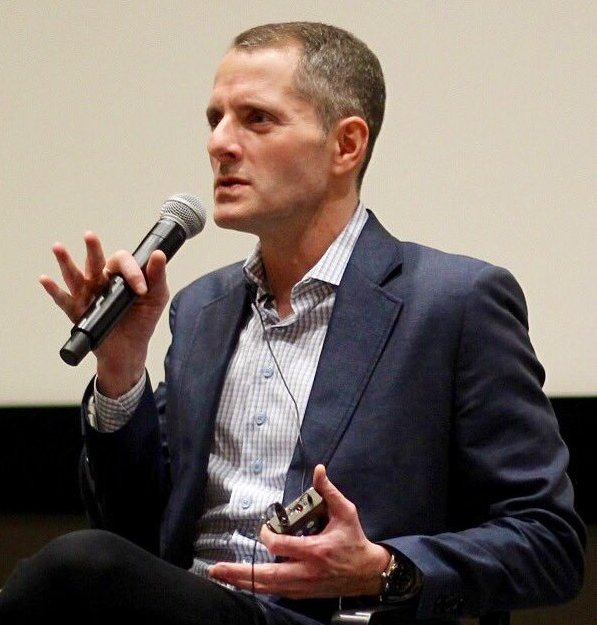
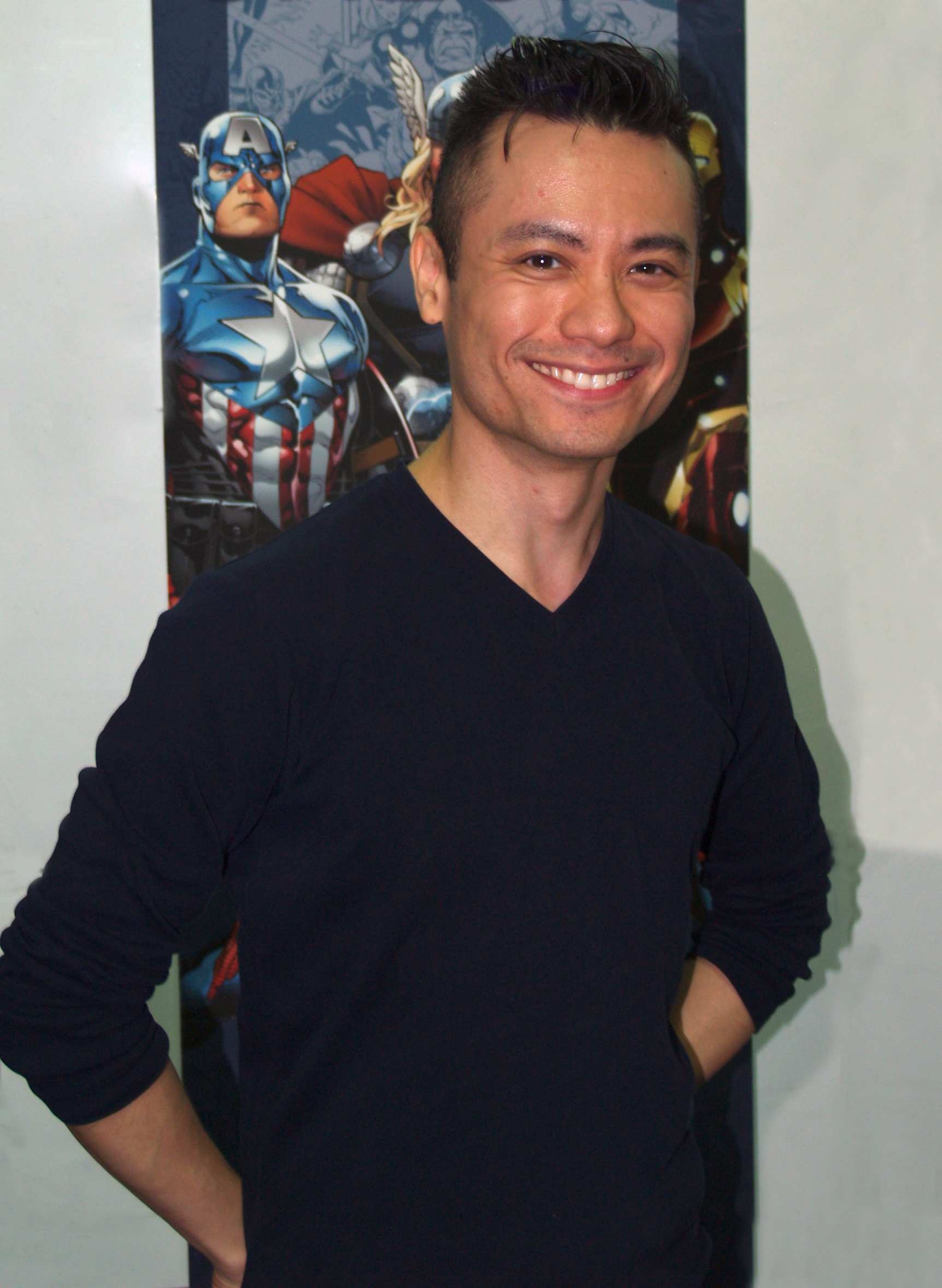
The Young Avengers were created by writer Allan Heinberg (left) and artist Jim Cheung (right), who also authored the first volume of the series and Avengers: The Children's Crusade.

Prior to co-creating Young Avengers, Allan Heinberg was a writer and producer for The O.C., a teen drama television series. Heinberg was approached by Marvel about developing a comic book series for the company after giving an interview with the magazine Wizard, where he discussed the influence of comic books on The O.C. and the series' depiction of them. Young Avengers would become the first comic book that Heinberg would author. Owing to Heinberg's scheduling commitments as a television writer, the series was conceived as a 12-issue limited series rather than an ongoing series, which Heinberg likened to creating a season of a television series. Jim Cheung was the only artist considered for the series, with Heinberg praising his ability to illustrate "big, widescreen, comic book action scenes, as well as intimate, emotional character scenes".

Heinberg, who is gay, initially assumed that Marvel would not permit him to include gay characters in the series. Consequently, early drafts of Hulkling conceived of the character as a female shapeshifter named Chimera who would discover that her true form was male; this would prompt Wiccan to be forced to decide whether to stay in the relationship, which Heinberg described as "a very long, convoluted way to sneak a gay love story into a mainstream Marvel comic". After editor Tom Brevoort suggested that the story could be simplified by making both characters gay, the character's origin was revised to Heinberg's original vision. Heinberg described the process of creating a gay character in a mainstream comic as ultimately "far easier" than creating a gay character in a mainstream television series, which he ascribed to the lower budgets (and thus lower financial risk) of comic books. Heinberg reported that a majority of the letters to the editor about the series' gay subject material were positive, with "only one or two" that were "blatantly homophobic".

Marvel comics editor-in-chief Axel Alonso offered writer Kieron Gillen the second volume of Young Avengers on the basis of his previous work at Marvel, particularly Generation Hope (2011). Gillen chose his frequent collaborator Jamie McKelvie as the artist for the series; Young Avengers was McKelvie's first ongoing serialized comic for the company, having previously worked for the company as a fill-in artist and on graphic novels. Mike Norton provided additional artwork, while Matt Wilson served as colorist and Clayton Cowles served as letterer. The second volume was edited by Lauren Sankovitch, who described Young Avengers as "a book that I felt very strongly about and demanded", and who had previously worked with Gillen as the editor of his run on Journey Into Mystery in 2009.

In 2019, Heinberg and Cheung reunited to author "The Celebration Dinner", a Young Avengers story in Marvel Comics #1000. The issue is an anthology of eighty single-page stories by eighty creative teams, released to mark the 80th anniversary of Marvel Comics.

== Reception ==
=== Awards ===
The Young Avengers comic book series won the 2006 Harvey Award for Best New Series. It won the 2006 and 2014 GLAAD Media Awards for Outstanding Comic Book.

=== Critical reception ===
Bryan Joel of IGN gave Young Avengers Presents #1 a grade of 8 out of 10, saying, "Paco Medina lends his pencils to this issue and while I've never been the biggest fan of his work, this might be the best and most polished I've ever seen it. His oddly-proportioned faces pop up here and there but his Patriot is uniformly great-looking, which is the most important part. I have a feeling we won't be getting any answers to the big questions from Young Avengers Presents, like status quo and membership post-Civil War, but when the proper series does eventually start up again, fans will probably have a heightened appreciation for its stars."

Kelly Thompson of CBR.com called Young Avengers #1 "incredibly satisfying, innovative and touching," asserting, "There's such passion and even conviction in what Gillen and McKelvie are doing on this book. It's easy feel the love and care on these pages, which is something mainstream comics don't have nearly enough of. With books like "Young Avengers" leading the pack, Marvel NOW! is shaping up to be one hell of an interesting line." Marc Buxton of Den of Geek gave Young Avengers #1 a grade of 10 out of 10, writing, "So, if you’re one of those readers who complain that they have seen it all before and that mainstream comics have become predictable, you owe it to yourself to experience Young Avengers. This is the book that will define the craft for generations to come, and Marvel deserves credit for seeing the potential the creative team has with these characters. Gillen and McKelvie are clearly worthy of the legacy that is Young Avengers."

=== Commercial reception ===
According to Diamond Comic Distributors, Young Avengers Presents #1 was the 44th best selling comic book in January 2008. while Young Avengers #1 (2013) was the 18th best selling comic book in January 2013.

== Other versions ==
=== Ultimate Marvel ===
The Ultimate Marvel reality featured an Earth-1610 version of the Young Avengers called the Young Ultimates. They consist of Spider-Man (Miles Morales), Black Widow, Bombshell (Lana Baumgartner), Cloak and Dagger, and Kitty Pryde.

=== What If? ===
In 2008, a story titled "What If the Runaways Became the Young Avengers?" ran as a back-up story through five What If? issues. The feature illustrates what would have happened if Iron Lad never found out about the Avengers Fail-Safe Program. Instead, he recruits the Runaways, forcing them to be an actual superhero team with costumes. Although it is later revealed that the Iron Lad that brought them together was actually Victor Mancha—Iron Lad ran into Victor's future self when attempting to flee to the Avengers' era, with Victorious travelling back with him and using Victor to hi-jack his equipment—Kang's attempt to rescue his younger self results in Iron Lad being killed and Kang being erased from history while Victor destroys his future self and departs via Kang's time-belt to find his own way, leaving the Runaways to continue as Young Avengers. It was written by C.B. Cebulski, and drawn by Patrick "Spaz" Spaziante.

== In other media ==
- Following the individual introductions of multiple Young Avengers members from the comics in Phases Four and Five of the Marvel Cinematic Universe (MCU), media outlets speculated that Marvel Studios was building towards a team-up film or series based on the Young Avengers. Speaking about the possibility of this, Marvel Studios president Kevin Feige said with the new characters being introduced in Phase Four, "the potential [was] endless". Elizabeth Olsen, who portrays Wanda Maximoff in the franchise, stated that she had "no idea" of any plans for such a project, although she believed that it "could be a possibility".
- The Young Avengers appear as unlockable playable characters in Lego Marvel's Avengers, consisting of Kate Bishop, Hulkling, Wiccan, Speed, and America Chavez.

== Collected editions ==
The stories have been collected into a number of volumes:

Title	Material collected	Publication date	ISBN
Allen Heinberg and Jim Cheung
Volume 1: Sidekicks	Young Avengers (vol. 1) #1–6	Feb 2006	0-7851-1470-X
Volume 2: Family Matters	Young Avengers (vol. 1) #7–12; Young Avengers Special	Nov 2006	0-7851-2021-1
Young Avengers	Young Avengers (vol. 1) #1–12; Young Avengers Special	Feb 2008	0-7851-3033-0
Young Avengers Ultimate Collection	Young Avengers (vol. 1) #1–12; Young Avengers Special	Jul 2010	978-0785149071
Young Avengers by Allen Heinberg and Jim Cheung: The Complete Collection	Young Avengers (vol. 1) #1–12; Young Avengers Special	Dec 2016	978-1302905194
Civil War: Young Avengers & Runaways	Civil War: Young Avengers & Runaways #1–4	May 2007	0-7851-2317-2
Young Avengers Presents	Young Avengers Presents #1–6	Oct 2008	0-7851-2975-8
Secret Invasion: Runaways/Young Avengers	Secret Invasion: Runaways/Young Avengers #1–3	Mar 2009	0-7851-3266-X
Runaways: The Complete Collection Volume 3	Civil War: Young Avengers And Runaways #1–4, Runaways vol. 2 #19–30, Runaways Saga, Secret Invasion: Runaways/Young Avengers #1–3	Mar 2015	978-0-7851-8917-6
Dark Reign: Young Avengers	Dark Reign: Young Avengers #1–5	Jan 2010	0-7851-3909-5
Siege: Battlefield	Siege: Spider-Man; Young Avengers; Loki; Captain America; Secret Warriors	Aug 2010	978-0-7851-4598-1
Avengers: The Children's Crusade	Uncanny X-Men #526 (B-Story); Avengers: The Children's Crusade #1–9; Avengers: The Children's Crusade – Young Avengers #1	Mar 2012	978-0785136385
Young Avengers: The Children's Crusade	Avengers: The Children's Crusade #1–9; Avengers: The Children's Crusade – Young Avengers #1; material from Uncanny X-Men #526	Jun 2017	978-1302908751
Young Avengers By Heinberg & Cheung Omnibus	Young Avengers (vol. 1) #1–12, Young Avengers Special, Civil War: Young Avengers & Runaways #1–4, Young Avengers Presents #1–6, Secret Invasion: Runaways/Young Avengers #1–3, Dark Reign: Young Avengers #1–5, Siege: Young Avengers #1, Avengers: The Children's Crusade #1–9, Avengers: The Children's Crusade – Young Avengers #1, Young Avengers #1 Director's Cut, material from Uncanny X-Men #526	August 23, 2022	978-1302933890
Kieron Gillen and Jamie McKelvie
Young Avengers Vol. 1: Style > Substance	Young Avengers (vol. 2) #1–5, Marvel Now! Point One #1 (Young Avengers story)	Sep 2013	978-0785167082
Young Avengers Vol. 2: Alternative Cultures	Young Avengers (vol. 2) #6–10	Feb 2014	978-0785167099
Young Avengers Vol. 3: Mic-Drop at the Edge of Time and Space	Young Avengers (vol. 2) #11–15	Apr 2014	978-0785185307
Young Avengers by Kieron Gillen & Jamie McKelvie Omnibus	Young Avengers (vol. 2) #1–15; material from Marvel Now! Point One #1 (Young Avengers Story)	Dec 2014	978-0785191711
Young Avengers by Gillen & McKelvie: The Complete Collection	Young Avengers (vol. 2) #1–15; material from Marvel Now! Point One #1 (Young Avengers Story)	December 8, 2020	978-1302925680
