= Vision (comics) =

Vision is the name of three fictional characters from Marvel Comics. The original character originated in Marvel's predecessor Timely Comics and is depicted as an extra-dimensional law enforcement officer; the latter two are humanoid androids. The original first appeared in Marvel Mystery Comics #13 in 1940.

== Vision (Aarkus) ==
The original Vision first appeared in Marvel Mystery Comics #13 by Timely Comics by Joe Simon and Jack Kirby.

== Vision (Victor Shade) ==
A character loosely based on the original, the Vision was created in 1968 by Roy Thomas, Stan Lee and John Buscema. He is the best-known version of the character, having made several appearances in other media and the Marvel Cinematic Universe franchise.

== Vision (Jonas) ==
Vision
- The Vision, as he appears as a member of the Young Avengers. Art by Jim Cheung.

Publication information
- Publisher: Marvel Comics
- First appearance: Young Avengers #5 (August 2005)
- Created by: Allan Heinberg; Jim Cheung

In-story information
- Species: Android
- Team affiliations: Young Avengers; Mighty Avengers
- Notable aliases: Jonas
- Abilities: Superhuman agility, intelligence, strength and speed; Flight; Density control; Intangibility; Shapeshifting; Time travel; Mass manipulation; Regeneration; Solar energy projection; Technopathy

The Vision (Jonas) is a fictional superhero appearing in American comic books published by Marvel Comics. The character first appears in Young Avengers #5, and is the third character and second android character published by Marvel with the superhero name Vision. He is a combination of the original android Vision's program files and the armor and brain patterns of Iron Lad.

=== Publication history ===
Vision first appeared in Young Avengers #5 (August 2005) and was created by Allan Heinberg and Jim Cheung.

The exact details of the character's personality and nature vary from writer to writer. While some writers, such as Heinberg and Dan Slott, write him as an entirely new character, other writers like Brian Michael Bendis (during the "Collective" storyline) and Ed Brubaker (in Captain America: Reborn) depict him as the original Vision in a new body, or at least having access to the original Vision's memories.

=== Fictional character biography ===
The Vision is a fusion of the old Vision's operating systems and the armor of Iron Lad, a teenage version of Kang the Conqueror who arrives in the present. Through this merger, Iron Lad is able to access plans the Vision had created in the event of the Avengers' defeat. He uses these plans to assemble a new team of "Young Avengers". When Iron Lad is forced to remove his armor to stop Kang the Conqueror from tracking him, Vision's operating system causes the armor to become a sentient being. When Iron Lad leaves the time period, he leaves the armor behind with Vision's operating system activated.

Vision opts to stay with the Young Avengers and serve as a mentor for them, in part due to his feeling towards Cassie Lang. After the events of the "Civil War" storyline, Vision travels the world posing as different people in order to gain a better understanding of who he is. He then finds Cassie and declares his love, and states he has adopted the name "Jonas".

He joins the new lineup of the Mighty Avengers, along with Stature. They opt to keep their dual memberships in the Avengers and the Young Avengers a secret to hunt down the Scarlet Witch (really Loki in disguise). They ultimately tell their teammates this when Loki reveals his impersonation of the Scarlet Witch and confront him. When the Mighty Avengers disband following the events of "Siege", Vision and Cassie rejoin the Young Avengers full-time.

In Avengers: Children's Crusade, Cassie is killed by Doctor Doom, and Iron Lad decides to take her body into the future to be revived. Vision protests, reasoning that such an action is more in line with Kang's manipulation of time than what Cassie would want, but is destroyed by Iron Lad. Although Vision's teammates contemplate rebuilding him, they decide against it, both because they lack the technology to do so and because, even with their access to his back-ups, the lack of a back-up immediately prior to his death would mean that they would have to tell him about Cassie's death again.

=== Powers and abilities ===
Vision is able to use Iron Lad's neuro-kinetic armor to recreate the former Vision's abilities, including superhuman strength, density manipulation, and flight. The yellow solar cell on his forehead can also emit a beam of infrared and microwave radiation. He is also capable of energy and holographic manipulation, shapeshifting and time travel.
