= Hulkling =

Marvel Comics superhero

- Hulkling as depicted in Empyre #1 (April 2020); Art by Jeff Dekal.

Publication information
- Publisher: Marvel Comics
- First appearance: Young Avengers #1 (April 2005)
- Created by: Allan Heinberg (writer); Jim Cheung (artist)

In-story information
- Alter ego: Teddy Altman; Dorrek VIII (regnal name)
- Species: Kree/Skrull hybrid
- Place of origin: Tarnax IV
- Team affiliations: Young Avengers; New Avengers; Kree–Skrull Alliance (as Emperor); Guardians of the Galaxy; Avengers
- Partnerships: Billy Kaplan / Wiccan (husband)
- Notable aliases: Theodore "Teddy" Altman; Emperor Hulkling; Dorrek Supreme; King of Space; Cosmic King
- Abilities: Accelerated healing factor; Biological pheromone immunity; Metamorphic adaptation; Superhuman strength; Shapeshifting; Wields Star Sword; Excelsior

Hulkling is a superhero appearing in American comic books published by Marvel Comics. A member of the Young Avengers superhero team in the Marvel Universe, Hulkling's visual design is patterned on the Hulk. In addition to being superhumanly strong, he possesses shapeshifting abilities that go far beyond the ability to mimic the Hulk, which give him the power to fly.

Hulkling was created in 2005 as part of a new series, Young Avengers, whose characters would all share common motifs with existing characters from Marvel's popular Avengers team. While Hulkling was patterned on Hulk, he is later revealed to be the son of the Kree superhero Captain Marvel and the Skrull princess Anelle. As the heir to the Skrull throne, he was raised on Earth for his own safety under the human identity Theodore "Teddy" Altman.

Hulkling's creators originally considered creating a female character before deciding that Young Avengers offered them an opportunity to increase LGBT representation at Marvel, leading to his high-profile romantic pairing with his teammate Wiccan. The character was immediately popular with audiences and critics, with the pair becoming lauded by some as "Marvel's most popular gay couple". Since the time of their introduction, the characters have been at the centre of important Marvel company-wide crossover stories such as Avengers: The Children's Crusade and Empyre. The latter story saw Hulkling marry his long-time partner Wiccan, as well as bringing an end to the Kree–Skrull War, a mainstay of the Marvel Universe since 1971. He ultimately accepts the crown of the Kree-Skrull Alliance and the regnal name of Emperor Dorrek VIII.

== Publication history ==
Hulkling was created by writer Allan Heinberg and artist Jim Cheung and first was in Young Avengers #1 (April 2005) along with other teenage heroes patterned after founding Avengers members.

Hulkling was originally planned to be a female character. According to Tom Brevoort, "Originally, Allan pitched Hulkling as a female character using her shape-changing abilities to pose as a man. I suspect this was as close as Allan felt he could get to depicting an openly gay relationship in a Marvel comic. But as we got underway... he started to have second thoughts and approached me about maintaining Hulkling and Wiccan as two involved male characters".

He was also featured in Civil War: Young Avengers/Runaways and appeared in the Civil War crossover event. Hulkling then appeared in the 2013 Young Avengers series by Kieron Gillen and Jamie McKelvie, and appeared with Wiccan in New Avengers as part of All-New All-Different Marvel.

Most recently, Hulkling was a key player in Empyre, Marvel's summer 2020 crossover event. A one-shot, Lords of Empyre: Emperor Hulkling, written by Chip Zdarsky and queer author Anthony Oliveira, fills in some of the events that led to Hulkling becoming emperor and his relationship with Wiccan.

In April 2021, Hulkling and Wiccan became members of the Guardians of the Galaxy, beginning with Guardians of the Galaxy #13 by Al Ewing, Juan Frigeri, and Brett Booth.

== Fictional character biography ==
Teddy in Young Avengers Vol. 1, #9 (December 2005) Art by Jim Cheung.

=== Young Avengers Vol. 1 ===
In his first appearance, little is revealed about Hulkling except for the fact he is raised by a single mother. All this changes when the shapeshifting extraterrestrial known as the Super-Skrull appears, stating that Teddy is a Skrull. The Super-Skrull is surprised to learn that Teddy has super strength and wonders "perhaps the rumors about his father are true." The Super-Skrull follows the Young Avengers to Wiccan's house, where Teddy's mother is waiting for him. The Super-Skrull releases a device designed to turn Teddy into his true form in an attempt to prove his Skrull heritage. While the device does not change Teddy's physical appearance, his mother is also caught in the device's beam and is exposed as a Skrull. When the Super-Skrull accuses her of being a traitor to her race, she responds by saying that the Empress ordered her to protect Teddy, even from the likes of the Super-Skrull, pulling out a gun. The Super-Skrull responds by killing her, though it was unintentional.

The Super-Skrull reveals that years ago during the Kree-Skrull War, he kidnapped Mar-Vell, Quicksilver, and the Scarlet Witch, presenting them to the Skrull emperor Dorrek VII. Though the heroes later escaped, the Emperor's daughter Anelle conceived a child with Mar-Vell. At birth, the child was marked for death by Dorrek VII. Anelle ordered her chambermaid to take the child to Earth, assuming Mar-Vell would be there to care for him. Unable to find the hero, the chambermaid took on a human identity and chose to raise Teddy as her own son.

The Super-Skrull reveals that his intention is to bring Teddy back to the Empire so that he may unify his people. Kree soldiers arrive to take Teddy as one of their own. A battle erupts between the Kree and the Skrull. Teddy ends the conflict by surrendering himself. It is settled that Teddy will spend half an Earth-year with the Kree and the other half with the Skrull, at which time he will declare his ultimate allegiance. The "Teddy" that left Earth is actually the Super-Skrull in disguise. The real Teddy remains on Earth.

=== Civil War ===
Along with the rest of his team, Hulkling sides with Secret Avengers against the Superhuman Registration Act during the Civil War storyline. He plays a pivotal role in Captain America's plan for the final confrontation with Iron Man's forces, impersonating Yellowjacket to free the imprisoned heroes in Negative Zone Prison Alpha.

=== Meeting Captain Marvel ===
Hulkling contacts the mysteriously revived Captain Marvel to confront him about his identity as Mar-Vell's son. Mar-Vell confirms the Super Skrull's story concerning Teddy's origins and that he could be Teddy's father, though he was unaware of Teddy's existence because he and the Skrull Princess Anelle never saw each other again. Mar-Vell comforts a frustrated Teddy, who is upset at Mar-Vell's intention to return to the past, expressing an interest in spending more time with him before he dies. Later, Teddy asserts that he never saw Mar-Vell alive again.

Teddy exhibits frustration with being essentially orphaned during the events of "Family Matters" and his hopes of establishing a father-son relationship with Mar-Vell, his last remaining parent. Later storylines reveal that the "revived" Captain Marvel was a Skrull imposter named Khn'nr, intended by Skrull scientists to impersonate Mar-Vell. Due to his mental programming malfunctioning, the Skrull believed himself to be Mar-Vell.

In the Children's Crusade: Young Avengers one-shot, a future version of Teddy is shown to have taken up the mantle of Captain Marvel wearing a version of his father's classic costume with the white and green coloring of his original Kree uniform.

=== Secret Invasion ===
The Young Avengers confront a group of rampaging super-powered Skrulls. Hulkling tries to use his Skrull heritage to calm them, but is instead battered down with energy blasts. It was revealed that Veranke and a few higher up in position of the invasion specifically ordered Teddy's death without informing the soldiers of his royal heritage, for fear that it could confuse and divide the loyalties of their soldiers. Teddy is saved from execution at the last second by Xavin. With the aid of Xavin, Speed and Wiccan, Hulkling survives an attack by X'iv, a Skrull assassin working for Chrell with the powers of Daredevil, Elektra, and Cloak and Dagger.

Later, a Skrull reveals to Hulkling, Wiccan, and Hawkeye that taking over the Earth was the last chance they had since all their planets have been destroyed.

=== Original Sins ===
Hulkling is featured in the Original Sins mini-series as part of the Original Sin storyline. With his friends Marvel Boy (Noh-Varr) and Prodigy (David Alleyne), Hulkling tries to save innocent people from being overwhelmed by cosmic secrets that are driving them insane.

=== All-New, All-Different Marvel ===
As part of the All-New, All-Different Marvel event, Hulkling (alongside Wiccan) became a member of Sunspot's New Avengers. Eventually, a small group of Kree–Skrull hybrids arrive on Earth and kidnap Teddy so that he can assume his position as king and unite the two warring alien races. Teddy gains the sword of the prior king and uses it to defeat ghost wizard Moridun but announces that he has commitments to protect Earth and will return to fulfill his destiny if and when he is ready. Later, he manages to rescue Billy who was taken over by Moridun by convincing him to fight.

=== Empyre ===
Teddy later accepts his heritage and the mantle of "Dorrek VIII", and, at the cost of leaving Billy, becomes the new ruler of the Kree–Skrull Alliance, upon which he begins preparations to invade Earth for "the final war". This was further depicted when Raksor and Bel-Dann visit Teddy during his trip to Krakoa, intending him to bring the Kree and the Skrull to an alliance to combat a growing threat on the Moon. Their meeting is crashed by Skrull soldiers, who call them heretics. A fight breaks out until Teddy grabs the Sword of Space, which frightens the Skrulls. After being transported to the Imperial Flagship, Hulkling meets with Tanalth the Translator, who names him Dorrek VIII of the newly-founded Kree–Skrull Alliance. Tanalth introduces the royal guards who will be working for Hulkling, including Captain Glory and the Kree–Skrull sorceress. When the latest member is revealed to be Super-Skrull, Hulkling punches him for what he did to his mother. Super-Skrull stated that he actually killed the chambermaid who raised him after absconding him from Princess Anelle, which he now regrets. After breaking up the argument, Tanalth explains that the Kree and Skrull fleets are proceeding to the Titan stargate near Saturn. Hulkling visits Mar-Vell's grave, where he states that his mother has told him about Mar-Vell's heroics. Hulkling breaks ties with Wiccan, who states that he will be on Earth when he returns.

As well as setting Hulkling up for the Empyre event, Lords of Empyre: Emperor Hulkling also shows the importance of Hulkling's relationship with Wiccan. Co-author Anthony Oliveira also found it important to depict them both having fuller queer lives independent of one another. Oliveira had previously shown the couple having a queer everyday life with Wiccan going to a drag brunch with Loki, with Hulkling lounging at home. The events of Emperor Hulkling start at a drag bar, where Hulkling is drinking with fellow Young Avengers Prodigy and Speed, who are also depicted as a couple.

== Powers and abilities ==
Hulkling is the extraterrestrial hybrid offspring of an enhanced Kree warrior, Captain Marvel, and Skrull royalty, Princess Anelle, resulting in various abilities derived from the unique combination of his parents' genetic material. His powers exceed those of ordinary individuals of either race; they most likely are much stronger than those of other potential hybrids due to his father's various enhancements prior to Hulkling's conception. His shape-shifting and accelerated healing factor derive from his Skrull heritage, while his superhuman strength originates from his enhanced Kree background.

His shape-shifting abilities allow him to impersonate others, independently alter parts of his body, and manifest different physical abilities. For example, he can form claws, extend his reach, create body armor, and grow wings (which enable him to fly). Hulkling can use his shapeshifting to increase his body's density and composition, giving him a very strong resistance to pain and injury. He is able to withstand great impact forces, such as falls from great heights, repeated bludgeoning from superhumanly strong beings, and powerful energy blasts without sustaining injury. High caliber bullets and bladed weapons are also unable to pierce his skin. Hulkling's shapeshifting also demonstrated the ability to operate without his conscious thought to protect himself from injury; his body shifted its biomass to protect vital organs, while the warden of the Cube was attempting to vivisect him in Civil War: Young Avengers/Runaways.

His healing factor allows him to heal wounds quickly, but not on a scale with Wolverine or Hulk. Hulkling's alien anatomy also prevents him from being controlled by pheromone-based powers, such as those used by Daken.

In later stories, Teddy obtains Excelsior, a mystical cosmic sword used by the Skrull royal lineage. Its wielder, as unmitigated ruler of both Kree and Skrull and Lord of the Knights of Infinity, is entitled to inherit rulership of the entire cosmos. Its skin alone has arcane abilities such as negating and absorbing magic as well as canceling out eldritch entities (i.e., an entity from the universe before the present one) using its knife edge.

== Reception ==
=== Critical reception ===
Allan Heinberg reported that when the relationship between Hulkling and Wiccan was initially suspected before its confirmation, most fans were supportive, with minimal negative reaction. Hulkling and Wiccan have been called "Marvel's most prominent gay couple," and received praise for showing diversity and progression in comics. While accepting the Corporate Vanguard Award for Marvel Entertainment at the Los Angeles LGBT Center, Marvel's VP of Animation Development, Cort Lane, cited Hulkling and Wiccan's relationship as one of his favorite story lines featuring LGBT characters.

Andrew Wheeler of ComicsAlliance wrote, "Something about the sweetness of the love between Hulkling and Wiccan, aka Billy and Teddy, has struck a strong chord with readers looking for a little romance to melt their hearts. After dealing with time travellers, alien invasions and mad mutants, their story stands out as an It Gets Better for the superhero set." M.N Negus of CBR.com referred to Hulkling and Wiccan as "one of Marvel's most iconic LGBT+ couples," writing, "Wiccan and Hulkling have been together for nearly two decades, and are now living happily ever after. Their recent exploits are depicted in Hulkling and Wiccan Infinity Comic #1 (by writer Josh Trujillo and artists Jodi Nishijima, Matt Milla, and VC's Ariana Maher), in which they even explore a life without the other. Throughout their struggles as individuals and as a couple, they manage to come out on top with their bond becoming stronger than before. Their coupling has withstood the test of time and truly become an iconic development in Marvel comic books." Eric Diaz of Nerdist stated, "Marvel Comics took a big and necessary step into the 21st century today, as they announced the very first marriage between two LGBTQ superheroes will soon take place in their pages. The event occurs in Empyre: Avengers Aftermath #1, which will feature the union of longtime superhero couple Hulkling and Wiccan. Both heroes are famous for being founding members of the Young Avengers."

The Drag Brunch with Loki one-shot, the Empyre series and the coda one-shot Empyre: Aftermath Avengers jointly won the GLAAD Media Award for Outstanding Comic Book on April 8, 2021.

=== Accolades ===
- In 2012, ComicsAlliance ranked Hulkling and Wiccan 6th in their "50 Comics and Characters that Resonate with LGBT Readers" list.
- In 2018, Nerdist included Hulkling in their "12 Avengers from the Comics Who We'd Still Love to See on the Big Screen" list.
- In 2019, CBR.com ranked Hulkling 4th in their "The 5 Most Powerful Young Avengers (& The 5 Weakest)" list.
- In 2020, CBR.com ranked Hulkling 1st in their "Marvel Comics: 10 Most Powerful Teen Heroes In Marvel Comics" list.
- In 2021, Screen Rant ranked Hulkling and Wiccan 2nd in their "10 Best Relationships in Avengers Comics" list and ranked Hukling 2nd in their "10 Most Powerful Members Of The Young Avengers" list.
- In 2022, CBR.com ranked Hulkling and Wiccan 5th in their "10 Best Marvel Couples" list and 7th in their "10 Healthiest Marvel Couples" list.

== Literary reception ==
=== Volumes ===
==== Hulkling & Wiccan - 2022 ====
Hannah Rose of CBR.com called Hulkling and Wiccan #1 an "interesting love story", writing, "Instead of budding romance, it tells the story of a pair of newly-weds who have known each other for quite a while. By the time this story begins, Hulkling and Wiccan are already enjoying domestic bliss. But before they can settle into life as a married couple, they're forced to adjust to the responsibilities of their new royal positions. It's clear from their serious discussions and their playful banter that these two care for each other. But, Hulkling and Wiccan #1 reminds the audience that Teddy and Billy are both very young, very insecure, and very uncertain about their place in space. Their arguments and insecurities are realistically and excellently written." Jenna Anderson of ComicBook.com gave Hulkling and Wiccan #1 a grade of 3 out of 5, saying, "One of the most beloved LGBTQ+ couples in Marvel's arsenal gets the spotlight again, with a one-shot (reprinting the first portion of the digital Infinity Comic of the same name) that puts Wiccan and Hulkling's newfound married life to the test. To say any more beyond that would spoil (and probably complicate) the specifics of what is laid out, with the two being put through a crucible that will only make them further realize their bond. Some fans of the couple will surely love it, while some won't — but there's definitely a fun sense of artistry on display, particularly with Jodi Nishijima's art and Matt Milla's dreamy colors. Diehard fans of Billy and Teddy will surely want to add this to their collection, but this isn't a must-read on a larger level."

== Other versions ==
=== Avengers Fairy Tales ===
An alternate universe version of Hulkling from Earth-88183, based on the Mad Hatter, appears in the one-shot Avengers Fairy Tales.

=== Earth-A ===
An alternate dimension version of Hulkling from Earth-A appears as one of the 142 superhumans who are registered in Avengers: The Initiative.

=== Earth-15061 ===
An alternate universe version of Hulkling from Earth-15061 appears in New Avengers (vol. 4) #5 as a member of the Avengers.

=== Marvel Zombies ===
An alternate universe version of Hulkling from Earth-2149 appears in Marvel Zombies vs. The Army of Darkness #3.

== In other media ==
- Hulkling appears as a playable character in Lego Marvel's Avengers, voiced by Scott Whyte.
- Hulkling appears as a playable character in Lego Marvel Super Heroes 2.
- Hulkling appears in Marvel: Future Fight.
- Hulkling appears in Marvel Avengers Academy.
- Hulkling appears as a playable character in Marvel Puzzle Quest.
- Hulkling appears as a playable character in Marvel Contest of Champions.
- Hulkling appears in Marvel Snap.
- Agatha All Along showrunner Jac Schaeffer revealed that in early drafts of the series, Billy Maximoff / William Kaplan's boyfriend Eddie (played by Miles Gutierrez-Riley) was originally named Teddy. Marvel Studios opted not to pivot to Eddie being revealed as Hulkling.

== See also ==
- LGBT themes in comics
