= Lego Marvel's Avengers =

2016 video game

- Developers: Traveller's Tales; TT Fusion (handheld)
- Publishers: Warner Bros. Interactive Entertainment; Feral Interactive (OS X)
- Director: Arthur Parsons
- Producers: Jennifer Burbeck; Toby Jennings
- Designer: Jon Burton
- Programmer: Steve Harding
- Artist: Leon Warren
- Composers: Rob Westwood; Ian Livingstone; Alan Silvestri (Captain America: The First Avenger and The Avengers); Brian Tyler (Iron Man 3, Thor: The Dark World, and Avengers: Age of Ultron); Rob Westwood (LEGO Marvel Super Heroes); Danny Elfman (Avengers: Age of Ultron)
- Platforms: Nintendo 3DS; PlayStation 3; PlayStation 4; PlayStation Vita; Wii U; Windows; Xbox 360; Xbox One; OS X
- Release: NA: 26 January 2016; PAL: 27 January 2016; UK: 29 January 2016; OS X: WW: 10 March 2016
- Genre: Action-adventure
- Modes: Single-player, multiplayer

Lego Marvel's Avengers is a 2016 Lego-themed action-adventure video game developed by Traveller's Tales and published by Warner Bros. Interactive Entertainment, for the Nintendo 3DS, PlayStation 3, PlayStation 4, PlayStation Vita, Wii U, Windows, Xbox 360, Xbox One, and OS X. It is the spin-off to Lego Marvel Super Heroes and the second installment of the Lego Marvel franchise. The game is based on the Marvel Cinematic Universe, primarily following the plots of The Avengers and Avengers: Age of Ultron, with single levels based on Captain America: The First Avenger, Iron Man 3, Thor: The Dark World, and Captain America: The Winter Soldier.

The game features characters from the Marvel Cinematic Universe as well as characters from comic books. Characters include Iron Man, Captain America, Hulk, Black Widow, Hawkeye, Scarlet Witch, Quicksilver, Thor, Ultron, Loki, Winter Soldier, Falcon, Vision, and War Machine, as well as lesser-known characters such as Devil Dinosaur and Fin Fang Foom. It includes the characters of the Avengers, a superhero team, along with many others. The game was released on 26 January 2016 and received mixed reviews, with many calling it inferior to its predecessor.

== Gameplay ==
The gameplay is similar to Lego's long-running series of franchise video games, with a focus on puzzle-solving interspersed with action. Players have to solve puzzles spread across the game environment to progress through levels. The game features New York City as the main large open-world hub, but also, for the first time, includes seven other movie significant areas players can travel to, including Asgard, Malibu, South Africa, the Helicarrier, the Bartons' farm, Washington, D.C., and Sokovia. These hubs also feature hundreds of side quests and bonus levels such as rescuing citizens in trouble and races. While the game's story is predominantly focused on the first two Avengers films, there are single levels based on Captain America: The First Avenger, Iron Man 3, Thor: The Dark World, and Captain America: The Winter Soldier.

=== Characters ===
The game features over two hundred playable characters, with most characters (excluding Fantastic Four and X-Men characters) returning from the previous game. While most of the characters are drawn from the Marvel Cinematic Universe, some comic book characters that had yet to appear as of the release of the game like Kamala Khan / Ms. Marvel, Sam Wilson as Captain America, Jane Foster as Thor, and the Young Avengers members Wiccan, Speed, Hulkling, and America Chavez are included as well. Director Arthur Parsons stated: "It's a celebration of everything about the Avengers. Comic books, movies, cartoons. It's everything you love about the Avengers in video games".

== Development ==
=== Audio ===
Unlike Lego Marvel Super Heroes, which used original voice acting, Lego Marvel's Avengers utilizes audio from the six films being adapted for the game, including voice and music, similar to Lego The Lord of the Rings, The Lego Movie Videogame, Lego The Hobbit, and Lego Jurassic World. The game utilizes archival audios from the actors in the films. Clark Gregg, Cobie Smulders, Ashley Johnson, Hayley Atwell, Michael Peña, and Ming-Na Wen reprise their respective roles from the films and TV shows, and Marvel Comics co-creator Stan Lee returned to voice himself. Robbie Daymond voices A-Bomb. Lou Ferrigno voices Himself and Greg Miller voiced Aldrich Killian.

=== Downloadable content ===
Free PlayStation timed exclusive downloadable content was announced. This included a character pack and a level based on the heist for the Yellowjacket suit from Ant-Man, which was released on April 6, 2016, and a Captain America: Civil War character pack that was released at launch. A season pass was also available during launch, which gave players exclusive access to the "Explorers Pack", story levels and over 40 additional playable characters. These story levels were based on the Agents of S.H.I.E.L.D. television series as well as levels focused on the comic versions of Black Panther, the Masters of Evil, Captain Marvel, and Doctor Strange. A Spider-Man character pack was released on May 24, 2016.

== Reception ==
Reception

Aggregate score
Aggregator	Score
Metacritic	3DS: 60/100; PC: 64/100; PS4: 71/100; WIIU: 69/100; XONE: 71/100

Review scores
Publication	Score
Destructoid	6/10
Game Informer	7.75/10
GameSpot	7/10
IGN	6.7/10
PC Gamer (UK)	52/100

Lego Marvel's Avengers received "mixed or average" reviews on all platforms, according to review aggregator website Metacritic. Game Informer's Andrew Reiner gave the game 7.75 out of 10. IGN awarded it a score of 6.7 out of 10, saying "LEGO Marvel's Avengers is great fun, but unfortunately restricted by sticking to the Marvel Cinematic Universe". Destructoid awarded it a score of 6 out of 10, saying "it's a fun mindless romp through a couple of interesting setpieces, but not a whole lot more than that when it comes down to it". PlayStation LifeStyle awarded it 7.5 out of 10, saying "some technical hiccups and the occasional unclear objective can hamper your progress, but these can all be overcome in a game that exudes a fun-loving attitude throughout". GameSpot awarded it a score of 7.0 out of 10, saying "if you've played a Lego game in recent years then you'll know what to expect: another familiar and fun adventure that you can enjoy with your kids". Hardcore Gamer awarded it a score of 3 out of 5, saying "while a decent action-adventure title, Avengers does little to innovate or set itself apart from a vast library of superior Lego games". PC Gamer awarded it a score of 52%, calling it "a half-hearted recreation of some fun movies, with almost nothing to offer over its predecessor".
