= Ravonna =

Fictional character in American comic books

Ravonna Renslayer
- Ravonna and Kang as depicted in Kang the Conqueror #4 (November 2021). Art by Carlos Urbano.

Publication information
- Publisher: Marvel Comics
- First appearance: Avengers #23 (December 1965)
- Created by: Stan Lee; Don Heck

In-story information
- Full name: Princess Ravonna Lexus Renslayer
- Species: Human
- Team affiliations: The Council of Kangs; Anachronauts
- Partnerships: Kang the Conqueror; Kid Immortus
- Notable aliases: Rebecca Tourminet; Kang-Nebula; Terminatrix; Temptress; Nebula; Hecate

Princess Ravonna Lexus Renslayer is a character appearing in American comic books published by Marvel Comics. Created by writer Stan Lee and artist Don Heck, the character first appeared in Avengers #23 (December 1965). Ravonna Renslayer is a princess and an assassin. She is the daughter of King Carelius and comes from a kingdom in the 40th century. She was meant to become an ambassador to her people in the quaint kingdom of Eximietatius. However, Renslayer was pulled out of her own timeline. She became the lover and successor of Kang the Conqueror. The character has been depicted as both a supervillain and an antihero.

The character has been featured in various Marvel-licensed products, including video games, animated television series, and merchandise. Ravonna Renslayer appears in the Marvel Cinematic Universe (MCU) / Disney+ series Loki (2021), portrayed by Gugu Mbatha-Raw.

== Publication history ==
Ravonna Renslayer debuted in Avengers #23 (December 1965), created by Stan Lee and Don Heck. She appeared in the 1961 Fantastic Four series, the 1967 Avengers Annual series, the 1989 Avengers Spotlight series, the 1993 Avengers: The Terminatrix Objective series, and the 2021 Kang The Conqueror series.

== Fictional character biography ==
Ravonna Lexus Renslayer was the daughter of King Carelius, a puppet ruler of an unidentified kingdom that Kang conquered in the 40th century. Ravonna first met Kang when he attempted to annex her time era into his empire. Kang loved Ravonna, but she hated him due to his attempt to conquer the kingdom. While the kingdom threatened rebellion, Kang let it be in the hope of winning the princess Ravonna's hand in marriage. Eventually, however, outright rebellion broke out, and as Kang was on the verge of winning the battle, he brought the Avengers there to witness his triumph. He hoped to defeat them and then marry Ravonna. Finally his army attacked the kingdom at his signal. One of his generals, Baltag, rebelled against him after he did not execute Ravonna, as he had done to the rulers of other conquered kingdoms. Kang then enlisted the aid of the Avengers to overthrow Baltag. He also enlisted the aid of citizens of the city, and, after stealing weaponry, the rebellion went ahead. Kang gained access to a chamber which could only be opened by the sound of his heartbeat, and activated a device that destroyed all the weaponry of his rebelling army. He released Ravonna from her dungeon, revealing he really loved her. However, Baltag attempted to shoot Kang as he sent the Avengers back to their own time, and Ravonna, realizing she loved Kang, threw herself in front of the blast, and fell into a deathlike coma, after which the general was executed.

Kang preserved her in stasis for a time, but when he played a game with the Grandmaster in a tournament of champions, to gain the power to free Ravonna and kill the Avengers, he only partially won, and chose in anger to try to kill the Avengers instead. He failed due to the presence of the Black Knight, losing his chance to save Ravonna; the Grandmaster had only granted Kang the power of death over the Avengers, and the Black Knight was presently not a member of the team. A temporal counterpart of Ravonna was later revealed to be a consort of Kang, and later learned to be a confederate of Immortus in his scheme to defeat Kang and destroy the Kang divergents. Kang rescued her from the moment before death due to the devices of Immortus when he was thrown into Limbo (later it was revealed this was due to mental manipulation), then learned this had created an alternate reality in which he was slain. He begins to destroy divergents of himself, not realizing this is part of a plan by Immortus. Ravonna does not alert Kang when the paralysis beam he is using to hold the Avengers is overloading due to the strength of Hercules, enabling the Avengers to escape. She then holds a Kang divergent double at gunpoint, and tells him if he really loves her he must not kill the other Kang. He refuses this and she lets him leave. That divergent is killed as his weapon was booby-trapped by the other Kang. Ravonna tells the other Kang that Immortus was all that was ever good in Kang as Immortus reveals himself. In a flashback, it was revealed that the real Ravonna was rescued by the Grandmaster, who revived her despite Kang's choice out of curiosity and told her of the choice Kang had made. She was embittered at Kang for not saving her when he had the chance, and she swore revenge on Kang.

She became a subversive and assassin. She appeared to Doctor Druid in visions in a scheme to enlist his aid in acquiring the deadliest weapon in the omniverse. Assuming the guise of Avengers foe Nebula, she attempted to infiltrate the Council of Cross-Time Kangs. She completed her mental subjugation of Doctor Druid, and directed him to take over leadership of the Avengers. She used Druid to help her ensorcel the Avengers to accompany her to the center of a timestorm to retrieve the great weapon. She was ultimately thwarted by the Avengers and three Cross-Time Kangs, and fell into the timestorm with Druid. As Nebula, she attempted to enlist the Fantastic Four to free her. She appeared in a vision to the Human Torch, and mind-controlled the Invisible Woman. She attempted to steal the Ultimate Nullifier, but was thwarted by the Fantastic Four. She eventually escaped the timestorm to Lincoln, Nebraska in 1961, before being defeated by a rejuvenated Doctor Druid.

Still later, she vainly attempted to enthrall Doctor Druid again. She convinced Druid to help her investigate Kang's 20th-century stronghold. Taking the name Temptress, she met the Fantastic Four, and used their time-sled to enter Chronopolis. She then fought openly with the prime Kang after taking on a guise as Terminatrix in a personal duel, a battle which ended with Kang apparently sacrificing himself to save her in the same manner she once had him. She became ruler of Chronopolis with his defeat.

After ruling Kang's kingdom for a time, and becoming bored, she revived Kang — and stabbed him through the heart. She later revived him again, properly, and the two became lovers until Kang became bored and left to reassume his earlier identity of Pharaoh Rama-Tut and battle his younger self.

She was reported deceased in the destruction of Chronopolis, Kang's extra-temporal kingdom, in Avengers Forever.

A younger Ravonna is later seen in the company of a younger Kang, Nate Richards / Kid Immortus, providing information to Doctor Doom regarding the Future Foundation. In the solo series Kang the Conqueror, Kang rewrites history by manipulating his younger self, resurrecting Ravonna by giving her the ability of retroactive reincarnation: having the same name and soul across different races, species and genders intersecting with Kang's personal timeline across the past, present, and future, with the series focusing on a particular Ravonna as Moon Knight.

== Powers and abilities ==
Ravonna Renslayer does not possess superhuman abilities but has a gifted intellect. She is a formidable hand-to-hand combatant, and has mastery of various types of exotic weaponry. She also has mastery of a vast array of futuristic technology. Renslayer has received advanced schooling in the arts and sciences of the 41st century. She wears body armor of an unknown composition, and uses various futuristic technology including vibro-knives, concussion blasters, and shape-shifting technology enabling her to alter her appearance at will.

Furthermore, an incarnation of Renslayer becomes Moon Knight after being granted the ability of retroactive reincarnation.

== In other media ==
=== Television ===
- Ravonna Renslayer appears in The Avengers: Earth's Mightiest Heroes, voiced by Cindy Robinson. This version was affected by a temporal destabilization that caused her to gradually fade out of existence, with Kang desperately seeking a cure to save her. While this plotline is never resolved in the series, the tie-in comic reveals that she eventually recovered and returned to Kang's side.

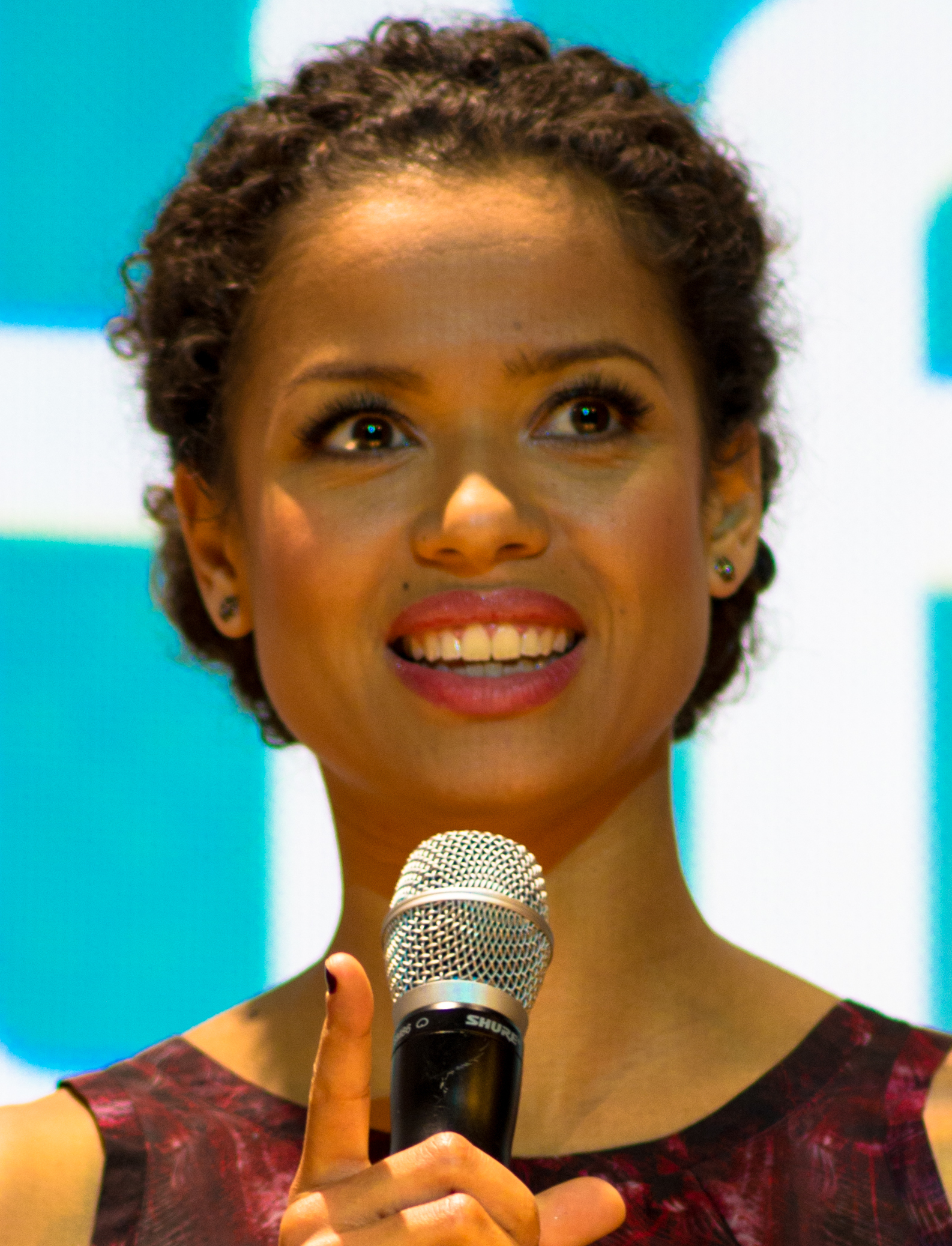
Gugu Mbatha-Raw portrays Ravonna in Loki.

- Judge Ravonna Renslayer appears in Loki, portrayed by Gugu Mbatha-Raw. This version is a time-variant of Ohio school vice principal Rebecca Tourminet who was pulled from her native timeline by He Who Remains, had her memories erased, and was made a Hunter and later Judge for the Time Variance Authority (TVA). She left the TVA to go on a mission with Miss Minutes to find "free will" after receiving information from He Who Remains.They travel to Chicago, 1868 to secretly drop the TVA Handbook to a young Victor Timely, a variant of He Who Remains, who informed Miss Minutes about this plan before his death. Traveling to 1893 at the Chicago World's Fair, they encounter an adult Timely, presenting his prototype loom. Renslayer and Miss Minutes reach him first and escape from Loki, Mobius M. Mobius and Sylvie, but Miss Minutes betrays Renslayer out of jealousy. Renslayer faces Timely in his laboratory in Wisconsin, as do Loki, Mobius and Sylvie. After Timely leaves with Loki and Mobius, Renslayer and Miss Minutes are thrown by Sylvie to the Citadel at the end of Time, where they see He Who Remains' decaying corpse, and discover a secret, that she was once He Who Remains's companion and commander of his army before he ordered her memories to be erased along with everyone else's. Upon returning to the TVA, they kidnap Timely, cut down D-90, and kill Dox and her men who do not join them except Hunter X-5/Brad Wolfe. Ouroboros "O.B." deactivates Miss Minutes and Renslayer is pruned by Wolfe, who was charmed by Sylvie. In the end, Renslayer awakens in the Void and encounters Alioth.

=== Film ===
The MCU incarnation of Ravonna Renslayer appears in The Simpsons short film The Good, the Bart, and the Loki, voiced by Dawnn Lewis.

=== Video games ===
- Ravonna Renslayer / Terminatrix appears in Lego Marvel Super Heroes 2, voiced by Kate O'Sullivan. This version is a double agent for the Avengers who works with them to defeat Kang. Following his defeat, Ravonna uses a time crystal to transform him into an infant.
- Ravonna Renslayer appears as a playable card in Marvel Snap.

=== Miscellaneous ===
- An alternate universe variant of Ravonna Renslayer appears in the X-Men/Spider-Man trilogy Time's Arrow, by Tom DeFalco. She becomes involved in a plot by a variant of Kang, wherein he discovers she is the last living version of Ravonna. He attempts to preserve her universe while destroying several others, even trying to frame the X-Men for the universal destruction while claiming that he has only been able to save Ravonna's universe by chance rather than it being part of his wider plan. In the ensuing fight, Kang inadvertently kills her. The X-Men escape while Kang is left devastated and allows himself to be incarcerated by Ravonna's soldiers. A final scene reveals that Kang's right-hand man was actually Immortus, using this scheme to remove the threat of another Kang variant.
- In 2021 and 2023, Funko released two Ravonna Renslayer Funko Pop figures inspired by the Marvel Cinematic Universe (MCU) incarnation of the character.
