= Victor Timely =

Fictional character appearing in Marvel Comics

Publication information
- Publisher: Marvel Comics
- First appearance: The Avengers Annual #21 (July 1992)
- Created by: Peter Sanderson; Rich Yanizeski

In-story information
- Team affiliations: Timely, Wisconsin; Council of Kangs
- Notable aliases: Victor Timely, Jr.; Victor Timely III; Kang Prime
- Abilities: Superhuman intelligence; Time manipulation; Immortality; Doppelgänger robot-building

Mayor Victor Timely is a character appearing in American comic books published by Marvel Comics. He is a divergent version of the time traveller Kang the Conqueror who establishes a small, quiet town called Timely, Wisconsin in 1901 to serve as a 20th-century base for his future self. As time passes, he fakes his death and poses as his own son Victor Timely Jr. (and later his grandson Victor Timely III), educates Phineas Horton to eventually create the original Human Torch, and eventually becomes the new Kang Prime by the time of Kang Dynasty.

The character made his feature film debut in the Marvel Cinematic Universe (MCU) film Ant-Man and the Wasp: Quantumania (2023), portrayed by Jonathan Majors, and subsequently returned in the second season of the television series Loki, portrayed again by Majors and by Nasri Thompson as a child.

== Publication history ==
Victor Timely first appeared in The Avengers Annual #21 and was created by Peter Sanderson and Rich Yanizeski. Due to the events of The Celestial Madonna Saga, every action taken by Kang the Conqueror, Pharaoh Rama-Tut, and Immortus due to the actions of "Prime Kang" leads to each of their travels into the past creating divergent versions of themselves, all of whom seek to rule their own divergent empires and continue their own schemes, with Victor Timely diverging from the events of Avengers Forever.

== Fictional character biography ==
At some point in his personal timeline, a divergent version of Kang decides to abandon the 21st century and sets his sights on conquering the 20th. Traveling back in time to January 1, 1901, he founds the town of Timely, Wisconsin, grows a moustache and takes on the identity of town mayor "Victor Timely". Building a corporate empire, Timely Industries, he builds a series of factories for common machinery ahead of Henry Ford and Thomas Edison, while instilling in his company's workers unflinching loyalty and knowledge of robotics. Subsequently, Timely uses his town to establish the time-crossroads of Chronopolis, which he intends to serve as city-state headquarters for all future versions of himself. Originally confined to the town itself, the fortress gradually grows out of sync with time and space into the outskirts of Limbo, becoming a crossroads between past, present, and future, where one can walk between all time periods without requiring the use of a time machine, accessible via a portal. When away in Chronopolis, Timely is replaced by robotic stand-ins remotely run by A.I. copies of himself, which would age and die over time, allowing him to fake his death and assume the mantle of his own "son", Victor Timely, Junior.

In 1929, Timely employs Phineas Horton to develop the technology to allow him to eventually create the original Human Torch by 1939, allowing Timely a secret backdoor to take control of the android. By the 1980s (modern-day; floating timeline), now presenting as his grandson Victor Timely III, Timely Industries' technology stretches out to include the security measures behind the Baxter Building and Avengers Tower, and the robotic limbs of every cyborg in the Marvel Universe, in particular Misty Knight and Deathlok, allowing him to control their actions and eventually supplant Kang Prime with his former name, becoming the Anachronauts, his soldiers in Chronopolis. This grants Timely (now Kang Prime) control over the Sentinels in "Kang Dynasty".

== Powers and abilities ==
Victor Timely has eternal youth and possesses a genius-level intellect. He amassed an extensive knowledge of 20th-century history, allowing him to dominate the mechanical industry of the time and provide his future selves with an advantage over their adversaries. He also is capable of making robot duplicates of himself that simulate human aging to help hide his immortality from the world at large.

== Reception ==
In 2023, Comic Book Resources included Victor Timely as their fourteenth-best characterised incarnation of Kang the Conqueror.

== In other media ==
- Victor Timely appears in the Marvel Cinematic Universe (MCU), portrayed by Jonathan Majors as an adult and Nasri Thompson as a child. This version was born and is primarily active in the 19th century and is described by Loki producer Kevin R. Wright as "sort of an eccentric, quiet inventor that maybe is, like, a bit out of time and out of place". Timely first appears in the post-credits scene of the film Ant-Man and the Wasp: Quantumania (2023) before appearing in the second season of the Disney+ series Loki.
- Victor Timely appears as an alternate skin for Kang the Conqueror in Lego Marvel Super Heroes 2, voiced by Peter Serafinowicz.
