= Kang the Conqueror (comic book) =

2021 comic book miniseries

- Cover of Kang the Conqueror #1 (Aug. 2021)

Publication information
- Publisher: Marvel Comics
- Schedule: Monthly
- Format: Limited series
- Publication date: August – December 2021
- No. of issues: 5
- Main character: Kang the Conqueror

Creative team
- Written by: Jackson Lanzing; Collin Kelly
- Penciller: Carlos Magno

Kang the Conqueror is a comic book miniseries that was published by Marvel Comics from August to December 2021.

== Synopsis ==
The series follows Kang's origin.

== Plot ==
Somewhere in the timestream, Kang began observing the timeline of the Kree-Skrull War, in which he reflected on becoming a conqueror. In his youth in the 31st Century, Nathaniel Richards grew up in a Utopia during the Post-Scarcity, where he lived his life out of boredom and isolated from society, watching history. He wandered into Doctor Doom's abandoned mansion, where he took inspiration from Doom. An awakened Doombot attacked Nathaniel until his future self, Kang, saved him. During his encounter, Nathiel claims to Kang that he was the liberator to safeguard historical knowledge as Doom's heir. Kang reveals to young Nathaniel that he is his future self and takes him to the past. Upon time-traveling into the late Cretaceous period, Kang began training his younger self to become a conqueror while revealing his past failures, where he was easily thwarted by the Avengers and Fantastic Four. At that point, a drunken Kang reveals that he had lost Ravonna and advised never to love anyone but to conquer. Nathaniel rescued a tribal girl named Adi, who led him to her tribe. The tribal leader then gave a marking on his face for saving Adi and celebrated the night with the tribes, where he felt love for the first time. Kang and Nathaniel fell into an argument in which Nathaniel expressed his understanding of love towards Adi and her tribe. Enraged, Kang forces Nathaniel to watch in horror and resentment as he massacres the entire tribe, including Adi. Unable to cope with Kang's abuse, Nathaniel plans to abandon his future self as he takes Kang's equipment just as the meteorite is approaching. Nathaniel quickly time-jumps to ancient Egypt during Pharaoh Rama-Tut's reign.

Nathaniel began fighting off Rama-Tut's army, where he was rescued by the Moon Knight, who revealed herself as Ravonna. As they travel to Khonshu's temple, Nathaniel begins to open his mind to Khonshu, his vengeance and resentment towards Kang, thus granting him an Iron Lad armor. As Nathaniel and Ravonna overpower the army, they begin to establish their romantic bond until Rama-Tut captures them. During the confrontation, Rama-Tut subdues Ravonna with his Ultra-Diode ray (a device used to strip away free will and compel submission) while Nathaniel tries to reason with the pharaoh, revealing himself as Kang's past self. Instead, Rama-Tut enslaves Nathaniel to reshape the Iron Lad's armor, becoming his Scarlet Centurion to wage war against En Sabah Nur. Having survived the battle and sought revenge, Nathaniel remembers that Rama-Tut was already defeated by the Fantastic Four (which leads chronologically to Kang's first comic book appearance in Fantastic Four #19). Having lost hope of finding Ravonna in the rumble, Nathaniel turns to Apocalypse and persuades him to get revenge on Kang.

Accepting the offer, Apocalypse places Nathaniel in a sarcophagus through suspended animation, allowing Natinel to spend five thousand years. Upon entering the modern era, Nathaniel began building equipment, preparing for Kang's arrival to confront the Avengers (which is tied directly to Kang's first debut in Avengers #8). With Kang defeated by the Avengers and having escaped through the timestream, Nathaniel quickly sneaks into the ship to confront him. Their confrontation was interrupted when Doctor Doom invaded the ship. As they both successfully banished Doom from the ship, Nathaniel killed Kang, believing he had succeeded. Nathaniel then used Kang's ship to travel back to Ancient Egypt, impersonating Rama-Tut, and spent his life as a tyrannical Pharaoh to spare Ravonna from her fate, only to send her into self-imposed exile. As Rama-Tut, Nathaniel began to experience his own demise when he waged war against Apocalypse, enslaving his past self and encountering the Fantastic Four. Using the sarcophagus, Nathaniel was forced to retreat as he launched himself through the timestream, leading to an apocalyptic future where he encountered another version of Ravonna.

Nathaniel and Ravonna establish a friendship as they work together to survive in the apocalyptic war. As Nathaniel tries to show love, Ravonna rejects him, explaining, upon seeing his bloodlust, and leaves him. Distraught at being unloved and unable to escape his fate, Nathaniel decides to make himself a warlord as he starts building new equipment, conquering new rivals, leading his armies in never-ending battles, and embracing himself as Kang. After spending years of ongoing battles, Kang builds his own Time-Ship, allowing him to travel through time and space, waging war against every foe he encounters, such as King Arthur, the Kosmosians' Monarchs, his future self Immortus, the Shi'ar and the Skrulls. After spending a hundred years of conquest, Kang enters the 40th century where, for the first time, he meets Princess Ravonna Lexus Renslayer. Refusing to fight against her, Kang chose to establish peace. Upon reflecting on his future self's warning, Kang built himself an Omni-Viewer, allowing him to observe multiple possibilities that he insists on winning Ravonna's love against the generals who opposed him. As a result, his general Baltag betrays him, and Kang summons the Avengers in a desperate attempt to thwart him. This results in Kang losing Ravonna (chronologically ties to Avengers #23) . For the first time, Nathaniel realizes his future self's mistake as he tries to keep Ravonna alive and vows to revive her if it means shattering reality and time itself.

Kang settled at Chronopolis, located at the far end of time, where he sought to separate Ravonna from the timestream. As Kang separates Ravonna, her body splinters and is retroactively reincarnated into multiple variants' existence in separate timelines. After multiple attempts to spare Ravonna, Kang fails repeatedly until Terminatrix rebels against him. Having been well aware of Kang's involvement, Terminatrix managed to gain access and confront Kang. She then caused an explosion on Chronopolis, causing Kang to fall through the time loop. After escaping the time loop, Kang travels to the 31st century to meet his younger self once again and repeats the same mistake as his older self did, succumbing to a trap that he cannot escape. As young Nathaniel left him to die by the asteroid, Kang had already made preparations to let his younger self become like him, creating a paradox of himself, and vowed to become a better conqueror and never love anyone.

== Prints ==
=== Issues ===
#	Publication date	Comic Book Roundup rating	Estimated sales (first month)
1	August 18, 2021	8.4 by 16 professional critics.	82,234, ranked 8th in North America
2	September 15, 2021	7.5 by 4 professional critics.	34,169, ranked 76th in North America
3	October 13, 2021	6.2 by 2 professional critics.	31,500, ranked 78th in North America
4	November 17, 2021	6.3 by 3 professional critics.	—N/a
5	December 22, 2021	7.4 by 4 professional critics.	—N/a

=== Collected editions ===
Title	Format	Publication date	Collected material	Pages	ISBN
Kang the Conqueror: Only Myself Left to Conquer	Trade Paperback	February 9, 2022	Kang the Conqueror #1-5	120	9781302930356, 1302930354

== Reception ==
Hannibal Tabu from Bleeding Cool gave the first issue 7.5 score and praised the artists. Sayantan Gayen from Comic Book Resources, reviewing the final, wrote "Kang the Conqueror #5 ends on a somber note".
