= Kang the Conqueror =

Marvel Comics supervillain

- Kang the Conqueror, as he appeared on a splash page of Timeless #1 (December 2022). Art by Greg Land.

Publication information
- Publisher: Marvel Comics
- First appearance: First appearance: Fantastic Four #19 (October 1963); As Kang: The Avengers #8 (September 1964)
- Created by: Stan Lee; Jack Kirby

In-story information
- Alter ego: Nathaniel Richards
- Species: Human
- Place of origin: Other Earth, 31st Century
- Team affiliations: Council of Kangs; Cross-Time Kangs
- Partnerships: Ravonna Renslayer (wife)
- Abilities: Genius-level intellect; Skilled hand-to-hand combatant; Access to advanced technology; Highly advanced battle armor that grants: Superhuman strength, speed, stamina, and durability; Time travel; Telekinesis; Energy, hologram and force-field projection; Ability to control other forms of technology

Kang the Conqueror (Nathaniel Richards) is a supervillain appearing in American comic books published by Marvel Comics. Created by Stan Lee and Jack Kirby, the character first appeared in Fantastic Four #19 (October 1963) as Rama-Tut, before being reinvented as Kang in The Avengers #8 (September 1964). The character is noted for his use of advanced scientific technology including time travel, which allow alternate versions of Kang to appear throughout Marvel Comics titles, such as Rama-Tut, Immortus, Scarlet Centurion, Victor Timely, Iron Lad, and Mister Gryphon.

Kang the Conqueror has been described as one of Marvel's most notable and powerful villains. Kang has made media appearances in animated television and video games. Kang made his live-action debut in the Marvel Cinematic Universe film Ant-Man and the Wasp: Quantumania (2023), portrayed by Jonathan Majors, who previously appeared as different versions of the character in the Disney+ series Loki (2021–2023).

== Publication history ==
The character who would become best known as Kang first appeared in Fantastic Four #19 (October 1963), by Stan Lee and Jack Kirby. This issue introduced the pharaoh Rama-Tut, a criminal from the year 3000 who had travelled back in time and conquered ancient Egypt. It was implied that he was a descendant or future incarnation of Fantastic Four villain Doctor Doom. After a second appearance the following year in Fantastic Four Annual #2 (September 1964), the character appeared again the same month, this time under the identity of Kang, in The Avengers #8, also by Lee and Kirby. This issue also established that Rama-Tut was a younger version of Kang. A decade later, the character of Immortus, previously introduced in Avengers #10 (November 1964), was retroactively established to be a future identity of Kang's in Giant-Size Avengers #3 (February 1975).

Fantastic Four #273 (December 1984) heavily implied that Kang was not descended from Doom, but from Reed Richards' father Nathaniel, via one of Reed's half-siblings. Building on this, Kang's birth name was revealed to also be "Nathaniel Richards" in What If...? Vol. 2 #39 (July 1992), a fact later incorporated into the primary continuity of the Marvel Universe. However, subsequent publications, such as Avengers Forever #9 (August 1999) and Doctor Doom #6 (March 2020), have continued to present Kang's ancestry as ambiguous, suggesting he may have descended from one, both, or neither of the two men, in particular Kristoff Vernard: Doom's adoptive son and a half-sibling of Reed.

Kang featured in an eponymous miniseries in 2021.

== Fictional character biography ==
=== Pre-Kang ===
Nathaniel Richards, a 31st-century scholar and descendant of Reed Richards's time traveling father Nathaniel, becomes fascinated with history and discovers the time travel technology created by Victor von Doom, another possible ancestor of his. He then travels back in time to ancient Egypt aboard a Sphinx-shaped timeship and reinvents himself as Rama-Tut, with plans to claim En Sabah Nur—the mutant destined to become Apocalypse—as his heir. The pharaoh's rule is cut short when he is defeated by the time-displaced Fantastic Four. An embittered Nathaniel Richards travels forward to the 20th century and meets Doctor Doom, whom he believes might be his ancestor. He later designs an armor based on Doom's and, calling himself the Scarlet Centurion, pits the Avengers team against alternate-reality counterparts. He plans to dispose of all of them, but the Avengers manage to force him from the timeline, where a divergent version of him becomes Victorex Prime, archenemy of the Squadron Supreme.

Nathaniel then tries to return to the 31st century, but overshoots by a thousand years, discovering that humanity has ruined the Earth through endless conflict using advanced weapons they no longer understand. He finds it simple to conquer the planet, expanding his dominion throughout the galaxy, and reinvents himself as Kang the Conqueror. But this future world is dying, and so he decides to take over an earlier, more fertile Earth.

=== Early appearances and Ravonna ===
On Nathaniel's first foray into the 20th century under the Kang identity, he meets and battles the Avengers, capturing everyone but the Wasp and Rick Jones, and informs the world that they have 24 hours to surrender to him. Jones and some friends pretend they want to help Kang, but double-cross him once they gain access to his ship, and the Avengers are freed. In an attempt to stop them, Kang releases radiation that only beings from his time are immune to, but Thor uses his hammer to absorb the rays and send them back at the warlord so even he cannot withstand it, and he is forced to escape. He later attempts to defeat the Avengers using a Spider-Man robot, but the real Spider-Man destroys it.

In his own time, Kang falls for the princess of one of his subject kingdoms, Ravonna, who does not return his feelings. In an attempt to demonstrate his power, he kidnaps the Avengers and, after several escape attempts on their part, subdues them and the rebellious kingdom with the help of his army. When Kang refuses to execute Ravonna, his commanders revolt and he frees the Avengers to fight with him against them. They successfully subdue them, but not before Ravonna is mortally wounded when she leaps in front of a blast meant for Kang, realizing she does love him after all. Kang returns the Avengers to their present, and places Ravonna's body in stasis.

Kang appears in modern-day as he attempts to retrieve a rogue Growing Man construct who is growing larger with every blow. Both Thor and the police are not able to subdue the giant, until Kang appears from a time machine disguised as a boulder. He fires a ray, shrinking and subduing the Growing Man to doll-sized so he can be "re-hidden". He later reactivates the Growing Man to kidnap an incapacitated Tony Stark and draw the Avengers into his game, though the purpose is not revealed. Thor fails to keep Kang from escaping into the time-stream.

In hopes of restoring his love to life, Kang enters a wager with the cosmic entity Grandmaster, using the Avengers as pawns in a game which, if won, can temporarily grant him power over life and death. The first round ends in stalemate when an unaware Black Knight intervenes and prevents a clear victory by the Avengers, although the team definitively wins the second round. Due to the first round's stalemate, Kang does not earn the power of both life and death but is forced to choose. He selects the power of death over the Avengers, but is stopped by the Black Knight, who, not being an Avenger at the time, is unaffected.

Next Kang kidnaps the Hulk and sends him to 1917 France to kill the Phantom Eagle before he can save Bruce Banner's grandfather from a cannon. This would prevent the Hulk from existing and consequently, the formation of the Avengers. However, the Hulk destroys the cannon which sends him back to the present while Kang is projected into Limbo.

=== The Celestial Madonna ===
Some time later Kang reappears at Avengers Mansion seeking the "Celestial Madonna", who turns out to be Mantis, desiring to marry her as she is apparently destined to have a powerful child. The heroes are aided by a future version of Kang, who, tired of conquest, had returned to ancient Egypt and his identity of Rama-Tut, ruling benevolently for ten years before placing himself in suspended animation to revive in the 20th century, desiring to counsel and change his younger self. While Kang is successfully foiled, Rama-Tut is unable to prevent the accidental death of Swordsman. During an adventure in Limbo, it is revealed that Immortus is the future incarnation of both Kang and Rama-Tut.

While attempting to travel to the time of the Crusades, Hawkeye accidentally comes across Kang, sending both to the Old West. The warlord begins to develop a stronghold to conquer the 19th century, thus also conquering the present. Aided this time by Immortus, the Avengers, with some assistance from the Two-Gun Kid, confront Kang. While trying to muster the strength to defeat Thor, Kang overloads his armor and destroys himself, apparently erasing Immortus and Rama-Tut from existence.

=== Prime Kang and creation of alternate selves ===
Years later, the Beyonder plucks Kang from the timestream to participate on the villains' side in the first of the Secret Wars. Soon after, it is revealed that while Kang had died, his time-traveling had created a number of alternate Kangs. The Kang to discover this had been drawn to Limbo after his time-travel vehicle was destroyed by Thor. Finding Immortus' remains inside his fortress, Kang assumes the "Lord of Time" to be deceased and discovers the alternate versions of himself using viewing devices he finds, although he does not realize that Immortus is also a version of himself. At one point, he brings Ravonna to Limbo from the moment before her death, unintentionally creating an alternate reality where he was slain. Determined to be the only Kang, he joins with two particularly cunning divergents whom he determines he cannot easily eliminate, the three forming a council that systematically destroys the other alternate versions. He destroys one of the other two Kangs, then brings in the Avengers as part of a plot to destroy the other one, although the latter Kang eventually discovers the plot. This Kang is delayed by Ravonna, who tells him that if he truly loves her he must not kill the first Kang, but he ignores her, goes after him anyway, and is destroyed. Immortus then reveals he faked his death and manipulated everything from behind the scenes. Now only the one "Prime" Kang remains, who Immortus tricks into absorbing the memories of all the slain Kangs, which drives him insane. Immortus then sends the Avengers back to their own timeline.

This Kang diverges into two alternate Kangs, and one is invited to join the Crosstime Kang Corps (or the "Council of Cross-Time Kangs"), which consists of a wide range of Kangs from multiple timelines who are searching for a Celestial "Ultimate Weapon". This Kang calls himself "Fred" (by his own admission a humorous nod to Fred Flintstone, with a prehistoric name being appropriate for a time-traveler) and has a brief encounter with the Avengers while trying to stop "Nebula" (later retconned to be Ravonna in disguise) from interfering with a timeline. The Prime Kang, having recovered, then attempts to manipulate the Avengers from a time vortex, and encounters the Fantastic Four in a bid to capture Mantis and use her to defeat a Celestial and the other Kangs, and "Fred" is incinerated by a Nebula-possessed Human Torch during a later battle with the Fantastic Four.

=== New Empire, Avengers Forever, and Young Avengers ===
Later, the Prime Kang appears, captures the Vision, and battles both the Avengers and a new foe, Terminatrix, who is revealed to be a revived Ravonna. Kang is critically injured when he intercepts a blow from Thor's hammer Mjölnir that was meant for his old love, who is distraught over his sacrifice and teleports away with him. Terminatrix places Prime Kang in stasis to heal his injuries and assumes control of his empire. However, she finds the empire under attack by a chronal being called Alioth and is forced to summon the Avengers to assist. She revives Kang, who assists the Avengers in defeating Alioth, but not before allowing the entity to kill the entire Crosstime Kang Corps.

In Avengers Forever, flashbacks reveal that many of Kang's recent actions were motivated by more of a desire to do something rather than a genuine desire for power, and that Rama-Tut is his past and future self; feeling listless and trapped by the burdens of the empire he has created, Kang at one point returned to life as Rama-Tut for a more simple life where he did not have a vast empire to administer. However, as Kang prepares to become Rama-Tut once again and from there Immortus, he glimpses the future and learns of Immortus's servitude to the Time-Keepers of the Time Variance Authority, renewing his horror at the destiny that awaits him as that 'simpering academic'. As a result, Kang rejects this future to the point of aiding the Avengers in protecting Rick Jones from Immortus's latest scheme. When Immortus betrays the Time-Keepers to try and save the Avengers, they kill him and attempt to turn Kang into Immortus before Rama-Tut became Immortus. However, the temporal backlash of Kang's strength of will in a temporally unstable environment causes Immortus and Rama-Tut to split off from Kang, essentially making them both clear alternate versions of Kang rather than Immortus being Kang's definitive future. With the weakened Time-Keepers destroyed, Kang rejoices in his freedom from the destiny of Immortus and Rama-Tut, as he has now technically become them while still being himself.

After some months, Kang embarks on an ambitious scheme to conquer the Earth, this time aided by his son Marcus, who uses the "Scarlet Centurion" alias. Kang promises any who aid him on Earth a place in his new order, which puts Earth's defenses and the Avengers under strain as they fight off villain after villain. He then takes control of Earth's defense systems, and forces a surrender after destroying Washington, D.C., killing millions. The Avengers continue to battle the forces of Kang's new empire, and Captain America eventually defeats him in personal combat. Although imprisoned, Kang is freed by his son, revealed to be only one of a series of clones, and kills clone Marcus for betraying him by assisting Warbird during the invasion and keeping it secret despite multiple opportunities to admit the truth; while Kang could tolerate the treachery if it allowed Marcus to become his own man, he cannot tolerate a traitor who remains active in his ranks. Depressed at his new loss, Kang retreats from Earth.

At some point, Kang travels back to his own past to prevent an incident where a confrontation with a bully left him in a coma for a year. Meeting his future self so horrifies Kang's past self that he steals Kang's armor and retreats to the past, using an emergency protocol created by the Vision to recruit a new team that comes to be known as the Young Avengers. The young Kang adopts the alias of Iron Lad. When Kang tracks his younger self to the past, the Young Avengers are able to kill him, but the subsequent changes to history force Iron Lad to return to his time and erase his memory of these events, although the Young Avengers remain as a team with Iron Lad's armor now self-operating with a consciousness based on an amalgamation of Iron Lad and the Vision.

Kang travels the multiverse and recruits a number of individuals to save it. He appears to the remaining members of the Avengers Unity Squad after Earth has been destroyed by a Celestial. Temporal barriers prevent Kang from traveling back himself, but he is able to help the surviving Unity Squad members project their minds into their past selves so that they can defeat the Celestial that attacked Earth. Kang subsequently attempts to steal the Celestials' power for himself, requiring Sunfire and Havok to put themselves at risk by absorbing some of his energy themselves so that they can force him to expend his stolen power.

=== Uncanny Inhumans and All-New, All-Different Marvel ===
Before the Inhuman king Black Bolt destroys the city of Attilan to release Terrigen Mist throughout the world, he sends his son Ahura away for Kang to foster. Black Bolt later releases a small amount of Terrigen Mist to activate Ahura's Terrigenesis. While Ahura is going through the change, Black Bolt asks Kang to save his son from the coming end of all things, which Kang agrees to on the condition that the son remain permanently in his care.

While taunting the Inhumans' efforts to find Ahura, another Kang emerges under the alias of Mister Gryphon, claiming that he has become splintered into various alternate versions of himself as a result of recent temporal disruptions. With this Kang confined to the present, he mounts a massive assault on the Avengers with the aid of Equinox and a reprogrammed Vision, intending to use Mjölnir's time-traveling ability to return to his era, but is defeated.

When Vision abducts Kang's infant self in an attempt to defeat him, the latter, split into increasingly divergent versions of himself by the fractured state of time, retaliates by attacking various Avengers in their infant states. A possible future version of Kang saves key Avengers from his past self's attack by bringing them into Limbo until Hercules acquires an amulet from a former Fate that protects him from Kang's assault. During a battle inside a temple in Vietnam, the Wasp goes to place baby Kang back where he belongs. Kang is subsequently defeated.

During the "Infinity Countdown" storyline, Kang the Conqueror gains knowledge of the calamity that would come if the Infinity Gems were to be gathered in the same location again. To prevent this from occurring, he abducts Adam Warlock, convinces him to help secure the Soul Gem in exchange for the Time Gem, and sends him back in time to receive counsel from Rama-Tut.

=== Fresh start and Kang the Conqueror solo series ===
In the "Pottersville" arc of the Doctor Doom solo series, Kang is shown to be tethered to Doom in a quantum entanglement, appearing at random times throughout the series conversing with the Latverian despot. This is later revealed to be a ploy by Kang, as by aiding Doom in saving the world Kang is actually making the world easier for himself to conquer in two hundred years' time. In the solo series Kang the Conqueror, Kang rewrites history by manipulating a younger version of him to go through all of his previous identities – Iron Lad, Scarlet Centurion, Pharaoh Rama-Tut, and finally Kang – into becoming the purest form of would-be conqueror, resurrecting Ravonna by giving her the ability of reincarnation.

== Powers and abilities ==
Kang has no superhuman abilities but is an extraordinary genius, an expert historical scholar, and a master physicist (specializing in time travel), engineer, and technician. He is armed with 40th-century technology, wearing highly advanced battle armor that enhances his strength, is capable of energy, hologram, and force-field projection, has a 30-day supply of air and food, and is capable of controlling other forms of technology. Courtesy of his time-ship, Kang has access to technology from any century, and he once claimed his ship alone could destroy the Moon.

As Rama-Tut, he used an "ultra-diode" ray gun that was able to sap the wills of human beings. At a high frequency, it is able to weaken superhuman beings and prevent use of their superpowers. They can be freed from its effects if the gun is fired at them a second time.

== Temporal selves ==
Kang has taken on many names throughout his life, and his frequent time traveling has resulted in a number of alternate versions of him with distinct identities and fates.

=== Rama-Tut ===
Rama-Tut was Kang's original alias when he ruled ancient Egypt. Later in life, he retires as Kang, returns to the Rama-Tut identity, and helps the Avengers defeat his past self when he attempts to capture the "Celestial Madonna". He nearly surrenders to destiny to become Immortus, but changes his mind and returns to the Kang identity when he discovers that Immortus is a pawn of beings called the Time-Keepers.

=== Immortus ===
Immortus is a future version of Kang who resides in Limbo. Kang was destined to become him until the last issue of the Avengers Forever series, in which powerful beings called the Time-Keepers unintentionally separate the former from the latter.

=== Iron Lad ===
Iron Lad is an adolescent version of Kang who learned of his future self when Kang tried to prevent a childhood hospitalization. Attempting to escape his destiny, the teen Nate Richards steals his future self's advanced armor and travels back to the past, forming the Young Avengers to help him stop Kang. When his attempt to reject his destiny results in Kang's death, the resulting destruction caused by the changes in history forces Iron Lad to return to his time and undo the damage by becoming Kang.

=== Victor Timely ===
A divergent version of Kang establishes a small, quiet town called Timely, Wisconsin in 1901 to serve as a 20th-century base, where he occasionally resides as Mayor Victor Timely. Posing as his son Victor Timely Jr., he develops an interest in visiting college graduate Phineas Horton and provides him with knowledge that leads to him creating the original Human Torch.

=== Doctor Doom ===
When a group of Avengers attacked Kang's fortress in an attempt to alter the warlord's past, they were confronted by Kang's future selves. The Avengers could spot Doctor Doom among them, who claimed that the Avengers had "cornered" them at a point where their powers were at their greatest, which implied that this Doom was a future Kang as well. He and the other Kangs were later imprisoned at the End of Time.

=== Scarlet Centurion ===
Between his first stint as Rama-Tut and going on to become Kang, Nathaniel Richards used the Scarlet Centurion as a one-time identity, fighting the Avengers in an alternate timeline. The name was later used by Kang's son Marcus during Avengers Forever.

A divergent version of the Scarlet Centurion who was also known as Victorex Prime retained the identity and never became Kang, instead taking over the 40th century of the Squadron Supreme's universe. On becoming bored with his success and dictatorship over a total of fifteen moons and planets, Victorex Prime elects to invade the past for further conquests, coming into conflict with the Squadron Supreme by sending "temporal hard light holograms" of his Scarlet Centurion form to the past to fight on his behalf. He later brings several members of the Squadron to his time in order to compete in death games against the Earth-616 Grandmaster, with the Squadron serving as the Grandmaster's champions against Victorex Prime's Institute of Evil. On losing, Victorex Prime inadvertently inspires the Grandmaster to issue similar challenges to other divergent versions of Kang.

While arranging for his fourth invasion into the past, sending a holographic envoy of his Scarlet Centurion form ahead of him as herald, Victorex Prime is left shaken when Hyperion, "not in the mood" for battle, while mourning a loss, informs him that while he has been allowed to live on his previous defeats, he will be executed if he attempts to invade the past when any members of the team are mourning as per the historical record, and that he would slowly kill Victorex Prime personally should he break these rules. Daunted, Victorex Prime flees to the future, resorting to subtle ways to mess with the Squadron by interfering with Tom Thumb's attempts to develop a cure for cancer (and all other diseases, as well as aging), before succumbing to depression, having conquered everything in the past, present, and future, after a temporal bubble emerges around the late 20th century and surrounding decades, preventing him from visiting the time.

Thirty-five years later, still unchallenged and unfulfilled, Victorex Prime's followers discover a crack in the temporal bubble, displaying a massive humanoid hand emerging from space and growing large enough to engulf the Earth, the Sun, and all of space itself. Emboldened by this new challenge, and once again able to access the past, Victorex Prime sends a new temporal hologram backwards in time to confer with Master Menace, the greatest criminal scientist of his age, simultaneously with Hyperion seeking out the scientist. Reached a reluctant truce, Master Menace conceives of a device for Hyperion to use stop the entity's spread over the next ten hours, while Victorex Prime transports Master Menace to his future, where he spends fifteen years perfecting his work before returning the completed device to Hyperion less than an hour after leaving. Victorex Prime realizes he enjoys the excitement of being a superhero instead of a supervillain, and holographically accompanies Master Menace and the Squadron Supreme as they journeyed out into space to confront the entity.

In an attempt to stop the entity, Victorex Prime retrieves the Overmind, believing his power could turn it back. When Overmind is instead killed, a terrified Victorex Prime dejectedly admits defeat, and prepares to flee to his future. At the last moment, Arcanna Jones begs Victorex Prime to save the life of her infant son, which after a moment of consideration he refuses. The crack in the temporal bubble seals shut after he returns to the 40th century. Immediately regretting his decision, Victorex Prime spends the remaining 211 years of his life in abject misery, unaware that the Squadron survived because of his decision to leave Arcanna's son behind.

=== Chronomonitor #616 ===
Chronomonitor #616 is a variation of Kang the Conqueror who works for the Time Variance Authority (TVA), inducted into the organization on his first attempt to travel back in time. A renegade Chronomonitor from the organization, he is stripped of his power after interfering with history for personal gain as part of a mid-life crisis before escaping custody and killing and replacing a version of himself as Rama-Tut. Ultimately, Chronomonitor #616 is trapped in a time loop by the TVA, swearing revenge upon them and the Fantastic Four.

=== Mister Gryphon ===
Qeng Gryphon, or simply Mister Gryphon, is a variation of Kang the Conqueror who is confined to the present. He is the CEO of Qeng Enterprises.

=== He Who Remains ===
He Who Remains is an older version of Kang the Conqueror and is the final director of the Time Variance Authority at the Citadel at the End of Time, the last reality of the Multiverse.

== Reception ==
=== Critical response ===
George Marston of Newsarama ranked Kang the Conqueror 2nd in their "Best Avengers Villains Of All Time" list. IGN ranked Kang the Conqueror 16th in their "Top 25 Marvel Villains" list, and 65th in their "Top 100 Comic Book Villains" list. Marco Vito Oddo of Collider ranked Kang the Conqueror 20th in their "20 Most Powerful Marvel Characters" list.

Screen Rant included Kang the Conqueror in their "Marvel: The Avengers Main Comic Book Villains, Ranked From Most Laughable To Coolest" list, in their "10 Best Spider-Ham Villains" list, in their "10 Most Powerful Avengers Villains In Marvel Comics" list, and in their "15 Most Powerful Black Panther Villains" list. CBR.com ranked Kang the Conqueror 2nd in their "Black Knight's 10 Strongest Villains" list, 3rd in their "10 Most Violent Marvel Villains" list, 4th in their "10 Fantastic Four Villains We Want To See In The MCU" list, 7th in their "13 Most Important Marvel Villains" list, 8th in their "10 Greatest Iron Man Enemies" list, and 10th in their "Ms. Marvel's 10 Best Villains" list.

== Other versions ==
=== Council of Cross-Time Kangs ===
Numerous versions and successors of Kang form the members of this organization, also known as the Council of Cross-Time Kangs. Among them are:

- Frederick "Fred" Kang, who named himself after the cartoon character Fred Flintstone.
- Nebula, later retconned as having been Ravonna in disguise.
- Kang Kong, a version of Kang from a dimension occupied by super-intelligent apes (later retroactively established as the Marvel Apes universe), named in reference to King Kong.

=== Earth-6311 ===
The Earth-6311 version of Kang the Conqueror is known as Myrddin. He is the founder of the Twilight Court, whose headquarters Camelot later became the Impossible City.

=== Heroes Reborn ===
An alternate universe version of Kang the Conqueror appears in Heroes Reborn. This version is the lover of Mantis. Seeking to prove his love for her, he travels to the present to battle and capture the Avengers. However, they eventually free themselves and defeat him. Kang and Mantis flee to Peru to plot revenge, only to be absorbed by Loki.

=== Spider-Geddon ===
An alternate universe version of Kang called Kang the Conglomerator appears in Edge of Spider-Geddon #1. This version is a businessman from the year 2099.

=== Spider-Ham ===
A funny animal-themed alternate universe version of Kang the Conqueror called Kangaroo the Conqueror appears in Peter Porker, The Spectacular Spider-Ham #15.

=== Ultimate Marvel ===
An alternate universe version of Kang the Conqueror, Sue Storm, appears in Ultimate Comics: The Ultimates.

In Ultimate Invasion, the Maker meets a Kang who is implied to be Tony Stark.

=== X-Men/Star Trek ===
An alternate universe version of Kang the Conqueror appears in the X-Men/Star Trek crossover Second Contact.

== Collected editions ==
Title	Material collected	Published date	ISBN
Kang: The Saga Of The Once And Future Conqueror	Fantastic Four (vol. 1) #19, Avengers (vol. 1) #8, All-New, All-Different Avengers #13, Avengers (vol. 7) 1–6, Avengers: Back to Basics #5-6, Moon Knight Annual (vol. 2) #1, Symbiote Spider-Man: King in Black #1-5, and material from Fantastic Four (vol. 6) #35, Timeless #1	January 2023	978-1302950675
Avengers: Kang Dynasty	Avengers (vol. 3) #41-55, Avengers Annual 2001	January 2002	978-0785109587
Kang the Conqueror: Only Myself Left to Conquer	Kang The Conqueror #1-5	February 2022	978-1302930356

== In other media ==
=== Television ===
- Rama-Tut appears in Fantastic Four (1967), voiced by Mike Road. This version rules as the pharaoh of Egypt in the year 2000 B.C., having traveled from the future using a time machine built by himself (which is revealed to be the Sphinx). Using a device of his own creation, he enslaves the Egyptian people, as well as the Fantastic Four, when they visit that era, intending to turn Susan Storm into his queen. Later, when trying to return to the future in his time machine, he is stopped by the Fantastic Four, and is killed when the time machine explodes.
- Kang the Conqueror appears in a self-titled episode of The Avengers: United They Stand, voiced by Ken Kramer. This version hails from the 41st century, where he was overthrown during a revolution and imprisoned between dimensions, with an obelisk as his only means of escape.
- Rama-Tut makes a cameo appearance in the X-Men: Evolution episode "Dark Horizon".
- Kang the Conqueror appears in The Avengers: Earth's Mightiest Heroes, voiced by Jonathan Adams. This version hails from the 41st century and is in a relationship with Princess Ravonna. Additionally, the Council of Kangs appears in the episode "New Avengers".
- Kang the Conqueror appears in Avengers Assemble, voiced by Steve Blum. This version hails from the 30th century and is an ally of the Cabal.
- Kang the Conqueror appears in Marvel Future Avengers, voiced by Jiro Saito in the Japanese version and again by Steve Blum in the English dub. This version is the leader of the Masters of Evil and the mastermind behind the Emerald Rain Project, an attempt to reverse-engineer Terrigen Crystals to create a race of superhumans under his control and defeat the Inhumans in his time.
- Kang the Conqueror, disguised as Rama-Tut, appears in the X-Men '97 episode "Rise of Apocalypse", voiced by John de Lancie. This version traveled back in time and landed in 3000 B.C. Egypt and ruled with an iron fist yet is challenged by En Sabah Nur and the Sandstormers, abandoning Egypt during Apocalypse's assault and returning to the future.

=== Marvel Cinematic Universe ===
Kang the Conqueror and his alternative variants appear in media set in the Marvel Cinematic Universe, portrayed by Jonathan Majors:

- He Who Remains appears in Loki. This version was an unnamed former "conqueror" and founder of the Time Variance Authority (TVA) based out of an asteroid at the end of time who sought to control the flow of the "Sacred Timeline" and prevent a new multiverse from forming due to a vast multiversal war having broken out in the previous one.
- Kang himself first appears in Ant-Man and the Wasp: Quantumania. A multiversal traveler in the newly created multiverse who believed that the multiverse was dying due to his variants, he attempted to instigate a war to stop them, only to be captured by the Council of Kangs — led by Immortus, Rama-Tut, and Centurion — and exiled to the Quantum Realm.
- Victor Timely appears in Quantumania and Loki, with Nasri Thompson portraying the character as a child. This version is an inventor from the 19th century who received a TVA handbook from former TVA members and became involved with them, the eponymous Loki, and Sylvie. Compared to his other variants, Loki producer Kevin R. Wright said it was "fun" to have Timely be "sort of an eccentric, quiet inventor that maybe is, like, a bit out of time and out of place" rather than the expectation of the origin of the variant who would become Kang "living in the 31st century" to actually be "some sci-fi villain from the future".

Majors's appearances as Kang and his variants were intended to lead into the character becoming the main antagonist of the MCU's Multiverse Saga. However, following the disappointing box-office performance of Ant-Man and the Wasp: Quantumania and Majors's arrest for domestic violence, it was reported that Kang's role in the MCU would be minimized or removed entirely. Marvel Studios fired Majors in December 2023, after he was convicted. Marvel Studios president Kevin Feige said in 2025 that they concluded ahead of the release of Quantumania that Kang "wasn't big enough, wasn't Thanos" and that another antagonist was needed. Doctor Doom later took over from Kang as the main antagonist of the Multiverse Saga, with the film Avengers: The Kang Dynasty being reworked into Avengers: Doomsday.

=== Video games ===
- Kang the Conqueror appears as a boss and unlockable playable character in Marvel Avengers Alliance.
- Kang the Conqueror appears as a boss in Marvel Contest of Champions.
- Kang the Conqueror appears as a boss and playable character in Lego Marvel Super Heroes 2, voiced by Peter Serafinowicz.
- The comics and MCU incarnations of Kang the Conqueror appear as unlockable playable characters in Marvel Puzzle Quest.

=== Miscellaneous ===
- Kang the Conqueror appears in the novel trilogy X-Men & Spider-Man: Time's Arrow, written by Tom DeFalco.
- Kang the Conqueror appears in the second Avengers: Earth's Mightiest Heroes tie-in comic book.
- Kang the Conqueror is referenced in a self-titled song written by Ookla the Mok for their 2013 album vs. Evil.
- The Council of Kangs, renamed the Timelines of Kang, appears in Legendary: A Marvel Deck Building Game's "Annihilation" expansion, consisting of Kang the Conqueror, Iron Lad, Rama-Tut, and the Scarlet Centurion.
- Kang the Conqueror was included in the first series of the Secret Wars toy line produced by Mattel and released in 1984 in support of the Secret Wars comic book mini-series.
