= Jesus Merino =

Spanish comic book artist (born 1965)

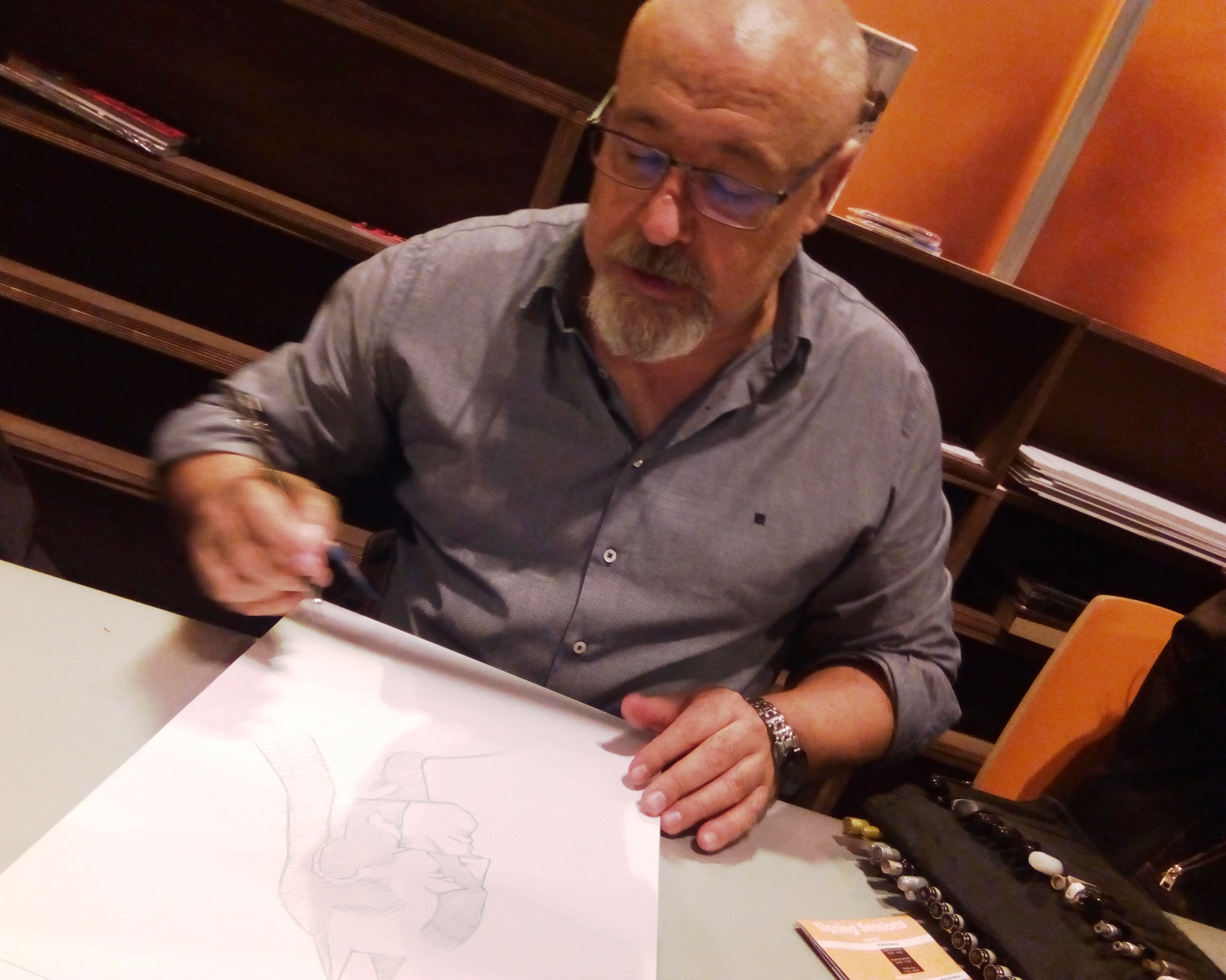
- Born: 1965 (age 60–61) Cádiz
- Areas: Penciller, Inker
- Notable works: JSA, vol. 3 Superman

Jesús Merino (born 1965) is a Spanish comic book artist, best known in the American comic industry for his collaborations with penciller Carlos Pacheco.

Merino himself raised from the Línea Laberinto of Planeta-DeAgostini Spanish publisher, where he drew three mini-series: Aníbal Gris (1996), Jaque Mate (1997) and Triada Vértice (1998). In 1998 he began to work with Pacheco, inking his layouts on titles such as Avengers Forever, Superman/Batman and Green Lantern.

Merino's work on DC included art for many issues of Justice Society of America, vol. 3 and a Superman/Batman story.

In September 2011, DC launched a new Superman series written by George Pérez with art by Pérez and Merino.

== Bibliography ==
- Action Comics #865 (full art); #900-901 (among other artists) (2008-11)
- Justice Society of America, vol. 3, #29-33, 36–40, 43 (2009–10)
- Superman, vol. 1, #669, 673, 684 (2007–09)
- Superman, vol. 3, #1-4 (2011-12)
- Superman/Batman #79 (2011)
- Superman's Pal Jimmy Olsen Special #1 (among other artists) (2008)
