= Kang Dynasty =

2001–02 Marvel Comics storyline

- The Kang Dynasty. Cover to Avengers v3, #49; Art by Kieron Dwyer
- Publisher: Marvel Comics
- Publication date: June 2001 – August 2002
- Genre: Superhero
- Title(s): Avengers (vol. 3) #41–55; Avengers Annual 2001
- Main character(s): Avengers; Kang the Conqueror

Creative team
- Writer: Kurt Busiek
- Artist(s): Alan Davis; Kieron Dwyer; Rick Remender; Ivan Reis; Manuel Garcia

"Kang Dynasty", sometimes called "Kang War", is a 16 part comic book storyline which ran through Avengers (vol. 3) #41–55 and Avengers Annual 2001 between June 2001 and August 2002. It was written by Kurt Busiek and illustrated by several artists, including Alan Davis, Kieron Dwyer, Ivan Reis, and Manuel Garcia.

The story features Kang the Conqueror, a warlord from the 30th century, and one of the Avengers' oldest and deadliest foes, arriving in the early 21st century with his son Marcus, intent on conquering the planet. Although Kang is temporarily successful, he is opposed and eventually defeated by the Avengers.

The story is noteworthy for its length, as well as depicting the destruction of the United Nations headquarters building (though without loss of life, as Kang saved them all to make a point) and the death of the entire population of Washington, D.C.; it had been planned before the 2001 September 11 attacks, but was published afterwards as Marvel Comics decided not to alter the storyline.

== Plot summary ==
Kang the Conqueror appears with his son Marcus, the new Scarlet Centurion, in front of the United Nations after Marcus is barely defeated by Goliath, Triathlon, Iron Man, Vision, Wasp, and Warbird, and destroys the United Nations building. However, Kang reveals that none of the building's occupants were killed. Kang creates a force-field around the group, and shows many visions of the Earth's possible futures, all of them dark and horrific. At first it is thought he intends to help the Earth, but then he announces that he wishes to conquer it to save it. Kang tells the United Nations that he will strike France first. He then announces that any who conquer land in his name will have a place in his new order. Kang teleports away with the Centurion, threatening to strike with lethal force.

Kang launches his invasion of Europe with his army from the far future. The Avengers try to infiltrate Kang's starship, Damocles. After the attack fails, the Avengers who had launched the attack (including Captain America) are stranded in space. Kang uses a futuristic weapon to attack Washington, D.C., killing millions. With the threat of more such attacks, the world has no choice but to surrender to Kang, with the Wasp personally doing so for the Avengers. Warbird, with assistance from Scarlet Centurion, kills the Master of the World, who has created technological towers capable of resisting Kang.

The Avengers stranded in space are saved by Quasar and warned that the Triple Evil has arrived; an enormous floating black pyramid on the far side of the Moon. On Earth, Kang and the Scarlet Centurion are gloating over their victory when they are told the Avengers are attacking their main prison. Thor and the Avengers left on Earth free Wasp and many other heroes, taking them to the Master's base, which they use as their new base of operations. The Avengers plan to distract Kang so that Warbird, Thor, Iron Man, Wonder Man and Firestar can attack Damocles.

Captain America's team in space heads for Earth, using the pyramid's power. On Earth, Kang declares that he will destroy a city each hour until the Avengers surrender. Across the world, others assault Kang's forces. With his forces locked in a counter-attack, Kang and Scarlet Centurion retreat to Damocles. From there, he locates the Avengers' new base and opens fire on it. Facing a no-win situation, the five heroes who had agreed to attack his base take off. Just as Kang is about to triumph, the pyramid materializes beside Damocles, opening fire on it. Kang projects a giant hologram, but is confronted by Captain America, who has created a similar projection.

Vision, Quasar, Justice, Jack of Hearts, Firestar, and Photon attack Kang's base along with the pyramid. Damocles focuses fire on the pyramid, allowing the Earth defenses to attack it, even as the heroes from Earth join the battle against it. Kang has the edge on Captain America and is about to defeat him, but the damage to Damocles becomes so severe that Kang is unable to maintain the holographic projection.

The Avengers assault the base, and Warbird destroys the main core. Kang forces Scarlet Centurion to take a capsule to his own time, leaving Kang to die honorably. The Avengers evacuate as Damocles plunges to Earth. Kang survives, finding the Avengers waiting as he emerges from the ruin. Captain America defeats Kang in battle, and takes him into captivity.

Kang, in his cell, is content to die, but Scarlet Centurion arrives and saves him. An angry Kang tells Marcus that he should not have done so, but returns to his ship. Kang takes Marcus into his private chambers, which is revealed to be a morgue with twenty-two bodies, all of them duplicates of Marcus. Kang tells him that he is not the first Marcus, but the previous ones had always proved unsuitable. Seeing Marcus as a traitor for helping Warbird during the conflict, Kang kills him.

== Bibliography ==
- Avengers (vol. 3) #41 "The High Ground" (June 2001)
- Avengers (vol. 3) #42 "No More Tomorrows" (July 2001)
- Avengers (vol. 3) #43 "Global Presence" (August 2001)
- Avengers Annual 2001 "The Third Man" / "Desperate Measures" / "Secrets Within" (2001)
- Avengers (vol. 3) #44 "Down Among the Dead Men!" (September 2001)
- Avengers (vol. 3) #45 "Life During Wartime" (October 2001)
- Avengers (vol. 3) #46 "Absolute Mastery" (November 2001)
- Avengers (vol. 3) #47 "In the Heart of Battle" (December 2001)
- Avengers (vol. 3) #48 "Warplan "A" (January 2002)
- Avengers (vol. 3) #49 "There are No Words" (February 2002; part of the 'Nuff Said event)
- Avengers (vol. 3) #50 "Book of Revelations" (March 2002)
- Avengers (vol. 3) #51 "Prisoners – A Love Story" (April 2002)
- Avengers (vol. 3) #52 "Counter Attack" (May 2002)
- Avengers (vol. 3) #53 "The Last Castle" (June 2002)
- Avengers (vol. 3) #54 "Good Day To Die" (July 2002)
- Avengers (vol. 3) #55 "The Last Farewell" (August 2002)
