= Nathaniel Richards (Marvel Comics) =

Time-traveling scientist appearing in Marvel Comics

Publication information
- Publisher: Marvel Comics
- First appearance: The Fantastic Four #272 (November 1984)
- Created by: John Byrne

In-story information
- Species: Human
- Team affiliations: Future Foundation; Fantastic Four; Brotherhood of the Shield
- Abilities: Genius-level intellect; Time travel; Teleportation; Powered armor

Nathaniel Richards is a character appearing in American comic books published by Marvel Comics. He is the father of superhero Mister Fantastic of the Fantastic Four and is the namesake of his descendant, the futuristic villain known as Kang the Conqueror. Unlike his descendant, the original Nathaniel is more of an adventurer who has a genuine love for his son.

== Publication history ==
Nathaniel Richards first appeared in The Fantastic Four #272 (November 1984) and was created by writer-artist John Byrne.

== Fictional character biography ==
Dr. Nathaniel Richards is a successful scientist who specializes in multiple fields. He was married to Evelyn and together had a son named Reed Richards who possessed an intellectual mind like his father. When Evelyn died, Nathaniel continued to raise his son by supporting his scientific endeavors. Later, Nathaniel is approached by the Brotherhood of the Shield and joins their group. Along with Howard Stark, Nathaniel helps resolve a dispute between Leonardo da Vinci and Isaac Newton. These events resulted in Nathaniel gaining the ability to travel through time.

Nathaniel ends up in another dimension where Earth became a desolate wasteland after the Moon was destroyed. He marries a woman named Cassandra, who exploits his technology to rule the remaining humans. The Fantastic Four and Wyatt Wingfoot arrive in this dimension, defeat Cassandra, and free Nathaniel.

Nathaniel arrives in the present to kidnap Franklin Richards. Nathaniel ages Franklin to a teenager in an effort to prevent the birth of the villain Hyperstorm, Franklin's future son.

Nathaniel returns to help Reed jump-start the Future Foundation, using the technology he gathered over the years.

== Powers and abilities ==
Nathaniel Richards has no superpowers, but he is a scientific genius and skilled inventor in advanced technology. He invented a device called the Time Platform, which allows him to travel through time. The armor that he built on his own granted him increased strength, physical resistance, and access to various gadgets, as well as energy weapons for defense.

== Other versions ==
=== The Beast ===
A version of Nathaniel Richards pulled into the far future with the other Nathaniels by Immortus, called the Beast, was a homicidal maniac who took the opportunity to slaughter all of his counterparts.

=== Ultimate Marvel ===
In the Ultimate Marvel reality, Reed Richards's father is named Gary Richards and he does not have a scientific background. Gary, along with his wife Mary and two daughters, are killed in an explosion engineered by Reed after he becomes the Maker.

=== What If? ===
Nathaniel Richards appears in two What If stories:

- In "What if the Fantastic Four were Cosmonauts?", Nathaniel was interned in a Siberian camp after the United States lost faith in the USSR.
- In another reality based on Camelot, Nathaniel Richards is a counterpart of Merlin.

== In other media ==
A variation of Nathaniel Richards known as Mr. Richards appears in Fantastic Four (2015), portrayed by Tim Heidecker. This version is Reed's stepfather.

== See also ==
- Kang the Conqueror
- Immortus
- Iron Lad
