= Immortus =

Fictional character appearing in Marvel Comics

Publication information
- Publisher: Marvel Comics
- First appearance: The Avengers #10 (November 1964)
- Created by: Stan Lee; Jack Kirby

In-story information
- Alter ego: Nathaniel Richards
- Species: Human
- Team affiliations: The Time Keepers; Time Variance Authority; The Brotherhood of Badoon; Church of Immortus
- Notable aliases: Kang the Conqueror; Pharaoh Rama-Tut; Iron Lad; Kang the Immortal; Master of Time; Pope Immortus; Scarlet Centurion; Whisperer
- Abilities: Genius-Level Intellect; Time manipulation; Immortality

Immortus (/ɪˈmɔːrtəs/; Nathaniel Richards) is a fictional character appearing in American comic books published by Marvel Comics. He is the future self of Pharaoh Rama-Tut, Scarlet Centurion, Kang the Conqueror, and Iron Lad / Kid Immortus, and a descendant of the scientist of the same name.

Immortus made his feature film debut in the Marvel Cinematic Universe (MCU) film Ant-Man and the Wasp: Quantumania (2023), portrayed by Jonathan Majors.

== Publication history ==
Immortus first appeared in The Avengers #10 (November 1964), and was created by Stan Lee and Jack Kirby. In The Celestial Madonna Saga, Immortus was retroactively established to be the future self of the time-travelling Pharaoh Rama-Tut and Kang the Conqueror, having turned towards a more peaceful outlook on existence.

== Fictional character biography ==
At some point in his personal timeline, Rama-Tut (formerly known as Kang) became weary of battle due to frustration and the loss of his son Marcus and consort Ravonna in several timelines. He was approached by the alien Time-Keepers—time travelers from the end of the universe, the last living creatures in existence—to become their agent, preserving timelines rather than conquering them in exchange for immortality. He accepted and reinvented himself again as Immortus, the lord of the other-dimensional realm of Limbo.

In his first encounter with the Avengers, Immortus attempts to destroy them by recruiting mythological and historical figures (such as Paul Bunyan, Attila the Hun, and Goliath) as combatants. The Masters of Evil attack the Avengers after Captain America had been taken to the Tower of London in 1760, where Rick Jones is imprisoned. After Rick is rescued, he and Captain America return to the present and the Masters of Evil are defeated. Immortus was partially responsible for the creation of the Vision, allegedly creating a temporal copy of the original Human Torch that the android Ultron used to create the Vision.

Immortus allies with Kang the Conqueror in one of Kang's schemes against the Avengers and Rama-Tut. He is betrayed by Kang and imprisoned alongside Rama-Tut while Kang uses Immortus's advanced technology to create the first Legion of the Unliving, made up of dead heroes and villains who are rescued just before they would have died. Immortus is freed by the Avengers and revealed to be the future persona of Rama-Tut and Kang. He offers to aid Vision in learning his past. The Legion of the Unliving are defeated and sent back to their own times, and Kang flees.

Immortus officiates the weddings of Vision to Scarlet Witch, and Mantis to Swordsman. He assists the Avengers in battling Kang on two separate occasions. Immortus later reveals that he had caused Kang to find his fortress in Limbo, faked his death by leaving what Kang thought were his remains in his fortress, caused a disturbance in the timestream, and manipulated him into destroying the Kang divergent doubles to stop their effect on the timestream, as they were creating more timelines and duplicates. The Avengers are brought to Limbo by Kang to help him defeat another version. When Kang tries to seize a device Immortus held that contained the memories of the dead alternate Kangs, he is driven insane. Immortus is questioned by the Avengers on the morality of his actions, but refuses to answer and sends the Avengers back to their own time.

Immortus develops a long-term plot to manipulate the Avengers, which involves him erasing several timelines from existence. He is rendered catatonic for a time by the Time-Keepers as punishment for his attempt to overthrow them. After recovering, Immortus manipulates beliefs regarding the relationship between the Human Torch and Vision. Scarlet Witch is a 'nexus being' whose children who could threaten the cosmic entities; Immortus disrupting her relationship with the Vision limits the possibility of her having children.

Immortus is responsible for manipulating Iron Man to turn against the Avengers by driving him insane, which results in Iron Man's death until he is resurrected by Franklin Richards.

Immortus comes into conflict with his younger self, who is unable to see the reasoning behind Immortus's and Rama-Tut's actions. Kang's conflict with Immortus is dubbed the "Destiny War", with Kang aiding a group of temporally displaced Avengers from multiple time periods in competing against Immortus's schemes. Kang is determined to defy his and Rama-Tut's destiny to become Immortus and become the servant of the Time Keepers.

Immortus fakes his death several times before turning on the Time-Keepers to assist the Avengers, only to be killed as punishment. He is resurrected minutes later as temporal energy from the Time-Keepers' attempts to turn Kang directly into Immortus causes a backlash that causes Rama-Tut, Kang, and Immortus to become separate beings.

When Kang's actions cause the timestream to become critically unbalanced, Immortus allies with the Next Avengers and future versions of Iron Man and the Hulk in an attempt to undo the damage. Disguising himself as a younger version of Kang, Immortus travels to the 21st century and convinces the Avengers to come to the future so that they can understand what had happened. Once the Avengers restore the timeline, Immortus turns on his allies and kills Iron Man and Hulk before the Avengers apparently kill him.

== Powers and abilities ==
Immortus has no superpowers, but he does possess a genius-level intellect and has amassed extensive scientific knowledge, especially regarding time travel. It is known that he was tutored by the Time-Keepers themselves, due to him being virtually immortal.

== Reception ==
In 2022, Screen Rant included Immortus in their "10 Most Powerful Hercules Villains In Marvel Comics" list.

== Other versions ==
An alternate universe version of Immortus appears in Earth X, as Pope of the Church of Immortus. The Church of Immortus's goals are to destroy Reed Richards' Human Torches, allowing mankind to keep their mutations. Upon completing this goal, the Church of Immortus would leave Earth to colonize the stars. Immortus is advised by a mysterious man known as Mr. Church, who is Mephisto attempting to lead mankind into its own demise.

Immortus is mutated into Kang after being exposed to Terrigen Mists and destroys his time machine in a rage, cursing Mephisto for making him Kang again. In his final appearance in the series, he has come to grips with being Kang and vows to help Reed Richards undo the damage caused by the Church of Immortus.

== In other media ==
=== Television ===
Immortus makes an appearance in the X-Men: The Animated Series episode "Beyond Good and Evil", voiced by Stephen Ouimette. This version assumes the identity of time-stream "custodial engineer" Bender.

=== Marvel Cinematic Universe ===
Characters inspired by Immortus appear in media set in the Marvel Cinematic Universe (MCU), portrayed by Jonathan Majors.

- A composite character partially inspired by Immortus and He Who Remains and named after the latter appears in the Disney+ series Loki episode "For All Time. Always." as the creator of the Time Variance Authority.
- Immortus debuts in the film Ant-Man and the Wasp: Quantumania as a leading member of the Council of Kangs.
