= Mister Fantastic =

Marvel Comics superhero

- Cover of Fantastic Four (vol. 8) #6 (December 2025). Penciled by Jack Kirby and painted by Joe Jusko.

Publication information
- Publisher: Marvel Comics
- First appearance: Fantastic Four #1 (November. 1961)
- Created by: Stan Lee (writer); Jack Kirby (artist)

In-story information
- Alter ego: Dr. Reed Richards
- Species: Human mutate
- Team affiliations: Fantastic Four; Avengers; Future Foundation; Defenders; Illuminati
- Notable aliases: Invincible Man, Reed Benjamin
- Abilities: Genius-level intellect; Exceptional engineer, physicist, biologist, and chemist; Superhuman elasticity, malleability, and durability; Limited shapeshifting

Dr. Reed Richards, also known as Mister Fantastic, is a superhero appearing in American comic books published by Marvel Comics. He was created by Stan Lee and Jack Kirby. The character is a founding member and the leader of the Fantastic Four. Richards has a mastery of mechanical, aerospace and electrical engineering, chemistry, all levels of physics, and human and alien biology. BusinessWeek listed Mister Fantastic as one of the top ten most intelligent fictional characters in American comics. He is the inventor of the spacecraft that was bombarded by cosmic radiation on its maiden voyage, granting the Fantastic Four their powers. Richards gained the ability to stretch his body into any shape he desires.

Mister Fantastic acts as the leader and father figure of the Fantastic Four, and although his cosmic ray powers are primarily stretching abilities, his presence on the team is defined by his scientific acumen, as he is officially acknowledged as the smartest man alive within the Marvel Universe. This is particularly a point of tragedy in regards to his best friend, Ben Grimm, who he has constantly tried to turn back into his human form but who typically remains in a large, rocky form and is called the Thing. Richards is the husband of Susan Storm, father of Franklin Richards and Valeria Richards, and mentor to his brother-in-law, Johnny Storm. Mister Fantastic's archenemy is Doctor Doom, who is obsessed with proving his intellectual superiority over Reed Richards and has often manipulated events in Mister Fantastic's life, resulting in various clashes with the Fantastic Four.

The character was portrayed by actors Alex Hyde-White in the 1994 The Fantastic Four film, Ioan Gruffudd in the 2005 film Fantastic Four and its 2007 sequel Fantastic Four: Rise of the Silver Surfer, and Miles Teller in the 2015 film Fantastic Four. In the Marvel Cinematic Universe franchise, John Krasinski portrayed a variant of Richards in the 2022 film Doctor Strange in the Multiverse of Madness, while Pedro Pascal portrayed the primary Richards in the 2025 film The Fantastic Four: First Steps and will reprise the role in the 2026 film Avengers: Doomsday and the 2027 film Avengers: Secret Wars.

== Creation ==
During an interview, Lee stated the inspiration behind the character's powers:

"I liked Plastic Man. That's a great power, and nobody is using it so I gave Reed Richards Plastic Man's power."

== Publication history ==
Mister Fantastic first appeared in The Fantastic Four #1 (Nov. 1961), created by Stan Lee and Jack Kirby. He marries Sue Storm in Fantastic Four Annual #3 (July 1965).

== Fictional character biography ==
Reed Richards is the son of Evelyn and Nathaniel Richards. Nathaniel was a scientific genius, and Reed inherited a similar level of intellect and interests. A child prodigy with special aptitude in mathematics, physics, and mechanics, Reed Richards was taking college-level courses when he was 14. He attended such prestigious universities as the Massachusetts Institute of Technology, California Institute of Technology, Harvard University, Columbia University, and the fictional Empire State University. By the age of 20, he had several degrees in the sciences under his belt.

It was at Empire State University that he met Benjamin J. Grimm. Reed had already begun designing a starship capable of traveling in hyperspace. Sharing his plans with his new roommate, Grimm jokingly volunteered to pilot the craft.

Also while at State U he met a brilliant fellow student, Victor Von Doom. In Richards, Doom met the first person who could match him intellectually; regarding Richards as his ultimate rival, Doom became increasingly jealous of Richards. Determined to prove he was better, Doom conducted reckless experiments which eventually scarred his face and would lead him to become Doctor Doom.

During the summer months, Reed rented a room in a boarding house owned by the aunt of Susan Storm, who was an undergraduate student at the time. Susan immediately fell in love with Reed.

Moving on to Harvard, Reed earned PhDs in Physics and Electrical Engineering while working as a military scientist, all this by the age of 22. He also worked in communications for the Army and was involved in the Sin-Cong Conflict. Three years later, in his mid-20s, Reed used his inheritance, along with government funding, to finance his research. Determined to go to Mars and beyond, Richards based the fateful project in Central City. Susan Storm moved into the area, and within a short time, found herself engaged to Reed. Reed's old college roommate, Ben Grimm, now a successful test pilot and astronaut, was indeed slated to pilot the craft. When the government threatened to cut funding and cancel the project, Reed, Ben, Sue, and Sue's younger brother Johnny, agreed to sneak aboard the starship and take it up immediately. They knew they had not completed all the testing that had been planned, but Reed was confident they would be safe. Ben was initially skeptical about the unknown effects of radiation, while Reed theorized that their ship's shielding would be adequate to protect them.

It was on Reed's initiative that the fateful mission which had Susan Storm, Johnny Storm and Ben Grimm accompanying him into space took place. When their ship passed through the Van Allen belt they found their cockpit bombarded with nearly lethal doses of cosmic radiation. Reed had neglected to account for the abnormal radiation levels in the belt's atmosphere. The cosmic rays wreaked havoc on the starship's insufficient shielding and they were forced to return to Earth immediately. When they crash-landed they found that their bodies were changed dramatically. Reed's body was elastic and he could reshape any portion of his body at will. At his suggestion, they decided to use their new abilities to serve mankind as the Fantastic Four. Reed was chosen to lead the group, under the name "Mr. Fantastic".

This history has been changed over the years to keep it current. In the original comics, Richards was a veteran of World War II who had served behind enemy lines in occupied France, and the goal of his space mission was a crewed space flight to the Moon before the Communists were able to. This was later changed to getting there before the Chinese Communists and to explore the interstellar areas of the red planet and beyond. Also, Reed originally states that he and Sue "were kids together" and that Sue was the "girl next door" who Reed left behind to go fight in the war. This origin story was, many years later, altered so that Sue was thirteen years old when she first met Reed, who was in his early twenties, at her Aunt Marygay's boardinghouse. Current official Marvel canon has since altered this origin story by combining elements of both—it eliminated the large age gap but maintained that Reed and Sue did not meet until their late teens at Aunt Marygay's boardinghouse. The change in age was an editorial decision made in 2013 as Reed developing, several years later, a romantic interest in a girl he first met when she was thirteen years old was deemed inappropriate.

=== Leadership of the Fantastic Four ===
As leader of the Fantastic Four, Mr. Fantastic creates numerous exotic devices and vehicles for the team to use such as clothing made of 'unstable molecules' so that it can be used with their powers safely. Furthermore, he often leads the team into daring expeditions such as into the Negative Zone in addition to opposing evil. Also, he has felt personally responsible for Ben Grimm's transformation and has labored off and on to reverse it permanently.

Under his guidance, the team became a prominent group of superheroes and participated in numerous missions to protect Earth. Reed is known for his scientific and technological expertise and has developed multiple inventions for the team. Patents and royalties from his inventions have also provided funding for the group.

However, there are drawbacks to his association with the team. Chief among them is the team's violent encounters with Doctor Doom, who believes that Reed was responsible for the accident that scarred him. Doom has never forgiven Reed and has sworn revenge.

=== Subplots and story arcs ===
After many adventures as the Fantastic Four, Reed marries Sue. Before long Reed and Sue had a baby, Franklin; the team battled Annihilus right before Franklin's birth. Reed also saved Galactus's life during the course of his adventures. Reed is tried by the Shi'ar for saving Galactus's life, but the charges are dropped when Eternity briefly grants all those attending the trial a moment of 'cosmic awareness' that allows them to understand that Galactus is necessary for the continued well-being of the universe. Some time later, Reed and Sue retired from the Fantastic Four and temporarily join the Avengers.

Mister Fantastic and Doctor Doom are transported to the distant past of another planet by Hyperstorm, Reed's grandchild from an alternate future. During their absence, the Fantastic Four recruit Scott Lang as a scientific advisor. Some time later, Galactus defeats Hyperstorm, allowing Doom and Mister Fantastic to return to the present day.

=== Pro-Registration ===
In Marvel's "Civil War" miniseries and crossover event, Reed Richards is one of the leading figures, along with Iron Man, on the side which is in favor of the Superhuman Registration Act. He speculates that this will lead to conflict with his wife, which came true in issue #4 of the miniseries when Ragnarok, a clone of Thor created by Reed and Tony Stark, kills Goliath and nearly kills all the rest of the Secret Avengers until Sue Storm steps in and saves them. Soon after, Sue leaves Reed, along with Johnny, to join the Secret Avengers in hopes that it would drive Reed to end the conflict quickly.

In the final battle of the war, Reed is shot by Taskmaster while protecting Sue. With Reed on the brink of death, a furious Sue crushes Taskmaster with a telekinetic field. Reed survives, however, and Sue returns to him in the aftermath of the battle, having been granted amnesty. Seeking to repair the damage done to their marriage as a result of the war, Sue and Reed take time off from the Fantastic Four, but ask Storm and the Black Panther to take their places in the meantime.

=== World War Hulk ===
In the storyline World War Hulk, the Hulk returns to Earth after being exiled into space by Mister Fantastic and the Illuminati. Mister Fantastic, among other heroes, are captured and implanted with "obedience disks" to suppress their powers. The Hulk orders Iron Man and Mr. Fantastic to face off in battle. However, the Hulk spares their lives, showing them that he proved his point to the world. They survived the encounter by Hulk's mercy and the timely intervention of Sentry.

=== Secret Invasion ===
Mister Fantastic and Hank Pym autopsy the body of the Skrull who impersonated Elektra (with Reed pretending to be seeing the corpse for the first time, thus keeping the secret of the Illuminati). After completing the dissection, Reed claims to have discovered the secret of how the Skrulls have been able to conceal their identities. Before he can elaborate, Pym reveals himself to be a Skrull imposter and shoots Reed with a weapon that leaves his elastic body in a state of disarray similar to Silly String. Reed is freed by Abigail Brand, and then travels with her to the Savage Land and uses a device to reveal all the Skrull invaders present.

=== Future Foundation ===
Tragedy strikes the team when the Human Torch is apparently killed. As the Fantastic Four recover from Johnny's apparent death, Mister Fantastic grows disillusioned at how scientists see science and its applications. Therefore, he creates a new team, the Future Foundation, to help create a better future for mankind. After the Human Torch returns and the team resume using the Fantastic Four name, they are attacked by the mysterious Quiet Man, a figure who reveals that he has been behind many of the villain attacks the Fantastic Four have faced over the years.

=== Secret Wars ===
During the Secret Wars storyline, Reed is one of the few survivors of Earth-616 to come through with his memories intact, hiding in a 'life raft' with various other heroes and eventually released by Doctor Strange. Learning that the new 'Battleworld' is now ruled by Doctor Doom, who has absorbed the power of various Beyonders and Molecule Men to become a virtual god, Reed and the other heroes disperse across Battleworld to come up with a plan. Reed eventually starts working with his counterpart from the Ultimate Marvel universe who calls himself Maker. The two find themselves disagreeing on their methods, with Reed preferring to find a way to save the world while Maker is more focused on killing their enemy, Reed countering his other self's accusations that he is weak by musing that he simply has things to care for outside of himself. In the final confrontation, Reed and the Maker discover that the source of Doom's power is the Molecule Man, but although the Maker attempts to betray Reed by forcibly devolving him into an ape, Reece reverses the Maker's attack and turns him into pizza. When Doom comes down to confront Reed, Reed challenges Doom as Reece temporarily deprives Doom of his new god-level powers, Reed proclaiming Doom to be nothing more than a coward for taking control of what was left of existence rather than trying to reshape it. Inspired by Reed's words, Reece transfers Doom's power to him, with Reed combining his powers with those of Franklin Richards to gradually rebuild the multiverse.

== Powers and abilities ==
Reed Richards gained the power of elasticity from irradiation by cosmic rays. He has the ability to convert his entire body into a highly malleable state at will, allowing him to stretch, deform, and reform himself into virtually any shape. Richards has been observed as being able to use his stretching form in a variety of offensive and defensive manners, such as compressing himself into a ball and ricocheting into enemies, flattening himself into a trampoline or a parachute to catch a falling teammate, or inflating himself into a life raft to aid in a water rescue. He can willfully reduce his body's cohesion until he reaches a fluid state, which can flow through minute openings or into tiny pipes. Reed is also able to shape his hands into hammer and mace style weapons, and concentrate his mass into his fists to increase their density and effectiveness as weapons. Reed's control over his shape has been developed to such a point that he has been able to radically alter his facial features and his entire physical form to take the form of inanimate objects.

Having an elastic-like texture allows Reed protection from damage. He can be punched with incredible force, flattened, squished, and still re-form or survive without any form of significant injury.

For virtually his entire publication history, Mister Fantastic has been depicted as one of the most intelligent characters in the Marvel Universe. A visionary theoretician and an inspired machine smith, he has made breakthroughs in such varied fields as space travel, time travel, extra-dimensional travel, biochemistry, robotics, computers, synthetic polymers, communications, mutations, transportation, holography, energy generation, and spectral analysis, among others. However, he is never afraid to admit when others have greater expertise in certain fields than him, such as recognizing that Doctor Octopus possesses greater knowledge of radiation, that Hank Pym is a superior biochemist, or that Spider-Man can think of a problem from a biology perspective where he would be unable to do so, since his expertise is in physics. Richards has earned PhDs in Mathematics, Physics, and Engineering. His patents are so valuable that he is able to bankroll the Fantastic Four, Inc., without any undue financial stress. Mind control is rarely effective on him and when it does work, it wears off sooner than it would on a normal person, due to what he describes as an "elastic consciousness". However, this intelligence can be a handicap in his dealings with magic, as it required an intense lesson from Doctor Strange and facing the threat of his son being trapped in Hell for Reed to fully acknowledge that the key to using magic was to accept that he would never understand it.

Richards is among Earth's greatest experts in judo, and has many years of combat experience with the Fantastic Four.

Following the Battleworld crisis, Reed has acquired the powers of the Beyonders that were once wielded by Doom, but he relies on his son Franklin's creativity and new powers to help him recreate the multiverse after the incursions destroyed the other parallel universes.

== Equipment and technology ==
Although the Fantastic Four have numerous devices, crafts, and weapons, there are some items that Reed Richards carries with him at all times.

Fantastiflare: Launches a fiery "4" into the sky that is used during combat situations to let other members of the group know their location.

Uniform Computer: Like all the Fantastic Four's costumes and the rest of Reed's wardrobe, his suit is made of "unstable molecules". This means that the suit is attuned to his powers, which is why Johnny's costume does not burn when he "flames on", Sue's costume turns invisible when she does, and Reed's costume stretches with him. The costume also insulates them from electrical assaults. In addition, the team's uniforms are also, in essence, wearable computers. Their costumes have a complete data processing and telemetry system woven into the material of the uniform on a molecular level. This forms a network with the entire team, providing a constant, real-time uplink of everyone's physical condition as well as their location and current situation. The suit is capable of displaying data and touch-pad controls on the gauntlets. Its sensors can track all of the team's uniforms and provide a picture of their immediate vicinity. The suit has an intricate scanner system which can detect things around the wearer, from how many people are in the next room to what dimension or planet they are on. Reed can also up-link the bodysuit to any computer by stretching his fingertips to filament size and plugging them into an I/O data-port. With this, Reed can establish a fairly comprehensive database of any computer's cybernetic protocols and encryption algorithms.

== In other media ==
=== Television ===
- Mister Fantastic appears in Fantastic Four (1967), voiced by Gerald Mohr.
- Mister Fantastic appears in The New Fantastic Four, voiced by Mike Road.
- Mister Fantastic appears in Fantastic Four (1994), voiced by Beau Weaver. This version was married to Sue Storm prior to them obtaining their powers.
- Mister Fantastic appears in The Incredible Hulk episode "Fantastic Fortitude", voiced again by Beau Weaver.
- Mister Fantastic appears in the Spider-Man: The Animated Series three-part episode "Secret Wars", voiced by Cam Clarke.
- Mister Fantastic appears in Fantastic Four: World's Greatest Heroes, voiced by Hiro Kanagawa. This version is not married to Sue Storm.
- Mister Fantastic appears in The Super Hero Squad Show, voiced by James Marsters.
- Mister Fantastic appears in The Avengers: Earth's Mightiest Heroes, voiced by Dee Bradley Baker.
- Mister Fantastic appears in the Hulk and the Agents of S.M.A.S.H. episode "Monsters No More", voiced by Robin Atkin Downes.
- Mister Fantastic appears in Marvel Super Hero Adventures, voiced by Bill Newton.
- Mister Fantastic appears in Spidey and His Amazing Friends, voiced by Mario Lopez.

=== Film ===
- Mister Fantastic appears in The Fantastic Four (1994), portrayed by Alex Hyde-White.
- Mister Fantastic appears in Fantastic Four (2005), portrayed by Ioan Gruffudd. This version is initially fiscally incompetent and nearing bankruptcy, forcing him to seek investment from Victor von Doom to further his projects.
- Mister Fantastic appears in Fantastic Four: Rise of the Silver Surfer, portrayed again by Ioan Gruffudd. By this time, he has become engaged to Sue Storm.
- Mister Fantastic makes a non-speaking cameo appearance in Planet Hulk as a member of the Illuminati.
- Mister Fantastic appears in Fantastic Four (2015), portrayed by Miles Teller. This version, along with the rest of the Fantastic Four, obtained his powers from a botched expedition to a parallel dimension called "Planet Zero".
- An alternate universe variant of Mister Fantastic appears in the Marvel Cinematic Universe (MCU) film Doctor Strange in the Multiverse of Madness, portrayed by John Krasinski. This version is a member of the Illuminati and the Baxter Foundation from Earth-838 who is later killed by the Scarlet Witch.
- Mister Fantastic appears in the MCU film The Fantastic Four: First Steps (2025), portrayed by Pedro Pascal.
- Mister Fantastic will appear in the MCU films Avengers: Doomsday (2026) and Avengers: Secret Wars (2027), portrayed again by Pedro Pascal.

=== Video games ===
- Mister Fantastic appears as an assist character in Spider-Man (1995).
- Mister Fantastic appears as a playable character in Fantastic Four (1997).
- Mister Fantastic appears as a playable character in Marvel: Ultimate Alliance, voiced by David Naughton. Additionally, his classic, New Marvel, original, and Ultimate Marvel designs appear as alternate skins.
- Mister Fantastic appears in Fantastic Four (2005), voiced by Ioan Gruffudd. Additionally, his comics design appears in bonus levels, voiced by Robin Atkin Downes.
- Mister Fantastic, based on Ioan Gruffudd's portrayal, appears in Fantastic Four: Rise of the Silver Surfer, voiced by Matthew Kaminsky.
- Mister Fantastic appears in Marvel: Ultimate Alliance 2, voiced by Robert Clotworthy. Additionally, his Ultimate Marvel design appears as an alternate skin. This version supports Iron Man and the Registration Acts.
- Mister Fantastic appears as a playable character in Marvel Super Hero Squad Online.
- Mister Fantastic makes a non-speaking cameo appearance in Frank West's ending in Ultimate Marvel vs. Capcom 3.
- Mister Fantastic appears in Pinball FX 2, voiced by Travis Willingham.
- Mister Fantastic appears as a playable character in Marvel: Avengers Alliance.
- Mister Fantastic initially appeared in Marvel Heroes, voiced by Wally Wingert, before he was removed on July 1, 2017 for legal reasons.
- Mister Fantastic appears as a playable character in Lego Marvel Super Heroes, voiced by Dee Bradley Baker.
- Mister Fantastic appears as a playable character in Marvel: Future Fight.
- Mister Fantastic appears as a playable character in Marvel Puzzle Quest.
- Mister Fantastic appears as a downloadable playable character in Marvel Ultimate Alliance 3: The Black Order via the "Shadow of Doom" DLC, voiced again by Wally Wingert.
- Mister Fantastic appears as a downloadable playable character in Marvel Rivals, voiced by Ian James Corlett.
- Mister Fantastic appears in Fortnite as part of a The Fantastic Four: First Steps promotional bundle.

== Bibliography ==
- Cebulski, C.B., ed. (2024). Marvel Encyclopedia: New Edition. DK. ISBN 978-0-593-84611-7.
