= Iron Lad =

Marvel Comics superhero

- Iron Lad. Art by Jim Cheung.

Publication information
- Publisher: Marvel Comics
- First appearance: Young Avengers #1 (April 2005)
- Created by: Allan Heinberg; Jim Cheung

In-story information
- Alter ego: Nathaniel Richards
- Species: Human
- Team affiliations: Young Avengers; Champions
- Partnerships: Cassie Lang / Stature; Ravonna; M'Kraan
- Notable aliases: Kang the Conqueror; Kid Immortus; Teen Immortus
- Abilities: Wears neurokinetic armor which responds to his thoughts and grants him: Superhuman strength; Flight; Energy blast projection; Magnetic field creation; Time travel; Shapeshifting; Ability to hack into computer systems

Iron Lad (Nathaniel "Nate" Richards) is a superhero character appearing in American comic books published by Marvel Comics. He is an adolescent version of Kang the Conqueror, armed with a bio-metal suit that responds to mental commands. He is named after his ancestor of the same name.

== Publication history ==
Iron Lad first appeared in Young Avengers #1 (April 2005), created by writer Allan Heinberg and artist Jim Cheung.

== Fictional character biography ==
Sixteen-year-old Nate Richards is rescued by his time-traveling adult self, the villainous Kang the Conqueror, moments before he would have been attacked by bullies. This event originally shaped Nate's development into a villain. Kang takes his teenage self through time to witness the future battles and glory that would result in his transformation into Kang the Conqueror, hoping to inspire him. However, it backfires and Nate is horrified at the life of evil his future self shows him. Kang presses Nate to accept his future by killing the bully who would have hospitalized him. Instead, Nate takes the time travel technology given to him by Kang and transports himself to the past, hoping to avoid his destiny.

He seeks the Avengers for assistance, but finds the Avengers disbanded. Seeking answers, he downloads the remnants of the destroyed Vision's operating system into his armor. This reveals a fail-safe plan created by Vision to reform the Avengers should they disband or fall in action by locating the next generation of Avengers, all of whom have some tie to the original team. Using this plan, Nate assembles his new team, the Young Avengers, with the purpose of defeating his future self and reshaping his own future. He models his armor after the Avenger Iron Man, calling himself Iron Lad, and forming a romantic relationship with fellow Young Avenger teammate Cassie Lang.

Eventually, Kang comes to the past looking for Nate, wanting to return his younger self to his proper place in the timestream. When Nate refuses to return, Kang battles the Avengers until Iron Lad kills him with Hawkeye's sword. Kang's death alters the timeline, causing the Avengers to be killed and Young Avengers Wiccan and Hulkling to disappear. Iron Lad realizes that the only way to restore everything is to go back to his time and assume his role as Kang the Conqueror. In doing so, he will also lose his memories of his time in the past as a Young Avenger. Before he goes back in time, he asks his teammates to forgive him for the actions he will commit in the future and kisses Cassie goodbye. He leaves behind his armor, which has activated Vision's operating software and becomes a sentient being called Jonas.

Cassie and Jonas remain attracted to one another, initially due to Nate's mental imprint. While fighting the Cosmic Cube-altered Absorbing Man, Jonas is affected by the Cube's radiation and splits into Iron Lad (Nate) and the original Vision. Iron Lad appears to maintain the memories of the events prior to going back in time. After the Absorbing Man is defeated, the original Vision and Iron Lad reunite.

Iron Lad appears in the series Avengers: The Children's Crusade, in which he prevents Wolverine from killing an amnesiac and de-powered Wanda Maximoff. Soon thereafter, Cassie's deceased father Scott Lang is plucked from the past and saved, but Cassie is killed. Iron Lad insists on traveling back to the past to save her, and he kills Jonas when he protests. When the Young Avengers tell Iron Lad that this is most likely the event that will lead him down the path to becoming Kang the Conqueror, he states that "I will be better than Kang the Conqueror", and disappears.

In the series Marvel's Voices, Iron Lad is attacked by Kristoff Vernard, who sieges Chronopolis. Unable to stop Vernard, Iron Lad takes a shard of the M'Kraan Crystal and sends it away, hoping that it can find someone to help. Iron Lad is mortally wounded by Vernard and ends up on Earth-616, where he encounters Cassie Lang and the main universe version of Vernard. Vernard and Cassie manage to kill the alternate Vernard, but Iron Lad dies from his injuries.

In the series Avengers Academy: Marvel's Voices, it is revealed that Iron Lad was saved from death by M'Kraan, the embodiment of the M'Kraan Crystal. Now known as Immortus, he oversees the Midnight Chapel, M'Kraan's home.

== Powers and abilities ==
Nate's Iron Lad armor is composed of neuro-kinetic nano-metal and he can alter its appearance and shape with his thoughts. The armor grants Iron Lad superhuman strength and allows him to fly. It also enables him to fire blasts of various kinds of energy, hack into computer systems, create magnetic fields and travel through time. Kang's psychic link with his armor enables him to mentally control it from a close range.

== Other versions ==
=== Exiles ===
In Exiles vol. 3, an alternate version of Nate who embraced his role as Kang, dubbed the Iron Prince, appears as a member of the Dark Exiles.

=== Ultimate Universe ===
An original incarnation of Iron Lad, Tony Stark, appears in the Ultimate Universe imprint.

=== What If ===
An original incarnation of Iron Lad, Victor Mancha, appears in What If?. Having never learned about Vision's failsafe, he instead recruits the Runaways as his allies.

== In other media ==
Iron Lad appears as an unlockable playable character in Marvel Avengers Academy, voiced by Billy Kametz.
