= Avengers Forever =

Marvel comic book series, 1998–2023

- Cover to Avengers Forever trade paperback (2000). Art by Carlos Pacheco

Publication information
- Publisher: Marvel Comics
- Schedule: Monthly
- Format: Limited series
- Genre: Superhero
- Publication date: May 1998 – November 2023
- No. of issues: (vol. 1): 12 (vol. 2): 15
- Main character(s): Captain America; Yellowjacket; Giant-Man; Wasp; Hawkeye; Songbird; Captain Marvel; Rick Jones; Kang the Conqueror; Immortus

Creative team
- Written by: (vol. 1): Kurt Busiek; Roger Stern (vol. 2): Jason Aaron
- Penciller: Carlos Pacheco
- Inker: Jesus Merino
- Colorist(s): Steve Oliff; Graphic Colorworks
- Editor(s): Ben Abernathy; Tom Brevoort

Collected editions
- Hardcover: ISBN 0-7851-3796-3
- Softcover: ISBN 0-7851-0756-8

Avengers Forever is a twelve-issue comic book limited series published from December 1998 to November 1999 by Marvel Comics. It follows the storyline of Rick Jones and his quest to build a team of Avengers from the past, present, and future. The series was written by Kurt Busiek and Roger Stern and drawn by Carlos Pacheco and Jesus Merino. In 2021, a new Avengers Forever series was released, following the character Ghost Rider.

== Publication history ==
Marvel originally contracted Busiek and Pacheco to produce a series called Avengers: World in Chains, but it was too similar to another project (presumably Mutant X) and was canceled by the company. Because Busiek and Pacheco were under contract, the pair instead developed the concept for Avengers Forever.

== Plot summary ==
Immortus sends his servant Tempus to kill an apparently critically ill Rick Jones, the possessor of the "Destiny Force", a powerful ability used during the Kree–Skrull War storyline.

Rick is saved by Kang the Conqueror (who is destined to evolve into Immortus), who destroys Tempus and holds off Immortus' temporal army. The Supreme Intelligence urges Rick to use the Destiny Force to summon aid. With the help of former Zodiac member Libra, Rick pulls various members of the superhero team Avengers from the past, present, and future. The team consists of a disillusioned Captain America, who is pulled from an adventure in which he discovers a high-ranking government official is the leader of the Secret Empire; Yellowjacket from a time when he is mentally unbalanced and unaware that he is Hank Pym; Hawkeye from just after the conclusion of the Kree–Skrull War and war against Olympus; Giant-Man (also Hank Pym) and Wasp from the present; Songbird from an unspecified time in the near future; and Captain Marvel from further in the future.

Although these Avengers appear to have been randomly selected, Libra states that they have been chosen due to his subtle awareness of the universal balance, each one fulfilling an eventually clarified role in events:

- Captain America's presence brought cohesion to the team while his weakened mental state due to his current lack of confidence prevented him from dominating it;
- Wasp led the team with strength and flexibility that gave them direction without exerting too much control;
- Yellowjacket's eventual betrayal of the team due to his current instability would bring them into the right position to strike;
- Giant-Man provided support while irritating and provoking Yellowjacket;
- Hawkeye's presence affected both Yellowjacket's and Libra's responses to the crisis;
- Songbird's skewed connections to Hawkeye, the Wasp, and Captain Marvel in the past, present, and future affected Captain Marvel's own decisions regarding Rick Jones's fate.

During their efforts to protect Rick, the Avengers battle Immortus across several different eras, including encounters in the American Old West with the Two-Gun Kid, the Night Rider, the Ringo Kid, the Rawhide Kid, Kid Colt, and the Gunhawks, as well as an alternate version of the Avengers from the 1950s, and a confrontation to thwart an alien invasion in a possible future. During their searches, they discover that Immortus possesses the Forever Crystal, an artifact that can control multiple realities. Kang aids the Avengers as part of his 'rebellion' against his apparent destiny, and reveals that Immortus serves a trio of entities called the Time Keepers, with his previous interactions with the team having been motivated by an effort to keep humanity limited to prevent them from developing into a threat to the universe. These entities eventually reveal that, in various futures, mankind will travel into space and establish the warlike Terran Empire, an interstellar dictatorship policed by the Galactic Avengers Battalion and ruled by humans with access to the Destiny Force, which will thrive at the cost of many alien cultures. A future version of the Avengers will apparently be at the forefront of the expansion, but the Avengers reject the idea that mankind must be destroyed or contained to prevent these futures' happening, with Captain America and Songbird arguing that humanity deserves a chance to show that it can be better rather than being condemned for things that have not happened yet.

Kang aids the Avengers and, in the final battle, kills the Time Keepers when they attempt to punish Immortus for failing. The Avengers resolve to strike against the Time Keepers even after they learn their enemies' motives, arguing that the Time Keepers only seek to eliminate those that might threaten them, when they do not even attempt to erase themselves, despite the existence of alternate timelines where they themselves became the Time Twisters. During a mass conflict where the Time-Keepers unleash the Avengers of the corrupted timelines against an army of Avengers drawn from the worlds where they remained true to their original purpose, the Time Keepers attempt to force Kang to become Immortus after they kill the future Immortus for his attempt to protect the Avengers. However, Kang's strength of will and the unique temporal conditions of the conflict result in a temporal backlash, culminating in Kang and Immortus being recreated as separate beings. When Rick is injured using the Destiny Force to destroy the Time-Keepers' equipment, Captain Marvel merges with Rick to save his life—the link with Marvel's future self resulting in Rick being unintentionally linked to Marvel's present self when he, Giant-Man, and the Wasp return to their present—and all the Avengers are returned to their respective timelines with a lingering memory of the incident.

=== Aftermath ===
While Genis-Vell is revealed to have come from a few months in the future, with the greater age of Rick's future self revealed to be the result of accelerated aging while helping Thanos separate Death from Marlo Chandler, it is generally accepted that the Songbird who fought with the Avengers in this storyline originated from an alternate future rather than the future.

== Collected editions ==
The series has been collected into a single volume:

- Avengers Forever (softcover, Avengers Legends: Volume 1, 264 pages, January 2001, ISBN 0-7851-0756-8, hardcover, 296 pages, September 2009, ISBN 0-7851-3796-3)

== 2021 series ==
In 2021, a new Avengers: Forever series was released. It details Ghost Rider and one of the Deathloks working for the mysterious Avenger Prime traveling across the Multiverse to put together an army of Multiversal Avengers in order to combat the Multiversal Masters of Evil who have either conquered other Earths.
