= Avengers (comics) =

Marvel Comics superhero team

- Cover of The Avengers (vol. 3) #38 (March 2001). Depicting (left-to-right): Hulk, Iron Man, Wasp, Thor, Vision, Captain America, Wonder Man, Hank Pym (as Goliath), Scarlet Witch, Carol Danvers (as Warbird), Quicksilver, and Delroy Garrett (as Triathlon). Art by Alan Davis.

Publication information
- Publisher: Marvel Comics
- First appearance: The Avengers #1 (September 1963)
- Created by: Stan Lee (writer/editor); Jack Kirby (artist/co-plotter)

In-story information
- Base(s): Impossible City; Jarvis Lounge (formerly); Avengers Mountain/The Progenitor (a dead Celestial) (formerly); Avengers Mansion (formerly); Hydro-Base (formerly); Avengers Tower (formerly)
- Member(s): Captain Marvel; Daredevil; Luke Cage; Miracleman; Spider-Man (Leader); Wolverine

Roster

The Avengers are a superhero team appearing in American comic books published by Marvel Comics, created by writer-editor Stan Lee and artist/co-plotter Jack Kirby. The team made its debut in The Avengers #1 (cover-dated September 1963). Labeled "Earth's Mightiest Heroes", the original Avengers consisted of Iron Man, Ant-Man, Hulk, Thor, and Wasp. Captain America was discovered trapped in ice in issue #4, and joined the group after they revived him. The Avengers are an all-star ensemble cast of established superhero characters from the Marvel Comics portfolio.

Diegetically, these superheroes usually operate independently but occasionally assemble as a team to tackle especially formidable villains. This in contrast to certain other superhero teams such as the X-Men, whose characters were created specifically to be part of their team, with the team being central to their identity.

The cast usually features a few highly popular characters who have their own solo books, such as Iron Man, alongside a number of lesser-known characters who benefit from exposure, such as Quicksilver, Wonder Man, and Tigra.

The Avengers have appeared in a wide variety of media outside of comic books, including several different animated television series and direct-to-video films. Beginning in 2008, the group were adapted in a film series from Marvel Studios, known as the Marvel Cinematic Universe, culminating with The Avengers in 2012 and continued in subsequent films.

== Publication history ==
=== 1960s ===
The debut of the original Avengers: The Avengers#1 (Sept. 1963). Cover art by Jack Kirby and Dick Ayers The five founding members were: Iron Man, Thor, Ant-Man, The Wasp, and The Hulk.

The team debuted in The Avengers #1 (September 1963). Much like the Justice League of DC Comics, the original line-up of the Avengers consisted of heroes who each had existing series of their own. All of the characters were created by Stan Lee and Jack Kirby. This initial series, published bi-monthly through issue #6 (July 1964) and monthly thereafter, ran through issue #402 (Sept. 1996). As set out in the first issue, when the Asgardian god Loki seeks revenge against his brother Thor, his machinations unwittingly lead the Hulk's friend, the teenager Rick Jones, to collect Ant-Man, the Wasp, and Iron Man to help Thor and the Hulk, the latter of whom Loki used as a pawn. After the group vanquished Loki, Ant-Man stated that the five worked well together and suggested they form a team; the Wasp named the group Avengers.

The roster changed almost immediately; in the second issue (November 1963), Ant-Man assumed the new name and identity of Giant-Man, and at the end of the issue, the Hulk left once he realized how much the others feared his unstable personality. Captain America joined the team in issue #4 (March 1964), and he was later given the status of "founding member." The Hulk, upset about being replaced by Captain America and the apparent betrayal by Rick, sought revenge against the Avengers, who teamed up with the Fantastic Four to stop him in The Fantastic Four #26 (May 1964). The Avengers went on to fight foes such as Baron Zemo, who formed the Masters of Evil, Kang the Conqueror first appeared in issue #8; Kirby left the series following this issue, replaced by Don Heck. Wonder Man and Count Nefaria appeared as antagonists subsequently. In issue #16 (May 1965), every member but Captain America resigned. They were replaced by three former villains: Hawkeye, Scarlet Witch and her brother Quicksilver. This version of the group became known as "Cap's Kooky Quartet." In issue #28, Giant-Man, now calling himself Goliath, and the Wasp rejoined.

In 1966, Roy Thomas replaced Lee as the writer of the series. Under Thomas's tenure, Hercules became part of the team, while the Black Knight and Black Widow abetted the Avengers but did not become members until years later. Spider-Man was offered membership but did not join the group. John Buscema replaced Heck as the main artist for the series with issue #41 (June 1967). The Black Panther joined in issue #52 (May 1968), after rescuing the team from the Grim Reaper and Klaw. The X-Men #45 (June 1968) featured a crossover with The Avengers #53 (June 1968). This was followed by the introduction of the android Vision, in issue #57 (October 1968). Pym assumed the new identity of Yellowjacket in issue #59, and married the Wasp the following month.

The Avengers headquarters was in a New York City building called Avengers Mansion, courtesy of Tony Stark (Iron Man's real identity). The mansion was serviced by Edwin Jarvis, the Avengers' butler, and furnished with state of the art technology and defense systems, and included the Avengers' primary mode of transport: the five-engine Quinjet.

=== 1970s ===
The team encountered new characters such as Arkon in issue #75 (April 1970) and Red Wolf in #80 (Sept. 1970). The team's adventures increased in scope as the team crossed into an alternate dimension and battled the Squadron Supreme. In a nine-part storyline, beginning in issue #89 (June 1971), the group fought in the Kree–Skrull War, an epic battle between the alien Kree and Skrull races guest-starring the Kree hero, Captain Marvel. The Avengers briefly disbanded when Skrulls impersonating Captain America, Thor, and Iron Man used their authority as founders of the team and disbanded it. The true founding Avengers, minus the Wasp, reformed the team in response after complaints from Jarvis.

Mantis joined the team along with the reformed Swordsman. "The Avengers-Defenders Clash" storyline crossed over with issues of another Marvel superhero team, The Defenders. "The Celestial Madonna" arc linked Mantis' origins to the very beginnings of the Kree-Skrull conflict in a time-spanning adventure involving Kang the Conqueror and Immortus, who were past and future versions of each other. Mantis was revealed to be the Celestial Madonna, destined to give birth to a being that would save the universe. It was revealed that the Vision's body had only been appropriated, and not created by Ultron, and that it had belonged to the original Human Torch, who had been an android created by Professor Horton. With his origins clear to him and a new feeling of rootedness, the Vision proposed to the Scarlet Witch. The "Celestial Madonna" saga ended with their wedding, presided over by Immortus. Beast and Moondragon joined the team soon after. A seven-part story featured the Squadron Supreme and the Serpent Crown.

The series spawned spinoffs including several annuals and miniseries, and a giant-size quarterly sister series that ran briefly in the mid-1970s. Writers of the first series included Stan Lee, Roy Thomas, Steve Englehart, Gerry Conway, Jim Shooter, David Michelinie, and Roger Stern. Artists included Jack Kirby, Don Heck, John Buscema, George Tuska, Gene Colan, Barry Smith, Tom Palmer, Neal Adams, Bob Brown, Dave Cockrum, Sal Buscema, George Perez, John Byrne and Steve Epting.

Other classic storylines included "The Bride of Ultron", the "Nefaria Trilogy", and "The Korvac Saga", which featured nearly every Avenger who joined the team up to that point. Henry Peter Gyrich became the Avengers' liaison to the United States National Security Council. Gyrich was prejudiced against superhumans and acted in a heavy-handed, obstructive manner, and insisted that the Avengers follow government rules and regulations or else lose their priority status with the government. Among Gyrich's demands was that the active roster be trimmed down to only seven members, and that the Falcon, an African American, be admitted to the team to comply with affirmative action laws. Hawkeye lost his membership slot to the Falcon because of the seven-member limit, which he resented. The Falcon, in turn, was unhappy to be the beneficiary of what he perceived to be tokenism, and decided to resign from the team, after which Wonder Man rejoined. The true origins of Quicksilver and the Scarlet Witch were revealed in a three-part story that ran in issues #185–187 (July–Sept. 1979). After this adventure, the Scarlet Witch took a leave of absence and Ms. Marvel officially joined the team as her replacement.

=== 1980s ===
The first major development in this decade was the mental breakdown of Hank Pym, with his frequent changes of costume and name being symptomatic of an identity problem and an inferiority complex. After he abused his wife, failed to win back the confidence of the Avengers with a ruse and was duped by the villain Egghead, Pym was jailed. Pym would later outwit Egghead and defeated the latest incarnation of the Masters of Evil single-handedly, and proved his innocence. Pym reconciled with the Wasp, but they decided to remain apart. He retired from super-heroics, not returning until years later.

This was followed by several major storylines, such as "Ultimate Vision" in which the Vision took over the world's computer systems in a misguided attempt to create world peace; the formation of the West Coast Avengers; and "Avengers Under Siege" which involved the second Baron Zemo and the Masters of Evil taking over the mansion and severely injuring Jarvis and Hercules. "Assault on Olympus" featured Hercules' father, Zeus, blaming the Avengers for his son's injuries and bringing them to Olympus for trial, and the "Heavy Metal" arc saw the Super-Adaptoid organize several robotic villains for an assault on the team. New members during the 1980s included Tigra; the She-Hulk; Monica Rambeau (then going by the name Captain Marvel); Starfox (the brother of Thanos); Hawkeye's wife, Mockingbird; and Namor the Sub-Mariner. Hank Pym emerged from retirement to join the West Coast Avengers. Spider-Man was again offered membership, but failed to gain admission due to security concerns by the Avengers' government liaison.

The villain Nebula falsely claimed to be the granddaughter of Thanos. The team relocated for a period to a floating island off the coast of New York called Hydrobase after Avengers Mansion was severely damaged during the events in "Under Siege". Hydrobase was later sunk during the Acts of Vengeance crossover.

The Avengers and West Coast Avengers changed to allow members to be active when available and reserved when not available and merged the two separate Avengers teams into one team with two bases. The Vision had his personality fundamentally altered, along with the discovery that the children of the Scarlet Witch and the Vision were actually illusions. The loss of the Scarlet Witch's children and the Vision, who was disassembled by government agents in retaliation for the Ultimate Vision storyline, drove her insane, although she eventually recovered and rejoined the team. This story revealed that the Scarlet Witch's powers included wide-range reality manipulation and she was what the time-traveling Immortus refers to as a "nexus being" setting the stage for 2004's eventual Chaos and Avengers Disassembled storylines. This played out in the Darker than Scarlet storyline which ran in Avengers West Coast from issues #51–62 (Nov. 1989–Sept. 1990). The Avengers titles in late 1989 were involved in the major crossover event "Acts of Vengeance" where Loki assembled many of Marvel's arch-villains, his inner circle consisted of Doctor Doom, Magneto, Kingpin, Mandarin, Wizard, and Red Skull, in a plot to destroy the team. Loki orchestrated a mass breakout of villains from prison facility, the Vault, as part of his "Acts of Vengeance" scheme, but he ultimately failed in his goal to destroy the Avengers.

Spin-off series include West Coast Avengers, initially published as a four-issue miniseries in 1984, followed by a 102-issue series (Oct. 1985–Jan. 1994), retitled Avengers West Coast with #47; and the 40-issue Solo Avengers (Dec.1987–Jan. 1991), retitled Avengers Spotlight with #21.

=== 1990s ===
The U.S. government revoked the Avengers' New York State charter in a treaty with the Soviet Union. The Avengers then received a charter from the United Nations and the Avengers split into two teams again with a substitute reserve team backing up the main teams.

At this point, ongoing storylines and character development focused on the Black Knight, Sersi, Crystal, Hercules, Vision, and Black Widow. Their primary antagonists in this run were the mysterious Proctor and his team of other-dimensional Avengers known as the Gatherers. During this period, the Avengers found themselves facing increasingly murderous enemies and were forced to question their rule against killing.

This culminated in "Operation: Galactic Storm", a 19-part storyline that ran through all Avengers-related titles and showcased a conflict between the Kree and the Shi'ar Empire. The team split when Iron Man and several dissidents executed the Supreme Intelligence against the wishes of Captain America. After a vote disbanded the West Coast Avengers, Iron Man formed a proactive and aggressive team called Force Works. During the team's first mission, Wonder Man was killed again, though his atoms were temporarily scattered. Force Works later disbanded after it was revealed that Iron Man became a murderer via the manipulations of the villain Kang, the same storyline seeing Iron Man sacrificing himself and being replaced by his teenage counterpart from a parallel timeline.

The controversial "Heroes Reborn" event was developed by Rob Liefeld and Jim Lee, star artists of the time. In the story, many of the Avengers, together with the Fantastic Four and others, died trying to stop the psychic entity Onslaught, although it was revealed that Franklin Richards preserved those heroes in a pocket universe. Believing the main team to be gone, the Black Widow disbanded the Avengers, and only butler Edwin Jarvis remained to tend to the Mansion.

The previous continuity of the Marvel Universe was set aside as the heroes were "reborn" in the pocket universe created by Franklin Richards to save his parents and their friends, while the "Heroes Reborn" line ended and the heroes returned to the prime Marvel Universe. This restoration also undid recent changes to the team members such as the Wasp being mutated into an insectoid form, Hawkeye being rendered deaf, and Stark being replaced by his teenage self, attributed to Franklin's childish perception recreating the heroes in the manner he was more familiar with.

After the Heroes Reborn series concluded, the Avengers comic was restarted with vol. 3 #1 written by Kurt Busiek and pencilled by George Pérez. New members during this run included the revived Wonder Man, Justice, Firestar, Silverclaw, and Triathlon. The Avengers fought many of their traditional villains such as the Grim Reaper, Ultron, Count Nefaria, and Kang the Conqueror. The limited series Avengers Forever, starting during this period, was a time travel story that explored the history of the Avengers and resolved many outstanding questions about Kang and Immortus's past manipulations of the team, featuring various Avengers from the past (Captain America immediately after "Secret Empire", Hank Pym early in his Yellowjacket delusion, and Hawkeye just after the Kree-Skrull war), present (Hank Pym as Giant-Man and Janet as the Wasp) and possible futures (Genis-Vell and Songbird) working alongside Kang the Conqueror and Rick Jones as part of Kang's attempt to escape his perceived 'destiny' as Immortus.

The prequel comic Avengers #1 1/2 (Dec. 1999), by writer Roger Stern and artist Bruce Timm, told a retro-style story taking place between issues #1 and #2, detailing Ant-Man's decision to transform himself into Giant-Man. Between 1996 and 2004, Marvel relaunched the primary Avengers title three times. In 1996, the "Heroes Reborn" line took place in an alternate universe, with a revamped history unrelated to mainstream Marvel continuity.

The Avengers vol. 3 ran for 84 issues from February 1998 to August 2004. Early issues were written by Kurt Busiek and penciled by George Perez. To coincide with what would have been the 500th issue of the original series, Marvel changed the numbering, and The Avengers #500–503 (Sept.– Dec. 2004), the one-shot Avengers Finale (Jan. 2005) became the "Avengers Disassembled" storyline and final issues. In January 2005, a new version of the team appeared in the ongoing title New Avengers, followed by The Mighty Avengers, Avengers: The Initiative, and Dark Avengers. Avengers vol. 4 debuted in July 2010 and ran until January 2013. Vol. 5 was launched in February 2013. After Secret Wars, a new Avengers team debuted, dubbed the All-New, All-Different Avengers, starting with a Free Comic Book Day preview. Following Civil War II, the book was relaunched in 2016 as Avengers, while retaining the same writer and much of the cast from the All-New, All-Different run. The series ran for 11 issues before reverting to the numbering of the original Avengers series with issue #672. Starting with issue #675, all four Avengers titles being published at the time (Avengers, Uncanny Avengers, U.S. Avengers and Occupy Avengers) were merged into a single weekly series dubbed Avengers: No Surrender, lasting 16 issues, designed to close out this era of the team's history.

Following the conclusion of No Surrender in 2018, the series was relaunched again as Avengers.

=== 2000s ===
The Avengers were granted international authority by the United Nations. Members joining during that period included Jack of Hearts and the second Ant-Man. A new Captain Britain was added to the team. The "Avengers Disassembled" storyline followed. Titled Chaos, the story featured the deaths of some members and a loss of credibility for the team. The culprit is revealed to be the Scarlet Witch, who had gone insane after agonizing over the memory of her lost children and who subsequently lost control of her reality-altering powers. With the team in disarray and Avengers Mansion ruined, the surviving members agreed to disband.

A new Avengers team formed, in the series New Avengers. The new team begins when a group of heroes band together to thwart a break-out at super-villain prison the Raft, composed of Iron Man, Captain America, Luke Cage, Wolverine, Ronin, Spider-Man, Spider-Woman, and the mysterious Sentry. This was soon followed by the House of M event.

In the company-wide "Civil War" story arc, Marvel superheroes were split over compliance with the U.S. government's new Superhuman Registration Act, which required all superpowered persons to register their true identities with the federal government and become agents of same. The New Avengers disbanded, with a rebel underground starring in a series retaining The New Avengers in its trademarked cover logo and New Avengers in its copyright indicia. Luke Cage led this team, consisting of himself, Echo, Ronin, Spider-Man, Spider-Woman, Wolverine, Iron Fist, and Doctor Strange. During the long-term Secret Invasion by the shape-shifting alien race the Skrulls, it was revealed that Spider-Woman had been abducted and replaced by the Skrull queen Veranke before she even joined the team. After the Skrulls' defeat, Spider-Woman was rescued along with other abducted and replaced heroes. During the company-wide story arc "Dark Reign", Echo and Iron Fist left the team and the Avengers gained Ms. Marvel, Bucky Barnes as a fill-in Captain America, and Mockingbird.

Iron Man, in the series The Mighty Avengers, formed a team under the aegis of the government's Fifty State Initiative program, and took up residency in New York City, joined by Ares, Black Widow, Sentry, Wasp, Wonder Man, and leader Carol Danvers as Ms. Marvel. After the events of the Secret Invasion story arc, Norman Osborn assumed control of the formerly S.H.I.E.L.D.-sponsored Avengers, now under the auspices of his own agency, H.A.M.M.E.R. All but Ares and Sentry left this team — the Wasp appeared to have died — and the team migrated to the series Dark Avengers. Osborn recruited Marvel Boy to pose as Captain Marvel and Daken to pose as his father, Wolverine, bringing Moonstone, Bullseye, and Venom from his previous Thunderbolts team to impersonate Ms. Marvel, Hawkeye, and Spider-Man respectively.

In The Mighty Avengers, Pym, assumed the Wasp identity in tribute to his fallen ex-wife, led a new team of Avengers, and claimed the name for his team as he was the only founding Avenger on any of the three active Avengers rosters (Wasp and Cap were dead, Thor was acting solo, and Iron Man was on the run from Osborn). His team operated under a multinational umbrella group, the Global Reaction Agency for Mysterious Paranormal Activity (GRAMPA). This team featured the roster of Hercules, Amadeus Cho, Stature, Vision, Jocasta, U.S. Agent, Quicksilver, Magneto, and Pym. Loki in disguise as the Scarlet Witch was a recurring character. Iron Man and the Hulk were briefly with them.

=== 2010s ===
After Osborn's Dark Avengers are exposed as criminals and their attack on Asgard was thwarted, the next iteration of the Avengers roster consists of Thor, Hawkeye, Spider-Man, Wolverine, Captain America, Spider-Woman, Iron Man, and team leader Maria Hill. Steve Rogers, briefly eschewing his Captain America persona, responds to Luke Cage's concerns about the team reverting to old methods by granting Cage's "New Avengers" recognition as an official team independent of Stark's more traditional Avengers. Bucky Barnes as Captain America joined the main Avengers, while Iron Fist, Power Woman, and the Thing joined Cage's team, Spider-Man and Wolverine maintaining dual membership in both teams. Rogers was an occasional presence and Victoria Hand was added as a government liaison for the New Avengers with Rogers's backing.

A second series, titled Secret Avengers, was released in May 2010, written by Ed Brubaker with Mike Deodato as the regular artist. The second volume of the New Avengers series was launched in June 2010, written by Bendis and drawn by Stuart Immonen. A fourth title, Avengers Academy, was launched in June 2010, replacing Avengers: The Initiative. Christos Gage served as writer, with Mike McKone as artist.

Following a meeting between Rogers and MI-13, Captain Britain accepts a position with the Avengers. Noh-Varr later does as well. Bruce Banner made arrangements with Rogers for the Red Hulk to join.

The "Shattered Heroes" storyline leads to several changes in the main Avengers lineup, with Quake and Storm being recruited, and the Vision rejoining the team. Wolverine and Spider-Man leave the main team and become more involved with the New Avengers. During the events of the "Avengers vs. X-Men" storyline, Storm quits to side with her fellow mutants as a member of the X-Men. The Avengers dismiss Noh-Varr after he attempted to betray the team, though ultimately he did not. The conflict ends with both teams united but defeated by an unrepentant Cyclops. A new series, Uncanny Avengers, debuted in the flagship title of the Marvel NOW! initiative. The title is written by Rick Remender with art by John Cassaday, and the team contains members of both the Avengers and the X-Men. As well, a biweekly Avengers title was launched, written by Jonathan Hickman and drawn by different artists for each story arc. Hickman also began writing New Avengers. During the 2014 "AXIS" storyline, when a now-evil Scarlet Witch invades Latveria, Doctor Doom forms his own team of Avengers consisting of 3D Man, Elsa Bloodstone, Stingray, Valkyrie, and U.S. Agent. After various heroes and villains experience a moral inversion in the battle against the Red Skull empowered with Professor X's abilities, Rogers later assembles Magneto, Doom, Absorbing Man, Carnage, Deadpool, Enchantress, Hobgoblin, Jack O'Lantern, Loki, Mystique, and Sabretooth, all temporarily 'inverted' to act as heroes, to assist him and Spider-Man in defeating the inverted Avengers and X-Men until the original spell can be undone. During the "Time Runs Out" storyline, Sunspot created a team of the Avengers, consisting of himself, Black Widow, Cannonball, Manifold, Pod, Shang-Chi, Smasher, Spider-Woman, Validator, and the Children of the Sun. The "Multiversal Avengers" division of this team consists of Abyss, the Ex Nihili (including Ex Nihilo), Hyperion, Nightmask, Odinson, and Star Brand.

Following the destruction and reconstruction of reality in the 2015 "Secret Wars" storyline, a new team is created known as Avengers Idea Mechanics, set to tackle Avengers-level threats beyond simply fighting villains, while the Avengers Unity Squad continues to operate to support mutant relations. Iron Man forms a new team of Avengers in the All-New All-Different Avengers series consisting of himself, the Vision, Nova, Ms. Marvel (Kamala Khan), Spider-Man (Miles Morales), Captain America (Sam Wilson), and Thor (Jane Foster). Following the "Civil War II", storyline, the title was canceled and replaced with a new volume of the regular Avengers title. The roster was also changed, where following Iron Man being placed in a coma, and Spider-Man, Nova, and Ms. Marvel's resignation from the team (who instead teamed up with other heroes their own age to form their own group the Champions), the remaining three members are joined by Spider-Man (Peter Parker), Hercules and Wasp (Nadia Pym) to form a new team.

During the 2017 "Secret Empire" storyline, when Captain America was 'reprogrammed' to believe that he had been a Hydra sleeper agent since childhood, the Hydra regime formed their own Avengers. This team consisted of Odinson (Thor currently doubting his worth and believing that Rogers must be 'right' as he could wield Mjolnir when Thor could not, unaware that Hydra had used the cosmic cube to change the nature of the enchantment), Deadpool, a Chthon-possessed Scarlet Witch, Vision (who was suffering from an A.I. virus created by Arnim Zola), Taskmaster, Eric O'Grady's Life Model Decoy counterpart Black Ant, and Superior Octopus. However, in the final stand, Odinson rejects Rogers' authority and sides with his old allies, while the Vision's daughter purges him of the virus and Brother Voodoo exorcises Chthon from the Witch. Taskmaster and Black Ant free the imprisoned Champions in exchange for leniency, and the true version of Steve Rogers was restored, using Mjolnir against his counterpart.

In May 2018, another volume for the series was launched as part of Marvel's Fresh Start initiative, written by Jason Aaron and drawn by Ed McGuinness. This new volume also saw the return of the main three core members, as Steve Rogers and Thor met up with Tony Stark to convince him to reassemble the group with themselves at its core. The reunion was consolidated by the machinations of Loki, who facilitated the arrival of the world-threatening Dark Celestials as a ploy to get the Avengers back in action, resulting in the participation of Black Panther, Captain Marvel, She-Hulk, Ghost Rider and Blade, with the Black Panther being elected chairperson. After the Dark Celestials were defeated, the Celestials set upright the corpse of the long-time dead Progenitor in the North Pole. The Avengers refurbish the Progenitor's corpse, transforming it into their base of operations, the Avengers Mountain.

=== 2020s ===
The next Avengers line-up consisted of Black Panther, Captain Marvel, Captain America (Sam Wilson), Iron Man, Vision, and Scarlet Witch. One of their missions took them to a multiverse-traversing location called Impossible City which was previously used for a group of superheroes before they abandoned it. The Avengers fought the Ashen Combine who had escaped from their prison in the Impossible City and have taken over it in their plot to invade the multiverse and kill some of its inhabitants. After the Avengers learned about the Ashen Combine, used the explosives on Citysmith's invasive structures, and defeated and imprisoned the Ashen Combine, it was this act of heroics that caused Impossible City to ask the Avengers if it can join them. They accepted and have used Impossible City as their orbiting base.

In June 2026, it was announced that following the conclusion of the Avengers: Armageddon event, the series would be relaunched in November that same year. Written by Chip Zdarsky and illustrated by Marco Chechetto, the series follows the new line-up of Spider-Man, Wolverine, Captain Marvel, Daredevil, Luke Cage, and David Colton/Miracleman.

== Team roster ==
The Avengers team lineup has been fluid and changing, with many members coming and going, often more than once. The founding members of the team were Iron Man, Thor, Hulk, Ant-Man and the Wasp. Hulk left the team in the second issue, although he would continue to play a part in the stories for several issues thereafter; this would become a running gag among splinter team members (for example, Spider-Man leaving the second incarnation of the Avengers Unity Division). He was soon replaced by Captain America. Later additions and frequent members include Hawkeye, Wonder Man, Falcon, Black Panther, Captain Marvel, Scarlet Witch, Quicksilver, and Vision, among others.

=== Splinter teams ===
There are also numerous splinter teams that have formed, starting with the West Coast Avengers in 1984. Each of these splinter teams tends to specialize in a way the main team does not. Members of these teams can be on other splinter teams or on the main team. Of these teams, only the main team, Avengers World, the Great Lakes Avengers, the Savage Avengers, and the Young Avengers are currently active. Additionally, all members of the Fantastic Four, as well as various members of the X-Men, Heroes for Hire, and other prominent Marvel teams have served as members of the Avengers.

==== A-Force ====
An all-female team formed after the Secret Wars event.

==== Avengers A.I. ====
A team consisting of people with various artificial intelligence-related abilities.

==== Avengers Academy ====
A school for teenage superheroes who served as Avengers members and received training from full-time Avengers members. The school was shut down shortly after the events of Avengers Arena, but later reopened.

==== Avengers Emergency Response Squad ====
A rapid-response team sent to deal with growing global crises when the main Avengers team is preoccupied or incapacitated.

==== Avengers Unity Division ====
A team meant to bridge the gap between humans, mutates, and mutants following Avengers vs. X-Men by including members of all groups. Their mission statement was later expanded to include Inhumans.

==== Avengers World ====
A team that specializes in international protection following the disbandment of the U.S.Avengers. Not to be confused with the comic book of the same name.

==== Dark Avengers ====
A team made up of supervillains-turned-antiheroes.

==== Great Lakes Avengers ====
A farcical team consisting of low-level heroes living in Wisconsin.

==== Mighty Avengers ====
There are three incarnations of the Mighty Avengers:

- A team formed by Iron Man as part of the Fifty-States Initiative, which was broken apart after the events of Secret Invasion.
- A team formed by Hank Pym after the previous Mighty Avengers collapsed.
- A team formed by Luke Cage to deal with more street-level threats in response to the latest invasion by Thanos. It was shut down by Iron Man during the AXIS event.

==== New Avengers ====
There are four incarnations of the New Avengers:

- A team created after the disbandment of the main team to replace them. This team was known for including more prestigious Marvel superheroes, such as Spider-Man, Wolverine, and Daredevil, and disbanded after the retirement of its leader, Luke Cage.
- A team formed by Sunspot after he purchased and reformed Advanced Idea Mechanics.
- A similar team to Sunspot's, going by the name "Avengers Idea Mechanics".
- A team led by Black Widow to oppose the Killuminati.

==== Savage Avengers ====
A team consisting of supernatural or antiheroic members.

==== Secret Avengers ====
There are two incarnations of the Secret Avengers:

- A black operation team formed by Steve Rogers.
- Another undercover team formed by S.H.I.E.L.D.

==== U.S.Avengers ====
A patriotic-themed team.

==== War Avengers ====
A temporary team formed during "The War of the Realms" event.

==== West Coast Avengers ====
A team formed by Vision to expand the Avengers' reach to the Western coast of the United States.

==== Young Avengers ====
A team consisting of teenage and young adult heroes.

== Enemies ==
The Avengers have a long list of villains they frequently face. Some of the most recurring include Ultron, Kang the Conqueror, Doctor Doom, Loki, and Thanos.

== Cultural impact and legacy ==
=== Critical response ===
Abraham Josephine Riesman of Vulture included the Avengers team in their "12 Teams That Defined Superhero Storytelling" list. Michael Doran of Newsarama ranked the Avengers team 1st in their "Best Superhero Teams of All Time" list. Comic Book Resources asserted, "The Avengers are known as Earth's mightiest heroes, and that appellation is self-explanatory. The team combines Marvel's greatest heroes into one powerful unit, an assemblage of heroes that faces down the deadliest threats the Marvel Universe can throw at them. The team has proven to be one of the most potent groups in all of comics, boasting legendary heroes and battling in titanic wars for the fate of all reality," and ranked the Avengers team 1st in their "10 Most Important Marvel Hero Teams" list, 1st in their "Every Marvel Superhero Team" list, 1st in their "Marvel: The 10 Strongest Superhero Teams" list, and 2nd in their "Marvel: 10 Most Powerful Teams" list.

Poushali Guharauth of Sportskeeda ranked the Avengers 1st in their "10 Best Superhero Teams of All Time" list. Jason Serafino of Complex ranked the Avengers 2nd in their "10 Best Superhero Teams In Comics" list. Chris Isaac of Screen Rant the Avengers team 2nd in their "15 Best Superhero Teams Of All Time" list. Geoff Boucher of Deadline ranked the Avengers team 3rd in their "Stan Lee's Legacy: Ranking The Hollywood Heroes Co-Created By The Marvel Comics Icon" list.

=== Impact ===
Most of the characters that appear in Marvel Comics' books are set in the same fictional universe, known as the Marvel Universe. They occasionally make guest appearances in each other's books, and more regularly in team books, such as The Avengers. Such crossovers encouraged readers to buy other Marvel comics, so that readers could become engrossed not just in the individual characters but in their web of relationships across the broader setting. DC Comics pioneered this idea with the Justice Society of America, likewise promoting and developing the DC Universe. Some readers devoted themselves to just one of these two comic book universes, so that the superhero fan community developed sub-communities of DC devotees and Marvel devotees.

==== Marvel Cinematic Universe ====
Marvel Studios repeated this business strategy when it produced the Marvel Cinematic Universe (MCU), culminating with the release of The Avengers in 2012. Before the MCU, superhero movies were usually isolated productions, but the shared universe model has led to its continued growing success. In response, Warner Brothers (which owns DC Comics) began to produce its own series of interconnected superhero movies known as the DC Extended Universe (DCEU), culminating with Justice League in 2017. Movies tend to have bigger audiences than comic books, so, the general public became more aware that the likes of Wonder Woman and Captain America existed in separate universes owned by different companies. The movies raised brand awareness of DC Comics and Marvel Comics.

As of June 2022, the MCU is the highest-grossing film franchise in history, having collectively grossed over $26 billion in box-office revenue, more than twice that of the second largest franchise, Star Wars.

== Theme park attractions ==
=== Avengers Campus ===
After the acquisition by Disney in 2009, Marvel films began to be marketed at the Innoventions attraction in Tomorrowland at Disneyland. For Iron Man 3, the exhibit, entitled "Iron Man Tech Presented by Stark Industries", featured the same armor display that was shown at the 2012 San Diego Comic-Con, with the Marks I-VII and the new Mark XLII. In addition, there was a simulator game, titled "Become Iron Man", that used Kinect-like technology to allow the viewer to be encased in an animated Mark XLII armor and take part in a series of "tests," in which you fire repulsor rays and fly through Tony Stark's workshop. The game was guided by J.A.R.V.I.S., who is voiced again by Paul Bettany. The exhibit also had smaller displays that included helmets and chest pieces from the earlier films and the gauntlet and boot from an action sequence in Iron Man 3. The exhibit for Thor: The Dark World was called "Thor: Treasures of Asgard", and featured displays of Asgardian relics and transports guests to Odin's throne room, where they were greeted by Thor. Captain America: The Winter Soldier's exhibit, "Captain America: The Living Legend and Symbol of Courage", featured a meet and greet experience.

From May to September 2017, Disneyland Resort featured the "Summer of Heroes", which sees members of the Guardians and Avengers making appearances throughout the Disneyland Resort. Additionally, the Guardians of the Galaxy: Awesome Dance Off event was featured, which involved Peter Quill / Star-Lord blasting music from his boombox, along with the Avengers Training Initiative, a limited experience where Black Widow and Hawkeye "assemble a group of young recruits to see if they have what it takes to be an Avenger." Marvel-related food and merchandise was also available throughout Hollywood Land at Disney California Adventure during the "Summer of Heroes".

In March 2018, the Walt Disney Company announced three new Marvel-themed areas inspired by the MCU to Disney California Adventure, Walt Disney Studios Paris, and Hong Kong Disneyland. The developments will be designed by Walt Disney Imagineering in collaboration with Marvel Studios and Marvel Themed Entertainment. As was established with Guardians of the Galaxy – Mission: Breakout!, Avengers Campus exists in its own theme park universe that is inspired by the MCU. Being in the MCU multiverse, Avengers Campus has a shared history with the MCU proper, with a few notable exceptions being the Blip from Avengers: Infinity War did not occur, and some characters who died, such as Tony Stark, are still alive.

==== Walt Disney Studios Park ====
In March 2018, the Walt Disney Company announced a new Marvel-themed area inspired by the MCU to Disneyland Paris' Walt Disney Studios Park. The area includes a reimagined attraction where riders team up with Iron Man and other Avengers on a "hyper-kinetic adventure" on July 20, 2022. The park also hosted the "Summer of Super Heroes" live-action stage show from June–September 2018.

=== Avengers: Quantum Encounter ===
In July 2021, the immersive family dining experience "Avengers: Quantum Encounter" at the Worlds of Marvel restaurant on the Disney Wish cruise line was announced, which debuted when the cruise began voyages on July 14, 2022. The experience takes place during dinner with interactive elements and a full CGI recreation of the Wish's upper decks. Paul Rudd, Evangeline Lilly, Anthony Mackie, Brie Larson, Kerry Condon, and Iman Vellani reprised their MCU roles, while Ross Marquand voiced Ultron after previously doing so in What If...?, in which he replaced James Spader. Chris Waitt directed Rudd and Lilly's content, which was written by Steven Spiegel and featured visual effects by Framestore.

=== Avengers S.T.A.T.I.O.N. ===
In May 2014, the Avengers S.T.A.T.I.O.N. (Scientific Training and Tactical Intelligence Operative Network) exhibit opened at the Discovery Times Square center. The exhibit features replica set pieces, as well as actual props from the films, mixed with interactive technology and information, crafted through a partnership with NASA and other scientists. Titus Welliver also provides a "debrief" to visitors, reprising his role as S.H.I.E.L.D. agent Felix Blake. Created by Victory Hill Exhibits, Avengers S.T.A.T.I.O.N. cost $7.5 million to create, and ran through early September 2015.

The exhibit also opened in South Korea at the War Memorial of Korea in April 2015, in Paris, France, at Esplanade de La Défense a year later, and in Las Vegas at the Treasure Island Hotel and Casino in June 2016. The Las Vegas version of the exhibit featured updated character details and corresponding science to incorporate the Marvel films that have released since the original exhibit in New York. Additionally, the Las Vegas version features Cobie Smulders reprising her role as Maria Hill to "debrief" visitors, replacing Welliver.

=== Avengers: Damage Control ===
In October 2019, Marvel Studios and ILMxLAB announced the virtual reality experience Avengers: Damage Control. The experience would be available for a limited time starting in mid-October 2019 at select Void VR locations. Avengers: Damage Control sees players taking control of one of Shuri's Emergency Response Suits–which combine Wakandan and Stark Industries technologies–to defeat a threat alongside Doctor Strange, Ant-Man, and the Wasp. Letitia Wright, Benedict Cumberbatch, Paul Rudd, and Evangeline Lilly all reprise their MCU roles, while Ross Marquand voices Ultron, replacing James Spader. The experience was extended to the end of 2019.

== Other versions ==
=== 1950s Avengers ===
In 1978, Roy Thomas and Don Glut retroactively created a team of 1950s comic book characters also called the Avengers, uniting the 1950s characters Marvel Boy, Venus, the 3-D Man, Gorilla-Man, M-11, Jimmy Woo, Namora, and Jann of the Jungle. Each had been published in the 1950s by Marvel's predecessor brand, Atlas Comics, but did not meet in their original publications. It was later decided that these 1978 versions of the characters exist in an alternate timeline that was erased by the time-manipulating Immortus. The Agents of Atlas, a version of the group without 3-D Man or Jann, exist in mainstream continuity and eventually reformed in the present day.

=== Avengers 1959 ===
The New Avengers vol. 2, #10 revealed another 1950s Avengers team, formed by Nick Fury to hunt the last remnants of Nazi Germany and consisted of Fury himself, Dominic Fortune, Dum Dum Dugan, Namora, Silver Sable, Sabretooth, Kraven the Hunter, and Ulysses Bloodstone. A follow-up miniseries penned by Howard Chaykin showed this group assisted by Blonde Phantom, Eric Koenig and a brand new character British wizard and spy, Powell McTeague.

=== Avengers Next ===
In the alternate future timeline known as MC2, the Avengers disbanded, with Avengers Mansion becoming a museum. An emergency forced Edwin Jarvis to sound an alert, and a new generation of heroes formed a new team of Avengers. Most of the new Avengers were children of established Marvel superheroes.

=== Secret Wars ===
During the "Secret Wars" storyline, several alternate universe versions of the Avengers reside in Battleworld.

- In the Battleworld domain of Spider-Island, the Avengers are taken over by the spider-virus, turning them into Man-Spiders obedient to the Spider-Queen until they are cured.
- In the Battleworld domain of the Regency, most of the Avengers and other known superheroes are defeated by Regent.
- In the Battleworld domain of Marville, the Avengers consist of child versions of Captain America, Black Widow, Captain Marvel, Falcon, Hawkeye, Hulk, Iron Man, Nick Fury, Scarlet Witch, She-Hulk, Spider-Man, Thor, Vision, and War Machine.
- The Battleworld domain of the Kingdom of Manhattan is a fusion of Earth-616 and Earth-1610. The Avengers of this universe consists of Captain America (both Sam Wilson and Steve Rogers), Black Widow, Hawkeye, Hulk (Doc Green), Iron Man, Ms. Marvel, Spider-Man, Thor, War Machine, Wasp, and Wonder Man.
- In the Battleworld domain of Holy Wood, the Avengers are led by Simon Williams and consists of Black Panther, Black Widow, Captain Marvel, Hercules, Jocasta, Moondragon, Vision, and Yellowjacket.
- In the Battleworld domain of 2099, the Avengers are a team of corporate superheroes sponsored by Alchemax. The group consists of Captain America, Black Widow, Iron Man, Hawkeye, and Hercules.
- In the Battleworld domain of the Walled City of New York, the Avengers consist of Captain America, Hulk, Iron Man, Rage, Scarlet Witch, She-Hulk, Spider-Man, and Thor.

=== Ultimate Marvel ===
In the Ultimate Marvel Universe, the Avengers are named the Ultimates, and were formed by Nick Fury to protect America against superhuman threats. They first appeared in The Ultimates by Mark Millar and Bryan Hitch. After the events of The Ultimates 2, the team left S.H.I.E.L.D. employment to become independent and financed by Tony Stark.

A Black Ops team called the Avengers debuted sometime after the Ultimatum storyline. This version was a project headed by Nick Fury and Gregory Stark to bring Captain America back. Its known members consisted of War Machine, Hawkeye, Black Widow, Spider, Tyrone Cash, Red Wasp, and Nerd Hulk (an intelligent clone of Hulk who lacks Hulk's rage). Additional members included Punisher and Blade.

== In other media ==
=== Television ===
Three animated series have been based on the team.

- The Avengers: United They Stand was mainly based on the Roy Thomas era of the group, and ran from 1999 to 2000.
- The Avengers: Earth's Mightiest Heroes was based on the early adventures of the team, but also used many elements from other runs. The TV show ran for two seasons, from 2010 to 2012, and started presenting the original Avengers line-up founded by Iron Man, Thor, Ant-Man, Wasp and the Hulk, who temporarily leaves the group after battling the Enchantress and Executioner. Captain America later joins the team, replacing Hulk during his absence.
- Avengers Assemble is mainly based on the MCU iteration of the group and premiered on May 26, 2013. The series later changed its title to Avengers: Ultron Revolution (2016), Avengers: Secret Wars (2017) and Avengers: Black Panther's Quest (2018).
- The Avengers appear in the Disney Junior series Spidey and His Amazing Friends.

=== Film ===
Marvel Animation has made three Avengers films, Ultimate Avengers, Ultimate Avengers 2, and Next Avengers. In addition, Avengers Confidential: Black Widow & Punisher was released as a 2014 Japanese anime film by Madhouse.

==== Marvel Cinematic Universe ====
The Avengers are prominent in current popular culture due to the iteration of the team from the Marvel Cinematic Universe by Marvel Studios.

== See also ==
- Alpha Flight – The Canadian version of the Avengers.
- Big Hero 6 – The Japanese version of the Avengers.
- Excalibur – The British version of the Avengers.
- Winter Guard – The Russian version of the Avengers.
- Justice League - A DC Comics superhero team with the same concept of the Avengers.
- List of Marvel Comics superhero debuts

== Bibliography ==
- Hickey, Andrew (2011). An Incomprehensible Condition: An Unauthorized Guide To Grant Morrison's Seven Soldiers. Lulu.com. ISBN 978-1-4477-8002-1.
- Kaveney, Roz (2008). Superheroes!: Capes and Crusaders in Comics and Films. Bloomsbury Academic. ISBN 978-1-84511-569-2.
- Alaniz, José (2023). The Avengers. Penguin Books. ISBN 978-0-14-313578-4.
- Beatty, Scott (2012). Avengers: The Ultimate Guide. DK. ISBN 978-1-4654-6682-2.
