= List of New Avengers story arcs =

This is a chronological list of story arcs in the comic book series The New Avengers created by Brian Michael Bendis and David Finch. Drawn by Finch, Leinil Francis Yu, Billy Tan, Stuart Immonen, Mike Deodato, and Howard Chaykin, The New Avengers presents the adventures of a new team of Avengers after the events of the "Avengers Disassembled" storyline.

== Storylines ==
The plot events are described, below, using in-universe tone.

=== Vol. 1 ===
Variant cover for New Avengers #1. Art by Joe Quesada.

==== Breakout (Issues #1-6) ====
Electro causes a mass supervillain break-out at the Raft, a supervillain prison, releasing supervillains from their cells. Forty-two escape, but the remaining criminals are contained thanks to the intervention of Captain America, Iron Man, Luke Cage, Jessica Drew, Spider-Man, and Matt Murdock. Concluding that fate has brought together this new team together, similar to the first Avengers team, Captain America convinces Iron Man to join a new team of Avengers, inviting the other four heroes to join, who were also present at the riot. Matt Murdock declines, unwilling to tarnish the reputation of the other heroes due to the disaster that his life has become, but the other three accept. Having contained Electro, the Avengers discover that S.H.I.E.L.D. is holding something back about the enigmatic man named Karl Lykos, who Electro was hired to specifically break out, while other prisoners simply took advantage of the chaos. Lykos's files were restricted even to Spider-Woman and Captain America. Their quest takes them into the Savage Land, where they are joined by Wolverine, and soon discover Lykos' alter-ego, Sauron. A rogue S.H.I.E.L.D unit were using the native people of the Savage Land to mine vibranium for super weapons. They are also nearly shot by the second Black Widow.

Cover art for New Avengers #7 by David Finch.

==== The Sentry (Issues #7-10) ====
Captain America and Iron Man try to discover the origins of the Sentry, a man shrouded in mystery, who saved their lives many times during the outbreak on the Raft. He was a voluntary prisoner distraught for killing his wife, even though she appears to be alive and well.

Meanwhile, Spider-Man, Spider-Woman, Luke Cage, and Wolverine track down the Wrecker and, after a dangerous battle, they manage to subdue him. After it is revealed that he has been manipulated by his Void persona and the deceased Mastermind, Sentry's mental problems are cured, though he still cannot handle the stress of his arch-foe's manipulation. Emma Frost helps Sentry to unlock the mental blocks placed on his memories and powers, and he joins the new Avengers to regain his original heroic status, in spite of his memories being out from his grasp.

This story arc reveals the existence of the Illuminati, a covert association of six of the world's most influential super-heroes. The members include Iron Man, Fantastic Four leader Reed Richards, Atlantean monarch Namor, X-Men founder Charles Xavier, mystic arts master Doctor Strange, and Black Bolt, leader of the Inhumans.

==== Ronin (Issues #11-13) ====
With Wolverine busy, the team requires a member with experience in confronting the Hand. Captain America asks Matt Murdock, who recommends Ronin, his former lover and enemy Maya Lopez (previously known as Echo). She joins the team on an expedition to Japan to seize the Silver Samurai. Ronin has not spent much time with the team since, having remained in Japan to monitor the Hand. Sentry still suffers from his own identity problems, giving him "good days and bad days".

==== Secrets & Lies (Issues #14-15) ====
The terrorist organization Hydra believes that it has Spider-Woman under its complete control. Fortunately, she does the right thing in talking to Captain America. He is true to form in confronting Jessica about her duplicity, and she bravely endangers her life by telling her story.

The New Avengers reveal their existence to the world and receive a mixed reception. Ms. Marvel returns to be told that she is, and always will be, an Avenger, though she turns down Captain America's invitation She prefers to re-establish her own solo career as a superhero, following the "House of M", which showed her the full scale of the potential she possessed. The team then must face another foe, J. Jonah Jameson.

==== The Collective (Issues #16-20) ====
In Alaska, Michael Pointer is hit by the Collective, a massive amount of energy from depowered mutants. He seemingly kills Alpha Flight as he approaches the United States. When the New Avengers arrive to stop him, Spider-Man and the Vision discover that the Collective has the power signatures of the powerless mutants.

The S.H.I.E.L.D. telepaths read Spider-Man's mind, and find what happened to reality during the House of M crisis. The Avengers arrive to free him just as he is being released from custody. Collective, meanwhile, arrives in Genosha, home to many depowered mutants, including Magneto. After learning of the Collective's location, the New Avengers invade Genosha to destroy the now-empowered Magneto. It is also learned that the entity was really Xorn, who was bent on liberating mutants and assumed Magneto's persona, knowing mutants would listen to him. In the aftermath of the fight, Magneto's body vanishes when the helicopter he is being transported in explodes, and Pointer is taken away by S.H.I.E.L.D.

==== Annual #1 ====
Yelena Belova, the Black Widow, is given the powers of the Super-Adaptoid, by agents of Hydra, for her to use against the Avengers. She ambushes an Avengers meeting just as Jessica Jones announces her agreement to Luke Cage's proposal – absorbing first the powers of the Sentry and then the rest of the Avengers, including Cage and Ms. Marvel. However, after Spider-Man realizes that she can only absorb the powers of one specific hero at once, she is defeated by Iron Man's use of automated versions of his suit and the Sentry's apparent command of the Void persona, to overwhelm her mind. This leads to her Hydra controllers then engaging a self-destruct device so she cannot be traced back to them.

==== Civil War: New Avengers: Disassembled (Issues #21-25) ====
After the Stamford, Connecticut incident, during which the reckless actions of the New Warriors resulted in Nitro killing over 600 civilians, Congress passes the Superhuman Registration Act, which requires all superhumans to register with the federal government. Many superheroes comply with this law, but others, led by Captain America, oppose the law on the grounds that it violates civil liberties. This causes a split in both the superhuman community and the New Avengers.

Luke Cage defiantly refuses to register, despite the last-minute pleas of Iron Man and Ms. Marvel. Moments after the Act goes into effect, a squadron of S.H.I.E.L.D. "Cape-Killers" attacks Cage in his home. He escapes and joins Captain America. The Sentry registers but does not choose a specific side, although he feels more compelled to join Iron Man than a rebelling Captain America. Iron Man, not trusting Spider-Woman's triple life, betrays her and informs S.H.I.E.L.D. director Maria Hill about her status. Jessica is forced to flee and later joins Cage and the others.

At first, Spider-Man is on the side of Registration, but later defects after the death of Goliath (Bill Foster) at the hands of Ragnarok.

==== Hawkeye and Scarlet Witch (Issue #26) ====
Following the end of the "House of M", Hawkeye awakes, revived a second time. Finding Avengers Mansion abandoned and dilapidated, he seeks out Doctor Strange to find if his return from the dead was real. He asks what became of the world since the House of M and what became of the Scarlet Witch. Learning she has disappeared, Hawkeye decides to seek her out for what he calls "closure". In his travels, he helps a woman catch a purse thief and the woman is revealed to be Wanda Maximoff. After having fainted, he awakes in her care at her home. It is revealed that Wanda erased her old life, giving herself the peacefulness she now enjoys. Clint subsequently breaks down in front of Wanda, and the two share an intimate moment. Hawkeye awakens the next morning and, remembering Wanda's mention of her "Aunt Agatha" who was supposedly asleep in the next room, goes to investigate; but, as he touches the doorknob, his fingers are burnt.

==== The Revolution (Issues #27-31) ====
The Hand uses magic to resurrect Maya Lopez, whose will is bent to serve Elektra. Following the Civil War, Jessica Drew reveals that Captain America was not dead, a fact Dr. Strange believes to be true after investigating in his astral form. The New Avengers, divided over whether it is a trap, conclude that they cannot risk leaving Captain America behind. In the end, it proves false, as the team is ambushed by the Mighty Avengers. They eventually escape, while the Mighty Avengers get to the Sanctum Sanctorum to find the New Avengers hidden with the help of Doctor Strange.

The next day, the Mighty Avengers decide to interrogate Danny Rand about Iron Fist's involvement in the attempt to rescue Captain America. Dakota North also brings a package from Matt Murdock. Inside is the Ronin outfit and a letter from Echo addressed to Matt, asking him to save Ronin and, if she is dead, to avenge her. The New Avengers then decide to accept Matt's request and help save Echo. After deciding that Doctor Strange is hiding the New Avengers, the Mighty Avengers enlist the help of Brother Voodoo see if they still reside at Strange's old home. Clint Barton returns to let Strange know he is okay. After some tension, Strange casts the Spell of Tartashi on them, to test for purity of intent, though this fails to detect Veranke, in Spider-Woman's guise. When they all are revealed to be pure, Clint agrees to join them as the new Ronin to Japan.

The New Avengers arrive to rescue Maya, with Spider-Man carrying her to safety. Once the two are reunited with the group, Doctor Strange teleports them, and they seek out the Silver Samurai for refuge. Spider-Man's spider sense alerts them of Elektra accompanied by thousands of Hand Ninjas. Before a fight escalates, Luke Cage attempts to negotiate, but during the negotiations, Echo wakes up and wounds Dr. Strange with an enchanted sword.

Strange contacts his home telepathically for aid. While a nervous Jessica watches, Wong, Dr. Strange's servant, assists Strange in freeing himself. Strange then forcibly clears Echo's mind, who then kills Elektra. As the Hand retreats, Elektra's body transforms into that of a Skrull. Secure in Strange's home, Jessica Jones receives news her husband is alive. A close up shows her baby's eyes have an unnaturally green tint.

==== The Trust (Issues #32-37) ====
With the hero community divided, The Hood plans to form a supervillain community that relies on one another for help and with the identities of half of the hero community available, they realize that they can kill the heroes spirit, before actually killing the hero. They also decide to stop heroes from even attempting to harm them, and by threatening her mom, they get Tigra to cooperate. Spider-Woman suggests taking the Skrull to Iron Man, but Luke Cage, in particular, points out that Tony Stark is a prime candidate for being a Skrull, given his actions over the last few months. After the plane loses power, Spider-Woman takes the body to Tony Stark.

When Iron Fist asks Doctor Strange for help with his "Iron Fist" powers (which others have been tapping into), Strange reveals that just as they obtained their positions from predecessors, there will inevitably be a new, younger Iron Fist and another Sorcerer Supreme, and to try to hold onto their positions would be folly. After spending a day apart to reflect on recent events, the group reorganizes, trusting each other due to a revelation spell by Strange that shows the others their true self. The group decides to stop the Hood's plan to attack Stark Tower. This goes badly, with one of many symbiotes taking over all the New Avengers, except Luke Cage, who is immune due to his durable skin.

In Stark Tower, Spider-Woman attends a briefing with the Mighty Avengers, having apparently defected to their team. When she retires to her room, Wolverine confronts Jessica about the Skrull body; she convinces him that what she did was right with the argument that it is more important than their problems with Iron Man. Wolverine escapes Stark Tower and rejoins the rest of the New Avengers. The team seeks out and confronts The Hood at an abandoned warehouse. Doctor Strange creates illusions of many heroes to confuse the Hood's gang while the Avengers attack. However, after he is confronted by Strange, the Hood transforms into his demonic form and escapes. Leaving the villains for the police, the Avengers celebrate their victory while Strange criticizes their foolish attack. Later, the Hood attacks the Raft and breaks out the rest of his syndicate, rallying them to take revenge against the New Avengers.

==== Annual #2 ====
Breaking into Tigra's home, the Hood learns that the team is hiding out in Doctor Strange's Sanctum Sanctorum. The element of surprise is nearly lost when Spider-Man, having left, spots the Hood's crime syndicate across the rooftops and returns to the team in a panic. The New Avengers are caught off guard when they attack. Strange is easy prey for the villain, who shoots him several times before Wong intervenes.

After the battle, Strange confesses that he has been calling upon darker forces than he normally would lately and has begun to lose control. As he teleports away, the New Avengers are confronted by Ms. Marvel, who gives them an opportunity to escape. The only villain to escape is the Hood. Jessica Jones later arrives at Stark Tower with her baby, begging to be taken into safety in return for registering.

==== Secret Invasion (Issues #38-47) ====
Luke Cage goes to Avengers Tower to confront Jessica about her decision to comply with the Superhuman Registration Act; she tries to convince Cage to comply as well. When the Mighty Avengers arrive, Ms. Marvel lets Cage go, claiming that he is thinking about registering. During this conversation, Cage refers to Stark as a Skrull, causing Black Widow to question. Spider-Woman merely states that it is classified S.H.I.E.L.D. business. Iron Fist sets the New Avengers up in a large apartment.

Echo is confronted by what appears to be Daredevil, who is quickly revealed to be a Skrull seeking to replace her. Echo and Wolverine manage to drive the Skrull off, although Wolverine is injured. Having returned to the building, Echo talks with Clint Barton, who assures her that even if she feels redundant, being an Avenger is about waiting for the right moment when you can make a difference and prove yourself. Recalling her walking in on him in the shower, and Clint mentioning that he was tempted to kiss her at the time, the two subsequently spend the night together.

Issue #40 deals with the background of the Secret Invasion as the rise of the Skrull Queen Veranke and the beginning stages of the invasion plan.

Issue #41 details Ka-Zar's discovery of the Skrulls in the Savage Land back during the time of the New Avengers' battle with Sauron and the Savage Land Mutates as told to Spider-Man when he encounters Ka-Zar while escaping the initial attack from the crashed 'Skrull' ship.

Issue #42 details how the Queen became Spider-Woman and their plans for how to take out the major players, including Mutants, leading into the events of House of M.

Issue #43 features Ka-Zar and Spider-Man confronting the Captain America from the Skrull ship, who is hit with a dart that causes him to turn back into a Skrull. It is revealed that he was brainwashed and programmed with false memories to create additional confusion. Spider-Man is also pricked with the dart, and his lack of reaction confirms him to be the real Spider-Man.

Issue #44 affords a look into how the Skrull empire came up with a way to infiltrate earth. It is revealed that they cloned the Illuminati when they were captured by the Skrulls and interrogated them for information. During the course of these interrogations, they find out that Reed Richards has an idea that the Skrulls can use. They force the Reed Richards clone to give them the formula.

Issue #45 deals with House of M and that Veranke and Criti both were well aware of what the real world was supposed to be like and that they planned on killing Wanda before she uttered her infamous phrase. It also showed the effects the Annihilation wave had on the Skrulls on earth.

==== Search for the Sorcerer Supreme (Issues #48-54) ====
Norman Osborn dismantles S.H.I.E.L.D. and assembles H.A.M.M.E.R. The roster for the New Avengers would consist of Luke Cage, Jessica Jones, Wolverine, Spider-Man, Spider-Woman, Ms. Marvel, Mockingbird, Ronin, and Captain America. When the latter joins, the New Avengers team moves into Steve Rogers' old building. They begin searching for Danielle, Cage, and Jessica's lost daughter, with the aid of the Iron Fist and the Fantastic Four. They attack various villains such as A.I.M., Hydra, and Electro for any information regarding the Skrull Jarvis. Eventually they find a Skrull pretending to be an ex-S.H.I.E.L.D. agent at a bar. After a brief confrontation, the Skrull is about to reveal the location of Danielle, when another agent shoots him in the head. Jessica is then convinced Skrull Jarvis is going to kill Danielle. Meanwhile, the rest of the New Avengers are unaware Cage is asking Norman Osborn for help in their search. However, when Cage gets his child back, he reneges on his deal with Osborn after Bullseye kills the Skrull Jarvis.

The New Avengers later witness the announcement of Osborn's own Avengers. After realizing who they really were, they send Spider-Woman to trick Osborn into leading his team into a trap, at the abandoned Hellfire Club Mansion, where they can de-power and fight them more fairly. However, Osborn realizes their plot and sends the Hood and his criminals to eliminate them. They manage to barely escape, with Spider-Woman focusing her power through Ms. Marvel. After this, Ronin addressing the country on live television, saying that they seem to have forgotten Osborn was a murderer.

Bucky later organizes a meeting with the New Avengers at his home, offering it as a base of operations. Iron Fist announces his leave, while Ronin and Ms. Marvel become leader and second-in-command, respectively. Immediately thereafter, Spider-Man is convinced to reveal his secret identity to the team once again. Dr. Strange then appears in the room, severely wounded, and pleads desperately for their help. He reveals to the team that he was attacked by the Hood while looking for Wiccan. After learning that the Hood is after the Eye of Agamotto, the team agrees to assist Strange in finding his replacement as Sorcerer Supreme. Luke Cage realizes they are being drawn to Daimon Hellstrom. However, the Hood reaches him first and attempts to kill him. Upon finding the Hood and Hellstrom, the Avengers are attacked by Madame Masque, who is taken out by Spider-Woman. Strange confronts Hellstrom, who he thinks is the next wielder of the Eye of Agamotto, but Brother Voodoo later appears with it. Together, they are able to strip the Hood of all his powers and exorcise Dormammu from his body; however, after the battle, Osborn denounces Barton's claim. This infuriates him to the point that he plans on killing Osborn.

==== Power Loss (Issues #55-60) ====
The now leaderless Hood's gang have gained access to the Stark tech-power drainer, which they plan to use to get even with Osborn. Chemistro, the villain who discovered the device, causes a commotion in Times Square, which the New Avengers respond to. All but Mockingbird are affected by the drainer. The Dark Avengers also arrive and are equally affected. The villains' representatives, the Wrecker and Jonas Harrow, demand that Osborn share the same deal he had with the Hood, in exchange for the power drainer and the New Avengers. Osborn accepts, but the New Avengers escape. Dr Strange's ex-girlfriend attempts to help Luke Cage, who is having heart problems, with the Dark Avengers surrounding the building. Cage realizes that the only way to save himself is to turn himself over. After escaping and recuperating, the New Avengers are able to rescue him. A tracker, however, was placed on his heart during surgery. With the help of Doctor Strange and Hank Pym, they were able to remove the tracker, leaving it in Norman Osborn's home just before Osborn used it to target explosives. Meanwhile, Loki brings the Hood and Madame Masque to Cuba, where she presents the former with the Asgardian Nord Stones, which he uses to restore his powers.

==== Annual #3 ====
When Barton is captured by the Dark Avengers during his attempt to assassinate Osborn, he is tortured by Mentallo to discover the location of the team's current headquarters and their identities, only to be rescued by members of the New Avengers. They then return to the team's back-up base. While Barton apologizes for his mistakes to the rest of the team, they are shocked to witness the arrival of the now-resurrected Steve Rogers, who assures them things were about to change.

==== Siege (Issues #61-64) ====
In Hell's Kitchen, thanks to the Norn Stones that were given to him, the Hood was able to power up his gang to hunt and kill the Avengers. At the hideout, which was destroyed by Norman and the Dark Avengers, Steve Rogers and Captain America initiate a recon of the old hideout, before being attacked by the Living Laser and the Corruptor, who is able to control Bucky and forces him to attack Steve. Steve is able to defeat the Corruptor, however, and free Bucky from his control. In Manhattan, Spider-Man and Spider-Woman are attacked as well, by Mandrill and Griffin, who seemingly defeat Spider-Man and try to force Spider-Woman to tell them where the Avengers are hiding.

Spider-Man is able to return to the scene using his webs, but Spider-Woman, under the control of Mandrill, attacks him. He is unable to combat her aggressive side. Spider-Man ultimately manages to prevent his companion from defeating him by attacking Mandrill and Griffin, before Spider-Woman punches and zaps them in fury. Spider-Man prevents Spider-Woman from killing the two villains, however, and tells them they must remain where they are, knowing the press and the police would later take care of them.

Meanwhile, two H.A.M.M.E.R. agents at the former Avengers hideout debate on whether to call for reinforcements. One of them dies watching the battle, only to be decapitated by a stray laser. The second is punched in the face by Luke Cage, who then ambushes the Living Laser. Bucky seemingly destroys him. As they rejoice in their victory, Cage notices a red dot on Rogers' chest. They identify it as a targeting vector, directed by Nick Fury. The former director of S.H.I.E.L.D. is assured they are not Life Model Decoys by Rogers, relieving tension. A H.A.M.M.E.R. assault squad subsequently arrives and begins an assault. The Avengers escape the battle to their safehouse, where Jessica Jones and Ms. Marvel are shocked to meet Rogers.

Asgard is shown to be under attack by Osborn, who had brought down Thor. The Avengers assemble to fight the threat.

Following the fall of Asgard, Norman Osborn's capture, and the deaths of Loki and the Sentry, the New Avengers track down the Hood and Madame Masque, capturing them along with Count Nefaria. They return to New York, where Rogers confirms Osborn had fallen, and that they were all free. Cage suggests they celebrate by going for a walk in the daylight with his teammates.

=== Vol. 2 ===
==== Possession (Issues #1-6) ====
With Rogers in charge of coordinating the heroes, he and Tony Stark sell Avengers Mansion to Luke Cage for a dollar, explaining that they are giving Cage freedom to have his own Avengers team run his way. Just after recruiting various heroes to the team, the Eye of Agamotto appears alongside a possessed Doctor Strange and Daimon Hellstrom. Cage's efforts to tell them to depart resulted in him being mutated into a flaming monster when he comes in contact with the Eye. During the fight, the demon possessing Cage 'jumps' into Iron Fist, who subsequently vanishes into a white void, where he confronts the Ancient One- who claims to be responsible for the current events out of disgust at Strange's recent 'failures'- while the rest of the team face a demonic invasion. As Strange deduces that their opponent must be new as nobody the teams have fought before would have anything to gain by the destruction of reality, Iron Fist returns, claiming that the Ancient One has told him that Strange stole the Eye, but Strange realises that the entity Iron Fist encountered is not the Ancient One as his attempts to claim the Eye contradict everything Strange was taught about the Eye's history. A casual comment by Spider-Man prompts the New Avengers to realise that Agamotto himself is behind recent events as he tries to reclaim his Eye, inspiring Doctor Voodoo to challenge Agamotto to a duel, using Wolverine as a 'vessel' for the powers of the other New Avengers to fight Agamotto in his stead. Despite their best efforts, Wolverine is unable to defeat Agamotto on his own, forcing Brother Voodoo to apparently sacrifice himself and destroy the Eye to contain Agamotto.

==== Date Night (Issue #7-13) ====
After Agamotto's take over, the New Avengers (now made of Doctor Strange, Luke Cage, Spider-Man, Wolverine, Ms. Marvel, Jessica Jones, Victoria Hand, and Iron Fist) discuss team structure, and Hand tells them that Steve Rogers is paying them. Cage is skeptical at first, until Jessica tells him that they are low on money. The only one unable to be paid is Spider-Man, who has not revealed his identity yet. Meanwhile, Jessica and Cage hire Squirrel Girl with their newfound money as their nanny, and Wong moves in with the New Avengers. While Cage and Jessica Jones are out on a 'date' to discuss Jessica's future role in the team, they are attacked by a Doombot which the rest of the team only just manages to stop, Hand mentioning that the other Avengers teams are concerned about this development but unable to reveal more due to Spider-Man's unknown identity preventing her from sharing such confidential information with him.

When the group mount an assault on an arms base based on a tip-off from Victoria Hand, Mockingbird is shot, causing the group to take her to hospital while also sending their enemies to prison, prompting the shocked discovery that the base was owned by remnants of H.A.M.M.E.R. Although the New Avengers speculate that Hand set them up, she reveals to Steve Rogers that she was actually attempting to set up the H.A.M.M.E.R. agents after she was approached to join them.

The story is interspaced by flashbacks to Nick Fury assembling an early Avengers team in the 1950s - Dominic Fortune, Dum Dum Dugan, Namora, Silver Sable, Sabretooth, Kraven the Hunter and Ulysses Bloodstone - to hunt the remnants of the Red Skull's agents, culminating in them facing the Skull before the fight is interrupted by Captain America.

== Miniseries and one-shots ==
=== New Avengers: Illuminati ===
==== Volume 1 ====
New Avengers: Illuminati (Volume 1) is a special one-issue publication, released as part of the "Road to Civil War". It documents the founding of the Illuminati. Years later, the Illuminati meet to determine the fate of the Hulk. Deciding that there is no hope for Bruce Banner, all but Namor agree on exiling him, leading to the events of Planet Hulk. The final time the Illuminati meet is prior to the passing of the Superhuman Registration Act. The group becomes divided as to whether to support the act or not. Black Bolt declares war on the United States and humanity. With most of the members gone, it is implied that the team was over, with Mr. Fantastic telling Iron Man that it "was fun while it lasted".

==== Volume 2 ====
New Avengers: Illuminati (Volume 2) is a five-issue series, detailing previously unknown activities of the Illuminati. Issue #1 recounts the group's ill-fated confrontation with the Skrull emperor Dorrek, shortly after the Kree-Skrull War. In issue #2, the group collects the six Infinity Gems, distributing one to each member for safekeeping. In issue #3, it is revealed the Beyonder is actually a mutant member of the Inhumans. In issue #4, the group coerces the Kree warrior Noh-Varr into ending his war against Earth. In issue #5, Iron Man brings the Elektra Skrull's corpse to the group. Subsequently, they are attacked by a group of Super-Skrulls, including one who had been impersonating Black Bolt.

=== Avengers: Free Comic Book Day 2009 ===
Avengers: Free Comic Book Day 2009 was released on May 2, 2009, as one of the one-shot publications offered by Marvel Comics on Free Comic Book Day. In this in-continuity tale taking place shortly after the events of Secret Invasion, the New Avengers must team up with Norman Osborn's government-sanctioned Dark Avengers to battle the Norse frost giant Ymir. After the teams successfully drive him away, Osborn tries to arrest the New Avengers, but Thor intervenes and warns him not to do so. Osborn and his team back down, letting them go for the time being.

== Appearances outside The New Avengers ==
=== The New Avengers/Transformers ===
Taking place between the first two arcs of New Avengers, New Avengers/Transformers chronicles a mission to Latveria by Captain America, Luke Cage, Spider-Man, and Wolverine to prevent a war between Latveria and the neighboring country of Symkaria. Former Avengers Ms. Marvel and the Falcon also make guest appearances. Along with Optimus Prime and other Autobots, the heroes must deal with Doctor Doom and the Decepticons led by Megatron.

=== House of M ===
The New Avengers and the Astonishing X-Men gather to decide the fate of Wanda Maximoff, the Scarlet Witch. She is being watched by Charles Xavier and Magneto on Genosha, but upon the two teams arriving she uses her powers to alter the world into an alternate timeline.

=== Thunderbolts ===
The CSA give the Thunderbolts a mission to defeat the, unsanctioned, New Avengers. The team defeat the New Avengers (sans Wolverine, Spider-Woman and Ronin who are absent) and Songbird claims they could do so whenever they wish. However, this was all a diversion so that Joystick could plant surveillance equipment in Stark Tower. She succeeded but was thoroughly beaten up by Spider-Woman.

=== Civil War ===
During Civil War, the New Avengers, along with a majority of other heroes, deal with the passing of the Registration Law.

=== Fallen Son ===
During the miniseries, Wolverine and Daredevil infiltrate the S.H.I.E.L.D. helicarrier to confirm Captain America's death. The New Avengers are seen playing poker with the Thing. Another comic shows Clint Barton initially making contact with Tony Stark and agreeing to become the new Captain America, only to turn the offer down after a meeting with Kate Bishop, which shows him how disrespectful he is being to his friend's memory. Spider-Man and Wolverine later confront each other over their grief at Cap's death. The final issues shows the New Avengers watching the funeral from Doctor Strange's Sanctum Sanctorum, none of them daring to actually attend the funeral in case they are captured.

=== World War Hulk ===
When Iron Man flies into space to sort out some satellites due to the approach of the Hulk and his allies, Doctor Strange appears to him in astral form offering the New Avengers' services. Iron Man accepts his offer and says he will give them amnesty if they assist and surrender afterwards. Luke Cage and Spider-Man are among the heroes who aid in the evacuation of New York as the Hulk returns on a mission of vengeance. They are later joined by Spider-Woman, but all three are defeated in a showdown with the Hulk's Warbound. Hulk had already confronted Wolverine during his "mission" to question Professor X about his role in the decision to exile the Hulk. Later, Hulk's allies, Hiroim and Elloe, attempt to infiltrate the Sanctum Sanctorum, and are confronted by Iron Fist, Echo, and Ronin, who are all handily dispatched. Strange, however, invokes the power of the demon Zom, and defeats Hiroim before leaving to confront the Hulk. After a brutal match with the Hulk, Strange is defeated and taken to Madison Square, where he is pitted against the rest of the Illuminati.

Luke Cage and Spider-Man, accompanied by the Thing, face off with Hiroim, Brood, and Elloe once again. The New Avengers gain the upper hand but abandon the fight when they realize the Warbound do not wish to continue. While the Warbound leave, the New Avengers continue to aid in the relief efforts.

=== Secret Invasion ===
Iron Man receives notification from S.H.I.E.L.D. that a Skrull ship is about to crash in the Savage Land. He immediately orders the Mighty Avengers to intercept it, but Spider-Woman contacts her former teammates to give them a head start. With help from Cloak, they are transported to a landing pad where Black Widow is preparing a Quinjet. Spider-Man and Ronin quickly incapacitate her and then remove the devices that would allow Iron Man to shut down the aircraft remotely. The Quinjet is destroyed by a dinosaur upon arrival in the Savage Land. The New Avengers find the crashed Skrull ship just as the Mighty Avengers arrive. Cage refuses to acknowledge Iron Man's authority when he tries to arrest him and forces open the crashed ship. This throws the Skrulls' plan into motion, as Skrulls in disguise cripple Stark Industries, S.H.I.E.L.D., S.W.O.R.D., and the Baxter Building, incapacitate Reed Richards, and release the supervillain prisoners held in the Raft and the Cube.

Shockingly, it is also revealed that Spider-Woman was replaced by the Skrull queen Veranke, prior to the prison break at the Raft which led to the formation of the New Avengers. Thus, the real Spider-Woman was never a member of the team.

During the run of the main Secret Invasion title, the New Avengers played a major role in the main series of the event while their book shifted to portray supplementary material of the event, including the background information on the motivations of the Skrulls. In the aftermath of Secret Invasion, the new team roster consists of Captain America, Spider-Man, Ronin, Mockingbird, Luke Cage, Ms. Marvel, Wolverine and the true Spider-Woman (Jessica Drew), who was revealed to be alive and well in Secret Invasion #8.

=== Dark Reign ===
Following Ms Marvel's demise at the hands of Norman Osborn's agents, she is recorporated by various baby M.O.D.O.C.s with the aid of the New Avengers, despite the efforts of the new Ms Marvel to stop them.

=== The Incredible Hercules: Assault on New Olympus ===
Spider-Man, Wolverine, and Spider-Woman are amongst the New Avengers members who answer Hercules' call in his plan to attack his mother Hera on Mount Olympus.
