= Cabal (comics) =

Marvel Comics supervillain team

Publication information
- Publisher: Marvel Comics
- First appearance: Secret Invasion #8 (January 2009)
- Created by: Brian Michael Bendis (writer); Leinil Francis Yu (artist)

In-story information
- Member(s): Current members: Namor; Thanos; Maximus; Terrax; Corvus Glaive; Proxima Midnight; Black Swan; Maker; Former members: Norman Osborn; The Hood; Taskmaster; White Queen; Doctor Doom; Loki

The Cabal is a secret society of supervillains and antiheroes appearing in American comic books published by Marvel Comics. A villainous counterpart to the Illuminati, the group was formed in the "Dark Reign" storyline shortly after the "Secret Invasion" event.

== Publication history ==
The Cabal first appeared in Secret Invasion #8 and was created by Brian Michael Bendis and Leinil Francis Yu.

== Fictional team history ==
During a presentation shown by Bendis during the 2008 convention season, a picture was made public of a second Illuminati group consisting of villains and former villains. Presented in the same pose as the cover of Illuminati #1, this group was revealed to include Namor, Doctor Doom, Emma Frost, Loki, The Hood, and Norman Osborn. Namor is revealed to be affiliated with two different Illuminati groups simultaneously allied with both heroes and villains.

Uncanny X-Men writer Matt Fraction mentioned in an interview that the Uncanny X-Men annual in January would explain how Frost was invited into the team. Loki was revealed to have dealings with Doom in the pages of Thor, and Namor was shown to have formed an alliance with Doom at the end of his last limited series. Namor had previously been aligned with Doom in the 1970s series Super-Villain Team-Up. A past connection between Frost and Namor was presented in Uncanny X-Men Annual #2, where it was revealed that Frost and Namor shared a brief romance while attempting to recruit Namor into the Hellfire Club as the new White King.

The group, referred as the Cabal in certain interviews and in Marvel Spotlight: Dark Reign, first appeared at the ending of Secret Invasion #8 when Osborn greets the villains after gaining control of the Fifty State Initiative program.

The Cabal parallels the original Illuminati and Bendis has said "[t]he idea was, in the original pitch, that there was a secret group, a cabal, that got put together that was the mirror image of the Illuminati, with five or six characters who almost mirrored the other group."

- Norman Osborn, like Tony Stark, he is now a fugitive from the law and having lost his company, his morale, and his friends, is a human entrepreneur who works with the government. Norman also has a mysterious, powerful ally backing him up in case of betrayal, later revealed to be the Void.
- Doctor Doom represents the scientific side of the Marvel Universe, like his longtime rival Mister Fantastic.
- Emma Frost serves as the telepathic mutant representative, like Professor X before her. Unlike the rest of the Cabal, Frost's motives for joining the Cabal can be seen as righteous, due to her desire to forge an alliance with Osborn that will protect mutantkind from governmental tyranny.
- Loki is the Norse god of mischief, whose mastery of sorcery mirrors Doctor Strange's. Loki is a prominent member of a superhuman community outside of society, the Asgardians (the Norse Gods).
- The Hood mirrors Black Bolt, a hero-king in charge of a group of powerful outsiders. He also represents the criminal element of society. His link to Dormammu also places him in the mirror side of Doctor Strange. The Hood is shown to be superior to Strange, as said by Strange himself when the two struggled.
- Namor has served in both groups; he is also the subject of dual alliances within the Cabal to potentially bring down Osborn, having made side deals with Frost and Doom to aid them if they ever should move against Osborn.

=== Dark Reign ===
The Cabal are gathered for the second time since their first meeting, after the banishment of Thor, projected upon a psychic plane by Emma Frost, who reminds them to set up psychic shields. Doctor Doom scoffs arrogantly that he has no need of such things, and Loki cautions him otherwise, as they are all of dubious trustworthiness. Loki seeks to use her own Avengers to weaken and break Osborn, a goal shared by Doom and Namor, and gathers all of them once more in her previous guise as the Scarlet Witch.

Namor and Doctor Doom are secretly working behind Osborn's back, aware that their plots against Osborn could erupt into a massive battle. Morgan le Fay desperately attempts to warn Osborn that Doom will betray him, but he ignores her. Loki had been preparing to place "cracks" in Osborn's mental armor to hasten his eventual fall from power, using the Mighty Avengers for such a purpose, and scheming to set the Mighty Avengers against his Dark Avengers.

Loki questions Doom not placing his trust in him even after all these months, but Doom warns him that Doom is not the puppet of men, gods, or tricksters and that even if he was so inclined to place such trust in others, he understands that there are empty vessels in which trust should never be placed in, claiming that Loki was "false". It is revealed that Doom also desires to use the Asgardians to his own ends.

As the X-Men and Dark X-Men prepare to face off, Frost reveals her role as a double agent, hardened through her discovery of Xavier's torture and Osborn's lack of concern for mutants, defeating the Dark X-Men with Namor's assistance. Frost extends an invitation to Cloak and Dagger to join the true X-Men as they teleport to Utopia. Both Frost and Namor's relationship with Osborn appear to be deeply strained at this point, with Osborn telling the Dark Avengers and Dark X-Men to bring him Namor's head and Frost's heart and that Cyclops sees them do it. Frost and Namor both officially quit the Cabal, to be replaced with two new members.

Norman Osborn chooses Taskmaster as the fifth member of his new Cabal, despite doubts from the Hood. Osborn warns the Hood that one or both of them might soon turn against them due to Frost and Namor's betrayal destabilizing the Cabal. But Osborn adds that he is prepared for, such betrayals and after dealing with them, he will form a new Cabal, an organization he can control completely.

In the Siege storyline, Osborn reunites the Cabal, having succumbed to his Green Goblin persona and the fear that Asgard would pose a threat to the natural order and Earth itself. Osborn's ally, the Void, violently attacks Doom, who is revealed to be a Doombot. Loki and Osborn manipulate Volstagg into destroying Soldier Field, prompting a war against Asgard.

Following a brutal battle, Thor manages to kill the Void along with his good half, Sentry. Osborn, the Hood, and Taskmaster are all eventually apprehended and placed in custody, while Frost and Namor remain with the X-Men and Doctor Doom remains ruler of Latveria.

=== New Cabal ===
During the reborn Illuminati's quest to save Earth from the incursions, collisions between universes, the moral cost begins to overwhelm the members, except Namor. When the Illuminati decides to give up, Namor brings together a new Cabal consisting of himself, Thanos, Maximus, Corvus Glaive, Proxima Midnight, Terrax, and Black Swan to destroy the other worlds. Eight months later, having taken over the ruins of Wakanda as a base, the new Cabal is given permission by Earth's governments to take down the incursions, though Namor admits his Cabal members are more vicious and uncontrollable than he thought. Growing disgusted with their slaughter, Namor collaborates with the Illuminati in a plan to destroy the Cabal by trapping them on the next universe to be destroyed, but Black Panther and Black Bolt leave Namor to die for his past actions. Unbeknownst to the Avengers, however, that world ended up having two simultaneous Incursions, allowing Namor and the Cabal to escape to the third Earth, the Ultimate Marvel Earth, and upon arrival, meeting that universe's Reed Richards. When the final incursion occurs, the Cabal escape in a specially designed life-pod.

== Other versions ==
An alternate universe iteration of the Cabal from Earth-2099 appear in Marvel 2099, consisting of Norman Osborn, Bruto Olafsen, Manfredi, Chief Woland, Crossbones, and Carnage.

== In other media ==
=== Television ===
Two incarnations of the Cabal appear in Avengers Assemble.

- Throughout the first season, the Red Skull and MODOK resolve to counter the Avengers by forming the Cabal and invite Attuma, Doctor Doom, Dracula, Justin Hammer's Super-Adaptoid, and Hyperion to join them, though all but Doom agree to do so. After Red Skull obtains the Tesseract, Iron Man convinces the Cabal to help the Avengers against him. MODOK later assumes leadership of the Cabal.
- A second incarnation of the Cabal appears in the fourth season, led by Loki and consisting of the Leader, Arnim Zola, Kang the Conqueror, the Enchantress, and the Executioner.

=== Video games ===
- The Cabal makes a cameo appearance in Marvel Avengers: Battle for Earth.
- The Cabal appears in Marvel Contest of Champions, led by the Red Skull and consisting of the Iron Patriot, Loki, the Kingpin, and Punisher 2099.

=== Miscellaneous ===
The Cabal appears in the comic book prequel for Marvel vs. Capcom 3: Fate of Two Worlds, consisting of Doctor Doom, Magneto, MODOK, Super-Skrull, Taskmaster, Albert Wesker, and Akuma.

== See also ==
- Dark Reign
- Dark Avengers
- Dark X-Men
