= Corvus Glaive =

Marvel Comics supervillain

- Corvus Glaive as depicted in Infinity #3 (November 2013) by In-Hyuk Lee

Publication information
- Publisher: Marvel Comics
- First appearance: Infinity: Free Comic Book Day (May 2013)
- Created by: Jonathan Hickman; Jim Cheung

In-story information
- Team affiliations: Black Order
- Partnerships: Proxima Midnight; Supergiant
- Abilities: Superhuman strength, speed, stamina, durability, endurance, and senses; Expert hand-to-hand combatant; Immortality (via glaive)

Corvus Glaive is a supervillain appearing in American comic books published by Marvel Comics. Created by writer Jonathan Hickman and artist Jim Cheung, he is a prominent member of the Black Order, a team of aliens who work for Thanos.

Glaive has made several appearances in media, including television series and films. David Kaye voices him in animation, and Michael James Shaw portrays him in the Marvel Cinematic Universe films Avengers: Infinity War and Avengers: Endgame.

== Publication history ==
Corvus Glaive was created by writer Jonathan Hickman and artist Jim Cheung, and first appeared in Infinity: Free Comic Book Day (May 2013).

The character was described by Hickman as "Thanos' most favored. Corvus is cruel, arrogant and the most loyal of the Black Order. A warrior who betrayed his people and sold his soul to Thanos to pursue a different kind of glory".

Editor Tom Breevort has said:

He was the one character among the generals who was designed by Jim, and he was designed by Jim specifically because this story was being done and Jim had to get to him first. In essence, this is no different than any other design challenge. Jonathan laid the particulars of the characters out on the table, Jim went to town and did a few designs — different roughs for the head and so forth. We selected from that and away he went. He's the most prominent of the five lieutenants. He's Thanos' second-in-command and the one who most readily speaks for him, and yet you want him to have a certain amount of visual contrast to Thanos. While Thanos is a fairly big, blocky character and really became that over the years, Corvus — he's not skinny, but he's more slender, more lithe, more wiry — sort of in reflection of the glaive weapon that he carries. He's like the physical personification of that in a sense.

== Fictional character biography ==
Corvus Glaive is a member of Thanos' Black Order. He was chosen for his mastery in combat and tactical abilities and thus was chosen to lead the group. He is also the husband of fellow order member Proxima Midnight. His first order is to attack Earth to please his master. He attacks the Jean Grey School for Higher Learning, but is called away when Ebony Maw finds Thanos' son Thane. Corvus is obliterated by Hyperion while Thane overpowers the group and freezes Thanos and Proxima in amber. However, Corvus revives himself using his glaive.

Corvus meets up with Namor, who frees Proxima and Thanos, and asks that they join his Cabal due to his own anger towards Earth. However, Namor soon finds himself hating the Cabal's tactics and vows to work with the Illuminati to defeat them. Namor is betrayed, with him and the Cabal being trapped in a universe that is going to be destroyed. They all manage to escape into the Ultimate Marvel universe and vow to get revenge. The Cabal members escape the destruction of the multiverse via a life raft and end up on Battleworld.

Corvus returns to his own universe when the multiverse is restored and forms his own version of the Black Order, slowly building his army all over the galaxy. However, Thanos returns and confronts Corvus. Not wanting to be killed by Thanos, Corvus kills himself using the pieces of his destroyed glaive.

Corvus Glaive later returns from the dead when the Black Order is reformed by Challenger. Corvus and the Order face off against an alien version of the Lethal Legion formed by Grandmaster in a contest where Earth is the battlefield.

== Powers and abilities ==
Corvus Glaive possesses the typical attributes of a super powered individual including super strength, speed, endurance, senses and some invulnerability. His namesake weapon gives him immortality and can be summoned to his hand at will.

== In other media ==
=== Television ===
- Corvus Glaive appears in Avengers Assemble, voiced by David Kaye.
- Corvus Glaive appears in Guardians of the Galaxy, voiced again by David Kaye.

=== Marvel Cinematic Universe ===
Corvus Glaive appears in media set in the Marvel Cinematic Universe, voiced and motion-captured by Michael James Shaw.

- Glaive is introduced in Avengers: Infinity War (2018). He and the Children of Thanos assist their father Thanos in finding the Infinity Stones. Glaive and his wife Proxima Midnight attempt to retrieve the Mind Stone from Vision, but are defeated by Steve Rogers, Natasha Romanoff, and Sam Wilson. During a second attempt in Wakanda, Glaive infiltrates Shuri's lab to attack Vision again. However, Vision defends himself and knocks Glaive into a window, with both falling into a nearby forest below. Rogers intervenes, but Glaive incapacitates him before Vision kills the latter.
- An alternate timeline variant of Glaive appears in Avengers: Endgame (2019). He travels with Thanos and his army via the Quantum Realm to stop the Avengers from foiling Thanos' plans, only to be killed by Okoye.
- An alternate timeline variant of Glaive appears in the What If...? episode "What If... T'Challa Became a Star-Lord?" (2021), voiced by Fred Tatasciore.

=== Video games ===
- Corvus Glaive appears as a mini-boss and a boss in Marvel Avengers Alliance.
- Corvus Glaive appears as a boss and unlockable playable character in Marvel Future Fight.
- Corvus Glaive appears as an unlockable playable character in Lego Marvel Super Heroes 2 via the DLC "Marvel's Avengers: Infinity War Movie Level Pack".
- Corvus Glaive appears as an unlockable playable character and mini-boss in Marvel Contest of Champions.
- Corvus Glaive appears as a support character in Marvel Puzzle Quest.
- Corvus Glaive appears as a playable character in Marvel End Time Arena.
- Corvus Glaive appears as a boss in Marvel Ultimate Alliance 3: The Black Order, voiced again by David Kaye.
- Corvus Glaive appears in Marvel Snap.
