= Noh-Varr =

Marvel Comics character

- Noh-Varr (center) on the cover to Marvel Boy #1; Art by J. G. Jones.

Publication information
- Publisher: Marvel Comics
- First appearance: As Noh-Varr: Marvel Boy #1 (August 2000); As Captain Marvel: Dark Avengers #1 (March 2009); As Protector: Ms. Marvel #50 (April 2010)
- Created by: Grant Morrison (writer); J. G. Jones (artist)

In-story information
- Full name: Noh-Varr
- Species: Kree
- Team affiliations: Plex; Kree Empire; 18th Kree Diplomatic Gestalt; Dark Avengers; Avengers; Young Avengers; West Coast Avengers; Champions; Inhumans; Guardians of the Galaxy
- Notable aliases: Marvel Boy; Captain Marvel; Protector
- Abilities: Eugenic/Microtech enhanced Kree physiology granting: Superhuman strength, durability, speed, agility, stamina, and reflexes; Saliva containing nano-active properties infecting the bodies and minds of those it touches causing hallucinations and granting psyche-control; Fingernails able to grow into explosive and toxic deadly crystalline spikes; Energy projection; Self-Sustenance; Wall-crawling; Flight; Access to advanced extra-dimensional technology; Genius level intellect

Noh-Varr is a superhero appearing in American comic books published by Marvel Comics. Created by writer Grant Morrison and artist J.G. Jones, the character first appeared in Marvel Boy #1 (August 2000). He later appeared in the Civil War: Young Avengers/Runaways and the New Avengers: Illuminati limited series. After his appearance in Secret Invasion, he joined the Dark Avengers. He was a member of the main Avengers team. He was a part of the Young Avengers, West Coast Avengers, and Guardians of the Galaxy. The character has also been known as Marvel Boy, Captain Marvel, and Protector at various points in his history.

Noh-Varr has been described as one of Marvel's most notable and powerful male heroes, being labeled as a queer sex symbol.

== Publication history ==
Marvel Boy was a 6-issue limited series published from August 2000 to March 2001, as part of the experimental Marvel Knights line. The series was written by Grant Morrison, illustrated by J.G. Jones (with Sean Parsons) and colored by Matt Milla of Avalon Studios. In a 2000 interview, Morrison described their stylistic intentions for the book:

Not only am I working with one of the best comics artists ever [Jones], the colouring gauntlet has been thrown down once again with the most incredible video game lighting and atmospherics. The whole thing really becomes something new with issue 3, however, which I'm unusually proud of. ... [T]hat was the issue I really began to utilise J.G. Jones' preposterous genius to its best effects and decided to rethink the prevailing vogue for cinematic/money shot panel structures and page layouts. Marvel Boy's visual style becomes more like MTV and adverts; from #3 on its filled with all kinds of new techniques; rapid cuts, strobed lenticular panels, distressed layouts, 64 panel grids, whatever. We've only started to experiment but already MARVEL BOY looks like nothing else around. Some of the stuff J. G. is doing is like an update of the whole Steranko Pop Art approach to the comics page. Instead of Orson Welles, op art and spy movies, J.G.'s using digital editing effects, percussive rhythms, cutting the action closer and harder, illuminated by the frantic glow of the image-crazed hallucination of 21st century media culture and all that. Comics do not need to be like films. They do not need to look like storyboards. ... I wanted to go back and explore some of the possibilities of comics as music.

Following his own mini, he was featured in Civil War: Young Avengers/Runaways and the New Avengers: Illuminati. He took a big part in the finale of the Secret Invasion, which leads into his new role as Captain Marvel in the Dark Avengers title. The writer Brian Michael Bendis has said "what he represents is Norman can put an alien on the team, whose [sic] one of the Anti-Skrulls. It's like, 'You hate Skrulls? Well this guy kills Skrulls for a living! He came to our planet to kill Skrulls!'." He appeared as a regular character in the Dark Avengers series from issue #1-6.

In the Dark Avengers Annual, Noh-Varr changed his codename to the Protector. As Protector, he appeared as a regular character in the 2010-2013 Avengers series, from issue #2 (August 2010) through his dismissal from the team in issue #27 (August 2012) during the Avengers vs. X-Men storyline.

Noh-Varr appeared as Marvel Boy in the 2013 Young Avengers series by Kieron Gillen and Jamie McKelvie where he begins to date Kate Bishop and reveals that, like the majority of the team, he is "not completely straight".

Marvel Boy starred alongside the Inhumans in 2017's Royals written by Al Ewing and drawn by Jonboy Meyers.

In 2019, he returned in the third volume of the West Coast Avengers, he met the team while he was masquerading as Graviton, who was a member of the Masters of Evil, he would aid the team and eventually join them in the last story-arc. It was written by Kelly Thompson It was during this run that it was confirmed Noh-Varr is bisexual, since he started dating Kate Bishop's former boyfriend and teammate, Fuse.

In 2020, Marvel Boy was featured as a member of a new Guardians of the Galaxy team alongside Star-Lord, Rocket Raccoon, Moondragon, Phyla-Vell, Hercules and Nova.

== Fictional character biography ==
Noh-Varr serves as an ensign aboard the 18th Kree Diplomatic Gestalt interstellar schooner the Marvel, which traverses millions of alternate dimensions on its way home. The ship is drawn toward the Marvel Universe and shot down by the forces of Doctor Midas, a multi-trillionaire obsessed with gaining powers through the absorption of cosmic rays. Midas blasts the Marvel out of the sky in an attempt to acquire the ship's cosmic ray-powered engines. His friends and comrades killed, Noh-Varr emerges as the only survivor.

Noh-Varr then encounters the sentient corporation known as Hexus. Accidentally released from a containment cell when the Marvel crashed, Hexus begins to take over world-wide commerce in an attempt to subjugate the human population and ultimately control Earth. Noh-Varr invades the control center of Hexus and ultimately destroys the "social parasite" by releasing all of its trade secrets to its competitors.

Noh-Varr finds himself pursued by Doctor Midas and his minions, and upon striking an alliance with Midas' daughter Oubliette, Noh-Varr defeats the megalomaniac. After the battle, agents of S.H.I.E.L.D. capture Noh-Varr and incarcerate him in a seemingly inescapable prison known as the Cube. While in custody, Noh-Varr declares war on Earth and the human race.

=== New Avengers: Illuminati ===
Noh-Varr at one stage gets the attention of the Illuminati. Its members: Professor X, Mister Fantastic, Black Bolt, Iron Man, Doctor Strange, and Namor are worried about the fact Noh-Varr has declared war on the entire planet and try to change his mind. They visit him at the Cube in the form of a mental projection, and speak to him in turn, explaining the legacy of Captain Marvel and telling Noh-Varr that he can choose to live as a hero or spend the rest of his life in the Cube. They ultimately leave him with the choice and tell him to earn his way out.

=== Civil War ===
Noh-Varr is brainwashed and ordered to capture the Runaways by S.H.I.E.L.D. director Maria Hill.

After being released for his mission by the cruel warden of the Cube, Noh-Varr brutally subdues the Runaways and the Young Avengers. When the warden of the Cube feels the mission has finished successfully, he orders Noh-Varr's retrieval. As the Young Avengers and the Runaways assault the Cube, he engages them in battle. After a brief fight, Noh-Varr is defeated and the Vision reverses the Cube's mental control over him. He is seen taking control of the Cube, declaring it to be the capital city of the new Kree Empire.

=== Secret Invasion ===
When the alien virus the Skrulls upload releases all the prisoners within the Cube, Noh-Varr announces that it is "time to go." Later, while escaping on a stolen S.H.I.E.L.D. minijet, he's stopped by a dying Khn'nr. At first mistaking him for the original Captain Marvel (Mar-Vell), Noh-Varr stops to listen to his final words, as Khn'nr appoints him as the new Protector of the Earth, spurring him to fill in the role once covered by Mar-Vell himself, and stop the Skrulls, perceived as liars and honorless beings. Noh-Varr is left shaken by the revelation, after witnessing the dying Khn'nr reverting to his alien Skrull appearance.

Finally deciding to take a side in the war, Noh-Varr uses the solar energies of Captain Marvel's Nega-Bands, causing a huge explosion in the middle of the battle in New York. Then he declares to the Skrull army that their invasion is over.

=== Dark Avengers ===
Noh-Varr is told by Norman Osborn that he is a war hero and he wants him to be who he truly is. He is recruited to Norman Osborn's Avengers team, and takes on the mantle of the new Captain Marvel.

When the Church of Hala branch in Charleston, South Carolina commit mass suicide due to Noh-Varr taking Captain Marvel's name, Carol Danvers goes to investigate. While looking around, she finds Noh-Varr in an alley behind the church. After Carol tries to attack Nor-Varr twice and blames him for what the church has done in the original Captain Marvel's name, he explains that the Captain Marvel they founded this church for was a Skrull and he died in his arms, claiming his love for this world and her people and asked he protect this world from those who wish to harm it. Carol does not believe it and Noh-Varr flies away, telling her to believe what she will and to remember this meeting, because he never threw a punch.

After their first mission Noh-Varr shows an attraction to teammate Ms. Marvel, which is noticed by teammate Ares, much to his amusement. The team then decide to relax in the Avengers Tower once they have returned. In the evening, Noh-Varr is walking back to his room from a shower, when Karla invites him into her room. After having sex with Noh-Varr, Karla turns on the television, telling him she wanted to see how Norman would explain why his "Avengers" are full of criminals. Noh-Varr is shocked at the news that the rest of his teammates are all criminals pretending to be heroes. He then goes missing.

=== Post-Dark Avengers ===
Since abandoning the team, Noh-Varr has kept a low profile to elude the Dark Avengers and has been trying to determine what his role is while he is living on Earth. In Dark Reign: The List - Wolverine, it is revealed that one of Noh-Varr's missions as a Dark Avenger was to capture the World facility. He goes to Wolverine and warns him of Osborn's plan and together, they take the World facility from Osborn's grasp, leaving it in the hands of Fantomex. Later, Noh-Varr befriends a young woman named Annie at the same time he is found by the Sentry, who has come to take him back to Osborn. A battle ensues in the middle of Manhattan with Noh-Varr on the verge of losing when Annie intervenes and fires on the Sentry with one of Noh-Varr's Kree weapons, distracting him. Noh-Varr flees and returns to an abandoned building where he has been building a Kree communicator to contact the Kree Supreme Intelligence.

In Dark Avengers Annual #1, a holographic message sent by the Supreme Intelligence tells Noh-Varr that the actions of the Skrulls during Secret Invasion have left Earth in more danger than ever before and that Noh-Varr is the planet's new protector. The Supreme Intelligence then grants him the power needed to carry out his mission in the form of a set of Nega-Bands, more advanced than the ones worn by Captain Marvel. The bands also provide him with a new costume and prevent the Dark Avengers from detecting his presence. After finding Annie and thanking her for her help, he teleports away. Unbeknown to Noh-Varr however, he was being observed by Captain America (Bucky) and Steve Rogers, who are trying to determine if he could be a potential ally against Osborn.

=== Aftermath ===
Noh-Varr as Protector in Dark Avengers Annual #1. Art by Chris Bachalo

Noh-Varr later appears as the new costumed hero, Protector, in the back matter of Ms. Marvel (vol. 2) #50. Taking place after an undefined amount of time after the events of Dark Avengers Annual #1, Noh-Varr and Annie are seen traveling together. An unidentified female, wearing hi-tech battle armor, from the future has located Noh-Varr and time slips in to "test" Noh-Varr. Noh-Varr transforms into the Protector and battles the female. The female realizes she has met a younger and weaker Protector than expected and before killing the civilians is knocked aside by Protector. The now unmasked assailant is revealed to be an older Annie, telling Noh-Varr "it will all make sense... someday" before locking onto another Noh-Varr and time slipping out.

=== Heroic Age ===
Noh-Varr is recruited into the Avengers team to help them build a time machine to save the future. Tony Stark attempts to hire him due to his vast knowledge to 'unleash his alien mind onto the world', which Noh-Varr turns down, having vowed to keep the secrets of Kree technology out of the economy of Earth. Within a short time, Noh-Varr creates a time-space continuum viewer which allows the Avengers to view myriad possible futures, including MC2, Marvel 2099, Days of Future Past and Age of Apocalypse, before seeing the timestream collapse. Noh-Varr then helps the Avengers fight off an angry Wonder Man, who is convinced the reformation of Avengers is a mistake. Shortly afterwards, they are then attacked by a time-lost future Apocalypse and his four horsemen, which consists of corrupted heroes including the Scarlet Witch, Spider-Man, and Wolverine. In the aftermath, Noh-Varr manages to calm down Spider-Man, who is bemoaning his possible future, with a joke before he heads off with some of the team to build a new time machine. Having traveled to the future with Wolverine, Captain America, and Iron Man, they are promptly defeated by a possible future team of Avengers, and taken to their leader Maestro, who is happy to see them, as he is working with a future version of Tony Stark.

=== Fear Itself ===
During the Fear Itself storyline, Noh-Varr arrives in Brazil with Spider-Woman and Ms. Marvel to help Red She-Hulk fight the Hulk, who was transformed into Nul: Breaker of Worlds.

=== Avengers vs. X-Men ===
During the Avengers vs. X-Men storyline, Noh-Varr locates a secret A.I.M. base. The Avengers assemble where they take out the base and arrest Monica Rappaccini and the rest of the A.I.M. scientists that escaped following Osborn's defeat. After the battle, Noh-Varr checks in with the Supreme Intelligence of the Kree Empire, who informs him of the coming Phoenix force and orders him to intercept and contain it at all cost... even if that means eliminating his Avenger teammates. In space, after the Avengers fail to stop the Phoenix, Noh-Varr analyzes the reason for their failure and discovers that Thor's Mjolnir hammer can injure and absorb the Phoenix' essence. Before the team can celebrate, Noh-Varr declares that he will take the collected energy back to the Kree. While the Avengers wake up in their spaceship heading to a sun and try to escape death, Noh-Varr takes the Phoenix energy to the Supreme Intelligence. However, the Supreme Intelligence declares that the energy will not be used to save Earth. Noh-Varr turns against the Supreme Intelligence and escapes with the energy. The Avengers meet him, take the energy, and declare him an enemy of the team telling him never to return to Earth. Noh-Varr is left in Hala running for his life from the Kree.

=== Marvel NOW! ===
Marvel Boy and Kate Bishop in Young Avengers Vol.2 Art by Jamie McKelvie.

Noh-Varr later appears in the Young Avengers series as part of Marvel Now!, where he reconciles with the team with whom he clashed during Civil War: Young Avengers/Runaways. Rather than fleeing Earth, he established a base in a satellite orbiting Earth where he regains his identity as Marvel Boy and begins a relationship with Hawkeye. Throughout the series, he struggles to fully assimilate into Earth culture, though his knowledge of alien technology such as a pair of energy guns he wields during battle and the laser bow he gives to Hawkeye give a significant advantage. His spaceship serves as the team's primary source of transport. Noh-Varr is depicted as being fascinated by Earth music including pop, rock and country (which inspires him to briefly grow a beard similar to that of Kenny Rogers), however, he frequently describes his favourite track as "Be My Baby" by R&B trio The Ronettes. Marvel Boy officially joins the Young Avengers when he is asked by Hawkeye to help her and her teammates face the interdimensional parasite known as Mother. His relationship with Hawkeye is questioned when it is revealed that Loki's former associate Leah, who is working for Mother, has recruited three of his former lovers, Merree, Oubliette and Annie, to serve on her superpowered team. Noh-Varr decides to break up with Hawkeye to be with Oubilette but, when Leah's team are revealed to be nothing but guilt-based constructs, Marvel Boy tries to unsuccessfully win Kate back. After defeating Mother once and for all, Noh-Varr DJ's at the party held by Loki in the Young Avengers' honor. At the party, he attempts to reconcile with Hawkeye but she denies him the chance to end things on good terms, leaving him to conclude that he must stop dwelling on the past so that he can move forward.

Rededicating himself to heroism, Noh-Varr sets his sights on rebuilding the Kree empire, offering his services to the Inhuman Royal Family. He takes them to the ruins of Hala, predicting that investigating the origins of the Inhuman species may provide a way for them to survive following the destruction of the Terrigen Mist. During their quest, the team are attacked by Ronan the Accuser who uses his advanced technology to create a psychic projection of Hawkeye, who berates Noh-Varr for throwing their love away for Oubilette, a girl who never existed. He apologises to her and admits that he did not trust his own heart enough to believe that she really wanted to be with him. When she further insults him, Noh realises that he has been trapped by Ronan and uses his own technology to escape. Noh-Varr stays with the Inhumans and is nearly killed by a Progenitor but is able to heal thanks to his cockroach-infused DNA and remains with the Royal Family in Artican, their new base located on the Moon.

Noh-Varr later joins the Guardians of the Galaxy. He is in a relationship with fellow Guardian Hercules.

In the aftermath of the "Empyre" storyline, Noh-Varr represents the Kree when Super-Skrull meets with Nova and the representatives of the Badoon, the Kymellians, the Zn'rx, the Shi'ar, the Spartaxians, the Chitauri, and an alien from the planet Silnius. When Noh-Varr heads to the restroom, he finds Emperor Stote of the Zn'rx dying on the ground mentioning about a shapeshifter. The Skrull Subaltern Val-Korr accuses him of murder, causing Noh-Varr to act in self-defense. Super-Skrull brings up Noh-Varr's actions to the rest of the Galactic Council as Nova calls the Guardians of the Galaxy to investigate Stote's murder.

== Powers and abilities ==
Noh-Varr is a Kree from an alternate universe who has been enhanced with insect DNA. He has demonstrated enhanced reflexes, speed, strength, and endurance well beyond that capable of a normal human and standard Kree. He can re-route his neurological impulses so that he can avoid experiencing physical pain and even suppress any stimulus he does not want to experience, making him a deadly opponent in battle. In Civil War: Young Avengers/Runaways he performs a "White run", pushing everything unrelated to the fight from his mind, allowing him to defeat Xavin, Karolina Dean, Wiccan, and Hulkling within five seconds.

In addition, Noh-Varr is "triple jointed", allowing extreme feats of contortion and the ability to survive what would otherwise be crushing forces. Noh-Varr can also scale even the smoothest surfaces, including vertical walls, glass windows, and ceilings. Noh-Varr is also capable of escape velocity aerial travel unaided by boost propulsion under his own power, he can also emit energy blasts from his hands at will.

When needed, he can digest any organic substance without adverse effects. As a result, he can eat rotting or poisonous food as well as non-food stuffs (e.g., cardboard, paper, etc.). He uses this ability to recover from wounds or extreme stress.

Noh-Varr's saliva contains nano-active properties that infects the bodies and minds of those it touches. This causes hallucinations and allows Noh-Varr a degree of psyche-control. His fingernails can grow into a deadly crystalline spike. Noh-Varr can insert this nail into an opponent and leave it to explode, killing the target as well as causing extensive damage to the surrounding area, or break off and fling his nails as a ranged attack. They also have toxic effects depending upon Noh-Varr's inclination. Marvel Boy also seems capable of flight under his own power, as well as possessing self-sustenance. being able to survive in space without physical nourishment.

Marvel Boy later showcased hand emitted concussion blasts of an unknown energy type while battling Vox Supreme's gene patterned drones.

In Dark Avengers Annual #1, Noh-Varr makes contact with his people and is given a pair of Nega-Bands of his own along with a new costume and entirely new abilities. These include technopathy, apparatus conjuration, teleportation, and computerized holographic interact, plus a number of in-universe Band functions pertaining to flight, physical enhancement and energy manipulation. They are later taken away after his last mission with the New Avengers for betraying the prime universe's Supreme Intelligence.

Noh-Varr has access to a wide variety of advanced Kree technology, including high-tech weaponry such as self-replicating grenades, plasma guns, shapeshifting armbands called Nega-Gauntlets which turn into razor blades, hand cannons channelling varied energy types and can initiate trans-matter displacement with other gauntlet wearers. Along with imagination-powered space ships and a "pocket battlefield" that can simulate unique combat environments for the user by adjusting local physics.

Noh-Varr is adept at the sciences of interdimensional and extra-dimensional travel. He can construct and operate devices to view and traverse the timestream and alternate dimensions.

== Reception ==
=== Critical reception ===
Andrew Wheeler of ComicsAlliance referred to Noh-Varr as "Marvel's first male pin-up." Lauren Davis of Gizmodo called Noh-Varr one of the "male superheroes who truly are sexualized the way women are in comics," saying, "Now this is a great example of a character being portrayed as sexy in a fun and sweet way that doesn't overwhelm the scene. In Kieron Gillen and Jamie McKelvie's Young Avengers #1, we see Kate Bishop watching Noh-Varr dance in her room. It's her gaze that's on him, and some readers can appreciate Noh-Varr in the same way that Kate does, but at the same time, it's a nice character moment. And it's much sexier than running one's hands down an unwilling Batman's chest." Afreen Khan of Sportskeeda dubbed Noh-Varr as an "outright sex symbol," stating, "Noh-Varr, in simpler terms, is a hunk. He is a part of the Marvels and goes by many aliases. The most popular ones are Marvel Boy and Protector. The superhero was introduced in the self-titled 2000 comic. As one of the many younger superheroes, he was also a part of the Young Avengers. [...] That's not all. One of the main reasons the post about Park Seo-joon reprising Noh-Varr has gained so much attention is because of the hero's sexual orientation. The Young Avenger is canonically bisexual, or pansexual. [...] Social media was bombarded with excited fans' reactions after the Twitter account of Marvel Updates posted that the actor would be playing Noh-Varr. A major reason for it is that the queer superhero is one of the few comic characters who was explicitly portrayed as a s*x symbol, in a good way. " Benjamin Riley of Special Broadcasting Service described Noh-Varr was one of the "queer superheroes who changed the face of comics," asserting, "This one's cheating a bit—Marvel Boy's status as a queer character is debatable, but aside from being one of the hottest male superheroes in recent memory, the alien Noh-Varr (his real name) certainly has a queer sensibility. He's also another Young Avengers alum—Marvel Boy's teammate and sometime girlfriend Kate Bishop jokes at one point that she's the only "straightie" on the team. What makes Marvel Boy queer isn't just his sexuality (he implies his race doesn't have sexual identities, only sexual acts) it's how the comic treats him, visually: in a medium dominated by the male gaze, he's not only sexy, he's sexualized."

Noh-Varr has received significant discussion in scholarly literature such as Lyubansky, Sweeney, and Beam & Clay-Buck.

=== Accolades ===
- In 2013, ComicsAlliance ranked Noh-Varr 2nd in their "50 Sexiest Male Characters in Comics" list.
- In 2014, Gizmodo ranked Noh-Varr 9th in their "10 Times When Comics And Movies Sexualized Male Superheroes" list.
- In 2016, Special Broadcasting Service included Noh-Varr in their "10 queer superheroes who changed the face of comics" list.
- In 2018, Comic Book Resources (CBR) ranked Noh-Varr 7th in their "Every Captain Marvel Ever" list.
- In 2019, CBR ranked Noh-Varr 5th in their "All The Captain Marvels" list and 5th in their "Every Single Young Avenger Ever" list.
- In 2021, Screen Rant ranked Noh-Varr 5th in their "10 Most Powerful Members Of The Young Avengers" list and 5th in their "10 LGBTQ+ Marvel Heroes That Should Join The MCU" list.
- In 2021, CBR ranked Noh-Varr 10th in their "10 Most Powerful Young Avengers" list.
- In 2022, Screen Rant ranked Noh-Varr 15th in their "15 Most Powerful Guardians Of The Galaxy Members In The Comics" list and included him in their "10 Best Hercules Love Interests In Marvel Comics" list.

== Literary reception ==
=== Volumes ===
==== Marvel Boy (2000) ====
According to Diamond Comic Distributors, Marvel Boy #1 was the 21st best selling comic book in June 2000. Marvel Boy #2 was the 50th best selling comic book in July 2000.

Tom Spurgeon of The Comics Reporter called Marvel Boy #1 a "refreshingly goofy take on superhero source material," saying, "Morrison displays uncharacteristic restraint in Marvel Boy. The overriding emphasis seems to be on making certain everything works first as a comic book adventure story rather than as an idea virus, magic spell, pop culture cluster bomb, or whatever grandiloquent description writers like Morrison use for comics that goose superhero formulae with a formal twist and one or two declarations about the state of reality. By making less obvious the stabs at relevance and deeper meaning, particularly those he sometimes attempts through sentiment and affectation, Morrison with Marvel Boy hewed closer to the Lee/Kirby model of superhero storytelling than anything he had done to date. It is a good fit. What the series resembles most closely is the later, Kirby-dominated and slightly tossed-off seeming issues of Fantastic Four. Like Kirby, Morrison focuses on the weirdness of the superhero concept itself, leaving many of the out-there science fiction ideas, the bizarre combat technologies and hints of radical, identity-focused politics, to sizzle at the perimeter of the page." David Harth of CBR.com ranked the Marvel Boy comic book series 6th in their "10 Marvel Comics That Read Like Sci-Fi Epics" list, asserting, "Grant Morrison's time at Marvel was short and tumultuous, but they produced brilliant tales. Their opening salvo was Marvel Boy, with artist J. G. Jones. Following the genetically engineered alternate reality soldier Noh-Varr on a quest for revenge, Morrison and Jones created a sci-fi superhero epic like nothing else at Marvel. With all it has to offer, Marvel Boy should be Marvel's next big sci-fi superhero movie. It's a sci-fi revenge tale full of big concepts, breathtaking action, and brilliant characters, turning the Marvel sci-fi story formula on its ear." Rosie Knight of Nerdist included the Marvel Boy comic book series in their "8 Must-Read Marvel Knights Stories" list.

== In other media ==
- Noh-Varr appears as a playable character in Marvel Avengers Academy, voiced by Andy Field.
- Noh-Varr / Protector appears as a playable character in Lego Marvel's Avengers.

== Collected editions ==
Title	Material collected	Published date	ISBN
Marvel Boy	Marvel Boy (vol. 2) #1-6	July 2001	978-0785107811
