= Jim Cheung =

British comic book artist (born 1972)

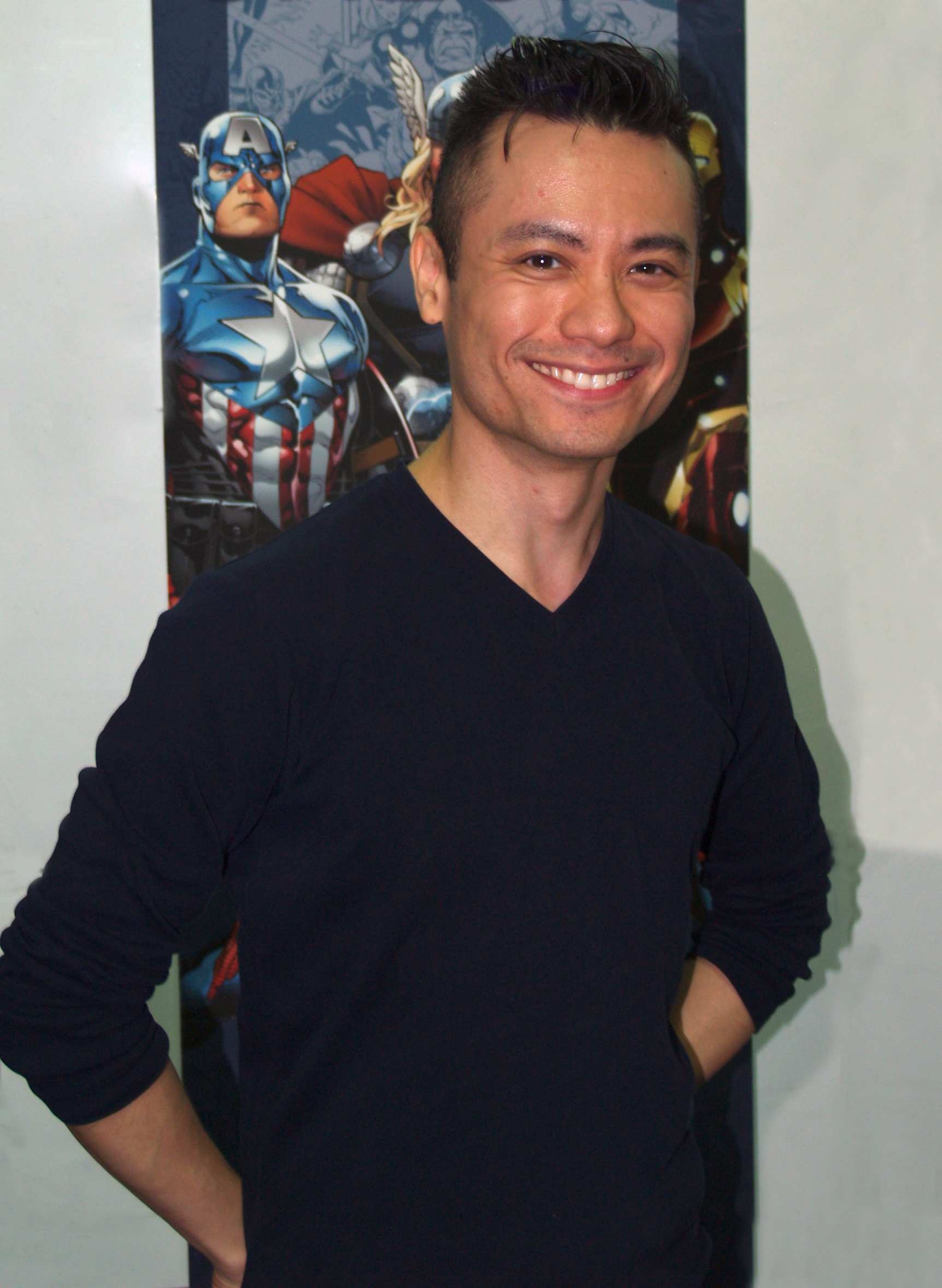
- Cheung at the 2016 New York Comic Con
- Born: 1972 (age 53–54)
- Area: Penciller

Jim Cheung (/tʃʌŋ/ CHUNG; born 1972) is a British comic book artist, known for his work on the series such as Scion, New Avengers: Illuminati, Young Avengers and Avengers: The Children's Crusade.

He co-created the Marvel Comics superhero team the Young Avengers, including its members: Kate Bishop, Hulkling, Iron Lad, Patriot (Eli Bradley), Speed, and Wiccan.

== Career ==
Cheung worked on several Marvel series during the mid- to late 1990s. He also worked on Scion for Crossgen Comics in the early 2000s. He later returned to Marvel, where he illustrated the five-issue New Avengers: Illuminati mini-series for Marvel Comics, and then pencilled two more issues of New Avengers. He was named in August 2005 as one of Marvel's "Young Guns", a group of artists that, according to Marvel Editor-in-Chief Joe Quesada, have the qualities that make "a future superstar penciller". Other "Young Guns" include Olivier Coipel, David Finch, Trevor Hairsine, Adi Granov and Steve McNiven. Cheung illustrated the 2010-2012 miniseries Avengers: The Children's Crusade. In addition to interior comics work, he has drawn several covers including those of "Avengers vs. X-Men", "Spider-Men" and the Young Avengers.

In 2015, Marvel enlisted Cheung to create an Agents of S.H.I.E.L.D. poster for a panel devoted to that TV series at that year's San Diego Comic-Con. He drew the Dead No More: The Clone Conspiracy limited series in 2016 with writer Christos Gage and Dan Slott.

In February 2018, Cheung created promo art for a relaunched Marvel Universe, called the Fresh Start. That March, it was announced that Cheung would be the artist on a relaunched Justice League series.

== Bibliography ==
=== Marvel Comics ===
==== Interior work ====
- Avengers #35 (2014)
- Avengers Finale
- Avengers: The Children's Crusade #1-9
- Avengers & X-Men: AXIS #9 (select pages)
- Black Knight: Exodus #1
- Civil War II Free Comic Book Day
- The Clone Conspiracy #1-5 (2016)
- Elektra: The Hand #1, #5 (select pages)
- Force Works #15-17
- Giant-Sized Avengers Special #1 (2007)
- Infinity #1, #6 (2013)
- Iron Man #325-327, 329-330, 600
- Marvel Comics Presents #170
- Marvel Comics Presents #1-12
- Marvel 2-in-One #1-2, #6
- New Avengers #25, 40, 42, 43
- New Avengers: Illuminati #1-5
- Maverick #1-11
- Original Sin #0 (2014)
- Spider-Man Unlimited #6
- Uncanny X-Men #371
- X-Force #82-84, 86–88, 90, 94–95, 98-100
- X-Men Unlimited #14 (1997)
- Young Avengers #1-6, 9-12

==== Covers ====
- A-Force #1
- Astonishing X-Men #1
- Avengers #82
- Avengers: The Initiative #1-5, Annual #1
- Avengers vs. X-Men #1-12
- Avengers & X-Men: AXIS #1-9
- Cable #73
- Casualties of War: Captain America/Iron Man (one-shot)
- Civil War: Young Avengers/Runaways #1-4
- Civil War: Casualties of War: Iron Man/Captain America (one-shot)
- Darth Vader #1-2
- Fantastic Four #525-526
- Fantastic Four: Foes #1-5
- Hulk vs Fin Fang Foom (one-shot)
- New Avengers: Illuminati #1-5
- Iron Fist (vol 6) #1, #2-3 (variants)
- Iron Man #322-324, 327-330
- Iron Man: Director of SHIELD Annual #1
- Marvel 2-in-One #3 (2017)
- New Avengers #4 (variant), Annual #2
- New Avengers/Transformers #1
- Secret Warriors #1-22
- Shang-Chi #1
- Shang-Chi: Master of the Ten Rings (one-shot)
- Spider-Men #1-5
- Ultimate Nightmare #5
- Uncanny X-Men #493 (variant)
- What If...Magneto and Professor X Had Formed the X-Men Together? (one-shot)
- What If... House of M #1
- World War Hulk Aftersmash: Warbound #1-5
- X-Factor (vol 3) #27 (variant)
- X-Force #101
- X-Men #207 (variant)
- Young Avengers #1-12
- Young Avengers Special #1
- Young Avengers Presents #1-6

=== DC Comics ===
- Justice League vol. 4 #1, 7, 14-17 (2018-2019)
- DC's Year Of The Villain #1 (2019)
- Legion Of Super-Heroes: Millenium #2 (2019)

=== CrossGen Comics ===
- Scion #1-6, 8–11, 13–16, 18–21, 23–26, 31–32, 35–36, 38-39

=== Village Voice ===
- Kill Bill (October 1–7, 2003) (vol XLVII NO.40)

=== Bubble Comics ===
- Time of the Raven #5
