= Illuminati (comics) =

Comic book superhero team

- Prominent members of the Illuminati (clockwise from left to right): Iron Man, Black Bolt, Doctor Strange, Mister Fantastic, Namor the Sub-Mariner and Professor X in artwork for the cover of New Avengers: Illuminati Vol 2 #1 (Feb, 2007). Art by Jimmy Cheung

Publication information
- Publisher: Marvel Comics
- First appearance: New Avengers #7 (July 2005)
- Created by: Brian Michael Bendis (writer); Steve McNiven (artist)

In-story information
- Base(s): Mobile
- Member(s): Beast; Black Bolt; Black Panther; Blue Marvel; Captain America; Captain Britain; Doctor Strange; Hulk; Iron Man; Mastermind Excello; Medusa; Mister Fantastic; Namor; Professor X White Queen; Yellowjacket

The Illuminati are a secret society group of superheroes appearing in American comic books published by Marvel Comics. The characters joined forces and secretly work behind the scenes. The Illuminati was established to exist (via story retcon) in their first published appearance in New Avengers #7 (July 2005), written by Brian Michael Bendis. Their history was discussed in the special New Avengers: Illuminati (May 2006). The group was revealed to have been formed shortly after the Kree–Skrull War.

An alternate version of the Illuminati appeared in the Marvel Cinematic Universe film Doctor Strange in the Multiverse of Madness.

== Members ==
Creator Bendis says of the group's members:

They each represent a certain something that is very special to the Marvel Universe:

- Namor is a King of the Atlantis and the Seven Oceans and represents the antihero mindset.
- Tony Stark represents the Avenger type of hero, one who understands and appreciates that a hero can work with the government, rather than outside of it. He also represents the common human, as he possesses no natural superhuman abilities.
- Mister Fantastic: Leader of Fantastic Four. Represents the science-based part of the superhero community.
- Black Bolt: King of Inhumans, who are an important part of Marvel history and play an important part in events that have not yet come to pass. He also represents a ruler/king archetype, one that has also been filled by Namor.
- Doctor Stephen Strange: Sorcerer Supreme of Earth. Speaks for the mystical/non-scientific side of the Marvel universe.
- Professor Charles Xavier: Leader of the X-Men is there on behalf of the mutant community.

They all bring with them a unique viewpoint and perspective that isn't shared by the others.

The group forms at some time in the aftermath of the Kree-Skrull War, and probably after the Avengers/Defenders war. Iron Man realizes that each of the individual members had information about these alien races beforehand, and they could have collectively stopped it. He brings together the Illuminati with Black Panther in Wakanda, and proposes that they form a government of superhumans. Namor refuses on the grounds that too many superheroes are violent outsiders (such as Hawkeye and Quicksilver, both former criminals). Xavier refuses on the grounds that mutants are already feared and hated, and if Iron Man thinks he can fight this with iconic superheroes, it will result in heroes being feared and hated as much as mutants. Doctor Strange refuses on the grounds that too many heroes are anti-establishment and that the group Iron Man has assembled to form a governing body would not be 'anti-establishment', but rather a form of 'counter-establishment'. Reed Richards refuses on the grounds that such an organization would be too large to run effectively, that the heroes would spend more time dealing with bureaucracy than actually helping people. The group does, however, agree to meet to exchange information regularly. The only individual present who outright refuses to meet or even participate with the others is Black Panther, who fears the association will end in less than altruistic actions.

== Publication history ==
The Illuminati first appeared in the Sentry story arc of New Avengers, written by Brian Michael Bendis. Bendis explored their history in the New Avengers: Illuminati one-shot (May 2006), which built up to the "Civil War" event that summer.

Bendis, along with co-writer Brian Reed and artist Jim Cheung, produced a five-issue miniseries filling out what the group does behind the scenes between their formation and dissolution. The first issue of The New Avengers: Illuminati was released in December 2006 and the final issue was released in November 2007.

=== New Avengers (2013–2015) ===
As part of Marvel NOW!, New Avengers was relaunched featuring the Illuminati.

=== Illuminati (2015–2016) ===
Following Secret Wars, a new Illuminati series was launched by writer Joshua Williamson. The book features the Hood leading a new, villainous incarnation of the group. The new Illuminati includes Titania, Enchantress, Mad Thinker, Thunderball, and Black Ant.

== Fictional group history ==
=== First meeting ===
Iron Man (representing the Avengers), Mister Fantastic (representing the Fantastic Four), Namor (representing Atlantis), Black Bolt (representing the Inhumans), Professor Xavier (representing the X-Men), Black Panther (representing Wakanda) and Doctor Strange (Sorcerer Supreme of Earth) meet in Wakanda, in the aftermath of the Kree-Skrull War that ravaged Earth. Iron Man highlights the fact that numerous heroes possessed information that could have prevented the war had they been combined, as well as the fact that Earth's heroes are the only defence against an attack on that scale. From this, he concludes that a representative body, similar to the United Nations, be established amongst the heroes. The others in attendance debate the effectiveness of such a body, pointing out issues of trust amongst heroes and the bureaucracy that would result; however, most agree that continued secret meetings such as this one could help deal with larger threats in the future. All agree to this except Black Panther, who takes issue with their self-righteous attitudes and predicts disaster when they disagree.

=== Skrull Empire ===
The Illuminati travel to the homeworld of the Skrulls, who are still reeling from their defeat during the Kree-Skrull War on Earth. The group warns the Empire not to attack Earth again, but is unable to escape afterwards. The Skrulls analyze their captives and glean information from their behavior, until Iron Man is able to lead an escape. The Illuminati recognize that another attack is inevitable, while the Skrull Empire uses the data they compiled to avoid detection.

=== Battle with the Pride ===
When Tony Stark relocates to Los Angeles after Obadiah Stane takes over his company, the other Illuminati members leave him alone after Namor points out that Stark would never accept charity and needed this time to prove himself worthy of his membership. While establishing a new company, Stark encounters the Pride – the six families who controlled crime in the city – and learn about the Gibborim that they worshipped, prompting him to contact Doctor Strange for information about the Gibborim. This leads to a brief fight between the Illuminati and the Pride. Stark leaves Los Angeles after leaving the Pride a warning that he would be back if he had any reason to suspect that they were acting against his new company.

=== Beyonder ===
During the opening moments of the first "Secret Wars," Professor X and Mister Fantastic unsuccessfully attempted rendering the abducted heroes and villains forced to participate in Secret Wars unconscious using Professor X's powers of telepathy. The rationale behind their failed plan was that doing so would deny the Beyonder the pleasure of watching the two sides fight solely for his entertainment. The issue also contends that the Illuminati confronted the Beyonder during the events of "Secret Wars II".

=== Marvel Boy ===
The Illuminati approach Noh-Varr, a Kree warrior who tried to take over the Earth, in his prison, reasoning that it is better to convince him to change on his own rather than to just try to make him change using their abilities. They demonstrate the Kree connection to the Inhumans, and their desire to protect Earth. They demonstrate the primitive nature of humanity, but also the potential of the race to evolve and better itself. Ultimately, using Captain Marvel (a deceased, Kree-born superhero), they try to convince Noh-Varr to use his powers to protect the Earth and guide humans to better themselves.

=== Sentry ===
Iron Man informs the Illuminati of the formation of a new Avengers team in light of the breakout from the Raft. All but Namor wish him well in his endeavor, and Iron Man moves on to the issue of the Sentry. Although none of the Illuminati have any recollection of him, Mr. Fantastic discovers that he has files on the Sentry and Professor X discovers that his mind has been tampered with. Mr. Fantastic is able to use the files to get through to Sentry and help him reverse what has been done to him. Iron Man tells the group that the Avengers take full responsibility for the Sentry, should he ever lose control, but dodges their questions about other recent Avengers inquiries.

=== Dealing with Hulk ===
Maria Hill, director of S.H.I.E.L.D., approaches Iron Man concerning the Hulk, who has recently destroyed Las Vegas. Iron Man presents a solution to the problem of the Hulk to the Illuminati (excluding an absent Professor X), suggesting that they shoot him into space toward an uninhabited world. Alone, Namor dissents to the plan from the outset. He argues that they have no right to banish their ally from Earth and accuses them of not helping to cure Bruce Banner to the best of their abilities. The other four members vote in favor of the plan, and Namor departs after a brief skirmish with Iron Man. While leaving, he says that Black Panther was correct and Namor predicts that the Hulk will eventually return to seek justified revenge.

=== Registration and the road to Civil War ===
Despite deciding not to meet again, Iron Man calls together the Illuminati (excluding Professor X, who is in exile in Scotland after the "M Day" event) to introduce them to the Superhuman Registration Act. He illustrates the fact that recent events have raised suspicion of all super-powered individuals and groups, and that one wrong move on the part of a hero will trigger disaster.

A hero, probably a young one... One of the Young Avengers, or those kids in Los Angeles... Some carefree happy go-lucky, well-meaning young person with the best of intentions will do something wrong. He will be trying to save someone do something heroic but he will make a mistake. Turn to the left instead of the right and people will be hurt or killed because of it. And it will happen on live TV, or it will be recorded... and like Rodney King, it will play over and over. All over the world. Until the unrest that is already bubbling over will boil over... and every politician looking to make a name for himself will run right on TV and they will tell America how they are going to save the world from these out-of-control costumed characters who think the law does not apply to them. And half of us will go along with it and half of us will not. And because of this mini-rebellion, our lawmakers will be forced to make an example of someone. Someone like our friend Spider-Man. Someone they can make a real spectacle of. Someone they can unmask on TV, destroy his marriage and family and pin a crime or two on! All for the whole world to see. And the country will rupture. Sides will be taken and people will be hurt. Friend against friend. People who used to be adversaries finding themselves teamed up against a common cause. Friends dying at the hands of a former ally or teammate. That is what will happen.

If the Act passes, a war amongst heroes will result and cause untold damage. In order to avoid it, Iron Man reiterates his idea of a representative body of superheroes, and urges the group to come out in favor of registration prior to a disaster. While Namor dismisses the issue as none of Atlantis' business and Doctor Strange and Black Bolt disagree on principle, Mr. Fantastic agrees with Tony. The damage is done, however, and the Illuminati dissolve.

=== Infinity Gauntlet ===
Mister Fantastic reveals to the group that he has been collecting the Infinity Gems, and hopes to collect them all with the help of the Illuminati. Despite a general apprehension, the group manages to acquire all six gems. When the Gems are assembled, Mister Fantastic attempts to will the Gems out of existence, but he is unable to do so. Faced with this failure and a reprimand from Uatu the Watcher, he decides to give each Illuminati member one gem for safekeeping.

=== Civil War ===
Although the Illuminati never met or operated as a group during Civil War, their actions in the conflict reflect their reactions at the last meeting. Iron Man and Mr. Fantastic became two of the leading members of the pro-registration side, and worked closely with the United States government and S.H.I.E.L.D. Doctor Strange stayed out of the conflict, meditating and fasting, though he later admits, after joining the New Avengers and finding new love, that he regrets his lack of involvement. Afterward, he would join the New Avengers, who continue to operate underground without registering. Black Bolt and the Inhumans stayed out of the conflict, but began their own Cold War with the United States. Namor was involved only so far as it served his interests. This included avenging the death of his cousin Namorita and coming to the aid of his friend Captain America's forces in the final battle. Professor X was not on Earth during the conflict.

=== World War Hulk ===
Reed is contacted by Amadeus Cho, who informs him that Hulk did not land on the intended planet. The Hulk returns to Earth, seeking revenge on the Illuminati following the destruction of Sakaar and the death of his wife Caiera. Hulk sends a transmission to hand over Doctor Strange, Iron Man, and Mister Fantastic to him while giving the citizens of New York City time to evacuate. After providing New York with a twenty-four-hour time limit to hand the other three Illuminati over to him, the Hulk approaches Professor X at the X-Mansion to determine whether he would have supported the Illuminati plan had he been present. After scanning Hulk's mind, Professor X confirms that he would have agreed with the plan, but only until a method could be found to prevent the Hulk endangering others. After learning of the mutant population's recent severe losses as a result of "M-Day" from Mercury, the Hulk decides that the X-Men have suffered enough and departs. Having then taken over Manhattan Island, the Hulk is attacked by Iron Man in a new 'Hulkbuster' armor, only for him to be defeated and Stark Tower to be destroyed. Despite the aid of the other members of the Fantastic Four, including temporary members Black Panther and Storm, the same fate befalls Mister Fantastic. Doctor Strange tries to enter the Hulk's mind, but Hulk tricks Strange into presenting himself in a physical form that he attacks upon appearance. Strange later invokes and is possessed by Zom, hoping that he could stop the Hulk before it was too late. However, he loses control of his newfound power, and he almost caused some civilians to die during his battle with the Hulk. Although the Hulk saves them, this action makes Strange lose his confidence in his powers and makes him vulnerable for the Hulk to defeat him.

Hulk implants the Illuminati members with obedience discs and forces them to fight each other in his makeshift gladiatorial ring in Madison Square Garden. However, the Hulk spared them from killing each other, showing them that he proved his point to the world. They survived the encounter by Hulk's mercy and the timely intervention of the Sentry which leads to a prolonged battle where both Hulk and the Sentry reverse back to their human forms and Bruce Banner knocks out Robert Reynolds with a final punch. This allows enough time for Stark to use prototype defense satellites to negate the Hulk's powers.

=== Secret Invasion ===
Iron Man calls the Illuminati together one more time to show them the body of the Skrull who was posing as Elektra. He feels that the Skrull represents a secret invasion of Earth, and that the group is responsible (after traveling to the Skrull homeworld years before). His suspicions are proven to be correct when Black Bolt reveals himself to be a disguised Skrull. The five remaining members are able to barely defeat it, and its two compatriots, and begin making plans to detect and defeat the remaining Skrulls. They soon realize that this is pointless, as they cannot trust each other, going each his own way, for better or for worse, upon realizing that they have lost far more than just a world: they have lost each other's trust, and have lost the last hope of uniting the superheroes against the Skrulls. However, Iron Man and Mister Fantastic remain involved in the fight against the Skrulls.

=== Quest of the Hood ===
The Illuminati reunites with founding members Iron Man, Mister Fantastic, Doctor Strange and Professor X returning. Medusa has joined the group as well after learning that the Hood is targeting them for the Infinity Gems, seeking to reform the Infinity Gauntlet and regain his lost power. With the Hood having been defeated once more, the Infinity Gems are re-divided among the Illuminati members, with Captain America in possession of the sixth gem in Black Bolt's absence.

=== Aborted reunion ===
Captain America arranges another meeting of the Illuminati during the war between the Avengers and the X-Men in an attempt to talk with Namor after he is possessed by the Phoenix Force, but the meeting quickly falls apart; Professor X resents how the other four members were subconsciously blaming him for the current mess, Mister Fantastic feels that the Phoenix Five were not actually doing anything wrong as their actions had all been fundamentally beneficial, and Doctor Strange and Tony Stark feel that the meeting was pointless as they doubted that Namor would appear. When Namor arrives after the others had left, Captain America asks him to stand down, but Namor refuses.

=== Colliding universes ===
When Black Panther discovers a threat to the entire Marvel Universe, he reassembles the Illuminati, including Black Bolt and Beast, to deal with the threat. Professor X is not part of the call, having been killed by Cyclops at the end of the war between the Avengers and the X-Men.

When Captain America attempts to use the Infinity Gauntlet to push a colliding planet back, the Infinity Gems are destroyed, with the exception of the Time Gem, which vanishes. Afterwards, Captain America argues that the Illuminati are wrong to consider building a world-destroying weapon to help save Earth, and that doing so will corrupt them. Iron Man has already anticipated that Captain America will respond in that way, and therefore Doctor Strange has prepared a spell that he uses to wipe Captain America's mind of the Illuminati meeting.

During the "Original Sin" storyline, following the murder of Uatu the Watcher, Captain America's exposure to Uatu's eye restores his memory. After Captain America and the Avengers are transported into the future realities with the Time Gem, Captain America announces that the Illuminati are to be arrested.

=== Time Runs Out and Secret Wars ===
Later, the Illuminati face off against the Great Society, a team of heroes from the latest parallel Earth that involved in an Incursion. Black Panther initially intends to destroy the Great Society's world by using an antimatter bomb, but relents at the last minute after realizing he cannot commit mass murder. However, Namor steals the trigger from Black Panther, and destroys the planet himself, resulting in his expulsion from the group. It is later revealed that Namor has partnered with a group of villains to form a new Cabal in order to destroy parallel worlds that may become involved in Incursions, which will destroy universes.

When the final incursion occurs during the Secret Wars storyline, resulting in all realities collapsing into one Earth, Mister Fantastic and Black Panther survive the incursion in a specially designed 'life pod' along with a few other heroes, while Strange comes through the incursion while assuming a role as Doctor Doom's 'sheriff', aiding Doom in ruling the new 'Battleworld' created from the multiple realities. Meanwhile, Namor survived with the Cabal and the Maker when they escaped the Ultimate Marvel universe during the final incursion. Once the two groups were awoken on Battleworld, faced with the threat of Doom, Namor and Black Panther put aside their past issues to work together and gather weapons to oppose the god-level Doom after Strange sacrificed his life to send the heroes to safety. While Reed researched the source of Doom's power, Namor and T'Challa followed clues left by Strange to reassemble the Infinity Gauntlet (Strange having manipulated events so that Doom's castle was built in the one area where a complete set of Infinity Gems still existed), which T'Challa wields against Doom in the final battle while Reed Richards finds a way to disrupt Doom's power and take it for himself to rebuild the multiverse.

== Cabal ==
The Cabal was a more villainous and antiheroic counterpart of the Illuminati consisting of the supervillains and anti-heroes Norman Osborn, Doctor Doom, Hood, Loki, Emma Frost, Magneto, and Namor.

Namor later forms a second incarnation of the Cabal to combat incursions, with the group consisting of Thanos, Maximus, Terrax, Black Swan, and Black Order members Corvus Glaive and Proxima Midnight.

== Hood's Illuminati ==
As part of the All-New, All-Different Marvel event, Hood creates his version of the Illuminati to acquire power and become part of the "big leagues" of the supervillains. Besides Hood, the members consist of Black Ant, Sylvie Lushton (Enchantress), Mad Thinker, Thunderball, and Titania. During the Avengers: Standoff! storyline, Absorbing Man sides with the Illuminati as they plan their revenge on S.H.I.E.L.D. for being imprisoned at Pleasant Hill.

== Killuminati ==
The fifth volume of New Avengers introduces the Killuminati, a group of evil clones of the Illuminati who were created by Jackal. Members of the Killuminati include Bolt (clone of Black Bolt), Mister Ourobouros (clone of Mister Fantastic), Guru Strange (clone of Doctor Strange), Professor X-Tinction (clone of Professor X), Luke Charles (clone of Black Panther), Iron Apex (clone of Iron Man), Imperius Rex (clone of Namor), Lord Britain (clone of Captain Britain), and Rapunzel (clone of Medusa).

== Roster ==
Members as of New Avengers Vol. 3 #3

=== Original team ===
Character	Real name	Joined in	Notes
Mister Fantastic	Reed Richards	New Avengers #7 (July 2005)	Leader of the Fantastic Four.
Doctor Strange	Stephen Strange	New Avengers #7 (July 2005)	Earth's Sorcerer Supreme.
Namor	Namor McKenzie	New Avengers #7 (July 2005)	King of Atlantis.
Black Bolt	Blackagar Boltagon	New Avengers #7 (July 2005)	King of the Inhumans.
Iron Man	Anthony "Tony" Stark	New Avengers #7 (July 2005)	Member of the Avengers.
Professor X	Charles Xavier	New Avengers #7 (July 2005)	Leader of the X-Men.

=== Recruits ===
Character	Real name	Joined in	Notes
Medusa	Medusalith Amaquelin Boltagon	Avengers vol. 4 #8	Left in Avengers vol. 4 #12, Queen of the Inhumans and current member of the Future Foundation.
Captain America	Steven Rogers	Avengers vol. 4 #12	Left in New Avengers vol. 3 #3. Current leader of the Avengers Unity Squad.
Black Panther	T'Challa	New Avengers vol. 3 #1	King of Wakanda, a major source of vibranium. Chosen by Stark to be an original member, as a representative of Wakanda, but turned it down. However, he would join them to face the Incursions.
Beast	Doctor Henry "Hank" McCoy	New Avengers vol. 3 #3 (February 2013)	Inherited Professor X's position. Member of the X-Men.
Hulk	Bruce Banner	Avengers vol. 5 #28 (April 2014)	Great scientist super-intelligent (as Bruce Banner). Angry monster super-intelligent (as Hulk's Doc Green form).
Captain Britain	Brian Braddock	New Avengers vol. 3 #24 (September 2014)	Member of the Captain Britain Corps.
Mastermind Excello	Amadeus Cho	New Avengers vol. 3 #24 (September 2014)	One of the top 10 most intelligent people in the world.
Yellowjacket	Doctor Henry Jonathan "Hank" Pym	New Avengers vol. 3 #24 (September 2014)	Earth's Scientist Supreme. Master of Many Sizes.

== Other versions ==
=== Earth-231 ===
In this reality, Mister Fantastic killed the other Illuminati members to keep them from being too ambitious.

=== Earth-976 ===
On Earth-976, the Illuminati consists of Iron Man, Mister Fantastic, Namor, Black Bolt, Doctor Doom and Magneto. Doom and Magneto's influence ensures the creation of the Superhuman Registration Act and the Initiative.

=== Earth-2319 ===
On Earth-2319, the Illuminati consists of Mister Fantastic, Doctor Doom, Black Panther, Yellowjacket, Captain Britain (Betsy Braddock), Captain Britain (Brian Braddock), Iron Man, and Emma Frost. They and their world are destroyed by Mapmakers during an incursion.

=== Earth-23099 ===
On Earth-23099, the Illuminati consists of Mister Fantastic, Iron Man, Professor X, Shuri, Black Panther, Black Bolt, Magneto, and Mar-Vell. They and their world are destroyed by Black Priests during an incursion.

=== Marvel Apes ===
In the Marvel Apes universe, the Illuminati are referred to as the Prime Eight. They consist of Black Bolt, Cleook, Doctor Doom, Nicole Furry, Hulk, Iron Mandrill, Professor X, and Silverback Surfer.

=== Ultimate Universe ===
The Maker's Council, a group based on the Illuminati, appears in the Ultimate Universe imprint. This version of the group was founded by the Maker and consists of world leaders, functioning as a worldwide shadow government. The group consists of Obadiah Stane, Emmanuel da Costa, Captain Britain, Lord Ra, Lord Khonshu, the Rasputin family (consisting of Colossus, Magik, and Omega Red), Hulk, and the Harada-Yoshida Alliance (consisting of Sunfire, Viper, and Silver Samurai).

=== What If ===
A What If detailed alternate outcomes of the Age of Ultron storyline. In this reality, the Illuminati plan to restore a national symbol of hope after the death of Captain America. They choose Frank Castle as Captain America's successor, because his service to his country makes him that symbol. Mister Fantastic gives Castle a better version of the Super-Soldier serum, making him the new Captain America. Decades later, Iron Man's plan to mass-produce serum-powered "Captain Americas" for each state for the Captain Americorps initiative disillusions Castle, who decides to retire.

== In other media ==
- The Illuminati make a cameo appearance in Planet Hulk, consisting of Iron Man, Doctor Strange, Mister Fantastic and Black Bolt.
- The Illuminati appear in Doctor Strange in the Multiverse of Madness (2022). This version of the group hails from Earth-838 and consists of its versions of Karl Mordo, Captain Peggy Carter, Black Bolt, Maria Rambeau / Captain Marvel, Reed Richards, and Charles Xavier. Their universe's Stephen Strange was also a member until the Illuminati executed him for drawing power from the Darkhold and replaced him with Mordo. They arrest Stephen Strange of Earth-616 and America Chavez for threatening the multiverse, but all save for Mordo are killed by the Scarlet Witch.
