= Stark Tower =

Marvel Comics location

- The Main Tower of the Stark Tower Complex when Sentry's Watchtower was still attached.
- First appearance: New Avengers #3 (February 2005)

In-universe information
- Other name: Avengers Tower
- Type: Building
- Locations: Manhattan, New York City
- Characters: Mighty Avengers; Dark Avengers; New Avengers; Avengers; Iron Man
- Publisher: Marvel Comics

The Stark Tower Complex is a high-rise building complex appearing in American comic books published by Marvel Comics. Located in Midtown Manhattan, New York City, USA, the fictional complex is named after its owner Tony Stark, who is the alter ego of the superhero Iron Man. The structure is composed of a 93-story Main Tower flanked by a 35-story South Building and 55-story North Building. Located at the top of the Main Tower was the Watchtower of the superhero The Sentry, but it has been replaced by Heimdall's observatory.

The Main Tower is informally known as Avengers Tower, as it serves as the headquarters of the superhero team, the Avengers, similar to the Avengers Mansion. Currently, the main Stark Tower is located in Broadway, occupying the space where the 4 Times Square building is in the real world.

The Stark Tower, eventually changed to Avengers Tower, has been shown in various films set in the Marvel Cinematic Universe, beginning with The Avengers (2012).

== Fictional history ==
The Stark Tower Complex was built as a world-class financial and business facility to complement the Midtown Manhattan business district. The building was completed as a gleaming beacon of modern architecture after four years of excavation and construction. It is located in the vicinity of Manhattan's Columbus Circle approximately 10 blocks north of the Baxter Building, headquarters of the superhero team the Fantastic Four.

While initially intending to use the top three floors of the Main Tower as his state-of-the-art bachelor pad, Stark gives them over to the Avengers as their base of operations after their former base, Avengers Mansion, is destroyed. Longtime Mansion caretaker Edwin Jarvis is asked to resume his duties in the new location. Later, when the Sentry joins the Avengers, his long-hidden Watchtower appears, integrating itself atop the Main Tower and the building's existing architecture. Serving as both Sentry's headquarters and as the private residences of Robert Reynolds and his wife Lindy, the 20-story watchtower is operated and maintained by CLOC (Centrally Located Organic Computer), a near-sentient computer of Sentry's own design. The lower levels of the Main Tower, along with both the South and North Buildings, are largely occupied with Stark's subsidiaries and non-profit organizations.

After the passing of the Superhuman Registration Act (SRA), Iron Man is tapped to head the task force charged with enforcing the Act. Subsequently, Stark Tower becomes the base of operations of the task force. The controversy surrounding the SRA breaks the Avengers team apart, forcing Tony Stark to form a new team, the Mighty Avengers. They continue to occupy the Main Tower's higher levels. When the Tower becomes the headquarters of the SRA task force, it is assigned a squad of Cape-Killer guards with the call sign "Force Unit 9".

In World War Hulk, a violent battle between the Hulk and Iron Man nearly destroys Stark Tower. The tower is rebuilt by Stark under his S.H.I.E.L.D. organization, making it S.H.I.E.L.D. property.

When Norman Osborn takes over S.H.I.E.L.D. and renames it H.A.M.M.E.R., he also takes ownership of the tower. After Osborn is removed from power following the Siege of Asgard, the tower is returned to Stark. Following Sentry's death, his watchtower disappears from the rooftop and is replaced by Heimdall's observatory as sign of solidarity between Earth and Asgard.

In Fear Itself, the Thing becomes Angir, the Breaker of Souls, after acquiring an Asgardian hammer and destroys the Tower. A new tower is later built on the site of the original.

During the Secret Wars storyline, Stark Tower is destroyed by the Children of Tomorrow during the incursion between Earth-616 and Earth-1610. Tony Stark, suffering financial difficulties at the time, is forced to sell the rebuilt Stark Tower to Qeng Enterprises. Stark and the Avengers relocate to another Stark Tower near Time Square.

== Reception ==
=== Critical response ===
George Marston of Newsarama included the Avengers Tower in their "Best Superhero Headquarters And Hideouts Of All Time" list. Comic Book Resources ranked the Avengers Tower 1st in their "10 Most Iconic Superhero Hideouts In Marvel Comics" list, and ranked the Stark Tower 6th in their "Avengers 10 Best Headquarters" list.

== Other versions ==
=== Marvel Adventures ===
An alternate version of the Stark Tower appears in Marvel Adventures: The Avengers.

=== Ultimate Universe ===
An alternate version of the Stark Tower appears in the Ultimate Universe. This version is the corporate headquarters of Stark/Stane, one of the largest companies of the technocratic North American Union. The Maker's Council attacks Stark Tower using a Stark/Stane satellite, framing Tony Stark and his allies as terrorists.

== In other media ==
=== Marvel Cinematic Universe ===
Stark Tower, later renamed Avengers Tower, appears in the Marvel Cinematic Universe. It is located on the site of the MetLife Building in real life, above Grand Central Terminal.

=== Television ===
- Stark Tower appears in The Avengers: Earth's Mightiest Heroes.
- Avengers Tower appears in Ultimate Spider-Man.
- Stark Tower appears in Iron Man: Armored Adventures.
- Stark Tower, modeled after the Marvel Cinematic Universe incarnation, appears in Avengers Assemble. This version acts as the Avengers' headquarters after the destruction of the Avengers Mansion in the pilot episode "The Avengers Protocol". In the episode "Avengers Disassembled", part of the tower is destroyed after Iron Man destroys his arc reactor to stop Ultron from taking over his satellites.
- Stark Tower appears in Marvel Disk Wars: The Avengers.
- Avengers Tower appears in Spider-Man.
- Avengers Tower serves as the Avengers' headquarters in Marvel Future Avengers.
- Avengers Tower appears in M.O.D.O.K..

=== Video games ===
- Stark Tower appears in Marvel: Ultimate Alliance. After the S.H.I.E.L.D. Helicarrier is damaged in an attack by Doctor Doom's Masters of Evil, Tony Stark offers his property as a provisional base of operations.
- Stark Tower appears as a level in The Punisher.
- Stark Tower appears in The Incredible Hulk.
- Stark Tower appears in Spider-Man: Web of Shadows.
- Stark Tower appears as a hub level in Marvel: Ultimate Alliance 2.
- Avengers Tower appears as a hub level in Marvel Heroes.
- Stark Tower appears in Lego Marvel Super Heroes.
- Avengers Tower appears as a landmark and hub level in Lego Marvel's Avengers.
- Avengers Tower appears as a stage in Marvel vs. Capcom: Infinite. In the game's story, it is relocated to New Metro City following the merging of the worlds, and serves as the headquarters for the allied heroes.
- Avengers Tower appears as a landmark in Insomniac Games' Marvel's Spider-Man series.
- Stark Tower appears in Marvel: Ultimate Alliance 3.
- Stark Tower appears in Marvel Snap.
- Stark Tower appears in Marvel Rivals.

=== Merchandise ===
- Stark Tower appears in VS System.
- Avengers Tower appears in Lego Super Heroes.
