= Cape-Killers =

Fictional comic book group

Publication information
- Publisher: Marvel Comics
- First appearance: Civil War #1 (May 2006)
- Created by: Steve McNiven; Mark Millar

In-story information
- Member(s): Various

The Cape-Killers, officially identified as the Superhuman Restraint Unit, is a fictional special operations unit appearing in American comic books published by Marvel Comics, designed by penciller Howard Chaykin.

== History ==
=== S.H.I.E.L.D. version ===
The Superhuman Restraint Unit, more commonly known as the Cape-Killers, are foot soldiers of S.H.I.E.L.D. equipped in armored suits during the "Civil War" crossover, where they are sent to bring in rogue superheroes. The Superhuman Restraint Unit wear armor and use hardware designed by Stark Industries, has two different styles of helmet (a riot protection helmet and a helmet with a gas mask) as well as suits that are out-fitted with internal comm systems, hover discs, firearms equipped with tranquilizing darts, and paralyzing lasers.

The suits have been shown to be susceptible to power surges, with Nick Fury developing a device that transmits an electromagnetic pulse directly into their comm systems. It is also shown that there is an override code used by the suit's designer that can freeze their suits.

The Superhuman Restraint Unit are seen in the subsequent Initiative story arc as well as impersonated by the Skrulls during the "Secret Invasion" storyline, but are discontinued by Norman Osborn's H.A.M.M.E.R. at the start of the "Dark Reign" storyline.

=== Second version ===
The Cape-Killers would later be revived by Agent Julia Gao of the NYPD during the "Devil's Reign" storyline. Enforcing the Anti-Vigilante Act previously enacted by former New York City Mayor Wilson Fisk, Gao recruits several supervillains like Electro, the Scorpion, Taskmaster and Hightail into the Cape Killers in exchange for clemency and first deploys them during the "Carnage Reigns" event to stop Cletus Kasady. Gao and the Cape Killers frequently clash with Spider-Man, but are often forced to work together.

After the Gang War ends and Fisk's Anti-Vigilante Act is repealed, Cage orders the Cape Killers to disband, with its members either having their sentences commuted or returned to imprisonment. Although Cage lets Gao keep her title and has her transferred to a different department, Gao seeks out Rabble to form her own alliance in thwarting New York's superhuman activities. Spider-Man narrowly defeats Rabble, freeing the Cape-Killers from her control. Gao escapes as Cage arrives and disbands the Cape-Killers.

After the Cape-Killers disband, Julia Gao becomes a fugitive. She later becomes an avatar of Ares, assuming the name War-Cry.

== Known teams and members ==
=== S.H.I.E.L.D. version ===
- 9-6 - An unlicensed hero recovery team.
- Agent Abrams - The leader of a failed mission to capture Nitro, during which he was killed.
- Agent Cleery
- Agent Doug - Security for the Santa Monica Farmers' Market.
- Aerial Company C & Aerial Company E - Posted in the Manhattan area after "World War Hulk".
- Clyde Dobronski
- Dum Dum Dugan
- Force Unit 9 - Guards of Avengers Tower.
- Maria Hill
- Major Tom Aramaki - The leader of a mecha unit.
- Team Cobra - A team which included Commander Gabriel Jones and Agent Whitman.
- Team 1 & Team 2 - Two teams that were assigned to the Baxter Building.
- Sentinel Squad O*N*E
- Special Agent Marquez and Agent McAllister
- Skrulls
  - Criti Noll

=== Second version ===
- Julia Gao - An NYPD agent who is the second task force's founder and commander.
- Electro
- Gust - A teenage girl with aerokinetic abilities who is arrested for violating the Powers Act and forced to work with the Cape Killers in exchange for freedom.
- Hightail - A mutant speedster and former criminal who is forced to work with the Cape Killers.
- Scorpion
- Taskmaster

== In other media ==
- The Cape-Killers appear in Marvel Ultimate Alliance 2.
- A variation of the Cape-Killers appears in the Avengers Assemble four-part episode "Civil War". This version of the organization is headed by Ultron.
