= Sentry (Robert Reynolds) =

Marvel Comics fictional character

- Sentry as depicted in The Sentry vol. 3 #1 (June 2018). Art by Bryan Hitch.

Publication information
- Publisher: Marvel Comics
- First appearance: The Sentry #1 (2000)
- Created by: Paul Jenkins (writer); Jae Lee (artist); Rick Veitch

In-story information
- Alter ego: Robert "Bob" Reynolds
- Species: Human mutate
- Team affiliations: Avengers; New Avengers; Mighty Avengers; Dark Avengers; Horsemen of Death
- Notable aliases: List: Golden Guardian of Good Golden Man Golden Boy The Void Golden One World Breaker Revenant Prime
- Abilities: List: As merged Sentry: Reality manipulation; Matter manipulation; Molecular control; Superhuman strength, speed, endurance, agility, reflexes, senses and durability; Enhanced senses (night vision, microscopic vision, telescopic vision, infrared vision, X-ray vision); Extrasensory perception (clairvoyance, soul vision, aura vision, energy detection); Practical invulnerability; Psionic powers; Astral projection; Telepathy; Telekinesis; Teleportation; Reincarnation; Immortality; Resurrection; Regenerative healing factor; Energy manipulation; Weather manipulation; Flight; Heat vision; Invisibility; Intangibility; Illusion inducement; Biokinesis; Life creation

The Sentry (Robert "Bob" Reynolds) and The Void are, respectively, a superhero and supervillain appearing in American comic books published by Marvel Comics. Created by Paul Jenkins and Jae Lee, with uncredited conceptual contributions by Rick Veitch, the characters first appeared in The Sentry #1 (2000).

Sentry is a metafictional character who had existed since the 1950s in-universe, but had all memories of his existence erased. He gained his powers from a version of the super-soldier serum that created Captain America, giving him immense power coupled with a destructive alternate personality called the Void. In his self-titled debut series, Robert Reynolds returns to the public after realizing that nobody remembers the Sentry's existence, which also affected him. During the 2020 storyline King in Black, Sentry is killed by Knull, who absorbs the Void into himself. Sentry's powers are taken by civilian Mallory Gibbs, who becomes known as Solarus. Sentry returned in a self-titled series, published in 2026.

Robert "Bob" Reynolds / Sentry and the Void appears in the Marvel Cinematic Universe (MCU) film Thunderbolts* (2025), portrayed by Lewis Pullman. He will reprise the role in Avengers: Doomsday (2026).

== Publication history ==
=== Creation ===
In the late 1990s, Paul Jenkins and Rick Veitch developed an idea by Jenkins about "an over-the-hill guy, struggling with an addiction, who had a tight relationship with his dog" into a proposal for Marvel Comics' Marvel Knights line. Jenkins conceived of the character as "a guardian type, with a watchtower", and came up with the name "Sentry" (after previously considering "Centurion"). Veitch suggested that the character could be woven into the history of the Marvel Universe, with versions of the character from the 1940s onwards depicted in artistic styles matching the comics of each period.

In the comics, Project: Sentry was launched in 1947, but soon disintegrated into multiple sub-projects with almost zero government control. Professor Cornelius Worth, a project-in-charge, completed the formula 10 years later in New York. Veitch also suggested that due to some cataclysmic event, all recollection of the Sentry would have been removed from everyone's memory (including his own). Jenkins and Veitch decided that they would create not only a fictional history for the Sentry within the Marvel Universe, but also a fictional publication history in the real world, complete with imaginary creators (Juan Pinkles and Chick Rivet, anagrams of Jenkins and Veitch's names). Jenkins pitched the concept to Marvel Knights editor Joe Quesada. Quesada decided to commission a miniseries written by Jenkins with art by Jae Lee, with whom Jenkins had previously worked on an Inhumans miniseries.

=== Publication ===
The Sentry was first introduced in his 2000 eponymous Marvel Knights miniseries written by Paul Jenkins with art by Jae Lee. The miniseries ran for five issues and then segued directly into a series of flashback one-shots in which the Sentry teamed up with the Fantastic Four, Spider-Man, Angel, and the Hulk. These one-shots led to The Sentry vs. the Void, an additional one-shot that wrapped up the story of the miniseries and one-shots. In 2005, writer Brian Michael Bendis reused the Sentry by making him a member of the New Avengers. The Sentry played a minor role in the first arc, Breakout (issues #1–6), and was the focus of the second arc, The Sentry (issues #7–10); Jenkins himself was featured as a character in the second one. Also in 2005, the Sentry received another miniseries, written by Jenkins and drawn by John Romita Jr., which ran for eight issues. The Sentry appeared in The Mighty Avengers as a member of that team, and later in Dark Avengers in a similar capacity, and as protagonist in The Age of the Sentry miniseries. He appeared as a regular character in the Dark Avengers series from issue #1 (March 2009) until the time of his death in the Siege limited series.

On March 6, 2018, it was announced that the character would be given an ongoing series written by Jeff Lemire and with art by Joshua Cassara and Kim Jacinto. The series ended after five issues.

In 2024, a new Sentry miniseries was published. It introduced a new version of Sentry, Mallory Gibbs / Solarus, who gained Robert Reynolds' powers after his death during the "King in Black" event (2020).

Another Sentry series was published in 2026, written by Paul Jenkins. It sees the return of Sentry following his death in "King in Black".

== Fictional character biography ==
=== Sentry and the Marvel Universe ===
Cover art to The Sentry #2 by Jae Lee (line art) and Jose Villarrubia (painted colors).

Civilian Bob Reynolds remembers that he is Sentry, a superhero whose "power of one million exploding suns" is derived from a special serum. Realizing that his archenemy the Void is returning, Reynolds seeks out several prominent Marvel characters to warn them and to discover why no one remembers the Sentry.

The characters' memories of the Sentry and the Void resurface when Reynolds talks with them. The Sentry had taught Angel how to conquer his fear of falling. Peter Parker's photograph of the Sentry earned him a Pulitzer Prize and fame. Hulk had never forgotten the Sentry, whom he called "Golden Man". Under the Sentry's influence, Hulk had been a force for good and won the adoration of the public. Mister Fantastic remembered the Sentry was his best friend and that the Fantastic Four had teamed up with him on many adventures. Meanwhile, the general public gradually came to remember the Sentry, as did Reynolds' old sidekick, Billy Turner, who was formerly known as the Scout (now scarred and missing a forearm, due to an attack from the Void).

During the course of his investigation, Reynolds and Mister Fantastic discover that the Sentry and the Void are two halves of the same person. To save the world, Reynolds erased all memory of the Sentry from the mind of nearly every person on Earth, including himself. When the Void returns and threatens to attack the East Coast of the United States, Reynolds works with Mister Fantastic and Doctor Strange to erase the public's memory of Sentry once more.

In the 2026 series Sentry, it is revealed that Reynolds learned of the story of Laika at the age of 7 and mourned her death for the next year. It is alleged that this event led to the manifestation of the Void within him.

=== Avengers ===
Cover art to The Sentry (vol. 2) #1. Art by John Romita Jr.

Reynolds reappears inside the supervillain prison the Raft, having been voluntarily imprisoned for murdering his wife Lindy Lee. When Electro causes a massive jail break at the Raft, Reynolds defends several other characters from Carnage, whom he flies to space and rips in half.

Eventually, the Avengers learn that Mastermind, under the direction of an enemy of the Sentry known only as the General, implanted a psychic "virus" in Reynolds' mind that impaired his memory. As a cry for help, he subconsciously implanted his memories into the mind of comic book writer Paul Jenkins, who then transferred those memories to comic books. The Avengers track Reynolds down and show him that his wife, whom he confessed to murdering, is alive. The Sentry flees, and he finds himself waking up in the small suburban house he shares with Lindy. His appearance has changed in an instant, and he appears to be living the life of an ordinary man.

When the Avengers confront him, Reynolds insists that the Void is coming, who will destroy them all, and that he cannot stop it. The Void arrives, now a separate entity from Reynolds, and attacks the Avengers. Emma Frost frees Reynolds from the virus and restore his memories, and the Sentry joins the Avengers. Sentry's Watchtower appears atop Stark Tower, where it had previous been hidden from view.

Unable to reconcile that he, Robert Reynolds, and the Void are the same being, the Sentry confronts his psychiatrist, Cornelius Worth, and begins switching rapidly between his personalities. The Sentry explains that neither he, nor the Void, represent the entirety of Robert Reynolds, as the two do not share memories. Sentry reveals that Reynolds gained his powers as a teenager after stealing a serum that was developed in a failed attempt to recreate the super-soldier serum that created Captain America, intending to use it as a drug. The Sentry then bids Worth farewell, telling him that he will seek out help to answer his existential questions.

The Void claims that the serum Reynolds ingested was several times more powerful than the super-soldier serum. He was considered dangerous by the government because his blood could be used to create more of the serum, enough for the entire world. Several failed attempts were made to kill him. Enraged by this revelation, the Sentry throws the Void into the Sun, telling his enemy that he no longer needs him to balance his own actions of good. The Void promises to return.

=== Mighty Avengers ===
The Sentry is recruited by Iron Man to join the Mighty Avengers, the newest incarnation of the Avengers. While at first there is some dispute between the Sentry and Lindy, Robert joins the team while Iron Man and Ms. Marvel offer him assistance to treat his mental illness. After Ultron kills his wife Lindy, Sentry flies into a rage and attacks him. He returns to his Watchtower to find Lindy alive, having apparently resurrected her himself.

=== Dark Avengers ===
Sentry joins the Dark Avengers, Norman Osborn's team of Avengers, stating that Osborn is helping him in return after Osborn confides his own mental deficiency in him. However, the Void resurfaces and takes control of Robert Reynolds' body. Osborn flies to the Void, claiming that he was breaking their "deal", and has Bullseye murder Lindy Lee.

During the 2010 storyline "Siege", Sentry is pitted against the Avengers and others who rebel against Osborn. At Osborn's request, the Sentry destroys Asgard. The Void then takes complete control of Sentry and kills Ares. After defeating the entire Avengers contingent, Sentry is eventually reverted to human form. He asks to be killed; following a brief outburst from the Void, his wish is granted by Thor. Thor carries Reynolds' body to the sun and cremates him there.

=== Resurrection ===
The Sentry is later resurrected by the Apocalypse Twins, who use a Celestial Death Seed to transform him into a member of their new Horsemen of Death. The Sentry claims he became trapped in the sun after his death, dying and regenerating repeatedly, and that the Void became bored and left him.

It is later revealed that Doctor Strange created a pocket dimension where Robert Reynolds can fight the Void with Scout and his Corgi Watchdog, preventing the Void from controlling him in the real world. Unbeknownst to him, Billy has allied with Cranio, one of Sentry's oldest enemies, to duplicate the Sentry formula and trap Robert Reynolds in the pocket dimension, allowing Billy to become the new Sentry. Scout battles Reynolds, but is defeated and killed when Reynolds decides to stop fighting the Void and merge with him. The merged Sentry easily kills Scout, then removes Cranio from the pocket dimension. When the Avengers confront him, Sentry leaves for space.

=== Death and legacy ===
During the "King in Black" storyline, Sentry is summoned by the Avengers to fight Knull. He attempts to fly Knull into space, as he had done to Carnage, only for Knull to break free, kill Sentry by tearing him in half, and absorb the Void.

Sentry's corpse is reassembled and used by Director None and the Blasphemy Cartel to house 100 million ghosts intent on destroying Stephen and Clea Strange. The pair break the spell keeping the ghosts contained. Sentry's corpse explodes from the force of the ghosts' release.

Mallory Gibbs and five other civilians acquire Sentry's powers, with Mallory later absorbing the powers into herself. She agrees to be arrested by Misty Knight until she can control her powers. Once she controls her powers, she decides to go by the new moniker Solarus.

=== Return ===
The Sentry is revealed to have once again returned to life in a self-titled miniseries written by co-creator Paul Jenkins, published in March 2026. Sentry is reintroduced via a press conference alongside members of the Fantastic Four, Spider-Man, Iron Man and Captain Marvel having spent the previously years exploring the cosmos. The Sentry has returned to life but so has the Void. Robert Reynolds must now learn to balance the true source of his power the Void.

== Powers and abilities ==
=== Sentry ===
The Sentry's powers derive from a variant of the Super-Soldier Serum that "moves his molecules an instant ahead of the current timeline."

Sentry's exact abilities and their limits are unknown. He is shown to possess immense strength, durability, speed, and senses. He can absorb and project vast amounts of energy, capable of harming even the Hulk. The Sentry has also demonstrated the ability to teleport himself in a blinding flash of light, and fly at vast supersonic speeds.

=== Void ===
Robert Reynolds projects an entity as a dark side effect of his powers. It has been claimed that for every benevolent act the Sentry performs, the Void corresponds with attempting an act of malevolence. The Void possesses several abilities that the Sentry does not, including the ability to create destructive storms and tendrils that attack the mind.

== Accolades ==
- In 2015, Entertainment Weekly ranked Sentry 44th in their "Let's rank every Avenger ever" list.
- In 2017, Comic Book Resources (CBR) ranked Sentry 2nd in their "15 Most Overpowered Avengers" list.
- In 2017, Den of Geek ranked Sentry 10th in their "Guardians of the Galaxy 3: 50 Marvel Characters We Want to See" list.
- In 2018, CBR ranked Sentry 4th in their "25 Fastest Characters In The Marvel Universe" list.
- In 2021, Collider ranked Sentry 7th in their "20 Most Powerful Marvel Characters" list.
- In 2021, CBR ranked Sentry 1st in their "Marvel: The 10 Strongest Male Avengers" list.
- In 2022, Screen Rant included Sentry in their "10 Most Powerful Avengers In Marvel Comics" list and in their "X-Men: 10 Most Powerful Horsemen Of Apocalypse" list.
- In 2022, Sportskeeda ranked Sentry 5th in their "10 most overpowered superheroes in the Marvel Universe" list.
- In 2022, CBR ranked Sentry 1st in their "8 Fastest Avengers" list and 2nd in their "10 Scariest Avengers" list.

== Literary reception ==
=== Volumes ===
==== Sentry - 2000 ====
According to Diamond Comic Distributors, Sentry #1 was the 31st best selling comic book in July 2000.

David Harth of CBR.com ranked the Sentry comic book series 10th in their "10 Best Things About Marvel Comics From The 2000s," writing, "The Sentry told the story of the forgotten hero, a story about a man with too much power wrestling with his own demons and hidden history as one of Marvel's greatest superheroes. It was a great way to kick off the decade for the publisher." Rosie Knight of Nerdist included the Sentry comic book series in their "8 Must-Read Marvel Knights Stories," asserting, "This meta-text on superheroes from The Inhumans‘ Jae Lee and Paul Jenkins is one of the more unique takes that Marvel Knights had to offer, focusing on a middle aged man named Bob Reynolds who one day remembers he is in fact a hero named Sentry. This miniseries follows Bob as he attempts to warn other Marvel characters about the return of his foe, whilst also figuring out why no one can remember his superhero alter-ego. If you're not aware of the Sentry, then the big reveal here will be a real gut punch as Lee and Jenkins create a seminal Sentry story in just five issues."

==== Sentry - 2005 ====
According to Diamond Comic Distributors, Sentry #1 was the 17th best selling comic book in September 2005. Sentry #2 was the 30th best selling comic book in October 2005.

==== Sentry - 2018 ====
According to Diamond Comic Distributors, Sentry #1 was the 63rd best selling comic book in June 2018.

Joshua Davison of Bleeding Cool wrote, "Sentry #1 is another excellent self-conscious superhero title from Jeff Lemire, and it does so without going fully meta, which is an overused tactic in modern comics. The story is compelling, and Bob Reynolds is made to be an interesting character to follow. This one gets a recommendation. Give it a read." Adam Barnhardt of ComicBook.com gave Sentry #1 a grade of 5 out of 5, saying, "Lemire's ability to write the internal conflicts his protagonists face is second to none and after his iconic run on Moon Knight, a comic with Robert Reynolds was a long time coming. He's able to craft tales where the readers struggle to separate fact and fiction, yet everything eventually falls into place, and that's exactly the type of writer a character like Robert Reynolds needs. Lemire and The Sentry are a match made in heaven."

== Other versions ==
Various alternate universe versions of Sentry have appeared throughout the character's publication history. In Age of Apocalypse, Sentry is a member of the Black Legion. In Marvel Zombies, Sentry is patient zero of the zombie virus, having been infected by his future self via a predestination paradox.

== In other media ==
=== Film ===
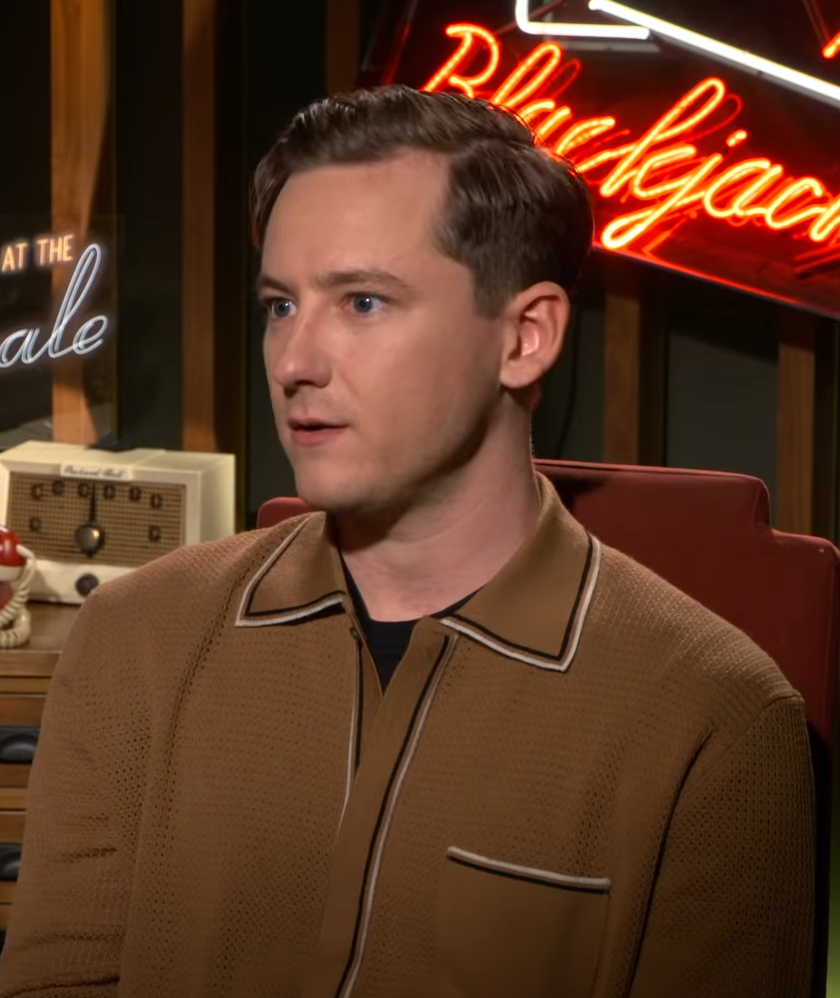
Lewis Pullman portrays Robert "Bob" Reynolds in the Marvel Cinematic Universe.

- Robert "Bob" Reynolds as the Sentry and the Void appears in the Marvel Cinematic Universe (MCU) film Thunderbolts* (2025), portrayed by Lewis Pullman as an adult and by Clayton Cooper as a child. This version gained his powers from Valentina Allegra de Fontaine and the O.X.E. Group after volunteering for their experimentation due to having developed a drug addiction. Initially intending for him to replace the Avengers, Reynolds' poor mental health leads to him becoming the Void and consuming New York in darkness until the Thunderbolts talk him down and help him regain control. Reynolds goes on to join the Thunderbolts after De Fontaine rebrands them as the New Avengers.
- Bob Reynolds / Sentry will appear in the upcoming MCU film Avengers: Doomsday (2026), portrayed again by Lewis Pullman.

=== Video games ===
- The Sentry and the Void appear in the Nintendo DS version of Marvel: Ultimate Alliance 2, voiced by Nolan North.
- The Sentry and the Void appear as playable characters in Marvel Super Hero Squad Online, voiced by Charlie Adler.
- The Sentry and the Void appear as playable characters in Marvel Contest of Champions.
- The Sentry and the Void appear as playable characters in Marvel Puzzle Quest.
- The Sentry and the Void appear in Lego Marvel's Avengers.
- The Sentry and the Void appear as playable characters in Marvel: Future Fight.
- The Sentry and the Void appear in Marvel Snap.
- The Sentry will appear as a playable character in Marvel Mystic Mayhem, voiced by Dustin Rubin.

=== Merchandise ===
- The Sentry and the Void received a figure in the Marvel Legends toy line via the Wal-Mart exclusive Giant-Man series, with an additional bearded variant also being available.
- The Sentry and the Void received a figure from Hasbro.
- The Sentry and the Void received a figure in the Avengers Infinite Series.

=== Music ===
- The Sentry and the Void served as inspiration for the song "A Million Exploding Suns" by Horse the Band.
- The Sentry and the Void served as inspiration for Seth Sentry.

=== Web ===
The Sentry appears in the online web series Death Battle, where he faces DC Comics character Superboy-Prime.

== Collected editions ==
Title	Material collected	Publication date	ISBN
The Sentry	Sentry (vol. 1) #1–5, Sentry: Fantastic Four; Sentry: Hulk; Sentry: Spider-Man, Sentry: X-Men and Sentry Vs Void	December 1, 2001	978-0785107996
The Sentry: Reborn	Sentry (vol. 2) #1–8	August 23, 2006	978-0785117070
Age of Sentry	Age of Sentry #1–6	June 3, 2009	978-0785135203
Sentry: Man of Two Worlds	Sentry (vol. 3) #1–5	December 19, 2018	978-1302913380
Sentry: Legacy	Sentry (vol. 4) #1-4	August 20, 2024	978-1302955700
Sentry	Sentry (vol. 5) #1-4	December 15, 2026	978-1302969165

== See also ==
- Metafiction – Genre of fiction about fiction
