= Incoming! (comics) =

Publication information
- Publisher: Marvel Comics
- Format: One-shot
- Genre: Superhero
- Publication date: December 26, 2019
- No. of issues: 1
- Main character: Marvel Universe

Creative team
- Written by: Saladin Ahmed; Jason Aaron; Ed Brisson; Donny Cates; Al Ewing; Eve Ewing; Jonathan Hickman; Tini Howard; Greg Pak; Matt Rosemberg; Dan Slott; Chip Zdarsky
- Penciller(s): Joe Bennett; Carmen Carnero; Jim Cheung; Mattia De Iulis; Jorge Fornes; Javier Garron; Kim Jacinto; Aaron Kuder; Francesco Manna; Carlos Pacheco; Humberto Ramos; R.B. Silva; Andrea Sorrentino; Luciano Vecchio; Annie Wu

Incoming! is a one-shot comic book issue published by Marvel Comics on December 26, 2019.

== Publication history ==
Incoming! was announced during Disney's D23 by Marvel Comics' C. B. Cebulski and Tom Brevoort, stating that issue will "shape the future of Marvel Comics into 2020 and beyond. From a single moment in the pages of the Dark Phoenix Saga to the events of Marvel Comics of today."

== Premise ==
On New Year's Eve, a mysterious murder brings every hero to search for the killer, but the trial will lead them to unforeseen results for the Marvel Universe, especially after the identities of both the victim and killer are revealed.

== Plot ==
Arriving on a crime scene, where the murder victim appears to be strangled in his apartment, the Masked Raider asks Matt Murdock and Elektra Natchios for help to investigate, but Matt calls Jessica Jones instead who deduces the victim's apartment has a photo with the phrase "2Faced" written, along with a large code of numbers and a familiar star brand. Jessica calls for Carol Danvers, who delivers this information to T'Challa, who leads her to Adam Brashear. Adam deduces that "2Faced" is hiding a hexadecimal number, so Dwayne Taylor calls Richard Rider, to no avail. Therefore, the Agents of Atlas search for Amadeus Cho, who becomes the target from the public eye after talking with Bruce Banner, who has declared war against corporations like Roxxon. Johnny Blaze still hunts Mephisto in Las Vegas before finding Wong. Eddie Brock gets worried for his son Dylan, who has visions of Knull. Peter Parker and Miles Morales discuss about Senator Geoffrey Patrick forbidding teenage superheroes. Teddy Altman accepts a mysterious offer at the cost of leaving Billy Kaplan. On the nation of Krakoa, Nathaniel Essex takes interest in Franklin Richards. Meanwhile, Mister Fantastic receives Adam to investigate the murder in the apartment. When a plane carrying Kiren Khanna goes haywire by its A.I. program, he and his pilot are saved by Iron Man (Arno Stark). When Adam asks him about the mysterious code, Stark deduces it is a cipher hiding a three-word message, but Adam leaves before Stark could tell him. Reed asks Jane Foster to perform an autopsy on the victim's corpse. Reed later recognizes the victim as Bel-Dann, a former Kree warrior. He also deduces the message in numbers means "beneath the trees". Reed reunites Jessica, Carol and Adam, who initially suspect the killer was Raksor, Bel-Dann's Skrull partner and former enemy. However, after learning of Bel-Dann's death, Raksor reveals to the others that the mysterious message was sent directly to him and whoever killed him wants to start another war. Raksor and Bel-Dann only wanted to leave the Earth and return to their home planets once their new asset was activated. Before Raksor could tell them more about the case, his body mutates into a tree, killing him. At the end, Teddy accepts the offer of becoming the new ruler of the Kree–Skrull Alliance, adopting the mantle of "Dorrek VIII" and beginning the preparations of invading the Earth for "the final war".

== Reception ==
Incoming! received mixed reviews from critics, earning an average rating of 6.6 out of 10, based on 10 reviews aggregated by Comic Book Roundup.

== Future ==
The end of Incoming! leads to several events:

- Iron Man 2020 (January 15, 2020)
- X-Men/Fantastic Four (February 5, 2020)
- Outlawed (March 18, 2020)
- Empyre (July 15, 2020)
- King in Black (December 2, 2020)
