= Wiccan (character) =

Marvel Comics superhero

- Wiccan as depicted in Avengers: The Children's Crusade #1 (July 2010). Art by Jim Cheung.

Publication information
- Publisher: Marvel Comics
- First appearance: As William Maximoff: The Vision and the Scarlet Witch #12 (September 1986); As Asgardian: Young Avengers #1 (April 2005); As Billy Kaplan: Young Avengers #3 (April 2005); As Wiccan: Young Avengers #6 (June 2005)
- Created by: William Maximoff: Steve Englehart; Richard Howell; Billy Kaplan: Allan Heinberg; Jim Cheung

In-story information
- Alter ego: William "Billy" Kaplan-Altman
- Species: Human mutant
- Place of origin: New York City
- Team affiliations: Young Avengers; Avengers Idea Mechanics; Strikeforce; Guardians of the Galaxy; Avengers
- Partnerships: Hulkling (husband); Speed (twin brother); M'Kraan (creation)
- Notable aliases: Billy Maximoff; Asgardian; Demiurge
- Abilities: Magical abilities such as chaos magic; Flight; Reality warping; Psionic abilities (telekinesis, telepathy, mental control, astral projection, precognition); Elemental manipulation (including cryokinesis, photokinesis, and electrokinesis); Force fields; Teleportation; Healing

Wiccan (William "Billy" Kaplan-Altman) is a superhero appearing in American comic books published by Marvel Comics. The character has been depicted as a member of the Young Avengers, a team of teenage superheroes, as well as Strikeforce and New Avengers. Created by writer Allan Heinberg and artist Jim Cheung, the character first appeared in Young Avengers #1 (April 2005). The character's appearance is patterned on that of two prominent Marvel superheroes, Thor and Scarlet Witch (Wiccan's mother), both of whom are members of the Avengers. Like the Scarlet Witch, Wiccan possesses powerful magical abilities which make him a key member of his superhero team.

Recruited to the Young Avengers by Iron Lad, Wiccan's story includes the discovery that he and fellow teen hero Speed are in fact long-lost twin brothers, and that the pair are reincarnations of the sons of Scarlet Witch and her husband Vision, Billy reincarnated from William Maximoff. Significant storylines for the character include his and his brother's search for their original mother, learning to master his powers, and an ongoing relationship with his teammate (later husband) Hulkling.

Alongside his permanent role as a member of the Young Avengers, Wiccan has also been a member of Avengers Idea Mechanics, Strikeforce, the Guardians of the Galaxy, and Avengers. He is known for being a prominent openly gay Jewish superhero in Marvel Comics.

Billy Maximoff appeared in the Marvel Cinematic Universe (MCU) Disney+ miniseries WandaVision (2021), played by Baylen Bielitz and Julian Hilliard, with Hilliard returning as a Billy from an alternate universe in the film Doctor Strange in the Multiverse of Madness (2022). Maximoff returned in his teenage reincarnation, William Kaplan's body, in the series Agatha All Along (2024) and VisionQuest (2026), portrayed by Joe Locke.

== Publication history ==
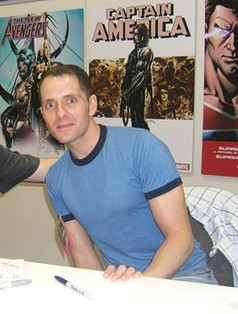
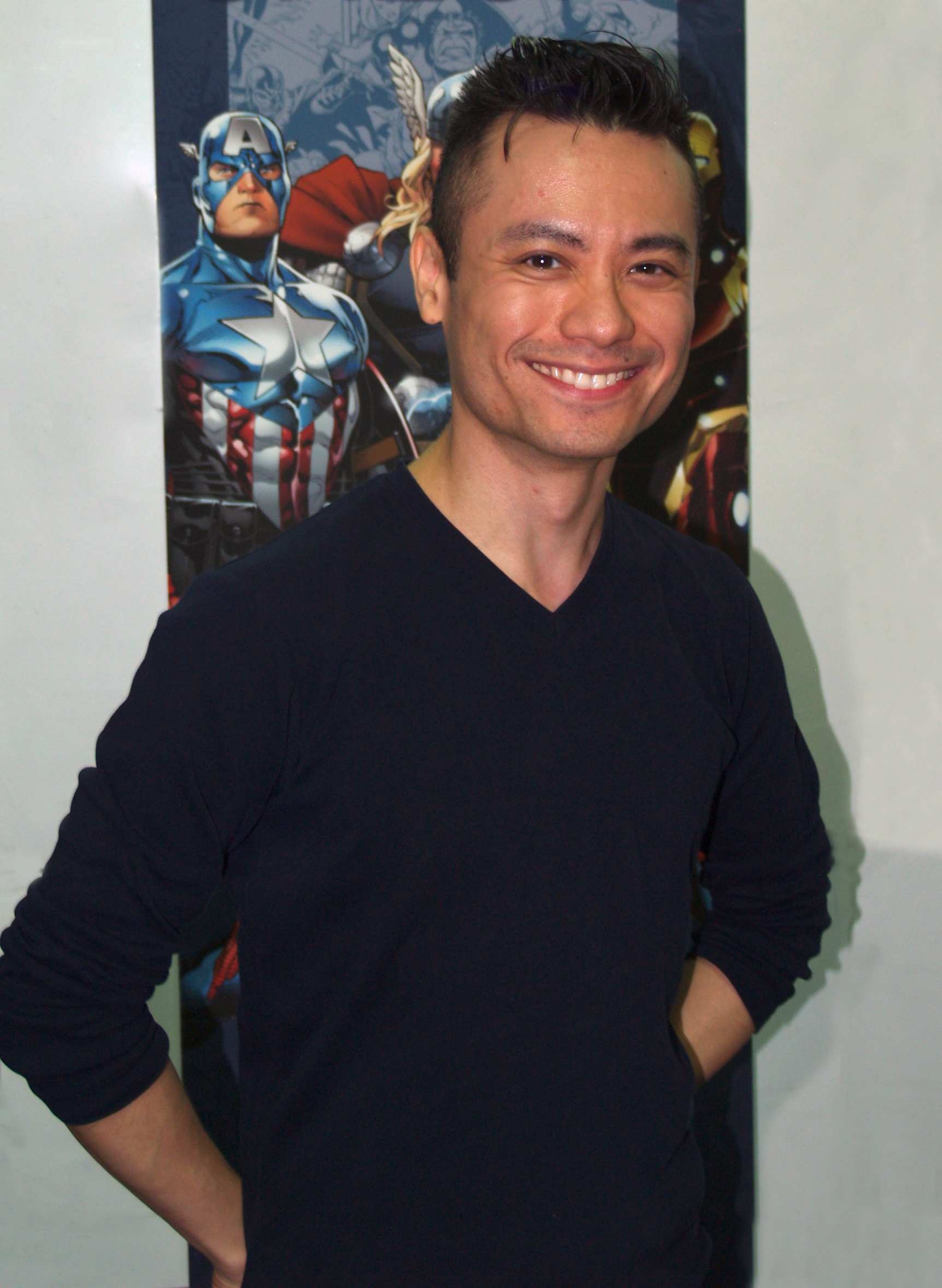
The creators of Wiccan: writer Allan Heinberg (left), and artist Jim Cheung (right)

Wiccan first appeared in Young Avengers #1 (April 2005). The issue was scripted by Allan Heinberg and drawn by Jim Cheung. One of the original four members of the Young Avengers, the team was founded after the Avengers disbanded in the story line Avengers Disassembled.

Initially, Heinberg assumed that Marvel would not allow him to write two lead gay characters. Because of this, he originally planned to write Billy's love interest, Hulkling, as a female shapeshifter named Chimera. Chimera would discover that her true form was male, which would force Billy to decide if he was still in love with him. However, due to the complexity of this proposed story line, editor Tom Brevoort suggested simply making both characters gay.

Afterward the series concluded, Wiccan continued to appear alongside the Young Avengers in series such as Young Avengers Presents and Dark Reign: Young Avengers; the event comic tie-ins Civil War, Secret Invasion and Siege: Young Avengers (co-starring with The Runaways in the former two); and various other guest appearances. From 2010 to 2012 he was a part of the main cast in Avengers: The Children's Crusade, written and drawn by the original Young Avengers creative team of Allan Heinberg and Jim Cheung.

Wiccan was again a main character in the 2013 Young Avengers series by Kieron Gillen and Jamie McKelvie.

As part of the All-New All-Different Marvel relaunch in 2015, Wiccan became a main character in New Avengers vol. 4, written by Al Ewing, as a member of an Avengers team led by Sunspot, alongside Hulkling, Songbird, Squirrel Girl, Hawkeye, Power Man and White Tiger. During this time he also briefly appeared in the Scarlet Witch series by James Robinson. New Avengers ended at issue #18 (January 2017) with Wiccan and Hulkling in semi-retirement.

An alternate-future version of Wiccan who became the Sorcerer Supreme appears in Doctor Strange and the Sorcerers Supreme.

In 2019, Wiccan appeared in Unstoppable Wasp #7 (July 2019) and War of the Realms: War Scrolls #2 (July 2019). Later that year, he and Hulkling co-starred in the four-issue miniseries Death's Head written by Tini Howard. Soon after, Wiccan became a main character in Strikeforce, also written by Howard, alongside Blade, Angela, Spider-Woman, Monica Rambeau, Daimon Hellstrom and Winter Soldier. The series ended at issue #9 in August 2020.

Wiccan is a prominent supporting character in the event comic miniseries Empyre.

Wiccan and Hulkling join Al Ewing's Guardians of the Galaxy series starting with #13 in April 2021 as part of a new story arc, joining current members Star-Lord, Nova, Gamora, Groot, and Rocket Raccoon. He was also a supporting character in Jonathan Hickman's 2025 series Imperial.

Wiccan received his own five issue solo limited series, Wiccan: Witches' Road from December 2025 to April 2026 written by Wyatt Kennedy.

== Fictional character biography ==
=== William Maximoff ===
Thomas Maximoff and William Maximoff were twins born to the superhuman sorceress Wanda Maximoff, the Scarlet Witch, and the android hero Vision, both members of the Avengers. The pregnancy and births were the result of Scarlet Witch temporarily tapping into a great source of magical energy that allowed her to grant herself a wish for family. Later, the twins are taken by the villain Master Pandemonium, a servant of the demon lord Mephisto. Mephisto claims that after his defeat at the hands of the powerful Franklin Richards, his essence was divided into several pieces and scattered, and that Wanda inadvertently used two of these pieces to give life to her twins, who in reality are magical constructs. Mephisto then apparently wiped the boys Thomas and William from existence, reabsorbing their energy. Following these events, Wanda and Vision end their marriage.

Somehow, years before the marriage of Wanda and Vision, their twins are reborn as Thomas Shepherd (later the hero called Speed) and Billy Kaplan, two boys physically identical (except for hair color) but born to different families.

=== Billy Kaplan ===
William "Billy" Kaplan is the eldest of three sons born to Jeff Kaplan, a cardiologist, and Rebecca Kaplan, a psychologist.

Regularly bullied in school, Billy looks up to superheroes, particularly the Avengers team. He finds solace outside the gates of the Avengers Mansion. One day after being injured in a fight with bullies, Billy encounters the Scarlet Witch, who tells him to stand his ground the next time he's bullied and touches his head, healing him.

A few weeks later, Billy acts to defend another kid being bullied, demonstrating his magical powers for the first time and nearly killing his tormentor. Afterward, he begins practicing with his powers, learning he can generate lightning and fly. He can also cast spells by chanting his intentions.

==== Young Avengers ====
A few years later, due to the influence of Doctor Doom and being overwhelmed by temporarily increased power, Scarlet Witch attacks the Avengers, destroying Vision and Avengers Mansion. Before his destruction, Vision created a protocol to activate and recruit a team of young people with superhuman abilities and who are connected in some way to the Avengers team. One of those selected is Billy, indicating that Vision and others learned his power was similar to that of Wanda Maximoff. Iron Lad, a young version of Kang the Conqueror, becomes leader of these Young Avengers. Billy is known as Asgardian, and later Wiccan. During the team's initial adventures, Billy starts flirting with teammate Teddy Altman / Hulkling. The main Avengers group reforms, with the Young Avengers continuing to operate. Billy and Teddy begin dating.

==== Civil War ====
During the Civil War, Billy and Tommy plan to look for Wanda. S.H.I.E.L.D. arrests the Young Avengers. Falcon and Captain America intercept the S.H.I.E.L.D bus which is transporting the prisoners and Wiccan teleports the team out of the situation, into the Resistance Fighters base of operations.

When the Runaways try to stay out of the conflict, they barely escape from the government forces. Hearing of this development in the news, the Young Avengers decide to help the Runaways even though Captain America vetoes the plan. Wiccan uses his magic to locate and teleport to the Runaways. However, the Runaways believe that the Young Avengers have come to capture them and a fight ensues until Eli Bradley (Patriot) convinces Nico Minoru to stop the hostilities. The two teams are later attacked by Noh-Varr, who captures Wiccan and Hulkling. Hulkling is vivisected while in prison, with Wiccan nearly killing the prison's warden in retaliation.

Wiccan and the other imprisoned anti-Registration heroes are eventually freed in a raid led by Captain America. This liberation is made possible largely by Teddy's shape-shifting ability, which allows him to mimic Hank Pym's retinal and voice patterns, and thereby release all the prisoners from their cells.

Billy is shown to be a member of the Initiative, along with Hulkling. It is later revealed that some, perhaps most, of the Young Avengers did not actually join The Initiative or even register. They were registered by their Earth-A counterparts; both Wiccan and Hulkling are seen complaining about being registered to their "A Selves".

==== The Search for the Scarlet Witch ====
Wiccan and Speed later search for the Scarlet Witch following the events of Civil War. While Billy and Tommy both search for Wanda (referring to her as "Mom") they encounter Master Pandemonium, who recognizes Wiccan's magic as that of the Scarlet Witch and further explains their original history as the Scarlet Witch's children. However, he likens the boys' search for their past and Wanda to his own former life as rising actor, and tells them that their past was "darkness and chaos" and advises them that they should embrace who they are now. This appears to have satisfied Wiccan, who calls off his search for now, deciding that he is happy with the person he is and the people in his life.

==== Dark Reign and Siege ====
Wiccan gathers the Young Avengers together at the Avengers Mansion to respond to wave of supernatural chaos caused by Chthon. The team is turned to stone by Chthon's magic, except for Vision and Stature, who arrive too late.

Doctor Strange, the former Sorcerer Supreme and one of Marvel's premiere magic users, visits Wiccan to discuss his potential candidacy and ability to assume the position as the new Sorcerer Supreme. When the Hood finds Strange and engages him in magical combat, Wiccan aids him, contrary to Strange's orders to flee. Wiccan and Strange teleport to the New Avengers seeking help.

During the Siege of Asgard, Wiccan and the other Young Avengers were among those who answered Steve Rogers' assembly call for the purpose of overthrowing Norman Osborn's regime and defending Asgard.

==== The Children's Crusade ====
During a fight between a group of nuclear-armed Sons of the Serpent and the Young Avengers, Wiccan loses control of his powers and renders the entire group of terrorists comatose. The Avengers arrive and take Wiccan to their base stating that they want to examine his full capabilities, concerned that, like the Scarlet Witch, if he were to lose control of his powers, he could cause massive devastation. In the process, the Avengers reveal to the team that the Scarlet Witch, having had a mental break after losing her twin sons, killed several of her teammates, changed all of reality into House of M, and then was responsible for the depowering and deaths of millions of mutants. Wiccan reiterates his belief that he and Speed are truly the transposed souls of the Scarlet Witch's children and that she may not have been purposefully behind those events. Seeing the Avengers' and his friends' distrust of the Scarlet Witch and their discomfort with him due to uncertainty of his powers, he storms out, only to find that Captain America has informed his parents of what occurred during the early battle. Wiccan, accompanied by Hulkling, goes with Captain America and is situated for observation. However, the other Young Avengers decide to break them out, urging Wiccan to search for the Scarlet Witch. By showing her that the children she lost may be alive and well, the Young Avengers believe that she may be cured of her illness and be able to reverse the damage she had done. In particular, Stature hopes that locating and curing the Scarlet Witch could mean a chance at reviving her father. Immediately, Magneto arrives, stating that he wants Wiccan and Speed to finally know him as their grandfather.

However the Avengers intercede in the conversation and go into battle with Magneto and the Young Avengers. Wiccan is attacked by Wolverine and is then convinced by Ms. Marvel that this is a battle they cannot win. Wiccan then teleports his team and Magneto to Mount Wundagore, leaving the Avengers behind, who decide to let Wiccan find the Scarlet Witch so they can take care of both of them at once. Upon arriving, Patriot lashes out in anger at Wiccan, but Hawkeye intercedes and decides that they will look for the Scarlet Witch together. Patriot then confides with Hawkeye that he believes the Avengers are right and that they need to go back. However Hawkeye tells Patriot that he needs to pick a side and walks away angry. The Vision confides his fear that Stature may sacrifice herself to bring back her father, and that that is something that neither he nor her father would want. Finally, the group reaches the grave of Magda, Wanda's mother, and Magneto tells the children about the Scarlet Witch and Quicksilver's birth. Wiccan then reaches out with his magic and finds the Scarlet Witch in the town, and Speed goes to investigate, only to run into Quicksilver. Quicksilver then threatens Magneto and kidnaps Wiccan. Speed however catches up with Quicksilver and the two race, with Wiccan being carried by Quicksilver the whole time. Eventually, Quicksilver decides that the only way to stop his father and get Wiccan to help him find his sister is to kill Magneto. He fashions out stakes using fence posts and runs back to the village, throwing wooden stakes at Magneto, who dodges them. In the process, Quicksilver seemingly impales Wanda, who is discovered to be a Doombot, and that Doctor Doom has the real Scarlet Witch.

That night, everyone, Magneto and Quicksilver included, debates over invading Latveria to retrieve the Scarlet Witch, and they decide to sleep on it until the morning. Wiccan secretly leaves the group and is in the middle of a spell to teleport himself to Latveria. Quicksilver interrupts him, pointing out their similarities and again trying to get Wiccan to help him. However, Hulkling arrives with the rest of the Young Avengers, threatening Quicksilver and reprimanding Wiccan. Meanwhile, the Avengers meet with Wonder Man, hoping to use him to find Wanda and Wiccan. Simon, however, refuses and decides to go and find Wanda himself and help bring her back. Late that night, Wiccan writes a note for Hulkling expressing his love and apologizing for leaving for Latveria alone. Wiccan then teleports to Doom's castle and disguises himself as the Scarlet Witch to gain access. He is escorted by Doombots to a room where he is then assaulted by an amnesiac Scarlet Witch. Wiccan tells Wanda that he plans to rescue her, omitting that he is her son. However, Wanda states that there is no need for that as she is about to be married. Doctor Doom then arrives to tell Wiccan that it is he whom Wanda will marry, and then attacks Wiccan.

Wiccan tries to tell Wanda about her past life as the Scarlet Witch, but Doctor Doom knocks him unconscious during the battle before Wiccan can finish. Later, Doom tells Wiccan that Wanda came to him, and although he does not understand how, he has truly fallen in love with Wanda. Later, Wanda comes to see Wiccan asking him to tell her everything about the Scarlet Witch before she marries Doom. In the meantime, Magneto and the Young Avengers plan to invade Doom's castle in order to get Wiccan back, but are stopped by Wonder Man, and the Avengers who followed him secretly. A battle ensues, and Wolverine goes to find Wanda and Wiccan to kill them, but is stopped by Iron Lad, who states that the future depends on Wiccan's survival.

Eventually Wanda recovers her memory and powers. Billy asks her to use her magic to determine whether or not they are truly mother and son. It becomes clear that they are, and Wanda begs Billy's forgiveness. Mother and child embrace lovingly and weep for joy. Wanda is now determined to undo the harm she did, and restore the mutants. The first beneficiary is Rictor.

However, the X-Men intervene, and as the Avengers arrive, the two teams fight. Wanda teleports herself and the Young Avengers back to Latveria. Wiccan decides to help Doctor Doom and Wanda cast a spell to give the mutants back their powers. However, Patriot refuses to trust Doctor Doom, and shoots an explosive arrow at him to stop the spell, which results in Doctor Doom attaining Wanda's reality altering powers. The new Doctor Doom teleports the team after Wanda begs him to relinquish the power. Doctor Doom appears in front of the X-Men, the Avengers, X-Factor, the Young Avengers, and Wanda, and a battle ensues ending in Cassie's death. Wanda and Wiccan manage to drain the power from Doctor Doom, and he leaves. Iron Lad wants to take back Cassie's body into the timestream to find someone who could bring her back, but the Vision stops him and is subsequently destroyed. Wanda leaves to find herself, the X-Men go back to Utopia, and the Young Avengers decide to disband. Wiccan blames himself for everything that has happened, and ends up falling into a depression, but with Hulkling proposing to him the two get back into costume with Hawkeye and Speed (Patriot moved to Arizona) and Captain America makes the team full-fledged Avengers. In a one-shot issue of Children's Crusade: Young Avengers, a flash to the future shows Billy wearing the uniform of Doctor Strange, implying he has attained the mantle of Sorcerer Supreme at some point in the future.

==== Battle against Mother ====
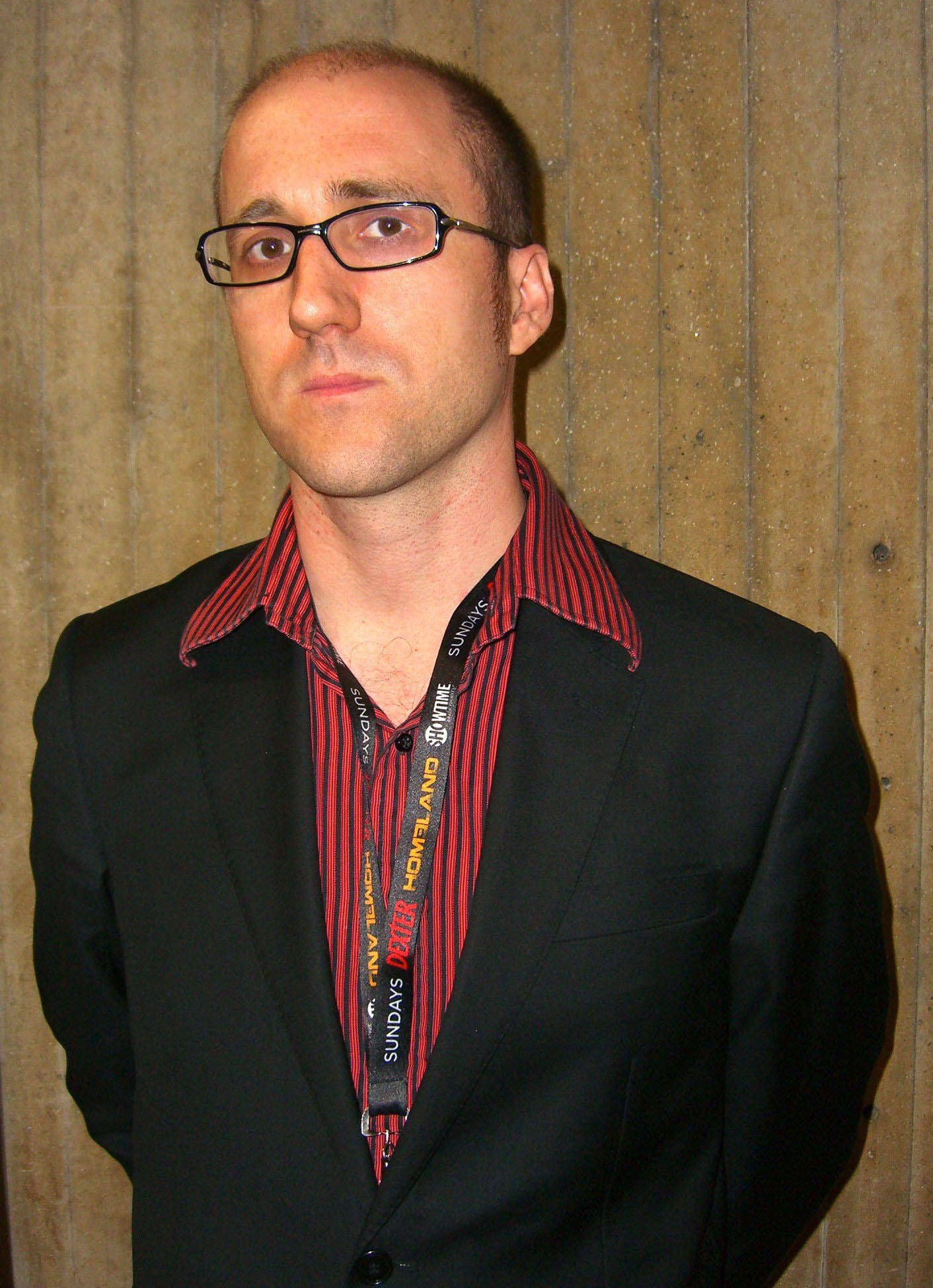
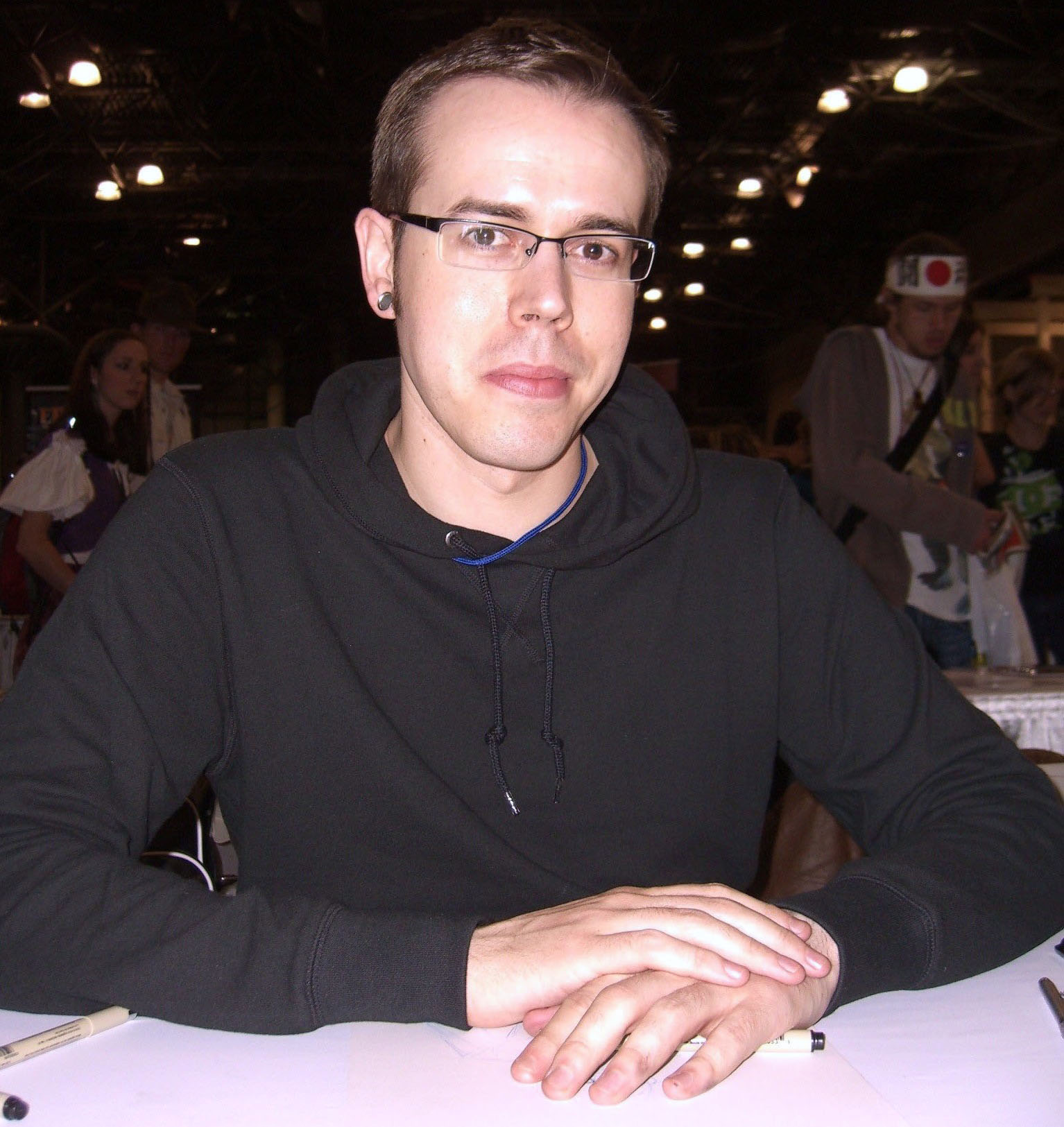
The creators of volume 2: Kieron Gillen (left) and Jamie McKelvie (right)

Some time later, it is revealed that the group went their separate ways due to their several losses. Billy and Teddy are living together with Billy's parents. Billy discovers though that Teddy has broken their promise to give up being superheroes by fighting crime at night. After getting into an argument, Billy tries to make it up to Teddy by shuffling through different realities to find one identical to theirs at the moment before Teddy's mother died. Billy finds this moment and brings Teddy's mother back to life. However, the Mother soon displays strange abilities and attempts to kill Billy and Teddy, with somehow Billy's parents not noticing. After escaping her, they run into Loki, who due to recent events, is a child again. He tells them that the Mother is not actually Teddy's mom, but a parasite from the multiverse who takes the guise of whatever travelers are looking for. Due to its strange abilities, adults are oblivious to whatever happens around the Mother, and any parents around them become part of her personal army (save for Scarlet Witch, who is able to resist, but still remains oblivious to what is going on, as with the rest of the Avengers). The three soon reunite with Kate, who has been having one night stands with Noh-Varr, while joined by America Chavez. Discovering that any parents around the group fall prey to Mother's spell, the group uses Noh-Varr's ship to leave Earth, while Loki will train Billy in magic to hopefully reverse what he has done. On their travels, Loki talks to Teddy about Billy's powers, saying that it's highly unlikely that some attractive alien prince would just happen to find Billy, happen to be gay, and happen to fall in love with him. Teddy begins to wonder if he was indeed created by Billy to fill a hole in his life. Soon they are summoned back to Earth by former X-Men member David Alleyne, who has been working a temp job with Tommy. According to him, a mysterious figure wearing Patriot's old outfit kidnapped Tommy, and he requires their help to find him. Apparently, Tommy was brought to another reality, and America uses her powers to let them travel between worlds. The group hop from universe to universe for a while, eventually finding a universe of adorable creatures worshipping Billy as a god called the Demiurge. Loki and America have been trying to hide this from Billy for a while, but they reveal that one day he shall become an entity known as the Demiurge, and during his time as this being, will change the laws of magic in every universe and every time period, past, present, and future. However, the group is soon ambushed by Mother while in between universes, and they become separated. When reuniting, Teddy tells Billy and what he and Loki discussed, and the two separate while on Earth. Teddy takes a break from the group, soon finding a support group for those wronged by the Young Avengers, apparently led by Mother. Mother kidnaps Teddy, and the Young Avengers prepare to save him. Loki develops a plan to have Billy access a fraction of the Demiurge's power, which should be enough to kill Mother. Thinking they will be outnumbered by the armies Mother has been amassing made up of other-universe versions of the group and the parents she has brainwashed, David calls every super-powered hero under the age of 23 to help them fight, while all the world's older heroes and villains remain unaware that any of this is happening. Loki, however, tells Billy that Loki can only help if he is at full power, and Billy uses a spell to restore Loki to a young adult. Loki and Billy prepare to give Billy near-unlimited power while the battle in central park begins between Mother's army and the world's teenage and young adult heroes. Kate, America, Noh-Varr, and David save Teddy, Teddy finding Billy on the battlefield, who is unable to access his power. Teddy tells him it is okay, and the two kiss, this being the spark Billy needed to access the Demiurge. Billy uses his moment of power to successfully kill Mother, getting rid of her spell and any trace of her through the multiverse. Billy reunites with his parents, introducing them to the group, though Loki has vanished. Later, a party is being held at a club by a mysterious benefactor, which the group and all the heroes who fought in the battle attend. Here, Billy and Teddy are shown to be once again in a happy relationship. The Young Avengers soon get ready to leave, save for Loki, who was watching from a distance, and was the benefactor for the party. The group leaves, as Loki reminisces while looking at a selfie they all took during their journeys together.

==== New Avengers ====
Loki and America's prophecy comes true soon after Billy and Teddy are recruited by Sunspot to become members of the New Avengers, a team working alongside A.I.M. A group of Kree-Skrull hybrids arrive on Earth, intending for Teddy to finally ascend to his position as the Emperor who will unite the two warring races. Unable to stop their teleportation ray, Billy goes with him to their planet whilst the rest of the team attempt a rescue. Upon reaching the planet, they discover that one of the hybrids has been taken over by a ghost wizard named Moridun. He is killed by Teddy who resolves to return and take his place as Emperor when he is ready. Unbeknownst to the New Avengers, Moridun was not destroyed and has actually taken over Billy, who changes his codename to Demiurge. Under the control of Moridun, Billy begins acting weird, suggesting that they should kill some of the thieves they are fighting. It is only when a group of future avengers travel back in time to warn them does Teddy realise what has happened. Despite the future avengers preparing to kill Billy, Teddy encourages him to fight and he successfully drives Moridun out of his body, averting the huge amount of death that was to be caused. Later, Sunspot goes rogue, separating A.I.M. from the New Avengers and abandoning the team.

During the second superhero civil war, Wiccan joins forces with several other sorcerers led by Doctor Strange to destroy a Celestial. Although initially doubtful of his right to fight alongside such powerful magic users, his confidence is restored by Scarlet Witch. He is contacted by Sunspot, who convinces Billy, Teddy and Squirrel Girl to reform the New Avengers and work alongside A.I.M for one final mission. Wiccan teleports the trio onto a S.H.I.E.L.D. Helicarrier to aid in the rescue of Songbird before regrouping with Sunspot and facing off against the Maker and his Revengers. After this, the New Avengers permanently disband and, as a thank you, Sunspot gifts Wiccan and Hulkling an apartment overlooking Central Park.

==== War of the Realms ====
When Dark Elves invade Manhattan, Billy is summoned by Loki, who is initially disguised as Kate Bishop, to a drag bar where he attempts to convince him to side with Malekith in the war. Loki tries to gain Billy's forgiveness for attempting to manipulate him and steal the power of the demiurge when they both served as Young Avengers but he refuses, telling him it is not his place as he was not the only one wronged. While fighting Malekith's forces, Billy and Teddy see Loki's murder at the hands of Laufey and silently embrace.

==== Strikeforce ====
Billy suddenly finds himself in a medical facility handling biological weaponry alongside Angela, Spider-Woman, Spectrum and Winter Soldier with no memory of how he came to be there. He is taken into custody with the others and is greeted by Blade, who explains that the group were taken over by mysterious shapeshifters and framed for their actions. Angela quickly identifies these shapeshifters as Asgardian and the team track them to their base. Wiccan is reluctant to join the mission, believing that they are doing the wrong thing by keeping the Avengers in the dark about their mission but he is convinced that it is best if only a small group of people know about the shapeshifters as their power comes from people having knowledge of them. The group is attacked by Daimon Hellstrom and, assuming he is a shapeshifter in disguise, Blade kills him before receiving a phone call from Satana who explains that her brother is with her in Las Vegas and is acting strangely. The team go to Satana's club and Wiccan is tasked with destroying the shapeshifter but stresses that his powers do not allow him to resurrect Hellstrom. Destroying the shapeshifter causes it to burst into a swarm of smaller creatures who capture Wiccan, take his form and send the fake Wiccan to meet with Hulkling. The shapeshifters keep the real Wiccan in a cell where they reveal that they have also captured Doctor Doom and command Wiccan to use his powers to gain Doom's secrets. Due to his history with Doom, Wiccan is apprehensive but quickly learns that they have captured a Doombot and have no idea that it is not the real Doctor Doom. Wiccan animates the Doombot and uses it to escape. The team retreat to a safehouse where Wiccan confronts the newly resurrected Hellstrom about why he was working with the shapeshifters.

==== Empyre ====
Teddy later accepts his heritage and the mantle of "Dorrek VIII" at the cost of leaving Billy, becomes the new ruler of the Kree–Skrull Alliance, upon which he begins preparations to invade Earth for "the final war". When Hulkling had to break ties with Wiccan, he states that he'll be on Earth when he returns.

When Captain Marvel and Human Torch are teleported to his apartment by M'ur-Ginn, Wiccan is informed of Hulkling's actions. Wiccan states that he knows Hulkling and that the one they just encountered is an imposter. He also reveals, that they had a courthouse wedding right before Hulkling left Earth to rule the Alliance. On the Kree/Skrull Alliance's flagship, Wiccan arrives with Human Torch, Captain Marvel, and the real Hulkling. As Human Torch burns the Inhibitor Mask off of Hulkling, Captain Marvel uses the Universal Weapon on the imposter, who states that the Pyre's trigger has been activated. Wiccan teleports the Human Torch and Captain Marvel to the sun and keeps them alive, while they use their abilities to "tame the sun". This buys Tony Stark and Mister Fantastic enough time to stop the sun from exploding.

Teddy and Billy marry a second time. The wedding is elaborate and involves a mix of Jewish and Skrull/Kree customs. Most of their former teammates and the heroes that helped the Alliance during the events of "Empyre" attended. During the ceremony Wiccan is crowned prince consort and court wizard of the Kree/Skrull alliance.

== Powers and abilities ==
As Wiccan, Billy Kaplan is able to manipulate magical energies which allows him to alter and warp reality at will. While patterning himself after Thor in the guise of Asgardian, Billy limited himself entirely to flight and lightning-based spells. By stating an intent and focusing on the outcome, Wiccan is capable of a variety of feats, including, but not limited to tracking and locating others, illusionary disguises, tearing down force-fields, mass teleportation, concussive blasts, enchantments, astral projection, and telekinetic force beams.

In the past, Billy had to be able to hear his spells for them to be successful, but this is no longer the case. He has consistently been able to create force fields, teleport others, and generate lightning and force blasts with little or no effort.

Wiccan was one of the many possible candidates for the title of Sorcerer Supreme, and has been described by the Vision as "one of the most powerful mages on the planet." Doctor Strange has partnered with a time-traveling Wiccan from the future and was confirmed that he succeeds Strange being the Sorcerer Supreme. Loki predicted that Wiccan will evolve into a god by his own right one day.

In Young Avengers vol. 2, Loki reveals that Wiccan is destined to become a powerful magical entity known as the Demiurge who will rewrite the rules of magic. He briefly achieves this form, and is able to view the past, present and future, as well as freely alter the universe. However, deciding that he is not ready to wield this power, he relinquishes it and reverts to his human form.

In Doctor Strange and the Sorcerers Supreme, Stephen Strange travels to a dimension in which past and future Sorcerer Supremes are all gathered. Billy is revealed to become the Sorcerer Supreme in the future after Stephen.

== Analogy to the Arthurian legend ==
Several comics showed stark similarities between Wiccan and Hulkling and the mythological figures Merlin and King Arthur. Both Arthur (at least in one popular version of the legend) and Hulkling grew up unaware of their destiny. Both are prophesiesed to unite their people and bring peace, have a strong wizard on their side, use magical swords and become the beloved kings of a big kingdom/empire.

The first time this connection was made was when Hulkling was a member of A.I.M. He was kidnapped by the "Knights of the Infinite", an analogy to the Arthurian "Knights of the Round Table" and told about his destiny as prophesied ruler of the a united Kree/Skrull Empire. He was then told to get a sword out of a light beam and pronounced "King of the Space", an obvious adaptation of the famous Arthurian legend of the sword in the stone. Hulkling even named his sword "Excelsior", King Arthur's sword being "Excalibur". Two of the knights seem to be named after characters of the Arthurian Mythos, Lan-Zarr (after Lancelot) and Mur-G'nn (after Morgana, also a magic-user). There is also M'ryn the Magus (named after Merlin), an old magic-user, who spoke the prophecy.

It is again heavily referenced during the Empyre event; Wiccan even says "Like Merlin? I'll take it!" after being crowned court wizard of the Kree/Skrull-Alliance.

== Relationships ==
Exchanges between Wiccan and Hulkling shows that the two teens are definitely lovers. Allan Heinberg confirmed this speculation, stating that his intent was to reveal the relationship, and he was surprised that his subtle clues were picked up on so quickly.

Kate advises that Asgardian should change his codename to avoid puns regarding his sexuality when the press discovers that he is in a relationship with Hulkling, implying that the others already knew the two are gay. Kate, along with Stature, suggested the codename "Wiccan", which Billy adopts.

When the team agrees to give an interview to Kat Farrell, Jessica Jones warns Billy and Teddy that Farrell will probably ask if the rumors about them are true. After some deliberation, the two decide to tell Farrell, with Teddy adding, "Why should Northstar have all the fun?"

In Young Avengers Presents #3, Hulkling and Wiccan's romantic relationship is handled much more openly than previous issues. In it, they refer to one another as boyfriends. Speed also asks if their relationship is "getting hot and heavy" and jokes that Billy and Teddy would have a disastrous "mixed marriage" due to Teddy's alien heritage.

In the aftermath of The Children's Crusade, Billy falls into a months-long depression, watching from the sidelines as New York is turned into "Spider Island" and the Human Torch is resurrected. Teddy is able to bring Billy back "out of the dark" by proposing to him.

In Young Avengers Vol. 2, Billy and Teddy's relationship is tested due to the meddling of Loki, who plants the idea in Teddy's head that he is not real and was unknowingly created by Billy using his reality warping powers. Teddy is kissed by Prodigy. The couple reconcile at the conclusion of the storyline and are last seen happily dancing together at Marvel Boy's party.

In New Avengers, the hybrids refer to Teddy as Emperor Dorrek VIII and Billy as his "prince consort". A flashforward to possible future 20XX shows an older Billy and Teddy living happily together with a daughter, Katie.

Hulkling became a key player in Empyre, Marvel's summer 2020 crossover event. A one-shot, Lords of Empyre: Emperor Hulkling, written by Chip Zdarsky and queer author Anthony Oliveira, fills in some of the backstory of how Hulkling was called on to become emperor and his relationship with Wiccan. As well as setting Hulkling up for the Empyre event, Emperor Hulkling also shows the importance of their relationship to each other. It was important to co-author Oliveira that the one-shot depict the everyday "queer life" that Hulkling lives and to expand on his character, who is often "left on the bench" while "Wiccan is off saving the world". Oliveira had previously shown the couple having a queer everyday life with Wiccan going to a drag brunch with Loki, with Hulkling largely lounging on the sofa at home, eating cereal from a bowl balanced on Excelsior, his Star Sword. While Wiccan is off on Strikeforce duties, the events of Emperor Hulkling start at a drag bar, where Hulkling is drinking with fellow Young Avengers Prodigy and Speed, who are also depicted as a gay couple. After Hulkling battles purist Skrull extremists in the drag bar, he and Wiccan spend time together before boarding the Imperial Fleet, where Wiccan enchants Hulkling's engagement ring so he can teleport to Hulkling's location. Later in Emperor Hulkling, Hulkling is forced to denounce Wiccan before privately reassuring Wiccan that he did not mean it and "had [his] fingers crossed".

== Origin of name ==
Asked about Billy's codename, Heinberg said "It turns out that code names are the trickiest part of creating new characters. When Kate suggests 'Wiccan' to Billy in Young Avengers #6, she, like me, was not thinking in terms of the specific religious practice of Wicca, but rather attempting to find a suitable counterpart for the word 'witch.' It was certainly not my intention to offend anyone with 'Wiccan.' And since adopting the code name, rest assured Billy has been doing his Wiccan homework, so keep reading..." During their time fighting the Mother, Loki eventually questions Wiccan about his codename. He complains that since he is a pagan deity, he takes some offence to its use, and jokingly states that he has a list of better names.

In the pages of New Avengers, Power Man questions Billy over his choice of codename. Although he explains that he has been researching the religion of Wicca, he admits that it is not his faith. Victor then suggests that he should change it (with Teddy begging him not to revert to Asgardian). Billy later changes his name to Demiurge whilst under the control of the ghost wizard Moridun.

== Reception ==
=== Critical reception ===
Heinberg reported that when the relationship between Wiccan and Hulkling was initially suspected before its confirmation, most fans were supportive, with minimal negative reaction. Wiccan and Hulkling have been called "Marvel's most prominent gay couple," and received praise for showing diversity and progression in comics. While accepting the Corporate Vanguard Award for Marvel Entertainment at the Los Angeles LGBT Center, Marvel's VP of Animation Development, Cort Lane, cited Wiccan and Hulkling's relationship as one of his favorite story lines featuring LGBT characters.

Andrew Wheeler of ComicsAlliance wrote, "Something about the sweetness of the love between Hulkling and Wiccan, aka Billy and Teddy, has struck a strong chord with readers looking for a little romance to melt their hearts. After dealing with time travellers, alien invasions and mad mutants, their story stands out as an It Gets Better for the superhero set." M.N Negus of CBR.com referred to Hulkling and Wiccan as "one of Marvel's most iconic LGBT+ couples," writing, "Wiccan and Hulkling have been together for nearly two decades, and are now living happily ever after. Their recent exploits are depicted in Hulkling and Wiccan Infinity Comic #1 (by writer Josh Trujillo and artists Jodi Nishijima, Matt Milla, and VC's Ariana Maher), in which they even explore a life without the other. Throughout their struggles as individuals and as a couple, they manage to come out on top with their bond becoming stronger than before. Their coupling has withstood the test of time and truly become an iconic development in Marvel comic books." Eric Diaz of Nerdist stated, "Marvel Comics took a big and necessary step into the 21st century today, as they announced the very first marriage between two LGBTQ superheroes will soon take place in their pages. The event occurs in Empyre: Avengers Aftermath #1, which will feature the union of longtime superhero couple Hulkling and Wiccan. Both heroes are famous for being founding members of the Young Avengers."

=== Accolades ===
- In 2012, ComicsAlliance ranked Wiccan and Hulkling 6th in their " "50 Comics and Characters that Resonate with LGBT Readers" list.
- In 2018, Nerdist included Wiccan in their "12 Avengers from the Comics Who We'd Still Love to See on the Big Screen" list.
- In 2021, Screen Rant ranked Wiccan 1st in their "10 Most Powerful Members Of The Young Avengers" list and ranked Wiccan and Hulkling 2nd in their "10 Best Relationships in Avengers Comics" list.
- In 2021, Comic Book Resources (CBR) ranked Wiccan 1st in their "10 Most Powerful Young Avengers" list.
- In 2022, CBR ranked Wiccan and Hulkling 5th in their "10 Best Marvel Couples" list and 7th in their "10 Healthiest Marvel Couples" list.

== Literary reception ==
=== Volumes ===
==== Hulkling & Wiccan – 2022 ====
Hannah Rose of CBR.com called Hulkling and Wiccan #1 an "interesting love story," writing, "Instead of budding romance, it tells the story of a pair of newly-weds who have known each other for quite a while. By the time this story begins, Hulkling and Wiccan are already enjoying domestic bliss. But before they can settle into life as a married couple, they're forced to adjust to the responsibilities of their new royal positions. It's clear from their serious discussions and their playful banter that these two care for each other. But, Hulkling and Wiccan #1 reminds the audience that Teddy and Billy are both very young, very insecure, and very uncertain about their place in space. Their arguments and insecurities are realistically and excellently written." Jenna Anderson of ComicBook.com gave Hulkling and Wiccan #1 a grade of 3 out of 5, saying, "One of the most beloved LGBTQ+ couples in Marvel's arsenal gets the spotlight again, with a one-shot (reprinting the first portion of the digital Infinity Comic of the same name) that puts Wiccan and Hulkling's newfound married life to the test. To say any more beyond that would spoil (and probably complicate) the specifics of what is laid out, with the two being put through a crucible that will only make them further realize their bond. Some fans of the couple will surely love it, while some won't — but there's definitely a fun sense of artistry on display, particularly with Jodi Nishijima's art and Matt Milla's dreamy colors. Diehard fans of Billy and Teddy will surely want to add this to their collection, but this isn't a must-read on a larger level."

== Other versions ==
=== Age of Revelation ===
A potential future version of Wiccan appears in Age of Revelation. He attempts to stop the spread of the X-Virus, but is attacked by Revelation, who renders him mute and unable to cast spells by speaking. Hulkling takes Wiccan under his care, having failed to find a cure for him.

=== Avengers Fairy Tales ===
In the one-shot Avengers Fairy Tales, Wiccan appears as the March Hare in an adaptation of Alice's Adventures in Wonderland.

=== Exiles: Days of Then And Now ===
In a reality where after the Hulk was jettisoned into space and discovered by Annihilus, killing him and taking the Annihilation Wave to Earth; Wiccan appears as one of the few remaining superhumans and a member of Quentin Quire's Exiles.

=== The Last Avengers Story ===
In a one-shot story about the final Avengers story, Billy and Tommy grew up as the children of the Vision and the Scarlet Witch. As a child, Billy witnessed the accidental murder of his mother by his uncle, Quicksilver. Her death eventually caused Billy to become a villain, calling himself the Grim Reaper. Unlike Earth-616, Tommy inherited his mother's mystical abilities, with Billy's powers being unspecified. As the Grim Reaper, Billy wields a scythe that he can summon to him at will.

=== Battle of the Atom ===
In Battle of the Atom, Billy appears as Earth's Sorcerer Supreme and a member of the future X-Men.

=== House of M ===
In House of M, Wiccan and his twin brother are the twins of Wanda Magnus.

== In other media ==
=== Marvel Cinematic Universe ===
Billy Maximoff and William Kaplan appear in media set in the Marvel Cinematic Universe (MCU).

- Billy first appears in the miniseries WandaVision, portrayed by Baylen Bielitz as a five-year-old and Julian Hillard as a ten-year-old. This version was created by Wanda Maximoff via chaos magic when she trapped Westview, New Jersey within a "Hex" and is named after William Shakespeare. Throughout the miniseries, Billy and his twin brother Tommy age rapidly until their powers manifest and Agatha Harkness kidnaps them in an attempt to steal Wanda's magic. After rescuing them, Wanda undoes the hex, ending Billy and Tommy's existence. In a post-credits scene, she hears them crying for help, which is later revealed to have come from their multiversal counterparts in Multiverse of Madness (see below).
- A variant of Billy Maximoff from Earth-838 appears in Doctor Strange in the Multiverse of Madness, portrayed by Hillard. Additionally, statues of Wiccan from Earth-616 appear in Mount Wundagore.
- William Kaplan appears in Agatha All Along, portrayed by Joe Locke. Born and raised in Eastview, he dies in a car crash as Billy's soul enters his body after Wanda's undoing of the hex. As he struggles with amnesia and adjusts to life with William's parents, Billy seeks out Agatha to enter the Witches' Road and find Tommy, unknowingly creating it with his chaos magic in the process. During their journey, they place Tommy's soul in another dying teenager before Death tries to take Billy, but Agatha sacrifices herself to save him before returning as a ghost to help him find Tommy.
- Billy Maximoff appears in the VisionQuest episode, "Forever", portrayed again by Joe Locke.Billy is in New Jersey and briefly reunites with Tommy, who inhabits Thomas Shepherd's body, through an astral projection. Tommy asks him to come and help save Vision, although it might take Billy some time to arrive and provide that help. Billy arrives in time, and with Tommy’s help, reactivates Vision and reunites with him.

=== Video games ===
- Wiccan makes a cameo appearance in Doctor Strange's ending in Ultimate Marvel vs. Capcom 3.
- Wiccan appears as an enhanced costume for Scarlet Witch in Marvel Heroes, voiced by Kyle Hebert.
- Wiccan appears as an unlockable playable character in Lego Marvel's Avengers, voiced by J. P. Karliak.
- Wiccan appears as an unlockable playable character in Marvel Avengers Academy.
- Wiccan appears as an unlockable playable character in Lego Marvel Super Heroes 2.
- Wiccan appears as an unlockable playable character in Marvel: Future Fight.
- Wiccan appears in Marvel Snap.

== See also ==
- LGBT themes in comics
