= Tini Howard =

American comic book writer

- Howard at Dragon Con in 2026
- Born: 1985 (age 40–41); Van Nuys, California
- Occupation: Comic book writer
- Website: www.tinihoward.com

Tini Howard (born 1985) is an American comic book writer. She is best known for her work on X-Men titles, namely Excalibur as well as Boom! Studios's Power Rangers titles, and Catwoman at DC Comics.

== Early life ==
Tini Howard was born in Van Nuys, California.

== Career ==
As a winner of the 2013 Top Cow Talent Hunt, Tini Howard's first comics credit was 2014's Magdalena: Seventh Sacrament. She then continued working with Top Cow Productions. She has since been a writer on comic book iterations of properties like Rick and Morty, Power Rangers and Barbie, as well as created comic books like Assassinistas and Euthanauts, which were published by IDW.

In 2019 at the C2E2 "Women of Marvel" panel, it was announced Howard had signed an exclusive contract with Marvel Comics. Since then, she has worked on the company writing Excalibur (as part of Dawn of X), Strikeforce, Death's Head, Thanos and Age of Conan: Belit.

In July 2025, it was announced that she would write a new book for Boom! Studios called Marian Heretic, about a witch hunter nun, that would start coming out in October 2025 and would be illustrated by Joe Jaro. The first issue sold out and got a second printing.

Tini Howard appeared on the Jeopardy! episode aired April 17, 2026. She was defeated by returning champion Jamie Ding in his 26th consecutive game, finishing in third place.

== Bibliography ==
=== Comics ===
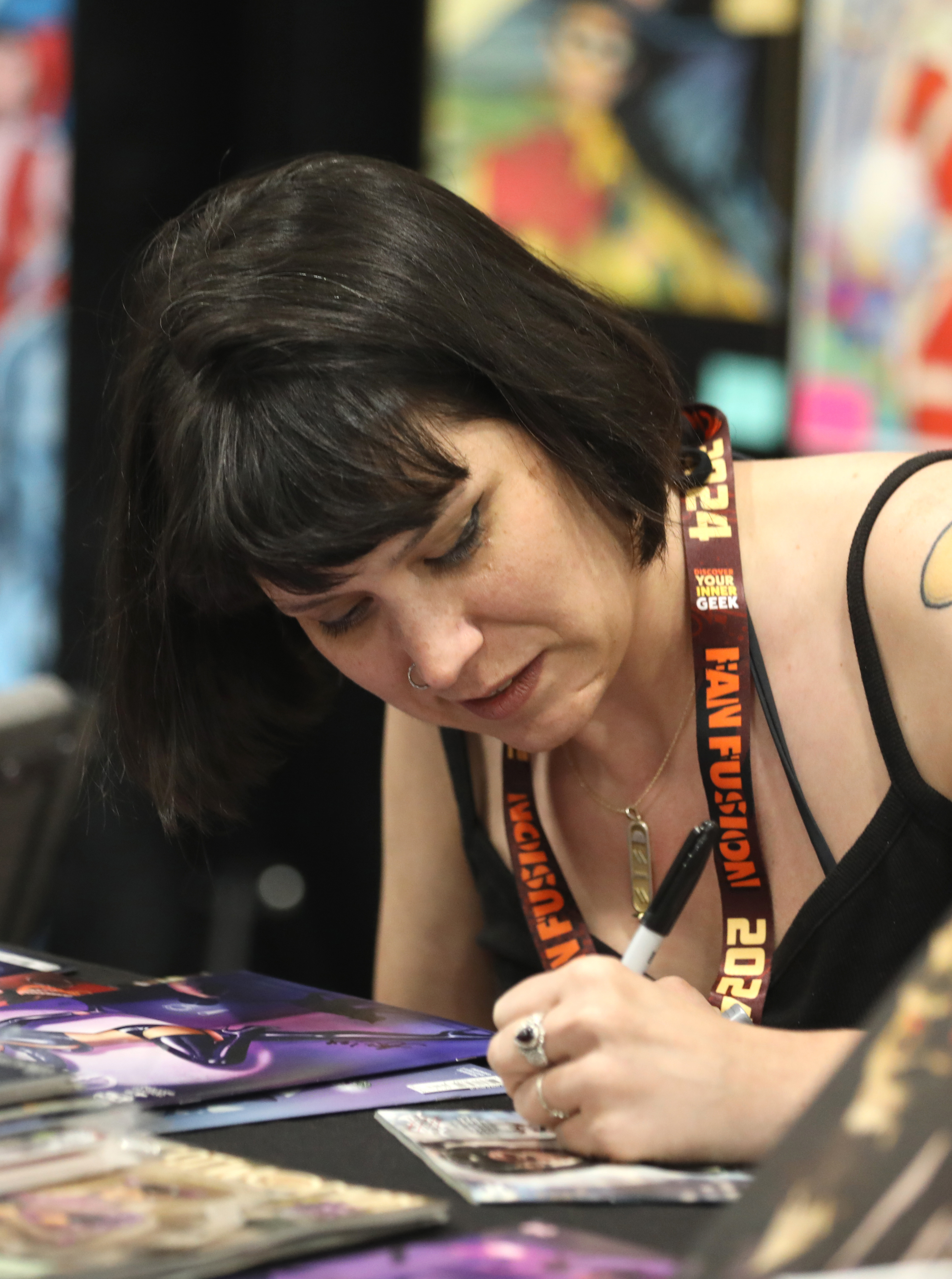
Howard at the 2024 Phoenix Fan Fusion

DC Comics

- Catwoman (vol. 5) #39–68 (illustrated by Nico Leon, Sami Basri, Stefano Raffaele, January 2022–September 2024)
  - Catwoman Vol. 1: Dangerous Liaisons (collecting Catwoman (vol. 5) #39-44, illustrated by Nico Leon & Bengal, trade paperback, 160 pages, 2022, ISBN 1-77951-728-9)
  - Catwoman Vol. 2: Cat International (collecting Catwoman (vol. 5) #45-50, illustrated by Nico Leon & Sami Basri, trade paperback, 176 pages, 2023, ISBN 1-77952-032-8)
  - Catwoman Vol. 3: Duchess of Gotham (collecting Catwoman (vol. 5) #51-56, illustrated by Nico Leon & Sami Basri, trade paperback, 176 pages, 2023, ISBN 1-77952-332-7)
  - Batman/Catwoman: The Gotham War (collecting Batman/Catwoman: The Gotham War: Battle Lines, Batman (vol. 3) #137-138, Catwoman (vol. 5) #57-58, and Batman/Catwoman: The Gotham War: Scorched Earth, co-written with Chip Zdarsky, illustrated by Jorge Jimenez and Nico Leon, trade paperback, 272 pages, 2024, ISBN 1779525982)
  - Catwoman Vol. 4: Nine Lives (collection Catwoman (vol. 5) #59-68, illustrated by Stefano Raffaele and Nicolas Ignacio , trade paperback, 248 pages, 2024, ISBN 978-1-77952-500-0)
- Dark Crisis: World Without a Justice League – Wonder Woman #1 (illustrated by Leila del Duca, November 2022)
  - Dark Crisis: Worlds without a Justice League (collecting Dark Crisis: World Without a Justice League – Superman #1, Dark Crisis: World Without a Justice League – Green Lantern #1, Dark Crisis: World Without a Justice League – Wonder Woman #1, Dark Crisis: World Without a Justice League – Green Arrow #1, Dark Crisis: World Without a Justice League – Batman #1, hardcover, 176 pages, ISBN 978-1779524171)
- Harley Quinn (vol. 4) #28–43 (illustrated by Sweeney Boo, March 2023-September 2024)
  - Harley Quinn Vol. 1: Girl in a Crisis (collecting Harley Quinn (vol. 4) #28-32, illustrated by Sweeney Boo, trade paperback, 144 pages, 2024, ISBN 1-77952-823-X)
  - Harley Quinn Vol. 2: Eye Don't Like Me? (collecting Harley Quinn (vol. 4) #32-37, illustrated by Sweeney Boo, trade paperback, 200 pages, 2024, ISBN 978-1799504726)
  - Harley Quinn Vol. 3: Clown About Town (collecting Harley Quinn (vol. 4) #38-43, illustrated by Sweeney Boo, trade paperback, 200 pages, 2024, ISBN 978-1799500872)
- Knight Terrors: Catwoman #1-2 (illustrated by Leila Leiz, July-August 2023)
  - Knight Terrors: Dark Knightmares (collecting Knight Terrors: Batman #1-2, Knight Terrors: Catwoman #1-2, Knight Terrors: Detective Comics #1-2, Knight Terrors: Nightwing #1-2, and Knight Terrors: Robin #1-2, hardcover, 344 pages, ISBN 978-1779524652)
- Knight Terrors: Harley Quinn #1-2 (illustrated by Hayden Sherman, July-August 2023)
  - Knight Terrors: Knockturnal Creatures (collecting Knight Terrors: Harley Quinn #1-2, Knight Terrors: Poison Ivy #1-2, Knight Terrors: Punchline #1-2, and Knight Terrors: Zatanna #1-2, hardcover, 328 pages, ISBN 978-1779524690)
- Punchline: The Gotham Game #1-6 (co-written with Black Howard, illustrated by Gleb Melnikov, October 2022-March 2023)
  - Punchline: The Gotham Game (collecting Punchline: The Gotham Game #1-6, hardcover, ISBN 978-1779518361)
- Sirens: Love Hurts #1-3 (illustrated by Xanthe Bouma and Babs Tarr, April-June 2026)
- Tales of the Titans #2 (Illustrated by Eleonora Carlini, August 2023)
  - Tales of the Titans (collecting Tales of the Titans #1-4, trade paperback, ISBN ISBN 978-1779527141)

IDW Publishing

- Assassinistas (collecting Assassinistas #1–6, illustrated by Gilbert Hernandez, trade paperback, 152 pages, 2018, ISBN 1-68405-271-8)
- Euthanauts: Ground Control (collecting Euthanauts #1–5, illustrated by Nick Robles, trade paperback, 136 pages, 2019, ISBN 1-68405-404-4)

Marvel Comics

- Age of Conan: Bêlit: Queen of the Black Coast (collecting Age of Conan: Bêlit (vol. 1) #1–5, illustrated by Kate Niemczyk, trade paperback, 112 pages, 2019, ISBN 978-1-302-91695-4)
- Betsy Braddock: Captain Britain #1-5, illustrated by Vasco Georgiev (2023)
- Thanos: Zero Sanctuary (collecting Thanos (vol. 3) #1–6, illustrated by Ariel Olivetti, trade paperback, 144 pages, 2019, ISBN 1-302-91770-6)
- Death's Head: Clone Drive (collecting Death's Head #1–4, illustrated by Kei Zama, trade paperback, 112 pages, 2019, ISBN 1-302-91787-0)
- Strikeforce #1–9 (illustrated by Germán Peralta, Max Fiumara, Marika Cresta, Stacey Lee & Jacopo Camagni, September 2019–August 2020)
  - Strikeforce - Volume 1: Trust Me (collecting Strikeforce #1–5, illustrated by Germán Peralta, Max Fiumara, Marika Cresta, Stacey Lee & Jacopo Camagni, trade paperback, 112 pages, 2020, ISBN 1-302-92009-X)
  - Strikeforce - Volume 2: Fight Me (collecting Strikeforce #6-9 + The War of the Realms Strikeforce: The Dark Elf Realm #1, illustrated by Germán Peralta & Jacopo Camagni, trade paperback, 112 pages, 2020, ISBN 1-302-92010-3)
- Excalibur (vol. 4) #1–26 (illustrated by Marcus To & Wilton Santos, October 2019–January 2022)
  - Excalibur by Tini Howard: Volume 1 (collecting Excalibur (vol. 4) #1–6, illustrated by Marcus To, trade paperback, 176 pages, 2020, ISBN 1-302-91991-1)
  - Excalibur by Tini Howard: Volume 2 (collecting Excalibur (vol. 4) #7–11, illustrated by Marcus To & Wilton Santos, trade paperback, 112 pages, 2020, ISBN 1-302-92146-0)
  - Excalibur by Tini Howard: Volume 3 (collecting Excalibur (vol. 4) #16-21, illustrated by Marcus To, trade paperback, 160 pages, 2021, ISBN 978-1-302-92484-3)
- Empyre: X-Men #1 (with Jonathan Hickman, illustrated by Matteo Buffagni, July 2020)
- Knights of X #1-5, illustrated by Robert Quinn (2022)
- X of Swords: Creation #1 (with Jonathan Hickman, illustrated by Pepe Larraz, September 2020)
- X of Swords: Stasis #1 (with Jonathan Hickman, illustrated by Pepe Larraz and Mahmud Asrar, October 2020)
- X of Swords: Destruction #1 (with Jonathan Hickman, illustrated by Pepe Larraz, November 2020)

Oni Press

- Rick and Morty #33, #37–38, #41–42, #44–46, #50, #53–54 (December 2017–September 2019)
- Rick and Morty: Pocket Like You Stole It #1–5 (July–November 2017)
- Rick and Morty Presents: Unity #1 (#8 overall; November 2019)

== Awards and nominations ==
- 2013 Top Cow Talent Hunt — Winner
- 2024 GLAAD Media Award for Outstanding Comic Book — Betsy Braddock: Captain Britain (Marvel Comics) — Nomination
