= Outlawed (comics) =

2020–2021 Marvel Comics event

- Publisher: Marvel Comics
- Publication date: March 18 2020
- Main character(s): Champions; Power Pack; C.R.A.D.L.E. Roxxon Energy Corporation

Creative team
- Writer: See here
- Artist: See here
- Colorist: See here

"Outlawed" is a comic book storyline published by Marvel Comics starting with the one-shot issue Outlawed on March 18, 2020. This new event for Marvel's young heroes is set after the events of the one-shot issue Incoming!

Because of the COVID-19 pandemic, the physical comics for this storyline were not published. Instead, the tie-in issues were released digitally starting on May 13, 2020, while the main storyline was released starting on October 7, 2020.

The final conclusion of this storyline ends in its follow-up, titled "Killer App".

== Plot ==
=== Beginning: Incoming! ===
Brawn is visiting his Champions teammates at Champions Mobile Bunker for movie night. They hear a news report on Senator Geoffrey Patrick denouncing Brawn for his rampage in New York, and his allegations that Brawn is not the first young hero to endanger the public. Meanwhile, Spider-Man (Miles Morales) and Spider-Man (Peter Parker) stop a truck that has crashed through the Brooklyn Bridge. Peter and Miles discuss Senator Patrick's recent crusade against young heroes. Peter observes that Patrick's comments about being a menace are similar to his past interactions with J. Jonah Jameson.

The Champions are monitoring a teen summit at Coles Academic High School to protect Ailana Kabua, who has been targeted by the Roxxon Energy Corporation. The school is attacked by Roxxon using an Asgardian dragon left from the War of the Realms. Power Man sends his chi-force at the dragon but Viv is accidentally hit and becomes unstable. The Champions are unable to keep the high school from being destroyed as they stop both the dragon and Viv, who disappears. Ms. Marvel is injured while escorting Ailana to safety. Due to the Coles Disaster, Senator Patrick sponsors the Underage Superhuman Welfare Act, which outlaws superheroes under the age of 21. To honor the injured Kamala, the act is named "Kamala's Law". The passage of the USWA leads to the creation of a task force called C.R.A.D.L.E. (Child-Hero Reconnaissance And Disruption Law Enforcement). C.R.A.D.L.E. attacks superheroes Moon Girl and Ironheart, resulting in a wave of protests. C.R.A.D.L.E. commandeers the Champions Mobile Bunker, arrests Snowguard and Locust, and hang wanted posters of Ms. Marvel in Jersey City.

=== Main plot ===
After waking from a coma, Ms. Marvel makes an unexpected announcement that the Champions will not give up without a fight. Miles Morales escapes from a sting by the NYPD who are in a turf war with C.R.A.D.L.E. Miles reaches the abandoned warehouse where the Champions, Cloud 9, Energizer, Mass Master, Moon Girl, Squirrel Girl and Vulture's granddaughter Starling have gathered to plan their next move in a video conference with Ms. Marvel. The young heroes are split over how to proceed under the new law. As they argue, C.R.A.D.L.E. raids the hideout. Ms. Marvel ends the conference call, realizing there is a spy among them. Bombshell and Wasp are arrested while the rest are teleported to safety by Pinpoint. Unbeknownst to others, Viv is the spy who had sent encrypted message to C.R.A.D.L.E.

Bombshell, Locust, Snowguard, and Starling are taken into a Re-education Center for brainwashing by C.R.A.D.L.E. Protests erupt across Chicago where the Champions members Ms. Marvel, Nova (Sam Alexander), and Spider-Man monitor the crowd. They call Ironheart and receive no response. When C.R.A.D.L.E. and the police start arresting protesters, the Champions rescue them. Later, they confront Ironheart in her public identity at her house, as Ms. Marvel suspects her to be a spy. Riri is furious with Ms. Marvel, holding her responsible for Viv's presumed death, but transforms into Ironheart when they are attacked by C.R.A.D.L.E. Elsewhere, Viv is on run and prays for the Champions to stop fighting C.R.A.D.L.E. and be safe.

At the Re-education Center, a brainwashed Bombshell gives an interview admitting guilt for Coles Disaster, leading to a skirmish between C.R.A.D.L.E. and the Champions. Bombshell's interview becomes breaking news. Somewhere in Kansas, Viv helps an old woman who gives her a place to stay. Meanwhile, Ironheart, Ms. Marvel, Nova, and Spider-Man are on run from C.R.A.D.L.E. They try but fail to get help from the Avengers and Brawn. They are saved by Dust, Pixie and Cyclops, who rescue them during an ambush by C.R.A.D.L.E. Cyclops offers them asylum on Krakoa and tells the C.R.A.D.L.E. agents to stop unless they want war with the mutant nation.

Pixie teleports the remaining Champions, Cyclops, and Dust to Ironheart's now abandoned lab instead of Krakoa, where Cyclops, Dust, and Pixie reveal that not only is Viv Vision alive, but also betrayed them to C.R.A.D.L.E. out of guilt for Kamala's Law. The X-Men explain to their former teammates they lied to C.R.A.D.L.E. about the latter team's current whereabouts, due to Krakoa being a mutant-only zone. Cyclops provides the Champions a temporary safe haven outside America on the pirate ship Marauder, provided by Captain Red Queen, Storm, Bishop, Pyro and Iceman. After getting honorary status Cyclops returns to Krakoa while the Champions help the X-Men's Marauder crew to fight against Attuma's army and rescue the civilians on an invaded ship. Meanwhile, Viv watches her former teammates fight crime through satellite projection. The old woman reveals her past life to Viv, and that she knew her secret identity as a Champion all along, encouraging her to repeal the current unjust law and ask to her old team for forgiveness.

Viv contacts Brawn and locates where C.R.A.D.L.E. is holding the captive young heroes. The young heroes discover that Roxxon had orchestrated the event, secretly manipulating Senator Patrick and shifting the blame on the Champions. The Champions reunite at Riri's home in Chicago, seeking help from Riri's family to repeal the act. Before broadcasting the truth about Roxxon's illegal activities, Viv confesses her motives to her teammates were meant for their safety. Senator Patrick, who now knows about Roxxon's activities, is surrounded by its agents to be killed until the Champions and a group of protesters rescue him. As Roxxon backs down, the Champions announce to the public that Senator Patrick has agreed to end his partnership with Roxxon, demolish the C.R.A.D.L.E.'s “Re-education” Center. Some time later, Miles and Sam become interns at Roxxon.

=== Conclusion: Killer App ===
While the Champions are now free to return to their crime-fighting careers, Kamala's Law is still in force, and Roxxon is attempting to launch an app called "Roxx-On" to cover their dubious activities, under the direction of Miriam Blakemoore. Meanwhile, Champion member Snowguard leads a group of protestors on Roxxon. Much to Riri's dismay, Roxxon hires her rival, André Sims. Ms. Marvel learns that Roxxon uses their app to secretly gather data to ensure Kamala's Law is fully enforced. It is revealed that André is creating Roxxon's Sentinel-like robots the Champerones to capture under-aged lawbreakers. The Champions send Miles and Sam undercover as interns, and are later joined by Ms. Marvel. During a rally speech by Snowguard, Bombshell, and Falcon to their fellow protestors, the Champions save them from an ambush by undercover Roxxon and C.R.A.D.L.E. agents.

During Kamala's undercover mission with Miles and Sam, Viv infiltrates Roxxon's secret lab where Champerones are created and sends the data of Roxxon's next plots to Riri. During the Roxx-On festival, the Champions secretly apprehend Fizzle group to ensure Kamala's speech exposing Roxxon's true motive is a success. Kamala's Law is repealed and C.R.A.D.L.E. is disbanded. While all of the younger superheroes celebrate their victory at the Champions' bunker, André secretly unleashes his Champerones to hunt young heroes who broke the now-repealed law. While the Champions evacuate all young civilians from rampaging Champerones, Miriam stops André from damaging the company's reputation further and arrests him. Miriam shuts down the Champerones, but the right side of André's head becomes mechanical, allowing him to control the Champerones directly.

== Issues involved ==
=== Prelude one-shot ===
Title	Writer	Artist	Colorist	Debut date
Incoming!	Various			December 26, 2019

=== Main plot ===
Title	Issues	Writer	Artist	Colorist	Debut date	Conclusion date
Outlawed	1	Eve L. Ewing	Kim Jacinto	Espen Grundetjern	March 18, 2020	
Champions	1–5	Eve L. Ewing	Simone Di Meo	Federico Blee	October 7, 2020	March 17, 2021

=== Tie-in issues ===
Title	Issues	Writer	Artist	Colorist	Debut date	Conclusion date
Miles Morales: Spider-Man	17–19	Saladin Ahmed	Carmen Carnero	David Guriel	June 10, 2020	October 7, 2020
Magnificent Ms. Marvel	14–17	Saladin Ahmed	Minkyu Jung	Ian Herring	September 9, 2020	December 16, 2020
Power Pack	1–5	Ryan North	Nico Leon	Rachelle Rosenberg	November 25, 2020	April 14, 2021
New Warriors^{[a]}	1–5	Daniel Kibblesmith	Luciano Vecchio	N/A	Cancelled	

- ^{^[a]}On April 15, 2020 Marvel Comics announced that a new version of the New Warriors would appear in the Outlawed storyline, under the mentorship of the original team. The new characters, Trailblazer, Screentime, Snowflake, Safespace and B-Negative, met considerable backlash from the online audience, particularly due to the use of internet slang in their names as well as the perceived political agenda of the writing and designs, with Snowflake and Safespace drawing most of the criticism. Originally delayed by the COVID-19 pandemic as of January 2021, it has not been rescheduled for release.

== Critical reception ==
The story overall received mixed reviews. On Comic Book Round Up, the story received a score of 7.3 out of 10 based on 18 reviews.

In a review of Outlawed #1, Matt Morrison from Kabooom wrote "Fans of Champions may enjoy this series, but it is hard to recommend it to anyone else. Familiarity with the characters is assumed, so new readers will be left in the dark. The story, while competently executed, is far too derivative of earlier series. And the artwork is merely okay, apart from a few oddly awful panels. Despite this, it's better than Civil War, but that's damning with faint praise." Hannibal Tabu, in his review of the issue for Bleeding Cool, commented that "On a good side, the ability of Eve Ewing to make a compelling script remains untouched. [...] The artwork from Jacknto, Grundetjern and Cowles likewise takes make dynamic choices in presenting this tragedy. Here's the thing … there is a long history of legislative efforts to rein in metahumans [...]. Taking a tragedy this close to the actual failings in our world while many of us are cloistered behind locked doors, others are forced into potentially virally lethal streets and others laugh in the face of it … it's not exactly entertainment, and maybe not what we need right now".

Kevin Erdmann, for Screen Rant, stated that unlike the first Civil War event, "the Champions end up creating a very satisfying ending". Erdmann highlighted that "not only does Viv Vision confess to her teammates and take responsibility for her actions in Outlawed's inciting incident, but the Champions also discover that the corrupt company Roxxon is under contract with the U.S government, and that they are the ones responsible for the cruel 'reeducation camps' the public has had no idea about. [...] However, the story doesn't end by simply making Roxxon the villains. The Champions equally recognize that they need to hold themselves more accountable for their actions, and need to be better in the future for their own safety as well as for others". Erdmann commented that the resolution is "much more satisfying" than Civil War's because the various characters accept responsibility and are able to come to a compromise with Senator Patrick.

== Collected editions ==
Title	Material collected	Published date	ISBN
Ms. Marvel by Saladin Ahmed Vol. 3: Outlawed	Magnificent Ms. Marvel #13–18	March 2021	978-1302925000
Champions Vol. 1: Outlawed	Outlawed #1, Champions (vol. 4) #1–5	June 2021	978-1302922900
Power Pack: Powers That Be	Power Pack (vol. 4) #1–5	June 2021	978-1302924362
Miles Morales: Spider-Man Vol. 4: Ultimatum	Miles Morales: Spider-Man #16–21	February 2021	978-1302920173
