= Empyre =

2020 Marvel Comics event

- Cover to Empyre #1 (art by Valerio Schiti)
- Publisher: Marvel Comics
- Publication date: July 2020
- Genre: Superhero; Crossover
- Main character(s): Avengers; Fantastic Four; Hulkling; Kree; Skrull; Wiccan; X-Men

Creative team
- Writer(s): Al Ewing; Dan Slott

"Empyre" is a comic book story arc published in July 2020 by Marvel Comics. This storyline follows the events of Incoming! with the genre of superhero crossover.

== Premise ==
The Avengers, the Fantastic Four and various other heroes of the Marvel universe come together to fight and prevent the incoming invasion of the Kree/Skrull armada being led by Hulkling, who has been crowned as "Dorrek VIII".

== Editorial history ==
The first comic of the story arc, Road to Empyre: The Kree–Skrull War, was announced in December 2019. The comic Road to Empyre was set for release in March 2020, but it incorporated references to previous Marvel narratives, Kree–Skrull War and The Celestial Madonna from the 1970s, and the 2019 comic Meet the Skrulls. It had previously been set up in the Incoming! comic as well.

== Plot ==
=== Lead-up ===
Teddy Altman (Hulkling) is asked to become the ruler of the Kree-Skrull alliance at the cost of leaving his longtime lover Billy Kaplan (Wiccan). He adopts the mantle Dorrek VIII and begins preparing to invade Earth for "the final war".

G'iah and her daughters locate a sample from the Cotati in a lab. G'iah tells her children how the Skrulls were peaceful during Emperor Dorrek I's rule. The Kree massacred the Cotati and the Skrulls after losing to the Cotati in a contest engineered by the Skrulls, starting the Kree–Skrull War. G'iah is attacked by a Kree, who suddenly receives a message from Dorrek VIII stating to all Kree and Skrull soldiers that the two species have united to face a common enemy.

Tony Stark begins having vivid nightmares thanks to a vision given to him by Immortus (Note: As seen in Avengers #133.) about the massacre of the Cotati by the Kree. Shortly after waking up, he receives a call from Captain Marvel about a psychic request sent from the Blue Area of the Moon. After arriving on the Moon, the Avengers learn that the Cotati have secretly lived there for some time. The Avengers later learn that the Kree and Skrulls have been united in their hatred towards the Cotati. Thanks to a rousing speech from Iron Man, the team all agreed to defend the Cotati.

At Casino Cosmico, a dimension dedicated entirely to gambling and gladiator fights, the Elder of the Universe known as the Profiteer reveals herself as the new owner of the place after having acquired it from her brother the Grandmaster. She re-enacted the Kree–Skrull War, pitting a Kree child named Jo-Venn against a Skrull child named N'Kalla for the pleasure of her patrons. Franklin Richards and Valeria Richards manage to break the bank and became the new owners of Casino Cosmico, but give ownership back to the Profiteer in exchange for Jo-Venn and N'Kalla's freedom.

=== Main plot ===
As the joint fleet of the Kree and the Skrulls approaches Earth, the Avengers prepare to defend the Cotati while the Fantastic Four send Franklin, Valeria, Jo-Venn and N'Kalla back to Earth while they make contact with Hulkling to establish the situation. The initial conflict is brief with Hulkling and his inner circle Super-Skrull, Captain Glory, and Tanalth the Pursuer, but it is soon established that the Cotati intend to establish themselves as a new empire.

In Wakanda, Black Panther deduces that the Cotati seek Vibranium to grow the same Death Blossom that was used on the Kree/Skrull fleets. The pilot of the ship arrives and is revealed to be Mantis, who plans to reason with Quoi. On the Alliance ship, Captain Marvel, Human Torch, Hulkling, and the Alliance's inner circle discuss their plans to weaken the Cotati. As the Alliance disagrees with Hulkling, Tanalth has Super-Skrull bring up a previous incident where he destroyed several Skrull colonies that imitated Earth culture. Captain Glory speaks with Tanalth in private about how Ronan died standing with the Utopian faction (Note: As seen in Death of the Inhumans.) and that his gene scan does not identify her as a Kree. Tanalth is revealed to be the thought-dead Skrull empress R'Kill in disguise.

At Avengers Mountain, Tony Stark is working on another Iron Man armor as Mister Fantastic informs him about the Pyre, a weapon which they plan to use on the Sun. In Wakanda, Black Panther is leading his allies and army in fighting the Cotati. At Lake Victoria, Quoi and the Swordsman Cotati hear that the battle is not over as She-Hulk, Invisible Woman, and the Thing arrive with Mantis to confront them. She-Hulk is revealed to have been possessed by the Cotati, while Wiccan suspects that Hulkling has been possessed as well. Mister Fantastic informs Tony Stark that there is a Death Blossom in Wakanda and with the Pyre triggered, they have nine minutes to save the world.

Hulkling tells Captain Marvel, Human Torch, and Wiccan to combine their abilities in order to prevent the Pyre. At Lake Victoria, Invisible Woman, Mantis, and Thing are locked in combat with the Cotati-possessed She-Hulk, but Jo-Venn and N'Kalla manage to free her. On the Kree-Skrull alliance's warship, Captain Glory exposes that the imposter Hulkling is R'Kill and states that he is done being part of her plan. Mur-G'nn is ordered by Hulking to take Captain Glory and the Super-Skrull to Wiccan in order to help him out while he deals with R'Kill. As the Swordsman Cotati informs Quoi that the Dark Harvest has failed, Black Panther recovers and engages the Swordsman Cotati while Mister Fantastic arrives to confront Qui. The Swordsman Cotati tries to use Quoi as a shield, only for Black Panther to destroy him and the Death Blossom. The other Cotati agree to surrender.

=== Aftermath ===
Hulkling and Wiccan get married, making Wiccan the Prince-Consort and Court Wizard to the Kree-Skrull alliance. Abigail Brand tells Captain Marvel that the Alpha Flight space program did not detect the Cotati operating in the Blue Area of the Moon and that Alpha Flight cannot function as a team if they are "caught in the loop". As Hulkling tries to break up the discussion, Brand announces her resignation from Alpha Flight.

Franklin Richards brings the Cotati to an uninhabited planet where they will be safe. The Profiteer attempts to gain custody of Jo-Venn and N'Kalla, but Hulkling refuses to do so and places the two in the care of Thing and Alicia. After everyone takes their leave, Nick Fury observes the Cotati weapons. He is suddenly overcome with energy as Uatu is brought back to life.

At the Outer Rim, a Kree-Skrull armada encounters Talos the Untamed inside an escape pod. Two days later, Talos awakens and reveals that he was sent by Hulkling to investigate the Kree and Skrull bases that went dark, but was ambushed by Knull and his Symbiote dragons. In the present, Talos is confronted by Knull a second time.

== Issues involved ==
=== Prelude ===
- Incoming! (December 2019)
- Road to Empyre: The Kree/Skrull War #1 (March 2020)
- Empyre: Avengers #0 (June 2020)
- Empyre: Fantastic Four #0 (July 2020)

=== Main ===
- Empyre #1–6 (July–September 2020)

=== Solicited tie-ins ===
- Captain Marvel (vol. 10) #18–21 (July–September 2020)
- Empyre Handbook #1 (July 2020)
- Empyre: Avengers #1–3 (July–August 2020)
- Empyre: Captain America #1–3 (July–August 2020)
- Empyre: The Immortal She-Hulk #1 (September 2020)
- Empyre: Savage Avengers #1 (July 2020)
- Empyre: X-Men #1–4 (July–August 2020)
- Fantastic Four (vol. 6) #21–23 (July–September 2020)
- Lords of Empyre: Celestial Messiah #1 (August 2020)
- Lords of Empyre: Emperor Hulkling #1 (July 2020)
- Lords of Empyre: Swordsman #1 (August 2020)
- X-Men (vol. 5) #10–11 (July–August 2020)

=== Aftermath issues ===
- Empyre: Aftermath Avengers #1 (September 2020)
- Empyre Fallout: Fantastic Four #1 (September 2020)
- Web of Venom: Empyre's End #1 (October 2020)
- Guardians of the Galaxy (vol. 6) #7-8 (October–November 2020)

=== Cancelled tie-ins ===
A number of titles were removed from the storyline checklist due to the COVID-19 pandemic:

- Empyre: Ghost Rider #1
- Empyre: The Invasion of Wakanda #1–3
- Empyre: Spider-Man #1–3
- Empyre: Squadron Supreme #1–2
- Empyre: Stormranger #1–3
- Empyre: Thor #1–3
- Strikeforce #10
- The Union #1–3 (of 5) (this title was resolicited as a tie-in to the King in Black crossover event)

== Reception ==
According to the aggregate website ComicBookRoundup, the typical issue of the core series received an average score of 7.2/10.

The series won in the Outstanding Comic Book category at the 32nd GLAAD Media Awards.

== Collected editions ==
Title	Material Collected	Publication date	ISBN
Road to Empyre	Incoming! #1, Road to Empyre: The Kree/Skrull War #1, Empyre Handbook #1	September 2020	978-1302925888
Empyre	Empyre: Avengers #0, Empyre: Fantastic Four #0, Empyre #1-6, Empyre Aftermath: Avengers #1, Empyre Fallout: Fantastic Four #1	October 2020	978-1302924386
Empyre: X-Men	Empyre: X-Men #1-4	October 2020	978-1302925758
Lords of Empyre	Lords of Empyre: Emperor Hulkling #1, Lords of Empyre: Celestial Messiah #1, Lords of Empyre: Swordsman #1, Empyre: Savage Avengers #1	November 2020	978-1302925918
Empyre: Captain America & The Avengers	Empyre: Captain America #1-3, Empyre: Avengers #1-3	November 2020	978-1302925901
Fantastic Four by Dan Slott Vol. 6: Empyre	Fantastic Four #20-24	December 2020	978-1302920470
Empyre Omnibus	Incoming! #1, Road to Empyre: The Kree/Skrull War #1, Empyre Handbook #1, Empyre: Avengers #0, Empyre: Fantastic Four #0, Empyre #1-6, Empyre Aftermath: Avengers #1, Empyre Fallout: Fantastic Four #1, Empyre: X-Men #1-4, Lords of Empyre: Emperor Hulkling #1, Lords of Empyre: Celestial Messiah #1, Lords of Empyre: Swordsman #1, Empyre: Savage Avengers #1, Empyre: Captain America #1-3, Empyre: Avengers #1-3, X-Men #10-11; Fantastic Four #21-23; Captain Marvel #18-21; The Immortal She-Hulk #1; Web of Venom: Empyre's End; Black Panther and the Agents of Wakanda #7-8	November 2021	978-1302928254

== Other versions ==
In the Midnight Universe, empyres are mutant-vampire hybrids. Empyre factions, one of which is led by Storm, control New York City boroughs.
