= Strikeforce (comics) =

Team of superheroes

- Variant cover to Strikeforce #1 by Mike Deodato, featuring the characters Angela, Blade, Daimon Hellstrom, Spectrum, Spider-Woman, Wiccan and Winter Soldier.

Group publication information
- Publisher: Marvel Comics
- First appearance: Strikeforce #1 (September 2019)
- Created by: Tini Howard; Germán Peralta

In-story information
- Member(s): Angela; Blade; Daimon Hellstrom; Spectrum; Spider-Woman; Wiccan; Winter Soldier

Strikeforce

Series publication information
- Format: Ongoing series
- Publication date: September 2019–August 2020
- Number of issues: 9
- Creator(s): Tini Howard; Germán Peralta

Strikeforce are a team of superheroes appearing in American comic books published by Marvel Comics. The team first appears in Strikeforce #1 (September 2019) and was created by writer Tini Howard and artist Germán Peralta. Critics have described the series as Marvel's answer to Justice League Dark.

== Publication history ==
Marvel Comics announced the series in June 2019: "Doing the dirty jobs the Avengers and other Marvel heroes can't do! Angela, Blade, Spider-Woman, Wiccan, the Winter Soldier, Monica Rambeau, and Daimon Hellstrom join forces for a monsterrific bloodbath from the dark mind of rising star Tini Howard. Prepare for a tale from the underside of the Marvel Universe in STRIKEFORCE!"

The series was cancelled in July 2020, making issue #9 (released August 5, 2020) the series finale.

== Plot summary ==
The Avengers are called to a secret medical facility after receiving reports that someone is trying to release dangerous biological weapons into the atmosphere to infect the population. She-Hulk is driven mad when she comes in contact with the air inside the facility and destroys a wall in a fit of rage, finding Angela, Spectrum, Spider-Woman, Wiccan and Winter Soldier hiding there with no memory of how they came to be there. The Avengers take them into custody and Black Panther calls in Blade to try and make sense of what has happened since neither he or Iron Man can detect any sort of mind control or Skrull energy signatures that would explain what has happened to them. Blade helps the group escape from custody and tells them that, when he was hunting vampires recently, he came across a shapeshifter who had taken the appearance of a young girl but had kept the girl alive and imprisoned and suggests that a similar thing has happened to them. Angela quickly confirms that the shapeshifters are Asgardian in nature and must have landed on Earth after Freyja destroyed their home. Wiccan is reluctant to participate in a mission without the Avengers' knowledge and Spider-Woman in eager to get home to her son but Angela informs them that these shapeshifters become more powerful when more people know of their existence, meaning they must act alone. The team are attacked by a shapeshifter posing as Doctor Doom, with Wiccan theorising that they must have captured Doom and are keeping him somewhere Blade tracks some of the shapeshifters to one of their bases and but the team are quickly overwhelmed. When Daimon Hellstrom attacks, Blade kills him, believing him to be a shapeshifter but, when Satana calls moments later and tells him her brother has just arrived in Las Vegas and is acting strangely, Blade realises he has accidentally killed the real Hellstrom.

The team arrive at Satana's club in Vegas and she takes them to her "brother" who she has kept in magical stasis since his arrival. The team force Satana to leave so that she does not find out about the shapeshifters and task Wiccan with destroying the fake Daimon. Wiccan summons the corpse of the real Daimon but warns the team that his powers do not extend to resurrection. Blade, Spider-Woman, Spectrum and Winter Soldier search the club for other shapeshifters while Angela stays guard over Wiccan in case anything goes wrong. Satana returns and seduces Angela just as Wiccan destroys the fake Hellstrom. The rest of the team find Satana trapped on a stairwell and return to her office, killing the shapeshifter that had been posing as her. A group of smaller shapeshifters attack the team and, in retribution for them taking Daimon, they capture Wiccan.

Angela, and Daimon, who was resurrected by his sister, arrive at Wiccan's house and tie up Hulkling, telling him it is too risky for him to know what is going on as Blade fights the shapeshifter posing as Wiccan. Once he is dead, Hulking announces that he is joining the team so that he can rescue his fiancé however, Blade puts him to sleep to stop him following them. Meanwhile, the shapeshifters bring Doom into the cell with Wiccan in the hopes that they can use his magic to gain Doom's knowledge. Wiccan is initially nervous due to Doom's history with his mother, but quickly determines that the shapeshifters have captured a Doombot and have no idea that it is not the real Doctor Doom. Wiccan animates the Doombot and uses it to escape from his captors just as the rest of the team arrives to rescue him. Angela duels against one of the shapeshifters but she escapes. Spectrum uses her powers to locate a hidden prisoner, the Count, and the team rescue him before Daimon and the Winter Soldier destroy the prison.

The team seek refuge in one of Doom's safehouses while they wait for the Count to wake up. Winter Soldier reveals that during the War, he was captured by a creature that took his shape and tried to kill Captain America although he was able to stop it before it could. He believes that this shapeshifter is the same one that Blade fought during his vampire hunt. Daimon similarly recounts a story about how he was fighting some cultists alongside his ex-girlfriend Hellcat and that, despite rekindling their relationship that night, he received a phone call from her the next day chastising him for bringing girls back to the Defender's safehouse, theorising that the Hellcat he fought alongside was a shapeshifter. Spider-Woman storms off, unable to cope after her own history with shapeshifters. Angela goes after her and Spider-Woman tells her that she almost killed her own son after believing he had been replaced by a shapeshifter, admitting that she feels guilty. Angela announces to the group that all of their stories about past experiences with the shapeshifters are lies that have been implanted, arguing that these shapeshifters had never left Asgard until recently. They are interrupted when Ghost attacks Spectrum, knocking her unconscious. The team go after him while Wiccan and Daimon stay with Spectrum and the Count. Wiccan reveals that he knows Daimon is purposefully preventing the Count from waking up and confronts him about why he was working with the shapeshifters in the first place. Daimon explains that they approached him seeking his help with a magic ritual that would help them find a home after landing on Earth. Spectrum, Angela, Blade, Winter Soldier and Spier-Woman track Ghost to a small hospital where they discover he has been working with Moonstone to try to bring people back from the dead. They discover that Spectrum can use her powers to guide the souls back into their bodies shortly after death and they manipulate her into reviving them. Angela and Ghost make a deal and they work together to defeat Moonstone while Spectrum releases the souls so that they can die peacefully.

When the Count wakes up, he tells Strikeforce that he wants revenge on the shapeshifter who held him captive though Angela notes that she has not been seen since their duel. They go to Deadpool, who reveals that she has been freaking out the patrons at a local bar. Spider-Woman, desperate to finish the mission so she can go back to her son, heads to the bar alone but is tracked by Blade and Winter Soldier. They find the shapeshifter and Blade agrees to let her take the Count on the assurance that they leave Earth. Returning to the safehouse, Angela is horrified that Blade has made a deal and teams with Daimon and Wiccan to prevent the shapeshifter from taking him, eventually resulting in the team pursuing them to Svartalfheim, which is caught in an eternal war. As they search for the Count, the team comes into conflict with dark elves loyal to Malekith the Accursed, Hela, and Karnilla and Angela's mother Freyja though they eventually rescue him and teleport back to Earth. Spider-Woman makes a deal with a local boxing manager which allows the Count to remain under Deadpool's protection, meaning his species has a new chance at survival. With their mission complete, Strikeforce confess everything to the Avengers, with Captain Marvel suggesting that they remain together to tackle threats the Avengers are unable to handle though everyone declines. Angela travels with Blade to continue her adventures and the rest of the team return home to their normal lives, though they all promise to be ready if a new threat rises.

== Team roster ==
List of Strikeforce team members, showing real names and issue where they joined the team
Character	Real name	Joined in
Angela	Aldrif Odinsdottir	Strikeforce #1 (September 2019)
Blade	Eric Brooks	Strikeforce #1 (September 2019)
Spectrum	Monica Rambeau	Strikeforce #1 (September 2019)
Spider-Woman	Jessica Drew	Strikeforce #1 (September 2019)
Wiccan	William "Billy" Kaplan	Strikeforce #1 (September 2019)
Winter Soldier	James Buchanan "Bucky" Barnes	Strikeforce #1 (September 2019)
Daimon Hellstrom		Strikeforce #3 (November 2019)

== Collected editions ==
Title	Material Collected	Format	Publication date	ISBN
Strikeforce – Volume 1 – Trust Me	Strikeforce #1–5	Trade paperback	February 25, 2020	ISBN 978-1302920098
Strikeforce – Volume 2 – Fight Me	Strikeforce #6–9	Trade paperback	December 8, 2020	ISBN 978-1302920104
